= Leader of the Liberal Party of Canada =

Leader of the Liberal Party
- Chef du Parti libéral
- Incumbent; Mark Carney since March 9, 2025
- Status: Party leader
- Member of: Liberal Party of Canada
- Appointer: Elected by members of the party
- Inaugural holder: George Brown
- Formation: March 6, 1873
- Deputy: Deputy Leader

The leader of the Liberal Party of Canada (French: chef du Parti libéral du Canada) is the highest political office of the Liberal Party of Canada. The holder of the office is the formal political head of the party as a political organization and its parliamentary caucus in Canada's House of Commons, with specific authority to "speak for the party concerning any political issue".

The current leader is Mark Carney, the current prime minister of Canada. He is the 14th permanent leader. He succeeded former Prime Minister Justin Trudeau as party leader on March 9, 2025, following his victory in the party's leadership election, and succeeded Trudeau as prime minister five days later. Given that the Liberal Party has been one of the two principal contenders for power for most of Canada's history, most of the past holders of this office had served as prime minister.

The leader primarily functions in parliament and, when the party is in power, in government. Past leaders had from time to time designated deputy leaders in parliamentary caucus, or deputy prime ministers in their ministries, and assigned varying additional authorities and responsibilities to such deputies. There is currently no such deputy designated. The leader is also advised and assisted by two individuals holding offices through separate elections: the national caucus chair elected by the party's parliamentary caucus (currently Etobicoke—Lakeshore MP James Maloney); and party president, a volunteer elected by the party's convention to serve as the board chair and executive head of the party's administrative organization (currently Sachit Mehra).

== Likelihood for premiership ==
With the Liberal Party having been one of the two principal contenders for power for most of Canada's history, majority of the office holders has served as prime minister of Canada, including all seven permanent leaders in the 20th century.

11 of the party's 14 permanent leaders were among Canada's 24 prime ministers. Among them, five became prime ministers elect upon their selection as party leader, and six became prime ministers upon the party winning a subsequent general election.

=== Extended premiership ===
While they number fewer than their conservative rivals, the 11 Liberal prime ministers collectively governed the nation for longer. Excluding the current leader, the ten former Liberal prime ministers led the nation's government for 92.5 of Canada's 157 years history (or 59%). Among them were William Lyon Mackenzie King, Canada's longest serving prime minister (three stints totaling 21.5 years) and Wilfrid Laurier, the Canadian prime minister with the longest uninterrupted tenure at 15.2 years.

Compared to their principal rivals, the former permanent leaders of the Conservative Party of Canada (and the leaders of its predecessor Progressive Conservative Party and the pre-1942 Conservative Party) fewer Liberal leaders left office without having led the party to victory at least once. Of the 14 permanent leaders, only four left office without having won an electoral mandate. In comparison, 10 the 21 former permanent Conservative leaders left office without having won an electoral mandate, and four of the 21 without ever leading their party through a general election.

=== Extended leadership ===
The high proportion of past leaders having served as prime minister can be partially explained by their relative longevity. The tenure of the 13 permanent leaders averaged 11.5 years, comparing to 7.1 years for their 21 Conservative peers. Laurier's 31.7 years and King's 29 years tenure were the longest and second longest leadership among all parliamentary parties in Canada, and the only federal leaderships that lasted more than a quarter century.

Such lengthy leadership can be attributed to the Liberal Party's willingness to lets its rookie leader remain in office after electoral defeats, thus creating possibility of comeback victories. Among the 13 former Liberal leader, 11 experienced electoral defeats at least once. Six remained in office to fight another election, with three of the six having won or regained the premiership in a later election. Of the five who resigned their leadership after one election defeat, three did so having previously led the party to previous victory. Only two former leaders, Stephane Dion and Michael Ignatieff left office after only one unsuccessful attempt at the premiership, compared to six former Conservative leaders having left office after only one unsuccessful attempt.

== History and election ==
=== Selection by caucus ===
During the first and second parliamentary elections (or Dominion elections as they were known then) campaigns after Canadian Confederation, the Liberals were a loose grouping of reformers opposing the Liberal-conservative government of John A. Macdonald but without a formal leader. George Brown, a key Father of Confederation who was then leader of the Clear Grits in Ontario, was recognized as the informal leader in the first parliamentary election. Having led the Ontario Liberals to victory in early 1871 and served as the province's premier for about ten months, Blake's informal leadership during the second parliamentary election was more firmly established than Brown's. However, after failing to dislodge Macdonald in the polls in the 1872 election, Blake hesitated from taking on the role of leader.

With Blake unwilling to assume the role of permanent leader, reformers in parliament selected Alexander Mackenzie, a long-time ally of Brown who served as Treasurer in the brief Blake ministry in Ontario, as the group's first formal leader in March 1873. When the Macdonald government fell due to the Pacific Scandal in 1873, Mackenzie was called upon by Governor General Lord Dufferin to form a new ministry. He became Canada's first Liberal prime minister in November 1873, and let the Liberal Party to its first electoral victory in January 1874. The Liberal caucus also selected Blake as the next leader Blake in 1880, having pushed Mackenzie out of the way following party defeat in the 1878 election.

In 1887 upon Blake's resignation due to ill health, the Liberal caucus selected Wilfrid Laurier, a protégée of both Mackenzie and Blake, as its third leader, mostly out of deference to Blake's wishes, to the surprise of many including Laurier himself. Laurier accepted the leadership assuming it was a temporary assignment while Blake recover his health. It was not until June 1893, six years into his leadership, that Laurier would convene a national convention of the Liberal Party of the Dominion of Canada and have the 1,800 assembled delegates formally ratify his leadership.

=== Leadership convention ===
The Liberal Party held nine leadership conventions between 1919 and 2009. The evolution of applicable rules reflects the evolving expectation of the members and the public for internal democracy, representation, and also the party's evolving emphasis of representation of certain groups in its decision making structure.

Equal weighting by electoral district – One notable constant feature for all nine convention was the equal representational weighting of all electoral districts. While the presence of ex-officio delegates and other delegate categories distorted the exact representation for each district slightly, equal weighting of all electoral districts remained the paramount requirement for delegate composition through all nine conventions, and remain the paramount feature for leadership elections to this day.

Balloting at conventions – The Liberal Party held its first leadership convention on August 7, 1919, the first national leadership convention in Canada for any party with parliamentary representation. (Note: It was however not the first leadership convention in Canada or for the party, as the party's Ontario association elected provincial party leader Hartley Dewart in June earlier that year.) Balloting continued until one candidate won a majority of votes, with no requirement for candidates to be eliminated. With only four candidate, the convention took five ballots to elect King over former finance minister William Stevens Fielding. Rules were added at the next convention in 1948 to eliminate the candidate with the fewest votes on a given ballot starting on the fifth ballot. It was unnecessary for that convention as Louis St. Laurent won the leadership on first ballot with close to 70% of the votes. In more recent convention, the elimination starts from first ballot, and candidates with less than 5% of the vote on the first ballot would also be eliminated. Since 1919, time has also been given between ballots for candidates to announce if they wish to withdraw and throw their support to another candidate.

Guarantee representation for women, disproportionate clout for youth – A fixed allocations of delegate positions were reserved for youth and women at conventions of the Liberal Party of Canada starting in 1948. At the 1948 convention that elected Louis St. Laurent, 82 delegate accreditations (out of approximately 1300) were designated for the Young Liberal Federation, accounting for 6.3% of the convention delegates. While only 28 delegate positions were designated for the Women Liberal Federation, women made up a substantial proportion of the regulate delegates. Starting at the 1990 convention, half of the electoral districts delegate accreditations were to be reserved for women, pushing the share of women delegates up to 46% at that convention. The proportion of delegate accreditation guaranteed to youth would reach its peak at the 2003 convention, with 1200 constituency youth delegates and over 500 campus club delegates making up close 40% of the convention. The party further added approximately 600 delegate accreditations for indigenous delegates at the 2006 convention, though a substantial portion of that went unfilled.

Final leadership conventions - Unbeknownst to delegates in attendance at the time, the 2006 leadership convention held in Montreal was the last competitive leadership convention held by any major political party (Note: as in political parties with current representation in the House of Commons) at the national level. It was also the only instance in the federal Liberal Party's history the first-place contestant at the first ballot did not end up winning the contest. The 2006 convention ended with the surprise election of fourth-place contender Stephane Dion over frontrunners Michael Ignatieff and Bob Rae. Following Dion's resignation, the Liberal Party held its last leadership convention in May 2009 in Vancouver. The actual contest however ended months earlier in December 2008 when Dominic Leblanc and Bob Rae withdrew from the race, allowing presumed leader-elect Michael Ignatieff to assume the party's parliamentary leadership.

=== Direct vote by membership ===
At the 2009 convention, the Liberal Party adopted a resolution specifying that future leadership elections would be conducted with direct election by members, effectively eliminated delegated convention as the final phase. The new leadership election mechanism retained equal weighting of all electoral district by allocating 100 "points" to each, and award them on the on the basis of the proportion of the first preference votes received by each leadership contestant. The mechanism adopted makes no provision for guaranteeing any minimum representation of youth, women or indigenous people in the electorate of future leadership contests.

The election mechanism was modified in the 2012 to allow Liberal supporters to registered to vote without becoming party members. In 2016, the Liberal Party overhauled its constitution, substituting key term party "members" with Registered Liberals, and convention "delegates" with attendees, retiring two key concepts of previous leadership contest. In the party's most recent leadership contest held in 2025, registered Liberals were the electorate.

== List of leaders ==
Leader (Born-Died) Parliamentary seat (while leader)		Term of office	Tenure	Led party in elections	Ministries in office while leader
—	Hon. George Brown (1818–1880) (ran and defeated in Ontario South, Ont.); Unofficial leader (Note: During the 1867 dominion election, Brown, who served briefly as the joint premier from Canada West prior to confederation, was recognized as the senior statesman among leaders of multiple reformers groups opposing the Liberal-Conservatives)	c.1867	(n/a)	1st (1867)	Macdonald; 1st (1867–73)
—	Hon. Edward Blake (1834–1912); MP for Bruce South, Ont. (Note: Blake was also elected in Durham West; he chose to sit for Bruce South instead, and resigned as the Member of Parliament for Durham West.); Unofficial leader (Note: Unofficial leader at the 1872 election, as leader of the Ontario Liberals)	c.1872	(n/a)	2nd (1872)	Macdonald; 1st (1867–73)
1	Hon. Alexander Mackenzie (1822–1892); MP for Lambton, Ont. 2nd Prime Minister	March 6, 1873 – April 27, 1880	7 years, 52 days	3rd (1874); 4th (1878)	Macdonald; 1st (1867–73)
1	Hon. Alexander Mackenzie (1822–1892); MP for Lambton, Ont. 2nd Prime Minister	March 6, 1873 – April 27, 1880	7 years, 52 days	3rd (1874); 4th (1878)	MacKenzie; 2nd (1873–78)
1	Hon. Alexander Mackenzie (1822–1892); MP for Lambton, Ont. 2nd Prime Minister	March 6, 1873 – April 27, 1880	7 years, 52 days	3rd (1874); 4th (1878)	Macdonald; 3rd (1878–91)
2	Hon. Edward Blake (1833–1912); MP for Durham West, Ont.	May 4, 1880 – June 2, 1887	7 years, 29 days	5th (1882); 6th (1887)	Macdonald; 3rd (1878–91)
2	Hon. Edward Blake (1833–1912); MP for Durham West, Ont.	May 4, 1880 – June 2, 1887	7 years, 29 days	5th (1882); 6th (1887)	Abbott; 4th (1891–92)
2	Hon. Edward Blake (1833–1912); MP for Durham West, Ont.	May 4, 1880 – June 2, 1887	7 years, 29 days	5th (1882); 6th (1887)	Thompson; 5th (1892–94)
2	Hon. Edward Blake (1833–1912); MP for Durham West, Ont.	May 4, 1880 – June 2, 1887	7 years, 29 days	5th (1882); 6th (1887)	Bowell; 6th (1894–96)
2	Hon. Edward Blake (1833–1912); MP for Durham West, Ont.	May 4, 1880 – June 2, 1887	7 years, 29 days	5th (1882); 6th (1887)	Tupper; 7th (1896)
3	Sir Wilfrid Laurier (1841–1919); MP for Quebec East, Que. (1877–1919); Ottawa, Ont. (1908–10) (Note: Concurrently as MP for Quebec East)Soulanges, Que. (1911–17) (Note: Also elected As MP for Wright, Quebec in 1904 but opted only to hold Quebec East); 7th Prime Minister	June 23, 1887 – February 17, 1919	31 years, 239 days	7th (1891); 8th (1896); 9th (1900); 10th (1904); 11th (1908); 12th (1911); 13th (1917)	Tupper; 7th (1896)
3	Sir Wilfrid Laurier (1841–1919); MP for Quebec East, Que. (1877–1919); Ottawa, Ont. (1908–10)Soulanges, Que. (1911–17); 7th Prime Minister	June 23, 1887 – February 17, 1919	31 years, 239 days	7th (1891); 8th (1896); 9th (1900); 10th (1904); 11th (1908); 12th (1911); 13th (1917)	Laurier; 8th (1896–1911)
3	Sir Wilfrid Laurier (1841–1919); MP for Quebec East, Que. (1877–1919); Ottawa, Ont. (1908–10)Soulanges, Que. (1911–17); 7th Prime Minister	June 23, 1887 – February 17, 1919	31 years, 239 days	7th (1891); 8th (1896); 9th (1900); 10th (1904); 11th (1908); 12th (1911); 13th (1917)	Borden; 9th (1911–17)
3	Sir Wilfrid Laurier (1841–1919); MP for Quebec East, Que. (1877–1919); Ottawa, Ont. (1908–10)Soulanges, Que. (1911–17); 7th Prime Minister	June 23, 1887 – February 17, 1919	31 years, 239 days	7th (1891); 8th (1896); 9th (1900); 10th (1904); 11th (1908); 12th (1911); 13th (1917)	Borden; 10th (1917–20)
—	Hon. Daniel Duncan McKenzie (1859–1927); MP for Cape Breton North and Victoria, N.S. Interim Leader	February 17, 1919 – August 7, 1919	5 months and 21 days (interim)		Borden; 10th (1917–20)
4	Rt. Hon. William Lyon; Mackenzie King (1874–1950); MP for Prince, P.E.I. (1919–21); York North, Ont. (1921–25); Prince Albert, Sask.(1926–45); Glengarry, Ont. (1945–49); 10th Prime Minister	August 7, 1919 – August 7, 1948	29 years, 0 days	14th (1921); 15th (1925); 16th (1926); 17th (1930); 18th (1935); 19th (1940); 20th (1945)	Borden; 10th (1917–20)
4	Rt. Hon. William Lyon; Mackenzie King (1874–1950); MP for Prince, P.E.I. (1919–21); York North, Ont. (1921–25); Prince Albert, Sask.(1926–45); Glengarry, Ont. (1945–49); 10th Prime Minister	August 7, 1919 – August 7, 1948	29 years, 0 days	14th (1921); 15th (1925); 16th (1926); 17th (1930); 18th (1935); 19th (1940); 20th (1945)	Meighen; 11th (1920–21)
4	Rt. Hon. William Lyon; Mackenzie King (1874–1950); MP for Prince, P.E.I. (1919–21); York North, Ont. (1921–25); Prince Albert, Sask.(1926–45); Glengarry, Ont. (1945–49); 10th Prime Minister	August 7, 1919 – August 7, 1948	29 years, 0 days	14th (1921); 15th (1925); 16th (1926); 17th (1930); 18th (1935); 19th (1940); 20th (1945)	King; 12th (1921–26)
4	Rt. Hon. William Lyon; Mackenzie King (1874–1950); MP for Prince, P.E.I. (1919–21); York North, Ont. (1921–25); Prince Albert, Sask.(1926–45); Glengarry, Ont. (1945–49); 10th Prime Minister	August 7, 1919 – August 7, 1948	29 years, 0 days	14th (1921); 15th (1925); 16th (1926); 17th (1930); 18th (1935); 19th (1940); 20th (1945)	Meighen; 13th (1926–26)
4	Rt. Hon. William Lyon; Mackenzie King (1874–1950); MP for Prince, P.E.I. (1919–21); York North, Ont. (1921–25); Prince Albert, Sask.(1926–45); Glengarry, Ont. (1945–49); 10th Prime Minister	August 7, 1919 – August 7, 1948	29 years, 0 days	14th (1921); 15th (1925); 16th (1926); 17th (1930); 18th (1935); 19th (1940); 20th (1945)	King; 14th (1926–30)
4	Rt. Hon. William Lyon; Mackenzie King (1874–1950); MP for Prince, P.E.I. (1919–21); York North, Ont. (1921–25); Prince Albert, Sask.(1926–45); Glengarry, Ont. (1945–49); 10th Prime Minister	August 7, 1919 – August 7, 1948	29 years, 0 days	14th (1921); 15th (1925); 16th (1926); 17th (1930); 18th (1935); 19th (1940); 20th (1945)	Bennett; 15th (1930–35)
4	Rt. Hon. William Lyon; Mackenzie King (1874–1950); MP for Prince, P.E.I. (1919–21); York North, Ont. (1921–25); Prince Albert, Sask.(1926–45); Glengarry, Ont. (1945–49); 10th Prime Minister	August 7, 1919 – August 7, 1948	29 years, 0 days	14th (1921); 15th (1925); 16th (1926); 17th (1930); 18th (1935); 19th (1940); 20th (1945)	King; 16th (1935–48)
5	Rt. Hon. Louis St. Laurent (1882–1973); MP for Quebec East, Que. 12th Prime Minister	August 7, 1948 – January 16, 1958	9 years, 162 days	21st (1949); 22nd (1953); 23rd (1957)	St. Laurent; 17th (1948–57)
5	Rt. Hon. Louis St. Laurent (1882–1973); MP for Quebec East, Que. 12th Prime Minister	August 7, 1948 – January 16, 1958	9 years, 162 days	21st (1949); 22nd (1953); 23rd (1957)	Diefenbaker; 18th (1957–63)
6	Rt. Hon. Lester B. Pearson (1897–1972); MP for Algoma East, Ont. 14th Prime Minister	January 16, 1958 – April 6, 1968	10 years, 81 days	24th (1958); 25th (1962); 26th (1963); 27th (1965)	Diefenbaker; 18th (1957–63)
6	Rt. Hon. Lester B. Pearson (1897–1972); MP for Algoma East, Ont. 14th Prime Minister	January 16, 1958 – April 6, 1968	10 years, 81 days	24th (1958); 25th (1962); 26th (1963); 27th (1965)	Pearson; 19th (1963–68)
7	Rt. Hon. Pierre Trudeau (1919–2000); MP for Mount Royal, Que. 15th Prime Minister	April 6, 1968 – June 16, 1984	16 years, 71 days	28th (1968); 29th (1972); 30th (1974); 31st (1979); 32nd (1980)	P. Trudeau; 20th (1968–79)
7	Rt. Hon. Pierre Trudeau (1919–2000); MP for Mount Royal, Que. 15th Prime Minister	April 6, 1968 – June 16, 1984	16 years, 71 days	28th (1968); 29th (1972); 30th (1974); 31st (1979); 32nd (1980)	Clark; 21st (1979–80)
7	Rt. Hon. Pierre Trudeau (1919–2000); MP for Mount Royal, Que. 15th Prime Minister	April 6, 1968 – June 16, 1984	16 years, 71 days	28th (1968); 29th (1972); 30th (1974); 31st (1979); 32nd (1980)	P. Trudeau; 22nd (1980–84)
8	Rt. Hon. John Turner (1929–2020); MP for Vancouver Quadra, B.C. 17th Prime Minister	June 16, 1984 – June 23, 1990	6 years, 7 days	33rd (1984); 34th (1988)	Turner; 23th (1984–84)
8	Rt. Hon. John Turner (1929–2020); MP for Vancouver Quadra, B.C. 17th Prime Minister	June 16, 1984 – June 23, 1990	6 years, 7 days	33rd (1984); 34th (1988)	Mulroney; 24th (1984–93)
9	Rt. Hon. Jean Chrétien (b. 1934); MP for Beauséjour, N.B. (1990–93); Saint-Maurice, Que. (1993–2003); 20th Prime Minister	June 23, 1990 – November 14, 2003	13 years, 144 days	35th (1993); 36th (1997); 37th (2000)	Mulroney; 24th (1984–93)
9	Rt. Hon. Jean Chrétien (b. 1934); MP for Beauséjour, N.B. (1990–93); Saint-Maurice, Que. (1993–2003); 20th Prime Minister	June 23, 1990 – November 14, 2003	13 years, 144 days	35th (1993); 36th (1997); 37th (2000)	Campbell; 25th (1993–93)
9	Rt. Hon. Jean Chrétien (b. 1934); MP for Beauséjour, N.B. (1990–93); Saint-Maurice, Que. (1993–2003); 20th Prime Minister	June 23, 1990 – November 14, 2003	13 years, 144 days	35th (1993); 36th (1997); 37th (2000)	Chrétien; 26th (1993–2003)
10	Rt. Hon. Paul Martin (b. 1938); MP for LaSalle—Émard, Que. 21st Prime Minister	November 14, 2003 – March 19, 2006	2 years, 125 days	38th (2004); 39th (2006)	Martin; 27th (2003–06)
10	Rt. Hon. Paul Martin (b. 1938); MP for LaSalle—Émard, Que. 21st Prime Minister	November 14, 2003 – March 19, 2006	2 years, 125 days	38th (2004); 39th (2006)	Harper; 28th (2006–15)
—	Hon. Bill Graham (1939–2022); MP for Toronto Centre, Ont. Interim Leader	March 19, 2006 (Note: Assumed parliamentary leadership and the role of Leader of the Opposition on February 6, 2006) – December 2, 2006	258 days (interim)		Harper; 28th (2006–15)
11	Hon. Stéphane Dion (b. 1955); MP for Saint-Laurent—Cartierville, Que.	December 2, 2006 – December 10, 2008	2 years and 8 days	40th (2008)	Harper; 28th (2006–15)
12	Hon. Michael Ignatieff (b. 1947); MP for Etobicoke—Lakeshore, Ont.	December 10, 2008 – May 25, 2011 (Interim leader until May 2, 2009)	2 years, 166 days (Note: interim: 4 months and 22 days; permanent: 2 years and 23 days)	41st (2011)	Harper; 28th (2006–15)
—	Hon. Bob Rae (b. 1948); MP for Toronto Centre, Ont. Interim Leader	May 25, 2011 – April 14, 2013	1 year, 324 days (interim)		Harper; 28th (2006–15)
13	Rt. Hon. Justin Trudeau (b. 1971); MP for Papineau, Que. 23rd Prime Minister	April 14, 2013 – March 9, 2025	11 years, 329 days	42nd (2015); 43rd (2019); 44th (2021)	Harper; 28th (2006–15)
13	Rt. Hon. Justin Trudeau (b. 1971); MP for Papineau, Que. 23rd Prime Minister	April 14, 2013 – March 9, 2025	11 years, 329 days	42nd (2015); 43rd (2019); 44th (2021)	J. Trudeau; 29th (2015–25)
14	Rt. Hon. Mark Carney (b. 1965); MP for Nepean, Ont. 24th Prime Minister	March 9, 2025 – present	1 year, 7 months and 16 days	45th (2025)	Carney; 30th (since 2025)

== Other key leadership roles ==
=== Deputy leaders and deputy prime ministers ===
Liberal Party leaders had from time to time formally designated a deputy. Deputy leaders were appointed only while the party was in opposition. While the party was in the government, the title Deputy Prime Minister was from time to time conferred upon a member of the cabinet. The deputies' formal responsibilities and authorities varied depending on a variety of factors, such as the party's electoral circumstances, their and the leaders' respective political statures, and their relationships with their leaders.

Until recent decades, most party leaders has named one of their former leadership rivals as their deputy at some point during their leadership, including: Pierre Trudeau (Paul Hellyer, Allan MacEachen), John Turner (Jean Chrétien), Jean Chrétien (Sheila Copps) and Stéphane Dion (Michael Ignatieff). That practice was less frequently followed by leaders since the turn of the millennium. Paul Martin excluded all rivals, including those who withdrew and endorsed him before the convention, from his cabinet. The three most recent leaders each placed at least one rival on their front bench without naming them deputy, the three being: Michael Ignatieff (Bob Rae as foreign affairs critic, Scott Brison as finance critic), Justin Trudeau (Marc Garneau as transport and then foreign minister, Joyce Murray as President of the Treasury Board) and Mark Carney (Chrystia Freeland as transport minister).

- Following his election as party leader in 1968, Pierre Trudeau designated Paul Hellyer, a leadership rival who placed second to Trudeau on first ballot, as "Senior Minister" in his cabinet. The ceremonial title put Hellyer ahead of other cabinet colleagues in the order of precedence. Upon the absence of the prime minister, the senior minister would act on behalf of the prime minister. In addition to retaining the transport portfolio held in the Pearson ministry, Hellyer was assigned special responsibility by Trudeau for a new federal task force on housing and urban development. The task force tabled its report within a year calling for greater role by the federal government in housing, which conflicted with Trudeau's view of federalism. The disagreements over the implementation of the report led to Hellyer's resignation from Trudeau's cabinet after just shy of a year, and the title Senior Minister has not been revived since.
- After having led the party back to government in 2015, Justin Trudeau did not name long time deputy leader Ralph Goodale as deputy prime minister, and the title was left dormant while Goodale was in parliament. Following the 2019 federal election, during which Goodale lost his parliamentary seat, Trudeau named Chrystia Freeland Deputy Prime Minister, and in 2020 made her the first female finance minister in Canadian history. She held the position until her dramatic resignation from cabinet in December 2024 hours before she was to deliver the fall economic statement, citing policy disagreements with Trudeau on tax breaks, disbursements, and response to tariffs proposed by US President-elect Donald Trump. Her resignation sent shockwave across Canada and precipitated the end of Justin Trudeau's premiership. No deputy has been designated since Freeland's resignation.

==== List of deputies ====
Deputy Leader (Born-Died) Parliamentary seat (while deputy)	Term of office	Tenure	Deputy role (Ministry if Deputy PM) Concurrent roles	Leader (term)
Hon. Paul Hellyer (1923–2021); MP for Trinity	April 30, 1968 – April 23, 1969	358 days	Senior Minister (20th): Minister of Transport; Minister responsible for Housing	Pierre Trudeau (1968–84)
No deputy designated	April 23, 1969– September 16, 1977			Pierre Trudeau (1968–84)
Hon. Allan MacEachen (1921–2017); MP for Cape Breton Highlands—Canso	September 16, 1977 – June 4, 1979	6 years, 288 days	Deputy Prime Minister (20th): President of the Privy Council; Government House Leader	Pierre Trudeau (1968–84)
Hon. Allan MacEachen (1921–2017); MP for Cape Breton Highlands—Canso	June 4, 1979 – March 3, 1980	6 years, 288 days	Deputy Leader (unofficial) (Note: Not formally named deputy leader while the party was in opposition but generally recognized as such and referred by the press as such. MacEachen himself stated that he served as deputy leader of the opposition.): Opposition House Leader	Pierre Trudeau (1968–84)
Hon. Allan MacEachen (1921–2017); MP for Cape Breton Highlands—Canso	March 3, 1980 – June 30, 1984	6 years, 288 days	Deputy Prime Minister (22nd): Minister of Finance (until September 1982); Secretary of State for External Affairs (from September 1982)	Pierre Trudeau (1968–84)
Rt. Hon. Jean Chrétien (b. 1934); MP for Saint-Maurice	June 30, 1984 – September 17, 1984	79 days	Deputy Prime Minister (23rd): Secretary of State for External Affairs; Minister responsible for La Francophonie	John Turner (1984–90)
No deputy designated	September 17, 1984– January 10, 1989			John Turner (1984–90)
Rt. Hon. Herb Gray (1931–2014); MP for Windsor West	January 10, 1989 – January 30, 1991	2 years, 20 days	Deputy Leader: Opposition House Leader (Sept 1984 – Feb 1990) (Note: Gray initially stated that the deputy title applied only to parliamentary duties, but party president Michel Robert later clarified that Gray was authorized to represent Turner in party matters.); Leader of the Opposition (Feb – Dec 1990) (Note: Gray assumed the parliamentary leadership on February 7, 1990 while Turner retained party leadership until leadership convention. Gray remain parliamentary leader until new leader Jean Chretien regained a parliamentary seat in a byelection held on December 10, 1990.)	John Turner (1984–90)
Rt. Hon. Herb Gray (1931–2014); MP for Windsor West	January 10, 1989 – January 30, 1991	2 years, 20 days	Deputy Leader: Opposition House Leader (Sept 1984 – Feb 1990); Leader of the Opposition (Feb – Dec 1990)	Jean Chrétien (1990–2003)
Hon. Sheila Copps (b. 1952); MP for Hamilton East	January 30, 1991 – November 4, 1993	6 years, 132 days	Deputy Leader (Note: Named deputy leader on January 30, 1991 and appointed Deputy Prime Minister when the Chretien ministry was formed.)	Jean Chrétien (1990–2003)
Hon. Sheila Copps (b. 1952); MP for Hamilton East	November 4, 1993 – June 11, 1997	6 years, 132 days	Deputy Prime Minister (26th) (Note: Strictly speaking, the office of deputy prime minister was vacant from April to June 1996 when Copps, after being challenged on her 1993 campaign promise to resign if the government did not repeal the Goods and Services Tax. Copps resigned from Parliament on May 1 and regained her seat in a byelection on June 17 and returned to same cabinet roles two days later. PM Chrétien did not name a replacement in cabinet during Copps's absence from Parliament.): Minister of the Environment (1993–96); Minister of Multiculturalism and Citizenship & Minister of Communications (1996) / Minister of Canadian Heritage (1996–2003)	Jean Chrétien (1990–2003)
Rt. Hon. Herb Gray (1931–2014); MP for Windsor West	June 11, 1997 – January 15, 2002	4 years, 218 days (Total: 6 years, 7 months and 24 days)	Deputy Prime Minister (26th): Minister responsible for the Millenium Bureau of Canada (1998–2002); Political minister for Ontario	Jean Chrétien (1990–2003)
Hon. John Manley (b. 1950); MP for Ottawa South	January 15, 2002 – December 12, 2003	1 year, 331 days	Deputy Prime Minister (26th): Minister of Finance (from May 2002)	Jean Chrétien (1990–2003)
Hon. Anne McLellan (b. 1950); MP for Edmonton West/Centre	December 12, 2003 – February 6, 2006	2 years, 56 days	Deputy Prime Minister (27th): Solicitor General / Minister of Public Safety and Emergency Preparedness	Paul Martin (2003–06)
Hon. Lucienne Robillard (b. 1952); MP for Westmount—Ville-Marie	February 26, 2006 – December 17, 2006	294 days	Deputy Leader	Bill Graham (Interim, 2006)
Hon. Michael Ignatieff (b. 1947); MP for Etobicoke–Lakeshore	December 18, 2006 – November 13, 2008	1 year, 10 months and 26 days	Deputy Leader	Stéphane Dion (2006–08)
No deputy designated	November 13, 2008 – September 7, 2010			Stéphane Dion (2006–08)
No deputy designated	November 13, 2008 – September 7, 2010			Michael Ignatieff (2008–11)
Hon. Ralph Goodale (b. 1949); MP for Wascana	September 7, 2010 – November 3, 2015	5 years, 57 days	Deputy Leader	Michael Ignatieff (2008–11)
Hon. Ralph Goodale (b. 1949); MP for Wascana	September 7, 2010 – November 3, 2015	5 years, 57 days	Deputy Leader	Bob Rae (Interim, 2011–13)
Hon. Ralph Goodale (b. 1949); MP for Wascana	September 7, 2010 – November 3, 2015	5 years, 57 days	Deputy Leader	Justin Trudeau (2013–25)
No deputy designated (Note: Prime Minister Justice Trudeau did not name a deputy prime minister at the initial formation of his ministry. However, he formally placed Goodale as first in line to assume the prime minister's powers and duties as acting prime minister should he become incapacitated. Trudeau did not appoint a deputy prime minister while Goodale was in parliament.)	November 3, 2015 – November 19, 2019			Justin Trudeau (2013–25)
Hon. Chrystia Freeland (b. 1968); MP for University—Rosedale	November 20, 2019 – December 16, 2024	5 years, 26 days	Deputy Prime Minister (29th): Minister of Intergovernmental Affairs (2019–20); Minister of Finance (2020–24)	Justin Trudeau (2013–25)
No deputy designated	December 16, 2024 – present			Justin Trudeau (2013–25)
No deputy designated	December 16, 2024 – present			Mark Carney (2025–)

=== Party presidents ===
- Vincent Massey 1932–1935
- Norman Platt Lambert 1936–1941
- Vacant 1941–1943
- Norman Alexander McLarty 1943 (acting)
- Wishart McLea Robertson 1943–1945
- James Gordon Fogo 1946–1952
- Duncan Kenneth MacTavish 1952–1958
- Bruce Matthews 1958–1961
- John Joseph Connolly 1961–1964
- John Lang Nichol 1964–1968
- Richard Stanbury 1968–1973
- Gildas Molgat 1973–1976
- Alasdair Graham 1976–1980
- Norman MacLeod 1980–1982
- Iona Campagnolo 1982–1986
- J. J. Michel Robert 1986–1990
- Don Johnston 1990–1994
- Dan Hays 1994–1998
- Stephen LeDrew 1998–2003
- Michael Eizenga 2003–2006
- Marie Poulin 2006–2008
- Doug Ferguson 2008–2009
- Alfred Apps 2009–2012
- Mike Crawley 2012–2014
- Anna Gainey 2014–2018
- Suzanne Cowan 2018–2023
- Sachit Mehra 2023–present

== See also ==
- History of the Liberal Party of Canada
- Liberal Party of Canada leadership elections
- Leader of the Conservative Party of Canada
- Leader of the New Democratic Party
