= History of the Liberal Party of Canada =

Aspect of Canadian political history

This article covers the history of the Liberal Party of Canada.

== Party systems model ==
According to recent scholarship, there have been four party systems in Canada at the federal level since Confederation, each with its own distinctive pattern of social support, patronage relationships, leadership styles, and electoral strategies.

- The first party system emerged from pre-Confederation colonial politics, had its "heyday" from 1896 to 1911 and lasted until the Conscription Crisis of 1917, and was characterized by local patronage administered by the two largest parties, the Liberals and the Conservatives.
- The second system emerged following the First World War, and had its heyday from 1935 and 1957, was characterized by regionalism and saw the emergence of several protest parties, such as the Progressives, the Social Credit Party, and the Co-operative Commonwealth Federation.
- The third system emerged in 1963 and had its heyday from 1968 to 1983 and began to unravel thereafter. The two largest parties were challenged by a strong third party, the New Democratic Party. Campaigns during this era became more national in scope due to the electronic media, and involved a greater focus on leadership. The dominant policy of the era was Keynesian economics.
- The fourth party system has involved the rise of the Reform Party, the Bloc Québécois, and the merger of the Canadian Alliance with the Progressive Conservatives. It saw most parties move to one-member-one-vote leadership contests, and a major reform to campaign finance laws in 2004. The fourth party system has been characterized by market-oriented policies that abandoned Keynesian policies, but maintained the welfare state.

Clarkson (2005) shows how the Liberal Party had dominated all the party systems, using different approaches. It began with a "clientelistic approach" under Sir Wilfrid Laurier, which evolved into a "brokerage" system of the 1920s, 1930s and 1940s under William Lyon Mackenzie King. The 1950s saw the emergence of a "pan-Canadian system", which lasted until the 1990s. The 1993 election — categorized by Clarkson as an electoral "earthquake" which "fragmented" the party system, saw the emergence of regional politics within a four party-system, whereby various groups championed regional issues and concerns. Clarkson concludes that the inherent bias built into the first-past-the-post system, had chiefly benefited the Liberals.

== 19th century ==
=== Origins ===
The Liberals are descended from the mid-19th century Reformers who agitated for responsible government throughout British North America. These included George Brown, Robert Baldwin, William Lyon Mackenzie and the Clear Grits in Upper Canada, Joseph Howe in Nova Scotia, and the Patriotes and Rouges in Lower Canada led by figures such as Louis-Joseph Papineau. The Clear Grits and Parti rouge sometimes functioned as a united bloc in the legislature of the Province of Canada beginning in 1854, but a united Liberal Party combining both English and French Canadian members was not formed until 1867.

=== Confederation ===
At the time of confederation of the former British colonies of Canada (now Ontario and Quebec), New Brunswick and Nova Scotia, the radical Liberals were marginalized by the more pragmatic Conservative coalition assembled under Sir John A. Macdonald. In the 29 years after Canadian Confederation, the Liberals were consigned to opposition, with the exception of one stint in government. Alexander Mackenzie was able to lead the party to power in 1873 after the Macdonald government lost a vote of no confidence in the House of Commons because of the Pacific Scandal. Mackenzie won the 1874 election, but lost the government to Macdonald in 1878. Liberals spent the next 18 years in opposition.

In dealing with labour unions, the laissez-faire Liberals under Mackenzie, George Brown and Edward Blake were anti-labour, while Conservatives under Macdonald were pro-labour in the process of making their National Policy work to raise wages (and profits) by imposing a tariff on imports. Macdonald was an important financial supporter of the labor newspaper and friend of trade-union leaders, who in turn aided his party during the election campaigns of the decade.

==== Provinces ====
In Ontario, the Liberal Party under Oliver Mowat controlled the provincial government and advocated the rights of provinces. He was in close touch with Catholic officials, and received the Irish Catholic vote.

In Prince Edward Island during the 1860s the issue of confederation split the colony's Conservative Party leadership in 1864–65, but after that the central issues were sectarianism and absentee landownership. The defection of rural supporters from the Conservatives allowed the Liberals to win the 1867 provincial election. But the issue of denominational grants to schools cost the Liberals their Roman Catholic support in 1870, and resulted in a coalition government that ruled the island for 17 of the next 21 years.

The Nova Scotia Liberal Party fared poorly in national elections during the 1880s and early 1890s. The national party advocated policies that would discontinue the national coal subsidy and, for all practical purposes, eliminate Catholic schools in Manitoba, policies disliked by provincial coal miners and Catholics respectively. William Stevens Fielding influenced a more moderate coal policy and defused the school issue. Thus in 1896 the provincial Liberals improved their showing in the national election.

=== Laurier era ===
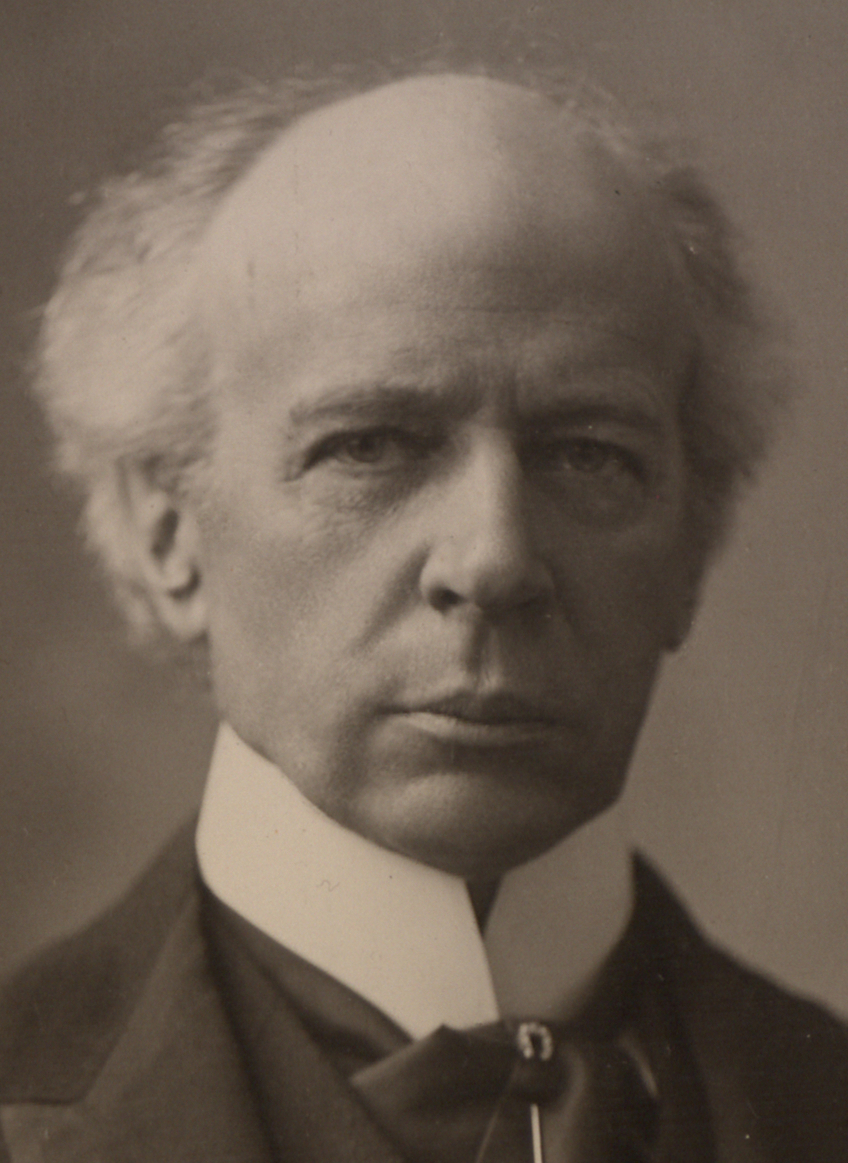
Sir Wilfrid Laurier

In their early history, the Liberals were the party of continentalism (free trade with the United States), and opposition to imperialism. The Liberals also became identified with the aspirations of Quebecers as a result of the growing hostility of French-Canadians to the Conservatives. The Conservatives lost the support of Quebecers because of the perceived role of Conservative governments in the execution of Louis Riel, and their role in the Conscription crisis of 1917.

It was not until Wilfrid Laurier became leader that the Liberal Party emerged as a modern party. Laurier was able to capitalize on the Conservatives' apparent alienation of French Canada by offering the Liberals as a credible alternative. Laurier was able to overcome the party's reputation for anti-clericalism that offended the still-powerful Quebec Roman Catholic Church. In English-speaking Canada, the Liberal Party's support for free trade made it popular among farmers, and helped cement the party's hold in the growing prairie provinces.

Laurier led the Liberals to power in the 1896 election (in which he became the first Francophone Prime Minister), and oversaw a government that increased immigration in order to settle Western Canada. Laurier's government created the provinces of Saskatchewan and Alberta out of the North-West Territories, and promoted the development of Canadian industry.

== 20th century ==
=== Loss of power ===
The Liberals lost power in the 1911 election due to opposition to the party's policies on reciprocity (or free trade), and the creation of a Canadian navy.

The Conscription crisis divided the party as many Liberals in English Canada supported conscription. Many of them joined Sir Robert Borden's Conservatives to form a Unionist government. With numerous Liberal candidates running as Unionists or Liberal-Unionists with the support of provincial Liberal parties in a number of provinces, the Laurier Liberals were reduced to a largely Quebec-based rump. The long-term impact of the Conscription crisis benefited the party as the issue only added to the animosity of French-Canadians towards the Conservatives, making that party unpopular in Quebec for decades.

=== Canadian sovereignty ===
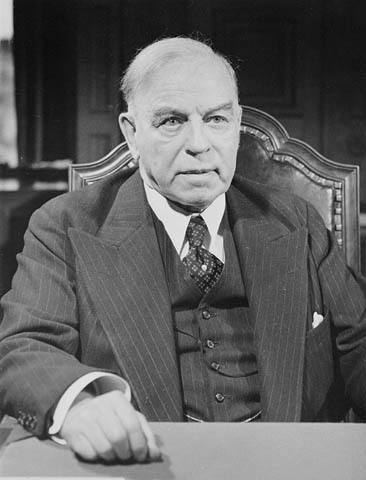
William Lyon Mackenzie King

Under Laurier, and his successor William Lyon Mackenzie King, the Liberals promoted Canadian sovereignty and greater independence from the British Empire. In Imperial Conferences held throughout the 1920s, Canadian Liberal governments often took the lead in arguing that the United Kingdom and the dominions should have equal status, and against proposals for an imperial parliament that would have subsumed Canadian independence. After the King-Byng Affair of 1926, the Liberals argued that the Governor General of Canada should no longer be appointed on the recommendation of the British government. The decisions of the Imperial Conferences were formalized in the Statute of Westminster, which was actually passed in 1931, the year after the Liberals lost power.

The Liberals also promoted the idea of Canada being responsible for its own foreign and defence policy. Initially, it was Britain which determined external affairs for the dominion. In 1905, Laurier created the Department of External Affairs, and in 1909 he advised Governor General Earl Grey to appoint the first Secretary of State for External Affairs to Cabinet. It was also Laurier who first proposed the creation of a Canadian Navy in 1910. Mackenzie King recommended the appointment by Governor General Lord Byng of Vincent Massey as the first Canadian ambassador to Washington in 1926, marking the Liberal government's insistence on having direct relations with the United States, rather than having Britain act on Canada's behalf.

=== Liberals and the social safety net ===
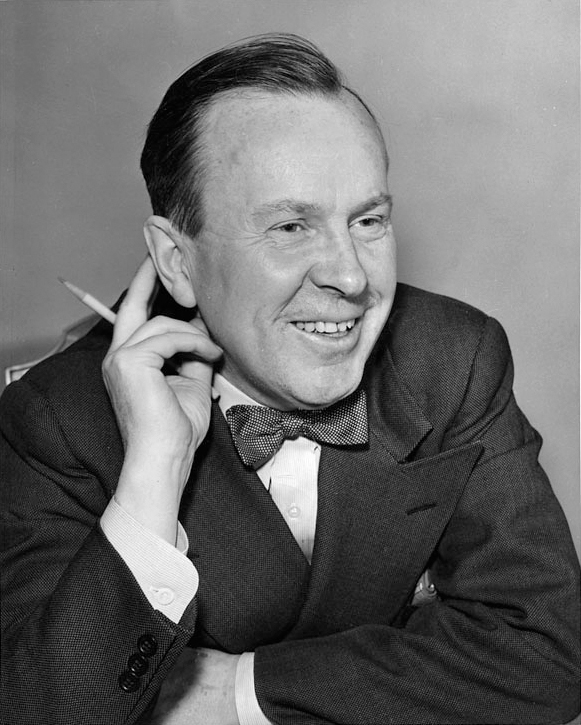
Lester B. Pearson

In the period just before and after the Second World War, the party became a champion of 'progressive social policy'.

As prime minister for most of the time between 1921 and 1948, King introduced several measures that led to the creation of Canada's social safety net. Bowing to popular pressure, he introduced the mother's allowance, a monthly payment to all mothers with young children. He also reluctantly introduced old age pensions when J. S. Woodsworth required it in exchange for his Co-operative Commonwealth Federation party's support of King's minority government. Later, Lester B. Pearson introduced universal health care, the Canada Pension Plan, Canada Student Loans, and the Canada Assistance Plan (which provided funding for provincial welfare programs).

=== Pierre Trudeau era ===
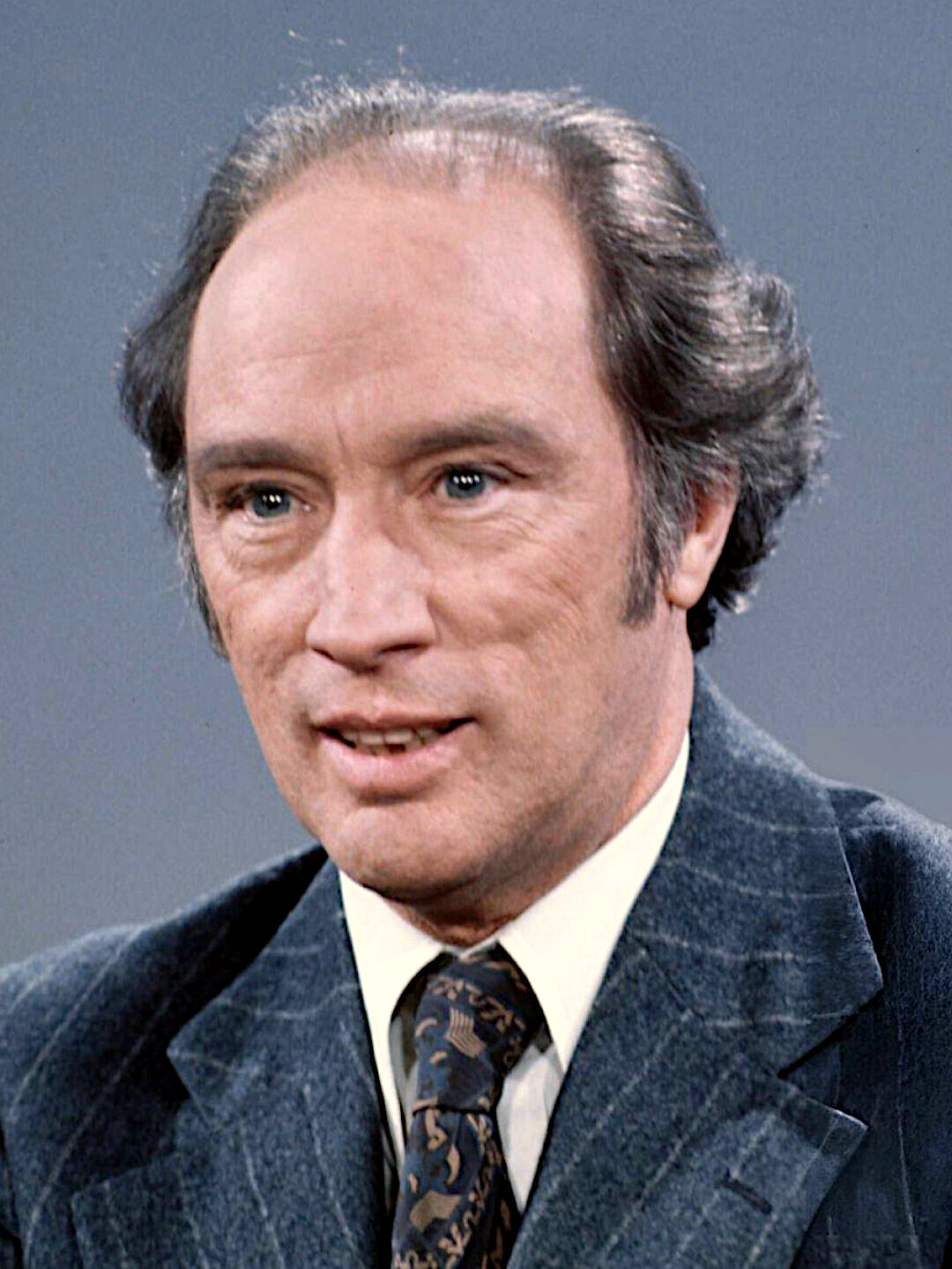
Pierre Trudeau

Under Pierre Trudeau, the mission of a progressive social policy evolved into the goal of creating a "just society".

The Trudeau Liberals became the champions of official bilingualism, passing the Official Languages Act, which gave the French and English languages equal status in Canada. Trudeau hoped that the promotion of bilingualism would cement Quebec's place in Confederation, and counter growing calls for an independent Quebec. This policy aimed to transform Canada into a country where English and French-Canadians could live together in comfort and could move to any part of the country without losing their language. While this has not occurred, official bilingualism has helped halt the French language decline outside of Quebec. It has also ensured that all federal government services (as well as radio and television services provided by the government-owned Canadian Broadcasting Corporation/Radio-Canada) are available in both languages throughout the country.

The Trudeau Liberals are also credited with support for official multiculturalism as a means of integrating immigrants into Canadian society without forcing them to shed their culture. As a result of this and a more sympathetic attitude by Liberals towards immigration policy, the party has built a support base among recent immigrants and their children.

The most lasting effect of the Trudeau years has been the patriation of the Canadian constitution and the creation of Canada's Charter of Rights. Trudeau Liberals support the concept of a strong, central government, and fought Quebec separatism, other forms of Quebec nationalism, and the granting of "distinct society" status to Quebec. Such actions, however, served as rallying cries for sovereigntists & alienated many francophone Quebecers

The other primary legacy of the Trudeau years has been financial. Net federal debt in fiscal 1968, just before Trudeau became prime minister, was about $18-billion, or 26 percent of a gross domestic product; by his final year in office, it had ballooned to $206-billion– at 46 percent of GDP, nearly twice as large relative to the economy.

From the fiscal years 1976 to 1985, the government ran not only an overall deficit but an operating deficit. The overall deficit throughout the latter phase never fell below 3 percent of GDP; it averaged 5.6 percent. In the final year of Liberal rule, 1984–85, total spending exceeded revenues by more than 50 percent. The deficit that year, at $38.5 billion, was equal to nearly 9 percent of GDP. Interest payments alone were now enough to consume nearly one-third of all revenues dollar. With interest costs typically between 10 and 20 percent during the period, compounding interest contributed to a total nominal debt increased approximately tenfold during his premierships.

=== The post-Pierre Trudeau party in opposition ===
After Trudeau's retirement in 1984, many Liberals, such as Jean Chrétien and Clyde Wells, continued to adhere to Trudeau's concept of federalism. Others, such as John Turner, supported the failed Meech Lake and Charlottetown Constitutional Accords, which would have recognized Quebec as a "distinct society" and would have increased the powers of the provinces to the detriment of the federal government.

Trudeau stepped down as prime minister and party leader in 1984, as the Liberals were slipping in polls. At that year's leadership convention, Turner defeated Chrétien on the second ballot to become prime minister. Immediately, upon taking office, Turner called a snap election, citing favourable internal polls. However, party was hurt by numerous patronage appointments, many of which Turner had made supposedly in return for Trudeau retiring early. Also, they were unpopular in their traditional stronghold of Quebec due to the constitution repatriation which excluded that province. The Liberals lost power in the 1984 election, and were reduced to only 40 seats in the House of Commons. The Progressive Conservatives won a majority of the seats in every province, including Quebec. The 95-seat loss was the worst defeat in the party's history, and the worst defeat at the time for a governing party at the federal level. What was more, the New Democratic Party, successor to the CCF, won only ten fewer seats than the Liberals, and some thought that the NDP under Ed Broadbent would push the Liberals to third-party status.

The party began a long process of reconstruction. A small group of young Liberal MPs, known as the Rat Pack, gained fame by criticizing the Progressive Conservative government of Brian Mulroney at every turn. Also, despite public and backroom attempts to remove Turner as leader, he managed to consolidate his leadership at the 1986 review.

The 1988 election was notable for Turner's strong opposition to the Canada-U.S. Free Trade Agreement negotiated by Progressive Conservative Prime Minister Brian Mulroney. Although most Canadians voted for parties opposed to free trade, the PCs were returned with a majority government, and implemented the deal. The Liberals recovered from their near-meltdown of 1984, however, winning 83 seats and ending much of the talk of being eclipsed by the NDP.

=== Chrétien era ===
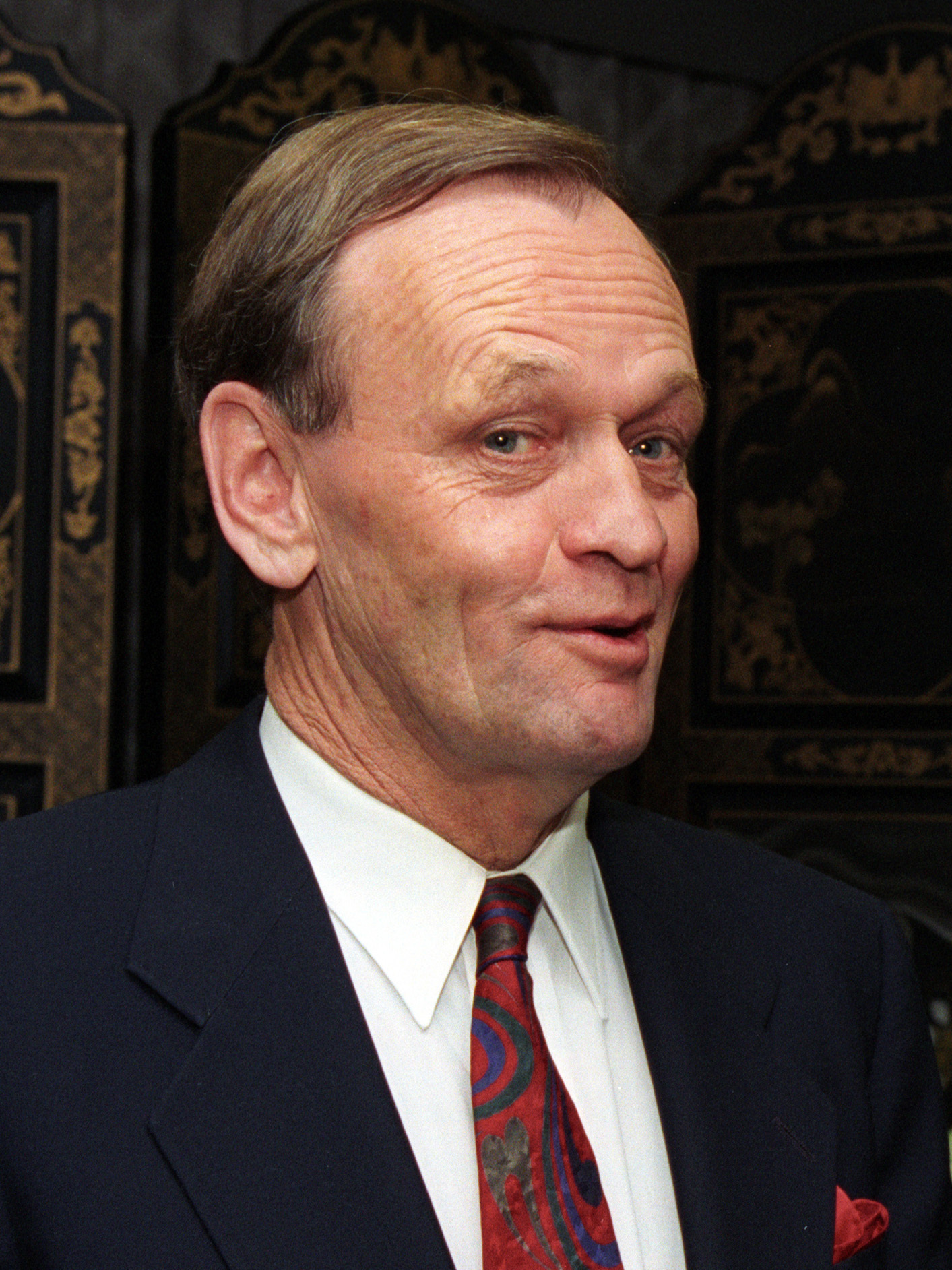
Jean Chrétien

Turner resigned in 1990 due to growing discontent within the party with his leadership, and was replaced by bitter rival Jean Chrétien, who had served in every Liberal cabinet since 1965. Chrétien's Liberals campaigned in the 1993 election on the promise of renegotiating the North American Free Trade Agreement (NAFTA), and eliminating the Goods and Services Tax (GST). Just after the writ was dropped for the election, they issued the Red Book, a detailed statement of exactly what the Liberals would do in office if they won power. This was unprecedented for a Canadian party. Taking full advantage of the inability of Mulroney's successor, Kim Campbell to overcome a large amount of antipathy toward Mulroney, they won a strong majority government with 177 seats—the third-best performance in party history, and their best since 1949. The Progressive Conservatives were cut down to only two seats, suffering a defeat even more severe than the one they had handed the Liberals nine years earlier. The Liberals were re-elected with a considerably reduced majority in 1997, but nearly tied their 1993 total in 2000.

For the next decade, the Liberals dominated Canadian politics in a fashion not seen since the early years of Confederation. This was because of the destruction of the "grand coalition" of Western socially conservative populists, Quebec nationalists, and fiscal conservatives from Ontario that had supported the Progressive Conservatives in 1984 and 1988. The PCs' Western support, for all practical purposes, transferred en masse to the Western-based Reform Party, which replaced the PCs as the major right-wing party in Canada. However, the new party's agenda was seen as too conservative for most Canadians. It only won one seat east of Manitoba in an election (but gained another in a floor-crossing). Even when Reform restructured into the Canadian Alliance, the party was virtually nonexistent east of Manitoba, winning only 66 seats in 2000. Reform/Alliance was the official opposition from 1997 to 2003, but was never able to overcome wide perceptions that it was merely a Western protest party. The Quebec nationalists who had once supported the PCs largely switched their support to the sovereigntist Bloc Québécois, while the PCs' support in Ontario and the Atlantic provinces largely moved to the Liberals. The PCs would never be a major force in Canadian politics again; while they rebounded to 20 seats in the next election, they won only two seats west of Quebec in the next decade.

Ontario and Quebec are guaranteed a majority of seats in the House of Commons under both Constitution Acts (59 percent of the seats). As a result, it is very difficult to form even a minority government without substantial support in Ontario and/or Quebec. It is mathematically impossible to form a majority government without winning the most seats in either Ontario or Quebec. While it is mathematically possible to form a minority government without a strong base in either province, but such an undertaking is politically difficult. The Liberals were the only party with a strong base in both provinces, thus making them the only party capable of forming a government.

There was some disappointment as Liberals were not able to recover their traditional dominant position in Quebec, despite being led by a Quebecer from a strongly nationalist region of Quebec. The Bloc capitalized on discontent with the failure of the 1990 Meech Lake Accord and Chrétien's uncompromising stance on federalism (see below) to win the most seats in Quebec in every election from 1993 onward, even serving as the official opposition from 1993 to 1997. Chrétien's reputation in his home province never recovered after the 1990 leadership convention when rival Paul Martin forced him to declare his opposition to the Meech Lake Accord. However, the Liberals did increase their support in the next two elections due to infighting within the Bloc. In the 1997 election, although the Liberals finished with a thin majority, it was their gains in Quebec which were credited with offsetting their losses in the Maritime provinces. In particular, the 2000 election was a breakthrough for the Liberals after the PQ government's unpopular initiatives regarding consolidation of several Quebec urban areas into "megacities." Many federal Liberals also took credit for Charest's provincial election victory over the PQ in spring 2003. A series of by-elections allowed the Liberals to gain a majority of Quebec ridings for the first time since 1984.

The Chrétien Liberals more than made up for their shortfall in Quebec by building a strong base in Ontario. They reaped a substantial windfall from the votes of fiscally conservative and socially liberal voters who had previously voted Progressive Conservative, as well as rapid growth in the Greater Toronto Area. They were also able to take advantage of massive vote splitting between the PCs and Reform/Alliance in rural areas of the province that had traditionally formed the backbone of provincial Progressive Conservative governments. Combined with their historic dominance of Metro Toronto and northern Ontario, the Liberals dominated the province's federal politics even as the PCs won landslide majorities at the provincial level. In 1993, for example, the Liberals won all but one seat in Ontario, and came within 123 votes in Simcoe Centre of pulling off the first clean sweep of Canada's most populated province. They were able to retain their position as the largest party in the House by winning all but two seats in Ontario in the 1997 election. The Liberals were assured of at least a minority government once the Ontario results came in, but it was not clear until later in the night that they would retain their majority. In 2000, the Liberals won all but three seats in Ontario.

While the Chrétien Liberals campaigned from the left, their time in power is most marked by the cuts made to many programs in order to balance the federal budget. Chrétien had supported the Charlottetown Accord while in opposition, but in power opposed major concessions to Quebec and other provincialist factions. In contrast to their promises during the 1993 campaign, they implemented only minor changes to NAFTA, embraced the free trade concept and– with the exception of the replacement of the GST with the Harmonized Sales Tax in some Atlantic provinces– broke their promise to replace the GST.

After a proposal for Quebec independence was narrowly defeated in the 1995 Quebec referendum, the Liberals passed the "Clarity Act" which outlines the federal government's preconditions for negotiating provincial independence. In Chrétien's final days, he supported same-sex marriage in Canada as well as decriminalizing the possession of small quantities of marijuana. Chrétien displeased the United States government when he pledged on March 17, 2003 that Canada would not support the 2003 invasion of Iraq. Polling released a month later showed the decision was largely popular, with 62% in favour of the Prime Minister's decision, and 35% opposed. Later polls would increase that margin of support.

== Into the 21st century ==
=== Martin succeeds Chrétien ===
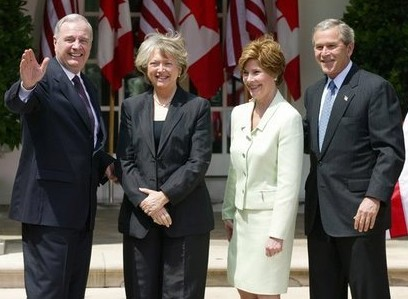
Paul and Sheila Martin with George and Laura Bush.

Paul Martin succeeded Chrétien as party leader and prime minister in 2003. Despite the personal rivalry between the two, Martin was the architect of the Liberals' economic policies as Minister of Finance during the 1990s. Chrétien left office with a high approval rating and Martin was expected to take the Liberals to greater heights. While his cabinet choices provoked some controversy over excluding many Chrétien supporters, it at first did little to hurt his popularity. However, the political situation changed with the revelation of the sponsorship scandal, in which advertising agencies supporting the Liberal Party received grossly inflated commissions for their services.

Having faced a divided conservative opposition for the past three elections, Liberals were seriously challenged by competition from the newly united Conservative Party led by Stephen Harper. The infighting between Martin and Chrétien's supporters also dogged the party. Nonetheless, by criticizing the Conservatives' social policies, the Liberals were able to draw progressive votes from the NDP which made the difference in several close races. On June 28, 2004 federal election, the Martin Liberals retained enough support to continue as the government, though they were reduced to a minority.

In the ensuing months, testimony from the Gomery Commission caused public opinion to turn sharply against the Liberals for the first time in over a decade. Despite the devastating revelations, only two Liberal MPs--David Kilgour (who had, ironically, crossed the floor from the PC Party in 1990) and Pat O'Brien—left the party for reasons other than the scandal. Belinda Stronach, who crossed the floor from the Conservatives to the Liberals, gave Martin the number of votes needed, although barely, to hold onto power when an NDP-sponsored amendment to his budget was passed only by the Speaker's tiebreaking vote on May 19, 2005.

In November, the Liberals dropped in polls following the release of the first Gomery Report. Nonetheless, Martin turned down the NDP's conditions for continued support, as well as rejected an opposition proposal which would schedule a February 2006 election in return for passing several pieces of legislation. The Liberals thus lost the no-confidence vote on November 28; Martin thus became only the fifth prime minister to lose the confidence of the House, but the first to lose on a straight no-confidence motion. Due to the Christmas holiday, Martin advised Governor General Michaëlle Jean to dissolve Parliament and call an election for January 2006.

The Liberal campaign was dogged from start to finish by the sponsorship scandal, which was brought up by a Royal Canadian Mounted Police (RCMP) criminal investigation into the leak of the income trust announcement. Numerous gaffes, contrasting with a smoothly run Conservative campaign, put Liberals as many as ten points behind the Conservatives in opinion polling. They managed to recover some of their momentum by election night, but not enough to retain power. They won 103 seats, a net loss of 30 from when the writs were dropped, losing a similar number of seats in Ontario and Quebec to the PCs. However, the Liberals managed to capture the most seats in Ontario for the fifth straight election (54 to the PCs' 40), holding the Conservatives to a minority government. While the Conservatives captured many of Ontario's rural ridings, the Liberals retained most of the population-rich Greater Toronto Area. Many of these ridings, particularly the 905 region, had historically been bellwethers (the Liberals were nearly shut out of this region in 1979 and 1984), but demographic changes have resulted in high Liberal returns in recent years.

Martin resigned as parliamentary leader after the election and stepped down as Liberal leader on March 18.

=== Dion and Ignatieff era ===
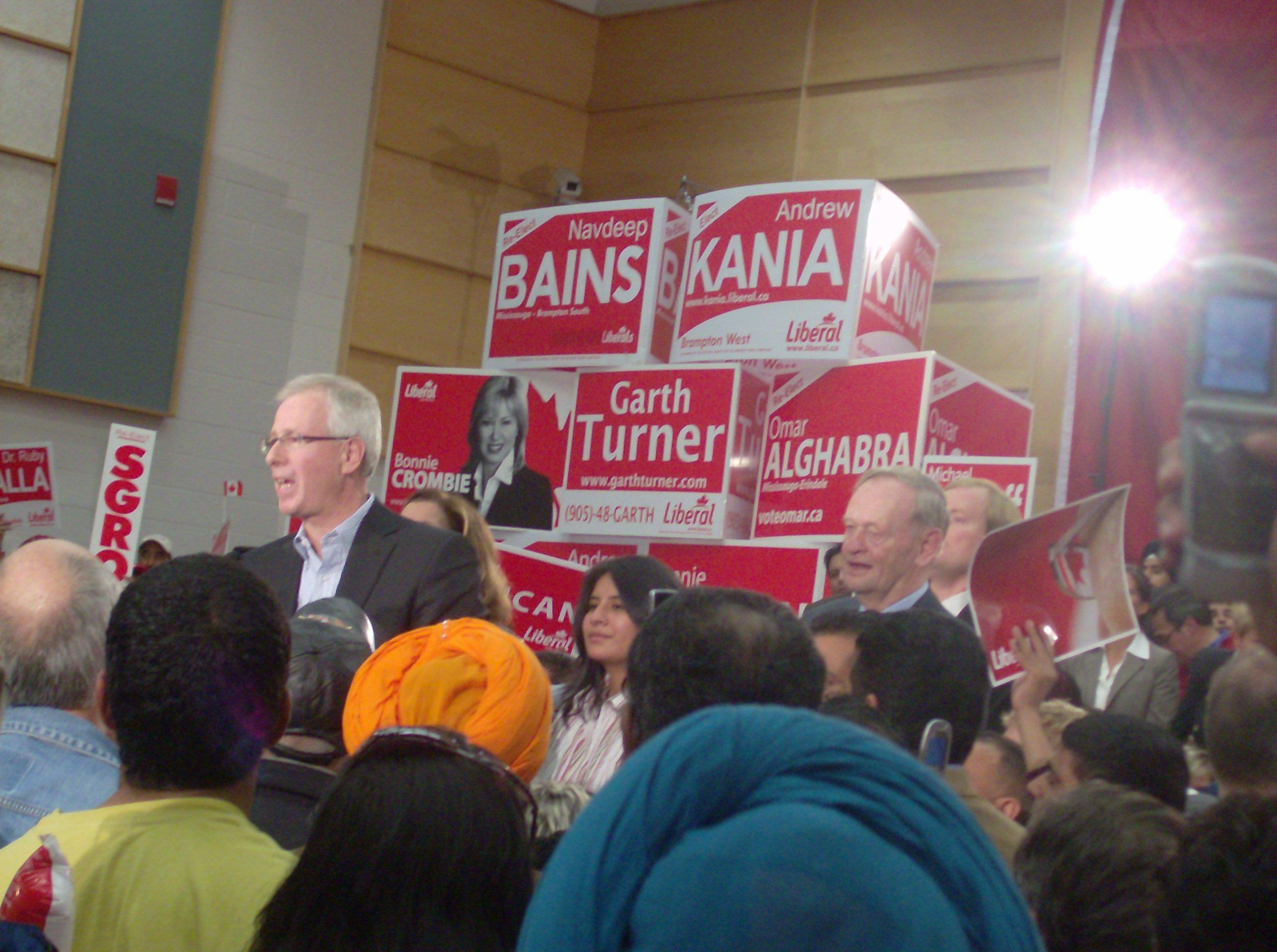
Stéphane Dion makes a speech on October 10, 2008 in Brampton West. Former Prime Minister Jean Chrétien was among notable Liberals at this rally; this was his first time campaigning for anyone since retirement.

Bill Graham was appointed interim party and parliamentary leader and the process to select a new party leader began. An unusually large number of prominent members such as Frank McKenna, Brian Tobin, Allan Rock and Belinda Stronach declined to run, yet at the same time many new faces stepped forward. There were eight people running for the leadership of the Liberal Party at the time of the convention:

- Martha Hall Findlay
- Stéphane Dion
- Michael Ignatieff
- Gerard Kennedy
- Bob Rae
- Scott Brison
- Ken Dryden
- Joe Volpe

The Liberal Party reportedly felt they could quickly regain power, so they accelerated the leadership selection process. While there were some predictions the party's National Executive would call the convention for as late as March 2007, it instead decided to announce the convention for the first weekend of December 2006.

On December 2 in Montreal, the Liberals voted for their new party leader. The first ballot results had Michael Ignatieff leading the pack with 30% of the delegates, Bob Rae second with 20%, and Stéphane Dion and Gerard Kennedy in third and fourth respectively with 16% of the votes each. The remaining contenders gathered less than 5% of the first ballot vote and Martha Hall Findlay was eliminated as she came in last on the first ballot, she endorsed Stéphane Dion for leader before voting began for the second ballot the next morning. Before voting began for the second ballot, Scott Brison and Joe Volpe voluntarily dropped out of the race, and both endorsed Bob Rae. The second ballot results showed Ignatieff again leading the way, with Rae in second, Dion in third, Kennedy in fourth, and Dryden in fifth. Dryden was thus eliminated, and he endorsed Bob Rae as well. Kennedy dropped out of the race and endorsed Stéphane Dion. Thus the third ballot came down to only Ignatieff, Rae and Dion. Dion jumped to first on the third ballot with Ignatieff and Rae falling to second and third respectively. Rae was eliminated, and Dion was elected leader over Ignatieff on the fourth ballot.

On May 11, 2006, Montreal's La Presse reported that the Government of Canada will file a lawsuit against the Liberal Party to recover all the money missing in the sponsorship program. Scott Brison told reporters that same day that the Liberals has already paid back the $1.14 million into the public purse, however the Conservatives believe that there is as much as $40 million unaccounted for in the sponsorship program.

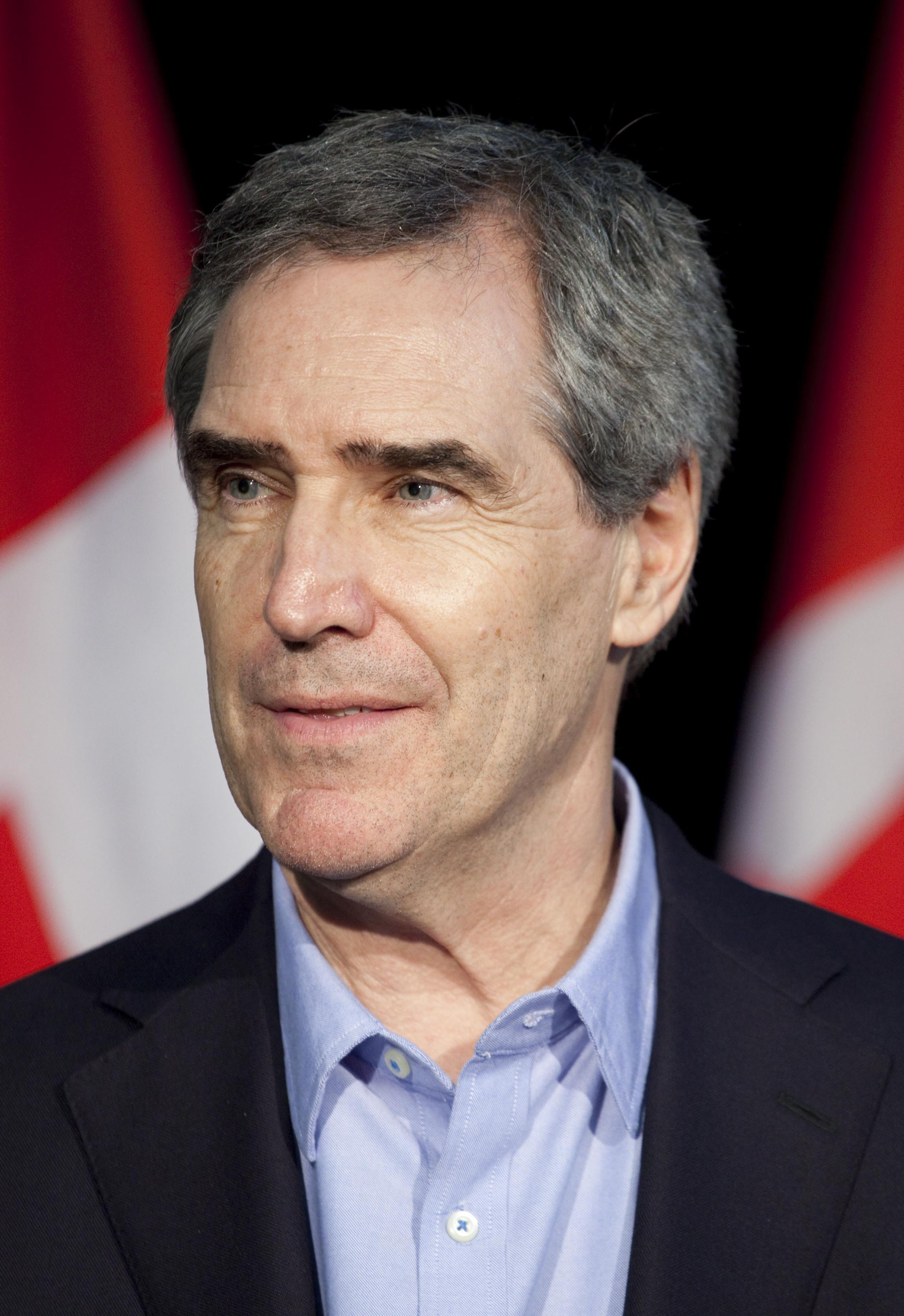
Michael Ignatieff, Leader (2008–2011)

On September 28, 2007, party national director Jamie Carroll, was criticized for comments he allegedly made in response to a suggestion that the Liberals should hire more francophone Quebecers to appeal to francophone voters. According to some persons present at a private meeting, Carroll said "Do we also have to hire people from the Chinese community to represent the Chinese community?". He later indicated that a statement he made was taken out of context. Several Quebec MPs and the president of the party's Quebec wing said that Carroll was quoted correctly, with Pablo Rodriguez and Liza Frulla demanding that he be fired. Dion affirmed Carroll's version of events, and rejected calls for his dismissal. Carroll initially threatened to sue for defamation and demand 12 to 18 months of severance, though Dion later had him quietly reassigned to another position.

British Columbia MP Blair Wilson was resigned from caucus and the shadow cabinet, after the Vancouver Province charged that he was involved in unlawful off-the-books cash spending, and that his private businesses had numerous discrepancies and unpaid debts. Wilson, who is being investigated, has denied the allegations.

Following Dion's resignation in 2008, Ignatieff was appointed interim leader. He was elected permanent leader with no opposition. The 2011 election was held after the House of Commons passed a motion of non-confidence against the government, finding it to be in contempt of Parliament. A few days before, the three opposition parties had rejected the Conservative minority government's proposed budget. The election was a disaster for the party, finishing with its worst result in party history. The party lost 43 seats, winning 34, and received less than 20% of the popular vote. The party finished in third, behind the New Democratic Party which formed the official opposition. For much of its history, the Liberal Party has been referred to as "Canada's Natural Governing Party", due to the party's election success and a turbulent Conservative Opposition. In the aftermath of the Liberal Party's poor performance in the 2011 federal election, there was speculation that the Conservative Party was in a position to replace the Liberals in that unofficial status. Ignatieff lost his own seat of Etobicoke—Lakeshore on election night, resigning as party leader, with Bob Rae serving as interim leader until 2013.

=== Justin Trudeau era ===
Results of the 2015 Canadian federal election showing support for Liberal candidates by riding

Justin Trudeau, the son of former prime minister Pierre Trudeau, was elected as party leader in 2013. A supporter of Senate reform, Trudeau expelled all Senate Liberals from the party's parliamentary caucus, forcing them to eventually become Independents. Initially behind the NDP in opinion polling, the Liberal party won a majority government in 2015, defeating the incumbent Conservatives while gaining 150 seats in the House. They won consecutive minorities in 2019 and 2021. In the 44th Canadian Parliament, the party signed a confidence and supply agreement with the NDP, which was terminated 2 years after its signing.

Following a steady decline in public support, the sudden resignation of his deputy Chrystia Freeland in December 2024 and an ensuing political crisis, Trudeau announced in January 2025 that he would resign as prime minister and leader of the Liberal Party. He advised the Governor General to prorogue Parliament until March 24, while the party held a leadership election. He formally resigned on March 14.

=== Carney succeeds Justin Trudeau ===
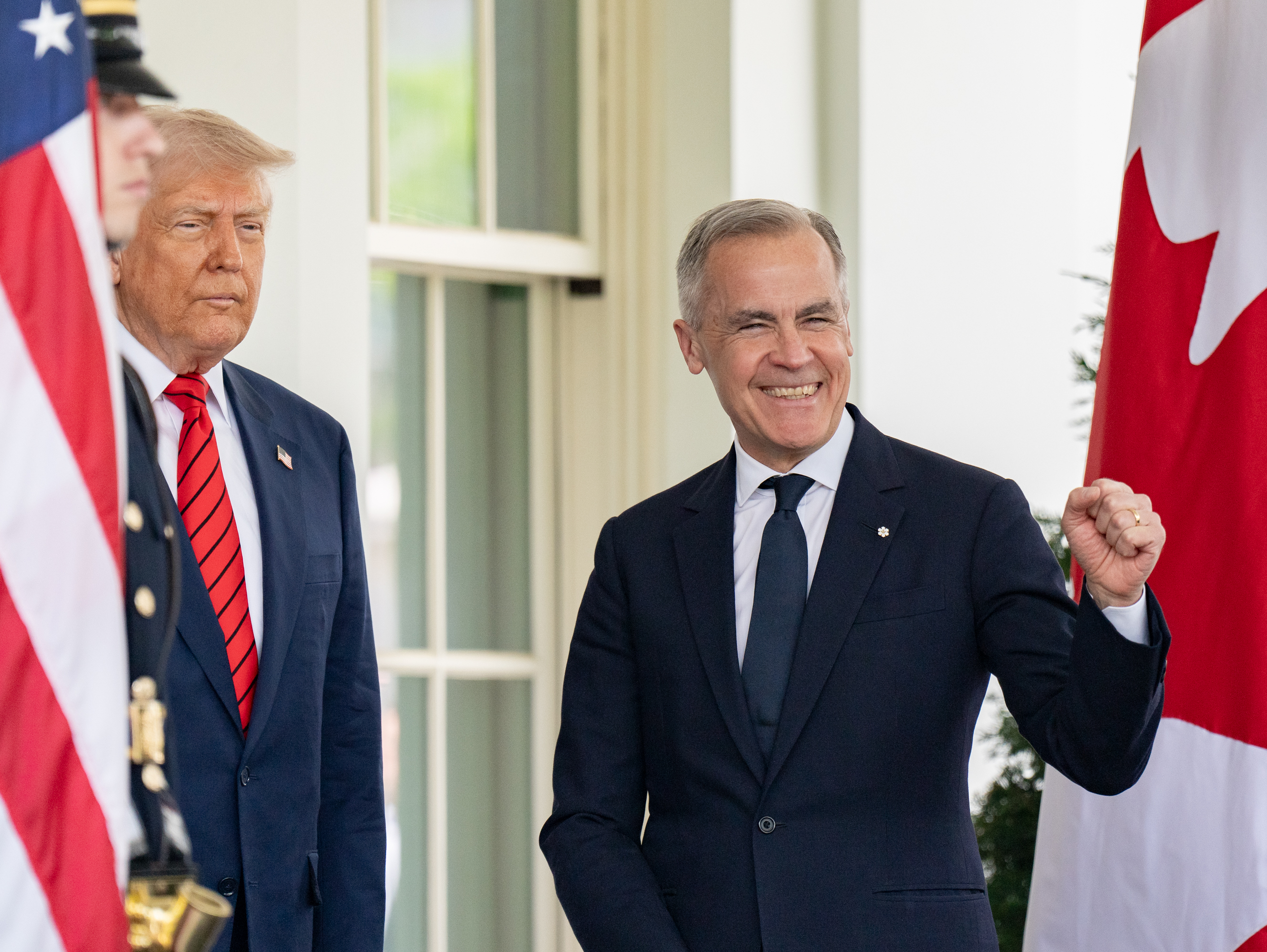
Carney meets with American President Donald Trump on May 6, 2025

Former Bank of Canada governor Mark Carney was elected as his replacement on March 9. His election as party leader and prime minister in March 2025 helped return the party to electoral popularity and government in the April 2025 federal election, forming a third minority government in 6 years. The party reported that 2025 was its best-ever fundraising year. Between late 2025 and early 2026, several opposition MPs crossed the floor to the Liberal caucus, helping push the government to majority status.

== Leaders of the Liberal Party since 1867 ==
Start of Leadership	Leader	Date of birth	Date of death	Length of Leadership
1 July 1867	George Brown	29 November 1818	10 May 1880	2 months, 19 days (interim)^{1}
20 September 1867	Vacant	n/a	n/a	2 years (approx)
1869	Edward Blake	13 October 1833	1 March 1912	2 years (approx) (interim)
1871	Vacant	n/a	n/a	2 years (approx)
6 March 1873	Alexander Mackenzie	28 January 1822	17 April 1892	7 years, 1 month
27 April 1880	Edward Blake	13 October 1833	1 March 1912	7 years, 1 month
23 June 1887	Sir Wilfrid Laurier	20 November 1841	17 February 1919	31 years, 8 months
17 February 1919	Daniel Duncan McKenzie	8 January 1859	8 June 1927	5 months, 3 weeks (interim)
7 August 1919	William Lyon Mackenzie King	17 December 1874	22 July 1950	29 years
7 August 1948	Louis St. Laurent	1 February 1882	25 July 1973	9 years, 5 months
16 January 1958	Lester B. Pearson	23 April 1897	28 December 1972	10 years, 3 months
6 April 1968	Pierre Elliott Trudeau	18 October 1919	28 September 2000	16 years, 2 months
16 June 1984	John Turner	7 June 1929	18 September 2020	6 years
6 February 1990	Herb Gray	25 May 1931	12 April 2014	4 months, 17 days^{2} (interim Parliamentary leader)
23 June 1990	Jean Chrétien	11 January 1934	Living	13 years, 5 months
14 November 2003	Paul Martin	28 August 1938	Living	2 years, 3 months
18 March 2006	Bill Graham	17 March 1939	7 August 2022	8 months, 2 weeks^{3} (interim)
2 December 2006	Stéphane Dion	28 September 1955	Living	2 years
10 December 2008	Michael Ignatieff	12 May 1947	Living	2 years, 5 months, 15 days
25 May 2011	Bob Rae	2 August 1948	Living	1 year, 10 months, 20 days (interim)
14 April 2013	Justin Trudeau	25 December 1971	Living	11 years, 10 months, 23 days
9 March 2025	Mark Carney	16 March 1965	Living	Current leader: 1 year, 153 days

Notes:

^{1} Brown was regarded by most Liberal candidates as their leader in the 1867 election but did not officially hold the title. He failed in his bid for a seat in the House of Commons and the Liberals had no official leader until 1873.

^{2} Herb Gray served as Leader of the Opposition from February 6 until Chrétien was re-elected to Parliament, and took his seat on December 21, 1990. He led the Liberal Party in parliament, though he was never the leader or interim leader of the Liberal Party as a whole.

^{3} After the defeat of the Liberals by the Conservatives of Stephen Harper in the 2006 Canadian federal election, held on January 26, Paul Martin announced in the early hours of January 27, 2006 his intention to resign the leadership of the Liberal Party. Bill Graham was later selected as parliamentary leader by caucus, while Martin indicated he would remain nominal party leader. On March 18, 2006, Graham was appointed interim leader after Martin officially stepped down from the post.

The Liberal Party held its first leadership convention in 1919, electing William Lyon Mackenzie King as leader. Prior to that party leaders were chosen by caucus.

== Party Presidents ==
Prior to the 1930s, the Liberal Party was a loose and informal association of national, provincial, and regional entities without a permanent central organization. Laurier attempted to formalize a party structure through three bodies, all of which was essentially taken over by regional caucuses. After King became leader those bodies created by Laurier were rendered mostly irrelevant by powerful ministers.

The party was ousted from government in 1930 in no small part due to the Beauharnois scandal, highlighting the need to keep the caucus away from fundraising and campaign management. The National Liberal Federation was formed in 1932 with Vincent Massey as its first president. However, once returned to government, Massey was appointed High Commissioner in London (which was not his preferred reward for managing the successful 1935 campaign) and the party organization was again eclipsed by caucus and powerful minister.

Presidency		Name	Biographical note (at time of election unless stated otherwise)
Start	End	Name	Biographical note (at time of election unless stated otherwise)
1932	1935	Vincent Massey	Briefly minister without portfolio in King's first (of three) ministry prior, managed the 1935 Liberal campaign, later High Commissioner to London (1935–46) and Governor General (1952–59)
1935	1941	Norman Platt Lambert	Party's general secretary and chief organizer from 1932, appointed senator (1938-65) while president
1941	1943	(vacant)	Presidency inactive
1943	1943	Norman Alexander McLarty	Acting president, MP (1935–45) and cabinet minister in the third King ministry (1939–45)
1943	1945	Wishart McLea Robertson	Former Nova Scota MLA (1928–33), appointed senator (1943–65) while president, later Government Leader in Senate (1945–53) and Senate Speaker (1953–57)
1945	1952	Gordon Fogo	Previously president of the Nova Scotia Liberal Association (1939–41), elected during King's leadership and continued presidency upon election St. Laurent as party leader, appointed senator (1949–52) by St Laurent while president
1952	1958	Duncan Kenneth MacTavish	King's campaign strategist since 1920s, later appointed senator (1963) but killed in a traffic accident shortly after
1958	1961	Bruce Matthews	Major general in the Royal Canadian Artillery during World War II, businessman
1961	1964	John Connolly	Ministerial aide during World War II, senator (1953–81), led party (federation) office from 1958, later Government Leader in Senate (1964–68)
1964	1968-04-06	John Lang Nichol	Appointed senator (1966–73) while president
1968-04-06 (Note: At leadership convention)	1973	Richard Stanbury	Previously president of the Toronto and York Liberal Association and chair of the party's policy committee, appointed senator briefly before being elected president
1973	1976	Gildas Molgat	Senator (1970-2001) and former leader of the Manitoba Liberal Party (1961–69)
1976	1980	Alasdair Graham	Senator (1972-2004), later Government Leader in Senate (1997–99)
1980	1982	Norman MacLeod	President of the Ontario wing of the party; won the presidency by two votes over former cabinet minister Martin O'Connell and lost re-election bid to Iona Campagnolo, another former minister
1982	1986	Iona Campagnolo	Former MP (1974–79) and cabinet minister in the first Trudeau Sr ministry (1976–79), later Lieutenant Governor of British Columbia (2001–07); First female party president, the second party presidency that continued under a new leader
1986	1990	J. J. Michel Robert	Former president of the young liberals (1963–65), later Chief Justice of Quebec (2002–11)
1990-06-23	1994-05-15	Don Johnston	Former MP (1978–88) and cabinet minister in the 2nd Trudeau Sr ministry, 3rd place candidate in the 1984 leadership contest
1994-05-15	1998-03-20	Dan Hays	Senator (1984-2007) and later Senate Speaker (2001–06)
1998-03-20	2003-11-14	Stephen LeDrew	Won presidency in a contest against former MP Bonnie Hickey, re-elected unopposed in 2000
2003-11-14	2006-12-03	Michael Eizenga	Party secretary-treasurer (2002–03), president of the Ontario Liberal Party (1995–97), re-elected unopposed in March 2005
2006-12-03	2008-04-29	Marie Poulin	Senator (1995-2015), won presidency in a contest against former MP Tony Ianno and Manitoba party president Bobbi Either, resigned between conventions after a stroke
2008-04-29	2009-05-02	Doug Ferguson	Son of former cabinet minister Ralph Ferguson, later electoral candidate in the 2011 election Party's vice president at Poulin's resignation, elected by the national board to serve until the next convention
2009-05-02	2012-01-14	Alfred Apps	Prominent party activist, party's electoral candidate in Oxford in 1984 and 1988, elected unopposed
2012-01-14	2014-02-22	Mike Crawley	President of the party's Ontario wing, secured presidency in a contest against former Deputy Prime Minister Sheila Copps and MP Alexandra Mendes
2014-02-22	2018-04-21	Anna Gainey	Local riding president since 2011, former ministerial aide, key advisor to the leadership bid of Justin Trudeau, re-elected unopposed 2016; Later MP (since 2023) and Secretary of State in the Carney ministry (since 2025)
2018-04-21	2023-05-06	Suzanne Cowan	Party's vice president (2016–18), daughter of Senator Jim Cowan, former ministerial aide, key advisor to the leadership bid of Justin Trudeau; Elected unopposed and re-elected unopposed in 2021.
2023-05-06	incumbent	Sachit Mehra	Chair of the party's agency corporation, former president of the party's Manitoba wing

== Election results ==
Election	# of candidates nominated	# of seats won	# of total votes	% of popular vote	result
1867	65	62	60,818	22.67%	Cons. majority
1872	111	95	110,556	34.72%	Cons. majority
1874	140	129	128,059	39.49%	majority government
1878	121	63	180,074	33.05%	Cons. majority
1882	112	72	160,547	31.10%	Cons. majority
1887	184	79	312,736	43.13%	Cons. majority
1891	194	90	350,512	45.22%	Cons. majority
1896	190	117	401,425	41.37%	majority government
1900	209	128	477,758	50.25%	majority government
1904	208	137	521,041	50.88%	majority government
1908	213	133	570,311	48.87%	majority government
1911	214	85	596,871	45.82%	Cons. majority
1917*	213	82	729,756	38.80%	coalition government
1921	204	118	1,285,998	41.15%	majority government
1925	216	100	1,252,684	39.74%	minority government
1926	189	114	1,294,072	42.74%	majority government
1930	226	90	1,716,798	44.03%	Cons. majority
1935	245	173	1,967,839	44.68%	majority government
1940	242	179	2,365,979	51.32%	majority government
1945	236	117	2,086,545	39.78%	majority government
1949	259	190	2,878,097	49.15%	majority government
1953	263	169	2,743,013	48.62%	majority government
1957	265	105	2,703,687	40.91%	PC minority
1958	265	49	2,444,909	33.50%	PC majority
1962	264	100	2,862,001	37.17%	PC minority
1963	265	128	3,276,995	41.52%	minority government
1965	265	131	3,099,521	40.18%	minority government
1968	263	155	3,686,801	47.53%	majority government
1972	263	109	3,717,804	38.42%	minority government
1974	264	141	4,102,853	43.15%	majority government
1979	282	114	4,595,319	40.11%	PC minority
1980	282	147	4,855,425	44.40%	majority government
1984	282	40	3,516,486	28.02%	PC majority
1988	294	83	4,205,072	31.92%	PC majority
1993	295	177	5,598,775	41.24%	majority government
1997	301	155	4,994,377	38.46%	majority government
2000	301	172	5,251,961	40.85%	majority government
2004	308	135	4,951,107	36.7%	minority government
2006	308	103	4,477,217	30.09%	Cons. minority
2008	308	76	3,629,990	26.24%	Cons. minority
2011	308	34	2,783,175	18.91%	Cons. majority
2015	338	184	6,930,136	39.47%	majority government
2019	338	157	6,018,728	33.12%	minority government
2021	338	160	5,556,629	32.62%	minority government
2025	343	169	8,566,674	43.70%	minority government

- 1953-1968 includes one Liberal-Labour Member of Parliament.

* In 1917, some Liberals ran under the Unionist banner, figures only count those who ran as "Laurier Liberals"
