= Leader of the Liberal Party =

Leader of the Liberal Party may refer to

- Leader of the Liberal Party of Australia
- Leader of the Liberal Party of Canada
- Leader of the Liberal Party (UK)
