= Joyce Fairbairn =

Canadian politician (1939–2022)

The Honourable Joyce Fairbairn PC CM

Leader of the Government in the Senate
- In office November 4, 1993 – June 10, 1997
- Prime Minister: Jean Chrétien
- Deputy: Gildas Molgat; Alasdair Graham
- Whip: Jacques Hébert
- Preceded by: Lowell Murray
- Succeeded by: Alasdair Graham

Minister with special responsibility for Literacy
- In office November 4, 1993 – June 10, 1997
- Prime Minister: Jean Chrétien
- Preceded by: Position established
- Succeeded by: Position abolished

Canadian Senator from Alberta
- In office June 29, 1984 – January 18, 2013
- Nominated by: Pierre Trudeau
- Appointed by: Jeanne Sauvé
- Preceded by: Harry Hays (1982)
- Succeeded by: Doug Black

Personal details
- Born: November 6, 1939 Lethbridge, Alberta, Canada
- Died: March 29, 2022 (aged 82) Lethbridge, Alberta, Canada
- Party: Liberal
- Spouse: Michael Gillan (m. 1967; died 2002)
- Education: University of Alberta; Carleton University
- Profession: Politician; journalist

Joyce Fairbairn PC CM (November 6, 1939 – March 29, 2022) was a politician and journalist. She was a member of the Senate of Canada, and was the first woman to serve as the leader of the Government in the Senate.

== Early life and education ==
Born in Lethbridge, Alberta on November 6, 1939, Fairbairn was the daughter of Mary Elizabeth (née Young) and Lynden Eldon Fairbairn, a judge of the District Court of Alberta, lawyer, and Liberal candidate for the 1935 and 1940 federal elections in Lethbridge. She was a teenage journalist when she was a student at Lethbridge Collegiate Institute, and wrote a column entitled "Teen Chatter" in the Lethbridge Herald. She attended the University of Alberta where she earned a bachelor's degree in English and Carleton University where she earned a degree in journalism. She married Michael Charles Frederick Gillan in 1967; he died in 2002.

== Political life ==
Fairbairn worked as a journalist in the Parliamentary Press Gallery in Ottawa before being hired as a legislative assistant to Prime Minister Pierre Trudeau in 1970. In 1981, she became Communications Coordinator in the Prime Minister's Office. On June 29, 1984, just prior to leaving office, Trudeau recommended her for appointment as a Liberal senator for Alberta, her home province. Over the years as a senator, she held a number of positions within the Liberal Party, including Vice-Chair of the National as well as the Western and Northern Liberal Caucus from 1984 to 1991, and Co-Chair of the National Campaign Committee for her party in 1991.

When the Liberals returned to power after the 1993 election, Prime Minister Jean Chrétien appointed Fairbairn to the cabinet as Government Leader in the Senate, the first female senator in the post, and Minister with Special Responsibility for Literacy. She served in cabinet until 1997, after which she took on the role as Special Advisor on Literacy to the Minister of Human Resources and Skills Development. She also chaired the Standing Senate Committee on Agriculture and Forestry, and the Special Senate Committee on the Anti-terrorism Act. She sat on the Senate Committee on Agriculture and Forestry until June 2012.

Fairbairn became involved with the Paralympics movement in Canada as early as 1998. That year, to counter a funding shortfall, she spearheaded fundraising efforts to send a Canadian team to compete in the 2000 Paralympic Games in Sydney, Australia, through "Friends of the Paralympics", a group that grew and became "a strong political and fundraising voice for the Canadian Paralympic Movement". By 2000, she co-founded and chaired the Canadian Paralympic Foundation, the first official charitable foundation connected to the Canadian Paralympic Committee, to secure long-term financial support for Paralympic athletes and the committee. In recognition of her role in promoting and supporting Paralympic sports across the country, she was inducted to the Canadian Paralympic Hall of Fame as a builder in 2011.

In August 2012, Fairbairn took indefinite sick leave from the Senate due to the onset of Alzheimer's disease. It was subsequently reported that Fairbairn had been declared legally incompetent in February but had continued voting in the Senate until June. The Fairbairn case led to calls for the Senate to establish rules to address similar situations should they arise. On November 30, 2012, she tendered her resignation to the Governor General with effect from January 18, 2013.

== Later life ==
On March 11, 2018, it was announced that the new middle school in Lethbridge, Alberta would be named after Fairbairn. It was named Senator Joyce Fairbairn Middle School, and opened in the fall of 2018.

Joyce Fairbairn died in Lethbridge on March 29, 2022, at the age of 82.

== Honours ==
=== Commonwealth honours ===
Country	Date	Appointment	Post-nominal letters
Canada	November 4, 1993 – March 29, 2022	Member of the Queen's Privy Council for Canada	PC
Canada	August 12, 2015 – March 29, 2022	Member of the Order of Canada	CM
Canada	1992	125th Anniversary of the Confederation of Canada Medal	
Canada	2002	Queen Elizabeth II Golden Jubilee Medal (Canadian Version)	
Canada	2012	Queen Elizabeth II Diamond Jubilee Medal (Canadian Version)	

=== Scholastic ===
Honorary Degrees

Location	Date	School	Degree	Gave Commencement Address
Alberta	Spring 2004	University of Lethbridge	Doctor of Laws (LL.D)	Yes

26th Canadian Ministry (1993–2003) – Cabinet of Jean Chrétien
Cabinet post (1)
Predecessor	Office	Successor
Lowell Murray	Leader of the Government in the Senate; 1993–1997	Alasdair Graham
