= 1948 Liberal Party of Canada leadership election =

Party election in Canada

← 1919	August 7, 1948	1958 →
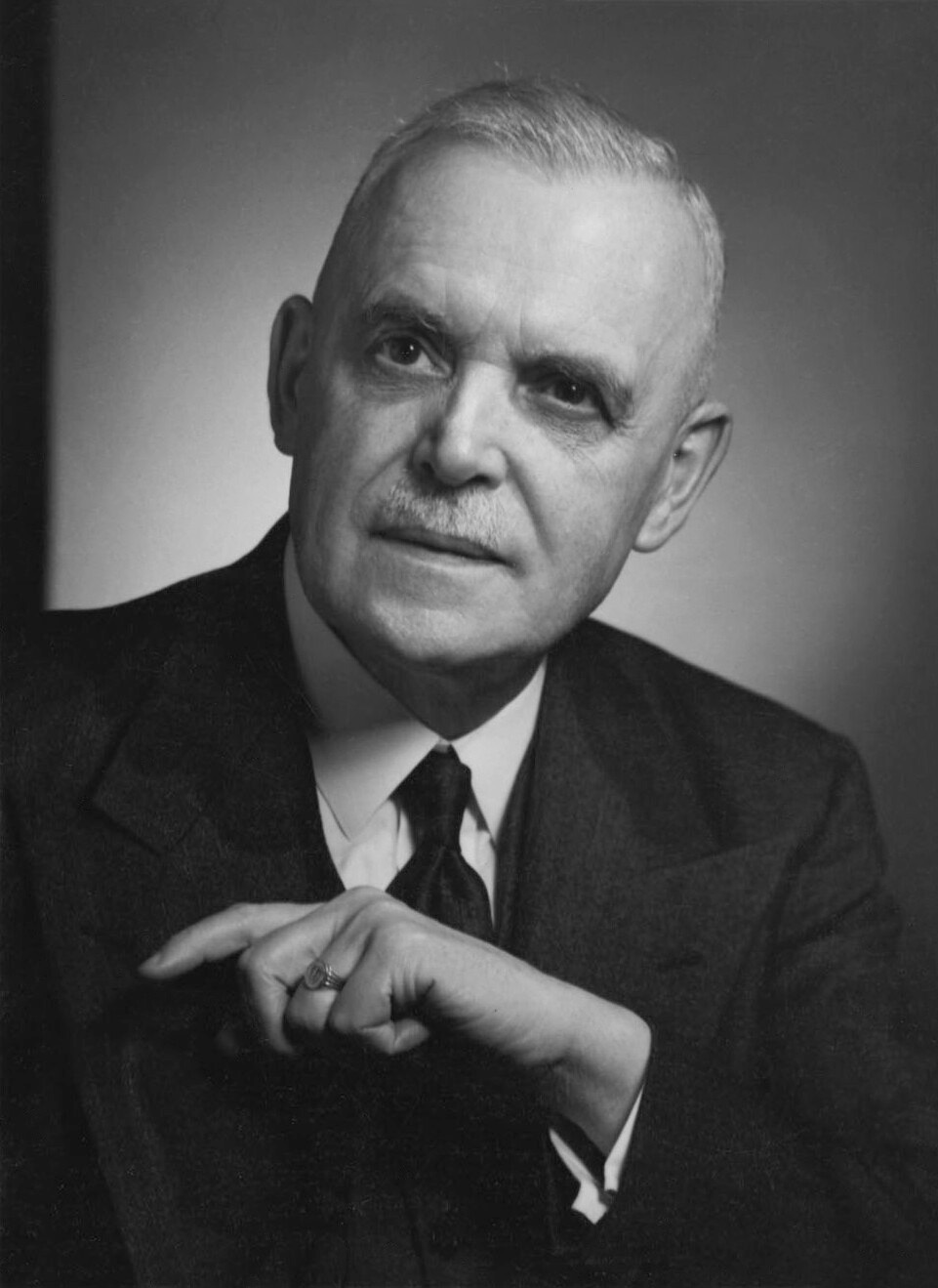

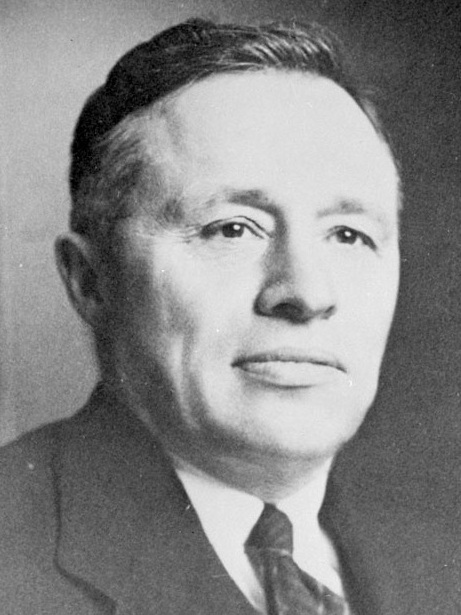
Candidate	Louis St. Laurent	James Garfield Gardiner
Delegate count	848	323
Percentage	69.1%	26.3%
Leader before election
William Lyon Mackenzie King
Elected Leader
Louis St. Laurent

1948 Liberal leadership election
- Date: August 7, 1948
- Convention: Ottawa Coliseum, Lansdowne Park, Ottawa, Ontario
- Resigning leader: William Lyon Mackenzie King
- Won by: Louis St. Laurent
- Ballots: 1
- Candidates: 3

In 1948, the Liberal Party of Canada held a leadership election to replace retiring Liberal leader and sitting Prime Minister William Lyon Mackenzie King. Secretary of State for External Affairs Louis St. Laurent defeated Minister of Agriculture (and former Premier of Saskatchewan) James Garfield Gardiner and former cabinet minister Charles Gavan Power on the first ballot, and would be sworn in as prime minister later that year.

The convention was held exactly 29 years after the 1919 leadership convention that saw King elected Liberal leader. The National Film Board of Canada made a short film about the event for its Eye Witness series.

== Candidates ==
=== James Garfield Gardiner ===
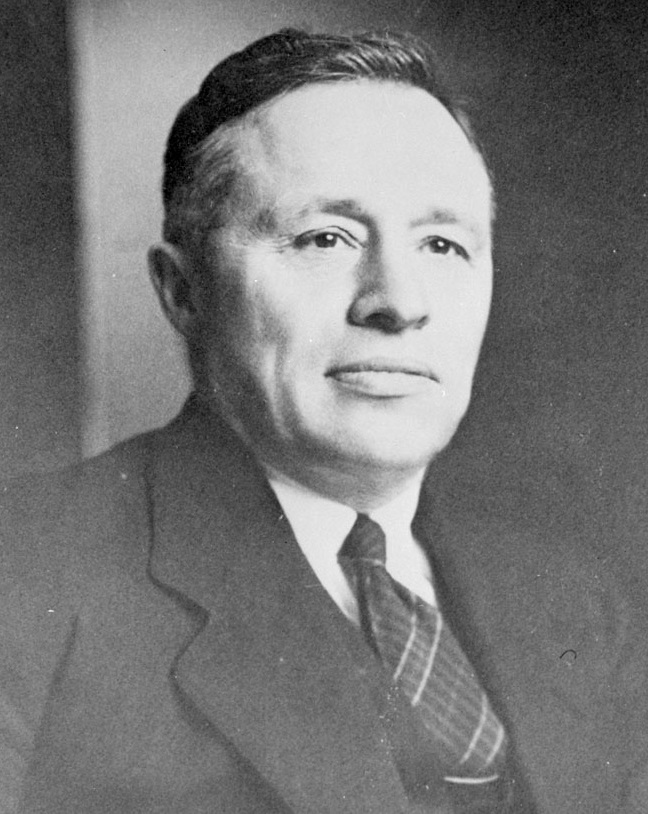
James Garfield Gardiner

Background
Premier of Saskatchewan (1926–1929, 1934–1935)
MP for Melville, Saskatchewan (1940–1958)
MP for Assiniboia, Saskatchewan (1936–1940)
Minister of Agriculture (1935–1957)

James Garfield Gardiner, 64, called for increased immigration and closer ties to the United Kingdom. His support was strongest in Alberta, British Columbia, and his home province of Saskatchewan, and he was seen as St. Laurent's primary competition. His convention speech, which went over the allotted 20 minutes, asked for a chance to be the party's "spark plug." King campaigned hard against Gardiner, calling his campaign "ruthless and selfish," and criticized his tactics.

=== Charles Gavan Power ===
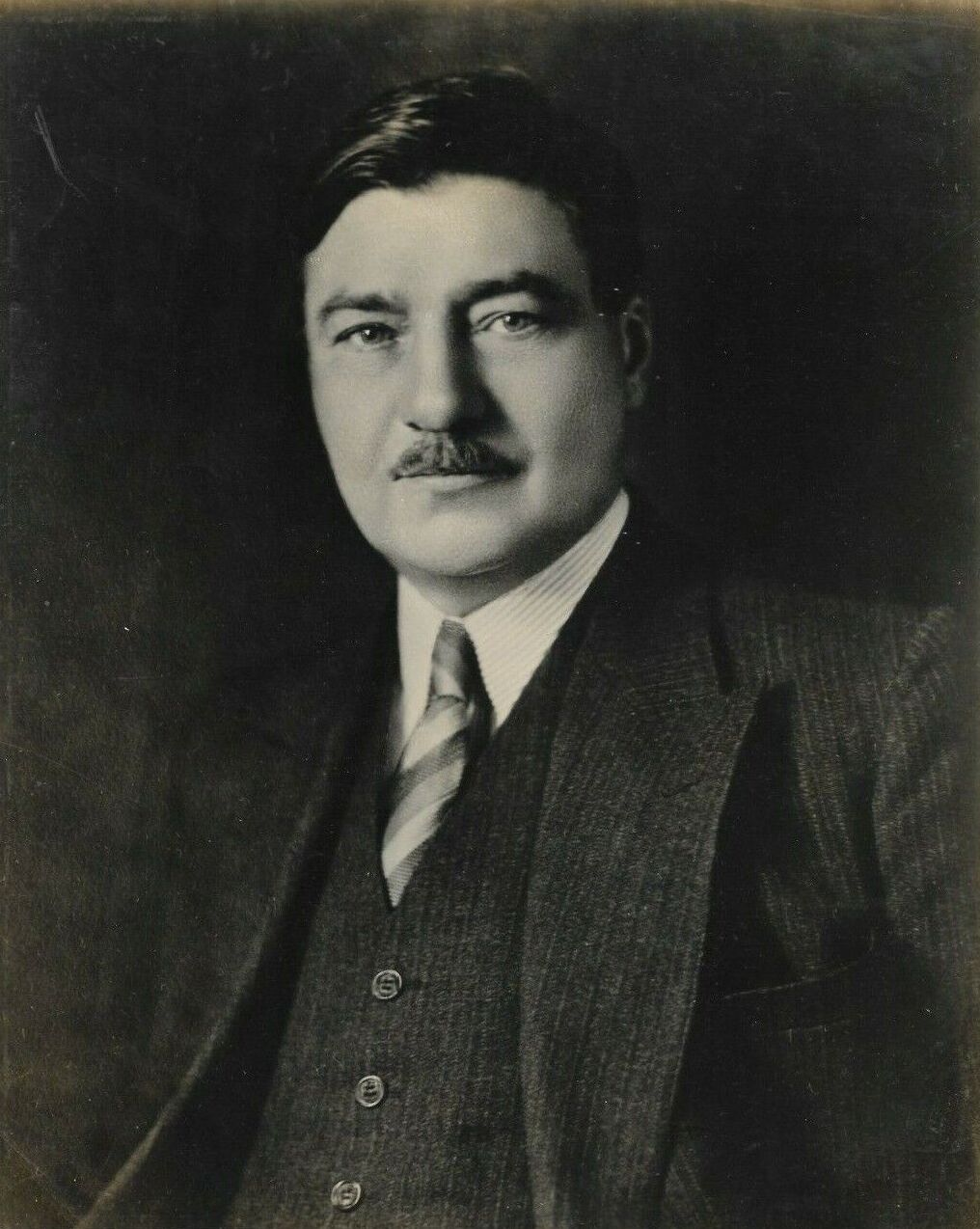
Charles Gavan Power

Background
MP for Quebec South, Quebec (1917–1955)
Senator for Gulf, Quebec (1955–1968)
Minister of Pensions and National Health (1935–1939)
Postmaster General (1939–1940)
Minister of National Defence for Air (1940–1944)
Associate Minister of National Defence (1940–1944)

Charles Gavan Power, 60, had resigned from cabinet during World War II amidst the Conscription Crisis of 1944 due to his opposition to conscription. Power left the Liberals to sit as an "Independent Liberal," and was elected as such during the 1945 election. Following the war, Power rejoined the Liberals. His convention speech called for electoral reform (including placing limits on campaign spending), and called on the party to return to its policy of protecting individual rights.

=== Louis St. Laurent ===
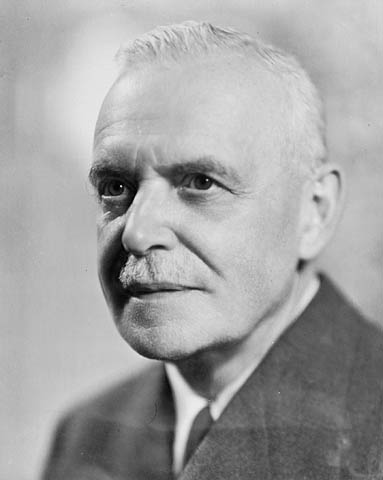
Louis St. Laurent

Background
MP for Quebec East, Quebec (1942–1958)
Minister of Justice and Attorney General (1941–1946, 1948)
Secretary of State for External Affairs (1946–1948)

Louis St. Laurent, 66, was King's personal choice, and King campaigned hard for St. Laurent to win. King lobbied hard behind the scenes, reversing his earlier pledge not to vote on the first ballot and convincing various other cabinet ministers (as seen below) to enter the race and withdraw in favour of St. Laurent. St. Laurent's support was seen as strong throughout the country, especially Ontario and Quebec. St. Laurent's convention speech told delegates that his government would fight to prevent the spread of communism abroad, and that the Liberals were the only party capable of bridging the gap between English Canada and French Canada, and respect provincial rights.

=== Withdrawn candidates ===
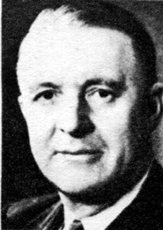
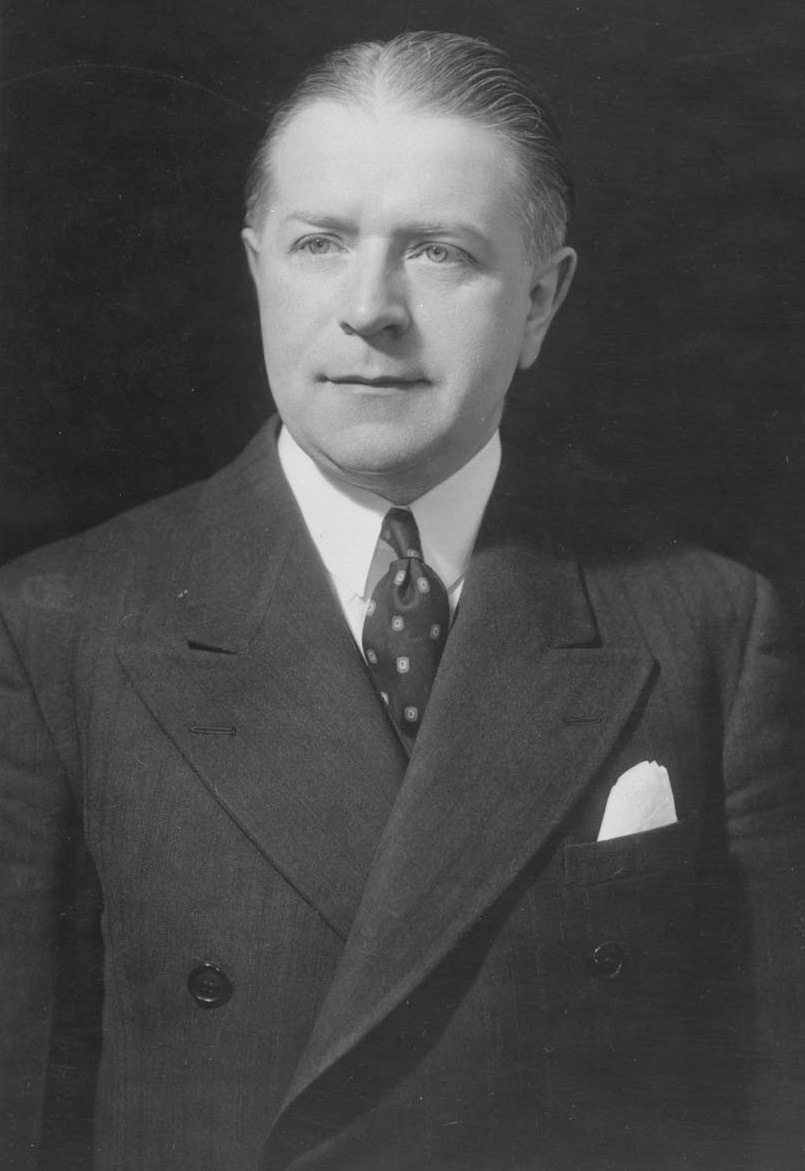
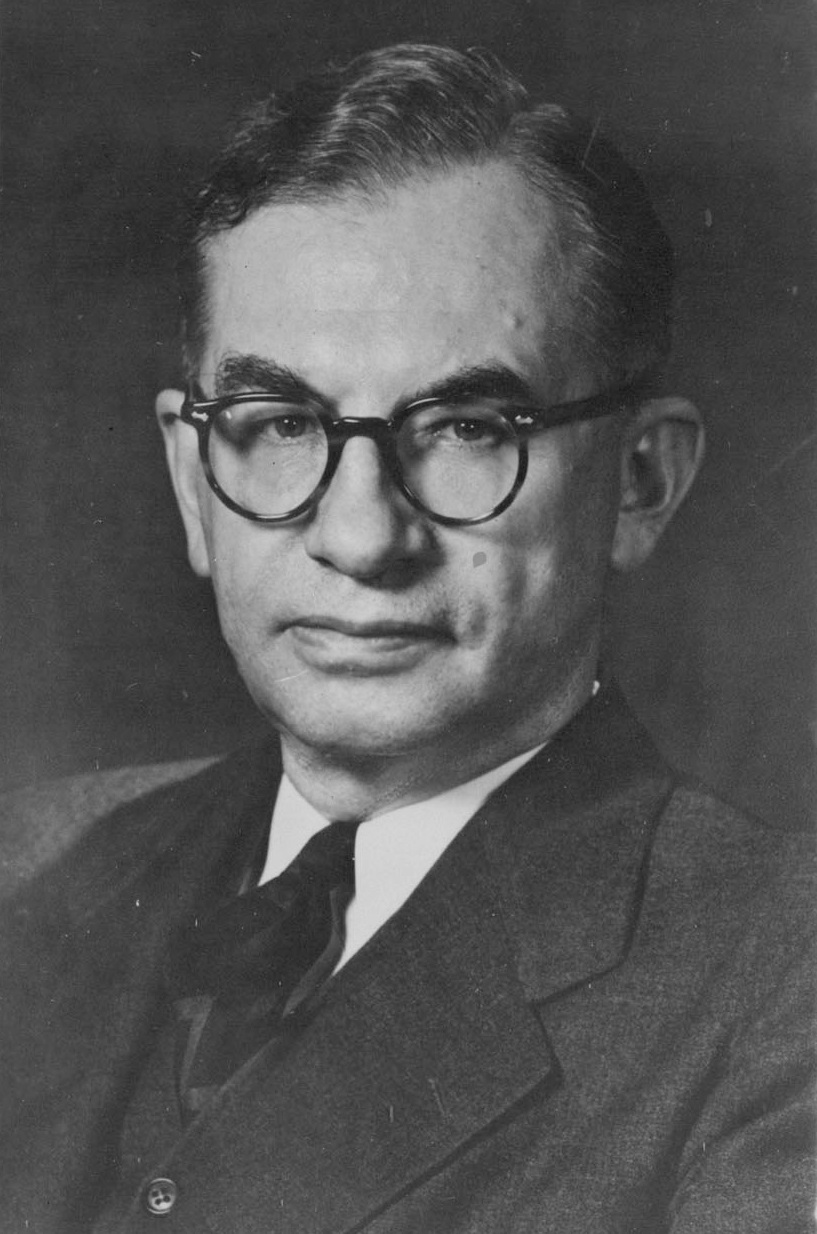
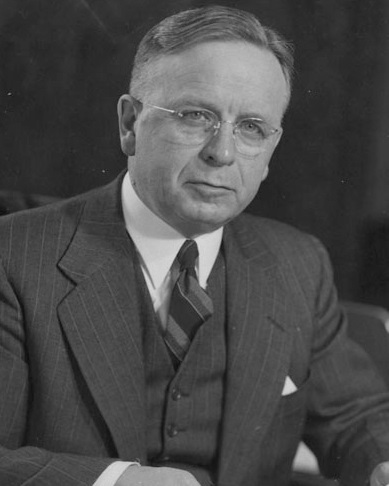
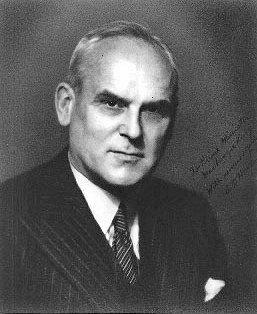
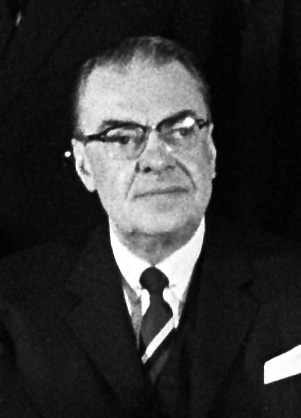
From left to right: Abbott, Chevrier, Claxton, Garson, Howe, and Martin.

King, in his behind the scenes attempt to swing the convention in favour of St. Laurent, convinced the following candidates to run for the leadership but withdraw at the convention to support St. Laurent:

- Douglas Abbott, MP for Saint-Antoine—Westmount and Minister of Finance
- Lionel Chevrier, MP for Stormont and Minister of Transport
- Brooke Claxton, MP for St. Lawrence—St. George and Minister of National Defence
- Stuart Garson, MLA for Fairford and Premier of Manitoba
- C. D. Howe, MP for Port Arthur and Minister of Trade and Commerce
- Paul Martin Sr., MP for Essex East and Minister of National Health and Welfare

There was an attempt to draft Premier of Nova Scotia Angus Lewis Macdonald after he gave a rousing speech to the convention but he announced that he would not stand.

== Results ==
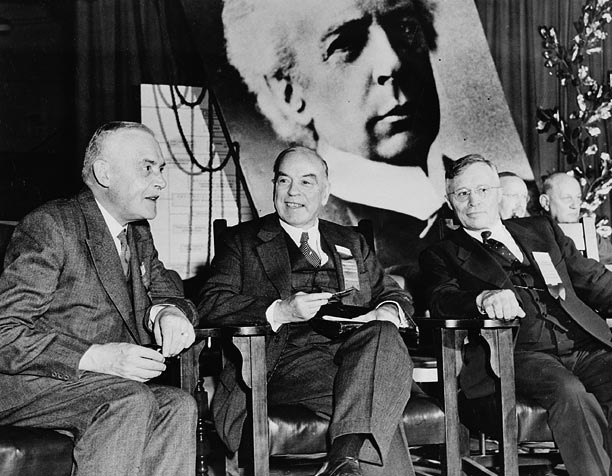
Louis St. Laurent, William Lyon Mackenzie King, and James Garfield Gardiner at the convention.

First Ballot
Candidate	Delegate Support	Percentage
Louis St. Laurent	848	69.1%
James Garfield Gardiner	323	26.3%
Charles Gavan Power	56	4.6%
Total	1,227	100%

First ballot
St. Laurent	69.11%
Gardiner	26.32%
Power	4.56%
