= Gordon Fogo =

Canadian politician

The Honourable James Gordon Fogo QC

Canadian Senator from Ontario
- In office 1949–1952
- Appointed by: Louis St. Laurent

Personal details
- Born: July 9, 1896 Halifax, Nova Scotia, Canada
- Died: July 6, 1952 (aged 55) La Malbaie, Quebec, Canada
- Party: Liberal

James Gordon Fogo, QC (July 9, 1896 – July 6, 1952) was a Canadian lawyer and senator.

== Background ==
Born in Halifax, Nova Scotia, the son of Adam Fogo and Alice Hanway, he studied law at Dalhousie University and served as an officer in the Canadian Army (2nd Canadian Siege Battery, Canadian Expeditionary Force) in World War I. Returning from the war in 1919, he served briefly as principal of the high school in Sydney, Nova Scotia. He entered Dalhousie University's School of Law in 1921. Fogo was called to the Nova Scotia bar in 1924 and practised law in Halifax as a member of the Burchell & Ralston law firm. He became a partner in the firm (renamed Burchell, Smith, Parker and Fogo) in 1926, and was appointed King's Counsel in 1938. He remained with that firm until 1946. He married Helen Louise Fisher in 1927. In 1942 he moved to Ottawa to serve as Associate Coordinator of Controls in the wartime Munitions Department. There he became, in the words of the Ottawa Journal, "one of the Government's ace trouble-shooters on the production side of the war effort." He also served on the War Contracts Depreciation Board, the government's Economic Advisory Committee, and as Vice President of the Maritime Board of Trade. He was a member of the board of directors of Wartime Shipbuilding Ltd., and also vice-president and director for Algoma Steel. While making a name for himself in corporate law, he was also active in the Liberal Party. He was President of the Nova Scotia Liberal Association from 1939 to 1941 where he became a protégé of William Lyon Mackenzie King. He served as president of the National Liberal Federation from 1945 until 1952 and was appointed co-chairman of the Third National Convention of the Liberal Party in 1948 at which Louis St. Laurent was elected Liberal Party leader succeeding Mackenzie King. Reporting his appointment, Time magazine characterized him as "a reliable worker behind the scenes, whose political gift is to stop bootless quarreling and secure quiet settlements". Fogo was appointed to the Senate of Canada in 1949, and represented the senatorial division of Carleton, Ontario. Impressed by his relative youth and energy, a contemporary newspaper editorialized, "what the Senate needs is fewer old fogeys and more young Fogos!" Nevertheless, he died in La Malbaie, Quebec just three years later, in 1952. As the Ottawa Journal mused, "a long and brilliant future seemed to stretch before him, making more the pity of his going while at the zenith of his powers." Fogo was an enthusiastic curler, an avid yachtsman, and a member of the Halifax Club, the Rideau Club and the York Club. He was survived by his wife and two children. His legacy is perpetuated by two awards at Dalhousie University, the J. Gordon Fogo Prize for Excellence in Commercial Law, and the J. Gordon Fogo Bursary, a need-based scholarship.

Party political offices
Preceded by Wishart McLea Robertson	President of the Liberal Party of Canada; 1946–1952	Succeeded by Duncan Kenneth MacTavish
