= Alasdair Graham =

Canadian politician, journalist and businessman

The Honourable Alasdair Graham PC

Leader of the Government in the Senate
- In office June 11, 1997 – October 3, 1999
- Prime Minister: Jean Chrétien
- Deputy: Sharon Carstairs
- Whip: Jacques Hébert; Léonce Mercier
- Preceded by: Joyce Fairbairn
- Succeeded by: Bernie Boudreau

Canadian Senator from The Highlands
- In office April 27, 1972 – May 21, 2004
- Nominated by: Pierre Trudeau
- Appointed by: Roland Michener
- Preceded by: Multi-member district
- Succeeded by: Jim Cowan (2005)

Personal details
- Born: Alasdair Bernard Graham; May 21, 1929 Dominion, Nova Scotia, Canada
- Died: April 22, 2015 (aged 85) Halifax, Nova Scotia, Canada
- Party: Liberal
- Education: Saint Francis Xavier University
- Occupation: Politician
- Profession: Journalist, businessman

Alasdair Bernard Graham PC (May 21, 1929 – April 22, 2015) was a Canadian politician, journalist and businessman.

== Political career ==
Graham attempted to win a seat in the House of Commons of Canada in the 1958 election from Nova Scotia, but was defeated in the attempt. On April 27, 1972, he was appointed to the Senate of Canada by Pierre Trudeau. Graham served as president of the Liberal Party of Canada from 1976 until 1980. In 1995, he became deputy government leader in the Senate, and was promoted to Leader of the Government in the Senate in 1997, joining the Cabinet as Nova Scotia's sole representative. The Liberals had lost all of its seats in the province in the 1997 election. He served in Cabinet until 1999 when Chrétien replaced him with Bernie Boudreau.

== Retirement ==
Graham retired from the Senate in 2004 upon reaching the mandatory retirement age of 75. His son, Danny Graham, served as leader of the Nova Scotia Liberal Party from 2002 to 2004. Graham died on April 22, 2015.

== Archives ==
There is a Alasdair B. Graham fonds at Library and Archives Canada.

26th Canadian Ministry (1993–2003) – Cabinet of Jean Chrétien
Cabinet post (1)
| Predecessor | Office | Successor |
|---|---|---|
| Joyce Fairbairn | Leader of the Government in the Senate; 1997–2000 | Bernie Boudreau |
Party political offices
| Preceded by Gildas Molgat | President of the Liberal Party of Canada; 1976–1980 | Succeeded by Norman MacLeod |
