= Norman MacLeod (Canadian businessman) =

Canadian business executive (1927–2021)

Norman William MacLeod (8 September 1927 – 13 January 2021) was a Canadian business executive and politician who was active in the Liberal Party of Canada and served as its President from 1980 until 1982.

== Biography ==
Born in Brandon, Manitoba in September 1927, MacLeod graduated from the University of Manitoba. MacLeod moved to Vancouver where he was politically active and later moved to Toronto to pursue his career. In the business world MacLeod served as a vice-President of Household Finance.

In 1980, MacLeod was elected party president by a two-vote margin over former cabinet minister Martin O'Connell. As the party was experiencing financial difficulties during his tenure he turned down the honorarium of about $15,000 a year that the party traditionally offered its president. Prior to becoming party president, MacLeod served as Ontario campaign chair for the party during the 1980 federal election and served as president of the Ontario section of the federal Liberal Party.

He was challenged for the party presidency in 1982 by former cabinet minister Iona Campagnolo who defeated him in his bid for re-election. MacLeod suffered because of the poor financial state of the party, including difficulties with a weak fundraising record, and his reputation as a supporter of John Turner. MacLeod was not offered a seat in the Senate during or following his presidency. MacLeod was a founding member and a chair of the National Board of Directors at the Better Business Bureau of Canada. He sat on the Council of the Ontario College of Social Workers and Social Service Workers. He also served on the boards of the Ontario Hospital Association and The Psychology Foundation of Canada.

MacLeod died in January 2021 at the age of 93.

Party political offices
Preceded by Alasdair Graham	President of the Liberal Party of Canada; 1980–1982	Succeeded by Iona Campagnolo
