= Suzanne Cowan =

Canadian politician

President of the Liberal Party of Canada
- In office April 21, 2018 – May 6, 2023
- Leader: Justin Trudeau
- Preceded by: Anna Gainey
- Succeeded by: Sachit Mehra

Vice President (English) of the Liberal Party of Canada
- In office August 24, 2016 – April 21, 2018
- President: Anna Gainey
- Leader: Justin Trudeau

Personal details
- Born: Halifax, Nova Scotia, Canada
- Parent: Jim Cowan (father)
- Education: Mount Allison University; Université de Strasbourg

Suzanne Cowan is a Canadian political administrator who served as the president of the Liberal Party of Canada from 2018 to 2023.

== Career ==
Suzanne Cowan is a native of Halifax. Cowan's father is former Liberal senator Jim Cowan who was leader of the opposition Liberal caucus in the Senate from 2008 to 2016. Cowan received degrees from Mount Allison University and Université de Strasbourg in Strasbourg, France.

Cowan worked as an communications aide and advisor to liberal Deputy Prime Minister Herb Grey, minister Carolyn Bennett, Senate Government Leader Bernie Boudreau and Ontario Premier Dalton McGuinty. She was a key advisor to Justin Trudeau’s successful 2013 leadership bid, and served as a senior advisor to Trudeau as party leader from 2013 through the 2015 election. In 2014, whilst Cowan was senior advisor to Trudeau, Trudeau removed all Liberal Senators from the Liberal caucus, including her father who was at the time Leader of the Opposition in the Senate and leader of the Senate Liberal Caucus.

Cowan became national vice president of the Liberal Party of Canada at its 2016 convention held in Winnipeg, the first convention held since the party returned to power. At the Winnipeg convention, the freshly elected PM Trudeau implored delegates to adopt a revamped party constitution that drastically altered the party's governance and organization model. Cowan led the drafting of much of the new rules needed to operationally implement the revamped constitution following the convention. In 2018, she was elected unopposed as party president at its 2018 convention held in Halifax, and served until the party's 2023 convention in Ottawa. In the 2025 leadership contest that elected Mark Carney as leader, Cowan co-chaired the committee responsible for planning and organizing Leadership vote.

== Personal life ==
Cowan lives in Toronto. She has two daughters, Grace and Clara Cunningham.
