= Duncan Kenneth MacTavish =

Canadian politician

Canadian Senator from Ontario
- In office June 11, 1963 – November 15, 1963
- Nominated by: Lester B. Pearson
- Appointed by: Georges Vanier

President of the Liberal Party of Canada
- In office 1952–1958
- Leader: Louis St. Laurent
- Preceded by: James Gordon Fogo
- Succeeded by: Bruce Matthews

Personal details
- Born: August 3, 1899
- Died: November 15, 1963 (aged 64)
- Party: Liberal

Military service
- Allegiance: Canada
- Branch/service: Navy
- Rank: Captain
- Battles/wars: World War II

Duncan Kenneth MacTavish (August 3, 1899 – November 15, 1963) was a Canadian Senator.

== Background ==
MacTavish was a millionaire and one of Canada's leading corporate lawyers. He was a chief Liberal Party strategist and fundraiser and was an advisor to three Liberal Prime Ministers - William Lyon Mackenzie King, Louis St. Laurent and Lester Pearson and had also known Sir Wilfrid Laurier, a friend of his father, as a youth.

His father was Judge Duncan Byron MacTavish. He was educated in Ottawa and at Queen's University and Osgoode Hall Law School before being admitted to the bar in 1926. In 1940, he married Janet Southam, daughter of Ottawa Citizen publisher Harry Stevenson Southam and a member of the Southam family.

He began advising Mackenzie King during election campaigns in the 1920s and was named as executor of the late prime minister's estate.

He was president of the National Liberal Federation from 1952 to 1958 and had been a top Liberal campaign strategist for nearly 40 years at the time of his death. He was killed in an automobile collision on the Queen Elizabeth Way when returning home from the opening of the Royal Winter Fair in Toronto.

MacTavish was appointed to the Senate of Canada in June 1963 by Prime Minister Pearson and served in the Senate for five months until the fatal accident.

He was a senior partner in the Ottawa firm of Gowling, MacTavish, Osborne and Henderson and was an officer of 34 corporations as well as a member of the Board of Trustees of Queen's University.

During World War II he served as deputy Judge Advocate General of the Royal Canadian Navy with the rank of captain.

In the early 1950s he served as chairman of the Federal District Commission (the precursor of the National Capital Commission) which was responsible for creating what became the National Capital Region.
