= Wishart McLea Robertson =

Canadian politician (1891–1967)

Wishart McLea Robertson, PC (February 15, 1891 – August 16, 1967) was a politician in Nova Scotia, Canada.

Robertson's paternal grandfather, Robert Robertson, was a member of Nova Scotia House of Assembly from 1854 until 1878. His father, Thomas Robertson was also a member of the provincial legislature, as well as serving as a Liberal Member of Parliament (MP) from 1882 to 1887. His mother was Josephine Allan.

Born in Barrington Passage, Nova Scotia, Wishart Robertson was educated in a Nova Scotia high school. He moved to Brooklyn, United States, to enter business, but returned to Canada in 1916 to join the 219th Battalion and then the 85th Battalion of the Canadian Expeditionary Force as a lieutenant. In 1918, he returned to Canada following World War I, and entered the automobile industry. In 1919, Robertson married Ethel Walker. He eventually became president and manager of Argyle Motor Services Ltd. and of Robertson Motors Ltd. of Halifax, Nova Scotia.

In 1928, he was elected to the provincial legislature, representing the riding previously held by his father and grandfather before him had represented. He did not run for re-election in 1933. In 1943, he was elected President of the National Liberal Federation of Canada and was appointed to the Senate of Canada on February 19 of that year.

Senator Robertson was appointed to the cabinet as Leader of the Government in the Canadian Senate and minister without portfolio in 1945. He served as a delegate to the General Assembly of the United Nations in 1946. He was active in the civil section of the North Atlantic Treaty Organization (NATO) and helped establish international parliamentary groups to help set out the political, economic, and social goals of NATO.

Robertson was appointed Speaker of the Senate of Canada in 1953. He continued his efforts with NATO and formed the Canadian NATO Parliamentary Association in 1954 with himself as president. He encouraged the formation of similar associations in other countries. He won the 1954 Atlantic Award for outstanding service to the NATO community for his efforts that ultimately led to the formation of the NATO International Parliamentary Association in July 1955. Senator Robertson was Chairman of the founding conference and was elected Honorary Life President of the international association.

Robertson's term as the Senate's speaker ended with the defeat of the Liberal government in the 1957 election. Robertson remained a Senator until his resignation in 1965 due to ill health. He died in Ottawa at the age of 76.

== Archives ==
There is a Wishart Robertson fonds at Library and Archives Canada.

Party political offices
Preceded by Norman Alexander McLarty	President of the Liberal Party of Canada; 1943–1945	Succeeded by James Gordon Fogo
Government offices
Preceded by James Horace King	Leader of the Government in the Senate of Canada; 1948–1953	Succeeded by William Ross Macdonald
