= Doug Ferguson (politician) =

Canadian politician

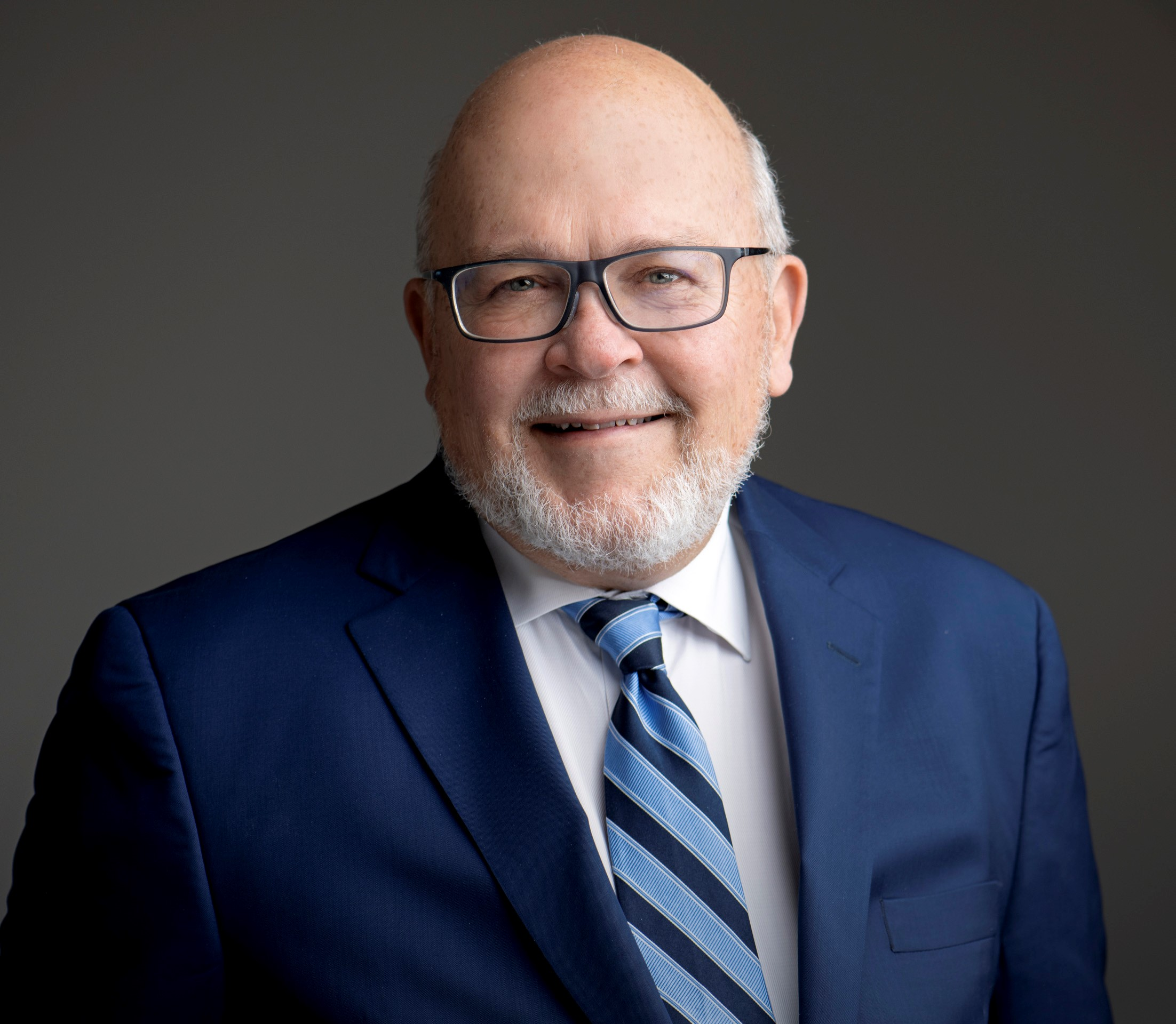
- Ferguson in 2023

President of the Liberal Party of Canada
- In office 2008–2009
- Preceded by: Marie Poulin
- Succeeded by: Alfred Apps

Personal details
- Party: Liberal Party of Canada
- Children: 3
- Parent: Ralph Ferguson (father)
- Education: University of Western Ontario
- Profession: Lawyer

Ferguson in 2010

Doug Ferguson is a Canadian politician who was the president of the Liberal Party of Canada from 2008-2009.

Born to Ralph and Dolores Ferguson and raised on a farm near Watford, Ontario, he received a Bachelor of Commerce degree at the University of Ottawa and a law degree from the University of Western Ontario.

== Biography ==
Ferguson was a lawyer for twenty years in London, Ontario practising civil litigation and estates before he joined the Faculty of Law, at the University of Western Ontario in 2003 as an adjunct professor and as Director of Community Legal Services. This legal clinic provides legal services to low income persons who cannot afford a lawyer; law students provide services under the supervision of clinic lawyers. While at Western Law, he authored three articles in academic journals on experiential learning in law schools, and founded the Association for Canadian Clinical Legal Education. Since leaving Western in 2020, Ferguson has served as a Small Claims Court deputy judge and carries on law practice as a sole practitioner.

== Awards ==
- Law Society Medal (2026)
- Alumnus of Distinction Award, Western Law (2009)

== Election results ==
2011 Canadian federal election: London West
Party	Candidate	Votes	%	±%	Expenditures
Conservative	Ed Holder	27,675	44.49	+5.40	–
Liberal	Doug Ferguson	16,652	26.77	-8.64	–
New Democratic	Peter Ferguson	16,109	25.90	+11.33	–
Green	Brad Arthur Corbett	1,703	2.74	-7.01	–
United	Rod Morley	65	0.10	–	–
Total valid votes		62,204	100.00	–	
Total rejected ballots		273	0.44	+0.08	–
Turnout		62,477	67.49	+4.35	
Eligible voters		92,572	–	–	
