= Sachit Mehra =

Canadian political organizer

President of the Liberal Party of Canada
- Incumbent
- Assumed office 6 May 2023
- Leader: Justin Trudeau; Mark Carney
- Preceded by: Suzanne Cowan

Personal details
- Born: Winnipeg, Manitoba, Canada

Sachit Mehra is a Canadian businessman and political organizer, serving as the president of the Liberal Party of Canada since 2023.

== Early life and career ==
Sachit Mehra was born in Winnipeg, Manitoba. His father, Kamal Mehra, moved from New Delhi to Canada in the 1960s. Mehra has been involved in the restaurant industry for several years, managing the East India Company Pub & Eatery, an Indian restaurant with locations in Winnipeg and Ottawa. He previously served as the Chairman of Winnipeg Downtown Business Improvement Zone from 2013 to 2016.

== Politics ==
Mehra has been an active member of the Liberal Party of Canada since his youth, and has served in several leadership roles, including as president of the Liberal Party of Canada in Manitoba. In 2014, he contested the ward of St. Norbert on Winnipeg City Council, finishing in second with 6,631 votes.

In May 2023, he was elected party president at the Ottawa national convention, defeating the party's Vice President (English) Mira Ahmad.

Following Justin Trudeau's resignation in 2025, he accepted the pending resignation and called the 2025 Liberal Party of Canada leadership election, in which Mark Carney was elected leader and thus as Prime Minister of Canada. Following a period of poor opinion polling, the party was able to form a minority government in the 2025 Canadian federal election, with 169 seats.
