= 1919 Liberal Party of Canada leadership election =

Party election in Canada

- August 7, 1919
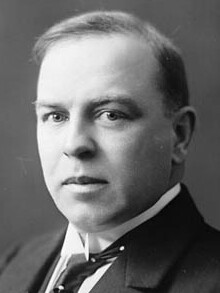

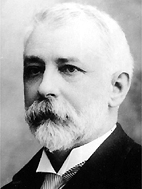

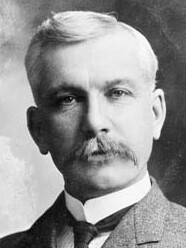

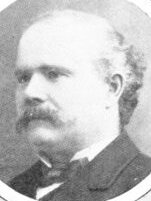
| Candidate | W.L. Mackenzie King | William S. Fielding |
| Fifth ballot delegate count | 476 (52.1%) | 438 (47.9%) |
| First ballot delegate count | 344 (36.3%) | 297 (31.3%) |
| Candidate | George P. Graham | Daniel D. McKenzie |
| Fifth ballot delegate count | Withdrew | Withdrew |
| First ballot delegate count | 153 (16.2%) | 153 (16.2%) |
Leader before election
Daniel Duncan McKenzie (interim)
Wilfrid Laurier
Elected Leader
William Lyon Mackenzie King

1919 Liberal leadership election
- Date: August 7, 1919
- Convention: Howick Hall, Lansdowne Park, Ottawa
- Resigning leader: Sir Wilfrid Laurier (deceased)
- Won by: William Lyon Mackenzie King
- Ballots: 5
- Candidates: 4

On August 7, 1919, the Liberal Party of Canada held a leadership convention, which was the first of its kind held by a federal political party in Canada. It was originally called by the Liberal leader, Sir Wilfrid Laurier, as a national policy convention with the intention of reinvigorating the Liberal Party after eight years of being in opposition. The convention was also intended to re-unite the party, which had split as a result of the Conscription Crisis of 1917. The party had divided into Laurier Liberals, who remained in opposition, and a Liberal–Unionist faction which joined the wartime Union government of Sir Robert Borden in support of conscription. Laurier's death on February 17, 1919 resulted in the meeting being reconfigured as a leadership convention. Previous party leaders in Canada had been chosen by the parliamentary caucus or the outgoing leader. However, the Liberal caucus no longer felt this practice was representative of Canada's linguistic and religious diversity and that allowing the entire party to select the leader would result in a more representative choice.

== Candidates ==
- William Lyon Mackenzie King, 44, was the former Minister of Labour (1909–1911) who had served as Member of Parliament for Waterloo North from 1908 until his defeat in 1911.
- William Stevens Fielding, 70, the MP for Shelburne and Queen's was a former Minister of Finance (1896–1911) and Premier of Nova Scotia (1884–1896).
- George Perry Graham, 60, the former MP for Renfrew South
- Daniel Duncan McKenzie, 60, the Liberal Party's interim leader since Laurier's death and the MP for North Cape Breton and Victoria.

There was also an attempt to draft Saskatchewan Premier William Melville Martin, a former Liberal MP, but he declined to run.

King had run as a Laurier Liberal in the 1917 federal election but was defeated. Fielding, who had long been seen as Laurier's natural successor, had opposed Laurier's stand on conscription and had returned to the House of Commons in 1917 as a Liberal–Unionist MP supporting the Borden government but declining the offer of a cabinet position. Graham had sat out of the 1917 election and McKenzie had run and kept his seat as a Laurier Liberal.

== Convention ==
=== Voting Delegates ===
This was the first time the Liberal Party elected its leader through a formal delegated leadership convention. Those who were eligible to be voting delegates were Senators (39 at the time), MPs (80 elected as Laurier Liberals in the 1917 election, and approximately 20 who were elected as Unionists but were members of the Liberal Party), defeated candidates (131), premiers and provincial party leaders, presidents of provincial Liberal associations, and three delegates from each of the 235 ridings.

At the time, almost no party in a Westminster system used any method of choosing a leader that had the involvement of the wider party, with new leaders either being designated by their outgoing predecessors, selected by the parliamentary caucus or, in the case of Commonwealth countries, being chosen by either the reigning monarch or by the Governor-General or equivalent. As a result, the convention was modelled after those used by the major political parties in the United States, with voting continuing until a candidate had a clear majority of votes, and no-one being eliminated between rounds. Unlike American political conventions, however, new candidates could not enter between rounds, nor could any candidate re-enter the vote after withdrawing. The Conservative Party would later use a similar system for their first leadership convention in 1927, before both parties adopted the now-standard practice of eliminating the candidate with the fewest votes on each ballot.

=== Nominations & Support ===
Nominations were accepted in writing until the first ballot began at 3:45 pm. King lead Fielding on the first and second ballots. Graham and McKenzie withdrew in quick succession leading to the cancellation of the third and fourth ballots, respectively, which had already been underway when the successive withdrawals occurred. On the final ballot King defeated Fielding by 38 votes.

King was supported by labour elements, Quebec delegates, and the left wing of the party. Fielding, who openly opposed the radical platform adopted by the convention, threatened to seek support from the parliamentary caucus for rejection of the platform. He was opposed by many Quebec delegates as well as delegates from his home province of Nova Scotia due to his previous stance on conscription and was supported by the right wing of the party, many western Canadian delegates, and the business establishment in Montreal.

== Results ==
The first ballot had King narrowly leading over Fielding, with Graham and McKenzie tying for a distant, joint third place. The second ballot saw King start to take a more decisive lead, mostly by attracting McKenzie's delegates, while Fielding attracted a smaller share of Graham's delegates, leaving the contest as a clear race between King and Fielding.

Shortly after the third ballot began, Graham withdrew his candidacy, acknowledging that he had no hope of victory. The ballot was cancelled and begun anew with three candidates, but McKenzie himself withdrew just after the fourth round had gotten underway, realizing that he could not credibly hope to remain in the contest when Graham had withdrawn despite having more votes.

The final ballot was close-run between King and Fielding, but in the end, King emerged victorious.

Delegate support by ballot
| Candidate | 1st ballot | | 2nd ballot | | 5th ballot | |
| Candidate | Votes cast | % | Votes cast | % | Votes cast | % |
|---|---|---|---|---|---|---|
| William Lyon Mackenzie King | 344 | 36.3% | 411 | 43.8% | 476 | 52.1% |
| William Stevens Fielding | 297 | 31.3% | 344 | 36.6% | 438 | 47.9% |
| George Perry Graham | 153 | 16.2% | 124 | 13.2% | Withdrew | |
| Daniel Duncan McKenzie | 153 | 16.2% | 60 | 6.4% | Withdrew | |
| Total | 947 | 100.0% | 939 | 100.0% | 914 | 100.0% |

First ballot
| King | 36.33% |
| Fielding | 31.36% |
| Graham | 16.16% |
| McKenzie | 16.16% |

Second ballot
| King | 43.77% |
| Fielding | 36.63% |
| Graham | 13.21% |
| McKenzie | 6.39% |

Fifth ballot
| King | 52.08% |
| Fielding | 47.92% |

== Aftermath ==
While he was without a seat at his election, King was able to return to parliament quickly when he was acclaimed as MP for Prince, Prince Edward Island, a seat left vacant by Joseph Read, a Liberal who died prior to the convention. While many Liberal Unionists returned to the fold at this convention, not all did. In June 1919, Thomas Crerar, Minister of Agriculture in the Unionist government, resigned from cabinet in protest of the budget. Eight other Unionist MPs from the west joined him over time and the group became the Progressive Party. The following year, Arthur Meighen became the leader of the Unionist government and attempted to incorporate the Liberal Unionists permanently by renaming his party the National Liberal and Conservative Party. The attempt was not successful however, as most Unionist Liberals either returned to the Liberal fold or joined the new Progressive Party.

In the subsequent 1921 election, the Liberals under King won the exact number of seats required to form a majority government, with the new Progressive Party winning more seats than the incumbent Conservatives. King was able to rule as a majority government throughout the 14th Parliament, as the Progressive Party did not enforce party discipline, meaning King could always count on at least a handful of Progressive MPs to shore up his near-majority position for any crucial vote.

King's three rivals all served in his cabinet when the Liberals were returned to power. Fielding served as Finance Minister, Graham as Defence Minister, and McKenzie as Solicitor General.
