= Nickerson (surname) =

Nickerson is a surname. Notable people with this surname include:

== Business ==
- Albert Nickerson (1911–1994), American executive with Mobil Oil, grandson of Albert W. Nickerson
- Albert W. Nickerson (1840–1893), American railroad executive, nephew of Thomas and grandfather of Albert
- Thomas Nickerson (railroad executive) (1810–1892), American railroad executive, uncle of Albert W. Nickerson
- William Nickerson Jr. (1879–1945), Los Angeles-based businessman and founder of Golden State Mutual Life Insurance Company
- William Emery Nickerson (1853–1930), American inventor and vice-president of The Gillette Company

== Law and politics ==
- Bruce William Nickerson (1941–2022), American civil rights and gay rights attorney
- Dave Nickerson (born 1944), Canadian politician from Northwest Territories
- Eugene Nickerson (1918–2002), Democratic county executive of Nassau County, New York, and a federal district court judge
- William M. Nickerson (born 1933), American judge in Maryland

== Merchants ==
- Ernest Reginald Nickerson (1876–1956), Canadian merchant and political figure in Nova Scotia
- Maurice Nickerson (1865–1936), Canadian general merchant and political figure in Nova Scotia; son of Moses H. Nickerson
- Smith Nickerson (1860–1954), Canadian merchant and political figure in Nova Scotia

== Military ==
- Franklin S. Nickerson (1826–1917), Union general during the American Civil War
- Henry Nehemiah Nickerson (1888–1979), American Medal of Honor recipient
- Herman Nickerson Jr. (1913–2000), United States Marine Corps general
- John C. Nickerson Jr. (1915–1964), United States Army colonel charged under the Espionage Act
- William Nickerson (British Army officer) (1875–1954), Canadian recipient of the Victoria Cross

== Sports ==
- Gaylon Nickerson (born 1969), American basketball player
- Hardy Nickerson (born 1965), American football player and coach
- Hardy Nickerson Jr. (born 1994), American football player
- Jonah Nickerson (born 1985), American baseball player
- Matt Nickerson (born 1985), American ice hockey player
- Parry Nickerson (born 1994), American football player
- Troy Nickerson, American wrestler
- Victor J. Nickerson (1928–2004), American Thoroughbred horse racing trainer

== Writing ==
- Billeh Nickerson (born 1972), Canadian writer, editor, and producer
- Raymond S. Nickerson, American psychologist and author
- Sheila Nickerson (born 1942), American poet and writer
- Sylvia Nickerson, Canadian comic book writer

== Other ==
- Camille Nickerson (1888–1982), American pianist, composer, and college professor
- Deborah Nickerson (1954–2021), American human genomics researcher
- Denise Nickerson (1957–2019), American actress who portrayed Violet Beauregarde in Willy Wonka & the Chocolate Factory
- Dorothy Nickerson (1900–1985), American color scientist and technologist
- Dustin Nickerson (born 1984), American stand-up comedian
- Edward I. Nickerson (1845–1908), American architect
- Freeman Nickerson (1779–1847), early missionary in Church of Jesus Christ of Latter Day Saints and a member of Zion's Camp
- Harry Nickerson (1962–1993), American criminal and murderer
- Jackson Nickerson (born 1962), American academic
- Joseph Nickerson (1914–1990), English farmer and entrepreneur
- Linus M. Nickerson (1823–1888), American minister, Army chaplain, and Indian agent
- Lyra B. Nickerson (1886–1916), American heiress and philanthropist
- Moses H. Nickerson (1844–1943), Canadian journalist, poet and political figure in Nova Scotia; father of Maurice Nickerson
- Thomas Nickerson (1805–1883), cabin boy aboard the whaling ship Essex whose sinking was the inspiration for Herman Melville's Moby Dick

== See also ==
- Nickerson (disambiguation)
- Nicholson (name)
