= Shelburne (provincial electoral district) =

Provincial electoral district in Nova Scotia, Canada

Nova Scotia electoral district

Provincial electoral district
- Legislature: Nova Scotia House of Assembly
MLA
Nolan Young
Progressive Conservative
- District created: 1867, 2019
- District abolished: 2013
- Last contested: 2024

Demographics
- Population (2011): 14,495
- Electors: 11,661
- Area (km²): 2,578
- Pop. density (per km²): 5.6
- Census division: Shelburne County
- Census subdivision(s): Barrington, Clark's Harbour, Lockeport, Shelburne (municipal district), Shelburne (town)

Shelburne is a provincial electoral district in Nova Scotia, Canada which existed between 1867 and 2013 and since 2021. Since 2021 and between 1933 and 2013 it has elected one member to the Nova Scotia House of Assembly; from 1867 to 1933 it elected two members. The electoral district includes Shelburne County in its entirety.

The electoral district was abolished following the 2012 electoral boundary review and was largely replaced by the new electoral districts of Queens-Shelburne and Argyle-Barrington. It was re-created following the 2019 electoral boundary review out of those districts.

== Geography ==
Shelburne has 2,578 km^{2} (995 sq mi) of landmass.

== Members of the Legislative Assembly ==
The electoral district was represented by the following members of the Legislative Assembly:

Shelburne
Legislature	Years	Member	Party
40th	1933–1937	Henry R. L. Bill	Liberal
41st	1937–1941	Henry R. L. Bill	Liberal
42nd	1941–1945	Wilfred Dauphinee	Liberal
43rd	1945–1949	Wilfred Dauphinee	Liberal
44th	1949–1953	Wilfred Dauphinee	Liberal
45th	1953–1956	Wilfred Dauphinee	Liberal
46th	1956–1960	James McKay Harding	Progressive Conservative
47th	1960–1963	James McKay Harding	Progressive Conservative
48th	1963–1967	James McKay Harding	Progressive Conservative
49th	1967–1970	James McKay Harding	Progressive Conservative
50th	1970–1974	Harold Huskilson	Liberal
51st	1974–1978	Harold Huskilson	Liberal
52nd	1978–1981	Harold Huskilson	Liberal
53rd	1981–1984	Harold Huskilson	Liberal
54th	1984–1988	Harold Huskilson	Liberal
55th	1988–1993	Harold Huskilson	Liberal
56th	1993–1998	Clifford Huskilson	Liberal
57th	1998–1999	Clifford Huskilson	Liberal
58th	1999–2003	Cecil O'Donnell	Progressive Conservative
59th	2003–2006	Cecil O'Donnell	Progressive Conservative
60th	2006–2009	Sterling Belliveau	New Democratic
61st	2009–2013	Sterling Belliveau	New Democratic
District dissolved into Queens-Shelburne and Argyle-Barrington
District recreated from Queens-Shelburne and Argyle-Barrington
64th	2021–2024	Nolan Young	Progressive Conservative
65th	2024–present	Nolan Young	Progressive Conservative

Legislature	Years	Member	Party
Shelburne returned two members before 1933
39th	1928–1933	Henry R. L. Bill	Liberal	Wishart McLea Robertson	Liberal
38th	1925–1928	Ernest Reginald Nickerson	Conservative	Norman Emmons Smith	Conservative
37th	1920–1925	Robert Irwin	Liberal	Ernest Howard Armstrong	Liberal
37th	1920	Robert Irwin	Liberal	Frank E. Smith	Liberal
36th	1916–1920	Robert Irwin	Liberal	Maurice Nickerson	Liberal
35th	1911–1916	Robert Irwin	Liberal	Smith Nickerson	Liberal
34th	1906–1911	Robert Irwin	Liberal	Moses H. Nickerson	Liberal
33rd	1904–1906	George Augustus Cox	Liberal	Moses H. Nickerson	Liberal
33rd	1902–1904	Thomas Johnston	Liberal	Moses H. Nickerson	Liberal
33rd	1901–1902	Thomas Johnston	Liberal	Thomas Robertson	Liberal
32nd	1897–1901	Thomas Johnston	Liberal	Thomas Robertson	Liberal
31st	1894–1897	Thomas Johnston	Liberal	Thomas Robertson	Liberal
30th	1890–1894	Thomas Johnston	Liberal	Charles Cahan	Liberal-Conservative
29th	1886–1890	Thomas Johnston	Liberal	William F. McCoy	Liberal
28th	1882–1886	Thomas Johnston	Liberal	William F. McCoy	Liberal
27th	1878–1882	Nathaniel Whitworth White	Liberal-Conservative	Nehemiah McGray	Liberal-Conservative
26th	1874–1878	Thomas Johnston	Liberal	Robert Robertson	Liberal
25th	1871–1874	Thomas Johnston	Liberal	Robert Robertson	Liberal
24th	1867–1871	Thomas Johnston	Liberal	Robert Robertson	Liberal

== Election results ==
=== 2024 ===
2024 Nova Scotia general election
Party	Candidate	Votes	%	±%
Progressive Conservative	Nolan Young	3,092	76.80	+14.24
New Democratic	Bridget Taylor	482	11.97	-0.09
Liberal	Debbie Muise	452	11.23	-12.53
Total valid votes		4,026		
Total rejected ballots		40		
Turnout		4,068	34.32	
Eligible voters		11,853		
Progressive Conservative hold		Swing		
Source: Elections Nova Scotia

=== 2021 ===
2021 Nova Scotia general election
Party	Candidate	Votes	%	±%	Expenditures
Progressive Conservative	Nolan Young	3,905	62.56	+16.28	$26,676.96
Liberal	Penny Smith	1,483	23.76	-10.02	$27,067.38
New Democratic	Darren Stoddard	753	12.06	-5.74	$22,519.99
Green	Steve Hirchak	101	1.62	-0.52	$200.00
Total valid votes/expense limit		6,242	99.55	–	$69,456.69
Total rejected ballots		28	0.45		
Turnout		6,270	54.50		
Eligible voters		11,505			
Progressive Conservative notional hold		Swing		+13.15	
Source: Elections Nova Scotia

=== 2017 (transposed) ===
2017 provincial election redistributed results
Party	Vote	%
Progressive Conservative	2,330	46.28
Liberal	1,701	33.78
New Democratic	896	17.80
Green	108	2.14

=== 2009 ===
2009 Nova Scotia general election: Shelburne County
Party	Candidate	Votes	%	±%
New Democratic	Sterling Belliveau	3,844	55.41%	19.14%
Progressive Conservative	Eddie Nickerson	1,637	23.59%	-11.41%
Liberal	Darian Huskilson	1,356	19.54%	-7.08%
Green	Robin Smith	101	1.46%	-0.64%
Total valid votes		6,938	100.00	
Total rejected ballots		20	0.29	
Turnout		6,958	59.67	
Eligible voters		11,661		
Source(s) Source: Nova Scotia Legislature (2024). "Electoral History for Shelburne County" (PDF). nslegislature.ca.

=== 2006 ===
2006 Nova Scotia general election: Shelburne County
Party	Candidate	Votes	%	±%
New Democratic	Sterling Belliveau	2,438	36.27%	25.64%
Progressive Conservative	Eddie Nickerson	2,353	35.00%	-13.58%
Liberal	Kirk Cox	1,790	26.63%	-14.15%
Green	Derek Jones	141	2.10%	–
Total valid votes		6,722	100.00	
Total rejected ballots		29	0.43	
Turnout		6,751	57.76	
Eligible voters		11,688		
Source(s) Source: Nova Scotia Legislature (2024). "Electoral History for Shelburne County" (PDF). nslegislature.ca.

=== 2003 ===
2003 Nova Scotia general election: Shelburne County
Party	Candidate	Votes	%	±%
Progressive Conservative	Cecil O'Donnell	3,702	48.59%	7.05%
Liberal	Clifford Huskilson	3,107	40.78%	-0.76%
New Democratic	Kendall Stoddard	810	10.63%	-6.29%
Total valid votes		7,619	100.00	
Total rejected ballots		30	0.39	
Turnout		7,649	71.33	
Eligible voters		10,724		
Source(s) Source: Nova Scotia Legislature (2024). "Electoral History for Shelburne County" (PDF). nslegislature.ca.

=== 1999 ===
1999 Nova Scotia general election: Shelburne County
Party	Candidate	Votes	%	±%
Progressive Conservative	Cecil O'Donnell	3,206	41.54%	6.76%
Liberal	Clifford Huskilson	3,206	41.54%	2.97%
New Democratic	Dianne Nickerson	1,306	16.92%	-9.73%
Total valid votes		7,718	100.00	
Total rejected ballots		33	0.42	
Turnout		7,751	63.99	
Eligible voters		12,112		
Source(s) Source: Nova Scotia Legislature (2024). "Electoral History for Shelburne County" (PDF). nslegislature.ca. Nova Scotia, Chief Electoral Officer (1999). Returns of the General Election for the House of Assembly, Thirty-Fifth General Election (Report). Elections Nova Scotia.

~In the riding of Shelburne, the Returning Officer had to cast the tie-breaking vote. It went to Cecil O'Donnell

=== 1998 ===
1998 Nova Scotia general election: Shelburne County
Party	Candidate	Votes	%	±%
Liberal	Clifford Huskilson	3,144	38.57%	-23.13%
Progressive Conservative	Cecil O'Donnell	2,835	34.78%	12.06%
New Democratic	Derek Jones	2,173	26.66%	18.80%
Total valid votes		8,152	100.00	
Total rejected ballots		42	0.51	
Turnout		8,194	66.18	
Eligible voters		12,381		
Source(s) Source: Nova Scotia Legislature (2024). "Electoral History for Shelburne County" (PDF). nslegislature.ca.

=== 1993 ===
1993 Nova Scotia general election: Shelburne County
Party	Candidate	Votes	%	±%
Liberal	Clifford Huskilson	5,438	61.70%	10.15%
Progressive Conservative	Mary E. Rose	2,002	22.71%	-19.13%
New Democratic	Kathleen K. Tudor	692	7.85%	1.24%
Independent	Kent A. Blades	507	5.75%	–
Independent	James M. Harding	175	1.99%	–
Total valid votes		8,814	100.00	
Total rejected ballots		62	0.70	
Turnout		8,876	70.46	
Eligible voters		12,597		
Source(s) Source: Nova Scotia Legislature (2024). "Electoral History for Shelburne County" (PDF). nslegislature.ca. Nova Scotia, Chief Electoral Officer (1993). Returns of the General Election for the House of Assembly, Thirty-Third General Election (PDF) (Report). Queen's Printer. Archived from the original (PDF) on 18 June 2018.

=== 1988 ===
1988 Nova Scotia general election: Shelburne County
Party	Candidate	Votes	%	±%
Liberal	Harold Huskilson	5,224	51.54%	5.45%
Progressive Conservative	Tim Van Zoost	4,241	41.85%	-2.04%
New Democratic	Ralph Niessen	670	6.61%	-0.60%
Total		10,135	–	
Source(s) Source: Nova Scotia Legislature (2024). "Electoral History for Shelburne County" (PDF). nslegislature.ca. Nova Scotia, Chief Electoral Officer (1988). Returns of the General Election for the House of Assembly, Thirty-Second General Election (PDF) (Report). Queen's Printer. Archived from the original (PDF) on 7 July 2018.

=== 1984 ===
1984 Nova Scotia general election: Shelburne County
Party	Candidate	Votes	%	±%
Liberal	Harold Huskilson	3,843	46.09%	-0.11%
Progressive Conservative	Ron Leary	3,659	43.88%	1.67%
New Democratic	Laurie Hitchens	601	7.21%	-4.39%
Independent	A. Etheren Goreham	235	2.82%	–
Total		8,338	–	
Source(s) Source: Nova Scotia Legislature (2024). "Electoral History for Shelburne County" (PDF). nslegislature.ca. Nova Scotia, Chief Electoral Officer (1984). Returns of the General Election for the House of Assembly, Thirty-First General Election (PDF) (Report). Queen's Printer. Archived from the original (PDF) on 31 July 2017.

=== 1981 ===
1981 Nova Scotia general election: Shelburne County
Party	Candidate	Votes	%	±%
Liberal	Harold Huskilson	3,765	46.20%	1.14%
Progressive Conservative	Warren Doane	3,440	42.21%	0.01%
New Democratic	Laurie Hitchens	945	11.60%	-1.15%
Total		8,150	–	
Source(s) Source: Nova Scotia Legislature (2024). "Electoral History for Shelburne County" (PDF). nslegislature.ca. Nova Scotia, Chief Electoral Officer (1981). Returns of the General Election for the House of Assembly, Thirtieth General Election (PDF) (Report). Queen's Printer. Archived from the original (PDF) on 31 July 2017.

=== 1978 ===
1978 Nova Scotia general election: Shelburne County
Party	Candidate	Votes	%	±%
Liberal	Harold Huskilson	3,932	45.06%	-2.52%
Progressive Conservative	A. Etheren Goreham	3,682	42.20%	-0.91%
New Democratic	Jane A. Strange	1,112	12.74%	3.43%
Total		8,726	–	
Source(s) Source: Nova Scotia Legislature (2024). "Electoral History for Shelburne County" (PDF). nslegislature.ca. Nova Scotia, Chief Electoral Officer (1978). Returns of the General Election for the House of Assembly, Twenty-Ninth General Election (PDF) (Report). Queen's Printer. Archived from the original (PDF) on 18 June 2018.

=== 1974 ===
1974 Nova Scotia general election: Shelburne County
Party	Candidate	Votes	%	±%
Liberal	Harold Huskilson	4,119	47.58%	-1.48%
Progressive Conservative	Ron Hatfield	3,732	43.11%	-0.63%
New Democratic	Dewey Waybret	806	9.31%	2.11%
Total		8,657	–	
Source(s) Source: Nova Scotia Legislature (2024). "Electoral History for Shelburne County" (PDF). nslegislature.ca. Nova Scotia, Chief Electoral Officer (1974). Returns of the General Election for the House of Assembly, Twenty-Eighth General Election (PDF) (Report). Queen's Printer. Archived from the original (PDF) on 18 June 2018.

=== 1970 ===
1970 Nova Scotia general election: Shelburne County
Party	Candidate	Votes	%	±%
Liberal	Harold Huskilson	3,725	49.06%	4.74%
Progressive Conservative	William J. Cox	3,321	43.74%	-2.86%
New Democratic	Aubrey Harding	547	7.20%	-1.88%
Total		7,593	–	
Source(s) Source: Nova Scotia Legislature (2024). "Electoral History for Shelburne County" (PDF). nslegislature.ca. Nova Scotia, Legislative Assembly (1970). Returns of the General Election for the House of Assembly, 1970 (PDF) (Report). Queen's Printer. Archived from the original (PDF) on 25 July 2018.

=== 1967 ===
1967 Nova Scotia general election: Shelburne County
Party	Candidate	Votes	%	±%
Progressive Conservative	James McKay Harding	3,271	46.60%	-7.80%
Liberal	Harold Huskilson	3,111	44.32%	-1.29%
New Democratic	Aubrey Harding	638	9.09%	–
Total		7,020	–	
Source(s) Source: Nova Scotia Legislature (2024). "Electoral History for Shelburne County" (PDF). nslegislature.ca. Nova Scotia Legislature (1967). Returns of the General Election for the House of Assembly (PDF) (Report). Queen's Printer. Archived from the original (PDF) on 25 July 2018.

=== 1963 ===
1963 Nova Scotia general election: Shelburne County
Party	Candidate	Votes	%	±%
Progressive Conservative	James McKay Harding	3,737	54.40%	1.46%
Liberal	Robert Quinlan Hood	3,133	45.60%	-1.46%
Total		6,870	–	
Source(s) Source: Nova Scotia Legislature (2024). "Electoral History for Shelburne County" (PDF). nslegislature.ca. Nova Scotia Legislature (1963). Returns of the General Election for the House of Assembly (PDF) (Report). Queen's Printer. Archived from the original (PDF) on 25 July 2018.

=== 1960 ===
1960 Nova Scotia general election: Shelburne County
Party	Candidate	Votes	%	±%
Progressive Conservative	James McKay Harding	3,539	52.94%	0.99%
Liberal	William Russell MacKay	3,146	47.06%	-0.99%
Total		6,685	–	
Source(s) Source: Nova Scotia Legislature (2024). "Electoral History for Shelburne County" (PDF). nslegislature.ca. Nova Scotia Legislature (1960). Returns of the General Election for the House of Assembly (PDF) (Report). Queen's Printer. Archived from the original (PDF) on 25 July 2018.

=== 1956 ===
1956 Nova Scotia general election: Shelburne County
Party	Candidate	Votes	%	±%
Progressive Conservative	James McKay Harding	3,337	51.95%	3.16%
Liberal	Wilfred Dauphinee	3,086	48.05%	-3.16%
Total		6,423	–	
Source(s) Source: Nova Scotia Legislature (2024). "Electoral History for Shelburne County" (PDF). nslegislature.ca. Nova Scotia Legislature (1956). Returns of the General Election for the House of Assembly (PDF) (Report). Queen's Printer. Archived from the original (PDF) on 10 September 2018.

=== 1953 ===
1953 Nova Scotia general election: Shelburne County
Party	Candidate	Votes	%	±%
Liberal	Wilfred Dauphinee	3,256	51.20%	-1.99%
Progressive Conservative	James McKay Harding	3,103	48.80%	1.99%
Total		6,359	–	
Source(s) Source: Nova Scotia Legislature (2024). "Electoral History for Shelburne County" (PDF). nslegislature.ca. Nova Scotia Legislature (1953). Returns of the General Election for the House of Assembly (PDF) (Report). Queen's Printer. Archived from the original (PDF) on 10 September 2018.

=== 1949 ===
1949 Nova Scotia general election: Shelburne County
Party	Candidate	Votes	%	±%
Liberal	Wilfred Dauphinee	3,436	53.20%	-2.65%
Progressive Conservative	Reginald Donald Ross	3,023	46.80%	8.52%
Total		6,459	–	
Source(s) Source: Nova Scotia Legislature (2024). "Electoral History for Shelburne County" (PDF). nslegislature.ca. Nova Scotia Legislature (1949). Returns of the General Election for the House of Assembly (PDF) (Report). Queen's Printer. Archived from the original (PDF) on 10 September 2018.

=== 1945 ===
1945 Nova Scotia general election: Shelburne County
Party	Candidate	Votes	%	±%
Liberal	Wilfred Dauphinee	3,214	55.85%	5.11%
Progressive Conservative	Frederick William Bower	2,203	38.28%	-10.99%
Co-operative Commonwealth	Cecil James O'Donnell	338	5.87%	–
Total		5,755	–	
Source(s) Source: Nova Scotia Legislature (2024). "Electoral History for Shelburne County" (PDF). nslegislature.ca. Nova Scotia Legislature (1945). Returns of the General Election for the House of Assembly (PDF) (Report). Queen's Printer. Archived from the original (PDF) on 10 September 2018.

=== 1941 ===
1941 Nova Scotia general election: Shelburne County
Party	Candidate	Votes	%	±%
Liberal	Wilfred Dauphinee	2,422	50.73%	-7.68%
Progressive Conservative	Frederick William Bower	2,352	49.27%	7.68%
Total		4,774	–	
Source(s) Source: Nova Scotia Legislature (2024). "Electoral History for Shelburne County" (PDF). nslegislature.ca. Nova Scotia Legislature (1941). Returns of the General Election for the House of Assembly (PDF) (Report). Queen's Printer. Archived from the original (PDF) on 8 February 2024.

=== 1937 ===
1937 Nova Scotia general election: Shelburne County
Party	Candidate	Votes	%	±%
Liberal	Henry R. L. Bill	3,215	58.41%	1.88%
Progressive Conservative	Norman Emmons Smith	2,289	41.59%	–
Total		5,504	–	
Source(s) Source: Nova Scotia Legislature (2024). "Electoral History for Shelburne County" (PDF). nslegislature.ca. Nova Scotia Legislature (1937). Returns of the General Election for the House of Assembly (PDF) (Report). Queen's Printer. Archived from the original (PDF) on 1 March 2019.

=== 1933 ===
1933 Nova Scotia general election: Shelburne County
Party	Candidate	Votes	%	±%
Liberal	Henry R. L. Bill	3,252	56.54%	2.29%
Liberal-Conservative	James W. Madden	2,500	43.46%	-2.29%
Total		5,752	–	
Source(s) Source: Nova Scotia Legislature (2024). "Electoral History for Shelburne County" (PDF). nslegislature.ca. Nova Scotia Legislature (1933). Returns of the General Election for the House of Assembly (PDF) (Report). Queen's Printer. Archived from the original (PDF) on 1 March 2019.

=== 1928 ===
1928 Nova Scotia general election: Shelburne County
Party	Candidate	Votes	%	Elected
Liberal	Henry R. L. Bill	2,474	27.13%	✓
Liberal	Wishart McLea Robertson	2,473	27.12%	✓
Liberal-Conservative	Ernest Reginald Nickerson	2,121	23.26%	
Liberal-Conservative	Norman Emmons Smith	2,052	22.50%	
Total		9,120	–	
Source(s) Source: Nova Scotia Legislature (2024). "Electoral History for Shelburne County" (PDF). nslegislature.ca.

=== 1925 ===
1925 Nova Scotia general election: Shelburne County
Party	Candidate	Votes	%	Elected
Liberal-Conservative	Ernest Reginald Nickerson	2,596	28.42%	✓
Liberal-Conservative	Norman Emmons Smith	2,452	26.84%	✓
Liberal	Ernest Howard Armstrong	2,087	22.84%	
Liberal	Robert Irwin	2,001	21.90%	
Total		9,136	–	
Source(s) Source: Nova Scotia Legislature (2024). "Electoral History for Shelburne County" (PDF). nslegislature.ca.

=== 1920 ===
Nova Scotia provincial by-election, 1920-09-02: Shelburne County
Party	Candidate	Votes	%	Elected
Liberal	Ernest Howard Armstrong	2,029	59.73%	✓
United Farmers	Zenos F. Bower	1,368	40.27%	
Total		3,397	–	
Source(s) Source: Nova Scotia Legislature (2024). "Electoral History for Shelburne County" (PDF). nslegislature.ca.

=== 1920 ===
1920 Nova Scotia general election: Shelburne County
Party	Candidate	Votes	%	Elected
Liberal	Robert Irwin	1,917	28.64%	✓
Liberal	Frank E. Smith	1,774	26.51%	✓
Liberal-Conservative	William T. Brannen	1,623	24.25%	
Liberal-Conservative	Wendell H. Currie	1,379	20.60%	
Total		6,693	–	
Source(s) Source: Nova Scotia Legislature (2024). "Electoral History for Shelburne County" (PDF). nslegislature.ca.

=== 1916 ===
1916 Nova Scotia general election: Shelburne County
Party	Candidate	Votes	%	Elected
Liberal	Robert Irwin	1,442	27.82%	✓
Liberal	Maurice Nickerson	1,424	27.47%	✓
Liberal-Conservative	W. H. Currie	1,205	23.24%	
Liberal-Conservative	W. C. Nickerson	1,113	21.47%	
Total		5,184	–	
Source(s) Source: Nova Scotia Legislature (2024). "Electoral History for Shelburne County" (PDF). nslegislature.ca.

=== 1911 ===
1911 Nova Scotia general election: Shelburne County
Party	Candidate	Votes	%	Elected
Liberal	Robert Irwin	1,245	26.64%	✓
Liberal	Smith Nickerson	1,202	25.72%	✓
Liberal-Conservative	R. Ward Fisher	1,120	23.97%	
Liberal-Conservative	George Phillips	1,106	23.67%	
Total		4,673	–	
Source(s) Source: Nova Scotia Legislature (2024). "Electoral History for Shelburne County" (PDF). nslegislature.ca.

=== 1906 ===
1906 Nova Scotia general election: Shelburne County
Party	Candidate	Votes	%	Elected
Liberal	Moses H. Nickerson	1,083	28.08%	✓
Liberal	Robert Irwin	975	25.28%	✓
Liberal-Conservative	N. R. Craig	930	24.11%	
Liberal-Conservative	T. C. Lockwood	869	22.53%	
Total		3,857	–	
Source(s) Source: Nova Scotia Legislature (2024). "Electoral History for Shelburne County" (PDF). nslegislature.ca.

=== 1904 ===
Nova Scotia provincial by-election, 1904-01-12: Shelburne County
Party	Candidate	Votes	%	Elected
Liberal	George Augustus Cox	974	58.67%	✓
Liberal-Conservative	William F. MacCoy	686	41.33%	
Total		1,660	–	
Source(s) Source: Nova Scotia Legislature (2024). "Electoral History for Shelburne County" (PDF). nslegislature.ca.

=== 1902 ===
Nova Scotia provincial by-election, 1902-12-10: Shelburne County
Party	Candidate	Votes	%	Elected
Liberal	Moses H. Nickerson	787	53.72%	✓
Liberal-Conservative	Andrew C. Robertson	678	46.28%	
Total		1,465	–	
Source(s) Source: Nova Scotia Legislature (2024). "Electoral History for Shelburne County" (PDF). nslegislature.ca.

=== 1901 ===
1901 Nova Scotia general election: Shelburne County
Party	Candidate	Votes	%	Elected
Liberal	Thomas Johnston	817	41.98%	✓
Liberal	Thomas Robertson	803	41.26%	✓
Independent	Arthur Hood	326	16.75%	
Total		1,946	–	
Source(s) Source: Nova Scotia Legislature (2024). "Electoral History for Shelburne County" (PDF). nslegislature.ca.

=== 1897 ===
1897 Nova Scotia general election: Shelburne County
Party	Candidate	Votes	%	Elected
Liberal	Thomas Johnston		N/A	✓
Liberal	Thomas Robertson		N/A	✓
Total			–	
Source(s) Source: Nova Scotia Legislature (2024). "Electoral History for Shelburne County" (PDF). nslegislature.ca.

=== 1894 ===
1894 Nova Scotia general election: Shelburne County
Party	Candidate	Votes	%	Elected
Liberal	Thomas Robertson	1,319	27.07%	✓
Liberal	Thomas Johnston	1,282	26.31%	✓
Liberal-Conservative	Charles Cahan	1,212	24.88%	
Liberal-Conservative	R. W. Freeman	1,059	21.74%	
Total		4,872	–	
Source(s) Source: Nova Scotia Legislature (2024). "Electoral History for Shelburne County" (PDF). nslegislature.ca.

=== 1890 ===
1890 Nova Scotia general election: Shelburne County
Party	Candidate	Votes	%	Elected
Liberal	Thomas Johnston	1,061	25.85%	✓
Liberal-Conservative	Charles Cahan	1,051	25.60%	✓
Liberal	William F. MacCoy	1,042	25.38%	
Liberal-Conservative	Alfred K. Smith	951	23.17%	
Total		4,105	–	
Source(s) Source: Nova Scotia Legislature (2024). "Electoral History for Shelburne County" (PDF). nslegislature.ca.

=== 1886 ===
1886 Nova Scotia general election: Shelburne County
Party	Candidate	Votes	%	Elected
Liberal	Thomas Johnston	1,188	30.97%	✓
Liberal	William F. MacCoy	1,063	27.71%	✓
Liberal-Conservative	Alfred K. Smith	860	22.42%	
Liberal-Conservative	Charles Cahan	725	18.90%	
Total		3,836	–	
Source(s) Source: Nova Scotia Legislature (2024). "Electoral History for Shelburne County" (PDF). nslegislature.ca.

=== 1882 ===
1882 Nova Scotia general election: Shelburne County
Party	Candidate	Votes	%	Elected
Liberal	Thomas Johnston	947	30.31%	✓
Liberal	William F. MacCoy	938	30.03%	✓
Liberal-Conservative	Nehemiah McGray	692	22.15%	
Liberal-Conservative	John Allan	547	17.51%	
Total		3,124	–	
Source(s) Source: Nova Scotia Legislature (2024). "Electoral History for Shelburne County" (PDF). nslegislature.ca.

=== 1878 ===
1878 Nova Scotia general election: Shelburne County
Party	Candidate	Votes	%	Elected
Liberal-Conservative	Nathaniel Whitworth White	1,140	29.29%	✓
Liberal-Conservative	Nehemiah McGray	989	25.41%	✓
Liberal	William F. MacCoy	892	22.92%	
Liberal	M. Nickerson	871	22.38%	
Total		3,892	–	
Source(s) Source: Nova Scotia Legislature (2024). "Electoral History for Shelburne County" (PDF). nslegislature.ca.

=== 1878 ===
Nova Scotia provincial by-election, 1878-02-27: Shelburne County
Party	Candidate	Votes	%	Elected
Liberal-Conservative	Nathaniel Whitworth White	373	56.69%	✓
Liberal	Thomas Robertson	285	43.31%	
Total		658	–	
Source(s) Source: Nova Scotia Legislature (2024). "Electoral History for Shelburne County" (PDF). nslegislature.ca.

=== 1875 by-election ===
Nova Scotia provincial by-election, 1875-01-21: Shelburne County
Party	Candidate	Votes	%	Elected
Liberal	Robert Robertson	acclaimed	N/A	✓
Total			–	
Source(s) Source: Nova Scotia Legislature (2024). "Electoral History for Shelburne County" (PDF). nslegislature.ca.

=== 1874 ===
1874 Nova Scotia general election: Shelburne County
Party	Candidate	Votes	%	Elected
Liberal	Thomas Johnston	acclaimed	N/A	✓
Liberal	Robert Robertson	acclaimed	N/A	✓
Total			–	
Source(s) Source: Nova Scotia Legislature (2024). "Electoral History for Shelburne County" (PDF). nslegislature.ca.

=== 1871 ===
1871 Nova Scotia general election: Shelburne County
Party	Candidate	Votes	%	Elected
Liberal	Thomas Johnston	826	30.72%	✓
Liberal	Robert Robertson	765	28.45%	✓
Liberal-Conservative	William F. MacCoy	570	21.20%	
Liberal-Conservative	J. H. Kendrick	528	19.64%	
Total		2,689	–	
Source(s) Source: Nova Scotia Legislature (2024). "Electoral History for Shelburne County" (PDF). nslegislature.ca.

=== 1867 by-election ===
Nova Scotia provincial by-election, 1867-12-05: Shelburne County
Party	Candidate	Votes	%	Elected
Anti-Confederation	Robert Robertson	acclaimed	N/A	✓
Total			–	
Source(s) Source: Nova Scotia Legislature (2024). "Electoral History for Shelburne County" (PDF). nslegislature.ca.

=== 1867 ===
1867 Nova Scotia general election: Shelburne County
Party	Candidate	Votes	%	Elected
Anti-Confederation	Thomas Johnston	acclaimed	N/A	✓
Anti-Confederation	Robert Robertson	acclaimed	N/A	✓
Total			–	
Source(s) Source: Nova Scotia Legislature (2024). "Electoral History for Shelburne County" (PDF). nslegislature.ca.

== See also ==
- List of Nova Scotia provincial electoral districts
- Canadian provincial electoral districts
