= Robert Irwin (Canadian politician) =

Canadian politician (1865–1941)

The Honourable Robert Irwin

MLA for Shelburne County
- In office June 20, 1906 – June 25, 1925 Serving with Moses H. Nickerson, Smith Nickerson, Maurice Nickerson, Frank E. Smith, Ernest Howard Armstrong
- Preceded by: Thomas Johnston; George A. Cox; Thomas Robertson; Moses H. Nickerson
- Succeeded by: Ernest Reginald Nickerson

Speaker of the Nova Scotia House of Assembly
- In office January 31, 1917 – June 25, 1925
- Preceded by: James F. Ellis
- Succeeded by: Albert Parsons

17th Lieutenant Governor of Nova Scotia
- In office April 7, 1937 – May 31, 1940
- Monarch: George VI
- Governors General: The Lord Tweedsmuir; The Earl of Athlone
- Premier: Angus Lewis Macdonald
- Preceded by: Walter Harold Covert
- Succeeded by: Frederick Francis Mathers

Personal details
- Born: January 17, 1865 Shelburne, Nova Scotia
- Died: May 16, 1941 (aged 75) Shelburne, Nova Scotia
- Party: Liberal
- Occupation: salesman

Robert Irwin (January 17, 1865 – May 16, 1941) was a merchant and political figure in Nova Scotia, Canada, and father of Robert Grandy and Prescott St. Clair. He represented Shelburne County in the Nova Scotia House of Assembly from 1906 to 1925 as a Liberal member. Irwin was the 17th Lieutenant Governor of Nova Scotia from 1937 to 1940.

== Life and career ==
He was born in Shelburne, Nova Scotia, the son of Robert Gore Irwin and Isabel Archer, and was educated there. Irwin worked for fifteen years as a travelling salesman before establishing a lumber and dry goods business at Shelburne. In 1894, he married Mary Prescott McGill. Irwin was speaker for the provincial assembly from 1917 to 1925. He died in Shelburne. His brother Harry Irwin was Hawaii Attorney General and a judge in Hawaii. His brother Fred was a physician and surgeon in Hawaii. They also had a brother named Archer.
