= William Nickerson =

William Nickerson may refer to:

- William Nickerson (British Army officer) (1875–1954), Canadian recipient of the Victoria Cross
- William Nickerson Jr. (1879–1945), Los Angeles-based businessman and founder of Golden State Mutual Life Insurance Company
- William Emery Nickerson (1853–1930), American inventor and vice-president of The Gillette Company
- William M. Nickerson (born 1933), American judge in Maryland

== See also ==
- Bruce William Nickerson (1941–2022), American civil rights and gay rights attorney
- Nickerson (surname)
