= George Brenton Laurie =

Nova Scotian army officer and author (1867-1915)

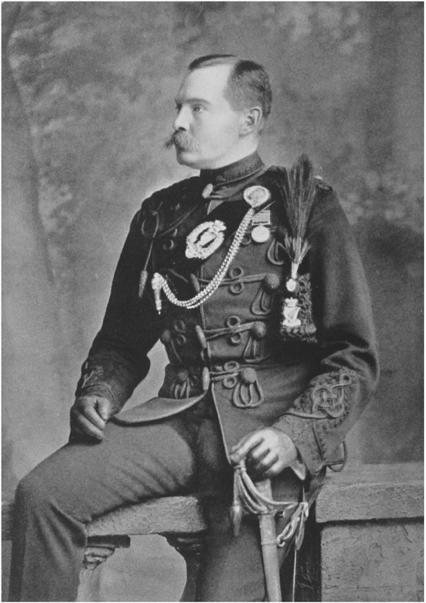
- George Brenton Laurie, Halifax Nova Scotia
- Born: 1867
- Died: 1915 (aged 47–48)
- Occupation: Army officer

George Brenton Laurie (1867 – 1915) was a Nova Scotian army officer and author who distinguished himself in the Boer War and in the First World War, in which he was killed in the Battle of Neuve Chapelle. General John Keir said he had "sterling qualities... His name remains one held in honour for all time."

== Early years ==
Laurie was the son of John Wimburn Laurie, and was born at Halifax, Nova Scotia, on October 13, 1867, and raised in Oakfield, Nova Scotia. At age 17, Laurie received his first commission in the Royal Irish Rifles in September 1885, and joined the 2nd Battalion, then quartered at Halifax.

He went with them to Gibraltar in November 1886, and on to Egypt in January 1888, where the following year Lieutenant Laurie went up the Nile with the battalion. He was promoted to captain on 20 November 1893.

== Boer War ==
In 1901 Laurie was posted to South Africa, and served in the Second Boer War until the war ended in June 1902. He was in command of the 28th battalion Mounted Infantry, and on 14 February 1902 received the local rank of major whilst in command. During the war he fought in the Transvaal, the Orange River Colony, and the Cape Colony. He was mentioned in Despatches for his services (London Gazette, July 29, 1902), and received the Queen's Medal with five clasps.

(Colonel Laurie's elder brother, Captain Haliburton Laurie, who was one of the most deservedly loved men of his generation, fell in the Boer War in 1901. Capt. Haliburton Laurie fell in the South African War at Philippolis, on a kopje, while rescuing a wounded patrol.)

The war ended in May 1902, and three months later Laurie returned to be a Regular captain in the 2nd Battalion of his regiment, still stationed in South Africa. He was promoted to major on 28 October 1904.

== World War 1 ==
=== First Battle of Ypres ===
During WW1, he went to France in November 1914 with the Irish Rifles and participated in the First Battle of Ypres. On November 21, 1914, he wrote from the trenches:

Very cold, and more snow-I wonder how we can stand it! ...Up at 11.30 p.m. to repulse an attack. That driven off, I rolled up in blankets to shiver until 1 a.m.... I crawled completely doubled up. Suddenly a sniper would see some part of me showing, and would then let drive at me. I had to duck, and then run like a hare until I got to a bank which gave some protection. Needless to say, my coat and riding things are already in holes.

Again, from the trenches on December 18, 1914, he wrote,

This morning one of my men was shot through the lungs, not far from our room, and he died at once. This just shows you what a time we go through here, always having to keep our eyes open!

=== Christmas 1914 ===
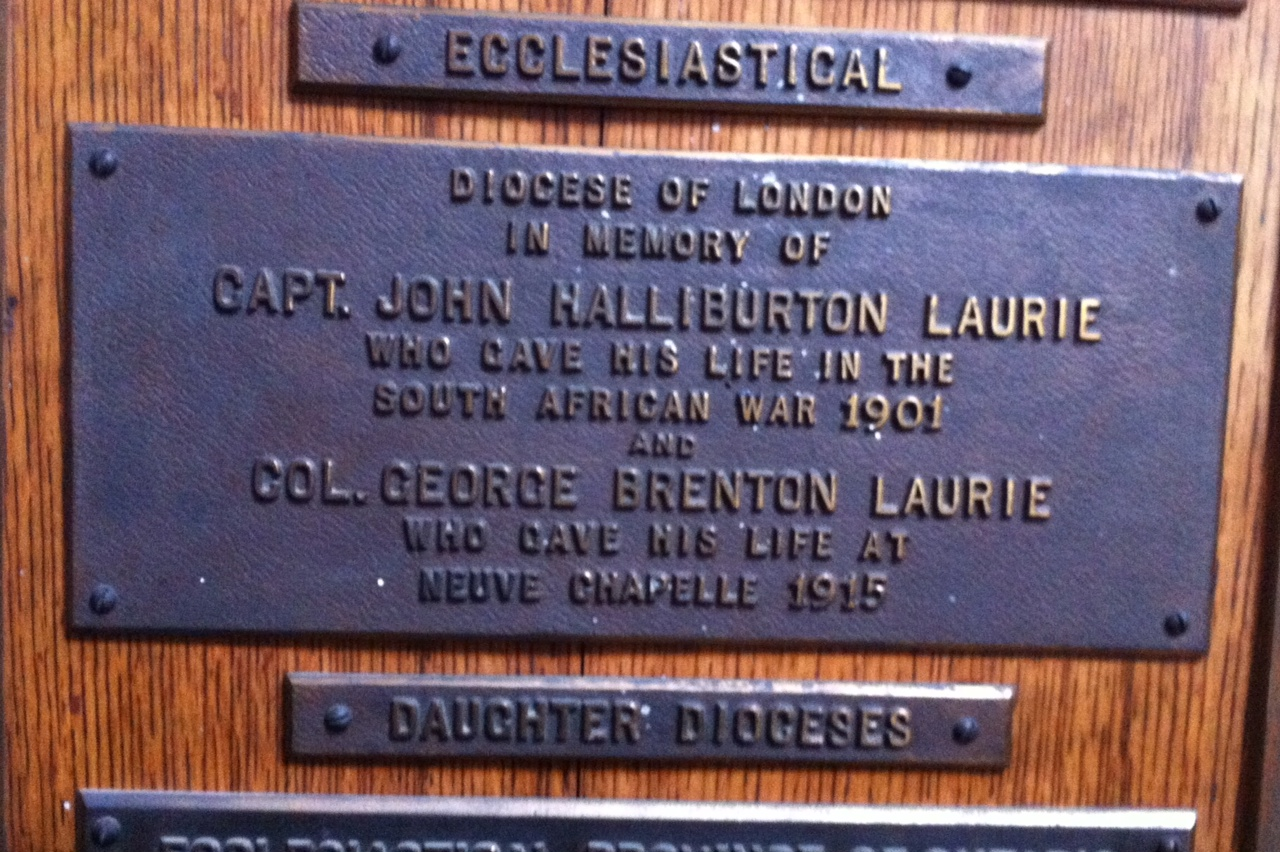
George Brenton Laurie Plaque, St. Paul's Church (Halifax), Nova Scotia

He also wrote about the momentary peace at Christmas. From the trenches, he wrote on Christmas Day 1914,

Here we are, on Christmas Day! We have had a curious time of it. Last night, about eleven o'clock, the enemy (100 yards only from us) put lanterns up on the parapet and called out: "Do not shoot after twelve o'clock, and we will not do so either." One of our men ventured across; he was not fired upon, and was given a cigar and told to go back. ... So now this is the queer position of affairs: we fire a pistol shot off at 12 midnight tonight by arrangement, and they reply with some shots over our heads, after which things continue to hum as before. You have no idea how pleasant everything seems with no rifle bullets or shells flying about. ... Whilst we are peaceable, the guns are booming out now and then some miles away on our left and right where the French are fighting.

Two days later on December 27, he wrote,

I am still in my hole in the earth. Very horrid. Have not washed nor shaved for two days, and am covered with mud from head to foot in thick layers. If I raise my head to stand up straight, a bullet skips about my ears. ... As I sit here I can hear the shells booming near us, and very heavy fighting on the left, whilst a solitary sniper keeps pouring bullets over my head, hitting all round the houses some four hundred yards behind me.

They spent the winter in the trenches, taking their share in the fierce fighting in December.

=== Battle of Neuve Chapelle ===
On March 10, 1915, Laurie took part in the Battle of Neuve Chapelle, and were the first battalion to reach the village. He was the first man who charged into Neuve Chapelle.

About 7.30 one of the soldiers reported:

"there began the biggest bombardment I have ever heard—our big guns roared out. I thought hell had been let loose. I tried to look before me but could see nothing but flame and smoke, and the roars of the big guns were terrible. In about an hour's time, our Colonel gave us the word to fix bayonets and charge for the German trenches."

On Friday evening, March 12, a fresh assault was ordered. Laurie rallied his exhausted men, and, calling out "Follow me! I will lead you!" he sprang over the parapet, revolver in hand. A moment later he fell shot through the head. He was buried with his fallen officers and men in a garden near Neuve Chapelle. During this war, he was twice Mentioned in Despatches (Gazette, January 14, 1915; and after his death, May 31, 1915).

== Family ==
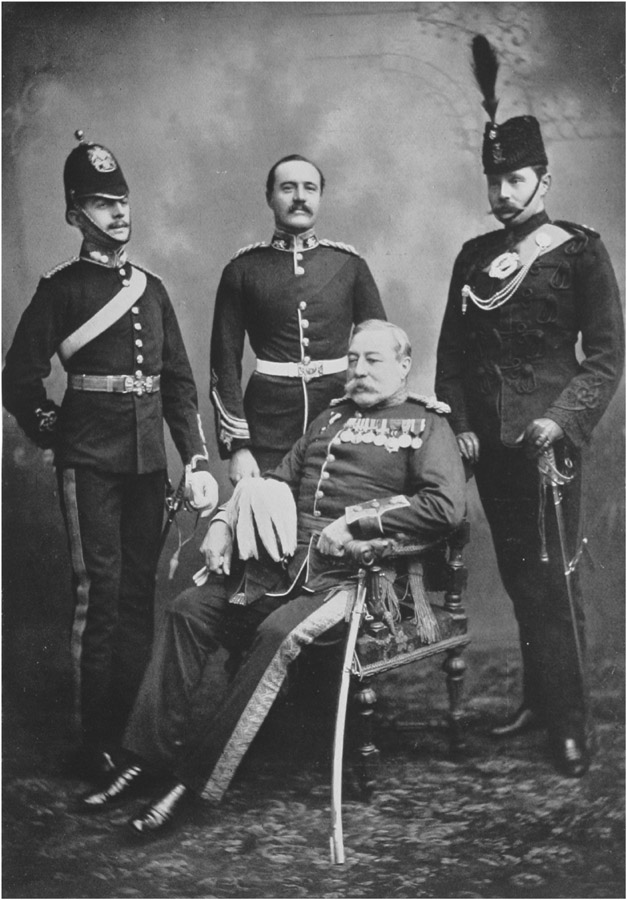
George (right), father John Wimburn Laurie (sitting), older brother Haliburton, (center, killed in the Second Boer War months after photo taken) and his younger brother (1901) (Painting of this photo is hung at Citadel Hill (Fort George), Halifax, Nova Scotia)

He was born to Lieut.-General John Wimburn Laurie, C.B., M.P., of 47, Porchester Terrace, London, and Mrs. Laurie, of Oakfield, Nova Scotia (She lived in Nova Scotia after her husband died and while George was in WW1). He was the grandson of the Hon. Enos Collins, M.L.C., of Gorse Brook, Halifax, and great-grandson of Sir Brenton Halliburton, Chief Justice of Nova Scotia.

His brother John was killed in the Second Boer War and is listed on the South African War Memorial (Halifax).

He married, in September 1905, Florence Clementina Vere Skeffington, eldest daughter of the late Hon. Sydney William Skeffington, and left three children—George Haliburton, born August 1906; Blanche, born 1907; and Sydney Vere, born 1910.

His father was given a coffee pot by Dr. Inglis, which was a precious heirloom in Colonel Laurie's family.

== See also ==
- Military history of Nova Scotia
