= Ernest Howard Armstrong =

Canadian politician (1864–1946)

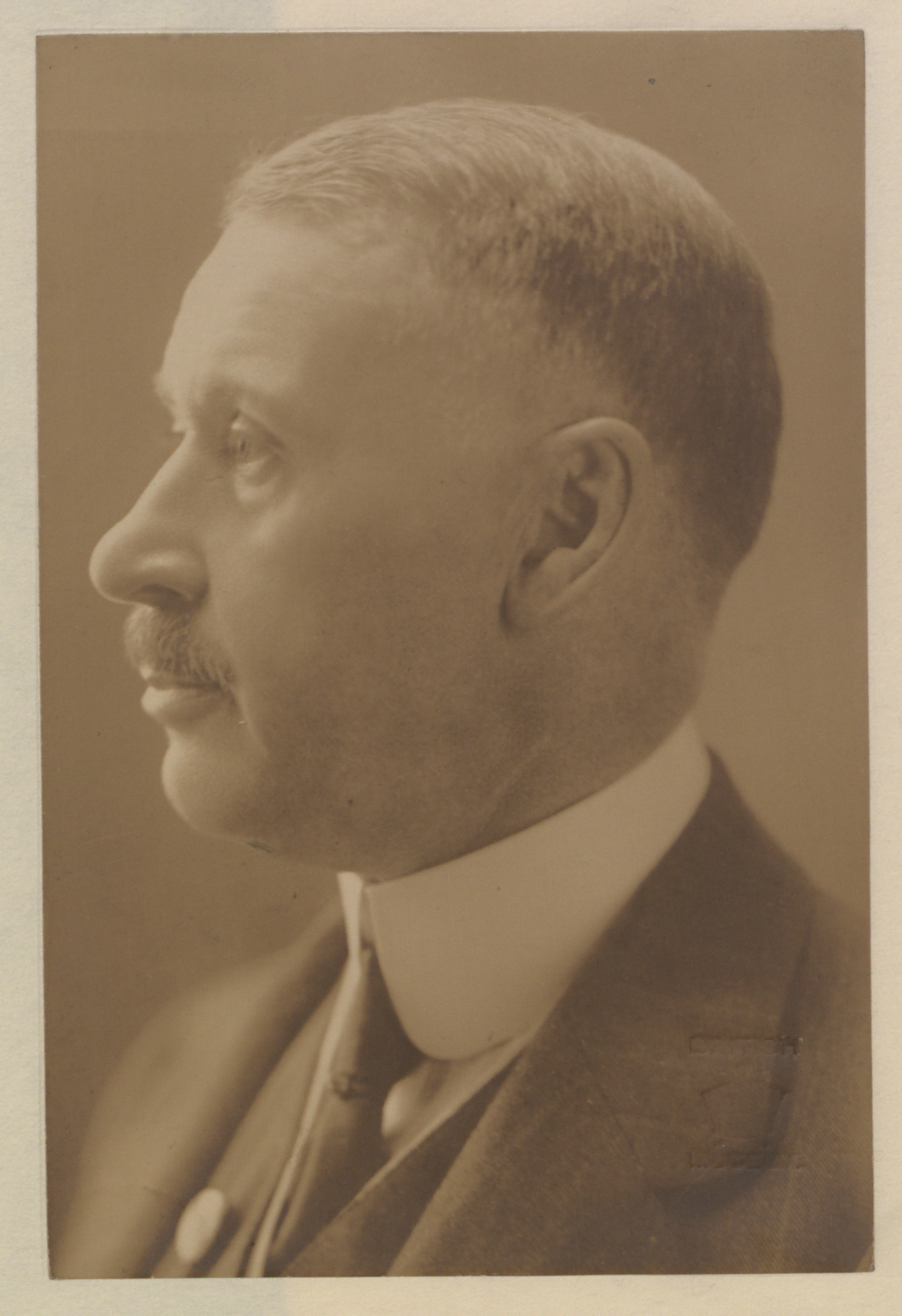

9th Premier of Nova Scotia
- In office January 24, 1923 – July 16, 1925
- Monarch: George V
- Lieutenant Governor: MacCallum Grant; James Robson Douglas
- Preceded by: George Henry Murray
- Succeeded by: Edgar Nelson Rhodes

MLA for Yarmouth County
- In office June 20, 1906 – July 27, 1920 Serving with Henry S. LeBlanc, Henry T. d'Entremont
- Preceded by: George G. Sanderson
- Succeeded by: Howard Corning

MLA for Shelburne County
- In office July 27, 1920 – June 25, 1925 Serving with Frank E. Smith, Robert Irwin
- Preceded by: Frank E. Smith
- Succeeded by: Norman Emmons Smith

Personal details
- Born: July 27, 1864 Kingston, Nova Scotia
- Died: February 15, 1946 (aged 81) Bridgewater, Nova Scotia
- Party: Liberal
- Occupation: Lawyer, journalist

Ernest Howard Armstrong, KC (July 27, 1864 – February 15, 1946) was a Canadian politician and journalist who served as the ninth premier of Nova Scotia from 1923 to 1925.

== Early life and career ==
Born in Kingston, Nova Scotia, the son of Edward and Sarah A. (Currell) Armstrong, Armstrong studied at Acadia University and Dalhousie University where he received a Bachelor of Laws degree.

He was created King's Counsel in 1907. He practiced law in Weymouth, Nova Scotia from 1889 to 1892 and during that period was also editor of the Weymouth Free Press.

In 1892, he moved to Yarmouth, Nova Scotia where he held the office of vice and deputy United States Consul from 1894 to 1906.

== Political career ==
He was elected to the town council in 1900 and was the mayor of Yarmouth from 1904 to 1906, when he won a seat in the Nova Scotia House of Assembly. He joined the Cabinet of Liberal Premier George Henry Murray in 1911 and served as minister of public works and then as minister of mines.

In 1923, Armstrong succeeded Murray as Premier and inherited a Liberal government that had been in power for 40 years. Armstrong was unable to overcome the effects of a serious economic downturn in the region, underestimated the strength of the Maritime Rights Movement and the feelings of alienation among Nova Scotians, and also mishandled labour unrest in Cape Breton, all of which led to the defeat of his government in the 1925 election. The Liberals won only three seats out of 43 in the legislature. He died in Bridgewater, Nova Scotia.
