= Henry R. L. Bill =

Canadian politician

MLA for Shelburne
- In office 1928–1941
- Preceded by: Ernest Reginald Nickerson; Norman Emmons Smith
- Succeeded by: Wilfred Dauphinee

Personal details
- Born: March 27, 1870 Lockeport, Nova Scotia
- Died: December 16, 1942 (aged 72) Lockeport, Nova Scotia
- Party: Nova Scotia Liberal Party
- Occupation: wholesale fish merchant

Henry Ryder Locke Bill (March 27, 1870 – December 16, 1942) was a Canadian politician. He represented the electoral district of Shelburne in the Nova Scotia House of Assembly from 1928 to 1941. He was a member of the Nova Scotia Liberal Party.

Born in 1870 at Lockeport, Nova Scotia, Bill was a wholesale fish merchant by career. He married Ida L. Silver in 1895. Bill served as mayor of Lockeport from 1905 to 1912 and 1919–1924. Bill also served as a member of the Royal Fisheries Commission from 1927 to 1928.

Bill entered provincial politics in 1928, when he was elected in the dual-member Shelburne riding with Liberal Wishart McLea Robertson. He was re-elected in the now single-member Shelburne riding in the 1933 election. In the 1937 election, Bill was re-elected, defeating former Conservative MLA Norman Emmons Smith by 926 votes. He did not reoffer in the 1941 election. Bill died on December 16, 1942, at Lockeport.
