= George Carr =

George Carr may refer to:

- George Kirwan Carr Lloyd (aka George Kirwan Carr, 1810–1877), English army officer and Sussex landowner
- G. S. Carr (George Shoobridge Carr, 1837–1914), British mathematician
- George Watts Carr (1893–1975), American architect
- George Carr (baseball) (1894–1948), American baseball player
- George Carr (footballer) (1899–?), English football player and manager
- George C. Carr (1929–1990), American lawyer and United States federal judge

== See also ==
- Frank George Griffith Carr (1903–1991), director of the National Maritime Museum, Greenwich, England
- George Carr Frison (1924–2020), American archaeologist
- Dr. George W. Carr House, an historic house in the College Hill neighborhood of Providence, Rhode Island
