= Nickerson =

Nickerson may refer to:

== People ==
- Nickerson (surname)

=== Fictional characters ===
- Coach Burt Nickerson, a character in the movie All the Right Moves played by Craig T. Nelson
- Marty Nickerson, the main character, a fictional attorney, in the four books written by Rose Connors
- Ned Nickerson, boyfriend of Nancy Drew in the Nancy Drew Mystery Stories series

== Places ==
=== Antarctica ===
- Mount Nickerson, in the Ross Dependency
- Nickerson Ice Shelf, in Marie Byrd Land

=== United States ===
==== Communities ====
listed alphabetically by state

- Nickerson, Kansas
- Nickerson Township, Pine County, Minnesota
  - Nickerson, Minnesota
- Nickerson Township, Dodge County, Nebraska
  - Nickerson, Nebraska

==== Locations ====
listed alphabetically by name

- Nickerson Farms, a former roadside restaurant franchise in the Midwestern United States
- Nickerson Field, a sports stadium at Boston University
- Nickerson Gardens, a public housing project in Los Angeles
- Nickerson House, a Chicago landmark and home to the Driehaus Museum
- Nickerson Mansion, a historic house in Brewster, Massachusetts
- Nickerson Mountain, a mountain located in Carroll County, New Hampshire
- Nickerson State Park, a state park in Massachusetts

== See also ==
- Nicholson (disambiguation)
- Nickelsen
- Nicolson
