= Harold Huskilson =

Canadian politician

Harold MacKay Huskilson
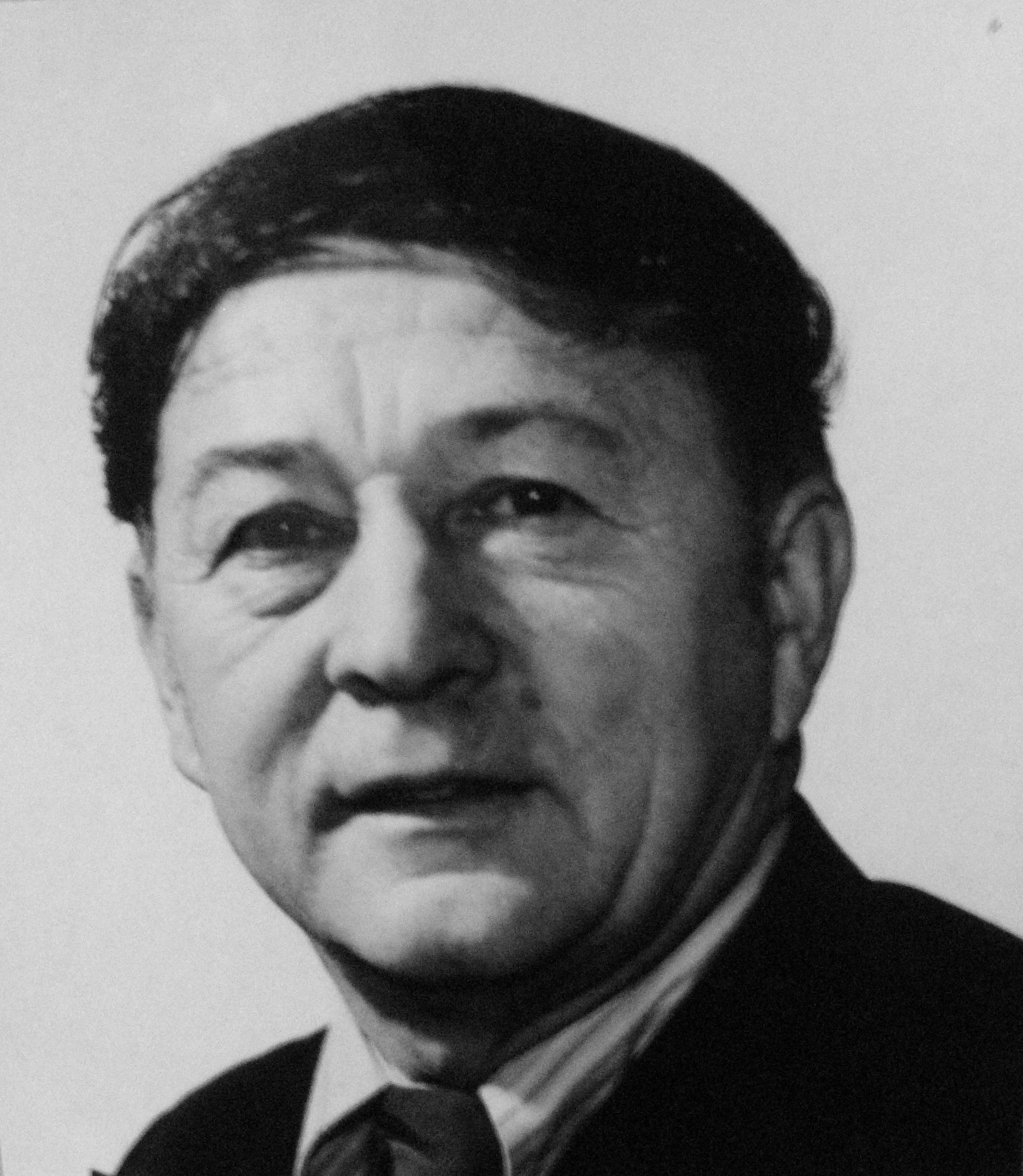
- Huskilson, c. 1973

MLA for Shelburne County
- In office 1970–1993
- Preceded by: James McKay Harding
- Succeeded by: Clifford Huskilson

Personal details
- Born: March 25, 1920 Lockeport, Nova Scotia
- Died: October 24, 2011 (aged 91) Barrington Passage, Nova Scotia
- Party: Liberal
- Occupation: Politician

Harold MacKay Huskilson (March 25, 1920 – October 24, 2011) was a political figure in Nova Scotia, Canada. He represented Shelburne County in the Nova Scotia House of Assembly from 1970 to 1993 as a Liberal member.

== Early life ==
He was a son of the late Lewis and Sarah (Lloyd) Huskilson. After graduation from Lockeport Regional High School, he attended Mount Allison University. His education was interrupted due to World War II until 1945. After the war he studied at the Renaud School of Embalming in New York City and graduated in 1946.

== Entrance to politics ==
Huskilson made his way into a life of politics where he served on both the Shelburne Town Council and the Yarmouth Town Council. He resigned when he was elected to the Nova Scotia House of Assembly, and successfully held the seat for 23 years in Shelburne.

== Personal life ==
He was married to Elsie, and they have two children, Elizabeth and Clifford. He died in 2011 at the age of 91.
