= Joshua Snow =

Nova Scotian politician

Joshua Snow (June 28, 1804 – January 8, 1870) was a merchant and political figure in Nova Scotia. He represented Shelburne township in the Nova Scotia House of Assembly from 1847 to 1851 as a Conservative.

He was born in Shelburne, Nova Scotia, probably the son of Joshua Snow and Eleanor Ann Graves. In 1826, he married Ann Isabella Snyder. Snow died in Shelburne at the age of 66.

His daughter Mary married Nathaniel Whitworth White.
