= Thomas Coffin (Nova Scotia politician) =

Canadian politician (1816–1890)

The Honourable Thomas Coffin PC
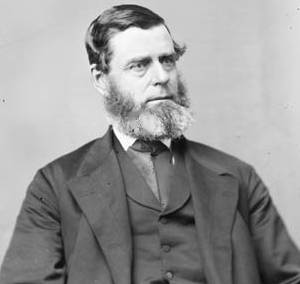

Member of the Canadian Parliament for Shelburne
- In office 1867–1878
- Preceded by: District was created by British North America Act, 1867
- Succeeded by: Thomas Robertson

Personal details
- Born: 1817 Barrington, Colony of Nova Scotia
- Died: July 13, 1890 (aged 72–73) Barrington, Nova Scotia, Canada
- Party: Liberal (1873-1878)
- Other political affiliations: Liberal-Conservative (1869-1873); Anti-Confederate (1867-1869)
- Cabinet: Receiver General (1873–1878)

Thomas Coffin, PC (February 27, 1816 – July 12, 1890) was a Canadian businessman and politician.

He was born in Barrington, Shelburne County, Nova Scotia in 1817. He owned a general store and with his brother and other partners operated a sawmill and shipbuilding yard on the Clyde River from 1854 until late in the 1870s. In 1855, he was named a justice of the peace and he served as school commissioner in Shelburne County and the Barrington district. He represented Shelburne County in the Nova Scotia House of Assembly as a Reformer from 1851 to 1855 and as a Liberal from 1859 until Confederation. In 1867, he was elected to the 1st Canadian Parliament representing the riding of Shelburne as a Liberal-Conservative supporter of Sir John A. Macdonald. He was re-elected in 1872 and crossed the floor the next year to join the Liberal Party of Canada. He was re-elected 1874 and defeated in 1878. From 1873 to 1878, he was the Receiver General. He died in Barrington in 1890.

1867 Canadian federal election: Shelburne
Party	Candidate	Votes
Anti-Confederation	Thomas Coffin	acclaimed
Source: Canadian Elections Database

1872 Canadian federal election: Shelburne
Party	Candidate	Votes
Liberal–Conservative	Thomas Coffin	acclaimed
Source: Canadian Elections Database

By-election on 9 December 1873 On Mr. Coffin being appointed Receiver-General of Canada, 7 November 1873
Party	Candidate	Votes
Liberal	Thomas Coffin	acclaimed

1874 Canadian federal election: Shelburne
Party	Candidate	Votes
Liberal	Thomas Coffin	acclaimed
lop.parl.ca

1878 Canadian federal election: Shelburne
Party	Candidate	Votes
Liberal	Thomas Robertson	966
Unknown	Robert W. Freeman	899
Liberal	Thomas Coffin	198

Political offices
Preceded by Théodore Robitaille	Receiver General; 1873–1878	Succeeded by Alexander Campbell
