= John Wimburn Laurie =

Canadian military officer and politician (1835–1912)

Lieutenant-General John Wimburn Laurie CB
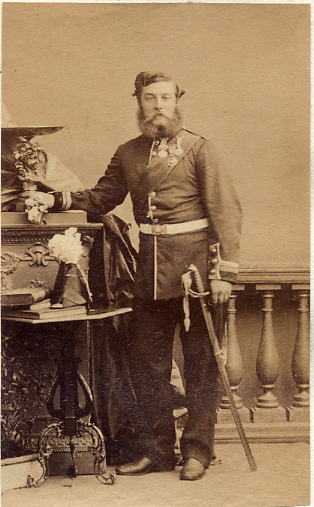
- Laurie in 1859
- Born: 1 October 1835
- Died: 19 May 1912 (aged 76)

Lieutenant-General John Wimburn Laurie, CB (1 October 1835 – 19 May 1912) was a soldier and political figure in Nova Scotia, Canada for thirty years and then returned to England.

== Military career ==
He was born in London, England, the son of John Laurie and Eliza Helen Collett, and educated at Harrow, at Dresden, and at the Royal Military College, Sandhurst. He entered the British Army in 1853 and served in 4th Kings Own Regiment in Crimea (1855) and Mauritius (1857) on his way to India (1858). He served in South Africa (1881). While in Nova Scotia, Laurie also served during the North-West Rebellion of 1885, at which point he was the highest-ranking officer in Canada. He achieved the rank of Lieutenant General in 1887.

== Nova Scotia ==
In 1862 he arrived in Halifax, Nova Scotia, married Frances Robie Collins (daughter of Enos Collins) in 1863, and developed Oakfield, Nova Scotia on the shores of Grand Lake. Laurie was warden for Halifax County in 1880. He was appointed Lieutenant General (1881), became an MP for Shelburne in the Canadian House of Commons (1887-1891).

In 1886, he greeted James J. Bremner and the Halifax Volunteer Battalion upon their return from the North-West Rebellion. He was defeated by Thomas Robertson in the 1887 general election; Robertson's election was overturned on appeal and Laurie won the subsequent by-election later the same year. That election was declared void but Laurie was elected again in 1888. He represented Shelburne in the House of Commons of Canada from 1887 to 1891 as a Conservative member.

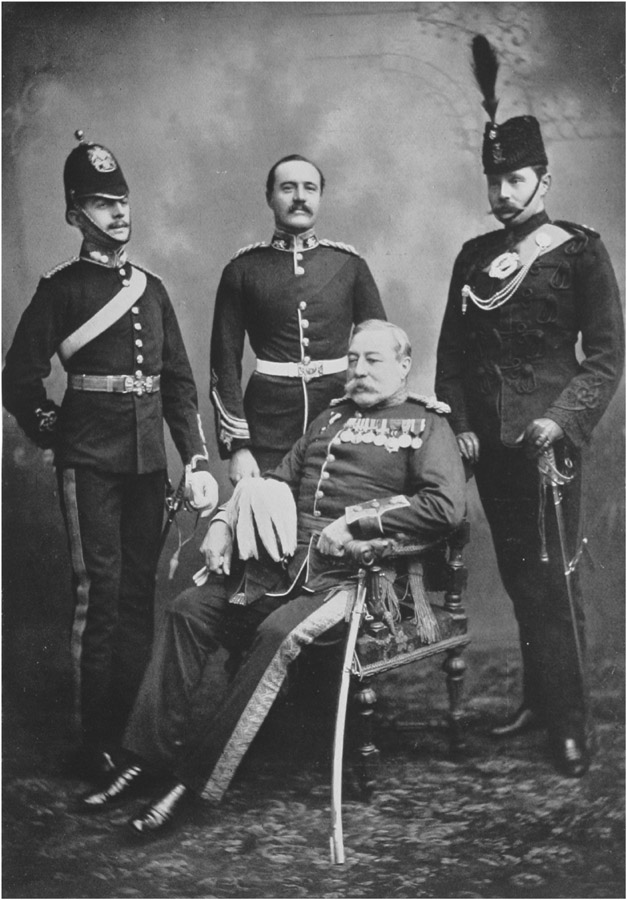
Laurie (sitting) and three of his sons (1901) (Painting of this photo is hung at Citadel Hill (Fort George), Halifax, Nova Scotia)

Laurie was a prominent freemason, serving as Grand Master for Nova Scotia and provincial grand master for South Wales. During his time in Nova Scotia, he served as president of the Central Board of Agriculture. Laurie was chairman of the Canadian trade section of the London Chamber of Commerce. He was named a knight of the Order of St. Sava and of the Order of the Red Cross of Serbia.

== England ==
Although retaining Oakfield, he returned to England in 1889 and was an unsuccessful candidate for a seat in the British House of Commons in 1892. He was elected a member of the British House of Commons at the next general election, representing Pembroke and Haverfordwest from 1895 to 1906. He entered local politics, becoming Mayor of Paddington in 1907.

He was appointed a Companion of the Order of the Bath (CB) civil division in the November 1902 Birthday Honours list, and advanced to a Companion of the military division in the 1905 Birthday Honours.

== Family ==
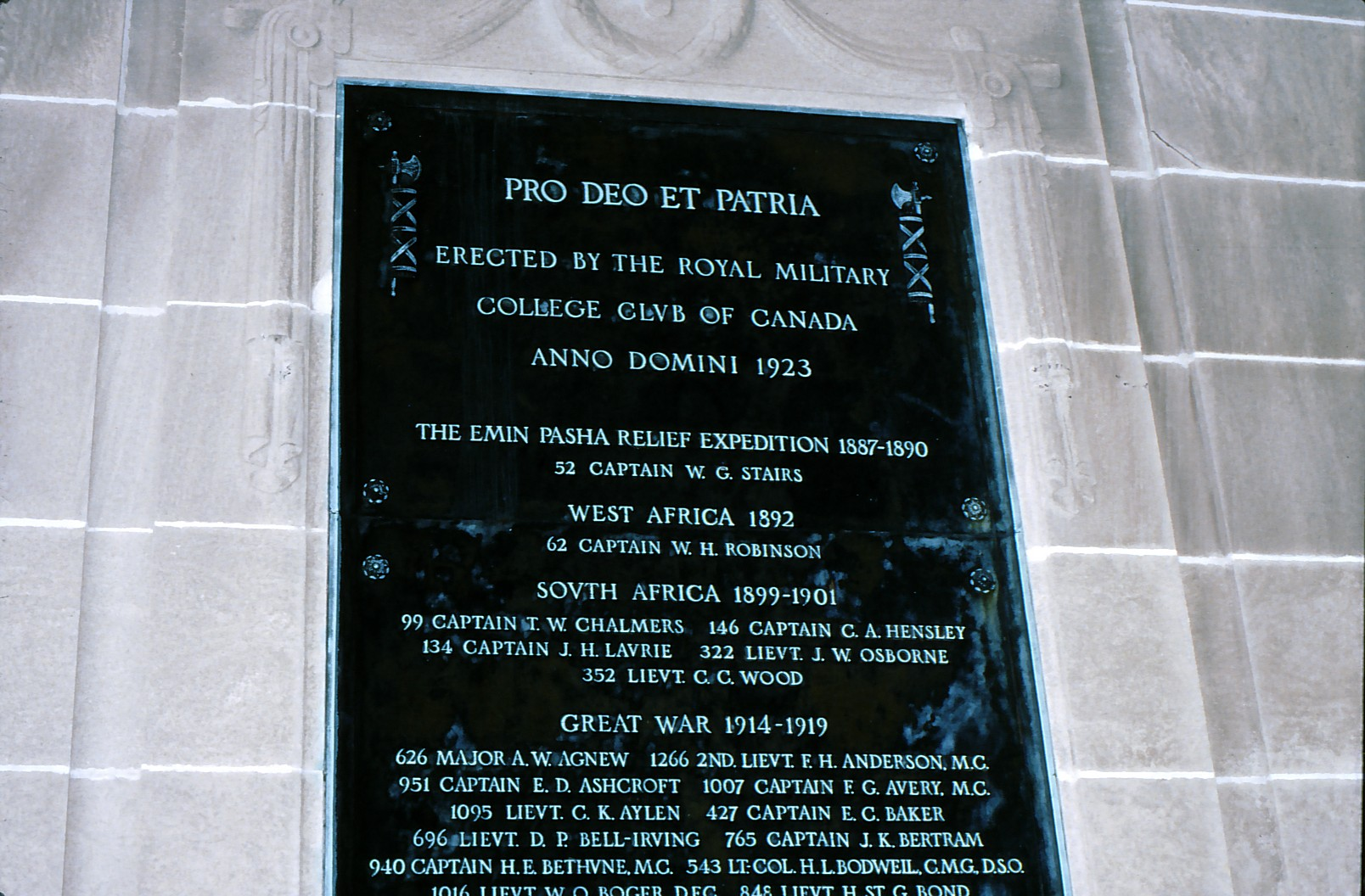
Laurie's son John Laurie Jr. listed on the Memorial Arch - Royal Military College of Canada

His oldest son, John Laurie Jr., was killed in the Second Boer War and is listed on the South African War Memorial in Halifax and the Memorial Arch at the Royal Military College of Canada. He was also the father of George Brenton Laurie, who was killed in World War One.

Mrs. Laurie, of Oakfield, Nova Scotia, returned to Nova Scotia after her husband died, while George was in WW1.

== Legacy ==
- built St. Margaret's of Scotland Church (See Heritage Trust of Nova Scotia)
- namesake of Laurie Park, Oakfield, Nova Scotia.

== electoral record ==
1887 Canadian federal election: Shelburne
Party	Candidate	Votes
Liberal	Thomas Robertson	1,194
Conservative	John Wimburn Laurie	1,160

By-election on 15 December 1887 On election being declared void, 9 November 1887
Party	Candidate	Votes
Conservative	John Wimburne Laurie	1,083
Liberal	Thomas Robertson	1,075

By-election on 22 October 1888 On election being declared void
Party	Candidate	Votes
Conservative	John Wimburne Laurie	987
Unknown	Congden	976

== See also ==
- Military history of Nova Scotia

Parliament of the United Kingdom
Preceded by Charles Allen	Member of Parliament for Pembroke and Haverfordwest; 1895 – 1906	Succeeded by Sir Owen Philipps
