= James McKay Harding =

Canadian politician (1926–1995)

James Harding

MLA for Shelburne County
- In office 1956–1970
- Preceded by: Wilfred Dauphinee
- Succeeded by: Harold Huskilson

Personal details
- Born: January 24, 1926 Jordan Falls, Nova Scotia
- Died: January 23, 1995 (aged 68)
- Party: Progressive Conservative
- Occupation: Politician

James McKay Harding (January 4, 1926 – January 23, 1995) was a political figure in Nova Scotia, Canada. He represented Shelburne County in the Nova Scotia House of Assembly from 1956 to 1970 as a Progressive Conservative member.
