= George Augustus Cox =

Canadian politician from Nova Scotia (1838–1925)

Member of the Nova Scotia House of Assembly for Shelburne
- In office January 12, 1904 – June 20, 1906

Member of the Legislative Council of Nova Scotia
- In office March 3, 1913 – April 25, 1925

Personal details
- Born: June 1, 1838 Shelburne, Nova Scotia
- Died: April 25, 1925 (aged 86) Shelburne, Nova Scotia
- Party: Liberal
- Spouse: Jane Purney
- Occupation: shipowner, merchant, politician

George Augustus Cox (June 1, 1838 – April 25, 1925) was a shipowner, merchant, and political figure in Nova Scotia, Canada. He represented Shelburne in the Nova Scotia House of Assembly from 1904 to 1906 as a Liberal member.

Cox was born in 1838 at Shelburne, Nova Scotia to James Cox and Elizabeth Holden. He married Jane Purney on February 2, 1864. Cox was elected in a by-election on January 12, 1904, after the death of Thomas Johnston; and did not contest the 1906 Nova Scotia general election. He was appointed to the Legislative Council of Nova Scotia on March 3, 1913, serving until his death in 1925. Cox died in 1925 at Shelburne, Nova Scotia.
