= Nathaniel Whitworth White =

Canadian politician

Nathaniel Whitworth White, KC (June 2, 1837 – October 31, 1916) was a lawyer and political figure in Nova Scotia, Canada. He represented Shelburne in the House of Commons of Canada from 1891 to 1896 and represented Shelburne County in the Nova Scotia House of Assembly from 1878 to 1882 as a Liberal-Conservative member.

He was born in Shelburne, Nova Scotia, the son of the Reverend Doctor White and grandson of Gideon White, and was educated there. He was called to the Nova Scotia bar in 1859. In 1860, he married Mary, the daughter of Joshua Snow; White married Fannie S. Dewolfe after the death of his first wife. In 1872, he was named Queen's Counsel. White served in the province's Executive Council from 1878 to 1882, when he ran unsuccessfully for a seat in the House of Commons. White was a governor for King's College in Windsor, Nova Scotia.

White had an uncle also named Nathaniel Whitworth White who was elected to the Nova Scotia Assembly for Shelburne in 1826; his election was later declared invalid after an appeal.

== Electoral record ==
1891 Canadian federal election: Shelburne
Party	Candidate	Votes
Liberal–Conservative	Nathaniel Whitworth White	1,388
Liberal	Thomas Robertson	1,369
