= Shelburne (federal electoral district) =

Former federal electoral district in Nova Scotia, Canada

Nova Scotia electoral district

Defunct federal electoral district
- Legislature: House of Commons
- District created: 1867
- District abolished: 1892
- First contested: 1867
- Last contested: 1891

Demographics
- Census division(s): Shelburne

Shelburne was a federal electoral district in the province of Nova Scotia, Canada, that was represented in the House of Commons of Canada from 1867 to 1896.

It was created by the British North America Act, 1867. It consisted of the County of Shelburne. It was abolished in 1892 when it was merged into Shelburne and Queen's riding.

== Members of Parliament ==
This riding elected the following members of Parliament:

Parliament	Years	Member	Party
Shelburne
1st	1867–1869	Thomas Coffin	Anti-Confederation
1st	1869–1872	Thomas Coffin	Liberal–Conservative
2nd	1872–1873	Thomas Coffin	Liberal–Conservative
2nd	1873–1874	Thomas Coffin	Liberal
3rd	1874–1878	Thomas Coffin	Liberal
4th	1878–1882	Thomas Robertson	Liberal
5th	1882–1887	Thomas Robertson	Liberal
6th	1887–1887	Thomas Robertson	Liberal
6th	1887–1888	John Wimburn Laurie	Conservative
6th	1888–1891	John Wimburn Laurie	Conservative
7th	1891–1896	Nathaniel Whitworth White	Liberal–Conservative
Riding dissolved into Shelburne and Queen's

== Election results ==
1867 Canadian federal election
Party	Candidate	Votes
Anti-Confederation	Thomas Coffin	acclaimed
Source: Canadian Elections Database

1872 Canadian federal election
Party	Candidate	Votes
Liberal–Conservative	Thomas Coffin	acclaimed
Source: Canadian Elections Database

By-election on 9 December 1873 On Mr. Coffin being appointed Receiver-General of Canada, 7 November 1873
Party	Candidate	Votes
Liberal	Thomas Coffin	acclaimed

1874 Canadian federal election
Party	Candidate	Votes
Liberal	Thomas Coffin	acclaimed
lop.parl.ca

1878 Canadian federal election
Party	Candidate	Votes
Liberal	Thomas Robertson	966
Unknown	Robert W. Freeman	899
Liberal	Thomas Coffin	198

1882 Canadian federal election
Party	Candidate	Votes
Liberal	Thomas Robertson	912
Unknown	N.W. White	775

1887 Canadian federal election
Party	Candidate	Votes
Liberal	Thomas Robertson	1,194
Conservative	John Wimburn Laurie	1,160

By-election on 15 December 1887 On election being declared void, 9 November 1887
Party	Candidate	Votes
Conservative	John Wimburne Laurie	1,083
Liberal	Thomas Robertson	1,075

By-election on 22 October 1888 On election being declared void
Party	Candidate	Votes
Conservative	John Wimburne Laurie	987
Unknown	Congden	976

1891 Canadian federal election
Party	Candidate	Votes
Liberal–Conservative	Nathaniel Whitworth White	1,388
Liberal	Thomas Robertson	1,369

== See also ==
- List of Canadian electoral districts
- Historical federal electoral districts of Canada
