= Carlos Scott Lopez-Gelormino =

Carlos Scott López
- López in 2008
- Born: 11 April 1970 (age 56); US
- Citizenship: Multiple—Australia, Canada, United Kingdom, and United States
- Education: Harvard University; Yale University; University of New South Wales
- Awards: Fulbright Fellowship (2005); Truman Fellowship (1989)
- Scientific career
- Fields: Epidemiology/public health, clinical psychology, psychotropics, and law
- Website: www.gamelancouncil.org

Carlos Scott López (Lopez-Gelormino; April 11, 1970) is an American-born clinical psychologist, human rights attorney, and public health advocate who has focused his career on studying, addressing, and treating trauma among vulnerable and marginalized groups - and specifically LGBTQ+ and Latino individuals. He worked with attorney Bruce William Nickerson until Nickerson's death on February 5, 2022.

== Education ==
López received an AB with honors from Harvard University; a JD from Yale Law School with foci in public health and international human rights; and an MPsych and PhD from the University of New South Wales in clinical psychology with a focus in psychotraumatology and neurospsychology. He returned to graduate school at the UC Davis School of Medicine (the medical school associated with the Davis Campus of the University of California) pursuing an MD with an interest in psychedelic psychiatry, complementing his doctoral research in cross-cultural trauma and long-standing work in the entheogen and psychedelic medicine spaces. Currently, he is on leave from these studies addressing personal, familial, and vocational commitments.

== Career ==
As a clinical psychologist (licensed in Australia) and attorney admitted to the New York Bar, California Bar, and U.S. Patent Bar, López has affiliated himself with attorneys addressing public health, pro bono, and international development projects. In California, López worked closely with Bruce William Nickerson on a wide variety of anti-discrimination cases focused on the illegitimate—and illegal—criminal prosecution of LGBTQ people with a focus on addressing the trauma and psychological ailments which such clients faced.

López's focus on the cross-cultural dimensions of trauma and PTSD, public health/epidemiology, immigration, and alternative dispute resolution (particularly mediation and arbitration) emerged in the early 1990s after teaching negotiation techniques at Harvard Law School with the late Prof. Roger Fisher, and assisting repatriated refugees as an officer with the United Nations Transitional Authority in Cambodia (UNTAC).

== Publications ==
In the early 2000s, López served as an Executive Editor of the Yale Human Rights & Development Law Journal, as well as an Editor of the Yale Journal of Law and Health and the Yale International Law Journal. In addition to writings and submissions in the context of his day-to-day work, López's scholarly, formal publications include articles addressing human rights; public health; intellectual property; and immigration law.

== Critics ==
Given López's critical and comparatively progressive stance towards public health rights, the fluidity of cross-cultural therapeutic psychological techniques, and complex dimensions of assessing stigma – particularly vis-à-vis psychedelic / entheogenic medicines and HIV-AIDS – he has been viewed as overly idealistic. His ideas about decriminalized plant-based medicines, future political organizations, consultative community-based law reform, and the natural transformation of nation-states into a global, unified federation of libertarian municipalities have also been considered somewhat naive. López has countered that such developments will take time, and he has a very long-term time horizon, citing the German economist E. F. Schumacher as one of his leading inspirations.
