= Nickelsen =

Nickelsen is a surname. Notable people with this surname include:

- Ellin Nickelsen (born 1956), prize-winning poet in the Föhr North Frisian language
- Garrett Nickelsen, American rock musician, bassist for The Maine (band)
- Kärin Nickelsen (born 1972), German historian of science
- John R. Nickelsen, American politician, member of 32nd Oregon Legislative Assembly
- Josef Nickelsen, Norwegian architect of 1914 Jubilee Exhibition
- Rasmus Nickelsen, Danish swimmer, competed in Swimming at the 2019 European Youth Summer Olympic Festival
- Steinar Nickelsen (born 1978), Norwegian jazz musician
- Wilhelm Nickelsen, Norwegian bridge player, founder of a predecessor organization to the Norwegian Bridge Federation

== See also ==
- Nicolson
- Nicholson (surname)
