= Frank E. Smith (Nova Scotia politician) =

Canadian politician from Nova Scotia (20th century))

Member of the Nova Scotia House of Assembly for Shelburne
- In office July 27, 1920 – August 11, 1920

Personal details
- Party: Liberal

Frank E. Smith (unknown – unknown) was a political figure in Nova Scotia, Canada. He was elected to represent Shelburne in the Nova Scotia House of Assembly in 1920 as a Liberal member.

Smith was elected in the 1920 Nova Scotia general election but resigned his seat on August 11, 1920, before the House met, in order to allow cabinet member Ernest Howard Armstrong, the Commissioner of Public Works and Mines, to contest the seat after being defeated in Yarmouth County.
