= Wilfred Dauphinee =

Canadian politician

MLA for Shelburne County
- In office 1941–1956
- Preceded by: Henry R. L. Bill
- Succeeded by: James McKay Harding

Personal details
- Born: August 14, 1910 Shelburne, Nova Scotia
- Died: July 11, 2007 (aged 96) Nepean, Ontario
- Party: Liberal
- Occupation: Politician

Wilfred Tennyson Dauphinee (August 14, 1910 – July 11, 2007) was a quarry operator and political figure in Nova Scotia, Canada. He represented Shelburne in the Nova Scotia House of Assembly from 1941 to 1956 as a Liberal member.

He was born in Shelburne, Nova Scotia, the son of Alfred Tennyson Dauphinee and Florence Martha Ernst. He was educated at the Shelburne Academy, Dalhousie University and Acadia University. In 1937, he married Helen Louise Coffin. Dauphinee served on the town council for Shelburne. He was Minister of Trade and Industry in the province's Executive Council from 1950 to 1953. Dauphinee died in Nepean, Ontario.
