= Lyra B. Nickerson =

American philanthropist (1886–1916)

Lyra Brown Nickerson (1886–1916) was an American philanthropist, and one of the wealthiest and most popular members of society in the U.S. state of Rhode Island. Her grandfather, Joseph R. Brown, formed a partnership with Lucian Sharpe in 1853, creating Brown & Sharpe. Brown & Sharpe was one of the best-known and most influential machine tool builders and was a leading manufacturer of instruments for machinists (such as micrometers and indicators). He left his interest in his company to his daughter, Lyra F. Brown, of his second wife, Jane Francis Brown.

== Early life ==
Lyra B. Nickerson was born on 7 December 1886 at her winter home, 71 Angell Street, Providence, Rhode Island. She was the only child of Edward I. Nickerson and Lyra F. Brown. Miss Nickerson's parents often travelled, and their daughter spent part of her early life visiting Europe with them. She had tutors at home, and she graduated the Lincoln School in 1904.

== Military aviation ==
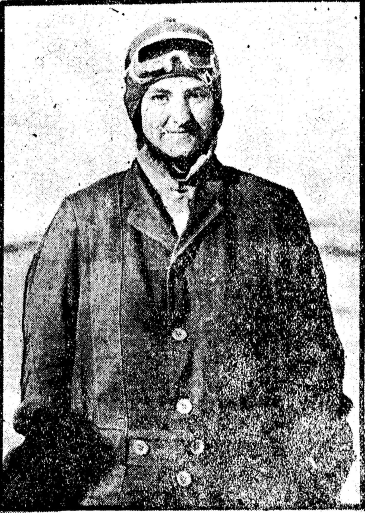
Lyra B. Nickerson, just after flight between Quonset and Fort Greble. Lyra B. Nickerson and Roderich W. Wright, an Aeroplane Instructor, Seated In Machine Preparatory to a Fllght (19 July 1916) The Sturtevant Model S climbing with Lyra B. Nickerson in the observation seat and Mr. Wright at the Wheel.

Nickerson was concerned about the military and political disinterest in aeronautics in the United States. She donated funds to The American National Aeroplane Fund of the Aero Club of America. The purpose of The American National Aeroplane Fund was to train aviators, provide aviation corps for the National Guard and Navy Militia of the States, and put airplanes in use for the mail carrying service to inaccessible places, forming an aeronautical reserve, which while being used daily for peaceful purposes shall be ready for military service in case of need. In October 2015, she contributed $7500 to the funds of the Aero Club of America for an airplane. The Aero Club instituted a plan on developing an aviation corps for the naval militia or National Guard. At the suggestion of Nickerson, the Club gave the plane to the Rhode Island National Guard.

Editorial (23 July 1916)

Rhode Island, First to Provide Its Naval Militia With Hydroaeroplane, Should Take Pride in Furnishing Proper Equipment for the Corps.

To the Editor of the Sunday Journal,

I had the pleasure of making a flight last Wednesday in Rhode Island's new seaplane, which weighs 2150 pounds and is 48 feet and 8 inches spread. She has an eight-cylinder, 140 horse-power motor, which makes 2250 revolutions a minute, and has a speed of 80 miles an hour, her fuselage is made of steel.

It is interesting to note that the Rhode Island Aeronautic Corps has the first seaplane of its kind under operation in the naval militia service, and has been given the No. 1. It is the only plane over which the Government at the present time has any control. There are some which have been sent on approval to Pensacola, but at present they have not been accepted.

Rhode Island is the smallest State in the country, and has the distinction of owning the first seaplane. She should be patriotic enough to at least assist in the equipment of this corps of 28 picked men, who are enthusiastic enough to give their time and brains for the relatively small pay involved.

The money subscribed in this State last winter will be barely sufficient to pay for the two hangars and the salaries of the mechanics and instructors required, after deducting the cost of the machines themselves. Some equipment, like ropes, buckles, gasoline tanks and the like, have been purchased, but more remains to be done before both detachments are completely outfitted. For example, the men of the corps are without rubber boots, and in launching the seaplane, or bringing it ashore, are nor wading out in ordinary clothes.

The Rhode Island Legislature was asked last winter for an appropriation of $3000 to supplement the approximately $23,000 contributed by private citizens. This request, although made by the Governor and the Adjutant General, was refused. Shall we permit this important work to suffer in consequence of such neglect?

These fine men have practically volunteered their services. Are there no sufficiently patriotic people here to assist in the maintenance of the Rhode Island Aeronautic Corps?

LYRA BROWN NICKERSON

Narragansett Pier, July 21.

== Philanthropy ==
Nickerson inherited $6 million after the death of her parents and became noted as a philanthropist. She donated her father's architectural library to the Providence Public Library, where it now forms the core of the Nickerson Art and Architecture Collection. There were 700 volumes in the collection. On 1 June 1908, she gave $10,000 to the Providence Public Library, declaring that her action was aimed to carry out the expressed wishes of her father.

This was followed by financial gifts to both the library and the Rhode Island School of Design. Upon her death, her remaining estate was divided between the Providence Public Library and the Rhode Island School of Design. The latter bequest included several pieces of artwork, including two portraits of her father. The earlier of these was painted in 1885 by Gerald Sinclair Hayward. The latter is part of a pair of portraits posthumously commissioned in 1909 by Nickerson of her parents from Albert Edward Jackson.

== Personal life ==
Nickerson inherited her grandfather's wealth at 20 years of age when her mother died on 13 July 1907. Her father died less than a year later, 15 March 1908. She continued to travel frequently after her parents' death. She was in Germany when World War I started and had difficulty returning to the United States.

On 3 August 1916, Nickerson announced her engagement to Henry G. Clark, assistant director of Athletics at Brown University; the date for the wedding was set as 4 October 1916.

== Death ==
On 30 August 1916, Nickerson died of typhoid at her summer home at Narragansett Pier. At the time of her death, Henry G. Clark (fiancé), Jane Brown Jones (cousin), Dr. Lord of Boston, Dr. Charles Hitchcock of New York and Narragansett Pier, two nurses, and William H. Buffum were present. Her secretary, Kathryn Cocroft, was also there. Dr. Hitchcock believed Nickerson caught typhoid during an automobile trip through New England.
