= Dr. George W. Carr House =

Historic house in Rhode Island, United States

- U.S. National Register of Historic Places
- U.S. National Historic Landmark District – Contributing property
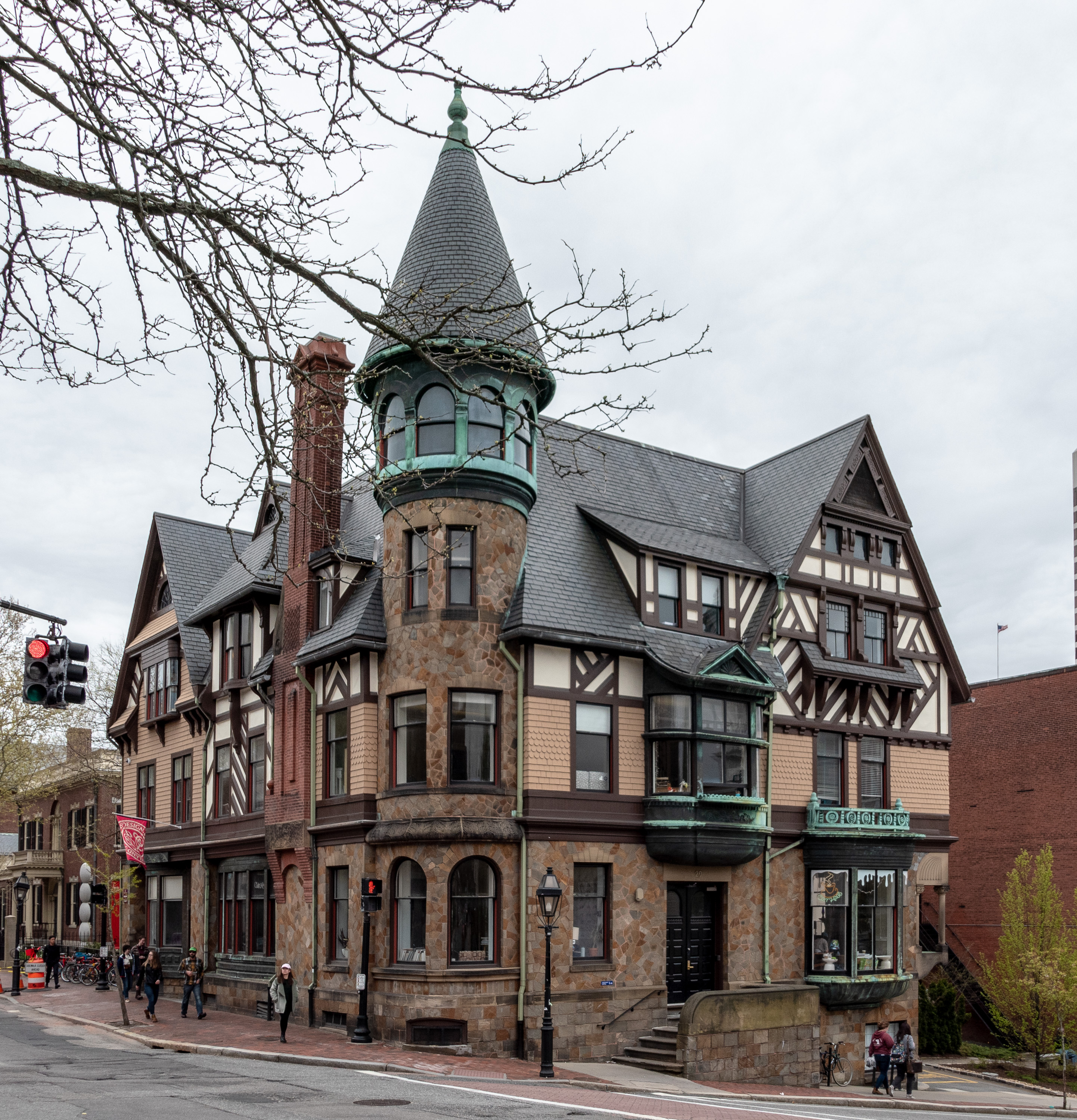
- Dr. George W. Carr House

- Location within Rhode Island Location within the United States
- Location: Providence, Rhode Island
- Coordinates: 41.82709°N 71.40759°W
- Built: 1885
- Architect: Edward I. Nickerson
- Architectural style: Queen Anne
- Part of: College Hill Historic District (ID70000019)
- NRHP reference No.: 73000067

Significant dates
- Added to NRHP: March 7, 1973
- Designated NHLDCP: November 10, 1970

The Dr. George W. Carr House, also known simply as Carr House, is a historic house at 29 Waterman Street in the College Hill neighborhood of Providence, Rhode Island. The Queen Anne style house was built in 1885 by Edward I. Nickerson and added to the National Register of Historic Places in 1973.

The building was purchased by the Rhode Island School of Design (RISD) in 1916, and has served a variety of roles for the school, most recently as a student cafe named Carr Haus and lounge at RISD. It is one of Providence's early prominent examples of Queen Anne styling. The house is built on a steep slope and located at the corner of a busy intersection of Waterman Street and Benefit Street.

In 1916, the Providence Engineering Society occupied the entire second floor of the building, then owned by RISD. In 1926, artist Frank Convers Mathewson (1862–1941) lived in the Carr House.

According to Chris Frantz of the band Talking Heads, while students at RISD, the band members lived in Carr House and that is where they wrote their song "Psycho Killer".

== See also ==
- National Register of Historic Places listings in Providence, Rhode Island
