= Kärin Nickelsen =

German historian of science (born 1972)

Kärin Nickelsen (born 1972) is a German historian of science whose works have included books on eighteenth-century botanical illustration, photosynthesis, and life-support systems for human spaceflight. She is a professor at LMU Munich.

== Education and career ==
Nickelsen earned a diploma at the University of Göttingen in 1999, and completed her Ph.D. in 2002 at the University of Bern in Switzerland. She became an assistant professor at the University of Bern, was promoted to associate professor in 2006, and completed a habilitation there in 2010. In 2011, she took her present position as professor for the History of Science at LMU Munich.

== Books ==
Nickelsen is the author of:

- Draughtsmen, Botanists and Nature: The Construction of Eighteenth-Century Botanical Illustrations (Springer, 2006)
- The Maximum Quantum Yield Controversy: Otto Warburg and the "Midwest-Gang" (with Govindjee, Bern Studies in the History and Philosophy of Science, 2011)
- Explaining Photosynthesis: Models of Biochemical Mechanisms, 1840–1960 (Springer, 2015)
- Far Beyond the Moon: A History of Life Support Systems in the Space Age (with David P. D. Munns, University of Pittsburgh Press, 2020)

== Recognition ==
Nickelsen won the Dalberg Prize in 2010, and became a member of the German National Academy of Sciences Leopoldina in 2011. She was elected to the Academia Europaea in 2020.
