= Norman Emmons Smith =

Canadian politician from Nova Scotia (1880–1969)

Member of the Nova Scotia House of Assembly for Shelburne
- In office June 25, 1925 – September 30, 1928

Personal details
- Born: February 26, 1880 Woods Harbour, Nova Scotia
- Died: February 17, 1969 (aged 88) Wolfville, Nova Scotia
- Party: Liberal Conservative
- Spouse: Vera Adelaide Nickerson
- Occupation: ship captain, politician

Norman Emmons Smith (February 26, 1880 – February 17, 1969) was a ship captain and political figure in Nova Scotia, Canada. He represented Shelburne in the Nova Scotia House of Assembly from 1925 to 1928 as a Liberal Conservative member.

Smith was born in 1880 at Woods Harbour, Nova Scotia to Isaiah Smith and Sarah Elizabeth Morrisey. He married Vera Adelaide Nickerson on July 17, 1900. Smith died in 1969 at Wolfville, Nova Scotia.

He was elected in the 1925 Nova Scotia general election but was unsuccessful in the 1928 and 1937 Nova Scotia general elections.
