= Edward I. Nickerson =

American architect

Edward Irving Nickerson
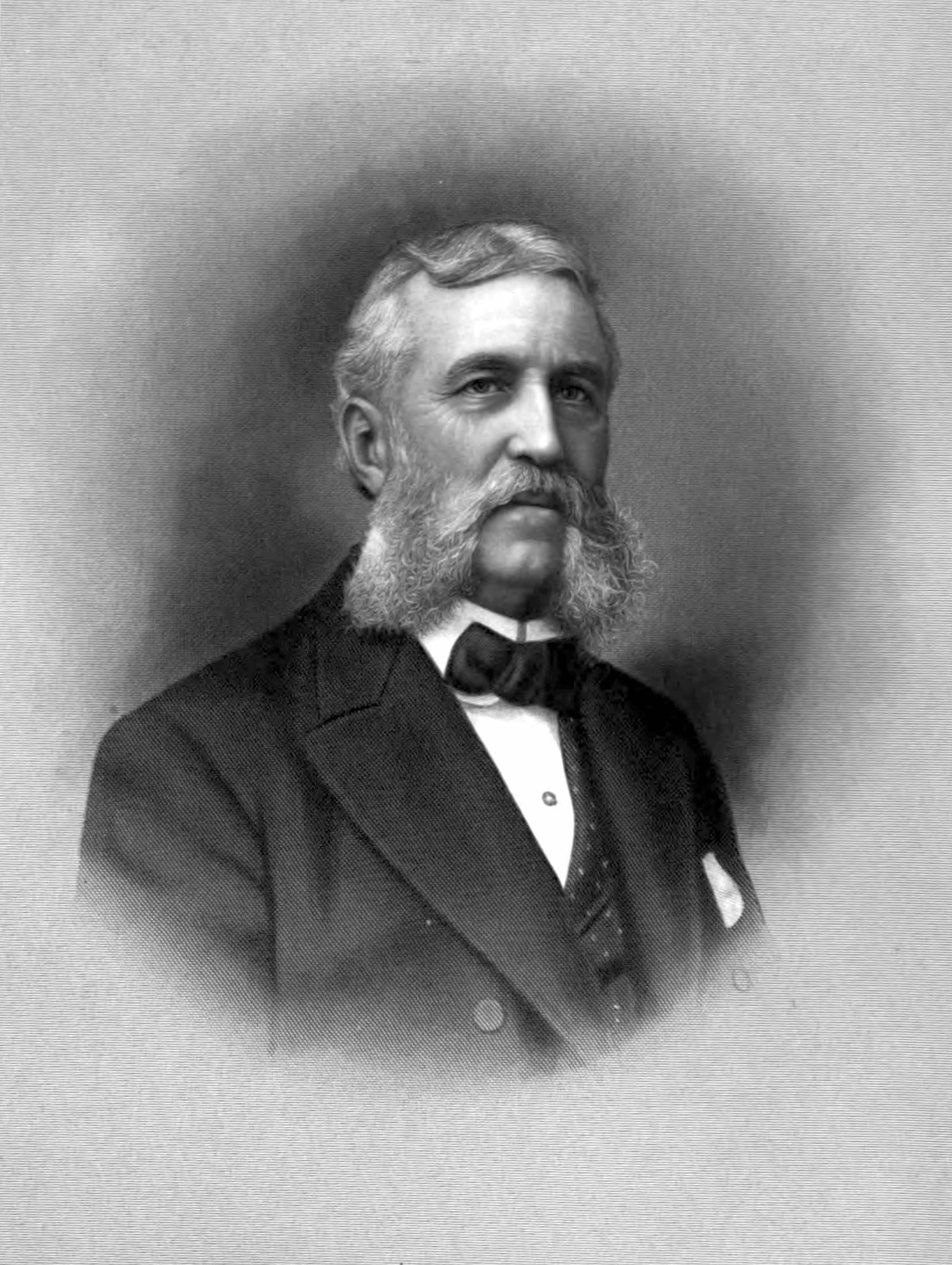
- Edward I. Nickerson, architect
- Born: September 13, 1845; Pawtucket, Rhode Island
- Died: March 15, 1908 (aged 62); Providence, Rhode Island
- Occupation: Architect

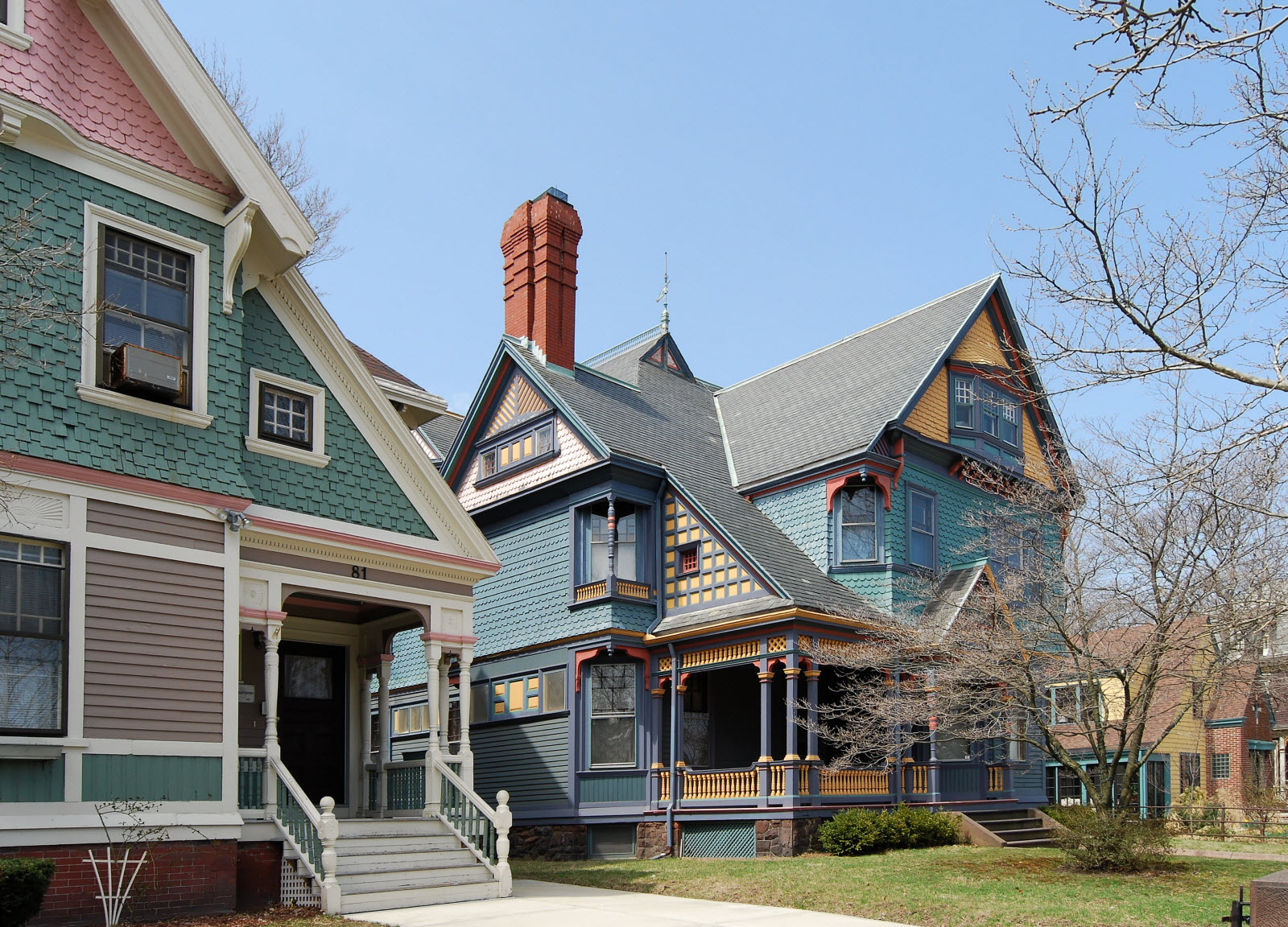
The houses of Joseph C. Hartshorn (left) and Frederick W. Hartwell (right), both designed by Nickerson in 1883 and completed in 1884.

Edward I. Nickerson (1845–1908) was an American architect from Providence, Rhode Island, known for his work in the Queen Anne style in Providence.

== Life and career ==
Edward Irving Nickerson was born September 13, 1845, in Pawtucket, Rhode Island, to Sparrow Howes Nickerson and Elizabeth Clarke (Darling) Nickerson. He was educated in the local schools until circa 1862, when he left to study architecture in the office of Clifton A. Hall. After several years working in Hall's office, in 1871 Nickerson opened an office of his own. After several years of practice, in 1877 Nickerson closed his practice and left for Europe with his wife, where they undertook a Grand Tour. They did not return to the United States until 1881, after which Nickerson reestablished his practice.

During his career Nickerson was chiefly known as an architect of large suburban houses in and around Providence. Designing chiefly in an ornate Queen Anne style, in his lifetime his unique houses were locally referred to as "Nickersonian." He practiced until his death, though he scaled back his practice significantly during the last decade of his life. Most of Nickerson's houses were designed for the city's manufacturers and merchants.

Nickerson joined the American Institute of Architects as a Fellow in 1875, and the same year was a founding member of the Rhode Island chapter. He served two terms as secretary and four terms as president of the chapter. In 1889 he was secretary of the AIA convention of that year, at which the Western Association of Architects was merged into the AIA. He was a long-time trustee of the Providence Public Library, sitting on the board from 1878 until his death.

== Personal life ==
In 1873 Nickerson married Lyra Frances Brown, youngest daughter of Joseph Rogers Brown, who had cofounded Brown & Sharpe in 1833. The Brown family money allowed the Nickersons to travel abroad extensively and frequently. They had one daughter, Lyra Brown, in 1885. Lyra Frances died July 13, 1907, in Providence, followed by Edward Irving on March 15, 1908.

Nickerson's home, 71 Angell Street, is now Larned House of the Rhode Island School of Design.

== Legacy ==
After the death of her parents Lyra B. Nickerson became noted as a philanthropist, both in executing her father's will and on her own account. She donated her father's his large architectural library to the Providence Public Library, where it now forms the core of the Nickerson Art and Architecture Collection. This was followed by financial gifts to both the library and the Rhode Island School of Design. Nickerson was interested in flying, and donated funds to the Aero Club of America and Rhode Island National Guard for the purchase of airplanes, and learned to fly herself. Upon her death, which occurred August 30, 1916 in Narragansett, her remaining estate was divided between the Providence Public Library and the Rhode Island School of Design. The latter bequest included several pieces of artwork, including two portraits of her father. The earlier of these was painted in 1885 by Gerald Sinclair Hayward. The latter is part of a pair of portraits posthumously commissioned in 1909 by Lyra Brown Nickerson of her parents from Albert Edward Jackson.

At least one of Nickerson's works has been listed independently on the United States National Register of Historic Places, and many others are contributing properties to listed historic districts.

== Works ==
- Miller Block and Spencer Block, Roosevelt Ave and Main St, Pawtucket, Rhode Island (1873 and 1874, demolished)
- Cottage for Joseph U. Starkweather, 26 Nayatt Rd, Barrington, Rhode Island (1882)
- House for Seth H. Brownell, (Note: Originally located at the 268 Broadway, the current site of the Columbus Theatre, and moved to make way for it. The house is within the bounds of the Broadway-Armory Historic District, listed on the National Register of Historic Places in 1974, but is not mentioned in the inventory.) 57 Vernon St, Providence, Rhode Island (1882)
- House for William H. Crins, (Note: A contributing property to the Pine Street Historic District, listed on the National Register of Historic Places in 1978.) 24 Linden St, Providence, Rhode Island (1882)
- House for George W. Whitford, (Note: A contributing property to the College Hill Historic District, listed on the National Register of Historic Places in 1970.) 48 Barnes St, Providence, Rhode Island (1882)
- House for Joseph C. Hartshorn, (Note: A contributing property to the Broadway–Armory Historic District, listed on the National Register of Historic Places in 1974.) 81 Parade St, Providence, Rhode Island (1883)
- House for Frederick W. Hartwell, 77 Parade St, Providence, Rhode Island (1883–84)
- House for Walter E. Richmond, (Note: A contributing property to the Hope–Power–Cooke Streets Historic District, listed on the National Register of Historic Places in 1973.) 163 Waterman St, Providence, Rhode Island (1883)
- Double house for Edward S. Aldrich, 34 Barnes and 199 Brown Sts, Providence, Rhode Island (1884)
- House for George W. Whitford, 54 Barnes St, Providence, Rhode Island (1884)
- Beneficent Congregational Church chapel, (Note: A contributing property to the Downtown Providence Historic District, listed on the National Register of Historic Places in 1985.) (Note: The chapel is presently used as a meeting space and known as the Round Top Center.) 300 Weybosset St, Providence, Rhode Island (1885)
- Grace Memorial Home, 133 Delaine St, Providence, Rhode Island (1885, burned 1959)
- House for George W. Carr, 29 Waterman St, Providence, Rhode Island (1885, NRHP 1973)
- Providence Art Club, (Note: For the Providence Art Club, Nickerson with artist Sydney Richmond Burleigh and collector Isaac C. Bates remodeled the interiors of a brick house built in 1791 for Seril Dodge in the Queen Anne style.) 11 Thomas St, Providence, Rhode Island (1886–87)
- Double house for Jane S. Hammond, (Note: Now Clark Alumni House of the Wheeler School.) 29 and 31 Cabot St, Providence, Rhode Island (1887)
- House for Newton D. Arnold, (Note: A contributing property to the Stimson Avenue Historic District, listed on the National Register of Historic Places in 1973.) 24 Stimson Ave, Providence, Rhode Island (1888)
- House for George Wilkinson, (Note: A contributing property to the Elmwood Historic District, listed on the National Register of Historic Places in 1980.) 153 Ontario St, Providence, Rhode Island (1888)
- House for Stephen A. Cooke Jr., 158 Bowen St, Providence, Rhode Island (1889)
- House for John D. Lewis, 134 Brown St, Providence, Rhode Island (1891)
- House for Frank H. Maynard, (Note: A contributing property to the Wayland Historic District, listed on the National Register of Historic Places in 2005.) 420 Angell St, Providence, Rhode Island (1891)
- House for Almena I. Kern, 148 Melrose St, Providence, Rhode Island (1893)
- "Miramar" for Joshua Wilbour, (Note: A contributing property to the Bristol Waterfront Historic District, listed on the National Register of Historic Places in 1975.) 217 Hope St, Bristol, Rhode Island (1893)
- House for Jesse W. Coleman, (Note: A contributing property to the Blackstone Park Historic District, listed on the National Register of Historic Places in 1998.) 272 President Ave, Providence, Rhode Island (1894)
- House for Charles H. Sprague, 44 Stimson Ave, Providence, Rhode Island (1894)
- House for George W. Williams, 26 Sycamore St, Providence, Rhode Island (1895)
- House for John E. Camfield, 349 Hope St, Providence, Rhode Island (1896–97)
- House for B. Thomas Potter, 8 Stimson Ave, Providence, Rhode Island (1897)

== Gallery of works ==
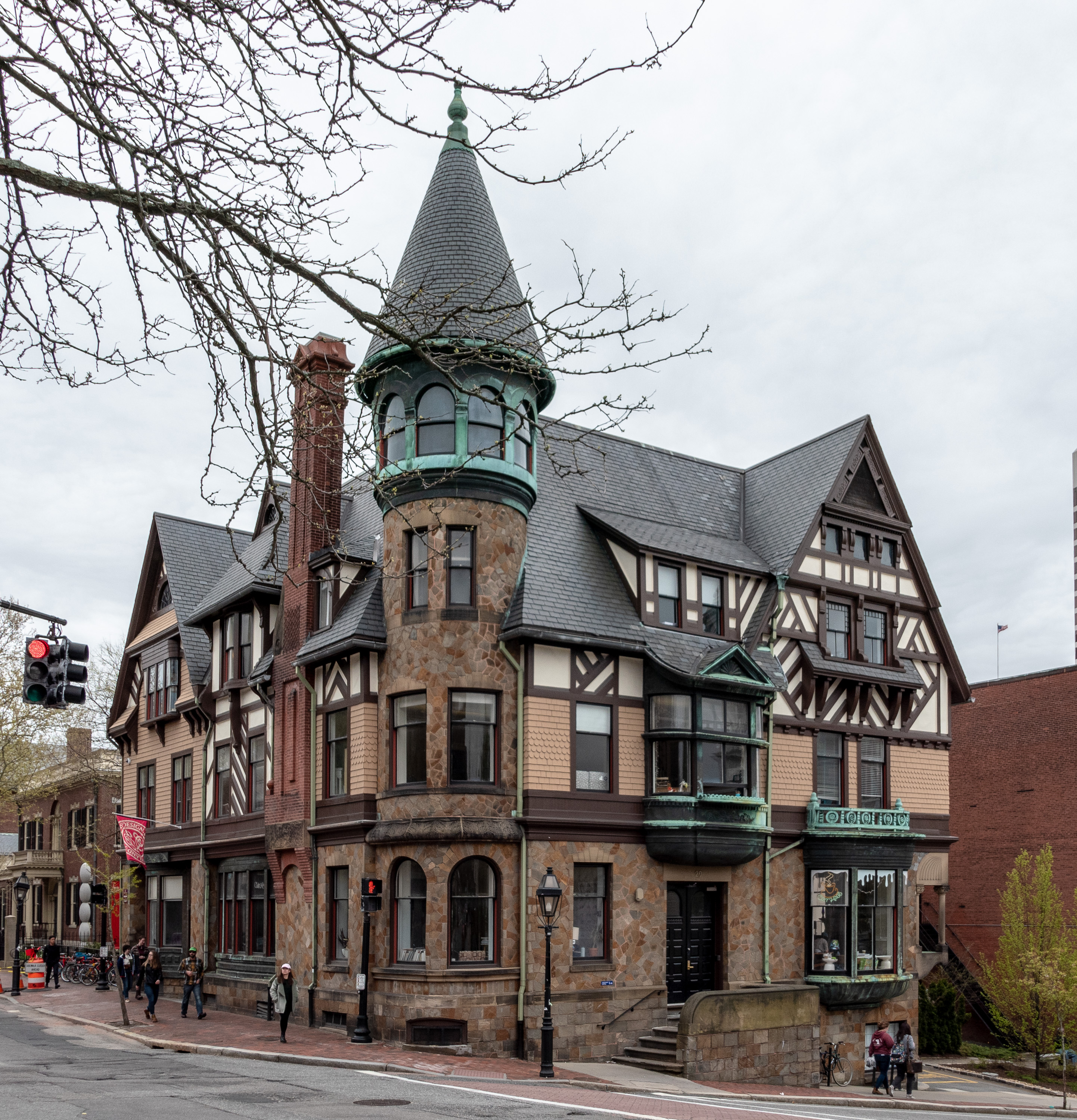
House for George W. Carr, Providence, Rhode Island, 1885.

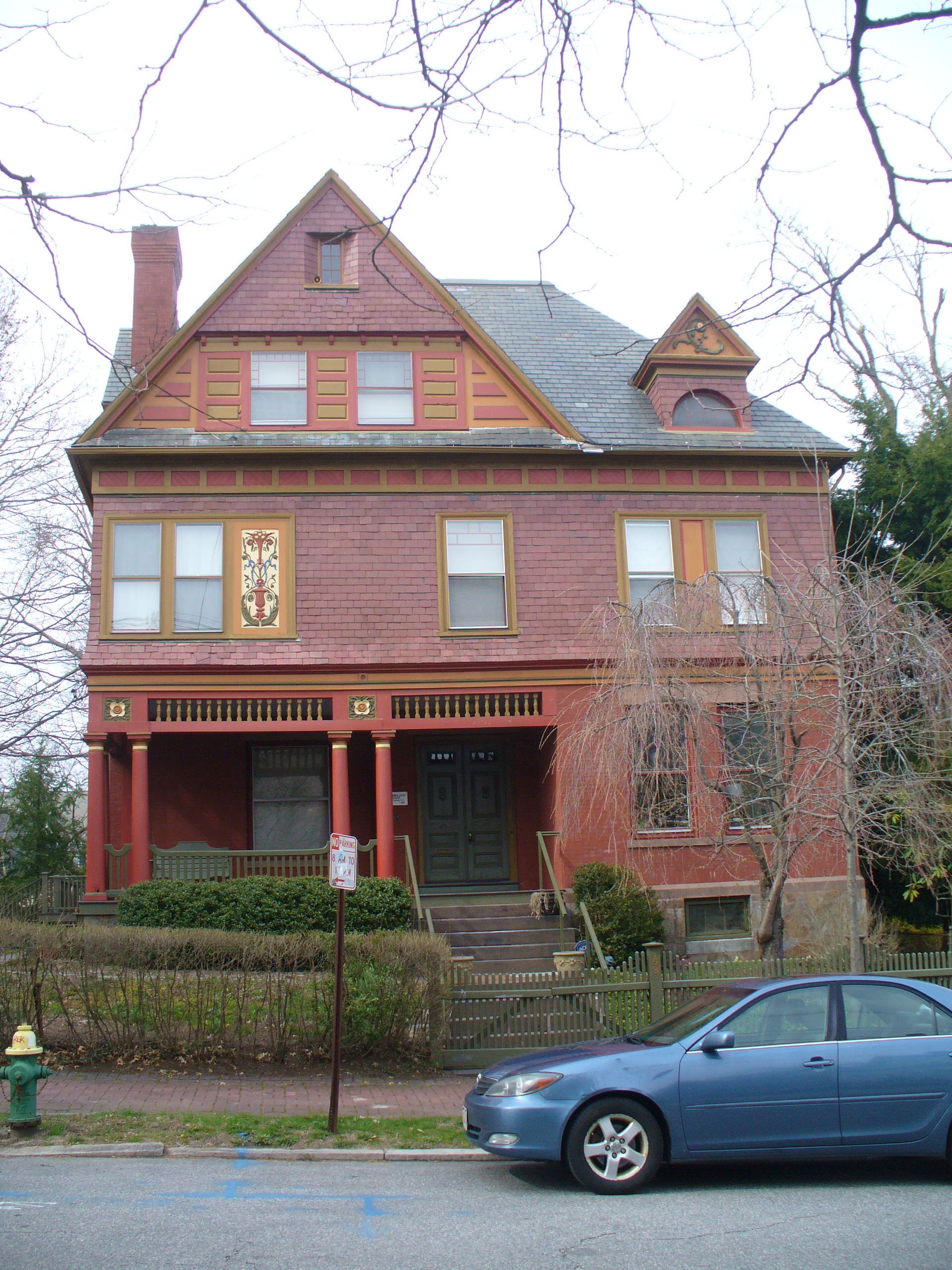
House for Stephen A. Cooke Jr., Providence, Rhode Island, 1889.
