= Oakfield, Nova Scotia =

Community in Nova Scotia, Canada

Coordinates: 44°53′51.9″N 63°34′57.9″W

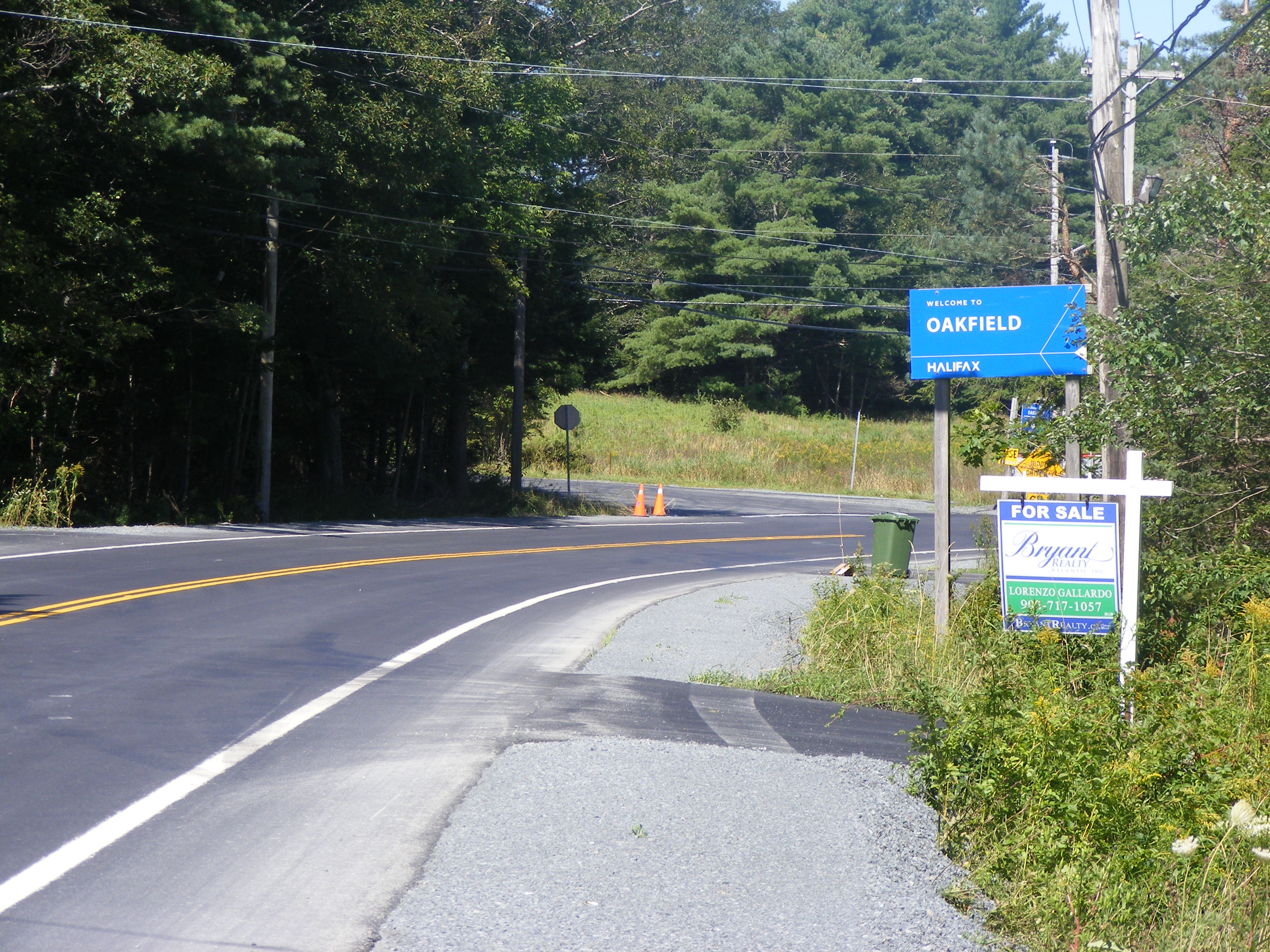
Oakfield, August 2023.

Oakfield in Nova Scotia

Oakfield is a community of the Halifax Regional Municipality in the Canadian province of Nova Scotia. The community was founded and named by John Wimburn Laurie. He built St. Margaret's of Scotland Church and is the namesake of Laurie Park. He arrived in Canada in 1861. In 1865 he purchased 800 acres in Oakfield. He brought twenty families from England.

== Parks ==
- Laurie Provincial Park
- Oakfield Provincial Park
