= Moses H. Nickerson =

Canadian politician (1844–1943)

Moses Hardy Nickerson (September 10, 1844 – March 23, 1943) was a journalist, poet and political figure in Nova Scotia, Canada. He represented Shelburne County in the Nova Scotia House of Assembly from 1902 to 1911 as a Liberal member.

He was born in Newellton, Shelburne County, Nova Scotia, the son of Phineas Nickerson and Jane Smith. In 1868, Nickerson married Mary E. Duncan. Nickerson was a school teacher for 15 years, a court interpreter and the editor of the Cape Sable Advertiser. He was first elected to the provincial assembly in a 1902 by-election held after the death of Thomas Robertson. He was the author of Songs of Summerland and Carols of the Coast. He also published some poetry under the pen name "Thomas Cod". Nickerson helped found the Fisherman's Union of Nova Scotia in 1905. He died in Melrose, Massachusetts at the age of 96.

His son Maurice also served in the provincial assembly.
