= Bruce William Nickerson =

American activist

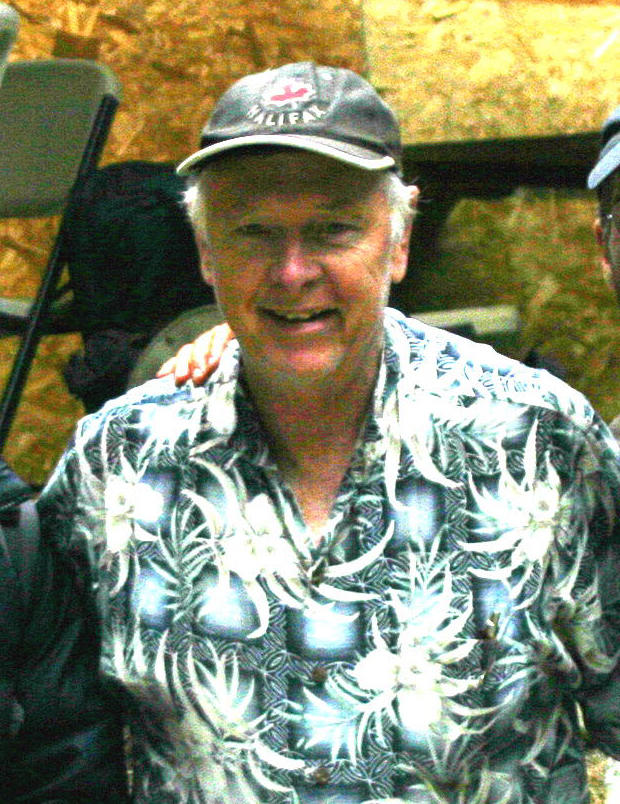
- Nickerson in August 2007
- Born: June 21, 1941; Modesto, California, U.S.
- Died: February 5, 2022 (aged 80); Redwood City, California, U.S.
- Education: Stanford University; Golden Gate University
- Occupation: Attorney
- Years active: 1975–2022
- Known for: LGBTQ rights
- Spouses: Billie Fay Sommerfeld (m. 1963; div. 1967); Donna Gene Barnsley (m. 1980; div. 1987); Rhonda Dodd (m. 2015; died 2015)
- Partner: Carlos Scott López (cp. 2018)
- Children: 2

Bruce William Nickerson (June 21, 1941 – February 5, 2022) was an American civil rights and gay rights attorney in California. He was also an authority on lewd conduct law in the United States. Nickerson operated a solo legal practice in San Carlos, California, and was affiliated with Carlos Scott Lopez-Gelormino, a clinical psychologist and human rights attorney.

== Biography ==
Nickerson attended Modesto High School in Modesto, California. He received an A.B. in Economics, with honors, from Stanford University and a Doctor of Jurisprudence from Golden Gate University.

Nickerson operated a solo legal practice after passing the California Bar, and often affiliated himself with attorneys addressing civil rights issues and lewd conduct cases. His focus on lewd conduct emerged after pursuing several cases addressing such conduct and freedom of speech issues at adult bookstores in the early 1980s in and around the San Francisco Bay Area. Nickerson successfully argued Baluyut v. Superior Court, (1996) 12 Cal.4th 826, where there was no appearance for Respondent, which case established discriminatory prosecution as a defense in police sting operations which target gay public conduct and ignore identical straight public conduct.

Nickerson was recognized as having "made a sort of mini-career out of defending these cases" on lewd conduct and police sting operations targeting gay men. Openly gay himself, he had argued in front of the California Supreme Court and Federal Circuit courts regarding civil rights issues affecting gay people.

Given Nickerson's stance and successful record on gay issues and civil rights, he was the subject of many critics. These included Bill O'Reilly, who interviewed Nickerson on Fox News in 2007 regarding a series of cases that Nickerson had been arguing on behalf of several hundred defendants related to a sting operation targeting gay men in Fresno, California.

Nickerson died in February 2022, aged 80. He was survived by two former wives, his civil partner, and two sons.

== Articles ==
Nickerson successfully argued Baluyut v. Superior Court, (1996) 12 Cal.4th 826, which established discriminatory prosecution as a defense in police sting operations which target gay public conduct and ignore identical straight public conduct.
