= William Emery Nickerson =

American inventor

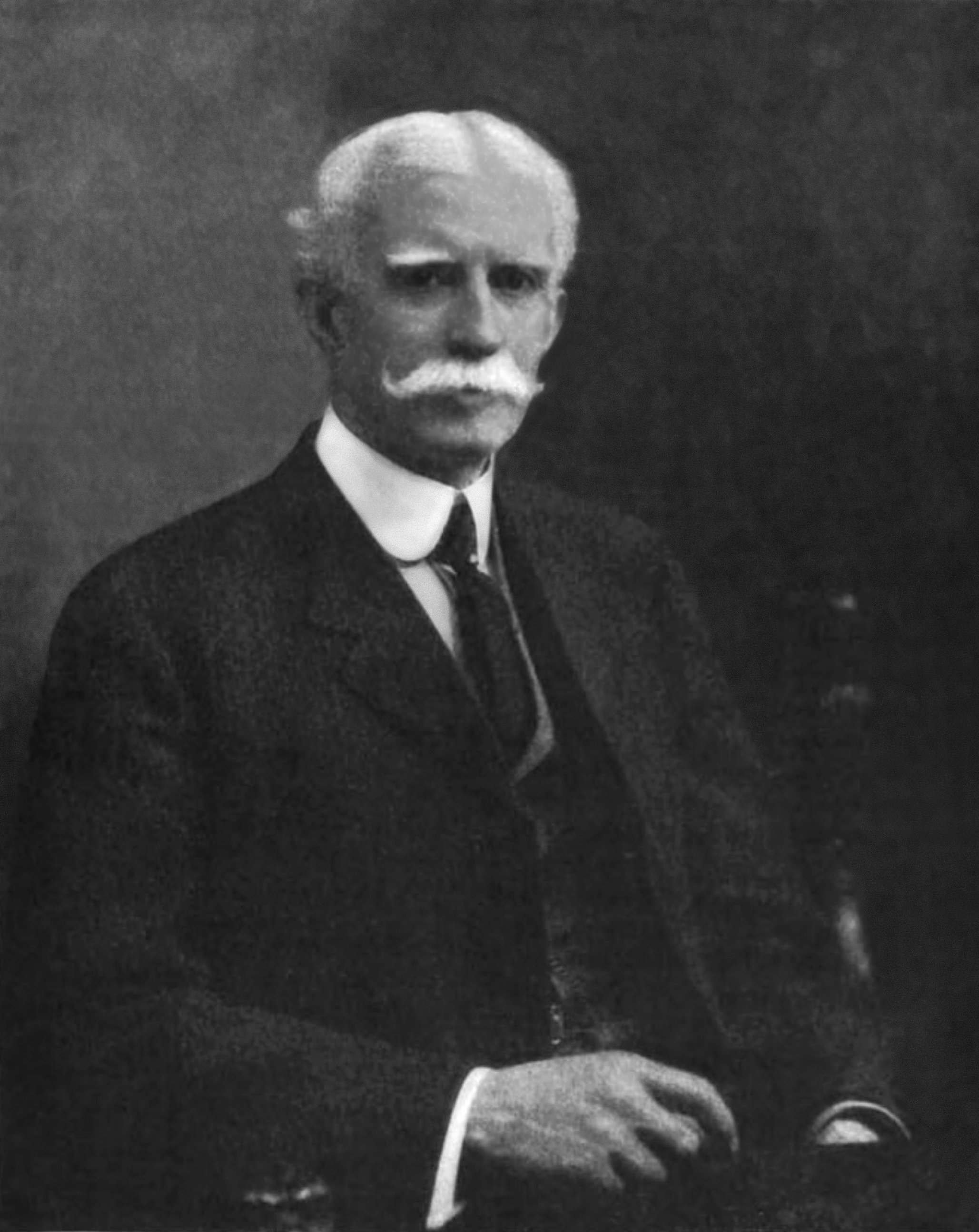
- Nickerson, c. 1918
- Born: November 5, 1853; Provincetown, Massachusetts, U.S.
- Died: June 5, 1930 (aged 76); Boston, Massachusetts, U.S.
- Education: Massachusetts Institute of Technology
- Occupation: Engineer
- Employer: The Gillette Company
- Known for: Safety razor innovations

William Emery Nickerson (November 5, 1853 – June 5, 1930) was an American engineer and inventor. He worked with King C. Gillette at the start of the Gillette Company and was later elected to Gillette's board of directors. Nickerson has been called "the mechanical genius behind the safety razor," and received patents for hardening and sharpening the blades.

== Biography ==
Nickerson was born in Provincetown, Massachusetts, in 1853, and was trained as a chemist at the Massachusetts Institute of Technology (MIT), receiving his degree in 1876. His first patent was related to extracting tanning compound from tree bark; he designed a machine to grind bark finely. After reading of an elevator crash that had killed several people, Nickerson set out to create safety devices that would make elevators safer.

In 1889, Nickerson joined a company creating light bulbs—he worked on a vacuum pump, necessary to remove air from inside the bulb. The Edison Company sued the firm in 1893, on grounds that the Edison Company held a patent on all-glass bulbs; a judge agreed. Nickerson subsequently invented a way to seal the bulb with a plug, something that Thomas Edison had felt was not possible. While the technology was successful, Nickerson's firm was put out of business in 1895 due to price cuts by the Edison Company.

In 1895, Nickerson worked in a new company, on automatic weighing machines for the food industry. The company was reasonably successful, but investors moved the company to Jersey City, New Jersey, and Nickerson accepted a reduced role.

Overall, Nickerson was technically very adept, with many patents to his name, but he was not able to turn his technical expertise into significant business success.

=== Gillette ===
In 1900, Nickerson was asked to review King C. Gillette's razor idea, which he did, but did not meet or become involved with Gillette at that time. In 1901, Nickerson was again asked to review Gillette's razor. This time, after longer review, he "envisioned machinery that would harden and sharpen the thin steel blades to a keen cutting edge." He was so confident, that he offered to take company stock as compensation. Nickerson first met Gillette at this time, and Gillette's company was organized at the end of September 1901.

Nickerson set out to create machinery to produce the blades, working on Atlantic Avenue in Boston. By May 1902, he felt he had a workable design. After Gillette secured additional investors (and funding) for the company, Nickerson was creating sample blades in April. Gillette's new disposable razor, with blades created by Nickerson's machinery, were publicly announced in October.

=== Nickerson Field ===
In his later years, Nickerson was a trustee of Boston University (BU), and he donated funds for the school's college football field in Weston, Massachusetts, which was named in his honor. It was dedicated on October 6, 1928, with a game against the New Hampshire Wildcats. In February 1956, BU was awarded $391,000 for the Weston field, which had been taken by eminent domain for construction of Massachusetts Route 128. BU used the proceeds, in part, to renovate the former Braves Field baseball park in Boston, and on September 28, 1963, it was renamed Nickerson Field, inheriting the name of the prior field in Weston.

=== Personal life ===
Nickerson's hobby was genealogy, and The Nickerson Family Association he founded in 1897 remains active. Nickerson married Nellie Rosalie Partridge in 1875; they had one son, who died in infancy.

Nickerson died in June 1930 in Boston.

== Sources ==
- Adams, Russell B. Jr. (1978). King C. Gillette: The Man and His Wonderful Shaving Device. Little, Brown & Co. ISBN 0-316-00937-7.
