= William Nickerson (British Army officer) =

Recipient of the Victoria Cross

Major-General William Nickerson VC CB CMG
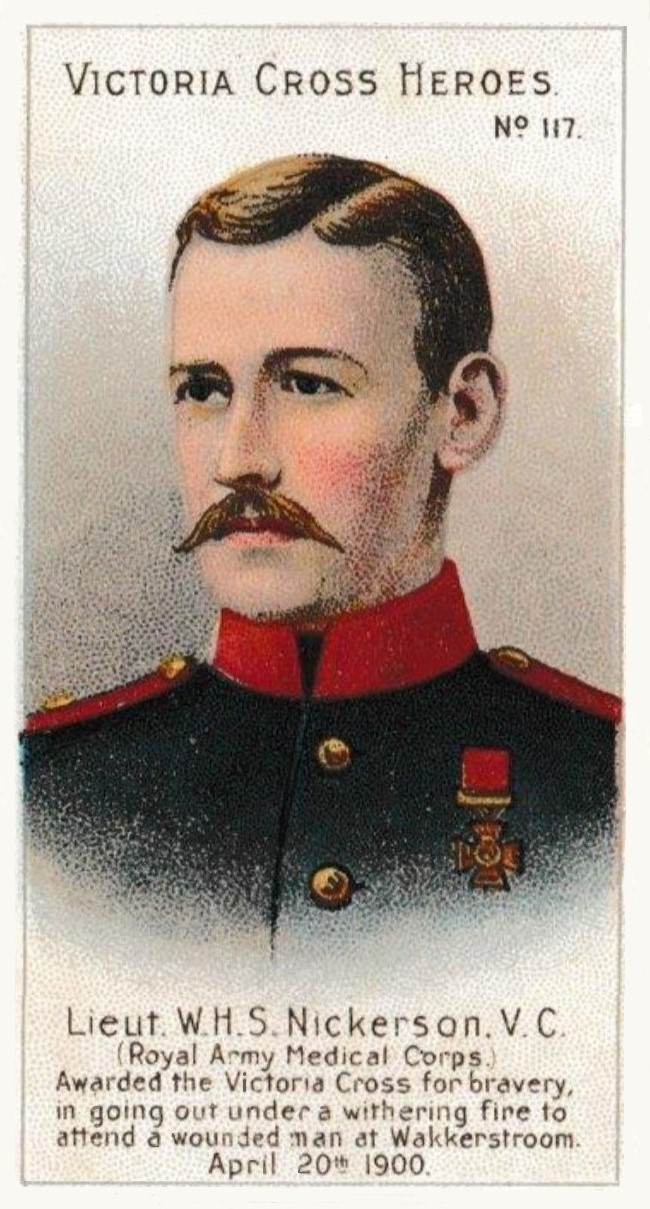
- Nickerson depicted on a cigarette card
- Born: 27 March 1875; Dorchester, New Brunswick, Canada
- Died: 10 May 1954 (aged 79)
- Burial place: Cour, Argyll and Bute, Scotland
- Military career
- Allegiance: United Kingdom
- Branch: British Army
- Service years: 1898 - 1933
- Rank: Major-General
- Units: Royal Army Medical Corps
- Conflicts: Second Boer War; World War I
- Awards: Victoria Cross; Order of the Bath; Order of St Michael and St George; Medal of Military Merit (Greece)

Major-General William Henry Snyder Nickerson (27 March 1875, Dorchester, New Brunswick – 10 May 1954 Kintyre, Argyllshire, Scotland) was a Canadian-born British Army officer and a recipient of the Victoria Cross, the highest and most prestigious award for gallantry in the face of the enemy that can be awarded to British and Commonwealth forces, for actions taken during the Second Boer War.

== Early life ==
He was born at Dorchester, New Brunswick, son of the Reverend D. Nickerson, MA, Chaplain to HM's Forces, and Catherine Snyder, daughter of Reverend W. H. Snyder, MA.

His family returned to England when he was a child. He was educated at Portsmouth Grammar School, Manchester Grammar School and Owen's College, the forerunner of the University of Manchester, graduating in medicine in 1896. A trained physician, he was commissioned as a lieutenant in the Royal Army Medical Corps (RAMC) of the British Army in 1898 and served in the Second Boer War from 1899.

== Victoria Cross ==
Nickerson was a 25-year-old lieutenant in the RAMC, attached to the Mounted Infantry during the Second Boer War, when his actions at Wakkerstroom during the Siege of Wepener led to the award of the Victoria Cross.

His citation reads:

At Wakkerstroom, on the evening of the 20th April, 1900, during the advance of the Infantry to support the Mounted Troops, Lieutenant Nickerson went, in the most gallant manner, under a heavy rifle and shell fire, to attend a wounded man, dressed his wounds, and remained with him till he had him conveyed to a place of safety.

== Later military service ==
Nickerson was promoted to captain in 1901, returning to the United Kingdom at the end of the war in June 1902 on board the SS Soudan, arriving in Southampton in September that year. He was then posted to Egypt.

He served in the First World War, on the Western front and then at Salonika in Greece. By then a major, he was promoted lieutenant-colonel in 1915 and Brevet Colonel in June 1918, becoming a companion of the Order of St Michael and St George in May 1916, companion of the Order of the Bath in June 1919, and receiving the Greek Medal for Military Merit 3rd class.

In 1920 he was a part of the Allied Sanitary Commission in Constantinople. In 1925 he was promoted to major-general and was appointed Honorary Surgeon to the King, becoming Director of Medical Services, India, in September 1929. He retired in September 1933, before serving as Colonel Commandant of the RAMC from December 1933 to April 1945.

== Later life ==
Nickerson died on 10 May 1954 and is buried in the private burial ground at his home in Cour, Kintyre, Scotland.

His medals are privately held.

== Bibliography ==
- Monuments to Courage (David Harvey, 1999)
- The Register of the Victoria Cross (This England, 1997)
- Victoria Crosses of the Anglo-Boer War (Ian Uys, 2000)
