= Smith Nickerson =

Canadian politician (1860–1954)

Smith Asa Nickerson (July 16, 1860 – January 10, 1954) was a merchant and political figure in Nova Scotia, Canada. He represented Shelburne County in the Nova Scotia House of Assembly from 1911 to 1916 in the 35th General Assembly of Nova Scotia as a Liberal member.

He was born in Clark's Harbor, Shelburne County, Nova Scotia, the son of Asa McGray Nickerson and Melissa Newell. Nickerson was involved in lobster packing. In 1882, he married Hannah B. Nickerson. He served as a member of the municipal council for Barrington township from 1893 to 1900. Nickerson died in Sandwick, British Columbia, at the age of 93.
