= Maurice Nickerson =

Canadian politician (1865–1936)

Maurice Ashworth Nickerson (April 28, 1865 – March 3, 1936) was a general merchant and political figure in Nova Scotia, Canada. He represented Shelburne County in the Nova Scotia House of Assembly from 1916 to 1920 as a Liberal member.

He was born in Clark's Harbour, Nova Scotia, the son of Moses H. Nickerson and Mary E. Duncan. In 1888, he married Serena E. Smith. He died in Melrose, Massachusetts at the age of 70.
