= Ernest Reginald Nickerson =

Canadian politician (1876–1956)

Ernest Reginald Nickerson (September 27, 1876 – May 28, 1956) was a merchant and political figure in Nova Scotia, Canada. He represented Shelburne County in the Nova Scotia House of Assembly from 1925 to 1928 as an Independent Conservative member.

He was born in Shag Harbour, Shelburne County, Nova Scotia, the son of Thomas Nickerson and Mary Crowell. In 1901, Nickerson married Ada M. Reid. He served as a member of the municipal council for Barrington township. Nickerson was sergeant-at-arms for the provincial legislature from 1928 to 1933. He was a prominent member of the Sons of Temperance. Nickerson moved from Shag Harbour to Halifax in 1928. He was a salesman for gas and oil burners and an insurance agent there. He died in Halifax at the age of 79.
