= Thomas Robertson (Nova Scotia politician) =

Canadian politician (1852–1902)

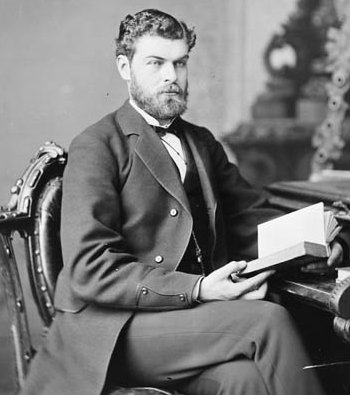

Member of the Canadian Parliament for Shelburne
- In office 1878–1887
- Preceded by: Thomas Coffin
- Succeeded by: John Wimburne Laurie

Member of the Nova Scotia House of Assembly for Shelburne
- In office 1894–1902

Speaker of the Nova Scotia House of Assembly
- In office February 13, 1902 – April 19, 1902
- Preceded by: Frederick Andrew Laurence
- Succeeded by: Frederick Andrew Laurence

Personal details
- Born: September 13, 1852 Barrington Passage, Nova Scotia
- Died: April 19, 1902 (aged 49) Dell Rapids, South Dakota
- Party: Liberal
- Other political affiliations: Nova Scotia Liberal Party
- Children: Wishart McLea Robertson; Robert Burnley Hume Robertson; James Robertson

Thomas Robertson (September 13, 1852 – April 19, 1902) was a Canadian civil servant, entrepreneur and politician. Robertson was a Liberal member of Parliament for the electoral district of Shelburne in the House of Commons of Canada from 1878 to 1887, a Nova Scotia Liberal member of the Nova Scotia House of Assembly from 1894 to 1902, and Speaker of the Legislative Assembly in 1902.

Born in Barrington, Nova Scotia, the son of Robert Robertson and Sarah Richan, he worked in the provincial Department of Public Works and Mines and in the office of the provincial secretary as well as in the immigration branch of the federal Department of Agriculture. In 1884, he married Josephine Hume Allan. Robertson was president of the Barrington and Cape Island Steam Ferry Company and of the Coast Railway Company, nicknamed "Tom Robertson's Wheelbarrow Railway" and later taken over by the Canadian Northern Railway. He established a newspaper, the Cape Sable Advertiser, which operated from 1886 to 1890.

Robertson died in Dell Rapids, South Dakota, at the age of 49 while attempting to recover from an illness.

His son, Wishart McLea Robertson was a senator, Speaker of the Senate, and a minister without portfolio.

== Electoral record ==
1878 Canadian federal election: Shelburne
| Party | Candidate | Votes |
|---|---|---|
| Liberal | Thomas Robertson | 966 |
| Unknown | Robert W. Freeman | 899 |
| Liberal | Thomas Coffin | 198 |

1882 Canadian federal election: Shelburne
| Party | Candidate | Votes |
|---|---|---|
| Liberal | Thomas Robertson | 912 |
| Unknown | N.W. White | 775 |

1887 Canadian federal election: Shelburne
| Party | Candidate | Votes |
|---|---|---|
| Liberal | Thomas Robertson | 1,194 |
| Conservative | John Wimburn Laurie | 1,160 |
