= 1968 Liberal Party of Canada leadership election =

Party election in Canada

- April 6, 1968
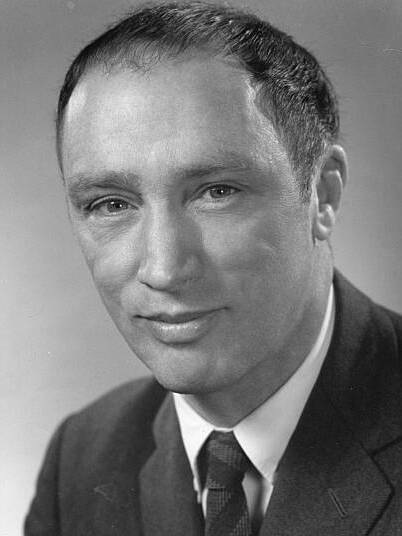

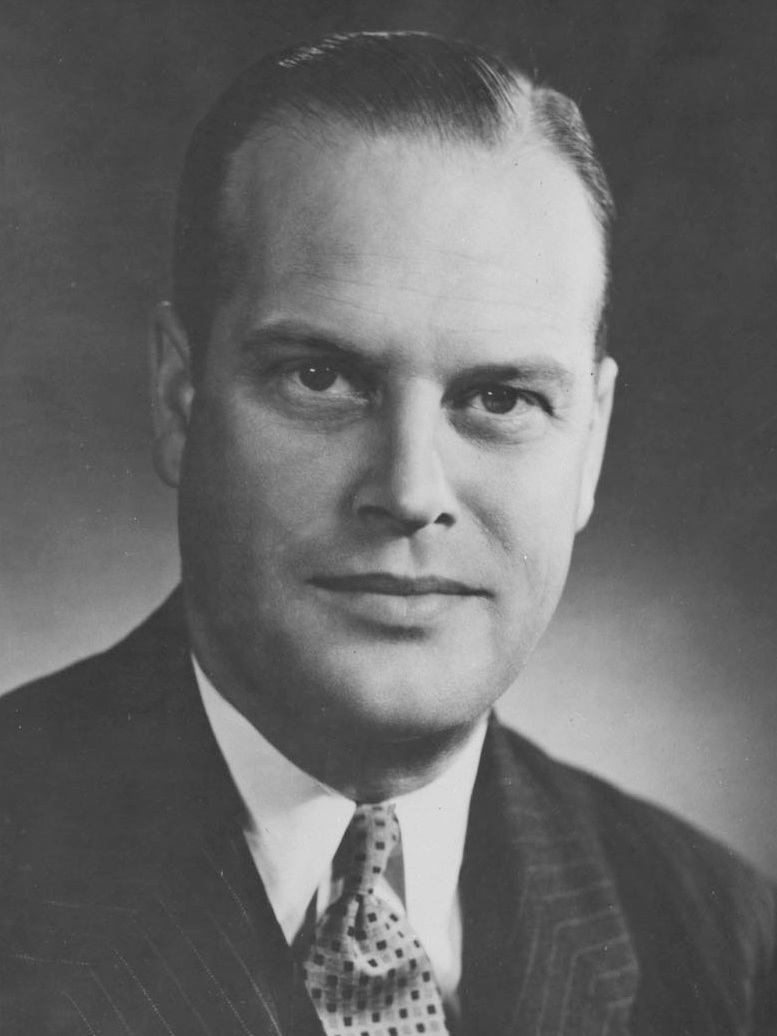

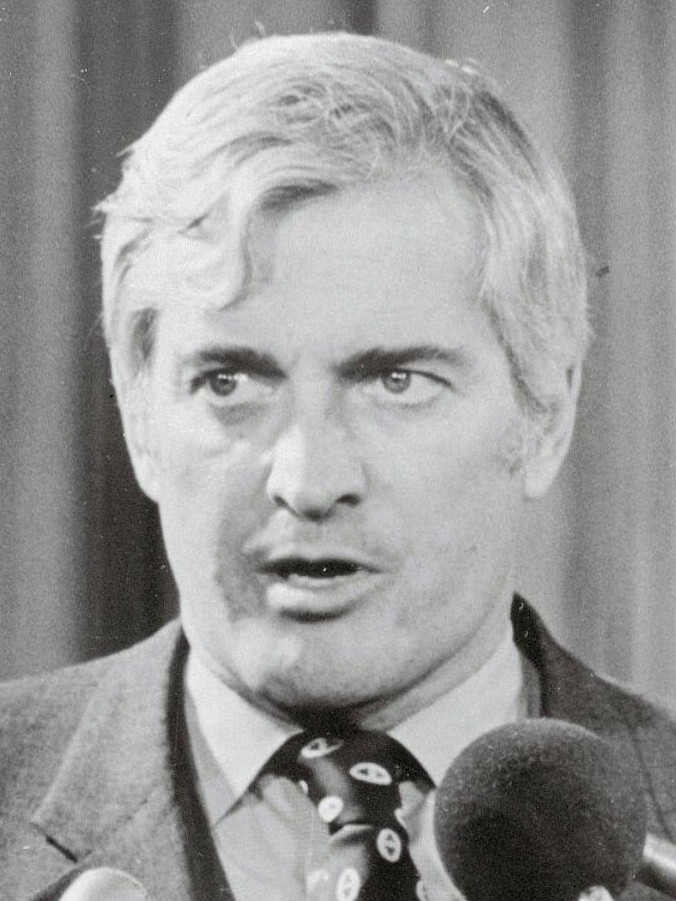

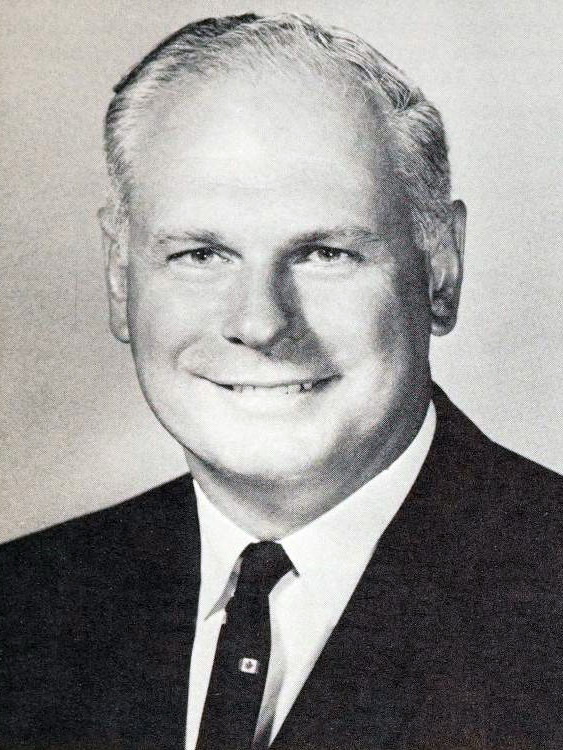

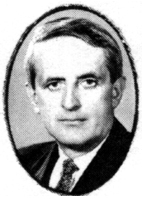

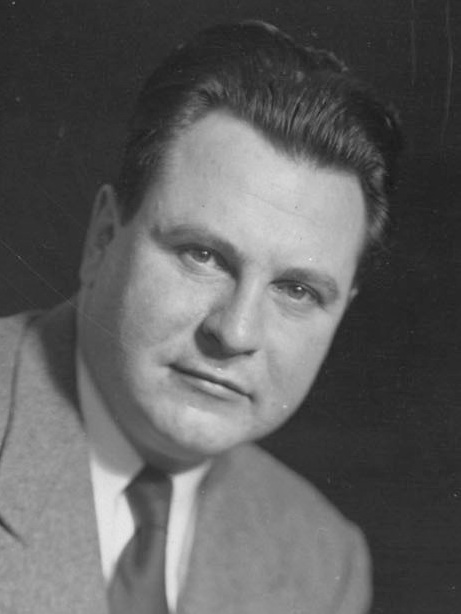

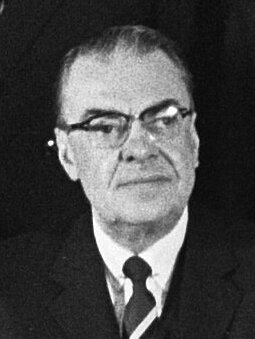

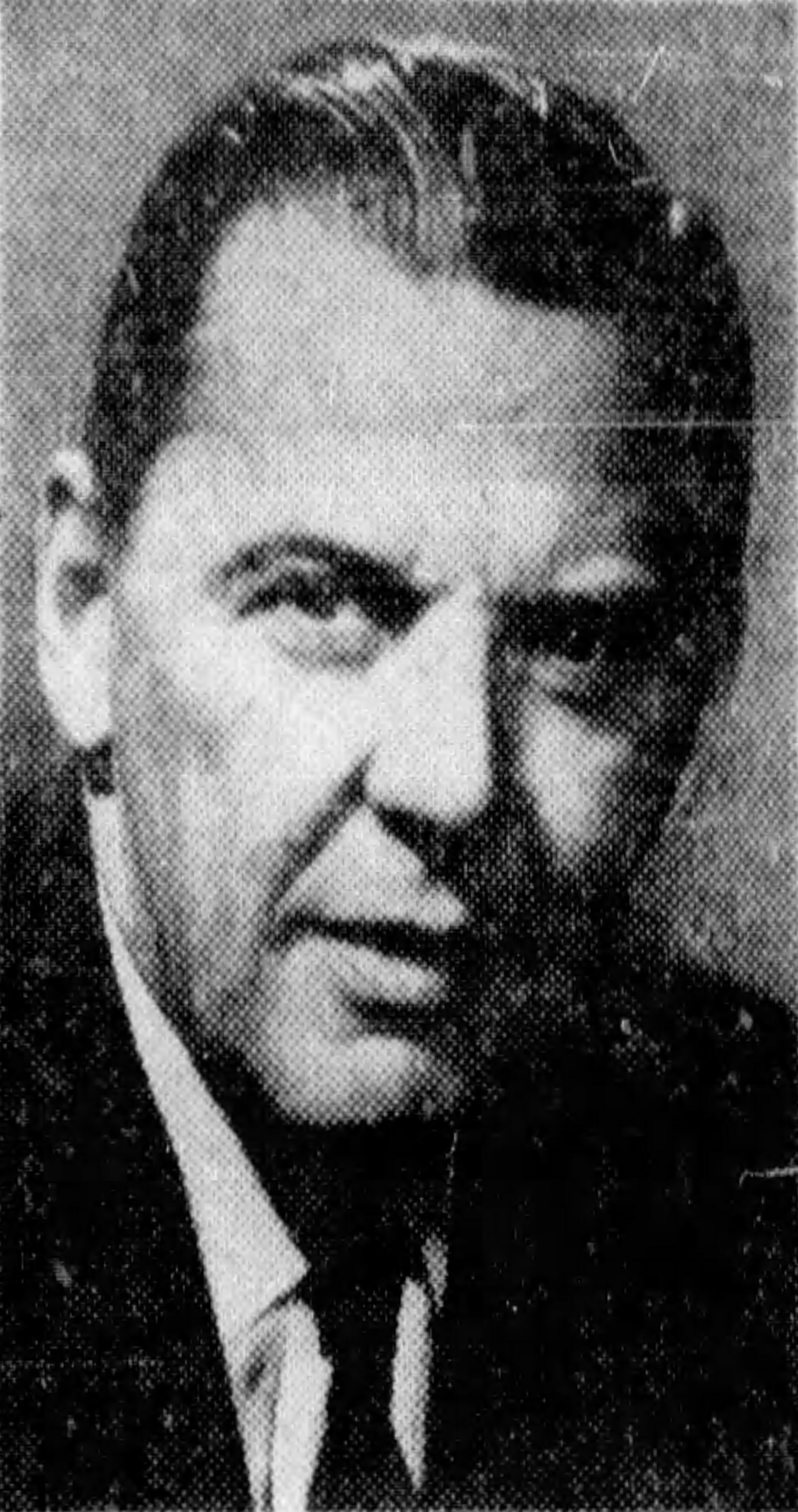
Candidate	Pierre Trudeau	Robert Winters	John Turner
4th ballot	1,203 (50.9%)	954 (40.3%)	195 (8.2%)
3rd ballot	1,051 (44.2%)	621 (26.1%)	277 (11.7%)
2nd ballot	964 (40.5%)	373 (19.9%)	347 (14.6%)
1st ballot	752 (31.5%)	293 (12.3%)	277 (11.6%)
Candidate	Paul Hellyer	Joe Greene	Allan MacEachen
4th ballot	Withdrew	Eliminated	Eliminated
3rd ballot	333 (15.9%)	29 (1.2%)	Eliminated
2nd ballot	465 (19.5%)	104 (4.4%)	11 (0.5%)
1st ballot	330 (13.8%)	169 (7.1%)	163 (6.8%)
Candidate	Paul Martin	Eric Kierans
4th ballot	Withdrew	Withdrew
3rd ballot	Withdrew	Withdrew
2nd ballot	Withdrew	Withdrew
1st ballot	277 (11.6%)	103 (4.3%)
Leader before election
Lester B. Pearson
Elected Leader
Pierre Trudeau

1968 Liberal leadership election
- Date: April 6, 1968
- Convention: Ottawa Civic Centre
- Resigning leader: Lester Pearson
- Won by: Pierre Trudeau
- Ballots: 4
- Candidates: 9
- Entrance fee: none
- Spending limit: none

The Liberal Party of Canada held a leadership election on April 6, 1968. The election was won by Minister of Justice and Attorney General Pierre Elliott Trudeau, who became the new prime minister of Canada as a result. He was the unexpected winner in what was one of the most important leadership conventions in party history. The Globe and Mail's newspaper report the next day called it "the most chaotic, confusing, and emotionally draining convention in Canadian political history."

The convention was held following the announced retirement of Lester B. Pearson, who was a well-respected party leader and prime minister, but who had failed to win a majority government in two attempts. Eight high-profile cabinet ministers entered the race, but by the time the convention began on April 3, the charismatic Trudeau had emerged as the front runner. He was strongly opposed by the party's right wing, but this faction was divided between former Minister of Trade and Commerce Robert Winters and Minister of Transport Paul Hellyer and failed to mount a united opposition. Trudeau won the leadership with the support of 51% delegates on the fourth ballot of the convention.

== Pearson retires ==
A picture from April 1967 showing Prime Minister Lester B. Pearson and three other members of his cabinet. From left to right, with Pearson: Pierre Trudeau, John Turner and Jean Chrétien. All three would become Prime Ministers of Canada.

Liberal leader and Prime Minister Lester Pearson announced on December 14, 1967, that he would be retiring in April 1968. Pearson had been Liberal leader since 1958 and prime minister since 1963. He was still much liked by the party and by the Canadian people in general, but had failed to win a majority government in the 1963 and 1965 elections. Liberals were also trailing in the polls behind the Progressive Conservatives, whose popular new leader Robert Stanfield had been selected in September 1967.

Long before the actual convention, a vigorous leadership contest had begun. At the outset, the leading candidates were believed to be Secretary of State for External Affairs Paul Martin, Minister of Transport Paul Hellyer, and Minister of Finance Mitchell Sharp. The unofficial Liberal Party tradition was to alternate between francophone and anglophone leaders, and Jean Marchand was considered a possible candidate. Martin was a highly respected veteran minister who had finished second to Pearson in the 1958 convention, and his ambitions to try again for the top job were well known. Hellyer was a former Minister of National Defence who had unified the Royal Canadian Navy, Canadian Army, and Royal Canadian Air Force into the Canadian Forces.

Marchand declined to run, however, not being interested and suggesting that his English and health were not good enough to be a national leader. It was seen as necessary for national unity and the health of the party to have a strong Quebec candidate. Marchand and Gérard Pelletier united behind Justice Minister Pierre Trudeau. Trudeau had little experience and was not well known nationally, but had earned some renown for his wit and charisma. He had received plaudits for a wide-ranging overhaul of the criminal code that removed many of the morality laws, such as those against sodomy. Trudeau also had the strong support of top Pearson advisor Marc Lalonde as well as the tacit backing of Pearson himself, who felt it was important that a Francophone finish at least second in the race.

== Candidates ==
About ten days before the convention, the organizing committee of the convention released a list of nine candidates that would be permitted to address delegates at the convention, in response to numerous fringe candidates declaring in the few weeks prior to the convention.

- Joe Greene, 47, agriculture minister since 1965 and MP for Renfrew South, Ontario since 1963
- Paul Hellyer, 44, transport minister since 1967 and had been a Toronto MP since 1949. He served briefly as associate minister of national defence in 1957 in St. Laurent's last government, and as minister of national defence under Pearson prior.
- Eric Kierans, 54, Quebec Liberal MNA since 1963, and a former senior cabinet minister as minister of revenue and then minister of health under Quebec Premier Jean Lesage as well as president of the Quebec Liberal Party.
- Allan MacEachen, 46, health minister since 1965 and MP for Inverness—Richmond, Nova Scotia from 1953 to 1958 and again since 1962, served previously as minister of labour in Pearson's cabinet.
- Paul Martin (Sr.), 64, secretary of state for external affairs since 1963 and MP for Essex East, Ontario since 1935, had first entered Cabinet in 1945 as Secretary of State of Canada in the King ministry, served as minister of national health and welfare in the St. Laurent ministry. He was the runner-up to Pearson in the 1958 leadership convention.
- Mitchell Sharp, 57, finance minister since 1965 and MP for Eglinton, Ontario since 1963. He was and previously trade and commerce minister. Withdrew the day before the convention and endorsed Trudeau.
- Pierre Elliot Trudeau, 48, justice minister since 1967 and MP for Mount Royal, Quebec, since 1965. Before entering politics he had been a law professor, writer, and founder and editor of the dissident journal Cité Libre.
- John Turner, 38, minister of consumer and corporate affairs since 1967 and MP for St. Lawrence—St. George, Quebec since 1962. He entered cabinet as a minister without portfolio in 1965.
- Robert Winters, 57, trade and commerce minister since 1966 and MP for York West, Ontario since 1965. He was previously MP for Queens--Lunenburg, Nova Scotia 1945-1957 and a public work minister, resources and development minister and reconstruction minister during the post-war years in the St. Laurent ministry. He lost his seat at the 1957 election and became a corporate executive in Toronto, and was persuaded to return to politics by Pearson.

Two fringe candidates managed to secure 50 delegate signature by close of nomination to get on the ballot, and were allocated time to address delegates.

- Harold Lloyd Henderson, 61, was a Presbyterian minister and the former mayor of Portage la Prairie, Manitoba. He had stood in the 1958 Liberal leadership convention, where he received a single vote.
- Ernst Zündel, 29, a German immigrant self-described as a "nuisance candidate", campaigned on a "immigrant rights" and "national unity" platform. He delivered his convention speech and withdrew before balloting. Decades later he would gain infamy as Canada's most prolific Holocaust denier, but his view was not known then as he published his opinions under the pseudonym.

The candidacies of other fringe candidates were announced by the party, were not placed on the ballot as they did not obtain the 50 delegate signatures required:

- Ronald Ball, 36, of Toronto
- James Belding, 23 of Fredericton, a student at the University of New Brunswick, on platform of being a voice for the youth, and for post secondary education funding
- Theodore Greenslade, of Cornwall, candidacy announced by the party, but he later claimed his name was submitted without his knowledge.
- Leonard Kruger, 55, of Winnipeg, a music writer, campaign to introduce a space-age calendar to increase the number of Sundays from 52 to 61 per year.
- John Kroeker, 38, of Ottawa, a disgruntle former public servant fired from the finance department in 1965 for public criticism of the Canada Pension Plan.
- Lionel Laframboise, 46, of Elliot Lake, a mine development agent and an salesman of the Paul Desmarais Bus Lines, insured his emblemaic mustache for $1 million with Lloyd's of London for the duration of the campaign.
- Gerry Reinboth, 56, of Toronto, a welfare worker
- Rod Woodcock, 21, of Edmonton, withdrew prior to convention and endorsed Trudeau, he would later be the runner-up to Bob Russell at the 1971 Alberta Liberal leadership convention with 51 votes.

== The campaign ==
The campaign consisted of trying to win over the almost twenty-four hundred delegates who would go to the April convention. These consisted of prominent Liberals from across the country and also ordinary party members elected by each riding association. The campaign lasted from after the Christmas recess up to the convention. Parliament was in session during this period and since all the major candidates were important cabinet ministers finding time to campaign was difficult. Thus it mostly consisted of the candidates taking short trips to various parts of the country to try to win over delegates.

=== Trudeau campaign ===
External videos
- – Pierre Trudeau declares 'Canada must be a just society' in 1968 – Sept. 9, 1968, CBC/Radio-Canada, (2:22 mins).

As Trudeau gained more public exposure, his popularity grew. Trudeau is believed to have decided he would run while on holiday in Tahiti over the Christmas break of 1967. The winter of 1968 was dominated by the lead-up to a February constitutional convention, at which Trudeau as justice minister was expected to play an important role. Lalonde, with the approval of Pearson, organized a pre-convention national tour in which Trudeau met with each of the premiers to talk about the constitution, and also to get guaranteed news coverage. One of his most important meetings was with Newfoundland Premier Joey Smallwood, whom Trudeau sufficiently impressed to earn Smallwood's lasting support. At the constitutional convention itself, Trudeau made a strong impression by outmanoeuvring and outdebating Quebec Premier Daniel Johnson, Sr. on national television. Johnson, and many others, felt that French Canadian disaffection could only be addressed by giving Quebec more autonomy. Trudeau rejected this approach, arguing that the best way to protect the interests of French Canadians was to guarantee their rights across Canada. On February 17, only days after this success, Trudeau declared himself as an official candidate for the Liberal leadership.

To the surprise of many, Trudeau became one of the prime contenders. Marchand played a leading role in Trudeau's campaign and brought in many supporters, especially in Quebec. Trudeau received endorsements from three cabinet ministers, and two provincial premiers, with Louis Robichaud of New Brunswick joining Smallwood. Trudeau's charisma and attention-grabbing behaviour earned him far more media coverage than any other candidate. A Université Laval study found that from January 1 to March 20, Trudeau had received 26% percent of the media coverage devoted to the nine candidates running. Finance Minister Mitchell Sharp was a distant second, with only 16%. Trudeau also received attention outside Canada, being profiled in both the British and American media.

By the end of the campaign, Trudeau was unquestionably the most popular figure among the Canadian public. A public opinion poll gave Trudeau 32% support, Martin 14% and Winters 10%, with the other candidates in single digits. Many within the Liberal Party still had deep doubts about him, however. He was a recent convert, having joined the party only in 1965, and was still considered an outsider. Some saw him as too radical and outspoken a figure and bitterly opposed his views on divorce, abortion and homosexuality. A number of minor scandals also broke out, including one where articles written by Trudeau that were deeply critical of Pearson, especially of the decision to accept nuclear weapons in Canada, were republished. Trudeau was also forced to explain why he had been blacklisted by the United States in the 1950s. His campaign was not run by professional political consultants, instead being directed by a group of young, extremely well educated amateurs such as Gordon Gibson and Jim Davey. The team impressed many, but it also made a number of errors.

=== Other candidates ===
The race was by no means a sure thing for Trudeau, and a number of potent candidates remained in the contest. Finance Minister Mitchell Sharp was one of the highest-profile cabinet ministers and represented the same liberal wing of the party as Trudeau. His campaign was badly hurt, however, when on February 19 the government was unexpectedly defeated on a tax bill, almost forcing a snap election. Pearson was out of the country, and as senior minister and finance minister getting the bill passed was Sharp's responsibility. After this debacle Sharp was prevented from campaigning through much of March by having to deal with a collapse in the world gold market. Though he campaigned intensively in the last few days, internal polling found that Sharp had fewer than 150 delegates and was unlikely to even be able to play kingmaker. The day before the convention, Sharp dropped out of the race and endorsed Trudeau. Sharp brought other ministers with him into the Trudeau camp, including Jean Chrétien, and at least a hundred delegates. The endorsement of the respected elder statesman also reassured many who liked Trudeau but were worried about his radical image. A number of potent candidates remained in the race, including much of the inner cabinet. Paul Hellyer ran one of the most skilled campaigns, directed by Bill Lee, widely regarded as one of the Liberals' best campaign managers. The campaign received much attention for using a computer to keep track of delegates. By the convention Hellyer was widely viewed as having the greatest chance to defeat Trudeau. He had several prominent backers including Defence Minister Leo Cadieux and Secretary of State Judy LaMarsh. He drew support from a wide part of the political spectrum and from across the country, but was generally seen as somewhat to the right of Trudeau.

Robert Winters entered the race late, but won strong support representing the right wing of the party. He promised to privatize crown corporations if elected and also was highly critical of Pearson's fiscal policy, arguing that the new social programs would damage the Canadian economy. The faction of the party that was deeply worried about Trudeau's insurgency hoped for one of Hellyer or Winters to drop out and support the other, but neither would compromise.

Several other prominent ministers remained in the campaign, but were seen as having little chance of victory. The campaign of elder statesman Paul Martin, who had first run for the Liberal leadership in 1958, had slowly faded. Canada seemed in a mood to reject elder statesmen with few new ideas in favour of the fresh new faces. Martin remained in the race, however. Health Minister Allan MacEachen was also floundering and being pressured to drop out in favour of Trudeau, but he too remained. He had a firm base of support in his native Nova Scotia, but was expected to swing his votes to Trudeau after the first ballot. MacEachen ran on a strongly left-wing platform, defending Canada's new Medicare system. Agriculture minister Joe Greene was also still in the race and had support in Eastern and Northern Ontario, but was seen as a dark horse. Besides Trudeau, the candidate to garner the most attention for his charisma and oratory was the young junior minister John Turner. He gathered a following, but was viewed as too young and inexperienced to win.

Former Quebec provincial cabinet minister Eric Kierans ran a solid campaign with minimal resources. He developed a small following, but never having been a federal cabinet minister and without a seat in the House of Commons he remained an outsider.

Two fringe candidates also ran. Reverend Lloyd Henderson, a former mayor of Portage la Prairie, Manitoba had received one vote when he ran in the 1958 Liberal leadership convention and had also run unsuccessfully for parliament as an independent in the 1960s. He was not a delegate himself at the 1968 convention and would famously receive no votes even though his wife was a delegate. Ernst Zündel, not yet known publicly as a Holocaust denier, was also a candidate but dropped out before the first ballot after delivering a speech to the convention, decrying what he alleged was discrimination against German-Canadians.

== The convention ==
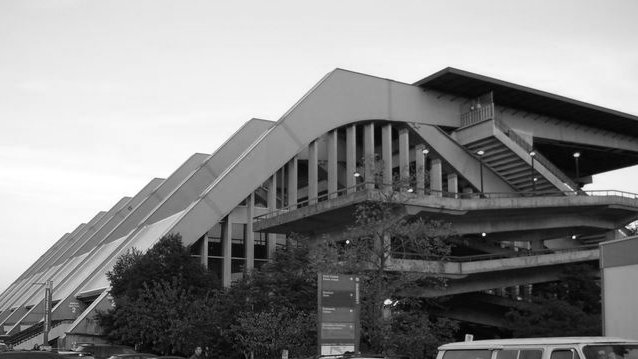
The Ottawa Civic Centre, where the convention was held

The convention, held at Ottawa, Ontario's Civic Centre, took place in the shadow of the assassination of Martin Luther King Jr. and the riots that followed in the United States. The opening day of the convention was dedicated to giving tribute to Pearson, still a much-respected and popular figure, and he gave his parting address to the delegates. The following day consisted of a series of policy workshops. These were based around three halls named Our Life, Our Country, and Our Economy. Each candidate had twenty-five minutes to discuss the topic of the room with delegates. The other candidates noted in alarm that Trudeau drew by far the largest crowds to these events. Friday consisted of speeches by each of the candidates. It was marked by strong speeches by Trudeau, Turner, and surprisingly, Greene. Greene's speech focused on his service in the air force during the Second World War and reportedly moved some in the audience to tears. Hellyer's address, described as like the reading of a treatise, was poorly received. Hellyer's campaign manager, Bill Lee, later reported that the speeches had caused at least a hundred votes to move from Hellyer to Greene.

Outside the convention halls, each candidate's team worked to woo delegates. Most of the candidates set up conventional hospitality suites with food and drink for the delegates. Trudeau had nine set up in the various Ottawa hotels, though he did not provide any alcohol. Joe Greene did not have enough money for this, so he gave each delegate Laura Secord chocolates. Allan MacEachen had his own television station, AJM-TV, which broadcast to all the hotels where the delegates were staying; delegates could call in with questions and MacEachen would answer them. The system was plagued with technical difficulties and was not a great success. Hellyer and Trudeau were more successful with publishing a newspaper on each day of the convention, reporting on upcoming events and selling the candidate. Each candidate also had a team of "convention hostesses," young women dressed in matching uniforms who accompanied the candidate, handed out buttons, and generally tried to build enthusiasm for their candidate.

As with the other conventions of the time, the new leader was decided by runoff voting. Multiple votes were held, and after each round the candidate with the fewest votes was removed from the ballot. This continued until a single candidate won a majority. In the 1968 convention, this process took four ballots and seven and a half hours. The delay was blamed on the new IBM punched card machines that were used to count the votes. Despite instructions not to, a good number of the delegates folded their punched card as they would a normal ballot. These folded ballots caused the machines to repeatedly jam.

The weather was surprisingly warm for that time of year, and, as the convention centre was not well air conditioned, the delegates were left sweltering. Food stands also ran out of supplies early, leaving many delegates hungry. Crowd control was reported as "non-existent", and even the candidates had to battle their way through the throng to get anywhere. Asked the next day what his first thought was after being elected, Trudeau quipped that it was "how am I ever going to reach the podium". Outside were several protests, the largest being against the Vietnam War and demanding that Canada stop selling materiel to the United States.

=== First ballot ===
First ballot

Trudeau	752	31.5%
Hellyer	330	13.8%
Winters	293	12.3%
Martin	277	11.6%
Turner	277	11.6%
Greene	169	7.1%
MacEachen	163	6.8%
Kierans	103	4.3%
Henderson	0	0.0%
Spoiled ballots	24	1.0%
Total votes cast	2388

Trudeau was in first place on the first ballot with about as many votes as expected. Winters and Greene did surprisingly well, creating an unexpected four-way split in the anti-Trudeau vote with Turner and Hellyer. The result was especially disappointing to Hellyer, who had expected to get two hundred more votes than he had.

After the first ballot, Martin, MacEachen, and Kierans withdrew, knowing they could not win. Henderson, who did not get a single vote (despite Mrs. Henderson being a voting delegate), was automatically eliminated. Kierans, despite being courted, did not endorse another candidate. Martin's tie for fourth ended any chance of victory, or even of playing kingmaker. After speaking with advisors and his son (future prime minister Paul Martin), Martin delivered an emotional withdrawal address that marked the end of his career in politics. Despite earlier discussions with the Hellyer camp, he did not endorse another candidate. Several of Martin's supporters, including Herb Gray, moved to support Trudeau. MacEachen withdrew and, as was expected, quickly endorsed Trudeau. However, he did not withdraw in time, and therefore remained listed on the second ballot.

Throughout the voting Trudeau projected an image of what Radwanski referred to as "supreme detachment." In his booth Trudeau played with the flower in his lapel and ate grapes by tossing them up in the air and catching them in his mouth.

=== Second ballot ===
Second ballot

Trudeau	964	40.5%
Winters	473	19.9%
Hellyer	465	19.5%
Turner	347	14.6%
Greene	104	4.4%
MacEachen	11	0.5%
Spoiled ballots	15	0.6%
Total votes cast	2379

Trudeau's vote increased on the second ballot. The greatest surprise was Winters, who seemed to be drawing the largest share of the stop-Trudeau votes, with Hellyer unexpectedly falling into third place. Great pressure was exerted on Hellyer, and Turner and Greene, to unite behind Winters. Cabinet minister Judy LaMarsh was famously caught on tape telling Hellyer that "you've got to go to Winters. Don't let that bastard win it, Paul—he isn't even a Liberal." Only eight votes behind Winters, and still seeing a chance of victory, Hellyer refused to quit. Turner also stayed unexpectedly and he resolutely refused to deal. Greene was saved from elimination by MacEachen remaining on the ballot, but he promised to endorse Trudeau after the next round. Belatedly, Hellyer and Winters agreed that whoever finished third on the next ballot would withdraw and back the other against Trudeau, but most observers felt the time to block Trudeau had passed. Peacock states that it is "fascinating to speculate" what would have happened if Hellyer and Winters had reached an agreement after the second ballot, but he feels that Trudeau most likely would still have won.

=== Third ballot ===
Third ballot

Trudeau	1051	44.2%
Winters	621	26.1%
Hellyer	377	15.9%
Turner	279	11.7%
Greene	29	1.2%
Spoiled ballots	19	0.8%
Total votes cast	2376

Fourth ballot

Trudeau	1203	50.9%
Winters	954	40.3%
Turner	195	8.2%
Spoiled ballots	13	0.5%
Total votes cast	2,365

The third ballot was a close repeat of the second, but Trudeau and Winters began to draw off a substantial number of votes from the candidates who no longer were seen to have had a chance of victory. As per earlier agreements Hellyer and Greene withdrew after this ballot, with Hellyer backing Winters and Greene endorsing Trudeau. To the surprise of many, Turner insisted on remaining on the ballot.

=== Final ballot ===
Trudeau and Winters won additional support on the final ballot, while Turner, despite having no hope of victory, won almost two hundred votes. Turner's delegates would later form the "195 Club," which would become fundamental in his 1984 run. Trudeau placed 249 votes ahead of Winters on this last ballot with 51% of the vote. With this majority, Trudeau was declared the winner.

=== Results ===
Delegate support by Ballot Withdrew prior to ballot Eliminated
Candidate	First ballot		Second ballot		Third ballot		Fourth ballot	
Candidate	Votes	%	Votes	%	Votes	%	Votes	%
Pierre Trudeau	752	31.81	964 ▲212	40.78 ▲8.97	1,051 ▲87	44.59 ▲3.81	1,203 ▲152	51.15 ▲6.56
Paul Hellyer	330	13.96	465 ▲135	19.67 ▲5.71	377 ▼88	15.99 ▼3.68	Endorsed Winters	
Robert Winters	293	12.39	473 ▲180	20.01 ▲7.61	621 ▲148	26.35 ▲6.34	954 ▲333	40.56 ▲14.21
Paul Martin Sr.	277	11.72	Did not endorse					
John Turner	277	11.72	347 ▲70	14.68 ▲2.96	279 ▼68	11.84 ▼2.84	195 ▼84	8.29 ▼3.55
Joe Greene	169	7.15	104 ▼65	4.4 ▼2.75	29 ▼75	1.23 ▼3.17	Endorsed Trudeau	
Allan MacEachen	163	6.90	^{[A]}11 ▼152	0.47 ▼6.43	Endorsed Trudeau			
Eric Kierans	103	4.36	Did not endorse					
Harold Lloyd Henderson	0	—	Did not endorse					
Valid Ballots	2,364		2,364	Steady	2,357	▼7	2,352	▼5
Spoiled ballots (% of ballots cast)	24	1.0	15	0.6	19	0.8	13	0.6
Delegate ballots cast	2,388		2,379	▼11	2,376	▼3	2,365	▼11

^{A} MacEachen announced after the first ballot that he was withdrawing and would support Trudeau, but he missed the deadline to remove his name from the ballot.

	1st	2nd	3rd	final
Trudeau	31.81	40.78	44.59	51.15
Winters	13.96	19.67	15.99	—
Hellyer	12.39	20.01	26.35	40.56
Turner	11.72	14.68	11.84	8.29
Martin	11.72	—	—	—
Greene	7.15	4.40	1.23	—
MacEachen	6.90	0.47	—	—
Kierans	4.36	—	—	—

== Trudeau victorious ==
Trudeau about to make his victory speech. Lined up behind him are the other leadership candidates.^{View Clip}

Trudeau won the leadership on the fourth and final ballot, and all the remaining candidates endorsed him. This included both Winters and Hellyer, but observers noted that neither man did so with much enthusiasm. The subsequent Trudeau victory party at the Skyline Hotel swelled to massive proportions as over 5,000 revellers attended and the celebration spilled out into nearby streets.

Trudeau was sworn in as Liberal leader and prime minister two weeks later on April 20. That summer he led the Liberals to victory in the 1968 federal election. Canadians were quickly caught up in the excitement created by this youthful and dynamic leader. His popularity following the convention and through the general election was dubbed "Trudeaumania" by the media; Trudeau was often mobbed by fans, as if he were a rock star.

== Aftermath ==
While Winters announced his support for Trudeau at the convention, he quit politics soon afterward returning to the private sector. He died only a year later.

In the cabinet shuffle immediately following the contest, Trudeau conferred the formal designation of "Senior Minister" to Hellyer in addition to his cabinet portfolio. The ceremonial title formally place Hellyer ahead of other cabinet colleagues in the order of precedence and made him the default alternate to act on behalf of the prime minister upon the absence of the prime minister. In addition to retaining the transport portfolio held in the Pearson ministry, Hellyer was assigned special responsibility by Trudeau for a new federal task force on housing and urban development. The task force tabled its report within a year calling for greater role by the federal government in housing, which conflicted with Trudeau's view of federalism. The disagreements over the implementation of the report led to Hellyer's resignation from Trudeau's cabinet after just shy of a year, and the title Senior Minister has not been revived since. After leaving caucus and a failed attempt at form a new party of his own, he was invited by PC leader Robert Stanfield to join the PC caucus. He held on Trinity seat as a Conservative in the 1972 election but was defeated in 1974. He nonetheless ran for the leadership of the Progressive Conservative Party upon Stanfield resignation in 1974.

After the unpleasant experience with Hellyer, Trudeau designated no standing deputy or default alternate for eight years. It was not until 1977 when MacEachen was formally named Deputy Prime Minister that another cabinet member was designated as such.

Turner served in Trudeau's cabinet, becoming one of the most powerful MPs until quitting in 1975. He eventually returned to politics and succeeded Trudeau in the 1984 Liberal leadership convention. Greene and MacEachen both served Trudeau ably as ministers before being appointed to the Senate of Canada.

The 1968 leadership convention did more than choose a single leader of the Liberal party: it did a great deal to set the history of the party, and of Canada, for the next four decades. Four future prime ministers were at the convention. Trudeau remained leader of the Liberal Party until 1984, and was prime minister for all of that time except during Joe Clark's short-lived Conservative government of 1979–1980.

His replacement by Turner in 1984 was largely a product of Turner's showing at the 1968 convention. After Winters' death, Turner's third-place showing made him the leading runner-up. Turner's political and organizational skills were much lauded in 1968, establishing him as one of the highest-profile Liberals. Turner was succeeded by Jean Chrétien in 1990. Chrétien had originally backed the leadership bid of his mentor, Mitchell Sharp, but joined Trudeau's campaign when Sharp withdrew in favour of Trudeau. At the convention, Chrétien became one of the Trudeau team's leading figures, playing a crucial role in recruiting a number of other cabinet ministers to the Trudeau fold. Chrétien continued to be Trudeau's loyal deputy until Trudeau's retirement in 1984. Chrétien would go on to win the Liberal leadership in 1990 and become prime minister in 1993, in part by claiming to be the heir to Trudeau's vision and policies. Paul Martin, who would himself become prime minister in 2003, was also at the convention, not as a Liberal operative, but as a close advisor to his father Paul Martin Sr. His father's poor showing, permanently ending his long dream of becoming prime minister, has long been cited by biographers as the source of the ceaseless ambition by Martin Jr. to win Canada's top job.
