= Paul Martin Sr. =

Canadian lawyer, politician and diplomat

The Right Honourable Paul Martin Sr. PC CC QC
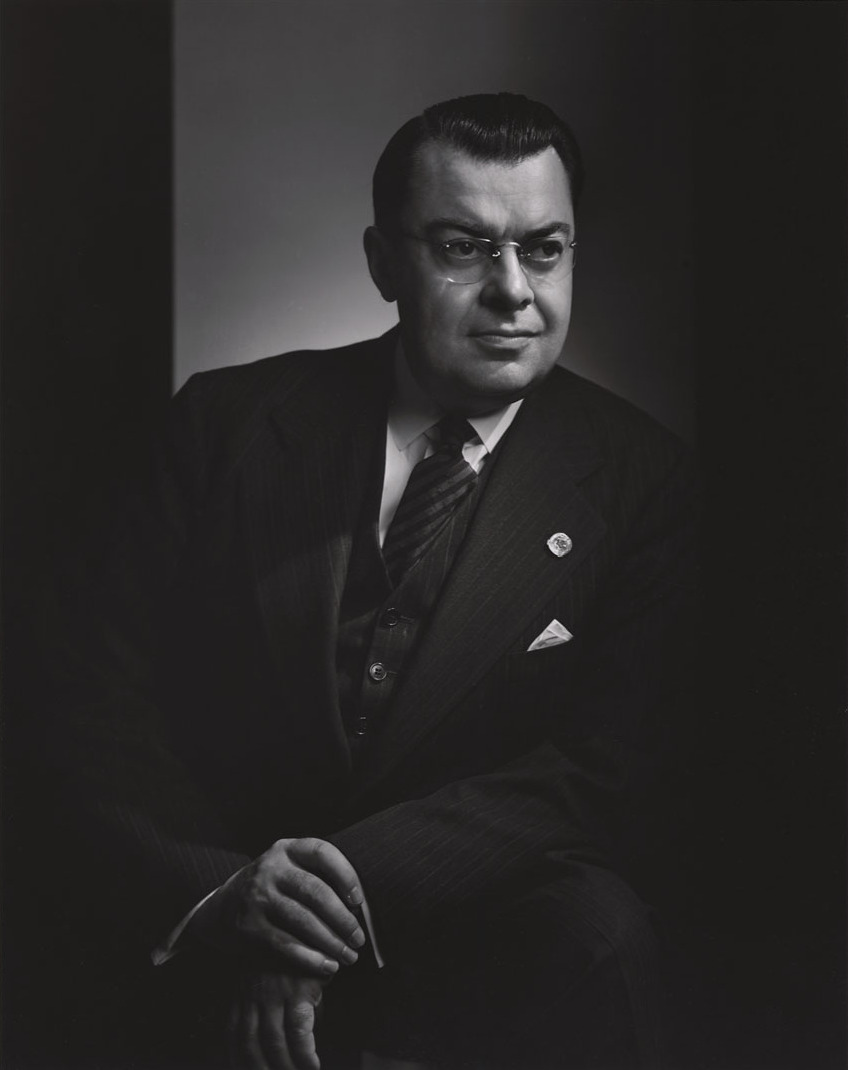
- Martin Sr. in 1943

Canadian High Commissioner to the United Kingdom
- In office October 31, 1974 – November 1, 1979
- Prime Minister: Pierre Trudeau; Joe Clark
- Preceded by: Jake Warren
- Succeeded by: Jean Casselman Wadds

Secretary of State for External Affairs
- In office April 22, 1963 – April 19, 1968
- Prime Minister: Lester B. Pearson
- Preceded by: Howard Charles Green
- Succeeded by: Mitchell Sharp

Minister of National Health and Welfare
- In office December 12, 1946 – June 20, 1957
- Prime Minister: Louis St. Laurent; W. L. Mackenzie King
- Preceded by: Brooke Claxton
- Succeeded by: Alfred Johnson Brooks (Acting)

Minister of Labour
- Acting; August 2, 1950 – August 6, 1950
- Prime Minister: Louis St. Laurent
- Preceded by: Humphrey Mitchell
- Succeeded by: Milton Fowler Gregg

Secretary of State for Canada
- In office April 18, 1945 – December 11, 1946
- Prime Minister: W. L. Mackenzie King
- Preceded by: Norman Alexander McLarty
- Succeeded by: Colin W. G. Gibson

Canadian Senator from Ontario
- In office April 20, 1968 – October 30, 1974
- Appointed by: Pierre Trudeau

Member of Parliament for Essex East
- In office October 14, 1935 – April 19, 1968
- Preceded by: Raymond Morand
- Succeeded by: Riding abolished

Personal details
- Born: Joseph James Guillaume Paul Martin; June 23, 1903 Ottawa, Ontario, Canada
- Died: September 14, 1992 (aged 89) Windsor, Ontario, Canada
- Party: Liberal
- Spouse: Eleanor Alice "Nelly" Adams (m. 1937)
- Children: 2, including Paul Martin
- Education: University of Toronto; Osgoode Hall Law School; Graduate Institute of International Studies
- Occupation: Diplomat; Lecturer; Barrister; Lawyer

Joseph James Guillaume Paul Martin (June 23, 1903 – September 14, 1992), often referred to as Paul Martin Sr., was a Canadian lawyer, politician and diplomat. He was the father of Paul Martin, who served as 21st prime minister of Canada from 2003 to 2006.

== Early life ==
Martin was born in Ottawa, Ontario, the son of Lumina (née Chouinard) and Joseph Philippe Ernest Martin. His Irish Catholic paternal grandfather's family immigrated from County Mayo, and his mother and paternal grandmother were French Canadian with deep roots in the country.

Martin contracted polio in 1907, which left him permanently blind in one eye and with a severely weakened left arm.

Martin was raised in Pembroke, Ontario, in the Ottawa River Valley, although he attended high school at Collège Saint-Alexandre in Gatineau, Quebec. He completed his university education at the University of Toronto, and earned his law degree from Osgoode Hall Law School. Later, Martin studied at the Graduate Institute of International Studies, Geneva, on a scholarship.

Martin later opened a law practice in Windsor, Ontario. In 1939–1940, Martin defended the gangster Rocco Perri at his trial for the corruption of public officials. The trial ended on February 1, 1940, with Perri being acquitted. In 1961, he purchased the Devonshire Lodge, a mansion in the Walkerville neighbourhood; he lived there until his death.

== Politics ==
=== Member of Parliament ===
A member of the Liberal Party of Canada, he was first elected to the House of Commons in 1935 and entered the cabinet in 1945. He went on to serve as a noted member of the cabinets of four Prime Ministers: William Lyon Mackenzie King, Louis St. Laurent, Lester B. Pearson and Pierre Trudeau.

Martin was viewed as one of the most left-wing members of the Liberal cabinet, and as Minister of National Health and Welfare from 1946 to 1957 he played an important role in the fight against polio and overseeing the creation of hospital insurance in Canada, and is sometimes recognized as a father of medicare. Martin served as Secretary of State for External Affairs in the Pearson government, and was instrumental in the acquisition of U.S. nuclear weapons for Canadian Forces.

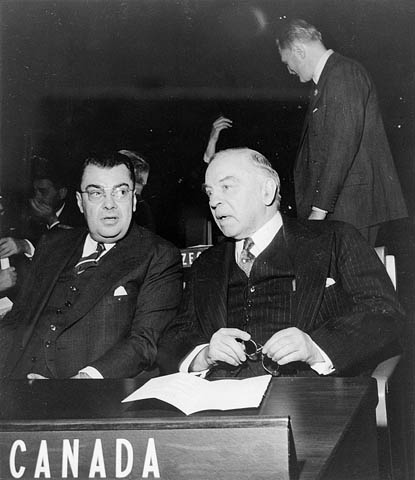
Hon. Paul Martin (left) and Rt. Hon. W. L. Mackenzie King attending the opening session of the United Nations General Assembly, October 23, 1946

=== Liberal leadership bids ===
He ran for the Liberal leadership three times, in 1948, in 1958 and 1968, but was defeated at all three Liberal leadership conventions, first by Louis St. Laurent, then by Lester B. Pearson, then by Pierre Trudeau.

=== Senator and beyond ===
Trudeau appointed him to the Senate in 1968. He served as Leader of the Government in the Senate until 1974 when he was appointed High Commissioner to the United Kingdom. He also served as chancellor of Wilfrid Laurier University from 1972 to 1977, as a result of which the university named the Paul Martin Centre in his honour. Until his death Paul Martin was an adjunct professor of political science at the University of Windsor.

His two volume memoirs, A Very Public Life, was published in 1983 (ISBN 0888790929) and 1986 (OCLC 165756245 A very public life: So many worlds Volume 2 of A very public life at Google Books).

== Honours ==
In 1976 he was made a Companion of the Order of Canada. In recognition of his accomplishments, Martin was granted the right to use the honorific Right Honourable in 1992, a rare honour for one who has never been Prime Minister, Governor-General or Chief Justice of Canada. He died on September 14, at the age of eighty-nine.

The University of Windsor has a Paul Martin Chair in law and political science, recently held by former Manitoba Premier Howard Pawley (until his retirement from the university), and the Paul Martin Law Library. The City of Windsor had also renamed their "Post Office Building" the Paul Martin Sr. Building in his honour on November 18, 1994.

== Honorary degrees ==
Location	Date	School	Degree	Gave Commencement Address
Nova Scotia	1950	Dalhousie University	Doctor of Laws (LL.D)	
Ontario	1952	University of Toronto	Doctor of Laws (LL.D)	
Ontario	Spring 1954	University of Windsor	Doctor of Laws (LL.D)	
Ontario	October 22, 1954	University of Western Ontario	Doctor of Civil Law (DCL)	
British Columbia	June 2, 1966	University of British Columbia	Doctor of Laws (LL.D)	
Ontario	May 1967	Waterloo Lutheran University	Doctor of Laws (LL.D)	
Ontario	1983	Law Society of Upper Canada	Doctor of Laws (LL.D)	
Ontario	June 2017	Algonquin College		Awarded Posthumously commencement address delivered by his son Paul Martin Jr.

== Electoral record ==
Essex East

1935 Canadian federal election
Party	Candidate	Votes	%	±%
Liberal	MARTIN, Paul	7,562	39.25	-4.31
Conservative	MORAND, Hon. Raymond D.	6,493	33.71	-22.73
Co-operative Commonwealth	LEVERT, Joseph Ben	4,106	21.32	
Reconstruction	MCPHARLIN, J. Gabriel	1,102	5.72	
Total valid votes		19,263	100.00	

1940 Canadian federal election
Party	Candidate	Votes	%	±%
Liberal	MARTIN, Paul	9,811	46.39	+7.14
National Government	MORAND, Hon. Raymond D.	8,060	38.11	+4.40
Co-operative Commonwealth	LEVERT, Joseph Ben	2,879	13.62	-7.70
Labour	HICKS, Roy Robert	398	1.88	
Total valid votes		21,148	100.00	

1945 Canadian federal election
Party	Candidate	Votes	%	±%
Liberal	MARTIN, Hon. Paul	16,165	56.21	+9.82
Progressive Conservative	BYRNE, James E.	8,244	28.67	-9.44
Co-operative Commonwealth	MACDONALD, William C.	4,349	15.12	+1.50
Total valid votes		28,758	100.00	

1949 Canadian federal election
Party	Candidate	Votes	%	±%
Liberal	MARTIN, Hon. Paul	16,709	52.89	-3.32
Progressive Conservative	TURNBULL, James Russell	8,204	25.97	-2.70
Co-operative Commonwealth	RIGGS, William Charles	5,213	16.50	+1.38
Labor–Progressive	PRINCE, Cyril	1,464	4.64	
Total valid votes		31,590	100.00	

1953 Canadian federal election
Party	Candidate	Votes	%	±%
Liberal	MARTIN, Hon. Paul	19,946	67.16	+14.27
Progressive Conservative	KENNEDY, Aloysius	5,530	18.62	-7.35
Co-operative Commonwealth	OWEN, Kenneth Edwin	3,013	10.14	-6.36
Labor–Progressive	KENNEDY, Michael J.	1,212	4.08	-0.56
Total valid votes		29,701	100.00	

1957 Canadian federal election
Party	Candidate	Votes	%	±%
Liberal	MARTIN, Hon. Paul	22,023	57.15	-10.01
Progressive Conservative	HICKS, Roy R.	10,593	27.49	+8.87
Co-operative Commonwealth	METEER, Jack	5,917	15.36	+5.22
Total valid votes		38,533	100.00	

1958 Canadian federal election
Party	Candidate	Votes	%	±%
Liberal	MARTIN, Hon. Paul	18,074	41.98	-15.17
Progressive Conservative	HICKS, Roy R.	16,451	38.21	+10.72
Co-operative Commonwealth	BURR, Fred A.	8,530	19.81	+4.45
Total valid votes		43,055	100.00	

1962 Canadian federal election
Party	Candidate	Votes	%	±%
Liberal	MARTIN, Hon. Paul	24,969	58.69	+16.71
New Democratic	DRURY, George	8,888	20.89	+1.08
Progressive Conservative	DEMERS, Roland Lionel	8,210	19.30	-18.91
Social Credit	CORY, T.R.	476	1.12	
Total valid votes		42,543	100.00	

1963 Canadian federal election
Party	Candidate	Votes	%	±%
Liberal	MARTIN, Hon. Paul	25,727	59.82	+1.13
Progressive Conservative	GOURLIE, David	8,894	20.68	+1.38
New Democratic	MCCONVILLE, Hugh	7,648	17.78	-3.11
Social Credit	GIGNAC, Frank	740	1.72	+0.60
Total valid votes		43,009	100.00	

1965 Canadian federal election
Party	Candidate	Votes	%	±%
Liberal	MARTIN, Hon. Paul	26,094	63.78	+3.96
Progressive Conservative	GOURLIE, David	8,142	19.90	-0.78
New Democratic	MCCONVILLE, Hugh	6,133	14.99	-2.79
Communist	MAGNUSON, Bruce A.H.	543	1.33	
Total valid votes		40,912	100.00	

== Archives ==
There is a Paul Joseph Martin fonds at Library and Archives Canada.

== See also ==
- Vive le Québec libre speech
- Paul Martin

Preceded by Norman Alexander McLarty	Secretary of State for Canada; April 18, 1945 – December 12, 1946	Succeeded by Colin William George Gibson
Preceded by Brooke Claxton	Minister of National Health and Welfare; December 12, 1946 – June 20, 1957	Succeeded by Alfred Johnson Brooks
Preceded by Howard Charles Green	Secretary of State for External Affairs; April 22, 1963– April 20, 1968	Succeeded by Mitchell Sharp
Preceded by John Joseph Connolly	Minister Without Portfolio (Leader of the Government in the Senate); April 20, 1968 – April 1, 1969	Succeeded by ---
Preceded by ---	Leader of the Government in the Senate; April 1, 1969 – August 7, 1974	Succeeded by Ray Perrault
Academic offices
Preceded by W. Ross Macdonald	Chancellor of Waterloo Lutheran University/Wilfrid Laurier University; 1972 – 1977	Succeeded by John Black Aird
Diplomatic posts
Preceded by Jake Warren	Canadian High Commissioner to the United Kingdom; 1975–1979	Succeeded by Jean Casselman Wadds
