= Liberal Party of Canada leadership elections =

The first three leaders of the Liberal Party of Canada were not chosen at a leadership convention. Alexander Mackenzie (March 1873 – April 1880) and Edward Blake (May 1880 – June 1887) were chosen by the party caucus. Wilfrid Laurier (June 1887 – February 1919) was also chosen by caucus members with the party convention of 1893 ratifying his leadership. The most recent leadership election was held in 2025.

The first Liberal leadership convention was held on August 7, 1919. Balloting continued until one candidate won a majority of votes. After the 1919 convention, a system was adopted where the candidate with the fewest votes on a given ballot is automatically dropped. More recently, any candidate with less than 5% of the vote on the first ballot is also automatically dropped. Since 1919, time has also been given between ballots for candidates to announce if they wish to withdraw and throw their support to another candidate.

The 2009 Liberal leadership election was the last one in which the leader was chosen by delegates. Future leadership elections were to be conducted according to a weighted one member, one vote system in which all party members could cast ballots but in which they would be counted so that each riding had equal weight. This system, however, has been modified in the 2012 Biennial Convention in Ottawa. In addition to the card-carrying membership, registered supporters, a newly created category of Liberal sympathisers, given the right to vote in their constituency.

== 1919 leadership convention results ==
The 1919 leadership convention was held in Ottawa, Ontario on August 7, 1919.

Delegate support by ballot
Candidate	1st ballot		2nd ballot		5th ballot	
Candidate	Votes cast	%	Votes cast	%	Votes cast	%
William Lyon Mackenzie King	344	36.3%	411	43.8%	476	52.1%
William Stevens Fielding	297	31.3%	344	36.6%	438	47.9%
George Perry Graham	153	16.2%	124	13.2%	Withdrew	
Daniel Duncan McKenzie	153	16.2%	60	6.4%	Withdrew	
Total	947	100.0%	939	100.0%	914	100.0%

Graham withdrew while voting for the third ballot was underway. McKenzie withdrew while voting for the fourth ballot was in process. Votes were not counted for either one, and the convention proceeded directly to the fifth ballot.

== 1948 leadership convention results ==
The 1948 leadership convention was held in Ottawa on August 7, 1948.

First Ballot
Candidate	Delegate Support	Percentage
Louis St. Laurent	848	69.1%
James Garfield Gardiner	323	26.3%
Charles Gavan Power	56	4.6%
Total	1,227	100%

== 1958 leadership convention results ==
The 1958 leadership convention was held in Ottawa on January 16, 1958.

First Ballot
Candidate	Delegate Support	Percentage
Lester B. Pearson	1,074	77.8%
Paul Martin Sr.	305	22.1%
Harold Lloyd Henderson	1	0.1%
Total	1,380	100%

== 1968 leadership convention results ==
The 1968 leadership convention was held in Ottawa Civic Centre in Ottawa, Ontario on April 6, 1968.

Delegate support by Ballot
Candidate	1st ballot		2nd ballot		3rd ballot		4th ballot	
Candidate	Votes cast	%	Votes cast	%	Votes cast	%	Votes cast	%
Pierre Trudeau	752	31.5%	964	40.5%	1,051	44.2%	1,203	50.9%
Paul Hellyer	330	13.8%	465	19.5%	377	15.9%	Endorsed Winters	
Robert Winters	293	12.3%	473	19.9%	621	26.1%	954	40.3%
Paul Martin Sr.	277	11.6%	Did not endorse					
John Turner	277	11.6%	347	14.6%	279	11.8%	195	8.2%
John James Greene	169	7.1%	104	4.4%	29	1.2%	Endorsed Trudeau	
Allan MacEachen	163	6.8%	11	0.5%	Endorsed Trudeau^{[A]}			
Eric Kierans	103	4.3%	Did not endorse					
Harold Lloyd Henderson	0	-	Did not endorse					
Spoiled ballots	24	1.0%	15	0.6%	19	0.8%	13	0.6%
Total	2,390	100.0%	2,379	100.0%	2,376	100.0%	2,365	100.0%

^{A} MacEachen announced after the first ballot that he was withdrawing and would support Trudeau, but he missed the deadline to remove his name from the ballot.

== 1980 leadership convention ==
A leadership convention was scheduled for late March 1980, in Winnipeg, Manitoba but was cancelled due to the fall of the Progressive Conservative government on December 13, 1979 and the calling of the February 18, 1980 federal election. As a result of the snap election call, the Liberal caucus and party executive persuaded Pierre Trudeau to rescind his resignation as party leader and lead the Liberals into the election.

== 1984 leadership convention results ==
The 1984 leadership convention was held in Ottawa on June 16, 1984.

Delegate support by Ballot
Candidate	1st ballot		2nd ballot	
Candidate	Votes cast	%	Votes cast	%
John Turner	1,593	46.4%	1,862	53.9%
Jean Chrétien	1,067	31.1%	1,398	40.5%
Don Johnston	278	8.1%	192	5.6%
John Roberts	185	5.4%	Endorsed Chrétien	
Mark MacGuigan	135	3.9%	Endorsed Turner	
John Munro	93	2.7%	Endorsed Chrétien	
Eugene Whelan	84	2.4%	Endorsed Chrétien	
Spoiled ballots	2	-	1	-
Total	3,437	100.0%	3,453	100.0%

== 1990 leadership convention results ==
The 1990 leadership convention was held in Calgary, Alberta on June 23, 1990.

First Ballot
Candidate	Delegate Support	Percentage
Jean Chrétien	2,652	56.8%
Paul Martin	1,176	25.2%
Sheila Copps	499	10.7%
Tom Wappel	267	5.7%
John Nunziata	64	1.4%
Spoiled ballots	10	0.2%
Total	4,668	100%

== 2003 leadership convention results ==
The 2003 leadership convention was held at the Metro Toronto Convention Centre in Toronto, Ontario on November 13-15, 2003. The contest formally concluded with the announcement of results of the first ballot on Friday November 14, 2003.

First Ballot
Candidate	Delegate Support	Percentage
Paul Martin	3,242	93.8%
Sheila Copps	211	6.1%
Spoiled ballots	2	0.1%
Total	3,455	100%

Source: Parliament of Canada website

== 2006 leadership convention results ==
The 2006 leadership convention was held at the Palais des congrès de Montréal in Montreal, Quebec on December 2–3, 2006.

= Eliminated from next round
= Withdrew nomination
= Winner

Delegate support by Ballot
Candidate	1st ballot		2nd ballot		3rd ballot		4th ballot	
Candidate	Votes cast	%	Votes cast	%	Votes cast	%	Votes cast	%
Michael Ignatieff	1,412	29.3%	1,481	31.8%	1,660	34.5%	2,084	45.3%
Bob Rae	977	20.3%	1,132	24.1%	1.375	28.5%	Released delegates	
Stéphane Dion	856	17.8%	974	20.8%	1.782	37.0%	2,521	54.7%
Gerard Kennedy	854	17.7%	884	18.8%	Endorsed Dion			
Ken Dryden	238	4.9%	219	4.7%	Endorsed Rae			
Scott Brison	192	4.0%	Endorsed Rae					
Joe Volpe	156	3.2%	Withdrew before 1st ballot began; endorsed Rae					
Martha Hall Findlay	130	2.7%	Endorsed Dion					
Total	4,815	100.0%	4,690	100.0%	4,817	100.0%	4,605	100.0%

== 2009 leadership convention results ==
The 2009 leadership convention was held at the Vancouver Convention Centre in Vancouver, British Columbia from April 30-May 3, 2009.

Due to the selection of Michael Ignatieff as interim leader as a result of the 2008–2009 Canadian parliamentary dispute and an agreement by other candidates to withdraw in favour of Ignatieff, the 2009 convention served to ratify Ignatieff's leadership and was not a contested leadership vote. Bob Rae and Dominic LeBlanc withdrew in December 2008 (five months prior to the convention) allowing Ignatieff to become leader by default.

First Ballot
Candidate	Delegate Support	Percentage
Michael Ignatieff	1,964	97%
Spoiled ballots	59	3%
Total	2,023	100%

== 2013 leadership election ==
The leadership election was concluded on April 14, 2013, with results announced on the same day at the Confederation Ballroom at the Westin Hotel in Ottawa, Ontario. The voter turnout was 82% of all registered voters.

First Ballot
Candidate	Votes cast	%	Points allocated	%
Justin Trudeau	81,389	78.76%	24,668.71	80.09%
Joyce Murray	12,148	11.76%	3,130.76	10.16%
Martha Hall Findlay	6,585	6.37%	1,760.43	5.72%
Martin Cauchon	1,630	1.58%	815.86	2.65%
Deborah Coyne	833	0.81%	214.14	0.70%
Karen McCrimmon	757	0.73%	210.08	0.68%
Rejected Ballots	1,210			
Total	104,552	100.00	30,800	100.00

== 2025 leadership election ==
The leadership election was concluded on March 9, 2025, with results being announced at a convention style event at the Rogers Centre Ottawa on the same day. The voter turnout was 92.7% of verified registered party members.

First Ballot
Candidate	Votes cast	%	Points allocated	%
Mark Carney	131,774	86.75%	29,457	85.88%
Chrystia Freeland	11,134	7.33%	2,729	7.96%
Karina Gould	4,785	3.15%	1,100	3.21%
Frank Baylis	4,038	2.66%	1,014	2.96%
Rejected Ballots				
Total	151,899	100.00	34,300	100.00
