= 1958 Liberal Party of Canada leadership election =

Party election in Canada

- January 16, 1958
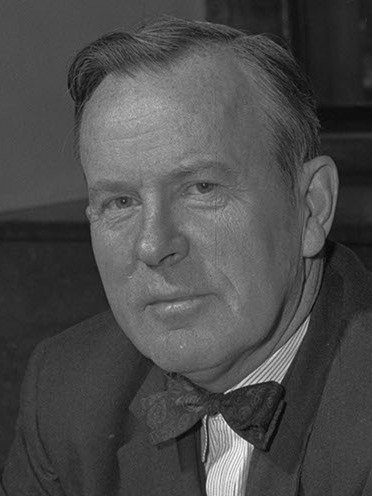

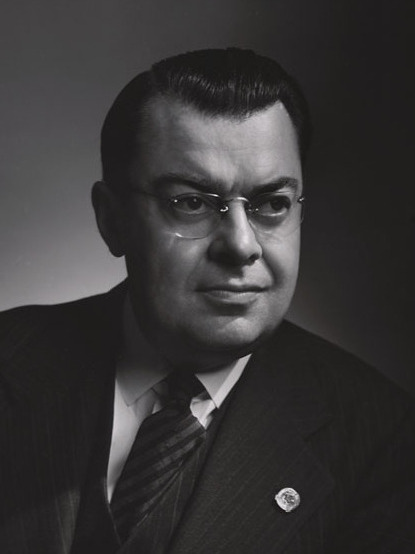
Candidate	Lester B. Pearson	Paul Martin Sr.
Delegate count	1,074	305
Percentage	77.8%	22.1%
Leader before election
Louis St. Laurent
Elected Leader
Lester B. Pearson

1958 Liberal leadership election
- Date: January 16, 1958
- Convention: Ottawa Coliseum, Lansdowne Park, Ottawa, Ontario
- Resigning leader: Louis St. Laurent
- Won by: Lester Pearson
- Ballots: 1
- Candidates: 3

In 1958, the Liberal Party of Canada held a leadership election to replace leader Louis St. Laurent, who had resigned as Prime Minister after the party's defeat in the 1957 election. On the first ballot, former External Affairs minister Lester Pearson defeated former cabinet minister Paul Martin and Mayor of Portage la Prairie, Harold Lloyd Henderson.

== Background ==
The Liberals had held power for 22 years until their defeat in the 1957 federal election on June 10, 1957, which returned a Progressive Conservative minority government. Louis St. Laurent, who had led the Liberals since 1948, announced on September 6, 1957 that he would not be leading the Liberals into another election.

== Candidates ==
- Harold Lloyd Henderson, 51, Mayor of Portage la Prairie, Manitoba.
- Paul Martin Sr., 54, former Minister of National Health and Welfare (1946–1957), MP for Essex East, Ontario since 1935.
- Lester B. Pearson, 60, former Secretary of State for External Affairs (1948–1957), MP for Algoma East, Ontario since 1948.

Donald Hugh Mackay, Mayor of Calgary, withdrew his candidacy a week before the convention. Former Finance Minister Walter Edward Harris, who had lost his seat in the election, had initially been expected to be Pearson's main competitor but did not run. Newfoundland MP and former Minister for Citizenship and Immigration Jack Pickersgill was also expected to run but did not stand. Other names mentioned as possible candidates were former Fisheries Minister and British Columbia MP James Sinclair (Coast—Capilano), former Transport Minister and Montreal MP George Carlyle Marler (Saint-Antoine—Westmount), and former Public Works Minister Robert Winters who had lost his Queens—Lunenburg, Nova Scotia seat in the election.

Pearson was the choice of the party establishment, had strong support from MPs in Quebec and Toronto, and won overwhelmingly on the first ballot and was also helped by being awarded the 1957 Nobel Peace Prize weeks before the convention. Martin, who had been on the left of the St. Laurent cabinet, attempted to appeal to the rank-and-file,

== Results ==
First Ballot
Candidate	Delegate Support	Percentage
Lester B. Pearson	1,074	77.8%
Paul Martin Sr.	305	22.1%
Harold Lloyd Henderson	1	0.1%
Total	1,380	100%

First ballot
Pearson	77.83%
Martin	22.10%
Henderson	0.07%
