= Harold Lloyd Henderson =

Canadian Presbyterian minister and politician

Mayor of Portage la Prairie
- In office 1947–1966
- In office 1971–1974

Personal details
- Born: June 1907; Freeland, Prince Edward Island, Canada
- Died: January 18, 1993 (aged 85); Portage la Prairie, Manitoba, Canada
- Political party: Liberal
- Spouse: Mary Evelyn Davis
- Education: Prince of Wales College; McGill University; The Presbyterian College, Montreal

Harold Lloyd Henderson (June 1907 – 18 January 1993) was a Presbyterian minister and politician in Manitoba, Canada.

== Life ==
Harold Lloyd Henderson was born in Freeland, Prince Edward Island, in June 1907, to Annie and Robert Cummings Henderson. He graduated from Prince of Wales College, McGill University with a Master of Arts degree, and The Presbyterian College, Montreal. He was offered a teaching position at University of Toronto, but chose to become a minister. He was ordained as a Presbytery minister in 1942. He married Mary Evelyn Davis.

Henderson was elected to the Portage la Prairie council in 1945.

Henderson ran as an independent candidate in a 1946 by-election in Portage la Prairie.

Henderson was the only mayor in Canada to not adopt a principle of submission to the federal government.

Henderson ran to be leader of the Liberal Party of Canada in 1958. He spent $1,000 on his campaign, but stated that he knew he would not win. He received one vote for the leadership. He unsuccessfully sought the leadership position again in 1968. He also ran to be leader of the Manitoba Liberal Party three times.

Henderson was the Liberal candidate for Portage—Neepawa in the 1958 federal election.

Henderson served as mayor of Portage la Prairie from 1947 to 1966, and from 1971 to 1974. He was defeated by William A. Linden in 1967.

He died in Portage la Prairie on 18 January 1993.
