= Liberal Party of Canada =

Federal political party

Liberal Party of Canada Parti libéral du Canada
- Abbreviation: LPC; PLC
- Leader: Mark Carney
- President: Sachit Mehra
- House leader: Steven MacKinnon
- Founder: George Brown
- Founded: July 1, 1867 (159 years, 142 days)
- Merger of: Parti rouge Clear Grits
- Headquarters: Constitution Square; 350 Albert Street; Suite 920; Ottawa, Ontario; K1P 6M8
- Youth wing: Young Liberals of Canada
- Factions: Blue Grits (Note: Blue Grits are the conservative liberal faction of the party.)
- Membership (2025): ▲ ~400,000 (Note: The Liberal Party of Canada does not have a paid membership, but instead offers the ability to "register" as a Liberal for free of cost.)
- Ideology: Liberalism (Canadian); Social liberalism
- Political position: Centre to centre-left
- International affiliation: Liberal International
- Colours: Red
- Slogan: Canada Strong (2025)
- Senate (Note: All Liberal senators were expelled from the party's parliamentary caucus in 2014. Those senators, who had been appointed by Liberal prime ministers up to and including Paul Martin, sat from 2014 to 2019 as the Senate Liberal Caucus, which was not affiliated to or recognized by the Liberal Party. The Senate Liberal Caucus was dissolved in 2019 and replaced by the Progressive Senate Group. Senators appointed since 2015 by Justin Trudeau have affiliated with an independent parliamentary group or sat as non-affiliated members. Five senators represent the Government Representative's Office working group, all appointed by Justin Trudeau.): 0 / 105
- House of Commons: 173 / 343

Website
- liberal.ca

The Liberal Party of Canada (LPC; French: Parti libéral du Canada; PLC) is a federal political party in Canada. The Liberal Party espouses the principles of liberalism, and generally sits at the centre to centre-left of the Canadian political spectrum, with their main rival, the Conservative Party, positioned to their right and the New Democratic Party positioned to their left. The party is often described as a "big tent", practising "brokerage politics", (Note: Brokerage politics is "a Canadian term for successful big tent parties that embody a pluralistic catch-all approach to appeal to the median Canadian voter ... adopting centrist policies and electoral coalitions to satisfy the short-term preferences of a majority of electors who are not located on the ideological fringe.") attracting support from a broad spectrum of voters. The Liberal Party is the oldest active federal political party in the country, and has dominated the federal politics of Canada for much of its history. As a result, it has sometimes been referred to as Canada's "natural governing party". It has been the governing party since 2015; Mark Carney has been its leader and the Prime Minister of Canada since March 2025.

The party has been in continual existence since the confederation of Canada in 1867. The party first came into power in 1873, with the party's first official leader Alexander Mackenzie leading the nation for five years. Following close to 20 years in opposition, Wilfrid Laurier led the party to victory in 1896 and facilitated many compromises between English and French Canada that shaped the bilingual nation during his 15-year premiership.

During William Lyon Mackenzie King's 29 years as party leader, the party was in government from 1921 to 1926, from 1926 to 1930, and from 1935 to 1948. In the half century between 1935 and 1984, the party was in power for all but seven years, winning elections under King, Louis St. Laurent, Lester B. Pearson, and Pierre Trudeau, leading the country through a period of significant expansion of the Canadian welfare state and the emergence of Canada as an independent voice in international affairs. In 1984, the Liberals suffered a landslide defeat to the Progressive Conservatives.

The party returned to government from 1993 to 2006 led by Jean Chrétien and then Paul Martin, who combined social liberalism with fiscal conservatism through a Third Way philosophy. It suffered its worst electoral defeat in 2011, the only federal election as of 2026 in which the Liberals failed to attain the status of government or Official Opposition. The Liberals returned to power in 2015 led by Justin Trudeau, son of the previous prime minister Trudeau. He was succeeded by Mark Carney as party leader in March 2025, who was appointed Prime Minister that month.

The Liberals' signature policies and legislative decisions include the establishment of the Royal Canadian Navy in 1910; the introduction of Canadian citizenship; equalization payments; the Canada Student Loan Program; the Canada Pension Plan; universal health care; the creation of the Maple Leaf flag; the unification of the armed forces in 1968; expanded access to abortion; the Official Languages Act; the patriation of the Constitution of Canada and the establishment of the Canadian Charter of Rights and Freedoms; gun control; the Clarity Act; campaign and political finance reform; the legalization of same-sex marriage, euthanasia, and recreational cannabis; federal carbon pricing; a national early learning and child care program; a national school food program; the Canadian Dental Care Plan; and the beginning of national pharmacare.

== History ==
=== 19th century ===
==== Origins ====
The Liberals are descended from the mid-19th century Reformers who advocated for responsible government throughout British North America. These included George Brown, Alexander Mackenzie, Robert Baldwin, William Lyon Mackenzie and the Clear Grits in Upper Canada, Joseph Howe in Nova Scotia, and the Patriotes and Rouges in Lower Canada led by figures such as Louis-Joseph Papineau. The Clear Grits and Parti rouge sometimes functioned as a united bloc in the legislature of the Province of Canada beginning in 1854, but a united Liberal Party combining both English and French Canadian members was not formed until 1867. Their lineage from the Clear Grits led to modern Liberals being nicknamed "Grits".

==== Confederation ====
At the time of Confederation of the former British colonies of Canada (now Ontario and Quebec), New Brunswick, and Nova Scotia, the radical Liberals were marginalized by the more pragmatic Conservative coalition assembled under Sir John A. Macdonald. In the 29 years after Confederation, the Liberals were consigned to opposition, with the exception of one stint in government. Alexander Mackenzie was the de facto leader of the Official Opposition after Confederation and finally agreed to become the first official leader of the Liberal Party in 1873. He was able to lead the party to power for the first time in 1873, after the Macdonald government resigned over the Pacific Scandal. Mackenzie subsequently won the 1874 election and served as prime minister for an additional four years. During the five years the Liberal government brought in many reforms, including the replacement of open voting by secret ballot, confining elections to one day and the creation of the Supreme Court of Canada, the Royal Military College of Canada, and the Office of the Auditor General; however, the party was only able to build a solid support base in Ontario and in 1878 lost the government to Macdonald. The Liberals would spend the next 18 years in opposition.

==== Wilfrid Laurier ====
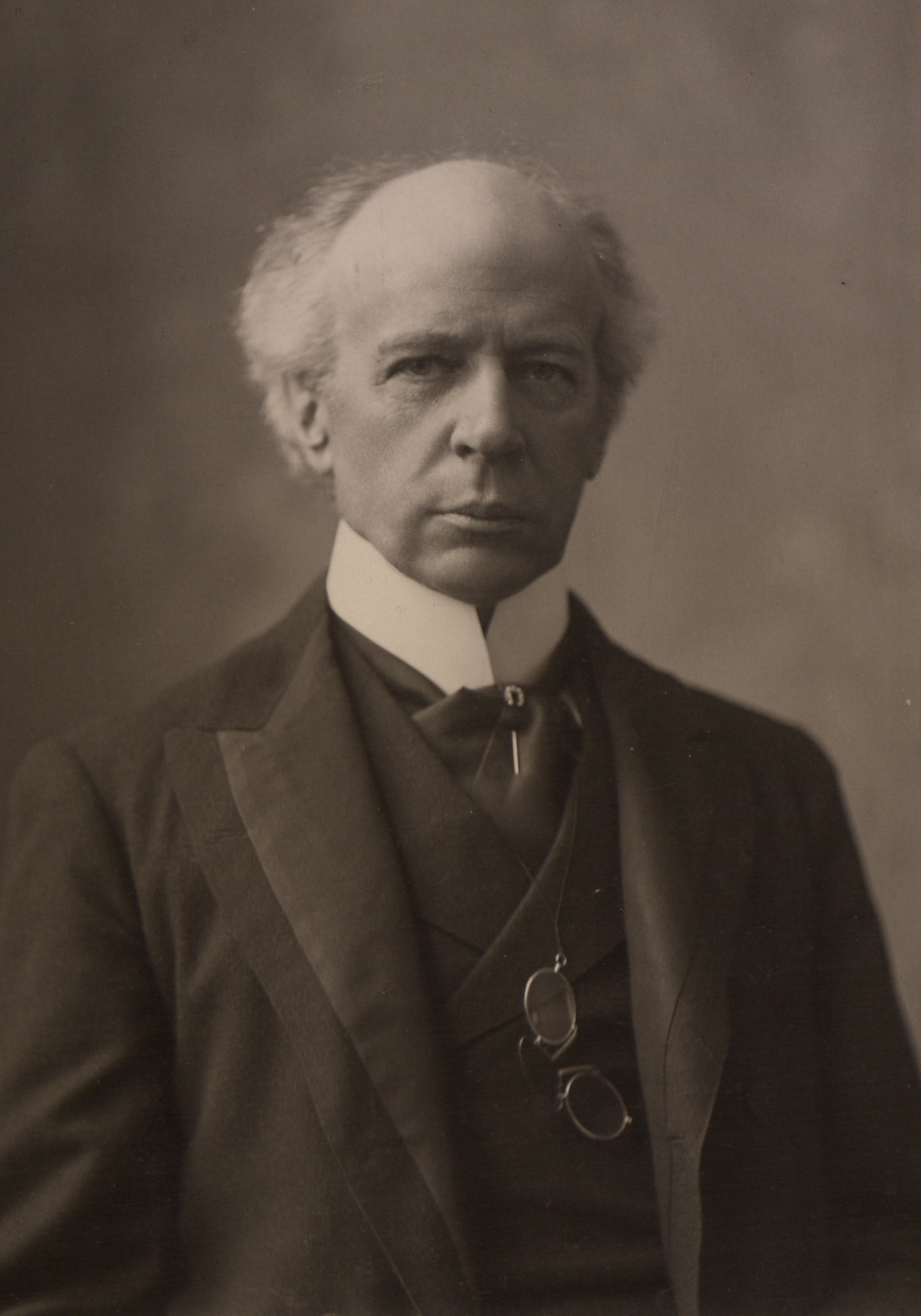
Sir Wilfrid Laurier, the 7th prime minister of Canada (1896–1911)

In their early history, the Liberals were the party of continentalism and opposition to imperialism. The Liberals also became identified with the aspirations of Quebecers as a result of the growing hostility of French Canadians to the Conservatives. The Conservatives lost the support of French Canadians because of the role of Conservative governments in the execution of Louis Riel and their role in the Conscription Crisis of 1917, and especially their opposition to French schools in provinces besides Quebec.

It was not until Wilfrid Laurier became leader that the Liberal Party emerged as a modern party. Laurier was able to capitalize on the Conservatives' alienation of French Canada by offering the Liberals as a credible alternative. Laurier was able to overcome the party's reputation for anti-clericalism that offended the still-powerful Quebec Roman Catholic Church. In English-speaking Canada, the Liberal Party's support for reciprocity made it popular among farmers, and helped cement the party's hold in the growing prairie provinces.

Laurier led the Liberals to power in the 1896 election (in which he became the first Francophone Prime Minister) and oversaw a government that increased immigration to settle Western Canada. Laurier's government created the provinces of Saskatchewan and Alberta out of the North-West Territories and promoted the development of Canadian industry.

=== 20th century ===
==== Organization ====
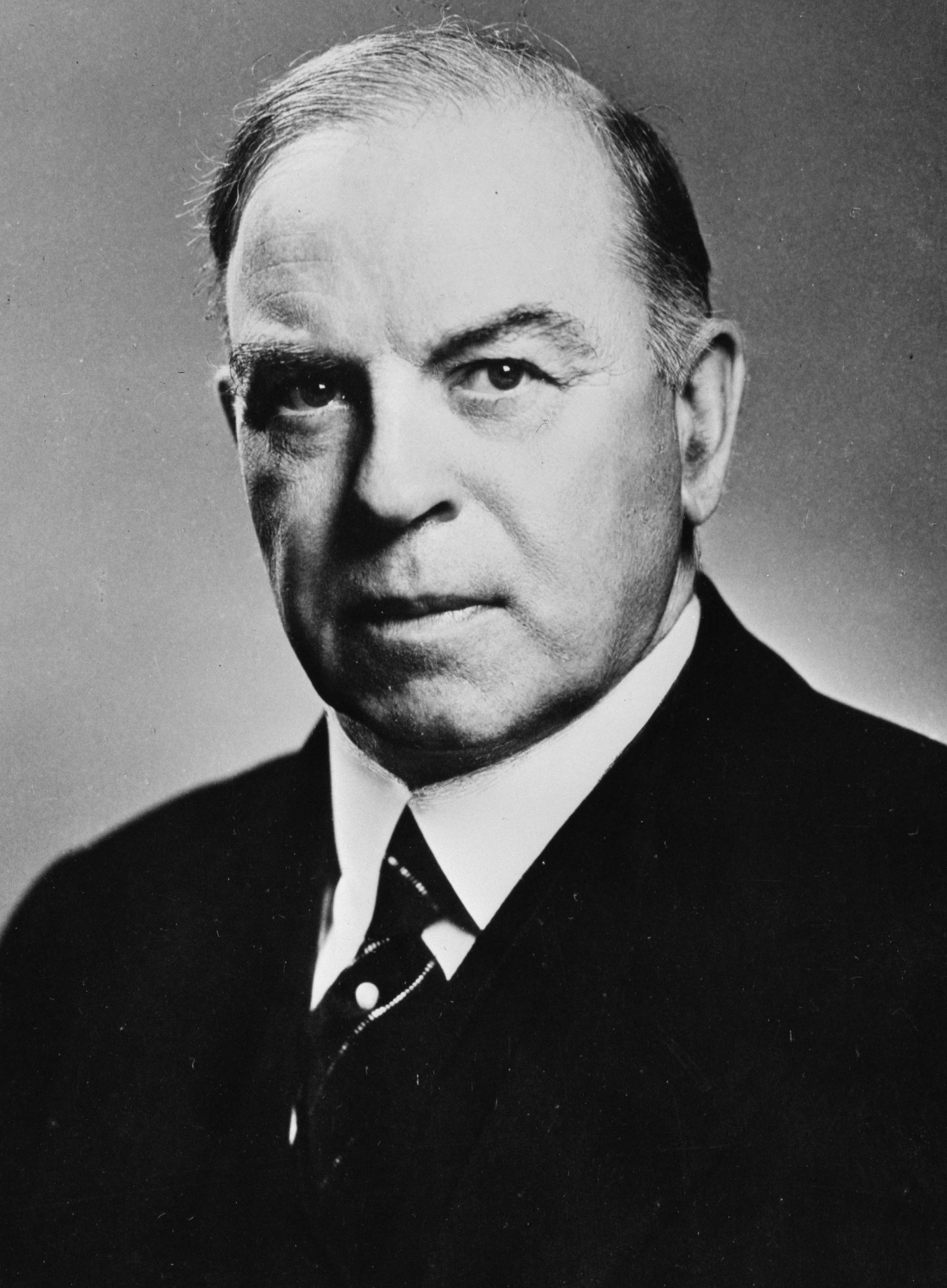
William Lyon Mackenzie King, the 10th prime minister of Canada (1921–1926, 1926–1930, 1935–1948)

Until the early part of the century, the Liberal Party was a loose coalition of local, provincial, and regional bodies with a strong national party leader and caucus, but with an informal and regionalized extra-parliamentary organizational structure. There was no national membership of the party. An individual became a member by joining a provincial Liberal party. Laurier called the party's first national convention in 1893 to unite Liberal supporters behind a programme and build the campaign that successfully brought the party to power in 1896, but no efforts were made to create a formal national organization outside Parliament.

As a result of the party's defeats in the 1911 and 1917 federal elections, Laurier attempted to organize the party on a national level by creating three bodies: the Central Liberal Information Office, the National Liberal Advisory Committee, and the National Liberal Organization Committee. However, the advisory committee became dominated by members of Parliament and all three bodies were underfunded and competed with both local and provincial Liberal associations and the national caucus for authority. The party did organize the national party's second convention in 1919 to elect William Lyon Mackenzie King as Laurier's successor (Canada's first leadership convention), yet following the party's return to power in the 1921 federal election the nascent national party organizations were eclipsed by powerful ministers and local party organizations largely driven by patronage.

As a result of both the party's defeat in the 1930 federal election and the Beauharnois scandal, which highlighted the need for distance between the Liberal Party's parliamentary wing and campaign fundraising, a central coordinating organization, the National Liberal Federation, was created in 1932 with Vincent Massey as its first president. With the Liberal return to power, the national organization languished except for occasional national committee meetings, such as in 1943 when Mackenzie King called a meeting of the federation (consisting of the national caucus and up to seven voting delegates per province) to approve a new platform for the party in anticipation of the end of World War II and prepare for a post-war election. No national convention was held, however, until 1948; the Liberal Party held only three national conventions prior to the 1950s – in 1893, 1919 and 1948. The National Liberal Federation remained largely dependent on provincial Liberal parties and was often ignored and bypassed the parliamentary party in the organization of election campaigns and the development of policy. With the defeat of the Liberals in the 1957 federal election and in particular 1958, reformers argued for the strengthening of the national party organization so it would not be dependent on provincial Liberal parties and patronage. A national executive and Council of presidents, consisting of the presidents of each Liberal riding association, were developed to give the party more co-ordination and national party conventions were regularly held in biennially where previously they had been held infrequently. Over time, provincial Liberal parties in most provinces were separated from provincial wings of the federal party and in a number of cases disaffiliated. By the 1980s, the National Liberal Federation was officially known as the Liberal Party of Canada.

==== Canadian sovereignty ====
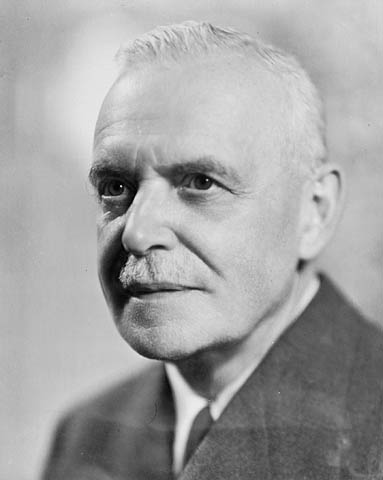
Louis St. Laurent, the 12th prime minister of Canada (1948–1957)

Under Laurier, and his successor William Lyon Mackenzie King, the Liberals promoted Canadian sovereignty and greater independence within the British Commonwealth. In Imperial Conferences held throughout the 1920s, Canadian Liberal governments often took the lead in arguing that the United Kingdom and the dominions should have equal status, and against proposals for an 'imperial parliament' that would have subsumed Canadian independence. After the King–Byng Affair of 1926, the Liberals argued that the Governor General of Canada should no longer be appointed on the recommendation of the British government. The decisions of the Imperial Conferences were formalized in the Statute of Westminster, which was actually passed in 1931, the year after the Liberals lost power.

The Liberals also promoted the idea of Canada being responsible for its own foreign and defence policy. Initially, it was Britain which determined external affairs for the dominion. In 1905, Laurier created the Department of External Affairs, and in 1909 he advised Governor General Earl Grey to appoint the first Secretary of State for External Affairs to Cabinet. It was also Laurier who first proposed the creation of a Canadian Navy in 1910. Mackenzie King recommended the appointment by Governor General Lord Byng of Vincent Massey as the first Canadian ambassador to Washington in 1926, marking the Liberal government's insistence on having direct relations with the United States, rather than having Britain act on Canada's behalf.

==== Social safety net ====
In the period just before and after the Second World War, the party became a champion of 'progressive social policy'. As prime minister for most of the time between 1921 and 1948, King introduced several measures that led to the creation of Canada's social safety net. Bowing to popular pressure, he introduced the mother's allowance, a monthly payment to all mothers with young children. He also reluctantly introduced old age pensions when J. S. Woodsworth required it in exchange for his Co-operative Commonwealth Federation party's support of King's minority government.

Louis St. Laurent succeeded King as Liberal leader on August 7, 1948, and as prime minister on November 15, 1948. In the 1949 and 1953 federal elections, St. Laurent led the Liberal Party to two large majority governments. As prime minister he oversaw the joining of Newfoundland in Confederation as Canada's tenth province, he established equalization payments to the provinces, and continued with social reform with improvements in pensions and health insurance. In 1956, Canada played an important role in resolving the Suez Crisis, and contributed to the United Nations force in the Korean War. Canada enjoyed economic prosperity during St. Laurent's premiership and wartime debts were paid off. The Pipeline Debate proved the Liberal Party's undoing. Their attempt to pass legislation to build a natural gas pipeline from Alberta to central Canada was met with fierce disagreement in the House of Commons. In 1957, John Diefenbaker's Progressive Conservatives won a minority government and St. Laurent resigned as prime minister and Liberal leader.

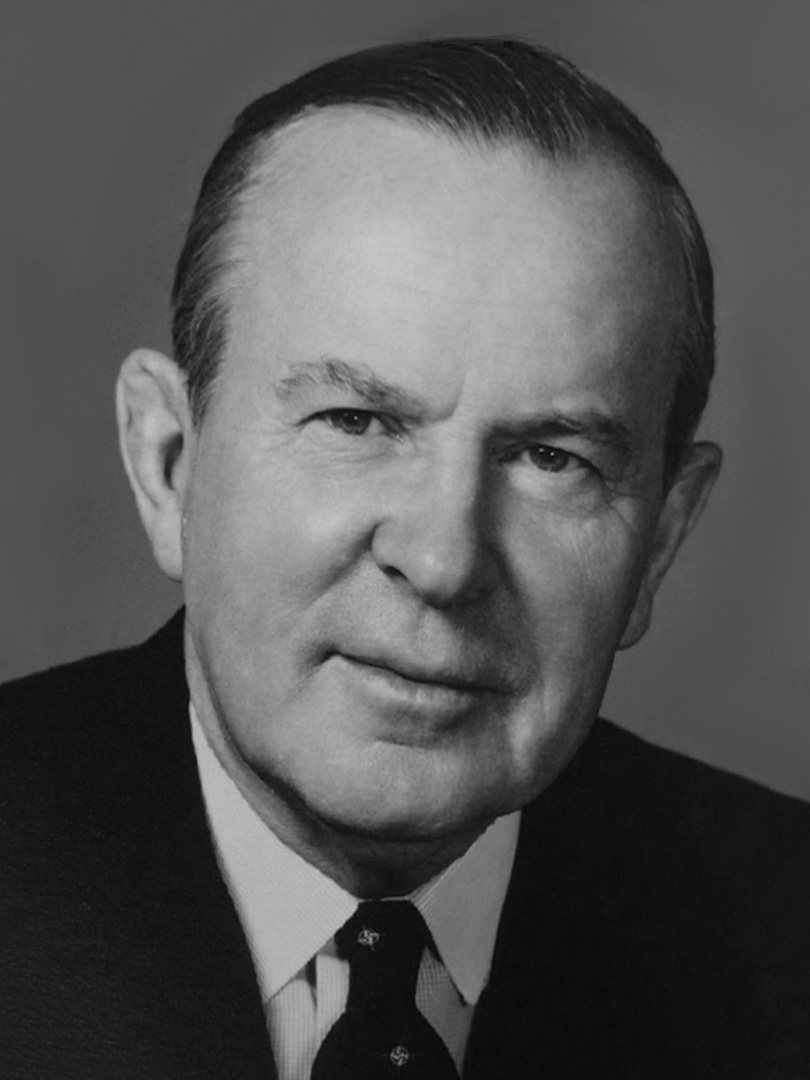
Lester B. Pearson, the 14th prime minister of Canada (1963–1968)

Lester B. Pearson was easily elected Liberal leader at the party's 1958 leadership convention. However, only months after becoming Liberal leader, Pearson led the party into the 1958 federal election that saw Diefenbaker's Progressive Conservatives win the largest majority government, by percentage of seats, in Canadian history. The Progressive Conservatives won 208 of the 265 seats in the House of Commons, while the Liberals were reduced to just 48 seats. Pearson remained Liberal leader during this time and in the 1962 election managed to reduce Diefenbaker to a minority government. In the 1963 election Pearson led the Liberal Party back to victory, forming a minority government. Pearson served as prime minister for five years, winning a second election in 1965. While Pearson's leadership was considered poor and the Liberal Party never held a majority of the seats in parliament during his premiership, he left office in 1968 with an impressive legacy. Pearson's government introduced Medicare, a new immigration act, the Canada Pension Plan, Canada Student Loans, the Canada Assistance Plan, and adopted the Maple Leaf as Canada's national flag.

==== Pierre Trudeau ====
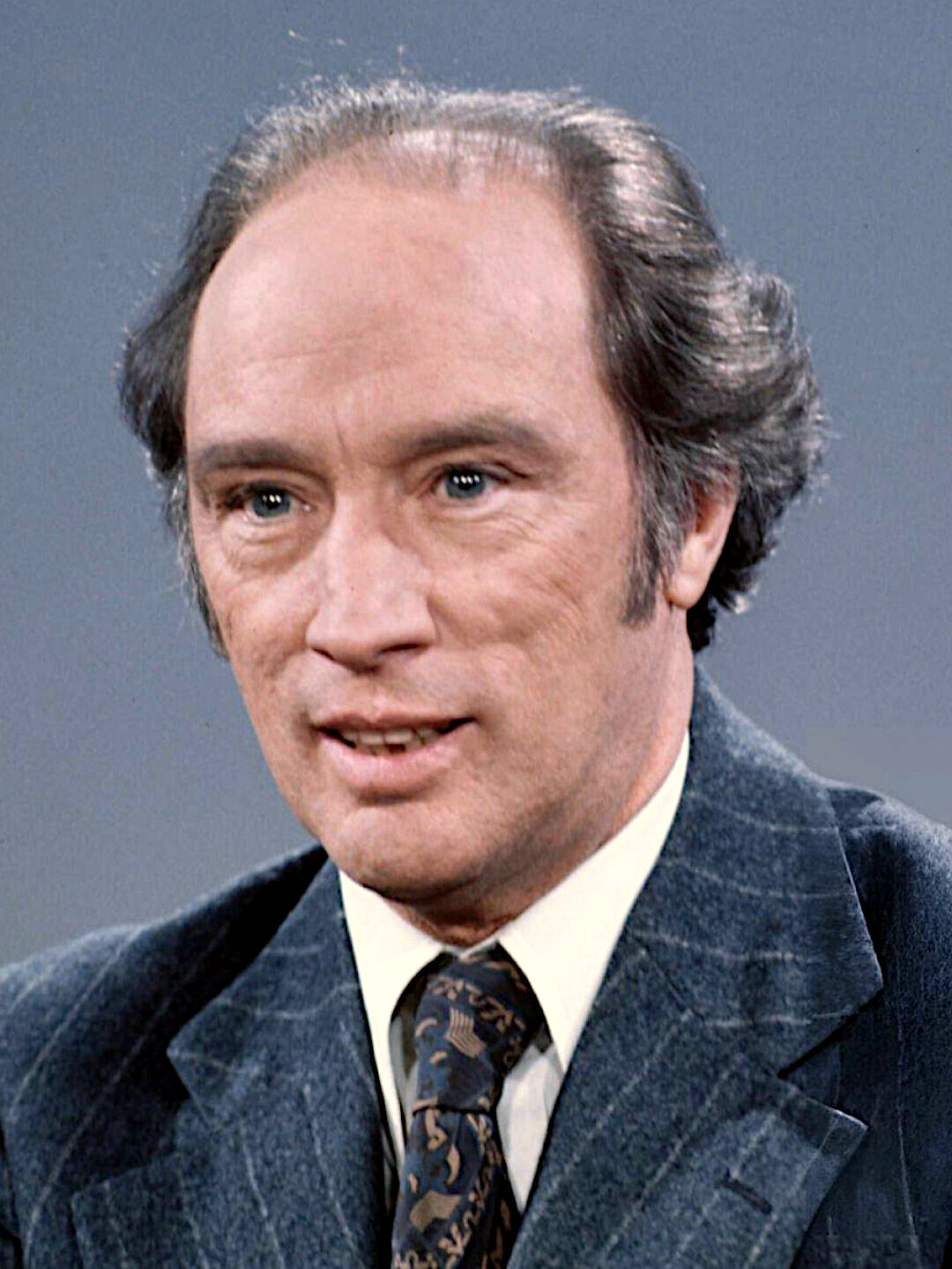
Pierre Trudeau, the 15th prime minister of Canada (1968–1979, 1980–1984)

Under Pierre Trudeau, the mission of a progressive social policy evolved into the goal of creating a "just society". In the late 1970s, Trudeau stated that his Liberal Party adhered to the "radical centre".

The Liberal Party under Trudeau promoted official bilingualism and passed the Official Languages Act, which gave French and English languages equal status in Canada. Trudeau hoped that the promotion of bilingualism would cement Quebec's place in Confederation, and counter growing calls for an independent Quebec. The party hoped the policy would transform Canada into a country where English and French Canadians could live together, and allow Canadians to move to any part of the country without having to lose their language. Although this vision has yet to fully materialize, official bilingualism has helped to halt the decline of the French language outside of Quebec, and to ensure that all federal government services (including radio and television services provided by the government-owned Canadian Broadcasting Corporation/Radio-Canada) are available in both languages throughout the country.

The Trudeau Liberals are also credited with support for state multiculturalism as a means of integrating immigrants into Canadian society without forcing them to shed their culture, leading the party to build a base of support among recent immigrants and their children. This marked the culmination of a decades-long shift in Liberal immigration policy, a reversal of pre-war racial attitudes that spurred discriminatory policies such as the Chinese Immigration Act of 1923 and the MS St. Louis incident.

Trudeau-era wordmark and logo

The most lasting effect of the Trudeau years has been the patriation of the Constitution of Canada and the creation of the Canadian Charter of Rights and Freedoms. Trudeau's Liberals supported the concept of a strong, central government, and fought Quebec separatism, other forms of Quebec nationalism, and the granting of "distinct society" status to Quebec; however, such actions served as rallying cries for sovereigntists, and alienated many Francophone Quebeckers.

==== John Turner ====
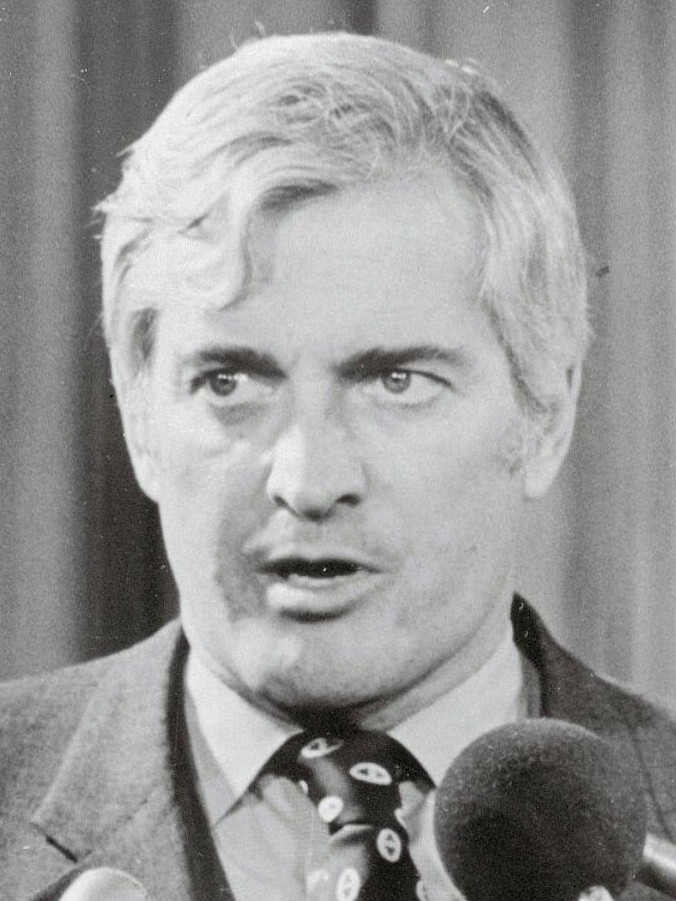
John Turner, the 17th prime minister of Canada (June – September 1984)

Liberal Party logo in 1984

After Trudeau's retirement in 1984, many Liberals, such as Jean Chrétien and Clyde Wells, continued to adhere to Trudeau's concept of federalism. Others, such as John Turner, supported the failed Meech Lake and Charlottetown Constitutional Accords, which would have recognized Quebec as a "distinct society" and would have increased the powers of the provinces to the detriment of the federal government.

Trudeau stepped down as prime minister and party leader in 1984, as the Liberals were slipping in polls. At that year's leadership convention, Turner defeated Chrétien on the second ballot to become party leader and (following Trudeau's resignation) prime minister. Immediately, upon taking office, Turner called a snap election, citing favourable internal polls. However, the party was hurt by numerous patronage appointments, many of which Turner had made supposedly in return for Trudeau retiring early. Also, they were unpopular in their traditional stronghold of Quebec because of the constitution repatriation which excluded that province. The Liberals lost power in the 1984 election, and were reduced to only 40 seats in the House of Commons. The Progressive Conservatives won a majority of the seats in every province, including Quebec. The 95-seat loss was the worst defeat in the party's history, and the worst defeat at the time for a governing party at the federal level. What was more, the New Democratic Party, successor to the Co-operative Commonwealth Federation, won only ten fewer seats than the Liberals, and some thought that the NDP under Ed Broadbent would push the Liberals to third-party status.

The party began a long process of reconstruction. A small group of young Liberal MPs, known as the Rat Pack, gained fame by criticizing the Progressive Conservative government of Brian Mulroney at every turn. Also, despite public and backroom attempts to remove Turner as leader, he managed to consolidate his leadership at the 1986 review.

The 1988 election was notable for Turner's strong opposition to the Canada-U.S. Free Trade Agreement negotiated by Progressive Conservative Prime Minister Brian Mulroney. Although most Canadians voted for parties opposed to free trade, Mulroney's "Tories" were returned with a majority government, and implemented the deal. The Liberals recovered from their near-meltdown of 1984, however, winning 83 seats and ending much of the talk of being eclipsed by the NDP, who won 43 seats.

==== Jean Chrétien ====
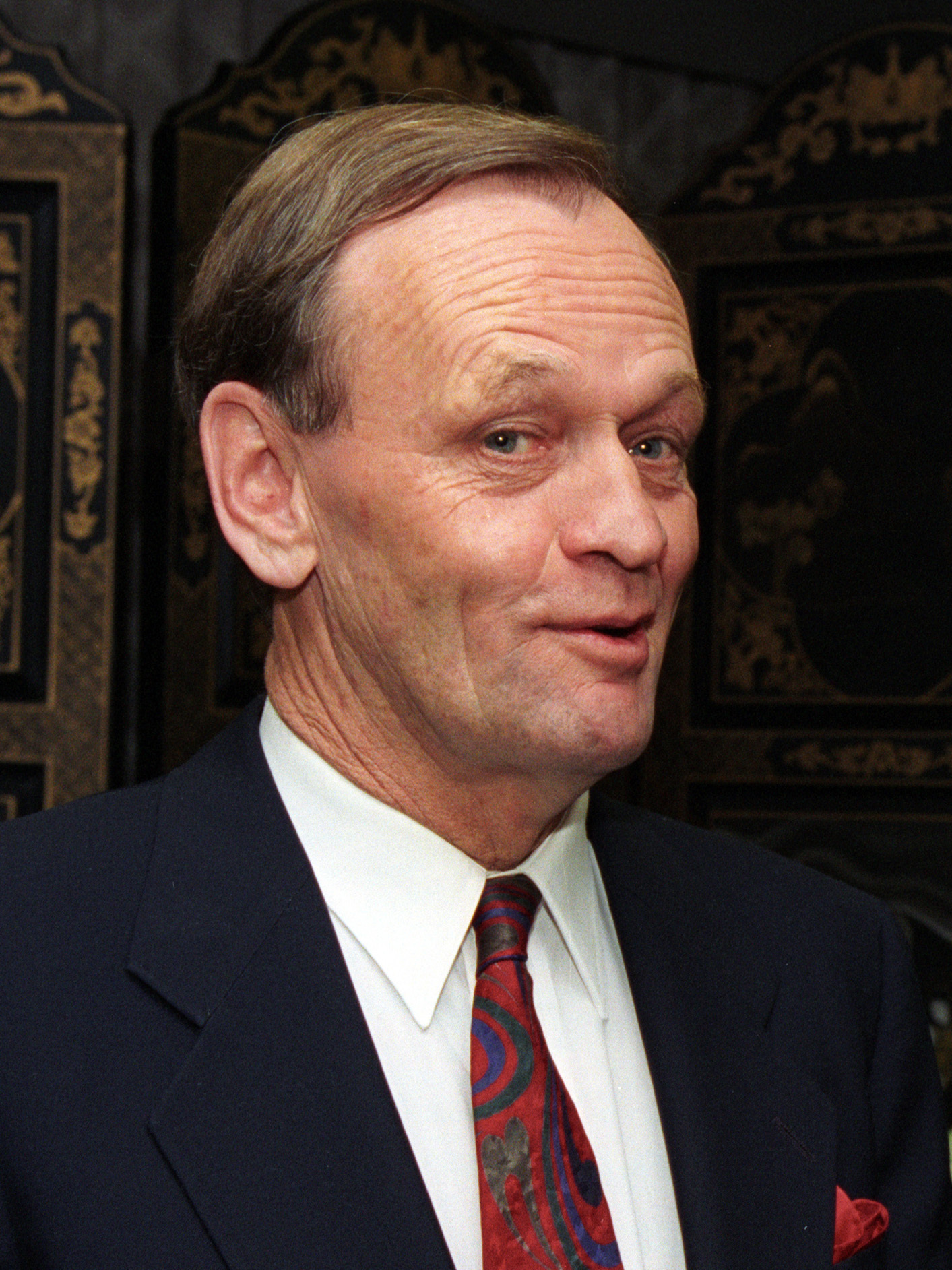
Jean Chrétien, the 20th prime minister of Canada (1993–2003)

Turner announced that he would resign as leader of the Liberal Party on May 3, 1989. The Liberal Party set a leadership convention for June 23, 1990, in Calgary. Five candidates contested the leadership of the party, with former Deputy Prime Minister Jean Chrétien, who had served in every Liberal cabinet since 1965, and Paul Martin, MP and former CEO of Canada Steamship Lines, as the frontrunners. A key moment in that race took place at an all-candidates debate in Montreal, where the discussion quickly turned to the Meech Lake Accord. Martin, favouring Meech, attempted to force Chrétien to abandon his nuanced position on the deal and declare for or against it. When Chrétien refused to endorse the deal, young Liberal delegates crowding the hall began to chant "vendu" ("sellout" in French) and "Judas" at Chrétien. The incident damaged Chrétien's reputation in Quebec, and lead to a lasting animosity between Chrétien and Martin. Chrétien won on the first ballot.

Chrétien's Liberals campaigned in the 1993 election on the promise of renegotiating the North American Free Trade Agreement (NAFTA), and eliminating the Goods and Services Tax (GST). Just after the writ was dropped for the election, they issued the Red Book, an integrated and coherent approach to economic, social, environmental and foreign policy. This was unprecedented for a Canadian party. Taking full advantage of the inability of Mulroney's successor, Kim Campbell, to overcome a large amount of antipathy toward Mulroney, they won a strong majority government with 177 seats—the third-best performance in party history, and their best since 1949. The Progressive Conservatives were cut down to only two seats, suffering a defeat even more severe than the one they had handed the Liberals nine years earlier. The Liberals were re-elected with a considerably reduced majority in 1997, but nearly tied their 1993 total in 2000. To this date, Chrétien is the last Liberal prime minister to secure a majority in three federal elections.

For the next decade, the Liberals dominated Canadian politics in a fashion not seen since the early years of Confederation. This was because of the splintering of the Progressive Conservative's electoral coalition. The PCs' Western support, for all practical purposes, transferred en masse to the Western-based Reform Party, which replaced the PCs as the largest right-wing party in Canada; however, the party was unable to overcome perceptions of extremism and that it was merely a Western protest party, and was virtually non-existent east of Manitoba. Meanwhile, the Quebec nationalists who had once supported the Tories largely switched their support to the sovereigntist Bloc Québécois, while the Tories' Ontario support largely moved to the Liberals. With a divided opposition, the Liberals were able to reap large majorities—especially in Ontario, where the party won all but one seat in 1993, all but two in 1997 and all but three in 2000. However, there was some disappointment as Liberals were not able to recover their traditional dominant position in Quebec, despite being led by a Quebecer.

Liberal Party logo, 1992–2004

While the Chrétien Liberals campaigned from the left, their time in power is most marked by the cuts made to many social programs, including health transfers, in order to balance the federal budget. Although Chrétien had supported the Charlottetown Accord while in opposition, in government he opposed major concessions to Quebec and other provincialist factions. In contrast to their promises during the 1993 campaign, they implemented only minor changes to NAFTA, embraced the free trade concept and—with the exception of the replacement of the GST with the Harmonized Sales Tax in some Atlantic provinces—broke their promise to replace the GST.

After a proposal for Quebec independence was narrowly defeated in the 1995 Quebec referendum, the Liberals passed the "Clarity Act", which outlines the federal government's preconditions for negotiating provincial independence. In Chrétien's final term, he supported same-sex marriage, decriminalizing the possession of small quantities of marijuana, and ratified the Kyoto Protocol. On March 17, 2003, Chrétien announced that Canada would not support the invasion of Iraq, which caused friction with the United States. However, a poll conducted by EKOS for the Toronto Star and La Presse shortly afterwards showed widespread approval of Chrétien's decision by the Canadian public: 71 per cent of those questioned approved of the government's decision to not enter the United States-led invasion, with 27 per cent expressing disapproval.

In Chrétien's final weeks as prime minister, he introduced legislation to reduce the maximum allowable donation to a political party or candidate to $5,000. The move came as a surprise even to Liberal supporters, as Chrétien had not done anything about election financing at any other point in his ten years in office. Political observers suggested that the move allowed Chrétien to retire on a positive note while saddling Martin, his longstanding rival and successor, with the burden of having to fight an election under the strict new rules.

=== 21st century ===
==== Paul Martin ====
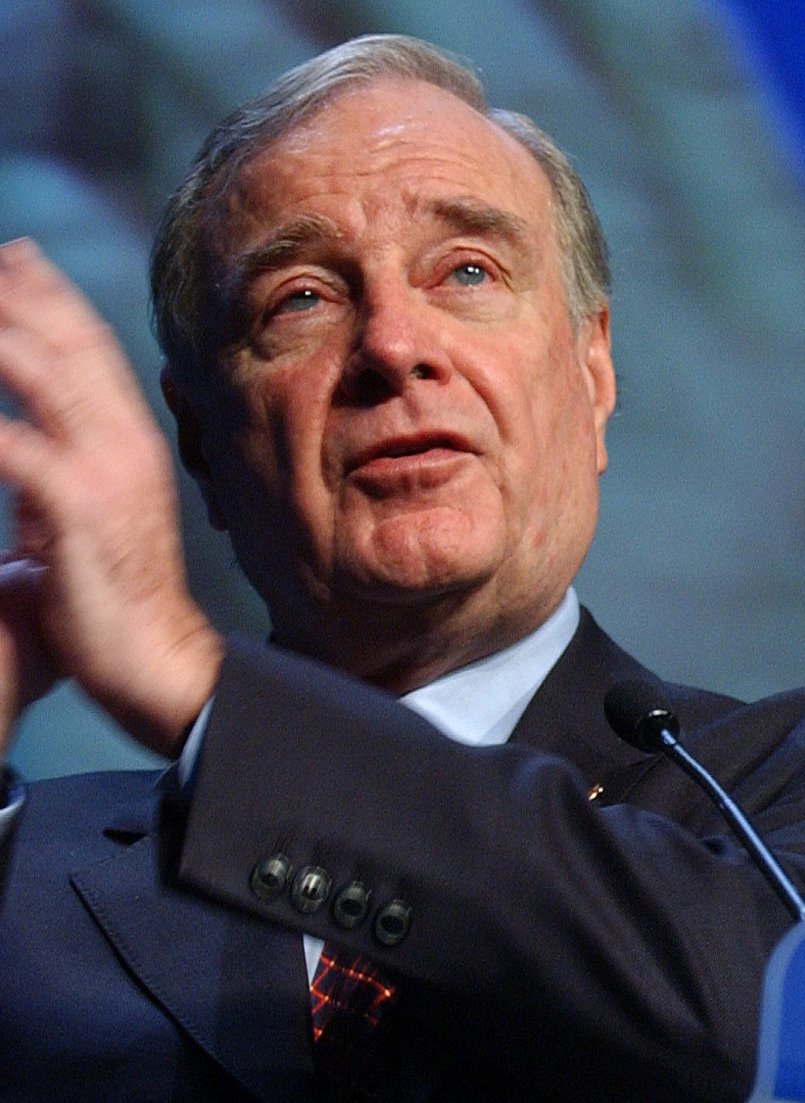
Paul Martin, the 21st prime minister of Canada (2003–2006)

Martin succeeded Chrétien as party leader and prime minister in 2003. Despite the personal rivalry between the two, Martin was Minister of Finance during the 1990s and was the architect of the Liberals' economic policies. Chrétien left office with a high approval rating and Martin was expected to make inroads into Quebec and Western Canada, two regions of Canada where the Liberals had not attracted much support since the 1980s and 1990s, respectively.

The political situation changed with the revelation of the sponsorship scandal, in which advertising agencies supporting the Liberal Party received grossly inflated commissions for their services. Having faced a divided conservative opposition for the past three elections, Liberals were seriously challenged by competition from the newly united Conservative Party led by Stephen Harper. The infighting between Martin and Chrétien's supporters also dogged the party. Nonetheless, by criticizing the Conservatives' social policies, the Liberals were able to draw progressive votes from the NDP, which made the difference in several close races. In the 2004 election, the Liberals retained enough support to continue as the government, though they were reduced to a minority.

In the midst of various court rulings in 2003 and 2004 that allowed for the legalization of same-sex marriage in seven provinces and one territory, the Martin government proposed a bill to legalize same-sex marriage across Canada. The House of Commons passed the Civil Marriage Act in late June 2005 in a late-night, last-minute vote before Parliament closed down, the Senate passed it in July 2005, and it received Royal Assent on July 20. This made Canada the fourth country in the world to allow same-sex marriages. In November 2005, the Martin government brokered a deal between first ministers and aboriginal leaders known as the Kelowna Accord, which sought to improve the education, skills training, housing and health care of aboriginal peoples by providing $5 billion in funding over five years.

Following the release of the first Gomery Report, the Liberals dropped in polls. Nonetheless, Martin turned down the NDP's conditions for continued support, as well as rejecting an opposition proposal which would schedule a February 2006 election in return for passing several pieces of legislation. The Liberals thus lost a confidence vote on November 28, and Martin advised Governor General Michaëlle Jean to dissolve Parliament and call an election for January 2006.

The Liberal campaign was dogged from start to finish by the sponsorship scandal, which was brought up by a Royal Canadian Mounted Police (RCMP) criminal investigation into the leak of the income trust announcement. Numerous gaffes, contrasting with a smoothly run Conservative campaign, put Liberals as many as ten points behind the Conservatives in opinion polling. They managed to recover some of their momentum by election night, but not enough to retain power. They won 103 seats, a net loss of 30 from when the writs were dropped, compared to 124 for the Conservatives. Martin resigned as Liberal leader on March 18.

==== Struggles in opposition ====
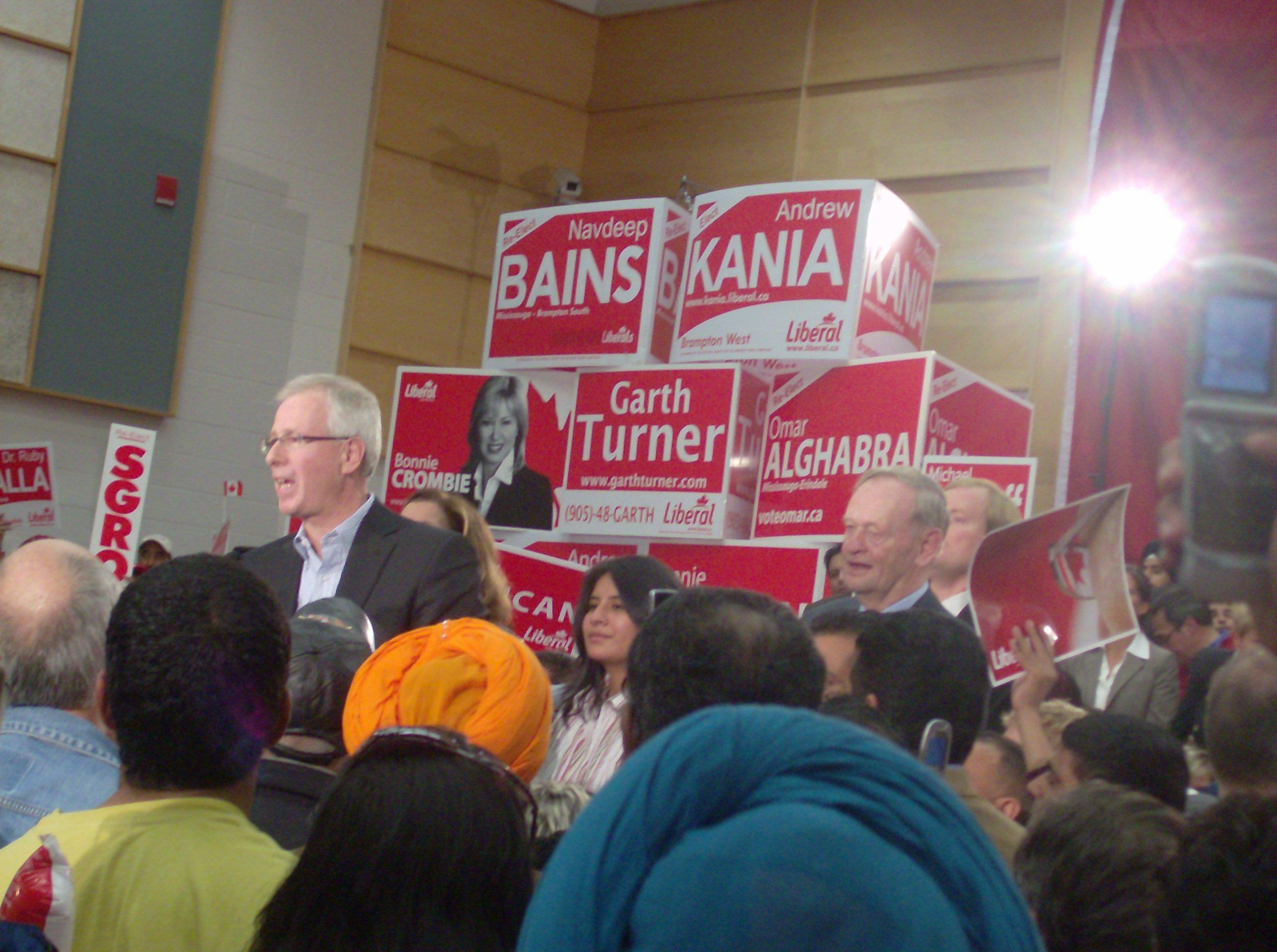
Stéphane Dion makes a speech on October 10, 2008, in Brampton West. Former Prime Minister Jean Chrétien was among notable Liberals at this rally; this was his first time campaigning for anyone since retirement.

The ensuing leadership election was set for December 2, 2006, in Montreal. Eight candidates entered the contest, but only Michael Ignatieff, Bob Rae, Stéphane Dion and Gerard Kennedy were considered to be the capable of garnering enough support to be able to win the leadership, with Ignatieff and Rae being considered the front-runners. Although Ignatieff lead on the first two ballots, on the third ballot Dion picked up enough support from the eliminated Kennedy to leapfrog both Rae and Ignatieff, eliminating Rae. On the fourth and final ballot, Dion defeated Ignatieff to become leader of the Liberal Party.

Dion campaigned on environmental sustainability during the leadership race, which later evolved into the "Green Shift": a proposal for a national carbon tax that would be offset by reductions to income tax rates. The plan was a key policy for the party in the 2008 federal election, but it was not well received and was continuously attacked by both the Conservatives and NDP. On election night, the Liberal Party won 26.26 per cent of the popular vote and 77 of the 308 seats in the House of Commons. At that time, their popular support was the lowest in the party's history, and weeks later Dion announced he would step down as Liberal leader once his successor was chosen.

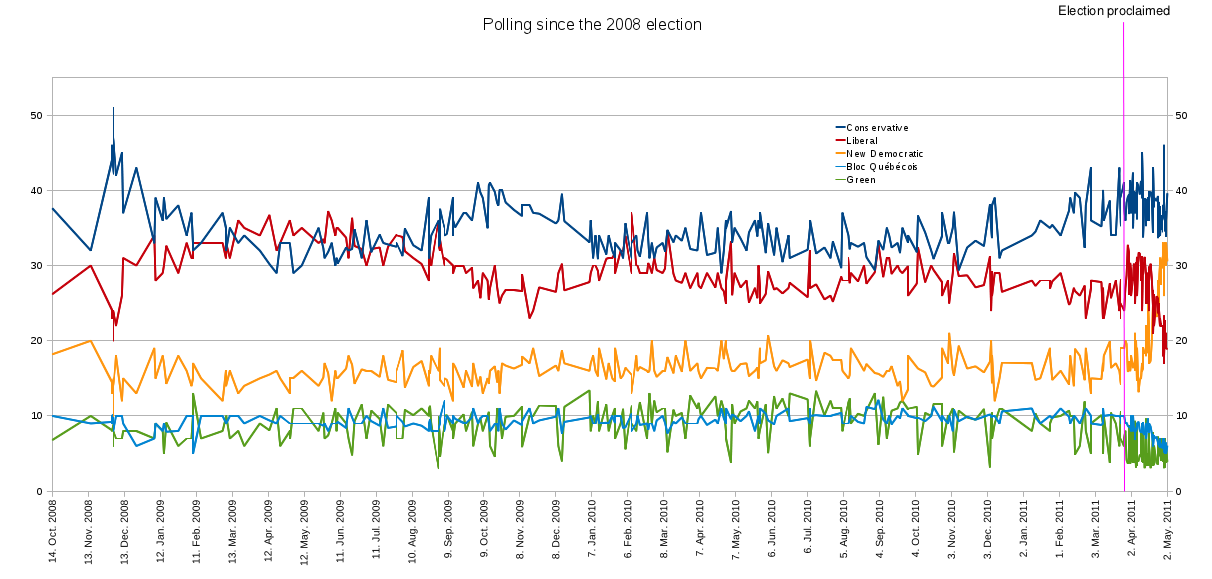
Graph of opinion polls conducted between the 2008 and 2011 elections

However, the 2008–2009 Canadian parliamentary dispute made Dion's continued leadership untenable: an agreement to form a coalition government with the NDP faced public opposition if it meant Dion was to be become prime minister, even if only until the leadership election. Dion thus resigned as leader on December 8, with caucus selecting Ignatieff as interim leader. However, Harper prorogued Parliament before a confidence vote could be scheduled. When parliament resumed on January 28, 2009, the Ignatieff Liberals agreed to support the budget as long as it included regular accountability reports, which the Conservatives accepted. This ended the possibility of the coalition government with the New Democrats. Ignatieff was formally named leader on May 2, 2009.

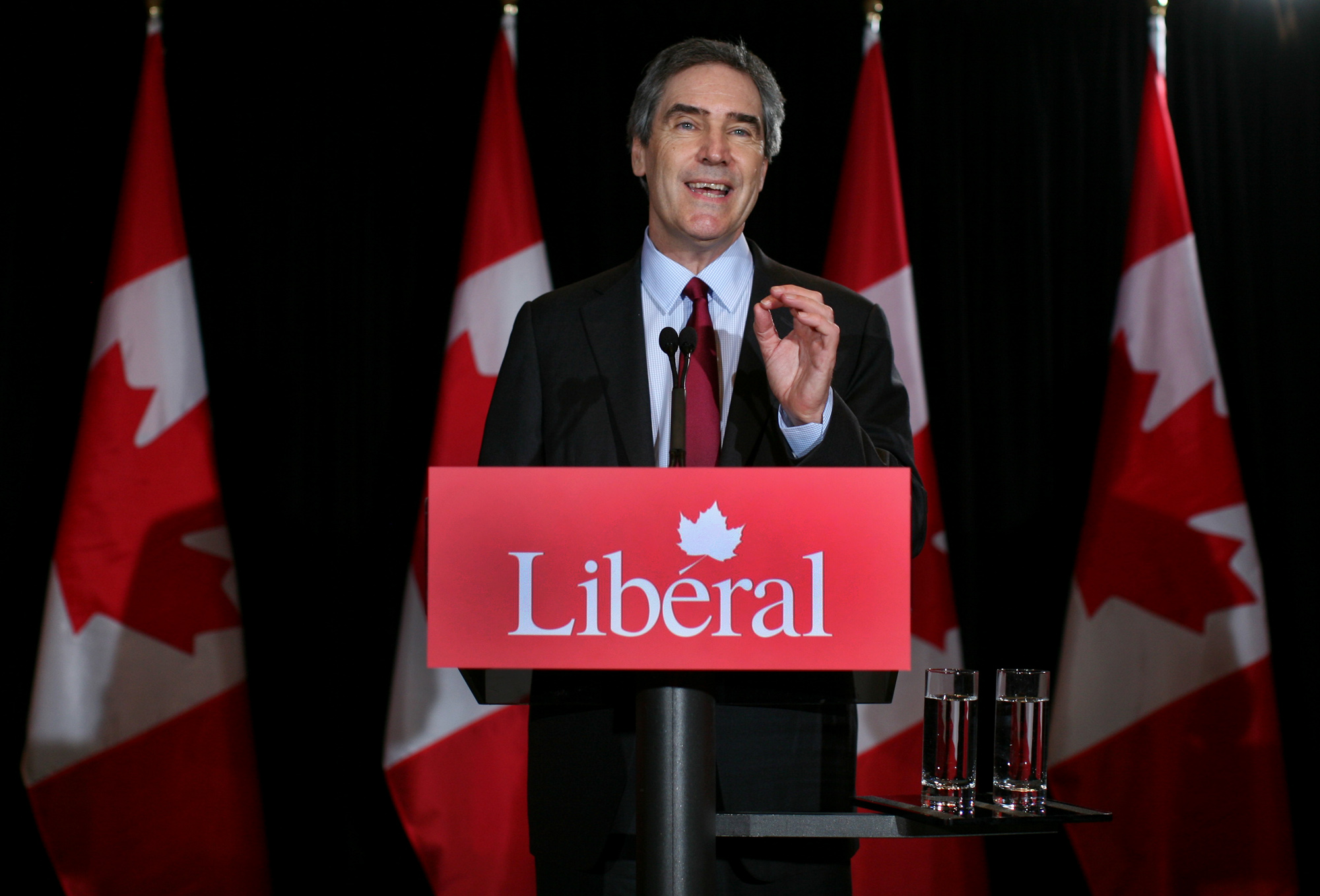
Michael Ignatieff speaks during a news conference in Toronto on March 28, 2011

By the time Ignatieff was confirmed as party leader, the Liberal Party had a comfortable lead over the governing Conservatives. Support fell over the summer as Ignatieff was characterized of "missing in action", and Ignatieff announced on August 31, 2009, that the Liberals would not support the minority Conservative government when Parliament resumed. A month later, on October 1, the Liberals put forth a non-confidence motion; however, the NDP abstained from voting and the Conservative government survived. The attempt to force an election, just a year after the previous one, was viewed as a miscalculation, as polls showed that most Canadians did not want another election. Afterwards, popularity for Ignatieff and his party continued to fall. Over the next year and a half, with the exception of a brief period in early 2010, support for the Liberals remained below 30 per cent, and behind the Conservatives.

The Liberal Party logo used from 2010 to 2014. In this and the subsequent logo, the stem of the maple leaf forms an acute accent, used in the word Libéral in French

Shortly after the Harper government was found to be in Contempt of Parliament over the Canadian Afghan detainee issue, Ignatieff successfully introduced a motion of no confidence against the government, beginning the 2011 election. The Liberals had considerable momentum when the writ was dropped, and Ignatieff successfully squeezed NDP leader Jack Layton out of media attention by issuing challenges to Harper for one-on-one debates. However, opponents frequently criticized Ignatieff's perceived political opportunism, particularly during the Leaders' debates when Layton criticized Ignatieff for having a poor attendance record for Commons votes: "You know, most Canadians, if they don't show up for work, they don't get a promotion." Ignatieff failed to defend himself against these charges, and the debates were said to be a turning point in the campaign.

On election day, the Liberals took the biggest loss in their history. The result was a third-place finish, with only 19 per cent of the vote and returning 34 seats in the House of Commons. Notably, their support in Toronto and Montreal, their power bases for the last two decades, all but vanished. The Conservatives won 40 per cent of the vote and formed a majority government, while the NDP won 31 per cent of the vote and formed the Official Opposition. It marked the first time the Liberals were unable to form either government or the official opposition. Ignatieff was defeated in his own riding and announced his resignation as Liberal leader shortly after. Bob Rae was chosen as the interim leader on May 25, 2011.

Pundits widely viewed the 2011 election as a political realignment and questioned the Liberal Party's viability.The Economist said, "the election represents the biggest realignment of Canadian politics since 1993"; Maclean's writer Andrew Coyne wrote that "the Conservatives are now in a position to replace the Liberals as the natural governing party in Canada." Books such as The Big Shift by John Ibbitson and Darrell Bricker, and Peter C. Newman's When the Gods Changed: The Death of Liberal Canada, asserted that the Liberals had become an "endangered species".

==== Justin Trudeau ====
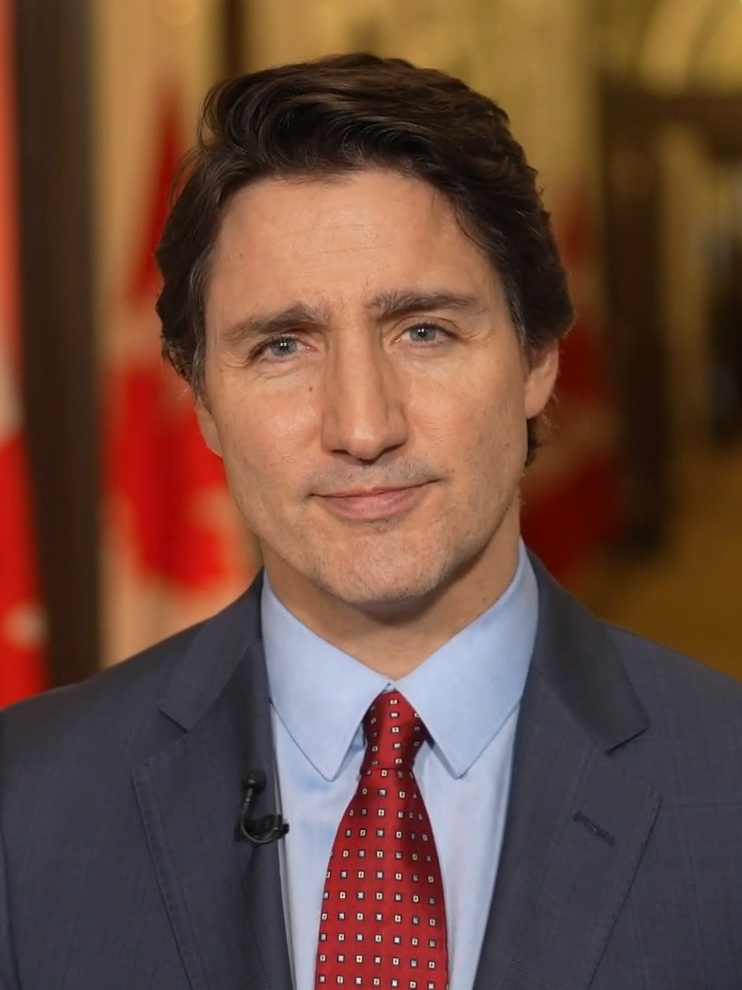
Justin Trudeau, the 23rd prime minister of Canada (2015–2025)

On April 14, 2013, Justin Trudeau, son of former prime minister Pierre Trudeau, was elected leader of the Liberal Party on the first ballot, winning 80% of the vote. Following his win, support for the Liberal Party increased considerably, and the party moved into first place in public opinion polls. In response, the Conservatives ran a series of ads attempting to "[paint] him as a silly dilettante unfit for public office" and the surge levelled off in the following year.

In 2014, Trudeau removed all Liberal senators from the Liberal Party caucus. In announcing this, Trudeau said the purpose of the unelected upper chamber is to act as a check on the power of the prime minister, but the party structure interferes with that purpose. Following this move, Liberal senators chose to keep the designation "Liberal" and sit together as a caucus, albeit not one supported by the Liberal Party of Canada. This independent group continued to refer to itself in publications as the Senate Liberal Caucus until 2019.

By the time the 2015 federal election was called, the Liberals had fallen back to third place. Trudeau and his advisors mounted a campaign based on economic stimulus in the hopes of regaining the mantle of being the party that best represented change from the New Democrats. The campaign was successful, and the Liberals won the election in a dramatic fashion: with 39.5 percent of the popular vote and 184 seats, it was the first time a party had won a parliamentary majority after placing third in a previous general election. Chantal Hébert deemed the result "a Liberal comeback that is headed straight for the history books", while Bloomberg's Josh Wingrove and Theophilos Argitis similarly described it as "capping the biggest political comeback in the country’s history." Spencer McKay, writing for the National Post, suggested that "maybe we've witnessed a revival of Canada's 'natural governing party'".

At the 2019 federal election, Trudeau's Liberal Party lost 20 seats in the House of Commons (lowering its total from 177 to 157) from the time of dissolution, they still won the most seats of any party—enough seats to allow Trudeau to form a minority government. For the first time since 1979, the party that garnered the largest share of the national popular vote did not win the most seats; the Liberals under Trudeau had 33.1 per cent of the popular vote, while the Conservatives under Andrew Scheer had 34.4 per cent. It was also the first time a government took power with less than 35 percent of the national popular vote since the Conservatives of John A. Macdonald, in 1867, who had 34.8 per cent of the votes.

In the 2021 federal election, Trudeau and the Liberals secured a third mandate and his second minority government after winning 160 seats. However, the Liberals again came in second in the national popular vote, behind the Conservatives. They received 32.6 percent of the popular vote, the lowest percentage of the national popular vote for a governing party in Canadian history.

In March 2022, Trudeau's Liberal Party agreed to a confidence and supply deal with the New Democratic Party. In September 2024, Jagmeet Singh announced that he was ending the confidence-and-supply agreement, with NDP sources saying they had "achieved all they could from the agreement." Throughout the year, the Liberals faced declining poll numbers and disappointing results in by-elections, including losses in safe seats such as Toronto—St. Paul's in Toronto and LaSalle—Émard—Verdun in Montreal, and battleground seats such as Cloverdale—Langley City in Vancouver. The months following these losses saw frequent media stories about internal frustration and discontent with Trudeau's leadership. This appeared to culminate in a caucus meeting where multiple members called on Trudeau to resign. Trudeau emerged from this meeting stating that the party remained "strong and united". On January 6, 2025, Trudeau prorogued parliament and announced his intent to resign as both party leader and prime minister following a leadership election.

==== Mark Carney ====
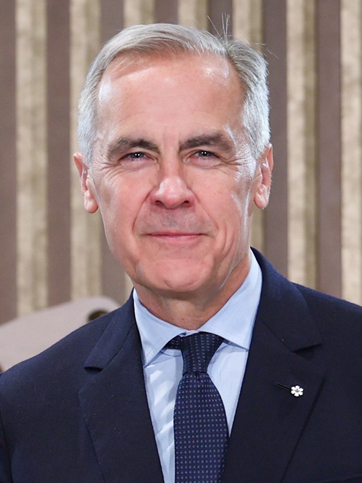
Mark Carney, the 24th and current prime minister of Canada (2025–present)

On March 9, 2025, Mark Carney was elected leader of the Liberal Party on the first ballot, winning 85.9% of the vote. In the 2025 Canadian federal election which was held on April 28, 2025, the Liberal Party under Carney's leadership which not only gain seats in the Canadian House of Commons, but would also win the popular vote for the first time since 2015, and over 40% of the popular vote for the first time since 2000. The Liberal Party would win 43.7% of the popular vote, the highest margin since 1980. After several floor-crossings and by-elections during the 45th Parliament, the Carney government achieved majority status in April 2026.

=== Systems and realignment model ===
Scholars and political experts have recently used a political realignment model to explain what was considered a collapse of a dominant party and put its condition in long-term perspective. According to recent scholarship, there have been four party systems in Canada at the federal level since Confederation, each with its own distinctive pattern of social support, patronage relationships, leadership styles, and electoral strategies. Steve Patten identifies four party systems in Canada's political history:

- The first party system emerged from pre-Confederation colonial politics, had its "heyday" from 1896 to 1911 and lasted until the Conscription Crisis of 1917, and was characterized by local patronage administered by the two largest parties, the Liberals and the Conservatives.
- The second system emerged following the First World War, and had its heyday from 1935 and 1957, was characterized by regionalism and saw the emergence of several protest parties, such as the Progressives, the Social Credit Party, and the Co-operative Commonwealth Federation.
- The third system emerged in 1963 and had its heyday from 1968 to 1983 and began to unravel thereafter. The two largest parties were challenged by a strong third party, the New Democratic Party (successor to the CCF). Campaigns during this era became more national in scope because of electronic media, and involved a greater focus on leadership. The dominant policy of the era was Keynesian economics.
- The fourth party system has involved the rise of the Reform Party, the Bloc Québécois, and the merger of the Canadian Alliance with the Progressive Conservatives. Most parties moved to one-member-one-vote leadership contests, and campaign finance laws were reformed in 2004. The fourth party system has been characterized by market-oriented policies that generally abandoned Keynesian policies but maintained the welfare state.

Stephen Clarkson (2005) shows how the Liberal Party has dominated all the party systems, using different approaches. It began with a "clientelistic approach" under Laurier, which evolved into a "brokerage" system of the 1920s, 1930s and 1940s under Mackenzie King. The 1950s saw the emergence of a "pan-Canadian system", which lasted until the 1990s. The 1993 election – categorized by Clarkson as an electoral "earthquake" which "fragmented" the party system, saw the emergence of regional politics within a four party-system, whereby various groups championed regional issues and concerns. Clarkson concludes that the inherent bias built into the first-past-the-post system, has chiefly benefited the Liberals.

== Principles and policies ==
The principles of the party are based on liberalism as defined by various liberal theorists and include individual freedom for present and future generations, responsibility, human dignity, a just society, political freedom, religious freedom, national unity, equality of opportunity, cultural diversity, bilingualism, and multilateralism. From the early twentieth century, the Liberal Party has favoured a variety of "big tent" policies from both right and left of the political spectrum. When it formed the government from 1993 to 2006, it championed balanced budgets, and eliminated the budget deficit completely from the federal budget in 1995 by reducing spending on social programs or delegating them to the provinces, and promised to replace the Goods and Services Tax in the party's famous Red Book. It also federally legalized same-sex marriage in 2005.

The Liberal Party has historically been the primary architect and champion of the country's official multiculturalism policy. Historically, Canadian immigration policy openly favored immigrants of Caucasian ancestry from the United States, Britain, and Europe. The Liberal government of the 1960s was responsible for dismantling this racially biased system. The shift to race-neutral immigration admissions criteria in Canada was a landmark policy change that began in 1962 and culminated with the introduction of the points-based immigration system in 1967 under the Liberal government. During Pierre Trudeau's time as Prime Minister (1968–1979, 1980–1984), Canada's immigration levels were much lower and more stable, with total arrivals often in the tens of thousands annually, contrasting sharply with current figures. The government introduced official immigration quotas in the mid-1970s, with a target of 100,000 in 1979. In 2017, the Liberal government announced Canada would welcome nearly one million immigrants over the next three years. A record 483,390 immigrants were admitted in 2024.

=== 2021 party platform ===
During the 2021 federal election, the Liberal Party of Canada introduced their platform, which included a "Gender and Diversity Impact Summary" for each chapter, as well as six key categories. These included: the pandemic, housing, health care, the economy, climate change, and reconciliation.

Key Liberal policies of the 2021 platform included:

- Requiring travellers on interprovincial trains, commercial flights, cruise ships, and other federally regulated vessels be vaccinated against COVID-19.
- An investment of $6 billion—on top of $4 billion already committed—to support the elimination of health system waitlists.
- Providing various investments in order to build, preserve, or revitalize 1.4 million new homes by 2025–26.
- Allocating funds to spend $2 billion over the next five years on measures to address the legacy of residential schools with "truth, justice, and healing" initiatives.
- Re-introducing legislation within the first 100 days in office to eliminate the practice of gay conversion therapy for everyone.
- Achieving net-zero emissions by 2050.
- Presenting a National Action Plan on Combating Hate by 2022 as part of a renewed Anti-Racism Strategy, including the Black Canadians Justice Strategy.
- Updating the committed number to receive 40,000 Afghan refugees.
- Creating a minimum tax rule so that everyone who earns enough to qualify for the top bracket pays at least 15% each year (the tax rate paid by people earning less than $49,000), removing their ability to artificially pay no tax through excessive use of deductions and credits.
- Establishing a permanent Council of Economic Advisors to provide independent advice to government on long-term growth. The council will be gender- balanced and reflect Canada's diversity.
- Reform economic immigration programs to expand pathways to permanent residence for temporary foreign workers and former international students through the Express Entry points system.
- Setting aside a minimum of $1 billion to support provinces or territories who implement a ban on handguns across their jurisdiction.

=== 2025 party platform ===
The Liberal Party's policies during the 2025 election included:

- Strengthening border security with new Canada Border Services Agency officers, drones, and K-9 teams to monitor shipments.
- Reinstating the zero-emissions vehicle subsidy program and introducing an adjustable carbon import tax to tax goods from countries that don't have comparable carbon pricing schemes. The party is favourable to new pipelines and energy projects but will allow Quebec to veto new pipelines on its territory.
- Cutting income taxes for the lowest tax bracket, cancelling a proposed increase in the capital gains inclusion rate, and eliminating the Goods and Services Tax on homes that cost less than $1 million for new buyers.
- Increasing the guaranteed income supplement and easing access to employment insurance.
- Recruiting new RCMP personnel, increasing funding for the Public Prosecution Service, and making it harder for people charged with violent crimes to get bail.
- Increasing defence spending to meet the NATO commitment of 2% of GDP by 2030.
- Expanding diplomatic activities to strengthen ties with foreign allies in pursuit of a "full foreign policy" and maintaining the annual foreign aid budget at $800 million.
- Cutting government spending by shrinking the public service and aiming to balance the government's operational spending within 3 years.
- Creating a new standalone entity called Build Canada Homes to oversee the construction of affordable housing, which would supply $25 billion in debt and $1 billion in equity financing to prefabricated home builders.
- Capping immigration, reducing the number of temporary workers and international students in Canada, tightening visa requirements, and increasing enforcement against immigration fraud. The Liberals aim to increase francophone immigration outside Quebec.
- Increasing public financing for Indigenous-led infrastructure projects and continuing to support Jordan's Principle.
- Fast-tracking large-scale, "national-interest" infrastructure projects.
- Aiming to remove interprovincial trade barriers by Canada Day and increasing funding for apprenticeship programs and union-led training programs.
- Negotiating a bilateral trade agreement with the United States and imposing tariffs to match those imposed by the US on Canada and to protect the Canadian auto industry.

== Provincial parties ==
Seven provinces and one territory in Canada have a "Liberal Party" in their legislatures. Neither Nunavut nor the Northwest Territories have party-based electoral and governing systems (both operate with consensus democracy). British Columbia had a Liberal Party whose name and ideology have shifted, BC United; Saskatchewan also had a Liberal Party whose name has changed, Saskatchewan Progress Party. Yukon, Alberta, Manitoba, Ontario and Quebec each have a Liberal Party that may align ideologically with the federal party but operates as a completely separate entity (though at one time were affiliated): Those provincial parties have separate policies, finances, memberships, constituency associations, executives, conventions and offices. The New Brunswick, Newfoundland and Labrador, Nova Scotia, and Prince Edward Island provincial Liberals are each semi-affiliated with the federal Liberal Party.

== Election results ==
The Liberal Party has been one of two principal contenders for power for most of Canada's history, most often with the Conservative Party (or its predecessor parties) as the primary rival. It is often referred to as Canada's "natural governing party" due to its electoral success and endurance. The Liberal Party has formed government after 26 of the 45 federal elections since the confederation of Canada in 1867, leading the national government for almost 60% of the nation's history. The party only failed to form either the government or the official opposition once, in the 2011 federal election.

=== House of Commons ===
Election	Leader	Votes	%	Seats	+/–	Position	Status
1867	George Brown	60,818	22.70	62 / 180	▲62	▲2nd	Opposition
1872	Edward Blake	110,556	34.70	95 / 200	▲33	2nd	Opposition
1874	Alexander Mackenzie	128,455	39.50	129 / 206	▲34	▲1st	Majority
1878	Alexander Mackenzie	180,074	33.10	63 / 206	▼66	▼2nd	Opposition
1882	Edward Blake	160,547	31.10	73 / 211	▲10	2nd	Opposition
1887	Edward Blake	312,736	43.10	80 / 215	▲7	2nd	Opposition
1891	Wilfrid Laurier	350,512	45.20	90 / 215	▲10	2nd	Opposition
1896	Wilfrid Laurier	401,425	41.40	117 / 213	▲27	▲1st	Majority
1900	Wilfrid Laurier	477,758	50.30	128 / 213	▲11	1st	Majority
1904	Wilfrid Laurier	521,041	50.90	137 / 214	▲9	1st	Majority
1908	Wilfrid Laurier	570,311	48.90	133 / 221	▼4	1st	Majority
1911	Wilfrid Laurier	596,871	45.82	85 / 221	▼48	▼2nd	Opposition
1917	Wilfrid Laurier	729,756	38.80	82 / 235	▼3	▼2nd	Opposition
1921	Mackenzie King	1,285,998	41.15	118 / 235	▲36	▲1st	Majority
1925	Mackenzie King	1,252,684	39.74	100 / 245	▼18	▼2nd	Minority
1925	Mackenzie King	1,252,684	39.74	100 / 245	▼18	▼2nd	Opposition
1926	Mackenzie King	1,397,031	42.90	116 / 245	▲16	▲1st	Minority
1930	Mackenzie King	1,716,798	45.50	89 / 245	▼27	▼2nd	Opposition
1935	Mackenzie King	1,967,839	44.68	173 / 245	▲84	▲1st	Majority
1940	Mackenzie King	2,365,979	51.32	179 / 245	▲6	1st	Majority
1945	Mackenzie King	2,086,545	39.78	118 / 245	▼61	1st	Minority
1945	Mackenzie King	2,086,545	39.78	118 / 245	▼61	1st	Majority (Note: Government gained majority status, after resignations and by-elections in the 20th Parliament.)
1949	Louis St. Laurent	2,874,813	49.15	191 / 262	▲73	1st	Majority
1953	Louis St. Laurent	2,731,633	48.43	169 / 265	▼22	1st	Majority
1957	Louis St. Laurent	2,702,573	40.50	105 / 265	▼64	▼2nd	Opposition
1958	Lester Pearson	2,432,953	33.40	48 / 265	▼57	2nd	Opposition
1962	Lester Pearson	2,846,589	36.97	99 / 265	▲51	2nd	Opposition
1963	Lester Pearson	3,276,996	41.48	128 / 265	▲29	▲1st	Minority
1965	Lester Pearson	3,099,521	40.18	131 / 265	▲3	1st	Minority
1968	Pierre Trudeau	3,686,801	45.37	154 / 264	▲23	1st	Majority
1972	Pierre Trudeau	3,717,804	38.42	109 / 264	▼45	1st	Minority
1974	Pierre Trudeau	4,102,853	43.15	141 / 264	▲32	1st	Majority
1979	Pierre Trudeau	4,595,319	40.11	114 / 282	▼27	▼2nd	Opposition
1980	Pierre Trudeau	4,855,425	44.34	147 / 282	▲33	▲1st	Majority
1984	John Turner	3,516,486	28.02	40 / 282	▼107	▼2nd	Opposition
1988	John Turner	4,205,072	31.92	83 / 295	▲43	2nd	Opposition
1993	Jean Chrétien	5,647,952	41.24	177 / 295	▲94	▲1st	Majority
1997	Jean Chrétien	4,994,277	38.46	155 / 301	▼22	1st	Majority
2000	Jean Chrétien	5,252,031	40.85	172 / 301	▲17	1st	Majority
2004	Paul Martin	4,982,220	36.73	135 / 308	▼37	1st	Minority
2006	Paul Martin	4,479,415	30.23	103 / 308	▼32	▼2nd	Opposition
2008	Stéphane Dion	3,633,185	26.26	77 / 308	▼26	2nd	Opposition
2011	Michael Ignatieff	2,783,175	18.91	34 / 308	▼43	▼3rd	Third party
2015	Justin Trudeau	6,928,055	39.47	184 / 338	▲150	▲1st	Majority
2019	Justin Trudeau	6,018,728	33.12	157 / 338	▼27	1st	Minority
2021	Justin Trudeau	5,556,629	32.62	160 / 338	▲3	1st	Minority (Note: The New Democratic Party provided confidence and supply for the Liberal Party government, from March 2022 to September 2024.)
2025	Mark Carney	8,595,506	43.76	169 / 343 (Note: The Supreme Court of Canada overturned the results in Terrebonne in February 2026, with the 2026 Terrebonne federal by-election being called.)	▲9	1st	Minority
2025	Mark Carney	8,595,506	43.76	169 / 343	▲9	1st	Majority (Note: Government gained majority status on April 13, 2026, after multiple floor-crossings in the 45th Parliament.)

== Party leadership ==
- George Brown (1867; unofficial)
- Edward Blake (1869–1870; unofficial)
- Alexander Mackenzie (1873–1880)
- Edward Blake (1880–1887)
- Wilfrid Laurier (1887–1919)
- Daniel Duncan McKenzie (1919; interim)
- William Lyon Mackenzie King (1919–1948)
- Louis St. Laurent (1948–1958)
- Lester B. Pearson (1958–1968)
- Pierre Trudeau (1968–1984)
- John Turner (1984–1990)
- Jean Chrétien (1990–2003)
- Paul Martin (2003–2006)
- Bill Graham (2006; interim)
- Stéphane Dion (2006–2008)
- Michael Ignatieff (2008–2011)
- Bob Rae (2011–2013; interim)
- Justin Trudeau (2013–2025)
- Mark Carney (since 2025)

== See also ==
- Liberal Party of Canada leadership elections
- Liberalism in Canada
- List of major liberal parties considered centre-left
- List of federal political parties in Canada
- Senate Liberal Caucus
- Trudeauism
