= Electoral history of John Turner =

Seventeenth prime minister of Canada

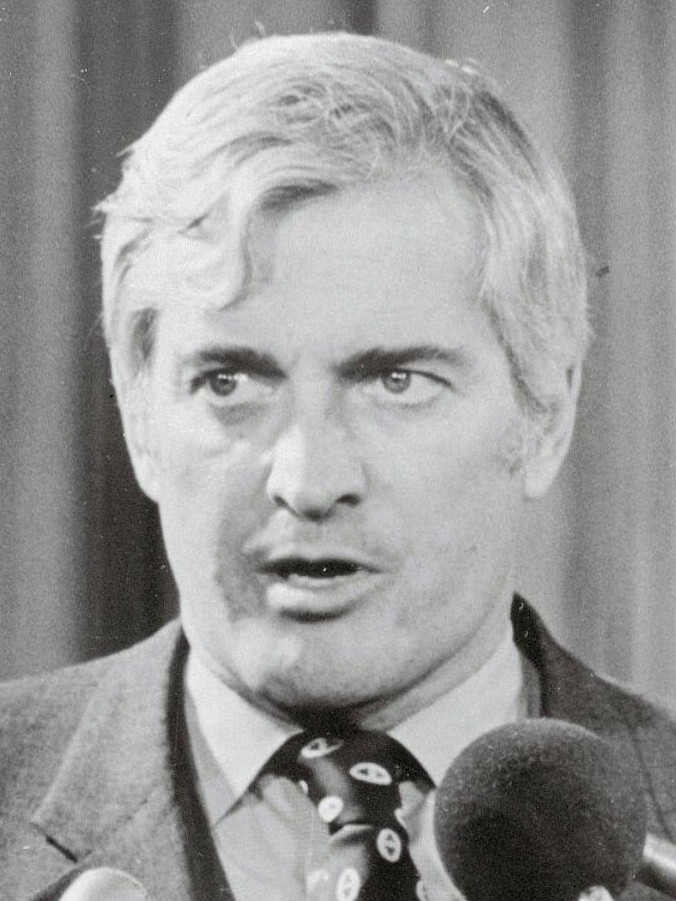
John Turner in 1975.

This article is the Electoral history of John Turner, the seventeenth Prime Minister of Canada.

A liberal, Turner served one term as prime minister (June 30 to September 17, 1984), as successor to Pierre Trudeau. He had the second shortest-tenure of office of all the prime ministers, with only Charles Tupper having a shorter term. Like Tupper, he never sat in Parliament while he was prime minister.

Turner led the Liberal Party of Canada in two general elections (1984) and (1988), and lost both to Brian Mulroney. He resigned the party leadership following the 1988 general election, and was succeeded by Jean Chrétien.

Turner stood for election to the House of Commons of Canada eight times and was elected each time.

Turner stood for election as leader of the Liberal Party twice. He lost in 1968 to Pierre Trudeau, but he won in 1984, becoming Trudeau's successor as Liberal leader. He beat Jean Chrétien in the 1984 convention, but was eventually succeeded by Chrétien after the 1988 election loss.

== Summary ==
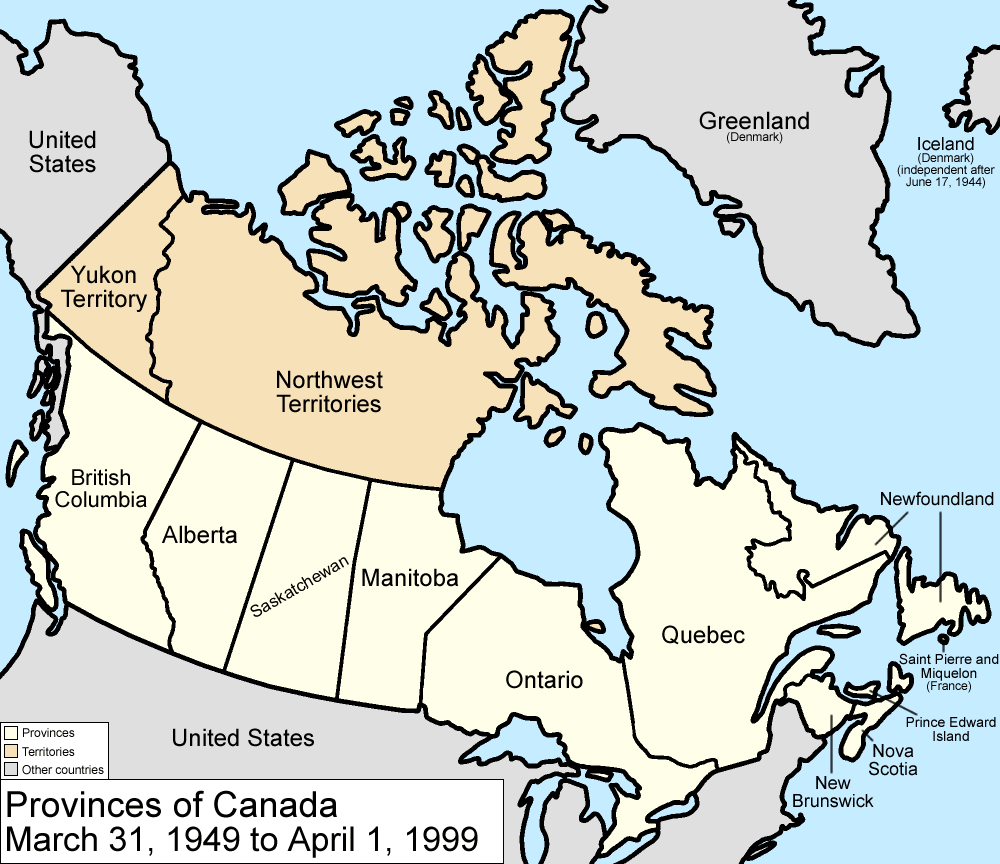
Canada had ten provinces and two territories throughout Turner's time as Prime Minister.

Turner ranks twenty-second out of twenty-three prime ministers for time in office, serving one term of 79 days. Only Charles Tupper had a shorter term, of 68 days in office. Like Tupper, Turner never sat in the House of Commons as prime minister.

Turner is the first of two prime ministers from British Columbia, the other being Kim Campbell.

A lawyer, Turner got involved in politics at an early age. He was first elected to the House of Commons at age 33, in the federal election of 1962. He was appointed to Cabinet by Prime Minister Lester Pearson (1965 to 1968) and then by Prime Minister Pierre Trudeau (1968 to 1975). He resigned from Cabinet in 1975 and returned to private practice of law.

Turner had contested the Liberal Party leadership in 1968 when Pearson retired, but was defeated by Trudeau, who became prime minister. When Trudeau announced his retirement in 1984, Turner again entered the leadership contest. This time he won, defeating Jean Chrétien.

Turner led the Liberals in two general elections (1984) and (1988). Following his election as party leader in 1984, Turner called a general election. The Liberals were defeated by Brian Mulroney, going from government to opposition. Brian Mulroney won the largest majority in the Commons (in number of seats) in Canadian history, and the Liberals won only ten more seats than the third party, the New Democratic Party. Turner became Leader of the Official Opposition. In 1988, he again led the Liberals. While they were again defeated by Mulroney, under Turner's leadership they more than doubled their seats in the Commons, outstripping the NDP to remain the dominant second party.

Turner never sat as prime minister in the House of Commons, because he was not a member of the Commons when he was elected leader of the Liberal Party. In the 1984 general election, he won a seat in the Commons, but Parliament was not recalled until after the change in government. Turner then sat in Commons as Leader of the Opposition. He is only the second prime minister who never sat in Parliament as prime minister, the other being Charles Tupper.

Turner stood for election to the Commons eight times: three times from Montreal (St. Lawrence—St. George), three times from Ottawa (Ottawa–Carleton), and twice from Vancouver (Vancouver Quadra). He was elected all eight times. He served a total of 22 years, 9 months, 17 days in the House of Commons.

After his second general election defeat, Turner resigned as leader of the Liberal Party in 1990, being succeeded by Chrétien. He continued to sit in the Commons until the 1993 election, when he retired from politics.

== Federal general elections: 1984 and 1988 ==
Turner led the Liberal Party in two general elections (1984) and (1988). He lost both times to Brian Mulroney.

=== Federal general election: 1984 ===
In his first election as leader, Turner led the Liberals to a major defeat, winning only forty seats in the Commons. Mulroney won the largest majority (in seat numbers) in Canadian history.

Canadian Federal Election, 1984 - Parties, Leaders, Seats Won and Popular Vote
Party	Leaders	Seats Won	Popular Vote
Progressive Conservative	Brian Mulroney^{1}	211	50.0%
Liberal	John Turner^{2}	40	28.0%
New Democratic Party	Ed Broadbent	30	18.8%
Non-affiliated	–	1	0.3%
Total		282	97.1%^{3}
Sources: Library of Parliament – History of Federal Ridings since 1867

^{1} Leader of the Opposition when election was called; Prime Minister after election.
^{2} Prime Minister when election was called; Leader of the Opposition after the election.
^{3} Table does not include parties which received votes but did not elect any members.

=== Federal general election: 1988 ===
In his second general election as leader, Turner doubled the Liberal Party standings in the House of Commons, but remained in Opposition.

Canadian Federal Election, 1988 - Parties, Leaders, Seats Won and Popular Vote
Party	Leaders	Seats Won	Popular Vote
Progressive Conservative	Brian Mulroney^{1}	169	43.0%
Liberal	John Turner^{2}	83	31.9%
New Democratic Party	Ed Broadbent	43	20.4%
Total		295	95.3%^{3}
Sources: Library of Parliament – History of Federal Ridings since 1867

^{1} Prime Minister when election was called; Prime Minister after election.
^{2} Leader of the Opposition when election was called; Leader of the Opposition after the election.
^{3} Table does not include parties which received votes but did not elect any members.

== Federal constituency elections: 1962 to 1974; 1984 and 1988 ==
Turner stood for election to the House of Commons eight times. He was elected each time.

=== 1962 Federal Election: St. Lawrence–St. George ===
Federal Election, 1962: St. Lawrence—St. George, Quebec
Party	Candidate	Popular Vote	%
Liberal	Yes John Turner	7,227	51.9%
Progressive Conservative	X Egan Chambers	4,969	35.7%
New Democratic Party	R. Barry Rutland	1,282	9.2%
Social Credit	Eugène Caraghiaur	437	3.1%
Total		13,915	99.9%^{1}
Source: Library of Parliament – History of Federal Ridings since 1867: St. Lawrence–St. George

Yes Elected.
X Incumbent.
^{1} Rounding error.

=== 1963 Federal Election: St. Lawrence–St. George ===
Federal Election, 1963: St. Lawrence—St. George, Quebec
Party	Candidate	Popular Vote	%
Liberal	Yes X John Turner	8,552	58.3%
Progressive Conservative	Egan Chambers	3,796	25.9%
New Democratic Party	R. Barry Rutland	1,606	11.0%
Social Credit	Charles Sucsany	708	4.8%
Total		14,662	100.0%
Source: Library of Parliament – History of Federal Ridings since 1867: St. Lawrence–St. George

Yes Elected.
X Incumbent.

=== 1965 Federal Election: St. Lawrence–St. George ===
Federal Election, 1965: St. Lawrence—St. George, Quebec
Party	Candidate	Popular Vote	%
Liberal	Yes X John Turner	6,920	60.1%
Progressive Conservative	Alfred Warkentin	2,648	23.0%
New Democratic Party	Frank Auf der Maur	1,676	14.6%
Ralliement Créditiste	Lucien Plante	274	2.4%
Total		11,518	100.1%^{1}
Source: Library of Parliament – History of Federal Ridings since 1867: St. Lawrence–St. George

Yes Elected.
X Incumbent.
^{1} Rounding error.

The constituency of St. Lawrence–St. George was abolished in the 1968 re-distribution.

=== 1968 Federal Election: Ottawa—Carleton, Ontario ===
Federal Election, 1968: Ottawa—Carleton, Ontario
Party	Candidate	Popular Vote	%
Liberal	Yes John Turner	28,987	66.2%
Progressive Conservative	Kenneth Binks	11,665	26.7%
New Democratic Party	Harold Wilson	3,115	7.1%
Total		43,767	100.0%
Source: Library of Parliament – History of Federal Ridings since 1867: Ottawa–Carleton

Yes Elected.

=== 1972 Federal Election: Ottawa—Carleton, Ontario ===
Federal Election, 1972: Ottawa—Carleton, Ontario
Party	Candidate	Popular Vote	%
Liberal	Yes X John Turner	31,316	47.4%
Progressive Conservative	Strome Galloway	22,641	34.3%
New Democratic Party	Doris Shackleton	11,225	17.0%
Social Credit	David Morse	839	1.3%
Total		66,021	100.0%
Source: Library of Parliament – History of Federal Ridings since 1867: Ottawa–Carleton

Yes Elected.
X Incumbent.

=== 1974 Federal Election: Ottawa—Carleton, Ontario ===
Federal Election, 1974: Ottawa—Carleton, Ontario
Party	Candidate	Popular Vote	%
Liberal	Yes X John Turner	38,463	53.4%
Progressive Conservative	Bill Neville	27,588	38.3%
New Democratic Party	Dave Hall	6,014	8.3%
Total		72,065	100.0%
Source: Library of Parliament – History of Federal Ridings since 1867: Ottawa–Carleton

Yes Elected.
X Incumbent.

=== 1984 Federal Election: Vancouver Quadra, British Columbia ===
Federal Election, 1984: Vancouver Quadra, British Columbia
Party	Candidate	Popular Vote	%
Liberal	Yes John Turner	21,794	43.9%
Progressive Conservative	X Bill Clarke	18,581	37.5%
New Democratic Party	Ray Cantillon	8,343	16.8%
Green	Jim Bohlen	389	0.8%
Rhinoceros	Ian McConkey	219	0.4%
Independent	Diane Jones	111	0.2%
Libertarian	Marco Den Ouden	87	0.2%
Non-affiliated	Bill Burgess	28	0.1%
Independent	David Michael Shebib	20	0.0%^{1}
Commonwealth of Canada	T. Gaetan Feuille D'arable Wall	20	0.0%^{1}
Independent	J. G. Joseph Jackman	12	0.0^{1}%
Total		49,604	99.9%^{2}
Source: Library of Parliament – History of Federal Ridings since 1867: Vancouver Quadra

Yes Elected.
X Incumbent.
^{1} Less than 0.1%.
^{2} Rounding error.

=== 1988 Federal Election: Vancouver Quadra, British Columbia ===
Federal Election, 1988: Vancouver Quadra, British Columbia
Party	Candidate	Popular Vote	%
Liberal	Yes X John N. Turner	24,021	44.0%
Progressive Conservative	Bill Clarke	16,664	30.5%
New Democratic Party	Gerry Scott	11,687	21.4%
Reform	J. R. Jack Ford	1,112	2.0%
Rhinoceros	John Turner	760	1.4%
Libertarian	Walter Boytinck	129	0.2%
Communist	Bert Ogden	75	0.1%
Independent	Albert A. Ritchie	74	0.1%
Non-affiliated	Blair T. Longley	52	0.1%
Confederation of Regions	Nora Galenzoski	35	0.1%
Commonwealth of Canada	G. J. Joseph Jackman	23	0.0%^{1}
Non-affiliated	Allen Soroka	22	0.0%^{1}
Total		54,654	99.9%^{2}
Source: Library of Parliament – History of Federal Ridings since 1867: Vancouver Quadra

Yes Elected.
X Incumbent.
^{1} Less than 0.1%.
^{2} Rounding error.

== Liberal Party Leadership Conventions: 1968 and 1984 ==
Turner contested the leadership of the Liberal Party twice. In 1968, he lost to Trudeau, but in the 1984 convention he won the leadership, becoming Trudeau's successor as Liberal leader and prime minister.

=== 1968 Leadership Convention ===
Turner entered the leadership contest as the youngest candidate. He eventually lost on the fourth ballot to Trudeau, coming in third place after Trudeau and Robert Winters, a former minister in Pearson's government.

Liberal Leadership Convention, April 6, 1968 Voting results by ballot
Candidate	First Ballot		Second Ballot		Third Ballot		Fourth Ballot	
Candidate	Votes cast	%	Votes cast	%	Votes cast	%	Votes cast	%
Pierre Trudeau	752	31.8%	964	40.8%	1051	44.6%	1,203	51.1%
Paul Hellyer	330	13.9%	465	19.7%	377; Withdrew after third ballot.	16.0%	–	–
Robert Winters	293	12.4%	473	20.0%	621	26.3%	954	40.6%
John Turner	277	11.7%	347	14.7%	279	11.8%	195	8.3%
Paul Martin Sr.	277; Withdrew after first ballot.	11.7%	–	–	–	–	–	–
Joe Greene	169	7.1%	104	4.4%	29; Eliminated after third ballot.	1.2%	–	–
Allan MacEachen	165	6.9%	11; Eliminated after second ballot.	0.5%	–	–	–	–
Eric Kierans	103; Withdrew after first ballot.	4.3%	–	–	–	–	–	–
Harold Lloyd Henderson	0 Eliminated after first ballot.	0.0%	–	–	–	–	–	–
Total	2,366	99.8%^{1}	2,364	100.1%^{1}	2,357	99.9%^{1}	2,352	100.0%
Source: CPAC - 1968 Liberal Convention

^{1} Rounding error.

=== 1984 Leadership Convention ===
Trudeau announced his retirement in February 1984. Turner entered the leadership election and won on the second ballot. His main opposition was Jean Chrétien, who came in second.

Liberal Party Leadership Convention, June 16, 1984 Voting results by ballot
Candidate	First Ballot		Second Ballot	
Candidate	Votes cast	%	Votes cast	%
John Turner	1,593	46.4%	1,862	54.4%
Jean Chrétien	1,067	31.1%	1,368	40.0%
Don Johnston	278	8.1%	192	5.6%
John Roberts	185; Withdrew after first ballot.	5.4%	–	–
Mark MacGuigan	135; Withdrew after first ballot.	3.9%	–	–
John Munro	93; Withdrew after first ballot.	2.7%	–	–
Eugene Whelan	84; Eliminated after first ballot.	2.4%	–	–
Total	3,435	100.0%	3,422	100.0%
Source: CPAC – 1984 Liberal Convention

== See also ==
- Electoral history of Pierre Trudeau – Turner's predecessor as leader of the Liberal Party and as prime minister.
- Electoral history of Brian Mulroney – Turner's successor as prime minister and principal opponent in two general elections.
- Electoral history of Jean Chrétien – Turner's successor as leader of the Liberal Party.
