= Electoral history of Brian Mulroney =

Elections featuring Prime Minister of Canada

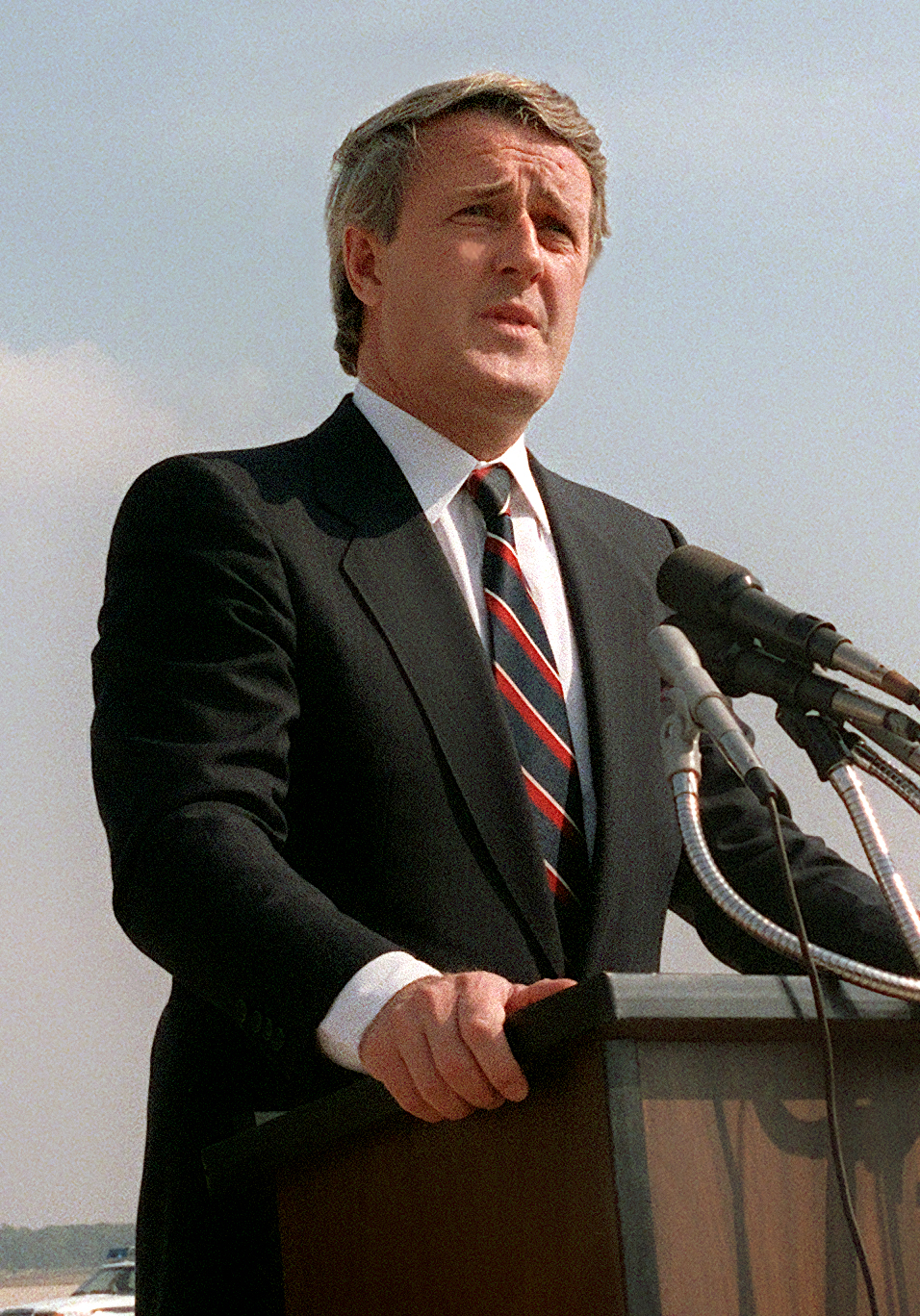
Brian Mulroney in 1984.

This article is the Electoral history of Brian Mulroney, the eighteenth Prime Minister of Canada. Mulroney served as prime minister from September 17, 1984 to June 25, 1993, having won two general elections.

A conservative, Mulroney served two terms as prime minister (1984 to 1993). Mulroney led the Progressive Conservative Party of Canada in two general elections, winning back to back majority governments (1984 and 1988). He was the first Conservative prime minister to do so since Prime Minister Sir John A. Macdonald, in 1887 and 1891.

Mulroney defeated Joe Clark for the leadership of the Progressive Conservatives in 1983, and then decisively defeated Prime Minister John Turner in the 1984 election. Mulroney's majority in the House of Commons was the largest in Canadian history, passing the record set by John Diefenbaker in 1958. He again led the Progressive Conservatives to the polls in the 1988 general election and was returned to power, but with a reduced majority.

Mulroney stood for election to the House of Commons of Canada three times, once in a by-election after he was elected party leader, and twice in general elections. He was elected each time, with substantial majorities.

Mulroney announced his retirement from politics in 1993 and was succeeded as prime minister and leader of the Progressive Conservative Party by Kim Campbell.

== Summary ==
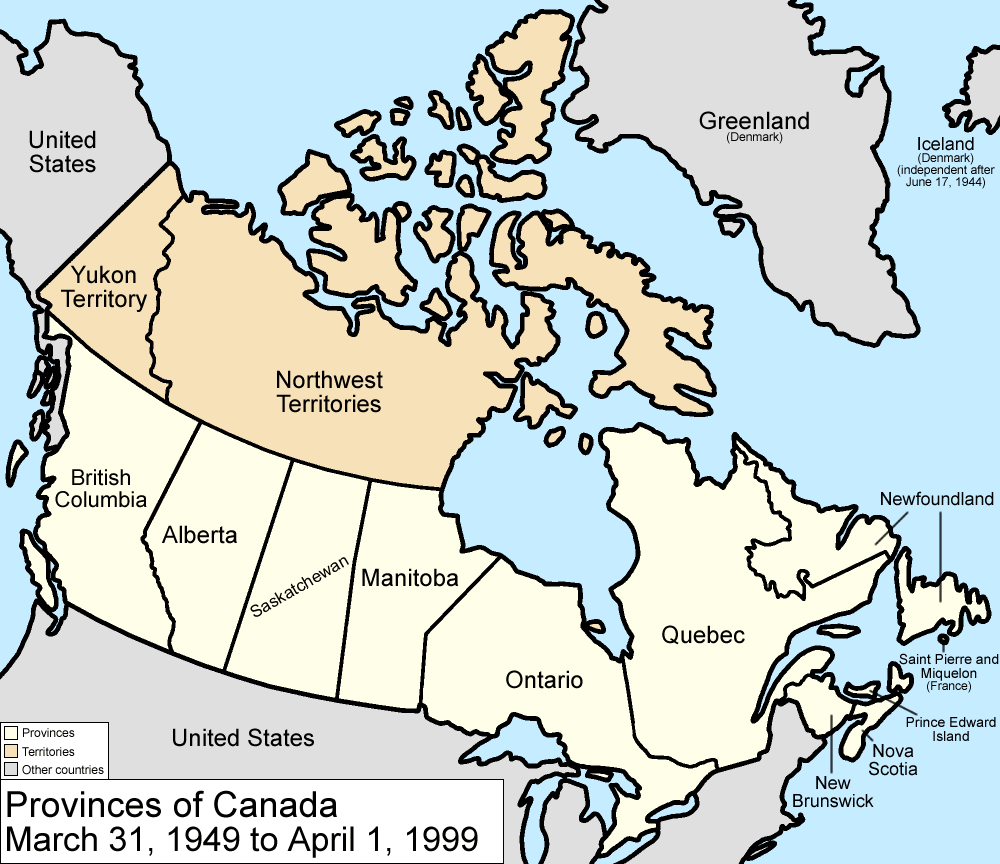
Canada had ten provinces and two territories throughout Mulroney's time as Prime Minister.

Mulroney ranks seventh out of twenty-three prime ministers for time in office, serving one term of eight years, 281 days.

He was the fifth of eight prime ministers from Quebec, the others being Sir John Abbott, Sir Wilfrid Laurier, Louis St. Laurent, Pierre Trudeau, Jean Chrétien, Paul Martin and Justin Trudeau.

Mulroney was involved in politics from a young age, being active in the Progressive Conservative party while in university. Although he did not run for office, he was well-established within the party. In 1976 he ran for the leadership, but came in third, behind Joe Clark and Claude Wagner. However, Clark was defeated in the 1980 general election and triggered a leadership convention in 1983. Mulroney again contested the leadership, and this time defeated Clark.

Entering the House of Commons by a by-election in 1983, Mulroney was the Leader of the Opposition until the general election of 1984. He led the Progressive Conservatives to a landslide, winning 211 of the 282 seats, the largest seat total in Canadian history. He again led the party in the 1988 general election and was returned to power, albeit with a reduced majority.

Mulroney stood for election to the House of Commons three times, once in a by-election and twice in general elections. He was elected each time, with substantial majorities. He served a total of 10 years, 1 month, 28 days in the Commons.

Early in 1993, Mulroney announced his retirement from politics. He returned to the private practice of law.

In the subsequent general election in 1993, the Progressive Conservatives were almost wiped out, going from a majority government to two seats in the Commons.

== Federal general elections: 1984 and 1988 ==
Mulroney led the Progressive Conservative Party in two general elections (1984) and (1988). He won both, defeating John Turner each time.

=== Federal general election: 1984 ===
In his first election as leader, Mulroney led the Progressive Conservatives to the largest majority (in seat numbers) in Canadian history.

Canadian Federal Election, 1984 - Parties, Leaders, Seats Won and Popular Vote
Party	Leaders	Seats Won	Popular Vote
Progressive Conservative	Brian Mulroney^{1}	211	50.0%
Liberal	John Turner^{2}	40	28.0%
New Democratic Party	Ed Broadbent	30	18.8%
Non-affiliated	–	1	0.3%
Total		282	97.1%^{3}
Sources: Library of Parliament – History of Federal Ridings since 1867

^{1} Leader of the Opposition when election was called; Prime Minister after election.
^{2} Prime Minister when election was called; Leader of the Opposition after the election.
^{3} Table does not include parties which received votes but did not elect any members.

=== Federal general election: 1988 ===
In his second general election as leader, Mulroney was returned to office, but with a reduced majority.

Canadian Federal Election, 1988 - Parties, Leaders, Seats Won and Popular Vote
Party	Leaders	Seats Won	Popular Vote
Progressive Conservative	Brian Mulroney^{1}	169	43.0%
Liberal	John Turner^{2}	83	31.9%
New Democratic Party	Ed Broadbent	43	20.4%
Total		295	95.3%^{3}
Sources: Library of Parliament – History of Federal Ridings since 1867

^{1} Prime Minister when election was called; Prime Minister after election.
^{2} Leader of the Opposition when election was called; Leader of the Opposition after the election.
^{3} Table does not include parties which received votes but did not elect any members.

== Federal constituency elections: 1983 to 1988 ==
Mulroney stood for election to the House of Commons three times. He was elected each time, with substantial majorities.

=== 1983 Federal By-Election: Central Nova ===
The incumbent, Elmer MacKay, resigned his seat on June 15, 1983, after Mulroney was elected party leader, to give Mulroney an opportunity to enter the House of Commons.

Federal By-election, August 29, 1983: Central Nova, Nova Scotia
Party	Candidate	Popular Vote	%
Progressive Conservative	Yes Brian Mulroney	18,882	60.2%
Liberal	Alvin Sinclair	7,858	25.0%
New Democratic Party	Roy G. Demarsh	4,202	13.4%
Independent	Anne C. McBride	287	0.9%
Independent	Bob Robert Kirk	97	0.3%
Independent	John C. Turmel	46	0.1%
Total		31,372	99.9%^{1}
Source: Library of Parliament – History of Federal Ridings since 1867: Central Nova

Yes Elected.
^{1} Rounding error.

=== 1984 Federal Election: Manicouagan ===
In the 1984 general election, Mulroney stood for election in the riding of Manicouagan in Quebec.

Federal election, 1984: Manicouagan, Quebec
Party	Candidate	Popular Vote	%
Progressive Conservative	Yes Brian Mulroney	28,208	71.6%
Liberal	X André Maltais	9,640	24.5%
New Democratic Party	Denis Faubert	939	2.4%
Parti nationaliste	Laurian Dupont	536	1.4%
Commonwealth of Canada	Raynald Rouleau	101	0.3%
Total		39,424	100.2%^{1}
Source: Library of Parliament – History of Federal Ridings since 1867: Manicouagan

Yes Elected.
X Incumbent.
^{1} Rounding error.

=== 1988 Federal Election: Charlevoix ===
In the 1988 general election, Mulroney stood for election in the Quebec riding of Charlevoix, which included his home town, Baie-Comeau.

Federal election, 1988: Charlevoix, Quebec
Party	Candidate	Popular Vote	%
Progressive Conservative	Yes Brian Mulroney	33,730	80.0%
Liberal	Martin Cauchon	5,994	14.2%
New Democratic Party	Kenneth Choquette	1,819	4.3%
Rhinoceros	François Yo Gourd	600	1.4%
Total		42,143	99.9%^{1}
Source: Library of Parliament – History of Federal Ridings since 1867: Charlevoix

Yes Elected.
^{1} Rounding error.

== Progressive Conservative Party Leadership Conventions: 1976 and 1983 ==
Mulroney ran in two Progressive Conservative leadership contests, in 1976 and 1983. He was defeated in the 1976 convention by Joe Clark, who became party leader. After Clark lost the 1980 general election, there was another leadership convention, in 1983. This time, Mulroney won and became party leader.

=== 1976 Leadership Convention ===
When Robert Stanfield announced his resignation as party leader in 1976, Mulroney was one of a crowded field of candidates in the leadership convention. Although he came in second on the first ballot, he ended in third place on the fourth ballot, behind Joe Clark, who won the leadership, and Claude Wagner, who came in second.

Progressive Conservative Leadership Convention, February 22, 1976 Voting results by ballot
Candidate	First Ballot		Second Ballot		Third Ballot		Fourth Ballot	
Candidate	Votes cast	%	Votes cast	%	Votes cast	%	Votes cast	%
Claude Wagner	531	22.5%	667	28.5%	1,003	42.8%	1,122	48.6%
Brian Mulroney	357	15.1%	419	17.9%	369; Eliminated after third ballot.	15.8%	–	–
Joe Clark	277	11.7%	532	22.8%	969	41.4%	1,187	51.4%
Jack Horner	235	10.0%	286; Withdrew after second ballot.	12.2%	–	–	–	–
Paul Hellyer	231	9.8%	118; Withdrew after second ballot.	5.0%	–	–	–	–
Flora Macdonald	214	9.1%	239; Withdrew after second ballot.	10.2%	–	–	–	–
Sinclair Stevens	182; Withdrew after first ballot.	7.7%	–	–	–	–	–	–
John Allen Fraser	127	5.4%	34; Eliminated after second ballot.	1.5%	–	–	–	–
James Gillies	87; Withdrew after first ballot.	3.7%	–	–	–	–	–	–
Pat Nowlan	86	3.6%	42; Withdrew after second ballot.	1.8%	–	–	–	–
Heward Grafftey	33; Eliminated after first ballot.	1.4%	–	–	–	–	–	–
Total	2,360	100.0%	2,337	99.9%^{1}	2,341	100.0%	2,309	100.0%
Source: CPAC – 1976 Progressive Conservative Leadership Convention

^{1} Rounding error.

=== 1983 Leadership Convention ===
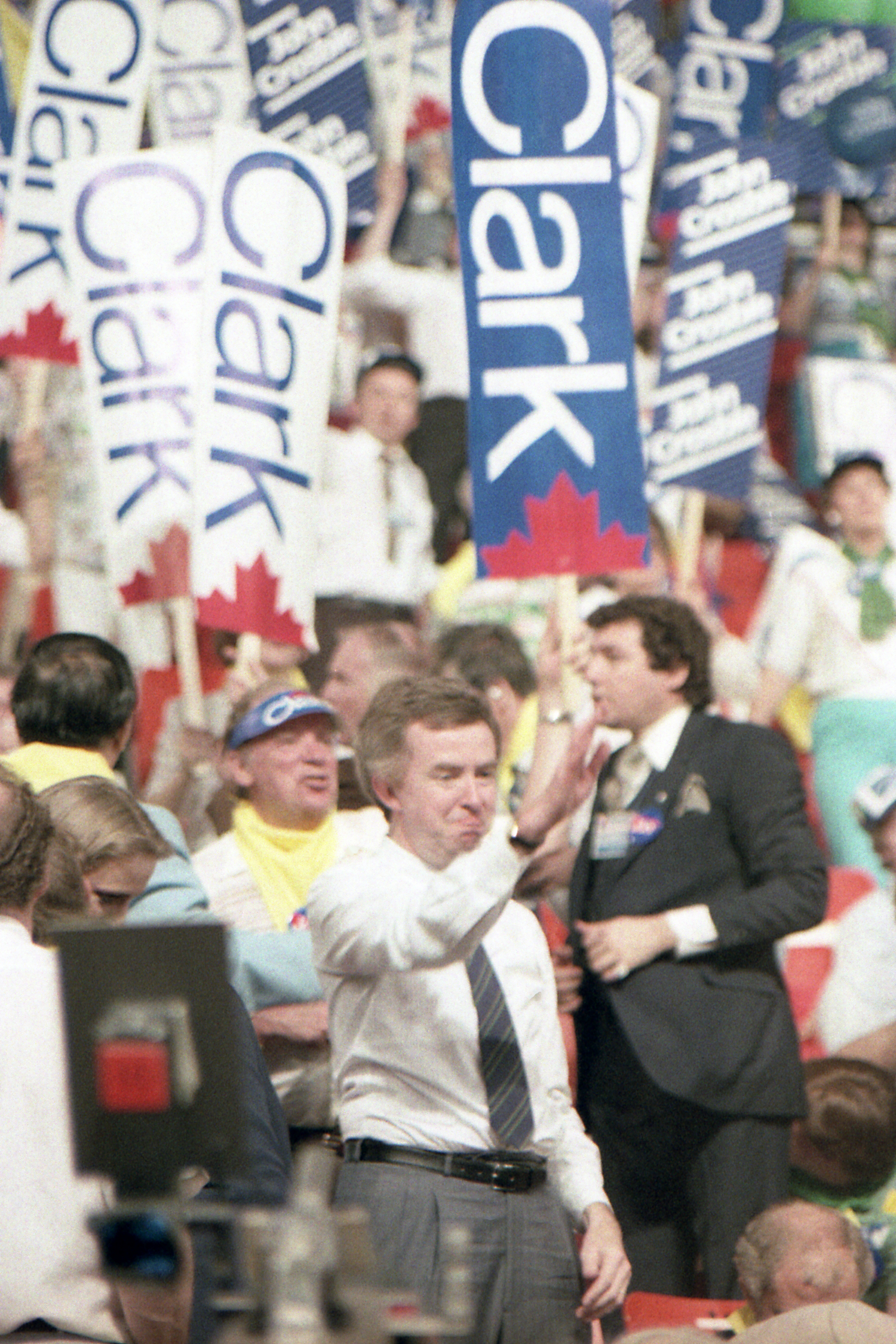
Clark at the 1983 leadership convention.

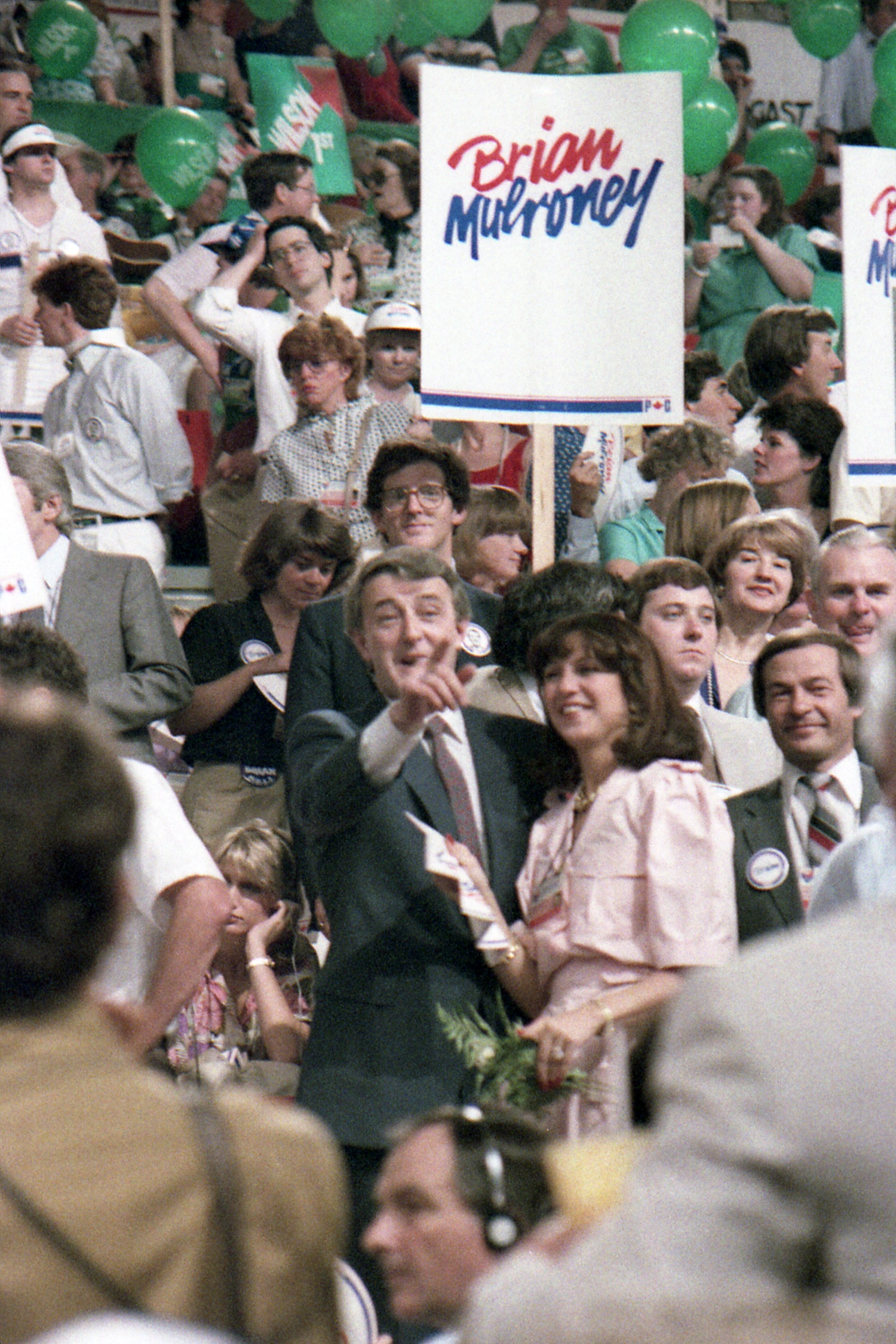
Mulroney at the 1983 leadership convention (photo by Alasdair Roberts).

Following a leadership review at the 1983 Progressive Conservative convention, Clark triggered a leadership convention, in which he stood for re-election. Mulroney again entered the leadership race. This time, he defeated Clark and succeeded him as party leader.

Progressive Conservative Leadership Convention, June 11, 1983 Voting results by ballot
Candidate	First Ballot		Second Ballot		Third Ballot		Fourth Ballot	
Candidate	Votes cast	%	Votes cast	%	Votes cast	%	Votes cast	%
Joe Clark	1,091	36.5%	1,085	36.7%	1,058	35.8%	1,325	45.6%
Brian Mulroney	874	29.3%	1,021	34.6%	1,036	35.1%	1,584	54.4%
John Crosbie	639	21.4%	781	26.4%	858; Eliminated after third ballot.	29.1%	–	–
Michael Wilson	144; Withdrew after first ballot.	4.8%	–	–	–	–	–	–
David Crombie	116	3.9%	67; Eliminated after second ballot.	2.3%	–	–	–	–
Peter Pocklington	102; Withdrew after first ballot.	3.4%	–	–	–	–	–	–
John A. Gamble	17; Withdrew after first ballot.	0.6%	–	–	–	–	–	–
Neil Fraser	5 Eliminated after first ballot.	0.2%	–	–	–	–	–	–
Total	2,988	100.1%^{1}	2,954	100.0	2,952	100.0%	2,910	100.0%
Source: CPAC – 1983 Progressive Conservative Leadership Convention

^{1} Rounding error.

== See also ==
- Electoral history of John Turner – Mulroney's predecessor as prime minister and principal opponent in two general elections.
- Electoral history of Joe Clark – Mulroney's predecessor as leader of the Progressive Conservative Party.
- Electoral history of Kim Campbell – Mulroney's successor as leader of the Progressive Conservative Party and as prime minister.
