= Party for the Commonwealth of Canada candidates in the 1993 Canadian federal election =

The Party for the Commonwealth of Canada fielded several candidates in the 1993 federal election, none of whom were elected. Information about these candidates may be found here. The PCC was the political wing of Lyndon LaRouche's movement in Canada.

== List of Candidates (incomplete) ==
=== Quebec ===
Riding	Candidate's Name	Notes	Gender	Residence	Occupation	Votes	%	Rank
Lachine—Lac-Saint-Louis	Claude Brosseau	Brosseau had previously contested Terrebonne in the 1984 election and Verdun—Saint-Paul in the 1988 election.	M		Representative	169	0.29	8th
Richelieu	Paulo da Silva		M		Manager	157	0.33	5th

=== Ontario ===
==== St. Paul's: Mike Twose ====
Twose described himself as an electrician. He campaigned against Canada's involvement in the North American Free Trade Agreement, the General Agreement on Tariffs and Trade and related agreements (Toronto Star, 22 October 1993). He received 11 votes (0.02%), finishing twelfth against Liberal Barry Campbell.

In 2002, Twose wrote against the existing system of peer review for scientific grants and publications (Toronto Star, 2 October 2002).

=== British Columbia ===
==== Vancouver Centre: Lucylle Boikoff ====
Boikoff's first name is sometimes spelled as "Lucille". She campaigned for public office several times, and was described as a 64-year-old retired teacher in 1990. She accused the International Monetary Fund of complicity with genocide in 1985.

Electoral record
Election	Division	Party	Votes	%	Place	Winner
1975 Ontario provincial	St. Catharines	North American Labour	192		5/5	Robert Johnston, Progressive Conservative
1977 Ontario provincial	Hamilton West	Ind. (North American Labour)	144		4/4	Stuart Smith, Liberal
1984 federal	Oshawa	Commonwealth	74		5/6	Ed Broadbent, New Democratic Party
1985 Ontario provincial	York South	Independent	402	1.33	5/6	Bob Rae, New Democratic Party
1988 federal	Oshawa	Commonwealth	139		5/5	Ed Broadbent, New Democratic Party
1990 Ontario provincial	Yorkview	Independent	231		5/5	George Mammoliti, New Democratic Party
1993 federal	Vancouver Centre	Commonwealth	27		12/13	Hedy Fry, Liberal
