= Electoral history of Joe Clark =

List of elections featuring Joe Clark as a candidate

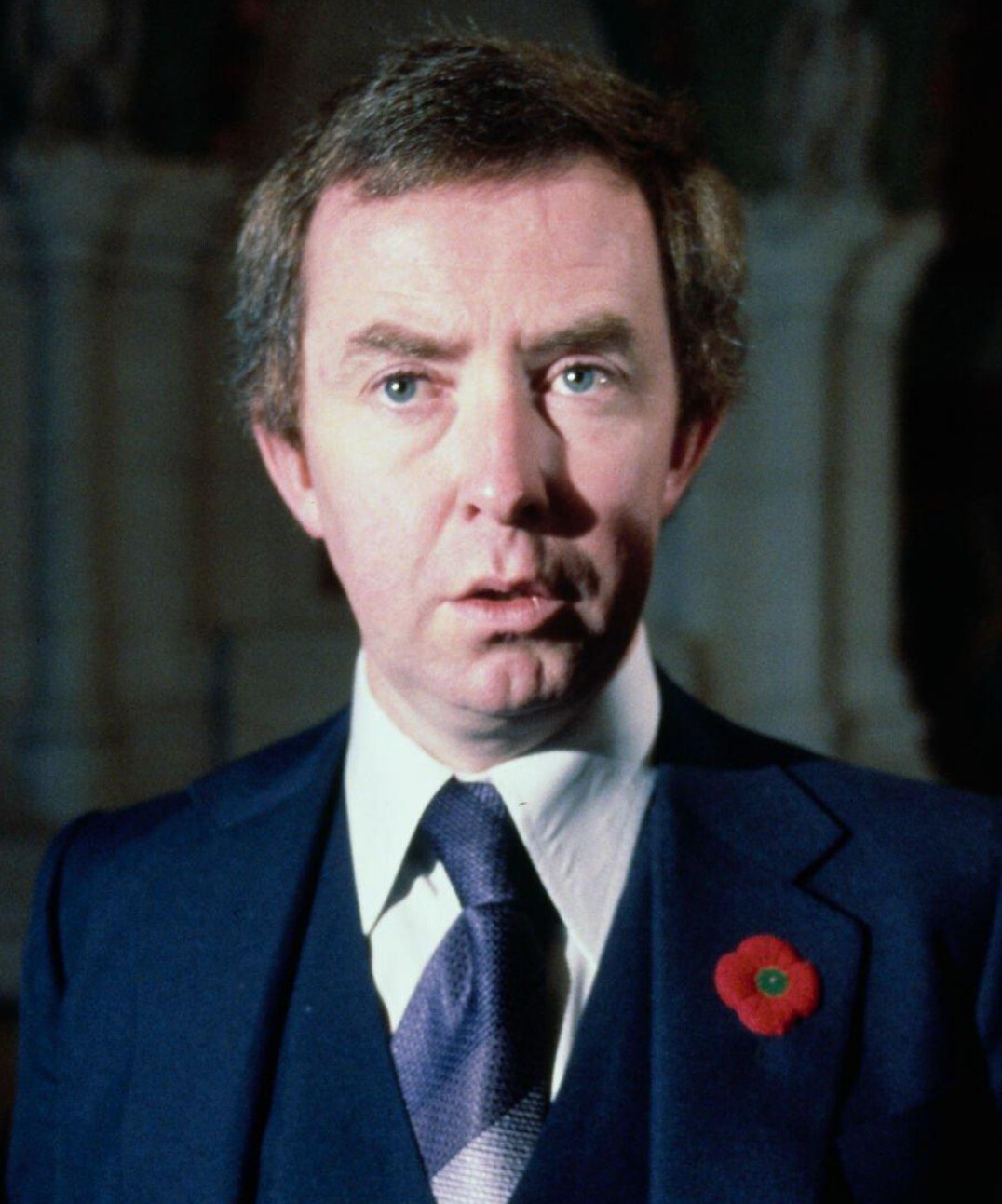
Joe Clark in 1979.

This article is the Electoral history of Joe Clark, the sixteenth Prime Minister of Canada.

A conservative, he served one term as prime minister (1979–1980). He led the Progressive Conservative Party of Canada in three general elections, winning one (1979) and losing two (1980 and 2000).

Clark defeated Pierre Trudeau in the 1979 election, but did not win a majority in the House of Commons of Canada. He formed a minority government, but it proved to be short-lived. The Clark government fell on a budget vote in December, 1979, triggering the 1980 election. Trudeau won that election and returned to office with a majority government. Clark became the Leader of the Opposition, but in 1983 he lost a leadership challenge to Brian Mulroney, who took over as leader of the Progressive Conservatives.

Clark again became leader of the party in 1998, and led the Progressive Conservatives in the 2000 election. The party lost seats in the House of Commons, remaining in fifth place. Clark led the party in the House for three years, until he announced his resignation in 2002. Peter Mackay succeeded him as leader of the Progressive Conservatives in 2003.

Clark stood for election to the House of Commons of Canada eight times. He was elected each time, often by substantial majorities. He also stood once for election to the Alberta Legislative Assembly but was not elected.

== Summary ==
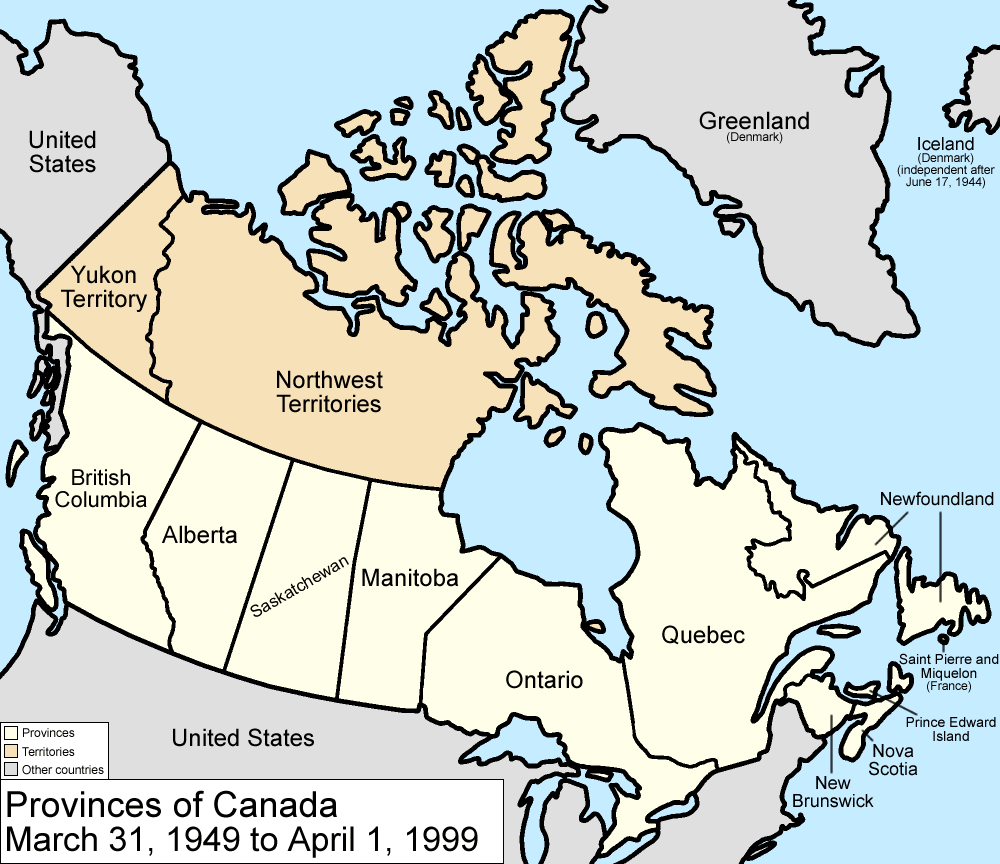
Canada had ten provinces and two territories throughout Clark's time as prime minister.

Clark ranks twentieth out of twenty-three prime ministers for time in office, serving one term of 273 days.

He was the second of three prime ministers from Alberta, the others being R. B. Bennett and Stephen Harper.

Clark was active in the Progressive Conservative Party from a young age. In 1976, he entered the leadership convention called to replace the outgoing leader, Robert Stanfield. Clark won the leadership against a crowded field, including Brian Mulroney.

In the 1979 election, Clark defeated Prime Minister Trudeau and the Liberals, but did not win a majority in the House of Commons. He formed a minority government but it proved to be short-lived. The Liberals and the New Democratic Party voted together to defeat the proposed budget in December, 1979, with the Social Credit members abstaining. The defeat on a budget measure triggered an immediate election, which Trudeau won, returning to power with a majority government.

Clark returned to the position as Leader of the Official Opposition, but also faced criticism from within his own party. In 1983, there was a leadership review at the Progressive Conservative party convention. Although Clark won an approval of 66.9%, he determined that he needed a stronger mandate from the party. He resigned as leader, while announcing that he would again run for the leadership and seek the party's approval. At the leadership convention held in the summer of 1983, Clark was defeated by Mulroney.

Although defeated for the leadership, Clark continued to sit in the Commons. When Mulroney led the Progressive Conservatives to a majority government in the general election of 1984, he appointed Clark to his Cabinet, first as Minister of External Affairs (1984–1991), and then as President of the Privy Council (1991–1993), with responsibility for constitutional affairs. Clark announced his retirement before the 1993 general election, when the Progressive Conservatives were reduced from a majority government to only two seats in the Commons.

In 1998, Clark was again elected as leader of the Progressive Conservative Party, which had never recovered from the 1993 defeat. He led the party in the 2000 election. The party lost seats in the House of Commons, remaining in fifth place. He led the party in the Commons until announcing his second retirement, in 2003.

Clark stood for election to the House of Commons for four different ridings. Three were in Alberta and one was in Nova Scotia, in a by-election after he was elected party leader in 2000. He was elected each time, often by substantial majorities. He served a total of 24 years, 9 months, and 11 days in the House of Commons.

Prior to his first election to the House of Commons, Clark stood for election to the Legislative Assembly of Alberta in 1967, but was defeated.

== Federal general elections: 1979, 1980, and 2000 ==
Clark led the Progressive Conservatives in three general elections. He won a minority government in the general election of 1979, but was defeated in the 1980 election. In the 2000 election, the Progressive Conservatives remained in fifth place in the Commons after the election.

=== Federal general election: 1979 ===
In his first election as leader, Clark led the Progressive Conservatives to a minority government, defeating Pierre Trudeau and the Liberals.

Canadian Federal Election, 1979 - Parties, Leaders, Seats Won and Popular Vote
Party	Leaders	Seats Won	Popular Vote
Progressive Conservative	Joe Clark^{1}	136	35.9%
Liberal	Pierre Trudeau^{2}	114	40.1%
New Democratic Party	Ed Broadbent	26	17.9%
Social Credit	Fabien Roy	6	4.6%
Total		282	98.5%^{3}
Sources: Library of Parliament – History of Federal Ridings since 1867

^{1} Leader of the Opposition when election was called; Prime Minister after election.
^{2} Prime Minister when election was called; Leader of the Opposition after the election.
^{3} Table does not include parties which received votes but did not elect any members.

=== Federal general election: 1980 ===
Clark's government fell on a budget vote in December, 1979, triggering the general election of 1980. Trudeau led the Liberals in the resulting election and was returned to power with a majority. Clark became the Leader of the Opposition.

Canadian Federal Election, 1980 - Parties, Leaders, Seats Won and Popular Vote
Party	Leaders	Seats Won	Popular Vote
Liberal	Pierre Trudeau^{1}	147	44.3%
Progressive Conservative	Joe Clark^{2}	103	32.5%
New Democratic Party	Ed Broadbent	32	19.8%
Total		282	96.6%^{3}
Sources: Library of Parliament – History of Federal Ridings since 1867

^{1} Leader of the Opposition when election was called; Prime Minister after election.
^{2} Prime Minister when election was called; Leader of the Opposition after the election.
^{3} Table does not include parties which received votes but did not elect any members.

=== Federal general election: 2000 ===
Clark became leader of the Progressive Conservatives for a second time in 1998 and led them in the general election of 2000. The party lost seats and remained in fifth place in the Commons.

Canadian Federal Election, 2000 - Parties, Leaders, Seats Won and Popular Vote
Party	Leaders	Seats Won	Popular Vote
Liberal	Jean Chrétien^{1}	172	40.9%
Alliance	Stockwell Day^{2}	66	25.5%
Bloc Québécois	Gilles Duceppe	38	10.7%
New Democratic Party	Alexa McDonough	13	8.5%
Progressive Conservative	Joe Clark	12	12.2%
Total		301	97.8%^{3}
Sources: Library of Parliament – History of Federal Ridings since 1867

^{1} Prime Minister when election was called; Prime Minister after election.
^{2} Leader of the Opposition when election was called; Leader of the Opposition after the election.
^{3} Table does not include parties which received votes but did not elect any members.

== Federal constituency elections, 1972 to 1988; 2000 ==
Clark stood for election to the House of Commons eight times, starting with the general election of 1972. He was elected all eight times, from three different ridings in Alberta and one Nova Scotia riding.

=== 1972 Federal Election: Rocky Mountain ===
Federal Election, 1972: Rocky Mountain, Alberta
Party	Candidate	Popular Vote	%
Progressive Conservative	Yes Joe Clark	12,984	51.6%
Liberal	X Allen B. Sulatycky	7,973	31.7%
New Democratic Party	Al Cheney	3,112	12.4%
Social Credit	Brian Ganske	1,080	4.3%
Total		25,149	100.0%
Source: Library of Parliament – History of Federal Ridings since 1867: Rocky Mountain

Yes Elected.
X Incumbent.

=== 1974 Federal Election: Rocky Mountain ===
Federal Election, 1974: Rocky Mountain, Alberta
Party	Candidate	Popular Vote	%
Progressive Conservative	Yes X Joe Clark	16,042	61.1%
Liberal	Arthur Yates	6,236	23.7%
New Democratic Party	Bob Wrigley	2,750	10.5%
Social Credit	C. J. Speirs	1,230	4.7%
Total		26,258	100.0%
Source: Library of Parliament – History of Federal Ridings since 1867: Rocky Mountain

Yes Elected.
X Incumbent.

=== 1979 Federal Election: Yellowhead ===
Federal Election, 1979: Yellowhead, Alberta
Party	Candidate	Popular Vote	%
Progressive Conservative	Yes X Joe Clark	28,849	70.0%
Liberal	Laurie Switzer	7,083	17.2%
New Democratic Party	Bob Ritchie	3,600	8.7%
Non-affiliated	Lex Miller	1,535	3.7%
Independent	Ronnie B. Plaunt	143	0.3%
Total		41,210	99.9%^{1}
Source: Library of Parliament – History of Federal Ridings since 1867: Yellowhead

Yes Elected.
X Incumbent.
^{1} Rounding error.

=== 1980 Federal Election: Yellowhead ===
Federal Election, 1980: Yellowhead, Alberta
Party	Candidate	Popular Vote	%
Progressive Conservative	Yes X Joe Clark	27,953	69.5%
Liberal	Laurie Switzer	7,302	18.1%
New Democratic Party	Laird Mitchell	4,562	11.3%
Independent	Robert L. T. Brower	249	0.6%
Independent	Brian K. Fallis	170	0.4%
Total		40,236	99.9%^{1}
Source: Library of Parliament – History of Federal Ridings since 1867: Yellowhead

Yes Elected.
X Incumbent.
^{1} Rounding error.

=== 1984 Federal Election: Yellowhead ===
Federal Election, 1984: Yellowhead, Alberta
Party	Candidate	Popular Vote	%
Progressive Conservative	Yes X Joe Clark	37,462	74.0%
New Democratic Party	Rick Hardy	6,906	13.6%
Liberal	Louis H. Joy	4,097	8.1%
Confederation of Regions	G. R. Snow	829	1.6%
Rhinoceros	Douglas Alan Bush	773	1.5%
Social Credit	Audrey Sweigard	553	1.1%
Total		50,620	99.9%^{1}
Source: Library of Parliament – History of Federal Ridings since 1867: Yellowhead

Yes Elected.
X Incumbent.
^{1} Rounding error.

=== 1988 Federal Election: Yellowhead ===
Federal Election, 1988: Yellowhead, Alberta
Party	Candidate	Popular Vote	%
Progressive Conservative	Yes X Joe Clark	17,847	44.5%
Reform	Preston Manning	11,207	27.9%
New Democratic Party	Muriel Stanley Venne	6,172	15.4%
Liberal	John Higgerty	3,987	9.9%
Christian Heritage	John M. Torringa	708	1.8%
Confederation of Regions	Peter E. Hope	90	0.2%
Non-affiliated	Pat Geo. A. O'Hara	86	0.2%
Total		40,097	99.9%^{1}
Source: Library of Parliament – History of Federal Ridings since 1867: Yellowhead

Yes Elected.
X Incumbent.
^{1} Rounding error.

This was the only time when a former prime minister and leader of the opposition (Clark) and a future leader of the opposition (Manning) were candidates in the same riding election.

=== 2000 Federal By-Election: Kings–Hants ===
The 2000 by-election was triggered by the resignation of the incumbent Member of Parliament, Scott Brison, on July 24, 2000, to open a seat for Clark to re-enter the Commons.

Federal By-Election, September 11, 2000: Kings—Hants, Nova Scotia
Party	Candidate	Popular Vote	%
Progressive Conservative	Yes Joe Clark	14,525	53.4%
New Democratic Party	Kaye Johnson	7,375	27.1%
Alliance	Gerry Fulton	4,385	16.1%
Non-affiliated	Alex Neron	670	2.5%
Independent	John C. Turmel	221	0.8%
Total		27,176	99.9%^{1}
Source: – History of Federal Ridings since 1867: Kings—Hants

Yes Elected.
^{1} Rounding error.

=== 2000 Federal Election: Calgary Centre ===
Federal Election, 2000: Calgary Centre, Alberta
Party	Candidate	Popular Vote	%
Progressive Conservative	Yes Joe Clark	26,358	46.0%
Alliance	X Eric Lowther	22,054	38.5%
Liberal	Joanne Levy	5,630	9.8%
New Democratic Party	Don Lepan	1,604	2.8%
Green	Michael Alvarez-Toye	1,170	2.0%
Independent	Beverley Smith	293	0.5%
Marxist–Leninist	Margaret Peggy Askin	133	0.2%
Total		57,242	99.8%^{1}
Source: – History of Federal Ridings since 1867: Calgary Centre

Yes Elected.
X Incumbent.
^{1} Rounding error.

== Alberta constituency election: 1967 ==
1967 Alberta Election: Calgary South, Alberta
Party	Candidate	Popular Vote	%
Social Credit	Yes X Arthur J. Dixon	5,401	41.9%
Progressive Conservative	Joe Clark	4,940	38.4%
New Democratic Party	Jack Peters	1,388	10.8%
Liberal	Willis O'Leary	1,146	8.9%
Total		12,878	100.0%

Yes Elected.
X Incumbent.

== Progressive Conservative Party Leadership Conventions and Reviews: 1976 to 1983, 1997 ==
Clark ran in three leadership conventions and two leadership reviews. He was elected leader of the Progressive Conservative Party twice (1976, 1997), and defeated once (1983). After his victory in 1976, he succeeded Robert L. Stanfield as party leader. At the 1983 leadership convention, Clark was defeated by Brian Mulroney, who became leader. In 1998, he succeeded Jean Charest as party leader. Upon his retirement from politics in 2003, he was succeeded by Peter MacKay.

Clark also passed two leadership reviews after the 1980 general election, at the conventions of 1981 and 1983.

=== 1976 Leadership Convention ===
When Robert Stanfield announced his resignation as party leader in 1976, Clark was one of a crowded field of candidates in the leadership convention. He won the leadership on the fourth ballot.

Progressive Conservative Leadership Convention, February 22, 1976 Voting results by ballot
Candidate	First Ballot		Second Ballot		Third Ballot		Fourth Ballot	
Candidate	Votes cast	%	Votes cast	%	Votes cast	%	Votes cast	%
Claude Wagner	531	22.5%	667	28.5%	1,003	42.8%	1,122	48.6%
Brian Mulroney	357	15.1%	419	17.9%	369; Eliminated after third ballot.	15.8%	–	–
Joe Clark	277	11.7%	532	22.8%	969	41.4%	1,187	51.4%
Jack Horner	235	10.0%	286; Withdrew after second ballot.	12.2%	–	–	–	–
Paul Hellyer	231	9.8%	118; Withdrew after second ballot.	5.0%	–	–	–	–
Flora Macdonald	214	9.1%	239; Withdrew after second ballot.	10.2%	–	–	–	–
Sinclair Stevens	182; Withdrew after first ballot.	7.7%	–	–	–	–	–	–
John Allen Fraser	127	5.4%	34; Eliminated after second ballot.	1.5%	–	–	–	–
James Gillies	87; Withdrew after first ballot.	3.7%	–	–	–	–	–	–
Pat Nowlan	86	3.6%	42; Withdrew after second ballot.	1.8%	–	–	–	–
Heward Grafftey	33; Eliminated after first ballot.	1.4%	–	–	–	–	–	–
Total	2,360	100.0%	2,337	99.9%^{1}	2,341	100.0%	2,309	100.0%
Source: CPAC – 1976 Progressive Conservative Leadership Convention

^{1} Rounding error.

=== Leadership Reviews: 1981, 1983 ===
The Progressive Conservative party held leadership reviews of Clark's leadership at the conventions of 1981 and 1983. At the 1981 convention, 66.5% of the delegates voted in favour of Clark, with 33.5% voting against him. Clark continued on as leader, but at the 1983 convention, a similar review was held. Clark won 66.9% of the delegates, with 33.1% voting against him. He concluded that this level of support was not sufficient, and announced his resignation as leader, triggering an election convention, while also announcing that he planned to contest the leadership again at the convention.

=== 1983 Leadership Convention ===
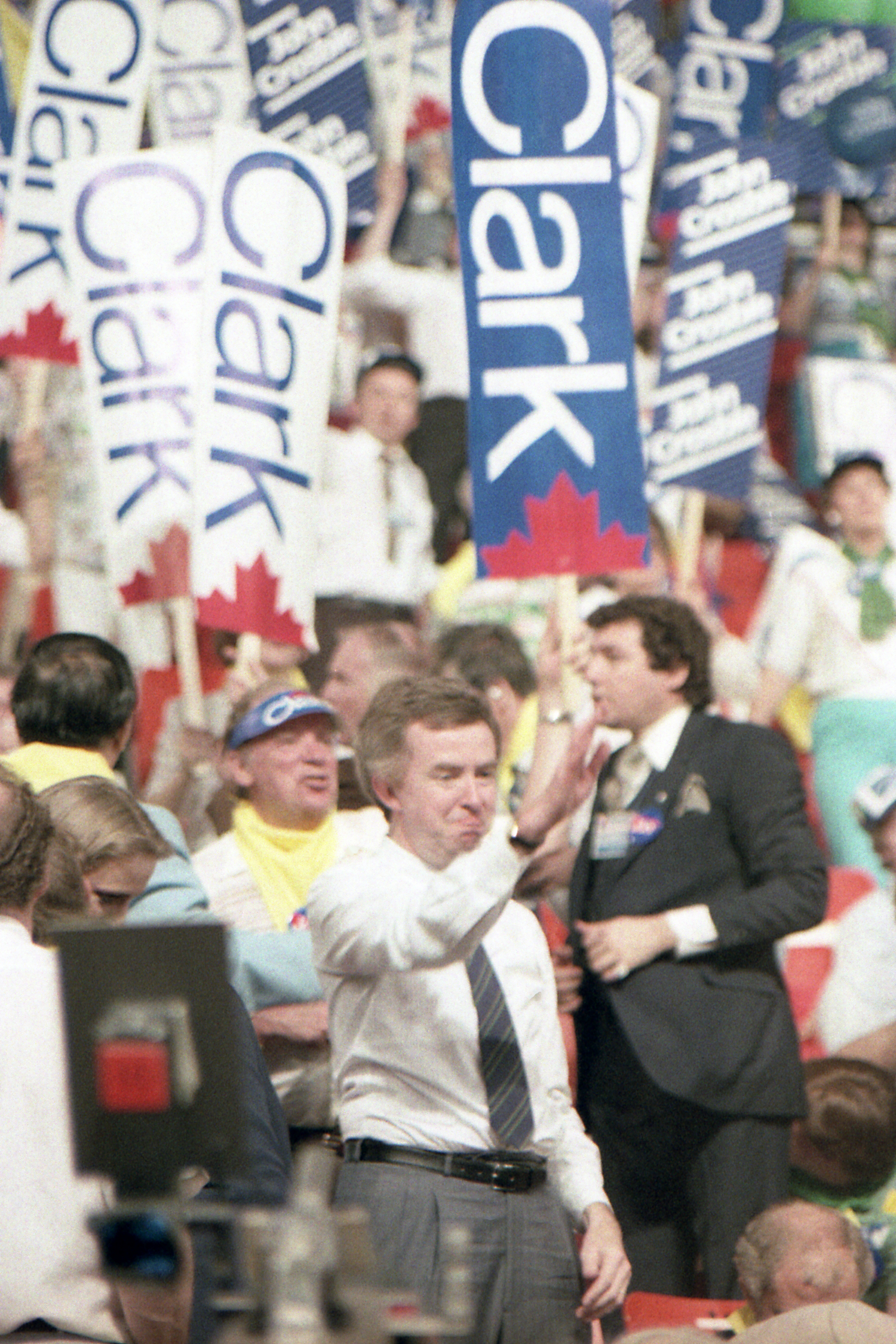
Clark at the 1983 leadership convention.

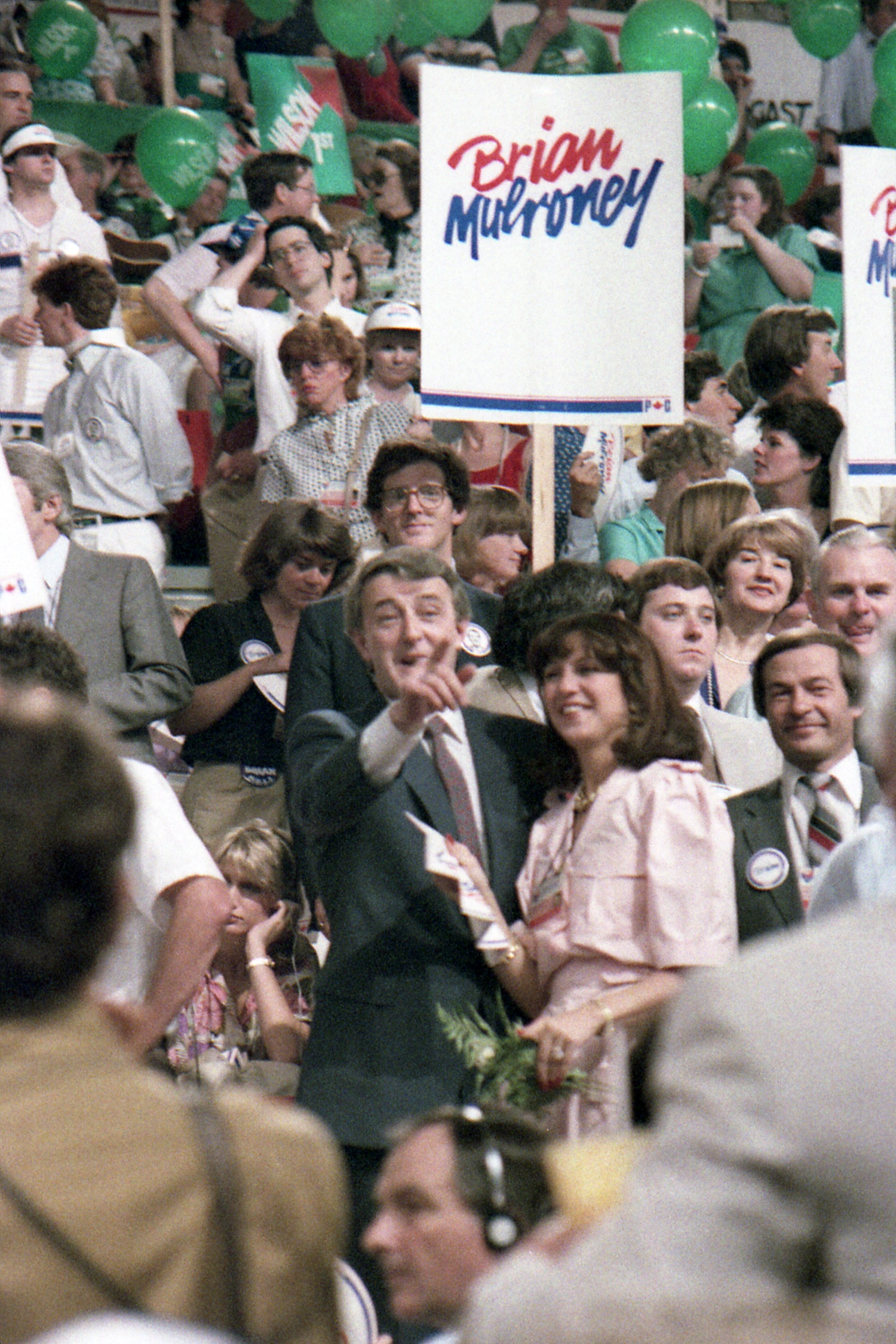
Mulroney at the 1983 leadership convention (photo by Alasdair Roberts).

The party held the leadership convention in the early summer of 1983. Clark was defeated on the fourth ballot by Brian Mulroney, who succeeded him as party leader.

Progressive Conservative Leadership Convention, June 11, 1983 Voting results by ballot
Candidate	First Ballot		Second Ballot		Third Ballot		Fourth Ballot	
Candidate	Votes cast	%	Votes cast	%	Votes cast	%	Votes cast	%
Joe Clark	1,091	36.5%	1,085	36.7%	1,058	35.8	1,325	45.6
Brian Mulroney	874	29.3%	1,021	34.6	1,036	35.1	1,584	54.4
John Crosbie	639	21.4%	781	26.4%	858; Eliminated after third ballot.	29.1%	–	–
Michael Wilson	144; Withdrew after first ballot.	4.8%	–	–	–	–	–	–
David Crombie	116	3.9%	67; Eliminated after second ballot.	2.3%	–	–	–	–
Peter Pocklington	102; Withdrew after first ballot.	3.4%	–	–	–	–	–	–
John A. Gamble	17; Withdrew after first ballot.	0.6%	–	–	–	–	–	–
Neil Fraser	5 Eliminated after first ballot.	0.2%	–	–	–	–	–	–
Total	2,988	100.1%^{1}	2,954	100.0	2,952	100.0%	2,910	100.0%
Source: CPAC – 1983 Progressive Conservative Leadership Convention

^{1} Rounding error.

=== 1998 Leadership Election ===
In 1998, the Progressive Conservative Party held its leadership election under a new system. Instead of a convention with delegates, each Progressive Conservative constituency association had 100 points in the leadership election. Every member of the party could vote at the constituency level, to determine the allocation of the points for each constituency. A candidate had to win a majority of points (not necessarily votes) to win the leadership. Clark came out of retirement and won the leadership on the second round of ballots.

Points by ballot
Candidate	First Ballot October 24		Second Ballot November 14	
Candidate	Points	%	Points	%
Joe Clark	14,592	48.5%	23,321	77.5%
Hugh Segal	5,689; Withdrew after first ballot.	18.9%	–	–
David Orchard	4,916	16.3%	6,779	22.5%
Brian Pallister	3,676; Withdrew after first ballot.	12.2%	–	–
Michael Fortier	1,227; Eliminated after first ballot.	4.1%	–	–
Total	30,100	100.0%	30,100	100.0%
Source: CPAC – 1998 Progressive Conservative Leadership Convention

== See also ==
- Electoral history of Pierre Trudeau – Clark's principal opponent in two general elections, with whom he alternated as prime minister.
- Electoral history of Brian Mulroney – Clark's successor as leader of the Progressive Conservative Party.
