= Party for the Commonwealth of Canada candidates in the 1988 Canadian federal election =

The Party for the Commonwealth Republic fielded several candidates in the 1993 federal election, none of whom were elected. Information about these candidates may be found here. The PCR was the political wing of Lyndon LaRouche's movement in Canada.

== Quebec ==
=== Laurentides: Jean Vigneault ===
Jean Vigneault was a Commonwealth Party candidates in two federal elections and one provincial election. He was twenty-six years old in 1985 and identified as an engineer.

Electoral record
| Election | Division | Party | Votes | % | Place | Winner |
|---|---|---|---|---|---|---|
| 1984 federal | Saint-Léonard—Anjou | Commonwealth | 145 | 0.24 | 6/6 | Alfonso Gagliano, Liberal |
| 1985 provincial | Sainte-Anne | Commonwealth | 108 | 0.52 | 5/7 | Maximilien Polak, Liberal |
| 1988 federal | Laurentides | Commonwealth | 249 | 0.44 | 6/6 | Jacques Vien, Progressive Conservative |

== Ontario ==
=== Eglinton—Lawrence: James Felicioni ===
James Felicioni was thirty-four years old, and listed himself as a kitchen manager. He received 122 votes (0.30%), finishing seventh against Liberal candidate Joe Volpe.
