= Electoral history of Pierre Trudeau =

Elections with Pierre Trudeau as a candidate

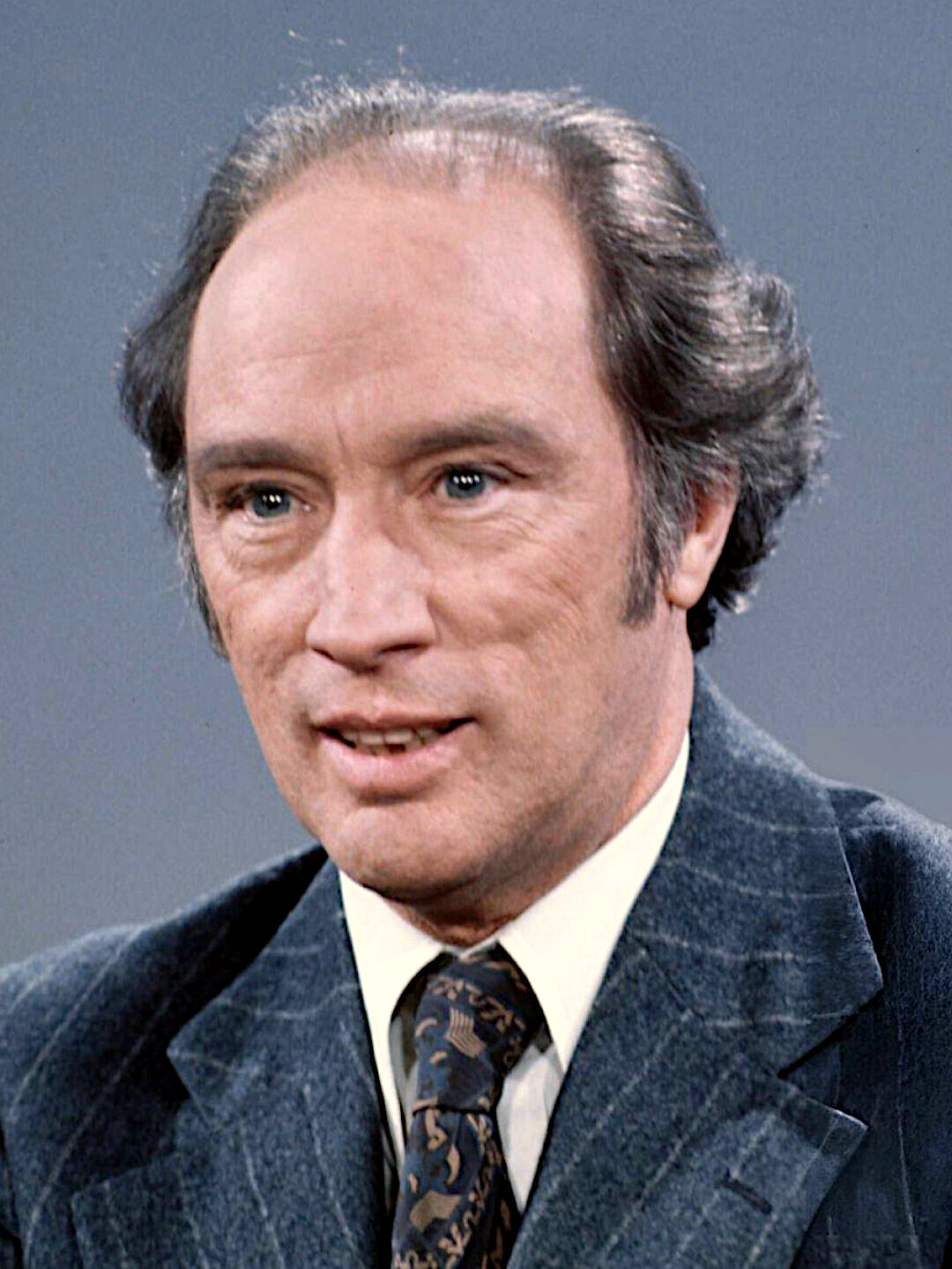
Pierre Trudeau in 1975.

This article is the Electoral history of Pierre Trudeau, the fifteenth Prime Minister of Canada.

A Liberal, he served two terms as prime minister (1968–1979; 1980–1984). He led the Liberal Party in five general elections, winning four (1968, 1972, 1974 and 1980) and losing one (1979). He won majority governments in 1968, 1974 and 1980, and a minority government in the 1972 election. With a total of fifteen years and 164 days in office, he is the third longest serving prime minister, after William Lyon Mackenzie King and Sir John A. Macdonald.

Trudeau succeeded Lester B. Pearson as prime minister in 1968. After Joe Clark won the 1979 election, Trudeau resigned and became Leader of the Opposition. The Clark government fell on a budget matter late in 1979 triggering the 1980 election, which returned Trudeau to office with a majority government. He retired in 1984 and was succeeded as Liberal leader and prime minister by John Turner.

Trudeau stood for election to the House of Commons of Canada six times, all for the riding of Mount Royal in Montreal, Quebec. He was elected with substantial majorities each time.

== Summary ==
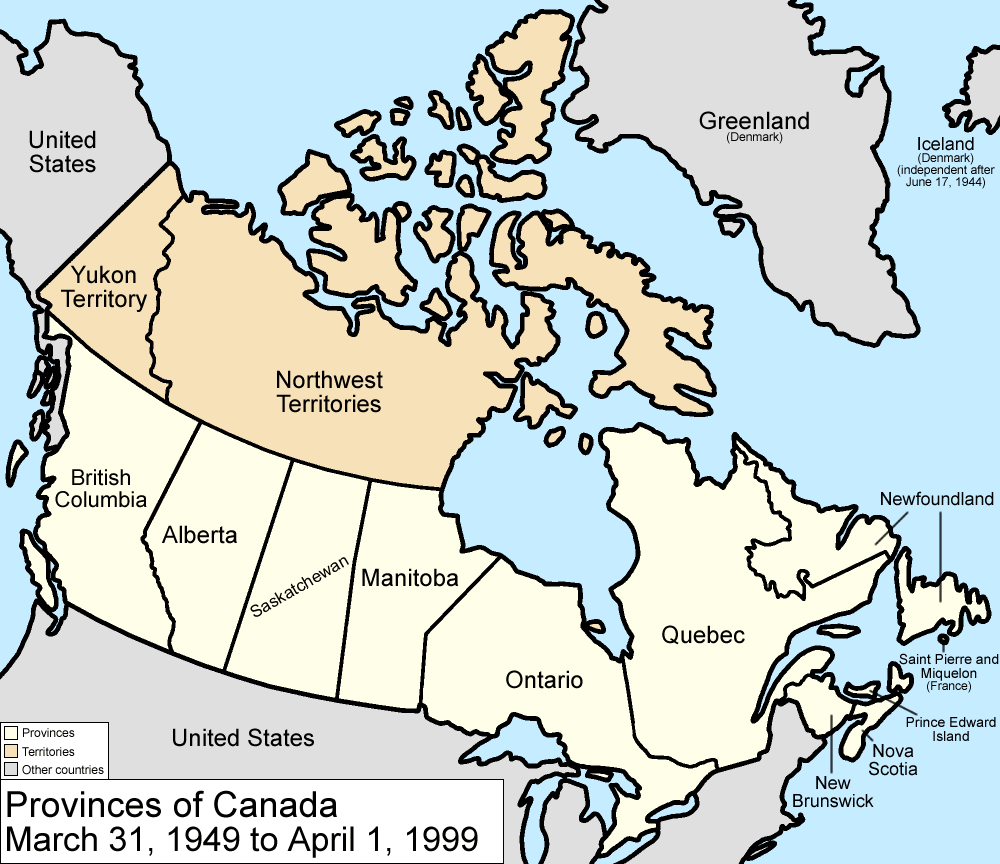
Canada had ten provinces and two territories throughout Trudeau's time as Prime Minister.

Trudeau ranks third out of twenty-three prime ministers for time in office, serving two terms totalling fifteen years and 164 days.

Trudeau was the fourth of four prime ministers to serve non-consecutive terms, the others being Sir John A. Macdonald, Arthur Meighen and William Lyon Mackenzie King.

Trudeau was the fourth of eight prime ministers from Quebec, the others being Sir John Abbott, Sir Wilfrid Laurier, Louis St. Laurent, Brian Mulroney, Jean Chrétien, Paul Martin and Justin Trudeau. He was also the third of five francophone prime ministers, the others being Laurier, St. Laurent, Chrétien, and Justin Trudeau.

Before entering politics, Trudeau was a federal public servant, an academic at the Université de Montréal and a social activist, particularly during the Asbestos Strike and as a founder and frequent contributor to the magazine Cité libre. Along with two other colleagues from Cité libre, Gerard Pelletier and Jean Marchand, he was invited by Prime Minister Lester Pearson to join the Liberal government in Ottawa to combat the rising Quebec separatism. Trudeau stood for election in Mount Royal in the general election of 1965, winning the seat. Pearson appointed him as his parliamentary secretary and then Minister of Justice. Following Pearson's announcement of his retirement in 1968, Trudeau ran for the leadership of the Liberal party with Pearson's tacit support. He won the leadership at the Liberal leadership convention of 1968 and became prime minister.

Trudeau led the Liberals in five general elections. He was successful in the general elections of 1968, 1972 (albeit with a minority government), and 1974, but was defeated by Joe Clark in the 1979 election. However, Clark's minority government was defeated late in 1979, triggering another election in early 1980, which Trudeau won.

Trudeau stood for election to the House of Commons six times (in 1965, 1968, 1972, 1974, 1979 and 1980), each time from the riding of Mount Royal, in Montreal, Quebec. He was elected with substantial majorities each election. His lowest vote count, in the 1965 election, was 55.6%, out of a field of four candidates. In his next election, in 1968 at the height of Trudeaumania, he received 90.8% of the votes in the riding. In the next four elections, he received over 70% in one election (1974), and over 80% of the votes in three elections (1972, 1979 and 1980). Trudeau served in the House of Commons for 18 years, 7 months and 22 days.

Trudeau won the Liberal leadership at the 1968 Liberal leadership convention, from a field of nine candidates. Trudeau won on the fourth ballot by the narrow margin of 51.1% over the runner-up, Robert Winters, who had 40.6% of the votes. Future prime minister John Turner came in third, with 8.3% of the votes. As Liberal leader, Trudeau then became prime minister.

== Federal general elections: 1968 to 1980 ==
Trudeau led the Liberal Party in five general elections. He won four (1968, 1972, 1974 and 1980) and lost one (1979). He won three majority governments in the 1968, 1974 and 1980 elections, and a minority government in the 1972 election.

Ternary plots of election results during Trudeau premiership
1968

1972

1974

1979

1980
Electoral districts identified by colours of winning parties

=== Federal general election: 1968 ===
Trudeau was elected leader of the Liberal Party on April 6, 1968. He called the election shortly afterwards and won a majority, defeating the Progressive Conservatives led by Robert L. Stanfield.

Canadian Federal Election, 1968 - Parties, Leaders, Seats Won and Popular Vote
Party	Leaders	Seats Won	Popular Vote
Liberal	Pierre Trudeau^{1}	154	45.4%
Progressive Conservative	Robert L. Stanfield^{2}	72	31.4%
New Democratic Party	Tommy Douglas	22	17.0%
Ralliement créditiste	Réal Caouette	14	4.4%
Independent	–	1	0.5%
Liberal-Labour	–	1	0.1%
Total		264	98.8%^{3}
Sources: Library of Parliament – History of Federal Ridings since 1867

^{1} Prime Minister when election was called; Prime Minister after election.
^{2} Leader of the Opposition when election was called; Leader of the Opposition after the election.
^{3} Table does not include parties which received votes but did not elect any members.

=== Federal general election: 1972 ===
Trudeau led the Liberals in the 1972 election and was returned to office, but with a minority government. Stanfield and the Progressive Conservatives won only two seats less than the Liberals.

Canadian Federal Election, 1972 - Parties, Leaders, Seats Won and Popular Vote
Party	Leaders	Seats Won	Popular Vote
Liberal	Pierre Trudeau^{1}	109	38.4%
Progressive Conservative	Robert L. Stanfield^{2}	107	35.0%
New Democratic Party	David Lewis	31	17.8%
Social Credit	Réal Caouette	15	7.6%
Independent	–	1	0.6%
No affiliation	–	1	0.3%
Total		264	99.7%^{3}
Sources: Library of Parliament – History of Federal Ridings since 1867

^{1} Prime Minister when election was called; Prime Minister after election.
^{2} Leader of the Opposition when election was called; Leader of the Opposition after the election.
^{3} Table does not include parties which received votes but did not elect any members.

=== Federal general election: 1974 ===
Trudeau led the Liberals in the 1974 election and was returned to office with a majority government, again defeating Stanfield and the Progressive Conservatives.

Canadian Federal Election, 1974 - Parties, Leaders, Seats Won and Popular Vote
Party	Leaders	Seats Won	Popular Vote
Liberal	Pierre Trudeau^{1}	141	43.2%
Progressive Conservative	Robert L. Stanfield^{2}	95	35.5%
New Democratic Party	David Lewis	16	15.4%
Social Credit	Réal Caouette	11	5.1%
Independent	–	1	0.4%
Total		264	99.6%^{3}
Sources: Library of Parliament – History of Federal Ridings since 1867

^{1} Prime Minister when election was called; Prime Minister after election.
^{2} Leader of the Opposition when election was called; Leader of the Opposition after the election.
^{3} Table does not include parties which received votes but did not elect any members.

=== Federal general election: 1979 ===
Trudeau led the Liberals in the 1979 election and was defeated. He resigned as prime minister. Joe Clark, the new leader of the Progressive Conservatives, formed a short-lived minority government.

Canadian Federal Election, 1979 - Parties, Leaders, Seats Won and Popular Vote
Party	Leaders	Seats Won	Popular Vote
Progressive Conservative	Joe Clark^{1}	136	35.9%
Liberal	Pierre Trudeau^{2}	114	40.1%
New Democratic Party	Ed Broadbent	26	17.9%
Social Credit	Fabien Roy	6	4.6%
Total		282	98.5%^{3}
Sources: Library of Parliament – History of Federal Ridings since 1867

^{1} Leader of the Opposition when election was called; Prime Minister after election.
^{2} Prime Minister when election was called; Leader of the Opposition after the election.
^{3} Table does not include parties which received votes but did not elect any members.

=== Federal general election: 1980 ===
After the 1979 election, Trudeau indicated he would resign as party leader, but would stay on as interim Leader of the Opposition. However, before the Liberals could elect a new leader, the Clark government fell in December 1979 when the opposition parties defeated the budget in the Commons. Trudeau led the Liberals in the resulting election and was returned to power with a majority. Clark became the Leader of the Opposition.

Canadian Federal Election, 1980 - Parties, Leaders, Seats Won and Popular Vote
Party	Leaders	Seats Won	Popular Vote
Liberal	Pierre Trudeau^{1}	147	44.3%
Progressive Conservative	Joe Clark^{2}	103	32.5%
New Democratic Party	Ed Broadbent	32	19.8%
Total		282	96.6%^{3}
Sources: Library of Parliament – History of Federal Ridings since 1867

^{1} Leader of the Opposition when election was called; Prime Minister after election.
^{2} Prime Minister when election was called; Leader of the Opposition after the election.
^{3} Table does not include parties which received votes but did not elect any members.

== Federal constituency elections: 1965 to 1980 ==
Trudeau stood for election to the House of Commons six times (in 1965, 1968, 1972, 1974, 1979 and 1980). He was elected all six times, each time from the riding of Mount Royal, in Montreal, Quebec.

=== 1965 Federal Election: Mount Royal ===
Federal Election, 1965: Mount Royal, Quebec
Party	Candidate	Popular Vote	%
Liberal	Yes Pierre Trudeau	28,064	55.6%
New Democratic Party	Charles Taylor	14,929	29.6%
Progressive Conservative	Peter S. Wise	6,840	13.6%
Ralliement Créditiste	Michel Smith	598	1.2%
Total		50,431	100.0%
Source: Library of Parliament – History of Federal Ridings since 1867: Mount Royal

Yes Elected.

=== 1968 Federal Election: Mount Royal ===
Federal Election, 1968: Mount Royal, Quebec
Party	Candidate	Popular Vote	%
Liberal	Yes X Pierre Trudeau	37,402	90.8%
Progressive Conservative	Huguette Marleau	1,965	4.8%
New Democratic Party	Jussy Brainin	1,583	3.8%
Independent	Walter Gallagher	182	0.4%
Ralliement Créditiste	Michel Lamonde	80	0.2%
Total		41,212	100.0%
Source: Library of Parliament – History of Federal Ridings since 1867: Mount Royal

Yes Elected.
X Incumbent.

=== 1972 Federal Election: Mount Royal ===
Federal Election, 1972: Mount Royal, Quebec
Party	Candidate	Popular Vote	%
Liberal	Yes X Pierre Trudeau	36,875	80.6%
Progressive Conservative	Andrew Albert Brichant	4,446	9.7%
New Democratic Party	Harold Yudin	3,274	7.2%
Social Credit	Alexander O. Bronstein	625	1.4%
Non-Affiliated	Gaston Miron	433	0.9%
Non-Affiliated	Robert A. Cruise	80	0.2%
Total		45,733	100.0%
Source: Library of Parliament – History of Federal Ridings since 1867: Mount Royal

Yes Elected.
X Incumbent.

=== 1974 Federal Election: Mount Royal ===
Federal Election, 1974: Mount Royal, Quebec
Party	Candidate	Popular Vote	%
Liberal	Yes X Pierre Trudeau	32,166	75.0%
Progressive Conservative	Émile Mashaal	5,723	13.3%
New Democratic Party	Joe Rabinovitch	4,214	9.8%
Social Credit	Bertrand Marcil	414	1.0%
Independent	Edward J. Ommer	211	0.5%
Marxist–Leninist	Robert A. Cruise	162	0.4%
Total		42,890	100.0
Source: Library of Parliament – History of Federal Ridings since 1867: Mount Royal

Yes Elected.
X Incumbent.

=== 1979 Federal Election: Mount Royal ===
Federal Election, 1979: Mount Royal, Quebec
Party	Candidate	Popular Vote	%
Liberal	Yes X Pierre Trudeau	43,202	85.2%
Progressive Conservative	J. David Dejong	3,660	7.2%
New Democratic Party	David C. Winch	2,023	4.0%
Social Credit	Laflèche Trudeau	1,049	2.1%
Rhinoceros	Jacques Ferron	649	1.3%
Communist	David G. Johnston	81	0.2%
Marxist–Leninist	Robert Verrier	61	0.1%
Total		50,725	100.1%^{1}
Source: Library of Parliament – History of Federal Ridings since 1867: Mount Royal

Yes Elected.
X Incumbent.
^{1} Rounding error.

=== 1980 Federal Election: Mount Royal ===
Federal Election, 1980: Mount Royal, Quebec
Party	Candidate	Popular Vote	%
Liberal	Yes X Pierre Trudeau	33,821	81.2%
Progressive Conservative	Harry Bloomfield	4,402	10.6%
New Democratic Party	David C. Winch	2,356	5.7%
Rhinoceros	Michel Flybin Rivard	715	1.7%
Independent	Gordon Edwards	149	0.4%
Libertarian	Paul Eddie	126	0.3%
Marxist–Leninist	Liz Watkins	68	0.2%
Total		41,637	100.1%^{1}
Source: Library of Parliament – History of Federal Ridings since 1867: Mount Royal

Yes Elected.
X Incumbent.
^{1} Rounding error.

== 1968 Liberal Party leadership election ==
Trudeau won the leadership on the fourth ballot. His main opponents were Paul Hellyer and Robert Winters, both former ministers in Pearson's governments.

Liberal Leadership Convention, April 6, 1968 Voting results by ballot
Candidate	First Ballot		Second Ballot		Third Ballot		Fourth Ballot	
Candidate	Votes cast	%	Votes cast	%	Votes cast	%	Votes cast	%
Pierre Trudeau	752	31.8%	964	40.8%	1051	44.6%	1,203	51.1%
Paul Hellyer	330	13.9%	465	19.7%	377; Withdrew after third ballot.	16.0%	–	–
Robert Winters	293	12.4%	473	20.0%	621	26.3%	954	40.6%
John Turner	277	11.7%	347	14.7%	279	11.8%	195	8.3%
Paul Martin Sr.	277; Withdrew after first ballot.	11.7%	–	–	–	–	–	–
Joe Greene	169	7.1%	104	4.4%	29; Eliminated after third ballot.	1.2%	–	–
Allan MacEachen	165	6.9%	11; Eliminated after second ballot.	0.5%	–	–	–	–
Eric Kierans	103; Withdrew after first ballot.	4.3%	–	–	–	–	–	–
Harold Lloyd Henderson	0 Eliminated after first ballot.	0.0%	–	–	–	–	–	–
Total	2,366	99.8%^{1}	2,364	100.1%^{1}	2,357	99.9%^{1}	2,352	100.0%
Source: CPAC - 1968 Liberal Convention

^{1} Rounding error.

== See also ==
- Electoral history of Lester B. Pearson – Trudeau's predecessor as leader of the Liberal Party and as prime minister.
- Electoral history of Joe Clark – Trudeau's principal opponent in two general elections, with whom he alternated as prime minister.
- Electoral history of John Turner – Trudeau's successor as leader of the Liberal Party and as prime minister.
