= Opinion polling for the 1984 Canadian federal election =

This article is about polls leading up to the 1984 Canadian federal election.

== Campaign Period ==
Evolution of voting intentions at national level
Polling firm	Last day of survey	Source	PC	LPC	NDP	Other	ME	Sample
Election 1984	September 4, 1984		50.03	28.02	18.81	3.14		
Thompson-Lightstone	August 1984		51	26	21	2	3.0	2,000
Gallup	August 29, 1984		50	28	19	3	—	2,078
CTV	August 29, 1984		51	26	21	2	—	2,000
Sorecom	August 26, 1984		50	27	21	2	—	1,206
Carleton-Southam	August 22, 1984		56.5	27	15	1.5	—	1,533
The Globe-CROP	August 19, 1984		49	32	18	1	—	1,398
Gallup	August 13, 1984		46	32	18	2	—	1,033
CBC	August 12, 1984		49	32	18	—	—	2,661
Carleton-Southam	August 7, 1984		51	32	16	—	3	1,969
Thompson-Lightstone	August 1984		45	36	17	2	3	2,000
CTV	July 31, 1984		45	36	17	2	—	2,000
French and English leader's debates held (July 24 & 25, 1984)
Carleton-Southam	July 12, 1984		42.5	45	9.5	3	3	1,502
Official call of federal elections (July 9, 1984)

== During the 32nd Parliament of Canada ==
Evolution of voting intentions at national level
Polling firm	Last day of survey	Source	PC	LPC	NDP	Other	ME	Sample
The Globe-CROP	July 8, 1984		39	49	11	—	—	1,950
Gallup	July 7, 1984		39	48	11	—	—	1,049
Thompson-Lightstone	June 1984		39	49	10	2	—	—
John Turner becomes Prime Minister (June 30, 1984)
John Turner becomes Liberal Party leader (June 16, 1984)
Carleton-Southam	May 8, 1984		45	43.5	9.5	—	—	—
The Globe-CROP	May 4, 1984		46	41	11	—	—	1,942
The Globe-CROP	April 1984		46	41	11	1	—	—
Gallup	April 1984		40	46	13	—	—	—
The Globe-Crop	March 16, 1984		50	38	11	1	2.0	1,946
The Globe-CROP	March 1984		50	38	11	1	—	—
Pierre Elliot Trudeau announces his resignation as Liberal Party leader and Prime Minister (February 29, 1984)
Gallup	February, 1984		48	36	13	—	—	—
The Globe-Crop	December 5, 1983		51	36	12	1	2.0	1,946
Gallup	December 3, 1983		53	30	15	—	4.0	1,064
The Globe-CROP	November 1983		51	36	12	1	—	—
Gallup	October 27, 1983		56	27	16	—	4.0	1,028
CRT Telephone Interviewing Systems	September 1983		55	33	10	—	—	1,069
The Globe-CROP	September 1983		53	30	16	1	—	—
Gallup	September 1983		62	23	14	—	4	1,039
The Globe-CROP	June 1983		54	32	14	1	—	—
Brian Mulroney becomes leader of the Progressive Conservative Party (June 11, 1983)
The Globe-CROP	April 1983		52	31	16	1	—	—
The Globe-CROP	February 1983		47	32	19	1	—	—
The Globe-CROP	November 1982		48	33	18	1	—	—
The Globe-CROP	September 1982		48	29	21	1	—	—
Gallup	July 5, 1982		47	28	23	—	4.0	1,034
The Globe-CROP	June 1982		44	26	26	3	—	—
Gallup	June 1982		43	32	23	1	4.0	—
Gallup	May 1982		44	33	21	—	—	—
The Globe-CROP	April 1982		42	31	25	2	—	—
Gallup	April 1982		39	34	24	—	—	—
Gallup	March 1982		42	31	24	—	—	—
The Globe-CROP	February 1982		38	33	27	3	—	—
Gallup	February 1982		36	35	26	—	—	—
Gallup	January 9, 1982		40	38	20	—	4.0	—
Gallup	December 1981		39	35	22	—	—	—
The Globe-CROP	November 1981		39	35	24	2	—	—
Gallup	November 1981		42	38	18	—	—	—
Gallup	October 1981		40	40	20	—	—	—
The Globe-CROP	September 1981		41	33	23	3	—	—
Gallup	September 1981		39	38	20	—	—	—
Gallup	August 1981		39	42	16	—	—	—
The Globe-CROP	June 1981		39	37	22	2	—	—
Gallup	May 9, 1981		37	42	18	—	—	1,043
Globe-CROP	May 4, 1981		39	42	16	—	—	—
The Globe-CROP	April 1981		34	47	18	2	—	—
Gallup	April 1981		37	43	19	—	—	—
Gallup	March 1981		35	46	18	—	—	1,042
The Globe-CROP	February 1981		37	42	19	2	—	—
Gallup	February 1981		37	42	19	—	—	1,000
Gallup	January 1981		34	40	23	—	—	—
Gallup	December 1980		34	44	20	—	—	—
Gallup	November 1980		31	45	22	—	—	—
The Globe-CROP	November 1980		35	45	18	2	—	—
The Globe-CROP	September 1980		32	50	14	3	—	—
The Globe-CROP	June 1980		32	47	29	1	—	—
The Globe-CROP	April 1980		30	46	21	3	—	—
The Globe-CROP	February 1980		33	44	20	3	—	—
Election 1980	February 18, 1980		32.45	44.34	19.77	3.44		

== Regional polling ==
=== Quebec ===
Evolution of voting intentions at national level
Polling firm	Last day of survey	Source	PC	LPC	NDP	PN	Other	Undecided	ME	Sample
Election 1984	September 4, 1984		50.2	35.4	8.8	2.5	3.1			
Carleton University	August 22, 1984		56	32	9	—	3	—	—	—
Sorecom	May 30, 1984		28	61	5	5	1	—	1.25−2.88	2,031
Sorecom	February 28, 1984		36	52	6	5	—	—	—	—
Sorecom	November 26, 1983		39	50	6	4	—	—	—	1,209
Segma	September 26, 1983		33	60	4	3	—	14	3.6	797
CRT Telephone Interviewing Systems	September 1983		33	56	5	—	6	—	—	—
Gallup	August 1983		40	50	—	—	—	—	—	—
Election 1980	February 18, 1980		12.6	68.2	9.1	—	10.1			
