= You had an option, sir =

Quote in Canadian politics by Brian Mulroney

"You had an option, sir" (sometimes remembered as You had a choice, sir) was a phrase used by Brian Mulroney against John Turner during the English-language leaders debate in the 1984 Canadian federal election. The exchange is considered one of the only "knockout blows" in the history of Canadian political debate.

== Background ==
After deciding to leave office in February 1984, Pierre Trudeau retired as Prime Minister of Canada in June of that year. Polls showed that he would almost certainly be defeated by Mulroney and the Progressive Conservatives in the next election. Trudeau's Liberals chose Turner, a former Cabinet minister under Trudeau and Lester B. Pearson, as their new leader in a bitterly contested leadership convention in which Turner defeated six rivals, most notably Trudeau's preferred successor Jean Chrétien.

Just four days after being sworn in as prime minister, Turner called a general election for September, persuaded by internal polls which showed the Liberals far ahead, even though he was not obligated to dissolve Parliament until 1985. This proved disastrous as Turner initially appeared rusty and old fashioned, using outmoded slang on several occasions that made voters see him as a relic from the past, causing the Liberals to fall far behind in polls. Most famously, he spoke of "make-work programs," a term that had long ago fallen into disfavour compared to the less-patronizing "job-creation programs."

The campaign is best remembered for Mulroney's attacks on a raft of Liberal patronage appointments. In his final days in office, Trudeau had controversially appointed a flurry of senators, judges, and executives on various governmental and crown corporation boards. This was widely seen as a way to offer "plum jobs" to long-time Liberals loyal to the Trudeau-Chrétien faction of the party.

However, the appointments were not finalized prior to Trudeau's leaving office. The new prime minister, Turner, therefore had the right to recommend that Governor General Jeanne Sauvé cancel the appointments—advice that Sauvé would have been obligated to follow in accordance with Canadian constitutional practice. However, such a move would almost certainly have further alienated the Trudeau-Chrétien faction of the Liberal Party, something Turner's advisors believed the party could not risk provoking on the eve of an election. Despite strong pressure for Turner to scuttle the appointments, he refused to do so. Instead, he proceeded to appoint several more Liberals to prominent political offices. Turner cited a written agreement which would see Trudeau retire early in return for the appointments being made.

== Televised debate ==
The English language debate was held on July 25, 1984. Ironically, Turner had planned to attack Mulroney over the patronage machine that the latter had allegedly set up in anticipation of victory. He launched what appeared to be the start of a blistering attack on Mulroney by comparing his patronage machine to that of the old Union Nationale in Quebec. However, Mulroney successfully turned the tables by pointing to the recent raft of Liberal patronage appointments. He had earlier made light of the appointments while on the hustings, but publicly apologized for doing so. He then demanded that Turner apologize to the country for making "these horrible appointments." Turner was taken by surprise by Mulroney's retort, and replied that "I had no option" except to let the appointments stand. Before moderator David Johnston could move the debate onto the next question, Mulroney interjected and famously responded:

You had an option, sir. You could have said, 'I am not going to do it. This is wrong for Canada, and I am not going to ask Canadians to pay the price.' You had an option, sir — to say 'no' — and you chose to say 'yes' to the old attitudes and the old stories of the Liberal Party. That sir, if I may say respectfully, that is not good enough for Canadians.

Turner, clearly flustered by this withering riposte from Mulroney, could only repeat "I had no option." A visibly angry Mulroney replied:

That is an avowal of failure! That is a confession of non-leadership. And this country needs leadership. You had an option, sir. You could have done better.

The exchange led most of the papers the next day, with most of them paraphrasing Mulroney's counterattack as "You had an option, sir — you could have said 'no.'"

== Aftermath ==
Mulroney later disclosed to journalist Peter C. Newman that he did not know his "You had an option" response would be positively received as he was speaking it. He claimed, "At this point, I know there's been a dramatic, historic exchange, but I wasn't sure whether I had helped or hurt my case. I really wasn't. As the debate ended, I could see from the New Democratic Party leader Ed Broadbent's attitude that I had scored heavily."

After the televised debate, little else altered the course of the campaign. In the September election, the Tories won 211 seats, the most that a Canadian party has ever won, while the Liberals lost 95 seats, the worst defeat at the time for a governing party at the federal level in Canada.
