= Liberal Party of Canada candidates in the 1984 Canadian federal election =

The governing Liberal Party of Canada fielded a full slate of candidates in the 1984 Canadian federal election, and won forty seats to become the Official Opposition in the parliament that followed.

Many of the party's candidates have their own biography pages. Information on others may be found here.

== Ontario ==
=== Brant: Peter Hexamer ===
Peter Hexamer is a retired electrical contractor in Brantford. He served on the Brant County council for four years before 1980, and in the 1980 municipal election he won election to the Brantford City Council in a temporary ward covering land annexed from the county. He was re-elected to council in the 1982 election for the city's second ward. After running the House of Commons, he did not seek re-election in 1985.

After retiring as an electrical contractor, Hexamer started a manufacturing firm and has been credited with inventing a new, highly reliable form of bicycle lock. He has also been active with the Brant Waterways Foundation. He works for a company that installs wind farm, and he was profiled in 2010 for setting up a project in St. Kitts and Nevis.

Electoral record (partial)
Election	Division	Party	Votes	%	Place	Winner
1980 Brantford municipal	City Council, Ward Six	n/a	520	65.16	1/2	himself
1982 Brantford municipal	City Council, Ward Two	n/a	2,668	30.88	2/5	Bob Lancaster and himself
1984 federal	Brant	Liberal	7,286	13.94	3/4	Derek Blackburn, New Democratic Party

== Manitoba ==
=== Winnipeg—Birds Hill: Lil Johnson ===
Lil Johnson was a service representative in 1984. She acknowledged that she had little chance of winning and admitted that she had not thought out her position on many national issues. When asked for her views on selling crown corporations, she asked her interviewer to define the term. She received 5,447 votes (10.44%), finishing third against New Democratic Party incumbent Bill Blaikie.
