= Party for the Commonwealth of Canada candidates in the 1984 Canadian federal election =

LaRouche-aligned former political party

The Party for the Commonwealth of Canada (PCC) ran 66 candidates in the 1984 federal election, none of whom were elected. The PCC was the political wing of Lyndon LaRouche's movement in Canada.

== Quebec ==
=== Richelieu: Yves Julien ===
Yves Julien listed himself as a student. He received 76 votes (0.16%), finishing seventh against Progressive Conservative candidate Louis Plamondon.

== Ontario ==
=== Hamilton East: Ken Perry ===
Perry listed himself as an electrician. He had previously campaigned in a provincial by-election in 1979 as the candidate of another Larouchite organization, the North American Labour Party (Toronto Star, 5 April 1979). The NALP was not a registered party, and Perry's political affiliation did not appear on the ballot.

Electoral record
Election	Division	Party	Votes	%	Place	Winner
by-election, 5 April 1979, provincial	Wentworth	Ind. (NALP)	171		4/4	Colin Isaacs, New Democratic Party
1984 federal	Hamilton East	PCC	59	0.15	6/6	Sheila Copps, Liberal
