= Communist Party of Canada candidates in the 1984 Canadian federal election =

The Communist Party of Canada fielded several candidates in the 1984 federal election, none of whom were elected.

== Ontario ==
=== Nancy (Nan) McDonald (Eglinton—Lawrence) ===
McDonald was a frequent candidate for public office, campaigning for the Communist Party and the federal, provincial and municipal levels. She was a social worker in private life, and was the Central Women's organizer for the Communist Party in 1979.

In 1986, she was listed a representative of the organization Consumers Against Rising Prices. During the same year, she criticized the mainstream Canadian press for not publishing the details of a peace initiative launched by Union of Soviet Socialist Republics leader Mikhail Gorbachev.

Electoral record
Election	Division	Party	Votes	%	Place	Winner
1974 federal	Hamilton Mountain	Communist	170		4/5	Gus MacFarlane, Liberal
1975 provincial	Port Arthur	Communist	247		4/5	Gus MacFarlane, Liberal
1976 Toronto municipal	School Trustee Ward Five	n/a	2,614		3/5	Judith Major and Jim Lemon
1979 federal	Thunder Bay—Nipigon	Communist	174		4/5	Bob Andras, Liberal
1980 federal	York West	Communist	85		5/6	Jim Fleming, Liberal
1981 provincial	Oakwood	Communist	624	3.18	4/4	Tony Grande, New Democratic Party
1982 Toronto municipal	Ward Three Council	n/a	1,415		4/4	Richard Gilbert and Joseph Piccininni
1984 federal	Eglinton—Lawrence	Communist	219		6/6	Roland de Corneille, Liberal

Please note: The 1982 municipal totals are taken from the Globe and Mail, newspaper, 9 November 1982 (90 out of 91 polls reporting).
