= Libertarian Party of Canada candidates in the 1984 Canadian federal election =

Listing of candidates

The Libertarian Party of Canada fielded a number of candidates in the 1984 Canadian general election, none of whom were elected. Information about these candidates may be found on this page.

== Myron Petriw (York South—Weston) ==
Petriw had previously campaigned for the Libertarian Party of Ontario in a provincial by-election. During the provincial campaign, Petriw indicated that he had lived in York South since 1963, and worked at an automobile plant in Oakville.

Electoral record
Election	Division	Party	Votes	%	Place	Winner
Ontario provincial by-election, 4 November 1982	York South	Libertarian	234	1.0	4/5	Bob Rae, New Democratic Party
1984 federal	York South—Weston	Libertarian	281		5/6	John Nunziata, Liberal
