= Party for the Commonwealth of Canada =

Canadian Larouche movement political party

- Abbreviation: PCC
- Leader: Gilles Gervais
- Preceded by: North American Labour Party
- Ideology: LaRouche movement Fanaticism; Conspiratorial
- International affiliation: International Caucus of Labor Committees

The Party for the Commonwealth of Canada was a political party that supported the ideology of the far-right U.S. politician Lyndon LaRouche. The party ran candidates in the 1984, 1988 and 1993 elections.

The party originated as the North American Labour Party, an unregistered political party that nominated candidates in the 1970s and ran them as independents in several federal, provincial, and municipal elections. It was the Canadian counterpart of the U.S. Labor Party and affiliated with the LaRouche movement's International Caucus of Labor Committees.

In the 1988 election, party leader Gilles Gervais led a slate of 58 candidates campaigning against the monarchy, hemispheric free trade, dollarization of Latin American economies, and financial oligarchy.

The party never won any seats. It was also known as the Party for the Commonwealth-Republic, and as the Committee for the Republic of Canada.

The North American Labour Party nominated candidates in two provincial elections in British Columbia. In the 11 December 1975 election, the party's four candidates collected 141 votes, less than 0.01% of the popular vote. In the 26 April 1979 elections, its four candidates collected 297 votes, 0.02% of the popular vote.

The NALP also ran candidates in the 1975 and 1977 provincial elections in the province of Ontario. The party was not registered in 1977, and its six candidates appeared on the ballot as independents. NALP candidates also ran in Toronto and Montreal municipal elections of 1978.

In an interview with the Toronto Star, published on June 6, 1977, party spokesman Joe Brewda argued that, while his party was rooted in socialism, it also draws ideas from other political viewpoints. He is quoted as saying, "our program is based on economic growth and represents the vital interests of conservative industrialists, workers and some scientific layers". He also argued in support of a gold-backed monetary system, and alleged that his party would have received 15% of the vote in the previous election had it not been for massive voter fraud.

An article from The Globe and Mail of January 2, 1980 lists Richard Sanders as the main Toronto organizer of the NALP, and accuses the party of antisemitism. Sanders is cited in this article as alleging massive voter fraud against his party.

During the 1978 mayoral contest, Sanders was quoted as making the following statements: "The trouble with Toronto, is its porno press, the Sun, Star and Globe and Mail! I'm the one to stop banks running drugs into Canada from the Cayman Islands. Smith, O'Donohue and Sewell are puffballs!" (Globe and Mail, 1 November 1978)

Electoral results
Year	Type of election	# of candidates	# of votes	% of popular vote
1984	General	65	7,061	0.06%
1988	General	58	7,467	0.06%
1993	General	59	7,502	0.05%

== See also ==
- List of political parties in Canada
- Commonwealth Party candidates, 1993 Canadian federal election
- Commonwealth Party candidates, 1988 Canadian federal election
- Commonwealth Party candidates, 1984 Canadian federal election
- North American Labour Party
