= Larry Duchesne =

Canadian politician

Leader of the New Democratic Party of Prince Edward Island
- In office 1991–1995
- Preceded by: Dody Crane (interim)
- Succeeded by: Herb Dickieson

Personal details
- Born: March 23, 1949 (age 77)
- Party: New Democratic Party
- Profession: teacher

Larry Duchesne (born 1949) is a Canadian politician, who was leader of the Prince Edward Island New Democratic Party from 1991 to 1995.

A teacher and former journalist from Kinkora, Prince Edward Island, he won the party leadership on February 3, 1991, over Mike Leclair and Judy Whittaker. He had previously been a candidate for the party in provincial elections in both Prince Edward Island and Nova Scotia.

He led the party into the 1993 election, and was the party's assemblyman candidate in 4th Prince, but won no seats on election day. Following the election loss, he took a three-month unpaid leave of absence from his position as leader, so that he could collect unemployment benefits and thus save the party money through not having to pay his leader's salary.

He resigned as party leader in November 1994, and was succeeded in 1995 by Herb Dickieson.

He ran as the party's candidate in the new district of Parkdale-Belvedere in the 1996 election, but was again not elected to the legislature. In the 1997 federal election, he ran in the district of Cardigan, but did not win the seat.

Duchesne was the Nova Scotia New Democratic Party candidate in Cumberland South for the 2013 Nova Scotia provincial election, but was defeated by Progressive Conservative leader Jamie Baillie. In February 2017, Duchesne was again nominated as Cumberland South's NDP candidate for the 2017 Nova Scotia general election.

He is the NDP candidate in Cumberland—Colchester in the 2025 Canadian federal election after having contested 2019.

At the time of the 2025 Canadian federal election, he lived in River Philip, Nova Scotia.

== Electoral record ==
2025 Canadian federal election: Cumberland—Colchester
Party	Candidate	Votes	%	±%	Expenditures
Liberal	Alana Hirtle	23,929	48.3	+14.3	
Conservative	Stephen Ellis	22,701	45.8	+0.1	
New Democratic	Larry Duchesne	1,873	3.8	-8.5	
Green	Kelly-Ann Callaghan	694	1.4	-1.2	
People's	Paul Church	333	0.7	-3.5	
Total valid votes/expense limit		49,530	99.4	+0.1	127,507.40
Total rejected ballots		310	0.6	-0.1	
Turnout		49,840	70.8	+10.7	
Eligible voters (Note: Number of eligible voters does not include election day registrations.)		70,370			
Liberal gain from Conservative		Swing		+7.1	
Source: Elections Canada

2024 Nova Scotia general election: Cumberland South
Party	Candidate	Votes	%	±%
Progressive Conservative	Tory Rushton	3,442	77.21	8.74
Liberal	Liam D. MacDonald	540	12.11	-7.06
New Democratic	Larry Duchesne	476	10.68	1.48
Total		4,458	–	
Total rejected ballots		37		
Turnout		4,496	38.07	
Eligible voters		11,810		
Progressive Conservative hold		Swing		
Source: Elections Nova Scotia

2021 Nova Scotia general election: Cumberland South
Party	Candidate	Votes	%	±%	Expenditures
Progressive Conservative	Tory Rushton	3,900	68.47	+9.28	$29,144.30
Liberal	Rollie Lawless	1,092	19.17	-12.51	$22,771.07
New Democratic	Larry Duchesne	524	9.20	+4.14	$1,495.12
Green	Nicholas Hendren	180	3.16	-0.91	$200.00
Total valid votes/expense limit		5,696	99.46	–	$66,923.01
Total rejected ballots		31	0.54		
Turnout		5,727	52.12		
Eligible voters		10,989			
Progressive Conservative hold		Swing		+10.90	
Source: Elections Nova Scotia

2019 Canadian federal election: Cumberland—Colchester
Party	Candidate	Votes	%	±%	Expenditures
Liberal	Lenore Zann	16,672	36.68	−27.05	$91,456.57
Conservative	Scott Armstrong	16,219	35.69	+9.23	none listed
Green	Jason Blanch	6,015	13.23	+9.67	$9,366.06
New Democratic	Larry Duchesne	5,451	11.99	+6.28	$3,860.15
People's	William Archer	608	1.34	New	none listed
Independent	Matthew V. Rushton	232	0.51	New	none listed
Veterans Coalition	Jody O'Blenis	144	0.32	New	none listed
National Citizens Alliance	Stephen J. Garvey	109	0.24	New	none listed
Total valid votes/expense limit		45,450	99.03		$104,050.86
Total rejected ballots		447	0.97	+0.59	
Turnout		45,897	68.54	−2.51	
Eligible voters		66,967			
Liberal hold		Swing		−18.14	
Source: Elections Canada

Nova Scotia provincial by-election, June 19, 2018: Cumberland South Resignation of Jamie Baillie
Party	Candidate	Votes	%	±%	Expenditures
Progressive Conservative	Tory Rushton	3,417	59.19	+7.70	$22,387
Liberal	Scott Lockhart	1,829	31.68	-8.79	$32,332
New Democratic	Larry Duchesne	292	5.06	-0.74	$9,239
Green	Bruce McCulloch	235	4.07	—	$1,234
Total valid votes		5,773			
Total rejected ballots		17			
Turnout		5,773	53.02	-9.35	
Eligible voters		10,889			
Progressive Conservative hold		Swing		+8.24	
Source: Elections Nova Scotia

2017 Nova Scotia general election: Cumberland South
Party	Candidate	Votes	%	±%
Progressive Conservative	Jamie Baillie	3,536	51.49	+0.53
Liberal	Kenny John Jackson	2,779	40.47	+0.26
New Democratic	Larry Duchesne	398	5.80	-0.98
Atlantica	Thor Lengies	154	2.24	
Total valid votes		6,897	100.00	
Total rejected ballots		35	0.51	-0.19
Turnout		6,902	62.37	-3.36
Eligible voters		11,066		
Progressive Conservative hold		Swing		+0.14
Source: Elections Nova Scotia

2013 Nova Scotia general election
Party	Candidate	Votes	%	±%
Progressive Conservative	Jamie Baillie	3,655	51.0%	-6.2
Liberal	Kenny Jackson	2,884	40.2%	+2.2
New Democratic Party	Larry Duchesne	486	6.8%	+2.0
Green	Bruce McCulloch	147	2.0%	+2.0
Total valid votes		7,172	100.00	
Total rejected ballots		50	0.7	
Turnout		7,222	65.73	
Eligible voters		10,987		

1997 Canadian federal election: Cardigan
Party	Candidate	Votes	%	±%
Liberal	Lawrence MacAulay	7,555	45.05	-16.59
Progressive Conservative	Dan Hughes	7,456	44.46	+11.79
New Democratic	Larry Duchesne	1,761	10.50	+4.81
Total valid votes		16,772	100.00	

1996 Prince Edward Island general election
Party	Candidate	Votes	%
Progressive Conservative	Chester Gillan	1,584	57.37
Liberal	Stephen Dowling	1,008	36.51
New Democratic	Larry Duchesne	169	6.12
Total valid votes		2,761	100.0
This district was created from parts of the dual-member riding of 5th Queens.

1993 Prince Edward Island general election
Party	Candidate	Votes	%	±%
Liberal	Stavert Huestis	4,215	55.40	-3.57
Progressive Conservative	Fred McCardle	2,568	33.75	+0.44
New Democratic	Larry Duchesne	825	10.84	+2.94
Total valid votes		7,608	98.52	
Total rejected ballots		114	1.48	+0.17
Turnout		7,722	74.16	+1.39
Eligible voters		10,412		
Liberal hold		Swing		-2.01
Source: Elections Prince Edward Island

1989 Prince Edward Island general election
Party	Candidate	Votes	%	±%
Liberal	Stavert Huestis	4,343	58.98	+15.67
Progressive Conservative	Royce Green	2,453	33.31	-9.01
New Democratic	Larry Duchesne	582	7.90	-6.81
Total valid votes		7,378	98.69	
Total rejected ballots		98	1.31	+0.37
Turnout		7,476	72.77	-7.49
Eligible voters		10,273		
Liberal hold		Swing		+12.34
Source: Elections Prince Edward Island

1984 Nova Scotia general election: Pictou East
Party	Candidate	Votes	%	±%
Progressive Conservative	Donald Cameron	4,367	63.75%	2.87%
Liberal	Scott Johnston	1,754	25.61%	-0.07%
New Democratic	Larry Duchesne	729	10.64%	-2.80%
Total		6,850	–	
Source(s) Source: Nova Scotia Legislature (2021). "Electoral History for Pictou East" (PDF). nslegislature.ca. Nova Scotia. Chief Electoral Officer (1984). Returns of the General Election for the House of Assembly, Thirty-First General Election (PDF). Queen's Printer. Archived from the original (PDF) on 2024-11-11.

1978 Nova Scotia general election: Annapolis West
Party	Candidate	Votes	%	±%
Progressive Conservative	Greg Kerr	2,690	50.56%	7.34%
Liberal	Peter M. Nicholson	2,329	43.78%	-9.22%
New Democratic	Larry Duchesne	301	5.66%	1.88%
Total		5,320	–	
Source(s) Source: Nova Scotia Legislature (2021). "Electoral History for Annapolis" (PDF). nslegislature.ca. Nova Scotia. Chief Electoral Officer (1978). Returns of the General Election for the House of Assembly, Twenty-Ninth General Election (PDF). Queen's Printer. Archived from the original (PDF) on 2024-11-11.
