= Pictou East =

Provincial electoral district in Nova Scotia, Canada

Nova Scotia electoral district

Provincial electoral district
- Legislature: Nova Scotia House of Assembly
MLA
Tim Houston
Progressive Conservative
- District created: 1949
- First contested: 1949
- Last contested: 2024

Demographics
- Population (2011): 15,155
- Electors: 11,803
- Area (km²): 1,644
- Pop. density (per km²): 9.2
- Census division: Pictou County

Pictou East is a provincial electoral district in Nova Scotia, Canada, that elects one member of the Nova Scotia House of Assembly.

Its Member of the Legislative Assembly (MLA) since the 2013 election is Tim Houston of the Progressive Conservative Association of Nova Scotia who replaced Clarrie MacKinnon of the New Democratic Party of Nova Scotia.

== Geography ==
Pictou East covers 1,644 km^{2} (635 sq mi) of land area.

== Members of the Legislative Assembly ==
This riding has elected the following members of the Legislative Assembly:

Pictou East
Legislature	Years	Member	Party
44th	1949–1953	John W. MacDonald	Liberal
45th	1953–1956	John W. MacDonald	Liberal
46th	1956–1960	William A. MacLeod	Progressive Conservative
47th	1960–1963	John W. MacDonald	Liberal
48th	1963–1967	A. Lloyd MacDonald	Liberal
49th	1967–1970	Thomas MacQueen	Progressive Conservative
50th	1970–1974	A. Lloyd MacDonald	Liberal
51st	1974–1978	Donald Cameron	Progressive Conservative
52nd	1978–1981	Donald Cameron	Progressive Conservative
53rd	1981–1984	Donald Cameron	Progressive Conservative
54th	1984–1988	Donald Cameron	Progressive Conservative
55th	1988–1993	Donald Cameron	Progressive Conservative
56th	1993–1993	Donald Cameron	Progressive Conservative
56th	1993–1998	Wayne Fraser	Liberal
57th	1998–1999	James DeWolfe	Progressive Conservative
58th	1999–2003	James DeWolfe	Progressive Conservative
59th	2003–2006	James DeWolfe	Progressive Conservative
60th	2006–2009	Clarrie MacKinnon	New Democratic
61st	2009–2013	Clarrie MacKinnon	New Democratic
62nd	2013–2017	Tim Houston	Progressive Conservative
63rd	2017–2021	Tim Houston	Progressive Conservative
64th	2021–2024	Tim Houston	Progressive Conservative
65th	2024–present	Tim Houston	Progressive Conservative

== Election results ==
=== 2024 ===
2024 Nova Scotia general election
Party	Candidate	Votes	%	±%
Progressive Conservative	Tim Houston	4,424	78.89	+9.21
New Democratic	Vernon Theriault	656	11.70	+4.61
Liberal	Stephanie Quinn	528	9.42	-13.04
Total valid votes		5,608		
Total rejected ballots		39		
Turnout		5,647	46.40	
Eligible voters		12,170		
Progressive Conservative hold		Swing		
Source: Elections Nova Scotia

=== 2021 ===
2021 Nova Scotia general election
Party	Candidate	Votes	%	±%	Expenditures
Progressive Conservative	Tim Houston	4,918	69.68	-4.20	$36,667.66
Liberal	Joe MacDonald	1,585	22.46	+4.24	$24,555.29
New Democratic	Joy Polley	500	7.08	-0.82	$18,372.66
Atlantica	Jonathan Geoffrey Dean	55	0.78		$200.00
Total valid votes/expense limit		7,058	99.62	–	$70,149.96
Total rejected ballots		27	0.38		
Turnout		7,085	61.44		
Eligible voters		11,532			
Progressive Conservative hold		Swing		-4.22	
Source: Elections Nova Scotia

=== 2017 ===
2017 Nova Scotia general election
Party	Candidate	Votes	%	±%
Progressive Conservative	Tim Houston	5,275	73.88	+25.83
Liberal	John Fraser	1,301	18.22	+2.33
New Democratic	Deborah Stiles	564	7.90	-28.17
Total valid votes		7,140	100	
Total rejected ballots		34	0.47	
Turnout		7,174	59.9	
Eligible voters		11,976		
Progressive Conservative hold		Swing		+11.75
Source: Elections Nova Scotia

=== 2013 ===
2013 Nova Scotia general election
Party	Candidate	Votes	%	±%
Progressive Conservative	Tim Houston	3,714	48.05	22.11
New Democratic	Clarrie MacKinnon	2,788	36.07	-27.91
Liberal	François (Frank) M. Rochon	1,228	15.89	7.49
Total		7,730	–	
Source(s) Source: Nova Scotia Legislature (2024). "Electoral History for Pictou East" (PDF). nslegislature.ca. Nova Scotia, Chief Electoral Officer (2013). 39th Provincial General Election, October 8, 2013: Volume 1 – Statement of Votes & Statistics (PDF) (Report). Elections Nova Scotia. Archived from the original (PDF) on 10 April 2018.

=== 2009 ===
2009 Nova Scotia general election
Party	Candidate	Votes	%	±%
New Democratic	Clarrie MacKinnon	4,893	63.98	27.25
Progressive Conservative	J. Ed MacDonald	1,984	25.94	-9.37
Liberal	François (Frank) M. Rochon	642	8.39	-18.21
Green	Robbie Loftus White	129	1.69	0.33
Total		7,648	–	
Source(s) Source: Nova Scotia Legislature (2024). "Electoral History for Pictou East" (PDF). nslegislature.ca.

=== 2006 ===
2006 Nova Scotia general election
Party	Candidate	Votes	%	±%
New Democratic	Clarrie MacKinnon	2,761	36.73	10.88
Progressive Conservative	Sue Uhren	2,654	35.31	-8.84
Liberal	Danny Walsh	2,000	26.61	-3.39
Green	John A. Clark	102	1.36	–
Total		7,517	–	
Source(s) Source: Nova Scotia Legislature (2024). "Electoral History for Pictou East" (PDF). nslegislature.ca.

=== 2003 ===
2003 Nova Scotia general election
Party	Candidate	Votes	%	±%
Progressive Conservative	James DeWolfe	3,295	44.15	-10.79
Liberal	John Fraser	2,239	30.00	14.24
New Democratic	Bob Matheson	1,929	25.85	-3.45
Total		7,463	–	
Source(s) Source: Nova Scotia Legislature (2024). "Electoral History for Pictou East" (PDF). nslegislature.ca.

=== 1999 ===
1999 Nova Scotia general election
Party	Candidate	Votes	%	±%
Progressive Conservative	James DeWolfe	4,478	54.94	9.11
New Democratic	Andy Thompson	2,388	29.30	1.65
Liberal	Lynn MacDonald	1,285	15.76	-10.75
Total		8,151	–	
Source(s) Source: Nova Scotia Legislature (2024). "Electoral History for Pictou East" (PDF). nslegislature.ca. Nova Scotia, Chief Electoral Officer (1999). Returns of the General Election for the House of Assembly, Thirty-Fifth General Election (Report). Elections Nova Scotia.

=== 1998 ===
1998 Nova Scotia general election
Party	Candidate	Votes	%	±%
Progressive Conservative	James DeWolfe	3,816	45.83	–
New Democratic	David MacKenzie	2,302	27.65	–
Liberal	Wayne Fraser	2,208	26.52	–
Total		8,326	–	
Source(s) Source: Nova Scotia Legislature (2024). "Electoral History for Pictou East" (PDF). nslegislature.ca.

=== 1993 by-election ===
Nova Scotia provincial by-election, 1993-08-03
Party	Candidate	Votes	%	±%
Liberal	Wayne Fraser	4,417	59.60	20.14
Progressive Conservative	Mel MacLean	1,902	25.66	-21.38
New Democratic	Dave Peters	935	12.62	-0.88
Independent	Alexander James MacKenzie	111	1.50	–
Natural Law	Peter H. Cameron	46	0.62	–
Total		7,411	–	
Source(s) Source: Nova Scotia Legislature (2024). "Electoral History for Pictou East" (PDF). nslegislature.ca. Nova Scotia, Chief Electoral Officer (1993). Returns of the General Election for the House of Assembly, Thirty-Third General Election (PDF) (Report). Queen's Printer. Archived from the original (PDF) on 18 June 2018.

=== 1993 ===
1993 Nova Scotia general election
Party	Candidate	Votes	%	±%
Progressive Conservative	Donald Cameron	4,446	47.05	-2.80
Liberal	Wayne Fraser	3,729	39.46	-0.99
New Democratic	Dave Peters	1,275	13.49	3.79
Total		9,450	–	
Source(s) Source: Nova Scotia Legislature (2024). "Electoral History for Pictou East" (PDF). nslegislature.ca. Nova Scotia, Chief Electoral Officer (1993). Returns of the General Election for the House of Assembly, Thirty-Third General Election (PDF) (Report). Queen's Printer. Archived from the original (PDF) on 18 June 2018.

=== 1988 ===
1988 Nova Scotia general election
Party	Candidate	Votes	%	±%
Progressive Conservative	Donald Cameron	3,996	49.84	-13.91
Liberal	Wayne Fraser	3,243	40.45	14.85
New Democratic	Cecil MacNeil	778	9.70	-0.94
Total		8,017	–	
Source(s) Source: Nova Scotia Legislature (2024). "Electoral History for Pictou East" (PDF). nslegislature.ca. Nova Scotia, Chief Electoral Officer (1988). Returns of the General Election for the House of Assembly, Thirty-Second General Election (PDF) (Report). Queen's Printer. Archived from the original (PDF) on 7 July 2018.

=== 1984 ===
1984 Nova Scotia general election
Party	Candidate	Votes	%	±%
Progressive Conservative	Donald Cameron	4,367	63.75	2.87
Liberal	Scott Johnston	1,754	25.61	-0.07
New Democratic	Larry Duchesne	729	10.64	-2.80
Total		6,850	–	
Source(s) Source: Nova Scotia Legislature (2024). "Electoral History for Pictou East" (PDF). nslegislature.ca. Nova Scotia, Chief Electoral Officer (1984). Returns of the General Election for the House of Assembly, Thirty-First General Election (PDF) (Report). Queen's Printer. Archived from the original (PDF) on 31 July 2017.

=== 1981 ===
1981 Nova Scotia general election
Party	Candidate	Votes	%	±%
Progressive Conservative	Donald Cameron	4,347	60.88	1.92
Liberal	Harold Lowe	1,833	25.67	-6.63
New Democratic	Hasse Lindblad	960	13.45	4.71
Total		7,140	–	
Source(s) Source: Nova Scotia Legislature (2024). "Electoral History for Pictou East" (PDF). nslegislature.ca. Nova Scotia, Chief Electoral Officer (1981). Returns of the General Election for the House of Assembly, Thirtieth General Election (PDF) (Report). Queen's Printer. Archived from the original (PDF) on 31 July 2017.

=== 1978 ===
1978 Nova Scotia general election
Party	Candidate	Votes	%	±%
Progressive Conservative	Donald Cameron	4,315	58.96	12.99
Liberal	W. G. (Bill) Munro	2,364	32.30	-9.79
New Democratic	Bill Mitton	639	8.73	-3.20
Total		7,318	–	
Source(s) Source: Nova Scotia Legislature (2024). "Electoral History for Pictou East" (PDF). nslegislature.ca. Nova Scotia, Chief Electoral Officer (1978). Returns of the General Election for the House of Assembly, Twenty-Ninth General Election (PDF) (Report). Queen's Printer. Archived from the original (PDF) on 18 June 2018.

=== 1974 ===
1974 Nova Scotia general election
Party	Candidate	Votes	%	±%
Progressive Conservative	Donald Cameron	3,217	45.98	-1.20
Liberal	J. Lester MacLellan	2,945	42.09	-5.39
New Democratic	Joanne E. Kohout	835	11.93	6.58
Total		6,997	–	
Source(s) Source: Nova Scotia Legislature (2024). "Electoral History for Pictou East" (PDF). nslegislature.ca. Nova Scotia, Chief Electoral Officer (1974). Returns of the General Election for the House of Assembly, Twenty-Eighth General Election (PDF) (Report). Queen's Printer. Archived from the original (PDF) on 18 June 2018.

=== 1970 ===
1970 Nova Scotia general election
Party	Candidate	Votes	%	±%
Liberal	A. Lloyd MacDonald	3,000	47.48	-1.39
Progressive Conservative	Thomas MacQueen	2,981	47.18	-3.96
New Democratic	Charles E. Arbuckle	338	5.35	–
Total		6,319	–	
Source(s) Source: Nova Scotia Legislature (2024). "Electoral History for Pictou East" (PDF). nslegislature.ca. Nova Scotia, Legislative Assembly (1970). Returns of the General Election for the House of Assembly, 1970 (PDF) (Report). Queen's Printer. Archived from the original (PDF) on 25 July 2018.

=== 1967 ===
1967 Nova Scotia general election
Party	Candidate	Votes	%	±%
Progressive Conservative	Thomas MacQueen	2,876	51.14	1.24
Liberal	A. Lloyd MacDonald	2,748	48.86	-1.24
Total		5,624	–	
Source(s) Source: Nova Scotia Legislature (2024). "Electoral History for Pictou East" (PDF). nslegislature.ca. Nova Scotia Legislature (1967). Returns of the General Election for the House of Assembly (PDF) (Report). Queen's Printer. Archived from the original (PDF) on 25 July 2018.

=== 1963 ===
1963 Nova Scotia general election
Party	Candidate	Votes	%	±%
Liberal	A. Lloyd MacDonald	2,660	50.10	2.91
Progressive Conservative	John Andrew MacLean	2,649	49.90	5.35
Total		5,309	–	
Source(s) Source: Nova Scotia Legislature (2024). "Electoral History for Pictou East" (PDF). nslegislature.ca. Nova Scotia Legislature (1963). Returns of the General Election for the House of Assembly (PDF) (Report). Queen's Printer. Archived from the original (PDF) on 25 July 2018.

=== 1960 ===
1960 Nova Scotia general election
Party	Candidate	Votes	%	±%
Liberal	John W. MacDonald	2,568	47.20	-2.76
Progressive Conservative	William A. MacLeod	2,424	44.55	-5.49
Co-operative Commonwealth	Barrie M. Hould	449	8.25	–
Total		5,441	–	
Source(s) Source: Nova Scotia Legislature (2024). "Electoral History for Pictou East" (PDF). nslegislature.ca. Nova Scotia Legislature (1960). Returns of the General Election for the House of Assembly (PDF) (Report). Queen's Printer. Archived from the original (PDF) on 25 July 2018.

=== 1956 ===
1956 Nova Scotia general election
Party	Candidate	Votes	%	±%
Progressive Conservative	William A. MacLeod	2,754	50.05	2.88
Liberal	John W. MacDonald	2,749	49.95	1.17
Total		5,503	–	
Source(s) Source: Nova Scotia Legislature (2024). "Electoral History for Pictou East" (PDF). nslegislature.ca. Nova Scotia Legislature (1956). Returns of the General Election for the House of Assembly (PDF) (Report). Queen's Printer. Archived from the original (PDF) on 10 September 2018.

=== 1953 ===
1953 Nova Scotia general election
Party	Candidate	Votes	%	±%
Liberal	John W. MacDonald	2,681	48.78	2.23
Progressive Conservative	William A. MacLeod	2,592	47.16	5.14
Co-operative Commonwealth	Joseph D. Ryan	223	4.06	-7.38
Total		5,496	–	
Source(s) Source: Nova Scotia Legislature (2024). "Electoral History for Pictou East" (PDF). nslegislature.ca. Nova Scotia Legislature (1953). Returns of the General Election for the House of Assembly (PDF) (Report). Queen's Printer. Archived from the original (PDF) on 10 September 2018.

=== 1949 ===
1949 Nova Scotia general election
Party	Candidate	Votes	%	±%
Liberal	John W. MacDonald	2,455	46.55	–
Progressive Conservative	William A. MacLeod	2,216	42.02	–
Co-operative Commonwealth	Collie G. Ross	603	11.43	–
Total		5,274	–	
Source(s) Source: Nova Scotia Legislature (2024). "Electoral History for Pictou East" (PDF). nslegislature.ca. Nova Scotia Legislature (1949). Returns of the General Election for the House of Assembly (PDF) (Report). Queen's Printer. Archived from the original (PDF) on 10 September 2018.

== See also ==
- List of Nova Scotia provincial electoral districts
- Canadian provincial electoral districts

Nova Scotia House of Assembly
Preceded by Cumberland East	Constituency represented by the Premier; 1991–1993	Succeeded by Dartmouth South
Preceded by Timberlea-Prospect	Constituency represented by the Premier since 2021	Incumbent
