= Jim Smith (Nova Scotia politician) =

Canadian politician (1935–2020)

The Honourable Jim Smith ECNS

MLA for Dartmouth East
- In office 1984–2003
- Preceded by: Richard L. Weldon
- Succeeded by: Joan Massey

Minister of Health
- In office June 9, 1997 – August 16, 1999
- Preceded by: Bernie Boudreau
- Succeeded by: Jamie Muir

Personal details
- Born: James Alexander Smith; May 25, 1935 Liverpool, Nova Scotia, Canada
- Died: January 18, 2020 (aged 84) Halifax, Nova Scotia, Canada
- Party: Liberal
- Occupation: Doctor

James Alexander Smith (May 25, 1935 – January 18, 2020) was a Canadian politician. He represented the electoral district of Dartmouth East in the Nova Scotia House of Assembly from 1984 to 2003. He was a member of the Nova Scotia Liberal Party.

Smith was born in Liverpool, Nova Scotia in 1935, and grew up in Port Mouton. Smith graduated with a medical degree from Dalhousie University in 1964. He practiced family medicine in Dartmouth, Nova Scotia for almost 30 years. Smith first attempted to enter provincial politics in the 1981 election, but was defeated by Progressive Conservative incumbent Richard L. Weldon. Smith ran again in the 1984 election, defeating Weldon by 903 votes to win the Dartmouth East riding. One of only six Liberals elected, Smith spent the early years of his political career in opposition. He was re-elected in the 1988 election, winning the seat by 253 votes. Smith was re-elected in the 1993 election, defeating cabinet minister Gwen Haliburton by almost 2,500 votes. Following the election, Smith would get to sit in government for the first time, as the Liberals under John Savage won a majority government.

On June 11, 1993, Smith was appointed to the Executive Council of Nova Scotia as Minister of Community Services. On June 27, 1996, Savage shuffled his cabinet, with Smith being named Minister of Housing and Municipal Affairs. On June 6, 1997, Savage announced that Smith would take over as Minister of Health on June 9, when Bernie Boudreau resigns from cabinet to run for the Liberal leadership. Smith remained as Minister of Health when Russell MacLellan took over as premier on July 18, 1997. Smith was re-elected in the 1998 election, and retained the health portfolio, but was also named Minister of Justice. In December 1998, Smith was replaced as Minister of Justice, as MacLellan shuffled his cabinet to reduce the heavy workload of some of the cabinet. Smith was re-elelcted by 265 votes in the 1999 election, but the Liberals were defeated by John Hamm's Progressive Conservatives. Smith served in opposition for one term, announcing on May 2, 2003, that he would not seek re-election in the next election. Smith died on January 18, 2020.
