= Don Chard =

Canadian politician

MLA for Dartmouth South
- In office 1998–1999
- Preceded by: John Savage
- Succeeded by: Tim Olive

Personal details
- Party: New Democratic Party

Donald F. Chard is a former Canadian politician. He represented the electoral district of Dartmouth South in the Nova Scotia House of Assembly from 1998 to 1999. He was a member of the Nova Scotia New Democratic Party.

Chard was a member of the former Dartmouth district school board and a planner with Parks Canada who first ran for provincial politics in the 1993 election. He was defeated, but ran again in the 1998 election, winning the Dartmouth South seat for the NDP. In May 1998, he was elected Deputy Speaker of the House of Assembly. He was defeated by Progressive Conservative Tim Olive when he ran for re-election in the 1999 election. Chard made another attempt at the NDP nomination in 2003, but lost a coin toss to Marilyn More after the vote count ended in a tie. As of October 2019, Chard was still giving public lectures.
