= Progressive Conservative Association of Nova Scotia leadership elections =

The Progressive Conservative Association of Nova Scotia, Canada, has held leadership conventions or elections since World War I. The last was held in October, 2018.

== 1922 leadership convention ==
(Held June 29, 1922)

- William Lorimer Hall
- Howard Corning

(The vote totals were not released)

== 1925 leadership election ==
Edgar Nelson Rhodes was elected at a meeting of the party executive and nominated candidates on May 21, 1925.

== 1940 leadership convention ==
(Held October 9, 1940)

- Leonard William Fraser accl.

== 1948 leadership convention ==
Party President Robert Stanfield won this convention handily defeating C. Fred Fraser 246-76 on November 10, 1948. Stanfield would go on to become premier from 1956 to 1967. In 1967, he won the leadership of the Progressive Conservative Party of Canada and led that party for another nine years.

== 1967 leadership convention ==
With Stanfield's election as federal leader, the provincial leadership and premiership opened up. His long-time right-hand man, G.I. (Ike) Smith, ran for the leadership and was acclaimed on November 4, 1967.

== 1971 leadership convention ==
Three candidates, all in their thirties, ran for the leadership of the opposition Tories. Two former cabinet ministers, Gerry Doucet, the 33-year-old MLA for Richmond, and John Buchanan, the 39-year-old MLA for Halifax Atlantic were running against the 36-year-old mayor of Dartmouth, Rollie Thornhill.

(Held March 6, 1971)

=== First ballot ===
- Gerald Doucet 282
- John Buchanan 242
- Rollie Thornhill 212

=== Second ballot ===
Thornhill personally supported Buchanan, but "released" his delegates to support either candidate.

- John Buchanan 391
- Gerald Doucet 346

== 1991 leadership convention ==
After a couple of decades, including 12 years as premier, John Buchanan resigned the party leadership when he was summoned to the Senate.

Four candidates fought to succeed him as premier. Rollie Thornhill, from the 1971 race, would make a second run for the leadership, this time after sitting in the House as the MLA for Dartmouth South for 17 years. Caucus colleagues running were Donald Cameron, the MLA for Pictou East who entered the House when Thornhill did; and Tom McInnis, the 13-year MLA for Eastern Shore. Rounding out the field was Clair Callaghan, the principal of the Technical University of Nova Scotia (now part of Dalhousie University), and a candidate in the 1988 general election.

(Held February 9, 1991)

=== First ballot ===
- Donald Cameron 754
- Rollie Thornhill 736
- Tom McInnis 680
- Clair Callaghan 178

=== Second ballot ===
- Donald Cameron 801
- Rollie Thornhill 775
- Tom McInnis 762

=== Third ballot ===
- Donald Cameron 1,201
- Rollie Thornhill 1,058

== 1995 leadership convention ==
(Held October 28, 1995)

In a one member one vote telephone election, John Hamm was elected on the first ballot:

- John Hamm 1,594
- Jim White 1,107
- Michael L. MacDonald 284

== 2006 leadership convention ==
(Held February 11, 2006)

First Ballot:

- Rodney MacDonald 789
- Bill Black 742
- Neil LeBlanc 730

(Note: There were three spoiled ballots)

Second Ballot (LeBlanc eliminated, supports MacDonald):

- Rodney MacDonald 1,263
- Bill Black 855

(Note: There were 12 spoiled ballots)

== 2010 leadership convention ==
Jamie Baillie was acclaimed leader on October 30, 2010.

== 2018 leadership election ==
(Held October 27, 2018)

The election was conducted on a One Member One Vote basis, weighted so that each electoral district being allocated 100 points, which were distributed proportionally according to each candidate's level of support.

First ballot (points)

- Tim Houston 2,496.75 (48.95%)
- Cecil Clarke 1,385.71 (27.17%)
- John Lohr 692.45 (13.58%)
- Elizabeth Smith-McCrossin 384.96 (7.55%)
- Julie Chaisson 140.13 (2.75%)

(Chaisson eliminated. Clarke, Lohr, and Smith-McCrossin withdrew. Houston declared the winner.)
