= Dartmouth East =

Provincial electoral district in Nova Scotia, Canada

Nova Scotia electoral district

Provincial electoral district
- Legislature: Nova Scotia House of Assembly
MLA
Tim Halman
Progressive Conservative
- District created: 1978
- First contested: 1978
- Last contested: 2024

Demographics
- Population (2016): 23,264
- Electors: 13,788
- Area (km²): 21.00
- Pop. density (per km²): 1,107.8
- Census division: Halifax Regional Municipality

Dartmouth East is a provincial electoral district in Nova Scotia, Canada, that elects one member of the Nova Scotia House of Assembly. The riding is located in the community of Dartmouth, in the urban area of Halifax.

In 1978, the district was created to provide for an increase in representation of six members and in 2003, it lost a northern area to Waverley-Fall River and gained an area in Woodlawn. In 2013, following the recommendations of the Electoral Boundaries Commission report, it gained the Montebello area from Waverley-Fall River-Beaver Bank and lost the area east of Bell Lake to Cole Harbour-Portland Valley and lost the area north of Main Street and east of Caledonia Road until Geovex Court to Preston-Dartmouth.

== Geography ==
This riding is approximately 21 km^{2} (8.1 sq mi) in landmass.

== Members of the Legislative Assembly ==
This riding has elected the following members of the Legislative Assembly:

Dartmouth East
Legislature	Years	Member	Party
Riding created from Dartmouth North and Dartmouth South
52nd	1978–1981	Richard L. Weldon	Progressive Conservative
53rd	1981–1984	Richard L. Weldon	Progressive Conservative
54th	1984–1988	Jim Smith	Liberal
55th	1988–1993	Jim Smith	Liberal
56th	1993–1998	Jim Smith	Liberal
57th	1998–1999	Jim Smith	Liberal
58th	1999–2003	Jim Smith	Liberal
59th	2003–2006	Joan Massey	New Democratic
60th	2006–2009	Joan Massey	New Democratic
61st	2009–2013	Andrew Younger	Liberal
62nd	2013–2015	Andrew Younger	Liberal
62nd	2015–2017	Andrew Younger	Independent
63rd	2017–2021	Tim Halman	Progressive Conservative
64th	2021–2024	Tim Halman	Progressive Conservative
65th	2024–present	Tim Halman	Progressive Conservative

== Election results ==
=== 2024 ===
2024 Nova Scotia general election
Party	Candidate	Votes	%	±%	Expenditures
Progressive Conservative	Tim Halman	3,167	44.17	+5.18	$34,460.73
New Democratic	Holly Fraughton	2,235	31.17	+7.56	$30,764.13
Liberal	Stacy Chesnutt	1,768	24.66	-10.02	$45,556.13
Total valid votes		7,170			
Total rejected ballots		42			
Turnout		7,212	49.5%		
Eligible voters		14,577			
Progressive Conservative hold		Swing			
Source: Elections Nova Scotia

=== 2021 ===
2021 Nova Scotia general election
Party	Candidate	Votes	%	±%	Expenditures
Progressive Conservative	Tim Halman	3,260	38.99	-2.16	$37,157.69
Liberal	D'Arcy Poultney	2,900	34.68	-4.10	$38,011.92
New Democratic	Tyler J. Colbourne	1,974	23.61	+11.62	$27,154.74
Green	Sara Adams	187	2.24	-5.84	$500.82
Atlantica	Chris Bowie	41	0.49		$200.00
Total valid votes/expense limit		8,362	99.67	–	$85,132.57
Total rejected ballots		28	0.33		
Turnout		8,390	57.44		
Eligible voters		14,607			
Progressive Conservative hold		Swing		+0.97	
Source: Elections Nova Scotia

=== 2017 ===
2017 Nova Scotia general election
Party	Candidate	Votes	%	±%
Progressive Conservative	Tim Halman	3,309	41.15	+27.52
Liberal	Edgar Burns	3,118	38.78	-25.07
New Democratic	Bill McEwen	964	11.99	-10.53
Green	Matthew Richey	650	8.08	
Total valid votes		8,041	99.36	
Total rejected ballots		52	0.64	
Turnout		8,093	54.84	
Eligible voters		14,758		
Progressive Conservative gain from Liberal		Swing		+26.30
Source: Elections Nova Scotia

=== 2013 ===
2013 Nova Scotia general election
Party	Candidate	Votes	%	±%
Liberal	Andrew Younger	5,469	63.85%	18.43%
New Democratic	Deborah M. Stover	1,929	22.52%	-20.43%
Progressive Conservative	Mike E. MacDonell	1,167	13.63%	4.03%
Total		8,565	–	
Source(s) Source: Nova Scotia Legislature (2024). "Electoral History for Dartmouth East" (PDF). nslegislature.ca. Nova Scotia, Chief Electoral Officer (2013). 39th Provincial General Election, October 8, 2013: Volume 1 – Statement of Votes & Statistics (PDF) (Report). Elections Nova Scotia. Archived from the original (PDF) on 10 April 2018.

=== 2009 ===
2009 Nova Scotia general election
Party	Candidate	Votes	%	±%
Liberal	Andrew Younger	4,133	45.43%	24.58%
New Democratic	Joan Massey	3,908	42.95%	-0.31%
Progressive Conservative	Bert Thompson	873	9.60%	-23.70%
Green	Anna Mukpo	184	2.02%	-0.57%
Total		9,098	–	
Source(s) Source: Nova Scotia Legislature (2024). "Electoral History for Dartmouth East" (PDF). nslegislature.ca.

=== 2006 ===
2006 Nova Scotia general election
Party	Candidate	Votes	%	±%
New Democratic	Joan Massey	3,822	43.26%	6.61%
Progressive Conservative	Jim Cormier	2,942	33.30%	-1.51%
Liberal	Tracey Devereaux	1,842	20.85%	-5.15%
Green	Elizabeth Perry	229	2.59%	–
Total		8,835	–	
Source(s) Source: Nova Scotia Legislature (2024). "Electoral History for Dartmouth East" (PDF). nslegislature.ca.

=== 2003 ===
2003 Nova Scotia general election
Party	Candidate	Votes	%	±%
New Democratic	Joan Massey	3,272	36.65%	8.10%
Progressive Conservative	Terry Degen	3,107	34.80%	0.75%
Liberal	Debra Barlow	2,321	26.00%	-11.39%
Marijuana	Hugô St-Onge	101	1.13%	–
Nova Scotia Party	Scott Anderson	98	1.10%	–
Independent	Sebastien Theriault	28	0.31%	–
Total		8,927	–	
Source(s) Source: Nova Scotia Legislature (2024). "Electoral History for Dartmouth East" (PDF). nslegislature.ca.

=== 1999 ===
1999 Nova Scotia general election
Party	Candidate	Votes	%	±%
Liberal	Jim Smith	2,975	37.39%	-3.53%
Progressive Conservative	Terry Degen	2,710	34.06%	11.31%
New Democratic	Heather Henderson	2,272	28.55%	-7.79%
Total		7,957	–	
Source(s) Source: Nova Scotia Legislature (2024). "Electoral History for Dartmouth East" (PDF). nslegislature.ca. Nova Scotia, Chief Electoral Officer (1999). Returns of the General Election for the House of Assembly, Thirty-Fifth General Election (Report). Elections Nova Scotia.

=== 1998 ===
1998 Nova Scotia general election
Party	Candidate	Votes	%	±%
Liberal	Jim Smith	3,326	40.92%	-14.62%
New Democratic	Viola Huntington	2,954	36.34%	19.34%
Progressive Conservative	Ralph Hawley	1,849	22.75%	-4.72%
Total		8,129	–	
Source(s) Source: Nova Scotia Legislature (2024). "Electoral History for Dartmouth East" (PDF). nslegislature.ca.

=== 1993 ===
1993 Nova Scotia general election
Party	Candidate	Votes	%	±%
Liberal	Jim Smith	4,912	55.53%	12.56%
Progressive Conservative	Gwen Haliburton	2,429	27.46%	-13.42%
New Democratic	Owen Hertzman	1,504	17.00%	0.87%
Total		8,845	–	
Source(s) Source: Nova Scotia Legislature (2024). "Electoral History for Dartmouth East" (PDF). nslegislature.ca. Nova Scotia, Chief Electoral Officer (1993). Returns of the General Election for the House of Assembly, Thirty-Third General Election (PDF) (Report). Queen's Printer. Archived from the original (PDF) on 18 June 2018.

=== 1988 ===
1988 Nova Scotia general election
Party	Candidate	Votes	%	±%
Liberal	Jim Smith	5,193	42.98%	-0.72%
Progressive Conservative	Jack Greenough	4,940	40.88%	7.04%
New Democratic	Maureen Vine	1,950	16.14%	-6.32%
Total		12,083	–	
Source(s) Source: Nova Scotia Legislature (2024). "Electoral History for Dartmouth East" (PDF). nslegislature.ca. Nova Scotia, Chief Electoral Officer (1988). Returns of the General Election for the House of Assembly, Thirty-Second General Election (PDF) (Report). Queen's Printer. Archived from the original (PDF) on 7 July 2018.

=== 1984 ===
1984 Nova Scotia general election
Party	Candidate	Votes	%	±%
Liberal	Jim Smith	4,004	43.70%	10.20%
Progressive Conservative	Richard L. Weldon	3,101	33.84%	-8.67%
New Democratic	Gerald Legere	2,058	22.46%	-1.53%
Total		9,163	–	
Source(s) Source: Nova Scotia Legislature (2024). "Electoral History for Dartmouth East" (PDF). nslegislature.ca. Nova Scotia, Chief Electoral Officer (1984). Returns of the General Election for the House of Assembly, Thirty-First General Election (PDF) (Report). Queen's Printer. Archived from the original (PDF) on 31 July 2017.

=== 1981 ===
1981 Nova Scotia general election
Party	Candidate	Votes	%	±%
Progressive Conservative	Richard L. Weldon	4,253	42.51%	-10.50%
Liberal	Jim Smith	3,351	33.50%	-2.78%
New Democratic	Gerald Legere	2,400	23.99%	13.28%
Total		10,004	–	
Source(s) Source: Nova Scotia Legislature (2024). "Electoral History for Dartmouth East" (PDF). nslegislature.ca. Nova Scotia, Chief Electoral Officer (1981). Returns of the General Election for the House of Assembly, Thirtieth General Election (PDF) (Report). Queen's Printer. Archived from the original (PDF) on 31 July 2017.

=== 1978 ===
1978 Nova Scotia general election
Party	Candidate	Votes	%	±%
Progressive Conservative	Richard L. Weldon	5,098	53.02%	–
Liberal	Barbara Hart	3,488	36.27%	–
New Democratic	Gabriel DesRochers	1,030	10.71%	–
Total		9,616	–	
Source(s) Source: Nova Scotia Legislature (2024). "Electoral History for Dartmouth East" (PDF). nslegislature.ca. Nova Scotia, Chief Electoral Officer (1978). Returns of the General Election for the House of Assembly, Twenty-Ninth General Election (PDF) (Report). Queen's Printer. Archived from the original (PDF) on 18 June 2018.

== See also ==
- List of Nova Scotia provincial electoral districts
- Canadian provincial electoral districts
