= John W. MacDonald =

Canadian politician

MLA for Pictou East
- In office 1960–1963
- Preceded by: William A. MacLeod
- Succeeded by: A. Lloyd MacDonald
- In office 1949–1956
- Preceded by: new riding
- Succeeded by: William A. MacLeod

Personal details
- Born: October 8, 1900 Avondale, Nova Scotia
- Died: May 13, 1983 (aged 82) New Glasgow, Nova Scotia
- Party: Liberal
- Occupation: lumber dealer

John William MacDonald (October 8, 1900 – May 13, 1983) was a Canadian politician. He represented the electoral district of Pictou East in the Nova Scotia House of Assembly from 1949 to 1956, and 1960 to 1963. He was a member of the Nova Scotia Liberal Party.

Born in 1900 at Avondale, Pictou County, Nova Scotia, MacDonald was a lumber dealer by career. He married Jean Evans in 1930. He entered provincial politics in the 1949 election, winning the Pictou East riding. He was re-elected in the 1953 election. In the 1956 election, MacDonald was defeated by 5 votes, losing to Progressive Conservative William A. MacLeod. In the 1960 election, MacDonald regained the seat from MacLeod by 144 votes. He did not re-offer in the 1963 election. MacDonald died in New Glasgow on May 13, 1983.
