= Andrew Younger =

Canadian politician

The Honourable Andrew Younger ECNS
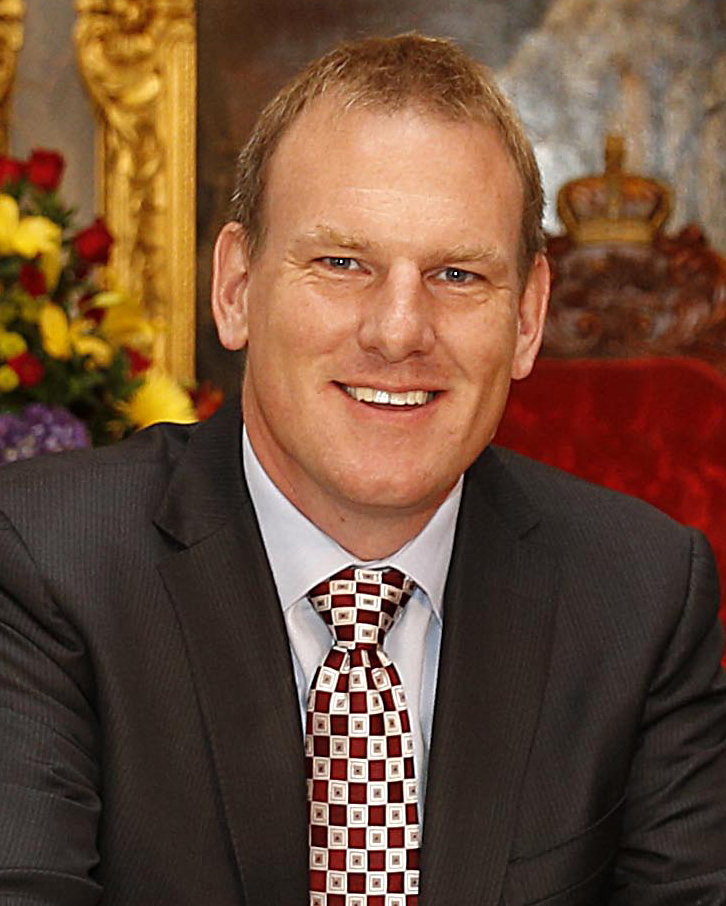

Member of the Nova Scotia House of Assembly for Dartmouth East
- In office June 9, 2009 – May 30, 2017
- Preceded by: Joan Massey
- Succeeded by: Tim Halman

Personal details
- Born: Dartmouth, Nova Scotia
- Party: Independent (2015–2017)
- Other political affiliations: Liberal (2009–2015)

Andrew Younger is a Canadian politician and journalist, first elected to the Nova Scotia House of Assembly in the 2009. He represented the district of Dartmouth East first as a member of the Nova Scotia Liberal Party and subsequently as an independent. In 2015, Younger was removed from cabinet and the Liberal caucus after invoking parliamentary privilege in order to avoid giving testimony at a criminal trial.

== Early life and career ==
Younger was born in Oakville, Ontario and grew up in Dartmouth, Nova Scotia.

He holds a Bachelor of Science in Marine Biology and Political Science from Dalhousie University, and a Bachelor of Journalism from the University of King's College.

Younger worked for CBC Television in Halifax and Charlottetown. He then ran a television production, corporate social responsibility, and communications consulting company prior to entering politics. He dedicated a significant portion of his work to social justice and environmental projects and assisted with development projects in West Africa including a women's micro-credit project in Niger and an AIDS education project in the Gambia.

In 2000 Younger won a Silver Atlantic Journalism Award in the category of Jim McNeil New Journalist. He also was part of a production team which won a Canadian Gemini Award in the category of Best Information/Talk Programming and international Gabriel Award.

== Municipal politics ==
Younger was first elected to the legislature in 2009 after a five-year tenure on Halifax Regional Council. He was first elected to council in 2004 representing East Dartmouth - The Lakes, and was re-elected by acclamation in 2008.

During his time as an elected representative, Younger was recognized for his community and regional accomplishments including the development of a redevelopment plan for the Main Street business district in Dartmouth, his work improving Shubie Park and the Shubenacadie Canal system, and his role in the construction of the Dartmouth Community Centre.

Younger has been involved in working on energy and environmental issues in Nova Scotia. As Chair of HRM's Energy Committee he was a player in the development and analysis of energy policy, and had a role in seeing a number of district, geothermal, and alternative energy projects moved forward. He is often asked to speak on energy and environmental issues at local and national conferences.

== Provincial politics ==
On October 22, 2013, Younger was appointed to the Executive Council of Nova Scotia as Minister of Energy, Minister Responsible for the Gaming Control Act, and Minister for Communications Nova Scotia.

On March 25, 2015, Younger resigned from cabinet but remained MLA for Dartmouth East.

Younger returned to cabinet on July 24, 2015, when he was named Minister of Environment.

On November 5, 2015, Younger was removed from his cabinet position and the Liberal caucus, after he invoked parliamentary privilege in order to unilaterally excuse himself from attending as a witness at the criminal trial of a woman accused of assaulting him. Premier Stephen McNeil called the privilege an "obscure law that he [Younger] and his lawyer determined to use."

After becoming an independent, Younger's private health information was leaked by the Premier's office. An independent report by the Nova Scotia Privacy Commissioner found that the Premier's office failed in its duty of care to protect health information and found staff in the office had not read policies meant to protect information.

In 2016 Younger was voted the Silver Winner in the "Best Member of the Legislature" category for The Coast's Best Of awards.

Younger chose to return to the private sector and not re-offer in the 2017 provincial election.

=== Electoral record ===
2013 Nova Scotia general election
Party	Candidate	Votes	%	±%
Liberal	Andrew Younger	5,469	63.85	
New Democratic Party	Deborah M. Stover	1,929	22.52	
Progressive Conservative	Mike M. MacDonnell	1,167	13.63	

2009 Nova Scotia general election
Party	Candidate	Votes	%	±%
Liberal	Andrew Younger	4073	45.09	+24.26
New Democratic Party	Joan Massey	3903	43.21	-0.01
Progressive Conservative	Bert Thompson	873	9.66	-23.61
Green	Anna Mukpo	184	2.04	-0.65
