= Marian Mancini =

Canadian politician

Member of the Nova Scotia House of Assembly for Dartmouth South
- In office July 14, 2015 – April 23, 2017
- Preceded by: Allan Rowe
- Succeeded by: Claudia Chender

Personal details
- Party: New Democrat
- Spouse: Peter Mancini

Marian Borden Mancini is a Canadian politician, who was elected to the Nova Scotia House of Assembly in a by-election on July 14, 2015. She represented the district of Dartmouth South as a member of the Nova Scotia New Democratic Party.

Prior to her election to the legislature, she worked as a legal aid lawyer. She is married to Peter Mancini, a former federal Member of Parliament.

On November 10, 2016, Mancini announced that she would not re-offer in the next election.

On April 23, 2017, Mancini resigned from the Nova Scotia House of Assembly.

== Election record ==
Nova Scotia provincial by-election, July 14, 2015 On the death of Allan Rowe
Party	Candidate	Votes	%	±%
New Democratic	Marian Mancini	2,274	35.25	+1.93
Liberal	Tim Rissesco	2,193	33.99	-12.24
Progressive Conservative	Gord Gamble	1,494	23.16	+4.75
Independent	Charlene M. Gagnon	490	7.60	
Total valid votes		6,541	99.66	
Total rejected ballots		22	0.34	
Turnout		6,473	38.21	
Electors on the lists		17,940	–	
New Democratic gain from Liberal		Swing		+7.09
