= William A. MacLeod =

Canadian politician

MLA for Pictou East
- In office 1956–1960
- Preceded by: John W. MacDonald
- Succeeded by: John W. MacDonald

Personal details
- Born: October 31, 1883 Lansdowne, Nova Scotia
- Died: April 12, 1961 (aged 77) New Glasgow, Nova Scotia
- Party: Progressive Conservative
- Occupation: physician

William Arthur MacLeod (October 31, 1883 – April 12, 1961) was physician and a Canadian politician. He represented the electoral district of Pictou East in the Nova Scotia House of Assembly from 1956 to 1960. He was a member of the Progressive Conservative Party of Nova Scotia.

Born in 1883 at Lansdowne, Nova Scotia, MacLeod was a physician by career. He graduated from Dalhousie University in 1908, and married Alice Maude McClary in 1912. MacLeod first attempted to enter provincial politics in the 1949 election, but was defeated by Liberal John W. MacDonald. He ran again in the 1953 election, but lost to MacDonald by 89 votes. In the 1956 election, MacLeod defeated MacDonald by 5 votes to win the Pictou East riding. In the 1960 election, MacDonald defeated MacLeod by 144 votes to regain the seat. MacLeod died in New Glasgow, Nova Scotia on April 12, 1961.
