= Tim Houston =

Premier of Nova Scotia since 2021

The Honourable Tim Houston ECNS MLA FCPA
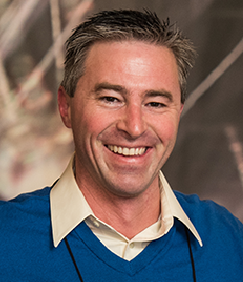
- Houston in 2016

30th Premier of Nova Scotia
- Incumbent
- Assumed office August 31, 2021
- Monarchs: Elizabeth II; Charles III
- Lieutenant Governor: Arthur LeBlanc; Mike Savage
- Deputy: Allan MacMaster; Tim Halman; Barbara Adams
- Preceded by: Iain Rankin

Leader of the Progressive Conservative Association of Nova Scotia
- Incumbent
- Assumed office October 27, 2018
- Preceded by: Karla MacFarlane (interim)

Member of the Nova Scotia House of Assembly for Pictou East
- Incumbent
- Assumed office October 8, 2013
- Preceded by: Clarrie MacKinnon

Chair of the Council of the Federation
- In office July 12, 2023 – August 1, 2024
- Preceded by: Heather Stefanson
- Succeeded by: Doug Ford

Leader of the Opposition in Nova Scotia
- In office October 27, 2018 – August 31, 2021
- Preceded by: Karla MacFarlane
- Succeeded by: Iain Rankin

Personal details
- Born: Timothy Jerome Houston; April 10, 1970 (age 56) Halifax, Nova Scotia, Canada
- Party: Progressive Conservative
- Spouse: Carol Houston
- Children: 2
- Education: Saint Mary's University (BCom)
- Occupation: Politician; accountant
- Website: www.timhouston.ca

Timothy Jerome Houston (Note: Pronounced /ˈhjuːstən/ HEW-stən.) (born April 10, 1970) is a Canadian politician who has served as the 30th premier of Nova Scotia since 2021, and leader of the Progressive Conservative Party (PC) since 2017. He was first elected to the Nova Scotia House of Assembly in the 2013 provincial election, and represents the electoral district of Pictou East. He was the leader of the opposition from 2018 to 2021.

Houston and the PC party won a majority government in the 2021 Nova Scotia general election, making him the first PC premier since 2009. He called a snap election in 2024, increasing his party's majority. He also began to appoint himself to positions in his own cabinet, appointing himself the new minister of energy in 2026.

== Early life and education ==
Tim Houston was born in Halifax, Nova Scotia, and grew up in a military family on bases across Canada. He attended Halifax West High School.

Houston attended Saint Mary's University, where he earned a Bachelor of Commerce. He went on to receive his Chartered Accountant designation in Halifax, before moving to Bermuda where he worked with Deloitte in the insurance industry. In 2017, it came to light that Houston's name had been mentioned several times in the Paradise Papers, due to him having held positions as director and vice-president of Inter-Ocean Holdings and several related Bermuda-based reinsurance companies while living and working in Bermuda.

On November 2, 2020, Houston was awarded the accounting profession's highest mark of distinction, the Fellow (FCPA) designation, by the Chartered Professional Accountants of Nova Scotia.

== Political career ==
On November 27, 2012, Houston won the Progressive Conservative nomination in the riding of Pictou East for the 2013 Nova Scotia general election.

Houston was elected MLA of Pictou East on October 8, 2013, with 48.05% of the vote. He was re-elected on May 30, 2017 with 73.9% of the vote.

On November 19, 2017, Houston announced his candidacy for the leadership of the Progressive Conservative Party of Nova Scotia. Houston was elected leader of the Progressive Conservative Party after the first ballot results were announced on October 27, 2018, at the party's leadership convention in Halifax. He earned 48.96% of the points on the first ballot, leaving other candidates no clear path to victory. The other candidates conceded after the first ballot.

Houston has been publicly open to the option of fracking in Nova Scotia. During his time as finance critic in 2016, Houston criticized the Liberal government of the time for not permitting fracking, stating "You can't hold industry and people hostage to your own political wills. You have to, kind of, explain to people what you're doing and why you're doing it". In 2025, Houston's majority government put forward legislation to lift the moratorium on fracking for onshore gas, as well as the ban on uranium exploration and mining.

Houston has been critical of the Conservative Party of Canada's 2025 federal election campaign.

=== 2021 provincial election ===
The incumbent Liberals held a 75% approval rating in June 2021. In an upset, Houston and the Progressive Conservatives won a majority government in the 2021 Nova Scotia general election, becoming the first Progressive Conservative premier since 2009. Houston ran on a Red Tory platform that promised more spending on health care.

=== 2024 provincial election ===
Houston's Progressive Conservatives won a supermajority in the 2024 election, with the New Democratic Party (NDP) forming the Official Opposition.

== Premier of Nova Scotia (2021–present) ==
Houston and his cabinet were sworn in on August 31, 2021.

=== Healthcare system ===
One day after being sworn in, Houston fired the CEO and board of the Nova Scotia Health Authority (NSHA), the provincial healthcare provider. He stated that he "needed a clean slate at the helm of his leadership team" for the Progressive Conservatives' intended overhaul of the healthcare system. Houston appointed a new NSHA board as well as a new CEO, Karen Oldfield, who possessed no prior healthcare experience.

The Houston government lifted Nova Scotia's COVID-19 measures in March 2022, including public health restrictions and mask requirements. Infectious disease experts questioned the move and predicted a rise in cases. In May 2022, the government lifted mask requirements in public schools. In July 2022, the government ended the requirement for those infected with COVID-19 to isolate. The number of cases (and associated deaths) increased thereafter, which some experts attributed to the government's lifting of pandemic precautions.

=== Natural resource development ===
In early 2025, Houston issued a memo to his caucus outlining his version for economic development in the province, with a focus on natural resource development. This was followed by months later with legislation to lift a ban on hydraulic fracturing and uranium mining in Nova Scotia.

Houston debuted "Wind West" in response to Prime Minister Mark Carney’s commitment to make Canada an "energy superpower". The project would see enough turbines to generate 40 gigawatts of electricity erected offshore Nova Scotia.

Houston reshuffled his Cabinet in October 2025, appointing himself as minister of energy.

=== Property laws ===
The Houston government increased the annual cap on rent increases from two percent to five percent. They have been criticized by the Nova Scotia NDP for failing to close what is termed the 'fixed-term lease loophole' which allows landlords to get around rent cap limitations by simply evicting tenants at the end of a fixed-term lease and renting to new tenants. In 2026, Houston insisted it was critical to the province that they eliminate funding to heritage museums focusing on minority heritage in order to maintain his budget priorities, including business tax cuts for those in larger centres.

=== Crown corporations ===
Shortly after taking office, Houston launched a review of 20 provincial Crown corporations to "[ensure] the most efficient and accountable methodology for the undertaking of their respective tasks".

In July 2022, the Houston government announced a reshuffle of several agencies. Nova Scotia Lands and Develop Nova Scotia would be merged to form a new corporation called Build Nova Scotia. Innovacorp, Nova Scotia Business Inc. (NSBI), and the Invest Nova Scotia Fund would be merged into the new Invest Nova Scotia. Decision-making power was removed from boards, with the organizations placed under direct government control: Invest Nova Scotia would now report directly to the minister of economic development, while Build Nova Scotia would be overseen by the minister for public works. Existing CEOs and boards were terminated from their positions.

Opposition leaders accused Houston of nepotism after appointing "personal friends" as interim CEOs of the two new agencies; Tom Hickey would lead Invest Nova Scotia, while Wayne Crawley would head Build Nova Scotia. Each will receive up to $18,000 a month in remuneration. Nova Scotia NDP leader Claudia Chender criticized Houston for hiring friends rather than putting the posts to open competition. Houston defended the appointments, stating that Hickey and Crawley were the most qualified. Hickey resigned two weeks into his appointment, citing an inability to commit enough time to the role.

The Nova Scotia Provincial Housing Agency was established during Houston's premiership to administer the province's public housing, amalgamating several existing housing authorities. In addition, the Joint Regional Transportation Agency was created "for the purpose of creating a master transportation plan" for the metropolitan Halifax region.

In 2022, the provincial government announced that Owls Head, a 266-hectare piece of land on the Eastern Shore, would be designated a provincial park. A controversial golf course development had previously been planned for the site. Houston had written of the proposal in 2021, "I will never allow this type of situation to happen under my watch and certainly wouldn't instigate it like [former premier Iain Rankin] did."

In a similar case, public concern had emerged over a proposed golf course conceived by a private developer, to be located at West Mabou Beach Provincial Park in Cape Breton. In late 2022, Houston said that the proposal would get due process and be subject to public consultation. In April 2023, the government informed the developer it would not consider the proposal as there is no mechanism within the Provincial Parks Act to allow it to proceed.

In December 2023, the province announced 23 new or expanded protected areas, protecting around 14,000 additional hectares of land. In 2026 he then decided to eliminated the wildlife division and other departments of the government, to open up land to corporate development instead of conservation.

=== Art gallery ===
Houston announced in July 2022 an indefinite "pause" to plans to construct a new Art Gallery of Nova Scotia. Construction had been slated to begin in late 2022 on a new gallery complex on the Halifax waterfront, designed by Halifax architect Omar Gandhi. After Houston's cancellation of the project, the site remains a parking lot along the waterfront unavailable for development.

=== Nova Scotia Guard ===
On 28 March 2024, Houston personally put forward legislation in the Nova Scotia House of Assembly to establish a new Department of Emergency Management and the Nova Scotia Guard. The act passed the legislature and received royal assent on 20 September 2024, following amendments made to allow for the creation of regional emergency operations centres within the province.

=== 2025 wildfires ===
During the 2025 Nova Scotia wildfires, citing extreme fire risk, the province instituted a ban on hiking, camping, fishing, and using vehicles such as all-terrain vehicles on all provincial Crown lands on August 5, which was set to last until October 15 or weather conditions improve. Similar bans were imposed in 2001, 2006, and 2023, and the Department of Natural Resources stated that since almost all wildfires in the province are from human activity, the ban was justified. The government faced some pushback on the ban as too onerous, or being overly punitive rather than addressing the problems of climate change. To challenge the ban in court, a former candidate for the People's Party of Canada recorded himself deliberately violating it by hiking in a forest in Cape Breton, and receiving a $28,872.50 fine.

=== Auditor General ===
In 2025, Premier Houston's government brought forward legislation that would have given itself the power to fire the auditor general without cause and make reports from the office private. Nova Scotia's Auditor General Kim Adair responded saying that she could no longer do her work as the legislature's fiscal watchdog if the Houston government gave itself the ability to fire her. David Johnson, a professor of political science at Cape Breton University said that the bill was "An example of enormous and unwarranted executive overreach [...] It smacks of a control-mania." After the proposed changes to the Auditor General Act were roundly criticized by the public and the opposition, they were ultimately withdrawn.

=== Budget cuts ===
In 2026 protests involving several thousand workers in the arts took to the streets in order to protest Houston's slashing of the province's budget lines allocated to the arts in the province - with the leadership of institutions like Neptune Theatre, the Directors Guild of Canada, and other organizations present. Houston's resistance to the opposition to his cuts in the arts increased the numbers in the protest crowds.

=== Civil service cuts ===
As part of the 2026 budget cuts, Houston is overseeing significant cuts to the civil service. In 2025-26, the deficit was $1.6-billion, leading the government to start reductions to the civil service by five percent each year for the next four fiscal years as well as the broader public sector by three percent during the same time.

The increased deficit was due to several prior factors: spending on health care, fighting wildfires during summer 2025, and tax breaks—adding up to $64.4-million more than the September budget update.

Health care spending included the conversion of long-term care facility mortgage loans into fixed capital assets, recommended by the auditor general, resulting in $3-billion additional debt; several tax cuts resulted in $477.6-million in lost revenues after reductions to the HST, Small Business Tax, and changes to the Basic Personal Amount.

== Personal life ==
Houston lives in Pictou County with his wife Carol, and children Paget and Zachary.

Houston had a cameo role in the 2023 Hallmark film The Secret Gift of Christmas, which was filmed in Nova Scotia. He also appeared in Sullivan's Crossing, season 3.

== Electoral record ==
2024 Nova Scotia general election: Pictou East
Party	Candidate	Votes	%	±%
Progressive Conservative	Tim Houston	4,424	78.89	+9.21
New Democratic	Vernon Theriault	656	11.70	+4.61
Liberal	Stephanie Quinn	528	9.42	-13.04
Total valid votes		5,608		
Total rejected ballots		39		
Turnout		5,647	46.40	
Eligible voters		12,170		
Progressive Conservative hold		Swing		
Source: Elections Nova Scotia

2021 Nova Scotia general election
Party	Candidate	Votes	%	±%
Progressive Conservative	Tim Houston	4,918	69.68	-4.20
Liberal	Joe MacDonald	1,585	22.46	+4.24
New Democratic	Joy Polley	500	7.08	-0.82
Atlantica	Jonathan Geoffrey Dean	55	0.78	
Total valid votes		7,058	99.62	
Total rejected ballots		27	0.38	
Turnout		7,085	61.44	
Eligible voters		11,532		
Progressive Conservative hold		Swing		-4.22

2017 Nova Scotia general election
Party	Candidate	Votes	%	±%
Progressive Conservative	Tim Houston	5,275	73.88	+25.83
Liberal	John Fraser	1,301	18.22	+2.33
New Democratic Party	Deborah Stiles	564	7.90	-28.17

2013 Nova Scotia general election
Party	Candidate	Votes	%	±%
Progressive Conservative	Tim Houston	3,713	48.04	+22.11
New Democratic Party	Clarrie MacKinnon	2,788	36.07	-27.91
Liberal	Francois Rochon	1,228	15.89	+7.50

== See also ==
- List of premiers of Nova Scotia

== Notes ==
Order of precedence
Preceded by Paul St-Pierre Plamondon as Premier of Quebec	Order of Precedence of Canada as Premier of Nova Scotia	Succeeded by Susan Holt as Premier of New Brunswick
