= Tim Halman =

Canadian politician

The Honourable Tim Halman ECNS MLA
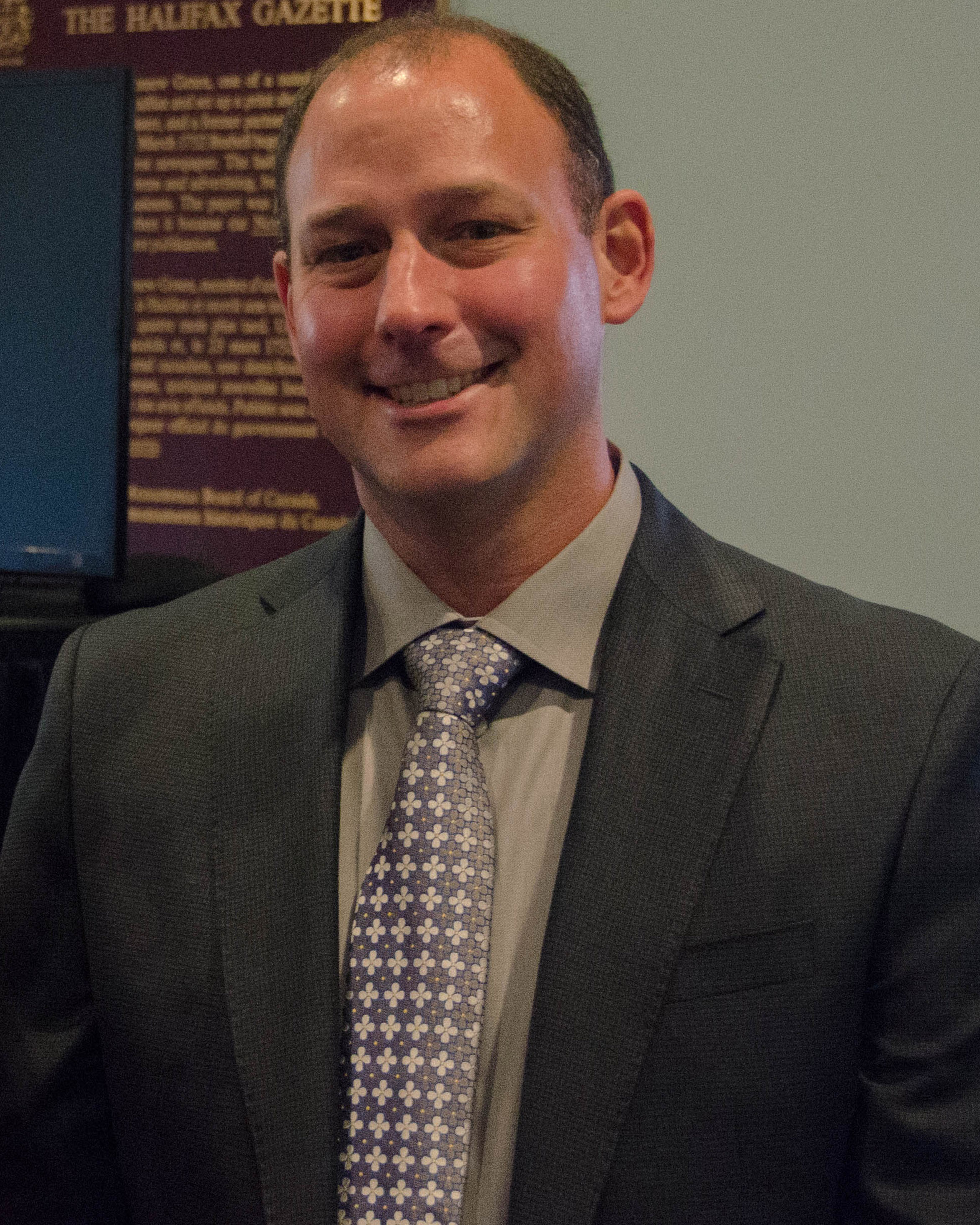

Deputy Premier of Nova Scotia
- In office October 24, 2024 – December 12, 2024
- Premier: Tim Houston
- Preceded by: Allan MacMaster
- Succeeded by: Barbara Adams

Minister of environment of Nova Scotia
- Incumbent
- Assumed office August 21, 2021
- Premier: Tim Houston

Member of the Nova Scotia House of Assembly for Dartmouth East
- Incumbent
- Assumed office May 30, 2017
- Preceded by: Andrew Younger

Personal details
- Born: June 2, 1977 (age 49) Montreal, Quebec, Canada
- Party: Progressive Conservative
- Education: Mount Saint Vincent University (BEd, MEd)
- Occupation: Teacher

Timothy Halman (born June 2, 1977) is a Canadian politician who was elected to the Nova Scotia House of Assembly in the 2017 provincial election. A member of the Progressive Conservative Association of Nova Scotia, he represents the electoral district of Dartmouth East. While in opposition, Halman was the PC critic for Education and Early Childhood Development.

== Career ==
Born in Montreal, Quebec, Halman spent most of his youth in Dartmouth, Nova Scotia. He later moved back to Quebec with his family as his father worked in the film industry. He studied at Concordia University before settling in Dartmouth where he pursued his Bachelor's and a master's degree in Education at Mount Saint Vincent University.

Prior to his election to the House of Assembly, Halman was a teacher for Prince Andrew High School.

With the support of his late wife, Ginette Thibault-Halman, he decided to leave the classroom to run as a candidate for the 2017 Nova Scotia general election.

On August 31, 2021, Halman was made Minister of Environment and Climate Change as well as Chair of Treasury Board and Policy Board.

== Electoral record ==
2024 Nova Scotia general election: Dartmouth East
Party	Candidate	Votes	%	±%	Expenditures
Progressive Conservative	Tim Halman	3,167	44.17	+5.18	$34,460.73
New Democratic	Holly Fraughton	2,235	31.17	+7.56	$30,764.13
Liberal	Stacy Chesnutt	1,768	24.66	-10.02	$45,556.13
Total valid votes		7,170			
Total rejected ballots		42			
Turnout		7,212	49.5%		
Eligible voters		14,577			
Progressive Conservative hold		Swing			
Source: Elections Nova Scotia

2021 Nova Scotia general election: Dartmouth East
Party	Candidate	Votes	%	±%	Expenditures
Progressive Conservative	Tim Halman	3,260	38.99	-2.16	$37,157.69
Liberal	D'Arcy Poultney	2,900	34.68	-4.10	$38,011.92
New Democratic	Tyler J. Colbourne	1,974	23.61	+11.62	$27,154.74
Green	Sara Adams	187	2.24	-5.84	$500.82
Atlantica	Chris Bowie	41	0.49		$200.00
Total valid votes/expense limit		8,362	99.67	–	$85,132.57
Total rejected ballots		28	0.33		
Turnout		8,390	57.44		
Eligible voters		14,607			
Progressive Conservative hold		Swing		+0.97	
Source: Elections Nova Scotia

2017 Nova Scotia general election: Dartmouth East
Party	Candidate	Votes	%	±%
Progressive Conservative	Tim Halman	3,309	41.15	+27.52
Liberal	Edgar Burns	3,118	38.78	-25.07
New Democratic	Bill McEwen	964	11.99	-10.53
Green	Matthew Richey	650	8.08	
Total valid votes		8,041	99.36	
Total rejected ballots		52	0.64	
Turnout		8,093	54.84	
Eligible voters		14,758		
Progressive Conservative gain from Liberal		Swing		+26.30
Source: Elections Nova Scotia
