= Roland J. Thornhill =

Canadian politician (1935–2026)

The Honourable Roland J. Thornhill ECNS

MLA for Dartmouth South
- In office 1974–1993
- Preceded by: D. Scott MacNutt
- Succeeded by: John Savage

Personal details
- Born: Roland John Thornhill; September 3, 1935 Grand Bank, Dominion of Newfoundland
- Died: July 16, 2026 (aged 90) Baddeck, Nova Scotia, Canada
- Party: Progressive Conservative
- Relatives: Rob Steele (Nephew)
- Occupation: Stockbroker, consultant, politician

Roland John Thornhill (September 3, 1935 – July 16, 2026) was a Canadian politician. He represented the electoral district of Dartmouth South in the Nova Scotia House of Assembly from 1974 to 1993. He was a member of the Progressive Conservative Party.

== Background ==
Roland John Thornhill was born in Grand Bank, Dominion of Newfoundland on September 3, 1935, the third child of Captain Arch and Ruth (Williams) Thornhill. He was educated in Newfoundland at Prince of Wales College and Memorial University, St. John’s, and later in Nova Scotia at Dalhousie University, Halifax. During his freshman year at Dalhousie he was elected Class president and freshman of the year, and was active in the Dalhousie Glee and Dramatic Society, Dalhousie University Mock Parliament and was a member of the fraternity Phi Kappa Pi. Before entereing politics, he worked at Eastern Securities and later for the National firm Richardson Securities once it acquired the former. From 1967 to 1973, he served as mayor of Dartmouth, Nova Scotia. In 1955, he married Joyce Marie Moore.

Thornhill died in Baddeck, Nova Scotia on July 16, 2026, at the age of 90.

== Political career ==
On February 3, 1971, while serving as mayor of Dartmouth, Thornhill announced his candidacy for the leadership of the Progressive Conservative Party of Nova Scotia. At the leadership convention, Thornhill was eliminated on the first ballot, finishing third behind Gerald Doucet and John Buchanan. Thornhill threw his support to Buchanan, who overtook Doucet on the second ballot to win the leadership.

Thornhill ran in the 1974 election, and defeated Liberal cabinet minister D. Scott MacNutt by 620 votes in the Dartmouth South riding. He was re-elected in the 1978 election. On October 5, 1978, Thornhill was appointed to the Executive Council of Nova Scotia as Minister of Development, Chair of the Treasury Board, and Deputy Premier. In June 1979, Premier John Buchanan restructured most government departments, which included Thornhill giving up the Chair of the Treasury Board.

In March 1980, it became public knowledge that in 1977 and 1978, Thornhill, who had personal financial problems negotiated with four banks for forgiveness of a series of loans he had made years earlier, some of this occurring while he was serving as Chair of the Treasury Board. This resulted in an RCMP investigation into the forgiving of 75 percent of Thornhill's loans totaling about $140,000. The investigation exonerated Thornhill, when a report on the matter in October 1980 said there was no evidence to lay charges. Thornhill was re-elected in the 1981 election, and remained as Minister of Development when Buchanan shuffled his cabinet in December 1981. Thornhill was re-elected in the 1984 election, and remained Minister of Development until November 25, 1987, when he became Minister of the Environment and Minister of Industry, Trade and Technology.

Thornhill's bank dealings of a decade earlier resurfaced in 1988. On April 9, the Toronto Star reported that in 1980, the RCMP officers in charge of the investigation had enough evidence to press charges against Thornhill but were stopped by senior officials and the Nova Scotia Attorney General's office who publicly exonerated him. On April 12, Thornhill resigned from cabinet over the allegations, but remained as MLA. He was re-elected in the 1988 election, and returned to cabinet in December 1988, as Minister of Tourism. The investigation into Thornhill's bank dealings was reopened by the RCMP on February 16, 1990.

In September 1990, Buchanan resigned as premier, and a leadership convention was scheduled for February 1991. On November 14, 1990, Thornhill announced that he would seek the party leadership. At the convention, Thornhill was defeated on the third ballot by Donald Cameron. Less than two weeks later, on February 21, RCMP charged Thornhill with 17 fraud-related charges in relation to his bank dealings. The charges included four counts of receiving a benefit, seven counts of forgery and six counts of false pretenses. He immediately resigned from cabinet, and on February 25, quit the Progressive Conservative caucus to sit as an independent. On November 15, 1991, Thronhill received a discharge on 13 of the fraud-related charges, and the remaining charges were dismissed in December. He rejoined the Progressive Conservative caucus and was appointed to cabinet as Minister of Community Services. Thornhill did not seek re-election in the 1993 election.
