= Clarrie MacKinnon =

Canadian politician

Member of the Nova Scotia House of Assembly for Pictou East
- In office June 13, 2006 – October 8, 2013
- Preceded by: Jim DeWolfe
- Succeeded by: Tim Houston

Personal details
- Born: 1945 or 1946 (age 79–80)
- Party: NDP

Clarence "Clarrie" MacKinnon is a former Canadian politician, who represented the constituency of Pictou East in the Nova Scotia House of Assembly from 2006 to 2013. He was a member of the Nova Scotia New Democratic Party.

MacKinnon has a Bachelor of Arts in political science from Mount Saint Vincent University, and a Master of Marine Management from Dalhousie University. He has started part-time work on a PhD from the University of Cardiff in Wales, UK in Earth, Oceans and Planetary Science. MacKinnon has been employed in news media, public relations, and in the fishing industry. He has been a roughneck, worked on a woods crew and sold shoes and mobile homes.

The 2006 provincial election was MacKinnon's first successful run for provincial office. In a very close race, he won the seat with 36.73% of the vote, defeating his nearest opponent by 107 votes.

Prior to June 2009, MacKinnon was the New Democratic Caucus' critic for Economic Development.
