= Joan Massey =

Canadian politician

MLA for Dartmouth East
- In office August 5, 2003 – June 9, 2009
- Preceded by: Jim Smith
- Succeeded by: Andrew Younger

Personal details
- Born: 1958 or 1959 Dartmouth, Nova Scotia
- Party: NDP

Joan Massey (born 1958 or 1959) is a Canadian politician, who was a member of the Nova Scotia House of Assembly representing the riding of Dartmouth East for the Nova Scotia New Democratic Party from 2003 to 2009.

Born in Dartmouth, Nova Scotia, Massey was educated at Dartmouth High School and the Nova Scotia Community College, Akerley Campus. She worked as an administrative assistant and office manager, and serves as vice president of a family owned and operated company. From 1997 to 2000, Massey was an elected member of the Halifax Regional School Board.

Massey entered provincial politics in the 2003 election, winning the Dartmouth East riding by 165 votes. She was re-elected by 880 votes in the 2006 election. In the 2009 election, Massey was defeated by Liberal candidate Andrew Younger, a Halifax Regional Councillor.
