= Develop Nova Scotia =

Nova Scotian corporation

- Company type: Crown corporation
- Founded: 1976; 49 years ago
- Defunct: 1 December 2022
- Fate: Superseded by Build Nova Scotia
- Headquarters: Halifax, Nova Scotia, Canada
- Area served: Nova Scotia
- Website: developns.ca

Develop Nova Scotia Limited was a Crown corporation of Nova Scotia, Canada responsible for the implementation and administration of strategic infrastructure and property projects.

Founded in 1976 as the Waterfront Development Corporation Limited, it was originally tasked with revitalising post-industrial waterfront land in Halifax and Dartmouth. In 2001, WDCL absorbed another provincial corporation, the Bedford Waterfront Development Corporation.

The corporation was renamed Develop Nova Scotia in July 2018 when its mandate was expanded to encompass strategic economic infrastructure and property projects across the province. The provincial government subsequently introduced legislation to formalise the changes. The Develop Nova Scotia Act was passed in September 2018 and received royal assent in October 2018.

Shortly after being elected premier in 2021, Tim Houston launched a review of provincial Crown corporations. This led to the establishment of a new agency, Build Nova Scotia, into which Nova Scotia Lands Inc. and Develop Nova Scotia were amalgamated. The Build Nova Scotia Act, which repeals the Develop Nova Scotia Act, came into effect on 1 December 2022.

== See also ==
- Halifax Boardwalk
