= Wayne Fraser =

Canadian politician

MLA for Pictou East
- In office 1993–1998
- Preceded by: Donald Cameron
- Succeeded by: Jim DeWolfe

Personal details
- Born: 1956 (age 69–70)
- Party: Liberal
- Occupation: Stockbroker

Wayne Fraser is a Canadian politician. He represented the electoral district of Pictou East in the Nova Scotia House of Assembly from 1993 to 1998. He was a member of the Nova Scotia Liberal Party.

Fraser first attempted to enter politics in the 1988 provincial election, losing the Pictou East race to Progressive Conservative Donald Cameron. He again challenged Cameron in the 1993 election, but was defeated by a margin of more than 700 votes. At the time of the 1993 election, Cameron had been serving as the province's premier and, following his party's defeat, also resigned as MLA. A by-election was held on August 3, 1993, and Fraser was elected in his third attempt to win the seat. In the 1998 election, Fraser was defeated in his re-election bid by Progressive Conservative candidate Jim DeWolfe.
