= Allan Rowe (politician) =

Canadian politician and news anchor

MLA for Dartmouth South
- In office October 8, 2013 – March 16, 2015
- Preceded by: Marilyn More
- Succeeded by: Marian Mancini

Personal details
- Born: October 16, 1956 Hamilton, Ontario, Canada
- Died: March 16, 2015 (aged 58) Halifax, Nova Scotia, Canada
- Party: Liberal
- Spouse: Yvonne

Allan Rowe (October 16, 1956 – March 16, 2015) was a Canadian politician, who was elected to the Nova Scotia House of Assembly in the 2013 provincial election. A member of the Nova Scotia Liberal Party, he represented the electoral district of Dartmouth South.

== Personal life ==
Rowe was born in Hamilton, Ontario. He attended McMaster University and, later Memorial University. Rowe lived most of his adult life on the East Coast, following his professional career.

He was admitted to hospital in late February 2015, after suffering an aneurysm while shovelling. He died on March 16, 2015, at the age of 58, leaving his seat in the legislature vacant.

== Career ==
Prior to his election to the legislature, Rowe was a longtime television news anchor on CJON-DT, CJCH-TV, ASN and CIHF-TV.

=== Politics ===
In 2013, Rowe ran in the Nova Scotia general election for the Liberal Party of Nova Scotia in the riding of Dartmouth South. He won the election and was elected to legislature and served as the government caucus whip. Following Rowe's death, his duties as whip were reassigned to Brendan Maguire.

== Electoral record ==
2013 Nova Scotia general election - Dartmouth South
Party	Candidate	Votes	%	±%
Liberal	Allan Rowe	4,049	46.24	+18.34
New Democratic Party	Mary Vingoe	2,918	33.32	-22.24
Progressive Conservative	Gord Gamble	1,612	18.41	+5.16
Independent	Jim Murray	178	2.03	
