= Tory Rushton =

Canadian politician

The Honourable Tory Rushton ECNS MLA

Member of the Nova Scotia House of Assembly for Cumberland South
- Incumbent
- Assumed office June 19, 2018
- Preceded by: Jamie Baillie

Personal details
- Born: Tory George Rushton; July 10, 1979 (age 46)
- Party: Progressive Conservative

Tory George Rushton (born July 10, 1979) is a Canadian politician who was elected to the Nova Scotia House of Assembly in a byelection on June 19, 2018. A member of the Progressive Conservatives, he represents the electoral district of Cumberland South.

On August 31, 2021, Rushton was made the first Minister of Natural Resources and Renewables.

== Electoral record ==
2024 Nova Scotia general election: Cumberland South
Party	Candidate	Votes	%	±%
Progressive Conservative	Tory Rushton	3,442	77.21	8.74
Liberal	Liam D. MacDonald	540	12.11	-7.06
New Democratic	Larry Duchesne	476	10.68	1.48
Total		4,458	–	
Total rejected ballots		37		
Turnout		4,496	38.07	
Eligible voters		11,810		
Progressive Conservative hold		Swing		
Source: Elections Nova Scotia

2021 Nova Scotia general election: Cumberland South
Party	Candidate	Votes	%	±%	Expenditures
Progressive Conservative	Tory Rushton	3,900	68.47	+9.28	$29,144.30
Liberal	Rollie Lawless	1,092	19.17	-12.51	$22,771.07
New Democratic	Larry Duchesne	524	9.20	+4.14	$1,495.12
Green	Nicholas Hendren	180	3.16	-0.91	$200.00
Total valid votes/expense limit		5,696	99.46	–	$66,923.01
Total rejected ballots		31	0.54		
Turnout		5,727	52.12		
Eligible voters		10,989			
Progressive Conservative hold		Swing		+10.90	
Source: Elections Nova Scotia
