= Murray Scott =

Canadian politician

The Honourable Murray Scott ECNS

Speaker of the Nova Scotia House of Assembly
- In office August 20, 1999 – June 29, 2006
- Preceded by: Ron Russell
- Succeeded by: Cecil Clarke

Member of the Nova Scotia House of Assembly for Cumberland South
- In office March 24, 1998 – September 8, 2010
- Preceded by: Guy Brown
- Succeeded by: Jamie Baillie

Minister of Justice and Attorney General of Nova Scotia and Provincial Secretary of Nova Scotia
- In office February 24, 2006 – October 23, 2007
- Preceded by: Michael Gilbert Baker
- Succeeded by: Cecil Clarke

Personal details
- Party: Progressive Conservative

Murray K. Scott is a politician in Nova Scotia, Canada. He represented the electoral district of Cumberland South in the Nova Scotia House of Assembly from 1998 to 2010. He served as a member of the Progressive Conservative Party.

== Education ==
Scott attended Atlantic Police Academy and Université de Moncton.

== Employment ==
He served 20 years as police officer with the Moncton and Springhill municipal forces, received Governor General's Award for bravery while a police officer, in addition to a 20-year police exemplary service medal, and was president and a provincial director of Local 203, Police Association of Nova Scotia.

== Political career ==
Scott was first elected to the Nova Scotia House of Assembly in the 1998 election. He was re-elected in the 1999, 2003, 2006 and 2009 elections. He was elected Speaker of the House of Assembly of Nova Scotia in August 1999, and served in that role until being appointed to cabinet in February 2006. As a member of the Executive Council of Nova Scotia, Scott served as Attorney General and Minister of Justice, Minister of Transportation and Infrastructure Renewal, and Minister of Economic and Rural Development. Along with his cabinet duties, he was also the minister responsible for the Human Rights Act, the Regulations Act, Part II of the Workers' Compensation Act, Military Relations, and Nova Scotia Business Incorporated.

On August 10, 2010, Scott announced that he would retire from politics by the end of 2010. He officially resigned as the MLA for Cumberland South on September 8, 2010, clearing the way for party leader Jamie Baillie to run in a byelection.

== Community involvement ==
Served as a member of the citizens' advisory committee of the Springhill Institution; Co-ordinator of the local association of Crime Stoppers; Also past president of the Springhill Minor Hockey Association; Past vice-president of the Springhill Basketball Association, Past member of Springhill Industrial Commission; Previous Master of the Masonic Lodge; and past financial secretary for the Springhill United Baptist Church.
