= Jamie Baillie =

Canadian politician

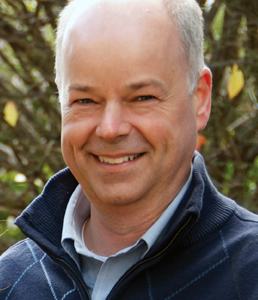

Leader of the Opposition in Nova Scotia
- In office October 22, 2013 – January 24, 2018
- Preceded by: Stephen McNeil
- Succeeded by: Karla MacFarlane

Leader of the Progressive Conservative Party of Nova Scotia
- In office August 18, 2010 – January 24, 2018
- Preceded by: Karen Casey
- Succeeded by: Karla MacFarlane

Member of the Nova Scotia House of Assembly for Cumberland South
- In office October 26, 2010 – January 24, 2018
- Preceded by: Murray Scott
- Succeeded by: Tory Rushton

Personal details
- Born: James Russell Baillie; April 28, 1966 (age 60) Truro, Nova Scotia
- Party: Progressive Conservative
- Spouse: Sandra Crowell
- Children: 2
- Education: Dalhousie University (BCom)

Jamie Baillie (born April 28, 1966) is a former Canadian politician. He served as leader of the Progressive Conservative Party of Nova Scotia from 2010 to 2018, and was the Leader of the Opposition from 2013 until January 2018, when he resigned and returned to the private sector. At the same time, he resigned as MLA for Cumberland South, the riding he had represented in the House of Assembly since 2010.

Prior to entering politics, he was a chartered accountant and the head of Credit Union Atlantic.

== Early life and career ==
Raised in Truro, Nova Scotia, he graduated from Cobequid Educational Centre in 1984. Baillie has been involved with the Progressive Conservative Party for over 25 years. While earning his commerce degree at Dalhousie University, Baillie became involved in the Nova Scotia PC Youth and served as president of the Dalhousie Young PCs and president of the Nova Scotia Young Progressive Conservatives. He also served as a cabinet minister in the Nova Scotia Youth Parliament, and an M.P. in the Youth Parliament of Canada. He went on to earn his Chartered Accountant designation, graduated from the Canadian Securities Institute and completed the High Potential Leadership Program at Harvard Business School.

In 2002, Premier John Hamm called upon Baillie to serve as his chief of staff. Baillie acted as a principal advisor to Hamm and played a key role on a number of initiatives, including improvements to public education and the preparation and presentation of balanced budgets.

In 2008 and 2009, he was the co-chair of the United Way of Halifax Region campaign. The campaign aimed to raise $6 million but surpassed that goal.

He has also served as Chair of the Board for Neptune Theatre and is a director of the Halifax International Airport Authority. He was also a member of the Board of Governors at Dalhousie University and of the Junior Achievement Nova Scotia Business Hall of Fame and is a Past President of Prescott Group, a sheltered workshop for intellectually challenged adults.

Baillie has also worked as a senior partner with Robertson Surrette, a human resources consulting firm, and was the vice president of Finance for CitiGroup Properties.

== Political career ==
On June 7, 2010, Baillie announced his candidacy for leadership of the Progressive Conservative Party of Nova Scotia. He launched his campaign by pledging a return to accountability, conservative principles and a new direction for the party and the province. Baillie brings a fiscally conservative approach to politics, including a promise to get a handle on the growing debt, return to mandatory balanced budgets and reduce the growth of a burgeoning civil service.

In his campaign launch, Baillie touted ideas to combat population decline that included immigration targets to bring Nova Scotia's population to one million people and an income tax exemption for graduates under 30 years old. He also emphasized that stronger regional collaboration is needed among Atlantic Provinces on energy generation and transmission.

When nominations closed on August 16, 2010, Baillie was the only candidate to enter the race and won the leadership uncontested. He was named interim leader on August 18, and officially took over as leader when ratified by party members at a convention in October 2010.

On September 8, 2010, Baillie announced his intention to run in a byelection for the constituency of Cumberland South, left vacant by retiring Progressive Conservative member Murray Scott.

On October 26, 2010, Baillie won the byelection to represent Cumberland South in the Nova Scotia House of Assembly.

In the 2013 election, Baillie led the Progressive Conservatives to second place, winning 11 seats and becoming Leader of the Opposition. He also won personal re-election in the Cumberland South riding. Baillie's 2013 campaign was managed by Janet Fryday-Dorey chaired by Halifax-based lawyer, Tara Erskine.

In the 2017 election, Baillie's Progressive Conservatives won 17 seats, retaining Official Opposition status, as the Liberals won a second consecutive majority government. Baillie was again re-elected in Cumberland South. The 2017 PC campaign was managed by Chad Bowie.

On January 24, 2018, Baillie's resignation as Party Leader was requested by Nova Scotia's Progressive Conservative Party following a third-party investigation into allegations of sexual harassment and other inappropriate behaviour by Baillie. After submitting his resignation, Baillie returned to the private sector. The incident has been a catalyst for the discussion of the use and abuse of NDAs within Nova Scotia.

== Personal life and honours ==
Baillie is married to Sandra Crowell. They have two daughters. He is currently a Senior Strategy Associate with Samuel Associates.

He was named one of Atlantic Canada's top 50 CEOs for five years running. He is a member of Atlantic Business Magazine’s Hall of Fame and in 2010 he was named a Fellow Chartered Accountant, the highest designation for that profession.

== See also ==
- Progressive Conservative Party of Nova Scotia
- Progressive Conservative Party of Nova Scotia leadership elections
- Progressive Conservative Party of Nova Scotia leadership election, 2006

== Electoral record ==
=== 2017 general election ===
2017 Nova Scotia general election: Cumberland South
| Party | Candidate | Votes | % | ±% |
|---|---|---|---|---|
| Progressive Conservative | Jamie Baillie | 3,536 | 51.49 | +0.53 |
| Liberal | Kenny John Jackson | 2,779 | 40.47 | +0.26 |
| New Democratic | Larry Duchesne | 398 | 5.80 | -0.98 |
| Atlantica | Thor Lengies | 154 | 2.24 | |
| Total valid votes | | 6,897 | 100.00 | |
| Total rejected ballots | | 35 | 0.51 | -0.19 |
| Turnout | | 6,902 | 63.20 | -2.53 |
| Eligible voters | | 10,921 | | |
| Progressive Conservative hold | | Swing | | +0.14 |

2013 Nova Scotia general election: Cumberland South
| Party | Candidate | Votes | % | ±% |
|---|---|---|---|---|
| Progressive Conservative | Jamie Baillie | 3,653 | 50.9% | -6.30 |
| Liberal | Kenny Jackson | 2,417 | 33.7% | -4.26 |
| New Democratic Party | Larry Duchesne | 872 | 12.2% | +7.36 |
| Green | Bruce McCulloch | 228 | 3.2% | - |

October 26, 2010 Cumberland South by-election
| Party | Candidate | Votes | % | ±% |
|---|---|---|---|---|
| Progressive Conservative | Jamie Baillie | 3,262 | 57.20% | -10.26 |
| Liberal | Kenny Jackson | 2,165 | 37.96% | +32.89 |
| New Democratic Party | Scott McKee | 276 | 4.84% | -21.06 |
