= Thomas MacQueen (politician) =

Canadian politician

MLA for Pictou East
- In office 1967–1970
- Preceded by: A. Lloyd MacDonald
- Succeeded by: A. Lloyd MacDonald

Personal details
- Born: 1910 Kings Head, Nova Scotia
- Died: April 9, 2003 (aged 92) New Glasgow, Nova Scotia
- Party: Progressive Conservative
- Occupation: farmer, fisherman

Thomas MacQueen (1910 – April 9, 2003) was a Canadian politician. He represented the electoral district of Pictou East in the Nova Scotia House of Assembly from 1967 to 1970. He was a member of the Progressive Conservative Party of Nova Scotia.

Born in 1910 at Kings Head, Nova Scotia, MacQueen was a farmer and fisherman. He entered provincial politics in the 1967 election, defeating Liberal incumbent A. Lloyd MacDonald by 128 votes in the Pictou East riding. MacQueen was defeated by MacDonald when he ran for re-election in 1970, losing the seat by 19 votes. In 1972, MacQueen was appointed manager of the Pictou County Home for Disabled. He died in New Glasgow on April 9, 2003.
