= Tim Olive =

Canadian politician

The Honourable Tim Olive ECNS

MLA for Dartmouth South
- In office 1999–2003
- Preceded by: Don Chard
- Succeeded by: riding dissolved

Personal details
- Born: 19 December 1946 (age 79) London, England, UK
- Party: Progressive Conservative
- Occupation: Businessman

Timothy A. Olive (born 19 December 1946) is a Canadian politician. He represented the electoral district of Dartmouth South in the Nova Scotia House of Assembly from 1999 to 2003. He was a member of the Progressive Conservative Party of Nova Scotia.

Born in 1946 at London, England, Olive is a businessman in Dartmouth, Nova Scotia. Olive was nominated as the Progressive Conservative candidate for Dartmouth South in the 1999 election. On 27 July 1999, Olive was elected MLA, defeating New Democrat incumbent Don Chard by 645 votes. On 18 August 1999, Olive was named chair of the government's caucus.

On 17 June 2002, Olive was appointed to the Executive Council of Nova Scotia as Minister of Natural Resources and Minister responsible for the Emergency Measures Act. Olive was defeated by New Democrat Marilyn More when he ran for re-election in 2003, losing by more than 1,000 votes in the new riding of Dartmouth South-Portland Valley. Olive ran again in the 2006 election, but was again defeated by More.

Prior to June 2012, Olive served as the Executive Director of the Downtown Dartmouth Business Commission.
