= James DeWolfe =

Canadian politician

MLA for Pictou East
- In office 1998–2006
- Preceded by: Wayne Fraser
- Succeeded by: Clarrie MacKinnon

Personal details
- Born: May 14, 1949 (age 76) New Glasgow, Nova Scotia
- Party: Progressive Conservative
- Relations: DeWolf family

James "Jim" DeWolfe (born May 14, 1949) is a former political figure in Nova Scotia, Canada. He represented Pictou East in the Nova Scotia House of Assembly from 1998 to 2006 as a Progressive Conservative.

DeWolfe was born in 1949 in New Glasgow, Nova Scotia, the son of William Elliott DeWolfe and Hazel Macdonald. He was educated at St. Francis Xavier University and the Technical University of Nova Scotia. In 1968, he married Diane Breen. He was employed by the Bank of Nova Scotia from 1967 to 1968 and then worked as a cartographer with the Nova Scotia Department of Natural Resources for 29 years.

DeWolfe entered provincial politics in the 1998 election, defeating Liberal incumbent Wayne Fraser by more than 1500 votes in the Pictou East riding. He was re-elected in the 1999, and 2003 elections. On May 1, 2006, DeWolfe announced he was leaving politics and would not reoffer in the 2006 election.
