= 56th Nova Scotia general election =

The 56th Nova Scotia general election may refer to

- the 1993 Nova Scotia general election, the 55th overall general election for Nova Scotia, for the (due to a counting error in 1859) 56th General Assembly of Nova Scotia, or
- the 1998 Nova Scotia general election, the 56th overall general election for Nova Scotia, for the 57th General Assembly of Nova Scotia, but considered the 34th general election for the Canadian province of Nova Scotia.
