= Cumberland South =

Provincial electoral district in Nova Scotia, Canada

Nova Scotia electoral district

Provincial electoral district
- Legislature: Nova Scotia House of Assembly
MLA
Tory Rushton
Progressive Conservative
- District created: 1993
- First contested: 1993
- Last contested: 2024

Demographics
- Population (2011): 13,202
- Electors (2018): 10,889
- Area (km²): 3,263
- Pop. density (per km²): 4
- Census division: Cumberland County
- Census subdivision(s): Cumberland, Subd. A, Cumberland Subd. B, Cumberland Subd. C, Cumberland Subd. D, Oxford, Parrsboro (dissolved in 2016)

Cumberland South is a provincial electoral district in Cumberland County, Nova Scotia, Canada, that elects one member of the Nova Scotia House of Assembly. The riding was created before the 1993 election from most of Cumberland West and Cumberland Centre ridings and a small part of Cumberland East.

The communities of Oxford, Parrsboro and Springhill are within its boundaries.

The Member of the Legislative Assembly since 1998 has been held by the Progressive Conservative Party of Nova Scotia. A Tory stronghold, Cumberland South has been dominated by Progressive Conservative Murray Scott for over a decade and now Tory Rushton

The 2012 redistribution saw the riding gain territory from Cumberland North.

== Geography ==
The land area of Cumberland South is 3,263 km^{2} (1,260 sq mi).

== Members of the Legislative Assembly ==
This riding has elected the following members of the Legislative Assembly:

Cumberland South
Legislature	Years	Member	Party
Riding created from Cumberland Centre, Cumberland North and Cumberland West
56th	1993–1998	Guy Brown	Liberal
57th	1998–1999	Murray Scott	Progressive Conservative
58th	1999–2003	Murray Scott	Progressive Conservative
59th	2003–2005	Murray Scott	Progressive Conservative
60th	2006–2009	Murray Scott	Progressive Conservative
61st	2009–2010	Murray Scott	Progressive Conservative
61st	2010–2013	Jamie Baillie	Progressive Conservative
62nd	2013–2017	Jamie Baillie	Progressive Conservative
63rd	2017–2018	Jamie Baillie	Progressive Conservative
63rd	2018–2021	Tory Rushton	Progressive Conservative
64th	2021–2024	Tory Rushton	Progressive Conservative
65th	2024–present	Tory Rushton	Progressive Conservative

== Election results ==
=== 2024 ===
2024 Nova Scotia general election
Party	Candidate	Votes	%	±%
Progressive Conservative	Tory Rushton	3,442	77.21	8.74
Liberal	Liam D. MacDonald	540	12.11	-7.06
New Democratic	Larry Duchesne	476	10.68	1.48
Total		4,458	–	
Total rejected ballots		37		
Turnout		4,496	38.07	
Eligible voters		11,810		
Progressive Conservative hold		Swing		
Source: Elections Nova Scotia

=== 2021 ===
2021 Nova Scotia general election
Party	Candidate	Votes	%	±%	Expenditures
Progressive Conservative	Tory Rushton	3,900	68.47	+9.28	$29,144.30
Liberal	Rollie Lawless	1,092	19.17	-12.51	$22,771.07
New Democratic	Larry Duchesne	524	9.20	+4.14	$1,495.12
Green	Nicholas Hendren	180	3.16	-0.91	$200.00
Total valid votes/expense limit		5,696	99.46	–	$66,923.01
Total rejected ballots		31	0.54		
Turnout		5,727	52.12		
Eligible voters		10,989			
Progressive Conservative hold		Swing		+10.90	
Source: Elections Nova Scotia

=== 2017 ===
2017 Nova Scotia general election
Party	Candidate	Votes	%	±%
Progressive Conservative	Jamie Baillie	3,536	51.49	+0.53
Liberal	Kenny John Jackson	2,779	40.47	+0.26
New Democratic	Larry Duchesne	398	5.80	-0.98
Atlantica	Thor Lengies	154	2.24	
Total valid votes		6,897	100.00	
Total rejected ballots		35	0.51	-0.19
Turnout		6,902	62.37	-3.36
Eligible voters		11,066		
Progressive Conservative hold		Swing		+0.14
Source: Elections Nova Scotia

=== 2018 by-election ===
Nova Scotia provincial by-election, June 19, 2018 Resignation of Jamie Baillie
Party	Candidate	Votes	%	±%	Expenditures
Progressive Conservative	Tory Rushton	3,417	59.19	+7.70	$22,387
Liberal	Scott Lockhart	1,829	31.68	-8.79	$32,332
New Democratic	Larry Duchesne	292	5.06	-0.74	$9,239
Green	Bruce McCulloch	235	4.07	—	$1,234
Total valid votes		5,773			
Total rejected ballots		17			
Turnout		5,773	53.02	-9.35	
Eligible voters		10,889			
Progressive Conservative hold		Swing		+8.24	
Source: Elections Nova Scotia

=== 2013 ===
2013 Nova Scotia general election
Party	Candidate	Votes	%	±%
Progressive Conservative	Jamie Baillie	3,655	50.96%	-6.24%
Liberal	Kenny John Jackson	2,884	40.21%	2.25%
New Democratic	Larry Duchesne	486	6.78%	1.94%
Green	Bruce W. McCulloch	147	2.05%	–
Total valid votes		7,172	100.00	
Total rejected ballots		50	0.7	
Turnout		7,222	65.73	
Eligible voters		10,987		
Source(s) Source: Nova Scotia Legislature (2024). "Electoral History for Cumberland South" (PDF). nslegislature.ca. Nova Scotia, Chief Electoral Officer (2013). 39th Provincial General Election, October 8, 2013: Volume 1 – Statement of Votes & Statistics (PDF) (Report). Elections Nova Scotia. Archived from the original (PDF) on 10 April 2018.

=== 2010 by-election ===
Nova Scotia provincial by-election, October 26, 2010
Party	Candidate	Votes	%	±%
Progressive Conservative	Jamie Baillie	3,262	57.20%	-10.46%
Liberal	Kenny John Jackson	2,165	37.96%	32.89%
New Democratic	R. Scott McKee	276	4.84%	-21.06%
Total		5,703	–	
Source(s) Source: Nova Scotia Legislature (2024). "Electoral History for Cumberland South" (PDF). nslegislature.ca.

=== 2009 ===
2009 Nova Scotia general election
Party	Candidate	Votes	%	±%
Progressive Conservative	Murray Scott	4,334	67.66%	-9.00%
New Democratic	Don Tabor	1,659	25.90%	14.55%
Liberal	Joey Archibald	325	5.07%	-5.34%
Green	Daniel Melvin	88	1.37%	-0.01%
Total		6,406	–	
Source(s) Source: Nova Scotia Legislature (2024). "Electoral History for Cumberland South" (PDF). nslegislature.ca.

=== 2006 ===
2006 Nova Scotia general election
Party	Candidate	Votes	%	±%
Progressive Conservative	Murray Scott	5,087	76.66%	4.97%
New Democratic	Andrew Kernohan	753	11.35%	0.44%
Liberal	Mary Dee MacPherson	691	10.41%	-6.99%
Green	James Dessart	92	1.39%	–
Independent	David Raymond Amos	13	0.20%	–
Total		6,636	–	
Source(s) Source: Nova Scotia Legislature (2024). "Electoral History for Cumberland South" (PDF). nslegislature.ca.

=== 2003 ===
2003 Nova Scotia general election
Party	Candidate	Votes	%	±%
Progressive Conservative	Murray Scott	4,898	71.69%	-2.32%
Liberal	Harriet McCready	1,189	17.40%	4.01%
New Democratic	R. Scott McKee	745	10.90%	-1.70%
Total		6,832	–	
Source(s) Source: Nova Scotia Legislature (2024). "Electoral History for Cumberland South" (PDF). nslegislature.ca.

=== 1999 ===
1999 Nova Scotia general election
Party	Candidate	Votes	%	±%
Progressive Conservative	Murray Scott	5,527	74.01%	15.32%
Liberal	John Harrison	1,000	13.39%	-13.41%
New Democratic	Scott MacKee	941	12.60%	-0.96%
Total		7,468	–	
Source(s) Source: Nova Scotia Legislature (2024). "Electoral History for Cumberland South" (PDF). nslegislature.ca. Nova Scotia, Chief Electoral Officer (1999). Returns of the General Election for the House of Assembly, Thirty-Fifth General Election (Report). Elections Nova Scotia.

=== 1998 ===
1998 Nova Scotia general election
Party	Candidate	Votes	%	±%
Progressive Conservative	Murray Scott	4,714	58.69%	41.00%
Liberal	Mike Uberoi	2,153	26.81%	-48.83%
New Democratic	Sandy Graham	1,089	13.56%	8.70%
Independent	James MacLeod	76	0.95%	–
Total		8,032	–	
Source(s) Source: Nova Scotia Legislature (2024). "Electoral History for Cumberland South" (PDF). nslegislature.ca.

=== 1993 ===
1993 Nova Scotia general election
Party	Candidate	Votes	%	±%
Liberal	Guy Brown	6,713	75.63%	–
Progressive Conservative	Mac Bennett	1,570	17.69%	–
New Democratic	Douglas Meekins	431	4.86%	–
Independent	Philip T. Donkin	162	1.83%	–
Total		8,876	–	
Source(s) Source: Nova Scotia Legislature (2024). "Electoral History for Cumberland South" (PDF). nslegislature.ca. Nova Scotia, Chief Electoral Officer (1993). Returns of the General Election for the House of Assembly, Thirty-Third General Election (PDF) (Report). Queen's Printer. Archived from the original (PDF) on 18 June 2018.

== See also ==
- List of Nova Scotia provincial electoral districts
- Canadian provincial electoral districts
