= Richard L. Weldon =

Canadian politician (1932–2020)

MLA for Dartmouth East
- In office 1978–1984
- Preceded by: new riding
- Succeeded by: Jim Smith

Personal details
- Born: December 26, 1932 Halifax, Nova Scotia, Canada
- Died: July 25, 2020 (aged 87) Middleton, Nova Scotia, Canada
- Party: Progressive Conservative
- Occupation: Lawyer

Richard Laurence Weldon (December 26, 1932 – July 25, 2020) was a Canadian politician. He represented the electoral district of Dartmouth East in the Nova Scotia House of Assembly from 1978 to 1984. He is a member of the Nova Scotia Progressive Conservative Party.

== Early life ==
Weldon was born in Halifax, Nova Scotia. He attended Dalhousie University where he earned a Bachelor of Laws degree, and was a lawyer. He is the grandson of Richard Chapman Weldon, founder and first dean of Dalhousie Law School.

== Political career ==
Weldon has served on Dartmouth City Council, and is a former deputy mayor of the city.

== Personal life ==
He is married to Joan Devanney. Weldon died on July 25, 2020.
