= A. Lloyd MacDonald =

Canadian politician

MLA for Pictou East
- In office 1970–1974
- Preceded by: Thomas MacQueen
- Succeeded by: Donald Cameron
- In office 1963–1967
- Preceded by: John W. MacDonald
- Succeeded by: Thomas MacQueen

Personal details
- Born: Alexander Lloyd MacDonald; February 8, 1921 Garden of Eden, Nova Scotia
- Died: March 9, 2007 (aged 86) New Glasgow, Nova Scotia
- Party: Liberal
- Occupation: industrial supervisor

Alexander Lloyd MacDonald (February 8, 1921 – March 9, 2007) was a Canadian politician. He represented the electoral district of Pictou East in the Nova Scotia House of Assembly from 1963 to 1967, and 1970 to 1974. He was a member of the Nova Scotia Liberal Party.

MacDonald was born in 1921 at Garden of Eden, Nova Scotia. He married Margaret Elizabeth Dickie in 1948, and was employed as a supervisor at the Hawker Siddeley manufacturing plant in Trenton, Nova Scotia.

MacDonald entered provincial politics in the 1963 election, winning the Pictou East riding by 11 votes. He was defeated by Progressive Conservative Thomas MacQueen when he ran for re-election in 1967. MacDonald regained the seat in the 1970 election, defeating MacQueen by 19 votes. He did not reoffer in the 1974 election. MacDonald died in New Glasgow on March 9, 2007.
