= D. Scott MacNutt =

Canadian politician

The Honourable D. Scott MacNutt ECNS
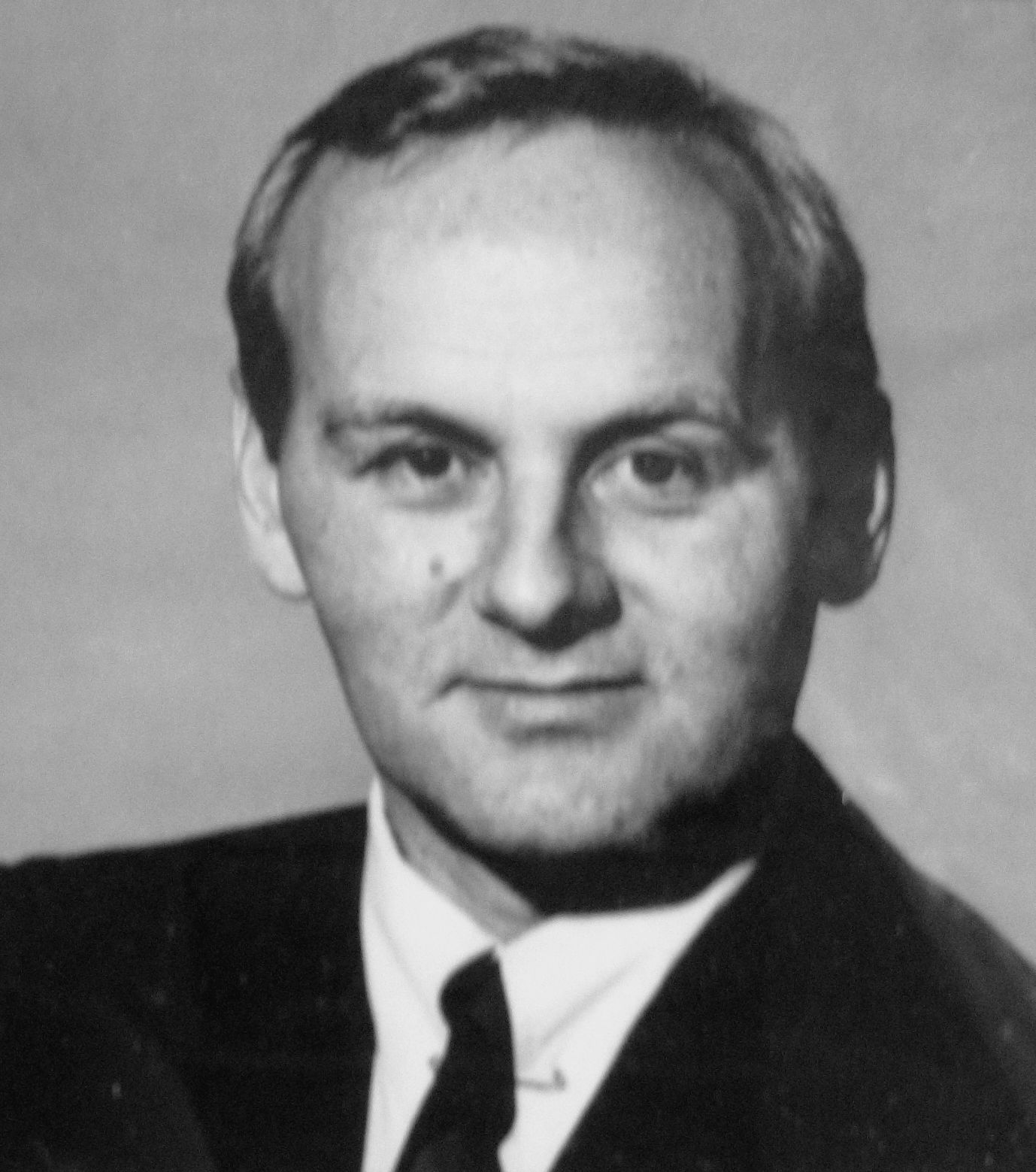
- MacNutt, c. 1973

MLA for Dartmouth South
- In office 1970–1974
- Preceded by: Irvin William Akerley
- Succeeded by: Roland J. Thornhill

Personal details
- Born: Donald Scott MacNutt; May 5, 1935 Digby, Nova Scotia
- Died: September 13, 2010 (aged 75) Halifax, Nova Scotia
- Party: Nova Scotia Liberal Party
- Occupation: businessman

Donald Scott MacNutt (May 5, 1935 – September 13, 2010) was a Canadian politician. He represented the electoral district of Dartmouth South in the Nova Scotia House of Assembly from 1970 to 1974. He was a member of the Nova Scotia Liberal Party.

MacNutt was born in Digby, Nova Scotia. He attended St. Francis Xavier University and was a businessman. In 1961, he married Anna Dawn Reid. He died on September 13, 2010, aged 75, following a brief bout with cancer.

MacNutt entered provincial politics in the 1970 election, defeating Progressive Conservative incumbent I. W. Akerley by 91 votes in Dartmouth South. On October 28, 1970, MacNutt was appointed to the Executive Council of Nova Scotia as Minister of Health. He was given an additional role in cabinet as Minister of Labour in September 1972. MacNutt was defeated by Roland J. Thornhill when he ran for re-election in the 1974 election. Prior to the 1998 election, MacNutt was a candidate for the Liberal nomination in his old Dartmouth South riding, but was defeated for the nomination by municipal politician Bruce Hetherington.
