= Donald Cameron (Nova Scotia premier) =

Canadian politician (1946–2021)

The Honourable Donald Cameron ECNS

22nd Premier of Nova Scotia
- In office February 26, 1991 – June 11, 1993
- Monarch: Elizabeth II
- Lieutenant Governor: Lloyd Crouse
- Preceded by: Roger Bacon
- Succeeded by: John Savage

MLA for Pictou East
- In office April 2, 1974 – May 25, 1993
- Preceded by: A. Lloyd MacDonald
- Succeeded by: Wayne Fraser

Personal details
- Born: May 20, 1946 Egerton, Nova Scotia, Canada
- Died: May 3, 2021 (aged 74) New Glasgow, Nova Scotia, Canada
- Party: Progressive Conservative
- Education: McGill University (B.S.)

Donald William Cameron (May 20, 1946 – May 3, 2021) was a Canadian politician who served as the 22nd premier of Nova Scotia from February 1991 to June 1993. He represented the electoral district of Pictou East in the Nova Scotia House of Assembly from 1974 to 1993, as a member of the Progressive Conservative Party of Nova Scotia. Following his political career, he was appointed the Canadian Consul General to New England.

== Early life and education ==
Cameron was born in Egerton, Nova Scotia, on May 20, 1946. His parents were Helen and William David Cameron, and he was raised on their family farm. He graduated from McGill University with a Bachelor of Science degree in 1968.

== Political career ==
Cameron entered provincial politics in the 1974 election, defeating Liberal Lester MacLellan by 272 votes in the Pictou East riding. He was re-elected in the 1978 election by almost 2,000 votes. On October 5, 1978, Cameron was appointed to the Executive Council of Nova Scotia as Minister of Fisheries and Minister of Recreation. He resigned from cabinet on June 25, 1980. He was re-elected in the 1981 and 1984 elections. On April 20, 1988, Cameron was reappointed to cabinet as Minister of Industry, Trade and Technology. Cameron was re-elected in the 1988 election, defeating Liberal Wayne Fraser by 753 votes.

In September 1990, John Buchanan resigned as premier, and a leadership convention was scheduled for February 1991. On November 2, 1990, Cameron announced his candidacy for the leadership of the Progressive Conservative Party of Nova Scotia. At the leadership convention, on February 9, 1991, Cameron led through the first two ballots and defeated Roland J. Thornhill by 143 votes on the third ballot to win the leadership. He was sworn in as the 22nd premier of Nova Scotia on February 26.

=== Premier of Nova Scotia ===
Cameron's administration was known for a smaller cabinet, supporting anti-discrimination measures, and amending the human rights act to extend protection to gays and lesbians. His government also privatized Nova Scotia Power Incorporated, the largest privatization move in Canada at the time. Cameron also introduced merit-based hiring codes, signed on to the Atlantic Procurement Agreement and introduced mandatory testing in grades 3, 6, 9 and 12 with public release of test scores. Cameron's government established a nonpartisan electoral boundaries revision commission in an attempt to end gerrymandering.

Cameron began the practice of non-political appointment of judges, deregulation of gasoline prices and made investments in double-stack rail service from the Port of Halifax (benefitting the TrentonWorks rail car plant in his riding) as well as four-lane highways. His efforts in ending party patronage marked a change in politics in Nova Scotia that his successors – John Savage and John Hamm – were able to continue, making appointments more transparent.

Cameron was noted as a vocal supporter of a development project that turned deadly. He was instrumental, first as a local MLA, then as industry minister in the government of John Buchanan, and then as premier, in the development of the Westray Mine in Pictou County, Nova Scotia. Many expressed concern in the provincial media for the safety of workers in such a mine. While coal mining typically releases explosive methane gas, the location of the mine was in an area of Pictou County that had an unusually high level of methane. However, despite the opposition from federal bureaucrats, opposition politicians and the Cape Breton Development Corporation (Devco), a federal crown agency responsible for coal mining in Cape Breton, Westray Mine was developed through the late eighties and opened in 1991 with significant provincial and federal government assistance. Subsequently, a methane gas explosion killed 26 miners on May 9, 1992.

Cameron's government is also remembered for continuing the Buchanan policy in supporting development of the controversial Point Aconi Generating Station project.

In the 1993 election, Cameron won personal re-election in his Pictou East riding, but his government was defeated in a landslide by the Nova Scotia Liberal Party under John Savage. On election night, Cameron announced his resignation as both party leader and MLA for Pictou East.

== Personal life ==
Cameron married Rosemary Simpson in 1969. They met while studying at McGill. Together, they had three children: Natalie, David, and Christine.

Cameron died at Aberdeen Hospital in New Glasgow, Nova Scotia on May 3, 2021, at the age of 74.
