= Avondale, Pictou, Nova Scotia =

Community in Nova Scotia, Canada

Coordinates: 45°38′10.49″N 62°18′9.08″W

Avondale in Nova Scotia

Avondale is a community in the Canadian province of Nova Scotia, located in Pictou County.
