= Claudia Chender =

Canadian politician

Claudia Chender MLA
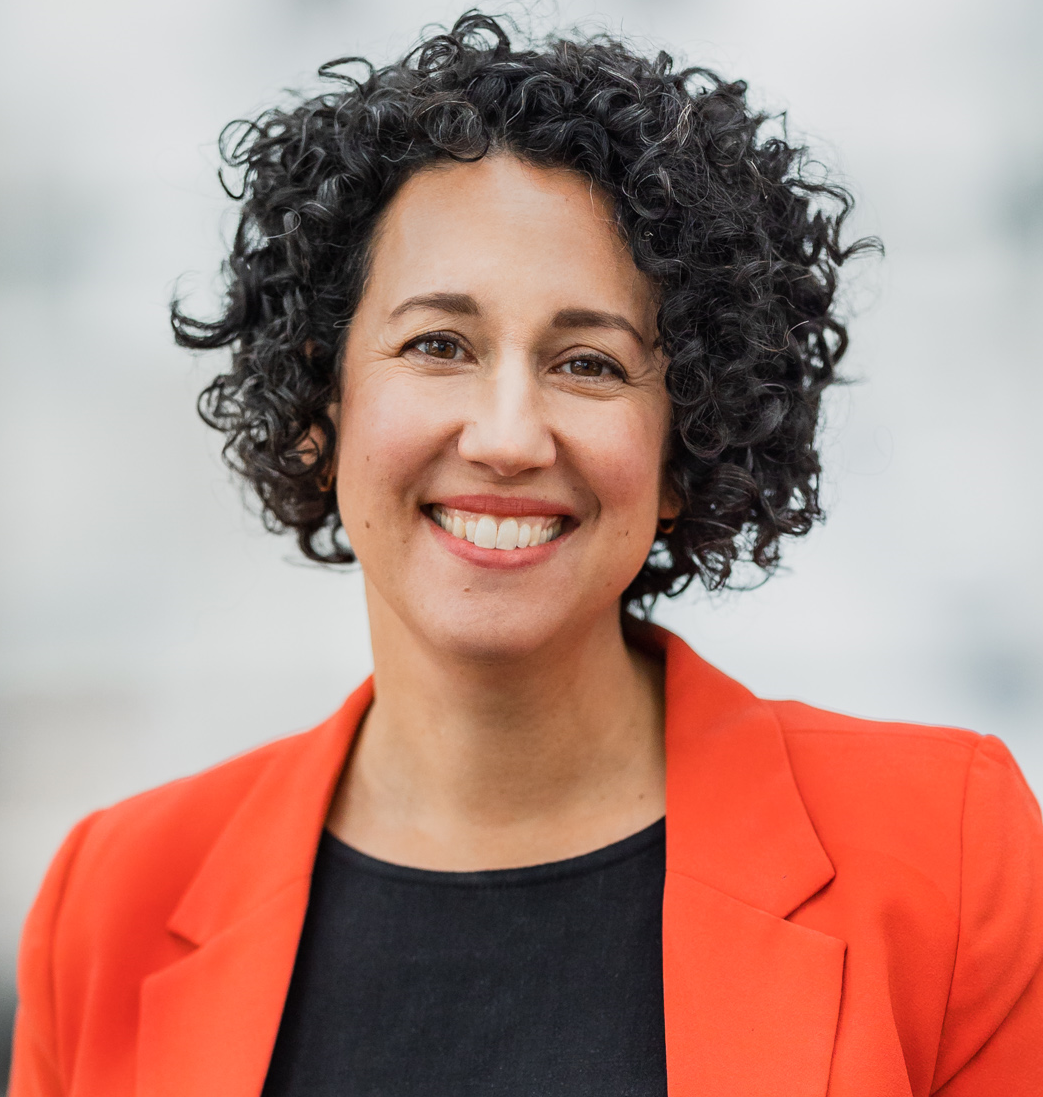
- Chender in 2023

Leader of the Opposition of Nova Scotia
- Incumbent
- Assumed office December 10, 2024
- Preceded by: Zach Churchill

Leader of the Nova Scotia New Democratic Party
- Incumbent
- Assumed office June 25, 2022
- Preceded by: Gary Burrill

Member of the Nova Scotia House of Assembly for Dartmouth South
- Incumbent
- Assumed office May 30, 2017
- Preceded by: Marian Mancini

Personal details
- Born: July 29, 1976 (age 50) New York City, U.S.
- Party: New Democratic Party
- Spouse: Jamie MacLellan
- Children: 3
- Education: Dalhousie University (BA); University of Victoria (JD)
- Occupation: Lawyer

Claudia Chender (born July 29, 1976) is a Canadian politician and lawyer who has served as the leader of the Nova Scotia New Democratic Party since June 25, 2022. She was first elected to the Nova Scotia House of Assembly in the 2017 general election, representing the electoral district of Dartmouth South. She became Nova Scotia's first female leader of the Opposition on a permanent basis, after her party won the second most seats in the 2024 general election.

== Early life and education ==
Chender attended Dalhousie University in Halifax, where she graduated with a bachelor of arts in 1999. She went on to earn a bachelor of laws from the University of Victoria in 2004. Prior to entering politics, she worked with the Nova Scotia Barrister's Society as a legal educator, as well as holding a position as an associate producer with a non-profit media company. Three of Chender's grandparents were Holocaust survivors and she was taught about the Holocaust by her Polish-Jewish grandmother. Many of her relatives died in the Holocaust, including some at Auschwitz.

== Leader of the Nova Scotia NDP ==
After the 2021 Nova Scotia general election, provincial NDP leader Gary Burrill re-appointed Chender as the party's House Leader, a role she had held since 2018. She returned to her role as the spokesperson for Justice and Status of Women as well as the critic for Economic Development and Natural Resources and Renewables.

On November 9, 2021, Burrill announced that he would resign as leader once a successor was chosen at a future convention. On February 14, 2022, Chender declared her candidacy to replace Burrill as leader of the Nova Scotia New Democratic Party (NSNDP). On May 21, 2022 registration closed for the leadership race, with Chender being the sole candidate.

Chender was elected leader of the Nova Scotia NDP after a general membership vote on June 25, 2022. She is the third female leader of the NSNDP, following Alexa McDonough and Helen MacDonald; fourth leader, if interim leader Maureen MacDonald is included.

In October 2023, Chender was removed from the legislature after challenging Education Minister Becky Druhan's statement that every student in Nova Scotia had access to food in schools. The government later launched a "pay-what-you-can" school food program.

On September 12, 2024, the legislature passed Chender's bill declaring domestic violence an epidemic with all-party support. The bill legislated a recommendation from the Mass Casualty Commission, which investigated the 2020 Nova Scotia attacks.

== Electoral record ==
2024 Nova Scotia general election: Dartmouth South
| Party | Candidate | Votes | % | ±% |
|---|---|---|---|---|
| New Democratic | Claudia Chender | 4,415 | 68.46 | +10.33 |
| Progressive Conservative | Bea MacGregor | 1,449 | 22.47 | +5.04 |
| Liberal | Barb Henderson | 585 | 9.07 | –13.07 |
| Total valid votes | | 6,449 | 99.40 | |
| Total rejected ballots | | 39 | 0.60 | +0.24 |
| Turnout | | 6,488 | 47.68 | –5.28 |
| Eligible voters | | 13,607 | | |
| New Democratic hold | | Swing | | +7.68 |
Source: Elections Nova Scotia

2021 Nova Scotia general election: Dartmouth South
| Party | Candidate | Votes | % | ±% | Expenditures |
|---|---|---|---|---|---|
| New Democratic | Claudia Chender | 4,209 | 58.13 | +18.48 | $56,622.56 |
| Liberal | Lesley MacKay | 1,603 | 22.14 | -15.31 | $18,386.71 |
| Progressive Conservative | Chris Curtis | 1,262 | 17.43 | +1.57 | $31,677.39 |
| Green | Skylar Martini | 167 | 2.31 | -3.35 | $200.00 |
| Total valid votes/expense limit | | 7,241 | 99.64 | – | $80,768.46 |
| Total rejected ballots | | 26 | 0.36 | | |
| Turnout | | 7,267 | 52.96 | | |
| Eligible voters | | 13,721 | | | |
| New Democratic hold | | Swing | | +16.90 | |
Source: Elections Nova Scotia

2017 Nova Scotia general election: Dartmouth South
| Party | Candidate | Votes | % | ±% |
|---|---|---|---|---|
| New Democratic | Claudia Chender | 3,545 | 39.65% | +4.40 |
| Liberal | Vishal Bhardwaj | 3,348 | 37.45% | +3.46 |
| Progressive Conservative | Jad Crnogorac | 1,418 | 15.86% | -7.30 |
| Green | June Trenholm | 506 | 5.66% | |
| Atlantica | Jim Murray | 123 | 1.38% | |
| Total valid votes | | 9,007 | 99.26 | |
| Total rejected ballots | | 67 | 0.74 | |
| Turnout | | 9,074 | 51.56 | |
| Eligible voters | | 17,598 | | |
| New Democratic hold | | Swing | | +0.47 |
Source: Elections Nova Scotia
