= Egerton, Nova Scotia =

Community in Nova Scotia, Canada

Coordinates: 45°36′6.44″N 62°29′2.6″W

Egerton in Nova Scotia

Egerton is a small community in the Canadian province of Nova Scotia, located in Pictou County. A railway line operated by Cape Breton and Central Nova Scotia Railway and formerly by Canadian National Railway passes through Egerton.
