= John Savage (Nova Scotia politician) =

Premier of Nova Scotia from 1993 to 1997

John Savage OC ONS

23rd Premier of Nova Scotia
- In office June 11, 1993 – July 18, 1997
- Monarch: Elizabeth II
- Lieutenant Governor: Lloyd Crouse; James Kinley
- Preceded by: Don W. Cameron
- Succeeded by: Russell MacLellan

MLA for Dartmouth South
- In office May 25, 1993 – March 24, 1998
- Preceded by: Roland J. Thornhill
- Succeeded by: Don Chard

Leader of the Nova Scotia Liberal Party
- In office June 20, 1992 – March 20, 1997
- Preceded by: Vince MacLean
- Succeeded by: Russell MacLellan

Personal details
- Born: John Patrick Savage; May 28, 1932 Newport, Wales
- Died: May 13, 2003 (aged 70) Dartmouth, Nova Scotia, Canada
- Party: Liberal
- Spouse: Margaret Mary McCartan
- Children: 7, including Mike Savage
- Education: Queen's University Belfast
- Occupation: Physician

John Patrick Savage OC ONS (May 28, 1932 – May 13, 2003) was a Welsh-born Canadian physician and politician. Savage was the 23rd premier of Nova Scotia between 1993 and 1997. He was born in Wales, and educated in both the United Kingdom and Ireland. He immigrated to Canada in 1967 and was a noted family physician in Dartmouth, Nova Scotia. He became the mayor of Dartmouth in 1985, and won re-election twice. He then became the leader of the Nova Scotia Liberal Party in 1992 and stepped down as mayor. In 1993, he defeated the incumbent provincial government and became premier. Savage was a controversial premier, bringing in many reforms in taxation, regional government, and government hiring practices. He resigned as premier in 1997 due to his low approval ratings in public polls. He died of cancer at the age of 70 in 2003. He was the father of Mike Savage, former mayor of the Halifax Regional Municipality.

== Early life ==
Born in Newport, Wales, he was the son of an Irish Roman Catholic doctor father and a Welsh Baptist housewife mother. He attended school at Prior Park College, Bath, before attending Queen's University of Belfast to become a physician.

== Nova Scotia ==
He was generally unhappy with the United Kingdom's government-run healthcare system known as the National Health Service. When he saw an advertisement for doctors in the Canadian province of Nova Scotia, Savage decided to pack up his family and move across the ocean to continue his medical practice in 1967. He made a name for himself as the "hippie doctor" in the 1970s, due to his beard and progressive health stances. By setting up a detox centre — and a free clinic in the economically disadvantaged and mostly black community of North Preston — he assured his reputation as a left-winger.

He started his political life running for federal office in the Halifax area in the 1970s. He was defeated twice as a federal Liberal Party candidate. In 1985, he ran successfully to become the mayor of Dartmouth, Nova Scotia, where he lived. He was re-elected as mayor in both 1988 and 1991.

== Premier of Nova Scotia ==
The Nova Scotia Liberal Party had its annual general meeting in Dartmouth on February 29, 1992. Savage attended a session of the meeting to bring greetings from the City of Dartmouth, in his capacity as its mayor, but didn't realize that the party's rank and file were about to oust their long-time leader, Vince McLean. He was approached to run for the Liberal leadership and took a leave of absence from his mayoral duties. The election was held by computerized telephone balloting, and he won on the second ballot in June 1992.

On May 25, 1993, Savage defeated sitting Premier Donald Cameron and the governing Progressive Conservatives in the 1993 provincial election, winning 40 of the legislature's 52 seats.

During his term as premier, and saddled with huge operating debts left by the previous government and declining equalization payments from the federal government of Jean Chrétien, he became a tough fiscal conservative, balancing the provincial budget in 1996 for the first time since 1978.

In doing so, he imposed 4 day layoff of thousands of civil servants. Other programs, such as constructing a toll highway, municipal amalgamations by creating the Cape Breton Regional Municipality and the Halifax Regional Municipality, and the implementation of the Harmonized Sales Tax were initiated under his watch.

His government also led the country in the creation of tougher anti-smoking legislation, consolidation of school boards and local health authorities, creation of the Queen Elizabeth II Health Sciences Centre, the establishment of one of the most modern emergency health services in North America along with province-wide emergency field communications systems, modernizing its vocational schools to form an independent NSCC, and he waged a tough and ultimately successful fight against an entrenched patronage system in the provincial Department of Transportation and Public Works, as well as within his own political party.

Savage's detractors labelled him as inexperienced and stubborn. Faced with increasing discontent from within his own party over some of his anti-patronage policies, and after surviving a July 1995 leadership review vote, he resigned as premier in 1997. In its editorial page on March 22, 1997, The Globe and Mail, after citing his list of reforms, called him "the best premier in a generation," and berated both Liberal party members and the public for forcing him to resign.

== Later life and death ==
After Savage resigned, he and his wife Margaret traveled to Africa to perform missionary work. They worked in The Gambia, providing HIV/AIDS education to youth.

In 2001, he acknowledged he had stomach cancer, which had metastasized. He died on May 13, 2003. Just three days before his death, he was made an officer of the Order of Canada. He died in Dartmouth, Nova Scotia, about six weeks after his wife's death from cancer.

Savage and his wife had seven children, with their son Mike Savage following in his father's footsteps and becoming the mayor of the Halifax Regional Municipality in 2012.

== Electoral history ==
1993 Nova Scotia general election: Dartmouth South
Party	Candidate	Votes	%	±%
Liberal	John Savage	4,346	44.25%	12.47%
Progressive Conservative	Colin May	3,091	31.47%	-15.86%
New Democratic	Don Chard	2,221	22.61%	1.73%
Natural Law	Alexander J. Gillis	163	1.66%	–
Total		9,821	–	
Source(s) Source: Nova Scotia Legislature (2021). "Electoral History for Dartmouth South" (PDF). nslegislature.ca. Nova Scotia. Chief Electoral Officer (1993). Returns of the General Election for the House of Assembly, Thirty-Third General Election (PDF). Queen's Printer.

== Bibliography ==
- Clancy, Peter; Bickerton, James; Haddow, Rodney and Stewart, Ian. (2000) The Savage Years: The Perils of Reinventing Government in Nova Scotia. Halifax: Formac Publishing Company Limited. ISBN 978-0-8878-0509-7
- Ruck, Lindsay (2019). Against the Grain: A Biography of Dr. John Savage. Lawrencetown Beach, N.S.: Pottersfield Press. ISBN 978-1-9882-8696-9.
