= Marilyn More =

Canadian politician

The Honourable Marilyn More ECNS

Member of the Nova Scotia House of Assembly for Dartmouth South-Portland Valley
- In office August 5, 2003 – October 8, 2013
- Preceded by: Tim Olive
- Succeeded by: Allan Rowe

Minister of Education
- In office June 19, 2009 – January 11, 2011
- Preceded by: Judy Streatch
- Succeeded by: Ramona Jennex

Minister of Labour and Advanced Education
- In office June 19, 2009 – March 15, 2013
- Preceded by: Mark Parent
- Succeeded by: Frank Corbett

Personal details
- Party: NDP
- Occupation: educator

Marilyn More is a Canadian retired educator and politician from Nova Scotia.

A resident of Dartmouth, More worked as a teacher.

== Political career ==
More was first elected to political office in 1978, when she became the first woman to be elected to a school board in Nova Scotia, having been elected to the Dartmouth School Board for three consecutive terms. More has been active with the Nova Scotia New Democratic Party and is a past-President of the party.

In 2003 More successfully ran for the Nova Scotia New Democratic Party nomination in the riding of Dartmouth South-Portland Valley. More was elected in the 2003 provincial election and was re-elected in the 2006 and 2009 provincial elections.

On June 19, 2009 More was appointed to the Executive Council of Nova Scotia where she served as Minister of Education and Early Childhood Development, as well as Minister of Labour and Workforce Development, and Minister of Volunteerism. On January 11, 2011, Premier Darrell Dexter shuffled his cabinet, naming More as Minister of Labour and Advanced Education as well as the minister of both Immigration and Status of Women. On March 15, 2013, More was shuffled to Minister responsible for the Public Service Commission, Communications Nova Scotia and the Status of Women.

More did not run for re-election in the 2013 provincial election.
