= Dartmouth South =

Provincial electoral district in Nova Scotia, Canada

Nova Scotia electoral district
- Dartmouth South in relation to other ridings in the Metro Halifax area

Provincial electoral district
- Legislature: Nova Scotia House of Assembly
MLA
Claudia Chender
New Democratic
- District created: 1967
- First contested: 1967
- Last contested: 2024

Demographics
- Population (2016): 27,284
- Electors: 17,940
- Area (km²): 8.00
- Pop. density (per km²): 3,410.5
- Census division: Halifax Regional Municipality

Dartmouth South is a provincial electoral district in Nova Scotia, Canada, that elects one member of the Nova Scotia House of Assembly. The riding is currently represented by Claudia Chender of the NDP. The district was created in 1966, under the name Dartmouth City South, when Halifax County Dartmouth was divided into two electoral districts. In 1967, the district was renamed Dartmouth South. In 2003, the district was renamed Dartmouth South – Portland Valley. In 2013 following the Nova Scotia Electoral Boundaries Commission review, the district returned to its earlier name of Dartmouth South and lost the area south of Russell Lake and east of Highway 111 to Cole Harbour-Eastern Passage.

== Geography ==
The electoral district of Dartmouth South is about 8 km^{2} (3.1 sq mi) in landmass.

== Members of the Legislative Assembly ==
This riding has elected the following members of the Legislative Assembly:

Legislature	Years	Member	Party
Dartmouth South; Riding created from Halifax County Dartmouth
49th	1967–1970	Irvin William Akerley	Progressive Conservative
50th	1970–1974	D. Scott MacNutt	Liberal
51st	1974–1978	Roland Thornhill	Progressive Conservative
52nd	1978–1981	Roland Thornhill	Progressive Conservative
53rd	1981–1984	Roland Thornhill	Progressive Conservative
54th	1984–1988	Roland Thornhill	Progressive Conservative
55th	1988–1993	Roland Thornhill	Progressive Conservative
56th	1993–1998	John Savage	Liberal
57th	1998–1999	Don Chard	New Democratic
58th	1999–2003	Tim Olive	Progressive Conservative
Dartmouth South-Portland Valley
59th	2003–2006	Marilyn More	New Democratic
60th	2006–2009	Marilyn More	New Democratic
61st	2009–2013	Marilyn More	New Democratic
Dartmouth South
62nd	2013–2015	Allan Rowe	Liberal
62nd	2015–2017	Marian Mancini	New Democratic
63rd	2017–2021	Claudia Chender	New Democratic
64th	2021–2024	Claudia Chender	New Democratic
65th	2024–present	Claudia Chender	New Democratic

== Election results ==
=== 2024 ===
2024 Nova Scotia general election
Party	Candidate	Votes	%	±%
New Democratic	Claudia Chender	4,415	68.46	+10.33
Progressive Conservative	Bea MacGregor	1,449	22.47	+5.04
Liberal	Barb Henderson	585	9.07	–13.07
Total valid votes		6,449	99.40	
Total rejected ballots		39	0.60	+0.24
Turnout		6,488	47.68	–5.28
Eligible voters		13,607		
New Democratic hold		Swing		+7.68
Source: Elections Nova Scotia

=== 2021 ===
2021 Nova Scotia general election
Party	Candidate	Votes	%	±%	Expenditures
New Democratic	Claudia Chender	4,209	58.13	+18.48	$56,622.56
Liberal	Lesley MacKay	1,603	22.14	-15.31	$18,386.71
Progressive Conservative	Chris Curtis	1,262	17.43	+1.57	$31,677.39
Green	Skylar Martini	167	2.31	-3.35	$200.00
Total valid votes/expense limit		7,241	99.64	–	$80,768.46
Total rejected ballots		26	0.36		
Turnout		7,267	52.96		
Eligible voters		13,721			
New Democratic hold		Swing		+16.90	
Source: Elections Nova Scotia

=== 2017 ===
2017 Nova Scotia general election
Party	Candidate	Votes	%	±%
New Democratic	Claudia Chender	3,545	39.65%	+4.40
Liberal	Vishal Bhardwaj	3,348	37.45%	+3.46
Progressive Conservative	Jad Crnogorac	1,418	15.86%	-7.30
Green	June Trenholm	506	5.66%	
Atlantica	Jim Murray	123	1.38%	
Total valid votes		9,007	99.26	
Total rejected ballots		67	0.74	
Turnout		9,074	51.56	
Eligible voters		17,598		
New Democratic hold		Swing		+0.47
Source: Elections Nova Scotia

=== 2015 by-election ===
Nova Scotia provincial by-election, July 14, 2015 On the death of Allan Rowe
Party	Candidate	Votes	%	±%
New Democratic	Marian Mancini	2,274	35.25	+1.93
Liberal	Timothy Wayne Rissesco	2,193	33.99	-12.24
Progressive Conservative	Gord William Gamble	1,494	23.16	+4.75
Independent	Charlene Marion Gagnon	490	7.60	
Total valid votes		6,541	99.66	
Total rejected ballots		22	0.34	
Turnout		6,473	38.21	
Electors on the lists		17,940	–	
New Democratic gain from Liberal		Swing		+7.09

=== 2013 ===
2009 provincial election redistributed results
Party	Vote	%
New Democratic Party	4,607	55.57
Liberal	2,313	27.90
Progressive Conservative	1,098	13.24
Green	273	3.29

2013 Nova Scotia general election
Party	Candidate	Votes	%	±%
Liberal	Allan Rowe	4,049	46.24%	+18.34%
New Democratic	Mary Vingoe	2,918	33.32%	-22.24%
Progressive Conservative	Gord W. Gamble	1,612	18.41%	+5.16%
Independent	James Anthony (Jim) Murray	178	2.03%	–
Total		8,757	–	
Source(s) Source: Nova Scotia Legislature (2024). "Electoral History for Dartmouth South" (PDF). nslegislature.ca. Nova Scotia, Chief Electoral Officer (2013). 39th Provincial General Election, October 8, 2013: Volume 1 – Statement of Votes & Statistics (PDF) (Report). Elections Nova Scotia. Archived from the original (PDF) on 10 April 2018.

=== 2009 ===
2009 Nova Scotia general election: Dartmouth South-Portland Valley
Party	Candidate	Votes	%	±%
New Democratic	Marilyn More	5,583	54.59%	6.71%
Liberal	Colin Hebb	2,946	28.80%	12.72%
Progressive Conservative	George Jordan	1,389	13.58%	-18.85%
Green	David Croft	310	3.03%	-0.58%
Total		10,228	–	
Source(s) Source: Nova Scotia Legislature (2024). "Electoral History for Dartmouth South-Portland Valley" (PDF). nslegislature.ca.

=== 2006 ===
2006 Nova Scotia general election: Dartmouth South-Portland Valley
Party	Candidate	Votes	%	±%
New Democratic	Marilyn More	4,493	47.88%	4.57%
Progressive Conservative	Tim Olive	3,043	32.43%	0.73%
Liberal	Brian Hiltz	1,509	16.08%	-8.91%
Green	Danny Melvin	339	3.61%	–
Total		9,384	–	
Source(s) Source: Nova Scotia Legislature (2024). "Electoral History for Dartmouth South-Portland Valley" (PDF). nslegislature.ca.

=== 2003 ===
2003 Nova Scotia general election: Dartmouth South-Portland Valley
Party	Candidate	Votes	%	±%
New Democratic	Marilyn More	3,844	43.31%	9.82%
Progressive Conservative	Tim Olive	2,813	31.70%	-8.98%
Liberal	Colin A. MacEachern	2,218	24.99%	-0.84%
Total		8,875	–	
Source(s) Source: Nova Scotia Legislature (2024). "Electoral History for Dartmouth South-Portland Valley" (PDF). nslegislature.ca.

=== 1999 ===
1999 Nova Scotia general election
Party	Candidate	Votes	%	±%
Progressive Conservative	Tim Olive	3,656	40.67%	17.19%
New Democratic	Don Chard	3,011	33.50%	-7.63%
Liberal	Audrey Goodyer	2,322	25.83%	-9.56%
Total		8,989	–	
Source(s) Source: Nova Scotia Legislature (2024). "Electoral History for Dartmouth South" (PDF). nslegislature.ca. Nova Scotia, Chief Electoral Officer (1999). Returns of the General Election for the House of Assembly, Thirty-Fifth General Election (Report). Elections Nova Scotia.

=== 1998 ===
1998 Nova Scotia general election
Party	Candidate	Votes	%	±%
New Democratic	Don Chard	3,676	41.12%	18.51%
Liberal	Bruce Hetherington	3,164	35.40%	-8.86%
Progressive Conservative	Alan Billard	2,099	23.48%	-7.99%
Total		8,939	–	
Source(s) Source: Nova Scotia Legislature (2024). "Electoral History for Dartmouth South" (PDF). nslegislature.ca.

=== 1993 ===
1993 Nova Scotia general election
Party	Candidate	Votes	%	±%
Liberal	John Savage	4,346	44.25%	12.47%
Progressive Conservative	Colin May	3,091	31.47%	-15.86%
New Democratic	Don Chard	2,221	22.61%	1.73%
Natural Law	Alexander J. Gillis	163	1.66%	–
Total		9,821	–	
Source(s) Source: Nova Scotia Legislature (2024). "Electoral History for Dartmouth South" (PDF). nslegislature.ca. Nova Scotia, Chief Electoral Officer (1993). Returns of the General Election for the House of Assembly, Thirty-Third General Election (PDF) (Report). Queen's Printer. Archived from the original (PDF) on 18 June 2018.

=== 1988 ===
1988 Nova Scotia general election
Party	Candidate	Votes	%	±%
Progressive Conservative	Roland J. Thornhill	4,449	47.33%	-10.87%
Liberal	Allan Peters	2,987	31.78%	10.39%
New Democratic	Joanne Lamey	1,963	20.89%	0.47%
Total		9,399	–	
Source(s) Source: Nova Scotia Legislature (2024). "Electoral History for Dartmouth South" (PDF). nslegislature.ca. Nova Scotia, Chief Electoral Officer (1988). Returns of the General Election for the House of Assembly, Thirty-Second General Election (PDF) (Report). Queen's Printer. Archived from the original (PDF) on 7 July 2018.

=== 1984 ===
1984 Nova Scotia general election
Party	Candidate	Votes	%	±%
Progressive Conservative	Roland J. Thornhill	4,534	58.20%	11.40%
Liberal	Don Walker	1,666	21.39%	-5.97%
New Democratic	Fred Lutley	1,590	20.41%	-5.43%
Total		7,790	–	
Source(s) Source: Nova Scotia Legislature (2024). "Electoral History for Dartmouth South" (PDF). nslegislature.ca. Nova Scotia, Chief Electoral Officer (1984). Returns of the General Election for the House of Assembly, Thirty-First General Election (PDF) (Report). Queen's Printer. Archived from the original (PDF) on 31 July 2017.

=== 1981 ===
1981 Nova Scotia general election
Party	Candidate	Votes	%	±%
Progressive Conservative	Roland J. Thornhill	4,215	46.81%	-12.54%
Liberal	Will Chisholm	2,463	27.35%	1.97%
New Democratic	John Lewis Bregante	2,327	25.84%	10.57%
Total		9,005	–	
Source(s) Source: Nova Scotia Legislature (2024). "Electoral History for Dartmouth South" (PDF). nslegislature.ca. Nova Scotia, Chief Electoral Officer (1981). Returns of the General Election for the House of Assembly, Thirtieth General Election (PDF) (Report). Queen's Printer. Archived from the original (PDF) on 31 July 2017.

=== 1978 ===
1978 Nova Scotia general election
Party	Candidate	Votes	%	±%
Progressive Conservative	Roland J. Thornhill	5,530	59.35%	10.43%
Liberal	Norman Crawford	2,365	25.38%	-18.86%
New Democratic	Mike Marshall	1,423	15.27%	8.43%
Total		9,318	–	
Source(s) Source: Nova Scotia Legislature (2024). "Electoral History for Dartmouth South" (PDF). nslegislature.ca. Nova Scotia, Chief Electoral Officer (1978). Returns of the General Election for the House of Assembly, Twenty-Ninth General Election (PDF) (Report). Queen's Printer. Archived from the original (PDF) on 18 June 2018.

=== 1974 ===
1974 Nova Scotia general election
Party	Candidate	Votes	%	±%
Progressive Conservative	Roland J. Thornhill	6,491	48.91%	-0.65%
Liberal	D. Scott MacNutt	5,871	44.24%	-6.19%
New Democratic	Norman H. Dares	908	6.84%	–
Total		13,270	–	
Source(s) Source: Nova Scotia Legislature (2024). "Electoral History for Dartmouth South" (PDF). nslegislature.ca. Nova Scotia, Chief Electoral Officer (1974). Returns of the General Election for the House of Assembly, Twenty-Eighth General Election (PDF) (Report). Queen's Printer. Archived from the original (PDF) on 18 June 2018.

=== 1970 ===
1970 Nova Scotia general election
Party	Candidate	Votes	%	±%
Liberal	D. Scott MacNutt	5,304	50.43%	9.56%
Progressive Conservative	Irvin William Akerley	5,213	49.57%	-0.80%
Total		10,517	–	
Source(s) Source: Nova Scotia Legislature (2024). "Electoral History for Dartmouth South" (PDF). nslegislature.ca. Nova Scotia, Legislative Assembly (1970). Returns of the General Election for the House of Assembly, 1970 (PDF) (Report). Queen's Printer. Archived from the original (PDF) on 25 July 2018.

=== 1967 ===
1967 Nova Scotia general election
Party	Candidate	Votes	%	±%
Progressive Conservative	Irvin William Akerley	4,552	50.37%	–
Liberal	Eileen Stubbs	3,694	40.88%	–
New Democratic	Bruce Wallace	791	8.75%	–
Total		9,037	–	
Source(s) Source: Nova Scotia Legislature (2024). "Electoral History for Dartmouth South" (PDF). nslegislature.ca. Nova Scotia Legislature (1967). Returns of the General Election for the House of Assembly (PDF) (Report). Queen's Printer. Archived from the original (PDF) on 25 July 2018.

== See also ==
- List of Nova Scotia provincial electoral districts
- Canadian provincial electoral districts
