= 59th General Assembly of Nova Scotia =

2003–2006 House of Assembly session

- Minority parliament
- Sep. 4, 2003 – May. 13, 2006

Parliament leaders
- Premier: John Hamm; August 16, 1999 – February 24, 2006
- Rodney MacDonald; February 24, 2006
- Leader of the Opposition: Darrell Dexter; April 29, 2001

Party caucuses
- Government: Progressive Conservative Party
- Opposition: New Democratic Party
- Recognized: Liberal Party

House of Assembly
- Speaker of the House: Murray Scott; August 20, 1999 – February 24, 2006
- Cecil Clarke; March 3, 2006
- Government House leader: Ron Russell; August 20, 1999 – May 13, 2006
- Opposition House leader: Kevin Deveaux; September 4, 2003
- Members: 52 MLA seats

Sovereign
- Monarch: Elizabeth II; February 6, 1952
- Lieutenant governor: Myra Freeman; May 17, 2000

Sessions
- 1st session September 4, 2003 – May 4, 2006
- 2nd session May 4, 2006 – May 13, 2006
← 58th	→ 60th

59th General Assembly of Nova Scotia represented Nova Scotia from September 4, 2003 to May 13, 2006; its membership being set in the 2003 Nova Scotia general election. No party held a majority of the seats, but the Progressive Conservative Party of Nova Scotia (PC), under John Hamm, held the most and thus formed a minority government. Rodney MacDonald became PC leader and Premier in February 2006 after Hamm's resignation. The Assembly was dissolved May 13, 2006, at MacDonald's request.

== Division of seats ==
Affiliation	Members
Progressive Conservative Party	25
New Democratic Party	15
Liberal Party	10
Independent	1
Vacant	1
Total	52
Government majority (minority)	(2)

== List of members ==
Riding	Member	Party	First elected / previously elected
Annapolis	Stephen McNeil	Liberal	2003
Antigonish	**Angus MacIsaac**	Progressive Conservative	1969, (Note: Guysborough) 1999
Argyle	**Chris d'Entremont**	Progressive Conservative	2003
Bedford	Peter G. Christie	Progressive Conservative	1999
Cape Breton Centre	Frank Corbett	NDP	1998
Cape Breton North	Cecil Clarke†	Progressive Conservative	2001
Cape Breton Nova	Gordie Gosse	NDP	2003
Cape Breton South	Manning MacDonald	Liberal	1993
Cape Breton West	Russell MacKinnon	Liberal	1988, 1998
Cape Breton West	Russell MacKinnon	Independent (Note: left the Liberal party in 2005)	1988, 1998
Chester-St. Margaret's	John Chataway (Note: died in 2004)	Progressive Conservative	1999
Chester-St. Margaret's	**Judy Streatch** (2005)	Progressive Conservative	2005
Clare	Wayne Gaudet	Liberal	1993
Colchester-Musquodoboit Valley	**Brooke Taylor**	Progressive Conservative	1993
Colchester North	Bill Langille	Progressive Conservative	1999
Cole Harbour	Darrell Dexter	NDP	1998
Cole Harbour-Eastern Passage	Kevin Deveaux	NDP	1998
Cumberland North	Ernie Fage	Progressive Conservative	1997
Cumberland South	**Murray Scott**	Progressive Conservative	1998
Dartmouth East	Joan Massey	NDP	2003
Dartmouth North	Jerry Pye	NDP	1998
Dartmouth South-Portland Valley	Marilyn More	NDP	2003
Digby-Annapolis	Harold Theriault, Jr.	Liberal	2003
Eastern Shore	**Bill Dooks**	Progressive Conservative	1999
Glace Bay	David Wilson	Liberal	1999
Guysborough-Sheet Harbour	**Ron Chisholm**	Progressive Conservative	1999
Halifax Atlantic	Michèle Raymond	NDP	2003
Halifax Chebucto	Howard Epstein	NDP	1998
Halifax Citadel	Danny Graham (Note: resigned in 2005. A by-election was set, but was superseded by the 2006 general election.)	Liberal	2003
Halifax Clayton Park	Diana Whalen	Liberal	2003
Halifax Fairview	Graham Steele	NDP	2001
Halifax Needham	Maureen MacDonald	NDP	1998
Hammonds Plains-Upper Sackville	**Barry Barnet**	Progressive Conservative	1999
Hants East	John MacDonell	NDP	1998
Hants West	**Ron Russell**	Progressive Conservative	1978
Inverness	**Rodney MacDonald**	Progressive Conservative	1999
Kings North	Mark Parent	Progressive Conservative	1999
Kings South	**David Morse**	Progressive Conservative	1999
Kings West	Leo Glavine	Liberal	2003
Lunenburg	**Michael Baker**	Progressive Conservative	1998
Lunenburg West	**Carolyn Bolivar-Getson**	Progressive Conservative	2003
Pictou Centre	John Hamm	Progressive Conservative	1993
Pictou East	James DeWolfe	Progressive Conservative	1998
Pictou West	Charlie Parker	NDP	1998, 2003
Preston	Keith Colwell	Liberal	1993, (Note: Eastern Shore) 2003
Queens	**Kerry Morash**	Progressive Conservative	1999
Richmond	Michel Samson	Liberal	1998
Sackville-Cobequid	Dave Wilson	NDP	2003
Shelburne	Cecil O'Donnell	Progressive Conservative	1999
Timberlea-Prospect	Bill Estabrooks	NDP	1998
Truro-Bible Hill	**Jamie Muir**	Progressive Conservative	1998
Victoria-The Lakes	Gerald Sampson	Liberal	2003
Waverley-Fall River-Beaverbank	Gary Hines	Progressive Conservative	2003
Yarmouth	**Richard Hurlburt**	Progressive Conservative	1999

Note

- Premier in italics, ministers in **bold**.

== Seating plan ==
****	****	****	****	****	****	****	****	****	****
****	****	****	****	****	****	****	****	****	****
****	****	****	****	****	****	****	****	****	****	****	****
****
****
****
****	****	****	****	****	****	****	****	****	****	****	****	****
****	****	****	****	****	****	****	****	****	****	****
****	****	****	****	****	****	****	****

== Notes ==
Preceded by 58th General Assembly of Nova Scotia	General Assemblies of Nova Scotia; 2003–2006	Succeeded by 60th General Assembly of Nova Scotia
