= 60th General Assembly of Nova Scotia =

- Minority parliament
- June 29, 2006 – May 5, 2009

Parliament leaders
- Premier: Rodney MacDonald; February 24, 2006 – June 19, 2009
- Leader of the Opposition: Darrell Dexter; April 29, 2001 – June 19, 2009

Party caucuses
- Government: Progressive Conservative Party
- Opposition: New Democratic Party
- Recognized: Liberal Party

House of Assembly
- Speaker of the House: Cecil Clarke; March 3, 2006 – October 23, 2007
- Alfie MacLeod; October 25, 2007 – May 5, 2009
- Government House Leader: Michael Baker; June 29, 2006 – October 23, 2007
- Cecil Clarke; October 23, 2007 – May 5, 2009
- Opposition House Leader: Kevin Deveaux; September 4, 2003 – February 8, 2007
- Frank Corbett; February 8, 2007 – May 5, 2009
- Members: 52 MLA seats

Sovereign
- Monarch: Elizabeth II; February 6, 1952
- Lieutenant Governor: Myra Freeman; May 17, 2000 – September 7, 2006
- Mayann Francis; September 7, 2006

Sessions
- 1st session June 29, 2006 – November 22, 2007
- 2nd session November 22, 2007 – May 5, 2009
← 59th	→ 61st

60th General Assembly of Nova Scotia represented Nova Scotia from 2006 to 2009. Its membership was determined in the 2006 Nova Scotia election. The Progressive Conservative Party of Nova Scotia led by Rodney MacDonald formed a minority government.

The first session met from June 29, 2006 to July 14, 2006, October 30, 2006 to November 23, 2006, January 8, 2006 to January 11, 2006, March 19, 2007 to April 13, 2007 and October 27, 2007 to November 22, 2007.

The second session met from November 22, 2007 to December 13, 2007, April 24, 2008 to May 27, 2008, October 30, 2008 to November 25, 2008, and May 1, 2009 to May 5, 2009, when the government was defeated on a money bill.

== Division of seats ==
Affiliation	Members
Progressive Conservative Party	21
New Democratic Party	20
Liberal Party	9
Independent	1
Vacant	1
Total	52
Government majority (minority)	(1)

== List of members ==
Riding	Member	Party	First elected / previously elected
Annapolis	Stephen McNeil	Liberal	2003
Antigonish	Angus MacIsaac	Progressive Conservative	1969, (Note: Guysborough) 1999
Argyle	Chris d'Entremont	Progressive Conservative	2003
Bedford	Len Goucher	Progressive Conservative	2006
Cape Breton Centre	Frank Corbett	NDP	1998
Cape Breton North	Cecil Clarke	Progressive Conservative	2001
Cape Breton Nova	Gordie Gosse	NDP	2003
Cape Breton South	Manning MacDonald	Liberal	1993
Cape Breton West	Alfie MacLeod†	Progressive Conservative	1995, 2006
Chester-St. Margaret's	Judy Streatch	Progressive Conservative	2005
Clare	Wayne Gaudet	Liberal	1993
Colchester-Musquodoboit Valley	Brooke Taylor	Progressive Conservative	1993
Colchester North	Karen Casey	Progressive Conservative	2006
Cole Harbour	Darrell Dexter	NDP	1998
Cole Harbour-Eastern Passage	Kevin Deveaux	NDP	1998
Cole Harbour-Eastern Passage	Becky Kent(2007) (Note: elected in a by-election)	NDP	2007
Cumberland North	Ernie Fage (Note: resigned from cabinet and from the Progressive Conservative caucus in 2007)	Progressive Conservative	1997
Cumberland North	Ernie Fage	Independent Progressive Conservative	1997
Cumberland South	Murray Scott	Progressive Conservative	1998
Dartmouth East	Joan Massey	NDP	2003
Dartmouth North	Trevor Zinck	NDP	2006
Dartmouth South-Portland Valley	Marilyn More	NDP	2003
Digby-Annapolis	Harold Theriault	Liberal	2003
Eastern Shore	Bill Dooks	Progressive Conservative	1999
Glace Bay	David Wilson	Liberal	1999
Guysborough-Sheet Harbour	Ron Chisholm	Progressive Conservative	1999
Halifax Atlantic	Michèle Raymond	NDP	2003
Halifax Chebucto	Howard Epstein	NDP	1998
Halifax Citadel	Leonard Preyra	NDP	2006
Halifax Clayton Park	Diana Whalen	Liberal	2003
Halifax Fairview	Graham Steele	NDP	2001
Halifax Needham	Maureen MacDonald	NDP	1998
Hammonds Plains-Upper Sackville	Barry Barnet	Progressive Conservative	1999
Hants East	John MacDonell	NDP	1998
Hants West	Chuck Porter	Progressive Conservative	2006
Inverness	Rodney MacDonald	Progressive Conservative	1999
Kings North	Mark Parent	Progressive Conservative	1999
Kings South	David Morse	Progressive Conservative	1999
Kings West	Leo Glavine	Liberal	2003
Lunenburg	Michael Baker (Note: died in 2009)	Progressive Conservative	1998
Lunenburg West	Carolyn Bolivar-Getson	Progressive Conservative	2003
Pictou Centre	Pat Dunn	Progressive Conservative	2006
Pictou East	Clarrie MacKinnon	NDP	2006
Pictou West	Charlie Parker	NDP	1998, 2003
Preston	Keith Colwell	Liberal	1993, (Note: Eastern Shore) 2003
Queens	Vicki Conrad	NDP	2006
Richmond	Michel Samson	Liberal	1998
Sackville-Cobequid	Dave Wilson	NDP	2003
Shelburne	Sterling Belliveau	NDP	2006
Timberlea-Prospect	Bill Estabrooks	NDP	1998
Truro-Bible Hill	Jamie Muir	Progressive Conservative	1998
Victoria-The Lakes	Keith Bain	Progressive Conservative	2006
Waverley-Fall River-Beaverbank	Percy Paris	NDP	2006
Yarmouth	Richard Hurlburt	Progressive Conservative	1999

== Seating plan ==
****	****	Epstein	MacKinnon	Belliveau	Preyra	****	*	****	Samson	Theriault
Gosse	Estabrooks	Zinck	Raymond	Paris	Conrad	Wilson	More	*	Glavine	Wilson	Whalen
Parker	Massey	Steele	MacDonell	Corbett	MacDonald	DEXTER	Kent	*	MacDonald	MCNEIL	Gaudet	Colwell
****
MacLeod
****
****	Hurlburt	Morse	Barnet	MacIsaac	****	MACDONALD	Muir	d'Entremont	Bolivar-Getson	****	Fage
****	Clarke	Casey	Goucher	Parent	****	Streatch	Scott	Dooks	Taylor
****						Chisholm	Bain	Dunn	Porter

== Notes ==
Preceded by 59th General Assembly of Nova Scotia	General Assemblies of Nova Scotia; 2006–2009	Succeeded by 61st General Assembly of Nova Scotia
