= Nick Wright (politician) =

Canadian business lawyer and politician

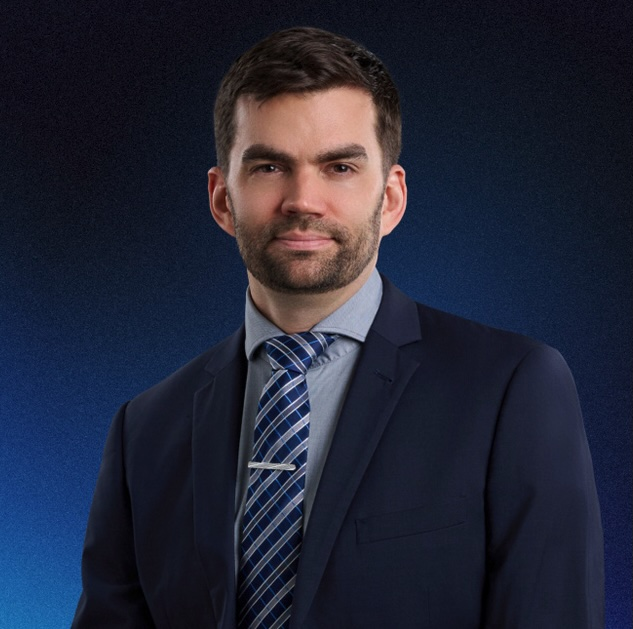
- Wright in October 2025

Leader of the Green Party of Nova Scotia
- In office March 2006 – May 2007
- Succeeded by: Ken McGowan

Personal details
- Born: Nicholas dePencier Wright; May 20, 1982 (age 44) Toronto, Ontario, Canada
- Party: Green
- Education: University of King's College; Dalhousie University
- Occupation: Politician; lawyer

Nicholas dePencier Wright (born May 20, 1982) is a Canadian business lawyer and former politician. He was the founding leader of the Green Party of Nova Scotia and was the founding Executive Director of the Canadian animal advocacy organization Animal Justice. He is currently founder and CEO of foreign affairs publication Geopolitical Monitor and was an elected member ("Bencher") of the governing body of the Law Society of Ontario (2019-2023).

== Background and education ==
Wright was born in Toronto, Ontario. He attended Lakefield College School before moving to Halifax, Nova Scotia, where he received an honours degree in philosophy from the University of King's College, Halifax and an MBA and a law degree from Dalhousie University. In 2017 he earned an LLM in tax law from Osgoode Hall Law School.

== Politics ==
On March 5, 2006, Wright became the leader of the Green Party of Nova Scotia at the Party's founding convention—after winning a contested nomination vote over long time Green Party of Canada candidate and organizer Sheila Richardson.

On December 19, 2006, Wright announced that he would be stepping down as leader of the Green Party of Nova Scotia upon the completion of his term, which ended in May 2007.

On May 1, 2019 Wright was elected 'Bencher' of the Law Society of Ontario as a representative for Toronto

=== Elections ===
In the 2006 federal election, Wright ran for the Green Party of Canada for the riding of Halifax and received 3.9% of the popular vote (1,948 votes), losing to NDP incumbent and former NDP federal and provincial leader Alexa McDonough.

Wright then led the Green Party of Nova Scotia through the 2006 Nova Scotia general election. He ran as a candidate for the district of Halifax Citadel and received 4.18% of the popular vote (292 votes), losing to NDP candidate Leonard Preyra.

On October 27, 2014, Wright ran for City Council in Toronto's Ward 20, losing to Joe Cressy.

On June 22, 2015, Wright was nominated Green Party of Canada candidate for Toronto's University—Rosedale for the 2015 federal election. In the election, Wright received 3% of the popular vote (1,423 votes), losing to Liberal candidate Chrystia Freeland.

On May 1, 2019, Wright successfully ran for 'Bencher' to become part of the governing body of the Law Society of Ontario as part of a slate that sought to depoliticize the organization and reduce spending and membership fees.

=== Post-elections ===
Wright practices business law in Toronto. He frequently appeared in the media for his work in support of animal protection and civil liberties.

== Electoral record ==
2015 Canadian federal election: University—Rosedale
Party	Candidate	Votes	%	±%	Expenditures
Liberal	Chrystia Freeland	27,849	49.80	+19.23	$185,406.36
New Democratic	Jennifer Hollett	15,988	28.59	−15.24	$142,562.73
Conservative	Karim Jivraj	9,790	17.51	−2.62	$83,600.78
Green	Nick Wright	1,641	2.93	−1.73	$19,152.70
Libertarian	Jesse Waslowski	233	0.42	–	$393.64
Animal Alliance	Simon Luisi	126	0.23	–	$153.10
Communist	Drew Garvie	125	0.22	–	–
Bridge	David Berlin	122	0.22	–	–
Marxist–Leninist	Steve Rutchinski	51	0.09	–	–
Total valid votes/expense limit		55,925	99.47		$206,261.82
Total rejected ballots		300	0.53	–	
Turnout		56,225	72.83	–	
Eligible voters		77,205			
Liberal notional gain from New Democratic		Swing		+17.23	
Source: Elections Canada

2014 Toronto City Council Election: Ward 20 Trinity—Spadina
Candidate	Vote	%
Joe Cressy	12,466	41.96
Terri Chu	3,693	12.43
Sarah Thomson	2,808	9.45
Mike Yen	1,431	4.82
Phillip Morrison	1,407	4.74
Anshul Kapoor	1,063	3.58
Charles MacDonald	972	3.27
Albert Koehl	853	2.87
Tonny Louie	740	2.49
Daryl Christhoff	705	2.37
Mike Andreae	590	1.99
Sam Goldstein	519	1.75
Nick Wright	395	1.33
Stephanie Carty-Kegel	376	1.27
Sam Novak	376	1.27
Graham Hollings	307	1.03
Stella Kargiannakis	286	0.96
Leanne Hicks	212	0.71
Susan Tsai	194	0.65
Michael Monaghan	128	0.43
Kat Shermack	102	0.34
Akeem Fasasi	86	0.29

2006 Nova Scotia general election: Halifax Citadel
Party	Candidate	Votes	%	±%
New Democratic	Leonard Preyra	3,054	42.03%	10.83%
Progressive Conservative	Bill Black	2,724	37.49%	7.22%
Liberal	Devin Maxwell	1,181	16.25%	-21.09%
Green	Nick Wright	307	4.23%	–
Total		7,266	–	
Source(s) Source: Nova Scotia Legislature (2021). "Electoral History for Halifax Citadel-Sable Island" (PDF). nslegislature.ca.

2006 Canadian federal election: Halifax
Party	Candidate	Votes	%	±%	Expenditures
New Democratic	Alexa McDonough	23,420	46.88	+5.33	$67,353.61
Liberal	Martin MacKinnon	15,437	30.90	-8.21	$62,643.27
Conservative	Andrew House	8,992	18.00	+3.37	$73,744.64
Green	Nick Wright	1,948	3.90	-0.81	$861.16
Marxist–Leninist	Tony Seed	164	0.33	–	none listed
Total valid votes/expense limit		49,961	100.0		$77,542
Total rejected, unmarked and declined ballots		210	0.42	-0.17	
Turnout		50,171	65.25		
Eligible voters		76,885			
New Democratic hold		Swing		+6.77	

Preceded by None	Leader of the Green Party of Nova Scotia; 2006-2007	Succeeded by Ken McGowan
