= 59th Nova Scotia general election =

The 59th Nova Scotia general election may refer to

- the 2003 Nova Scotia general election, the 58th overall general election for Nova Scotia, for the (due to a counting error in 1859) 59th General Assembly of Nova Scotia, or
- the 2006 Nova Scotia general election, the 59th overall general election for Nova Scotia, for the 60th General Assembly of Nova Scotia, but considered the 37th general election for the Canadian province of Nova Scotia.
