= Labi Kousoulis =

Canadian politician

The Honourable Labi Kousoulis ECNS
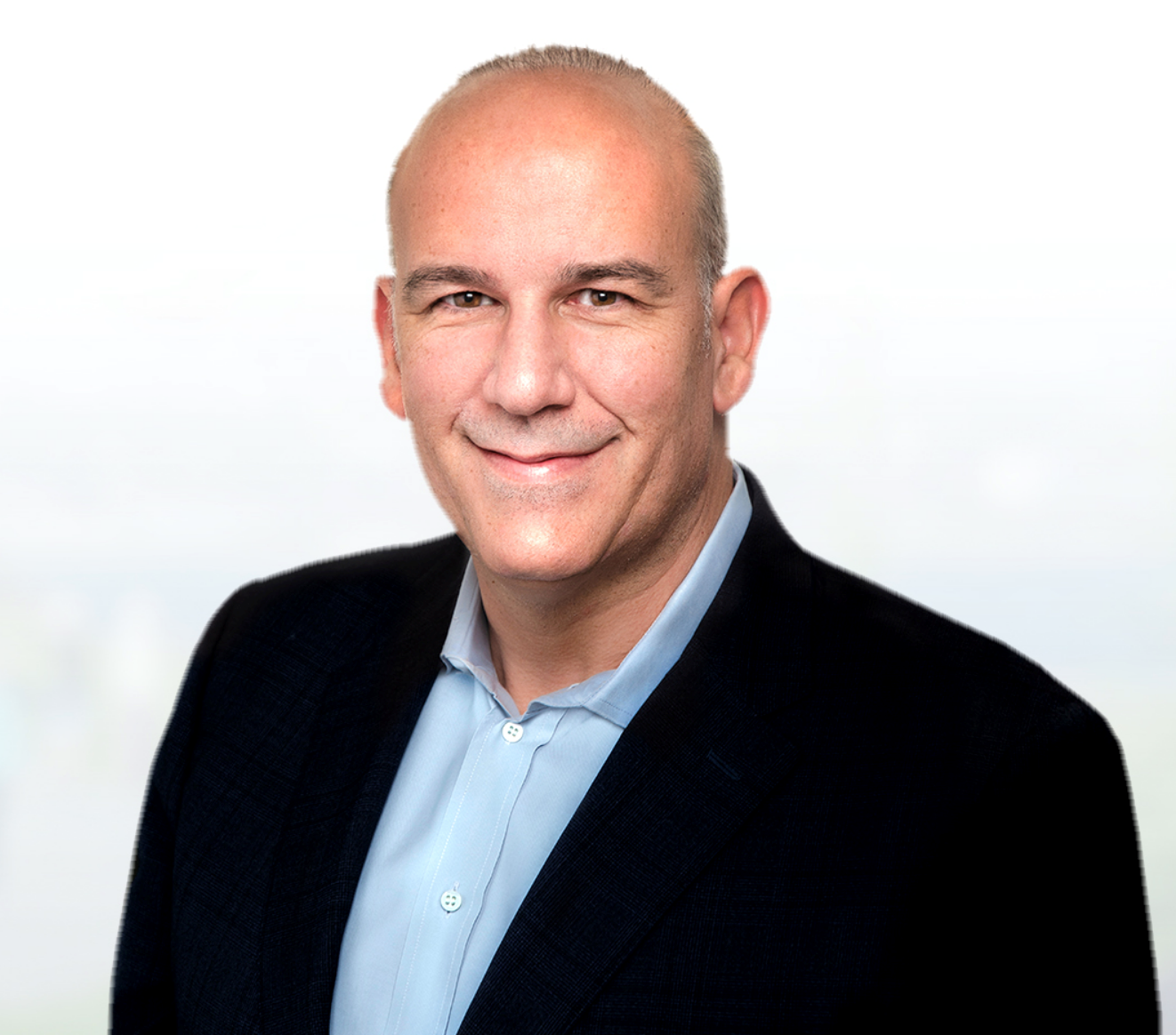

Member of the Nova Scotia House of Assembly for Halifax Citadel-Sable Island
- In office October 8, 2013 – July 17, 2021
- Preceded by: Leonard Preyra
- Succeeded by: Lisa Lachance

Minister of the Public Service Commission
- In office October 22, 2013 – April 1, 2014
- Premier: Stephen McNeil
- Preceded by: Marilyn More
- Succeeded by: Tony Ince

Minister of Internal Services
- In office April 1, 2014 – June 5, 2017
- Premier: Stephen McNeil
- Preceded by: Ministry Established
- Succeeded by: Patricia Arab

Minister of Labour and Advanced Education
- In office June 5, 2017 – September 30, 2020
- Premier: Stephen McNeil
- Preceded by: Kelly Regan

Member of Treasury and Policy Board
- In office October 22, 2013 – September 30, 2020
- Premier: Stephen McNeil

Personal details
- Born: 1971 Halifax, Nova Scotia
- Party: Liberal
- Website: Official website

Labi Kousoulis (born 1971) is a Canadian politician, who was elected to the Nova Scotia House of Assembly in the 2013 provincial election. A member of the Nova Scotia Liberal Party, he represented the electoral district of Halifax Citadel-Sable Island until his defeat in the 2021 Nova Scotia general election.

== Early life and education ==
Kousoulis was born and raised in Halifax, Nova Scotia, the son of John Kousoulis and Marina Michalakos, who emigrated from Laconia in Southern Greece though Pier 21. He graduated from Saint Mary's University in 1996 with a Bachelor of Commerce in Finance and is a Chartered Professional Accountant. He holds a Master in Business Administration from Saint Mary's University Sobey School of Business.

== Before politics ==
He worked as a commercial lender with Scotiabank, as an executive member of Wilsons Fuel, and as controller at Trenton Works. Kousoulis has also started a number of small businesses.

== Political career ==
On October 22, 2013, Kousoulis was appointed to the Executive Council of Nova Scotia where he served as Minister of the Public Service Commission, as well as being appointed Minister of Information Management and Minister of the Voluntary Sector. On April 1, 2014, he was appointed Minister of Internal Services, a new department including the responsibilities of the former Information Management portfolio, as well as various other support functions within government.

Kousoulis was re-elected in the 2017 election. On June 15, 2017, premier Stephen McNeil shuffled his cabinet, moving Kousoulis to Minister of Labour and Advanced Education. Kousoulis has been a member of the Treasury and Policy Board since his appointment to the Executive Council of Nova Scotia in 2013.

On February 23, 2021, Kousoulis was appointed as the Minister of Finance and Treasury Board, Minister of Inclusive Economic Growth (Formerly Business) and Minister of Trade.

=== 2021 leadership campaign ===
On September 30, 2020, Kousoulis announced his candidacy for the leader of the Liberal Party of Nova Scotia and to become the province's 29th premier, following Stephen McNeil's announcement that he would be stepping down from his office. He placed second in the election, behind Iain Rankin. Kousoulis would also lose his seat in the general election held later in 2021.

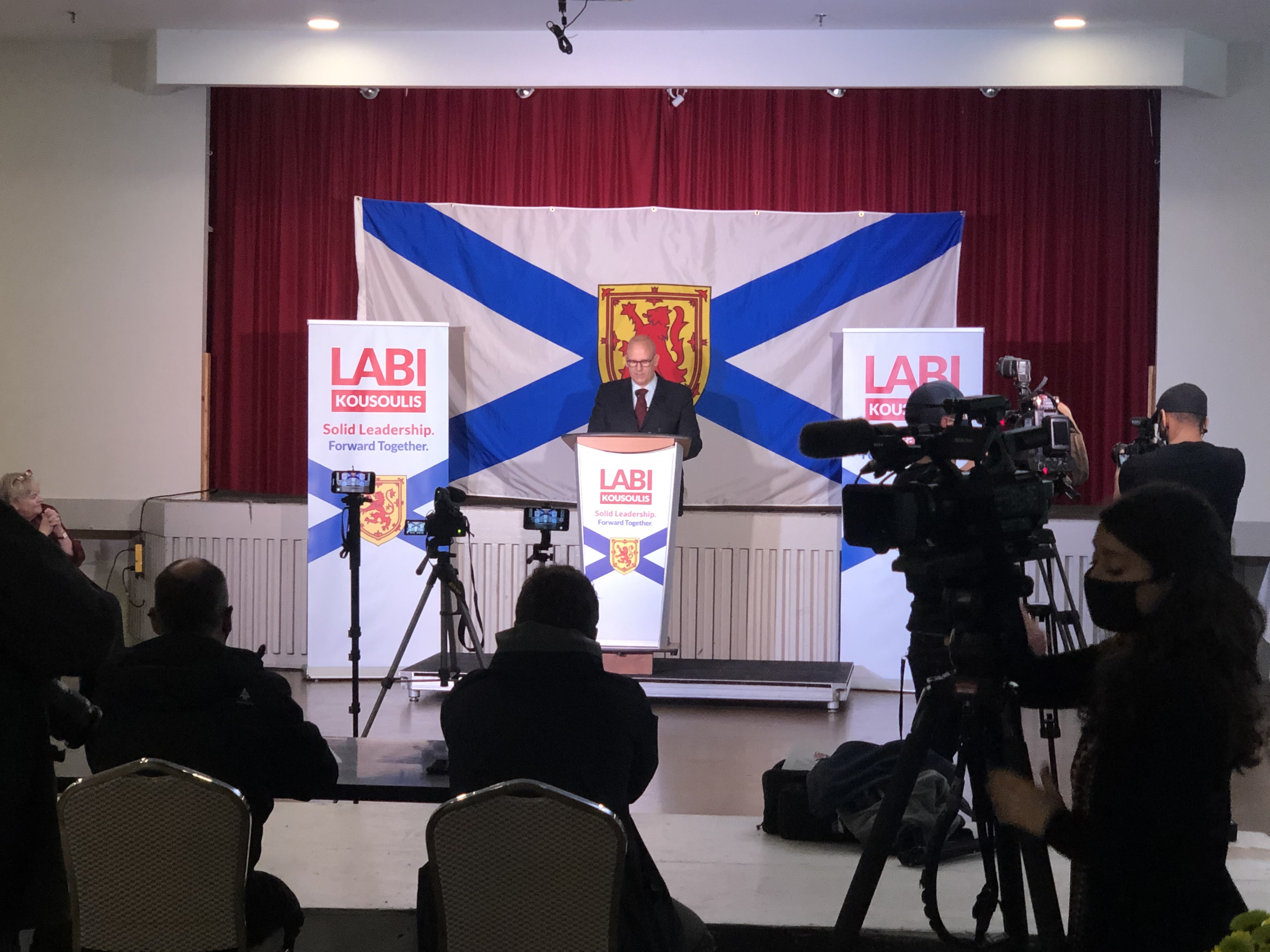
Labi Kousoulis announces Liberal Leadership Campaign.

== Electoral record ==
2021 Nova Scotia general election
Party	Candidate	Votes	%	±%
New Democratic	Lisa Lachance	3,397	42.31	+12.55
Liberal	Labi Kousoulis	2,956	36.82	-4.74
Progressive Conservative	Sheri Morgan	1,425	17.75	-5.48
Green	Noah Hollis	250	3.11	-2.33
Total valid votes		8,028	99.79	
Total rejected ballots		17	0.21	
Turnout		8,045	48.92	
Eligible voters		16,444		
New Democratic gain from Liberal		Swing		+8.65
Source: Elections Nova Scotia

2017 Nova Scotia general election
Party	Candidate	Votes	%	±%
Liberal	Labi Kousoulis	2,419	41%	
New Democratic	Glenn Walton	1,618	28%	
Progressive Conservative	Rob Batherson	1,480	25%	
Green	Martin Willison	343	6%	
Total valid votes		5860	100.0	

#DCDCDC

2013 Nova Scotia general election
Party		Candidate	Votes	%	±%
	Liberal	Labi Kousoulis	2,966	47.66	
	New Democratic Party	Leonard Preyra	1,934	31.08	
	Progressive Conservative	Andrew Black	1,094	17.58	
	Green	Brynn Horley	198	3.18	
Independent (Atlantica)	Frederic Boileau-Cadieux	31	0.50		
