= Cecil O'Donnell =

Canadian politician

Member of the Nova Scotia House of Assembly for Shelburne
- In office 1999–2006
- Preceded by: Clifford Huskilson
- Succeeded by: Sterling Belliveau

Personal details
- Born: June 10, 1944 (age 81) East Jeddore, Nova Scotia, Canada
- Party: Progressive Conservative

Cecil Edward O'Donnell (born June 10, 1944) is a Canadian politician. He represented the electoral district of Shelburne in the Nova Scotia House of Assembly from 1999 to 2006. He was a member of the Progressive Conservatives.

== Early life ==
O'Donnell was born in 1944 at East Jeddore, Nova Scotia.

== Political career ==
He served as a municipal councillor and then warden for the Municipality of the District of Barrington. O'Donnell first attempted to enter provincial politics in the 1998 election, but lost to Liberal incumbent Clifford Huskilson by 309 votes. He ran again in 1999, but election night returns had O'Donnell losing to Huskilson by one vote. A judicial recount was held on August 17 resulting in a tie which was broken when the ridings returning officer picked O'Donnell's name from a box.

A backbench member of John Hamm's government, O'Donnell broke party ranks in June 2001 to vote against Bill 68, the government's anti-strike legislation. The law ended the right to strike for health-care workers and gave cabinet the power to impose a wage settlement on nurses. O'Donnell voted the way he believed "the majority of people in Shelburne County would want." He was later replaced as head of the Community Services Committee, which the opposition Liberals said was a result of voting against the government. On February 17, 2003, O'Donnell announced that he would not reoffer as a Progressive Conservative candidate in the next election, but that he was considering seeking re-election as an independent. On April 8, after re-thinking his decision at the request of Hamm, O'Donnell announced he would re-offer for the Tories after all.

In the 2003 election, O'Donnell faced a challenge from former MLA Clifford Huskilson, but was re-elected by almost 600 votes. In the 2006 Progressive Conservative leadership race, O'Donnell was a supporter of Rodney MacDonald, and was named caucus whip shortly after MacDonald took over as premier in February 2006. On May 1, 2006, O'Donnell announced he was leaving politics and would not be running in the 2006 election.

O'Donnell returned to municipal politics in 2008 when he was elected a councillor in the Municipality of Barrington. He was defeated when he ran for re-election in 2012.

== Personal life ==
He married Christina Marie O'Donnell, and was the owner of a local grocery store.
