= Lisa Lachance =

Canadian politician

Lisa Lachance MLA

Critic, Finance and Treasury Board; Mental Health & Addictions; 2SLGBTQ+ Affairs; L’nu Affairs; Agriculture; Acadian Affairs; Advanced Education; and Communications NS.
- Incumbent
- Assumed office September 7, 2021
- Leader: Gary Burrill and Claudia Chender

Member of the Nova Scotia House of Assembly for Halifax Citadel-Sable Island
- Incumbent
- Assumed office August 17, 2021
- Preceded by: Labi Kousoulis

Personal details
- Born: Montreal, Quebec, Canada
- Party: New Democratic Party
- Spouse: Heather Gass
- Education: Dalhousie University

Lisa Anne Lachance MLA is a Canadian politician who was elected to the Nova Scotia House of Assembly in the 2021 Nova Scotia general election and re-elected in the 2024 Nova Scotia general election. She represents the riding of Halifax Citadel-Sable Island as a member of the Nova Scotia New Democratic Party.

As of August 2025, Lachance serves as the Official Opposition critic for Finance, Environment, Mental Health and Addictions, 2SLGBTQIA+ Affairs, Acadian Affairs, and Natural Resources. Lachance also serves as the New Democrat House Leader.

In 2026, Lachance endorsed Tanille Johnston in that year's federal NDP leadership race.

== Early life ==
Lachance was born in Montreal, and spent time in Belleville, Ontario and Australia, before completing high school in Canning, Nova Scotia. Lachance graduated from Dalhousie University in 1996 with a Bachelor of Arts in International Development Studies and in 2000 with a Master of Public Administration.

== Personal life ==
Lachance and her partner Heather Gass were one of the first same-sex couples to be legally married in Canada following Halpern v Canada (AG). Lachance is genderqueer and uses she/they pronouns. She is the first gender non-conforming MLA in Nova Scotia, and the third overall in the nation, joining Uzoma Asagwara and Estefan Cortes-Vargas.

== Electoral history ==
2024 Nova Scotia general election: Halifax Citadel-Sable Island
Party	Candidate	Votes	%	±%	Expenditures
New Democratic	Lisa Lachance	3,903	52.67	+10.36	$55,869.00
Progressive Conservative	Eleanor Humphries	1,908	25.75	+8.00	$36,029.47
Liberal	Rob Grace	1,440	19.43	-17.39	$44,395.80
Green	Karen Beazley	159	2.15	-0.97	$0
Total valid votes		7,410	100%		
Total rejected ballots		20			
Turnout		7,430	41.7%		
Eligible voters		17,805			
New Democratic hold		Swing			
Source: Elections Nova Scotia

2021 Nova Scotia general election: Halifax Citadel-Sable Island
Party	Candidate	Votes	%	±%	Expenditures
New Democratic	Lisa Lachance	3,397	42.31	+12.55	$42,325.05
Liberal	Labi Kousoulis	2,956	36.82	-4.74	$76,524.21
Progressive Conservative	Sheri Morgan	1,425	17.75	-5.48	$78,619.59
Green	Noah Hollis	250	3.11	-2.33	$3,156.19
Total valid votes/expense limit		8,028	99.79	–	$95,751.07
Total rejected ballots		17	0.21		
Turnout		8,045	48.92		
Eligible voters		16,444			
New Democratic gain from Liberal		Swing		+8.65	
Source: Elections Nova Scotia

2021 Nova Scotia general election: Halifax Citadel-Sable Island
Party	Candidate	Votes	%	±%
New Democratic	Lisa Lachance	3,397	42.31	+12.55
Liberal	Labi Kousoulis	2,956	36.82	-4.74
Progressive Conservative	Sheri Morgan	1,425	17.75	-5.48
Green	Noah Hollis	250	3.11	-2.33
Total valid votes		8,028	99.79	
Total rejected ballots		17	0.21	
Turnout		8,045	48.92	
Eligible voters		16,444		
New Democratic gain from Liberal		Swing		+8.65
