= 60th Nova Scotia general election =

The 60th Nova Scotia general election may refer to

- 2006 Nova Scotia general election, the 59th overall general election for Nova Scotia, for the (due to a counting error in 1859) 60th General Assembly of Nova Scotia
- 2009 Nova Scotia general election, the 60th overall general election for Nova Scotia, for the 61st General Assembly of Nova Scotia
