= List of political parties in Nova Scotia =

This is a list of political parties in the Canadian province of Nova Scotia.

== Parties represented in the House of Assembly ==
Name	Founded	Ideology	Membership	Leader	MLAs
Progressive Conservative Association	1867	Progressive Conservatism	11,579 (2018)	Tim Houston	43 / 56
New Democratic Party	1961	Social democracy	3,595 (2017)	Claudia Chender	9 / 56
Liberal Party	1883	Liberalism	~16,000 (2021)	Becky Druhan	3 / 56

== Other registered parties ==
Name	Founded	Ideology	Membership	Leader
Green Party of Nova Scotia	2006	Green politics	<300 (2021)	Anthony Edmonds

== Historical parties ==
- Anti-Confederation Party
- Atlantica Party (2005–2024)
- Cape Breton Labour Party (1982–1984)
- Confederation Party
- Labour Party
- Marijuana Party
- Nova Scotia Party (1997–2005)
- Nova Scotians United (2021–2024)
- United Farmers of Nova Scotia (1920–1925)
