= Ed Kinley =

Canadian politician

Ed Kinley ONS

MLA for Halifax Citadel
- In office November 4, 1997 – March 24, 1998
- Preceded by: Terry Donahoe
- Succeeded by: Peter Delefes

Personal details
- Born: January 16, 1932 Halifax, Nova Scotia
- Died: January 19, 2015 (aged 83) Halifax, Nova Scotia
- Party: Liberal
- Occupation: surgeon

Cecil Edwin Kinley ONS (January 16, 1932 – January 19, 2015) was a Canadian politician and heart surgeon. He represented the electoral district of Halifax Citadel in the Nova Scotia House of Assembly from November 1997 to March 1998. He was a member of the Nova Scotia Liberal Party.

== Early life and career ==
Born in 1932 in Halifax, Nova Scotia, Kinley graduated with a medical degree from Dalhousie University in 1956. He married Sara Jane Hawk. In 1963, Kinley joined the Dalhousie Surgery Department, where he practiced until 1998. Considered to be a pioneer in the cardiovascular surgery field, Kinley performed the first adult open heart surgery and coronary bypass in Nova Scotia. Kinley started the cardiac surgery program at the IWK Children's Hospital and adult cardiac surgery at the Victoria General Hospital. He also established the first cardiac intensive care unit in Atlantic Canada, and implanted the first pacemaker in Atlantic Canada live on CBC Television.

== Political career ==
Kinley entered provincial politics in 1997, running as the Liberal candidate in a byelection for the Halifax Citadel riding. On November 4, 1997, he defeated NDP candidate Peter Delefes by 165 votes to win the byelection. In the 1998 election, initial results had Kinley losing to Delefes by 125 votes. However, there was some confusion over the calculation of poll results and Delefes' margin of victory was reduced to 40 when official results were announced. A judicial recount was held on April 14, and Delefes was officially declared elected by 37 votes.

Kinley ran again in the 1999 election, but finished third as Progressive Conservative Jane Purves won the seat, defeating Delefes by 434 votes. In April 2000, Kinley was elected president of the Nova Scotia Liberal Party.

== Later life ==
Following his political career, Kinley continued to assist during major surgeries, while performing some smaller surgeries until his retirement at age 76. In 2013, Kinley was a recipient of the Order of Nova Scotia.

Kinley died on January 19, 2015.
