= Halifax Citadel-Sable Island =

Provincial electoral district in Nova Scotia, Canada

Coordinates: 44.636°N 63.578°W

Nova Scotia electoral district

Provincial electoral district
- Legislature: Nova Scotia House of Assembly
MLA
Lisa Lachance
New Democratic
- District created: 1933
- Last contested: 2024

Demographics
- Population (2016): 22,106
- Electors: 14,968
- Area (km²): 38.00
- Pop. density (per km²): 581.7
- Census division: Halifax Regional Municipality

Halifax Citadel-Sable Island is a provincial electoral district in Halifax, Nova Scotia, Canada, that elects one member of the Nova Scotia House of Assembly. Its current Member of the Legislative Assembly is Lisa Lachance of the Nova Scotia New Democratic Party.

The constituency consists of the downtown city centre of Halifax and the residential South End. The regional district's area includes four universities (including Dalhousie University and Saint Mary's University) and four hospitals. The constituency also includes Sable Island. The remaining area of South End, Halifax is 7 km^{2}, and Sable Island is 31 km^{2}.

== Statistics ==
- Population (2016): 22,106
- Halifax Citadel: 7.00 km^{2} (3 sq mi)
- Sable Island: 31.00 km^{2} (12 sq mi)
- Halifax Citadel Population Density: 3,158/km^{2}

== History ==
From 1978 to 1997, a Progressive Conservative seat, Halifax Citadel has since become a major battleground between all three major parties. The seat changed hands in each of the five elections between the 1997 by-election and the 2006 general election and has been won by each major party within the last four elections.

In 1993, the name of the riding was changed from Halifax Cornwallis to Halifax Citadel.

On October 7, 2005, following the resignation of Liberal member Danny Graham, the seat became vacant. A by-election was called for June 27, 2006. That then became void when the 2006 general election was called for June 13, 2006.

In what was one of the most watched ridings during the 2006 provincial election, NDP candidate Leonard Preyra came out in front of former Progressive Conservative leadership candidate Bill Black.

On May 27, 2008, the name of the riding was changed from Halifax Citadel to Halifax Citadel-Sable Island.

== Members of the Legislative Assembly ==
This riding has elected the following members of the Legislative Assembly:

| Legislature | Years | Member | Party |
|---|---|---|---|
Halifax Centre; Riding created from Halifax
| 40th | 1933–1937 | Guy Murray Logan | Liberal |
| 41st | 1937–1939 | William Duff Forrest | Liberal |
| 41st | 1939–1941 | James Edward Rutledge | Liberal |
| 42nd | 1941–1945 | James Edward Rutledge | Liberal |
| 43rd | 1945–1949 | James Edward Rutledge | Liberal |
| 44th | 1949–1953 | James Edward Rutledge | Liberal |
| 45th | 1953–1956 | James Edward Rutledge | Liberal |
| 46th | 1956–1960 | Gordon S. Cowan | Liberal |
| 47th | 1960–1963 | Donald MacKeen Smith | Progressive Conservative |
| 48th | 1963–1967 | Donald MacKeen Smith | Progressive Conservative |
Halifax Citadel
| 49th | 1967–1970 | Donald MacKeen Smith | Progressive Conservative |
| 50th | 1970–1974 | Ronald Wallace | Liberal |
| 51st | 1974–1978 | Ronald Wallace | Liberal |
| 52nd | 1978–1981 | Arthur R. Donahoe | Progressive Conservative |
| 53rd | 1981–1984 | Arthur R. Donahoe | Progressive Conservative |
| 54th | 1984–1988 | Arthur R. Donahoe | Progressive Conservative |
| 55th | 1988–1993 | Arthur R. Donahoe | Progressive Conservative |
| 56th | 1993–1997 | Terry Donahoe | Progressive Conservative |
| 56th | 1997–1998 | Ed Kinley | Liberal |
| 57th | 1998–1999 | Peter Delefes | New Democratic |
| 58th | 1999–2003 | Jane Purves | Progressive Conservative |
| 59th | 2003–2005 | Danny Graham | Liberal |
| 60th | 2006–2009 | Leonard Preyra | New Democratic |
Halifax Citadel-Sable Island
| 61st | 2009–2013 | Leonard Preyra | New Democratic |
| 62nd | 2013–2017 | Labi Kousoulis | Liberal |
| 63rd | 2017–2021 | Labi Kousoulis | Liberal |
| 64th | 2021–present | Lisa Lachance | New Democratic |

== Election results ==
=== 2024 ===
2024 Nova Scotia general election
| Party | Candidate | Votes | % | ±% | Expenditures |
|---|---|---|---|---|---|
| New Democratic | Lisa Lachance | 3,903 | 52.67 | +10.36 | $55,869.00 |
| Progressive Conservative | Eleanor Humphries | 1,908 | 25.75 | +8.00 | $36,029.47 |
| Liberal | Rob Grace | 1,440 | 19.43 | -17.39 | $44,395.80 |
| Green | Karen Beazley | 159 | 2.15 | -0.97 | $0 |
| Total valid votes | | 7,410 | 100% | | |
| Total rejected ballots | | 20 | | | |
| Turnout | | 7,430 | 41.7% | | |
| Eligible voters | | 17,805 | | | |
| New Democratic hold | | Swing | | | |
Source: Elections Nova Scotia

=== 2021 ===
2021 Nova Scotia general election
| Party | Candidate | Votes | % | ±% | Expenditures |
|---|---|---|---|---|---|
| New Democratic | Lisa Lachance | 3,397 | 42.31 | +12.55 | $42,325.05 |
| Liberal | Labi Kousoulis | 2,956 | 36.82 | -4.74 | $76,524.21 |
| Progressive Conservative | Sheri Morgan | 1,425 | 17.75 | -5.48 | $78,619.59 |
| Green | Noah Hollis | 250 | 3.11 | -2.33 | $3,156.19 |
| Total valid votes/expense limit | | 8,028 | 99.79 | – | $95,751.07 |
| Total rejected ballots | | 17 | 0.21 | | |
| Turnout | | 8,045 | 48.92 | | |
| Eligible voters | | 16,444 | | | |
| New Democratic gain from Liberal | | Swing | | +8.65 | |
Source: Elections Nova Scotia

=== 2017 ===
2017 provincial election redistributed results
| Party | Vote | % |
|---|---|---|
| Liberal | 2,873 | 41.57 |
| New Democratic | 2,057 | 29.76 |
| Progressive Conservative | 1,606 | 23.23 |
| Green | 376 | 5.44 |

Data from Electoral History for Halifax Citadel-Sable Island

2017 Nova Scotia general election
| Party | Candidate | Votes | % | ±% |
|---|---|---|---|---|
| Liberal | Labi Kousoulis | 2,419 | 41.28 | -6.38 |
| New Democratic | Glenn Walton | 1,618 | 27.61 | -3.47 |
| Progressive Conservative | Rob Batherson | 1,480 | 25.26 | +7.68 |
| Green | Martin Willison | 343 | 5.85 | +2.67 |
| Total valid votes | | 5,860 | 100 | |
| Total rejected ballots | | 29 | 0.49 | |
| Turnout | | 5,889 | 39.3 | |
| Eligible voters | | 14,910 | | |
| Liberal hold | | Swing | | -1.46 |
Source: Elections Nova Scotia

=== 2013 ===
2013 Nova Scotia general election
| Party | Candidate | Votes | % | ±% |
|---|---|---|---|---|
| Liberal | Labi Kousoulis | 2,966 | 47.66 | 14.09 |
| New Democratic | Leonard Preyra | 1,934 | 31.08 | -18.09 |
| Progressive Conservative | Andrew D. Black | 1,094 | 17.58 | 4.59 |
| Green | Brynn M. Horley | 198 | 3.18 | -1.09 |
| Independent (Atlantica) | Frederic Boileau-Cadieux | 31 | 0.50 | – |
| Total | | 6,223 | – | |
Source(s) Source: Nova Scotia Legislature (2024). "Electoral History for Halifax Citadel (1967)" (PDF). nslegislature.ca. Nova Scotia, Chief Electoral Officer (2013). 39th Provincial General Election, October 8, 2013: Volume 1 – Statement of Votes & Statistics (PDF) (Report). Elections Nova Scotia. Archived from the original (PDF) on April 10, 2018.

=== 2009 ===
2009 Nova Scotia general election
| Party | Candidate | Votes | % | ±% |
|---|---|---|---|---|
| New Democratic | Leonard Preyra | 3,785 | 49.17 | – |
| Liberal | Gerry Walsh | 2,584 | 33.57 | – |
| Progressive Conservative | Ted Larsen | 1,000 | 12.99 | – |
| Green | Ryan Watson | 329 | 4.27 | – |
| Total | | 7,698 | – | |
Source(s) Source: Nova Scotia Legislature (2024). "Electoral History for Halifax Citadel (1967)" (PDF). nslegislature.ca.

=== 2006 ===
2006 Nova Scotia general election: Halifax Citadel
| Party | Candidate | Votes | % | ±% |
|---|---|---|---|---|
| New Democratic | Leonard Preyra | 2,932 | 41.10 | 9.90 |
| Progressive Conservative | Bill Black | 2,721 | 38.14 | 7.87 |
| Liberal | Devin Maxwell | 1,182 | 16.57 | -20.77 |
| Green | Nick Wright | 299 | 4.19 | – |
| Total | | 7,134 | – | |
Source(s) Source: Nova Scotia Legislature (2024). "Electoral History for Halifax Citadel (1967)" (PDF). nslegislature.ca.

=== 2003 ===
2003 Nova Scotia general election: Halifax Citadel
| Party | Candidate | Votes | % | ±% |
|---|---|---|---|---|
| Liberal | Danny Graham | 3,042 | 37.34 | 7.46 |
| New Democratic | Peter Delefes | 2,542 | 31.20 | -0.91 |
| Progressive Conservative | Jane Purves | 2,466 | 30.27 | -6.56 |
| Marijuana | Michael R. Patriquen | 59 | 0.72 | – |
| Nova Scotia Party | James A. C. Marchione | 38 | 0.47 | -0.10 |
| Total | | 8,147 | – | |
Source(s) Source: Nova Scotia Legislature (2024). "Electoral History for Halifax Citadel (1967)" (PDF). nslegislature.ca.

=== 1999 ===
1999 Nova Scotia general election: Halifax Citadel
| Party | Candidate | Votes | % | ±% |
|---|---|---|---|---|
| Progressive Conservative | Jane Purves | 3,392 | 36.83 | 17.18 |
| New Democratic | Peter Delefes | 2,958 | 32.11 | -7.75 |
| Liberal | Ed Kinley | 2,752 | 29.88 | -9.65 |
| Independent | Arthur Canning | 57 | 0.62 | -0.34 |
| Nova Scotia Party | Grace Patterson | 52 | 0.56 | – |
| Total | | 9,211 | – | |
Source(s) Source: Nova Scotia Legislature (2024). "Electoral History for Halifax Citadel (1967)" (PDF). nslegislature.ca. Nova Scotia, Chief Electoral Officer (1999). Returns of the General Election for the House of Assembly, Thirty-Fifth General Election (Report). Elections Nova Scotia.

=== 1998 ===
1998 Nova Scotia general election: Halifax Citadel
| Party | Candidate | Votes | % | ±% |
|---|---|---|---|---|
| New Democratic | Peter Delefes | 4,414 | 39.87 | 3.60 |
| Liberal | Ed Kinley | 4,377 | 39.53 | 0.99 |
| Progressive Conservative | Tara Erskine | 2,175 | 19.64 | -4.67 |
| Independent | Arthur Canning | 106 | 0.96 | – |
| Total | | 11,072 | – | |
Source(s) Source: Nova Scotia Legislature (2024). "Electoral History for Halifax Citadel (1967)" (PDF). nslegislature.ca.

=== 1997 by-election ===
Nova Scotia provincial by-election, 1997-11-04: Halifax Citadel Resignation of Terry Donahoe
| Party | Candidate | Votes | % | ±% |
|---|---|---|---|---|
| Liberal | Ed Kinley | 2,795 | 38.55 | -0.01 |
| New Democratic | Peter Delefes | 2,630 | 36.27 | 15.45 |
| Progressive Conservative | Kate Carmichael | 1,763 | 24.31 | -14.92 |
| Independent | Idris Madar | 63 | 0.87 | – |
| Total | | 7,251 | – | |
Source(s) Source: Nova Scotia Legislature (2024). "Electoral History for Halifax Citadel (1967)" (PDF). nslegislature.ca.By-Election Returns 1997 (PDF) (Report). Elections Nova Scotia. 1997. Archived from the original (PDF) on August 7, 2021.

=== 1993 ===
1993 Nova Scotia general election: Halifax Citadel
| Party | Candidate | Votes | % | ±% |
|---|---|---|---|---|
| Progressive Conservative | Terry Donahoe | 4,584 | 39.23 | 4.12 |
| Liberal | Liz Crocker | 4,505 | 38.55 | 7.73 |
| New Democratic | Mary Sparling | 2,433 | 20.82 | -11.87 |
| Independent | Jan Morrison | 85 | 0.73 | – |
| Natural Law | Giles Bigras | 78 | 0.67 | – |
| Total | | 11,685 | – | |
Source(s) Source: Nova Scotia Legislature (2024). "Electoral History for Halifax Citadel (1967)" (PDF). nslegislature.ca. Nova Scotia, Chief Electoral Officer (1993). Returns of the General Election for the House of Assembly, Thirty-Third General Election (PDF) (Report). Queen's Printer. Archived from the original (PDF) on June 18, 2018.

=== 1988 ===
1988 Nova Scotia general election: Halifax Citadel
| Party | Candidate | Votes | % | ±% |
|---|---|---|---|---|
| Progressive Conservative | Art Donahoe | 3,283 | 35.11 | -5.29 |
| New Democratic | Eileen O'Connell | 3,057 | 32.70 | 1.01 |
| Liberal | Jay Abbass | 2,882 | 30.82 | 2.90 |
| Independent | Frank J. Fawson | 128 | 1.37 | – |
| Total | | 9,350 | – | |
Source(s) Source: Nova Scotia Legislature (2024). "Electoral History for Halifax Citadel (1967)" (PDF). nslegislature.ca. Nova Scotia, Chief Electoral Officer (1988). Returns of the General Election for the House of Assembly, Thirty-Second General Election (PDF) (Report). Queen's Printer. Archived from the original (PDF) on July 7, 2018.

=== 1984 ===
1984 Nova Scotia general election: Halifax Citadel
| Party | Candidate | Votes | % | ±% |
|---|---|---|---|---|
| Progressive Conservative | Art Donahoe | 3,652 | 40.40 | -4.15 |
| New Democratic | Eileen O'Connell | 2,864 | 31.68 | 5.16 |
| Liberal | John Godfrey | 2,524 | 27.92 | -1.02 |
| Total | | 9,040 | – | |
Source(s) Source: Nova Scotia Legislature (2024). "Electoral History for Halifax Citadel (1967)" (PDF). nslegislature.ca. Nova Scotia, Chief Electoral Officer (1984). Returns of the General Election for the House of Assembly, Thirty-First General Election (PDF) (Report). Queen's Printer. Archived from the original (PDF) on July 31, 2017.

=== 1981 ===
1981 Nova Scotia general election: Halifax Citadel
| Party | Candidate | Votes | % | ±% |
|---|---|---|---|---|
| Progressive Conservative | Art Donahoe | 4,141 | 44.55 | 3.99 |
| Liberal | Brenda Shannon | 2,690 | 28.94 | -8.88 |
| New Democratic | Tom Sinclair-Faulkner | 2,465 | 26.52 | 4.90 |
| Total | | 9,296 | – | |
Source(s) Source: Nova Scotia Legislature (2024). "Electoral History for Halifax Citadel (1967)" (PDF). nslegislature.ca. Nova Scotia, Chief Electoral Officer (1981). Returns of the General Election for the House of Assembly, Thirtieth General Election (PDF) (Report). Queen's Printer. Archived from the original (PDF) on July 31, 2017.

=== 1978 ===
1978 Nova Scotia general election: Halifax Citadel
| Party | Candidate | Votes | % | ±% |
|---|---|---|---|---|
| Progressive Conservative | Art Donahoe | 3,780 | 40.56 | 5.75 |
| Liberal | Ronald Wallace | 3,525 | 37.82 | -10.91 |
| New Democratic | Michael Bradfield | 2,015 | 21.62 | 5.16 |
| Total | | 9,320 | – | |
Source(s) Source: Nova Scotia Legislature (2024). "Electoral History for Halifax Citadel (1967)" (PDF). nslegislature.ca. Nova Scotia, Chief Electoral Officer (1978). Returns of the General Election for the House of Assembly, Twenty-Ninth General Election (PDF) (Report). Queen's Printer. Archived from the original (PDF) on June 18, 2018.

=== 1974 ===
1974 Nova Scotia general election: Halifax Citadel
| Party | Candidate | Votes | % | ±% |
|---|---|---|---|---|
| Liberal | Ronald Wallace | 4,299 | 48.73 | -5.67 |
| Progressive Conservative | Richard MacLean | 3,071 | 34.81 | -10.79 |
| New Democratic | Michael Bradfield | 1,452 | 16.46 | – |
| Total | | 8,822 | – | |
Source(s) Source: Nova Scotia Legislature (2024). "Electoral History for Halifax Citadel (1967)" (PDF). nslegislature.ca. Nova Scotia, Chief Electoral Officer (1974). Returns of the General Election for the House of Assembly, Twenty-Eighth General Election (PDF) (Report). Queen's Printer. Archived from the original (PDF) on June 18, 2018.

=== 1970 ===
1970 Nova Scotia general election: Halifax Citadel
| Party | Candidate | Votes | % | ±% |
|---|---|---|---|---|
| Liberal | Ronald Wallace | 4,572 | 54.40 | 13.49 |
| Progressive Conservative | Donald MacKeen Smith | 3,833 | 45.60 | -9.81 |
| Total | | 8,405 | – | |
Source(s) Source: Nova Scotia Legislature (2024). "Electoral History for Halifax Citadel (1967)" (PDF). nslegislature.ca. Nova Scotia, Legislative Assembly (1970). Returns of the General Election for the House of Assembly, 1970 (PDF) (Report). Queen's Printer. Archived from the original (PDF) on July 25, 2018.

=== 1967 ===
1967 Nova Scotia general election: Halifax Citadel
| Party | Candidate | Votes | % | ±% |
|---|---|---|---|---|
| Progressive Conservative | Donald MacKeen Smith | 4,771 | 55.41 | – |
| Liberal | Robert Matheson | 3,522 | 40.91 | – |
| New Democratic | M. Rae Gillman | 317 | 3.68 | – |
| Total | | 8,610 | – | |
Source(s) Source: Nova Scotia Legislature (2024). "Electoral History for Halifax Citadel (1967)" (PDF). nslegislature.ca. Nova Scotia Legislature (1967). Returns of the General Election for the House of Assembly (PDF) (Report). Queen's Printer. Archived from the original (PDF) on July 25, 2018.

== See also ==
- List of Nova Scotia provincial electoral districts
- Canadian provincial electoral districts
