= Peter Delefes =

Canadian politician

MLA for Halifax Citadel
- In office 1998–1999
- Preceded by: Ed Kinley
- Succeeded by: Jane Purves

Personal details
- Born: 1944 (age 81–82)
- Party: NDP

Peter Delefes is a Canadian politician. He represented the electoral district of Halifax Citadel in the Nova Scotia House of Assembly from 1998 to 1999 as a member of the Nova Scotia New Democratic Party.

Delefes is a life-long resident of the South End neighbourhood of Halifax, Nova Scotia. A graduate of Dalhousie University, Delefes is a retired school principal. He was an active member of the Nova Scotia Teachers Union, serving as president of the Halifax Local. He also served as President of the Heritage Trust of Nova Scotia.

Delefes attempted to enter provincial politics in 1997, but lost to Liberal Ed Kinley by 165 votes in a byelection for the Halifax Citadel riding. He ran again in 1998, and appeared to defeat Kinley by 125 votes on election night, however, there was some confusion over the calculation of poll results and the margin of victory was reduced to 40 when official results were announced. A judicial recount was held on April 14, and Delefes was officially declared elected by 37 votes.

In the 1999 election, Delefes and Kinley ran against each other for the third time in 19 months, but Progressive Conservative Jane Purves won the seat, defeating Delefes by 434 votes. Delefes tried to regain the seat in the 2003 election, but both he and Purves were defeated by Liberal leader Danny Graham.
