= 58th Nova Scotia general election =

The 58th Nova Scotia general election may refer to

- the 1999 Nova Scotia general election, the 57th overall general election for Nova Scotia, for the (due to a counting error in 1859) 58th General Assembly of Nova Scotia, or
- the 2003 Nova Scotia general election, the 58th overall general election for Nova Scotia, for the 59th General Assembly of Nova Scotia, but considered the 36th general election for the Canadian province of Nova Scotia.
