= Wayne Gaudet =

Canadian politician

The Honourable Wayne Gaudet ECNS

MLA for Clare
- In office May 25, 1993 – October 8, 2013
- Preceded by: Guy LeBlanc
- Succeeded by: riding dissolved

Interim Leader of the Nova Scotia Liberal Party
- In office January 12, 2004 – October 23, 2004
- Preceded by: Danny Graham
- Succeeded by: Francis MacKenzie

Interim Leader of the Nova Scotia Liberal Party
- In office July 1, 2000 – April 13, 2002
- Preceded by: Russell MacLellan
- Succeeded by: Danny Graham

Speaker of the Nova Scotia House of Assembly
- In office November 18, 1996 – November 20, 1997
- Preceded by: Paul MacEwan
- Succeeded by: Gerry Fogarty

Personal details
- Born: Wayne Jean Gaudet; August 12, 1955 (age 70) Concession, Nova Scotia, Canada
- Party: Liberal
- Occupation: teacher

Wayne Jean Gaudet (born August 12, 1955) is a Canadian politician. He represented the electoral district of Clare in the Nova Scotia House of Assembly from 1993 to 2013. He is a member of the Nova Scotia Liberal Party.

== Early life ==
Born in Concession, Nova Scotia, he graduated in 1977 with a Bachelor of Arts at the Université Sainte-Anne and then received a Bachelor of Education at Saint Mary's University. He later settled in Church Point where he worked as a teacher and a high school vice principal.

== Political career ==
Gaudet was first elected in 1993, and appointed to the Executive Council of Nova Scotia on June 11, 1993, as Minister of Agriculture. Gaudet served in a number of other cabinet posts during the 1990s, including Minister of Human Resources, Minister of Housing and Municipal Affairs, Minister of Education and Culture, Minister of Business and Consumer Affairs, and Minister responsible for Acadian Affairs. He also served as Speaker of the House. He served as interim leader of the party from 2000 to 2002, after Russell MacLellan's resignation and before Danny Graham was elected leader. Gaudet also served as interim leader after Graham's resignation and before Francis MacKenzie's election.

On January 18, 2013, Gaudet announced that he will not be running in the next provincial election, in part due to the new electoral map.

== Electoral record ==
2009 Nova Scotia general election
Party	Candidate	Votes	%	±%
Liberal	Wayne Gaudet	3,392	64.68	
New Democratic Party	Paul Comeau	1,326	25.29	
Progressive Conservative	Jimmy Doucet	459	8.75	
Green	Diane Bean	67	1.28	–

2006 Nova Scotia general election
Party	Candidate	Votes	%	±%
Liberal	Wayne Gaudet	2,803	48.53	
Progressive Conservative	Arnold LeBlanc	1,622	28.08	
New Democratic Party	Paul Comeau	1,269	21.97	
Green	Diane Doucet-Bean	82	1.42	–

2003 Nova Scotia general election
Party	Candidate	Votes	%	±%
Liberal	Wayne Gaudet	3,547	61.55	
Progressive Conservative	Marc Boudreau	1,456	25.26	
New Democratic Party	Don Melanson	760	13.19	

1999 Nova Scotia general election
Party	Candidate	Votes	%	±%
Liberal	Wayne Gaudet	2,705	43.76	
Progressive Conservative	Paul Comeau	2,355	38.10	
New Democratic Party	Don Melanson	1,078	17.44	
Nova Scotia Party	Anne Marie Boyer	43	0.70	

1998 Nova Scotia general election
Party	Candidate	Votes	%	±%
Liberal	Wayne Gaudet	2,950	47.28	
Progressive Conservative	Guy LeBlanc	2,578	41.32	
New Democratic Party	Vanessa Paddock	711	11.40	

1993 Nova Scotia general election
Party	Candidate	Votes	%	±%
Liberal	Wayne Gaudet	3,461	51.99	
Progressive Conservative	Guy LeBlanc	2,854	42.87	
New Democratic Party	Christian Collin	342	5.14	
