= Sterling Belliveau =

Canadian politician

The Honourable Sterling Belliveau ECNS

Member of the Nova Scotia House of Assembly for Queens-Shelburne Shelburne (2006-2013)
- In office June 13, 2006 – May 30, 2017
- Preceded by: Cecil O'Donnell
- Succeeded by: Kim Masland

Minister of Environment
- In office June 19, 2009 – October 22, 2013
- Premier: Darrell Dexter
- Preceded by: David Morse
- Succeeded by: Randy Delorey

Minister of Fisheries and Aquaculture
- In office June 19, 2009 – October 22, 2013
- Premier: Darrell Dexter
- Preceded by: Ron Chisholm
- Succeeded by: Keith Colwell

Personal details
- Born: August 5, 1953 (age 72)
- Party: NDP (2006-2020); PC (2020-present)
- Occupation: fisherman

Sterling William Wallace Belliveau (born August 5, 1953) is a Canadian politician. Belliveau represented the electoral district of Shelburne (now Queens-Shelburne) in the Nova Scotia House of Assembly from 2006 to 2017 as a member of the Nova Scotia New Democratic Party.

== Early life ==
Belliveau grew up in Woods Harbour, Nova Scotia and was previously a self-employed fisherman.

== Political career ==
=== Municipal politics ===
Belliveau served for three terms as a municipal councillor representing District 1 (Charlesville, Forbes Point and Woods Harbour) on the municipal council for the Municipality of the District of Barrington; two of those terms he served as warden.

=== Provincial politics ===
In 2006 Belliveau successfully ran for the Nova Scotia New Democratic Party nomination in the constituency of Shelburne. He was elected in the 2006 provincial election, defeating Progressive Conservative candidate Eddie Nickerson by 65 votes. He was re-elected in the 2009 provincial election, receiving 55.41% of the votes and increasing his vote to 2,207 over his closest challenger. Belliveau's riding was abolished in the 2012 electoral boundary review. Belliveau was re-elected in the 2013 provincial election representing the new riding of Queens-Shelburne where he received 37.1% of the votes with a margin of 381 votes over his closest challenger.

On June 19, 2009, Belliveau was appointed to the Executive Council of Nova Scotia, serving as Minister of Fisheries and Aquaculture as well as Minister of Environment. He served in the Executive Council until October 22, 2013.

In June 2016, Belliveau announced that he is not reoffering in the 2017 Nova Scotia general election.

==== Re-entry into provincial politics ====
On February 4, 2021, Belliveau announced he was seeking the Progressive Conservative nomination to run in his former seat as MLA in the reorganized constituency of Queens-Shelburne. In the previous year, Belliveau had re-entered the public view over the 2020 Mi'kmaq lobster dispute, at the time calling for a one-year pause to the Miꞌkmaq moderate livelihood fishery organized by the Sipekneꞌkatik First Nation. Belliveau was quoted as saying, "I can assure you the commercial industry feels they have not had an opportunity to have their voices heard at the table," indicating that he believed Mi'kmaq livelihood fishing affirmed under The Marshall Decision must be tied to the commercial fishing season. Acknowledging his shift from the NDP to Conservative, Belliveau noted he believed the switch would be more likely to result in a win for him, and stated that he was unhappy with the Federal NDP's stance on the ongoing fisheries issue, which contrary to Belliveau, supports an indigenous moderate livelihood fishery apart from the commercial season.

== Personal life ==
He is married to Luella Jean (Cameron) and they have two adult children and one grandchild.

== Electoral record ==
2013 Nova Scotia general election
Party	Candidate	Votes	%	±%
New Democratic Party	Sterling Belliveau	3,066	37.10	N/A
Progressive Conservative	Bruce Inglis	2,685	32.49	N/A
Liberal	Benson Frail	2,302	27.86	N/A
Green	Madeline Taylor	211	2.55	N/A

2009 Nova Scotia general election
Party	Candidate	Votes	%	±%
New Democratic Party	Sterling Belliveau	3844	55.41	
Progressive Conservative	Eddie Nickerson	1637	23.59	
Liberal	Darian Huskilson	1356	19.54	
Green	Robin Smith	101	1.46	–

2006 Nova Scotia general election
Party	Candidate	Votes	%	±%
New Democratic Party	Sterling Belliveau	2438	36.27	
Progressive Conservative	Eddie Nickerson	2373	35.00	
Liberal	Kirk Cox	1790	26.63	
Green	Derek Jones	141	2.1	–
