= Ken McGowan =

Canadian environmentalist, entrepreneur and politician

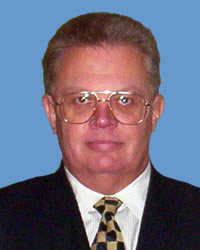
- Born: Sudbury, Ontario
- Occupations: Environmentalist, Entrepreneur, Former Politician
- Known for: Green Party of Nova Scotia Former Leader

Ken McGowan (born 1954) is an environmentalist, entrepreneur and former politician.

== Early life ==
McGowan is a graduate of the University of Toronto with a degree in biology.

== Political career ==
=== Early political career ===
McGowan was the Green Party of Nova Scotia's candidate for the electoral district of Annapolis in the 2006 Nova Scotia general election and also a regional party organizer prior to his leadership of the party.

=== Green Party of Nova Scotia leadership ===
In 2007, McGowan was elected leader of the Green Party of Nova Scotia. According to the CBC some of his supporters claimed "it was McGowan's work as an organizer for the Greens that won him the leadership." McGowan beat out Ellen Durkee, and Aaron Eisses during the convention held in early May 2007. McGowan received over 50% of the vote, compared to Durkee's 34% and Eisses' 15%. A poll in June 2007 showed the Green Party of Nova Scotia, under McGowan, at 7 per cent popular support. A provincial by-election was held in Nova Scotia on 2 October 2007 in Cole Harbour-Eastern Passage in which one of McGowan's deputy leaders, Beverley Woodfield was the GPNS candidate. Woodfield garnered 4.68% of the vote, doubling the party's vote share in the riding.

McGowan resigned his leadership, along with his two deputy leaders and several executive members of the Green Party of Nova Scotia in 2008 after a disagreement with the party executive. McGowan stated the resignations were over two party members being appointed, and not elected to the party executive, contrary to the party's constitution.

| Preceded by Nick Wright | Leader of the Green Party of Nova Scotia; 2007-2008 | Succeeded by Ellen Durkee |
