= Kate Carmichael =

Canadian businesswoman and politician

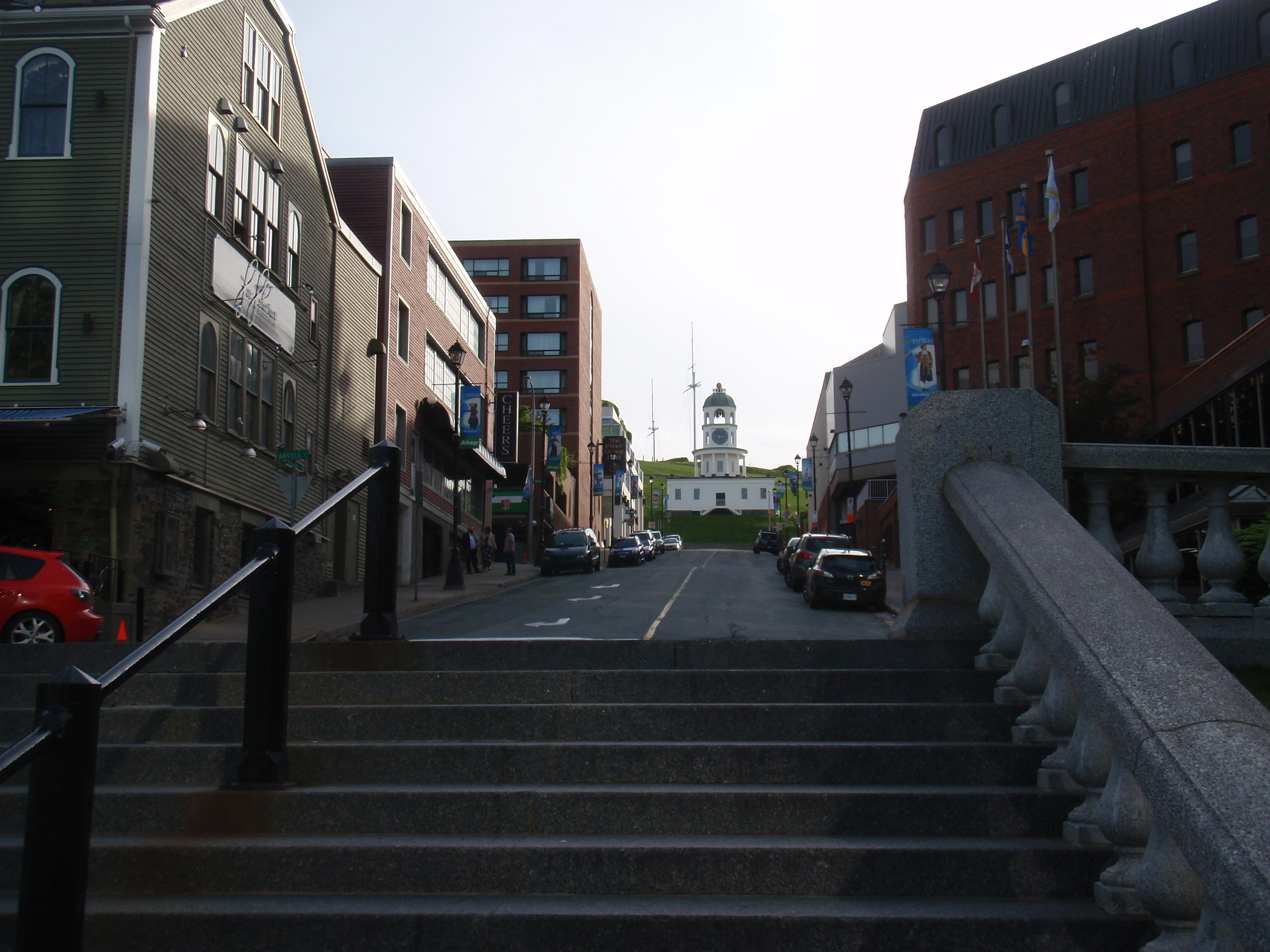
- Carmichael Street, named in Carmichael's honour
- Died: October 17, 2001
- Occupation(s): Businesswoman, politician

Kate Carmichael (died October 17, 2001) was a Canadian business leader and politician who lived in Halifax, Nova Scotia.

Carmichael was elected to the Lunenburg County District School Board in 1988 and became its chair in 1990, serving until 1991 when she moved to Halifax. In 1994, was elected city alderman for Ward 2 – Halifax South End, but lost the seat in 1995 after the formation of the Halifax Regional Municipality.

In 1997, Carmichael made an unsuccessful run for the provincial legislature as candidate for the Nova Scotia Progressive Conservative Party in the Halifax Citadel by-election.

In September 2001, Carmichael was recognized by the Halifax Chamber of Commerce for her contributions to Halifax's downtown with their Special Award for Community Contribution.

As executive director of the Downtown Halifax Business Commission (1996–2001) she was instrumental in the revitalization of Downtown Halifax.

After being diagnosed with leukemia in 1999, Carmichael was featured in a number of articles and news stories. Though she was only given three months to live in 1999, she remained active and was very public with her illness and her struggle with the cancer and didn't shy away from talking about dying. Carmichael died on October 17, 2001, at the age of 51.

Posthumously, Carmichael was awarded a Doctorate of Fine Arts (honoris causa) from the Nova Scotia College of Art and Design in December 2001. She is also recognized by the Downtown Halifax Business Commission who hold a series of lectures on urban planning in her name: The Carmichael Lecture Series. A section of George Street, which runs up the centre of downtown Halifax terminating in a view of the Town Clock, was renamed Carmichael Street in her honour.
