= 2006 Progressive Conservative Association of Nova Scotia leadership election =

- February 11, 2006
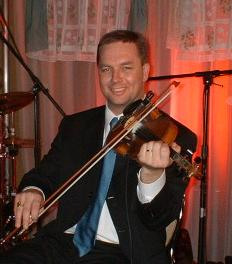
Candidate	Rodney MacDonald	Bill Black	Neil LeBlanc
Riding	Inverness	—	—
Second ballot	1,263; 59.6%	855; 40.4%	Eliminated
First ballot	789; 35.0%	742; 32.8%	730; 32.2%
Leader before election
John Hamm
Elected Leader
Rodney MacDonald

2006 Progressive Conservative Association of Nova Scotia leadership election
- Date: February 11, 2006
- Resigning leader: John Hamm
- Won by: Rodney MacDonald
- Ballots: 2
- Candidates: 3

The Progressive Conservative Association of Nova Scotia leadership election of 2006 was held on February 11, 2006 to select a replacement for John Hamm, as Premier of Nova Scotia and leader of the Progressive Conservative Association of Nova Scotia.

== Timeline ==
- September 29, 2005 - Hamm announces his retirement, effective upon the election of a new leader.
- October 15, 2005 - The PC Party announces that the leadership vote will be held on February 11, 2006 with a delegated convention as opposed to the one member one vote system used in the previous race.
- October 26, 2005 - Bill Black becomes the first candidate to officially enter the race.
- October 28, 2005 - Neil LeBlanc becomes the second candidate to officially enter the race.
- November 4, 2005 - Rodney MacDonald becomes the third candidate to officially enter the race.
- December 27, 2005 - Membership cutoff date.
- January 7, 2006 - Delegate selection period begins.
- February 11, 2006 - Leadership convention held in Halifax. Rodney MacDonald wins on 2nd ballot with support from Neil LeBlanc.
- February 24, 2006 - MacDonald sworn in as 32nd Premier of Nova Scotia.

== Candidates ==
- Bill Black, former CEO of Maritime Life and candidate for the Halifax Citadel by-election
- Neil LeBlanc, former minister of Finance
- Rodney MacDonald, minister of Tourism, Culture & Heritage and MLA for Inverness

== Non-candidates ==
The following individuals were the subject of media speculation about running or themselves indicated they were considering a run but eventually opted against.

- Michael Baker, minister of Justice and MLA for Lunenburg
- Jamie Baillie, former Chief of Staff to Premier Hamm.
- Cecil Clarke, minister of Energy and MLA for Cape Breton North
- Ernie Fage, minister of Economic Development and MLA for Cumberland North
- Richard Hurlburt, minister of Natural Resources and MLA for Yarmouth
- Peter Kelly, mayor of Halifax
- Peter MacKay, deputy leader of the Conservative Party of Canada and MP for Central Nova
- Kerry Morash, minister of Environment and Labour and MLA for Queens
- Jane Purves, former minister of Education, Chief of Staff to Premier Hamm
- Judy Streatch, MLA for Chester-St. Margaret's

== Results ==
=== First Ballot ===
The first ballot was close, with just 59 votes separating the first and last place candidates.

	First Ballot	
Candidate	Votes	Perc.
Rodney MacDonald	789	34.85%
Bill Black	742	32.77%
Neil LeBlanc	730	32.24%
Spoiled Ballots	3	0.13%
Totals	2,264	100%

LeBlanc eliminated, supports MacDonald.

=== Second Ballot ===
	Second Ballot	
Candidate	Votes	Perc.
Rodney MacDonald	1,263	59.29%
Bill Black	855	40.14%
Spoiled Ballots	12	0.67%
Totals	2,130	100%
