= Francis MacKenzie =

Canadian politician (born 1960)

Leader of the Nova Scotia Liberal Party
- In office October 23, 2004 – June 20, 2006
- Preceded by: Wayne Gaudet
- Succeeded by: Michel Samson (interim)

Personal details
- Born: May 7, 1960 (age 66) St. John's, Newfoundland
- Party: Liberal

Francis MacKenzie (born May 7, 1960) is a former leader of the Nova Scotia Liberal Party. He won the leadership for the party on October 23, 2004.

== Early life ==
Following graduation from St. Francis Xavier University in 1982, MacKenzie worked in Ontario in sales and development roles for Sealtest/Ault Foods, and Bausch & Lomb Canada. He also served for several years as General Manager for MacKenzie Standardbreds, a horse racing enterprise operating in Toronto, Montreal, New York City, and New Jersey, and one of the largest of its kind in Canada.

Returning to Nova Scotia in 1989, MacKenzie became Director of Sales for the Halifax Citadels hockey franchise for two years. In 1992, he graduated with an Executive MBA from Saint Mary's University. He was then hired as executive director for the Town of Bedford’s Economic Development Commission, a position he held until 1996 when the town became part of the Halifax Regional Municipality.

From 1996 to 1997, MacKenzie was the vice president and general manager of the Greater Halifax Partnership, a business/government partnership involved in economic development for the metro area.

== Political career ==
In 2002, he ran for the Nova Scotia Liberal Party leadership, and came in second to Danny Graham. In 2004 Graham stepped down from the party's leadership for family reasons, triggering another leadership campaign. MacKenzie re-offered and won. Although serving as leader for over a year he did not attempt to win a seat in the Nova Scotia House of Assembly until the 2006 provincial election. MacKenzie led the Liberals to a poor showing; reducing their caucus from 11 MLAs to 9 MLAs (only 1984 had fewer seats). MacKenzie failed in his effort to win his own seat in Bedford. He said that he would meet with the president of the Liberal Party of Nova Scotia in order to discuss the future of the party. MacKenzie resigned shortly after the election, and was succeeded by Michel Samson on an interim basis, then Stephen McNeil in April 2007.
