= Art Donahoe =

Canadian politician

Arthur R. Donahoe KC

4th Secretary-General of the Commonwealth Parliamentary Association
- In office 1993–2001
- Preceded by: David Tonkin
- Succeeded by: Denis Marshall

Speaker of the Nova Scotia House of Assembly
- In office 1981–1991
- Preceded by: Ron Russell
- Succeeded by: Ron Russell

MLA for Halifax Citadel
- In office 1978–1993
- Preceded by: Ron Wallace
- Succeeded by: Terry Donahoe

Personal details
- Born: April 7, 1940 (age 86) Halifax, Nova Scotia
- Party: Progressive Conservative
- Occupation: lawyer

Arthur R. Donahoe KC (born April 7, 1940) is a former lawyer and political figure in Nova Scotia, Canada. He represented Halifax Citadel in the Nova Scotia House of Assembly from 1978 to 1993 as a Progressive Conservative member.

He was born in Halifax, the son of Richard Donahoe and Mary Eileen Boyd, and was educated at Saint Mary's University and Dalhousie Law School. He was admitted to the Nova Scotia bar in 1966.

In 1972, Donahoe married Carolyn MacCormack. He served as Speaker of the House of Assembly of Nova Scotia from 1981 to 1991. Donahoe was named Queen's Counsel in 1982. He was president of the Nova Scotia branch of the Canadian Bar Association and of the Nova Scotia Medical Legal Society. In 1993, he was named Secretary-General of the Commonwealth Parliamentary Association, serving in that post until 2002. His brother, Terry, also served in the provincial assembly.
