= 2006 Nova Scotia general election =

Canadian provincial election

- June 13, 2006

52 seats of the Nova Scotia House of Assembly 27 seats needed for a majority
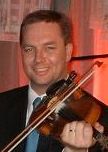

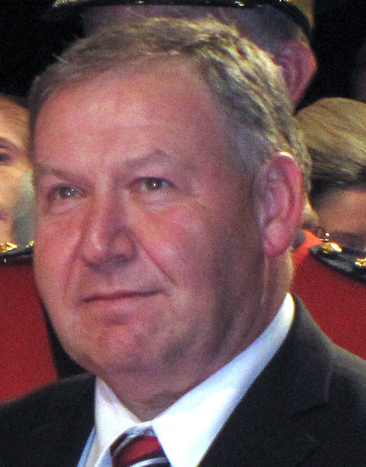
	First party	Second party	Third party
			LIB
Leader	Rodney MacDonald	Darrell Dexter	Francis MacKenzie
Party	Progressive Conservative	New Democratic	Liberal
Leader since	February 11, 2006	June 2, 2002	October 23, 2004
Leader's seat	Inverness	Cole Harbour	Ran in Bedford (lost)
Last election	25 seats, 36.32%	15 seats, 31.00%	12 seats, 31.47%
Seats won	23	20	9
Seat change	▼2	▲5	▼3
Popular vote	160,119	140,128	94,872
Percentage	39.57%	34.63%	23.44%
Swing	▲3.33%	▲3.52%	▼7.99%
- Popular vote by riding. As this is an FPTP election, seat totals are not determined by popular vote, but instead via results by each riding.
Premier before election
Rodney MacDonald
Progressive Conservative
Premier after election
Rodney MacDonald
Progressive Conservative

The 2006 Nova Scotia general election was held on June 13, 2006 to elect members of the 60th House of Assembly of the Province of Nova Scotia, Canada.

Premier Rodney MacDonald, who led a Progressive Conservative minority government in the legislature, called for the election on May 13, 2006, hoping for a majority government to better advance his agenda and a clear mandate for himself as he had not yet fought an election as leader.

Ultimately, MacDonald was returned to power leading another, slightly smaller, minority government against a strengthened New Democratic Party sitting as the Official Opposition and a weakened Liberal Party. Liberal leader Francis MacKenzie was defeated in his riding of Bedford.

== Timeline ==
- September 29, 2005 - Premier John Hamm, leader of the Progressive Conservative minority government, announces his intent to resign as soon as the party chooses a new leader.
- February 11, 2006 - Rodney MacDonald is elected to replace Hamm as leader.
- February 24, 2006 - MacDonald becomes Premier and his cabinet is sworn in.
- May 9, 2006 - MacDonald's government introduces an "election-style" budget in the legislature.
- May 13, 2006 - Premier Rodney MacDonald calls a general election for June 13, 2006.

== Campaign ==
MacKenzie was an outspoken critic of the governing Tories and accused them of living in a "fantasy world" due to their promise to cut taxes and increase spending in the 2006-07 budget.

No single issue dominated the election campaign, with all parties offering up various promises for university students to seniors.

== Results ==
The Progressive Conservatives gained several points in the popular vote, but made a net loss of two seats, with losses to the NDP partially countered by the PCs doubling their representation on MacDonald's native Cape Breton Island at the expense of the Liberals. The gap between the Liberals and NDP also significantly increased, in both the popular vote and seat count; while the Liberals and NDP had previously been nearly even, the NDP gained a significant advantage on the Liberals and moved into position as the primary opposition to the governing PCs.

=== Results by party ===
↓
23	20	9
Progressive Conservative	New Democratic	Liberal

Party	Votes	%	+/–	Seats			
Party	Votes	%	+/–	2003	Dissolution	Seats	Seat Change
Progressive Conservative	160,119	39.57	▲3.33	25	25	23	▼2
New Democratic Party	140,128	34.63	▲3.52	15	15	20	▲5
Liberal	94,872	23.44	▼7.99	12	10	9	▼3
Green	9,411	2.33	New	New	New	0	New
Independents	153	0.04	▼0.38	0	1	0	Steady
Vacant				–	1	–	–
Total	404,683	100.00	–	52	52	52	–

Popular vote
PC	39.57%
New Democratic	34.63%
Liberal	23.44%
Others	2.36%

Seats summary
PC	44.23%
New Democratic	38.46%
Liberal	17.31%

=== Results by region ===
Party name		HRM	C.B.	Valley	S. Shore	Fundy	Central	Total
Parties winning seats in the legislature:
Progressive Conservative	Seats:	3	4	3	5	5	3	23
Progressive Conservative	Popular vote:	31.22%	42.62%	36.14%	49.08%	54.06%	42.90%	39.59%
New Democratic Party	Seats:	13	2	-	2	1	2	20
New Democratic Party	Popular vote:	46.57%	25.58%	23.44%	32.29%	26.49%	34.44%	34.50%
Liberal	Seats:	2	3	4	-	-	-	9
Liberal	Popular vote:	19.29%	29.80%	38.35%	16.46%	16.70%	21.03%	23.56%
Parties not winning seats in the legislature:
Green	Popular vote:	2.92%	1.83%	2.07%	2.16%	2.72%	1.58%	2.31%
Independents	Popular vote:	-	0.17%	-	-	0.03%	0.05%	0.04%
Total seats:		18	9	7	7	6	5	52

== Retiring incumbents ==
Progressive Conservative

- Ron Russell, Hants West
- Cecil O'Donnell, Shelburne
- Bill Langille, Colchester North
- Peter G. Christie, Bedford
- John Hamm, Pictou Centre
- Jim DeWolfe, Pictou East

New Democratic

- Jerry Pye, Dartmouth North

Independent

- Russell MacKinnon, Cape Breton West

== Nominated candidates ==
Legend
bold denotes party leader
† denotes an incumbent who is not running for re-election or was defeated in nomination contest

=== Valley ===
Electoral district	Candidates					Incumbent
Electoral district	PC	NDP	Liberal	Green	Independent	Incumbent
Annapolis	Blair Hannam; 2,041; 24.57%	Calum MacKenzie; 1,391; 16.75%	Stephen McNeil; 4,668; 56.20%	Ken McGowan; 206; 2.48%		Stephen McNeil
Clare	Arnold LeBlanc; 1,622; 28.08%	Paul Comeau; 1,269; 21.97%	Wayne Gaudet; 2,803; 48.53%	Diane Doucet-Bean; 82; 1.42%		Wayne Gaudet
Digby—Annapolis	Jimmy MacAlpine; 2,170; 36.42%	Andrew Oliver; 663; 11.13%	Harold Theriault; 3,034; 50.91%	Namron Bean; 92; 1.54%		Harold Theriault
Hants West	Chuck Porter; 2,969; 34.60%	Sean Bennett; 2,486; 28.97%	Paula Lunn; 2,924; 34.08%	Sam Schurman; 201; 2.34%		Ron Russell†
Kings North	Mark Parent; 4,153; 50.07%	Jim Morton; 2,190; 26.40%	Madonna Spinazola; 1,757; 21.18%	Christopher Alders; 195; 2.35%		Mark Parent
Kings South	David Morse; 3,788; 42.37%	David Mangle; 3,130; 35.01%	Ray Savage; 1,797; 20.10%	Steven McGowan; 226; 2.53%		David Morse
Kings West	John Prall; 2,801; 33.18%	Greg Hubbert; 1,590; 18.83%	Leo Glavine; 3,940; 46.67%	Nistal Prem de Boer; 112; 1.33%		Leo Glavine

=== South Shore ===
Electoral district	Candidates					Incumbent
Electoral district	PC	NDP	Liberal	Green	Independent	Incumbent
Argyle	Chris d'Entremont; 3,158; 67.65%	Charles Muise; 531; 11.38%	Christian Surette; 913; 19.56%	Patricia Saunders; 66; 1.41%		Chris d'Entremont
Chester-St. Margaret's	Judy Streatch; 3,950; 42.67%	Jane Matheson; 2,833; 30.60%	Rick Fraughton; 2,192; 23.68%	Joanne MacKinnon; 282; 3.05%		Judy Streatch
Lunenburg	Michael Baker; 3,969; 49.40%	Chris Heide; 2,669; 33.22%	Rick Welsford; 1,200; 14.94%	Stuart Simpson; 196; 2.44%		Michael Baker
Lunenburg West	Carolyn Bolivar-Getson; 3,637; 43.21%	Bill Smith; 3,299; 39.19%	Martin Bell; 1,324; 15.73%	Brendan MacNeill; 157; 1.87%		Carolyn Bolivar-Getson
Queens	Kerry Morash; 2,998; 48.59%	Vicki Conrad; 3,053; 49.48%		Margaret Whitney; 119; 1.93%		Kerry Morash
Shelburne	Eddie Nickerson; 2,353; 35.00%	Sterling Belliveau; 2,438; 36.27%	Kirk Cox; 1,790; 26.63%	Derek Jones; 141; 2.10%		Cecil O'Donnell†
Yarmouth	Richard Hurlburt; 5,170; 64.30%	John Deveau; 1,667; 20.73%	Dolores Atwood; 1,051; 13.07%	Matt Granger; 152; 1.89%		Richard Hurlburt

=== Fundy-Northeast ===
Electoral district	Candidates					Incumbent
Electoral district	PC	NDP	Liberal	Green	Independent	Incumbent
Colchester-Musquodoboit Valley	Brooke Taylor; 4,790; 63.85%	Gary Burrill; 1,891; 25.21%	Carolyn Matthews; 657; 8.76%	Leona MacLeod; 164; 2.19%		Brooke Taylor
Colchester North	Karen Casey; 3,809; 50.96%	Rob Assels; 1,511; 20.21%	Bob Taylor; 1,979; 26.47%	Judy Davis; 176; 2.35%		Bill Langille †
Cumberland North	Ernie Fage; 4,640; 62.64%	Kim Cail; 1,085; 14.65%	Bruce Alan Fage; 1,480; 19.98%	Darryl Whetter; 202; 2.73%		Ernie Fage
Cumberland South	Murray Scott; 5,082; 76.76%	Andrew Kernohan; 753; 11.37%	Mary Dee MacPherson; 681; 10.29%	James Dessart; 92; 1.39%	David Raymond Amos; 13; 0.20%	Murray Scott
Hants East	Wayne Fiander; 2,715; 30.62%	John MacDonell; 4,712; 53.13%	Malcolm A. MacKay; 1,237; 13.95%	Michael Hartlan; 204; 2.30%		John MacDonell
Truro-Bible Hill	Jamie Muir; 3,711; 47.27%	Jim Harpell; 2,248; 28.64%	Ron Chisholm; 1,674; 21.32%	Barton Cutten; 217; 2.76%		Jamie Muir

=== Central Halifax ===
Electoral district	Candidates					Incumbent
Electoral district	PC	NDP	Liberal	Green	Independent	Incumbent
Halifax Chebucto	Sean Phillips; 1,720; 22.09%	Howard Epstein; 4,216; 54.15%	Peter Verner; 1,481; 19.02%	Christopher Harborne; 369; 4.74%		Howard Epstein
Halifax Citadel	Bill Black; 2,724; 37.45%	Leonard Preyra; 3,054; 42.03%	Devin Maxwell; 1,181; 16.25%	**Nick Wright**; 307; 4.23%		Vacant
Halifax Clayton Park	Mary Ann McGrath; 2,450; 26.86%	Linda Power; 3,040; 33.33%	Diana Whalen; 3,404; 37.32%	Sheila Richardson; 307; 3.37%		Diana Whalen
Halifax Fairview	Bruce MacCharles; 1,649; 23.13%	Graham Steele; 4,172; 58.51%	Cecil MacDougall; 1,055; 14.80%	Kris MacLellan; 254; 3.56%		Graham Steele
Halifax Needham	Andrew Black; 1,330; 18.17%	Maureen MacDonald; 4,438; 60.62%	Errol Gaum; 1,220; 16.66%	Amanda Myers; 333; 4.55%		Maureen MacDonald

=== Suburban Halifax ===
Electoral district	Candidates					Incumbent
Electoral district	PC	NDP	Liberal	Green	Independent	Incumbent
Bedford	Len Goucher; 4,090; 42.22%	John Buckland; 2,019; 20.84%	**Francis MacKenzie**; 3,286; 33.92%	Mary McLaughlan; 292; 3.01%		Peter G. Christie †
Halifax Atlantic	Bruce Cooke; 2,690; 32.08%	Michèle Raymond; 4,151; 49.51%	Jim Hoskins; 1,281; 15.28%	Rebecca Mosher; 262; 3.13%		Michele Raymond
Hammonds Plains-Upper Sackville	Barry Barnet; 3,704; 42.02%	Mat Whynott; 3,178; 36.05%	Pam Streeter; 1,766; 20.03%	Scott Cleghorn; 167; 1.89%		Barry Barnet
Sackville-Cobequid	Steve Craig; 2,499; 30.42%	Dave Wilson; 4,477; 54.50%	David Major; 1,051; 12.80%	Elizabeth Nicolson; 187; 2.28%		Dave Wilson
Timberlea-Prospect	Jaunita Cirtwell; 2,034; 24.16%	Bill Estabrooks; 5,317; 63.15%	Lisa Mullin; 851; 10.11%	Thomas Trappenberg; 217; 2.58%		Bill Estabrooks
Waverley-Fall River-Beaver Bank	Gary Hines; 3,275; 40.17%	Percy Paris; 3,782; 46.39%	Thomas Deal; 909; 11.15%	William Lang; 186; 2.28%		Gary Hines

=== Dartmouth/Cole Harbour/Eastern Shore ===
Electoral district	Candidates					Incumbent
Electoral district	PC	NDP	Liberal	Green	Independent	Incumbent
Cole Harbour	Sheila McKeand; 1,788; 20.63%	**Darrell Dexter**; 5,327; 61.46%	Stephen Beehan; 1,347; 15.54%	Michael McFadden; 206; 2.38%		Darrell Dexter
Cole Harbour-Eastern Passage	Don McIver; 1,201; 18.93%	Kevin Deveaux; 4,086; 64.40%	Brian Churchill; 903; 14.23%	Beverly Woodfield; 155; 2.44%		Kevin Deveaux
Dartmouth East	Jim Cormier; 2,942; 33.27%	Joan Massey; 3,822; 43.22%	Tracey Devereaux; 1,842; 20.83%	Elizabeth Perry; 238; 2.69%		Joan Massey
Dartmouth North	Troy Myers; 1,895; 27.46%	Trevor Zinck; 3,414; 49.47%	Ian Murray; 1,365; 19.78%	Alex Donaldson; 227; 3.29%		Jerry Pye†
Dartmouth South-Portland Valley	Tim Olive; 3,041; 32.52%	Marilyn More; 4,493; 48.05%	Brian Hiltz; 1,509; 16.14%	Daniel Melvin; 308; 3.29%		Marilyn More
Eastern Shore	Bill Dooks; 3,232; 45.93%	Sid Prest; 2,871; 40.80%	Judith Cabrita; 746; 10.60%	Elizabeth van Dreunen; 188; 2.67%		Bill Dooks
Preston	Dwayne Provo; 1,620; 36.83%	Douglas Sparks; 843; 19.17%	Keith Colwell; 1,853; 42.13%	David Farrell; 82; 1.86%		Keith Colwell

=== Central Nova ===
Electoral district	Candidates					Incumbent
Electoral district	PC	NDP	Liberal	Green	Independent	Incumbent
Antigonish	Angus MacIsaac; 4,629; 48.28%	Andrew MacDonald; 1,827; 19.06%	Danny MacIsaac; 2,953; 30.80%	Judy Dowden; 179; 1.87%		Angus MacIsaac
Guysborough-Sheet Harbour	Ron Chisholm; 2,765; 40.83%	Jim Boudreau; 2,540; 37.51%	David Horton; 1,379; 20.36%	Marike Finlay-de Monchy; 88; 1.30%		Ron Chisholm
Pictou Centre	Pat Dunn; 3,901; 52.54%	Danny MacGillivray; 2,354; 31.70%	Troy MacCulloch; 1,057; 14.24%	Samuel M. Clark; 93; 1.25%	Dennis Tate; 20; 0.27%	John Hamm†
Pictou East	Sue Uhren; 2,654; 35.31%	Clarrie MacKinnon; 2,761; 36.73%	Danny Walsh; 2,000; 26.61%	John A. Clark; 102; 1.36%		Jim DeWolfe†
Pictou West	Ronald Baillie; 2,584; 33.99%	Charlie Parker; 4,173; 54.89%	Sandy MacKay; 698; 9.18%	Douglas Corbett; 147; 1.93%		Charlie Parker

=== Cape Breton ===
Electoral district	Candidates					Incumbent
Electoral district	PC	NDP	Liberal	Green	Independent	Incumbent
Cape Breton Centre	Darren Bruckschwaiger; 2,274; 28.44%	Frank Corbett; 3,490; 43.65%	Laura Lee MacDonald; 2,152; 26.92%	Frances Oomen; 79; 0.99%		Frank Corbett
Cape Breton North	Cecil Clarke; 4,310; 50.71%	Russell MacDonald; 2,195; 25.83%	Fred Tilley; 1,869; 21.99%	Mark Doucet; 125; 1.47%		Cecil Clarke
Cape Breton Nova	Todd Marsman; 855; 12.07%	Gordie Gosse; 4,315; 60.92%	Mel Crowe; 1,794; 25.33%	Chris Milburn; 119; 1.68%		Gordie Gosse
Cape Breton South	Scott Boyd; 3,261; 32.36%	Jamie Crane; 2,160; 21.43%	Manning MacDonald; 4,383; 43.50%	Stephen Doucet; 273; 2.71%		Manning MacDonald
Cape Breton West	Alfie MacLeod; 4,729; 53.76%	Terry Crawley; 1,344; 15.28%	Dave LeBlanc; 2,488; 28.28%	Michael Milburn; 236; 2.68%		Russell MacKinnon†
Glace Bay	Mark Bettens; 2,074; 26.85%	Myrtle Campbell; 2,234; 28.93%	David Wilson; 3,327; 43.08%	Todd Pettigrew; 88; 1.14%		Dave Wilson
Inverness	**Rodney MacDonald**; 7,404; 70.47%	Tim Murphy; 1,342; 12.77%	Mary MacLennan; 1,627; 15.49%	John Gibson; 133; 1.27%		Rodney MacDonald
Richmond	John Greene; 2,268; 40.45%	Mary Pat Cude; 529; 9.43%	Michel Samson; 2,722; 48.55%	Noreen Hartlen; 88; 1.57%		Michel Samson
Victoria-The Lakes	Keith Bain; 3,001; 47.48%	Joan O'Liari; 755; 11.94%	Gerald Sampson; 2,272; 35.94%	Michelle Smith; 173; 2.74%	Stemer MacLeod; 120; 1.90%	Gerald Sampson

== Opinion polls ==
A March 2006 poll by Corporate Research Associates asked voters who they would prefer as premier, 36 per cent of respondents picked Premier Rodney MacDonald, compared to 23 per cent for Darrell Dexter and 16 per cent for Francis MacKenzie. The same poll showed the Progressive Conservatives in the lead with 36 per cent of voters compared to 29 per cent for the New Democrats and 27 per cent for the Liberals.

Date	Source	PC	NDP	Liberal
5 Jun 2006	Corporate Research Associates	38	36	20
23 May 2006	Corporate Research Associates	34	27	30
Feb 2006	Corporate Research Associates	36	29	27
Nov 2005	Corporate Research Associates	35	32	28
Aug 2005	Corporate Research Associates	31	32	26
May 2005	Corporate Research Associates	36	30	27
Mar 2005	Corporate Research Associates	38	24	30
Dec 2004	Corporate Research Associates	35	28	30
Sep 2004	Corporate Research Associates	29	30	31
May 2004	Corporate Research Associates	28	33	30
Feb 2004	Corporate Research Associates	31	30	28
Nov 2003	Corporate Research Associates	28	32	29
5 Aug 2003	Election	36.3	31.0	31.5
