= 2003 Nova Scotia general election =

Canadian provincial election

← 1999	August 5, 2003	2006 →

52 seats of the Nova Scotia House of Assembly 27 seats needed for a majority
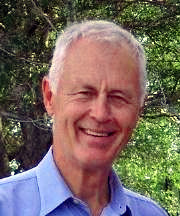

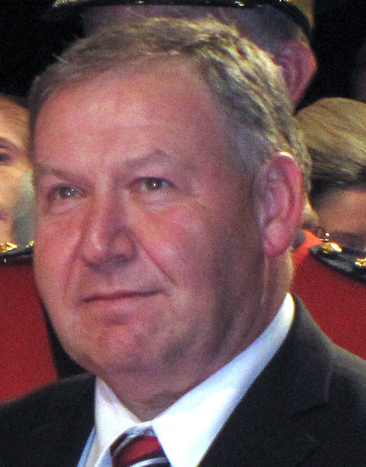
	First party	Second party	Third party
			LIB
Leader	John Hamm	Darrell Dexter	Danny Graham
Party	Progressive Conservative	New Democratic	Liberal
Leader since	October 28, 1995	June 2, 2002	April 13, 2002
Leader's seat	Pictou Centre	Cole Harbour	Halifax Citadel
Last election	30	11	11
Seats won	25	15	12
Seat change	▼5	▲4	▲1
Popular vote	148,182	126,479	128,417
Percentage	36.32%	31.00%	31.47%
Swing	▼2.88%	▲1.03%	▲1.66%
- Popular vote by riding. As this is an FPTP election, seat totals are not determined by popular vote, but instead via results by each riding.
Premier before election
John Hamm
Progressive Conservative
Premier after election
John Hamm
Progressive Conservative

The 2003 Nova Scotia general election was held on August 5, 2003, to elect members of the 59th House of Assembly of the Province of Nova Scotia, Canada. The ruling Progressive Conservative Party, led by Premier John Hamm, was reduced to a minority government.

== Campaign ==
The election was called by Progressive Conservatives, who decided to hold a rare summer election in the hope of strengthening their hold on the legislature. Running against them were the New Democratic Party (NDP), led by Darrell Dexter, and the Liberal Party, led by Danny Graham.

Hamm's party ran on a policy of fiscal management, tax cuts, and on their record of fulfilling most of their promises. While the NDP agreed in principle to tax cuts, their main cause was the creation of a public auto insurance company. The Liberals were the only party to criticize the tax cuts.

For the most part, the campaign was quiet and uneventful. Hamm received criticism for a great number of spending programs, including a $150 tax rebate cheque sent to Nova Scotians right before the election. The party was also criticized for holding an election in the summer when most people have other concerns. Darrell Dexter's friendly, non-confrontational style, was popular with many voters, and was a marked change from his party's usually strident socialism. Danny Graham, a young leader, was popular, but failed to make much of a mark.

The election was considered a mild failure for the Liberals and Progressive Conservatives, and something of a success for the NDP.

This election is also notable for being one of the last Canadian provincial elections in which British subjects could vote (a tiny number can still vote provincially in Saskatchewan if they were qualified in 1971).

== General results ==
=== Results by party ===
Party	Votes	%	+/–	Seats			
Party	Votes	%	+/–	1999	Dissolution	Seats	Seat Change
Progressive Conservative	148,182	36.32	▼2.88	30	31	25	▼5
New Democratic	126,479	31.00	▲1.03	11	11	15	▲4
Liberal	128,417	31.47	▲1.66	11	7	12	▲1
Independents	1,694	0.42	▲0.13	0	1	0	Steady
Nova Scotia Party	1,637	0.40	▼0.33	0	0	0	Steady
Marijuana	1,608	0.39	*	*	0	0	Steady
Vacant				–	2	–	–
Total	408,017	100.00	–	52	52	–	–

- The Marijuana Party did not contest the 1999 general election.

Popular vote
PC	36.32%
Liberal	31.47%
New Democratic	31.00%
Others	1.11%

Seats summary
PC	48.08%
New Democratic	28.85%
Liberal	23.08%

=== Results by region ===
Party name		HRM	C.B.	Valley	S. Shore	Fundy	Central	Total
Parties winning seats in the legislature:
Progressive Conservative	Seats:	4	2	3	7	5	4	25
Progressive Conservative	Popular vote:	30.97%	26.68%	38.41%	45.57%	50.67%	42.94%	36.32%
New Democratic Party	Seats:	11	2	-	-	1	1	15
New Democratic Party	Popular vote:	40.67%	26.21%	23.15%	25.10%	27.51%	25.59%	31.00%
Liberal	Seats:	3	5	4	-	-	-	12
Liberal	Popular vote:	27.14%	45.71%	37.13%	29.06%	20.85%	29.21%	31.47%
Parties not winning seats in the legislature:
Independents	Popular vote:	0.13%	1.40%	-	-	0.74%	0.41%	0.42%
Nova Scotia Party	Popular vote:	0.70%	-	0.75%	0.27%	0.23%	-	0.40%
Marijuana	Popular vote:	0.40%	-	0.56%	-	-	1.85%	0.39%
Total seats:		18	9	7	7	6	5	52

== Retiring incumbents ==
Liberal

- Don Downe, Lunenburg West
- Jim Smith, Cole Harbour-Eastern Passage
- Paul MacEwan, Cape Breton Nova

Progressive Conservative

- Neil LeBlanc, Argyle
- Muriel Baillie, Pictou West

New Democratic

- Robert Chisholm, Halifax Atlantic
- John Holm, Sackville-Cobequid

== Nominated candidates ==
Legend
bold denotes party leader
† denotes an incumbent who is not running for re-election or was defeated in nomination contest

=== Valley ===
Electoral district	Candidates						Incumbent
Electoral district	PC	NDP	Liberal	Nova Scotia	Marijuana	Independent	Incumbent
Annapolis	Frank Chipman; 2,795; 31.42%	Adrian Nette; 1,395; 15.68%	Stephen McNeil; 4,522; 50.83%	Harry Wilson; 185; 2.08%			Frank Chipman
Clare	Marc Boudreau; 1,456; 25.26%	Don Melanson; 760; 13.19%	Wayne Gaudet; 3,547; 61.55%				Wayne Gaudet
Digby-Annapolis	Gordon Balser; 2,339; 39.98%	Deborah Trask; 755; 12.90%	Harold Theriault; 2,666; 45.56%	Gordon D. Reid; 91; 1.56%			Gordon Balser
Hants West	Ron Russell; 3,871; 46.15%	Sean Bennett; 2,200; 26.23%	Randy Matheson; 2,118; 25.25%	Connie Brauer; 51; 0.61%	Chummy Anthony; 148; 1.76%		Ron Russell
Kings North	Mark Parent; 4,063; 50.20%	Jim Morton; 2,340; 28.91%	Michael Landry; 1,533; 18.94%		Ben Friesen; 157; 1.94%		Mark Parent
Kings South	David Morse; 3,347; 37.65%	David Mangle; 2,794; 31.43%	Maura Ryan; 2,682; 30.17%	Victor Harris; 67; 0.75%			David Morse
Kings West	Jon Carey; 2,929; 35.51%	Greg Hubbert; 2,275; 27.58%	Leo Glavine; 3,045; 36.91%				Jon Carey

=== South Shore ===
Electoral district	Candidates						Incumbent
Electoral district	PC	NDP	Liberal	Nova Scotia	Marijuana	Independent	Incumbent
Argyle	Chris d'Entremont; 2,345; 47.99%	Charles Muise; 595; 12.18%	Aldric Benoit d'Entremont; 1,946; 39.83%				Neil LeBlanc †
Chester-St. Margaret's	John Chataway; 3,451; 37.30%	Hinrich Bitter-Suermann; 3,412; 36.87%	Mitt Larsen; 2,249; 24.31%	Sue Gault; 141; 1.52%			John Chataway
Lunenburg	Michael Baker; 3,734; 46.36%	Chris Heide; 2,625; 32.59%	Jim Davis; 1,695; 21.05%				Michael Baker
Lunenburg West	Carolyn Bolivar-Getson; 3,111; 39.68%	David Ferguson; 2,180; 27.80%	John MacDonald; 2,550; 32.52%				Don Downe †
Queens	Kerry Morash; 2,721; 44.19%	Vicki Conrad; 2,300; 37.35%	Win Seaton; 1,137; 18.46%				Kerry Morash
Shelburne	Cecil O'Donnell; 3,702; 48.59%	Kendall Stoddard; 810; 10.63%	Clifford Huskilson; 3,107; 40.78%				Cecil O'Donnell
Yarmouth	Richard Hurlburt; 4,656; 56.48%	Gillian Rowley; 1,142; 13.85%	Phil DeMille; 2,446; 29.67%				Richard Hurlburt

=== Fundy-Northeast ===
Electoral district	Candidates						Incumbent
Electoral district	PC	NDP	Liberal	Nova Scotia	Marijuana	Independent	Incumbent
Colchester-Musquodoboit Valley	Brooke Taylor; 4,695; 64.34%	Kathryn Belzer; 1,694; 23.22%	Joan Barnhill; 908; 12.44%				Brooke Taylor
Colchester North	Bill Langille; 3,324; 45.12%	Garfield Forrest; 1,860; 25.25%	John Davidson; 2,183; 29.63%				Bill Langille
Cumberland North	Ernie Fage; 4,609; 61.95%	Kim Cail; 1,105; 14.85%	Marsh G. Fox; 1,389; 18.67%			Jason Blanch; 337; 4.53%	Ernie Fage
Cumberland South	Murray Scott; 4,898; 71.69%	Scott McKee; 745; 10.90%	Harriet McCready; 1,189; 17.40%				Murray Scott
Hants East	Mary Lou LeRoy; 1,640; 19.54%	John MacDonell; 4,783; 56.97%	Larry Matthews; 1,866; 22.23%	Ken Smith; 106; 1.26%			John MacDonell
Truro-Bible Hill	Jamie Muir; 3,862; 47.11%	Jim Harpell; 2,314; 28.23%	Jeff Yuill; 2,021; 24.66%				Jamie Muir

=== Central Halifax ===
Electoral district	Candidates						Incumbent
Electoral district	PC	NDP	Liberal	Nova Scotia	Marijuana	Independent	Incumbent
Halifax Chebucto	Sandy Phillips; 1,983; 23.72%	Howard Epstein; 3,682; 44.04%	Kenzie MacKinnon; 2,592; 31.00%	Scott Higgins; 103; 1.23%			Howard Epstein
Halifax Citadel	Jane Purves; 2,466; 30.27%	Peter Delefes; 2,542; 31.20%	**Danny Graham**; 3,042; 37.34%	James A. C. Marchoine; 38; 0.47%	**Michael R. Patriquen**; 59; 0.72%		Jane Purves
Halifax Clayton Park	Mary Ann McGrath; 3,034; 34.37%	Roberta Morrison; 2,312; 26.19%	Diana Whalen; 3,329; 37.71%			Greg Lavern; 152; 1.72%	Mary Ann McGrath
Halifax Fairview	Bruce MacCharles; 1,684; 22.45%	Graham Steele; 3,439; 45.85%	Susan Hayes; 2,284; 30.45%	David F. Boyd; 94; 1.25%			Graham Steele
Halifax Needham	Linda Carvery; 1,377; 18.66%	Maureen MacDonald; 3,709; 50.26%	Mike Rogers; 2,178; 29.51%	Blair Baxter; 116; 1.57%			Maureen MacDonald

=== Suburban Halifax ===
Electoral district	Candidates						Incumbent
Electoral district	PC	NDP	Liberal	Nova Scotia	Marijuana	Independent	Incumbent
Bedford	Peter G. Christie; 4,114; 43.87%	Bob Watson; 2,055; 21.92%	Richard Zurawski; 3,208; 34.21%				Peter G. Christie
Halifax Atlantic	Linda Mosher; 2,996; 33.68%	Michele Raymond; 3,327; 37.40%	Ian MacKinnon; 2,382; 26.78%	**Gerald Rodgers**; 191; 2.15%			Robert Chisholm †
Hammonds Plains Upper Sackville	Barry Barnet; 3,322; 41.14%	Brenda Haley; 2,229; 27.60%	Pam Streeter; 2,419; 29.96%		Melanie Patriquen; 105; 1.30%		Barry Barnet
Sackville-Cobequid	John Giannakos; 2,426; 28.37%	Dave Wilson; 3,881; 45.39%	Bob Harvey; 2,147; 25.11%		Michael D. Patriquen; 97; 1.13%		John Holm †
Timberlea-Prospect	Barry Fraser; 1,535; 18.25%	Bill Estabrooks; 5,049; 60.01%	Bruce Holland; 1,829; 21.74%				Bill Estabrooks
Waverley-Fall River-Beaver Bank	Gary Hines; 3,141; 37.67%	Percy Paris; 2,778; 33.31%	David E. Merrigan; 2,240; 26.86%	Heather Sawers; 94; 1.13%	Alex Neron; 86; 1.03%		Gary Hines

=== Dartmouth/Cole Harbour/Eastern Shore ===
Electoral district	Candidates						Incumbent
Electoral district	PC	NDP	Liberal	Nova Scotia	Marijuana	Independent	Incumbent
Cole Harbour	Brian Thomas; 2,387; 26.55%	**Darrell Dexter**; 4,977; 55.37%	Peter Foy; 1,523; 16.94%	Jessica Gould; 102; 1.13%			Darrell Dexter
Cole Harbour-Eastern Passage	Henry McInroy; 1,641; 24.02%	Kevin Deveaux; 3,997; 58.50%	Brian Churchill; 1,121; 16.41%	Kallee A. McPherson; 74; 1.08%			Kevin Deveaux
Dartmouth East	Terry Degen; 3,107; 34.80%	Joan Massey; 3,272; 36.65%	Debra Barlow; 2,321; 26.00%	Scott Anderson; 98; 1.10%	Hugo St-Onge; 101; 1.13%	Sebastien Theriault; 28; 0.31%	Jim Smith †
Dartmouth North	Jane MacKay; 1,900; 26.54%	Jerry Pye; 3,799; 53.06%	Rosemary Godin; 1,300; 18.16%	Pat Gould; 86; 1.20%	Marc-Andre Roy; 75; 1.05%		Jerry Pye
Dartmouth South-Portland Valley	Tim Olive; 2,813; 31.70%	Marilyn More; 3,844; 43.31%	Collin A. MacEachern; 2,218; 24.99%				Tim Olive
Eastern Shore	Bill Dooks; 3,073; 45.02%	Sid Prest; 2,427; 35.56%	Randy Carter; 1,326; 19.43%				Bill Dooks
Preston	David Hendsbee; 1,361; 32.77%	Douglas Sparks; 1,331; 32.05%	Keith Colwell; 1,411; 33.98%		Marc-Boris St-Maurice; 50; 1.20%		David Hendsbee

=== Central Nova ===
Electoral district	Candidates						Incumbent
Electoral district	PC	NDP	Liberal	Nova Scotia	Marijuana	Independent	Incumbent
Antigonish	Angus MacIsaac; 4,256; 41.64%	Terry O'Toole; 1,755; 17.17%	David Allister Cameron; 3,650; 35.71%		Gene Purdy; 560; 5.48%		Angus MacIsaac
Guysborough-Sheet Harbour	Ron Chisholm; 2,587; 37.99%	Jim Boudreau; 2,023; 29.71%	Gordon MacDonald; 2,199; 32.30%				Ron Chisholm
Pictou Centre	**John Hamm**; 4,262; 54.70%	Alexander MacIsaac; 1,571; 20.16%	Tim Daley; 1,789; 22.96%		Darryl Gallivan; 170; 2.18%		John Hamm
Pictou East	Jim DeWolfe; 3,295; 44.15%	Bob Matheson; 1,929; 25.85%	John Fraser; 2,239; 30.00%				Jim DeWolfe
Pictou West	Paul Veniot; 2,530; 32.68%	Charlie Parker; 3,410; 44.05%	Ed MacMaster; 1,639; 21.17%			Doug Corbett; 163; 2.11%	Muriel Baillie †

=== Cape Breton ===
Electoral district	Candidates						Incumbent
Electoral district	PC	NDP	Liberal	Nova Scotia	Marijuana	Independent	Incumbent
Cape Breton Centre	Rita Tighe-MacLeod; 373; 4.81%	Frank Corbett; 3,929; 50.64%	Basil McGillivray; 3,456; 44.55%				Frank Corbett
Cape Breton North	Cecil Clarke; 3,754; 43.46%	Cecil Snow; 1,714; 19.84%	Mike White; 3,169; 36.69%				Cecil Clarke
Cape Breton Nova	Todd Marsman; 684; 9.85%	Gordie Gosse; 3,168; 45.61%	Mel Crowe; 3,094; 44.54%				Paul MacEwan †
Cape Breton South	John Morrison; 1,677; 17.27%	Mike MacSween; 2,759; 28.41%	Manning MacDonald; 5,275; 54.32%				Manning MacDonald
Cape Breton West	Ivan Doncaster; 2,221; 25.51%	Douglas MacKinlay; 1,868; 21.46%	Russell MacKinnon; 4,616; 53.03%				Russell MacKinnon
Glace Bay	Mark Bettens; 1,351; 16.65%	Vince Hall; 2,342; 28.87%	Dave Wilson; 4,420; 54.48%				Dave Wilson
Inverness	Rodney MacDonald; 5,398; 51.19%	Tim Murphy; 1,277; 12.11%	Debbie Gillis; 3,871; 36.71%				Rodney MacDonald
Richmond	Richie Cotton; 1,850; 31.18%	Clair Rankin; 1,036; 17.46%	Michel Samson; 3,047; 51.36%				Michel Samson
Victoria-The Lakes	Keith Bain; 2,036; 32.48%	Nancy MacKeigan; 934; 14.90%	Gerald Sampson; 2,284; 36.44%			Brian Boudreau; 750; 11.97% Stemer MacLeod; 264; 4.21%	Brian Boudreau

== See also ==
- List of Nova Scotia general elections
- List of Nova Scotia political parties
