= Ronald Wallace (politician) =

Canadian politician (1916–2008)

Ronald Wallace MLA, C.M.
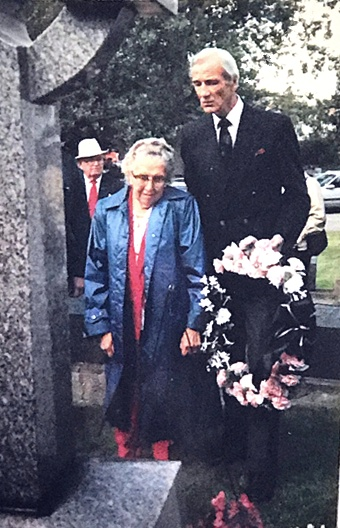
- Wallace with Titanic survivor Louise Pope at a Fairview Lawn Cemetery wreath-laying in 1991

Mayor of Halifax
- In office 1980–1991
- Preceded by: Ronald Hanson
- Succeeded by: Moira Leiper Ducharme

MLA for Halifax Citadel
- In office 1970–1978
- Preceded by: Donald MacKeen Smith
- Succeeded by: Art Donahoe

Personal details
- Born: August 5, 1916 Halifax, Nova Scotia
- Died: May 20, 2008 (aged 91) Halifax, Nova Scotia
- Party: Liberal
- Spouse: Julia Patricia McColough (m. 1948)
- Profession: optometrist

Ronald Wallace, CM (August 5, 1916 – May 20, 2008) was a Canadian politician and optometrist. Wallace is the longest-serving mayor of the city of Halifax, Nova Scotia.

Wallace was one of fifteen children born to Thomas John Wallace and Ada Evangeline Wallace, formerly MacNeil. He graduated from Saint Mary's University in 1939. He was the intercollegiate boxing champion, and a champion rower. His brother Dan was also a Maritime heavyweight boxing champion and a champion rower, and as a Rhodes scholar and rowed for Oxford University.

Wallace briefly served as Ambassador Extraordinary and Minister Plenipotentiary of the Principality of Outer Baldonia, a short-lived micronation on Outer Bald Tusket Island off the south coast of Nova Scotia.

Wallace served two terms as the Liberal member for Halifax in the Nova Scotia House of Assembly from 1970 to 1978. He was elected mayor of Halifax in 1980 and served until his retirement in 1991. He served as mayor longer than any other, and was known for his fairness, good humor and visionary approach to improving his beloved city. He was made a member of the Order of Canada in 2001.

Wallace married Julia Patricia McColough, daughter of Reginald Walker McColough, Director of Public Works for the Parliament of Canada. Together they had six children; Barbara Wallace, Suzanne Wallace, Mary Beth Wallace, Ian Wallace, Mark Wallace and Jennifer Wallace. He died at his home in Halifax on May 20, 2008, at the age of ninety-one after suffering from cancer and pneumonia.
