= Bill Black (businessman) =

Canadian businessman (born 1950)

William Black C.M.
- Born: William Black; 1950 (age 75–76); Halifax, Nova Scotia, Canada
- Education: Halifax Grammar School; Dalhousie University (BA, BSc)
- Occupation: Business executive
- Years active: 1974–present
- Employer: Maritime Life
- Known for: President and CEO of Maritime Life; business and public sector leadership
- Title: Former President and CEO of Maritime Life
- Political party: Progressive Conservative Association of Nova Scotia
- Awards: Member of the Order of Canada (C.M.) (2015)

William Black, C.M. (born 1950) is a Canadian business leader.

== Early life and education ==
Born in Halifax, Nova Scotia, Black graduated from the Halifax Grammar School. He then graduated from Dalhousie University with both a Bachelor of Arts and Bachelor of Science in 1970. He then went on to complete his actuarial training in 1974.

== Career with Maritime Life ==
He started working for Maritime Life, a company that was co-founded by his great-grandfather, William Anderson Black, in 1922. Black entered senior management at 25, and eventually became president and CEO. During his nine years as president, the company saw continuous expansion and record profits with the number of jobs in Halifax more than doubling to over 1200. By 2004 the company had 3,000 employees and $15 billion in assets under management. Under his leadership, Maritime Life gained a solid reputation for employee relations and appearing every year among the leaders in the Report on Business list of top 50 employers in Canada. When Maritime's parent company, John Hancock Financial, was purchased by Manulife, Black resigned rather than move to Ontario.

== Board experience ==
His board experience includes being chair at the Halifax Chamber of Commerce, IWK Health Centre, Symphony Nova Scotia, and the Canadian Centre for Ethics in Public Affairs. He was Lead Director of the Bank of Canada from 2008 to 2012. He has also been on the board of Dalhousie University (Vice-chair), Standard Life of Canada (deputy chair), and Nova Scotia Business Inc. He chaired a summit on the future of economic development in Halifax, and in 2008 chaired the panel reviewing pension legislation and regulation in the Province of Nova Scotia.

He currently sits on the boards of Shaw Group and the Global Risk Institute. In July 2015 he was appointed chair-designate of the Capital Markets Regulatory Authority. He has led a leadership seminar for senior executives since 2006 and is a regular columnist in the Halifax Chronicle Herald on public policy issues.

== Political career ==
He ran in the leadership race for the Progressive Conservative Association of Nova Scotia in 2006, finishing second to Rodney MacDonald. Prior to seeking the leadership, Black was nominated as the Progressive Conservative candidate for Halifax Citadel. In the 2006 election, he was defeated, losing to New Democrat Leonard Preyra by 330 votes.

== Recognition ==
In 2015, he was named a Member of the Order of Canada.
