= Leonard Preyra =

Canadian politician

The Honourable Leonard Preyra ECNS

Member of the Nova Scotia House of Assembly for Halifax Citadel-Sable Island
- In office June 13, 2006 – October 8, 2013
- Preceded by: Danny Graham
- Succeeded by: Labi Kousoulis

Personal details
- Party: New Democrat
- Occupation: professor

Leonard Preyra is a Canadian politician. He represented the riding of Halifax Citadel-Sable Island in the Nova Scotia House of Assembly from 2006 to 2013. He was a member of the Nova Scotia New Democratic Party.

== Career ==
Prior to becoming an MLA, Preyra was a professor in the political science department at Saint Mary's University in Halifax, Nova Scotia.

== Political career ==
He was first elected in the 2006 election in an open seat, defeating Progressive Conservative candidate and unsuccessful leadership candidate Bill Black.

Preyra was named the Ministerial Assistant for the Office of Immigration in June 2009. On May 30, 2012, Preyra was appointed to the Executive Council of Nova Scotia as Minister of Communities, Culture, and Heritage.

Preyra was defeated when he ran for re-election in the 2013 election.
