= Jane Purves =

Canadian politician

The Honourable Jane Purves ECNS

MLA for Halifax Citadel
- In office July 27, 1999 – August 5, 2003
- Preceded by: Peter Delefes
- Succeeded by: Danny Graham

Personal details
- Born: July 22, 1949 Halifax, Nova Scotia
- Died: June 1, 2013 (aged 63) Halifax, Nova Scotia
- Party: Progressive Conservative

Jane Stopford Purves (July 22, 1949 – June 1, 2013) was a Canadian politician, who was elected to the Nova Scotia House of Assembly in the 1999 provincial election. She represented the electoral district of Halifax Citadel as a member of the Progressive Conservatives.

== Career ==
Born in 1949 to Dr. James K.B. Purves and Mary (née Tobin) Purves, She joined The Chronicle Herald in 1974. She was a cub reporter in the Truro bureau, then rose up the ladder while working various beats before holding senior positions in the newsroom. She spent eight years as managing editor at The Chronicle Herald. In politics, she served in the Executive Council of Nova Scotia as Minister of Education, and Minister of Health. Following her defeat in the 2003 election, she was named editor of The Daily News. She remained at the paper for less than a year, resigning in October 2004, to take over as chief of staff to Nova Scotia Premier John Hamm.

== Death ==
Jane Purves died of cancer on June 1, 2013, aged 63.

== Family ==
Jane Purves is survived by her only son Thomas MacEachern and her two granddaughters Morgan and Rory MacEachern.
