= Maritime Life =

Canadian insurance company

Maritime Life Assurance Company
- Industry: Insurance
- Founded: Halifax, Nova Scotia (1922)
- Headquarters: Nova Scotia, Canada
- Number of employees: 2700 (2004)
- Website: www.maritimelife.ca

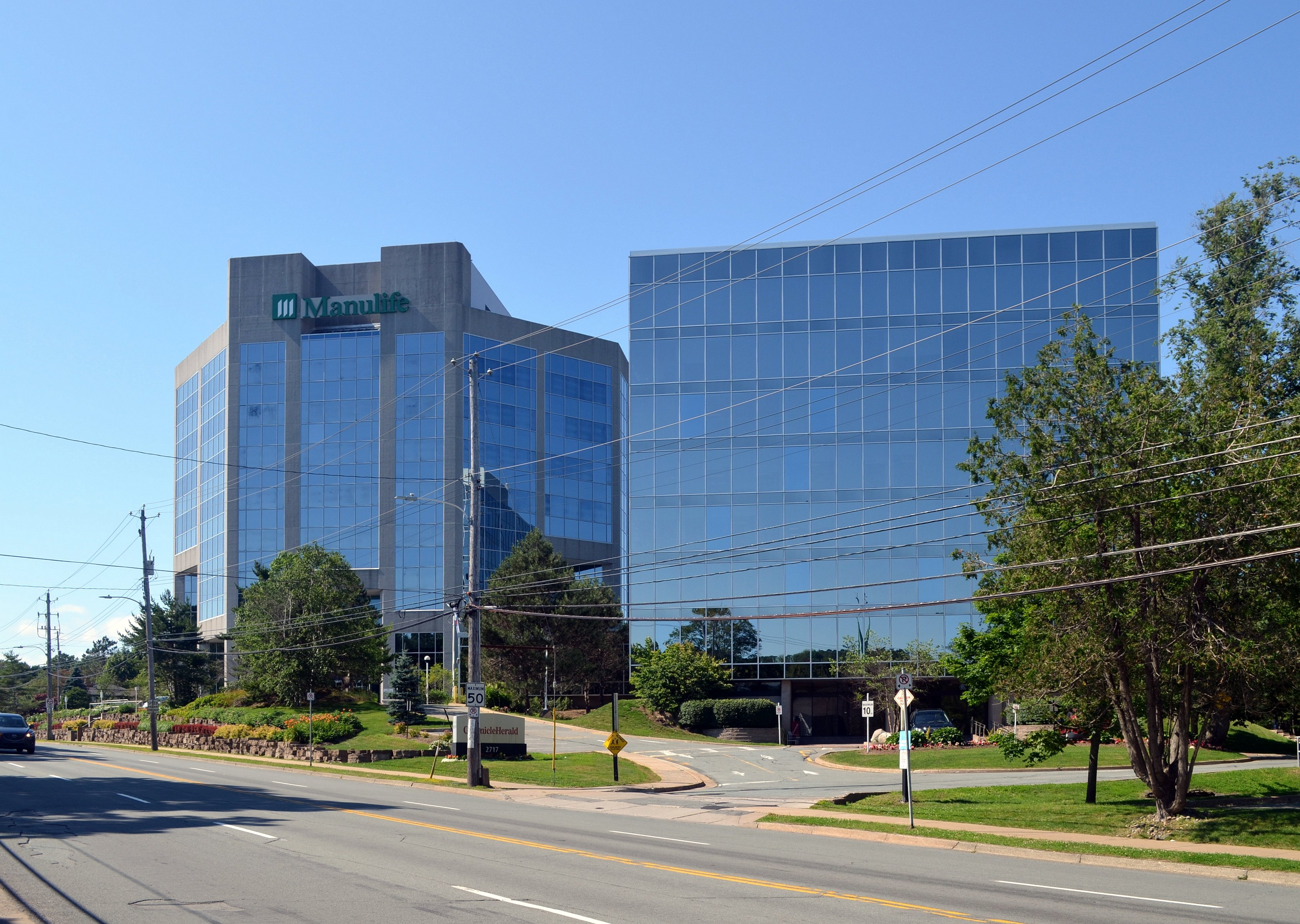
Former Maritime Life headquarters in Halifax

The Maritime Life Assurance Company was a Canadian insurance company based in Halifax, Nova Scotia, Canada. It was founded in 1922 and in 2004 it became fully integrated with Manulife Financial, with the Maritime Life brand being retired. In 2004 it had 2700 employees.

The Maritime Life headquarters was located in Armdale, Nova Scotia (part of Halifax), near the head of the Northwest Arm. After the merger with Manulife Financial, the signage of the building was changed accordingly and the facility became Manulife's central Halifax office.

== History ==
Maritime Life was co-founded in 1922 by 9 residents of Nova Scotia. At the time of its founding, the company ranked 58th out of 60 insurance companies in Canada.

One of the company's founders was The Hon. William Anderson Black, who was later elected as the member of Parliament for Halifax, from 1923 until his death in 1934. Incidentally, the last president of Maritime Life, prior to the amalgamation with Manulife Financial, was his great-grandson William "Bill" Black. In his grandfather's tradition, Bill Black ran for the leadership of the Progressive Conservative Party of Nova Scotia, but lost to Rodney MacDonald. His election bid for MLA, in the Halifax Citadel riding in 2006, was also unsuccessful.

In 1924, Maritime Life wrote its first policies and by 1933 had surpassed $1 million in assets, with that figure doubling two years later. In 1956 the company spread outside of Atlantic Canada, with a branch opening in Kingston, Ontario. Within three years, additional branches were opened in Toronto and Montreal, as well as in the smaller centres of Perth and Windsor in Ontario.

By the early 1960s, Maritime Life was one of the fastest growing insurance companies in Canada and it acquired The Royal Guardians insurance company of Montreal in 1961. Total assets for the growing company were $18.8 million.

In 1969, the John Hancock Mutual Life Insurance Company of Boston, Massachusetts purchased Maritime Life, making the company its primary Canadian subsidiary. That same year, Maritime Life won a major contract, providing insurance services for personnel of the Canadian Forces. In 1973, the company moved into a distinctive new headquarters in Halifax's Armdale neighbourhood. By the end of the decade, Maritime Life had expanded across Canada, with offices in most major centres.

By 1982, the company had approximately $1 billion in assets and in 1986, it ranked 17th out of 150 insurance companies in Canada. By 1993, it had $3.2 billion in assets, with that figure growing to $4.3 billion within two years. In 1995, Maritime Life acquired Confederation Life. In 1997, the company celebrated its 75th anniversary, with $5.5 billion in assets. In 1999, the company doubled in size, with the purchase of Aetna Life Insurance Company.

In 2001, Maritime Life purchased Royal & SunAlliance Life Insurance Company, with total assets for the company approaching $13.5 billion and net income exceeding $100 million. In 2003 it acquired the insurance business of Liberty Health and in 2004, for the fifth consecutive year, it was recognized as one of "The 50 Best Employers in Canada" as ranked by The Globe and Mail's Report on Business.

On September 29, 2003, Manulife announced its intent to acquire John Hancock Financial, including Maritime Life, for $15 billion.
