= Brooke Taylor =

Canadian politician

The Honourable Brooke Taylor ECNS

Member of the Nova Scotia House of Assembly for Colchester-Musquodoboit Valley
- In office May 25, 1993 – July 9, 2009
- Preceded by: Ken Streatch
- Succeeded by: Gary Burrill

Personal details
- Born: June 21, 1950 (age 75) Musquodoboit Valley
- Party: Progressive Conservative

Brooke Taylor (born June 21, 1950) is a Canadian politician. He represented the electoral district of Colchester-Musquodoboit Valley in the Nova Scotia House of Assembly from 1993 to 2009. He was a member of the Progressive Conservative Party of Nova Scotia.

Born in Musquodoboit Valley, Nova Scotia, Taylor was elected to Halifax County Council in 1991. He was first elected provincially in a November 1993 by-election. He was re-elected in the 1998, 1999, and 2003 general elections. In February 2006, Taylor was appointed to the Executive Council of Nova Scotia as Minister of Natural Resources. Taylor was re-elected in the 2006 election, and named Minister of Agriculture in a post-election cabinet shuffle. In January 2009, Taylor was shuffled again, becoming Minister of Transportation and Infrastructure Renewal.

On May 5, 2009, Taylor announced he was not reoffering in the 2009 election. At the time of his retirement he was the longest continuous serving Progressive Conservative MLA.
