= Nova Scotia Party =

Provincial political party in Canada

- Former provincial party
- Founded: July 30, 1997
- Dissolved: 2005
- Ideology: Populist
- Colours: Purple

The Nova Scotia Party was a populist provincial political party in Nova Scotia, Canada, founded in 1997. During its history, it was led by Jack Friis of Lawrencetown Beach, Brian Hurlburt of Yarmouth County, and finally Gerry Rodgers of Halifax.

In the 1999 provincial election, the party nominated 17 candidates in the province's 52 ridings, and won 3,153 votes, or 0.73% of the popular vote. The party campaigned on cutting government spending to pay down the province's nine billion dollar debt.

In the 2003 provincial election, under leadership of Gerry Rodgers, the party nominated 16 candidates in the province's 52 ridings, and won 1,637 votes, or 0.4% of the popular vote.

It ceased operations in 2005.

== See also ==
- List of Nova Scotia political parties
