= Danny Graham (Halifax, Nova Scotia politician) =

Canadian politician

Leader of the Nova Scotia Liberal Party
- In office April 13, 2002 – January 12, 2004
- Preceded by: Wayne Gaudet
- Succeeded by: Wayne Gaudet

MLA for Halifax Citadel
- In office August 5, 2003 – October 7, 2005
- Preceded by: Jane Purves
- Succeeded by: Leonard Preyra

Personal details
- Born: Antigonish, Nova Scotia
- Party: Liberal

Danny Graham is a lawyer and former politician in Nova Scotia, Canada.

== Early life ==
Born in Antigonish, Nova Scotia, Graham is the son of former senator Al Graham. Raised in Sydney, he attended St. Francis Xavier University where he earned the Blizzard Award and the Larkin Trophy for student achievement. He later earned his law degree at Dalhousie University.

== Career ==
Before entering politics, Graham practised as both a corporate and defence lawyer. He also worked for two years as a special adviser in the federal Justice Department.

Graham was chosen as the leader of the Nova Scotia Liberal Party from April 2002 to January 2004, and was succeeded by Francis MacKenzie. He served as the Member of the Legislative Assembly (MLA) for the riding of Halifax Citadel from August 2003 until his resignation from provincial politics on October 7, 2005.

In 2012, he became CEO of Engage Nova Scotia, a not-for-profit organization.

== Personal life ==
Graham's wife Sheelagh Nolan was diagnosed with thyroid cancer shortly after he became leader of the Liberal Party. He left provincial politics to care for her. She died on May 1, 2006.

Nolan and Graham have three sons, Patrick, Andrew, and Colin. Graham currently lives in Halifax.
