= John Hamm =

Premier of Nova Scotia from 1999 to 2006

The Honourable John Hamm OC ECNS
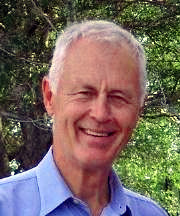
- Hamm in 2003

25th Premier of Nova Scotia
- In office August 16, 1999 – February 24, 2006
- Monarch: Elizabeth II
- Lieutenant Governor: James Kinley; Myra Freeman
- Preceded by: Russell MacLellan
- Succeeded by: Rodney MacDonald

MLA for Pictou Centre
- In office May 25, 1993 – June 13, 2006
- Preceded by: Jack MacIsaac
- Succeeded by: Pat Dunn

Personal details
- Born: John Frederick Hamm; April 8, 1938 New Glasgow, Nova Scotia, Canada
- Died: July 12, 2026 (aged 88) New Glasgow, Nova Scotia, Canada
- Party: Progressive Conservative
- Spouse: Genesta Hamm
- Occupation: Physician

John Frederick Hamm OC (April 8, 1938 – July 12, 2026) was a Canadian physician and politician who served as the 25th premier of Nova Scotia from 1999 to 2006.

== Education ==
Hamm, a graduate of the University of King's College and Dalhousie University, was a family doctor in his hometown of Stellarton, Nova Scotia, and the president of the Nova Scotia Medical Society.

== Provincial politics ==
Hamm entered politics in 1993, becoming the Member of the Legislative Assembly for the riding of Pictou Centre.

=== Leader of the Progressive Conservative Party ===
Hamm was elected leader of the Progressive Conservative Party of Nova Scotia in 1995, succeeding Terry Donahoe. His party won 14 seats in the 1998 provincial election and held the balance of power in a minority government where both the Liberal Party and the New Democratic Party, led by Russell MacLellan and Robert Chisholm, respectively, held nineteen seats.

== Premier of Nova Scotia ==
Hamm's Tories defeated the Liberal minority government on a budget vote on June 17, 1999, and in the subsequent election on July 27, 1999, Hamm was elected Premier, winning 30 of the 52 seats in the provincial legislature.

After taking office, Hamm sold or closed government-owned industries such as Sydney Steel. He invested more in education and health care, and implemented some tax cuts. His government was the first to truly balance provincial finances in 25 years, following changes in public-sector accounting practices.

In 2001, Hamm was at odds with the Nova Scotia Government Employees Union, trying to legislate nurses back to work after a legal strike.

In the 2003 election, Hamm's Progressive Conservatives were reduced to a minority government. The main issue in that election was the increasing cost of car insurance and whether Nova Scotia should begin to allow general Sunday shopping. Despite the minority government, Hamm's government was able to drop an NDP plan for government automobile insurance issue, and put the Sunday shopping issue to a province-wide plebiscite. Hamm was opposed to Sunday shopping and a public auto insurance system.

=== Atlantic Accord ===
One of his most notable achievements was negotiating with the federal government to implement the Atlantic Accord, a multi-decade regional development program that had been approved in principle during the late 1980s to prevent provincial government offshore oil and gas royalties from being included in calculations for the federal equalization program. This resulted in an $830 million payment in 2005 from the federal government, which Hamm applied against the principal on the province's long term debt, thereby reducing debt servicing payments by over $50 million annually.

=== Retirement ===
On September 29, 2005, Hamm announced his intention to retire as Premier and PC Leader. In the 2006 Progressive Conservative Association of Nova Scotia leadership election, Rodney MacDonald was elected his successor.

== After politics ==
On December 21, 2006, Hamm was appointed Chairperson of Assisted Human Reproduction Canada, a federal agency created to protect and promote the health and safety, human dignity and human rights of Canadians who use or are born of assisted human reproduction technologies, and to foster ethical principles in relation to assisted human reproduction and other related matters.

In 2009, he was made an Officer of the Order of Canada "for his contributions to the province of Nova Scotia as a former premier, family physician and community leader."

In 2010 he became the chairman of the Board of the holding company for Northern Pulp mill of Abercrombie, whose board he had joined shortly after his resignation from politics prior to the 2006 provincial election.

In May 2014 he was awarded a Doctor of Civil Law (honoris causa) from University of King's College, Halifax, Nova Scotia for his service to King's, his community and the province.

October 2014, he was awarded an "Honorary Fellow of the Royal College of Physicians and Surgeons of Canada."

Also in October 2014, John Hamm was appointed the Honorary Colonel for the 1st Battalion Nova Scotia Highlanders (North) for the next three years.

Hamm died in July 2026, at the age of 88.

Order of precedence
| Preceded by Russell MacLellan | Order of precedence in Nova Scotia as of 2009 | Succeeded by Rodney MacDonald |
