= Green Party of Nova Scotia =

Provincial political party in Canada

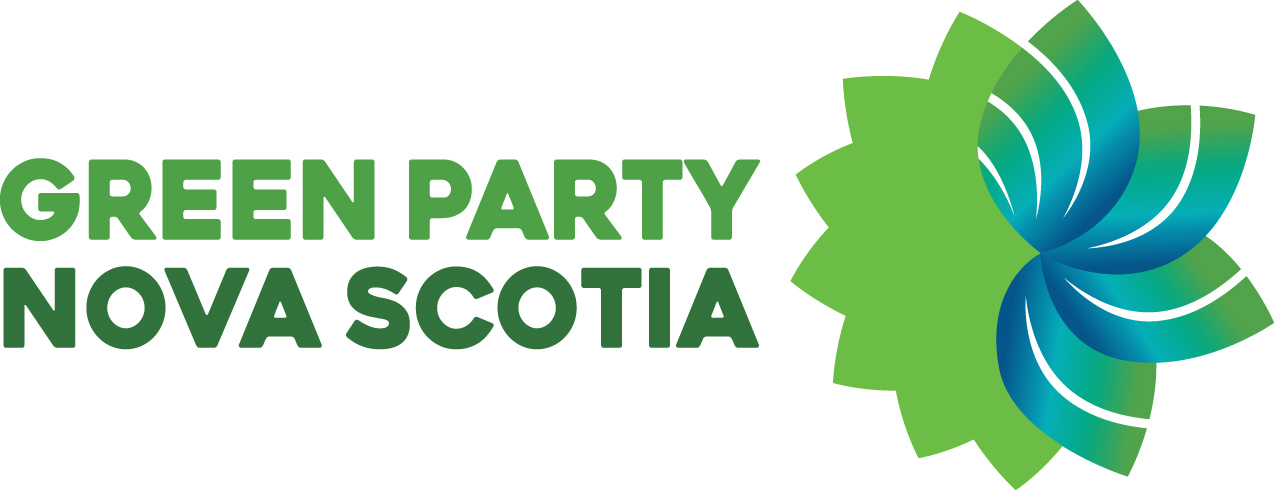
- Leader: Anthony Edmonds
- Deputy Leader: Vacant
- Founded: 2006; 20 years ago
- Headquarters: Halifax, Nova Scotia
- Membership (2021): <300
- Ideology: Green politics
- Colours: Green
- Seats in House of Assembly: 0 / 55

Website
- greenpartyns.ca

The Green Party of Nova Scotia (French: Parti Vert de la Nouvelle-Écosse) is a green political party in the Canadian province of Nova Scotia. It received official party status in the province in April 2006. The party has not won any seats in the Nova Scotia House of Assembly.

As of November 2015, it emphasized that "the Green Party embraces the Environmental Goals and Sustainable Prosperity Act (Nova Scotia) and the Nova Scotia Genuine Progress Index (GPI)...". The GPNS executive is organized regionally.

== Leadership ==
Nick Wright of Halifax, Nova Scotia won its first contested leadership nomination race over Green Party of Canada candidate and organizer Sheila Richardson of Wolfville, Nova Scotia.

In May 2007, Wright was replaced by Ken McGowan. However, he resigned in protest together with both his deputies in a constitutional struggle over unelected rival Ellen Durkee's presence on the executive. McGowan was replaced by Durkee as interim leader.

Ryan Watson was elected Leader of the Green Party of Nova Scotia on June 29, 2008. Watson, from Halifax, was unopposed and contested the 2009 Nova Scotia general election. The party failed to file financial paperwork with Elections Nova Scotia by the April deadline; however, when Watson resigned, he denied this was the reason.

On October 31, 2009, John Percy was announced as the new leader of the Green Party of Nova Scotia following a leadership contest against Sebastian Ronin. Dawna Toews was Percy's running mate and thus became Deputy Leader of the party. However, Toews moved to Ontario in early 2010 and thus resigned her position. Kris MacLellan was chosen as Deputy Leader by Executive Committee vote in October 2011, prior to the AGM. Percy made a point of emphasizing politicians of other political stripes he admired, including Joe Clark, Ed Broadbent, Stephen Lewis and Peter Stoffer.

After the 2013 Nova Scotia general election (in which it fielded only 16 candidates in 51 districts), the party was largely dormant and invisible in NS politics. Leader John Percy was also Veterans Affairs Critic in the Green Party of Canada Shadow Cabinet; this was an active file during the Stephen Harper administration until its demise in the 2015 Canadian federal election. Percy resigned in 2015 and was replaced by interim leader Brynn Nheiley.

The party was to hold a leadership convention on February 6, 2016; however, no one came forward to run for leader.

After this experience of near-collapse, Thomas Trappenberg was elected leader in November 2016. He and Deputy Leader Jessica Alexander led the party in the 2017 election, when the party ran 32 candidates and received 2.78 percent of the vote. This was the highest total ever achieved by the party, both in terms of total votes and percentage, though the party did not win any seats. Trappenburg resigned in April 2021 and was replaced by Jessica Alexander as interim leader. A leadership convention was then held in October 2021, resulting in Anthony Edmonds elected as Leader. The party did not win any seats in the 2021 Nova Scotia general election

== Conventions ==
=== Founding convention ===
The party's first convention was held on March 4–5, 2006.

At the convention, the party unanimously approved its constitution which divided powers in a way fairly conventional among Green parties: an executive controlled regional relations, regions retained control of their local policies and candidacies, and a policy committee took control of the overall platform and positions taken even during an election. The leader's role was to act as spokesperson and organize his or her most trusted critics as a Shadow Cabinet or (once elected) a Caucus. Leaders and deputies would run together on a "ticket" for continuity and to assess leader judgement of persons before they are elected to the critical role.

Members also voted to support the six principles of the Global Green Charter, elected an executive and chose a party logo.

== Leaders ==
- Nick Wright (2006-2007)
- Ken McGowan (2007-2008)
- Ellen Durkee (2008-2008; interim)
- Ryan Watson (2008-2009). Originally from British Columbia, he lives in Halifax with his wife, Shannon, and daughter Katarina. In the 2009 Nova Scotia general election he ran in the riding of Halifax Citadel-Sable Island, garnering 4.27% of the vote.
- John Percy (2009–2015)
- Brynn Nheiley (2015-2016; interim). Educated at Dalhousie and Ryerson, was the interim leader of the party during the 2015 Canadian federal election, where she contested Dartmouth—Cole Harbour and received 1,775 (3.40%) votes, ranking in last (4th) place behind Halifax Regional Councilor and winner Darren Fisher.
- Thomas Trappenberg (2016–2021)
- Jessica Alexander (2021-2021; interim)
- Anthony Edmonds (2021–present)

== Election results 2006-2021 ==
Election	Leader	Candidates	Votes	%	Seats	Place	Parliamentary position
2006	Nick Wright	52 / 52	9,411	2.33%	0 / 52	4th	Extra-parliamentary
2009	Ryan Watson	52 / 52	9,636	2.34%	0 / 52	4th	Extra-parliamentary
2013	John Percy	16 / 51	3,698	0.89%	0 / 51	4th	Extra-parliamentary
2017	Thomas Trappenberg	32 / 51	11,073	2.78%	0 / 51	4th	Extra-parliamentary
2021	Jessica Alexander	43 / 55	9,042	2.14%	0 / 55	4th	Extra-parliamentary
2024	Anthony Edmonds	23 / 55	2,961	0.8%	0 / 55	4th	Extra-parliamentary

== Election campaigns ==
In its first provincial election in 2006, less than three months after the founding convention, the party had a full slate of candidates but won only 2.33% of the popular vote (9,411 votes).

The party did not win any seats in the 2021 provincial election.

In 2024, a provincial election was called for November 26th. At the outset the party claimed through an official release that there would be a "full slate of candidates," meaning that 55 candidates would be registered. However, when nominations closed, 23 candidates were registered; this was the lowest number of candidates the party fielded since 2013.

== See also ==
- List of Green party leaders in Canada
- List of Green politicians who have held office in Canada
- List of Nova Scotia general elections
- List of political parties in Nova Scotia
- Politics of Nova Scotia
