= Joseph Zatzman =

Canadian politician

Joseph Zatzman, CM (April 12, 1912 – December 10, 2007) was a Canadian businessman and politician who served as Mayor of Dartmouth, Nova Scotia from 1964 to 1967. He was instrumental in the development of Burnside Industrial Park in the 1960s and a central thoroughfare in the Park is named Joseph Zatzman Drive in his honour.

Zatzman was the only Jewish mayor in Dartmouth's history. He was inducted as Member of the Order of Canada in October 1997.

The Dartmourth Sportsplex, an indoor sports and community centre that opened originally in 1982, was renamed the Zatzman Sportsplex in 2019 in honour of the former Mayor.

== Background ==
Born in 1912 in Saint John, New Brunswick, he was the first-born son of Louis and Ida (Fellhandler) Zatzman. He graduated from Halifax Academy and attended Dalhousie University in the Bachelor of Commerce program. When the Great Depression began, he left Dalhousie and moved to Dartmouth.

== Business career ==
In 1934, aged 22 years old, Joseph Zatzman started his career as an entrepreneur, purchasing a small grocery store on the corner of Portland St. and Victoria Rd. in Dartmouth known as Community Groceteria.

Following the sale of Community Groceteria to the Sobey family, Zatzman entered the real estate business under the name of Maplehurst Apartments, building a number of modern apartment buildings on the Dartmouth harbourfront.

During the 1930s, Zatzman became a community leader and active member of Nova Scotia's Jewish community and was recruited by the Jewish Immigration Aid Society to volunteer to help immigrants arriving at Pier 21.

By the mid-1950s, the company had more than 200 apartments and had become one of the largest property management companies in Nova Scotia. The Royal Bank building in Dartmouth and the Dartmouth Professional Centre were both managed and built by Maplehurst.

In 1956, he became president of the Dartmouth Chamber of Commerce, and the following year, he was elected to the Town Council for the first of four terms.

== Politics ==
Zatzman was elected mayor of Dartmouth in 1963, becoming the only Jewish mayor in the community's history. Zatzman's swearing-in took place in Dartmouth's Old City Hall in 1964. The ceremony was officiated by Lieutenant Governor of Nova Scotia Henry Poole MacKeen.

The signature achievement of Zatzman's mayoralty was the establishment of Burnside Industrial Park.

Following his mayoralty, Zatzman served as chairman of the Nova Scotia Resources Development Board and as vice chair of Saint Mary's University's board of governors.

Zatzman had many other community involvements and chairmanships following his time in municipal politics, including the Dartmouth Chamber of Commerce, the Atlantic Provinces Chamber of Commerce, the United Jewish Appeal, the Atlantic Jewish Council, and the Regional Authority.

== Retirement and death ==
Zatzman received an Honorary Degree from Saint Mary's in 1979, a Doctor of Laws. He was also a former Governor of the Saint Mary's Senate.

In October, 1997, he was inducted into the Order of Canada. His citation touched upon his work as Mayor, specifically around the creation of the Burnside Industrial Park, which the citation noted now represents fifty-percent of all commercial space in Atlantic Canada.

Zatzman died at the age of 95 on December 10, 2007 and was survived by sister Mrs. Liilian Aronson and children, Michael Zatzman and Karla Zatzman.

Mayor Zatzman was predeceased by his younger siblings, Mrs. Betty Astroff and Mr. Myer Zatzman, and his wife, Mrs. Leah Flam Zatzman. (Mrs. Aronson died in 2011.)

In 2019, the Dartmouth Sportsplex was renamed the Zatzman Sportsplex in honour of Mayor Zatzman.
