= Francene Cosman =

Canadian politician

The Honourable Francene Cosman ECNS

1st Mayor of Bedford
- In office 1979–1982
- Succeeded by: Keith A. Roberts

MLA for Bedford-Fall River
- In office 1993–1999
- Preceded by: new riding
- Succeeded by: Peter G. Christie

Personal details
- Born: January 14, 1941 (age 85) Windsor, Ontario
- Party: Liberal

Francene Jen Cosman (born January 14, 1941) is a former nurse, businessperson and political figure in Nova Scotia, Canada. She represented Bedford-Fall River in the Nova Scotia House of Assembly from 1993 to 1999 as a Liberal member.

Cosman was born in 1941 at Windsor, Ontario and received her R.N. from Saint John General Hospital in New Brunswick and continued her studies at the Margaret Hague school in Jersey City, New Jersey. Cosman served as a member of the municipal council for Halifax County from 1976 to 1979 and was mayor of Bedford, Nova Scotia from 1979 to 1982. She was president of the Nova Scotia Advisory Council Status of Women from 1982 to 1986.

Cosman entered provincial politics in 1993, defeating Progressive Conservative Peter J. Kelly by 393 votes in the Bedford-Fall River riding. A backbench member of the John Savage government, she served as Deputy Speaker. When Russell MacLellan took over as premier in July 1997, he appointed Cosman to the Executive Council of Nova Scotia as Minister of Community Services. Cosman was re-elected in the 1998 election, defeating Progressive Conservative Peter G. Christie by 313 votes. She retained the community services portfolio in a post-election cabinet shuffle, but was given an additional role in cabinet as Minister of Human Resources when MacLellan shuffled his cabinet in December 1998. Cosman did not reoffer in the 1999 election.
