= 2000 Halifax Regional Municipality municipal election =

The 2000 municipal elections of the Halifax Regional Municipality in Nova Scotia, Canada, took place on 21 October 2000. Elections have been held every four years since the amalgamation of the cities of Halifax and Dartmouth, the town of Bedford and Halifax County into the Halifax Regional Municipality in 1996. The regional council is made up of twenty three councillors and one mayor, all positions were up for election.

There are no political parties at the municipal level in Nova Scotia, so all candidates run as independents.

== Halifax Regional Municipality Mayor ==
HRM Total Population, 2000 Census: 390,096
Candidate	Votes	%	±
Walter R. Fitzgerald	000	000	
Peter J. Kelly	00	00	
Ken Ozmon	00	00	
Araron Peters	00	009	
Turnout	00	00	

== District 1: Eastern Shore - Musquodoboit Valley ==
Total Population, 2000 Census:
Candidate	Votes	%	±
Randy Carter	586	15.80%	
Darryl Faulkner	762	20.54%	
Steve Streatch	2343	63.17%	

== District 2: Waverley - Dutch Settlement ==
Total Population, 2000 Census:
Candidate	Votes	%	±
Stephen Boyce	1865	44.60%	
Gary Hines	2257	53.97%	

== District 3: Preston - Porter's Lake ==
Total Population, 2000 Census:
Candidate	Votes	%	±
00	00	00	
00	00	00	
00	00	00	
00	00	00	
00	00	00	
00	00	00	
Turnout	00	00	

== District 4: Cole Harbour North - Cherry Brook ==
Total Population, 2000 Census:
Candidate	Votes	%	±
00	00	00	
00	00	00	
00	00	00	
00	00	00	
00	00	00	
00	00	00	
Turnout	00	00	

== District 5: Eastern Passage - Cole Harbour South ==
Total Population, 2000 Census:
Candidate	Votes	%	±
Les MacKinnon	1467	33.57%	
Harry Mcinroy	2845	65.10%	

== District 6: Westphal - Waverley Road ==
Total Population, 2000 Census:
Candidate	Votes	%	±
00	00	00	
00	00	00	
00	00	00	
00	00	00	
00	00	00	
00	00	00	
Turnout	00	00	

== District 7: Woodlawn ==
Total Population, 2000 Census:
Candidate	Votes	%	±
Emmet Austin	1584	36.66%	
Conde Sarto	2711	62.74%	

== District 8: Woodside ==
Total Population, 2000 Census:
Candidate	Votes	%	±
00	00	00	
00	00	00	
00	00	00	
00	00	00	
00	00	00	
00	00	00	
Turnout	00	00	

== District 9: Albro Lake - Harbourview ==
Total Population, 2000 Census:
Candidate	Votes	%	±
Clint Schofield	1085	47.46%	
Jim Smith	1179	51.57%	

== District 10: Dartmouth Centre ==
Total Population, 2000 Census:
Candidate	Votes	%	±
Bernard C. Anderson	158	3.24%	
Chris Baker	979	20.07%	
Don Chard	1283	26.30%	
John Cunningham	2110	43.26%	
Carolyn Ann Vaughan	2900	5.95%	

== District 11: Halifax North End ==
Total Population, 2000 Census:
Candidate	Votes	%	±
Jerry Blumenthal	3745	83.15%	
Patrick Murphy	727	16.14%	

== District 12: Halifax Downtown ==
Total Population, 2000 Census:
Candidate	Votes	%	±
Arthur (Art) Canning	109	4.39%	
Mark Daye	349	14.06%	
Graham L. Downey	708	28.51%	
Alex MacDonald	251	10.11%	
Daniel Roukema	254	10.23%	

== District 13: Northwest Arm - South End ==
Total Population, 2000 Census:
Candidate	Votes	%	±
Hugh Pullen	1532	35.39%	
Sue Uteck	2751	63.55%	

== District 14: Connaught - Quinpool ==
Total Population, 2000 Census:
Candidate	Votes	%	±
Shelia Fougere	3471	89.14	
Daniel Williams	381	9.78%	

== District 15: Fairview - Clayton Park ==
Total Population, 2000 Census:
Candidate	Votes	%	±
00	00	00	
00	00	00	
00	00	00	
00	00	00	
00	00	00	
00	00	00	
Turnout	00	00	

== District 16: Prince's Lodge - Clayton Park West ==
Total Population, 2000 Census:
Candidate	Votes	%	±
Diana Whalen	1812	34.94%	
Bill Stone	1745	33.65%	
Debbie Hum	1607	30.99%	

== District 17: Purcell's Cove - Armdale ==
Total Population, 2000 Census:
Candidate	Votes	%	±
Jon C. Coates	348	8.01%	
Linda Mosher	2098	48.27%	
Graham Read	1858	42.75%	

== District 18: Spryfield - Herring Cove ==
Total Population, 2000 Census:
Candidate	Votes	%	±
00	00	00	
00	00	00	
00	00	00	
00	00	00	
00	00	00	
00	00	00	
Turnout	00	00	

== District 19: Upper Sackville - Beaverbank ==
Total Population, 2000 Census:
Candidate	Votes	%	±
David F. Boyd	425	9.67%	
Brad "BJ" Johns	2032	46.21%	
David E. Merrigan	1894	43.07%	

== District 20: Lower Sackville ==
Total Population, 2000 Census:
Candidate	Votes	%	±
00	00	00	
00	00	00	
00	00	00	
00	00	00	
00	00	00	
00	00	00	
Turnout	00	00	

== District 21: Bedford ==
Total Population, 2000 Census:
Candidate	Votes	%	±
Diana Fiske	1565	31.50%	
Len Goucher	2203	44.33%	
Marvin Silver	1113	22.40%	

== District 22: Hammonds Plains - Timberlea ==
Total Population, 2000 Census:
Candidate	Votes	%	±
Shawn Lahey	1064	21.38%	
Reg Rankin	2533	50.90%	
Bob Russell	1347	27.07%	

== District 23: Prospect- St. Margaret's Bay ==
Total Population, 2000 Census:
Candidate	Votes	%	±
Ken Fralick	310	6.00%	
Gary G. Meade	2049	39.68%	
Jack Mitchell	1665	32.24%	
Mary Lyn Saturley	1129	21.86%	
