= Moira Leiper Ducharme =

First female mayor of Halifax, Nova Scotia

Moira Ducharme

Mayor of Halifax
- In office 1991–1994
- Preceded by: Ronald Wallace
- Succeeded by: Walter Fitzgerald

Moira Leiper Ducharme was the first female mayor of Halifax, Nova Scotia (1991–1994).

She was previously the President of Soccer Nova Scotia.
