= Centennial Square =

Coordinates: 48°25′43″N 123°21′57″W

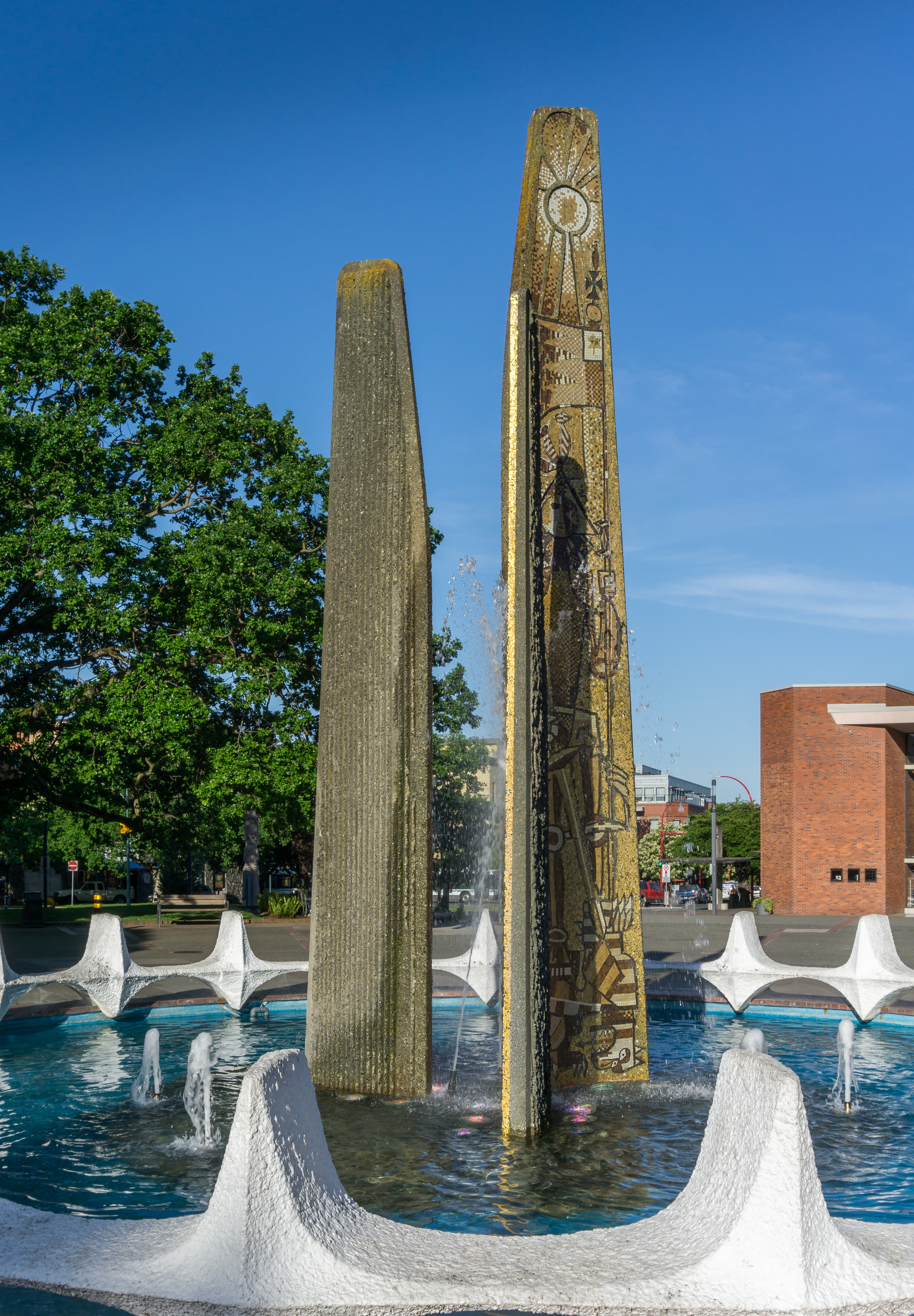
Fountain in Centennial Square, 2018

Centennial Square is a plaza in Victoria, British Columbia, Canada. It was built to celebrate the 100th anniversary of the incorporation of the City of Victoria. The Victoria Police Station, City Hall, and McPherson Playhouse are adjacent to the square. There is a fountain in the square.

In the summer, the city hires musicians to perform every weekday and charges no admission fee. For the British Columbia Day holiday, Centennial Square is one of the venues for the Victoria Electronic Music Festival, where musicians and DJs play for free.

In the winter of 2012, the Downtown Victoria Business Association temporarily set up Christmas lights, a Ferris wheel, and an ice skating rink in the square.

In 2011, Occupy Victoria protesters camped in the square until a court, at the behest of the city, ordered them to leave.
