= Bedford (provincial electoral district) =

Former provincial electoral district in Nova Scotia, Canada

Nova Scotia electoral district

Defunct provincial electoral district
- Legislature: Nova Scotia House of Assembly
- District created: 1978
- District abolished: 2021
- Last contested: 2017

Demographics
- Population (2011): 27,783
- Electors: 19,154
- Area (km²): 32.00
- Census division: Halifax Regional Municipality

Bedford was a provincial electoral district in Nova Scotia, Canada, that elected one member of the Nova Scotia House of Assembly. The electoral district was created in 1978 as Bedford-Musquodoboit Valley from the redistribution of Halifax Cobequid. The name was changed to Bedford-Fall River in 1993 and the district lost the Musquodoboit Valley area to Colchester-Musquodoboit Valley.

In 2003, the district was renamed Bedford. It lost the Fall River and Waverley areas and gained one third of Halifax Bedford Basin, as well as an area along the Hammonds Plains Road. It comprises most of Bedford and all of the community southeast of the Bicentennial Highway.

The district is notable for the electoral loss of Liberal leader Francis MacKenzie, in the 2006 election. MacKenzie attempted to win the seat in 2006 for the Nova Scotia Liberal Party. The party polled less than 24% across the province. He lost by more than 800 votes to Len Goucher.

On September 30, 2008, the name of the Bedford district was officially changed to Bedford-Birch Cove. With the 2012 electoral boundary changes, the area of Kearney Lake and Birch Cove moved to Clayton Park West and name of the district officially changed back to Bedford.

In the 2021 Nova Scotia general election, the riding was abolished into Bedford South and Bedford Basin.

== Members of the Legislative Assembly ==
This riding has elected the following members of the Legislative Assembly:

Bedford
Legislature	Years	Member	Party
Bedford-Musquodoboit Valley; District created from Halifax Cobequid (1956–1978)
52nd	1978–1981	Ken Streatch	Progressive Conservative
53rd	1981–1984	Ken Streatch	Progressive Conservative
54th	1984–1988	Ken Streatch	Progressive Conservative
55th	1988–1993	Ken Streatch	Progressive Conservative
56th	1993–1998	Francene Cosman	Liberal
57th	1998–1999	Francene Cosman	Liberal
58th	1999–2003	Peter G. Christie	Progressive Conservative
District renamed Bedford
59th	2003–2006	Peter G. Christie	Progressive Conservative
60th	2006–2009	Len Goucher	Progressive Conservative
District renamed Bedford-Birch Cove
61st	2009–2013	Kelly Regan	Liberal
District renamed Bedford
62nd	2013–2017	Kelly Regan	Liberal
63rd	2017–2021	Kelly Regan	Liberal
District dissolved into Bedford South (2021–Present) and Bedford Basin (2021–Present)

== Election results ==
=== 2017 ===
2017 Nova Scotia general election
Party	Candidate	Votes	%	±%
Liberal	Kelly Regan	5,831	52.69	-7.97
Progressive Conservative	Valerie White	3,388	30.62	+10.41
New Democratic	Blake Wright	1,362	12.31	-4.66
Green	Michealle Hanshaw	485	4.38	+2.22
Total valid votes		11,066	100	
Total rejected ballots		44	0.40	
Turnout		11,110	51.85	
Eligible voters		21,429		
Liberal hold		Swing		-9.19
Source: Elections Nova Scotia

=== 2013 ===
2013 Nova Scotia general election
Party	Candidate	Votes	%	±%
Liberal	Kelly Regan	6,081	60.66%	+16.18
Progressive Conservative	Joan Christie	2,026	20.21%	-0.54
New Democratic	Mike Poworoznyk	1,701	16.97%	-15.53
Green	Ian Charles	217	2.16%	-0.11
Total		10,025	–	
Source(s) Source: Nova Scotia Legislature (2024). "Electoral History for Bedford" (PDF). nslegislature.ca. Nova Scotia, Chief Electoral Officer (2013). 39th Provincial General Election, October 8, 2013: Volume 1 – Statement of Votes & Statistics (PDF) (Report). Elections Nova Scotia. Archived from the original (PDF) on April 10, 2018.

=== 2009 ===
2009 Nova Scotia general election: Bedford-Birch Cove
Party	Candidate	Votes	%	±%
Liberal	Kelly Regan	4,861	44.48%	10.56%
New Democratic	Brian Mosher	3,552	32.50%	11.66%
Progressive Conservative	Len Goucher	2,268	20.75%	-21.47%
Green	Neil Green	248	2.27%	-0.75%
Total		10,929	–	
Source(s) Source: Nova Scotia Legislature (2024). "Electoral History for Bedford-Birch Cove" (PDF). nslegislature.ca.

=== 2006 ===
2006 Nova Scotia general election
Party	Candidate	Votes	%	±%
Progressive Conservative	Len Goucher	4,090	42.66%	-1.21%
Liberal	Francis MacKenzie	3,286	34.28%	0.06%
New Democratic	John Buckland	2,019	21.06%	-0.86%
Green	Mary McLaughlan	192	2.00%	–
Total		9,587	–	
Source(s) Source: Nova Scotia Legislature (2024). "Electoral History for Bedford" (PDF). nslegislature.ca.

=== 2003 ===
2003 Nova Scotia general election
Party	Candidate	Votes	%	±%
Progressive Conservative	Peter G. Christie	4,114	43.87%	-13.41%
Liberal	Richard Zurawski	3,208	34.21%	15.05%
New Democratic	Bob Watson	2,055	21.92%	-1.64%
Total		9,377	–	
Source(s) Source: Nova Scotia Legislature (2024). "Electoral History for Bedford" (PDF). nslegislature.ca.

=== 1999 ===
1999 Nova Scotia general election: Bedford-Fall River
Party	Candidate	Votes	%	±%
Progressive Conservative	Peter G. Christie	6,566	57.28%	22.49%
New Democratic	Jane Earle	2,700	23.55%	-4.07%
Liberal	Gerry St. Armand	2,197	19.17%	-18.42%
Total		11,463	–	
Source(s) Source: Nova Scotia Legislature (2024). "Electoral History for Bedford-Fall River" (PDF). nslegislature.ca. Nova Scotia, Chief Electoral Officer (1999). Returns of the General Election for the House of Assembly, Thirty-Fifth General Election (Report). Elections Nova Scotia.

=== 1998 ===
1998 Nova Scotia general election: Bedford-Fall River
Party	Candidate	Votes	%	±%
Liberal	Francene Cosman	4,205	37.58%	-6.61%
Progressive Conservative	Peter G. Christie	3,892	34.79%	-5.78%
New Democratic	Marvin Silver	3,091	27.63%	12.39%
Total		11,188	–	
Source(s) Source: Nova Scotia Legislature (2024). "Electoral History for Bedford-Fall River" (PDF). nslegislature.ca.

=== 1993 ===
1993 Nova Scotia general election: Bedford-Fall River
Party	Candidate	Votes	%	±%
Liberal	Francene Cosman	4,794	44.19%	10.08%
Progressive Conservative	Peter J. Kelly	4,401	40.57%	-10.92%
New Democratic	Ryan Kidney	1,653	15.24%	0.85%
Total		10,848	–	
Source(s) Source: Nova Scotia Legislature (2024). "Electoral History for Bedford-Fall River" (PDF). nslegislature.ca. Nova Scotia, Chief Electoral Officer (1993). Returns of the General Election for the House of Assembly, Thirty-Third General Election (PDF) (Report). Queen's Printer. Archived from the original (PDF) on June 18, 2018.

=== 1988 ===
1988 Nova Scotia general election: Bedford-Musquodoboit Valley
Party	Candidate	Votes	%	±%
Progressive Conservative	Ken Streatch	5,740	51.49%	-8.48%
Liberal	Geoff Regan	3,803	34.12%	12.86%
New Democratic	Susan Coldwell	1,604	14.39%	-3.39%
Total		11,147	–	
Source(s) Source: Nova Scotia Legislature (2024). "Electoral History for Bedford-Musquodoboit Valley" (PDF). nslegislature.ca. Nova Scotia, Chief Electoral Officer (1988). Returns of the General Election for the House of Assembly, Thirty-Second General Election (PDF) (Report). Queen's Printer. Archived from the original (PDF) on July 7, 2018.

=== 1984 ===
1984 Nova Scotia general election: Bedford-Musquodoboit Valley
Party	Candidate	Votes	%	±%
Progressive Conservative	Ken Streatch	4,953	59.98%	2.36%
Liberal	John M. Dillon	1,755	21.25%	-5.00%
New Democratic	Susan Coldwell	1,468	17.78%	1.66%
Labour	Alfred Nieforth	82	0.99%	–
Total		8,258	–	
Source(s) Source: Nova Scotia Legislature (2024). "Electoral History for Bedford-Musquodoboit Valley" (PDF). nslegislature.ca. Nova Scotia, Chief Electoral Officer (1984). Returns of the General Election for the House of Assembly, Thirty-First General Election (PDF) (Report). Queen's Printer. Archived from the original (PDF) on July 31, 2017.

=== 1981 ===
1981 Nova Scotia general election: Bedford-Musquodoboit Valley
Party	Candidate	Votes	%	±%
Progressive Conservative	Ken Streatch	4,929	57.62%	-1.30%
Liberal	Dwight Isenor	2,246	26.26%	-6.39%
New Democratic	Bruce Carroll	1,379	16.12%	7.69%
Total		8,554	–	
Source(s) Source: Nova Scotia Legislature (2024). "Electoral History for Bedford-Musquodoboit Valley" (PDF). nslegislature.ca. Nova Scotia, Chief Electoral Officer (1981). Returns of the General Election for the House of Assembly, Thirtieth General Election (PDF) (Report). Queen's Printer. Archived from the original (PDF) on July 31, 2017.

=== 1978 ===
1978 Nova Scotia general election: Bedford-Musquodoboit Valley
Party	Candidate	Votes	%	±%
Progressive Conservative	Ken Streatch	4,951	58.93%	–
Liberal	Jim MacLean	2,743	32.65%	–
New Democratic	Gerald B. Hoganson	708	8.43%	–
Total		8,402	–	
Source(s) Source: Nova Scotia Legislature (2024). "Electoral History for Bedford-Musquodoboit Valley" (PDF). nslegislature.ca. Nova Scotia, Chief Electoral Officer (1978). Returns of the General Election for the House of Assembly, Twenty-Ninth General Election (PDF) (Report). Queen's Printer. Archived from the original (PDF) on June 18, 2018.

== See also ==
- List of Nova Scotia provincial electoral districts
- Canadian provincial electoral districts
