= PEN Canada =

- A Global Literary Community
- Formation: 1926
- Type: Non-profit Organization, Literary society, Lobbying
- Legal status: Association
- Headquarters: London, UK
- Location: Toronto, Canada
- Coordinates: 43.648819°N 79.402571°W
- Region served: Canada
- Official language: English
- President: Ira Wells
- Key people: Board of Directors
- Parent organization: International PEN
- Affiliations: International Freedom of Expression Exchange
- Website: pencanada.ca
- Remarks: PEN Canada is the representative of International Pen, for whole of Canada

PEN Canada is one of the 148 centres of PEN International. Founded in 1926, it has a membership of over 1,000 writers and supporters who campaign on behalf of writers around the world who are persecuted, imprisoned and exiled for exercising their right to freedom of expression.

Since its founding, various PEN Centers around the world have campaigned on behalf of such acclaimed writers as Czech playwright Václav Havel, Nobel Peace Prize winner Aung San Suu Kyi of Burma, novelist Salman Rushdie and Turkey's 2006 Nobel laureate in literature, Orhan Pamuk. PEN Canada is a member of the International Freedom of Expression Exchange network.

Over the years, PEN Canada membership has included many of the leading figures in the Canadian literary and cultural establishment, including Margaret Atwood, Adrienne Clarkson, John Ralston Saul, David Cronenberg and Yann Martel.

== Programs ==
The Writers in Prison Committee advocates on behalf of 25-30 persecuted, imprisoned and murdered writers in countries such as Myanmar, China, Iran, Turkey, Mexico, Eritrea and Uzbekistan. Since January 2003, PEN Canada has seen the release from prison of 33 Honorary Members. International PEN's Day of the Imprisoned Writer is marked on November 15. The PEN Canada One Humanity Award honours a writer, journalist, academic or PEN Canada Honorary Member outside of Canada.

The Writers in Exile Network establishes partnerships with Canadian universities, colleges and other institutions to create placements for writers who have found asylum in Canada, so that they may re-professionalize their skills in their new country. The City of Toronto/PEN Canada Writer in Exile Fellowship allows a refugee writer to be a member of the Toronto Writers' Centre for one year.

The TAXI Project and Readers & Writers "explore freedom of expression through the arts" with actors, writers in exile and established and community authors participating in schools and community readings and events.

The Canadian Issues Committee run by PEN Canada acts as a watchdog on legislation and actions in Canada that violate the right to freedom of expression guaranteed under the Canadian Charter of Rights and Freedoms.

PEN Canada also participates in Freedom to Read Week by holding events to raise awareness about freedom of expression.

== Awards and fellowships ==
=== One Humanity Award ===
The One Humanity Award has been given since 2006 to an international writer, journalist, academic, or honorary PEN member who has endured repression or shown courage in exercising their freedom of expression. The honour has been awarded to:

- Jiang Weiping (2006)
- Maung Thura, aka Zarganar (2008)
- Lydia Cacho (2009)
- Sayed Pervez Kambaksh (2010)
- Nasrin Sotoudeh (2011)
- Liu Xiaobo (2012)
- Nguyễn Văn Hải, aka Dieu Cay (2013)
- Raif Badawi (2014)
- Eskinder Nega (2015)
- Azimjon Askarov (2016)
- Ashraf Fayadh (2017)

== Presidents of PEN Canada ==
- Ira Wells (2025-present)
- Grace Westcott (2021–2025)
- Richard Stursberg (2017–2021)
- Randy Boyagoda (2015–2017)
- Philip Slayton (2013–2015)
- Charles Foran (2011–2013)
- Ellen Seligman (2009–2011)
- Nelofer Pazira (2007–2009)
- Constance Rooke (2005–2007)
- Haroon Siddiqui (2003–2005)
- Reza Baraheni (2001–2003)
- Sandra Martin (1999–2001)
- Ann Ireland (1998–1999)
- Katherine Govier (1997–1998)
- Ron Graham (1996–1997)
- Nino Ricci (1995–1996)
- Marian Botsford Fraser (1994–1995)
- Alison Gordon (1993–1994)
- Louise Dennys (1992–1993)
- John Ralston Saul (1990–1992)
- June Callwood (1989–1990)
- Graeme Gibson (1987–1989)
- Timothy Findley (1986–1987)
- Margaret Atwood (1984–1986)

== See also ==
- International PEN
- PEN America
- PEN Centre Germany
- Kurdish PEN
- International Freedom of Expression Exchange
