= List of wardens of Halifax County, Nova Scotia =

The Municipality of the County of Halifax was created in 1879. It operated from 1880 to 1996 when all municipal units in the county (including the county government) were amalgamated to form the Halifax Regional Municipality.

Wardens were chosen amongst the elected councillors at the beginning of each yearly session of the County Council.

== Wardens ==
- 1880 – Colonel John Wimburn Laurie
- 1881-1882 – Donald F. Archibald
- 1883-1888 – B.W. Chipman
- 1889-1898 – John E. Shatford
- 1899-1901 – Benjamin Curry Wilson
- 1902-1904 – George H. Madill
- 1905-1907 – Charles E. Smith
- 1908 – John H. Taylor
- 1909-1913 – William Bishop
- 1914-1919 – Charles E. Smith
- 1920-1925 – Wilson Madill
- 1926-1930 – R. A. Brenton
- 1931 – Hector M. Smiley
- 1932-1933 – John J. Hopkins
- 1934–1937 – W. W. Peverill
- 1938–1955 – William James Dowell
- 1956-1961 - Fred G. Leverman
- 1961-1964 - George D. Burris
- 1964-1979 - Ira Settle
- 1979-1982 - Elizabeth Lawrence Salton
- 1982-1988 - Arthur C. MacKenzie
- 1988-1992 - Laszlo S. Lichter

== Mayors ==
- 1992-1994 - Laszlo S. Lichter
- 1994-1996 - Randy Ball

== See also ==
- List of mayors of the Halifax Regional Municipality
- List of mayors of Halifax, Nova Scotia for a list of mayors for the City of Halifax, from 1841 to 1996.
- List of mayors of Bedford, Nova Scotia for a list of mayors for the Town of Bedford, from 1979 to 1996.
- List of mayors of Dartmouth, Nova Scotia 1873 - 1996
