= Ellen Seligman =

Ellen Jane Seligman (born February 2, 1944; died March 25, 2016) was an American-Canadian editor and publisher. She was a member of the Order of Ontario, the highest honour in the Canadian province of Ontario, and twice won the Canadian Booksellers Association Editor of the Year Award.

Seligman was born in New York City and attended the University of Wisconsin, where she received a Bachelor of Arts. She moved to Canada in 1976, where she eventually took a job with McClelland and Stewart as a senior editor and became their editorial director of fiction by 1987. During this time she worked with authors such as Margaret Atwood, Leonard Cohen, Rohinton Mistry, Michael Ondaatje, Jane Urquhart and Alice Munro, and in 2012 became the vice-president of McClelland and Stewart. At the time of her death Seligman was seen as one of Canada's top literary editors. In 2009 Seligman became the president of PEN Canada, a position she held until 2011.

Seligman died in Toronto on March 25, 2016, and was survived by partner James Polk, sister Margaret Seligman and her extended family.

== Editing ==
- Childhood, André Alexis
- Alias Grace, Margaret Atwood
- Dead Girls, Nancy Lee
- The English Patient, Michael Ondaatje
- The Underpainter, Jane Urquhart
