= Philip Slayton =

Canadian lawyer and author

Philip Slayton is a Canadian lawyer, academic, and author. He has published several books about law in Canada, including Lawyers Gone Bad: Money, Sex and Madness in Canada’s Legal Profession.

== Legal career ==
Born in England, Slayton's family emigrated to Canada when he was a child. Slayton studied law at Oxford University as a Manitoba Rhodes Scholar, and later clerked at the Supreme Court of Canada in Ottawa. He taught at McGill University and was Dean of Law at the University of Western Ontario. He practiced corporate law in Toronto with Blake, Cassels & Graydon from 1983 until his retirement in 2000.

== Literary career ==
Slayton is the author of Lawyers Gone Bad: Money, Sex and Madness in Canada’s Legal Profession, published in hard cover by Viking Press in 2007, in paperback by Penguin Group in 2008, and as an eBook in 2010. The book was not popular with lawyers or with the Canadian Bar Association. He was featured in a Maclean’s magazine cover story with the headline “Lawyers are Rats”, and the Toronto Star labeled him “Public Enemy #1” of the legal community. Maclean's noted that his interview "stirred up a great deal of controversy, including condemnation from the Canadian Bar Association, which criticized the article for "tarnish[ing] the reputation of thousands of professionals." Editorials in the National Post panned the book and criticized the Maclean's decision to feature it.

Slayton’s second book, Mighty Judgment: How the Supreme Court of Canada Runs Your Life, was published in hard cover and as an eBook in 2011 by Allen Lane, and as a paperback by Penguin in 2012.

Slayton is also a regular contributor on law-related topics to Canadian magazines and newspapers. In 2008, and again in 2010, he was awarded a Kenneth R. Wilson Memorial Award by the Canadian Business Press for his legal ethics column in Canadian Lawyer Magazine.

Slayton has received a Woodrow Wilson Fellowship and has served as President of the Canadian Rhodes Scholars Foundation and as Governor of Sheridan College. In 1998, Oxford University named him a “Distinguished Friend” of the university. Philip is a member of the Quadrangle Society of Massey College, Toronto, and the City of Toronto Legacy Project Committee, and is president of PEN Canada.

In 2014, Slayton released Bay Street, a mystery novel set in the offices of a large fictional Toronto law firm.

In 2015, Slayton released Mayors Gone Bad, exploring municipal government and issues with leadership provided by mayors in the Canadian system.

In 2020, Slayton released Nothing Left to Lose: An Impolite Report On the State of Freedom in Canada, published by Sutherland House.

== Personal life ==
Slayton is married to the writer Cynthia Wine. Together they are the founders of the Port Medway Readers' Festival, a summer literary festival on Nova Scotia’s South Shore. Philip and his daughter Gabrielle created a popular YouTube film review segment called “Gab & Dad”, in which they and guests regularly review new releases.
