= Walter Fitzgerald (politician) =

Canadian politician (1936–2014)

1st Mayor of the Halifax Regional Municipality
- In office April 1, 1996 – October 20, 2000
- Preceded by: Office established
- Succeeded by: Peter J. Kelly

Mayor of Halifax
- In office 1994–1996
- Preceded by: Moira Ducharme
- Succeeded by: Office abolished

MLA for Halifax Chebucto
- In office 1974–1981
- Preceded by: James L. Connolly
- Succeeded by: Alexa McDonough

Mayor of Halifax
- In office 1971–1974
- Preceded by: Allan O'Brien
- Succeeded by: Edmund L. Morris

Personal details
- Born: May 8, 1936 Halifax, Nova Scotia, Canada
- Died: October 11, 2014 (aged 78) Halifax, Nova Scotia, Canada
- Political party: Liberal

Walter Ronald Fitzgerald (May 8, 1936 – October 11, 2014) was a Canadian politician who served as the first Mayor of the Halifax Regional Municipality from 1996 to 2004.

== Early life and education ==
Fitzgerald was born in Halifax, Nova Scotia, the son of Phylis (Rondeau) and Walter Fizgerald. He graduated from Dalhousie University. Prior to his political career, Fitzgerald was a teacher and a former principal at Rockingstone Heights School in the Spryfield area.

== Political career ==
He was first elected alderman for Halifax, Nova Scotia, in 1966. He served as mayor of Halifax from 1971 to 1974, then as MLA for Halifax Chebucto from 1974 to 1981. He was the last mayor of the old city of Halifax from 1994 to 1996, and was the first mayor of the amalgamated Halifax Regional Municipality from 1996 to 2000. In the election of 2000, he was defeated by former Bedford mayor Peter J. Kelly.

== Death ==
He died on October 11, 2014, in the early morning hours, of heart problems at a hospital in Halifax.
