= List of mayors of Dartmouth, Nova Scotia =

The Town of Dartmouth was incorporated in 1873. Dartmouth became a City in 1961. It was independently governed by the Dartmouth Town Council until 1996 when it was amalgamated, along with the Towns of Bedford, City of Halifax and Halifax County, into the Halifax Regional Municipality.

Prior to 1931 the mayor was chosen from amongst the elected councillors by a vote of council. The first directly elected mayor was Walter Mosher.

== Mayors ==
- 1873–1875 – William S. Symonds
- 1875–1877 – George J. Troop
- 1877–1880 – William H. Weeks
- 1880–1881 – James W. Turner
- 1881–1883 – John Y. Payzant
- 1883–1885 – John F. Stairs
- 1885–1886 – John C.P. Frazee
- 1886–1887 – Byron A. Weston
- 1888–1889 – James Simmonds
- 1889–1891 – Frederick Scarfe
- 1892–1893 – John C. Oland
- 1894–1896 – William H. Sterns
- 1897–1901 – A. C. Johnson
- 1902–1905 – Frederick Scarfe
- 1906–1907 – E.F. Williams
- 1908–1912 – Thomas Notting
- 1913–1918 – E.F. Williams
- 1919–1920 – H.O. Simpson
- 1921–1922 – I.W. Vidito
- 1922–1924 – Walter Mosher
- 1925–1927 – Charles A. McLean
- 1928–1933 – Walter Mosher
- 1934–1935 – Walter A. Topple
- 1936–1937 – Walter Mosher
- 1938–1947 – L.J. Isnor
- 1948–1949 – A. C. Pettipas
- 1950–1955 – C.H. Morris
- 1956–1963 – I.W. Akerley
- 1964–1967 – Joseph Zatzman
- 1968–1972 – Roland J. Thornhill
- 1973–1975 – Eileen Stubbs
- 1976–1985 – Daniel Brownlow
- 1985–1992 – John Savage
- 1992–1996 – Gloria McCluskey

== See also ==
- List of mayors of the Halifax Regional Municipality
- List of mayors of Halifax, Nova Scotia for a list of mayors for the City of Halifax, from 1841 to 1996.
- List of mayors of Bedford, Nova Scotia for a list of mayors for the Town of Bedford, from 1979 to 1996.
- List of wardens of Halifax County, Nova Scotia for a list of wardens for Halifax County, from 1880 –1996.
