= List of mayors of Bedford, Nova Scotia =

The Town of Bedford was incorporated in 1979. It remained separate until it was incorporated with the Cities of Halifax, Dartmouth and Halifax County into the Halifax Regional Municipality in 1996.

== Mayors ==
- Francene Cosman, 1979–1982
- Keith A. Roberts, 1982–1988
- Peter Christie, 1988–1991
- Peter J. Kelly, 1991–1996

== See also ==
- List of mayors of the Halifax Regional Municipality
- List of mayors of Halifax, Nova Scotia for a list of mayors for the City of Halifax, from 1841–1996.
- List of mayors of Dartmouth, Nova Scotia for a list of mayors for the City of Dartmouth, from 1873–1996.
- List of wardens of Halifax County, Nova Scotia for a list of wardens for Halifax County, from 1880 –1996.
