= Colchester-Musquodoboit Valley =

Provincial electoral district in Nova Scotia, Canada

Nova Scotia electoral district

Provincial electoral district
- Legislature: Nova Scotia House of Assembly
MLA
Scott Armstrong
Progressive Conservative
- District created: 1978
- First contested: 1978
- Last contested: 2024

Demographics
- Population (2011): 17,979
- Electors: 13,640
- Area (km²): 3,096
- Pop. density (per km²): 5.8
- Census division(s): Colchester County, Halifax RM

Colchester—Musquodoboit Valley is a provincial electoral district in Nova Scotia, Canada, that elects one member of the Nova Scotia House of Assembly.

The district was created in 1978 from Colchester, and was called Colchester South until 1993. In 1993, the name was changed to Colchester-Musquodoboit Valley and it gained the Salmon River and Musquodoboit Valley areas from Bedford-Musquodoboit Valley, and Millbrook 27 from Truro-Bible Hill. It includes the southern half of Colchester County (not including the Truro area) plus the Musquodoboit Valley region of the Halifax Regional Municipality.

== Geography ==
The landmass of Colchester-Musquodoboit Valley is 3,096 km^{2} (1,195 sq mi).

== Members of the Legislative Assembly ==
This riding has elected the following members of the Legislative Assembly:

Colchester—Musquodoboit Valley
Legislature	Years	Member	Party
Colchester South; District created from Colchester (1867–1978)
52nd	1978–1981	R. Colin Stewart	Progressive Conservative
53rd	1981–1984	R. Colin Stewart	Progressive Conservative
54th	1984–1988	R. Colin Stewart	Progressive Conservative
55th	1988–1993	R. Colin Stewart	Progressive Conservative
District renamed Colchester-Musquodoboit Valley
56th	1993–1993	Ken Streatch	Progressive Conservative
56th	1993–1998	Brooke Taylor	Progressive Conservative
57th	1998–1999	Brooke Taylor	Progressive Conservative
58th	1999–2003	Brooke Taylor	Progressive Conservative
59th	2003–2005	Brooke Taylor	Progressive Conservative
60th	2006–2009	Brooke Taylor	Progressive Conservative
61st	2009–2013	Gary Burrill	New Democratic
62nd	2013–2017	Larry Harrison	Progressive Conservative
63rd	2017–2021	Larry Harrison	Progressive Conservative
64th	2021–2024	Larry Harrison	Progressive Conservative
65th	2024–present	Scott Armstrong	Progressive Conservative

== Election results ==
=== 2024 ===
2024 Nova Scotia general election
** Preliminary results — Not yet official **
Party	Candidate	Votes	%	±%
Progressive Conservative	Scott Armstrong	4,048	67.60	+12.47
New Democratic	Janet Moulton	1,113	18.59	-0.67
Liberal	Gwynneth "Gwyn" Bellefontaine	827	13.81	-11.81
Total valid votes		5,988	99.44	
Total rejected ballots		34	0.56	+0.16
Turnout		6,022	39.10	-13.26
Eligible voters		15,403		
Progressive Conservative hold		Swing		+12.14
Source: Elections Nova Scotia

=== 2021 ===
2021 Nova Scotia general election
Party	Candidate	Votes	%	±%	Expenditures
Progressive Conservative	Larry Harrison	4,117	55.13	+4.56	$37,087.10
Liberal	Rhonda MacLellan	1,913	25.62	-1.32	$32,423.06
New Democratic	Janet Moulton	1,438	19.26	-3.23	$36,115.07
Total valid votes/expense limit		7,468	99.60	+0.33	$83,775.96
Total rejected ballots		30	0.40	-0.33	
Turnout		7,498	52.36	+1.18	
Eligible voters		14,321			
Progressive Conservative hold		Swing		+2.94	
Source: Elections Nova Scotia

=== 2017 ===
2017 provincial election redistributed results
Party	Vote	%
Progressive Conservative	3,650	50.58
Liberal	1,944	26.94
New Democratic	1,623	22.49

2017 Nova Scotia general election
Party	Candidate	Votes	%	±%
Progressive Conservative	Larry Harrison	3,655	50.57	+8.30
Liberal	Matthew Rushton	1,947	26.94	-1.46
New Democratic	Janet Moulton	1,625	22.49	-6.84
Total valid votes		7,227	100	
Total rejected ballots		53		
Turnout		7,280	51.2	
Eligible voters		14,225		
Progressive Conservative hold		Swing		+4.88
Source: Elections Nova Scotia

=== 2013 ===
2013 Nova Scotia general election
Party	Candidate	Votes	%	±%
Progressive Conservative	Larry Harrison	3,304	42.27%	13.20%
New Democratic	Gary Burrill	2,293	29.33%	-18.11%
Liberal	Tom Martin	2,220	28.40%	7.24%
Total		7,817	–	
Source(s) Source: Nova Scotia Legislature (2024). "Electoral History for Colchester-Musquodoboit Valley" (PDF). nslegislature.ca. Nova Scotia, Chief Electoral Officer (2013). 39th Provincial General Election, October 8, 2013: Volume 1 – Statement of Votes & Statistics (PDF) (Report). Elections Nova Scotia. Archived from the original (PDF) on 10 April 2018.

=== 2009 ===
2009 Nova Scotia general election
Party	Candidate	Votes	%	±%
New Democratic	Gary Burrill	3,697	47.45%	22.39%
Progressive Conservative	Steve Streatch	2,265	29.07%	-34.39%
Liberal	Willy Versteeg	1,649	21.16%	11.80%
Green	Margaret Witney	181	2.32%	0.20%
Total		7,792	–	
Source(s) Source: Nova Scotia Legislature (2024). "Electoral History for Colchester-Musquodoboit Valley" (PDF). nslegislature.ca.

=== 2006 ===
2006 Nova Scotia general election
Party	Candidate	Votes	%	±%
Progressive Conservative	Brooke Taylor	4,790	63.46%	-0.88%
New Democratic	Gary Burrill	1,891	25.05%	1.84%
Liberal	Carolyn Matthews	707	9.37%	-3.08%
Green	Leona MacLeod	160	2.12%	–
Total		7,548	–	
Source(s) Source: Nova Scotia Legislature (2024). "Electoral History for Colchester-Musquodoboit Valley" (PDF). nslegislature.ca.

=== 2003 ===
2003 Nova Scotia general election
Party	Candidate	Votes	%	±%
Progressive Conservative	Brooke Taylor	4,695	64.34%	-3.06%
New Democratic	Kathryn Belzer	1,694	23.22%	3.59%
Liberal	Joan Barnhill	908	12.44%	-0.53%
Total		7,297	–	
Source(s) Source: Nova Scotia Legislature (2024). "Electoral History for Colchester-Musquodoboit Valley" (PDF). nslegislature.ca.

=== 1999 ===
1999 Nova Scotia general election
Party	Candidate	Votes	%	±%
Progressive Conservative	Brooke Taylor	5,465	67.40%	8.32%
New Democratic	Jim A. Harpell	1,591	19.62%	-2.99%
Liberal	Leo Stacey	1,052	12.97%	-5.33%
Total		8,108	–	
Source(s) Source: Nova Scotia Legislature (2024). "Electoral History for Colchester-Musquodoboit Valley" (PDF). nslegislature.ca. Nova Scotia, Chief Electoral Officer (1999). Returns of the General Election for the House of Assembly, Thirty-Fifth General Election (Report). Elections Nova Scotia.

=== 1998 ===
1998 Nova Scotia general election
Party	Candidate	Votes	%	±%
Progressive Conservative	Brooke Taylor	5,122	59.08%	13.00%
New Democratic	Jim A. Harpell	1,960	22.61%	14.17%
Liberal	Dick Steeves	1,587	18.31%	-21.70%
Total		8,669	–	
Source(s) Source: Nova Scotia Legislature (2024). "Electoral History for Colchester-Musquodoboit Valley" (PDF). nslegislature.ca.

=== 1993 ===
Nova Scotia provincial by-election, November 2, 1993 Resignation of Ken Streatch
Party	Candidate	Votes	%	±%
Progressive Conservative	Brooke Taylor	2,703	46.08%	0.34%
Liberal	John D. Tilley	2,347	40.01%	2.49%
New Democratic	Roger J. Hunka	495	8.44%	-8.30%
Independent	Jim McKillop	321	5.47%	–
Total		5,866	–	
Source(s) Source: Nova Scotia Legislature (2024). "Electoral History for Colchester-Musquodoboit Valley" (PDF). nslegislature.ca. Nova Scotia, Chief Electoral Officer (1993). Returns of the General Election for the House of Assembly, Thirty-Third General Election (PDF) (Report). Queen's Printer. Archived from the original (PDF) on 18 June 2018.

=== 1993 ===
1993 Nova Scotia general election
Party	Candidate	Votes	%	±%
Progressive Conservative	Ken Streatch	4,221	45.74%	-10.37%
Liberal	John D. Tilley	3,463	37.52%	1.69%
New Democratic	Roger J. Hunka	1,545	16.74%	8.68%
Total		9,229	–	
Source(s) Source: Nova Scotia Legislature (2024). "Electoral History for Colchester-Musquodoboit Valley" (PDF). nslegislature.ca. Nova Scotia, Chief Electoral Officer (1993). Returns of the General Election for the House of Assembly, Thirty-Third General Election (PDF) (Report). Queen's Printer. Archived from the original (PDF) on 18 June 2018.

=== 1988 ===
1988 Nova Scotia general election: Colchester South
Party	Candidate	Votes	%	±%
Progressive Conservative	R. Colin Stewart	3,855	56.11%	-7.75%
Liberal	Larry Thomas	2,462	35.83%	8.48%
New Democratic	Julia A. Skipper	554	8.06%	-0.73%
Total		6,871	–	
Source(s) Source: Nova Scotia Legislature (2024). "Electoral History for Colchester South" (PDF). nslegislature.ca. Nova Scotia, Chief Electoral Officer (1988). Returns of the General Election for the House of Assembly, Thirty-Second General Election (PDF) (Report). Queen's Printer. Archived from the original (PDF) on 7 July 2018.

=== 1984 ===
1984 Nova Scotia general election: Colchester South
Party	Candidate	Votes	%	±%
Progressive Conservative	R. Colin Stewart	3,572	63.85%	7.37%
Liberal	Fred A. Kennedy	1,530	27.35%	-1.62%
New Democratic	Bernard A. Gay	492	8.80%	-4.96%
Total		5,594	–	
Source(s) Source: Nova Scotia Legislature (2024). "Electoral History for Colchester South" (PDF). nslegislature.ca. Nova Scotia, Chief Electoral Officer (1984). Returns of the General Election for the House of Assembly, Thirty-First General Election (PDF) (Report). Queen's Printer. Archived from the original (PDF) on 31 July 2017.

=== 1981 ===
1981 Nova Scotia general election: Colchester South
Party	Candidate	Votes	%	±%
Progressive Conservative	R. Colin Stewart	3,281	56.48%	0.20%
Liberal	Laurence Mersereau Nason	1,683	28.97%	-9.14%
New Democratic	Chester Rice	799	13.75%	8.14%
Independent	Robert Kirk	46	0.79%	–
Total		5,809	–	
Source(s) Source: Nova Scotia Legislature (2024). "Electoral History for Colchester South" (PDF). nslegislature.ca. Nova Scotia, Chief Electoral Officer (1981). Returns of the General Election for the House of Assembly, Thirtieth General Election (PDF) (Report). Queen's Printer. Archived from the original (PDF) on 31 July 2017.

=== 1978 ===
1978 Nova Scotia general election: Colchester South
Party	Candidate	Votes	%	±%
Progressive Conservative	R. Colin Stewart	3,230	56.28%	–
Liberal	Ed Lorraine	2,187	38.11%	–
New Democratic	Chester Rice	322	5.61%	–
Total		5,739	–	
Source(s) Source: Nova Scotia Legislature (2024). "Electoral History for Colchester South" (PDF). nslegislature.ca. Nova Scotia, Chief Electoral Officer (1978). Returns of the General Election for the House of Assembly, Twenty-Ninth General Election (PDF) (Report). Queen's Printer. Archived from the original (PDF) on 18 June 2018.

== See also ==
- List of Nova Scotia provincial electoral districts
- Canadian provincial electoral districts
