= Peter G. Christie =

Canadian accountant and politician (1941–2021)

The Honourable Peter G. Christie ECNS

3rd Mayor of Bedford
- In office 1988–1991
- Preceded by: Keith A. Roberts
- Succeeded by: Peter J. Kelly

MLA for Bedford-Fall River
- In office 1999–2003
- Preceded by: Francene Cosman
- Succeeded by: Riding dissolved

MLA for Bedford
- In office 2003–2006
- Preceded by: New riding
- Succeeded by: Len Goucher

Minister of Finance
- In office August 18, 2003 – February 2006
- Premier: John Hamm
- Preceded by: Neil LeBlanc
- Succeeded by: Michael Baker

Personal details
- Born: March 9, 1941
- Died: May 31, 2021 (aged 80) Bedford, Nova Scotia, Canada
- Party: Progressive Conservative

Peter G. Christie (March 9, 1941 – May 31, 2021) was a Canadian accountant and political figure in Nova Scotia. He represented Bedford-Fall River and then Bedford in the Nova Scotia House of Assembly from 1999 to 2006 as a Progressive Conservative member.

Christie was born in Halifax and was educated at Dalhousie University. Christie is married to the former Joan Wilson. He received his designation as certified management accountant from the Canadian Society of Management Accountants and went on to serve as vice president of finance for H. H. Marshall Ltd. Christie was elected Mayor of Bedford in 1988 and served until 1991.

Christie first attempted to enter provincial politics in the 1998 election, but lost to Liberal incumbent Francene Cosman by 313 votes. He ran again in the 1999 election, winning the Bedford-Fall River riding by over 3,800 votes. In August 1999, Christie was appointed to the Executive Council of Nova Scotia as Minister of Community Services. In December 2002, Christie was shuffled to Minister of Service Nova Scotia and Municipal Relations. Following his re-election in 2003, Christie was named Minister of Finance. When Rodney MacDonald took over as premier in February 2006, Christie was left out of cabinet as he was planning to retire from politics.

Christie died in Bedford on May 31, 2021, at the age of 80.
