= Occupy Canada =

Series of protests in Canada

- Part of the Occupy movement
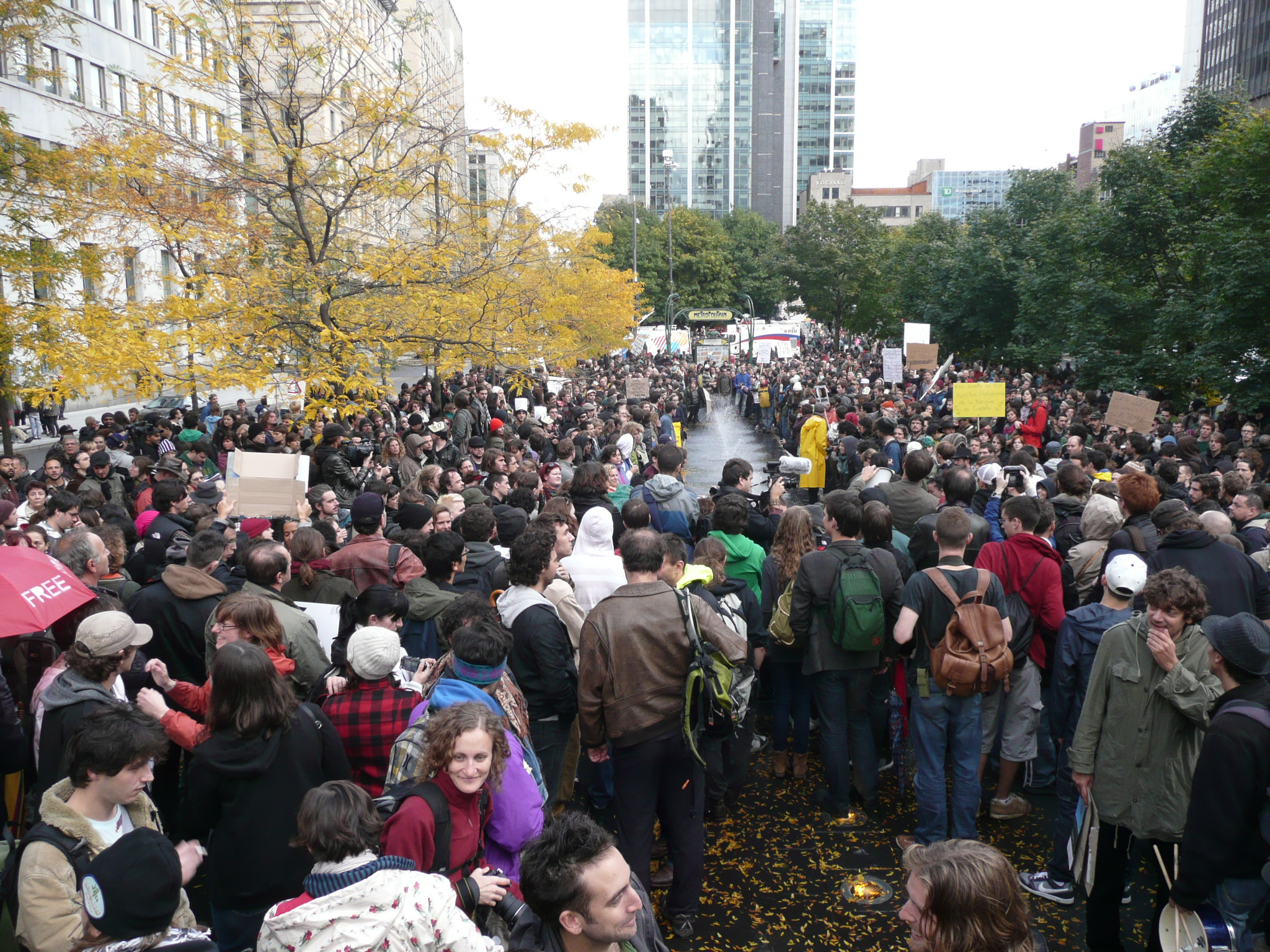
- Occupy Montreal (Occupons Montréal) on October 15, 2011
- Date: October 15, 2011 – December 13, 2012 (1 year, 1 month and 4 weeks)
- Location: Canada
- Caused by: Wealth inequality, Plutocracy, Corporate influence of government, Corporatocracy, inter alia.
- Methods: Non violent protest; Civil disobedience; Occupation; Picketing; Demonstrations; Internet activism
- Status: Failure

Number
- Vancouver: 4,000; Toronto: 3,000; Montreal: 1,000+; and multiple other cities

Casualties and losses
- Arrests: 17; Injuries: 1 Deaths: At least 1

Occupy Canada was a collective of peaceful protests and demonstrations that were part of the larger Occupy Together movement which first manifested in the financial district of New York City with Occupy Wall Street, and subsequently spread to over 900 cities around the world.

== The larger movement ==
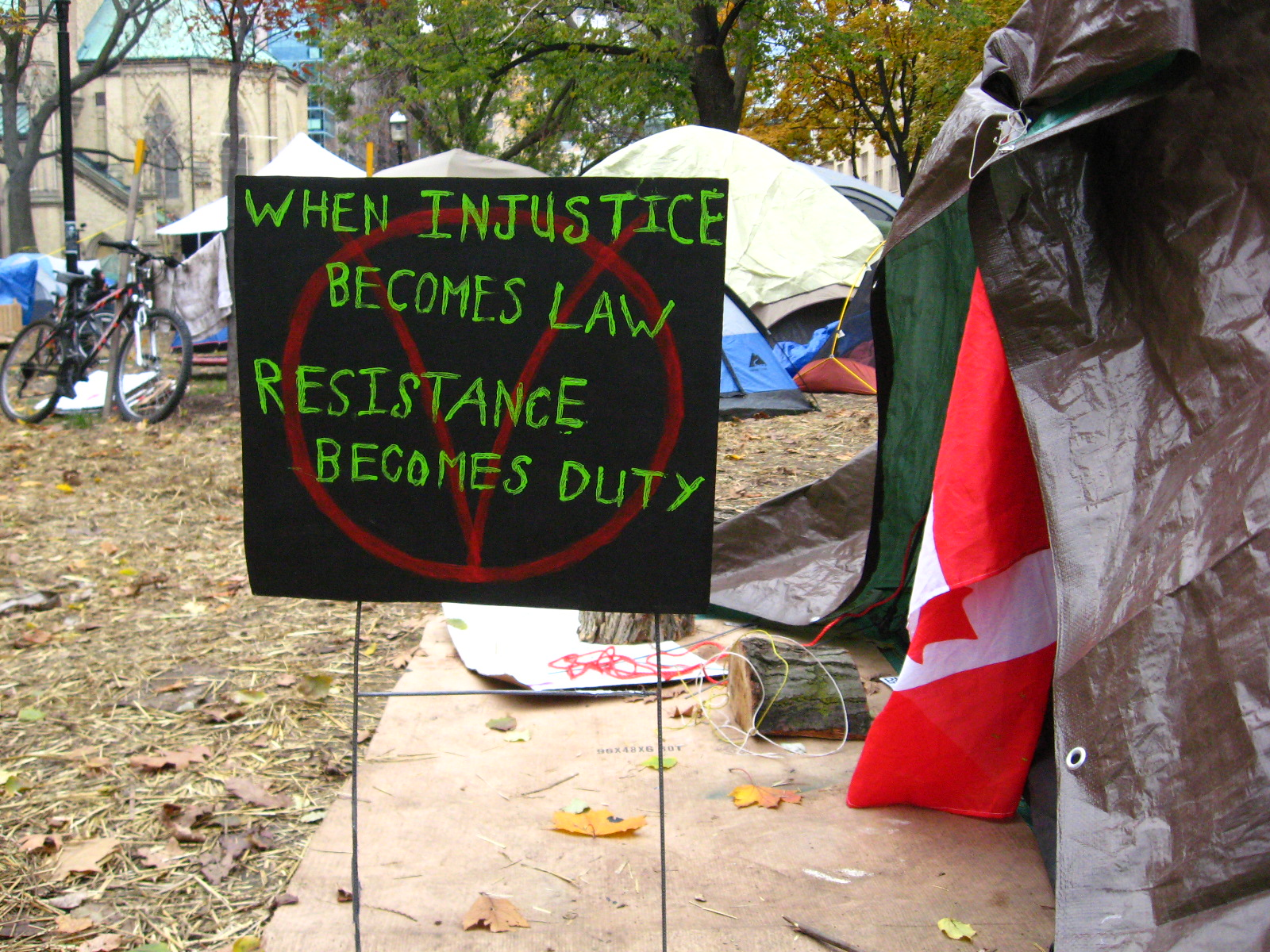
Occupy Toronto sign in St James Park

The collective protests are primarily targeting the global financial system, and also against social and economic inequality and corporate greed in general, as well as the corrupting influence of corporate money and lobbyists on government and democracy.

Characterized by leaderless, horizontally organized, participatory democratic action, and nonviolent civil disobedience, the grassroots democratic movement hopes to effect societal change to put the public good over corporate profits.

According to Armine Yalnizyan, a senior economist with the Canadian Centre for Policy Alternatives:

This is an awakening. The Occupy movement, if it succeeds, is like a kind of second chance to have that conversation we didn't have [in 2008 amid the recession]. ... Civil rights [protesters] and feminists changed societal thinking. If this movement turns into a real movement, it will change our thinking about the relationship between the rich and the rest of us. ... Occupy Wall Street is partly about Wall Street, and Bay Street, and taxes – But it's mostly about getting governments to serve the interests of the other 99%.

— Armine Yalnizyan, senior economist, Canadian Centre for Policy Alternatives

The Occupy movement originated as US Day of Rage, an idea published on the Wikileaks-endorsed news site Wikileaks Central on March 10, 2011, by Canadian editor-in-chief Heather Marsh, who modeled it after the Days of Rage being held at that time in the Middle East and North Africa. Early promotion by the Wikileaks Twitter and blog was reported as being instrumental in the group's success. It was renamed after an idea publicized on an email list and online blog July 13, 2011, by Vancouver-based non-profit Canadian group Adbusters They promoted the protest with full page ad in Adbusters #97: Post Anarchism, featuring an iconic poster of a graceful ballerina balanced atop the charging Wall Street bull, with the hashtag #OCCUPYWALLSTREET; their call to action was the spark that started the larger Occupy movement. Two young New York bloggers provided the movement's defining slogan, "We are the 99%":

The time has come to deploy this emerging stratagem against the greatest corrupter of our democracy: Wall Street, the financial Gomorrah of America

— Adbusters, on launching the occupation of New York City's financial district on September 17, 2011

The movement calls on U.S. President Barack Obama to set up a presidential commission "tasked with ending the influence money has over our representatives in Washington."

== Canadian participation in the Global Day of Action ==
For the Occupy movement's first Global Day of Action on October 15, 2011, rallies took place in 951 cities in 82 different countries around the world.

Occupy Canada rallies for the Global Day of Action took place in at least 20 Canadian cities, including:

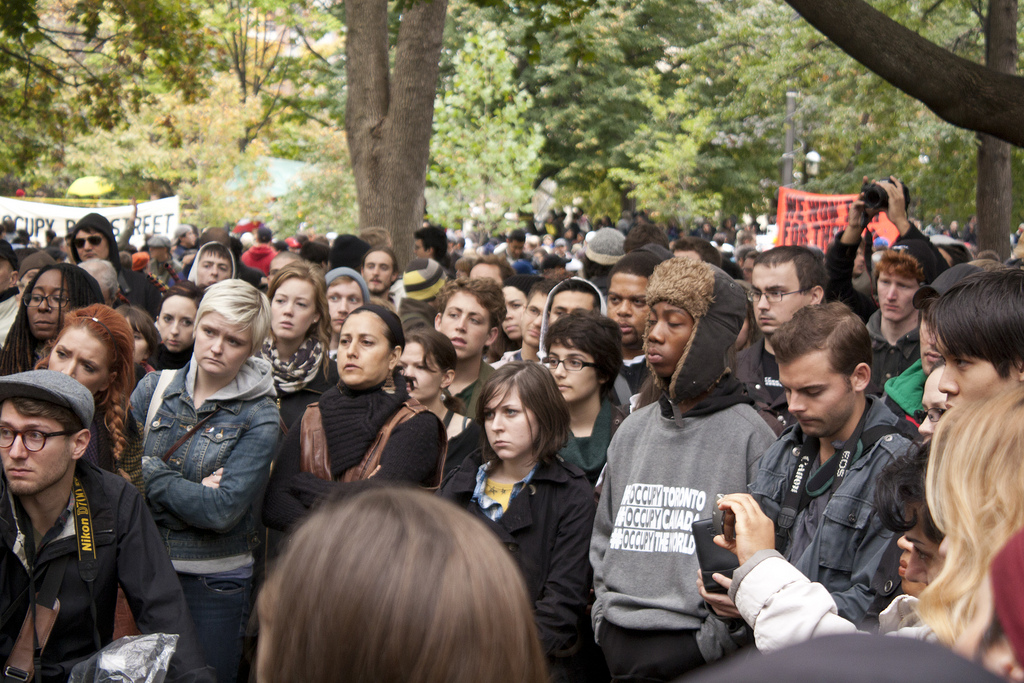
Occupy Toronto on October 15, 2011

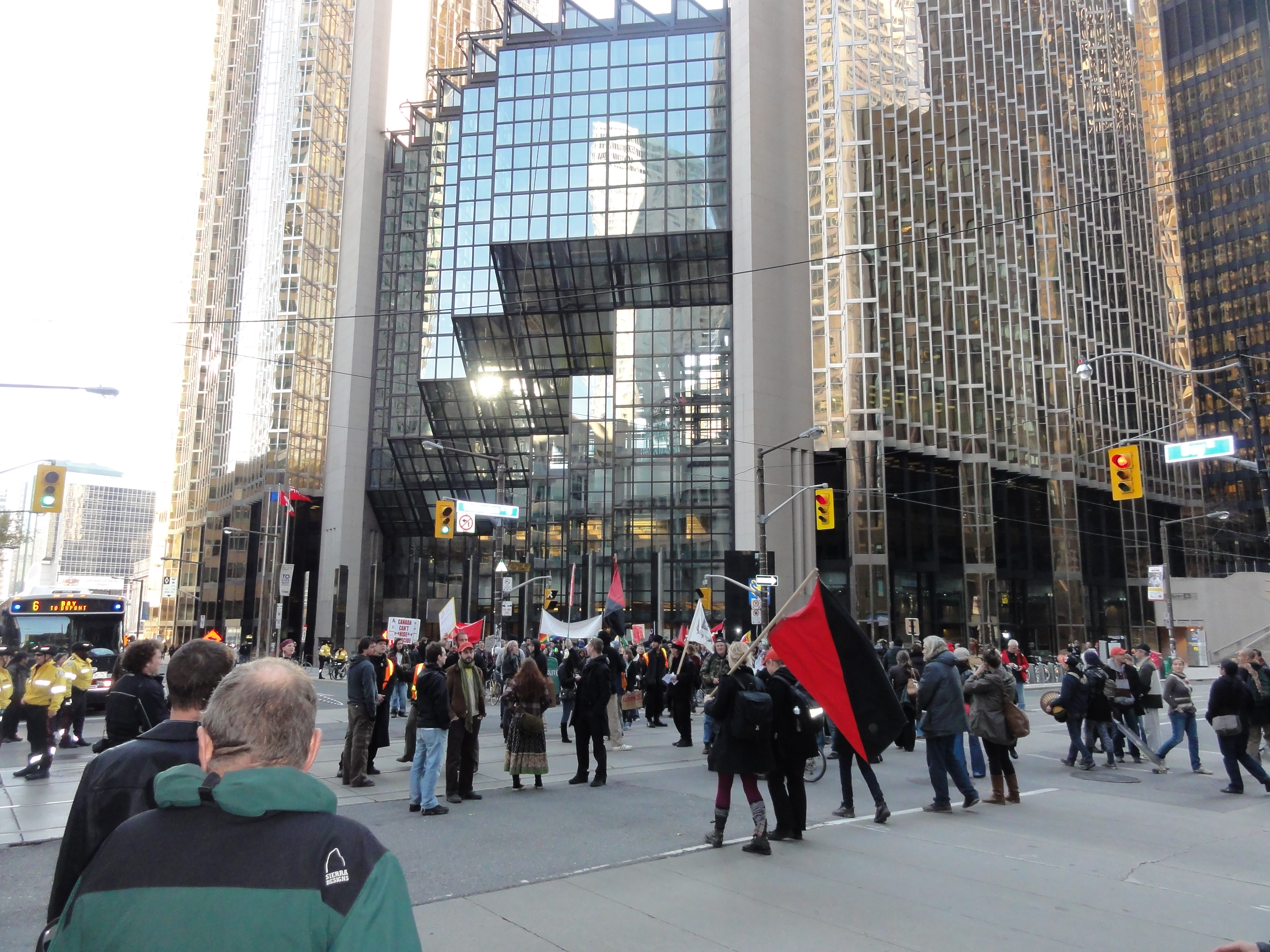
Occupy Bay Street in Toronto's Financial District

- Toronto, Ontario
- Montreal, Quebec
- Vancouver, British Columbia
- Maple Ridge, British Columbia
- Ottawa, Ontario
- Victoria, British Columbia
- Calgary, Alberta
- Edmonton, Alberta
- Saskatoon, Saskatchewan
- Regina, Saskatchewan
- Winnipeg, Manitoba
- Saint John, New Brunswick
- Moncton, New Brunswick
- St. John's, Newfoundland and Labrador
- Corner Brook, Newfoundland and Labrador
- Charlottetown, Prince Edward Island
- Halifax, Nova Scotia
- Windsor, Ontario
- London, Ontario
- Kingston, Ontario
- Sault Ste. Marie, Ontario
- Kelowna, British Columbia
- Kamloops, British Columbia
- Nanaimo, British Columbia
- Nelson, British Columbia
- Hamilton, Ontario
- Sudbury, Ontario
- Comox Valley, British Columbia
- Quebec City, Quebec

=== Occupy Toronto ===
In Toronto, around 3,000 people convened at the Financial District, which is based in the intersection of Bay Street and King Street. From there they marched to St. James Park at King and Jarvis, where around 100 people set up camping tents there and websites associated with the protest indicated that they expected to remain there for a week. Protesters stayed for over a month, until evicted on November 23.

Many refused to leave and a series of confrontations with police resulted, the library yurt was the last to be torn down, after several Occupiers fortified it and refused to leave. Several people from the camp refused to quit, continuing to live collectively as a mobile camp in locations throughout the GTA despite continuing police harassment, using specially built, small mobile living units called "occupods". Occupy Toronto combined efforts with a group of Occupy members from across the country to organize the Stop Harper rally in Ottawa, September 17, 2012, also marking the 1st anniversary of the global Occupy Movement, where they attempted to plant a vegetable garden on Parliament Hill. Politically, Occupy Toronto continues to hold meetings on a weekly basis, with 2 separate factional GAs that allow different types of activists to work with others of like mind with less conflict. include various guerilla gardening projects, such as the one on Parliament Hill in Ottawa, banner drops, the occasional flashmob and the Occupy Toronto one year reunion on Oct 15, 2012. In addition to their own actions, they have continued working with multiple other progressive organizations and helping with a number of different events and actions, including Toronto's Gay Pride Parade, pro-immigration events and a wide variety of union rallies. On May 1, 2012, Occupy Toronto were the main force behind a major joint action with unions and other organizations. As part of the rally, clergy from 3 different denominations set up a small chapel tent in St. James Park where the Occupy camp had been.

=== Occupy Montreal ===
On October 15, 2011, the global Occupy movement arrived in Montreal on its first Global Day of Action. Over 1,000 Montrealers participated at Victoria Square, a public square directly between the Montreal World Trade Centre and the Montreal Exchange, where financial derivatives are traded.

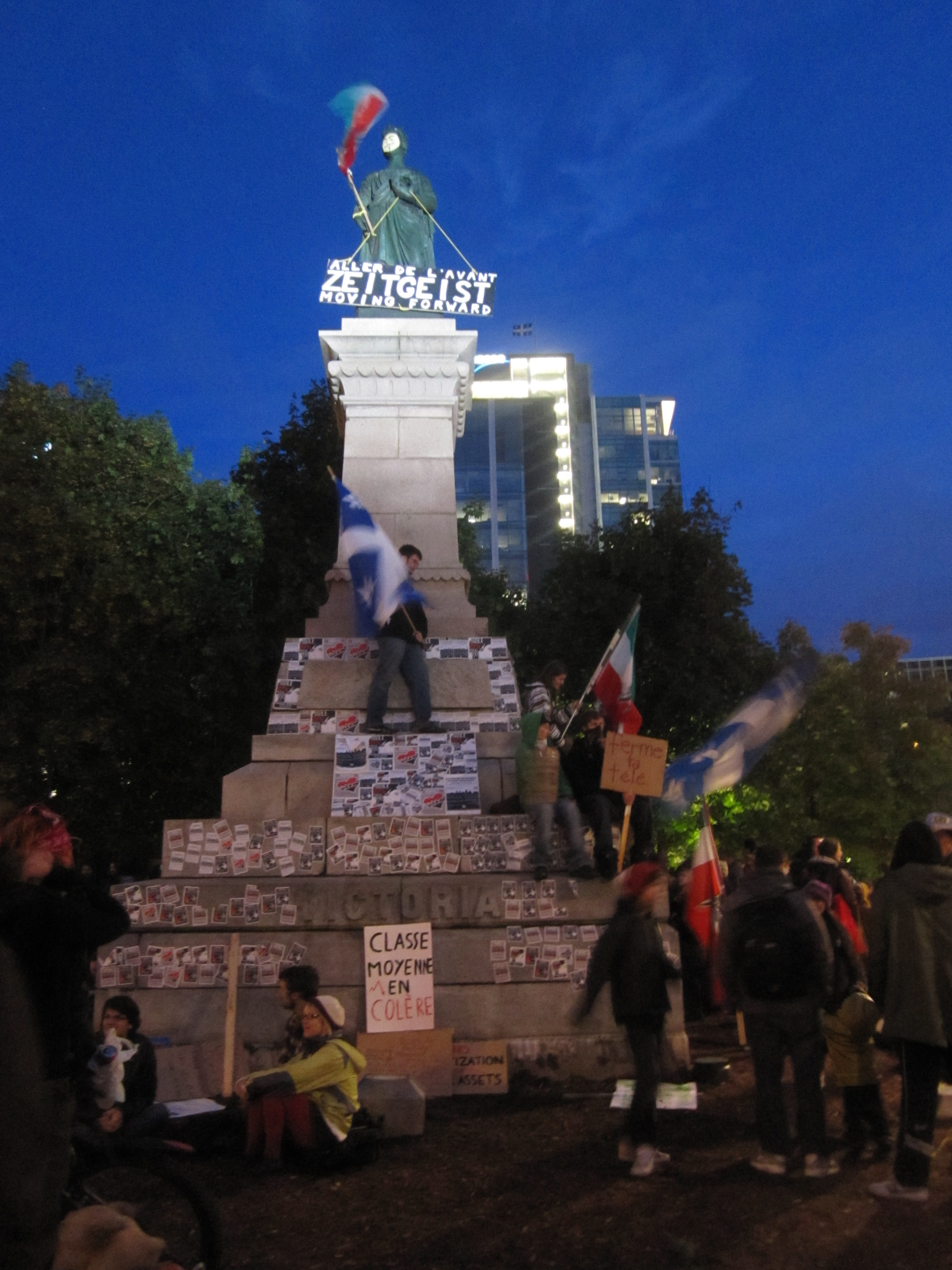
"Occupons Montréal" during the Global Day of Action at Square Victoria

The event began at 9:30, with hundreds of people arriving in the morning. By 11 a.m., the area was packed with people dancing, and tents occupied a significant portion of the green space. By late afternoon, the crowd had increased to over 1,000 people, who marched up Beaver Hall Hill and down Saint Catherine Street. 85 tents were set up at Victoria Square

Over the next five days, the occupation continued to expand and grow more complex each day. By October 20, 2011, the number of tents in Victoria Square had nearly doubled to 168, with no room to squeeze anymore in, and participants had two generators, six rented chemical toilets, canned and dried food, recycling and compost bins, and a savings fund to take the occupation through the cold winter.

On November 25, 2011, protesters were evicted from the Victoria Square by police. Some protesters tied themselves to the kitchen tent in the square and chanted at police, who eventually tore down the structure and moved protesters out. The full-scale eviction came one day after protesters were given a second notice that they had to vacate the square. Police arrested and marked protester's hands with ink that could only be seen under UV light. Protesters are considering a civil suit against police for the activity, which they have described as branding. Members from the Occupy movement moved to the gazebo on Mount Royal temporarily. Occupons Montreal was granted permission by the Darling Foundry to host their general assemblies through February 2012. The first 'official' meeting to discuss reoccupation was announced in March.

=== Occupy Vancouver ===
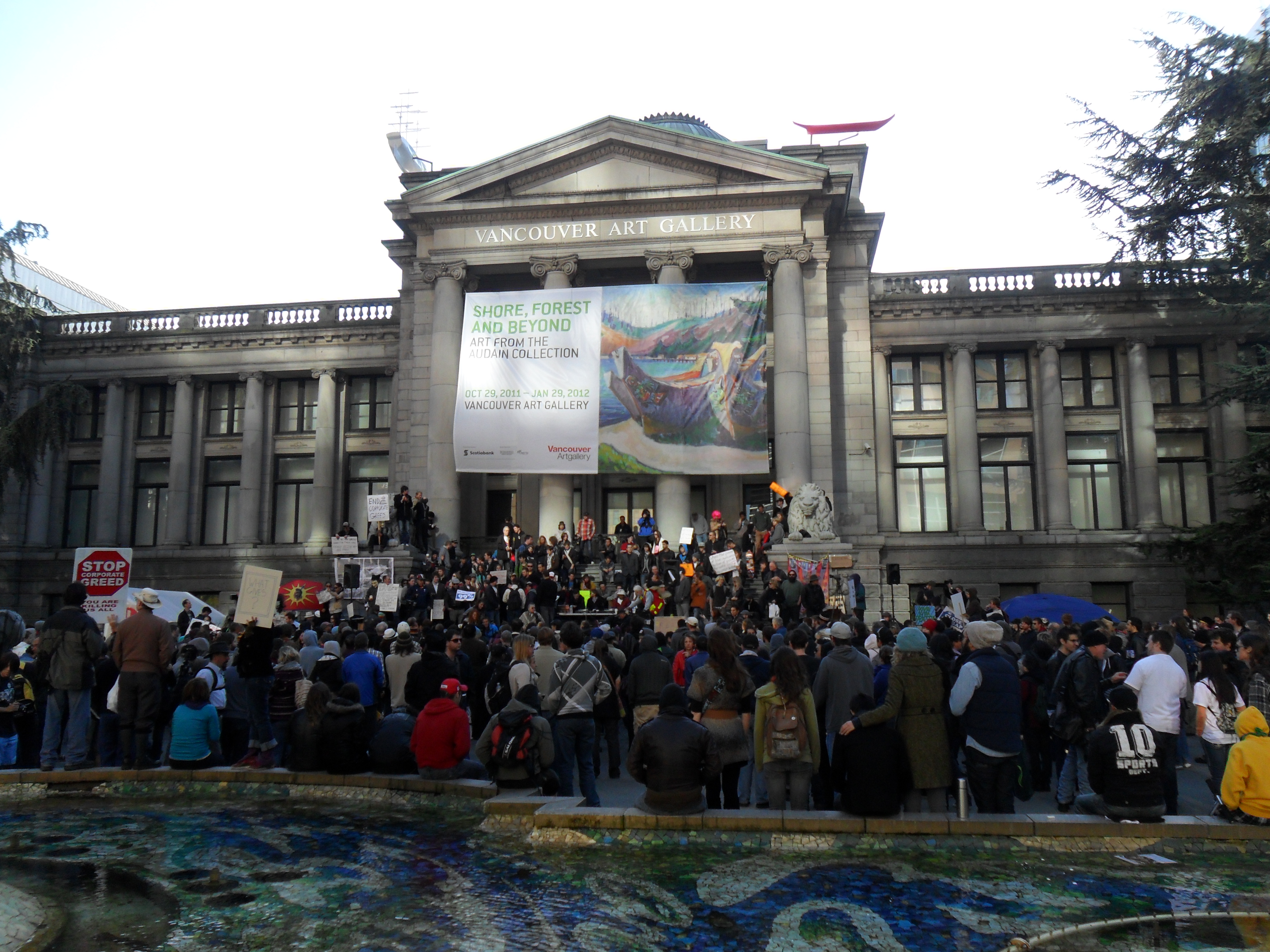
Occupy Vancouver on October 15, 2011

On October 15 in Vancouver, around 4,000 to 5000 people participated in rallies and the local general assembly. Some interpreted the unorganized and predominantly middle-class turnout at Vancouver and elsewhere to be renascent of a larger act of an anti-systemic nature rather than a social movement of activists. The days following its inception at the Vancouver Art Gallery saw the arrival of over 150 tents, food, health and safety services, operating on a volunteer basis nearly around the clock. The early encampment coincided with the public outrage against the violence perpetrated by police against protesters in Oakland, and a strong public support with which public officials did not attempt to intervene. Although spurious claims of logistical need "housing and feeding activists" were cited, the predominance of these activities compared to other occupies was due to the persistence of activists who favoured these activities, groups such as food not bombs, which were largely unrelated to the politics of the larger movement. Counter-cultural aspects of the movement, as well as its emphasis on highly demanding participatory activities prevented those who were sympathetic to the movement, from seeing themselves as part of the movement.

Drug addiction, a documented issue in the area, drew a number of those suffering from addiction to the site for its resources and accommodation. The efforts made by organizers to accommodate this population were frustrated when City Officials refused to let Insite personnel collaborate with them onsite. An increase of tension between Occupy Vancouver, City Officials, and mainstream media ensued by November 3, 2011, when a young man at the protest nearly died of a drug overdose, During the response to this overdose, the Vancouver Fire Department issued orders to correct fire code violations such as propane cylinders inside of tents and insufficient spacing between the tents. The prompt response time (less than 1 min) of an Occupy Vancouver medic saved this man's life. Despite the VFD's comments about 'difficulty' accessing the site of the emergency, these claims were disputed in court by the first responder. Occupy Medic, Mathew Kagis, felt that the VPD's claims had been greatly exaggerated and were being used as an excuse by the Mayor's office to begin a campaign of harassment against the Occupy camp, although at this point, much of the public had begun to resent the occupation's lack of attention towards broader political concerns and organizing for change, and its intensified commitment to maintaining and supplying the tent city.

On November 5, 2011, a 23-year-old woman was found unresponsive in one of the tents due to what was later confirmed as a drug overdose. Medical staff at the onsite clinic responded in less than one minute of notification, with Vancouver Fire Department and Ambulance arrival 5 and 15 min later. Gregor Robertson, the city mayor, made the comment that "Occupy has a right to continue, but the encampment must end." However, a protester by the name of Kiki, voiced in defence of the encampment to CBC that "had this drug overdose happened in an SRO in Vancouver's downtown Eastside, the mayor wouldn't have batted an eye." In the debates leading up to the civic election, mayoral candidate Suzanne Anton pressured Occupy Vancouver into a pivotal issue in the mayoral debate and aimed to remove the encampment in light of the young woman's death. Anton's attempt to galvanize the debate by taking a 'hard' stance on a nuanced and complex issue, was derailed by the nature of its tone, and its alleged political opportunism which Mayor Gregor Robertson termed as "Grandstanding" a term later applied retrospectively to members of the occupation who refused to deviate from their original talking points about the drug related death. However, public image deteriorated as the camp's inhabitants proceeded to host a concert by the punk group DOA hours after the death, causing some who were revolted at this act to leave.

On November 7, 2011, city notices asking protesters to pack up their tents immediately were posted at the site. A dispute began between the Vancouver Fire and Rescue Services crew and Occupy protesters over what was described as a sacred First Nations fire, which was intended as a provocation of Occupy's Vancouver's claims to Indigenous solidarity. Although a significant number of those present did not see the value of the symbolic demonstration, several protesters and native activists formed a circle around the fire while police officers moved in to pull them apart.

On November 15, 2011, Police, firefighters and city workers moved in and started removing several tents and tarps that were described as fire hazards. The City of Vancouver applied for an injunction order to remove the entire camp, but the judge adjourned the hearing to allow protesters to prepare their legal response. Several organizers within the camp began to coordinate the replacement of smaller tents with geodesic domes, which could fit up to 8 people, were easier to insulate against the dropping temperatures, and to better meet expressed fire codes.

On November 18, 2011, Justice Anne MacKenzie granted the city's request to order the removal of Occupy Vancouver's structures by Monday afternoon, including an order for enforcement by police. Protesters were given until 2 p.m. on November 21, 2011, to remove their tents and other structures.

On November 21, 2011, protesters abandoned the encampment at the Art Gallery zone and relocated their tents to Robson Square, just outside provincial court facilities. Justice Anne MacKenzie granted the Attorney General of British Columbia an order to remove Occupy Vancouver's new tent city by 5 p.m. November 22, 2011. Just before 5pm the tents were packed up and occupiers moved onto the SkyTrain, and over to the Commercial Drive neighbourhood where they moved into Grandview Park. A CBC journalist reported that as they moved, and marched down Commercial Drive, that those with tents numbered around several dozen people. As they met at a general assembly on arriving at the park, participators decided to shelve the tent city model of protest temporarily and to resume regular meetings at the downtown public square.

As of late January 2012, Occupy Vancouver was still holding weekly meetings at the W2 media cafe. More recently, the "work-groups" which formed the primary planning and operations functions at Occupy began hosting "pop-up" events using a number of the myriad organizing principles and ideas learned from Occupy. Students at the University of British Columbia and Simon Fraser University have begun to separately re-organize around movement-building, education, and planning for Occupy in the Spring, including a weekly appearance by The People's Lovely Library at UBC, featuring a by-donation lunch and a free store.

=== Occupy Ottawa ===
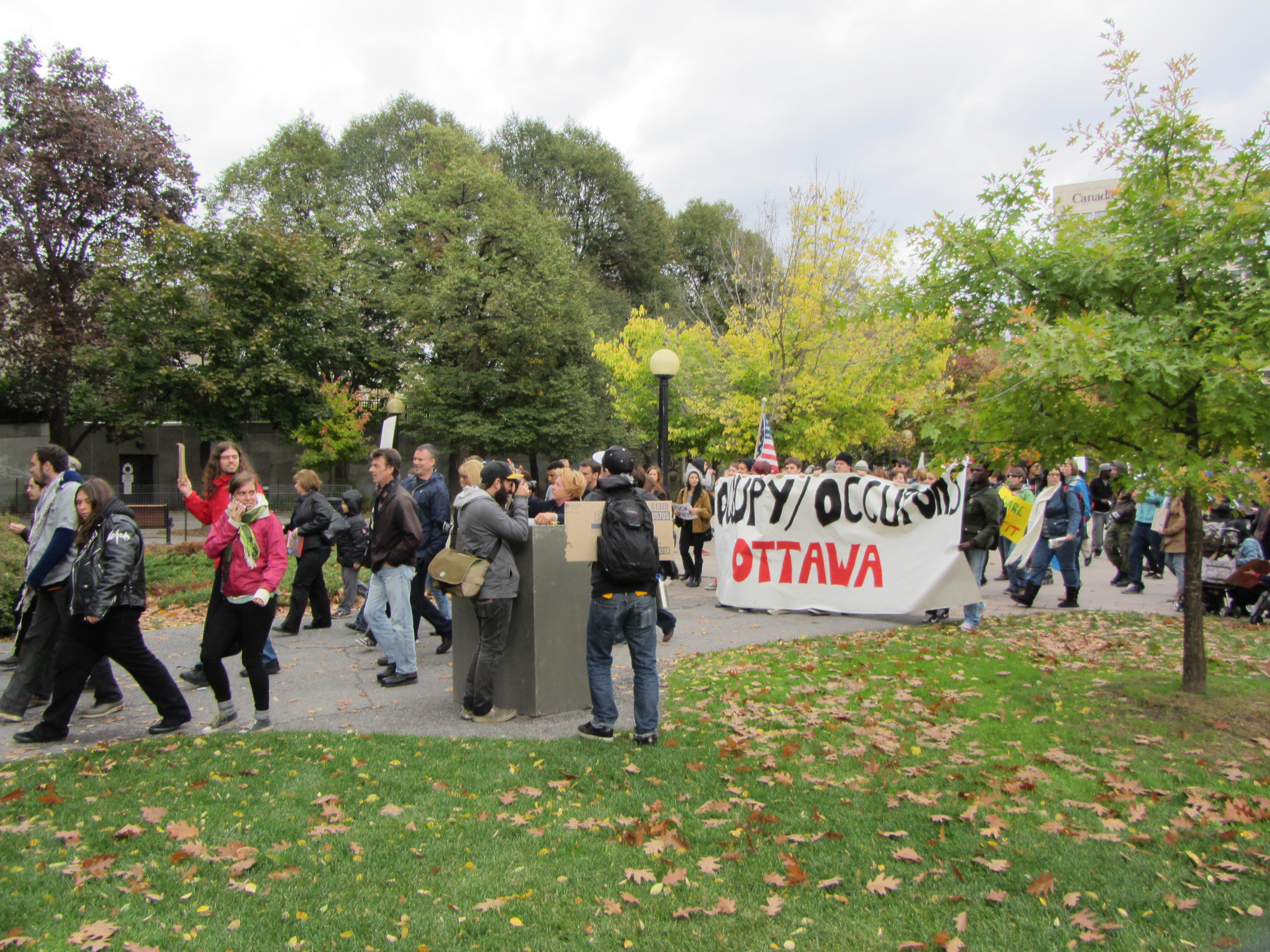
Occupy-Occupons Ottawa banner

The movement's presence in Ottawa began on Saturday October 15, 2011, with around 700 people participating at Confederation Park. A march on Sussex Drive was held the second day, passing by the U.S. embassy. Around 75 people camped in tents, with the group planning to occupy the downtown park indefinitely. Participants, prepared for the long haul, described Occupy Ottawa as a movement of presence, rather than just a protest.

On November 23, 2011, police evicted protesters from the park, ending the chapter of the protests in the city.

=== Occupy Edmonton ===
On October 15, 2011, over 1,000 people participated in an Occupy march in Edmonton, with over two dozen people spending the first night in a park in the downtown core. A tent city, complete with food, art, and medic tents, was set up with consent of the owner of the property. On November 25, 2011, campers were forced out of the park in a midnight raid by police. Since being forced out unused resources have been sent to aide Occupy Calgary's efforts.

=== Occupy Calgary ===
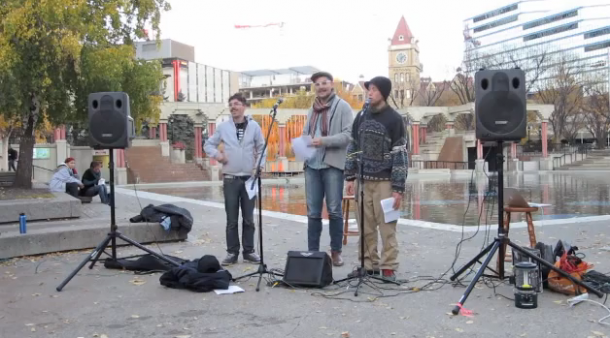
Three Occupy Calgary participants prepare to read their manifesto on Oct. 22, 2011.

On October 6, 2011, an opinions story in support of an occupation of Calgary appears in the Gauntlet newspaper, sparking local interest in the Occupy movement.

On October 13, 2011, fifty people set up an Occupy camp on the west end of St. Patrick's Island just north of the downtown core.

On October 15, 2011, about 300 people (one protester seemed to believe there were more than 400) participated in an Occupy solidarity march starting at Bankers Hall — opening with a traditional smudge ceremony and speeches from participants — moving down Stephen Avenue Mall and ending at Olympic Plaza, where additional speeches were heard and a consensus-based general assembly was held. Some forty tents were set up in Olympic Plaza that same evening.

On October 22, 2011, a concert called Occupy Arts took place at the Occupy Calgary camp in Olympic Plaza. A reading of a personal Occupy declaration "Why we Ought to Occupy" opened the event, which included multiple speeches and featured local musicians Matt Blais, The Nix Dicksons, Rica Razor Sharp, Kris Demeanor and others.

On October 29, 2011, Olympic plaza, the second camping ground of Occupy Calgary, peacefully shared the space with the Muslim Day of Heritage.

On November 7, 2011, The St. Patrick's Island camp became the first occupy camp in North America to negotiate a shutdown and peacefully disassemble. This camp reforms into a local agency, The St. Patrick's Island Co-op. A partnership is formed with The Calgary Homeless Foundation, and the Calgary Police Service.

On November 22, 2011, Calgary bylaw officers, with the supervision and assistance from the Calgary police, entered the Occupy Calgary camp and removed tents they deemed unoccupied. This left several campers, who had been out of the camp at the time, without tents to return to. Having been served with court orders on November 23, 2011, several Occupy campers and supporters appeared at the Court of Queen's Bench on December 2, 2011. The judge for the case decided that the city's injunction against Occupy Calgary would need to be reviewed, allowing the campers to continue to stay in Olympic plaza.

On December 2, 2011, Occupy Calgary was brought forward in front of Chief Justice Neil Whittman as part of the City of Calgary's attempt to have the tents removed; a non-lawyer and legal spokesperson named Ben Christensen comes to their aid and addresses the court on behalf of the group against the City of Calgary legal counsel. Initially it is proposed that the matter be adjourned, and this is quickly countered by Justice Whittman with the offer that if the matter is adjourned that the tents would have to be removed until the proposed court adjournment date. It is negotiated and offered that until the matter return to court that one single tent be allowed to remain in Olympic Plaza and that by permission of the courts that members of the group be permitted to remain overnight to supervise and secure the tent. This offer was quickly rejected by the group and some even challenged Christensen as their spokesperson. After a brief 15-minute adjournment the court proceedings continue, and a full hearing is conducted with Christensen and other members of the "Occupy Calgary" group. All parties are given a fair opportunity to be heard and to present facts and statements to counter arguments brought forward by the City of Calgary and its legal counsel. After a full day of proceedings Justice Neil Whittman reserves his judgement and declares Dec 5, 2011, that he has ruled in favour of the City of Calgary, granting the requested injunction in favour of the city. Is ordered that by 2 PM on December 9, 2011, that all tents in Olympic Plaza be removed and that any protestors choosing to defy this order are to be held in contempt of court.

Occupy Edmonton, whose camp was dismantled by police on November 25, 2011, visited the Occupy Calgary camp on December 3, 2011, bringing material and moral support in aide Occupy Calgary's efforts.

In late October, local media outlets the Calgary Sun, the Calgary Herald, 660 News and others reported that Occupy Calgary had done forty-thousand dollars in damages to Olympic Plaza park, through destruction of grass and minor vandalism of public washrooms. Campers argued that the damages to the washrooms was non-existent, and that the damage to the grass — the result of tent-pegs — was extremely minimal at most.

=== Occupy Kingston ===
On October 15, 2011, over 150 people occupied Confederation Basin, across from City Hall on Ontario St. A large yurt-like structure, built using the bandstand metal frame and tarps, contains 8-9 tents, and is divided into living and working areas. On December 6, The City of Kingston City Council voted 7–6 in favour of eviction on a motion for eviction put forward by Councillor Kevin George. Occupy Kingston relocated to Boucher Park in less than 24 hours. On December 8, Occupy Kingston and the City of Kingston came to an agreement regarding storing and moving of Occupy Kingston camping equipment. Occupy Kingston lasted 55 days, one of the last Occupy encampments in Canada.

=== Occupy Victoria ===
On October 15, 2011, an estimated 1,000 to 2,000 people marched through downtown Victoria, and a large 800-person rally took place at Centennial Square on the B.C. Legislature grounds.

The Occupy Victoria demonstrations included an event downtown organized by the PAOV, which decided a name change was necessary incurring a split between conservative individuals who had no problems with the name, and liberal individuals who did and felt it was necessary to wreck a perfectly fine branding. The People’s Assembly of Victoria and a similar demonstration organized by We Are Change Victoria that involved 500 to 1,000 people on the B.C. legislature grounds.

A tent city of at least 17 tents and 30 occupants was set up at Centennial Square, with plans to remain until the social and economic problems that prompted the Occupy movement are addressed.

Victoria Mayor Dean Fortin initial praised the PAOV movement and its international counterparts as "citizen participation and one of the emerging issues of our times," saying that "people have an urgent need to be involved in the events and process that shape their lives." Fortin later retracted his support for the protesters stating (referring to the PAOV and their tent city in Centennial Square) "I think we're coming to a place where more and more, much like Vancouver, we're getting concerned about the safety issues".

On November 5, 2011, demonstrators held a flash occupation at the intersection of Fort Street and Douglas Street, the centre of Victoria's financial district, to commemorate Bank Transfer Day. The two banks at this intersection (RBC and TD Canada Trust) temporarily shut down and locked their doors "due to protesting". Protesters cited legal, ethical and environmental violations committed by RBC and TD Canada Trust as the reasons for their occupation.

On November 6, 2011, Kate Friars, Director of Parks, Recreation and Culture, issued a letter to all occupants to vacant Centennial Square by noon on Monday, November 7, 2011.

On November 7, 2011, approximately 80 people chanted, cheered, linked arms and surrounded the main tent just before noon as they faced a deadline by the city to move their temporary structures. A few police officers stood and watched but no tickets were issued. Fortin stated the city would not make a move until his staff obtains a B.C. Supreme Court order. Fortin said he and his staff will wait and see whether the Victoria protesters will remove their tents voluntarily by the end of the week before filing for the court injunction.

On November 9, 2011, protesters were given until 4 pm, Thursday, November 10, 2011, to file a response with B.C. Supreme Court to respond to the city's eviction notice. B.C. Premier Christy Clark said "I think almost anyone would say it's time for them to go and they should go peacefully and they should go as soon as possible" According to staff at Accessprobono.ca, the PAOV (still at the time being incorrectly labelled as Occupy Victoria in spite of the name change) flooded their services requesting free legal aid for everyone, the service had to lump all of the requests together as they were numerous and an abuse of their services.

On November 16, 2011, protesters and city crews began packing up tents voluntarily as they expect the city will be granted a court injunction to remove the camp on the morning of November 17.

On November 18, 2011, Justice Terence A. Schultes ruled that the square must be vacated by 7 a.m. on Saturday, November 19, 2011. However, the judge refused to provide an immediate enforcement order, saying the demonstrators had shown "a praiseworthy degree of responsiveness to the concerns of the city".

On November 22, 2011, Victoria Police cleared out the PAOV encampment at Centennial Square of all protesters and tents and arrested one woman who refused to leave.

=== Occupy Nova Scotia ===
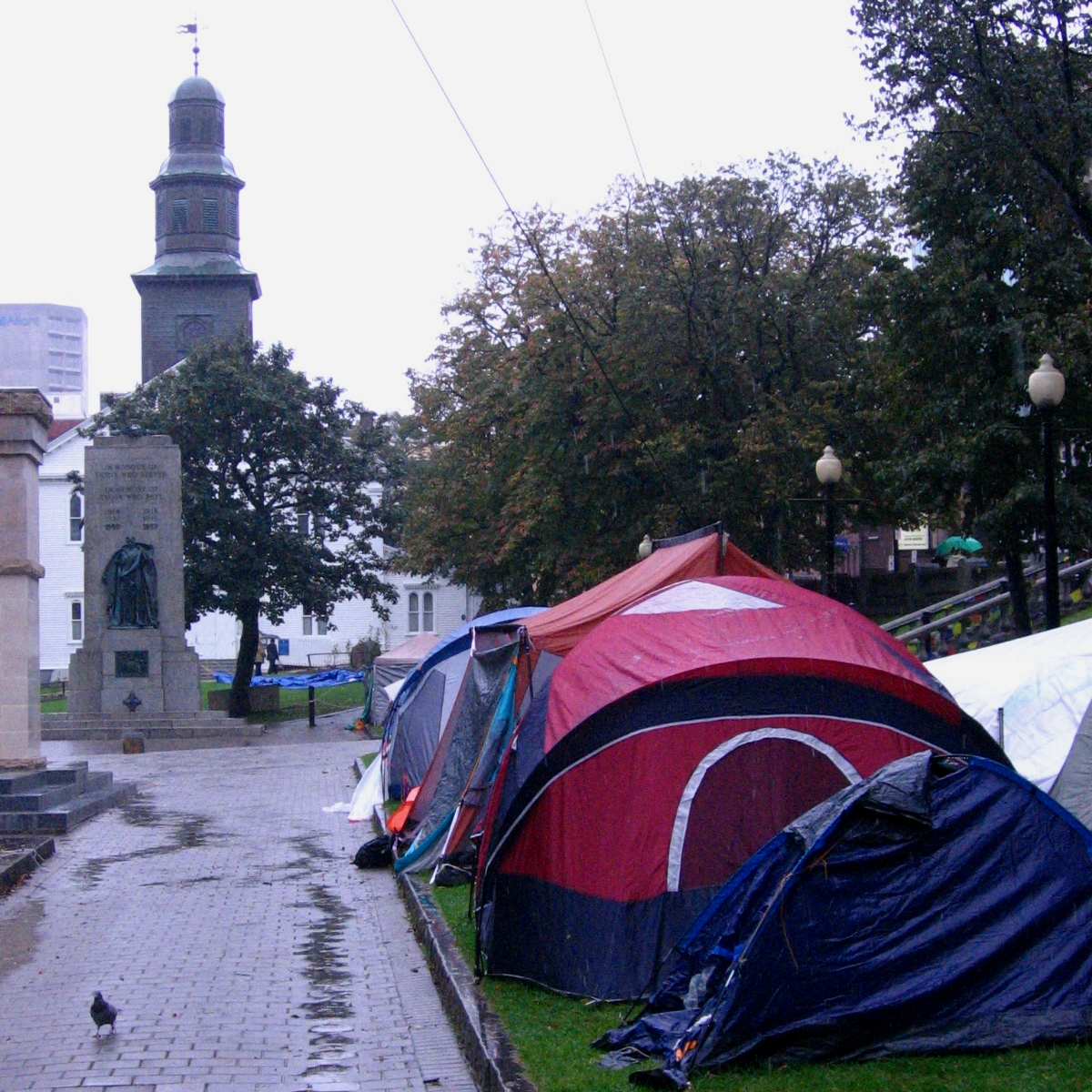
Occupy Nova Scotia camp at Halifax's Grand Parade

An Occupy Nova Scotia camp began in Halifax on October 15 at the Grand Parade between Halifax City Hall and St. Paul's Church beside the Halifax Cenotaph in Downtown Halifax. A demonstration of about 300 people began the site with about 25 tents including a medical tent, art supplies, a food and entertainment tent hosting discussion groups, art creation as well as a daily General Assembly. The first major activity were performance contributions to Halifax's Nocturne nighttime arts festival. The gathering grew to 30 tents by October 20, despite a heavy rainstorm on October 19 that destroyed several tents and caused local flooding.

On October 25, Mayor of Halifax Peter Kelly asked the occupiers to move from the Grand Parade to the Halifax Common so the area could be prepared for the Dignity Day and Remembrance Day ceremonies usually held in the square. Occupy protesters said they would seek a compromise.

On October 30, Occupy Nova Scotia participants agreed to clear the Grand Parade on November 6 and move to Victoria Park until November 12, when they would return to the Grand Parade.

On November 11, police entered Victoria Park, within minutes of the city's Remembrance Day ceremonies and served an eviction notice according to a local bylaw. They removed the tents, and arrested 14 people in a driving rain storm. The eviction of Occupy Nova Scotia from all city parks had been approved by HRM council in a secret meeting on November 8, despite Occupy Nova Scotia's agreement with the Legion and previous city offers of alternative locations. The decision by Halifax City Hall and the police to evict the protestors on a holiday weekend, minimizing public attention and resistance, cost Halifax taxpayers and extra $106,000 in overtime costs.

On November 12, three more arrests were made when hundreds of protesters filled the Grand Parade, calling for the city's mayor to resign. Several police cruisers had been stationed outside the parks to prevent people from pitching tents.

On December 2, protesters filed formal complaints against Halifax police, alleging officers used excessive force during their November 11 eviction from Victoria Park.

=== Occupy Regina ===
Joe Keithley from DOA performing a free acoustic set at the Occupy Regina camp

Occupy Regina began as a protest camp set up in downtown Regina and existed for 33 days (October 15 - November 16) until the residents were evicted and the camp dismantled by Regina Police Service. It continues to organize online and through the global occupy movement.

On October 15, 2011, protesters rallied and set up camp in Victoria Park. In the following weeks, approximately 30 tents and 60 occupants kept a nighttime vigil. On October 19, power was shut off to the park.

On 28 October, the punk musician Joe Keithley visited protesters at the Victoria Park camp and played a solo-acoustic set for them. Occupiers and media were given two days' notice when Keithley posted his intentions on Twitter, which was shared on various blogs and over Facebook.

Around this time, reporters became aware that activist Daniel Johnson, a rural candidate for the Green Party Of Saskatchewan in the upcoming election, was one of the organizers and was living in the camp, and a number of stories centered on him and that he had abandoned his campaign to stay at the camp without removing his name from the ballot. On November 5, The Council of Canadians donated a portable toilet to the camp, which had previously been using a makeshift toilet inside a tent. However, it was removed by the city on November 7.

Due to these two events, and the verbal warnings being received by the City of Regina to leave, a rally was held at city hall on November 9. About 60 people gathered at noon hour and a short time later went inside and requested to meet with the mayor. The request was denied, so they occupied the front lobby of city hall until the building closed and left peacefully.

On the morning of November 10, each tent was served a formal eviction notice by the city of Regina. They were ordered to vacate the premises and remove their tents by 8:00 am, November 12, 2011. On Remembrance Day, November 11, the Occupy Regina protesters presented a wreath to the veterans to lay on the Victoria Park cenotaph. They also took down all of their signs as a show of respect and refused any media interviews. Some protesters remained in the park, and police issued nine summonses on November 14 and 15. On November 14, one man was arrested for public intoxication and breaching a previous court order.

On the morning of November 16, police removed all the tents and contents, including an Apple iPod, which police said protesters could claim at a later date. The police did not encounter any resistance as the camp was already abandoned. Those served tickets appeared in court on December 14. Lawyer Noah Evanchuk represented the group through all of their hearings, occupiers were facing a maximum fine of $2000; the tickets were dismissed in March 2012. Occupy Regina continued its work despite the loss of the camp, resorting to a variety of methods to keep their message in public view, as well joining in other protests to show solidarity with other groups, including Amnesty International, the Free Syria movement, low-income housing advocates and farm groups opposing government interference with the Canadian Wheat Board. On 20 November, Occupy Regina protesters marched into the Cornwall Centre mall and did a flash mob with playing cards. They used the human microphone method to read out a short statement. Occupy Regina has also engaged in banner hanging campaigns, utilizing underpasses throughout the city.

An attempt was made to organize a Saskatchewan component of the global 'Occupy Monsanto' event but poor weather and miscommunication resulted in media outlets going to the Monsanto Research Center when there was no event, badly damaging relations with media. On April 23, 2012, Occupy Regina had asked the public to protest "STOP HARPER" by modifying "stop" signs in their neighbourhoods.

=== Occupy Windsor ===
Occupy Windsor was an Occupy movement encampment in Windsor, Ontario, Canada. There were 25 residents as of November 11, 2011. The residents included a panhandler, who served as a security person, and a former city council member. Meetings were held twice a day. Occupy hand signals were used so that no one's voice was drowned out. Drinking, drugs and profanity in front of children were not permitted.

=== Occupy participation in other Canadian cities ===
Estimates of the number of Occupy movement participants in other Canadian cities on the Global Day of Action included:

- Winnipeg: over 400 people downtown, and dozens of people camped in Memorial Park.
- Saskatoon: 200 people took part in a rally at Friendship Park, and dozens camped. The protest later relocated to Gabriel Dumont Park until the city evicted the protesters on November 14, 2011.
- Charlottetown: 125 people outside Province House, the P.E.I. legislature.
- London: On October 22, 2011, 100 people entered Victoria Park and set up camp nearby St. Paul's Cathedral Church. The camp grew from approximately 30 tents to 150 tents and 300 full and part-time people. General Assemblys were held twice daily at noon and six P.M. In early morning November 9, 2011, circa 1:30 A.M. municipal police entered Victoria Park in large number and dismantled tents. Approximately 100 police took part in the eviction. Several ambulances were on stand by and garbage trucks were on-site. Some tents and other possessions were disposed of in the garbage trucks. No arrests were made in the initial event. Occupy London Ontario, continues to meet daily, in various committees and G.A.s are held once a week. Occupy has supported the EMD workers in their struggle with Caterpillar. Occupy London Ontario has also joined with other community activists, such as The Indignants, We are Change, Council Of Canadians, and Common Front against Austerity. Street Actions, rallies, and other activities are held regularly.
- St. John's: Some 50 people protested in wet weather near the waterfront, this was the last occupy protest camp remaining in Canada. The decamping of this site marked the end of the Occupy Movement in Canada.
- Moncton: over 300 people showed up at city hall on the Saturday October 15 global rally. Still there are about 30 occupiers living in tents at the Aberdeen Cultural Centre. Every Saturday a general assembly takes place at city hall where different groups join to help advance the cause and to show solidarity to Occupy Wall-Street.
- Guelph: Protests began October 15 with reports of up to 100 people participating on the first day in St. George Square downtown. Protesters would split up into smaller groups to share ideas and to have a chance to not only talk global issues but focus on local issues, before reconvening to share and see if common ground could be met. Protests continued downtown for three weeks before a camp was set up briefly in Royal City Park before decamping, most likely due to weather.

== Calls for specific Canadian measures ==
Duff Conacher of Democracy Watch, a non-profit citizen advocacy organization based in Ottawa, suggested the Occupy Canada movement should push for 15 key measures endorsed by 140 Canadian citizen groups over the past decade, including:

- The creation of civilian watchdog agencies to oversee corporate activity in each economic sector
- Increased financial and legal penalties for corporate illegality
- Expanded protection for whistleblower employees
- A requirement that corporations must legally represent not only the interests of shareholders, but also those of their employees, customers, society, and the environment

An earlier Canadian group modeled after Spain's Take the Square has a three-point platform:

- Transparency
- Democracy
- The Universal Declaration of Human Rights

== See also ==
Occupy articles

- List of Occupy movement protest locations
- "Occupy" protests
- Timeline of Occupy Wall Street
- We are the 99%

Other Protests

- 15 October 2011 global protests
- 2011 United States public employee protests
- 2011 Wisconsin protests

Related articles

- Idle No More, a Canadian Aboriginal protest movement
- Arab Spring
- Corporatocracy
- Corruption Perceptions Index § Rankings
- Economic inequality
- Federal political financing in Canada
- Voter turnout in Canada
