= Ken Streatch =

Canadian politician (born 1942)

The Honourable Ken Streatch ECNS

Member of the Nova Scotia House of Assembly for Colchester-Musquodoboit Valley Bedford-Musquodoboit Valley (1978-1993)
- In office September 19, 1978 – September 14, 1993
- Preceded by: Riding Established
- Succeeded by: Brooke Taylor

Personal details
- Born: January 27, 1942 (age 84) Halifax, Nova Scotia
- Party: Progressive Conservative
- Spouse: Barbara Blackburn
- Children: Judy Streatch; Steve Streatch

Kenneth Streatch (born January 27, 1942) is a farmer and former political figure in Nova Scotia, Canada. He represented Bedford-Musquodoboit Valley and then Colchester-Musquodoboit Valley in the Nova Scotia House of Assembly from 1978 to 1993 as a Progressive Conservative member.

Born in Halifax, Nova Scotia in 1942, Streatch was educated at the Nova Scotia Agricultural College. He married Barbara Blackburn in 1962. Streatch was president of the Nova Scotia Federation of Agriculture in 1972. He then served five years on Halifax County Council before entering provincial politics. His daughter Judy was also a member of the Nova Scotia assembly and is a former provincial cabinet minister.

== Political career ==
Streatch entered provincial politics in the 1978 election, when he was elected MLA for the new Bedford - Musquodoboit Valley riding. On October 5, 1978, he was appointed by premier John Buchanan to the Executive Council of Nova Scotia as Minister of Labour and Manpower and Minister of Public Works. The Ministry of Public Works was renamed and transferred to Jerry Lawrence in June 1979. Streatch remained Minister of Labour until after his re-election in the 1981 election. In December 1981, Buchanan shuffled his cabinet, moving Streatch to Minister of Fisheries. In November 1983, Streatch was shuffled to Minister of Lands and Forrests.

Streatch was re-elected in the 1984 election. On November 24, 1987, Streatch was named Minister of Mines and Energy. Streatch was re-elected in the 1988 election, defeating Liberal Geoff Regan by almost 2,000 votes. He was moved to Minister of Small Business Development in December 1988. He served as Minister of Transportation, and then Minister of Economic Development after Donald Cameron took over as premier in February 1991.

In the 1993 election, Streatch was re-elected by 758 votes in the new riding of Colchester-Musquodoboit Valley. He announced on July 20 that he was seeking the federal Progressive Conservative nomination in Central Nova for the 1993 federal election, and was nominated as the candidate on July 28. In the federal election, Streatch was defeated by Liberal Roseanne Skoke. Streatch ran again in the 1997 federal election, and lost by 41 votes to New Democrat Peter Stoffer in the Sackville—Musquodoboit Valley—Eastern Shore riding.
