= Kelly Regan =

Canadian politician

The Honourable Kelly Regan ECNS

Deputy Premier of Nova Scotia
- In office February 23, 2021 – August 31, 2021
- Premier: Iain Rankin
- Preceded by: Karen Casey
- Succeeded by: Allan MacMaster

Member of the Nova Scotia House of Assembly for Bedford Basin Bedford (2009-2021)
- In office 9 June 2009 – 27 October 2024
- Preceded by: Len Goucher
- Succeeded by: Tim Outhit

Minister of Community Services
- In office 15 June 2017 – 31 August 2021
- Premier: Stephen McNeil; Iain Rankin
- Preceded by: Joanne Bernard
- Succeeded by: Karla MacFarlane

Minister of Labour and Advanced Education
- In office 22 October 2013 – 15 June 2017
- Premier: Stephen McNeil
- Preceded by: Marilyn More
- Succeeded by: Labi Kousoulis

Minister responsible for the Advisory Council on the Status of Women Act
- In office 22 October 2013 – 31 August 2021
- Premier: Stephen McNeil
- Preceded by: Marilyn More
- Succeeded by: Karla MacFarlane

Chief Opposition Whip
- In office 12 January 2012 – 22 October 2013

Liberal Caucus Chair
- In office 17 March 2010 – 12 January 2012

Personal details
- Born: Kelly Maureen Smith; February 4, 1961 (age 65) Chatham, Ontario, Canada
- Party: Nova Scotia Liberal
- Spouse: Geoff Regan (m. 1993)
- Children: 3
- Education: University of Waterloo
- Profession: Journalist
- Website: www.kellyregan.ca

Kelly Maureen Regan (née Smith; born 4 February 1961) is a Canadian politician who served in the Nova Scotia House of Assembly from 2009 to 2024, most recently as the MLA for Bedford Basin. She was first elected as the Member for Bedford-Birch Cove. She is a member of the Nova Scotia Liberal Party.

== Early life and education ==
A native of Kitchener, Ontario, Regan graduated with a Bachelor of Arts from the University of Waterloo in 1984.

== Career ==
=== Journalism and community involvement ===
Regan moved to Nova Scotia in 1984 where she began working at CFDR-AM as a reporter covering municipal politics. Her journalism career continued as news director at ATV / ASN for seven years where she won two awards for health documentaries. This was followed by various media and public relations projects.

Regan has been active in many community organizations, serving as a library volunteer at Sunnyside Schools, a member of the organizing committee of the annual Bedford volunteer awards, as executive member of Ridgevale Homeowners’ Association, and as an elder of Bedford United Church. She also serves as a judge for the Atlantic Journalism Awards. She is also a founding member of the Nova Scotia chapter of Equal Voice, a multi-partisan group dedicated to increasing the number of women elected in Canada.

=== Politics ===
In 2009, Regan successfully ran for the Nova Scotia Liberal Party nomination in the riding of Bedford-Birch Cove. She was elected in the 2009 provincial election, defeating Progressive Conservative cabinet minister Len Goucher. The riding was renamed Bedford in 2012 and she was re-elected in this riding in the 2013 provincial election.

On October 22, 2013, following the Liberal victory in the 2013 Nova Scotia general election Regan was appointed to the Executive Council of Nova Scotia to serve as Minister of Labour and Advanced Education and Minister responsible for the Advisory Council on the Status of Women Act. On July 24, 2015, Regan was given an additional role in cabinet as minister responsible for youth.

On June 15, 2017, following the Liberal re-election in the 2017 Nova Scotia general election Premier Stephen McNeil shuffled his cabinet, moving Regan to Minister of Community Services, while keeping her as Minister responsible for the Advisory Council on the Status of Women Act. Regan was Deputy Premier of Nova Scotia in the Rankin government from February 23, 2021 until August 31, 2021. Regan was re-elected in the 2021 election, however the Rankin Liberals lost government becoming the Official Opposition. In August 2022, Liberal Leader Zach Churchill appointed her Deputy Leader of the Official Opposition, Chair of the Legislature’s Public Accounts, and shadow minister for Skills and Labour. She is a member of the Legislature Internal Affairs Committee. As of September 22, 2024, Regan serves as Deputy Leader of the Official Opposition and critic for Health and Wellness.

=== Electoral record ===
2021 Nova Scotia general election: Bedford Basin
Party	Candidate	Votes	%	±%	Expenditures
Liberal	Kelly Regan	3,700	50.87	–1.88	$54,231.55
Progressive Conservative	Nick Driscoll	1,874	25.76	–5.10	$22,733.12
New Democratic	Jacob Wilson	1,554	21.36	+9.59	$28,624.28
Green	Madeleine Taylor	146	2.01	–2.61	$685.50
Total valid votes/expense limit		7,274	99.68	–	$77,511.59
Total rejected ballots		23	0.32		
Turnout		7,297	55.51		
Eligible voters		13,146			
Liberal notional hold		Swing		+1.61	
Source: Elections Nova Scotia

2017 Nova Scotia general election
Party	Candidate	Votes	%	±%
Liberal	Kelly Regan	5,831	52.69	
Progressive Conservative	Valerie White	3,388	30.61	
New Democratic Party	Mike Poworozynk	1,362	12.30	
Green	Michealle Hanshaw	485	4.38	–

2013 Nova Scotia general election
Party	Candidate	Votes	%	±%
Liberal	Kelly Regan	6,081	60.66	
Progressive Conservative	Joan Christie	2,026	20.21	
New Democratic Party	Mike Poworozynk	1,701	16.97	
Green	Ian Charles	217	2.16	–

2009 Nova Scotia general election
Party	Candidate	Votes	%	±%
Liberal	Kelly Regan	4,861	44.48	
New Democratic Party	Brian Mosher	3,552	32.50	
Progressive Conservative	Len Goucher	2,268	20.75	
Green	Neil Green	248	2.27	–

== Personal life ==
Regan married her husband Geoff, who was the Member of Parliament for Halifax West, in December 1993, and has three children, Caitlin, Nicole, and Harrison. She resides in Bedford.

She is the granddaughter in law of John Harrison, daughter in law of Gerald Regan and sister in law of the longest host of CTV News at 5 (previously Live at 5) Nancy Regan and actress Laura Regan, of FOX's Minority Report.
