= McPherson Playhouse =

Performing arts building in Victoria, British Columbia, Canada

- the Mac
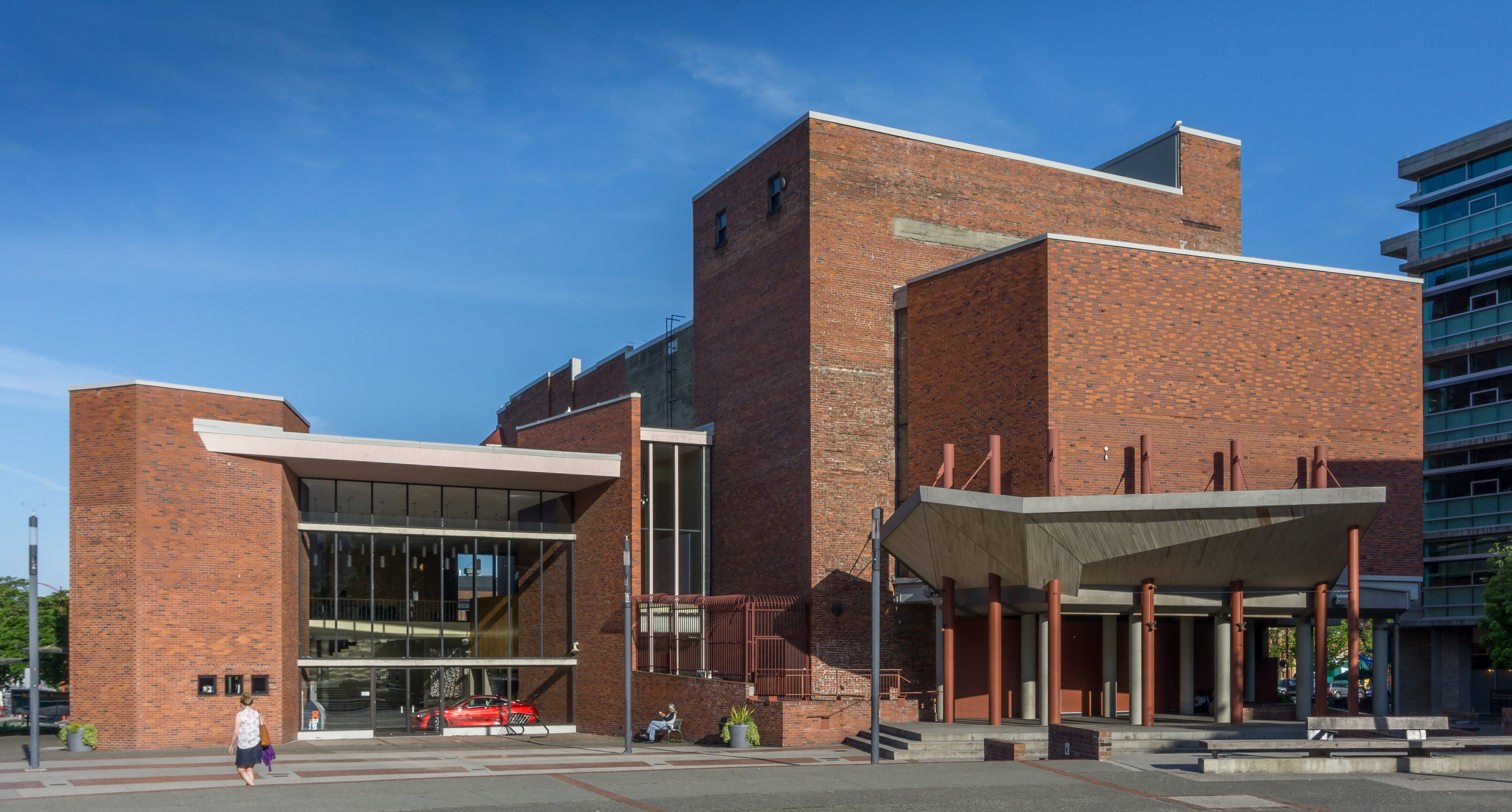
- Interactive map of McPherson Playhouse
- Address: 3 Centennial Square; Victoria, British Columbia; V8W 1P5
- Coordinates: 48°25′43″N 123°22′00″W
- Owner: The Royal and McPherson Theatre Society
- Capacity: 772
- Type: Theatre and concert hall

Construction
- Opened: 1914

Website
- www.rmts.bc.ca

The McPherson Playhouse, known as the Mac, is a theatre and concert hall in Victoria, British Columbia, Canada. Part of the Centennial Square complex on the north side of downtown Victoria, adjacent to the intersection of Pandora and Government streets across from the CTV Vancouver Island studios and the Victoria City Hall, it was originally built as a Pantages Theatre in 1914. In the 1960s it was donated, with supporting funding for its renovation, to the people of Victoria by Thomas Shanks McPherson. It became part of the Centennial Square redevelopment, finished in 1965. Renovations preserved and refurbished the Neo-Baroque auditorium but added a modern lobby and various technical improvements.

The theatre hosts professional, community and amateur events year-round and is operated as a licensee/rental venue, under the administration of the Royal and McPherson Theatres Society, which also manages the Royal Theatre. The theatre has one large balcony and two sets of boxes, and has a total capacity of 772.
