= Atlantic Chamber of Commerce =

Regional chamber of commerce in the Atlantic Canada

- Chambre de commerce de l'Atlantique
- Abbreviation: ACC
- Formation: 1896
- Type: Regional business association
- Headquarters: Windsor, Nova Scotia
- Region served: Atlantic Canada
- President and CEO: Rhonda Tulk-Lane
- Website: www.atlanticchamber.ca

The Atlantic Chamber of Commerce (ACC) is a regional chamber of commerce in alliance of local chambers of commerce and boards of trade throughout Atlantic Canada. Formed in 1896 as the Maritime Board of Trade (MBT) it was created by 10 local boards of trade in the three Maritime Provinces of Canada. In 1975 the Newfoundland Board of Trade (now St. John's Board of Trade) joined with the MBT and the organization changed its name to APCC. In 2013, reorganized as the Atlantic Chambers of Commerce, under the Canadian Not-for-profit Corporations Act.

In 2026, the ACC called the imposition of U.S. tariffs really disappointing.

== See also ==
- Economy of Canada
