= Peter J. Kelly =

Canadian politician

Peter Kelly

2nd Mayor of the Halifax Regional Municipality
- In office October 20, 2000 – November 6, 2012
- Preceded by: Walter Fitzgerald
- Succeeded by: Mike Savage

4th Mayor of Bedford
- In office 1991–1996
- Preceded by: Peter G. Christie
- Succeeded by: Amalgamated

Personal details
- Born: 1956 or 1957 (age 69–70)
- Spouse: Nancy Kelly (separated)
- Children: 3
- Education: Nova Scotia Community College; Saint Mary's University
- Profession: Municipal civil servant, business man

Peter J. Kelly (born 1956 or 1957) is a municipal civil servant, businessman and former politician. Kelly is the former Chief Administrative Officer (CAO) for Charlottetown, Prince Edward Island, Canada, who was fired in May 2022. He is a former mayor of the Halifax Regional Municipality (HRM), Nova Scotia. Kelly was elected to Bedford town council in 1985, then became mayor in 1991. In 1995, in the newly amalgamated HRM, he was elected councillor for Bedford, Nova Scotia. In 2000, he was elected Mayor of the HRM. Under scrutiny for his role in the HRM concert scandal and as executor for the will of Mary Thibeault, Kelly left politics in 2012 citing 'personal reasons'.

== Background ==
Kelly holds a Diploma in Hospitality Management from the Nova Scotia Community College and a Master of Business Administration (MBA) from Saint Mary's University. He has held administrative and managerial positions in private industry and government since 1980.

== Career ==
=== Councillor and Mayor of Bedford ===
Kelly began his political career in the former town of Bedford as a municipal councillor elected in 1985. He was elected Mayor of Bedford in 1991.

=== Mayor of Halifax Regional Municipality ===
Kelly was the second mayor of HRM, defeating the incumbent, Walter Fitzgerald, in 2000. He was re-elected in 2004 and 2008. Kelly was the longest-serving mayor of Halifax Regional Municipality, being elected in 2000 then re-elected in 2004 and 2008.

During Kelly's time as mayor, the region installed a large and long-delayed sewage treatment system known as Halifax Harbour Solutions which came into operation in 2008, broke down and was restored in 2010. Kelly was criticized for the failure of the city's Harbour Solutions sewage treatment plant which had faced delays and breakdowns.

During this time the municipality attracted several large profile national events such as the 2011 Canada Winter Games and some international events such as Tall Ships visits. A popular outcome of the Canada Winter Games was the conversion of the temporary speed skating oval into a permanent facility for speed skating and outdoor public skating. In 2007, Kelly withdrew Halifax's bid for the 2014 Commonwealth Games over concerns about the rapidly escalating costs of the games.

He was instrumental in allowing a controversial $400,000 loan of public money for a Black Eyed Peas concert in 2010 which was not approved by HRM council or reviewed by the city's legal department. The loan was not repaid when the promoter went out of business. In what became known in Halifax as the "commons concert scandal", the region's Auditor General found serious problems with the decision-making process and book-keeping for the concert loan to Power Promotional Events. The city was eventually able to recover much of the loan but is still owed approximately $359,550 from the deal.

During Kelly's tenure the municipality adopted a new regional development plan in 2006 and an urban development plan for Downtown Halifax known as "Halifax By Design" in 2009. In November 2011, the city approved and began a long-delayed construction of a new central public library. Peter Kelly pushed for an expansion of a community centre in the nation's largest African Canadian community of North Preston. Along with the community centre in North Preston, Kelly's administration saw the construction of seven fire halls, five recreational complexes, the World Trade and Convention Centre. Also, he saw the construction of the Halifax Central Library.

Kelly apologized on behalf of the municipality for the razing of Africville, backing it up was a $5 million reparation plan for the black community, of which $3 million was paid by the city. In 2011 a commemorative church and interpretive centre was constructed as part of, what is now called the Africville Apology. Late in Kelly's final term in office the municipality began the process of removal of the Cogswell Interchange.

Kelly's role in the eviction of the NS Occupy Protests on Remembrance Day 2011 caused controversy. Occupy protesters agreed to temporarily move out of Halifax's Grand Parade for the Remembrance Day ceremony and shifted their camp to Victoria Park. Kelly stated that he supported and respected the cooperation of protesters, offering an alternative location for the protest camp, but also supported the eviction and arrest of 14 protesters just minutes after the close of the Remembrance Day ceremonies. The eviction was approved by HRM council in a closed-door meeting chaired by Kelly on November 8. The decision to evict the protesters on a holiday weekend cost Halifax taxpayers an extra $106,000 in overtime costs. In response to charges that the city betrayed the trust of an agreement between the city, veterans and Occupy NS, Kelly stated that the decision was up to council and the eviction was an operational police matter.

=== Executor of the will of Mary Thibeault ===
Kelly is also criticized for his performance as the executor of the will of 91-year-old Mary Thibeault. Kelly was appointed as executor by Nova Scotia's probate court as requested in Thibeault's will. He was one of 18 heirs to the estate of about half a million dollars. The heirs which included several elderly people and charities waited eight years for the estate to be resolved, a process that usually takes 18 months. In June 2012 five of 18 beneficiaries had petitioned the province's probate court to have Kelly removed as executor alleging he had taken nearly $150,000 from the estate and that the will was still not settled seven years after Thibeault's death. In September 2012 the issue was resolved when Kelly agreed to step down after probate judge ordered him removed as Thibeault's executor. While the matter was settled, Kelly later admitted the "timeliness" of the matter became an issue.

=== Leaving politics ===
On February 22, 2012, Kelly announced he would not be running in the fall 2012 mayoral race, citing personal reasons and stating "It's an acknowledgment that I screwed up personally."

=== Return to private life ===
Upon leaving public life Kelly began a consulting business, assisting developers with the municipal development process "blending his insider’s knowledge of politics with his" business experience and education. In July 2014 Kelly went to work with former mayor's office staffer Stephen Taylor as a partner in Target Pest control, working in business development.

=== CAO of Westlock County ===
Westlock County, Alberta announced September 2, 2014 that after a Canada wide search it had hired Kelly as the county's new Chief Administrative Officer (CAO). The Mayor of Westlock County stated that while he and county council had been aware of previous controversies from Kelly's tenure as Mayor of Halifax, they still felt Kelly was "the right choice." For his part, Kelly was unconcerned that the perception of financial impropriety might interfere in his new job, saying "I have never taken any public money. I'm very honest. I'm very careful of my reputation and I try to make sure I protect it all costs. When it comes to public funds in this particular municipality, I will do whatever I can to make sure we maximize the dollars." Kelly served in this position until March 2016, leaving to become CAO of Charlottetown, PEI.

On July 7, 2016, Westlock County chief financial officer Sue Oberg told council that Kelly had approved $390,570 in un-budgeted expenses while CAO. The money was spent to develop a site in the North Horizon industrial park. Alberta's Municipal Government Act allows council to determine how much spending a CAO is allowed to approve without council approval, which in Westlock County was $10,000. In his defence Kelly stated that he relied on the information provided by public works department staff to make his decisions, and the work on the lot was outlined in a lease agreement passed by council.

On August 10, 2016 it was reported that the Westlock County Council had voted to ask the Alberta Department of Municipal Affairs to conduct a Municipal Inspection regarding issues around Kelly's role the Horizon North project among others.

When completed in July 2017 the report concluded Kelly breached the Alberta Municipal Government Act on a number of occasions. He was found to have allegedly shredded documents and worked simultaneously for the county and the City of Charlottetown, and bypassed county managers and directed a clerk to create and cancel invoices. In particular it stated "In apparent enthusiasm for economic development, Kelly acted without proper authority and failed to advise council of their legislative responsibilities."

The report also found that the county under Kelly attempted to use blueprints for constructing Fawcett Fire Hall without respect for copyright. The inspectors stated that it appeared the Baptiste Lake Fire Hall drawing were being used as a cost saving measure to avoid hiring an engineer or architect.

Kelly responded that the report was "lacking, disappointing and incomplete at best. Often appearing as inaccurate and biased." Kelly reiterated his position that he was acting on council direction contained in two motions regarding the lease, including one that approved the lease containing a clause in the lease agreement that outlined work to be done by the municipality. Kelly stated that documents were destroyed after he departed Westlock and as a result the investigators relied on interviews and allegations rather than facts.

=== CAO of Charlottetown ===
Kelly became CAO in Charlottetown on May 1, 2016. Speaking of the controversies surrounding Kelly's term as mayor, Clifford Lee, Mayor of Charlottetown, defended the choice, saying "I think he did a fantastic job for the citizens of Halifax."

Initially, Kelly was hired with a six-month probationary period, which was extended an additional six months when news of the Westlock investigation surfaced. Employment would be reviewed if he was convicted of violating any law. While retaining Kelly was defended by the Mayor and Councillor MacLeod, then chairing the city's human resource committee, Councillor Jason Coady expressed concern about the decision to retain Kelly, while Councillor Bob Doiron called the hiring "unnecessarily risky."

In October 2017 it was reported that Kelly was at the centre of increased labour unrest with city hall workers, who were exploring joining a larger union to better represent themselves. The number of grievances had increased dramatically and several city staffers pointed the finger at Kelly.

In December 2017 after an investigation by external HR consultants Kelly was found to have breached the Charlottetown's harassment policy. Kelly was found to have breached the policy seven times in relation to complaints brought by City of Charlottetown public works superintendent, including directing an improper investigation into the complainants work, harassment and bullying, and a breach in confidentiality. While City Hall issued a statement that it remained confident in his decisions, Kelly will have to undergo workplace sensitivity training.

On January 23, 2019, it was announced that Deputy CAO Scott Messervey no longer worked with the City of Charlottetown, and at the time no reason for the departure was given.

On April 14, 2022, it was announced Kelly had fired Charlottetown's Deputy CAO, Tina Lococo. CBC News reported that "privately, several councillors expressed some level of shock or concern to CBC News at the fact Kelly has parted ways with another deputy who seemed well-qualified for the position, three years after the previous deputy CAO, Scott Messervey, was fired.". On April 24, 2022 CBC reported that in 2019 Messervey reportedly told City Council that Charlottetown "was either breaking its own financial rules or not complying with the province's Municipal Government Act" but that Council chose to take 'no further action.'.

Charlottetown Council voted 8-3 to fire Kelly without cause at their Wednesday, May 11 meeting, 'effective immediately'.

== Personal life ==
In September 2021, Kelly and Diana Girouard bought an oceanfront property on Eagle Head Road in Queens County, Nova Scotia. Development of the site has been controversial. In 2022, Kelly was fined by the Nova Scotia Department of Environment and Climate Change for altering a watercourse without approval. In October 2022, more than two dozen area residents filed a lawsuit against Kelly and Girouard in the Nova Scotia Supreme Court, alleging that they had blocked a "well-marked and commonly recognized right of way" on their property.

== See also ==
- Mayors Gone Bad, July 2015 book by Philip Slayton
