= List of mayors of the Halifax Regional Municipality =

Mayor of Halifax
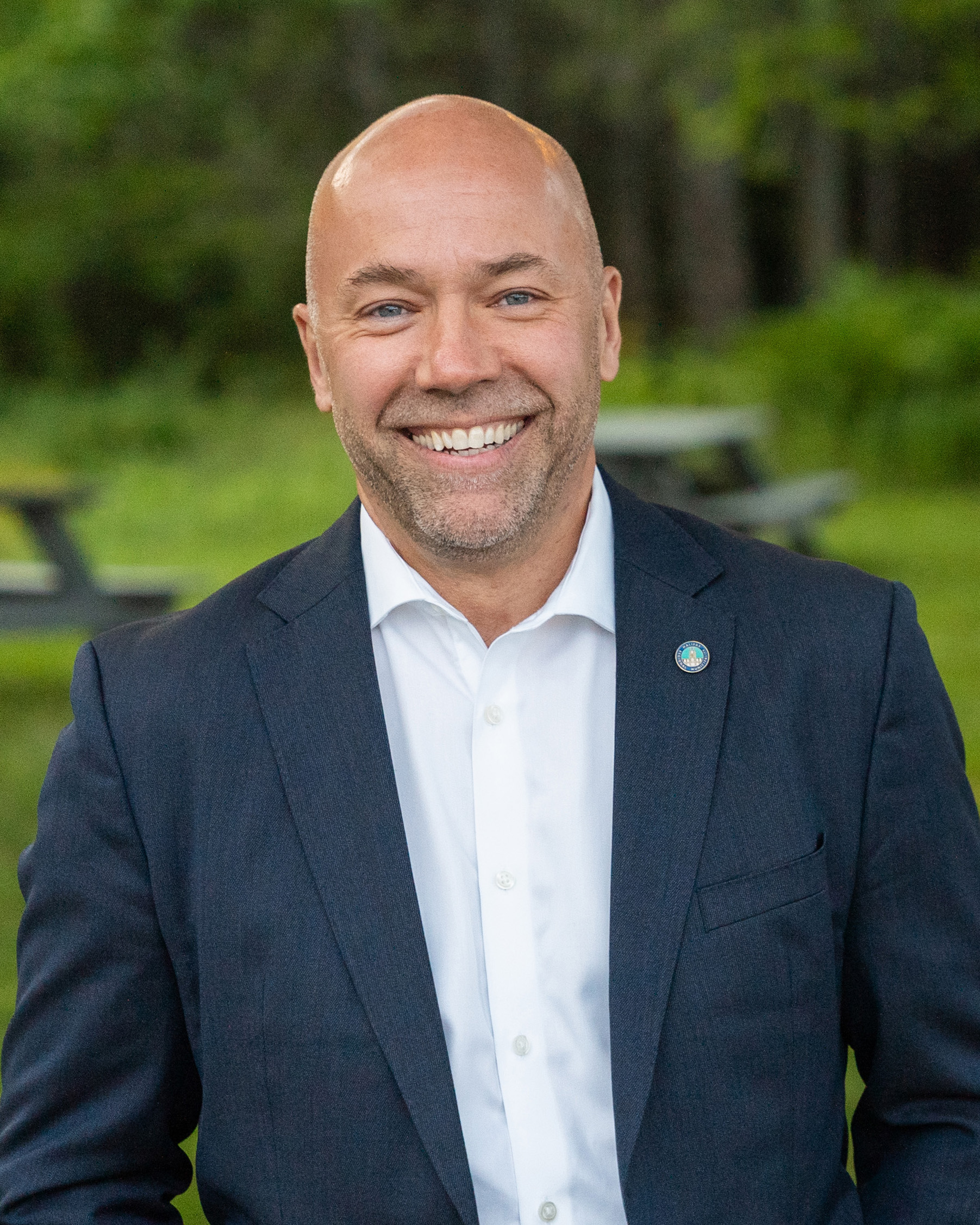
- Incumbent; Andy Fillmore since November 5, 2024
- Style: Your Worship
- Member of: Halifax Regional Council
- Reports to: Halifax Regional Council
- Seat: Halifax City Hall (Halifax, Nova Scotia, Canada)
- Appointer: Direct election by residents of Halifax
- Term length: 4 years
- Inaugural holder: Walter Fitzgerald
- Formation: April 1, 1996
- Salary: $176,034
- Website: www.halifax.ca/mayor

This is a list of mayors of the Halifax Regional Municipality. Halifax's first mayor, Walter Fitzgerald, was elected in 1996 after the municipality was created by amalgamation. The mayor of Halifax holds the highest office in the municipal government of Halifax. The mayor is elected at large during municipal elections, held every four years, and is the head of the Halifax Regional Council. The current mayor is former Halifax MP Andy Fillmore.

== List ==
#	Image	Mayor	Term start	Term end	Notes
1		Walter Fitzgerald (1936–2014)	April 1, 1996	October 20, 2000	Previously mayor of the City of Halifax
2		Peter Kelly (born 1956)	October 20, 2000	November 6, 2012	Previously mayor of the Town of Bedford
3		Mike Savage (born 1960)	November 6, 2012	November 5, 2024	Previously MP for Dartmouth-Cole Harbour
4		Andy Fillmore (born 1966)	November 5, 2024	Incumbent	Previously MP for Halifax

== See also ==
- List of mayors of Halifax, Nova Scotia for a list of mayors for the City of Halifax, from 1841–1996.
- List of mayors of Dartmouth, Nova Scotia for a list of mayors for the City of Dartmouth, from 1873–1996.
- List of mayors of Bedford, Nova Scotia for a list of mayors for the Town of Bedford, from 1979–1996.
- List of wardens of Halifax County, Nova Scotia for a list of wardens for Halifax County, from 1880 –1996.
