= Canadian Rhodes Scholars Foundation =

Canadian foundation

The Canadian Rhodes Scholars Foundation (CRSF) is an award-granting body, governed by a board of directors. It awards one to two scholarships per year to graduates of the University of Oxford in Oxford, England to pursue graduate study at any Canadian university.

Note: The Canadian Rhodes Scholar Foundation is not to be confused with the Canadian branch of the Rhodes Trust.

== History ==
Founded by Rhodes Scholars, including Roland Michener and E. Michael Howarth the Canadian Rhodes Scholars Foundation was founded in 1957, in recognition of the contribution of the Rhodes Scholarship on the lives and careers of its members. It is a distinct entity from the Canadian Association of Rhodes Scholars , with whom it shares close associations.

Although initially "the announcement of a scholarship to Canada fell somewhat short of causing an overnight sensation in Oxford" the Canadian Rhodes Scholars Foundation is supported by a number of Canadian Rhodes Scholars and former recipients. There are over 100 students who have benefited from the award since its inception.

== Scholarship ==
The Oxford-Canada Scholarship is modelled on the Rhodes Scholarship. It provides for up to two years of full tuition and associated fees, along with an annual stipend of CDN$16,000. The Scholarship also provides a CAD 1000, travel grant toward the cost of transatlantic travel and a further CAD 1,000, for travel within Canada.

Short-listed candidates are invited to interview at Rhodes House, after which selection is made. The Oxford-Canada Scholarship is awarded for a maximum of two years and is eligible only to graduates of Oxford.
