= Victoria City Hall =

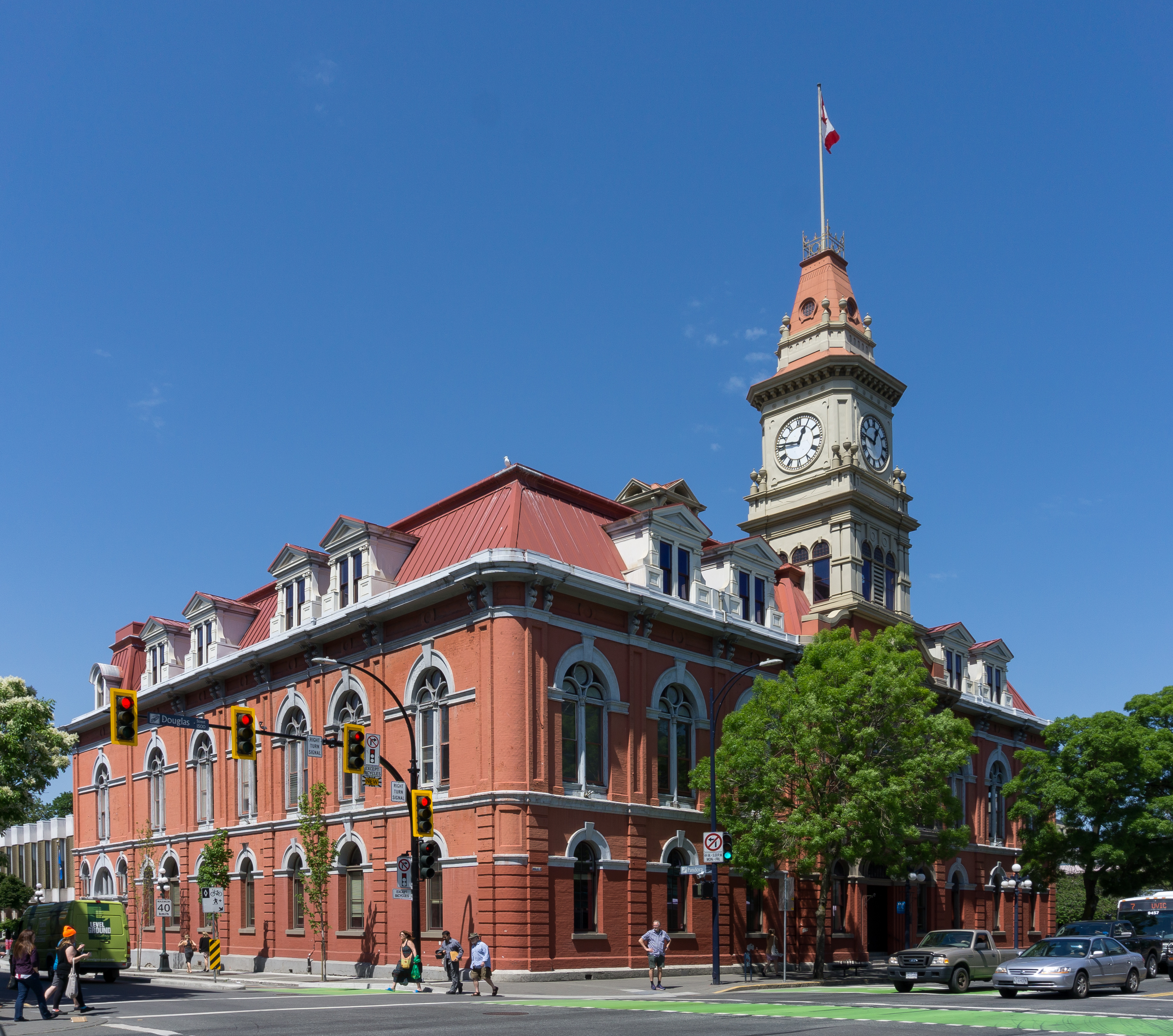
- Exterior view of Victoria City Hall

General information
- Type: Seat of local government
- Architectural style: Second Empire
- Address: 1 Centennial Square; Victoria, British Columbia; V8W 1P6
- Coordinates: 48°25′42″N 123°21′53.46″W
- Groundbreaking: 1878
- Completed: 1890
- Owner: City of Victoria

Design and construction
- Architect(s): John Teague

Website
- www.victoria.ca/EN/main/city-hall.html

National Historic Site of Canada
- Official name: Victoria City Hall National Historic Site of Canada
- Designated: 1977

Victoria City Hall is the city hall for Victoria, British Columbia, Canada. It is located at the corner of Douglas Street and Pandora Avenue adjacent to the CTV Vancouver Island studios and the McPherson Playhouse in downtown Victoria. It is home to the Victoria City Council. It was completed in 1890. It was designated a National Historic Site of Canada in 1977 and was also designated as a heritage site by the municipality in 1979.

== Construction ==
Architect John Teague designed Victoria's City Hall, which is considered "one of the best surviving examples of Second Empire-style public architecture in Western Canada." The earliest surviving municipal hall has a foot 105 tall Gillet and Johnson clock tower, three types of façades, tall windows, pedimented dormer windows and a metal mansard roof. The exterior is constructed of concrete, brick and stone. The Second Empire style reflects a change in the design and construction of governmental buildings, intended to symbolize the government's growth and power. It was constructed from 1878 to 1891 at Pandora Avenue and Douglas Street.

== Centennial Square ==
City Hall is a landmark in Victoria's Old Town District that in 1963 was nearly razed to make way for the Centennial Square, but is now an important historical building there.

== See also ==
- List of historic places in Victoria, British Columbia
