= Len Goucher =

Canadian politician

The Honourable Leonard Goucher ECNS

Member of the Nova Scotia House of Assembly for Bedford
- In office June 13, 2006 – June 9, 2009
- Preceded by: Peter Christie
- Succeeded by: Kelly Regan

Personal details
- Born: September 19, 1947 (age 78)
- Party: Progressive Conservative

Leonard Goucher (born September 19, 1947) is a Canadian politician who represented the electoral district of Bedford in the Nova Scotia House of Assembly from 2006 to 2009. He is a member of the Progressive Conservatives.

A town councilor in Bedford, Nova Scotia from 1988 to 1996, Goucher was elected to Halifax Regional Council in 2000. He was re-elected in 2004 and served as Deputy Mayor of the Halifax Regional Municipality. He entered provincial politics in the 2006 election, defeating Liberal leader Francis MacKenzie in the Bedford riding. In June 2006, Goucher was appointed to the Executive Council of Nova Scotia as Minister of Tourism, Culture and Heritage. In October 2007, Goucher was shuffled to Minister of Immigration. In January 2009, he was given two additional roles in cabinet, becoming Minister of the Public Service Commission, and Minister of Seniors. In the 2009 election, Goucher was defeated by Liberal Kelly Regan.

In February 2010, he became embroiled in a spending scandal involving inappropriate expenses charged to the public by a number of Nova Scotia MLAs. Goucher was singled out by the Canadian Taxpayers Federation when they highlighted Nova Scotian politicians for their "outrageous" expense claims, naming him the all-star of the scandal and giving him the nickname Len "the master of multi-tasking" Goucher. On February 14, 2011 the RCMP released its investigation results and he was cleared of any wrongdoing.
