= Dave Wilson (Sackville politician) =

Canadian politician

The Honourable David Allan Wilson ECNS

Member of the Nova Scotia House of Assembly for Sackville-Cobequid
- In office August 5, 2003 – November 16, 2018
- Preceded by: John Holm
- Succeeded by: Steve Craig

Personal details
- Born: 1970 Alma, Quebec
- Party: New Democratic Party
- Occupation: Paramedic

David "Dave" Allan Wilson (born 1970) is a Canadian politician and member of the Nova Scotia House of Assembly, representing the riding of Sackville-Cobequid for the Nova Scotia New Democratic Party. He was first elected in the 2003 election when veteran MLA John Holm did not re-offer. Wilson was re-elected in the 2006, 2009, 2013 and 2017 elections.

Wilson stepped down as the MLA for Sackville-Cobequid on November 16, 2018, stating, "It's just time for me to look at other things".

== Early life ==
Prior to his election, Wilson was a paramedic in the community of Sackville for almost eight years. He was educated at Sackville High School and Saint Mary's University. He also received his Diploma as an Emergency Medical Technician at the School of Allied Health - School of Emergency Health Services at the VG Hospital, Halifax.

He volunteered as a firefighter with HRM Fire and Emergency Services and the Sackville Fire Department, where he has held several key executive positions including vice-chairman of the department.

== Member of the Legislative Assembly ==
=== Role in Opposition ===
From 2005 to 2008, while in opposition, Wilson performed the critic roles for Heritage and Culture, Tourism, Heritage Act, and Housing and Communications until August 2005, when he was named the critic for Health.

=== Introduction of Bills ===
Wilson introduced several bills while in opposition, including amendments to the Motor Vehicle Act which would require drivers on highways without a median barrier to slow to 50 km/h when passing a motor vehicle accident where authorities are present, the Health Protection Act which would require the Minister of Health to develop a pre-surgery care program for each district health authorities, and the Volunteer Services Act which suggested that ‘good Samaritans rendering service or assistance under this Act are not responsible for the payment of fees associated with rendering that service or assistance.’ Each of these bills was blocked by the Conservative government at the time and did not escalate past the 1st reading.

=== Member of the Executive Council of Nova Scotia ===
On January 11, 2011, Wilson was appointed to the Executive Council of Nova Scotia as Minister of a newly amalgamated Department of Communities, Culture and Heritage.

As Minister, Wilson released Nova Scotia's first strategic Arts and Culture 5-Year plan.

On March 27, 2012, Wilson appointed members to the first Arts Nova Scotia board. The board is composed of eleven Nova Scotians from across the arts sector and is part of the province's five-point plan on arts and culture released in February 2011. Nine years prior, a similar group existed under the Conservative government, however it was dismantled, stating that the move would cut administrative costs and artists would receive the money directly.

On May 30, 2012, Premier Darrell Dexter shuffled his cabinet, moving Maureen MacDonald to the Finance portfolio, making way for Wilson to take over as Minister of Health and Minister of Acadian Affairs.

=== Return to Opposition ===
Wilson was re-elected in the 2013 election, but returned to opposition as the New Democrats finished third. On June 7, 2015, Wilson announced his intention to seek the leadership of the NS NDP at the party's 2016 leadership convention. On February 27, 2016, Wilson was defeated in his bid for the leadership, finishing third on the first ballot.

Wilson was re-elected in the 2017 election.

== Electoral record ==
2017 Nova Scotia general election
Party	Candidate	Votes	%	±%
New Democratic	Dave Wilson	3,465	44.0	
Liberal	Michel Hindlet	2,038	25.9	
Progressive Conservative	John Giannakos	1,991	25.3	
Green	Tanner Montgomery	262	3.3	
Atlantica	Cathy Morgan	88	1.1	
Total valid votes			100.0	

2013 Nova Scotia general election
Party	Candidate	Votes	%	±%
New Democratic Party	Dave Wilson	2,983	38.45	-26.89
Liberal	Graham Cameron	2,898	37.35	+17.60
Progressive Conservative	Peter MacIsaac	1,651	21.28	+8.82
Green	John Percy	227	2.93	+0.47

2009 Nova Scotia general election
Party	Candidate	Votes	%	±%
New Democratic Party	Dave Wilson	5120	65.34	
Liberal	Scott Hemming	1548	19.75	
Progressive Conservative	Jessica Alexander	976	12.46	
Green	Ian Charles	192	2.45	–

2006 Nova Scotia general election
Party	Candidate	Votes	%	±%
New Democratic Party	Dave Wilson	4475	54.50	
Progressive Conservative	Steve Craig	2499	30.42	
Liberal	David Major	1055	12.80	
Green	Elizabeth Nicolson	187	2.28	–

2003 Nova Scotia general election
Party	Candidate	Votes	%	±%
New Democratic Party	Dave Wilson	3881	45.22	
Progressive Conservative	John Giannakos	2426	28.43	
Liberal	Bob Harvey	2147	25.23	
Marijuana	Michael D. Patriquen	97	1.12	
