= Brad Johns =

Canadian politician

The Honourable Brad Johns ECNS MLA

Member of the Nova Scotia House of Assembly for Sackville-Uniacke
- Incumbent
- Assumed office May 30, 2017
- Preceded by: Stephen Gough

Member of Halifax Regional Council
- In office November 6, 2012 – November 1, 2016
- Preceded by: District created
- Succeeded by: Lisa Blackburn
- Constituency: District 14 Middle/Upper Sackville – Beaver Bank - Lucasville
- In office November 7, 2000 – November 6, 2012
- Preceded by: Barry Barnet
- Succeeded by: District dissolved
- Constituency: District 19 Middle and Upper Sackville - Lucasville

Minister of Justice and Attorney General of Nova Scotia
- In office August 31, 2021 – April 19, 2024
- Premier: Tim Houston
- Preceded by: Randy Delorey

Provincial Secretary of Nova Scotia
- In office August 31, 2021 – April 19, 2024
- Premier: Tim Houston
- Preceded by: Randy Delorey

Personal details
- Born: Halifax Regional Municipality, Nova Scotia
- Party: Progressive Conservative
- Occupation: Politician

Bradley Harris Johns is a Canadian politician who was elected to the Nova Scotia House of Assembly in the 2017 provincial election. A member of the Progressive Conservative Association of Nova Scotia, he represents the electoral district of Sackville-Uniacke.

== Early life and education ==
Johns grew up in Middle Sackville and graduated from Sackville High School in 1988 and then attended Mount Saint Vincent University, graduating with a Bachelor of Arts in History.

== Before politics ==
Prior to his election to the House of Assembly, Johns was a Halifax Regional Municipal Councillor from 2000 until his defeat in 2016. During his tenure as a councillor, Johns was twice ranked as "HRM's most absent councillor", missing 19 Committee of the Whole, standing committee and community council meetings in 2015, and 25 in 2014. From 2007-2010, Johns did not receive a grade above "C" from The Coast's Councillor Report Cards, receiving a "D" grade in 2007, 2008 and 2010. He also received a "D" grade in the year 2000. When asked for an interview prior to the 2008 grades being released, Johns was quoted as saying, "Why the hell would I want to meet with The Coast?... You guys keep giving me a D and I get elected with more votes than anyone else.".

Johns was also the first elected representative to serve as a chairperson for the RCMP / HRP Board of Police Commissioners and was deputy mayor of the Halifax Regional Municipality in 2010 and 2011.

== Political career ==
In November 2017, Johns endorsed Nova Scotia PC leadership candidate Tim Houston.

On August 31, 2021, Johns was made Minister of Justice and Attorney General as well as Provincial Secretary and Minister of Labor Relations.

On April 19, 2024, Johns resigned from Cabinet, one day after stating that he did not believe domestic violence was an epidemic. Johns made the comments on the four-year anniversary of the mass shooting in Nova Scotia, which resulted in the deaths of 22 people. Johns was the second minister of the Houston government to quit cabinet, following the resignation of Trevor Boudreau.

He was re-elected in the 2024 Nova Scotia general election.

== Electoral record ==
2024 Nova Scotia general election: Sackville-Uniacke
Party	Candidate	Votes	%	±%
Progressive Conservative	Brad Johns	2,925	48.99	5.16
New Democratic	Lisa Blackburn	2,529	42.35	20.68
Liberal	Thomas Trappenberg	517	8.66	-24.14
Total		5,971	–	
Total rejected ballots		58		
Turnout		6,394	42.26	
Eligible voters		15,130		
Progressive Conservative hold		Swing		
Source: Elections Nova Scotia

2021 Nova Scotia general election: Sackville-Uniacke
Party	Candidate	Votes	%	±%	Expenditures
Progressive Conservative	Brad Johns	3,104	43.82	+0.24	$22,052.59
Liberal	Donalda MacIsaac	2,323	32.80	+0.67	$30,586.74
New Democratic	Thomas Hill	1,535	21.67	+1.81	$31,376.42
Green	Carson LeQuesne	121	1.71	-1.73	$200.00
Total valid votes/expense limit		7,083	99.72	–	$81,042.78
Total rejected ballots		20	0.28		
Turnout		7,103	51.44		
Eligible voters		13,809			
Progressive Conservative hold		Swing		-0.22	
Source: Elections Nova Scotia

2017 Nova Scotia general election: Sackville-Beaver Bank
Party	Candidate	Votes	%	±%
Progressive Conservative	Brad Johns	2,923	43.58	+20.86
Liberal	Stephen Gough	2,155	32.13	-8.08
New Democratic	Dennis Kutchera	1,332	19.86	-17.21
Green	Michael Montgomery	231	3.44	
Atlantica	Rita Billington	66	0.98	
Total valid votes		6,707	100	
Total rejected ballots		14	0.21	
Turnout		6,721	48.69	
Eligible voters		13,803		
Progressive Conservative gain from Liberal		Swing		-3.12
Source: Elections Nova Scotia
