= 2016 Nova Scotia New Democratic Party leadership election =

- February 27, 2016
- Turnout: 2,271 delegates
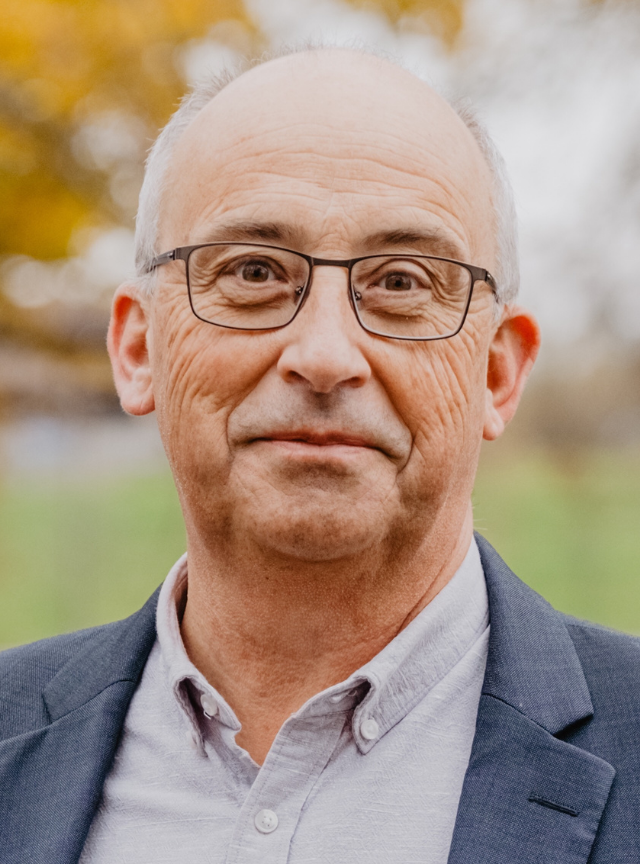
		LZ	DW
Candidate	Gary Burrill	Lenore Zann	Dave Wilson
First ballot	921; 40.59%	705; 31.07%	645; 28.34%
Second ballot	1,343; 59.19%	926; 40.81%	Eliminated
Leader before election
Maureen MacDonald (interim)
Elected Leader
Gary Burrill

2016 New Democratic Party of Nova Scotia leadership election
- Date: February 27, 2016
- Convention: Holiday Inn Harbourview, Dartmouth
- Resigning leader: Darrell Dexter
- Won by: Gary Burrill
- Ballots: 2
- Candidates: 3
- Entrance fee: C$15,000
- Spending limit: C$75,000

The election for the leadership of the Nova Scotia New Democratic Party was triggered on November 16, 2013, following Darrell Dexter's resignation after losing the seat he contested in the 2013 election. The party elected Gary Burrill as their new leader on February 27, 2016, following a one-member one-vote election held during a convention at the Holiday Inn Harbourview in Dartmouth.

== Timeline ==
=== 2013 ===
- October 8 – The 2013 general election is held, reducing the NS NDP to seven seats. Darrell Dexter, the party's leader since 2001, defeated in the seat he contested by 21 votes.
- November 16 – Darrell Dexter formally submits his resignation to the party's executive at an executive meeting in Halifax.
- November 23 – Maureen MacDonald, MLA for Halifax Needham and Finance Minister in Dexter's final cabinet, is appointed Interim Leader by the party's Provincial Council.

=== 2015 ===
- April 11 – Rules for the Leadership Election approved by the party's Provincial Council at its meeting in Hatchet Lake.
- June 7 – Dave Wilson, MLA for Sackville-Cobequid since 2003 and a former Health Minister, launches his leadership campaign at an event in Lower Sackville.
- June 11 – Gary Burrill, MLA for Colchester-Musquodoboit Valley from 2009 to 2013, launches his leadership campaign at an event in Halifax.
- June 12 – Lenore Zann, MLA for Truro-Bible Hill since 2009, launches her leadership campaign at an event in Halifax.
- June 13 – Leadership Election officially begins at the conclusion of the party's AGM in Dartmouth. Three provincial by-elections are also called by Premier Stephen McNeil for July 14 that same day.
- July 14 – Three provincial by-elections occur, with Dartmouth South NDP Candidate Marian Mancini winning by less than 100 votes.
- November 28 – First leadership forum is held in Whitney Pier.
- December 5 – Second leadership forum is held in Bible Hill.

=== 2016 ===
- February 27 – Leadership convention is held in Dartmouth

== Candidates ==
=== Gary Burrill ===
Background

Gary Burrill was MLA for Colchester-Musquodoboit Valley (2009–2013)

Date campaign launched: June 11, 2015
Campaign website: garyburrill.ca
Supporters

- MLAs:
- Former MLAs: (4) Howard Epstein (Halifax Chebucto 1998–2013); Jim Morton (Kings North 2009–13); Clarrie MacKinnon (Pictou East 2006–13); Moe Smith (Antigonish 2009–13, former cabinet minister);
- Federal politicians:
- Municipal politicians: Wendy Robinson, Mayor of Stewiacke
- Labour organizations:
- Other prominent individuals:

=== Dave Wilson ===
Background

Dave Wilson was MLA for Sackville-Cobequid (2003–2018), Minister of Health (May 2012 – October 2013), Minister of Communities, Culture and Heritage (January 2011 – May 2012)

Date campaign launched: June 7, 2015
Campaign website: www.davewilson2016.ca
Supporters

- MLAs:
- Former MLAs: (7) Pam Birdsall (Lunenburg 2009–2013); Frank Corbett (Cape Breton Centre 1998–2015, former Deputy Premier); Bill Estabrooks (Timberlea-Prospect 1998–2013, former cabinet minister); Gordie Gosse (Cape Breton Nova 2003–2015, former Speaker of the House of Assembly of Nova Scotia); Becky Kent (Cole Harbour-Eastern Passage 2007–2013); John MacDonnell (Hants East 1998–2013, former cabinet minister, 2002 leadership candidate); Charlie Parker (Pictou West 1998–1999 & 2003–2013, former cabinet minister)
- Federal politicians:
- Labour organizations:
- Other prominent individuals:

=== Lenore Zann ===
Background

Lenore Zann was MLA for Truro-Bible Hill (2009–2021).

Date campaign launched: June 12, 2015
Campaign website: www.lenore4leader.com
Supporters

- MLAs: (1) Denise Peterson-Rafuse (Chester-St. Margaret's);
- Former MLAs: (3) Peter Delefes (Halifax Citadel 1998–1999); Helen MacDonald (Cape Breton The Lakes 1997–1999, NS NDP Leader 2000–2001); Alexa McDonough (Halifax Chebucto 1981–1993, Halifax Fairview 1993–1995, NS NDP Leader 1980–1994, MP Halifax 1997–2008, Federal NDP Leader 1995–2003);
- Federal politicians: (1) Gordon Earle (Halifax West 1997–2000);
- Labour organizations:
- Other prominent individuals:

== Results ==
=== First ballot ===
- Gary Burrill: 921 – 40.59%
- Lenore Zann: 705 – 31.07%
- Dave Wilson: 645 – 28.34%

=== Second ballot ===
- Gary Burrill: 1343 – 59.19%
- Lenore Zann: 926 – 40.81%
