= Robert Batherson =

President of the Conservative Party of Canada

President of the Conservative Party of Canada
- In office March 19, 2021 – September 8, 2023
- Leader: Erin O'Toole; Candice Bergen; Pierre Poilievre
- Preceded by: Scott Lamb
- Succeeded by: Stephen Barber

President of the Progressive Conservative Party of Nova Scotia
- In office November 2009 – February 2012
- Leader: Karen Casey; Jamie Baillie
- Preceded by: Scott Armstrong
- Succeeded by: Janet Fryday Dorey

Personal details
- Born: November 3, 1975 (age 50) Sydney, Nova Scotia, Canada
- Party: Conservative
- Other political affiliations: Progressive Conservative Association of Nova Scotia
- Children: 1
- Education: Mount Saint Vincent University
- Profession: Public Affairs Executive

Robert Batherson (born November 3, 1975) is a Canadian politician and public affairs executive past president of the Conservative Party of Canada. Before becoming national president, Batherson was a two-term National Councillor from Nova Scotia.

== Personal life ==
Batherson was born in Sydney, Nova Scotia. He moved to Riverview, New Brunswick and then later to Lower Sackville, Nova Scotia. He was educated at Sackville High School. Batherson earned his bachelor's degree in Public Relations at Mount Saint Vincent University in 1997. He has worked as a marketing executive in various sectors as well as a staffer on Parliament Hill prior to his current role. Batherson is married and has one son. He is proficient in French and he is the first Conservative Party of Canada President from Atlantic Canada.

== Politics ==
Batherson began working in communications and research for the Progressive Conservative Association of Nova Scotia Caucus Office and later worked as a political staffer for Peter MacKay. In the 1998 Nova Scotia general election, Batherson ran as a Progressive Conservative party candidate in the riding of Sackville-Cobequid. Following the 1999 Nova Scotia general election he worked as Premier John Hamm's Press Secretary and later as his Communications Director.

Batherson served in the role of President of the Progressive Conservative Association of Nova Scotia between 2009 and 2012.

Batherson then ran again in 2017 Nova Scotia general election in the riding of Halifax Citadel-Sable Island.

In 2016, Batherson was first elected to the Conservative Party of Canada's National Council as a councillor from Nova Scotia. In March 2021, he was elected as the president of the Conservative Party of Canada, taking over from Scott Lamb.

Batherson announced that he will run as the Conservative Party candidate for Halifax West in the 45th Canadian Federal Election.

At the time of the 2025 Canadian federal election, he lived in Halifax, Nova Scotia.

== Professional career ==
Batherson works as a communications and public affairs advisor. He has served as the chair of the Halifax Chamber of Commerce and the Neptune Theatre Foundation. Batherson has also served as a member of the Halifax Stanfield International Airport's board of directors.

== Electoral record ==
2025 Canadian federal election: Halifax West
Party	Candidate	Votes	%	±%	Expenditures
Liberal	Lena Metlege Diab	36,200	65.60	+18.04	$60,341.76
Conservative	Rob Batherson	15,020	27.22	+5.67	$76,728.19
New Democratic	Rae Tench	3,083	5.59	-20.41	$17,705.93
Green	Ron G. Parker	497	0.90	-1.55	$3,188.51
People's	Adam LeRue	384	0.70	-1.61	$2,080.03
Total valid votes		55,184	99.23	–0.30	$125,733.18
Total rejected ballots		426	0.77	+0.30	
Turnout		55,610	73.42	+9.12	
Eligible voters (Note: Number of eligible voters does not include election day registrations.)		75,745			
Liberal notional hold		Swing		+6.19	
Source: Elections Canada

2017 Nova Scotia general election: Halifax Citadel-Sable Island
Party	Candidate	Votes	%	±%
Liberal	Labi Kousoulis	2,419	41.28	-6.38
New Democratic	Glenn Walton	1,618	27.61	-3.47
Progressive Conservative	Rob Batherson	1,480	25.26	+7.68
Green	Martin Willison	343	5.85	+2.67
Total valid votes		5,860	100	
Total rejected ballots		29	0.49	
Turnout		5,889	39.3	
Eligible voters		14,910		
Liberal hold		Swing		-1.46
Source: Elections Nova Scotia

1998 Nova Scotia general election: Sackville-Cobequid
Party	Candidate	Votes	%	±%
New Democratic	John Holm	5,909	62.71%	14.74%
Liberal	Jack Brill	2,131	22.61%	-7.43%
Progressive Conservative	Rob Batherson	1,383	14.68%	-7.32%
Total valid votes		9,423	99.71	
Total rejected ballots		27	0.29	-0.19
Turnout		9,450	67.26	-6.62
Eligible voters		14,050		
New Democratic hold		Swing		+11.08
Source(s) Source: Nova Scotia Legislature (2021). "Electoral History for Sackville-Cobequid" (PDF). nslegislature.ca.
