= Malcolm MacKay (Canadian politician) =

Canadian politician (1944–2025)

Malcolm A. MacKay

MLA for Sackville
- In office 1978–1984
- Preceded by: new riding
- Succeeded by: John Holm

Personal details
- Born: January 29, 1944 Dartmouth, Nova Scotia, Canada
- Died: January 25, 2025 (aged 80)
- Party: Progressive Conservative
- Occupation: Telephone technician

Malcolm A. MacKay (January 29, 1944 – January 25, 2025) was a Canadian politician. He represented the electoral district of Sackville in the Nova Scotia House of Assembly from 1978 to 1984. He was a member of the Nova Scotia Progressive Conservative Party.

== Life and career ==
MacKay was born in Dartmouth, Nova Scotia on January 29, 1944. Educated in Montreal at Sir George Williams University and Collège Sainte-Marie de Montréal, he was a telephone technician. In 1962, he married Claudia June Burns.

After serving two years on Halifax County Council, MacKay entered provincial politics in the 1978 election, defeating Liberal incumbent George Doucet in the new Sackville riding. He was re-elected in the 1981 election. In the 1984 election, MacKay was defeated by New Democrat John Holm, finishing third behind Liberal Bill MacDonald. Controversy arose during the campaign, when MacKay admitted he used a false address to claim expenses as a member living away from the capital. In April 1985, an Auditor General's report asked MacKay to repay over $7,000 in extra expenses. The money was paid back and MacKay was not charged criminally.

In February 2004, a political comeback bid ended when MacKay's candidacy for the Conservative nomination in Halifax West for the 2004 federal election was rejected by the party. MacKay attempted to return to provincial politics in the 2006 election, running for the Nova Scotia Liberal Party in Hants East, but finished third.

MacKay died on January 25, 2025, at the age of 80.
