= Hammonds Plains-Upper Sackville =

Former Canadian electoral district

Nova Scotia electoral district

Defunct provincial electoral district
- Legislature: Nova Scotia House of Assembly
- District created: 2003
- District abolished: 2013
- Last contested: 2009

Demographics
- Population (2011): 25,576
- Electors: 17,937
- Census division: Halifax Regional Municipality

Hammonds Plains—Upper Sackville is a former provincial electoral district in Nova Scotia, Canada, which existed from 2003 to 2013. It elected one member of the Nova Scotia House of Assembly. In its last configuration, the electoral district included those communities comprising the western suburbs of the Halifax Regional Municipality, namely Hammonds Plains, Yankeetown, Pockwock, Upper Sackville and Lucasville.

The electoral district was created in 2003, drawing parts of the electoral districts of Sackville-Beaver Bank (now defunct) and Timberlea-Prospect. The electoral district was abolished following the 2012 electoral boundary review and was largely replaced by the new electoral district of Hammonds Plains-Lucasville.

== Members of the Legislative Assembly ==
The electoral district was represented by the following members of the Legislative Assembly:

Hammonds Plains-Upper Sackville
Legislature	Years	Member	Party
District created from Sackville-Beaver Bank (1993–2003) and Timberlea-Prospect (1993–Present)
59th	2003–2006	Barry Barnet	Progressive Conservative
60th	2006–2009	Barry Barnet	Progressive Conservative
61st	2009–2013	Mat Whynott	New Democratic
District dissolved into Hammonds Plains-Lucasville (2013–Present)

== Election results ==
=== 2009 ===
2009 Nova Scotia general election
Party	Candidate	Votes	%	±%
New Democratic	Mat Whynott	4,815	50.03%	13.91%
Liberal	Patrick Doyle	2,381	24.74%	4.73%
Progressive Conservative	Barry Barnet	2,218	23.05%	-18.93%
Green	Shawn Redmond	210	2.18%	0.29%
Total		9,624	–	
Source(s) Source: Nova Scotia Legislature (2024). "Electoral History for Hammonds Plains-Upper Sackville" (PDF). nslegislature.ca.

=== 2006 ===
2006 Nova Scotia general election
Party	Candidate	Votes	%	±%
Progressive Conservative	Barry Barnet	3,704	41.97%	0.83%
New Democratic	Mat Whynott	3,188	36.12%	8.52%
Liberal	Pam Streeter	1,766	20.01%	-9.95%
Green	Scott Cleghorn	167	1.89%	–
Total		8,825	–	
Source(s) Source: Nova Scotia Legislature (2024). "Electoral History for Hammonds Plains-Upper Sackville" (PDF). nslegislature.ca.

=== 2003 ===
2003 Nova Scotia general election
Party	Candidate	Votes	%	±%
Progressive Conservative	Barry Barnet	3,322	41.14%	–
Liberal	Pam Streeter	2,419	29.96%	–
New Democratic	Brenda Haley	2,229	27.60%	–
Marijuana	Melanie Patriquen	105	1.30%	–
Total		8,075	–	
Source(s) Source: Nova Scotia Legislature (2024). "Electoral History for Hammonds Plains-Upper Sackville" (PDF). nslegislature.ca.
