= Stephen Gough (politician) =

Canadian politician

Member of the Nova Scotia House of Assembly for Sackville-Beaver Bank
- In office October 8, 2013 – May 30, 2017
- Preceded by: Mat Whynott
- Succeeded by: Brad Johns

Personal details
- Party: Liberal

Stephen Gough is a Canadian politician, who was elected to the Nova Scotia House of Assembly in the 2013 provincial election. A member of the Nova Scotia Liberal Party, he represented the electoral district of Sackville-Beaver Bank. He was defeated when he ran for re-election in 2017.

== Electoral record ==
2013 Nova Scotia general election
Party	Candidate	Votes	%	±%
Liberal	Stephen Gough	2,570	40.21	
New Democratic Party	Mat Whynott	2,369	37.07	
Progressive Conservative	Sarah Reeves	1,452	22.72	
