= Don Plett =

Canadian politician

The Honourable Don Plett
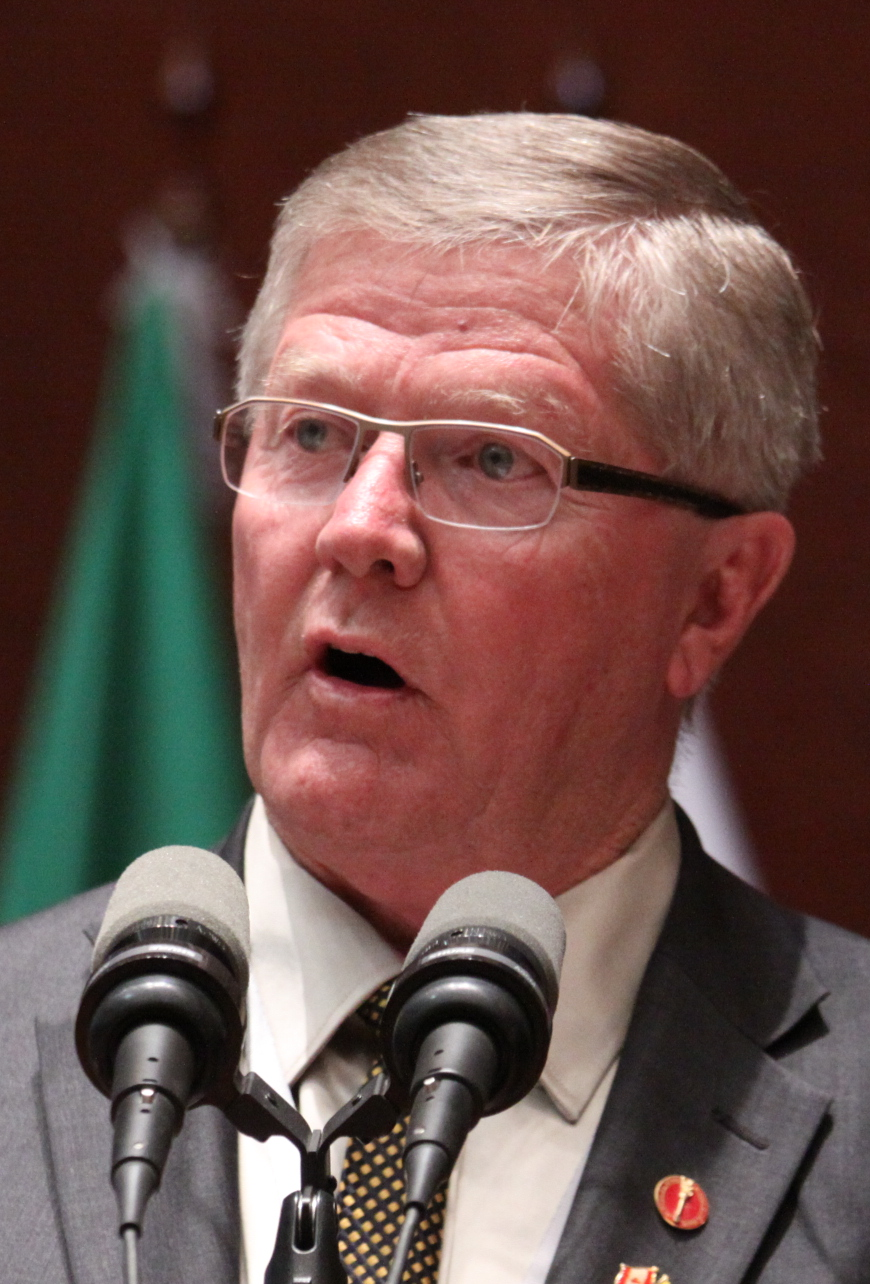
- Plett in 2015

Leader of the Opposition in the Senate
- In office November 5, 2019 – May 14, 2025
- Leader: Andrew Scheer; Erin O'Toole; Pierre Poilievre
- Preceded by: Larry Smith
- Succeeded by: Leo Housakos

Canadian Senator from Manitoba
- In office August 27, 2009 – May 14, 2025
- Nominated by: Stephen Harper
- Appointed by: Michaëlle Jean

President of the Conservative Party
- In office December 7, 2003 – December 7, 2009; Interim: 2003–2005
- Preceded by: Office established
- Succeeded by: John Walsh

Personal details
- Born: Donald Neil Plett; May 14, 1950 (age 76) Landmark, Manitoba, Canada
- Party: Conservative
- Spouse: Betty Plett (m. 1968)
- Children: 4
- Education: Red River College

Donald Neil Plett (born May 14, 1950) is a former Canadian politician. He was appointed to the Senate of Canada to represent Manitoba on August 27, 2009. He served as leader of the Opposition in the Canadian Senate from 2019 until 2025. He is the founding president of the Conservative Party of Canada.

== Early life ==
From 1987 to 2007 Plett, was owner and manager of Landmark Mechanical, a heating and ventilation company in Landmark, Manitoba, that was started by his father Archie Plett in 1957. He stepped down as manager in 2007, and his sons continue in the family business.

According to the Senate website Plett,

"As a Red River College alumnus, Mr. Plett served on the Board of Governors of the College. An active sports enthusiast, he has coached and played hockey, basketball, and golf and was President of the Landmark Minor Hockey Association. Mr. Plett also served as President of the Chamber of Commerce, Chair of the Village Council, and Chair of the local Utilities Board."

— Senate of Canada biography

His father Archie, a lifelong Conservative, introduced Plett to the world of politics when he was just fifteen. He mentored and encouraged him and in 1965 Plett worked as a youth volunteer on the Honourable Jake Epp's federal campaign.

In 2000, Plett successfully managed the Vic Toews Canadian Alliance campaign where Toews defeated incumbent Liberal MP David Iftody by a large margin.

Plett became interim president of the Conservative Party of Canada at its creation in 2003 from the merger of the Canadian Alliance and the Progressive Conservative Party of Canada and was officially elected to the position in at the party's first policy convention in 2005, defeating Montreal lawyer Brian Mitchell. He was succeeded by John Walsh in 2009.

== Senate career ==
On August 27, 2009, the office of Prime Minister Stephen Harper announced that Plett was among nine new appointees to the Senate. His is one of many appointments made in thanks to service to the governing Conservative Party. Other appointees include Carolyn Stewart-Olsen, the prime minister's former press secretary, and Doug Finley, former Conservative Party chair.

Senator Plett was appointed Opposition Whip for the Conservative Senate Caucus and serves on the Standing Senate Committee on Legal & Constitutional Affairs and Agriculture & Forestry. He is also Chair of the Advisory Working Group tasked with studying and recommending changes to the Senate's administrative rules.

Plett served as co-chair of the Canada-China Legislative Association a non-partisan forum established in 1998 for the discussion of bilateral and multilateral issues concerning Canada and the People's Republic of China. On 1 October 2014 the Canada-China Foreign Investment Promotion and Protection Agreement (FIPA) came into force. This date was announced by International Trade Minister Ed Fast in a news release on 12 September 2014.

In a rare move Plett spoke out against the motion into the Senate to suspend Mike Duffy, Pamela Wallin and Patrick Brazeau without pay before a single charge had been laid. Plett, calling on fairness and justice, argued, "Honourable Senators, just because something is within our rights, does not make it the right thing to do." National Post journalist observed that Don Plett, the owner of a plumbing business from Landmark, Manitoba, is representative of the base of the Conservative party.

In 2017, Plett defended fellow Conservative Senator Lynn Beyak following Beyak's controversial statements in support of Canadian Indian residential schools.

In 2019, Plett was elected by colleagues as the Leader of the Opposition in the Senate, succeeding Larry Smith.

In 2020, Pletts voiced support for Donald Trump and the Republican Party in the 2020 United States presidential election and Senate elections.

In December 2020, Plett vacationed in Mexico during the COVID-19 pandemic, despite government warnings advising against such trips. Plett returned to Canada on December 31 after reconsidering his decision. Earlier that year he had co-signed a directive barring all MPs and senators from travelling outside Canada as part of interparliamentary delegations.

Plett ceased to be a senator on May 14, 2025, upon reaching the mandatory retirement age of 75 years old for Canadian senators.

== Sources ==
- "About Don", Don Plett official website, nd
- Gohier, Philippe (11 January 2010), "Jacques Demers' move to the upper chamber hasn't gone smoothly", Maclean's
- Geddes, John (23 October 2013), Sen. Don Plett's reminder of what the Conservative base is supposed to be: Translation: 'Don't tell me about the base—I am the base', Maclean's
- "For the record: Don Plett objects to suspension of Duffy, Brazeau and Wallin", Maclean's, 24 October 2013
- "5 things to know about the Canada-China investment treaty", CBC News, 27 October 2012
- Lett, Dan (31 August 2009), "Note to PM: Fix Senate or appoint good people: It's time he took a stand", Winnipeg Free Press
- Lunn, Susan (12 September 2014), Canada-China investment treaty to come into force Oct. 1: Conservatives ratify foreign investment treaty more than 2 years after signing deal, CBC News
- Canada-China Bilateral Achievements, Press Release, Ottawa, Ontario, 11 January 2012, archived from the original on 8 February 2012
- Ivison, John (24 October 2013), John Ivison: Motion to suspend senators off base with hardcore Conservative, National Post
- Parliament of Canada (nd). "Terms of Reference". Canada-China Legislative Association. Ottawa, ON.
- Parliament of Canada (nda). "Executive Committee". Canada-China Legislative Association. Ottawa, ON.
- "Donald Neil Plett - Conservative Party of Canada", Parliament of Canada, Senators Biographies, ndb
