= Barry Barnet =

Canadian politician

The Honourable Barry Barnett ECNS

Member of the Nova Scotia House of Assembly for Hammonds Plains-Upper Sackville Sackville-Beaver Bank (1999-2003)
- In office July 27, 1999 – June 9, 2009
- Preceded by: Rosemary Godin
- Succeeded by: Mat Whynott

Personal details
- Born: June 13, 1961 (age 64) Halifax, Nova Scotia
- Party: Progressive Conservative
- Occupation: real estate agent

Barry Barnet (born June 13, 1961) is a Canadian politician. He represented the electoral districts of Sackville-Beaver Bank and Hammonds Plains-Upper Sackville in the Nova Scotia House of Assembly from 1999 to 2009. He was a member of the Progressive Conservative Party of Nova Scotia.

Barnet was elected a municipal councillor for Halifax County, Nova Scotia in 1993, and served on Halifax Regional Council following the formation of the Halifax Regional Municipality in 1996. He entered provincial politics in the 1999 election, defeating New Democrat incumbent Rosemary Godin in the Sackville-Beaver Bank riding. He was re-elected in the 2003 election. In August 2003, Barnet was appointed to the Executive Council of Nova Scotia as Minister of African Nova Scotian Affairs, and Minister of Service Nova Scotia and Municipal Relations.

When Rodney MacDonald took over as premier in February 2006, Barnet remained Minister of African Nova Scotian Affairs, but was moved to Minister of Health Promotion and Protection, and Minister of Communications Nova Scotia. Barnet was re-elected in the 2006 election, and was given a new role in cabinet as Minister of Volunteerism, while retaining the positions he held prior to the election. In January 2009, Barnet was named Minister of Energy and Minister responsible for Conserve Nova Scotia, while continuing to serve as Minister of African Nova Scotian Affairs. Barnet was defeated by New Democrat Mat Whynott when he ran for re-election in 2009.

In January 2010, Barnet became the Executive Director of the All Terrain Vehicle Association of Nova Scotia.

== Electoral record ==
=== 2009 general election ===
2009 Nova Scotia general election: Hammonds Plains-Upper Sackville
Party	Candidate	Votes	%	±%
New Democratic	Mat Whynott	4,815	50.03%	13.98%
Liberal	Patrick Doyle	2,381	24.74%	4.71%
Progressive Conservative	Barry Barnet	2,218	23.05%	-18.97%
Green	Shawn Redmond	210	2.18%	0.29%
Total		9,624	–	
Source(s) Source: Nova Scotia Legislature (2021). "Electoral History for Hammonds Plains-Upper Sackville" (PDF). nslegislature.ca.

=== 2006 general election ===
2006 Nova Scotia general election: Hammonds Plains-Upper Sackville
Party	Candidate	Votes	%	±%
Progressive Conservative	Barry Barnet	3,704	42.02%	0.88%
New Democratic	Mat Whynott	3,178	36.05%	8.45%
Liberal	Pam Streeter	1,766	20.03%	-9.92%
Green	Scott Cleghorn	167	1.89%	–
Total		8,815	–	
Source(s) Source: Nova Scotia Legislature (2021). "Electoral History for Hammonds Plains-Upper Sackville" (PDF). nslegislature.ca.

=== 2003 general election ===
2003 Nova Scotia general election: Hammonds Plains-Upper Sackville
Party	Candidate	Votes	%	±%
Progressive Conservative	Barry Barnet	3,322	41.14%	–
Liberal	Pam Streeter	2,419	29.96%	–
New Democratic	Brenda Haley	2,229	27.60%	–
Marijuana	Melanie Patriquen	105	1.30%	–
Total		8,075	–	
Source(s) Source: Nova Scotia Legislature (2021). "Electoral History for Hammonds Plains-Upper Sackville" (PDF). nslegislature.ca.

=== 1999 general election ===
1999 Nova Scotia general election: Sackville-Beaver Bank
Party	Candidate	Votes	%	±%
Progressive Conservative	Barry Barnet	3,573	40.60%	14.26%
New Democratic	Rosemary Godin	2,951	33.53%	-6.97%
Liberal	Bill MacDonald	2,276	25.86%	-7.29%
Total		8,800	–	
Source(s) Source: Nova Scotia Legislature (2021). "Electoral History for Sackville-Beaver Bank" (PDF). nslegislature.ca.
