= Rosemary Godin =

Canadian politician (born 1953)

MLA for Sackville-Beaver Bank
- In office 1998–1999
- Preceded by: Bill MacDonald
- Succeeded by: Barry Barnet

Personal details
- Born: 1953 (age 72–73) Barrie, Ontario
- Party: NDP
- Occupation: newspaper journalist, United Church minister

Rosemary Godin (born 1953) is a former Canadian politician and current writer and Christian minister. She was elected to the Nova Scotia House of Assembly in the 1998 provincial election. She represented the electoral district of Sackville-Beaver Bank as a member of the Nova Scotia New Democratic Party (NDP). She served for one term before she was defeated in the 1999 election.

== Career ==
Following her defeat, she became disillusioned with the NDP and left the party. In the 2003 provincial election, she ran as a Liberal in the riding of Dartmouth North and lost to incumbent NDP Jerry Pye.

Godin is a graduate of Mohawk College in Hamilton, Ontario with a degree in Communication Arts and a graduate of McMaster University in Hamilton with a BA in English. A long-time advocate for single parents and the poor, she entered the Atlantic School of Theology in 2004 to study theology; she received an M.Div and was ordained by the United Church of Canada in 2009.

Godin continues to write for newspapers and magazines and is a full-time ordained minister with the United Church of Canada in Sydney, Nova Scotia.

== Electoral record ==
=== 1999 general election ===
1999 Nova Scotia general election: Sackville-Beaver Bank
| Party | Candidate | Votes | % | ±% |
|---|---|---|---|---|
| Progressive Conservative | Barry Barnet | 3,573 | 40.60% | 14.26% |
| New Democratic | Rosemary Godin | 2,951 | 33.53% | -6.97% |
| Liberal | Bill MacDonald | 2,276 | 25.86% | -7.29% |
| Total | | 8,800 | – | |
Source(s) Source: Nova Scotia Legislature (2021). "Electoral History for Sackville-Beaver Bank" (PDF). nslegislature.ca.

=== 1998 general election ===
1998 Nova Scotia general election: Sackville-Beaver Bank
| Party | Candidate | Votes | % | ±% |
|---|---|---|---|---|
| New Democratic | Rosemary Godin | 3,821 | 40.50% | 8.87% |
| Liberal | Bill MacDonald | 3,128 | 33.16% | -8.28% |
| Progressive Conservative | Stephen Taylor | 2,485 | 26.34% | -0.59% |
| Total | | 9,434 | – | |
Source(s) Source: Nova Scotia Legislature (2021). "Electoral History for Sackville-Beaver Bank" (PDF). nslegislature.ca.
