= Sackville-Uniacke =

Provincial electoral district in Nova Scotia, Canada

Nova Scotia electoral district

Provincial electoral district
- Legislature: Nova Scotia House of Assembly
MLA
Brad Johns
Progressive Conservative
- District created: 2012
- First contested: 2013
- Last contested: 2024

Demographics
- Area (km²): 201
- Census division(s): Halifax County, Hants County
- Census subdivision(s): East Hants, Halifax Regional Municipality

Sackville-Uniacke is a provincial electoral district in Nova Scotia, Canada. It was created as Sackville-Beaver Bank in 2012 from parts of much of Hammonds Plains-Upper Sackville and part of Waverley-Fall River-Beaver Bank. The riding also existed from 1993 to 2003. Following the 2019 riding boundary review, the riding changed names to Sackville-Uniacke, and gained parts of Hants East (Uniacke area) and a small section of Waverley-Fall River-Beaver Bank, while losing some territory to Waverley-Fall River-Beaver Bank (the Woodbine Mobile Home area).

== Geography ==
Sackville-Uniacke covers 201 km^{2} (78 sq mi) of landmass.

== Members of the Legislative Assembly ==
This riding has elected the following members of the Legislative Assembly:

Sackville-Uniacke
Legislature	Years	Member	Party
Created from Sackville and Halifax-St. Margaret's
56th	1993–1998	Bill MacDonald	Liberal
57th	1998–1999	Rosemary Godin	New Democratic
58th	1999–2003	Barry Barnet	Progressive Conservative
Merged into Hammonds Plains-Upper Sackville & Waverley-Fall River-Beaver Bank
Re-created from Hammonds Plains-Upper Sackville
62nd	2013–2017	Stephen Gough	Liberal
63rd	2017–2021	Brad Johns	Progressive Conservative
64th	2021–2024	Brad Johns	Progressive Conservative
65th	2024–Present	Brad Johns	Progressive Conservative

== Election results ==
=== 2024 ===
2024 Nova Scotia general election
Party	Candidate	Votes	%	±%
Progressive Conservative	Brad Johns	2,925	48.99	5.16
New Democratic	Lisa Blackburn	2,529	42.35	20.68
Liberal	Thomas Trappenberg	517	8.66	-24.14
Total		5,971	–	
Total rejected ballots		58		
Turnout		6,394	42.26	
Eligible voters		15,130		
Progressive Conservative hold		Swing		
Source: Elections Nova Scotia

=== 2021 ===
2021 Nova Scotia general election
Party	Candidate	Votes	%	±%	Expenditures
Progressive Conservative	Brad Johns	3,104	43.82	+0.24	$22,052.59
Liberal	Donalda MacIsaac	2,323	32.80	+0.67	$30,586.74
New Democratic	Thomas Hill	1,535	21.67	+1.81	$31,376.42
Green	Carson LeQuesne	121	1.71	-1.73	$200.00
Total valid votes/expense limit		7,083	99.72	–	$81,042.78
Total rejected ballots		20	0.28		
Turnout		7,103	51.44		
Eligible voters		13,809			
Progressive Conservative hold		Swing		-0.22	
Source: Elections Nova Scotia

=== 2017 ===
2017 provincial election redistributed results
Party	Vote	%
Progressive Conservative	2,851	43.17
Liberal	2,191	33.18
New Democratic	1,271	19.21
Green	234	3.54
Atlantica	57	0.86

2017 Nova Scotia general election: Sackville-Beaver Bank
Party	Candidate	Votes	%	±%
Progressive Conservative	Brad Johns	2,923	43.58	+20.86
Liberal	Stephen Gough	2,155	32.13	-8.08
New Democratic	Dennis Kutchera	1,332	19.86	-17.21
Green	Michael Montgomery	231	3.44	
Atlantica	Rita Billington	66	0.98	
Total valid votes		6,707	100	
Total rejected ballots		14	0.21	
Turnout		6,721	48.69	
Eligible voters		13,803		
Progressive Conservative gain from Liberal		Swing		-3.12
Source: Elections Nova Scotia

=== 2013 ===
2013 Nova Scotia general election: Sackville-Beaver Bank
Party	Candidate	Votes	%	±%
Liberal	Stephen Gough	2,570	40.21%	–
New Democratic	Mat Whynott	2,369	37.07%	–
Progressive Conservative	Sarah Reeves	1,452	22.72%	–
Total		6,391	–	
Source(s) Source: Nova Scotia Legislature (2024). "Electoral History for Sackville-Beaver Bank" (PDF). nslegislature.ca. Nova Scotia, Chief Electoral Officer (2013). 39th Provincial General Election, October 8, 2013: Volume 1 – Statement of Votes & Statistics (PDF) (Report). Elections Nova Scotia. Archived from the original (PDF) on 10 April 2018.

=== 1999 ===
1999 Nova Scotia general election: Sackville-Beaver Bank
Party	Candidate	Votes	%	±%
Progressive Conservative	Barry Barnet	3,573	40.60%	14.26%
New Democratic	Rosemary Godin	2,951	33.53%	-6.97%
Liberal	Bill MacDonald	2,276	25.86%	-7.29%
Total		8,800	–	
Source(s) Source: Nova Scotia Legislature (2024). "Electoral History for Sackville-Beaver Bank" (PDF). nslegislature.ca. Nova Scotia, Chief Electoral Officer (1999). Returns of the General Election for the House of Assembly, Thirty-Fifth General Election (Report). Elections Nova Scotia.

=== 1998 ===
1998 Nova Scotia general election: Sackville-Beaver Bank
Party	Candidate	Votes	%	±%
New Democratic	Rosemary Godin	3,821	40.50%	8.87%
Liberal	Bill MacDonald	3,128	33.16%	-8.28%
Progressive Conservative	Stephen Taylor	2,485	26.34%	-0.59%
Total		9,434	–	
Source(s) Source: Nova Scotia Legislature (2024). "Electoral History for Sackville-Beaver Bank" (PDF). nslegislature.ca.

=== 1993 ===
1993 Nova Scotia general election: Sackville-Beaver Bank
Party	Candidate	Votes	%	±%
Liberal	Bill MacDonald	3,620	41.43%	–
New Democratic	Frank Sutherland	2,764	31.64%	–
Progressive Conservative	Stephen Taylor	2,353	26.93%	–
Total		8,737	–	
Source(s) Source: Nova Scotia Legislature (2024). "Electoral History for Sackville-Beaver Bank" (PDF). nslegislature.ca. Nova Scotia, Chief Electoral Officer (1993). Returns of the General Election for the House of Assembly, Thirty-Third General Election (PDF) (Report). Queen's Printer. Archived from the original (PDF) on 18 June 2018.

== See also ==
- List of Nova Scotia provincial electoral districts
- Canadian provincial electoral districts
