= Scott Lamb (lawyer) =

Canadian politician

President of the Conservative Party
- In office May 29, 2016 – March 19, 2021
- Leader: Rona Ambrose (interim); Andrew Scheer; Erin O'Toole
- Preceded by: John Walsh
- Succeeded by: Robert Batherson

Personal details
- Born: Edmonton, Alberta, Canada
- Party: Conservative
- Children: 1
- Education: University of British Columbia; University of Bristol
- Occupation: Lawyer

Scott Lamb is a Canadian politician and was the president of the Conservative Party of Canada. Before becoming national president, Lamb was the president of the North Vancouver Conservative riding association.

Lamb was born in Edmonton, Alberta. His family moved to Vancouver, British Columbia, when he was a teenager. He was educated at St. George's School. Lamb earned his undergraduate degree in international relations at the University of British Columbia in 1984. He earned his law degree from the University of Bristol in the United Kingdom in 1987. Lamb and his wife, Sara, have one son. He worked as a trademark, commercial, and real estate lawyer.

He was elected as the president of the Conservative Party of Canada in May 2016, taking over from John Walsh.
