= Canada-China Legislative Association =

The Canadian Group of the Canada-China Legislative Association (CCLA) is a non-partisan forum for the discussion of bilateral and multilateral issues facing the two countries. The CCLA was established in 1998 and promotes the exchange of information between Canadian parliamentarians, and the National Peoples' Congress of the People's Republic of China in order to encourage better understanding and closer ties between the two countries. There are annual bilateral meetings every fall, between National People's Congress members and the Canadian federal parliamentarians.

== Trade issues ==
China is Canada's second-largest merchandise trading partner, second to the United States. Bilateral merchandise trade reached $57.7 billion in 2010, while overall trade between the two countries more than tripled between 2001 and 2010. Canada currently has a Foreign Investment Promotion and Protection Agreement (FIPA) agreement with China that legislates the investment between Canada and China. A FIPA is not a free trade agreement but rather a bilateral agreement intended to "protect and promote" foreign investment through legally-binding rights and obligations. On 1 October 2014, the Canada-China Foreign Investment Promotion and Protection Agreement (FIPA) came into force. This date was announced by International Trade Minister Ed Fast in a news release on 12 September 2014.

== Annual General Meeting (AGM) ==
During the annual general meeting with the CCLA, the association will:

elect the members of the Executive Committee; receive a summary report of the expenses of the previous fiscal year and a written report of the association's activities for that year from the Co-Chairs; amend, where necessary and with one week's notice, the Group statutes by a two-thirds majority vote of the members present; make suggestions and adopt resolutions in accordance with the aims of the Group; if it is deemed appropriate, elect an Honorary Chair who shall be a member of the Group and who has demonstrated a strong and abiding interest in the aims of the Canada-China Legislative Association, who may from time to time be called upon to advise the Executive Committee and/or the Group in relation to any of their activities; and transact any other necessary business.

— Parliament of Canada

== Executive committee ==
- Hon. Donald Neil Plett, Senator (Co-Chair)
- Ms. Wai Young, M.P. (Co-Chair), On October 26, 2011, Young was elected Vice-Chair of the Canada-China Legislative Association (CCLA). On March 5, 2013, Young was elected Chair of the CCLA.
- Mr. Daryl Kramp, M.P. (Vice-Chair)
- Hon. Joseph A. Day, Senator (Vice-Chair)
- Hon. Terry Stratton, Senator (Vice-Chair)
- Ms. Olivia Chow, M.P. (Vice-Chair)
- Mr. Peter Julian, M.P. (Vice-Chair)
- Ms. Joyce Murray, M.P. (Vice-Chair)
- Mr. Andrew Saxton, M.P. (Vice-Chair)
- Mr. Merv Tweed, M.P. (Vice-Chair)
- Mr. Roger Prefontaine (Association Secretary)
