= John Walsh (Canadian politician) =

Politician in Canada

President of the Conservative Party
- In office December 7, 2009 – May 29, 2016
- Leader: Stephen Harper; Rona Ambrose (interim)
- Preceded by: Don Plett
- Succeeded by: Scott Lamb

Personal details
- Party: Conservative
- Spouse: Jillian Walsh
- Children: Duncan, Liam, and Finnian
- Education: Roberts Wesleyan College; Carleton University; Osgoode Hall Law School

John Walsh is the former President of the Conservative Party of Canada. He was succeeded by Scott Lamb. Walsh has degrees in history and philosophy, political science and international relations, and law. His wife, Jillian, lives with him and his three children—Duncan, Liam, and Finnian—in Toronto where he is Director and General Counsel in the Investment Division of a Canadian Pension Fund. Prior to this, he had been a corporate lawyer for 10 years. He has also held senior positions for the Minister of National Defence, the Prime Minister and the Minister of Finance. Walsh is active in his church community and is a member of the Sick Kids Leaders Cabinet.

His son, John Rupert (Age 3), died in July 1997. His daughter, Georgia (Age 6), died in July 2014.
