= Bill MacDonald (Canadian politician) =

Canadian politician

MLA for Sackville-Beaver Bank
- In office 1993–1998
- Preceded by: new riding
- Succeeded by: Rosemary Godin

Personal details
- Party: Liberal

Bill MacDonald is a Canadian politician. He represented the electoral district of Sackville-Beaver Bank in the Nova Scotia House of Assembly from 1993 to 1998. He was a member of the Nova Scotia Liberal Party.

== Political career ==
A long-time member of Halifax County Council, MacDonald first attempted to enter provincial politics in the 1984 election. He ran in the Sackville riding, but was defeated by New Democrat John Holm, finishing second ahead of Progressive Conservative incumbent Malcolm MacKay. MacDonald ran again in 1993, and won the new Sackville-Beaver Bank riding by 856 votes. MacDonald was defeated by New Democrat Rosemary Godin when he ran for re-election in 1998. MacDonald ran again in the 1999 election, but finished third, 1,300 votes behind the winner Barry Barnet.
