= Steve Craig (politician) =

Canadian politician

The Honourable Steve Craig ECNS

Member of the Nova Scotia House of Assembly for Sackville-Cobequid
- In office June 18, 2019 – October 27, 2024
- Preceded by: Dave Wilson
- Succeeded by: Paul Wozney

Minister of Fisheries and Aquaculture
- In office 31 August 2021 – 14 September 2023

Personal details
- Born: Stephen Allen Craig; March 19, 1955 (age 71) Halifax, Nova Scotia
- Party: Progressive Conservative

Stephen Allen Craig (born March 19, 1955) is a Canadian politician, who was elected to the Nova Scotia House of Assembly in a by-election on June 18, 2019. A member of the Progressive Conservatives, he represents the electoral district of Sackville-Cobequid.

Craig had previously sat on Halifax Regional Council, representing Lower Sackville since the 2012 Halifax Regional Municipality municipal election.

== Political career ==
On August 31, 2021, Craig was made Minister of Fisheries and Aquaculture.

On September 13, 2023, Craig announced he would not run in the next Nova Scotia general election, and was shuffled out of cabinet the following day.

== Personal life ==
Craig and his wife Shari live in Lower Sackville. They have two children, Marlo and Jonathan.

== Electoral record ==
Nova Scotia provincial by-election, June 18, 2019: Sackville-Cobequid Resignation of Dave Wilson
| Party | Candidate | Votes | % | ±% |
|---|---|---|---|---|
| Progressive Conservative | Steve Craig | 2,655 | 42.04 | +16.65 |
| New Democratic | Lara Fawthrop | 2,472 | 39.14 | -5.04 |
| Liberal | Michel Hindlet | 658 | 10.42 | -15.56 |
| Green | Anthony Edmonds | 488 | 7.73 | +4.39 |
| Atlantica | David F. Boyd | 43 | 0.68 | -0.44 |
| Total valid votes | | 6,316 | 99.68 | |
| Total rejected ballots | | 20 | 0.32 | -0.09 |
| Turnout | | 6,336 | 41.75 | -9.21 |
| Eligible voters | | 15,177 | | |
| Progressive Conservative gain from New Democratic | | Swing | | +10.84 |

=== District 15, Halifax Municipal Election 2012: Lower Sackville ===
| Candidate | Votes | % | ± |
|---|---|---|---|
| Steve Craig | 2,524 | 41.181 | |
| Stephen Taylor | 1,852 | 30.217 | |
| Curt Wentzell | 755 | 12.318 | |
| Janet Langille | 698 | 11.388 | |
| Ian Wilson | 300 | 4.895 | |
| Turnout | 6,129 | | |

2006 Nova Scotia general election: Sackville-Cobequid
| Party | Candidate | Votes | % | ±% |
|---|---|---|---|---|
| New Democratic Party | Dave Wilson | 4,477 | 54.50 | +9.12 |
| Progressive Conservative | Steve Craig | 2,499 | 30.42 | +2.05 |
| Liberal | David Major | 1,051 | 12.80 | -12.31 |
| Green | Elizabeth Nicolson | 187 | 2.28 | – |
| Total valid votes | | 8,214 | 99.74 | |
| Total rejected ballots | | 21 | 0.26 | -0.00 |
| Turnout | | 8,235 | 57.40 | -1.71 |
| Eligible voters | | 14,347 | | |
| New Democratic hold | | Swing | | +3.53 |
