= Sackville-Cobequid =

Provincial electoral district in Nova Scotia, Canada

Nova Scotia electoral district

Provincial electoral district
- Legislature: Nova Scotia House of Assembly
MLA
Paul Wozney
New Democratic
- District created: 1978
- First contested: 1978
- Last contested: 2024

Demographics
- Population (2011): 19,307
- Electors: 15,318
- Area (km²): 19
- Pop. density (per km²): 1,016.2
- Census division: Halifax RM
- Census subdivision: Halifax RM

Sackville—Cobequid is a provincial electoral district in Nova Scotia, Canada, that elects one member of the Nova Scotia House of Assembly.

The riding was created in 1978 when the former district of Halifax Cobequid was redistributed. In 1993 the name was changed to Sackville-Cobequid and it gained the Lakeview area from Bedford-Musquodoboit Valley and lost an area north of Beaverbank Road to Sackville-Beaver Bank. In 2003, there were minor changes made to the ridings northern boundary along Second Lake. In 2013, this district lost a small area along its northwestern edge to the new constituency of Sackville-Beaver Bank.

Its Member of the Legislative Assembly (MLA) since 2019 is Steve Craig of the Progressive Conservative party (PC), having succeeded longtime MLA Dave Wilson of the Nova Scotia New Democratic Party (NDP), who served from 2003 until resigning on November 16, 2018, triggering a by-election which Craig won.

Sackville-Cobequid became the only Progressive Conservative riding to be flipped away from the PCs in the 2024 election, instead electing the NDP candidate Paul Wozney.

== Geography ==
The land area of Sackville-Cobequid is 19 km^{2} (7.3 sq mi).

== Members of the Legislative Assembly ==
This riding has elected the following members of the Legislative Assembly:

Sackville-Cobequid
Legislature	Years	Member	Party
52nd	1978–1981	Malcolm MacKay	Progressive Conservative
53rd	1981–1984	Malcolm MacKay	Progressive Conservative
54th	1984–1988	John Holm	New Democratic
55th	1988–1993	John Holm	New Democratic
56th	1993–1998	John Holm	New Democratic
57th	1998–1999	John Holm	New Democratic
58th	1999–2003	John Holm	New Democratic
59th	2003–2006	Dave Wilson	New Democratic
60th	2006–2009	Dave Wilson	New Democratic
61st	2009–2013	Dave Wilson	New Democratic
62nd	2013–2017	Dave Wilson	New Democratic
63rd	2017–2018	Dave Wilson	New Democratic
63rd	2019–2021	Steve Craig	Progressive Conservative
64th	2021–2024	Steve Craig	Progressive Conservative
65th	2024–present	Paul Wozney	New Democratic

== Election results ==
=== 2024 ===
2024 Nova Scotia general election
Party	Candidate	Votes	%	±%
New Democratic	Paul Wozney	2,834	44.78	+12.19
Progressive Conservative	Paul Russell	2,771	43.78	+0.45
Liberal	Agatha Bourassa	724	11.44	-10.07
Total valid votes		6,329		
Total rejected ballots		58		
Turnout		6,394	42.26	
Eligible voters		15,130		
New Democratic gain		Swing		
Source: Elections Nova Scotia

=== 2021 ===
2021 Nova Scotia general election
Party	Candidate	Votes	%	±%	Expenditures
Progressive Conservative	Steve Craig	3,426	43.33	+1.29	$28,911.56
New Democratic	Lara Fawthrop	2,577	32.59	-6.55	$39,220.95
Liberal	Mary LeRoy	1,701	21.51	+11.09	$22,951.34
Green	Ian Dawson	203	2.57	-5.16	$1,752.50
Total valid votes/expense limit		7,907	99.76	–	$88,554.03
Total rejected ballots		19	0.24		
Turnout		7,926	51.39		
Eligible voters		15,424			
Progressive Conservative hold		Swing		+3.92	
Source: Elections Nova Scotia

=== 2019 by-election ===
Nova Scotia provincial by-election, June 18, 2019 Resignation of Dave Wilson
Party	Candidate	Votes	%	±%	Expenditures
Progressive Conservative	Steve Craig	2,655	42.04	+16.65	$44,922.79
New Democratic	Lara Fawthrop	2,472	39.14	-5.04	$85,411.90
Liberal	Michel Hindlet	658	10.42	-15.56	$19,322.25
Green	Anthony Edmonds	488	7.73	+4.39	$1,861.34
Atlantica	David F. Boyd	43	0.68	-0.44	$2,486.45
Total valid votes/Expense limit		6,316	99.68	–	$85,335.42
Total rejected ballots		20	0.32	-0.09	
Turnout		6,336	41.75	-9.21	
Eligible voters		15,177			
Progressive Conservative gain from New Democratic		Swing		+10.84	

=== 2017 ===
2017 Nova Scotia general election
Party	Candidate	Votes	%	±%
New Democratic	Dave Wilson	3,465	44.17	+5.73
Liberal	Michel Hindlet	2,038	25.98	-11.37
Progressive Conservative	John Giannakos	1,991	25.38	+4.10
Green	Tanner Montgomery	262	3.34	+0.41
Atlantica	Cathy Morgan	88	1.12	
Total valid votes		7,844	99.59	
Total rejected ballots		32	0.41	-0.34
Turnout		7,876	50.95	-1.67
Eligible voters		15,457		
New Democratic hold		Swing		+8.55
Source: Elections Nova Scotia

=== 2013 ===
2013 Nova Scotia general election
Party	Candidate	Votes	%	±%
New Democratic	Dave Wilson	2,983	38.45	-26.89
Liberal	Graham Cameron	2,898	37.35	+17.60
Progressive Conservative	Peter Mac Isaac	1,651	21.28	+8.82
Green	John H. Percy	227	2.93	+0.48
Total valid votes		7,759	99.26	
Total rejected ballots		58	0.74	+0.31
Turnout		7,817	52.63	-0.25
Eligible voters		14,853		
New Democratic hold		Swing		-22.24
Source: Elections Nova Scotia

=== 2009 ===
2009 Nova Scotia general election
Party	Candidate	Votes	%	±%
New Democratic	Dave Wilson	5,120	65.34%	10.83%
Liberal	Scott Hemming	1,548	19.75%	6.96%
Progressive Conservative	Jessica Alexander	976	12.46%	-17.97%
Green	Ian Charles	192	2.45%	0.17%
Total valid votes		7,836	99.57	
Total rejected ballots		34	0.43	+0.18
Turnout		7,870	52.88	-4.52
Eligible voters		14,882		
New Democratic hold		Swing		+1.94
Source(s) Source: Nova Scotia Legislature (2021). "Electoral History for Sackville-Cobequid" (PDF). nslegislature.ca.

=== 2006 ===
2006 Nova Scotia general election
Party	Candidate	Votes	%	±%
New Democratic	Dave Wilson	4,477	54.50%	9.12%
Progressive Conservative	Steve Craig	2,499	30.42%	2.05%
Liberal	David Major	1,051	12.80%	-12.31%
Green	Elizabeth Nicolson	187	2.28%	–
Total valid votes		8,214	99.74	
Total rejected ballots		21	0.26	-0.00
Turnout		8,235	57.40	-1.71
Eligible voters		14,347		
New Democratic hold		Swing		+3.53
Source(s) Source: Nova Scotia Legislature (2021). "Electoral History for Sackville-Cobequid" (PDF). nslegislature.ca.

=== 2003 ===
2003 Nova Scotia general election
Party	Candidate	Votes	%	±%
New Democratic	Dave Wilson	3,881	45.39%	-11.18%
Progressive Conservative	John Giannakos	2,426	28.37%	-0.46%
Liberal	Bob Harvey	2,147	25.11%	10.51%
Marijuana	Michael D. Patriquen	97	1.13%	–
Total valid votes		8,551	99.74	
Total rejected ballots		22	0.26	-0.44
Turnout		8,573	59.11	-4.82
Eligible voters		14,504		
New Democratic hold		Swing		-5.36
Source(s) Source: Nova Scotia Legislature (2021). "Electoral History for Sackville-Cobequid" (PDF). nslegislature.ca.

=== 1999 ===
1999 Nova Scotia general election
Party	Candidate	Votes	%	±%
New Democratic	John Holm	4,787	56.57%	-6.14%
Progressive Conservative	Wade Marshall	2,440	28.83%	14.16%
Liberal	Kevin Perkins	1,235	14.59%	-8.02%
Total valid votes		8,462	99.31	
Total rejected ballots		59	0.69	+0.41
Turnout		8,521	63.93	-3.33
Eligible voters		13,329		
New Democratic hold		Swing		-10.15
Source(s) Source: Nova Scotia Legislature (2021). "Electoral History for Sackville-Cobequid" (PDF). nslegislature.ca.

=== 1998 ===
1998 Nova Scotia general election
Party	Candidate	Votes	%	±%
New Democratic	John Holm	5,909	62.71%	14.74%
Liberal	Jack Brill	2,131	22.61%	-7.43%
Progressive Conservative	Rob Batherson	1,383	14.68%	-7.32%
Total valid votes		9,423	99.71	
Total rejected ballots		27	0.29	-0.19
Turnout		9,450	67.26	-6.62
Eligible voters		14,050		
New Democratic hold		Swing		+11.08
Source(s) Source: Nova Scotia Legislature (2021). "Electoral History for Sackville-Cobequid" (PDF). nslegislature.ca.

=== 1993 ===
1993 Nova Scotia general election
Party	Candidate	Votes	%	±%
New Democratic	John Holm	5,044	47.97%	11.81%
Liberal	Don Boutilier	3,159	30.04%	-2.02%
Progressive Conservative	George Mansfield	2,313	22.00%	-9.79%
Total valid votes		10,516	99.53	
Total rejected ballots		50	0.47	
Turnout		10,566	73.88	
Eligible voters		14,301		
Source(s) Source: Nova Scotia Legislature (2021). "Electoral History for Sackville-Cobequid" (PDF). nslegislature.ca. Nova Scotia. Chief Electoral Officer (1993). Returns of the General Election for the House of Assembly, Thirty-Third General Election (PDF). Queen's Printer.

=== 1988 ===
1988 Nova Scotia general election
Party	Candidate	Votes	%	±%
New Democratic	John Holm	5,430	36.15%	-4.10%
Liberal	Bruce Stephen	4,816	32.06%	-1.19%
Progressive Conservative	Dave Grace	4,774	31.78%	5.30%
Total valid votes		15,020	99.62	
Total rejected ballots		57	0.38	-0.25
Turnout		15,077	75.06	+11.31
Eligible voters		20,086		
New Democratic hold		Swing		-1.46
Source(s) Source: Nova Scotia Legislature (2021). "Electoral History for Sackville" (PDF). nslegislature.ca. Nova Scotia. Chief Electoral Officer (1988). Returns of the General Election for the House of Assembly, Thirty-Second General Election (PDF). Queen's Printer.

=== 1984 ===
1984 Nova Scotia general election
Party	Candidate	Votes	%	±%
New Democratic	John Holm	4,555	40.26%	14.39%
Liberal	Bill MacDonald	3,763	33.26%	1.68%
Progressive Conservative	Malcolm A. MacKay	2,997	26.49%	-16.07%
Total valid votes		11,315	99.37	
Total rejected ballots		72	0.63	
Turnout		11,387	63.75	
Eligible voters		17,862		
Source(s) Source: Nova Scotia Legislature (2021). "Electoral History for Sackville" (PDF). nslegislature.ca. Nova Scotia. Chief Electoral Officer (1984). Returns of the General Election for the House of Assembly, Thirty-First General Election (PDF). Queen's Printer.

=== 1981 ===
1981 Nova Scotia general election
Party	Candidate	Votes	%	±%
Progressive Conservative	Malcolm A. MacKay	4,687	42.55%	-8.34%
Liberal	Murdock MacKay	3,478	31.58%	-2.89%
New Democratic	John Holm	2,849	25.87%	16.26%
Total		11,014	–	
Source(s) Source: Nova Scotia Legislature (2021). "Electoral History for Sackville" (PDF). nslegislature.ca. Nova Scotia. Chief Electoral Officer (1981). Returns of the General Election for the House of Assembly, Thirteith General Election (PDF). Queen's Printer.

=== 1978 ===
1978 Nova Scotia general election
Party	Candidate	Votes	%	±%
Progressive Conservative	Malcolm A. MacKay	5,247	50.89%	–
Liberal	George Doucet	3,554	34.47%	–
New Democratic	Doug MacDonald	990	9.60%	–
Independent	Evan Morgan	519	5.03%	–
Total		10,310	–	
Source(s) Source: Nova Scotia Legislature (2021). "Electoral History for Sackville" (PDF). nslegislature.ca. Nova Scotia. Chief Electoral Officer (1978). Returns of the General Election for the House of Assembly, Twenty-Ninth General Election (PDF). Queen's Printer.

== See also ==
- List of Nova Scotia provincial electoral districts
- Canadian provincial electoral districts
