= Paul Wozney =

Canadian politician

Member of the Nova Scotia House of Assembly for Sackville-Cobequid
- Incumbent
- Assumed office November 26, 2024
- Preceded by: Steve Craig

Personal details
- Born: Halifax, Nova Scotia
- Party: Nova Scotia New Democratic Party
- Education: Dalhousie University McGill University

Paul Wozney is a Canadian politician who was elected to the Nova Scotia House of Assembly in the 2024 general election, representing Sackville-Cobequid as a member of the New Democratic Party. He serves as the Official Opposition critic for Labour, Education, Advanced Education, and the Public Service Commission.

== Early life and education ==
Wozney was born in Halifax and attended J. L. Ilsley High School. He graduated from Dalhousie University in 1996 with a Bachelor of Arts and from McGill University in 1998 with a Bachelor of Education.

== Career ==
A teacher by training, Wozney was president of the Nova Scotia Teachers Union from 2018 to 2022.

In 2026, Wozney endorsed Rob Ashton in that year's federal NDP leadership race. In October 2026, he was removed as party whip after making a social media post that praised the 2026 French student protests.

== Electoral record ==
2024 Nova Scotia general election: Sackville-Cobequid
| Party | Candidate | Votes | % | ±% |
|---|---|---|---|---|
| New Democratic | Paul Wozney | 2,834 | 44.78 | +12.19 |
| Progressive Conservative | Paul Russell | 2,771 | 43.78 | +0.45 |
| Liberal | Agatha Bourassa | 724 | 11.44 | -10.07 |
| Total valid votes | | 6,329 | | |
| Total rejected ballots | | 58 | | |
| Turnout | | 6,394 | 42.26 | |
| Eligible voters | | 15,130 | | |
| New Democratic gain from Progressive Conservative | | Swing | | +6.32 |
Source: Elections Nova Scotia
