= Mat Whynott =

Canadian politician

Mathew Whynott

MLA for Hammonds Plains-Upper Sackville
- In office June 19, 2009 – October 8, 2013
- Preceded by: Barry Barnet
- Succeeded by: riding dissolved

Personal details
- Born: June 20, 1985 (age 40) Halifax, Nova Scotia, Canada
- Party: New Democratic Party

Mathew Whynott is a Canadian politician, who was elected to the Nova Scotia House of Assembly in the 2009 provincial election. From 2009 to 2013, he represented the electoral district of Hammonds Plains-Upper Sackville as a member of the New Democratic Party. He is the youngest person ever elected as MLA in Nova Scotia, having entered office one day before his 24th birthday.

== Early life and community involvement ==
Whynott grew up in Lower Sackville and attended Sackville High School. Throughout his years before become a MLA, Whynott was involved with many community groups and organizations including the Knox United Church Council in Lower Sackville, Big Brothers Big Sisters, the Dal/IWK Adolescent Mental Health Committee and the Sherbrooke Lake United Church Camp. Whynott also spent time working with the Cobequid Community Health Board in conjunction with the Youth at Risk Network to establish a Youth at Risk Centre for the Cobequid Health Region.

In 2006, Whynott was selected for an all-party group to travel to the Middle East in conjunction with the Canada Israel Committee to learn, first hand, about the conflict. Whynott was majoring in political science at St. Mary's University.

In 2009, Whynott was chosen as one of the Chronicle Herald's Top 20 20-Something's for his work in the Sackville community. He followed this honor up with attending an international conference in Trinidad and Tobago and he has represented Canada at the United Nations, speaking at the UN's World Programme of Action for Youth. He lives in Lower Sackville and has three children.

== Political career ==
In 2004, Whynott was appointed by the Government of Nova Scotia to be the Co-Chair of the Nova Scotia Youth Advisory Council. He has also served on federal and provincial government committees for Tobacco Control.

In 2005, Whynott was hired by the Nova Scotia NDP Caucus office as a Researcher, where he held the role until being elected to the Nova Scotia House of Assembly in June 2009.

=== 2006 election ===
As a first-time candidate, Whynott finished second in the Hammonds Plains-Upper Sackville riding in the 2006 election. Whynott won 36.05% of the vote, 5.97% and 516 votes behind Conservative incumbent and cabinet minister, Barry Barnet.

=== 2009 election ===
Whynott ran for the NDP for the second time in the 2009 election campaign. Building off his gains in his 2006 election campaign, Whynott was elected in Hammonds Plains-Upper Sackville, defeating Barnet, Liberal candidate, Patrick Doyle, and Green candidate Shawn Redmond. On June 9, 2009, Whynott took the riding with more votes than the Liberal and Conservative candidates combined, becoming the youngest MLA ever elected in Nova Scotia.

=== Member of the Legislative Assembly ===
Following his victory in the 2009 election, Whynott was named the Government Caucus Whip and served on the legislative committees of Public Accounts, Assembly Matters and was the Chair of the Human Resources Committee. On November 26, 2010, he was named the Chair of the provincial Suburban Priorities Team, and in 2011, he was chosen as a member of the provincial Cyberbullying Task Force where he facilitated focus groups across the province on the challenges and possible solutions to cyber bullying

On January 31, 2012, Whynott officially endorsed NDP leadership candidate Brian Topp for the Leader of the New Democratic Party of Canada.

In the 2013 election, Whynott was defeated by Liberal Stephen Gough in Sackville-Beaver Bank.
