= Conservative Party of Canada =

Federal political party

Conservative Party of Canada Parti conservateur du Canada
- Abbreviation: CPC; PCC
- Leader: Pierre Poilievre
- President: Christina Mitas
- House leader: Andrew Scheer
- Deputy leaders: Melissa Lantsman; Tim Uppal
- Senate leader: Leo Housakos
- Founders: Stephen Harper (Note: As leader of the Canadian Conservative Reform Alliance, and co-signatory to the CA–PC merger agreement to form the Conservative Party of Canada.); Peter MacKay (Note: As leader of the Progressive Conservative Party of Canada, and co-signatory to the CA–PC merger agreement to form the Conservative Party of Canada.)
- Founded: December 7, 2003 (22 years, 350 days)
- Merger of: Progressive Conservative; Canadian Alliance
- Headquarters: 1800–66 Slater Street; Ottawa, Ontario; K1P 5H1
- Membership (2022): ▲678,708
- Ideology: Conservatism (Canadian); Economic liberalism
- Political position: Centre-right to right-wing
- Regional affiliation: Asia Pacific Democracy Union
- International affiliation: International Democracy Union
- Colours: Blue
- Slogan: Canada First – for a Change (2025)
- Senate: 13 / 105
- House of Commons: 137 / 343

Website
- conservative.ca

The Conservative Party of Canada (CPC; French: Parti conservateur du Canada; PCC), sometimes referred to as the Tories, is a federal political party in Canada. The party sits at the centre-right to right of the Canadian political spectrum, with their federal rival, the centre to centre-left Liberal Party of Canada, positioned to their left. The Conservatives are defined as a "big tent" party, practicing "brokerage politics" (Note: Brokerage politics: "A Canadian term for successful big tent parties that embody a pluralistic catch-all approach to appeal to the median Canadian voter ... adopting centrist policies and electoral coalitions to satisfy the short-term preferences of a majority of electors who are not located on the ideological fringe.") and welcoming a broad variety of members, including "Red Tories" and "Blue Tories".

The CPC was formed by the merger of the two main right-leaning parties, the Progressive Conservative Party (PC Party) and the Canadian Alliance. The PC Party's roots go back to the original Conservative Party of Canada, which had formed numerous governments dating back to Canadian Confederation in 1867. In the 1993 federal election, the PC Party's Western Canadian support transferred to the Reform Party, which later became the Canadian Alliance. When it became clear that neither the PC Party nor the Canadian Alliance could beat the incumbent Liberals that had governed since the 1993 election, an effort to unite the right-of-centre parties emerged. In 2003, the Canadian Alliance and the PCs merged, forming the Conservative Party of Canada.

During the Conservative Party's governance of Canada from 2006 to 2015, its economic policies included reducing sales tax, reducing income taxes, reducing business taxes, balancing the national budget, permitting the construction of several pipelines, and creating the tax-free savings account (TFSA) and the Universal Child Care Benefit. In social policy, the government eliminated the long-gun registry, introduced mandatory minimum sentences for violent crimes, and raised the age of consent to 16 years of age. Internationally it supported the State of Israel, withdrew Canada from the Kyoto Protocol, and negotiated the Comprehensive Economic and Trade Agreement (CETA) and the Trans-Pacific Partnership (TPP).

Under its first leader, Stephen Harper, the party governed with two minority governments after the federal elections of 2006 and 2008. It then won a majority government in the 2011 federal election before being defeated in the 2015 federal election by a majority Liberal government led by Justin Trudeau. Despite winning a plurality of the vote in each election, the party remained as Official Opposition after losing the 2019 and 2021 elections under its second and third leaders, Andrew Scheer and Erin O'Toole respectively. Pierre Poilievre was elected leader in the 2022 leadership election, leading the party through the 2025 election, which it again lost to the Liberals, while retaining opposition status.

== History ==
=== Predecessors ===
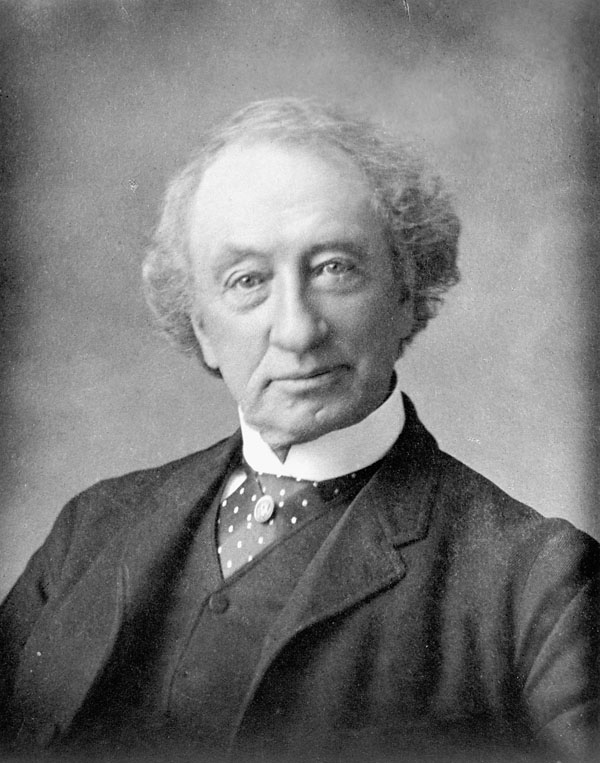
John A. Macdonald, Prime Minister (1867–1873, 1878–1891), Canada's first Prime Minister and leader of the Liberal-Conservative Party, one of the party's predecessors

The Conservative Party is political heir to a series of right-of-centre parties that have existed in Canada, beginning with the Upper Canada Tories of the nineteenth century. John A. Macdonald and George-Étienne Cartier later founded the Liberal-Conservative Party. The party became known simply as the Conservative Party after 1873, and the Progressive Conservative Party after 1942. Like its historical predecessors and conservative parties in some other Commonwealth nations (such as the Conservative Party of the United Kingdom), members of the present-day Conservative Party of Canada are sometimes referred to as "Tories". The modern Conservative Party of Canada is also legal heir to the heritage of the historical conservative parties by virtue of assuming the assets and liabilities of the former Progressive Conservative Party upon the merger of 2003.

In 1984, the Progressive Conservative Party's electoral fortunes made a massive upturn under its new leader, Brian Mulroney, who mustered a large coalition of westerners irritated over the Liberal government's National Energy Program, suburban and small-town Ontarians, and Quebec nationalists who were angered over Quebec not having distinct status in the Constitution of Canada signed in 1982. This led to a huge landslide victory for the Progressive Conservative Party.

In the late 1980s and 1990s, federal conservative politics became split by the creation of a new western-based protest party, the populist and social conservative Reform Party of Canada created by Preston Manning, the son of an Alberta Social Credit premier, Ernest Manning. Westerners reportedly felt betrayed by the federal Progressive Conservative Party, seeing it as catering to Quebec and urban Ontario interests over theirs. In 1989, Reform made headlines in the political scene when its first member of Parliament (MP), Deborah Grey, was elected in a by-election in Alberta, which was a shock to the PCs, who had almost complete electoral dominance over the province for years. Another defining event for western conservatives was when Mulroney accepted the results of an unofficial Senate election held in Alberta, which resulted in the appointment of a Reformer, Stanley Waters, to the Senate.

In the 1993 election, support for the Progressive Conservative Party collapsed, and the party's representation in the House of Commons dropped from an absolute majority of seats to only two. Meanwhile, the Reform Party took Western Canada and became the dominant conservative party in Canada. The PC Party rebounded slightly with 20 seats in 1997 and 12 in 2000, but was unable to challenge Reform in Western Canada; meanwhile, Reform dominated the western provinces but struggled to win seats east of Manitoba. Their electoral problems were accentuated by Canada's single member plurality electoral system, which resulted in numerous seats being won by the Liberal Party, even when the total number of votes cast for PC and Reform Party candidates was substantially in excess of the total number of votes cast for the Liberal candidate. This led to calls for the two parties to merge.

=== Foundation and early history ===
On October 15, 2003, after months of talks between the Canadian Alliance (formerly the Reform Party) and Progressive Conservative Party, Stephen Harper (then the leader of the Canadian Alliance) and Peter MacKay (then the leader of the Progressive Conservatives) announced the "'Conservative Party Agreement-in-Principle", that would merge their parties to create the new Conservative Party of Canada. After the agreement-in-principle was ratified by the membership of both parties, the new party was officially registered with Elections Canada on December 7. Senator John Lynch-Staunton, a PC, was named interim leader, pending the outcome of the party's inaugural leadership election.

The merger was opposed by some elements in both parties. In the PCs in particular, the merger process resulted in organized opposition, and in a substantial number of prominent members refusing to join the new party. Former leadership candidate David Orchard argued that his written agreement with MacKay, which had been signed a few months earlier at the 2003 Progressive Conservative Leadership convention, excluded any such merger. Orchard announced his opposition to the merger before negotiations with the Canadian Alliance had been completed. Over the course of the following year, Orchard led an unsuccessful legal challenge to the merger of the two parties.

In October and November, during the course of the PC party's process of ratifying the merger, three sitting Progressive Conservative MPs — André Bachand, John Herron and former prime minister Joe Clark — announced they would not join the new Conservative Party caucus. In the months following the merger, Rick Borotsik, who had been elected as Manitoba's only PC, became openly critical of the new party's leadership, while former leadership candidate Scott Brison and former Alliance leadership candidate Keith Martin left the party. Brison, Herron and Martin ran for the Liberal Party in the next election, while Clark, Bachand and Borotsik retired. Three senators — William Doody, Norman Atkins, and Lowell Murray — declined to join the new party and continued to sit in the upper house as a rump caucus of Progressive Conservatives, and a fourth (Jean-Claude Rivest) soon left to sit as an independent. In February 2005, Prime Minister Paul Martin appointed two anti-merger Progressive Conservatives, Nancy Ruth and Elaine McCoy, to the Senate. In March 2006, Nancy Ruth joined the new Conservative Party.

==== Inaugural leadership election ====
In the immediate aftermath of the merger announcement, some Conservative activists hoped to recruit former Ontario premier Mike Harris for the leadership. Harris declined the invitation, as did New Brunswick premier Bernard Lord and Alberta premier Ralph Klein. Outgoing Progressive Conservative leader Peter MacKay also announced he would not seek the leadership, as did former Democratic Representative Caucus leader Chuck Strahl. Jim Prentice, who had been a candidate in the 2003 PC leadership contest, entered the Conservative leadership race in mid-December but dropped out in mid-January because of an inability to raise funds so soon after his earlier leadership bid.

In the end, there were three candidates in the party's first leadership election: former Canadian Alliance leader Stephen Harper, former Magna International CEO Belinda Stronach, and former Ontario provincial PC Cabinet minister Tony Clement. Voting took place on March 20, 2004. A total of 97,397 ballots were cast. Harper won on the first ballot with 56.2% of the vote; Stronach received 34.5%, and Clement received 9.4%.

=== Stephen Harper (2004–2015) ===
==== In opposition (2004–2006) ====
Two months after Harper's election as leader, Prime Minister Paul Martin called a general election for June 28, 2004.

For the first time since the 1993 election, a Liberal government would have to deal with an opposition party that was generally seen as being able to form government. The Liberals attempted to counter this with an early election call, as this would give the Conservatives less time to consolidate their merger. During the first half of the campaign, polls showed a rise in support for the new party, leading some pollsters to predict the election of a minority Conservative government. Momentum stalled after several Conservative candidates made controversial remarks about homosexuality, official bilingualism and abortion, allowing the Liberal Party to warn of a "hidden agenda". Ultimately, Harper's new Conservatives emerged from the election with a much larger parliamentary caucus of 99 MPs while the Liberals were reduced to a minority government of 135 MPs, twenty short of a majority.

In 2005, some political analysts such as former Progressive Conservative pollster Allan Gregg and Toronto Star columnist Chantal Hébert suggested that the then-subsequent election could result in a Conservative government if the public were to perceive the Tories as emerging from the party's founding convention (then scheduled for March 2005 in Montreal) with clearly defined, moderate policies with which to challenge the Liberals. The convention provided the public with an opportunity to see the Conservative Party in a new light, appearing to have reduced the focus on its controversial social conservative agenda. It retained its fiscal conservative appeal by espousing tax cuts, smaller government, and more decentralization by giving the provinces more taxing powers and decision-making authority in joint federal-provincial programs. The party's law and order package was an effort to address rising homicide rates, which had gone up 12% in 2004.

On November 24, 2005, Harper introduced a motion of no confidence which, with the backing of the other two opposition parties, passed on November 28, 2005. This resulted in an election scheduled for January 23, 2006. The Conservatives started off the first month of the campaign by making a series of policy-per-day announcements, which included a Goods and Services Tax reduction and a child-care allowance. These announcements played to Harper's strengths as a policy wonk, as opposed to the 2004 election and summer 2005 where he tried to overcome the perception that he was cool and aloof. Though his party showed only modest movement in the polls, Harper's personal approval numbers, which had always trailed his party's significantly, began to rise. In addition, the party also received more newspaper endorsements than in 2004.

On January 23, 2006, the Conservatives won 124 seats, compared to 103 for the Liberals. The results made the Conservatives the largest party in the 308-member House of Commons, enabling them to form a minority government.

==== In government (2006–2015) ====
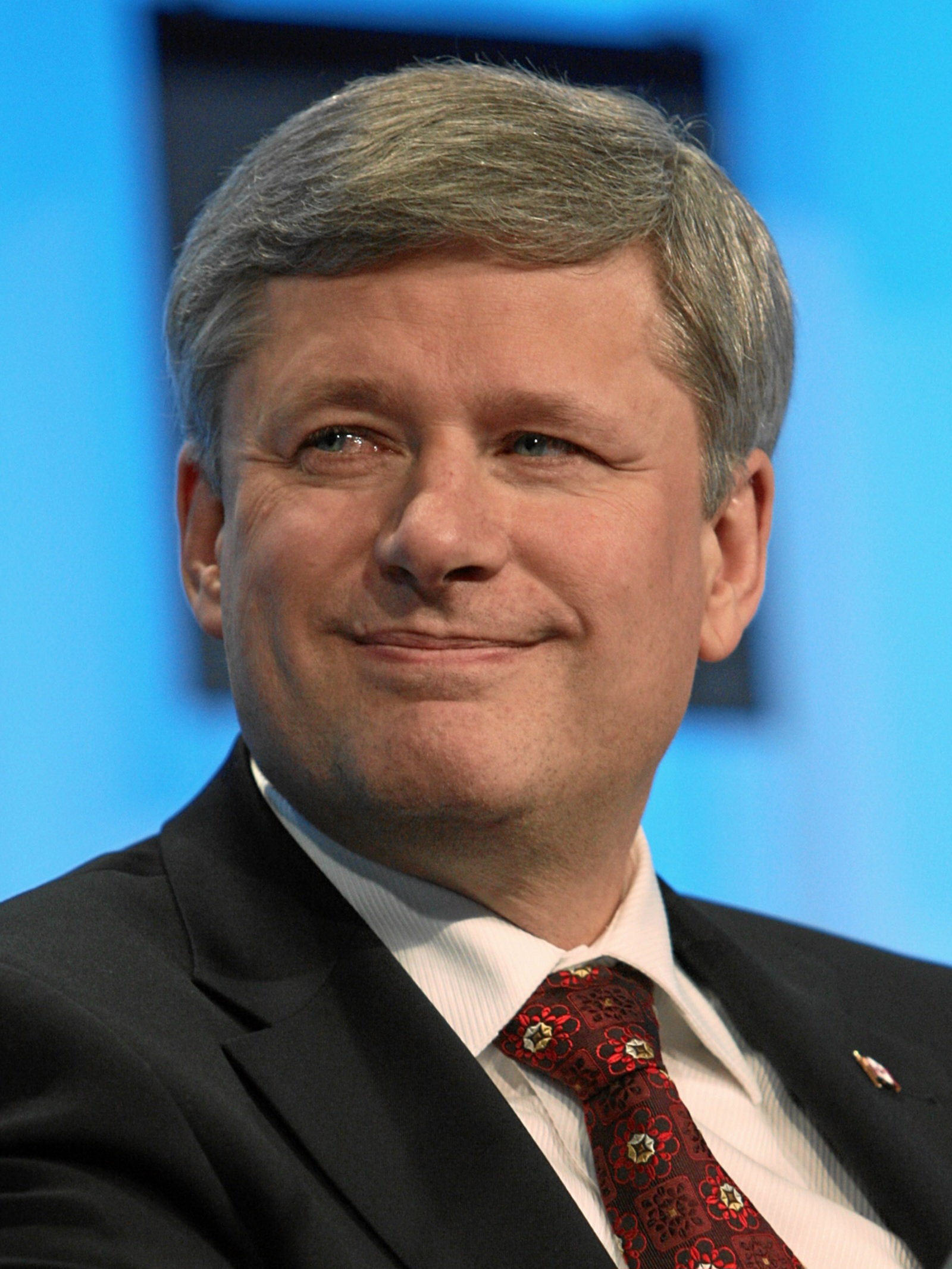
Stephen Harper, Prime Minister (2006–2015)

On February 6, 2006, Harper and his Cabinet were sworn in. The Conservative Party confronted the In and Out scandal, regarding improper election spending during the 2006 election. The government's first budget produced a nearly $14 billion surplus, a number slightly greater than the Martin government. The budget also drastically increased military spending and scrapped funding for the Kyoto Protocol and the Kelowna Accord. Later, the government introduced the tax-free savings account (TFSA). The government passed the Veterans' Bill of Rights, which guaranteed benefits for veterans from Veterans Affairs Canada, in addition to guaranteeing equality of veterans and referring to them as "special citizens". The government also passed the Québécois nation motion which would "recognize the Québécois as a nation within a united Canada", and introduced a motion to reverse the same-sex marriage law implemented by the Martin government, which was defeated.

Deadlock between the Conservatives and the Liberals, the New Democratic Party, and the Bloc Québécois led to the calling of the October 2008 federal election, in which the Conservatives won a stronger minority. Shortly after, the Conservatives fought off a vote of non-confidence by a potential governing coalition of opposition parties by proroguing parliament. In his second term, Harper's government responded to the 2008 financial crisis and the Great Recession by introducing the 2009 Canadian federal budget that implemented major personal income tax cuts. However, these tax cuts, along with increases in spending to mitigate the 2008 financial crisis, grew deficit spending to $55.6 billion – Canada's largest federal deficit up to that time.

A March 2011 non-confidence vote that found the Harper government to be in contempt of Parliament dissolved Parliament and triggered an election. In this election, the Conservatives won a majority government. The Harper government withdrew Canada from the Kyoto Protocol and repealed the long-gun registry. In foreign policy, the government passed the Anti-terrorism Act, launched Operation Impact to combat ISIL, negotiated the Comprehensive Economic and Trade Agreement (CETA) with the European Union, and negotiated the Trans-Pacific Partnership (TPP). The Conservatives also gained controversy surrounding the Canadian Senate expenses scandal and the Robocall scandal; the latter involved robocalls and real-person calls that were designed to result in voter suppression in the 2011 election. In economic policy, the government launched Canada's Global Markets Action Plan to generate employment opportunities for Canadians by expanding Canadian businesses and investment in other countries, and balanced the budget in the 2014 federal budget, producing a minor deficit of $550 million.

In the 2015 federal election, after nearly a decade in power, the Conservatives were defeated by Justin Trudeau and his Liberal Party. Harper stepped down as leader on the election day on October 19. Journalist John Ibbitson of The Globe and Mail described Harper as "the most conservative leader Canada has ever known."

=== In opposition (2015–present) ===
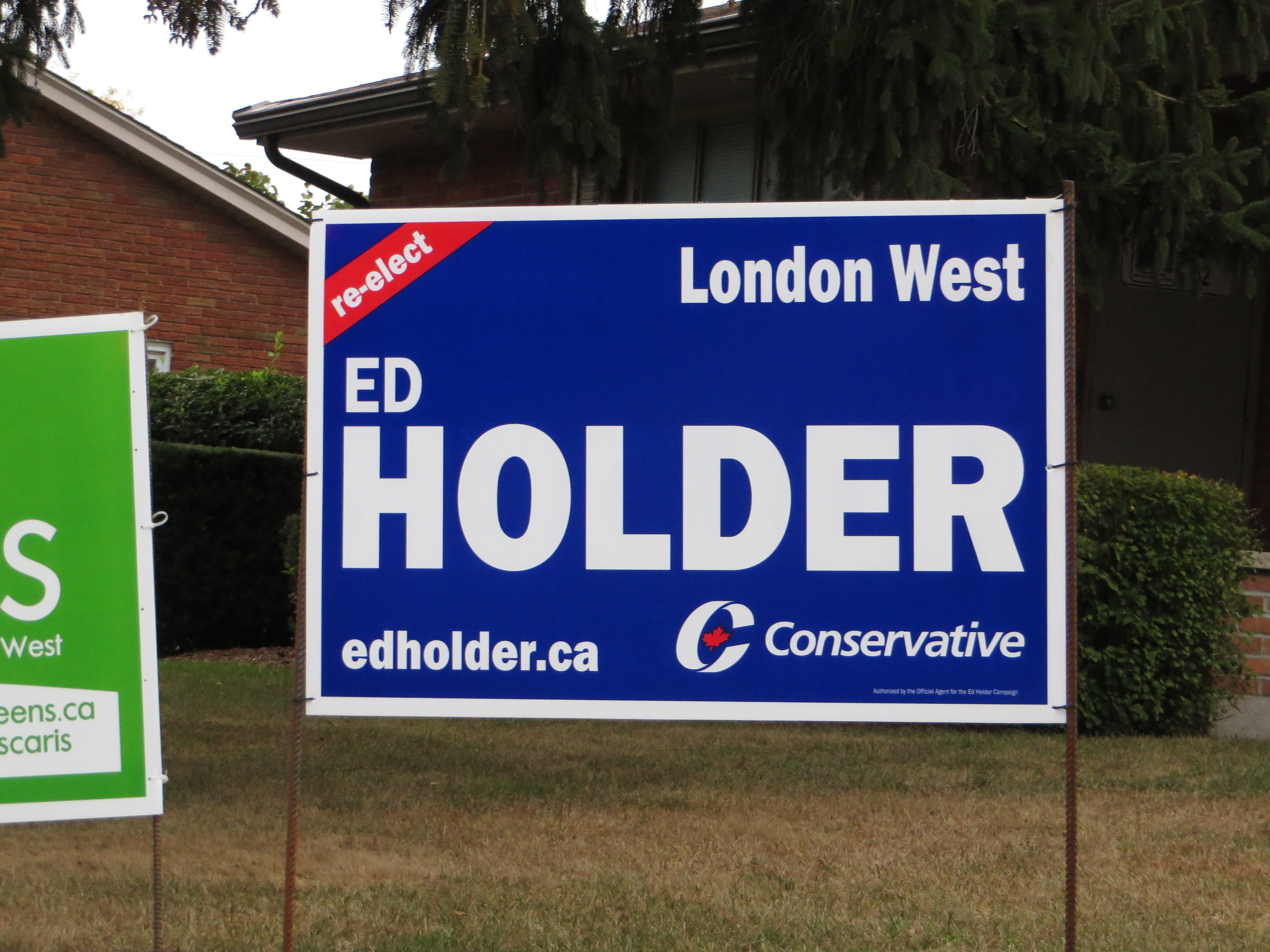
A sign advertising the Conservative Party of Canada in the 2015 Canadian federal election

==== First interim leadership (2015–2017) ====
Following the election of the Liberals and Harper's resignation as party leader in the 2015 election, it was announced that an interim leader would be selected to serve until a new leader could be chosen. That was completed at the caucus meeting of November 5, 2015 where Rona Ambrose, MP for Sturgeon River—Parkland and a former cabinet minister, was elected by a vote of MPs and Senators.

Some members of the party's national council were calling for a leadership convention as early as May 2016 according to Maclean's magazine. However, some other MPs wanted the vote to be delayed until the spring of 2017. On January 19, 2016, the party announced that a permanent leader will be chosen on May 27, 2017.

==== Andrew Scheer (2017–2020) ====
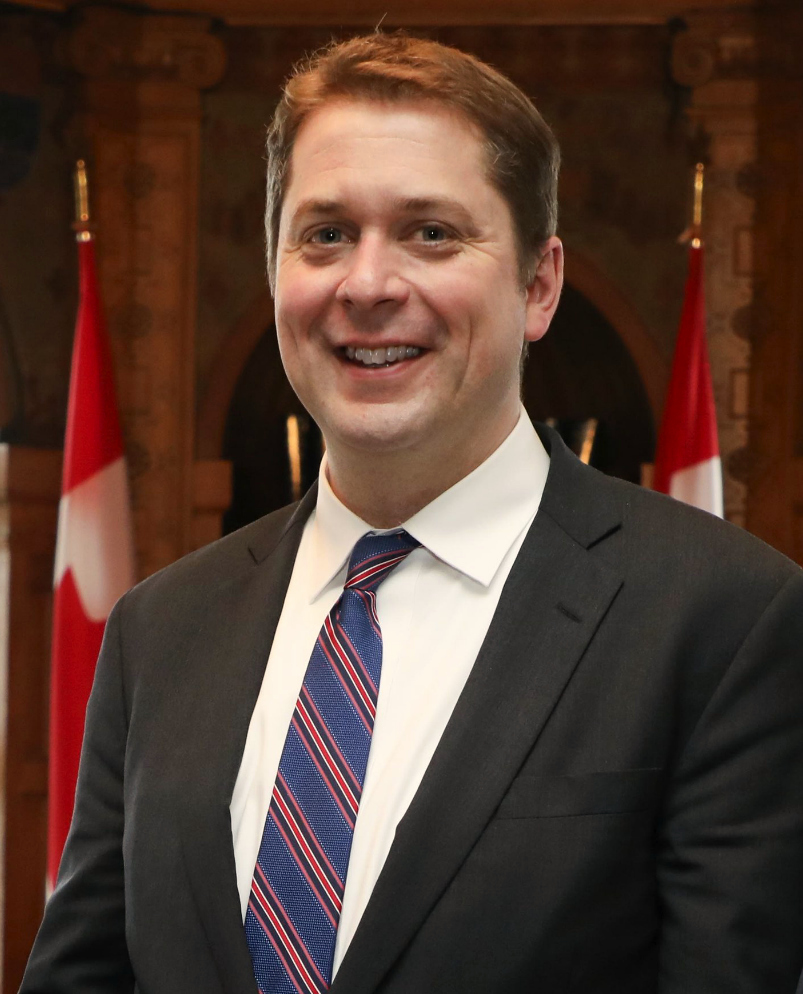
Andrew Scheer, leader (2017–2020) and parliamentary leader (2025–present)

On September 28, 2016, former Speaker of the House of Commons Andrew Scheer announced his bid for the leadership of the party. On May 27, 2017, Scheer was elected as the second permanent leader of the Conservative Party of Canada, beating runner-up MP Maxime Bernier and more than 12 others with 50.95% of the vote through 13 rounds. Bernier left the Conservatives in 2018 to form the People's Party of Canada, which campaigned on right-wing populist positions in subsequent elections but failed to win a seat.

Under Scheer, the Conservatives prioritized repealing the Liberal government's carbon tax, pipeline construction, and balancing the budget within five years had they formed government in 2019. Scheer is a social conservative; he is personally pro-life and opposes same-sex marriage, though like Harper, he stated he would not attempt to overturn the legality of both laws.

The Conservative Party entered the October 2019 federal election campaign neck-in-neck with the Liberals after the SNC-Lavalin affair earlier that year involving Justin Trudeau, but the election resulted in a Liberal minority government victory. The Conservatives did, however, win the largest share of the popular vote, and gained 26 seats. Notably, they won every single seat in Saskatchewan and all but one in Alberta. While the Conservative Party has historically been highly successful in Alberta and Saskatchewan, some point to a growing sense of Western alienation to explain the results. Following the election, Scheer faced criticism from within the party for failing to defeat Trudeau, who gained criticism for his handling of the SNC-Lavalin affair and for his wearing of brownface and blackface; the latter incident was made public during the election campaign. Scheer announced his pending resignation on December 12, 2019, after the CBC reported that the Conservative party had been paying part of his children's private school tuition. He remained party leader, until his successor was chosen in August 2020.

==== Erin O'Toole (2020–2022) ====
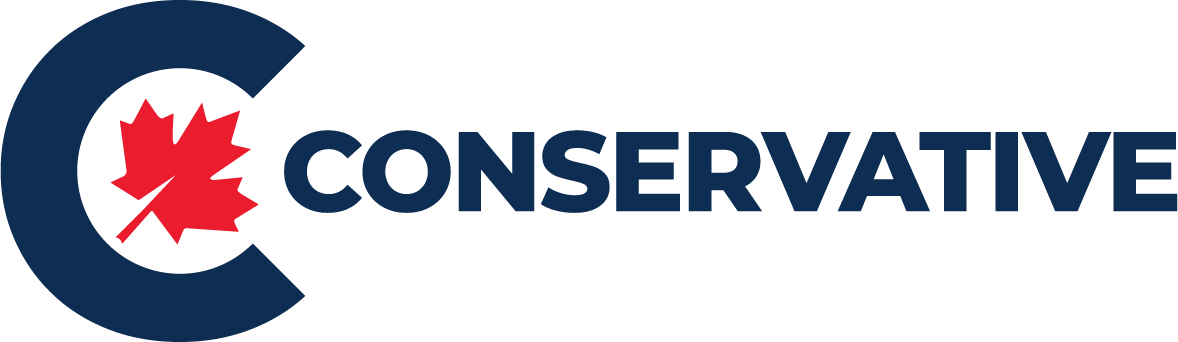
Logo of the CPC from 2020 to 2023

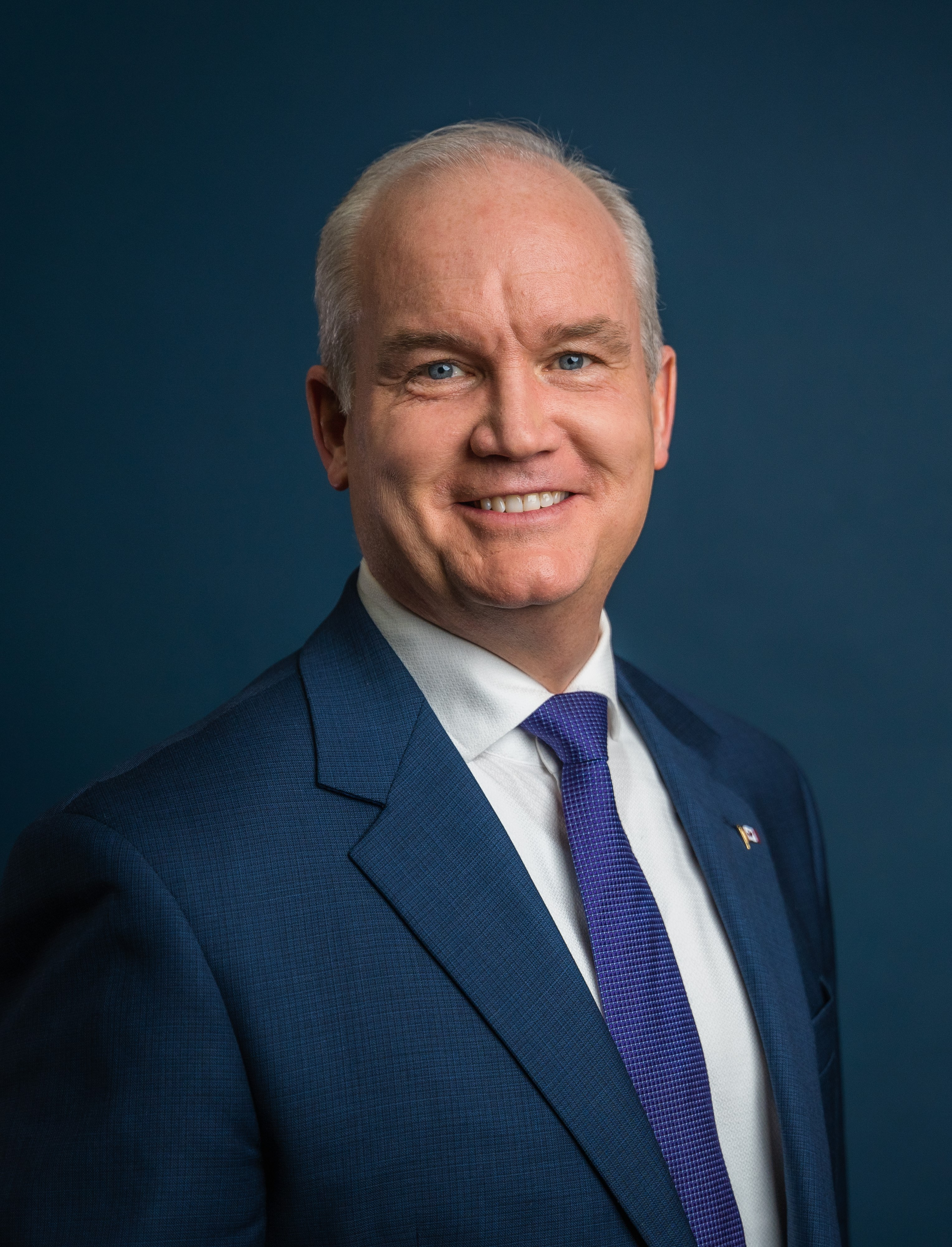
Erin O'Toole, leader (2020–2022)

A leadership election to replace Scheer was held in 2020, which was won by former Veterans Affairs Minister Erin O'Toole on August 24, 2020.

Though running for the leadership on a "true blue" platform, O'Toole started to nudge the Conservative Party to the political centre as leader. Despite campaigning against the Liberal government's carbon tax during his leadership campaign, O'Toole reversed his position in April 2021, instead advocating for a low carbon savings account. In contrast to his two predecessors as leader, O'Toole is pro-choice and supports same-sex marriage.

Prime Minister Trudeau called the September 2021 federal election in the hopes of winning a majority government, though in the middle of the campaign O'Toole's Conservatives were tied with the Liberals, if not slightly ahead of the Liberals in the polls. During the campaign, O'Toole stated he would balance the budget within the next 10 years and reversed his support for repealing the Liberal government's "assault-style" weapons ban. In a similar manner to the 2019 election, the Conservatives again won the popular vote but fell short of gaining the largest amount of seats, enabling the Liberal Party under Justin Trudeau to form another minority government.

As a result, party members were undecided on whether he should continue as leader. On October 5, the Conservative caucus voted to adopt the provisions of the Reform Act, giving caucus the power to trigger a leadership review. O'Toole denied that it represented a threat to his leadership, insisting that the caucus was united as a team and that, as a supporter of the Act, he had encouraged his caucus to adopt all of its provisions.

On January 31, 2022, Conservative Calgary Heritage MP Bob Benzen submitted a letter with signatures from 35 Conservative MPs calling for a leadership review on O'Toole's leadership to the Conservative caucus chair, Scott Reid. In the letter, Benzen criticized O'Toole's reversal on repealing the Liberal government's carbon tax and assault weapons ban. On February 2, 2022, O'Toole was removed as leader by a margin of 73 to 45 votes.

==== Second interim leadership (2022) ====
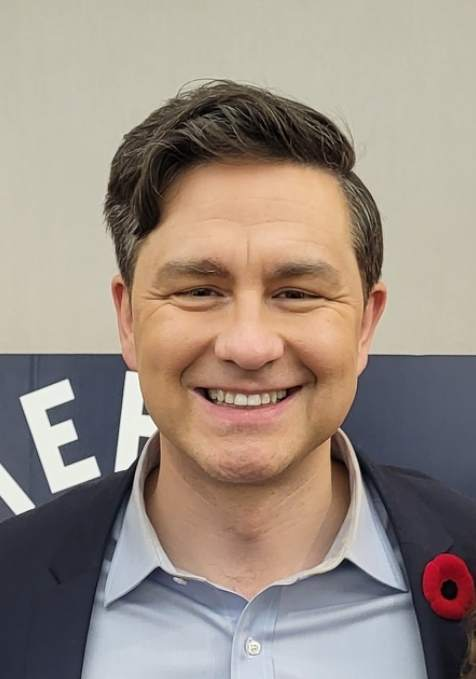
Pierre Poilievre, leader (2022–present)

Then-deputy leader of the Conservative Party Candice Bergen was elected interim leader the same day O'Toole was ousted, and a leadership election was subsequently scheduled for September 10, 2022. Conservative MP and former cabinet minister Pierre Poilievre, Conservative MP and former leadership candidate Leslyn Lewis, Independent (formerly Progressive Conservative) Member of Ontario Provincial Parliament Roman Baber, former leader of the now-defunct Progressive Conservative Party of Canada and former Premier of Quebec Jean Charest, former MP, former leader of the Progressive Conservative Party of Ontario, and Mayor of Brampton Patrick Brown, former Conservative MP Leona Alleslev, former BC MLA and Conservative MP Marc Dalton, and former Huntsville mayor and Conservative MP Scott Aitchison announced their candidacies for the leadership. On May 2, 2022, the Party announced that the six verified candidates for the leadership would be Aitchison, Baber, Brown, Charest, Lewis, Poilievre.

On July 6, 2022, the Party announced that Patrick Brown had been disqualified "due to 'serious allegations of wrongdoing' that 'appear' to violate Canadian election law." In response, Brown hired lawyer Marie Henein, who requested the Party's dispute resolution appeal committee be convened.

==== Pierre Poilievre (2022–present) ====
On September 10, 2022, Pierre Poilievre won the leadership on the first ballot in a landslide, winning over 68% of the points. On September 12, Poilievre gave his first speech to his caucus as leader. On April 28, 2025, the party would lose the 2025 Canadian federal election, despite making parliamentary gains through victories in places such as Ontario, such as the province's 905 area and southwestern region, and receiving over 40% of the popular vote for the first time in party history. The Conservatives also formed the largest Official Opposition in Canadian history. Poilievre however lost his own seat of Carleton to Liberal candidate Bruce Fanjoy, one of the few times a major party leader in Canada has been defeated in his own riding. There were also calls for Poilievre to resign as Conservative leader grew following the election result. Despite this, there was reportedly limited interest from the party's caucus in replacing him immediately after the election given their party's increase in the share of the vote, expansion of its political base in the Greater Toronto Area, and his own popularity with such across the country. Prominent Conservative Party MPs including Andrew Scheer, Shannon Stubbs, and former cabinet ministers Jason Kenney and James Moore also publicly supported his continued leadership after the election. Despite this, he was criticized by veteran and senior party members for his demeanour and campaign management that they cited as a reason for the party's loss of the election. Poilievre returned to Parliament in August 2025, following his victory in the Battle River—Crowfoot by-election. On November 5, 2025, MP Chris d'Entremont left the Conservative Party to join the Liberal Party of Canada, citing issues with Pierre Poilievre's leadership style and 'negative' approach to politics; this was followed by MP Michael Ma in December 2025, MP Matt Jeneroux in February 2026, and MP Marilyn Gladu in April 2026. At the party's convention in Calgary in January 2026, Poilievre received 87.4% support in a leadership review vote, vowing to remain as party leader.

== Principles and policies ==
As a relatively young party with a mixed political heritage and history, the federal Conservatives are often described as a "big tent" party in a similar manner to the federal Canadian Liberals by encompassing members and voters who hold a variety of philosophies, ideas and stances, albeit sitting within the centre-right to the right-wing of the political spectrum. Broadly, the party is defined as practicing the Canadian model of conservatism and fiscal conservatism. Some political observers have noted the two most dominant wings of the party traditionally represented Red Tory and Blue Tory ideologies, whereas others have argued that the party has become less internally defined by these labels and that the terms tend to be used by outsiders. Other smaller but visible factional beliefs espoused by individuals within the party have been described by media commentators as liberal conservative, social conservative, right-wing populist and libertarian conservative.

In an effort to create a cohesive platform following its creation, the Conservative Party declared its founding core philosophies and principles to be fiscal accountability, upholding individual rights and freedom, belief in constitutional monarchy, the institutions of Parliament and Canada's democratic process, support for strong national defence, law and order, and Canada's history and traditions, and equal treatment for all Canadians.

=== Party platform and policies ===
In recent years, the Conservative Party has repeatedly campaigned on the following policies:

==== Culture ====
- Bilingualism

==== Constitution ====
- Supporting Canadian federalism and opposing Quebec separatism
- Support for maintaining Canada's constitutional monarchy
- Electing Senators, rather than appointing them
- Freedom of speech, expression, religion, press and conscience
- Respecting treaties signed with Indigenous Canadians
- Allowing Indigenous Canadians more self-governance over their land

==== Economic policy ====
- Supply management for certain dairy, poultry and eggs
- Extracting petroleum and natural gas
- Construction of pipelines
- A belief in the right to own private property
- Right to work

==== Environmental regulation ====
- Subsidies and grants for carbon capture technology
- Prohibiting the dumping of raw sewage into rivers
- Marine Protected Areas
- Pollution caps for industries

==== Firearms ====
- Maintaining the licensing system for firearm owners
- Maintaining the prohibition of short-barreled handguns and fully automatic firearms, including assault rifles
- Opposing the prohibition of long-barreled handguns and semi-automatic firearms

==== Gender ====
- Equal opportunity for men and women

==== Foreign policy ====
- Support for most free trade agreements, including NAFTA, Canada–United Kingdom Free Trade Agreement, TPP and CETA
- CANZUK formation and membership
- Membership in NATO
- Membership in the United Nations
- Excluding abortion funding from foreign aid
- Support for Israel
- Recognizing Jerusalem as Israel's capital
- Prohibiting the Chinese government from owning Canada's 5G infrastructure

==== Healthcare and social programs ====
- Single-payer publicly funded healthcare
- Canada Pension Plan program
- Defunding the CBC public broadcaster

==== Immigration ====
- Linking immigration to housing and job supply
- Opposing illegal immigration

==== Law enforcement ====
- Mandatory minimum sentences for violent and sexual crimes
- Opposing the police abolition movement
- Creating a national sex offender registry
- Opposition to the legalization of recreational drugs

==== Life issues ====
- Opposing the expansion of assisted suicide to those solely suffering from mental illness
- Conscience rights for medical practitioners

==== Military ====
- Increasing military spending to 2% of Canada's GDP

==== Taxation and fiscal policy ====
- Income tax reductions
- Income splitting for families
- Business tax reductions
- Capital gains tax reductions
- Opposition to a carbon tax
- Tax simplification
- Balanced budget legislation
- Reducing the national debt
- Reducing grants and subsidies to businesses

=== Domestic policies ===
In its current platform, the Conservative Party states that its core objectives are to protect the lives and property of ordinary citizens, promote democratic accountability and reform the senate to make it a fully elected chamber. While the party platform states it is open to debate over electoral reform, it also claims it will not support changing the current electoral system.

The party calls for a "restoration of a constitutional balance between the federal and provincial and territorial governments" in regards to Canadian federalism. The Conservative Party also advocates offering tax incentives, increased business investment and more political autonomy to assist and integrate Indigenous Canadian communities over state affirmative action.

Historically, Conservative MPs were divided on the issue of same-sex marriage in Canada, with individuals in the party arguing for and against. During debates on Bill C-38 in 2004 which would redefine the legal definition of marriage in Canada, a majority of Conservative MPs voted against when then leader Stephen Harper allowed a free vote. Under Harper's premiership, the party proposed reopening the debate into same-sex marriage but following a defeat of the motion in the House of Commons stated it would not seek to reopen it.

In 2016, the Conservatives amended the party constitution to recognize and support same-sex marriage.

The Conservative leadership has supported changing the law to allow men who have sex with men to donate blood.

=== Economic and environmental policies ===
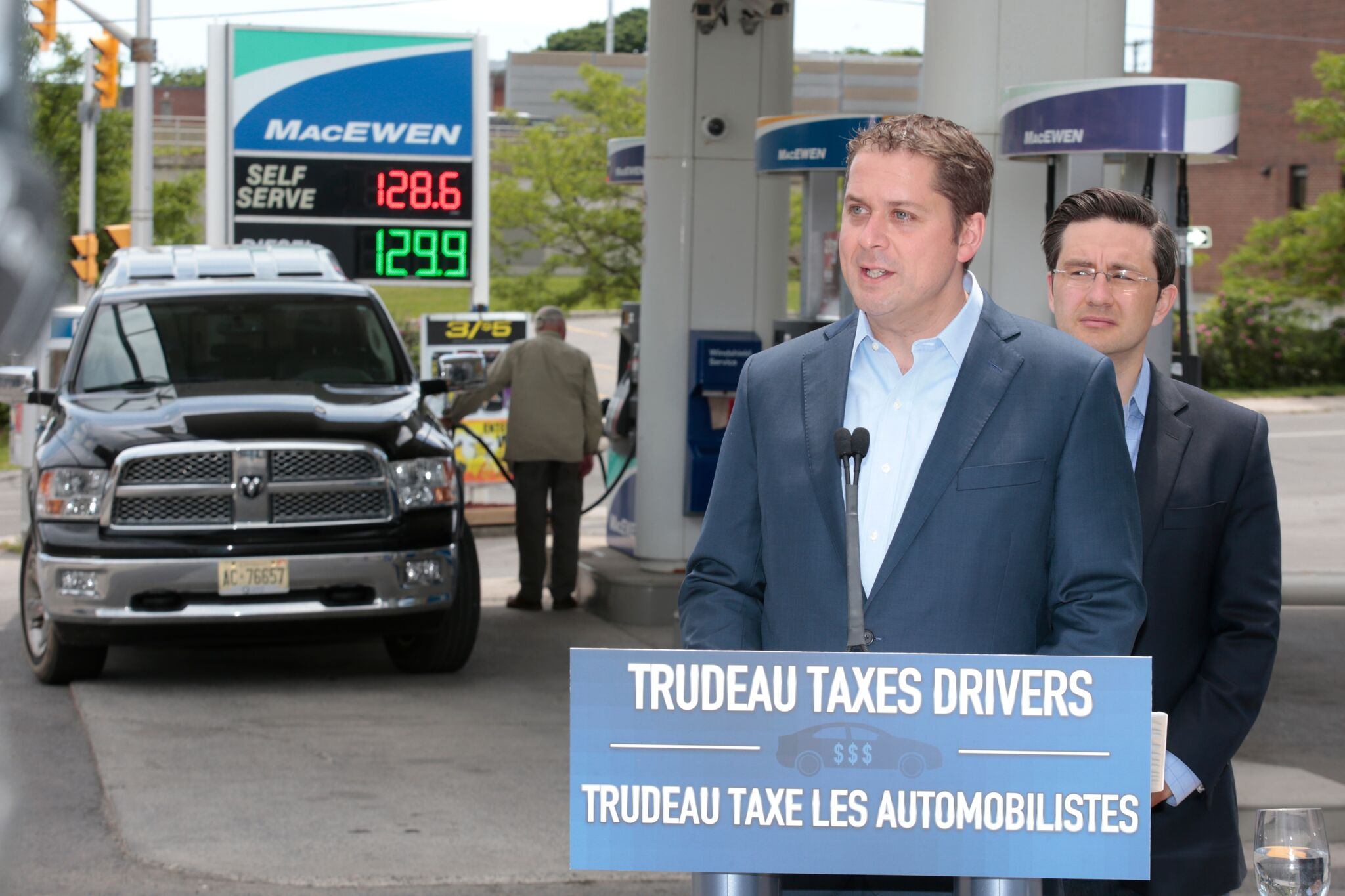
Andrew Scheer and Pierre Poilievre making a speech on abolishing the carbon tax and the increase of taxes on drivers

The party wants to keep the "Fiscal Balance" (which it introduced in its 2007 Budget while in government) in place and eliminate national debt. It also supports more simplified tax codes, controls on government spending and reductions in both personal and business taxes. Former party leader Erin O'Toole has listed economic recovery following the COVID-19 pandemic as a core priority for Canada. The party also supports abolishing the Carbon Tax.

At the party's March 2021 policy convention, delegates voted to reject a proposal to expand the party's existing climate change policies to include a statement that climate change is real.

=== Foreign policy ===
The Conservative Party presently supports Canada's involvement in NATO and international trade agreements, including a CANZUK agreement that would enable mobilization of goods, trade and people between Canada, Australia, New Zealand and the United Kingdom. The party is also supportive of Israel; Conservative leaders Andrew Scheer and Erin O'Toole have both expressed support for moving Canada's embassy to Jerusalem.

The party also supports taking a tough stance against the People's Republic of China and has pledged to prevent China from entering Canada's 5G Networks.

The party also calls on Canada to encourage other Western nations to prevent Chinese government backed corporations from accessing and taking control of important media, energy, internet, defence and security related infrastructure.

=== Canadian identity, social policies and immigration ===
The party supports maintaining the Official Languages Act ensuring that English and French have equality of status in Canada. It also calls for the protection of Canada's history, culture and heritage. It also supports the re-establishment of the Office of Religious Freedom. The Conservative Party constitution also supports maintaining the constitutional Monarchy of Canada.

The party has called for an immigration system that is "non-partisan, welcoming and well-managed" that encourages merit-based immigration and enticement of skilled workers to Canada to boost the economy while also taking a zero tolerance stance on illegal immigration and ensuring that immigrants speak English or French. The Conservatives also want to streamline the process of granting Canadian citizenship to foreign born children adopted by Canadian nationals, speed up the validation of refugee claims and give help to persecuted religious and sexual minorities while ensuring those who do not meet refugee status are escorted out of the country. Some MPs within the party have proposed a Canadian values test for prospective immigrants and long-term visitors, although this has not been adopted as a policy as a whole.

Following the 2019–20 Hong Kong protests, several members of the party including former leader Erin O'Toole called on the Canadian government to grant asylum to fleeing Hong Kong pro-democracy protesters facing extradition orders to China. The party also proposes eliminating birthright citizenship unless one of the parents of a child born in Canada has permanent residency or Canadian citizenship.

Incumbent Conservative leader Pierre Poilievre has vocally criticized the immigration policies of Justin Trudeau's Liberal government and supports significantly restricting numbers of temporary residents and asylum seekers coming into Canada.

The Conservative Party has promised to reduce the number of new permanent residents admitted to Canada to 250,000 per year, down from nearly 500,000 admitted to Canada in 2024. Poilievre instead argues that immigration intake should be linked to housing supply and that the Conservatives will introduce a cap on the number of foreign workers and further border control and background screening measures of immigrants.

The Conservatives also support a stricter policy on illegal immigration by amending the "Safe Third Country Agreement" and the reintroduction of visa requirements for Mexico.

=== Law and order ===
The Conservative Party generally supports a tough law and order stance. Presently, the party argues for a national register for convicted child sexual offenders, stricter sentences against repeat offenders, ending early release for violent felons and believes that victims of violent crime should have a say in National Parole Board decisions. The party also supports the creation of a cross-federal task force to tackle organized crime, human trafficking and threats to national security. Some Conservative MPs are in favour of the death penalty which is currently abolished in Canada.

=== Abortion ===
The Conservative Party has both members and MPs who favour abortion rights and members who oppose them. In the past, more Conservative members have been against abortion.

However, the party's policy book states that the party "will not support any legislation to regulate abortion" while in government, and the party's current leader, Pierre Poilievre, has stated that "no laws or rules will be passed that restrict women's reproductive choices" if he becomes prime minister.

=== Gun ownership ===
The party states that it supports responsible gun ownership and will "not deprive Canadian Citizens of legally owned firearms" but also calls for cost-effective gun control programs including screening all individuals wishing to purchase firearms and increased enforcement against arms trafficking.

== Regional conservative parties ==
The Conservative Party does not have any provincial wings. However, it often works closely with the former federal Progressive Conservative Party's provincial affiliates as well as other small "c" conservative and centre-right provincial parties, such as the Saskatchewan Party.

Cross-support between federal and provincial Conservatives is more tenuous in some other provinces. In Alberta, relations were sometimes strained between the federal Conservative Party and the provincial Progressive Conservative Party. The federal Tories' loss in the 2004 election was often blamed, in part, on then-Premier Ralph Klein's public musings on health care late in the campaign. Klein had also called for a referendum on same-sex marriage. With the impending 2006 election, Klein predicted another Liberal minority, though this time the federal Conservatives won a minority government. Klein's successor Ed Stelmach tried to avoid causing similar controversies; however, Harper's surprise pledge to restrict bitumen exports drew a sharp rebuke from the Albertan government, who warned such restrictions would violate both the Constitution of Canada and the North American Free Trade Agreement. The rise of the Wildrose Party caused a further rift between the federal Conservatives and the Albertan PCs, as some Conservative backbench MPs endorsed Wildrose. For the 2012 Alberta election, Prime Minister Harper remained neutral and instructed federal cabinet members to also remain neutral while allowing Conservative backbenchers to back whomever they chose if they wish. Wildrose candidates for the concurrent Senate nominee election announced they would sit in the Conservative caucus should they be appointed to the Senate.

After the 2007 budget was announced, the Progressive Conservative governments in Nova Scotia and Newfoundland and Labrador accused the federal Conservatives of breaching the terms of the Atlantic Accord.

As a result, relations worsened between the federal government and the two provincial governments, leading Newfoundland and Labrador Premier Danny Williams to denounce the federal Conservatives, which gave rise to his ABC (Anything But Conservative) campaign in the 2008 election.

== Composition ==
=== National Council ===
The National Council of the CPC is its "highest governing body". Christina Mitas, a former Ontario Progressive Conservative MPP, has served as President of the National Council since February 2026, when she was elected unanimously following the party's convention in Calgary. She succeeded Stephen Barber, who had held the position since 2023 and who in turn had succeeded Robert Batherson, president from 2021 to 2023.

The National Council has 21 seats, including four from Ontario, three from Quebec, two from British Columbia, two from Alberta, two from Saskatchewan, two from Manitoba, four from Atlantic Canada, and one from each of the three territories.

=== Geography ===
The Conservative Party has historically been strongest in the inland West as well as rural Ontario. The party is strongest particularly in the provinces of Alberta, Manitoba and Saskatchewan, where it holds 30 out of 34 and all 14 federal seats respectively. It tends to be weaker in Quebec and Atlantic Canada, particularly Newfoundland and Labrador and Prince Edward Island.

==== Youth wing ====
There is no official youth wing of the Conservative Party of Canada. There have been several attempts to create one, but all have failed. Despite this the party sets its minimum membership and voting age at 14. The party does however have several affiliated campus clubs at various universities.

== Party leadership ==
=== Leader ===
Leader		Term start	Term end	Constituency	Notes
Interim	John Lynch-Staunton (June 19, 1930 – August 17, 2012)	December 8, 2003	March 20, 2004	Senator for Grandville, Quebec	Interim leader, served concurrently as Senate Opposition Leader.
	Stephen Harper (b. April 30, 1959)	March 20, 2004	October 19, 2015	Calgary Southwest, Alberta	Served as Leader of the Official Opposition from 2004 to 2006, and Prime Minister from 2006 to 2015.
Interim	Rona Ambrose (b. March 15, 1969)	November 5, 2015	May 27, 2017	Sturgeon River—Parkland, Alberta	Interim leader, served concurrently as Leader of the Official Opposition.
	Andrew Scheer (b. May 20, 1979)	May 27, 2017	August 24, 2020	Regina—Qu'Appelle, Saskatchewan	Served concurrently as Leader of the Official Opposition.
	Erin O'Toole (b. January 22, 1973)	August 24, 2020	February 2, 2022	Durham, Ontario	Served concurrently as Leader of the Official Opposition.
Interim	Candice Bergen (b. September 28, 1964)	February 2, 2022	September 10, 2022	Portage—Lisgar, Manitoba	Interim leader, served concurrently as Leader of the Official Opposition.
	Pierre Poilievre (b. June 3, 1979)	September 10, 2022	Incumbent	Previously Carleton, Ontario. Currently Battle River—Crowfoot, Alberta.	Served concurrently as Leader of the Official Opposition until April 28, 2025, and again from August 18, 2025. Andrew Scheer served as parliamentary leader of the Conservative caucus and Leader of the Opposition from May 6, 2025, to August 18, 2025.

=== Deputy Leader ===
The Deputy Leader is appointed by the Leader.

Deputy Leader	Term start	Term end	Constituency	Appointed by	Notes
Peter MacKay	March 22, 2004	November 5, 2015	Central Nova, Nova Scotia	Stephen Harper	
Denis Lebel	November 18, 2015	July 21, 2017	Lac-Saint-Jean, Quebec	Rona Ambrose (2015–2017); Andrew Scheer (2017)	
Lisa Raitt	July 21, 2017	November 28, 2019	Milton, Ontario	Andrew Scheer	
Leona Alleslev	November 28, 2019	July 12, 2020	Aurora—Oak Ridges—Richmond Hill, Ontario	Andrew Scheer	
Candice Bergen	September 2, 2020	February 2, 2022	Portage—Lisgar, Manitoba	Erin O'Toole	
Luc Berthold	February 6, 2022	September 12, 2022	Mégantic—L'Érable, Quebec	Candice Bergen	
Melissa Lantsman	September 13, 2022	Incumbent	Thornhill, Ontario	Pierre Poilievre	Serving with Tim Uppal
Tim Uppal	September 13, 2022	Incumbent	Edmonton Mill Woods, Alberta	Pierre Poilievre	Serving with Melissa Lantsman

=== Party presidents ===
- Don Plett (2003–2009; interim until 2005)
- John Walsh (2009–2016)
- Scott Lamb (2016–2021)
- Robert Batherson (2021–2023)
- Stephen Barber (2023–2026)
- Christina Mitas (2026–present)

== Parliamentary caucus ==
=== Senate Caucus ===
The Conservative Party's senate caucus is the only political Senate Group that is formally linked to a federal political party. Unlike the Independent Senators Group, Canadian Senators Group and the Progressive Senate Group, which are unaffiliated with any party in the House of Commons, Conservative senators form part of the national Conservative parliamentary caucus made up of members of both houses of parliament, though the senators do meet separately to discuss Senate-specific issues.

The caucus was created following the establishment of the modern Conservative Party of Canada on February 2, 2004, as a result of the merger of the Canadian Alliance and the Progressive Conservative Party of Canada. All but three Progressive Conservative Senators joined the Conservative Party and were redesignated as Conservative senators.

When in government, the leader of the caucus has been appointed by the national Conservative Party leader, serving as Prime Minister of Canada. When in Opposition the leader is elected by Conservative senators. Most recently, Don Plett was elected Senate Conservative leader on November 5, 2019, defeating one other candidate.

The first leader of the senate caucus, John Lynch-Staunton, also served as interim leader of the Conservative Party of Canada until a leadership election could be held.

The Senate Conservative Caucus and the Conservative MPs in the House of Commons jointly constitute the national Conservative caucus. Nevertheless, Denise Batters was permitted to remain a member of the Senate Conservative Caucus despite being expelled from the national Conservative caucus on November 16, 2021, for publicly opposing the leadership of Erin O'Toole.

==== Conservative leaders in the Senate ====
Leader	Term start	Term end	Notes
John Lynch-Staunton	December 8, 2003	September 30, 2004	Also national leader until election of Stephen Harper on March 20, 2004; served concurrently as Leader of the Opposition in the Senate
Noël A. Kinsella	October 1, 2004	February 6, 2006	Leader of the Opposition in the Senate
Marjory LeBreton	February 6, 2006	July 14, 2013	Leader of the Government in the Senate; also served as Minister without portfolio until January 4, 2007, and Secretary of State for Seniors from January 4, 2007, until July 4, 2013.
Claude Carignan	August 20, 2013	March 21, 2017	Leader of the Government in the Senate until November 4, 2015, then became Leader of the Opposition in the Senate
Larry Smith	April 1, 2017	November 5, 2019	Leader of the Opposition in the Senate
Don Plett	November 5, 2019	May 14, 2025	Leader of the Opposition in the Senate
Leo Housakos	May 14, 2025	Incumbent	Leader of the Opposition in the Senate

== Election results ==
=== House of Commons ===
Election	Leader	Votes	%	Seats	+/–	Position	Status
2004	Stephen Harper	4,019,498	29.63	99 / 308	▲21 (Note: Compared to Canadian Alliance and Progressive Conservative parties combined.)	2nd	Opposition
2006	Stephen Harper	5,374,071	36.27	124 / 308	▲25	▲1st	Minority
2008	Stephen Harper	5,209,069	37.65	143 / 308	▲19	1st	Minority
2011	Stephen Harper	5,832,401	39.62	166 / 308	▲23	1st	Majority
2015	Stephen Harper	5,578,101	31.89	99 / 338	▼67	▼2nd	Opposition
2019	Andrew Scheer	6,239,227	34.34	121 / 338	▲22	2nd	Opposition
2021	Erin O'Toole	5,747,410	33.74	119 / 338	▼2	2nd	Opposition
2025	Pierre Poilievre	8,099,549	41.27	144 / 343	▲25	2nd	Opposition

View source data.

=== Alberta Senate nominee elections ===
Election	Votes	%	Elected
2021	977,473	46.6	3 / 3

== See also ==
- List of federal political parties in Canada
- Predecessor parties:
  - Conservative Party of Canada (1867–1942)
  - Progressive Conservative Party of Canada (1942–2003)
  - Reform Party of Canada (1987–2000)
  - Canadian Alliance (2000–2003)
