= John Holm =

Canadian politician

MLA for Sackville-Cobequid Sackville (1984-1993)
- In office 1984–2003
- Preceded by: Malcolm A. MacKay
- Succeeded by: Dave Wilson

Personal details
- Born: April 19, 1947 (age 79) Halifax, Nova Scotia, Canada
- Party: New Democratic Party

John Edgar Holm (born April 19, 1947) is a Canadian politician from Lower Sackville, Nova Scotia in the Halifax Regional Municipality. He represented the electoral districts of Sackville, and Sackville-Cobequid in the Nova Scotia House of Assembly from 1984 to 2003 as a member of the New Democratic Party.

== Political career ==
Holm entered provincial politics in the 1984 election, defeating Liberal Bill MacDonald and Progressive Conservative incumbent Malcolm A. MacKay in the Sackville riding. He was re-elected in the 1988 election. In the 1993 election, Holm ran in the new riding of Sackville-Cobequid, and was re-elected by almost 1,900 votes. Holm took over as interim leader of the NDP when Alexa McDonough resigned as leader in November 1994, and held the position until the election of Robert Chisholm as leader in March 1996. Holm was re-elected in the 1998 and 1999 elections. On January 15, 2003, Holm announced that he was not re-offering in the next election.
