= Marijuana Party of Nova Scotia =

- Former provincial party
- Founded: 2001
- Ideology: Cannabis legalisation

The Marijuana Party of Nova Scotia was a Canadian political organization based in Nova Scotia, Canada. The major aspect of the Marijuana Party platform was the legalization of marijuana in the province of Nova Scotia.

The party nominated Melanie Patriquen as a candidate in the 2001 by-election for the riding Halifax Fairview. Patriquen came in fourth place with 38 votes and 1.02% of the popular vote.

Prior to the 2003 provincial election, the party began to recruit candidates and revealed a platform. The party nominated 11 candidates in the province's 52 ridings, and won 1,608 votes, or 0.39% of the popular vote.
