= 41st General Assembly of Nova Scotia =

The 41st General Assembly of Nova Scotia represented Nova Scotia between March 1, 1938, and September 19, 1941.

== Division of seats ==
There were 30 members of the General Assembly, elected in the 1937 Nova Scotia general election.

Leader	Party	# of Seats
Angus L. Macdonald	Liberal	25
Gordon Sidney Harrington	Conservative	5
Total		30

== List of members ==
Riding	Name	Party	First elected / previously elected	Position
Annapolis County	John D. McKenzie	Liberal	1933	
Antigonish	John L. McIsaac	Liberal	1925	
Cape Breton South	George M. Morrison	Liberal	1937	
Cape Breton Centre	Michael Dwyer	Liberal	1933	Minister of Mines
Cape Breton Centre	Douglas MacDonald (1939)	CCF	1939	
Cape Breton North	George Belcher Murray	Liberal	1937	
Cape Breton East	Lauchlin D. Currie	Liberal	1933	Minister of Mines (1940)
Cape Breton West	Malcolm A. Patterson	Liberal	1937	
Colchester	Fred Murray Blois	Conservative	1937	
Colchester	George Yuill Thomas	Conservative	1933	
Colchester	George Scott Dickey (1940)	Conservative	1940	
Cumberland	Percy C. Black	Conservative	1925	
Cumberland	Archie B. Smith	Conservative	1937	
Cumberland	Leonard William Fraser (1940)	Conservative	1940	
Digby	J. Willie Comeau	Liberal	1907, 1920, 1928	
Guysborough	Havelock Torrey	Liberal	1937	
Halifax South	Angus L. Macdonald	Liberal	1933	Premier
Halifax South	Joseph Richard Murphy (1940)	Liberal	1940	
Halifax Centre	William Duff Forrest	Liberal	1937	
Halifax Centre	James Edward Rutledge (1939)	Liberal	1939	
Halifax North	Harold Connolly	Liberal	1936	
Halifax East	Geoffrey W. Stevens	Liberal	1933	
Halifax West	George E. Hagen	Liberal	1933	
Hants	Alexander S. MacMillan	Liberal	1928	Minister of Highways; Premier (1940)
Inverness	Moses E. McGarry	Liberal	1928	speaker (1939)
Inverness	Alexander H. McKinnon (1940)	Liberal	1940	
Kings	John A. McDonald	Liberal	1920, 1933	Minister of Agriculture
Lunenburg	Frank R. Davis	Liberal	1933	
Lunenburg	Gordon E. Romkey	Liberal	1928	speaker (1940)
Pictou	Josiah H. MacQuarrie	Liberal	1933	Attorney General
Pictou	Newton G. Munro	Liberal	1937	
Queens	John J. Cameron	Conservative	1937	
Richmond	Donald David Boyd	Liberal	1937	
Shelburne	Henry R. L. Bill	Liberal	1928	
Victoria	John M. Campbell	Liberal	1937	
Yarmouth	Lindsay C. Gardner	Liberal	1928	Speaker
Yarmouth	Henry A. Waterman (1938)	Liberal	1938	

== Former members of the 41st General Assembly ==
Name	Party	Electoral District	Cause of departure	Succeeded by	Elected
Lindsay C. Gardner	Liberal	Yarmouth	died	Henry A. Waterman, Liberal	1938
Michael Dwyer	Liberal	Cape Breton Centre	resigned	Douglas MacDonald, CCF	December 5, 1939
William Duff Forest	Liberal	Halifax Centre	died	James Edward Rutledge, Liberal	December 5, 1939
George Y. Thomas	Conservative	Colchester	died	George Scott Dickey, Conservative	October 28, 1940
Percy C. Black	Conservative	Cumberland	elected to federal seat	Leonard William Fraser, Conservative	October 28, 1940
Angus L. Macdonald	Liberal	Halifax South	named to federal cabinet	Joseph Richard Murphy, Liberal	October 28, 1940
Moses E. McGarry	Liberal	Inverness	elected to federal seat	Alexander H. McKinnon, Liberal	October 28, 1940

Preceded by 40th General Assembly of Nova Scotia	General Assemblies of Nova Scotia; 1937–1941	Succeeded by 42nd General Assembly of Nova Scotia
