= 40th General Assembly of Nova Scotia =

Legislature of Nova Scotia (1933–1937)

The 40th General Assembly of Nova Scotia represented Nova Scotia between August 22, 1933, to June 20, 1937.

== Division of seats ==
There were 30 members of the General Assembly, elected in the 1933 Nova Scotia general election.

Leader	Party	# of Seats
Angus L. Macdonald	Liberal	22
Gordon Sidney Harrington	Conservative	8
N/A	CCF/United Farmer/Labour	0
Total		30

== List of members ==
Riding	Name	Party	First elected / previously elected	Position
Annapolis	John D. McKenzie	Liberal	1933	
Antigonish	John L. McIsaac	Liberal	1925	
Cape Breton South	Gordon S. Harrington	Conservative	1925	
Cape Breton Centre	Michael Dwyer	Liberal	1933	Minister of Mines
Cape Breton North	Joseph Macdonald	Conservative	1925	
Cape Breton East	Lauchlin D. Currie	Liberal	1933	
Cape Breton West	Weldon W. Patton	Conservative	1933	
Colchester	William A. Flemming	Conservative	1928	
Colchester	George Y. Thomas	Conservative	1933	
Cumberland	Percy C. Black	Conservative	1925	
Cumberland	John S. Smiley	Liberal	1933	
Digby	J. Willie Comeau	Liberal	1907, 1920, 1928	
Guysborough	Clarence W. Anderson	Liberal	1920, 1928	
Halifax South	Angus L. Macdonald	Liberal	1933	Premier
Halifax Centre	Guy Murray Logan	Liberal	1933	
Halifax North	Gordon Benjamin Isnor	Liberal	1928	
Halifax North	Harold Connolly (1936)	Liberal	1936	
Halifax East	Geoffrey W. Stevens	Liberal	1933	
Halifax West	George E. Hagen	Liberal	1933	
Hants	Alexander S. MacMillan	Liberal	1928	Minister of Highways
Inverness	Moses E. McGarry	Liberal	1928	
Kings	John A. McDonald	Liberal	1920, 1933	Minister of Agriculture
Lunenburg	Frank R. Davis	Liberal	1933	
Lunenburg	Gordon E. Romkey	Liberal	1928	
Pictou	Donald F. Fraser	Liberal	1933	
Pictou	Josiah H. MacQuarrie	Liberal	1933	Attorney General
Queens	Seth M. Bartling	Conservative	1933	
Richmond	George R. Deveau	Liberal	1933	
Shelburne	Henry R. L. Bill	Liberal	1928	
Victoria	Frederick W. Baldwin	Conservative	1933	
Yarmouth	Lindsay C. Gardner	Liberal	1928	Speaker (1934)

== Former members of the 40th General Assembly ==
Name	Party	Electoral District	Cause of departure	Succeeded by	Elected
Gordon B. Isnor	Liberal	Halifax North	resigned to run federally	Harold Connolly, Lib.	March 2, 1936

Preceded by 39th General Assembly of Nova Scotia	General Assemblies of Nova Scotia; 1933–1937	Succeeded by 41st General Assembly of Nova Scotia
