= 1937 Nova Scotia general election =

Canadian provincial election

- June 20, 1937

30 seats of the Nova Scotia House of Assembly 16 seats needed for a majority
- Turnout: 79.67% ▼6.23pp
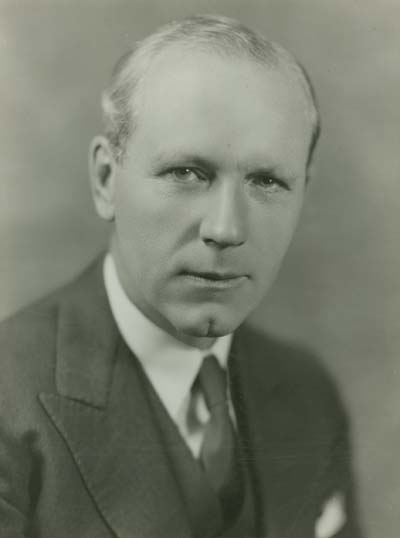

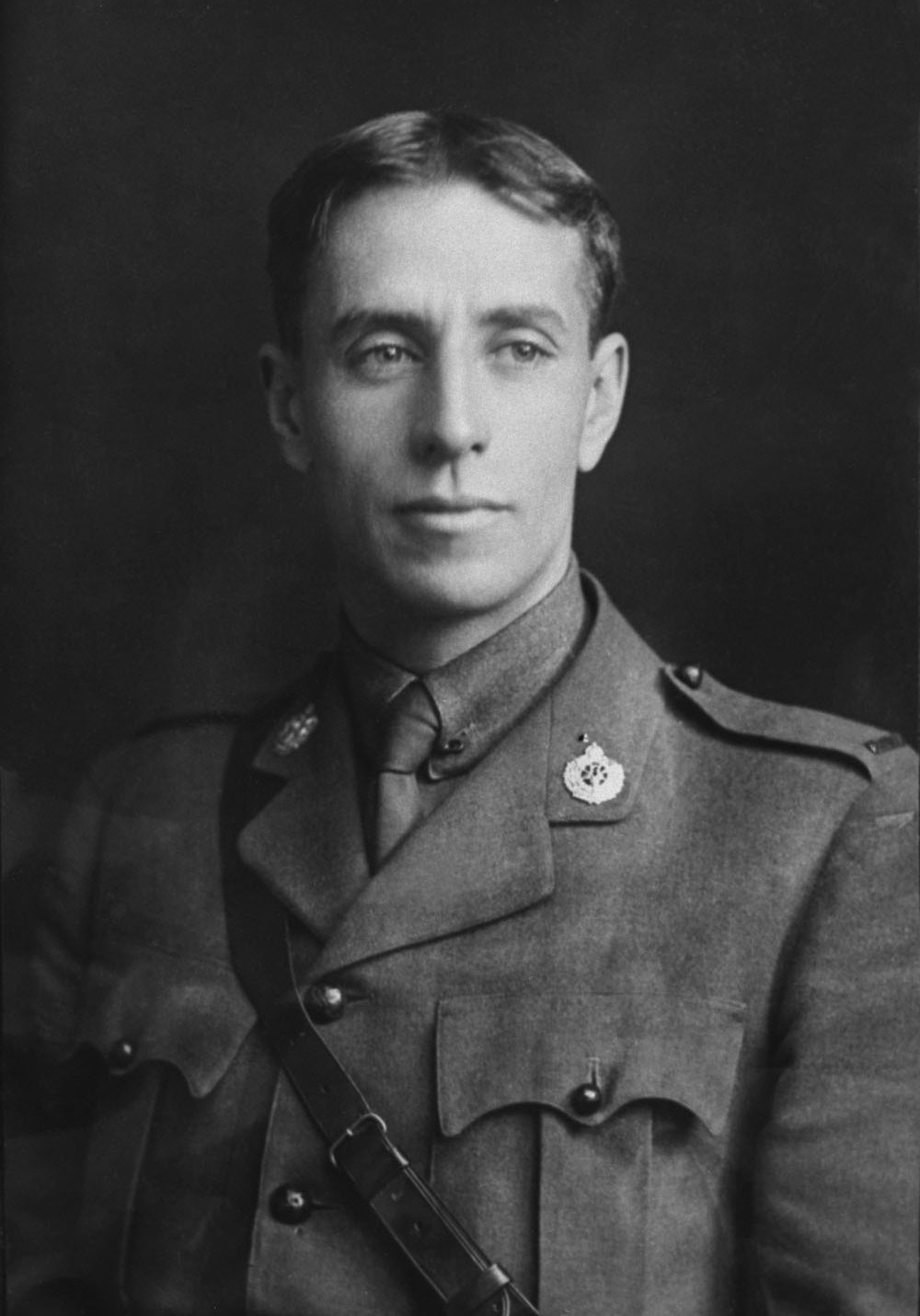
	First party	Second party
Leader	Angus Lewis Macdonald	Gordon Sidney Harrington
Party	Liberal	Progressive Conservative
Leader since	October 1, 1930	1930
Leader's seat	Halifax South	Cape Breton South (Lost re-election)
Last election	22	8
Seats won	25	5
Seat change	▲3	▼3
Popular vote	165,397	143,670
Percentage	52.69%	45.77%
Swing	▲0.35pp	▲0.06pp
Premier before election
Angus Lewis Macdonald
Liberal
Premier after election
Angus Lewis Macdonald
Liberal

The 1937 Nova Scotia general election was held on 20 June 1937 to elect members of the 41st House of Assembly of the province of Nova Scotia, Canada. It was won by the Liberal Party.

== Results ==
=== Results by party ===
↓
25	5
Liberal	Progressive Conservative

Official results
Party	Party leader	# of candidates	Seats				Popular vote		
Party	Party leader	# of candidates	1933	Dissolution	Elected	Change	#	%	Change (pp)
Liberal	Angus Lewis Macdonald	30	22	21	25	+3	165,397	52.69%	+0.35%
Progressive Conservative	Gordon Sidney Harrington	30	8	8	5	-3	143,670	45.77%	+0.06%
Labour		1	0	0	0	0	3,396	1.08%	+0.30%
Vacant				1					
Total valid votes							312,463	99.55%	–
Blank and invalid ballots							1,421	0.45%	–
Total		61	30	30	30	–	313,884	100.00%	–
Registered voters / turnout							312,817	79.67%	-6.23%

Popular vote
Liberal	52.69%
PC	45.77%
Labour	1.08%

Seats summary
Liberal	83.33%
PC	16.67%

== Retiring incumbents ==
Liberal

- Clarence W. Anderson, Guysborough
- George R. Deveau, Richmond
- Guy Murray Logan, Halifax Centre

Progressive Conservative

- Seth M. Bartling, Queens
- William A. Flemming, Colchester
- Weldon W. Patton, Cape Breton West

== Nominated candidates ==
Legend
bold denotes party leader
† denotes an incumbent who is not running for re-election or was defeated in nomination contest

=== Valley ===
Electoral district	Candidates			Incumbent
Electoral district	Liberal	PC	Labour	Incumbent
Annapolis	John D. McKenzie; 4,977; 57.35%	James Eugene Morse; 3,702; 42.65%		John D. McKenzie
Digby	Joseph William Comeau; 5,179; 58.19%	Edward Brenett Pugh; 3,721; 41.81%		Joseph William Comeau
Hants	Alexander Stirling MacMillan; 5,590; 54.96%	Leonard W. Fraser; 4,581; 45.04%		Alexander Stirling MacMillan
Kings	John Alexander McDonald; 7,470; 32.34%	George Nowlan; 5,790; 25.07%		John Alexander McDonald

=== South Shore ===
Electoral district	Candidates			Incumbent
Electoral district	Liberal	PC	Labour	Incumbent
Lunenburg	Frank R. Davis; 8,073; 28.28%	Reginald E. Hyson; 6,268; 21.95%		Frank R. Davis
Lunenburg	Gordon E. Romkey; 7,796; 27.31%	Vernon L. Pearson; 6,414; 22.47%		Gordon E. Romkey
Queens	J. Ross Byrne; 2,715; 48.09%	John J. Cameron; 2,931; 51.91%		Seth M. Bartling†
Shelburne	Henry R. L. Bill; 3,215; 58.41%	Norman Emmons Smith; 2,289; 41.59%		Henry R. L. Bill
Yarmouth	Lindsay C. Gardner; 5,566; 60.11%	Peter Lorimer Judge; 3,694; 39.89%		Lindsay C. Gardner

=== Fundy-Northeast ===
Electoral district	Candidates			Incumbent
Electoral district	Liberal	PC	Labour	Incumbent
Colchester	Harry B. Havey; 5,791; 23.45%	Frederick Murray Blois; 6,698; 27.13%		William A. Flemming†
Colchester	Edward G. McColough; 5,614; 22.74%	George Y. Thomas; 6,587; 26.68%		George Y. Thomas
Cumberland	John S. Smiley; 8,047; 22.58%	Archie B. Smith; 9,272; 26.02%		John S. Smiley
Cumberland	Archibald J. Mason; 8,024; 22.52%	Percy Chapman Black; 10,289; 28.88%		Percy Chapman Black

=== Halifax/Dartmouth/Eastern Shore ===
Electoral district	Candidates			Incumbent
Electoral district	Liberal	PC	Labour	Incumbent
Halifax Centre	William Duff Forrest; 5,186; 54.61%	Arthur Wilfred Morton; 4,310; 45.39%		Guy Murray Logan†
Halifax East	Geoffrey W. Stevens; 6,082; 52.27%	Josiah Frederick Fraser; 5,554; 47.73%		Geoffrey W. Stevens
Halifax North	Harold Connolly; 5,458; 57.81%	Gerald Patrick Flavin; 3,984; 42.19%		Harold Connolly
Halifax South	**Angus Lewis Macdonald**; 5,446; 56.10%	Richard Donahoe; 4,262; 43.90%		Angus Lewis Macdonald
Halifax West	George E. Hagen; 5,034; 54.00%	Earle C. Phinney; 4,288; 46.00%		George E. Hagen

=== Central Nova ===
Electoral district	Candidates			Incumbent
Electoral district	Liberal	PC	Labour	Incumbent
Antigonish	John L. MacIsaac; 3,160; 61.11%	Robert H. Butts; 2,011; 38.89%		John L. MacIsaac
Guysborough	Havelock Torrey; 4,368; 57.81%	Howard Amos Rice; 3,188; 42.19%		Clarence W. Anderson†
Pictou	Newton G. Munro; 9,637; 25.96%	John A. MacGregor; 8,890; 23.95%		Vacant
Pictou	Josiah H. MacQuarrie; 10,149; 27.34%	Rod H. MacLeod; 8,441; 22.74%		Josiah H. MacQuarrie

=== Cape Breton ===
Electoral district	Candidates			Incumbent
Electoral district	Liberal	PC	Labour	Incumbent
Cape Breton Centre	Michael Dwyer; 4,148; 59.56%	Robert Simpson MacLellan; 2,816; 40.44%		Michael Dwyer
Cape Breton East	Lauchlin Daniel Currie; 4,172; 40.12%	Roderick Kerr; 2,832; 27.23%	William T. Mercer; 3,396; 32.65%	Lauchlin Daniel Currie
Cape Breton North	George Belcher Murray; 4,679; 51.73%	Joseph Macdonald; 4,366; 48.27%		Joseph Macdonald
Cape Breton South	George M. Morrison; 5,879; 52.00%	**Gordon Sidney Harrington**; 5,427; 48.00%		Gordon Sidney Harrington
Cape Breton West	Malcolm A. Patterson; 2,883; 50.80%	Evan MacK. Forbes; 2,792; 49.20%		Weldon W. Patton†
Inverness	Moses Elijah McGarry; 5,836; 25.27%	Alexander Daniel McInnis; 4,002; 17.33%		Moses Elijah McGarry
Richmond	Donald David Boyd; 2,888; 53.38%	Benjamin Amedeé LeBlanc; 2,522; 46.62%		George R. Deveau†
Victoria	John Malcolm Campbell; 2,335; 57.17%	Frederick Walker Baldwin; 1,749; 42.83%		Frederick Walker Baldwin
