= List of Nova Scotia CCF/NDP members =

This is a list of articles about members of the Nova Scotia, Canada, branch of the Co-operative Commonwealth Federation (CCF), a social democratic political party, and its successor, the Nova Scotia New Democratic Party (NDP).

== Before the CCF ==
The Liberal and Conservative parties had a monopoly on Nova Scotia politics until the 1920 general election when the United Farmers and Independent Labour Party were able to elect 11 MLAs between them and form the official opposition with Daniel G. McKenzie as leader of the opposition. They were wiped out in the 1925 general election though 1 of the Labour MLAs was able to return to office in 1928. He did not run for re-election in 1933.

=== 1920 general election ===
- D. W. Morrison, ILP, Cape Breton - 1920-1925
- Arthur R. Richardson, Farmer-Labour, Cape Breton, 1920–1925
- Joseph Steele, ILP, Cape Breton, 1920–1925
- Arthur Forman Waye, ILP, Cape Breton, 1920–1925
- Archibald Terris, ILP, Cumberland, 1920–1925, 1928–1933
- Angus J. MacGillivray, UF, Antigonish, 1920–1925
- Robert H.Smith, UF, Colchester, 1920–1925
- Harry L. Taggart, UF, Colchester, 1920–1925
- Gilbert N. Allen, UF, Cumberland, 1920–1925
- Daniel G. McKenzie, UF, Cumberland, 1920–1925
- John A. MacDonald, UF, Hants, 1920–1925

== CCF ==
The CCF was formed in 1932.

=== 1933 general election ===
The CCF nominated candidates in the 1933 election, but won no seats.

=== 1937 general election ===
The CCF did not nominate candidates in this election.

=== 1939 by-election ===
The CCF won one seat in the 26-member Legislative Assembly of Nova Scotia.

- Douglas MacDonald - Cape Breton Centre 1939by-election; 1941-1945

=== 1941 general election ===
In the 1941 election, the CCF won two more seats, for three seats in the 26-member legislature.

- Donald MacDonald - Cape Breton South 1941-1945 (lost election, CCF lost)
- Douglas Neil Brodie - Cape Breton East 1941-1945 (Did not run, CCF won)

=== 1945 general election ===
In the 1945 election, the CCF won two of the 26 seats in the Legislature.

- Michael J. MacDonald - Cape Breton Centre 1945-1949-1953-1956-1960-1963 (ran, NDP lost)
- Russell Cunningham - Cape Breton East 1945-1949-1953-1956 (ran, CCF lost)

=== 1953 general election ===
In the 1953 election, the CCF won two of the 32 seats in the Legislature.

=== 1956 general election ===
In the 1956 election, the CCF won one of the 40 seats in the Legislature.

=== 1960 general election ===
In the 1960 election, the CCF won one of the 40 seats in the Legislature.

=== 1970 general election ===
In the 1970 election, the NDP won two of the 42 seats in the Legislature.

- Jeremy Akerman - Cape Breton East 1970-1974-1978-1980by (resigned due to government appointment, NDP lost subsequent by-election)
- Paul MacEwan - Cape Breton Nova 1970-1974-1978-1980 (left NDP in 1980, ran as independent in 1981)

=== 1974 general election ===
In the 1974 election, the NDP won an additional seat for three of the 43 seats in the Legislature.

- James Buddy McEachern - Cape Breton Centre 1974-1978-1981 (ran, NDP lost)

=== 1978 general election ===
In the 1978 election, the NDP won an additional seat for four of the 50 seats in the Legislature.

- Len Arsenault - Cape Breton North 1978-1981 (ran, NDP lost)

=== 1981 general election ===
In the 1981 election, the NDP won only one seat in the 52-member Legislature.

- Alexa McDonough - Halifax Chebucto 1981-1984-1988-1993, Halifax Fairview 1993-1996by (left to become federal NDP leader)

=== 1984 general election ===
In the 1984 election, the NDP won two additional seats for three of the 52 seats in the Legislature.

- Bob Levy - Kings South 1984-1988 (Government Appointment, NDP lost)
- John Holm - Sackville 1984-1988-1993, Sackville-Cobequid 1993-1998-1999-2003 (retired, NDP won)

=== 1988 general election ===
In the 1988 election, the NDP won two seats in the 52-seat the Legislature.

=== 1991 by-election ===
In a 1991 by-election, the NDP won an additional seat for three seats in the Legislature.

- Robert Chisholm - Halifax Atlantic 1991by-1993-1998-1999-2003 (retired, NDP won)

=== 1993 general election ===
In the 1993 election, the NDP won three seats in the 52-seat the Legislature.

=== 1996 by-election ===
In a 1996 by-election, the NDP kept the seat formerly held by federal leader Alexa McDonough.

- Eileen O'Connell - Halifax Fairview 1996by-1998-1999-2001by (Died, NDP won)

=== 1997 by-election ===
In a 1997 by-election, the NDP won an additional seat for four seats in the Legislature.

- Helen MacDonald - Cape Breton the Lakes 1997by-1998-1999 (ran, NDP lost)

=== 1998 general election ===
In the 1998 election, the NDP won an additional 15 seats for 19 of the 52 seats in the Legislature.

- Frank Corbett - Cape Breton Centre 1998-1999-2003-2006-2009–2013-2015 (resigned 2015, NDP lost)
- Reeves Matheson - Cape Breton East 1998-1999 (retired, NDP lost)
- Kevin Deveaux - Cole Harbour-Eastern Passage 1998-1999-2003-2006-(Left Politics in 2007, NDP won)
- Darrell Dexter - Dartmouth-Cole Harbour 1998-1999-2003, Cole Harbour 2003-2006-2009–2013 (ran 2013, NDP lost)
- Jerry Pye - Dartmouth North 1998-1999-2003-2006 (Left Politics, NDP won)
- Don Chard - Dartmouth South 1998-1999 (ran, NDP lost)
- Howard Epstein - Halifax Chebucto 1998-1999-2003-2006-2009–2013 (retired, NDP lost)
- Peter Delefes - Halifax Citadel 1998-1999 (ran, NDP lost)
- Maureen MacDonald - Halifax Needham 1998-1999-2003-2006–2009-2013-2016 (retired, NDP won)
- John MacDonell - Hants East 1998-1999-2003-2006–2009-2013 (ran, NDP lost)
- Charlie Parker - Pictou West 1998-1999 (ran, NDP lost), 2003-2006-2009–2013 (ran, NDP lost)
- Yvonne Atwell - Preston 1998-1999 (ran, NDP lost), 1st Black Woman elected to Nova Scotia Legislature
- Rosemary Godin - Sackville-Beaver Bank 1998-1999 (ran, NDP lost)
- Bill Estabrooks - Timberlea-Prospect 1998-1999-2003-2006–2009-2013 (retired, NDP lost)
- John Deveau - Yarmouth 1998-1999 (ran, NDP lost)

=== 1999 ===
In 1999, one Progressive Conservative member crossed the floor to the NDP.

- Hinrich Bitter-Suermann - Chester-St. Margaret's 1998-1998-1999* (Elected as a PC, switched to NDP over Budget, ran, NDP lost), former Nova Scotia NDP leadership candidate

=== 1999 general election ===
In the 1999 election, the NDP won eleven seats in the 52-seat Legislature, a loss of eight seats.

=== 2001 by-election ===
In a March 2001 by-election, the NDP won. It was held after NDP MLA Eileen O'Connell died in September 2000.

- Graham Steele - Halifax Fairview 2001by-2003-2006–2009-2013 (retired, NDP lost)

=== 2003 general election ===
In the 2003 election, the NDP won an additional three seats for 15 of the 52 seats in the Legislature.

- Gordie Gosse - Cape Breton Nova 2003-2006–2009-2013 Sydney-Whitney Pier 2013-2015 (retired for health reasons, NDP lost by-election)
- Joan Massey - Dartmouth East 2003-2006–2009 (ran, NDP lost)
- Marilyn More - Dartmouth South-Portland Valley 2003-2006–2009-2013 (retired, NDP lost)
- Michele Raymond - Halifax Atlantic 2003-2006–2009-2013 (retired, NDP lost)
- Dave Wilson - Sackville-Cobequid 2003-2006–2009-2013-2017-2018 (retired, NDP lost by-election)

=== 2006 general election ===
In the 2006 election, the NDP won an additional five seats for 20 of the 52 seats in the Legislature.

- Sterling Belliveau - Shelburne 2006–2009-2013 Queens-Shelburne 2013-2017 (retired, NDP lost)
- Vicki Conrad - Queens 2006–2009-2013 (retired, riding dissolved)
- Clarrie MacKinnon - Pictou East 2006–2009-2013 (ran, NDP lost)
- Percy Paris - Waverley-Fall River-Beaver Bank 2006–2009-2013 (ran, NDP lost)
- Leonard Preyra - Halifax Citadel 2006–2009-2013 (ran, NDP lost)
- Trevor Zinck - Dartmouth North 2006–2009-2010 (expelled from NDP 2010, resigned as MLA 2013, NDP lost)

=== 2008 provincial by-election ===
- Becky Kent - Cole Harbour-Eastern Passage 2008by-2009-2013 (ran, NDP lost)

=== 2009 general election ===
In the 2009 election, the NDP won an additional twelve seats, and lost one seat, for 31 of the 52 seats in the Legislature. NDP leader Darrell Dexter became Premier of Nova Scotia, leading Nova Scotia's first NDP government. 12 new NDP MLAs were elected:

- Pam Birdsall - Lunenburg 2009-2013 (ran, NDP lost)
- Jim Boudreau - Guysborough-Sheet Harbour 2009-2013 (ran, NDP lost)
- Gary Burrill NDP leader (2016-2022) - Colchester-Musquodoboit Valley 2009-2013 (ran, NDP lost) returned as MLA for Halifax Chebucto 2017-2021-2024
- Ramona Jennex - Kings South 2009-2013 (ran, NDP lost)
- Ross Landry - Pictou Centre 2009-2013 (ran, NDP lost)
- Jim Morton - Kings North 2009-2013 (ran, NDP lost)
- Denise Peterson-Rafuse - Chester-St. Margaret's 2009-2013-2017 (ran, NDP lost)
- Sid Prest - Eastern Shore 2009-2013 (ran, NDP lost)
- Gary Ramey - Lunenburg West 2009-2013 (ran, NDP lost)
- Brian Skabar - Cumberland North 2009-2013 (ran, NDP lost)
- Mat Whynott - Hammonds Plains-Upper Sackville 2009-2013 (ran, NDP lost)
- Lenore Zann - Truro-Bible Hill 2009-2013 Truro-Bible Hill-Millbrook-Salmon River 2013-2017-2019 (resigned to run federally as a Liberal, NDP lost)

The party also won a by-election in the fall of 2009.

- Maurice Smith - Antigonish 2009by-2013 (ran, NDP lost)

=== 2013 general election ===
In the 2009 election, the NDP lost 31 seats, electing 7 MLAs, resulting in the defeat of Dexter's NDP government and the party coming in third place in the legislature. No new NDP MLAs were elected.

=== 2015 by-election ===
- Marian Mancini - Dartmouth South 2015by-2017 (resigned, NDP won)

=== 2016 by-election ===
- Lisa Roberts - Halifax Needham 2016by-2017-2021 (resigned to run federally, NDP won)

=== 2017 general election ===
In the 2017 Nova Scotia general election, the NDP elected 7 MLAs. NDP leader Gary Burrill returned to the legislature, this time representing Halifax Chebucto. Three new NDP MLAs were elected:

- Susan Leblanc - Dartmouth North 2017-2021-present
- Claudia Chender - NDP leader (2022-present) - Dartmouth South 2017-2021-present
- Tammy Martin - Cape Breton Centre 2017-2020 (resigned 2020, NDP won)

=== 2020 by-election ===
- Kendra Coombes - Cape Breton Centre 2020by-2021-present

=== 2021 general election ===
In the 2021 Nova Scotia general election, the NDP elected 6 MLAs. Two new NDP MLAs were elected:

- Lisa Lachance - Halifax Citadel-Sable Island 2021-present
- Suzy Hansen - Halifax Needham 2021-present

=== 2024 general election ===
In the 2024 Nova Scotia general election, the NDP elected 9 MLAs. Four new NDP MLAs were elected:

- Lina Hamid - Fairview-Clayton Park 2024-present
- Rod Wilson - Halifax Armdale 2024-present
- Krista Gallagher - Halifax Chebucto 2024-present
- Paul Wozney - Sackville-Cobequid 2024-present

== Early CCF organizers ==
- Lloyd R. Shaw - provincial secretary until 1949
- Donald MacDonald - MLA and leader until 1945

== See also ==
- List of articles about CCF/NDP members
- List of articles about British Columbia CCF/NDP members
- List of articles about Alberta CCF/NDP members
- List of articles about Saskatchewan CCF/NDP members
- List of articles about Manitoba CCF/NDP members
- List of articles about Ontario CCF/NDP members
- List of articles about Yukon NDP members
