= 1980 Nova Scotia New Democratic Party leadership election =

- November 16, 1980
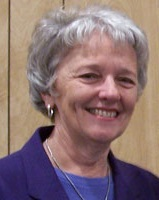
Candidate	Alexa McDonough	Len J. Arsenault	Buddy MacEachern
Final ballot	237 (74.06%)	42 (13.13%)	41 (12.81%)
Leader before election
Buddy MacEachern (interim)
Jeremy Akerman
Elected Leader
Alexa McDonough

1980 Nova Scotia New Democratic Party leadership election
- Date: November 16, 1980
- Resigning leader: Jeremy Akerman
- Won by: Alexa McDonough
- Ballots: 1
- Candidates: 3

The 1980 Nova Scotia New Democratic Party leadership election was held on November 16, 1980, to elect a successor to Jeremy Akerman as leader of the Nova Scotia New Democratic Party. The election was necessary because Akerman had announced had resigned that year to accept a senior position in the civil service. Alexa McDonough was elected, defeating Len J. Arsenault and Buddy MacEachern.

== Background ==
At the time of Akerman's resignation, the party was undergoing significant regional and ideological tensions. The party had never yet won any seats outside of Cape Breton Island, with all four of the party's MLAs representing various constituencies on the island. These Cape Breton New Democrats increasingly began to come into conflict with the more leftist elements of the party, largely based in Halifax. Tensions reached a peak when MLA Paul MacEwan was expelled from the party for publicizing internal party affairs and accusing other party members of being Trotskyites. These conflicts, and the decision about whether MacEwen would be readmitted to the party, were significant issues in the leadership election.

== Candidates ==
=== Len J. Arsenault ===
Len J. Arsenault was the MLA for Cape Breton North. He was first elected in the 1978 provincial election. Before entering politics, he was a teacher.

=== Buddy MacEachern ===
Buddy MacEachern was the MLA for Cape Breton Centre. He was first elected in the 1974 provincial election. Following Akerman's resignation, he was also serving as interim party leader. Before entering politics, he was a teacher.

=== Alexa McDonough ===
Alexa McDonough was the NDP candidate for Halifax in the 1979 and 1980 federal elections. Before entering politics, she was a social worker.

== Ballot results ==
First Ballot
Candidate	Votes	Percentage
Alexa McDonough	237	74.06
Len J. Arsenault	42	13.13
Buddy MacEachern	41	12.81
Total	320	100.00
