= 40th Nova Scotia general election =

The 40th Nova Scotia general election may refer to

- the 1933 Nova Scotia general election, the 39th overall general election for Nova Scotia, for the (due to a counting error in 1859) 40th General Assembly of Nova Scotia,
- the 1937 Nova Scotia general election, the 40th overall general election for Nova Scotia, for the 41st General Assembly of Nova Scotia, but considered the 18th general election for the Canadian province of Nova Scotia, or
- the 2017 Nova Scotia general election, the 62nd overall general election for Nova Scotia, for the 63rd Legislative Assembly of Nova Scotia, but considered the 40th general election for the Canadian province of Nova Scotia.
