= 41st Nova Scotia general election =

The 41st Nova Scotia general election may refer to

- the 1937 Nova Scotia general election, the 40th overall general election for Nova Scotia, for the (due to a counting error in 1859) 41st General Assembly of Nova Scotia, or
- the 1941 Nova Scotia general election, the 41st overall general election for Nova Scotia, for the 42nd General Assembly of Nova Scotia, but considered the 19th general election for the Canadian province of Nova Scotia.
- the 2021 Nova Scotia general election, the 63rd overall general election for Nova Scotia, for the 64th Legislative Assembly of Nova Scotia, but considered the 41st general election for the Canadian province of Nova Scotia.
