= Michael James MacDonald =

Canadian politician

Leader of the Nova Scotia Co-operative Commonwealth Federation
- In office 1953–1963
- Preceded by: Russell Cunningham
- Succeeded by: James H. Aitchison

Member of the Legislative Assembly
- In office October 23, 1945 – 1963
- Preceded by: Douglas MacDonald (CCF)
- Succeeded by: Mike Laffin (Progressive Conservative)
- Constituency: Cape Breton Centre

Personal details
- Born: August 8, 1909
- Died: July 3, 1997 (aged 87)
- Party: Co-operative Commonwealth Federation/New Democratic Party
- Occupation: Trade Unionist

Michael James MacDonald (August 8, 1909 – July 3, 1997) was a union leader, coal miner, volunteer firefighter and politician in Nova Scotia.

Born and raised in Cape Breton, the son of James MacDonald, MacDonald worked in the coal mines as a young man in order to support his family following the death of his father. He was involved with the United Mine Workers of America and was president of Local Union 4521 from 1938 until 1941 when he had to quit mining after being seriously injured in a stone fall. He then worked as a salesman for a bakery in Sydney, Nova Scotia, forming a union and becoming its president.

MacDonald was also involved in the co-operative movement, helping to find the Reserves Mines Credit Union and serving as its vice-president. He served as a member of the Reserve Mines Volunteer Fire Department for over 60 years having helped establish it in 1934.

In the 1945 provincial election, he was elected to the Nova Scotia House of Assembly representing the Nova Scotia Co-operative Commonwealth Federation for Cape Breton Centre. He and CCF leader Russell Cunningham were the only two Opposition members in the legislature until the 1949 provincial election. He would remain a member of the assembly for 18 years.

MacDonald served as leader of the CCF from 1953 to 1963, leading the party through the 1956 and 1960 provincial election. Despite the fact that the party received almost 9% of the vote in 1960, MacDonald was the only CCFer returned either time.

He stepped down as leader in 1963 and James H. Aitchison became leader of the newly formed Nova Scotia NDP. MacDonald lost his seat in the 1963 provincial election and the NDP would not gain another seat in the House of Assembly until 1970.

MacDonald also continued his union work as a business agent for the Retail, Wholesale and Department Store Workers from 1957 until his retirement in 1975 and was involved with the Cape Breton Labour Council and the Nova Scotia Federation of Labour. He also became active in municipal politics, serving on the Cape Breton County Council from 1974 to 1976.

== See also ==
- Co-operative Commonwealth Federation
- List of articles about Nova Scotia CCF/NDP members
