= Wayne Connors =

Canadian politician

MLA for Cape Breton Centre
- In office 1988–1989
- Preceded by: Mike Laffin
- Succeeded by: Russell MacNeil

Personal details
- Born: January 30, 1936 (age 90) New Waterford, Nova Scotia
- Party: Liberal

John Wayne "Buzzy" Connors (born January 30, 1936) is a Canadian politician. He represented the electoral district of Cape Breton Centre in the Nova Scotia House of Assembly from 1988 to 1989. He was a member of the Nova Scotia Liberal Party.

Born in 1936 at New Waterford, Nova Scotia, Connors is a graduate of St. Francis Xavier University. He served as a town councillor in New Waterford from 1982 to 1985. He entered provincial politics in the 1988 election, winning the Cape Breton Centre riding by 1,471 votes. He served as MLA until February 1989, when he resigned for health reasons.
