= Cape Breton Centre-Whitney Pier =

Provincial electoral district in Nova Scotia, Canada

Nova Scotia electoral district

Provincial electoral district
- Legislature: Nova Scotia House of Assembly
MLA
Kendra Coombes
New Democratic
- District created: 1925
- Last contested: 2024

Demographics
- Population (2011): 14,038
- Electors: 12,632
- Area (km²): 135.00
- Pop. density (per km²): 104
- Census division: Cape Breton
- Census subdivision: Cape Breton

Cape Breton Centre-Whitney Pier, formerly Cape Breton Centre is a provincial electoral district in Cape Breton, Nova Scotia, Canada, that elects one member of the Nova Scotia House of Assembly.

Its Member of the Legislative Assembly is Kendra Coombes. The district consists of the area around New Waterford, including Dominion, Grand Lake Road, Reserve Mines, Gardiner Mines, Lingan Road, Lingan, River Ryan, Scotchtown, New Victoria, Victoria Mines, South Bar.

It was created in 1925 when the counties of Cape Breton and Richmond were divided into three electoral districts. In 2003, it expanded west to include New Victoria. In 2013, it gained South Bar, Lingan Road, and part of Grand Lake Road from Cape Breton Nova.

It was renamed Cape Breton Centre-Whitney Pier for the 2021 Nova Scotia general election.

== Members of the Legislative Assembly ==
This riding has elected the following members of the Legislative Assembly:

=== Single-member district (1933–present) ===
Legislature	Years	Member	Party
Cape Breton Centre; Riding returned 2 seats before 1933
40th	1933–1937	Guy Murray Logan	Liberal
41st	1937–1939	Guy Murray Logan	Liberal
41st	1939–1941	Douglas MacDonald	Co-operative Commonwealth
42nd	1941–1945	Douglas MacDonald	Co-operative Commonwealth
43rd	1945–1949	Michael James MacDonald	Co-operative Commonwealth
44th	1949–1953	Michael James MacDonald	Co-operative Commonwealth
45th	1953–1956	Michael James MacDonald	Co-operative Commonwealth
46th	1956–1960	Michael James MacDonald	Co-operative Commonwealth
47th	1960–1961	Michael James MacDonald	Co-operative Commonwealth
47th	1961–1963	Michael James MacDonald	New Democratic
48th	1963–1967	Mike Laffin	Progressive Conservative
49th	1967–1970	Mike Laffin	Progressive Conservative
50th	1970–1974	Mike Laffin	Progressive Conservative
51st	1974–1978	James 'Buddy' MacEachern	New Democratic
52nd	1978–1981	James 'Buddy' MacEachern	New Democratic
53rd	1981–1984	Mike Laffin	Progressive Conservative
54th	1984–1988	Mike Laffin	Progressive Conservative
55th	1988–1989	Wayne Connors	Liberal
55th	1989–1993	Russell MacNeil	Liberal
56th	1993–1998	Russell MacNeil	Liberal
57th	1998–1999	Frank Corbett	New Democratic
58th	1999–2003	Frank Corbett	New Democratic
59th	2003–2006	Frank Corbett	New Democratic
60th	2006–2009	Frank Corbett	New Democratic
61st	2009–2013	Frank Corbett	New Democratic
62nd	2013–2015	Frank Corbett	New Democratic
62nd	2015–2017	David Wilton	Liberal
63rd	2017–2020	Tammy Martin	New Democratic
63rd	2020–2021	Kendra Coombes	New Democratic
Cape Breton Centre-Whitney Pier
64th	2021–present	Kendra Coombes	New Democratic

=== Dual-member district (1925–1933) ===
Legislature	Years	Member	Party	Member	Party
39th	1928–1933	Gordon Sidney Harrington	Liberal-Conservative	Joseph Macdonald	Liberal-Conservative
38th	1925–1928	Gordon Sidney Harrington	Liberal-Conservative	Joseph Macdonald	Liberal-Conservative
Cape Breton Centre returned two members before 1933

== Election results ==
=== 2024 ===
2024 Nova Scotia general election
Party	Candidate	Votes	%	±%
New Democratic	Kendra Coombes	3,212	48.60	+6.45
Progressive Conservative	Darren O'Quinn	2,676	40.49	+24.17
Liberal	Joleen Magilaro	721	10.91	-29.70
Total		6,609	–	
Total rejected ballots		41		
Turnout		6,651	45.00	
Eligible voters		14,781		
New Democratic hold		Swing		
Source: Elections Nova Scotia

=== 2021 ===
2021 Nova Scotia general election
Party	Candidate	Votes	%	±%	Expenditures
New Democratic	Kendra Coombes	3,309	42.15	-0.76	$42,384.15
Liberal	Michelle Wilson	3,188	40.61	+9.33	$42,089.66
Progressive Conservative	Bryden Mombourquette	1,281	16.32	-7.94	$29,698.56
Green	Robert Hussey	72	0.92	-0.27	$200.00
Total valid votes/expense limit		7,850	99.49	–	$85,411.87
Total rejected ballots		40	0.51		
Turnout		7,890	53.66		
Eligible voters		14,705			
New Democratic hold		Swing		-5.05	
Source: Elections Nova Scotia

=== 2020 ===
Nova Scotia provincial by-election, March 10, 2020 Resignation of Tammy Martin
Party	Candidate	Votes	%	±%	Expenditures
New Democratic	Kendra Coombes	2,731	42.91	-0.86	$37,311.64
Liberal	David Wilton	1,991	31.28	-2.30	$56,248.79
Progressive Conservative	Louie Piovesan	1,567	24.26	+1.96	$22,651.09
Green	Adrianna MacKinnon	76	1.19		$0.00
Total valid votes/Expense limit		6,365	99.76	+0.44	$73,449.93
Total rejected ballots		15	0.24	-0.44	
Turnout		6,380	51.56	-9.12	
Eligible voters		12,373			
New Democratic hold		Swing		+0.72	
Source(s) Source: Nova Scotia Legislature (2024). "Electoral History for Cape Breton Centre" (PDF). nslegislature.ca.

=== 2017 ===
2017 Nova Scotia general election: Cape Breton Centre
Party	Candidate	Votes	%	±%
New Democratic	Tammy Martin	3,419	43.77	+3.49
Liberal	David Wilton	2,623	33.58	-15.93
Progressive Conservative	Louie Piovesan	1,770	22.66	+12.44
Total valid votes		7,812	99.33	
Total rejected ballots		53	0.67	+0.06
Turnout		7,865	59.68	+12.01
Eligible voters		13,178		
New Democratic gain from Liberal		Swing		+9.71
Source: Elections Nova Scotia

=== 2015 ===
Nova Scotia provincial by-election, July 14, 2015: Cape Breton Centre On the resignation of Frank Corbett
Party	Candidate	Votes	%	±%
Liberal	David Wilton	3,120	49.51%	6.30%
New Democratic	Tammy Martin	2,538	40.27%	-16.51%
Progressive Conservative	Edna Gail Lee	644	10.22%	–
Total valid votes		6,302	99.38	
Total rejected ballots		39	0.62	+0.04
Turnout		6,341	47.67	-10.81
Electors on the lists		13,302	–	
Liberal gain from New Democratic		Swing		+5.66
Source(s) Source: Nova Scotia Legislature (2024). "Electoral History for Cape Breton Centre" (PDF). nslegislature.ca.

=== 2013 ===
2013 Nova Scotia general election: Cape Breton Centre
Party	Candidate	Votes	%	±%
New Democratic	Frank Corbett	3,440	45.29%	-34.85%
Liberal	David Wilton	3,282	43.21%	32.44%
New Democratic	Edna Lee	873	11.49%	-68.64%
Total valid votes		7,595	99.42	
Total rejected ballots		44	0.58	
Turnout		7,639	58.48	
Electors on the lists		13,062	–	
New Democratic hold		Swing		-31.98
Source(s) Source: Nova Scotia Legislature (2024). "Electoral History for Cape Breton Centre" (PDF). nslegislature.ca. Nova Scotia, Chief Electoral Officer (2013). 39th Provincial General Election, October 8, 2013: Volume 1 – Statement of Votes & Statistics (PDF) (Report). Elections Nova Scotia. Archived from the original (PDF) on April 10, 2018.

2009 Nova Scotia general election redistributed results
Party	Vote	%
New Democratic Party	5,738	78.54
Liberal	913	12.50
Progressive Conservative	537	7.35
Green	118	1.62

=== 2009 ===
2009 Nova Scotia general election: Cape Breton Centre
Party	Candidate	Votes	%	±%
New Democratic	Frank Corbett	5,096	80.14%	36.55%
Liberal	Joe MacPherson	685	10.77%	-16.19%
Progressive Conservative	Chris Ryan	479	7.53%	-20.93%
Green	Chris Alders	99	1.56%	0.57%
Total valid votes		6,359	99.48	
Total rejected ballots		33	0.52	+0.15
Turnout		6,392	51.90	-16.19
Electors on the lists		12,317	–	
New Democratic hold		Swing		+26.32
Source(s) Source: Nova Scotia Legislature (2024). "Electoral History for Cape Breton Centre" (PDF). nslegislature.ca.

=== 2006 ===
2006 Nova Scotia general election: Cape Breton Centre
Party	Candidate	Votes	%	±%
New Democratic	Frank Corbett	3,482	43.58%	-7.06%
Progressive Conservative	Darren Bruckschwaiger	2,274	28.46%	23.66%
Liberal	Laura Lee MacDonald	2,154	26.96%	-17.59%
Green	Frances Oommen	79	0.99%	–
Total valid votes		7,995	99.64	
Total rejected ballots		29	0.36	-0.02
Turnout		8,024	68.08	+0.47
Electors on the lists		11,786	–	
New Democratic hold		Swing		-15.31
Source(s) Source: Nova Scotia Legislature (2024). "Electoral History for Cape Breton Centre" (PDF). nslegislature.ca.

=== 2003 ===
2003 Nova Scotia general election: Cape Breton Centre
Party	Candidate	Votes	%	±%
New Democratic	Frank Corbett	3,929	50.64%	-3.44%
Liberal	Basil McGillivray	3,456	44.55%	4.60%
Progressive Conservative	Rita Tighe-Macleod	373	4.81%	-1.16%
Total		7,758	–	
Source(s) Source: Nova Scotia Legislature (2024). "Electoral History for Cape Breton Centre" (PDF). nslegislature.ca.

=== 1999 ===
1999 Nova Scotia general election: Cape Breton Centre
Party	Candidate	Votes	%	±%
New Democratic	Frank Corbett	4,042	54.09%	-10.53%
Liberal	Susan Deruelle Marsh	2,985	39.94%	11.33%
Progressive Conservative	John Morrissey	446	5.97%	-0.80%
Total		7,473	–	
Source(s) Source: Nova Scotia Legislature (2024). "Electoral History for Cape Breton Centre" (PDF). nslegislature.ca. Nova Scotia, Chief Electoral Officer (1999). Returns of the General Election for the House of Assembly, Thirty-Fifth General Election (Report). Elections Nova Scotia.

=== 1998 ===
1998 Nova Scotia general election: Cape Breton Centre
Party	Candidate	Votes	%	±%
New Democratic	Frank Corbett	5,499	64.62%	36.89%
Liberal	Steve Drake	2,435	28.61%	-32.67%
Progressive Conservative	Julien Frison	576	6.77%	-4.22%
Total		8,510	–	
Source(s) Source: Nova Scotia Legislature (2024). "Electoral History for Cape Breton Centre" (PDF). nslegislature.ca.

=== 1993 ===
1993 Nova Scotia general election: Cape Breton Centre
Party	Candidate	Votes	%	±%
Liberal	Russell MacNeil	5,644	61.28%	20.26%
New Democratic	Victor Tomiczek	2,554	27.73%	-3.52%
Progressive Conservative	Julien Frison	1,012	10.99%	-16.75%
Total		9,210	–	
Source(s) Source: Nova Scotia Legislature (2024). "Electoral History for Cape Breton Centre" (PDF). nslegislature.ca. Nova Scotia, Chief Electoral Officer (1993). Returns of the General Election for the House of Assembly, Thirty-Third General Election (PDF) (Report). Queen's Printer. Archived from the original (PDF) on June 18, 2018.

=== 1990 ===
Nova Scotia provincial by-election, 1990-08-28: Cape Breton Centre
Party	Candidate	Votes	%	±%
Liberal	Russell MacNeil	3,338	41.02%	5.47%
New Democratic	John Stevens	2,543	31.25%	2.31%
Progressive Conservative	Harold (Big) MacDonald	2,257	27.73%	-7.78%
Total		8,138	–	
Source(s) Source: Nova Scotia Legislature (2024). "Electoral History for Cape Breton Centre" (PDF). nslegislature.ca. "Return of By-Elections for the House of Assembly: 1989 and 1990" (PDF). Queen's Printer. 1991. Archived from the original (PDF) on October 6, 2014.

=== 1989 ===
Nova Scotia provincial by-election, 1989-08-22: Cape Breton Centre
Party	Candidate	Votes	%	±%
Liberal	Russell MacNeil	2,758	35.55%	-10.25%
Progressive Conservative	Harold (Big) MacDonald	2,755	35.51%	8.01%
New Democratic	John Stevens	2,245	28.94%	2.24%
Total		7,758	–	
Source(s) Source: Nova Scotia Legislature (2024). "Electoral History for Cape Breton Centre" (PDF). nslegislature.ca. "Return of By-Elections for the House of Assembly: 1989 and 1990" (PDF). Queen's Printer. 1991. Archived from the original (PDF) on October 6, 2014.

=== 1988 ===
1988 Nova Scotia general election: Cape Breton Centre
Party	Candidate	Votes	%	±%
Liberal	Wayne Connors	3,681	45.80%	29.59%
Progressive Conservative	Harold (Big) MacDonald	2,210	27.50%	-31.33%
New Democratic	John Wilson	2,146	26.70%	17.17%
Total		8,037	–	
Source(s) Source: Nova Scotia Legislature (2024). "Electoral History for Cape Breton Centre" (PDF). nslegislature.ca. Nova Scotia, Chief Electoral Officer (1988). Returns of the General Election for the House of Assembly, Thirty-Second General Election (PDF) (Report). Queen's Printer. Archived from the original (PDF) on July 7, 2018.

=== 1984 ===
1984 Nova Scotia general election: Cape Breton Centre
Party	Candidate	Votes	%	±%
Progressive Conservative	Mike Laffin	4,586	58.83%	19.34%
Liberal	A. (Beaver) Parsons	1,264	16.22%	-10.40%
Labour	Dan (Diddles) MacKinnon	1,202	15.42%	–
New Democratic	Angus Grant	743	9.53%	-24.36%
Total		7,795	–	
Source(s) Source: Nova Scotia Legislature (2024). "Electoral History for Cape Breton Centre" (PDF). nslegislature.ca. Nova Scotia, Chief Electoral Officer (1984). Returns of the General Election for the House of Assembly, Thirty-First General Election (PDF) (Report). Queen's Printer. Archived from the original (PDF) on July 31, 2017.

=== 1981 ===
1981 Nova Scotia general election: Cape Breton Centre
Party	Candidate	Votes	%	±%
Progressive Conservative	Mike Laffin	3,276	39.49%	20.84%
New Democratic	Buddy MacEachern	2,812	33.90%	-10.49%
Liberal	Art MacDonald	2,208	26.62%	-10.35%
Total		8,296	–	
Source(s) Source: Nova Scotia Legislature (2024). "Electoral History for Cape Breton Centre" (PDF). nslegislature.ca. Nova Scotia, Chief Electoral Officer (1981). Returns of the General Election for the House of Assembly, Thirtieth General Election (PDF) (Report). Queen's Printer. Archived from the original (PDF) on July 31, 2017.

=== 1978 ===
1978 Nova Scotia general election: Cape Breton Centre
Party	Candidate	Votes	%	±%
New Democratic	Buddy MacEachern	3,594	44.39%	1.20%
Liberal	Francis MacLean	2,993	36.96%	15.20%
Progressive Conservative	Peter MacKinnon	1,510	18.65%	-16.40%
Total		8,097	–	
Source(s) Source: Nova Scotia Legislature (2024). "Electoral History for Cape Breton Centre" (PDF). nslegislature.ca. Nova Scotia, Chief Electoral Officer (1978). Returns of the General Election for the House of Assembly, Twenty-Ninth General Election (PDF) (Report). Queen's Printer. Archived from the original (PDF) on June 18, 2018.

=== 1974 ===
1974 Nova Scotia general election: Cape Breton Centre
Party	Candidate	Votes	%	±%
New Democratic	Buddy MacEachern	3,380	43.19%	19.84%
Progressive Conservative	Mike Laffin	2,743	35.05%	-15.49%
Liberal	Albert J. Boudreau	1,703	21.76%	-4.36%
Total		7,826	–	
Source(s) Source: Nova Scotia Legislature (2024). "Electoral History for Cape Breton Centre" (PDF). nslegislature.ca. Nova Scotia, Chief Electoral Officer (1974). Returns of the General Election for the House of Assembly, Twenty-Eighth General Election (PDF) (Report). Queen's Printer. Archived from the original (PDF) on June 18, 2018.

=== 1970 ===
1970 Nova Scotia general election: Cape Breton Centre
Party	Candidate	Votes	%	±%
Progressive Conservative	Mike Laffin	3,680	50.54%	-5.32%
Liberal	Stewart Marsh	1,902	26.12%	5.55%
New Democratic	Alex McDonald	1,700	23.35%	-0.23%
Total		7,282	–	
Source(s) Source: Nova Scotia Legislature (2024). "Electoral History for Cape Breton Centre" (PDF). nslegislature.ca. Nova Scotia, Legislative Assembly (1970). Returns of the General Election for the House of Assembly, 1970 (PDF) (Report). Queen's Printer. Archived from the original (PDF) on July 25, 2018.

=== 1967 ===
1967 Nova Scotia general election: Cape Breton Centre
Party	Candidate	Votes	%	±%
Progressive Conservative	Mike Laffin	3,565	55.85%	1.73%
New Democratic	Tom O'Leary	1,505	23.58%	-8.57%
Liberal	William J. Boudreau	1,313	20.57%	6.83%
Total		6,383	–	
Source(s) Source: Nova Scotia Legislature (2024). "Electoral History for Cape Breton Centre" (PDF). nslegislature.ca. Nova Scotia Legislature (1967). Returns of the General Election for the House of Assembly (PDF) (Report). Queen's Printer. Archived from the original (PDF) on July 25, 2018.

=== 1963 ===
1963 Nova Scotia general election: Cape Breton Centre
Party	Candidate	Votes	%	±%
Progressive Conservative	Mike Laffin	3,699	54.12%	26.92%
New Democratic	Michael James MacDonald	2,197	32.14%	-14.54%
Liberal	Joseph Flaudio Rizzetto	939	13.74%	-12.39%
Total		6,835	–	
Source(s) Source: Nova Scotia Legislature (2024). "Electoral History for Cape Breton Centre" (PDF). nslegislature.ca. Nova Scotia Legislature (1963). Returns of the General Election for the House of Assembly (PDF) (Report). Queen's Printer. Archived from the original (PDF) on July 25, 2018.

=== 1960 ===
1960 Nova Scotia general election: Cape Breton Centre
Party	Candidate	Votes	%	±%
Co-operative Commonwealth	Michael James MacDonald	3,371	46.68%	3.36%
Progressive Conservative	Lowell Murray	1,964	27.19%	8.26%
Liberal	James P. McNeil	1,887	26.13%	-11.62%
Total		7,222	–	
Source(s) Source: Nova Scotia Legislature (2024). "Electoral History for Cape Breton Centre" (PDF). nslegislature.ca. Nova Scotia Legislature (1960). Returns of the General Election for the House of Assembly (PDF) (Report). Queen's Printer. Archived from the original (PDF) on July 25, 2018.

=== 1956 ===
1956 Nova Scotia general election: Cape Breton Centre
Party	Candidate	Votes	%	±%
Co-operative Commonwealth	Michael James MacDonald	2,948	43.31%	-5.21%
Liberal	James P. McNeil	2,569	37.75%	7.04%
Progressive Conservative	Charles P. Miller	1,289	18.94%	-1.83%
Total		6,806	–	
Source(s) Source: Nova Scotia Legislature (2024). "Electoral History for Cape Breton Centre" (PDF). nslegislature.ca. Nova Scotia Legislature (1956). Returns of the General Election for the House of Assembly (PDF) (Report). Queen's Printer. Archived from the original (PDF) on September 10, 2018.

=== 1953 ===
1953 Nova Scotia general election: Cape Breton Centre
Party	Candidate	Votes	%	±%
Co-operative Commonwealth	Michael James MacDonald	4,451	48.53%	7.52%
Liberal	Martin McPherson	2,816	30.70%	-9.47%
Progressive Conservative	Charles P. Miller	1,905	20.77%	1.95%
Total		9,172	–	
Source(s) Source: Nova Scotia Legislature (2024). "Electoral History for Cape Breton Centre" (PDF). nslegislature.ca. Nova Scotia Legislature (1953). Returns of the General Election for the House of Assembly (PDF) (Report). Queen's Printer. Archived from the original (PDF) on September 10, 2018.

=== 1949 ===
1949 Nova Scotia general election: Cape Breton Centre
Party	Candidate	Votes	%	±%
Co-operative Commonwealth	Michael James MacDonald	3,339	41.01%	-13.33%
Liberal	Ronald McIsaac	3,271	40.17%	1.80%
Progressive Conservative	Joseph A. MacDonald	1,532	18.82%	11.52%
Total		8,142	–	
Source(s) Source: Nova Scotia Legislature (2024). "Electoral History for Cape Breton Centre" (PDF). nslegislature.ca. Nova Scotia Legislature (1949). Returns of the General Election for the House of Assembly (PDF) (Report). Queen's Printer. Archived from the original (PDF) on September 10, 2018.

=== 1945 ===
1945 Nova Scotia general election: Cape Breton Centre
Party	Candidate	Votes	%	±%
Co-operative Commonwealth	Michael James MacDonald	3,860	54.34%	1.01%
Liberal	Ronald McIsaac	2,726	38.37%	7.41%
Progressive Conservative	Frank Doucette	518	7.29%	-8.43%
Total		7,104	–	
Source(s) Source: Nova Scotia Legislature (2024). "Electoral History for Cape Breton Centre" (PDF). nslegislature.ca. Nova Scotia Legislature (1945). Returns of the General Election for the House of Assembly (PDF) (Report). Queen's Printer. Archived from the original (PDF) on September 10, 2018.

=== 1941 ===
1941 Nova Scotia general election: Cape Breton Centre
Party	Candidate	Votes	%	±%
Co-operative Commonwealth	Douglas MacDonald	3,918	53.32%	8.30%
Liberal	Gus Brown	2,275	30.96%	-5.16%
Progressive Conservative	John Clifford Gregor	1,155	15.72%	–
Total		7,348	–	
Source(s) Source: Nova Scotia Legislature (2024). "Electoral History for Cape Breton Centre" (PDF). nslegislature.ca. Nova Scotia Legislature (1941). Returns of the General Election for the House of Assembly (PDF) (Report). Queen's Printer. Archived from the original (PDF) on February 8, 2024.

=== 1939 ===
Nova Scotia provincial by-election, 1939-12-05: Cape Breton Centre
Party	Candidate	Votes	%	±%
Co-operative Commonwealth	Douglas MacDonald	2,981	45.02%	–
Liberal	James L. MacKinnon	2,392	36.12%	-23.44%
Independent	Francis Stephenson	1,249	18.86%	–
Total		6,622	–	
Source(s) Source: Nova Scotia Legislature (2024). "Electoral History for Cape Breton Centre" (PDF). nslegislature.ca.

=== 1937 ===
1937 Nova Scotia general election: Cape Breton Centre
Party	Candidate	Votes	%	±%
Liberal	Michael Dwyer	4,148	59.56%	11.72%
Progressive Conservative	Robert Simpson MacLellan	2,816	40.44%	–
Total		6,964	–	
Source(s) Source: Nova Scotia Legislature (2024). "Electoral History for Cape Breton Centre" (PDF). nslegislature.ca. Nova Scotia Legislature (1937). Returns of the General Election for the House of Assembly (PDF) (Report). Queen's Printer. Archived from the original (PDF) on March 1, 2019.

=== 1933 ===
1933 Nova Scotia general election: Cape Breton Centre
Party	Candidate	Votes	%	±%
Liberal	Michael Dwyer	3,263	47.84%	5.38%
Liberal-Conservative	Neil R. McArthur	2,969	43.53%	-14.00%
Co-operative Commonwealth	Thomas Ling	588	8.62%	–
Total		6,820	–	
Source(s) Source: Nova Scotia Legislature (2024). "Electoral History for Cape Breton Centre" (PDF). nslegislature.ca. Nova Scotia Legislature (1933). Returns of the General Election for the House of Assembly (PDF) (Report). Queen's Printer. Archived from the original (PDF) on March 1, 2019.

=== 1928 ===
1928 Nova Scotia general election: Cape Breton Centre
Party	Candidate	Votes	%	Elected
Liberal-Conservative	Gordon Sidney Harrington	5,949	29.22%	✓
Liberal-Conservative	Joseph Macdonald	5,762	28.31%	✓
Liberal	Malcolm A. Patterson	4,384	21.54%	
Liberal	Luke Daye	4,261	20.93%	
Total		20,356	–	
Source(s) Source: Nova Scotia Legislature (2024). "Electoral History for Cape Breton Centre" (PDF). nslegislature.ca.

=== 1925 by-election ===
Nova Scotia provincial by-election, 1925-08-01: Cape Breton Centre
Party	Candidate	Votes	%	Elected
Liberal-Conservative	Gordon Sidney Harrington	Acclaimed	N/A	✓
Total			–	
Source(s) Source: Nova Scotia Legislature (2024). "Electoral History for Cape Breton Centre" (PDF). nslegislature.ca.

=== 1925 ===
1925 Nova Scotia general election: Cape Breton Centre
Party	Candidate	Votes	%	Elected
Liberal-Conservative	Gordon Sidney Harrington	7,621	34.13%	✓
Liberal-Conservative	Joseph Macdonald	7,611	34.09%	✓
Liberal	Daniel McDonald	3,277	14.68%	
Liberal	James McConnell	3,210	14.38%	
Labour	Joseph Steele	313	1.40%	
Labour	Emerson Campbell	295	1.32%	
Total		22,327	–	
Source(s) Source: Nova Scotia Legislature (2024). "Electoral History for Cape Breton Centre" (PDF). nslegislature.ca.

== See also ==
- List of Nova Scotia provincial electoral districts
- Canadian provincial electoral districts
