= Kendra Coombes =

Canadian politician

Deputy House Leader of the Nova Scotia New Democratic Party
- Incumbent
- Assumed office September 7, 2021
- Leader: Gary Burrill and Claudia Chender

Critic, Municipal Affairs; Labour; Gaelic Affairs; Community Services; Public Service Commission; and Youth
- Incumbent
- Assumed office September 7, 2021
- Leader: Gary Burrill and Claudia Chender

Member of the Nova Scotia House of Assembly for Cape Breton Centre-Whitney Pier
- Incumbent
- Assumed office March 10, 2020
- Preceded by: Tammy Martin

Personal details
- Born: October 25, 1988 (age 37) Sydney, Nova Scotia
- Party: New Democratic Party

Kendra Christine Coombes (born October 25, 1988) is a Canadian politician who was elected to the Nova Scotia House of Assembly in a by-election on March 10, 2020. She was re-elected in 2021 and 2024. A member of the Nova Scotia New Democratic Party, she represents the electoral district of Cape Breton Centre-Whitney Pier.

As of August 2025, she serves as the Official Opposition critic for Municipal Affairs and Public Works, the Office of Service Efficiency, and Military Relations. She is also the New Democrat Deputy House Leader.

Prior to her election to the Nova Scotia House of Assembly, she served on Cape Breton Regional Council, representing District 11 since the 2016 municipal elections.

== Electoral record ==
2024 Nova Scotia general election: Cape Breton Centre-Whitney Pier
| Party | Candidate | Votes | % | ±% |
|---|---|---|---|---|
| New Democratic | Kendra Coombes | 3,212 | 48.60 | +6.45 |
| Progressive Conservative | Darren O'Quinn | 2,676 | 40.49 | +24.17 |
| Liberal | Joleen Magilaro | 721 | 10.91 | -29.70 |
| Total | | 6,609 | – | |
| Total rejected ballots | | 41 | | |
| Turnout | | 6,651 | 45.00 | |
| Eligible voters | | 14,781 | | |
| New Democratic hold | | Swing | | |
Source: Elections Nova Scotia

2021 Nova Scotia general election: Cape Breton Centre-Whitney Pier
| Party | Candidate | Votes | % | ±% |
|---|---|---|---|---|
| New Democratic | Kendra Coombes | 3,309 | 42.15 | -0.76 |
| Liberal | Michelle Wilson | 3,188 | 40.61 | +9.33 |
| Progressive Conservative | Bryden Mombourquette | 1,281 | 16.32 | -7.94 |
| Green | Robert Hussey | 72 | 0.92 | -0.27 |
| Total valid votes | | 7,850 | 99.49 | |
| Total rejected ballots | | 40 | 0.51 | |
| Turnout | | 7,890 | 53.66 | |
| Eligible voters | | 14,705 | | |
| New Democratic hold | | Swing | | -5.05 |
Source: Elections Nova Scotia

Nova Scotia provincial by-election, March 10, 2020: Cape Breton Centre-Whitney Pier Upon the resignation of Tammy Martin
| Party | Candidate | Votes | % | ±% |
|---|---|---|---|---|
| New Democratic | Kendra Coombes | 2,731 | 42.91 | -0.86 |
| Liberal | David Wilton | 1,991 | 31.28 | -2.30 |
| Progressive Conservative | Louie Piovesan | 1,567 | 24.26 | +1.96 |
| Green | Adrianna MacKinnon | 76 | 1.19 | |
| Total valid votes | | 6,365 | 99.76 | |
| Total rejected ballots | | 15 | 0.24 | -0.44 |
| Turnout | | 6,380 | 51.56 | -9.12 |
| Eligible voters | | 12,373 | | |
| New Democratic hold | | Swing | | +0.72 |

| 2016 Cape Breton Regional Council Election: District 11 | Vote | % |
|---|---|---|
| Kendra Coombes | 2,106 | 55.38 |
| Lowell Cormier (X) | 1,697 | 44.62 |
