= Walter Harold Covert =

Canadian politician (1865–1949)

The Honourable Walter Harold Covert

16th Lieutenant Governor of Nova Scotia
- In office October 5, 1931 – April 7, 1937
- Monarchs: George V Edward VIII; George VI
- Governors General: The Earl of Bessborough; The Lord Tweedsmuir
- Premier: Gordon Sidney Harrington; Angus Lewis Macdonald
- Preceded by: Frank Stanfield
- Succeeded by: Robert Irwin

Personal details
- Born: September 13, 1865 Musquash, Nova Scotia
- Died: May 13, 1949 (aged 83) Dartmouth, Nova Scotia
- Party: Conservative Party
- Spouse: Mary Jane "Minnie" Covert (née McColough)
- Occupation: businessman and lawyer
- Profession: Politician

Walter Harold Covert (September 13, 1865 – May 13, 1949) was a corporate lawyer based in Nova Scotia, Canada. He was an influential member of the Conservative Party and served as the 16th Lieutenant Governor of Nova Scotia from 1931 to 1937.

As well as being head of a large Halifax law firm, Covert served as president of Nova Scotia Light and Power.

He was the uncle and father-in-law of Frank Manning Covert.
