= Russell MacNeil =

Canadian politician (1931–2018)

MLA for Cape Breton Centre
- In office 1989–1998
- Preceded by: Wayne Connors
- Succeeded by: Frank Corbett

Personal details
- Born: February 24, 1931 New Waterford, Nova Scotia, Canada
- Died: June 16, 2018 (aged 87) Dartmouth, Nova Scotia, Canada
- Party: Liberal

Russell Francis MacNeil (February 24, 1931 – June 16, 2018) was a Canadian politician. He represented the electoral district of Cape Breton Centre in the Nova Scotia House of Assembly from 1989 to 1998. He was a member of the Nova Scotia Liberal Party.

== Personal life and career ==
MacNeil was born to Michael ("Mickey") and Mary ("Molly") MacNeil on February 24, 1931 at New Waterford, Nova Scotia. He graduated from St. Francis Xavier University with an arts degree in 1953, and an education degree in 1954. During his time at University, he played varsity basketball and rugby. Following graduation, MacNeil was a physical education teacher in New Waterford, and later served as the recreation director for the province of Nova Scotia. He lived the majority of his life in New Waterford with his wife, Isabel, and their four children, before moving to Dartmouth, Nova Scotia in 2005. MacNeil died on June 16, 2018, in Dartmouth, Nova Scotia.

MacNeil's father was a coal miner as were many of Russell's friends. When a teenage MacNeil became jealous of the money his friends had acquired, he expressed to his father that he was tired of school and wanted to work. Early one morning, MacNeil's father woke him up to take him to a shift in the mine, not far into which Russell knew he no longer wanted to be a coal miner. His father told him to go home and do his homework, which set the course for his career in education and politics.

== Sports and recreation ==
When he was 15 years old, MacNeil played for the New Waterford Strands intermediate basketball team, where his teammates were all in their 20's or 30's. During an exhibition game against the St. Francis Xavier University varsity basketball team, he caught the eye of the University's recruiter, who requested that MacNeil's parents allowed him to attend St. Francis Xavier University, which they approved. Throughout his collegiate basketball career, MacNeil and St. Francis Xavier won five Maritime intercollegiate championships. MacNeil had a final basketball record of 69 wins and 7 losses throughout his five years at St. Francis Xavier University.

MacNeil was heavily involved in sports and recreation for Nova Scotia. He was a founding member of the New Waterford Coal Bowl Classic, an annual tournament that continues to be played today, organized the 1969-70 Caper Games, served as president of the Eastern Junior A/B Hockey League for 14 years, was the director of the 1987 Canada Winter Games in Cape Breton, and was named the recreation director of Nova Scotia.

MacNeil was inducted into the St. Francis Xavier University Sports Hall of Fame in 2001, the Cape Breton Sports Hall of Fame in 2010, and the New Waterford Sports Hall of Fame in 2013.

== Political career ==
MacNeil entered provincial politics in 1989, running as the Liberal candidate in a Cape Breton Centre by-election. Defeated by seven votes on election night, the number was reduced to two when official results were announced. However, a judicial recount in September ended with MacNeil being declared the winner by three votes. His Progressive Conservative opponent appealed to the Nova Scotia Supreme Court, and in February 1990, the by-election was declared invalid and MacNeil's victory voided. A second by-election was held on August 28, 1990, with MacNeil winning the seat. He was re-elected in the 1993 election, and served as a backbench member of John Savage's government. MacNeil did not seek re-election in 1998.
