= Halifax South =

Former provincial electoral district in Nova Scotia, Canada

Nova Scotia electoral district

Defunct provincial electoral district
- Legislature: Nova Scotia House of Assembly
- District created: 1933
- District abolished: 1967
- Last contested: 1963

Halifax South was a provincial electoral district in Nova Scotia, Canada, that elected one member of the Nova Scotia House of Assembly. It was formed in 1933 when Halifax County was divided into five distinct districts. It was renamed Halifax City South in 1966, and its boundaries were reformed in 1967 to create the district of Halifax Cornwallis.

== Members of the Legislative Assembly ==
Halifax South elected the following members to the Nova Scotia Legislature:

Halifax South
Legislature	Years	Member	Party
District formed from Halifax County (1867–1933)
40th	1933–1937	Angus Lewis Macdonald	Liberal
41st	1937–1940	Angus Lewis Macdonald	Liberal
41st	1940–1941	Joseph Richard Murphy	Liberal
42nd	1941–1945	Joseph Richard Murphy	Liberal
43rd	1945–1949	Angus Lewis Macdonald	Liberal
44th	1949–1953	Angus Lewis Macdonald	Liberal
45th	1953–1956	Angus Lewis Macdonald	Liberal
45th	1954–1956	Richard Alphonsus Donahoe	Progressive Conservative
46th	1956–1960	Richard Alphonsus Donahoe	Progressive Conservative
47th	1960–1963	Richard Alphonsus Donahoe	Progressive Conservative
48th	1963–1967	Richard Alphonsus Donahoe	Progressive Conservative
District dissolved into Halifax Cornwallis

== Election results ==
=== 1963 ===
1963 Nova Scotia general election
Party	Candidate	Votes	%	±%
Progressive Conservative	Richard Donahoe	5,986	63.23%	8.58%
Liberal	Merlin Nunn	3,183	33.62%	-6.49%
New Democratic	Gordon A. Smith	298	3.15%	–
Total		9,467	–	
Source(s) Source: Nova Scotia Legislature (2024). "Electoral History for Halifax South" (PDF). nslegislature.ca. Nova Scotia Legislature (1963). Returns of the General Election for the House of Assembly (PDF) (Report). Queen's Printer. Archived from the original (PDF) on 25 July 2018.

=== 1960 ===
1960 Nova Scotia general election
Party	Candidate	Votes	%	±%
Progressive Conservative	Richard Donahoe	5,861	54.65%	0.73%
Liberal	Robert James Butler	4,302	40.12%	-5.96%
Co-operative Commonwealth	Ralph Loomer	561	5.23%	–
Total		10,724	–	
Source(s) Source: Nova Scotia Legislature (2024). "Electoral History for Halifax South" (PDF). nslegislature.ca. Nova Scotia Legislature (1960). Returns of the General Election for the House of Assembly (PDF) (Report). Queen's Printer. Archived from the original (PDF) on 25 July 2018.

=== 1956 ===
1956 Nova Scotia general election
Party	Candidate	Votes	%	±%
Progressive Conservative	Richard Donahoe	6,051	53.92%	-2.25%
Liberal	Edward F. Cragg	5,171	46.08%	2.25%
Total		11,222	–	
Source(s) Source: Nova Scotia Legislature (2024). "Electoral History for Halifax South" (PDF). nslegislature.ca. Nova Scotia Legislature (1956). Returns of the General Election for the House of Assembly (PDF) (Report). Queen's Printer. Archived from the original (PDF) on 10 September 2018.

=== 1954 ===
Nova Scotia provincial by-election, 1954-11-16
Party	Candidate	Votes	%	±%
Progressive Conservative	Richard Donahoe	5,876	56.17%	15.85%
Liberal	Allan M. Murphy	4,585	43.83%	-15.85%
Total		10,461	–	
Source(s) Source: Nova Scotia Legislature (2024). "Electoral History for Halifax South" (PDF). nslegislature.ca.

=== 1953 ===
1953 Nova Scotia general election
Party	Candidate	Votes	%	±%
Liberal	Angus Lewis Macdonald	5,751	59.68%	0.11%
Progressive Conservative	John Milledge	3,885	40.32%	8.94%
Total		9,636	–	
Source(s) Source: Nova Scotia Legislature (2024). "Electoral History for Halifax South" (PDF). nslegislature.ca. Nova Scotia Legislature (1953). Returns of the General Election for the House of Assembly (PDF) (Report). Queen's Printer. Archived from the original (PDF) on 10 September 2018.

=== 1949 ===
1949 Nova Scotia general election
Party	Candidate	Votes	%	±%
Liberal	Angus Lewis Macdonald	6,097	59.57%	-1.69%
Progressive Conservative	John Milledge	3,212	31.38%	6.94%
Co-operative Commonwealth	Edward Coombs	926	9.05%	-3.72%
Total		10,235	–	
Source(s) Source: Nova Scotia Legislature (2024). "Electoral History for Halifax South" (PDF). nslegislature.ca. Nova Scotia Legislature (1949). Returns of the General Election for the House of Assembly (PDF) (Report). Queen's Printer. Archived from the original (PDF) on 10 September 2018.

=== 1945 ===
1945 Nova Scotia general election
Party	Candidate	Votes	%	±%
Liberal	Angus Lewis Macdonald	5,181	61.26%	2.51%
Progressive Conservative	Arthur John Haliburton	2,067	24.44%	-16.81%
Co-operative Commonwealth	Richard Leo Rooney	1,080	12.77%	–
Independent Co-operative Commonwealth	Andrew Mathews	129	1.53%	–
Total		8,457	–	
Source(s) Source: Nova Scotia Legislature (2024). "Electoral History for Halifax South" (PDF). nslegislature.ca. Nova Scotia Legislature (1945). Returns of the General Election for the House of Assembly (PDF) (Report). Queen's Printer. Archived from the original (PDF) on 10 September 2018.

=== 1941 ===
1941 Nova Scotia general election
Party	Candidate	Votes	%	±%
Liberal	Joseph Richard Murphy	4,381	58.75%	2.65%
Progressive Conservative	Arthur John Haliburton	3,076	41.25%	-2.65%
Total		7,457	–	
Source(s) Source: Nova Scotia Legislature (2024). "Electoral History for Halifax South" (PDF). nslegislature.ca. Nova Scotia Legislature (1941). Returns of the General Election for the House of Assembly (PDF) (Report). Queen's Printer. Archived from the original (PDF) on 8 February 2024.

=== 1940 ===
Nova Scotia provincial by-election, 1940-10-28
Party	Candidate	Votes	%	±%
Liberal	Joseph Richard Murphy	acclaimed	N/A	–
Total			–	
Source(s) Source: Nova Scotia Legislature (2024). "Electoral History for Halifax South" (PDF). nslegislature.ca.

=== 1937 ===
1937 Nova Scotia general election
Party	Candidate	Votes	%	±%
Liberal	Angus Lewis Macdonald	5,446	56.10%	2.75%
Progressive Conservative	Richard Donahoe	4,262	43.90%	–
Total		9,708	–	
Source(s) Source: Nova Scotia Legislature (2024). "Electoral History for Halifax South" (PDF). nslegislature.ca. Nova Scotia Legislature (1937). Returns of the General Election for the House of Assembly (PDF) (Report). Queen's Printer. Archived from the original (PDF) on 1 March 2019.

=== 1933 ===
1933 Nova Scotia general election
Party	Candidate	Votes	%	±%
Liberal	Angus Lewis Macdonald	4,945	53.34%	–
Liberal-Conservative	George Henry Murphy	4,325	46.66%	–
Total		9,270	–	
Source(s) Source: Nova Scotia Legislature (2024). "Electoral History for Halifax South" (PDF). nslegislature.ca. Nova Scotia Legislature (1933). Returns of the General Election for the House of Assembly (PDF) (Report). Queen's Printer. Archived from the original (PDF) on 1 March 2019.

== See also ==
- List of Nova Scotia provincial electoral districts
- Canadian provincial electoral districts
