= Frank Corbett =

Canadian politician

The Honourable Frank Corbett ECNS

Member of the Nova Scotia House of Assembly for Cape Breton Centre
- In office March 24, 1998 – April 2, 2015
- Preceded by: Russell MacNeil
- Succeeded by: David Wilton

Minister of the Public Service Commission
- In office June 19, 2009 – March 15, 2013
- Preceded by: Len Goucher
- Succeeded by: Marilyn More

Minister of Communications Nova Scotia
- In office June 19, 2009 – March 15, 2013
- Preceded by: Judy Streatch
- Succeeded by: Marilyn More

Personal details
- Born: 1954 (age 71–72) New Waterford, Nova Scotia
- Party: NDP

Francis "Frank" Corbett (born 1954) is a former Deputy Premier of Nova Scotia.

He represented the riding of Cape Breton Centre in the Nova Scotia House of Assembly from 1998 to 2015. He was a member of the Nova Scotia New Democratic Party.

== Early life and career ==
Corbett was born and raised in New Waterford and currently resides in Lingan. Corbett worked as a television cameraman for CJCB-TV, the CTV affiliate in Sydney and volunteered with the provincial NDP as well as the labour movement for over 25 years, primarily with the Communications, Energy, and Paperworkers Union. He served as official agent for Buddy MacEachern's successful elections in the 1974 and 1978 provincial elections.

== Political career ==
Corbett ran for the NDP nomination in the riding of Cape Breton Centre and was first elected in the 1998 provincial election. Corbett was subsequently re-elected in the 1999, 2003, 2006, 2009 and 2013 provincial elections.

Following the 2009 election, Corbett was appointed to the Executive Council of Nova Scotia as Deputy Premier, Minister of the Public Service Commission, and Minister of Communications Nova Scotia. In a March 2013 cabinet shuffle, Corbett was appointed Minister of Labour and Advanced Education, and Minister of Immigration. Along with his cabinet duties, Corbett also served as the Government House Leader.

On November 10, 2009, it was revealed that Corbett had the highest meal expense bills on file amongst cabinet members in the new NDP government. A check of ministers' records showed that Corbett expensed $441.48 for six people at the Keg restaurant in downtown Halifax on June 19, the night he and his 11 cabinet colleagues were sworn in. In July Corbett expensed $332.90 at CUT Steakhouse in Halifax for a dinner meeting for three people. Two nights later he expensed $250.28 at Ryan Duffy's in Halifax for three people.

These revelations came after a statement released in September 2009 in which Corbett stated that because of the province's projected $590-million deficit, MLAs and staff had to be prepared to "lead by example." When news of Corbett's meal expenses was made public, he was quoted as saying "I screwed up and it won't happen again".

On April 2, 2015, Corbett announced his resignation as MLA.

== Personal life ==
He is married to Joan and they have two children.
