= Mike Laffin =

Canadian politician and dentist (1918–2019)

The Honourable Mike Laffin ECNS
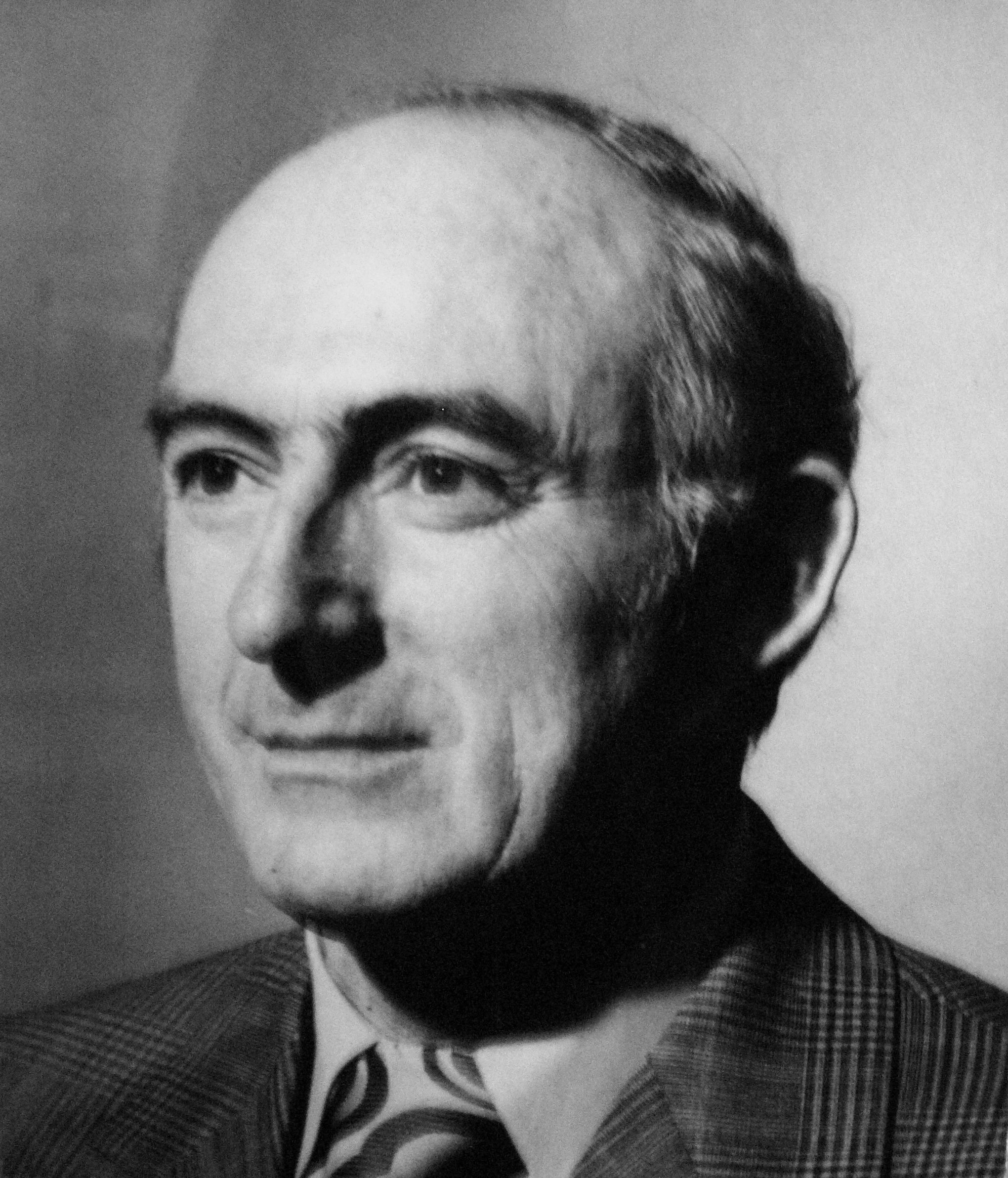
- Laffin, c. 1973

MLA for Cape Breton Centre
- In office 1963–1974
- Preceded by: Michael James MacDonald
- Succeeded by: James "Buddy" MacEachern
- In office 1981–1988
- Preceded by: James "Buddy" MacEachern
- Succeeded by: Wayne Connors

Personal details
- Born: Michael Alexander Laffin; January 12, 1918 New Waterford, Nova Scotia
- Died: May 23, 2019 (aged 101) Cape Breton Regional Hospital, Sydney, Nova Scotia
- Party: Progressive Conservative
- Occupation: Dentist

Michael Alexander Laffin (January 12, 1918 – May 23, 2019) was a Canadian politician and dentist. He represented the electoral district of Cape Breton Centre in the Nova Scotia House of Assembly from 1963 to 1974, and 1981 to 1988. He was a Progressive Conservative.

== Career ==
Laffin was first elected in the 1963 provincial election, defeating New Democrat House leader Michael James MacDonald. He was re-elected in the 1967 and 1970 elections. Laffin was defeated when he ran for re-election in 1974, losing his seat to New Democrat James "Buddy" MacEachern.

In the 1981 election, Laffin returned to politics and defeated MacEachern to regain the seat. Following the election, he was appointed to the Executive Council of Nova Scotia as Minister of Housing. Laffin was re-elected in 1984, and retained his cabinet seat until a cabinet shuffle in November 1985, when he was appointed Minister of Government Services.

On July 24, 1988, Laffin resigned from cabinet and announced that he would not seek re-election in the 1988 election. In August 2012, Laffin was interviewed about his experience as a prisoner of war during World War II.

== Personal life ==
Born in 1918 in New Waterford, Nova Scotia, Laffin was educated at St. Francis Xavier University and McGill University, and was a dentist by career. Laffin died in May 2019 at the age of 101.
