= Joseph Richard Murphy =

Canadian politician

Joseph R. Murphy

MLA for Halifax South
- In office October 28, 1940 – October 16, 1944
- Preceded by: Angus L. Macdonald
- Succeeded by: Angus L. Macdonald

Personal details
- Born: September 10, 1880 Halifax, Nova Scotia
- Died: October 16, 1944 (aged 64) Halifax, Nova Scotia
- Party: Nova Scotia Liberal Party

Joseph Richard Murphy (September 10, 1880 – October 16, 1944) was a Canadian politician. He represented the electoral district of Halifax South in the Nova Scotia House of Assembly from 1940 to 1944. He was a member of the Nova Scotia Liberal Party.

Murphy was born in 1880 at Halifax, Nova Scotia. He was educated at Ampleforth College, England. He married Marcelle Grace Butler in 1906, and was a wholesale dry goods and clothing manufacturer by career. Murphy entered provincial politics on October 28, 1940, winning a byelection for the Halifax South riding by acclamation. He was re-elected in the 1941 election. Murphy died in office on October 16, 1944.
