= Gordon Sidney Harrington =

Premier of Nova Scotia from 1930 to 1933

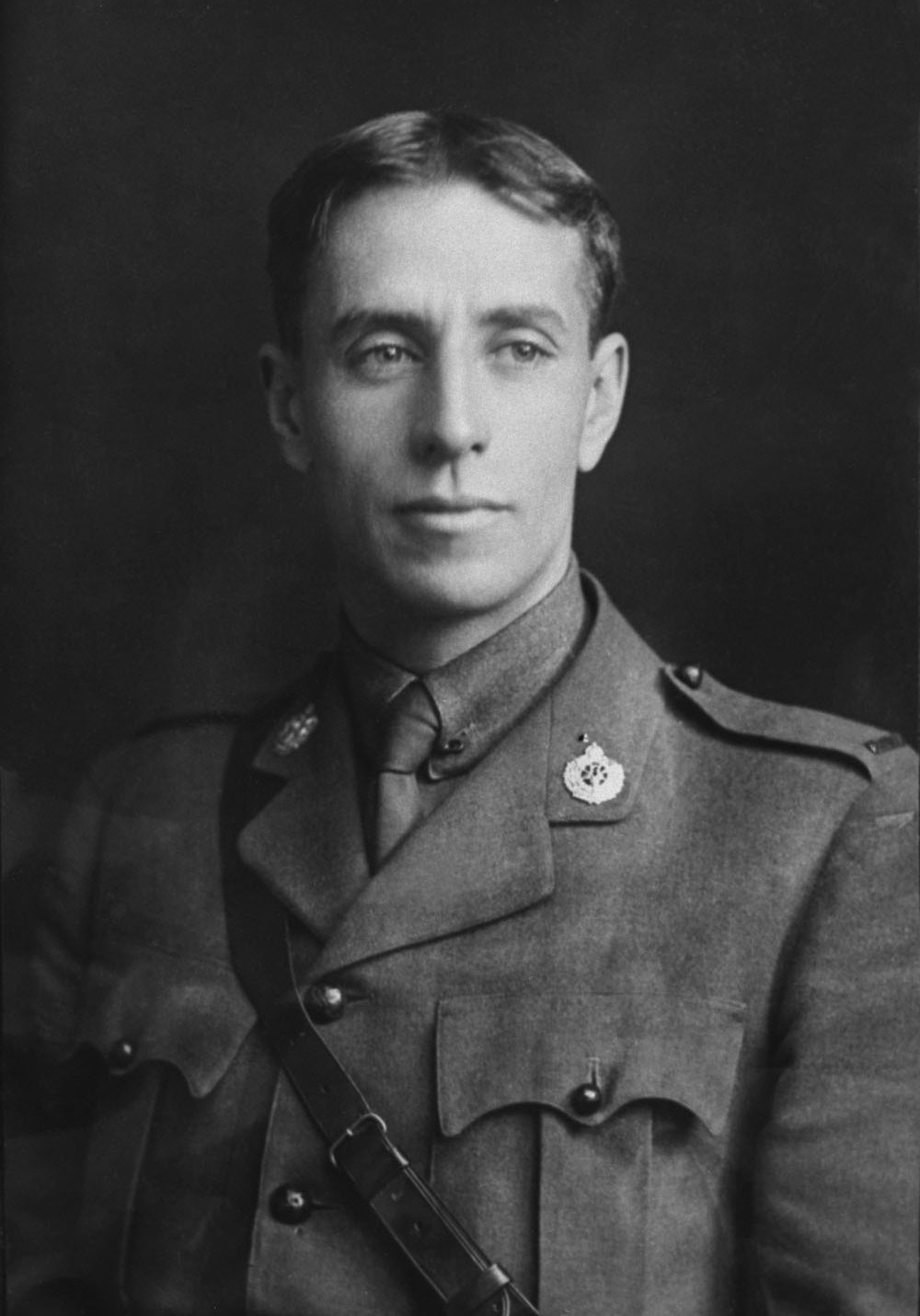
- Harrington in 1917

11th Premier of Nova Scotia
- In office August 11, 1930 – September 5, 1933
- Monarch: George V
- Lieutenant Governor: James Cranswick Tory; Frank Stanfield; Walter Harold Covert
- Preceded by: Edgar Nelson Rhodes
- Succeeded by: Angus Lewis Macdonald

MLA for Cape Breton Centre
- In office June 25, 1925 – August 22, 1933 Serving with Joseph Macdonald
- Preceded by: first member
- Succeeded by: Michael Dwyer

MLA for Cape Breton South
- In office August 22, 1933 – June 20, 1937
- Preceded by: first member
- Succeeded by: George M. Morrison

Personal details
- Born: August 7, 1883 Halifax, Nova Scotia
- Died: July 4, 1943 (aged 59) Halifax, Nova Scotia
- Party: Conservative
- Spouse: Katherine Agnes MacDonald
- Children: none
- Profession: lawyer

Gordon Sidney Harrington (August 7, 1883 – July 4, 1943) was a Nova Scotia politician and the 11th premier of Nova Scotia from 1930 to 1933.

He was mayor of Glace Bay from 1913 to 1915 when he enlisted in the Canadian Expeditionary Force fighting in World War I. He was elected a Conservative MLA in 1925 representing Cape Breton Centre and his support from miners helped ensure the Conservative Party's victory in that election. Harrington became Minister of Labour in the government of Edgar N. Rhodes and became Premier of Nova Scotia when Rhodes left provincial politics to enter the federal cabinet in 1930.

During Harrington's term he was able to end ongoing labour disturbance among miners in Cape Breton which had afflicted the previous two premiers. He improved the provincial department of mining, fought for the coal and steel industries in Ottawa, and passed legislation calling for a national policy on coal and steel.

However, his government was unable to combat the Great Depression and was defeated by the Liberals in the 1933 election. Harrington remained in the Nova Scotia House of Assembly until 1937. His government was the last Conservative government until Robert Stanfield was able to take power in 1956.

He is buried at Camp Hill Cemetery in Halifax.
