= Tammy Martin =

Canadian politician

Tammy Martin MLA

Member of the Nova Scotia House of Assembly for Cape Breton Centre
- In office May 30, 2017 – February 6, 2020
- Preceded by: David Wilton
- Succeeded by: Kendra Coombes

Personal details
- Born: North Sydney, NS
- Party: New Democratic Party
- Occupation: Hospital Administrator

Tammy Martin is a Canadian politician, who was elected to the Nova Scotia House of Assembly in the 2017 provincial election. A member of the Nova Scotia New Democratic Party, she represented the electoral district of Cape Breton Centre.

Before her election, Martin was employed by the Nova Scotia Health Authority and the Canadian Union of Public Employees. She resides in New Waterford, Nova Scotia.

Martin first attempted to enter provincial politics in a 2015 byelection, but was defeated by Liberal David Wilton. She ran again in the 2017 election, this time defeating Wilton.

In January 2020, Martin announced her resignation as MLA, effective February 6, 2020.
