= David Wilton =

Canadian politician

Member of the Nova Scotia House of Assembly for Cape Breton Centre
- In office July 14, 2015 – May 30, 2017
- Preceded by: Frank Corbett
- Succeeded by: Tammy Martin

Personal details
- Born: 1967/1968
- Party: Liberal

David Wilton (born 1967 or 1968) is a Canadian politician, who was elected to the Nova Scotia House of Assembly in a by-election on July 14, 2015. He represented the district of Cape Breton Centre as a member of the Nova Scotia Liberal Party.

He also ran for the Liberals in Cape Breton Centre in the 2013 election, losing to incumbent MLA Frank Corbett.

In the 2017 election, Wilton was defeated by NDP candidate Tammy Martin.

== Election results ==
Nova Scotia provincial by-election, July 14, 2015 On the resignation of Frank Corbett
Party	Candidate	Votes	%	±%
Liberal	David Wilton	3,060	49.02	+5.81
New Democratic	Tammy Martin	2,538	40.66	-4.63
Progressive Conservative	Edna Lee	644	10.32	-1.18
Total valid votes		6,242	99.43	
Total rejected ballots		36	0.57	
Turnout		6,278	47.20	
Electors on the lists		13,302	–	
Liberal gain from New Democratic		Swing		+5.22

2013 Nova Scotia general election
Party	Candidate	Votes	%	±%
New Democratic Party	Frank Corbett	3,440	45.29	-33.25
Liberal	David Wilton	3,282	43.21	+30.72
Progressive Conservative	Edna Lee	873	11.49	+4.14
Total valid votes		7,595	99.42	
Total rejected ballots		44	0.58	
Turnout		7,639	58.48	
Electors on the lists		13,062	–	
New Democratic hold		Swing		-31.98
