= Joseph Macdonald (Cape Breton politician) =

Canadian politician

Joseph Macdonald KC

MLA for Cape Breton North
- In office 1933–1937
- Preceded by: new riding
- Succeeded by: George Belcher Murray

MLA for Cape Breton Centre
- In office 1925–1933
- Preceded by: new riding
- Succeeded by: Michael Dwyer

Personal details
- Born: January 14, 1863 Sydney Mines, Nova Scotia
- Died: February 16, 1942 (aged 79) North Sydney, Nova Scotia
- Party: Conservative
- Occupation: lawyer

Joseph Macdonald KC (January 14, 1863 – February 16, 1942) was a lawyer, magistrate and political figure in Nova Scotia, Canada. He represented Cape Breton Centre from 1925 to 1933 and Cape Breton North from 1933 to 1937 as a Conservative member.

He was born in Sydney Mines, Nova Scotia, the son of Michael and Catherine Macdonald. He was educated at the University of Ottawa and Dalhousie University. In 1893, he married Teresa Mary MacDonald. Macdonald served as military censor during World War I. He was a member of the Executive Council of Nova Scotia from 1931 to 1933. He died in North Sydney at the age of 79.

His son John Michael Macdonald served in the Nova Scotia House of Assembly, 1956–1960 and the Senate of Canada, 1960–1997.
