= Guy Murray Logan =

Canadian politician

MLA for Halifax Centre
- In office 1933–1937
- Preceded by: new riding
- Succeeded by: William Duff Forrest

Personal details
- Born: February 21, 1899 Elmsdale, Nova Scotia
- Died: October 31, 1986 (aged 87) Halifax, Nova Scotia
- Party: Nova Scotia Liberal Party
- Occupation: dental surgeon

Guy Murray Logan (February 21, 1899 – October 31, 1986) was a Canadian politician. He represented the electoral district of Halifax Centre in the Nova Scotia House of Assembly from 1933 to 1937. He was a member of the Nova Scotia Liberal Party.

Logan was born in 1899 at Elmsdale, Hants County, Nova Scotia. He was educated at Dalhousie University, and was a dental surgeon by career. He married Laurie Anderson in 1928.

Logan was elected an alderman in Halifax on May 27, 1931. He entered provincial politics in the 1933 election, winning the Halifax Centre riding by 948 votes. Logan did not reoffer in the 1937 election. After serving in World War II, Logan returned to Halifax and was named Director of Dental Services for Nova Scotia, and chief of staff, Dentistry at Camp Hill Hospital, retiring on November 21, 1964. Logan died at Halifax on October 31, 1986.
