= Weldon W. Patton =

Canadian politician

MLA for Cape Breton West
- In office 1933–1937
- Preceded by: new riding
- Succeeded by: Malcolm A. Patterson

Personal details
- Born: September 1, 1881 Roslin, Nova Scotia
- Died: November 24, 1966 (aged 85) Port Morien, Nova Scotia
- Party: Conservative
- Occupation: physician

Weldon Wood Patton (September 1, 1881 – November 24, 1966) was a Canadian politician. He represented the electoral district of Cape Breton West in the Nova Scotia House of Assembly from 1933 to 1937. He was a member of the Conservative Party of Nova Scotia.

Patton was born in 1881 at Roslin, Cumberland County, Nova Scotia. He was educated at Dalhousie University, and was a physician by career. He practised in Newfoundland and several communities in Cape Breton, including Glace Bay, Broughton, Dominion, and Port Morien. He married Catherine MacLean. He entered provincial politics in the 1933 election, winning the new Cape Breton West riding by 396 votes. He did not reoffer in the 1937 election. Patton died at Port Morien on November 24, 1966.
