= Michael Dwyer (Canadian politician) =

Canadian politician (1877–1953)

MLA for Cape Breton Centre
- In office 1933–1939
- Preceded by: Gordon Sidney Harrington; Joseph Macdonald
- Succeeded by: Douglas MacDonald

Personal details
- Born: February 4, 1877; County Tipperary, Ireland
- Died: December 28, 1953 (aged 76); New Glasgow, Nova Scotia
- Political party: Liberal
- Occupation: mining executive

Michael Dwyer (February 4, 1877 – December 28, 1953) was a mining executive and political figure in Nova Scotia, Canada. He represented Cape Breton Centre in the Nova Scotia House of Assembly from 1933 to 1939 as a Liberal member.

Dwyer was born in Ireland in 1877, the son of Richard Dwyer and Bridget Doyle, and came to Canada in 1884. He was educated in New Glasgow, Nova Scotia. In 1907, he married Beatrice S. Campbell. Dwyer was mayor of Sydney Mines from 1926 to 1930. He ran unsuccessfully for a seat in the House of Commons in 1926 and 1930. Dwyer served as Minister of Mines and Public Works and Minister of Labour in the province's Executive Council from 1933 to 1938. He resigned his seat to become president and general manager of the Nova Scotia Steel and Coal Company. Dwyer served as Maritime Regional Superintendent for the National Selective Service (NSS) from 1942 to 1945. He was mayor of New Glasgow from 1949 to 1950. Dwyer died in New Glasgow, at the age of 76.
