= Angus L. Macdonald =

Premier of Nova Scotia from 1933 to 1940

The Honourable Angus L. Macdonald PC QC
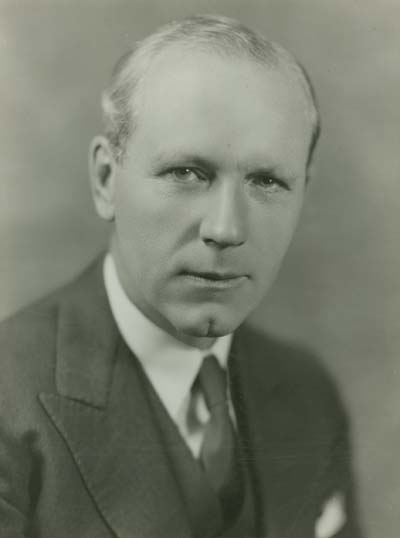
- Macdonald in the 1940s

12th and 14th Premier of Nova Scotia
- In office September 5, 1933 – July 10, 1940
- Monarchs: George V; Edward VIII; George VI
- Lieutenant Governor: Walter Harold Covert; Robert Irwin; Frederick F. Mathers
- Preceded by: Gordon S. Harrington
- Succeeded by: Alexander S. MacMillan
- In office September 8, 1945 – April 13, 1954
- Monarchs: George VI; Elizabeth II
- Lieutenant Governor: Henry Ernest Kendall; J.A.D. McCurdy; Alistair Fraser
- Preceded by: Alexander S. MacMillan
- Succeeded by: Harold Connolly

MLA for Halifax South
- In office August 22, 1933 – July 10, 1940
- Preceded by: District created
- Succeeded by: Joseph R. Murphy
- In office October 23, 1945 – April 13, 1954
- Preceded by: Joseph R. Murphy
- Succeeded by: Richard Donahoe

Member of the Canada Parliament for Kingston City
- In office August 12, 1940 – June 11, 1945
- Preceded by: Norman McLeod Rogers
- Succeeded by: Thomas Kidd

Personal details
- Born: Angus Lewis Macdonald; August 10, 1890 Dunvegan, Nova Scotia, Canada
- Died: April 13, 1954 (aged 63) Halifax, Nova Scotia, Canada
- Party: Liberal
- Spouse: Agnes Foley Macdonald
- Children: 4
- Education: St. Francis Xavier University

Military service
- Branch/service: Canadian Expeditionary Force
- Rank: Lieutenant

Angus Lewis Macdonald PC QC (August 10, 1890 – April 13, 1954) was a Canadian lawyer, law professor and politician from Nova Scotia. He served as the Liberal premier of Nova Scotia from 1933 to 1940, when he became the federal minister of defence for naval services. He oversaw the creation of an effective Canadian navy and Allied convoy service during World War II. After the war, he returned to Nova Scotia to become premier again. In the election of 1945, his Liberals returned to power while their main rivals, the Conservatives, failed to win a single seat. The Liberal rallying cry, "All's Well With Angus L.," was so effective that the Conservatives despaired of ever beating Macdonald. He died in office in 1954.

Macdonald's more than 15 years as premier brought fundamental changes. Under his leadership, the Nova Scotia government spent more than $100 million paving roads, building bridges, extending electrical transmission lines and improving public education. Macdonald dealt with the mass unemployment of the Great Depression by putting the jobless to work on highway projects. He felt direct government relief payments would weaken moral character, undermine self-respect and discourage personal initiative. However, he also faced the reality that the financially strapped Nova Scotia government could not afford to participate fully in federal relief programs that required matching contributions from the provinces.

Macdonald was considered one of his province's most eloquent political orators. He articulated a philosophy of provincial autonomy, arguing that poorer provinces needed a greater share of national tax revenues to pay for health, education and welfare. He contended that Nova Scotians were victims of a national policy that protected the industries of Ontario and Quebec with steep tariffs forcing people to pay higher prices for manufactured goods. It was no accident, Macdonald said, that Nova Scotia had gone from the richest province per capita before Canadian Confederation in 1867 to poorest by the 1930s.

Macdonald was a classical liberal in the 19th-century tradition of John Stuart Mill. He believed in individual freedom and responsibility and feared that the growth of government bureaucracy would threaten liberty. For him, the role of the state was to provide basic services. He supported public ownership of utilities like the Nova Scotia Power Commission, but rejected calls for more interventionist policies such as government ownership of key industries or big loans to private companies.

== Early life and education ==
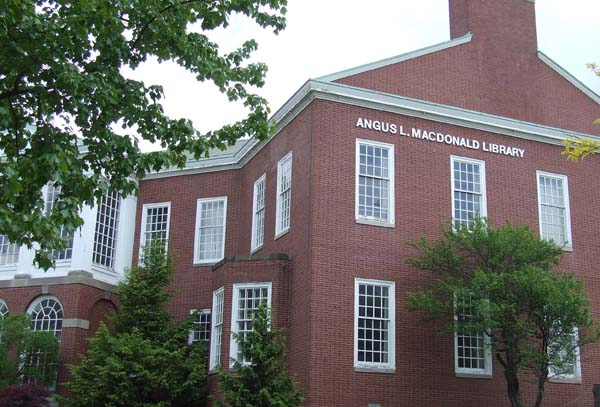
Macdonald had a lifelong relationship with his alma mater. This library at St. Francis Xavier University is named after him.

Angus Lewis Macdonald was born August 10, 1890, on a small family farm at Dunvegan, Inverness County, on Cape Breton Island. He was the son of Lewis Macdonald and Veronique "Veronica" Perry, and the ninth child in a family of 14. His mother was from a prominent Acadian family on Prince Edward Island and his maternal grandfather was politician Stanislaus Francis Perry. His father's family had emigrated to Cape Breton from the Scottish Highlands in 1810. The Macdonalds were devout Roman Catholics as well as ardent Liberal Party supporters.

In 1905, when Macdonald was 15, the family moved to the town of Port Hood, Cape Breton. Macdonald attended the Port Hood Academy. He hoped to enroll next in the Bachelor of Arts program at St Francis Xavier University in Antigonish, but his family couldn't afford to pay for a university education so Macdonald obtained a teaching licence and taught for two years to finance his education. Midway through his university studies, he took another year off to earn money teaching. He completed his final term on credit and was required to teach in the university's high school during 1914–15 to pay off his debt. Macdonald did well at St. FX. He played rugby, joined the debating team, edited the student newspaper and, in his graduating year, won the gold medal in seven of his eight courses. He was also class valedictorian.

== War service ==
The First World War broke out while Macdonald was earning his university degree. In 1915, he underwent military training in the Canadian Officers Training Corps. In February 1916, he joined the 185th battalion, known as the Cape Breton Highlanders, leaving for Britain in October 1916 where he received further training. Macdonald was finally sent to the front lines in France in May 1918 as a lieutenant in Nova Scotia's 25th battalion. He participated in heavy fighting and on one occasion led his entire company because all of the other officers had been wounded or killed. Macdonald felt fortunate to have been spared, but his luck ran out in Belgium when he was hit in the neck by a German sniper's bullet on November 7, 1918, just four days before the Armistice. Macdonald spent eight months in Britain recovering from his wound. He returned home to his family in Cape Breton in 1919. Biographer Stephen Henderson writes that the war had made him "more serious and less self-confident", but "struck by the willingness of so many to march to horrible deaths in the name of an abstract principle".

== Life before politics ==
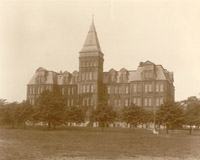
The Forrest Building housed the Dalhousie Law School where Macdonald studied and later taught.

In September 1919, the 29-year-old Macdonald began studying at Dalhousie Law School in Halifax. During his two years there, Macdonald formed lifelong friendships with students who were to become members of the political elite in the region. Once again, he excelled in athletics, was elected to the Dalhousie students' council, became the associate editor of the student newspaper and led the opposition in the law school's Mock Parliament. He scored firsts in nearly every course and graduated in 1921 with academic distinction.

Macdonald was hired by the Nova Scotia government as assistant deputy attorney-general immediately after graduating from law school. He worked mainly as an administrator, although he occasionally appeared in court to help the attorney general prosecute a case.

In 1922, Macdonald became a part-time lecturer at the law school. When he left the attorney-general's office in 1924, he became a full-time professor. Macdonald was a popular and effective teacher. One former student describes him sitting at his desk on the rostrum speaking slowly and deliberately while gazing intently at the ceiling. "The more students disagreed (with one another in class) the more Angus encouraged it."

On June 17, 1924, when he was 33, Macdonald married Agnes Foley, a member of a prominent Irish Catholic family. They had worked together in the attorney general's office where Foley served as secretary. Between 1925 and 1936, the Macdonalds had three daughters and a son. Agnes raised the children and ran the household after Macdonald entered politics. Biographer John Hawkins writes she eventually helped her husband win election in a Halifax riding with a significant Irish Catholic population. She had a large circle of friends including members of the powerful Liberal Women's societies of Halifax. Hawkins also notes that Agnes Macdonald was a gifted hostess who loved conversation. "Quick witted, her rapid and varied flow of language contrasted with Angus L.'s deliberate, thoughtful manner of speaking, which some have described as a 'drawl'."

In 1925–26, while teaching at the Dalhousie Law School, Macdonald took additional courses in law at Columbia University in New York, mainly by correspondence. He used these courses as the basis for full-time graduate work at the Harvard Law School in Boston, Massachusetts in 1928. Harvard's faculty members saw the law as an instrument for social improvement. That view was reflected in Macdonald's 1929 doctoral thesis on the responsibility of property holders under civil law.

When the deanship of the law school came open in 1929, Macdonald agonized over whether he should seek the job. He apparently had strong support from several members of the university's board of governors. At the same time however, he was increasingly drawn to politics and accepting the deanship would mean postponing his political ambitions indefinitely. In the end, the job was offered to Sidney Smith, another prominent Canadian academic who accepted on condition that Macdonald remain at the school. Macdonald did stay, but only for one more year. In 1930, he resigned so he would be free to enter politics.

== Early political career ==
=== Federal campaign, 1930 ===
The federal election in the summer of 1930 gave the 40-year-old Macdonald a chance to run for office. He decided to contest the riding of Inverness in his native Cape Breton. There he faced a Conservative opponent whose style contrasted sharply with his own cool and reserved manner. According to biographer John Hawkins, I. D. "Ike" MacDougall "was a gifted performer who before an audience could cut an opponent's well-marshalled arguments until they fell amid roars of laughter. He was the master of hyperbole, pun and high spirits. He could win a rural audience, not by his logic, but by his performance on the platform". Macdonald campaigned hard, but the trend was against him. The Conservatives led by R. B. Bennett defeated Mackenzie King's unpopular Liberals. And in Inverness, Ike MacDougall was re-elected by the narrow margin of 165 votes. It was to be Macdonald's only election defeat. Afterwards, Macdonald retreated to Halifax where he opened his own private law office in August 1930.

=== Provincial convention, 1930 ===
Macdonald was active in provincial Liberal Party organizational work during the latter part of the 1920s. In 1925, the party had suffered a crushing defeat after 43 years in power. On election day, the Liberals were reduced to three seats in the Nova Scotia legislature. Many believed that the time had come to return the party to its reformist roots. Macdonald worked with other reform-minded members to establish a network of younger Liberals intent on reviving their party.

In the 1928 provincial election, the Liberals regained some of their lost popularity in one of the closest votes in Nova Scotia history. The Conservatives remained in power with 23 seats to the Liberals' 20. Economic conditions worsened after the stock market crash of 1929 making it seem increasingly likely that the Liberals would return to power in the next election. Macdonald helped draft a 15-point party platform for approval at a Liberal convention in the fall of 1930. It promised an eight-hour working day and free elementary school textbooks. It also pledged to establish a formal inquiry into Nova Scotia's economic prospects and the province's place within Confederation.

The convention, held on October 1, 1930, proved to be a turning point both for the party and for Macdonald. In a departure from tradition, the party's new leader was chosen by convention delegates instead of Liberal caucus members at the legislature. Two veterans of Liberal politics, both wealthy businessmen, were contesting the leadership. There was little enthusiasm, however, for either. Just as nominations were about to close, a delegate from Truro rose unexpectedly to nominate Macdonald. Surprised, Macdonald at first declined the nomination, then agreed to accept it when he sensed strong support on the convention floor. A few hours later, the 40-year-old Macdonald had won a resounding first-ballot victory to become the new Liberal leader.

=== Liberal party leader ===
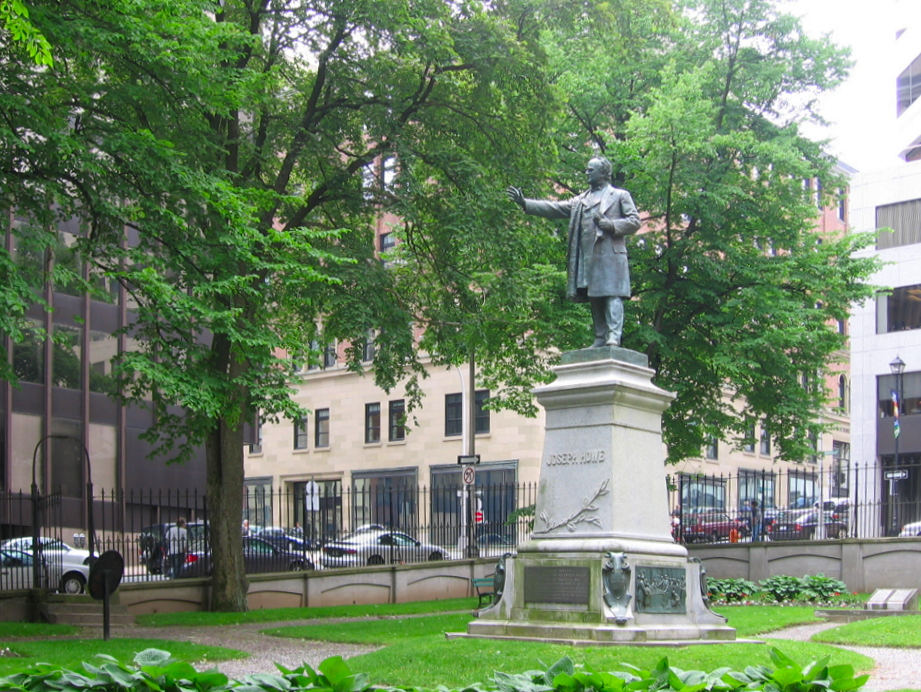
Joseph Howe statue at the Nova Scotia legislature. The Franchise Scandal enabled Macdonald to campaign as a latter-day Howe, champion of responsible government.

After winning the Liberal leadership, Macdonald travelled the province on speaking tours helping organize party support in every constituency. As Liberal leader, he proved to be an effective platform speaker. According to biographer John Hawkins, Macdonald's "plain talk and simplicity" persuaded audiences of his honesty. He developed the ability to explain political issues with a "clarity that every voter could understand". When the legislature was in session, he led the Liberals from the public galleries because he had no seat in the House. There were six vacancies, but the Conservatives refused to call by-elections fearing they would lose their five-seat majority. Macdonald publicly criticized Premier Gordon Harrington for depriving so many Nova Scotians of representation. He deplored what he called "the loss of responsible government." It was a message that struck a chord in the province that had been the first in Canada to achieve responsible government in 1848 thanks to the efforts of the great liberal Reformer Joseph Howe. Privately however, Macdonald rejoiced that the government couldn't risk calling a by-election telling one supporter years later, "If the truth must be told, I was sometimes afraid that they would open up a seat and deprive me of this sort of ammunition".

Macdonald was able to use the theme of responsible government even more effectively during the provincial election campaign of 1933. The governing Conservatives, desperate to avoid electoral defeat, had enacted changes requiring that new voters' lists be drawn up by government-appointed registrars immediately before each election. Predictably, thousands of Liberal voters were left off the lists and the new law allowed only three days for corrections. The Liberals secured a court order requiring the appointment of additional registrars and some of the disenfranchised voters were finally added to the lists. The so-called Franchise Scandal enabled the Liberal press to cast Macdonald as a latter-day Joe Howe, crusading for the rights of the people. "No newcomer to the political scene", writes historian J. Murray Beck, "has ever become so quickly, widely, and favourably known in such a dramatic fashion". The scandal, compounded by suffering in the province due to the Great Depression, resulted in Macdonald's Liberals winning 22 of the 30 seats on August 22, 1933. The Conservatives were now associated in the public mind with corruption and hard times. They did not regain power for 23 years.

== First term as premier 1933–37 ==
Macdonald was sworn in as Premier of Nova Scotia on September 5, 1933. He was 43 years old and had never held a seat in the legislature. Historian J. Murray Beck writes that Macdonald's cabinet was "probably Nova Scotia's strongest". Biographer Stephen Henderson points out that the "ministers were fresh, motivated and knowledgeable about their portfolios", although Macdonald himself had no experience in finance. Biographer John Hawkins characterizes the Liberal party of 1933 as "a party of thinkers and reformers". During the 1930s, Macdonald's Liberals took credit for leading the province out of the depths of the Great Depression. As journalist Harry Flemming wrote many years later, Macdonald became "God himself", the premier who "paved the roads and put the power into every home from Cape North to Cape Sable".

Nova Scotia is not the most prosperous part of Canada, but it is still, I hope, and always will be, I trust, a land where the higher things of life are preserved inviolate, where religion is venerated, where education is cherished, where justice is fairly administered, where law is duly observed, where the time-honoured virtue of hospitality is not forgotten, where "stranger" is still a sacred name.

Premier Angus L. Macdonald, October 2, 1937.

=== Pensions and relief programs ===
On his first day in office, Macdonald kept a key Liberal promise by bringing in old age pensions for elderly people in need. Cheques were mailed out to 6,000 pensioners by the end of March 1934. It was a popular move even though monthly pension payments in Nova Scotia were substantially below the national average.

The economic conditions facing the new government were dismal. Tens of thousands of Nova Scotians were impoverished and unemployed. The government expected that 75,000 Nova Scotians would need assistance during the coming winter. Biographer Stephen Henderson writes that Macdonald sympathized with the poor, but he worried that direct government relief payments would undermine their pride and self-respect. Even though direct relief might be cheaper, the Macdonald government preferred to hire the unemployed for public works projects such as paving roads. Henderson reports that in 1933, there were only 45 kilometres (28 mi) of paved roads in the province. By 1937, that figure had risen to 605. The government financed such public works by selling low-interest bonds and raising gasoline taxes from six to eight cents a gallon.

Macdonald also urged the federal Conservative government of R. B. Bennett to increase financial support to poorer provinces. At the time, there was no national system of unemployment insurance and the Bennett Conservatives insisted that the unemployed were mainly the responsibility of the provinces and municipalities. Although the federal government did provide relief during the Depression, Nova Scotia and the two other Maritime provinces were hampered by the federal system of matching grants for relief programs. Under that system, provinces received federal money only if they were willing to contribute a percentage of their own revenues. Thus, the poorest provinces received less federal aid than the richer ones because they couldn't afford to match the federal grants. Historian E. R. Forbes points out for example, that from January to May 1935, all three levels of government spent an average of $2.84 for each relief recipient in the Maritimes, an amount less than half the $6.18 spent in the other six provinces.

=== Jones Commission ===
Macdonald tried to deal with the financial imbalances in Confederation by appointing a Royal Commission. He asked it to recommend economic policies the province should follow to lessen the effects of the Depression and to lay out a framework for negotiations with the federal government.

The three-man Jones Commission included Harold Innis, a prominent economic historian who had studied disparities between highly developed manufacturing regions and marginal ones that depended primarily on exploiting natural resources. After touring the province and hearing from more than 200 witnesses, the Commission issued its report in December 1934. Macdonald could take satisfaction in its finding that high tariffs had sheltered central Canadian manufacturing at Nova Scotia's expense and that federal subsidies to the province were "seriously inadequate".

The Commission recommended that the federal government assume responsibility for financing social programs such as old-age pensions and unemployment insurance. It also argued that Ottawa should establish equity among provinces and that redistribution of federal tax revenues should be based on need, an idea that became central to Macdonald's thinking about federal-provincial relations. Among other things, the Commission called on the Macdonald government to continue paving roads; to undertake a program of rural electrification to keep young people on family farms; and, to establish a professional civil service that would defend Nova Scotia's interests against federal bureaucrats in Ottawa.

=== Tourism and Nova Scotian identity ===
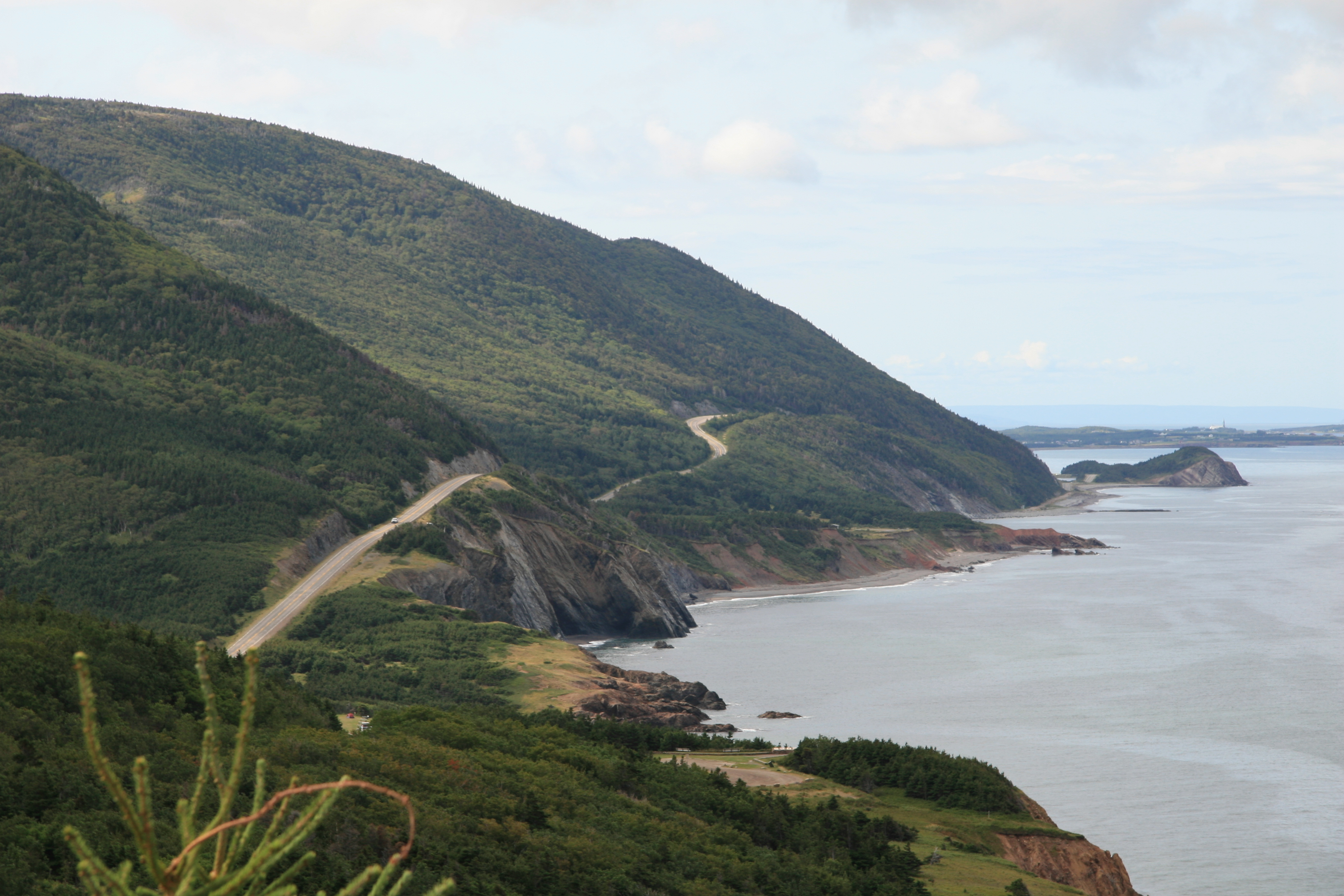
The south-west corner of Cape Breton Highlands National Park. The rocky spit on the right hand side is Presqu'Île and part of Jerome Mountain can be seen on the left.

The Macdonald government took practical steps to promote tourism as a way of bringing money into the province. It improved conditions for tourists by granting small loans to hotel, motel and cottage owners to upgrade their facilities. It also offered cooking classes to restaurant and hotel employees. The government's extensive road building program made it easier for tourists to travel. But biographer Stephen Henderson writes that Macdonald went well beyond these practical steps to promote Nova Scotia as a beautiful and rustic place peopled by colourful Scots, Acadians, Germans and Mi'kmaq. Government advertising portrayed the province "as a place where urban, middle-class families could go to 'step back in time'". Gradually, Henderson maintains, the tourism campaigns created a new identity for Nova Scotians. "They witnessed the provincial state constructing an elaborate network of modern roads; they read books and brochures extolling the beauty of the province, and they heard their premier waxing romantically about the pure, simple nobility of their ancestors." Macdonald was especially enthusiastic about "the romanticized culture of the Highland Scots". Historian Ian McKay writes that under his leadership, the provincial government gave money to the Gaelic College; bestowed Scottish names on key tourism sites and stationed "a brawny Scots piper" at the border with New Brunswick. Macdonald also helped assemble more than a quarter of a million acres (4,000 km^{2}) for the Cape Breton Highlands National Park complete with a fancy resort hotel and world-class golf course. "Macdonald believed", Henderson writes, "he had created a piece of Scotland for tourists in the New World". And, as more tourists came, Macdonald's stature grew.

=== Trade Union Act ===
The Nova Scotia legislature recognized the growing power of industrial unions in the 1930s by passing what historian Stephen Henderson calls "Canada's first piece of modern labour legislation". Although Macdonald's governing Liberals and the opposition Conservatives agreed on the need to protect union rights, the parties vied with each other to take credit for the Trade Union Act. In January 1937, Premier Macdonald carried a bottle of bootleg rum to a meeting with union officials in Sydney, Cape Breton where they gave him a draft bill based on the American National Labor Relations Act. Before the Macdonald government could introduce the bill in the legislature, the Conservatives presented a similar one of their own. The legislation faced opposition from the Canadian Manufacturers' Association during public hearings, but Liberals and Conservatives combined to pass it unanimously. The new Trade Union Act required employers to bargain with any union chosen by a majority of their employees. It also prohibited employers from firing workers for organizing a union.

=== Government patronage ===
Nova Scotia's well-entrenched system of paying off government supporters with jobs and contracts continued to flourish under the Macdonald Liberals. In his comprehensive history of Canadian patronage, journalist Jeffrey Simpson writes that the Liberals used road improvements to win votes, with highway crews "especially busy before and during election campaigns." Simpson adds that the Liberals awarded government contracts to companies approved by the party. In return, the firms were required to kickback some of the money they received to the Liberals. Biographer Stephen Henderson argues that Macdonald himself did not relish the traditional practice of filling government jobs with party supporters. Nevertheless, the "wave of partisan hirings and firings" continued as committees in each riding "scrutinized employees for inappropriate political activity and rated prospective candidates based on what they or their families had done for the Liberal party".

== Second term as premier, 1937–40 ==
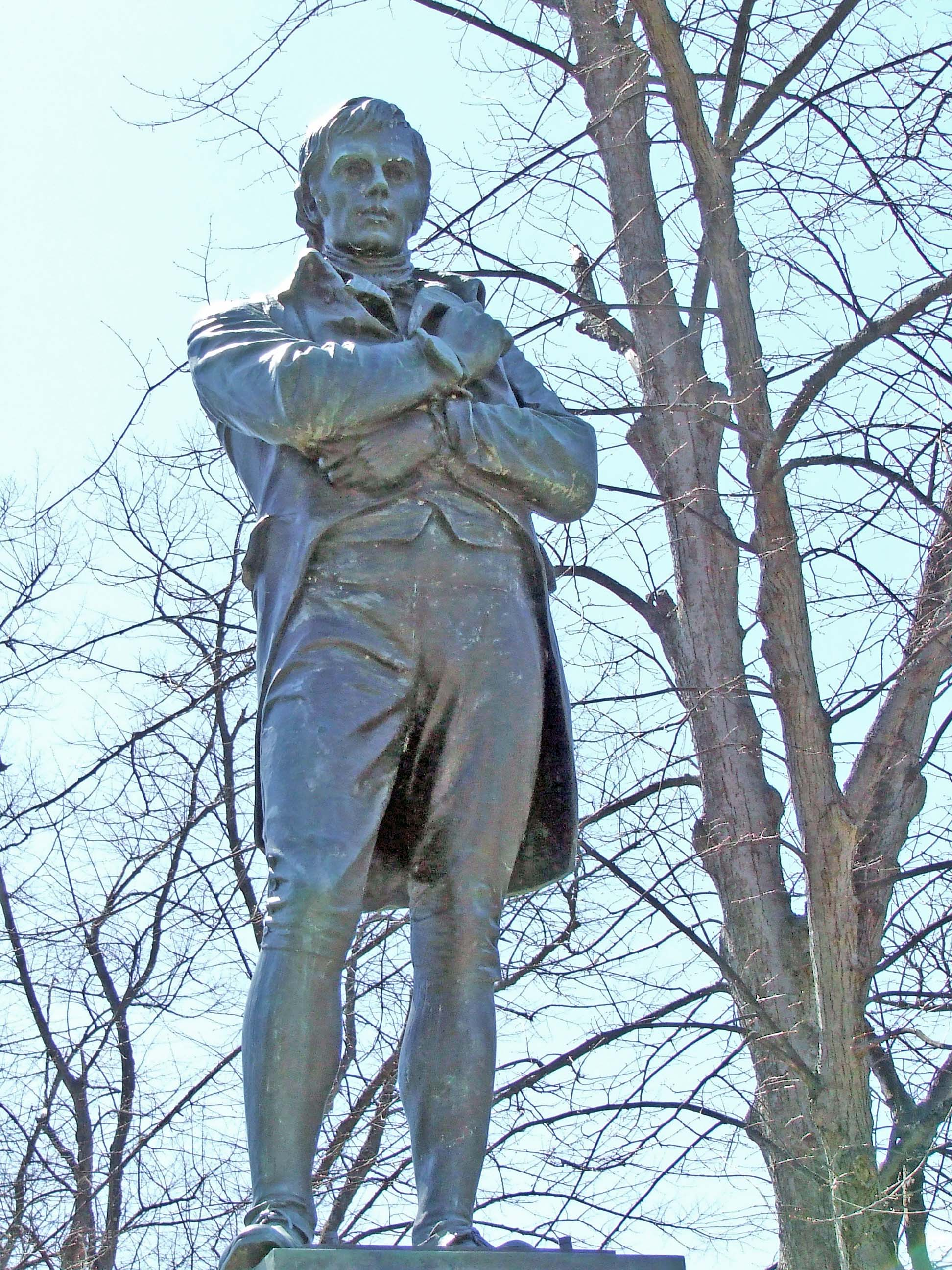
Statue of Scottish poet Robert Burns in downtown Halifax. Macdonald delivered a memorable speech on "the bard of Scotland" to the North British Society of Halifax on January 25, 1951. The Burns statue was erected by the Society in 1919.

Fortunately for the Macdonald government, economic conditions improved during the 1930s. In March 1937, Macdonald announced that after 14 years of running operating deficits, the Nova Scotia government had recorded a surplus with another forecast for the next year. The pro-Liberal Halifax Chronicle gleefully described the scene in the legislature: "the House sat for a moment, as if not comprehending the good news, then rocked with acclaim, at least the Government side of the House did, though the opposition, stilled and stunned-like, sat like figures carved in stone". Macdonald promised the government would spend another $7.5 million on its popular road paving program overseen by A. S. MacMillan, the veteran Minister of Highways. MacMillan, also Chairman of the Nova Scotia Power Commission, had been extending electrical service into rural areas. He now introduced a rural electrification bill designed to subsidize the cost of providing electricity.

After these preparations, the premier called a provincial election for June 29, 1937. Macdonald campaigned on his government's record. On election day, his Liberals were rewarded with 25 of the 30 seats in the legislature.

Prime Minister William Lyon Mackenzie King had invited Macdonald to run for federal office during the general election of 1935. Although Macdonald turned him down, there were strong rumours in 1937 that Macdonald would soon enter federal politics. Biographer Stephen Henderson writes however, that Macdonald wanted to remain as premier so he could present Nova Scotia's case to a Royal Commission on federal-provincial relations.

=== Rowell-Sirois Commission ===
The Depression of the 1930s exposed glaring weaknesses in federal-provincial financial arrangements. Canada's poorer provinces found it impossible to cope with widespread poverty and hunger while the federal government resisted taking full responsibility for unemployment relief. By 1937, conditions had become so desperate that the provinces of Manitoba and Saskatchewan faced bankruptcy. Finally, in August 1937, Prime Minister King appointed the Royal Commission on Dominion-Provincial Relations, popularly known as the Rowell-Sirois Commission. According to biographer Stephen Henderson, Macdonald played an important role in shaping the Commission's final recommendations.

Macdonald wrote Nova Scotia's submission and presented it himself when the Commission held hearings in Halifax in February 1938. He called on the federal government to take full responsibility for social programs such as unemployment insurance, old-age pensions and mothers' allowances. Macdonald recommended that the federal government be given exclusive jurisdiction over income taxes and succession duties to pay for these programs. He argued however, that to maintain their independence, the provinces needed to collect indirect sources of revenue such as sales taxes. He also called for exclusive provincial control over such minor tax fields as gasoline and electricity taxes.

A central part of Macdonald's case concerned the redistribution of wealth from richer provinces to poorer ones. His argument was based on the premise that richer provinces benefited from national economic policies such as high tariffs while poorer provinces were penalized by them. Macdonald suggested that compensatory subsidies to poorer, less-populated provinces be based on need, not population, so that they could pay for government services available in other parts of the country without having to impose higher-than-average levels of taxation.

The Commission's final report, released in May 1940, reflected many of Macdonald's recommendations. Mackenzie King called a federal-provincial conference in January 1941 to discuss the report. The provinces failed to agree on what should be done, but in April, the federal government went ahead on its own announcing it would levy steep taxes on personal and corporate incomes as a temporary measure to finance Canada's participation in the Second World War.

=== Summons to Ottawa ===
The course of Macdonald's political career changed sharply after Canada declared war on Germany in September 1939. Three months later, Mackenzie King called a federal election and on March 26, 1940, his Liberals won a decisive victory. In spite of his victory, King was under pressure to recruit the country's "best brains" into his wartime cabinet. The death of his minister of defence in an air crash in June 1940 gave King an opportunity to reorganize his administration. He asked J. L. Ralston, a native Nova Scotian, to become his new minister of defence. Ralston agreed but imposed two conditions: First that J. L. Ilsley of Nova Scotia replace him as minister of finance and second that he get assistance in his new portfolio.

King decided to appoint two additional ministers, one in charge of the Royal Canadian Air Force, the other to oversee the Royal Canadian Navy. He therefore, asked Macdonald to join the federal cabinet as minister of national defence for naval services. Macdonald, who had fought in World War I as a soldier on the front lines in France and Belgium, decided it was his duty to fight World War II as a political leader in Ottawa. He handed over his responsibilities as premier to A. S. MacMillan and was sworn into the federal cabinet on July 12, 1940.

== Wartime federal career, 1940–45 ==
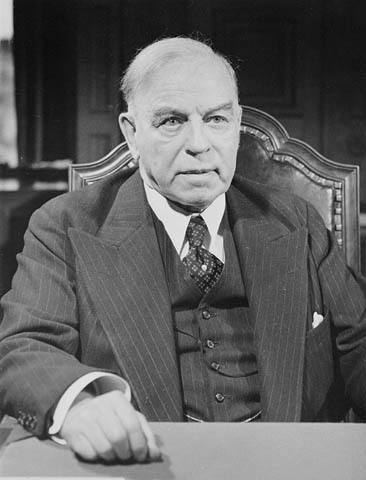
Prime Minister William Lyon Mackenzie King invited Macdonald to join his wartime cabinet in 1940. Gradually they came to despise each other.

Macdonald's five years in Ottawa were tumultuous ones. He oversaw a massive increase in Canada's naval forces and played a key role in a political crisis that threatened to tear the Liberal government and the country apart. He also incurred the wrath of Mackenzie King, a political leader whom Macdonald grew to loathe. When he entered the federal cabinet in 1940, Macdonald seemed a likely candidate to replace the aging King and one day become prime minister himself. By the time he resigned in 1945, Macdonald's federal political career was in tatters.

Mackenzie King wanted Macdonald to stand for a vacant seat in Kingston, Ontario. It was a traditional Conservative riding that had been represented by Sir John A. Macdonald, Canada's first prime minister. In 1935 however, the riding had switched to the Liberals and King wanted to keep it. "I told Mr. King that I did not know Kingston at all, nor its problems, nor its people", Macdonald wrote later. When the Conservatives agreed not to run a candidate against him however, Macdonald had no choice but to stand for office in Kingston. He won the seat by acclamation on August 12, 1940.

=== Building the navy ===
Macdonald faced a huge, but critical task in overseeing the expansion of the Royal Canadian Navy (RCN). As historian Desmond Morton points out, the RCN was tiny when Canada entered the war in 1939. It consisted of six destroyers, five minesweepers and about 3,000 personnel in its regular forces and volunteer reserves. By the time Macdonald took office in 1940, the RCN had grown to 100 ships and more than 7,000 personnel, but as biographer Stephen Henderson notes, "few of its ships and sailors were ready for service at sea". By the end of the war, the RCN had expanded by 50 times its original strength with about 400 fighting ships, almost 500 additional craft and about 96,000 men and women.

The RCN was assigned the task of escorting supply vessels transporting food and other materials needed to keep the war going. This convoy duty was critically important as German submarines or U-boats sought to starve Britain into submission by sinking supply ships. The RCN performed about 40 percent of the war's transatlantic Allied escort duty. Desmond Morton argues it was Canada's "most decisive" military contribution. Canada's convoy protection efforts did not always run smoothly, however. In the early part of the war, the Canadian navy lacked equipment that could detect underwater submarines as well as efficient radar for sighting ones on the surface. To make matters worse, Canada didn't have the long-range aircraft that were the most effective anti-submarine weapons.

As supply ship losses mounted, the RCN struggled to catch up to the better-equipped British and American navies. Macdonald himself lacked military expertise and often depended on senior naval staff who kept him in the dark about equipment shortages and other problems. "Macdonald's administration of Naval Affairs did not rise to brilliance", Henderson writes, "[but] the problem may have lain more with the senior naval staff than with Macdonald". Macdonald's conflict with high ranking naval officers, particularly Rear Admiral Percy W. Nelles, led to the effective dismissal of the latter in 1944. Yet, as the war progressed, the RCN, led by Macdonald, gradually became more effective in protecting the huge cargoes of materials on which Allied victory depended.

=== Conscription crisis ===
Biographer Stephen Henderson maintains that Macdonald played a key role in the wartime conscription crises that beset the federal government in 1942, and again in 1944, as Prime Minister Mackenzie King tried to avoid imposing compulsory military service overseas. Macdonald himself strongly favoured conscription rather than relying solely on voluntary enlistment. A committed internationalist, he believed it unfair that some bore the sacrifices of overseas service while others escaped what he saw as their military obligations. Macdonald realized however, that conscription was highly unpopular in French-speaking Quebec and that enforcing it would split the country at a time when national unity was crucial. He also recognized that in the early years of the war, voluntary enlistment was producing enough recruits to meet the needs of the armed forces.

Not necessarily conscription but conscription if necessary.

Mackenzie King's 1942 slogan ingeniously avoided any definite commitment.

Nevertheless, Macdonald continued to push the government to commit itself to conscription if circumstances should change. His position earned him the enmity of the politically cautious Mackenzie King. "Macdonald is a very vain man", the prime minister complained in his diary, "and has an exceptional opinion of himself. Undoubtedly, he came here expecting to possibly lead the Liberal party later on but has found that he will not be able to command the following that he expected".

As the opposition Conservatives continued to press for overseas conscription, the King government held a national plebiscite on April 27, 1942. The plebiscite asked voters to release the government from its previous promise not to introduce compulsory war service. The results confirmed the sharp national split. English Canada voted strongly in favour and French Canada overwhelmingly against. The results of the plebiscite seemed to strengthen the position of ministers who supported conscription. Macdonald's two cabinet colleagues from Nova Scotia, defence minister J. L. Ralston, and finance minister J. L. Ilsley, urged the government to introduce conscription immediately. A more cautious Macdonald wanted the government to commit itself to conscription should it be required to support the war effort.

The crisis flared again two years later when the Canadian military called for overseas reinforcements. Ralston wanted King to impose conscription, but at Macdonald's urging, seemed willing to compromise by going along with the prime minister's plan for one last voluntary recruitment campaign. King however, suddenly dismissed Ralston during a cabinet meeting on November 1, 1944. Macdonald considered resigning, but said later he would have struck King if he had risen to leave. Instead he sat in his chair ripping sheets of notepaper into small shreds and dropping them on the floor. Stephen Henderson writes that Macdonald's decision not to resign probably saved the King government. King himself seemed to recognize that if Macdonald had left, Ilsley would have resigned too, possibly taking other ministers with him and causing the government's collapse.

In the end, King was forced to impose overseas conscription after the failure of the voluntary recruitment campaign, but the war ended soon after and his government survived unscathed. The conscription crisis however, hardened the animosity between King and his naval minister. Macdonald, disillusioned by what he saw as the chicanery and ruthlessness of national politics, longed to return to Nova Scotia. After King called an election for June 11, 1945, Macdonald resigned from the federal cabinet.

== Third, fourth and fifth term as premier, 1945–54 ==
Princess Elizabeth and Angus L. Macdonald at the Nova Scotia Legislature, autumn 1951. In February 1952, after the death of King George VI, Macdonald opened the legislature with a speech calling the British Crown "the magic link that unites this still great Empire and Commonwealth".

When Macdonald returned to Nova Scotia in 1945, he was only 55, but the silver-haired politician now seemed 20 years older. After the retirement of Premier A. S. MacMillan, the Liberals reaffirmed Macdonald's leadership at their convention on August 31, 1945. Less than two months later, Macdonald's Liberals swept the province wiping out the Conservatives for the first time since Confederation and winning all but two Cape Breton ridings where voters elected members of the Co-operative Commonwealth Federation or CCF, the forerunner of the present-day New Democratic Party, or NDP. In spite of his huge victory, a close colleague noted that Macdonald was not the same man he had been before he left Nova Scotia in 1940. He had trouble making decisions, not because he was a procrastinator, but because he was not well.

Nevertheless, Macdonald plunged into his role as a leading champion for the provinces. He argued that in order to maintain their independence, provinces needed exclusive jurisdiction over such sources of revenue as gasoline, electricity and amusement taxes. He lobbied for constitutional amendments designed to guarantee provincial rights. Macdonald urged the federal government to accept the 1940 recommendations of the Rowell-Sirois Commission and redistribute national wealth based on need. Such a policy, he maintained, would enable poorer provinces to sustain government services available in other parts of the country without having to impose higher-than-average levels of taxation. In the end, Macdonald won only small victories such as gaining exclusive provincial access to gasoline taxes. The federal government refused to recognize financial need as the basis for provincial subsidies.

Aside from his role as a national spokesman for provincial rights, Macdonald presided over an administration that invested heavily in education. His government financed the building of rural high schools and extended financial assistance to Dalhousie University's schools of medicine and law. Macdonald also appointed Nova Scotia's first minister of education, Henry Hicks, in 1949 to oversee $7.6 million in spending, about a fifth of the provincial budget.

The Macdonald Liberals easily won re-election in 1949 and 1953, but the Conservatives made steady gains under Robert Stanfield, their new leader. The Conservatives for example, drew attention to kickback schemes under which brewing companies, wineries and distilleries contributed to the Liberal party in exchange for the right to sell their products in government liquor stores. The Liberals seemed secure against such allegations however, as long as they were led by the popular Angus L. Macdonald. However, Macdonald suffered a slight heart attack on April 11, 1954, and was admitted to hospital, where he died in his sleep two nights later, at age 63.

Stephen Henderson writes that the Nova Scotia legislature sat on the day of his death. Macdonald's seat was draped in Clanranald tartan and a sprig of heather decorated his desk. Macdonald's body lay in state for three days in the legislative building as more than 100,000 people filed past to pay their respects.

== Aftermath of Macdonald's death ==
Macdonald's death proved disastrous for provincial Liberals. There was no obvious successor to the popular premier. At the party's leadership convention held on September 9, 1954, the Liberals appeared badly split along religious lines. After five ballots, the convention rejected Harold Connolly, a Roman Catholic who had served as premier after Macdonald's death. Instead they chose the Protestant Henry Hicks. "Unfortunately for the Liberals", historian Murray Beck writes, "it appeared as if the delegates had ganged up to defeat the only Catholic among the contestants". Beck also notes that "Nova Scotia governments have always been most vulnerable after a change in leadership". In the next provincial election held on October 30, 1956, Robert Stanfield and his Conservatives won 24 seats, the Liberals 18. The 23-year Liberal era, begun under Macdonald's leadership, had finally ended.

== Assessment and legacy ==
J. Murray Beck writes that Macdonald's political appeal to Nova Scotians may have been even stronger than the legendary Joseph Howe's. Like Howe, Macdonald was a passionate and eloquent leader whose elegantly crafted speeches reflected his wit, wide learning and respect for factual accuracy. Beck writes that by scrupulously fulfilling his campaign promises, Macdonald became known as a leader who always kept his word.

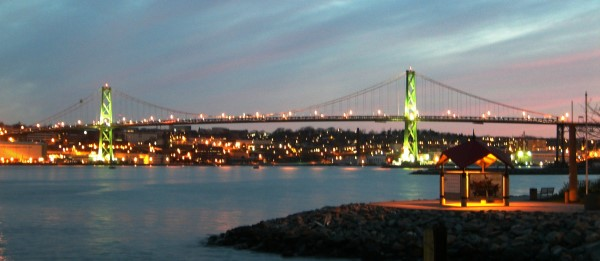
The Angus L. Macdonald Bridge. Macdonald turned the sod to begin construction on March 1, 1952. The bridge opened on April 2, 1955.

Macdonald's reputation as the premier who led the province out of the Great Depression rested on his commitment to ambitious government projects such as highway construction and rural electrification. He continued to support highway improvements throughout his career. Two projects that he pushed especially hard for, the Canso Causeway linking Cape Breton Island to mainland Nova Scotia and a suspension bridge spanning Halifax Harbour were completed after his death. The bridge, named in his honour, made it possible to travel between Halifax and Dartmouth without having to board a ferry or drive several kilometres around the Bedford Basin.

Macdonald consistently called for a more equitable redistribution of wealth, so that poorer provinces such as Nova Scotia, could share fully in Canada's prosperity. Biographer Stephen Henderson writes that Macdonald deserves credit for the introduction, in 1957, of an equalization scheme designed to enable poorer provinces to provide comparable levels of services to their citizens. Macdonald's advocacy of provincial autonomy however, fell victim to the centralizing tendencies of a post-war welfare state in which the federal government increasingly assumed greater control over national social programs.

Throughout his life, Macdonald maintained ties to his alma mater, St. Francis Xavier University. He received an honorary doctor of laws degree from St. FX in 1946. He served as honorary chair and fundraiser for the university's centennial celebrations in 1953 and raised money to support student research into the early history of the Scots in Nova Scotia. Macdonald suggested that the reading room in a new university library be called the Hall of the Clans. St. FX adopted the idea and decided to name the library in his honour. Thus, when the Angus L. Macdonald Library officially opened on July 17, 1965, 50 coats of arms representing both Scottish and Irish clans adorned the walls of its reading room.

== Notes ==
Parliament of Canada
Preceded by Charles Gavan Power	Acting Minister of National Defence for Air; 1944–1945	Succeeded by Colin W. G. Gibson
