= Buddy MacEachern =

Canadian politician (1940–2018)

Leader of the Nova Scotia New Democratic Party Interim
- In office October 1980 – November 1980
- Preceded by: Jeremy Akerman
- Succeeded by: Alexa McDonough

MLA for Cape Breton Centre
- In office 1974–1981
- Preceded by: Mike Laffin
- Succeeded by: Mike Laffin

Personal details
- Born: James MacEachern; June 29, 1940 Sydney, Nova Scotia, Canada
- Died: June 15, 2018 (aged 77) Dartmouth, Nova Scotia, Canada
- Party: New Democratic Party

James "Buddy" MacEachern (June 29, 1940 – June 15, 2018) was a Canadian politician from Nova Scotia. He represented the electoral district of Cape Breton Centre in the Nova Scotia House of Assembly from 1974 to 1981. He was a member of the Nova Scotia New Democratic Party.

== Life ==
MacEachern was born on June 29, 1940, at Sydney, Nova Scotia. He was a Catholic.

In the 1974 provincial election, MacEachern defeated Progressive Conservative incumbent Mike Laffin to win the Cape Breton Centre riding. He was re-elected in the 1978 election, and in 1980 became the party's interim leader following the resignation of Jeremy Akerman. He served for a month until a leadership convention elected Alexa McDonough as leader. At the convention, MacEachern was also a candidate, finishing third. In the 1981 election, MacEachern was defeated by the riding's former MLA, Mike Laffin.

MacEachern died on June 15, 2018, in Dartmouth, Nova Scotia.
