= George Belcher Murray =

Canadian politician

George Belcher Murray (December 25, 1895 – December 7, 1941) was a political figure in Nova Scotia, Canada. He represented Cape Breton North in the Nova Scotia House of Assembly from 1937 to 1941 as a Liberal member.

He was born in North Sydney, Nova Scotia, the son of George Henry Murray and Grace E. Moore, and was educated at King's College. Murray married Katherine Horan-Fulger. During World War I, he served as a captain in the Canadian Expeditionary Force and was awarded the Military Cross. During World War II, Murray served with the Veterans' Home Guard. He died at Burnside Magazine near Dartmouth, Nova Scotia at the age of 45.
