= Douglas MacDonald =

Canadian politician, farmer, and miner

Douglas MacDonald (1900–1996) was a farmer, miner and political figure in Nova Scotia, Canada. He represented Cape Breton Centre in the Nova Scotia House of Assembly from 1939 to 1945 as a Co-operative Commonwealth Federation member.

He was born in Georgetown, Prince Edward Island, the son of Archibald MacDonald and Annie MacKinnon. MacDonald married Lillian McLellan. He served in the artillery during World War I. He was president of the local chapter of the United Mine Workers of America. MacDonald won the first seat for the CCF in the Nova Scotia legislature in 1939; he was elected in a by-election held after Michael Dwyer resigned his seat.
