= George M. Morrison =

Canadian lawyer and political figure

George McKay Morrison (born August 28, 1902) was a lawyer and political figure in Nova Scotia, Canada. He represented Cape Breton South in the Nova Scotia House of Assembly from 1937 to 1941 as a Liberal member.

He was born in Sydney, Nova Scotia, the son of Donald Morrison and Margaret Campbell. He was educated at the Sydney Academy and Dalhousie University. Morrison served as county court judge for District Number 7 from 1946 to 1976.
