= Hiram Blanchard =

1st Premier of Nova Scotia from July 1867 to September 1867

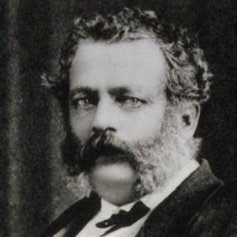

1st Premier of Nova Scotia
- In office July 4, 1867 – September 30, 1867
- Monarch: Victoria
- Lieutenant Governor: Sir William Williams, 1st Baronet, of Kars; Charles Hastings Doyle
- Preceded by: Position created Charles Tupper (colonial)
- Succeeded by: William Annand

MLA for Inverness County
- In office May 12, 1859 – October 22, 1868 Serving with Peter Smyth, Hugh McDonald, Samuel McDonnell, Alexander Campbell, Duncan J. Campbell
- Preceded by: William Young; Peter Smyth
- Succeeded by: Hugh McDonald
- In office May 16, 1871 – December 17, 1874 Serving with Duncan J. Campbell, John McKinnon
- Preceded by: Hugh McDonald
- Succeeded by: Allan MacMaster

Personal details
- Born: January 17, 1820 West River, Nova Scotia, Canada
- Died: December 17, 1874 (aged 54) Halifax, Nova Scotia, Canada
- Party: Liberal; Conservative
- Spouse: Eliza Cantrell (m. 1842)
- Relations: Jotham Blanchard (brother)
- Children: 4 daughters
- Education: Pictou Academy
- Occupation: Lawyer
- Profession: politician

Hiram Blanchard (January 17, 1820 – December 17, 1874) was a Nova Scotia lawyer, politician, and the first premier of Nova Scotia. Blanchard won election to the Nova Scotia legislative assembly in Inverness in 1859 as a Liberal.

== Early life ==
Hiram Blanchard was born in West River, Nova Scotia, on January 17, 1820, to father Jonathan Blanchard and mother Sarah Goggins. Hiram attended the same school as his brother, Jotham Blanchard, Pictou Academy. After graduating, Blanchard began studying law at Guysborough, Nova Scotia, with future Nova Scotia House of Assembly member William Frederick DesBarres and was admitted to the bar as an attorney at age 21 in November 1841. Marrying Eliza Cantrell in 1842, he was admitted to the bar as a barrister in April 1843. Shortly after his admission to the bar, Blanchard opened up a law office in the small seaside village of Port Hood, Nova Scotia, practising in the law courts of Antigonish and Guysborough. In a short time, Blanchard gained a reputation amongst those in the legal profession for his skill in examining witnesses and clear presentation of facts.

In 1860, Blanchard moved to Halifax and became engaged in a partnership with Jonathan McCully, then Solicitor General and railway commissioner in the government of Joseph Howe. There, he argued against characters such as James MacDonald, the future federal Minister of Justice and Chief Justice of the Supreme Court of Nova Scotia. Charles James Townshend, a Chief Justice of the Supreme Court of Nova Scotia, observed the courtroom encounters of McCully and Blanchard, commenting "... it was delightful and instructive to listen to [their] forensic battle. Both were men of high and honourable character, incapable of any unworthy schemes to win their cases." In 1870, Blanchard became partners with Nicholas Meagher, future Justice of the Supreme Court of Nova Scotia.

== Political career ==
In 1860, William Young left politics to become chief justice of Nova Scotia. Blanchard had been very reluctant to become involved in politics until up to just before this time. The 1859 Nova Scotia election was largely influenced between the ongoing squabbles between Roman Catholic and Protestant populations, but Hiram Blanchard's election win for the Liberals in his constituency of Inverness was based on a platform of "equal rights to all, proscription of none, favouritism to none". Blanchard rose above religious quarrels and managed to win in a Roman Catholic community, even though he was a Presbyterian himself. In the Nova Scotia House of Assembly, Blanchard drew particular attention to the plight of the insane and the deaf, two disadvantaged groups in Nova Scotia at the time. Although he supported the free schooling initiative of Premier Charles Tupper, Blanchard objected to the idea that schools should be governed by a council made up of members of the Executive Council of Nova Scotia.

Blanchard supported the idea of confederation, and after Nova Scotia became a part of Canada in 1867, he became attorney-general and leader of the Conservative Party government, as the position of leader of the government had been vacated by Charles Tupper following his run for federal politics. However, Blanchard was in his new-found position for less than three months. In the September 1867 provincial election, the issue of Nova Scotia's entry to the confederation led to the government's demise in favour of William Annand's Anti-Confederation Party, and in the newly elected Assembly, only two members, Blanchard included, supported the idea of confederation. In 1868, Blanchard's re-election to his constituency of Inverness was declared invalid as he had recently been appointed the legal advisor for the federal government in his province. In the subsequent by-election, Blanchard was defeated. In the 1871 election, he was once again elected, serving as leader of the opposition until his death on December 17, 1874, at Halifax. Blanchard was survived by his four daughters and wife.

Political offices
Preceded by Charles Tupper	Premier of Nova Scotia; 1867–1867	Succeeded by William Annand
