= 54th General Assembly of Nova Scotia =

- Majority parliament
- Feb. 28, 1985 – Jul. 30, 1988

Parliament leaders
- Premier: John Buchanan; October 5, 1978
- Leader of the Opposition: Vincent MacLean; January 9, 1985 – December 2, 1985
- Bill Gillis; December 2, 1985 – February 22, 1986
- Vincent MacLean; February 22, 1986

Party caucuses
- Government: Progressive Conservative Party
- Opposition: Liberal Party
- Recognized: New Democratic Party
- Cape Breton Labour Party

House of Assembly
- Speaker of the House: Art Donahoe; February 19, 1981
- Members: 52 MLA seats

Sovereign
- Monarch: Elizabeth II; February 6, 1952
- Lieutenant governor: Alan Abraham; February 1, 1984 – February 20, 1989

Sessions
- 1st session February 28, 1985 – February 27, 1986
- 2nd session February 27, 1986 – February 26, 1987
- 3rd session February 26, 1987 – February 25, 1988
- 4th session February 25, 1988 – July 30, 1988
← 53rd	→ 55th

54th General Assembly of Nova Scotia represented Nova Scotia between February 28, 1985, and July 30, 1988, its membership being set in the 1984 Nova Scotia general election. The Progressive Conservative Party of Nova Scotia expanded their seat share from last election, controlling more than 80% of the seats.

== Division of seats ==
The division of seats within the Nova Scotia Legislature after the general election of 1984

Leader	Party	# of Seats
John M. Buchanan	Progressive Conservative	42
A.M. (Sandy) Cameron	Liberal	6
Alexa McDonough	NDP	3
Paul MacEwan	Cape Breton Labour Party	1
Total		52

== List of members ==
Name	Party	Riding	First elected / previously elected
Gerry Sheehy	Progressive Conservative	Annapolis East	1970
Greg Kerr	Progressive Conservative	Annapolis West	1978
J. William Gillis	Liberal	Antigonish	1970
Neil LeBlanc	Progressive Conservative	Argyle	1984
Kenneth Streatch	Progressive Conservative	Bedford - Musquodoboit Valley	1978
Mike Laffin	Progressive Conservative	Cape Breton Centre	1963, 1981
Donnie MacLeod	Progressive Conservative	Cape Breton East	1980
Brian Young	Progressive Conservative	Cape Breton North	1981
Paul MacEwan	Cape Breton Labour Party	Cape Breton Nova	1970 (Note: First elected as a New Democrat)
Paul MacEwan	Independent	Cape Breton Nova	1970
Vincent J. MacLean	Liberal	Cape Breton South	1974
John A. Newell	Progressive Conservative	Cape Breton The Lakes	1983
Donnie MacLeod	Progressive Conservative	Cape Breton West	1981
Guy LeBlanc	Progressive Conservative	Clare	1984
Jack Coupar	Progressive Conservative	Colchester North	1984
R. Colin Stewart	Progressive Conservative	Colchester South	1978
David Nantes	Progressive Conservative	Cole Harbour	1978
Guy Brown	Liberal	Cumberland Centre	1974
Roger Stuart Bacon	Progressive Conservative	Cumberland East	1970
Gardner (Bud) Hurley	Progressive Conservative	Cumberland West	1984
Jim Smith	Liberal	Dartmouth East	1984
Laird Stirling	Progressive Conservative	Dartmouth North	1978
Roland J. Thornhill	Progressive Conservative	Dartmouth South	1974
Merryl Lawton	Progressive Conservative	Digby	1984
Chuck MacNeil	Progressive Conservative	Guysborough	1984
John M. Buchanan	Progressive Conservative	Halifax Atlantic	1967
Joel Matheson	Progressive Conservative	Halifax Bedford Basin	1978
Alexa McDonough	NDP	Halifax Chebucto	1981
Arthur R. Donahoe †	Progressive Conservative	Halifax Citadel	1978
Terence R. B. Donahoe	Progressive Conservative	Halifax Cornwallis	1978
Tom McInnis	Progressive Conservative	Halifax Eastern Shore	1978
Edmund L. Morris	Progressive Conservative	Halifax Needham	1980
Jerry Lawrence	Progressive Conservative	Halifax St. Margarets	1978
Cora H. Etter	Progressive Conservative	Hants East	1984
Ron Russell	Progressive Conservative	Hants West	1978
Jim MacLean	Progressive Conservative	Inverness North	1963, 1984
Billy Joe MacLean	Progressive Conservative	Inverness South	1981
Billy Joe MacLean	Independent	Inverness South	1981
George Archibald	Progressive Conservative	Kings North	1984
Bob Levy	NDP	Kings South	1984
George Moody	Progressive Conservative	Kings West	1978
Maxine Cochran	Progressive Conservative	Lunenburg Centre	1984
Jim Barkhouse	Liberal	Lunenburg East	1984
Mel Pickings	Progressive Conservative	Lunenburg West	1978
Jack MacIsaac	Progressive Conservative	Pictou Centre	1977
Donald W. Cameron	Progressive Conservative	Pictou East	1974
Donald P. McInnes	Progressive Conservative	Pictou West	1978
John Leefe	Progressive Conservative	Queens	1978
Greg MacIsaac	Progressive Conservative	Richmond	1981
John Holm	NDP	Sackville	1984
Harold Huskilson	Liberal	Shelburne	1970
Ron Giffin	Progressive Conservative	Truro-Bible Hill	1978
Fisher Hudson	Progressive Conservative	Victoria	1967, 1980
Alex McIntosh	Progressive Conservative	Yarmouth	1984

† denotes the speaker

== Notes ==
Preceded by 53rd General Assembly of Nova Scotia	General Assemblies of Nova Scotia; 1984–1988	Succeeded by 55th General Assembly of Nova Scotia
