= 53rd General Assembly of Nova Scotia =

- Majority parliament
- Feb. 18, 1982 – Sep. 28, 1984

Parliament leaders
- Premier: John Buchanan; October 5, 1978
- Leader of the Opposition: A.M. (Sandy) Cameron; June 8, 1980 – November 6, 1984

Party caucuses
- Government: Progressive Conservative Party
- Opposition: Liberal Party
- Recognized: New Democratic Party

House of Assembly
- Speaker of the House: Art Donahoe; February 19, 1981
- Members: 52 MLA seats

Sovereign
- Monarch: Elizabeth II; February 6, 1952
- Lieutenant governor: John Elvin Shaffner; December 23, 1978 – February 1, 1984
- Alan Abraham; February 1, 1984

Sessions
- 1st session February 18, 1982 – February 24, 1983
- 2nd session February 24, 1983 – February 27, 1984
- 3rd session February 27, 1984 – September 28, 1984
| ← 52nd | → 54th |

53rd General Assembly of Nova Scotia represented Nova Scotia between February 18, 1982, and November 6, 1984, its membership being set in the 1981 Nova Scotia general election. John M. Buchanan led the Progressive Conservatives to a Majority Government.

== Division of seats ==
The division of seats within the Nova Scotia Legislature after the General Election of 1981

| Leader | Party | # of Seats |
|---|---|---|
| John M. Buchanan | Progressive Conservative | 37 |
| A.M. (Sandy) Cameron | Liberal | 13 |
| Alexa McDonough | NDP | 1 |
| Independent | | 1 |
| Total | | 52 |

== List of members ==
| Name | Party | Riding | First elected / previously elected |
|---|---|---|---|
| Gerry Sheehy | Progressive Conservative | Annapolis East | 1970 |
| Greg Kerr | Progressive Conservative | Annapolis West | 1978 |
| J. William Gillis | Liberal | Antigonish | 1970 |
| Hugh Tinkham | Liberal | Argyle | 1974 |
| Kenneth Streatch | Progressive Conservative | Bedford - Musquodoboit Valley | 1978 |
| Mike Laffin | Progressive Conservative | Cape Breton Centre | 1963, 1981 |
| Donnie MacLeod | Progressive Conservative | Cape Breton East | 1980 |
| Brian Young | Progressive Conservative | Cape Breton North | 1981 |
| Paul MacEwan | Independent | Cape Breton Nova | 1970 (Note: First elected as a New Democrat) |
| Paul MacEwan | Cape Breton Labour | Cape Breton Nova | 1970 |
| Vincent J. MacLean | Liberal | Cape Breton South | 1974 |
| Ossie Fraser | Liberal | Cape Breton The Lakes | 1976 |
| John Newell (1983) | Progressive Conservative | Cape Breton The Lakes | 1983 |
| Donnie MacLeod | Progressive Conservative | Cape Breton West | 1981 |
| Chester Melanson | Liberal | Clare | 1981 |
| Ed Lorraine | Liberal | Colchester North | 1981 |
| R. Collin Stewart | Progressive Conservative | Colchester South | 1978 |
| David Nantes | Progressive Conservative | Cole Harbour | 1978 |
| Guy Brown | Liberal | Cumberland Centre | 1974 |
| Roger Stuart Bacon | Progressive Conservative | Cumberland East | 1970 |
| D. L. George Henley | Progressive Conservative | Cumberland West | 1963 |
| Richard L. Weldon | Progressive Conservative | Dartmouth East | 1978 |
| Laird Stirling | Progressive Conservative | Dartmouth North | 1978 |
| Roland J. Thornhill | Progressive Conservative | Dartmouth South | 1974 |
| Joe Casey | Liberal | Digby | 1970 |
| A. M. (Sandy) Cameron | Liberal | Guysborough | 1973 |
| John M. Buchanan | Progressive Conservative | Halifax Atlantic | 1967 |
| Joel Matheson | Progressive Conservative | Halifax Bedford Basin | 1978 |
| Alexa McDonough | NDP | Halifax Chebucto | 1981 |
| Arthur R. Donahoe † | Progressive Conservative | Halifax Citadel | 1978 |
| Terence R. B. Donahoe | Progressive Conservative | Halifax Cornwallis | 1978 |
| Tom McInnis | Progressive Conservative | Halifax Eastern Shore | 1978 |
| Edmond L. Morris | Progressive Conservative | Halifax Needham | 1980 |
| Jerry Lawrence | Progressive Conservative | Halifax St. Margarets | 1978 |
| Jack Hawkins | Liberal | Hants East | 1970, 1981 |
| Ron Russell | Progressive Conservative | Hants West | 1978 |
| John Archie MacKenzie | Liberal | Inverness North | 1970 |
| Billy Joe MacLean | Progressive Conservative | Inverness South | 1981 |
| Edward Twohig | Progressive Conservative | Kings North | 1978 |
| Harry How | Progressive Conservative | Kings South | 1970 |
| Paul Kinsman (1984) | Progressive Conservative | Kings South | 1963, (Note: Kings West) 1984 |
| George Moody | Progressive Conservative | Kings West | 1978 |
| Bruce Cochran | Progressive Conservative | Lunenburg Centre | 1974 |
| Maxine Cochran (1984) | Progressive Conservative | Lunenburg Centre | 1984 |
| Ron Barkhouse | Progressive Conservative | Lunenburg East | 1974 |
| Mel Pickings | Progressive Conservative | Lunenburg West | 1978 |
| Jack MacIsaac | Progressive Conservative | Pictou Centre | 1977 |
| Donald W. Cameron | Progressive Conservative | Pictou East | 1974 |
| Donald P. McInnes | Progressive Conservative | Pictou West | 1978 |
| John Leefe | Progressive Conservative | Queens | 1978 |
| Greg MacIsaac | Progressive Conservative | Richmond | 1981 |
| Malcolm A. MacKay | Progressive Conservative | Sackville | 1978 |
| Harold Huskilson | Liberal | Shelburne | 1970 |
| Ron Giffin | Progressive Conservative | Truro-Bible Hill | 1978 |
| Fisher Hudson | Progressive Conservative | Victoria | 1967, 1980 |
| Fraser Mooney | Liberal | Yarmouth | 1970 |

† denotes the speaker

== Former members of the 53rd General Assembly ==
| Name | Party | Electoral District | Cause of departure | Succeeded by | Elected |
|---|---|---|---|---|---|
| Ossie Fraser | Liberal | Cape Breton The Lakes | death | John Newell, PC | February 22, 1983 |
| Harry How | Progressive Conservative | Kings South | resignation | Paul Kinsman, PC | February 12, 1984 |
| Bruce Cochran | Progressive Conservative | Lunenburg Centre | died | Maxine Cochran, PC | June 5, 1984 |

== Notes ==
| Preceded by 52nd General Assembly of Nova Scotia | General Assemblies of Nova Scotia; 1981–1984 | Succeeded by 54th General Assembly of Nova Scotia |
