= William MacLean =

William MacLean may refer to:

- William Findlay Maclean (1854–1929), Canadian politician
- William Ross MacLean (1872–1931), Canadian soda water manufacturer and political figure in British Columbia
- William N. MacLean (1907–1997), Canadian politician
- William Q. MacLean Jr. (1934–2026), American politician in Massachusetts
- Billy Joe MacLean (1936–2025), Canadian politician

== See also ==
- William McLean (disambiguation)
- William McClean (1842–?), Barbadian cricketer
- Will Maclean, Scottish artist and professor of art
