= 1981 Nova Scotia general election =

Canadian provincial election

- October 6, 1981

52 seats of the Nova Scotia House of Assembly 27 seats needed for a majority
- Turnout: 74.17% ▼4.06pp
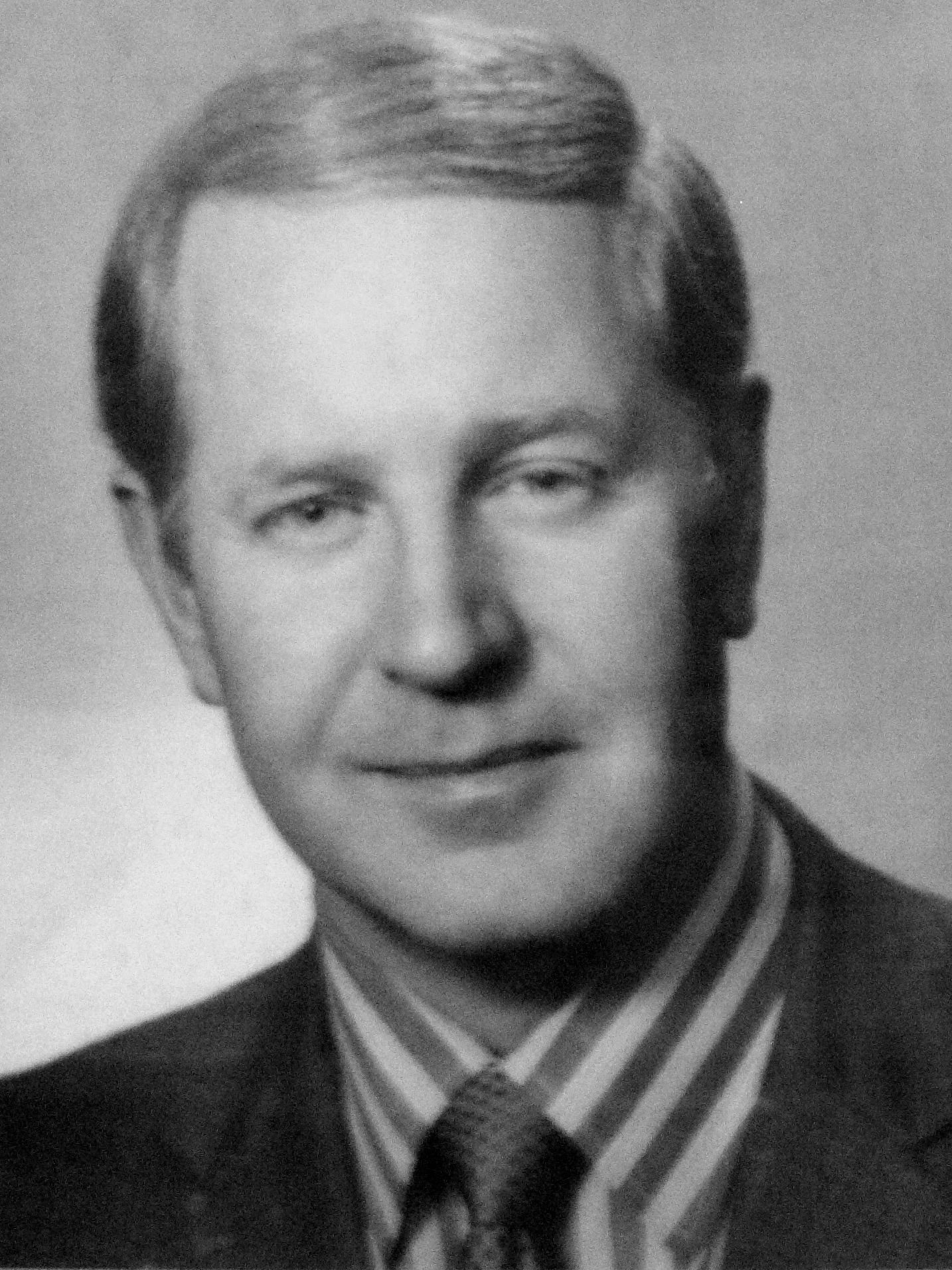

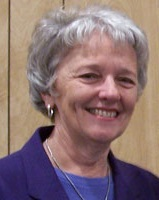
| | First party | Second party | Third party |
|---|---|---|---|
| | | Lib |
| Leader | John Buchanan | A.M. "Sandy" Cameron | Alexa McDonough |
| Party | Progressive Conservative | Liberal | New Democratic |
| Leader since | March 6, 1971 | June 8, 1980 | November 16, 1980 |
| Leader's seat | Halifax Atlantic | Guysborough | Ran in Halifax Chebucto (won) |
| Last election | 31 | 17 | 4 |
| Seats won | 37 | 13 | 1 |
| Seat change | ▲6 | ▼4 | ▼3 |
| Popular vote | 200,228 | 139,604 | 76,289 |
| Percentage | 47.28% | 32.96% | 18.01% |
| Swing | ▲1.80pp | ▼6.20pp | ▲3.71pp |
Premier before election
John Buchanan
Progressive Conservative
Premier after election
John Buchanan
Progressive Conservative

The 1981 Nova Scotia general election was held on October 6, 1981, to elect members of the 53rd House of Assembly of the province of Nova Scotia, Canada. It was won by the Progressive Conservative party.

== Results ==
=== Results by party ===
↓
| 37 | 13 | 1 | 1 |
| Progressive Conservative | Liberal | New Democratic | Independent |

Official results
| Party | Party leader | # of candidates | Seats | | | | Popular vote | | |
| Party | Party leader | # of candidates | 1978 | Dissolution | Elected | Change | # | % | Change (pp) |
|---|---|---|---|---|---|---|---|---|---|
| Progressive Conservative | John Buchanan | 52 | 31 | 34 | 37 | +6 | 200,228 | 47.28% | +1.80% |
| Liberal | A.M. "Sandy" Cameron | 52 | 17 | 15 | 13 | -4 | 139,604 | 32.96% | -6.20% |
| New Democratic | Alexa McDonough | 52 | 4 | 2 | 1 | -3 | 76,289 | 18.01% | +3.71% |
| Independent | | 6 | 0 | 1 | 1 | 0 | 5,002 | 1.18% | +0.73% |
| Vacant | | | | 0 | | | | | |
| Total valid votes | | | | | | | 421,123 | 99.43% | +0.04% |
| Blank and invalid ballots | | | | | | | 2,403 | 0.57% | -0.04% |
| Total | | 162 | 52 | 52 | 52 | – | 423,526 | 100.00% | – |
| Registered voters / turnout | | | | | | | 570,987 | 74.17% | -4.06% |

Popular vote
| PC | 47.28% |
| Liberal | 32.96% |
| New Democratic | 18.01% |
| Independent | 1.18% |

Seats summary
| PC | 71.15% |
| Liberal | 25.00% |
| New Democratic | 1.92% |
| Independent | 1.92% |

=== Results by region ===
| Party name | | HRM | Cape Breton | Annapolis Valley | South Shore | Fundy-Northeast | Central Nova | Total |
Parties winning seats in the legislature
| Progressive Conservative | Seats: | 13 | 7 | 6 | 4 | 4 | 3 | 37 |
| Progressive Conservative | Popular vote: | 47.87% | 40.16% | 51.61% | 49.85% | 49.22% | 52.25% | 47.28% |
| Liberal | Seats: | 0 | 3 | 2 | 3 | 3 | 2 | 13 |
| Liberal | Popular vote: | 27.15% | 39.46% | 30.29% | 37.50% | 35.25% | 35.29% | 32.96% |
| New Democratic Party | Seats: | 1 | 0 | 0 | 0 | 0 | 0 | 1 |
| New Democratic Party | Popular vote: | 24.89% | 15.31% | 18.10% | 12.65% | 15.44% | 11.79% | 18.01% |
| Independents | Seats: | 0 | 1 | 0 | 0 | 0 | 0 | 1 |
| Independents | Popular vote: | 0.08% | 5.08% | – | – | 0.10% | 0.67% | 1.18% |
| Total seats: | | 14 | 11 | 8 | 7 | 7 | 5 | 52 |

== Retiring incumbents ==
Liberal

- Benoit Comeau, Clare

== Nominated candidates ==
Legend
bold denotes party leader
† denotes an incumbent who is not running for re-election or was defeated in nomination contest

=== Valley ===
| Electoral district | Candidates | | | | Incumbent |
| Electoral district | PC | Liberal | NDP | Independent | Incumbent |
|---|---|---|---|---|---|
| Annapolis East | Gerry Sheehy; 3,700; 56.40% | Hugh Laurence; 2,006; 30.58% | Joan M. Boutilier; 854; 13.02% | | Gerry Sheehy |
| Annapolis West | Greg Kerr; 2,784; 53.57% | Herb Anderson; 1,894; 36.44% | John R. Taylor; 519; 9.99% | | Greg Kerr |
| Clare | Guy LeBlanc; 2,173; 38.00% | Chester Melanson; 2,228; 38.96% | Paul Denis Comeau; 1,317; 23.03% | | Benoit Comeau† |
| Digby | John Comeau; 2,643; 41.70% | Joseph H. Casey; 2,918; 46.04% | Bill Redden; 777; 12.26% | | Joseph H. Casey |
| Hants West | Ron Russell; 4,554; 51.51% | Daniel J. McGrath; 2,661; 30.10% | Alan Squires; 1,626; 18.39% | | Ron Russell |
| Kings North | Edward Twohig; 3,369; 43.61% | Lennie White; 2,041; 26.42% | Bob Levy; 2,316; 29.98% | | Edward Twohig |
| Kings South | Harry How; 4,356; 65.47% | Betty Deal; 933; 14.02% | Evelyn Garbary; 1,364; 20.50% | | Harry How |
| Kings West | George Moody; 5,286; 59.43% | Dan Weir; 2,259; 25.40% | Carolyn Queen; 1,349; 15.17% | | George Moody |

=== South Shore ===
| Electoral district | Candidates | | | | Incumbent |
| Electoral district | PC | Liberal | NDP | Independent | Incumbent |
|---|---|---|---|---|---|
| Argyle | Peter J. Boudreau; 2,092; 39.32% | Hugh Tinkham; 2,872; 53.97% | Roy Sonny Murphy; 357; 6.71% | | Hugh Tinkham; Yarmouth |
| Lunenburg Centre | Bruce Cochran; 5,374; 54.40% | Alan V. Parish; 3,355; 33.96% | Neil Theriault; 1,150; 11.64% | | Bruce Cochran |
| Lunenburg East | Ron Barkhouse; 2,802; 55.49% | Dave Cook; 1,180; 23.37% | Janet Mooney; 1,068; 21.15% | | Ron Barkhouse |
| Lunenburg West | Mel Pickings; 3,875; 53.66% | Pauline Himmelman; 2,319; 32.11% | Carl E. Simpson; 1,027; 14.22% | | Mel Pickings |
| Queens | John Leefe; 4,114; 65.19% | Mervin W. Hartlen; 1,511; 23.94% | David K. Sampson; 686; 10.87% | | John Leefe |
| Shelburne | Warren Doane; 3,440; 42.21% | Harold Huskilson; 3,765; 46.20% | Laurie Hitchens; 945; 11.60% | | Harold Huskilson |
| Yarmouth | Benoit Robichaud; 3,389; 40.39% | Fraser Mooney; 3,868; 46.10% | Hartley Wickens; 1,134; 13.51% | | Fraser Mooney |

=== Fundy-Northeast ===
| Electoral district | Candidates | | | | Incumbent |
| Electoral district | PC | Liberal | NDP | Independent | Incumbent |
|---|---|---|---|---|---|
| Colchester North | Bill Campbell; 3,171; 42.40% | Ed Lorraine; 3,182; 42.55% | Allan Marchbank; 1,126; 15.06% | | Bill Campbell |
| Colchester South | R. Colin Stewart; 3,281; 56.48% | Laurence Mersereau Nason; 1,683; 28.97% | Chester Rice; 799; 13.75% | Bob Kirk; 46; 0.79% | R. Colin Stewart |
| Cumberland Centre | Arthur L. Brennan; 1,469; 33.86% | Guy Brown; 2,579; 59.45% | Florence Welton; 290; 6.69% | | Guy Brown |
| Cumberland East | Roger Stuart Bacon; 4,663; 53.08% | Shelagh Frances Rayworth; 2,413; 27.47% | Hal Davidson; 1,709; 19.45% | | Roger Stuart Bacon |
| Cumberland West | D. L. George Henley; 2,745; 54.12% | Bartley Babineau; 1,717; 33.85% | Doug Meekins; 610; 12.03% | | D. L. George Henley |
| Hants East | G. Patrick Hunt; 2,983; 38.39% | Jack Hawkins; 3,041; 39.13% | Harry McNeil; 1,747; 22.48% | | G. Patrick Hunt |
| Truro—Bible Hill | Ron Giffin; 5,024; 61.55% | Sylvia Roy; 2,097; 25.69% | Tom Barron; 1,041; 12.75% | | Ron Giffin |

=== Central Halifax ===
| Electoral district | Candidates | | | | Incumbent |
| Electoral district | PC | Liberal | NDP | Independent | Incumbent |
|---|---|---|---|---|---|
| Halifax Bedford Basin | Joel Matheson; 6,087; 49.41% | John Genik; 3,240; 26.30% | Peter Delefes; 2,993; 24.29% | | Joel Matheson |
| Halifax Chebucto | Dugger McNeil; 3,394; 35.04% | Walter Fitzgerald; 2,407; 24.84% | **Alexa McDonough**; 3,886; 40.12% | | Walter Fitzgerald |
| Halifax Citadel | Art Donahoe; 4,141; 44.55% | Brenda Shannon; 2,690; 28.94% | Tom Sinclair-Faulkner; 2,465; 26.52% | | Art Donahoe |
| Halifax Cornwallis | Terry Donahoe; 4,927; 46.79% | Dean Salsman; 2,867; 27.22% | Michael Coyle; 2,737; 25.99% | | Terry Donahoe |
| Halifax Needham | Edmund L. Morris; 3,300; 38.05% | Dan Clarke; 2,801; 32.30% | Phil Davis; 2,572; 29.66% | | Edmund L. Morris |

=== Suburban Halifax ===
| Electoral district | Candidates | | | | Incumbent |
| Electoral district | PC | Liberal | NDP | Independent | Incumbent |
|---|---|---|---|---|---|
| Bedford-Musquodoboit Valley | Ken Streatch; 4,929; 57.62% | Dwight Isenor; 2,246; 26.26% | Bruce Carroll; 1,379; 16.12% | | Ken Streatch |
| Halifax Atlantic | **John Buchanan**; 6,023; 60.29% | Roma J. Aiken; 1,744; 17.46% | Rene Quigley; 2,108; 21.10% | Art Canning; 115; 1.15% | John Buchanan |
| Halifax-St. Margaret's | Jerry Lawrence; 4,860; 50.26% | Helena Poirier; 2,617; 27.06% | Lillian Viau; 2,193; 22.68% | | Jerry Lawrence |
| Sackville | Malcolm A. MacKay; 4,687; 42.55% | Murdock MacKay; 3,478; 31.58% | John Holm; 2,849; 25.87% | | Malcolm A. MacKay |

=== Dartmouth/Cole Harbour/Eastern Shore ===
| Electoral district | Candidates | | | | Incumbent |
| Electoral district | PC | Liberal | NDP | Independent | Incumbent |
|---|---|---|---|---|---|
| Cole Harbour | David Nantes; 4,605; 51.20% | Rae Austin; 2,229; 24.78% | Steve MacDonald; 2,160; 24.02% | | David Nantes |
| Dartmouth East | Richard L. Weldon; 4,253; 42.51% | Jim Smith; 3,351; 33.50% | Gerry Legere; 2,400; 23.99% | | Richard L. Weldon |
| Dartmouth North | Laird Stirling; 3,925; 46.17% | Don Valardo; 2,419; 28.46% | Mark Flannigan; 2,157; 25.37% | | Laird Stirling |
| Dartmouth South | Roland J. Thornhill; 4,215; 46.81% | Will Chisholm; 2,463; 27.35% | John Lewis Bregante; 2,327; 25.84% | | Roland J. Thornhill |
| Halifax Eastern Shore | Tom McInnis; 5,639; 59.32% | Angus MacNeil; 2,302; 24.22% | Bruce Beasley; 1,565; 16.46% | | Tom McInnis |

=== Central Nova ===
| Electoral district | Candidates | | | | Incumbent |
| Electoral district | PC | Liberal | NDP | Independent | Incumbent |
|---|---|---|---|---|---|
| Antigonish | Angus MacIsaac; 4,271; 43.90% | Bill Gillis; 4,522; 46.47% | John Arthur Murphy; 937; 9.63% | | Bill Gillis |
| Guysborough | Jim Johnson; 3,119; 42.76% | **A.M. "Sandy" Cameron**; 3,723; 51.03% | Art Livingston; 453; 6.21% | | A.M. "Sandy" Cameron |
| Pictou Centre | Jack MacIsaac; 6,673; 59.62% | Tom DeWolfe; 2,634; 23.53% | Kim Murray; 1,885; 16.84% | | Jack MacIsaac |
| Pictou East | Donald Cameron; 4,347; 60.88% | Harold Lowe; 1,833; 25.67% | Hasse Lindblad; 960; 13.45% | | Donald Cameron |
| Pictou West | Donald P. McInnes; 3,473; 53.24% | Doris Rink; 2,066; 31.67% | Jim Scanlan; 702; 10.76% | Franklin R. Fiske; 282; 4.32% | Donald P. McInnes |

=== Cape Breton ===
| Electoral district | Candidates | | | | Incumbent |
| Electoral district | PC | Liberal | NDP | Independent | Incumbent |
|---|---|---|---|---|---|
| Cape Breton Centre | Mike Laffin; 3,276; 39.49% | Art MacDonald; 2,208; 26.62% | Buddy MacEachern; 2,812; 33.90% | | Buddy MacEachern |
| Cape Breton East | Donnie MacLeod; 4,699; 45.55% | Shelly McNeil; 3,053; 29.59% | Joe Kanary; 1,849; 17.92% | Blair Matheson; 716; 6.94% | Donnie MacLeod |
| Cape Breton North | Brian Young; 4,187; 43.51% | Nash Brogan; 3,128; 32.51% | Len J. Arsenault; 2,307; 23.98% | | Len J. Arsenault |
| Cape Breton Nova | Russell Brake; 1,487; 19.42% | Earle Tubrett; 2,307; 30.13% | Tony Gale; 173; 2.26% | Paul MacEwan; 3,691; 48.20% | Paul MacEwan |
| Cape Breton South | Murray Hannem; 3,824; 32.16% | Vince MacLean; 6,633; 55.78% | Linda Gallant; 1,435; 12.07% | | Vince MacLean |
| Cape Breton—The Lakes | John Newell; 3,316; 41.51% | Ossie Fraser; 3,436; 43.01% | Douglas D. MacDonald; 1,237; 15.48% | | Ossie Fraser |
| Cape Breton West | "Big" Donnie MacLeod; 4,125; 42.59% | David Muise; 3,735; 38.56% | Elizabeth Cusack Walsh; 1,826; 18.85% | | David Muise |
| Inverness North | Daniel Rankin; 3,160; 42.17% | John Archie MacKenzie; 3,770; 50.31% | Eleanor Joyce Gillis; 564; 7.53% | | John Archie MacKenzie; Inverness |
| Inverness South | Billy Joe MacLean; 2,469; 46.82% | William MacEachern; 2,407; 45.65% | Bill Martin; 397; 7.53% | | William MacEachern; Inverness |
| Richmond | Greg MacIsaac; 3,173; 46.03% | John E. LeBrun; 2,821; 40.93% | Shirley McNamara; 899; 13.04% | | John E. LeBrun |
| Victoria | Fisher Hudson; 2,357; 50.02% | Merrill D. Buchanan; 1,952; 41.43% | Frank Reid; 251; 5.33% | Duncan J. Beaton; 152; 3.23% | Fisher Hudson |
