= Roderick MacLean (politician) =

Canadian politician

MLA for Inverness
- In office 1949 – January 30, 1962
- Preceded by: Alexander H. McKinnon
- Succeeded by: William N. MacLean

Personal details
- Born: November 15, 1900 Inverness, Nova Scotia
- Died: January 30, 1962 (aged 61) Inverness, Nova Scotia
- Party: Nova Scotia Liberal Party
- Occupation: businessman

Roderick MacLean (November 15, 1900 – January 30, 1962) was a Canadian politician. He represented the electoral district of Inverness in the Nova Scotia House of Assembly from 1949 to 1962. He was a member of the Nova Scotia Liberal Party.

Born in 1900 at Inverness, Nova Scotia, MacLean was educated at Dalhousie University. He married Etta Maud Hammond in 1937. From 1937 to 1949, MacLean was a municipal councillor for Inverness County, serving from 1943 to 1949 as warden. MacLean entered provincial politics in the 1949 election, winning the dual-member Inverness riding with Liberal Alexander H. McKinnon. He was re-elected in 1953. Maclean was re-elected in the 1956, and 1960 elections, serving with Liberal Joseph Clyde Nunn. MacLean died in office on January 30, 1962. He was succeeded as MLA by his brother, William N. MacLean.
