= 55th General Assembly of Nova Scotia =

1989–1993 House of Assembly session

- Majority parliament
- Feb. 23, 1989 – Apr. 16, 1993

Parliament leaders
- Premier: John Buchanan; October 5, 1978 – September 12, 1990
- Roger Bacon; September 12, 1990 – February 26, 1991
- Donald Cameron; February 26, 1991 – June 11, 1993
- Leader of the Opposition: Vincent MacLean; February 22, 1986 – March 3, 1992
- Bill Gillis; March 21, 1992 – June 11, 1993

Party caucuses
- Government: Progressive Conservative Party
- Opposition: Liberal Party
- Recognized: New Democratic Party

House of Assembly
- Speaker of the House: Art Donahoe; February 19, 1981 – February 26, 1991
- Ron Russell; May 10, 1991 – April 16, 1993
- Members: 52 MLA seats

Sovereign
- Monarch: Elizabeth II; February 6, 1952
- Lieutenant governor: Lloyd Crouse; February 20, 1989

Sessions
- 1st session February 23, 1989 – February 22, 1990
- 2nd session February 22, 1990 – April 16, 1993
← 54th	→ 56th

55th General Assembly of Nova Scotia represented Nova Scotia between February 23, 1989, and April 16, 1993, its membership being set in the 1988 Nova Scotia general election. Roger Bacon replaced John Buchanan as leader of the Progressive Conservative Party of Nova Scotia and Premier in 1990.

== Division of seats ==
The division of seats within the Nova Scotia Legislature after the general election of 1988

Leader	Party	# of Seats
John M. Buchanan	Progressive Conservative	28
Vincent J. MacLean	Liberal	21
Alexa McDonough	NDP	2
	Independent	1
Total		52

== List of members ==
Name	Party	Riding	First elected / previously elected
Earle Rafuse	Liberal	Annapolis East	1988
Greg Kerr	Progressive Conservative	Annapolis West	1978
J. William Gillis	Liberal	Antigonish	1970
Neil LeBlanc	Progressive Conservative	Argyle	1984
Kenneth Streatch	Progressive Conservative	Bedford - Musquodoboit Valley	1978
Wayne Connors	Liberal	Cape Breton Centre	1988
Russell MacNeil (1989)	Liberal	Cape Breton Centre	1989
John MacEachern	Liberal	Cape Breton East	1988
Brian Young	Progressive Conservative	Cape Breton North	1981
Paul MacEwan	Independent	Cape Breton Nova	1970 (Note: First elected as a New Democrat)
Paul MacEwan	Liberal	Cape Breton Nova	1970
Vincent J. MacLean	Liberal	Cape Breton South	1974
Bernie Boudreau	Liberal	Cape Breton The Lakes	1988
Russell MacKinnon	Liberal	Cape Breton West	1988
Guy LeBlanc	Progressive Conservative	Clare	1984
Ed Lorraine	Liberal	Colchester North	1981, 1988
R. Collin Stewart	Progressive Conservative	Colchester South	1978
David Nantes	Progressive Conservative	Cole Harbour	1978
Guy Brown	Liberal	Cumberland Centre	1974
Roger Stuart Bacon	Progressive Conservative	Cumberland East	1970
Ross Bragg	Liberal	Cumberland West	1988
Jim Smith	Liberal	Dartmouth East	1984
Sandy Jolly	Liberal	Dartmouth North	1988
Roland J. Thornhill	Progressive Conservative	Dartmouth South	1974
Roland J. Thornhill	Independent	Dartmouth South	1974
Roland J. Thornhill	Progressive Conservative	Dartmouth South	1974
Joe Casey	Liberal	Digby	1970, 1988
Chuck MacNeil	Progressive Conservative	Guysborough	1984
John M. Buchanan	Progressive Conservative	Halifax Atlantic	1967
Robert Chisholm (1991)	NDP	Halifax Atlantic	1991
Joel Matheson	Progressive Conservative	Halifax Bedford Basin	1978
Alexa McDonough	NDP	Halifax Chebucto	1981
Arthur R. Donahoe †	Progressive Conservative	Halifax Citadel	1978
Terence R. B. Donahoe	Progressive Conservative	Halifax Cornwallis	1978
Tom McInnis	Progressive Conservative	Halifax Eastern Shore	1978
Gerry O'Malley	Liberal	Halifax Needham	1988
Jerry Lawrence	Progressive Conservative	Halifax St. Margarets	1978
Jack Hawkins	Liberal	Hants East	1970, 1981, 1988
Ron Russell †	Progressive Conservative	Hants West	1978
Charles MacArthur	Liberal	Inverness North	1988
Danny Graham	Liberal	Inverness South	1988
George Archibald	Progressive Conservative	Kings North	1984
Derrick Kimball	Progressive Conservative	Kings South	1988
Derrick Kimball	Independent	Kings South	1988
George Moody	Progressive Conservative	Kings West	1978
Al Mosher	Progressive Conservative	Lunenburg Centre	1988
Jim Barkhouse	Liberal	Lunenburg East	1984
Marie P. Dechman	Progressive Conservative	Lunenburg West	1988
Jack MacIsaac	Progressive Conservative	Pictou Centre	1977
Donald W. Cameron	Progressive Conservative	Pictou East	1974
Donald P. McInnes	Progressive Conservative	Pictou West	1978
John Leefe	Progressive Conservative	Queens	1978
Richard Mann	Liberal	Richmond	1988
John Holm	NDP	Sackville	1984
Harold Huskilson	Liberal	Shelburne	1970
Ron Giffin	Progressive Conservative	Truro-Bible Hill	1978
Kennie MacAskill	Liberal	Victoria	1988
Leroy Legere	Progressive Conservative	Yarmouth	1988

† denotes the speaker. Ron Russell became speaker in 1991.

== Former members of the 55th General Assembly ==
Name	Party	Electoral District	Cause of departure	Succeeded by	Elected
Wayne Connors	Liberal	Cape Breton Centre	resigned	Russell MacNeil, Liberal	August 22, 1989
John M. Buchanan	Progressive Conservative	Halifax Atlantic	named to Senate of Canada	Robert Chisholm, NDP	August 22, 1991

== Notes ==
Preceded by 54th General Assembly of Nova Scotia	General Assemblies of Nova Scotia; 1988–1993	Succeeded by 56th General Assembly of Nova Scotia
