= James MacDonald (Canadian politician) =

Canadian politician from Nova Scotia (1849-1916

Member of the Nova Scotia House of Assembly for Inverness County
- In office April 20, 1897 – March 2, 1916

Personal details
- Born: November 29, 1849 Whycocomagh, Nova Scotia
- Died: March 2, 1916 (aged 66) West Bay, Nova Scotia
- Party: Liberal
- Spouse: Margaret Walsh ()
- Occupation: merchant, politician

James MacDonald (November 29, 1849 – March 2, 1916) was a merchant, and political figure in Nova Scotia, Canada. He represented Inverness County in the Nova Scotia House of Assembly from 1897 to 1916 as a Liberal member. MacDonald died in 1916 in West Bay, Nova Scotia. He was elected in the 1897, 1901, 1906, and the 1911 Nova Scotia general election, until his death in office.
