= William N. MacLean =

Canadian politician

MLA for Inverness
- In office 1962–1970
- Preceded by: Roderick MacLean
- Succeeded by: John Archie MacKenzie

Personal details
- Born: March 27, 1907 Inverness, Nova Scotia
- Died: August 4, 1997 (aged 90) Inverness, Nova Scotia
- Party: Nova Scotia Liberal Party
- Occupation: businessman

William Nicholson MacLean (March 27, 1907 – August 4, 1997) was a Canadian politician. He represented the electoral district of Inverness in the Nova Scotia House of Assembly from 1962 to 1970. He was a member of the Nova Scotia Liberal Party.

Born in 1907 at Inverness, Nova Scotia, MacLean was a businessman. He married Jane Roberts in 1939. From 1933 to 1945, he was the chief of police for Inverness. He also served a term as mayor of Inverness. MacLean entered provincial politics in a 1962 byelection, winning the seat left vacant following the death of his brother, Roderick MacLean. He was re-elected in the 1963, and 1967 elections, representing the dual-member riding with Progressive Conservative Jim MacLean. In the 1970 election, MacLean was defeated for the second seat by fellow Liberal John Archie MacKenzie. MacLean died at Inverness on August 4, 1997.
