= Hugh John MacDonald (Alberta politician) =

There are two Alberta politicians named Hugh John MacDonald:

- Hugh John MacDonald (Calgary MLA) (1911–1998), member of the Legislative Assembly of Alberta for Calgary, 1948–1959
- Hugh John Macdonald (Edmonton politician) (1898–1965), Edmonton civic politician and member of the Legislative Assembly of Alberta for Edmonton, 1940–1944

== See also ==
- Hugh MacDonald
