= William McLean =

William McLean may refer to:

- William B. McLean (politician), member of the Illinois House of Representatives, 1820–1822
- William McLean (Ohio politician) (1794–1839), U.S. representative from Ohio
- William P. McLean (1836–1925), U.S. representative from Texas
- William McLean (New Zealand politician) (1845–1914), New Zealand politician
- William Campbell McLean (1854–1944), justice of the Supreme Court of Mississippi
- William H. McLean (1871–1943), American architect
- Sir William McLean (civil servant) (1877–1967), British engineer, colonial civil servant and politician
- William B. McLean (1914–1976), U.S. Navy physicist and ordnance expert
  - USNS William McLean, a 2011 U.S. Navy cargo ship named for the physicist
- Bill McLean (1918–1996), Australian soldier and rugby player
- William McLean (bobsleigh) (1918–1963), British bobsledder who competed at the 1948 Winter Olympics in St. Moritz
- Bill McLean (trade unionist) (1919–1977), Scottish trade unionist

== See also ==
- Willie McLean (disambiguation)
- Billy McLean (disambiguation)
- Will McLean (1919–1990), American folk singer and songwriter
- William MacLean (disambiguation)
- William McClean (1842–?), Barbadian cricketer
- William McLean Hamilton (1919–1989), Canadian politician
- William McLane (disambiguation)
