= Charles McMillan =

Charles McMillan may refer to:

- Charles F. McMillan (1954–2024), American nuclear physicist
- Charles Edward McMillan (1865–1925), physician, surgeon, and political figure in Nova Scotia, Canada
- Charlie McMillan (1887–1911), Australian rules footballer

== See also ==
- Charles Macmillan (1872–1941), New Zealand politician
