= John Bourinot =

John Bourinot may refer to:

- John C. Bourinot (1864–1929), politician in Nova Scotia, Canada
- John George Bourinot (elder) (1814–1884), Canadian politician
- John George Bourinot (younger) (1836–1902), his son, Canadian journalist, historian and civil servant
