= Charles MacArthur (politician) =

Canadian politician (1920–2010)

MLA for Inverness
- In office 1993–1998
- Preceded by: re-established riding
- Succeeded by: Charlie MacDonald

MLA for Inverness North
- In office 1988–1993
- Preceded by: Jim MacLean
- Succeeded by: riding dissolved

Personal details
- Born: December 27, 1920 Inverness, Nova Scotia
- Died: February 24, 2010 (aged 89) Inverness, Nova Scotia
- Party: Liberal

Charles MacArthur (December 27, 1920 – February 24, 2010) was a Canadian politician. He represented the electoral districts of Inverness North and Inverness in the Nova Scotia House of Assembly from 1988 to 1998. He was a member of the Nova Scotia Liberal Party.

Born in 1920 at Inverness, Nova Scotia, MacArthur was a municipal councillor for 18 years and served as Warden of Inverness County. He entered provincial politics in the 1988 election, defeating Progressive Conservative incumbent Jim MacLean by 801 votes in the Inverness North riding. In 1993, MacArthur defeated Inverness South MLA Danny Graham for the Liberal nomination in the re-established Inverness riding, after their ridings were eliminated through redistribution. In the 1993 election, MacArthur was re-elected, defeating his closest opponent by 2860 votes. He did not reoffer in the 1998 election. MacArthur died in Inverness on February 24, 2010.
