= Billy McLean =

Billy McLean may refer to:

- Billy McLean (umpire) (1835–1927), English-born American baseball umpire
- Billy McLean (politician) (1918–1986), British Army officer and politician
- Billy McLean (field hockey), British and Scottish field hockey player

== See also ==
- William McLean (disambiguation)
- Billy Joe MacLean (1936–2025), Canadian politician
- Billy McClain (1866–1950), African-American acrobat, comedian and actor
