= Rodney MacDonald =

Premier of Nova Scotia from 2006 to 2009

The Honourable Rodney MacDonald ECNS
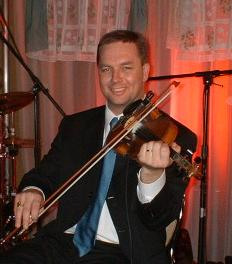
- MacDonald in 2006

26th Premier of Nova Scotia
- In office February 24, 2006 – June 19, 2009
- Monarch: Elizabeth II
- Lieutenant Governor: Myra Freeman; Mayann Francis
- Preceded by: John Hamm
- Succeeded by: Darrell Dexter

Member of the Nova Scotia House of Assembly for Inverness
- In office July 27, 1999 – September 10, 2009
- Preceded by: Charlie MacDonald
- Succeeded by: Allan MacMaster

Personal details
- Born: Rodney Joseph MacDonald; January 2, 1972 (age 54) Inverness, Nova Scotia, Canada
- Party: Progressive Conservative

Rodney Joseph MacDonald (born January 2, 1972) is a Canadian politician, educator and musician who served as the 26th premier of Nova Scotia from 2006 to 2009 and as MLA for the riding of Inverness in the Nova Scotia House of Assembly from 1999 to 2009.

== Background ==
MacDonald was born in Inverness, Nova Scotia but spent his formative years in the community of Mabou, Cape Breton, Nova Scotia. In his youth, he was active in sports, including hockey, baseball and track and field. He played Midget AAA, Junior and Senior Hockey. In later years he coached various levels. He graduated from Mabou Consolidated School in 1990 and from St. Francis Xavier University in 1994, receiving a Bachelor of Science in Physical Education with a minor in English and a Nova Scotia Teaching Licence.

He was employed as a senior high teacher with the Strait Regional School Board and was actively engaged in many community groups. At the age of 27, he became one of the youngest elected MLAs in Nova Scotia's history and went on to hold a number of high-profile Cabinet positions within the Nova Scotia government. At the age of 34 he became Nova Scotia's 26th Premier. He balanced Nova Scotia's budget each year of his term, lowered the Provincial debt, reduced taxes, and invested in key areas of the province's economy. MacDonald is engaged in numerous areas of Nova Scotia's economy: Business Development, the Offshore Petroleum Board of Nova Scotia, and in higher education as the CEO of The Gaelic College/Colaisde na Gaidhlig.

== Music career ==
MacDonald has toured his fiddle music throughout Atlantic Canada, Central Canada and the northeastern United States. He is also an accomplished step dancer; he began dancing at age four after learning the skill from his parents. MacDonald's first public performance was reportedly at age eight at the Mayflower Shopping Mall in Sydney and he began taking fiddle lessons from his uncle, Kinnon Beaton, at age 12. He has recorded two albums to date: Dancer's Delight (1995) and Traditionally Rockin' (1997, with his cousin Glenn Graham). In 1998 he received two nominations for the East Coast Music Awards. MacDonald was also included on the 2004 Smithsonian release The Beaton Family of Mabou: Cape Breton Fiddle and Piano Music and numerous other compilations.

== Political career ==
MacDonald was first elected to the Legislative Assembly of Nova Scotia in the 1999 provincial election, representing the riding of Inverness in western Cape Breton Island. He was re-elected in 2003. He served in Premier John Hamm's cabinet with various ministerial portfolios including Tourism, Culture & Heritage, Health Promotion, and Immigration. He was responsible for the Heritage Property Act, Nova Scotia Liquor Corporation Act, and the Nova Scotia Youth Secretariat.

Following Hamm's September 2005 announcement of his intention to retire, MacDonald committed to running for the leadership of the Progressive Conservative Association of Nova Scotia. The leadership race culminated in MacDonald winning the party's leadership on a second ballot on February 11, 2006. He was sworn in as Premier of Nova Scotia on February 24, succeeding Hamm. He is the second youngest premier in Nova Scotia's history.

In May 2006, after a short session, MacDonald dissolved the legislature, calling an election for June 13, 2006. MacDonald's Progressive Conservatives won a minority government in the 2006 general election and MacDonald retained his seat.

On May 4, 2009, MacDonald's government lost a confidence vote; as a result, a provincial election was called for June 9, 2009 to elect the next government. Although MacDonald kept his seat in the riding of Inverness, the Progressive Conservatives lost the election to the Nova Scotia New Democratic Party, led by Darrell Dexter.

MacDonald stepped down as Nova Scotia PC Leader on June 24, 2009. He announced on August 5, 2009, that he would be resigning his seat in the legislature before the fall session began. He officially resigned on September 10, 2009.

== Life after politics ==
After resigning as the MLA for Inverness, MacDonald founded a business development and consulting business called RMD Development Incorporated. In June 2010, MacDonald was appointed to the Canada-Nova Scotia Offshore Petroleum Board.

Since September 2011, MacDonald has been the President of The Gaelic College (Colaisde na Gàidhlig) in St. Anns. He is also President of Beinn Mhàbu, a satellite campus of The Gaelic College in Mabou focused on Gaelic language and cultural education. He was involved in the development of the campus, helping to conceptualize the project and support its establishment. He also created a Cape Breton Island-wide festival, "KitchenFest", which annually features more than 70 shows and more than 100 musicians. The college focuses on Gaelic language, music, culture, dance and craft. The college teaches multiple disciplines and cultural experiences to thousands of visitors and students each year. It is associated with Cape Breton University through a Memorandum of Understanding. In 2015, he was in the public eye when he condemned the provincial government's proposed cutting of the Gaelic Affairs Department budget by 40%.

In 2022, MacDonald worked as a community liaison on behalf of Cabot Cape Breton, in relation to a proposed development at West Mabou Provincial Park to lease one-third of the 215 hectares of land belonging to West Mabou Provincial Park to develop the company's third golf course. West Mabou Provincial Park is protected under the Provincial Parks Act and contains 17 rare and endangered animals and plants. MacDonald argued the purchase of the protected area would bring increased tourism and jobs to the Mabou area, but faced some local opposition from community members, politicians, and scientists who were concerned development on the beach would destroy habitat, become inaccessible to residents, and contribute additional stress to the post-COVID housing crisis present in the area. On April 20, 2023, Tory Rushton, Minister of Natural Resources and Renewables, announced that the provincial government would not consider Cabot Group's proposal to develop within the park and would reject a proposal if one was submitted to cabinet.
