= James Adam Proudfoot =

Canadian politician (1876–1949)

Member of the Nova Scotia House of Assembly for Inverness County
- In office October 1, 1928 – August 21, 1933

Personal details
- Born: January 8, 1876 Salt Springs, Nova Scotia
- Died: March 3, 1949 (aged 73) Inverness, Nova Scotia
- Party: Liberal
- Spouse: Harriet Gordon McKay ()
- Education: Dalhousie University
- Occupation: physician, surgeon, politician

James Adam Proudfoot (January 8, 1876 – March 3, 1949) was a physician, surgeon, and political figure in Nova Scotia, Canada. He represented Inverness County in the Nova Scotia House of Assembly from 1928 to 1933 as a Liberal member. He was elected in the 1928 Nova Scotia general election.
