= 53rd Nova Scotia general election =

The 53rd Nova Scotia general election may refer to

- the 1981 Nova Scotia general election, the 52nd overall general election for Nova Scotia, for the (due to a counting error in 1859) 53rd General Assembly of Nova Scotia, or
- the 1984 Nova Scotia general election, the 53rd overall general election for Nova Scotia, for the 54th General Assembly of Nova Scotia, but considered the 31st general election for the Canadian province of Nova Scotia.
