= Malcolm McKay (politician) =

Canadian politician

Member of the Nova Scotia House of Assembly for Inverness County
- In office 1925–1928

Personal details
- Born: January 3, 1873 Inverness County, Nova Scotia
- Died: December 11, 1928 (aged 55) Whycocomagh, Nova Scotia
- Party: Liberal-Conservative

Malcolm McKay (January 3, 1873 – December 11, 1928) was a Canadian politician. He represented the electoral district of Inverness County in the Nova Scotia House of Assembly from 1925 to 1928. He was a Liberal-Conservative member.

Born in 1873 in Inverness County, Nova Scotia, McKay was a businessman. He was elected in the 1925 election, and defeated when he ran for re-election in 1928. McKay died on December 11, 1928, at Whycocomagh, Inverness County.
