= Alexander H. McKinnon =

Canadian politician

The Honourable Alexander H. McKinnon

18th Chief Justice of Nova Scotia
- In office 1968–1973
- Preceded by: Lauchlin Daniel Currie
- Succeeded by: Ian Malcolm MacKeigan

MLA for Inverness
- In office 1940–1953
- Preceded by: Moses Elijah McGarry
- Succeeded by: Joseph Clyde Nunn

Personal details
- Born: December 24, 1904 Inverness, Nova Scotia
- Died: June 16, 1973 (aged 68) Halifax, Nova Scotia
- Party: Nova Scotia Liberal Party
- Occupation: judge

Alexander Hugh McKinnon (December 24, 1904 – June 16, 1973) was a lawyer, judge and politician in Nova Scotia, Canada. He represented Inverness in the Nova Scotia House of Assembly from 1940 to 1953 as a Liberal member.

He was born in Inverness, Nova Scotia, the son of Hugh McKinnon and Margaret Campbell. McKinnon was educated in Inverness and then at St. Francis Xavier University and Dalhousie University, receiving a LL.B. from the later institution in 1929. He was admitted to the bar in the same year and set up practice in Inverness. In 1934, he married Ann Ryan. He was first elected to the provincial assembly in a 1940 by-election held after Moses Elijah McGarry was elected to the House of Commons. McKinnon served in the province's Executive Council as Minister of Public Health and Welfare from 1949 to 1950 and Minister of Mines and Labour from 1949 to 1953. He was named a county court judge for Antigonish County in 1953 and, in 1966, was appointed to the Nova Scotia Supreme Court. He was named Chief Justice for Nova Scotia in 1968 and served until his death in Halifax at the age of 68.
