= Charles Edward McMillan =

Canadian politician from Nova Scotia (1865-1925)

Member of the Nova Scotia House of Assembly for Inverness County
- In office June 20, 1906 – June 13, 1911

Personal details
- Born: 1865 Whycocomagh, Nova Scotia
- Died: 1925 (aged 59–60) Inverness, Nova Scotia
- Party: Liberal Conservative
- Spouse: Lila MacDougall
- Education: Dalhousie University
- Occupation: physician, surgeon, politician

Charles Edward McMillan (1865 – October 26, 1925) was a physician, surgeon, and political figure in Nova Scotia, Canada. He represented Inverness County in the Nova Scotia House of Assembly from 1906 to 1911 as a Liberal Conservative member. He was elected in the 1906 Nova Scotia general election and was unsuccessful in the 1901 and 1911 elections.
