= Hugh McDonald =

Hugh McDonald may refer to:

- Hugh McDonald (Australian musician) (1954–2016), Australian musician
- Hugh McDonald (politician, born 1841), Canadian politician
- Hugh McDonald (politician, born 1827) (1827–1899), member of the 1st Canadian Parliament
- Hugh McDonald (American musician) (born 1950), American bass guitarist
- Hugh McDonald (footballer) (1884–1920), Scottish football goalkeeper
- Hugh Lord McDonald (1841–1890), contractor and political figure in Prince Edward Island

== See also ==
- Hugh MacDonald (disambiguation)
