= John H. Jamieson =

Canadian politician from Nova Scotia (?-1906/1907)

Member of the Nova Scotia House of Assembly for Inverness County
- In office March 15, 1894 – April 19, 1897

Personal details
- Party: Liberal Conservative, Conservative
- Spouse: Lila MacDougall
- Occupation: teacher, barrister, politician

John H. Jamieson (unknown – 1906/1907) was a teacher, barrister, and political figure in Nova Scotia, Canada. He represented Inverness County in the Nova Scotia House of Assembly from 1894 to 1897 as a Liberal Conservative member. He read law under former parliamentarian Samuel McDonnell. He was elected in the 1894 Nova Scotia general election and was unsuccessful in the 1897 election. He was an unsuccessful candidate in the 1904 Canadian federal election in Inverness as a Conservative.
