= John McKinnon (Nova Scotia politician, born 1832) =

Canadian politician

John McKinnon (July 14, 1832 – 13 August 1907) was a farmer, trader and political figure in Nova Scotia, Canada. He represented Inverness County in the Nova Scotia House of Assembly from 1874 to 1878 and from 1886 to 1894 as a Liberal member.

He was born in Whycocomagh, Nova Scotia, the son of Laughlin McKinnon, a Scottish immigrant, and Annie McLean. He was educated in Halifax. McKinnon married Harriet McQueen. He served as a member of the province's Executive Council from 1875 to 1878. McKinnon ran for reelection unsuccessfully in 1878 and 1882.
