= William McLane =

William McLane may refer to:

- William McLane (Washington politician) (1819–1906), Olympia area pioneer and member of the Washington Territorial Legislature
- William McLane (Pennsylvania politician) (1947–2010), member of the Pennsylvania House of Representatives

== See also ==
- William McLean (disambiguation)
