= Donald MacLennan =

Canadian politician

Donald MacLennan (March 22, 1875 – October 19, 1953) was a lawyer and political figure in Nova Scotia, Canada. He represented Inverness County in the Nova Scotia House of Assembly from 1911 to 1925 and then Inverness—Richmond in the House of Commons of Canada from 1935 to 1940 as a Liberal member. MacLennan sat for Margaree Forks division in the Senate of Canada from 1940 to 1953.

He was born in Margaree, Nova Scotia, the son of Donald MacLennan and Flora MacDonald. MacLennan was educated at Saint Francis Xavier College. He received a Bachelor of Laws degree from Dalhousie University in 1905. In the same year, he married Mathilda McDaniel. He was called to the bar in the following year and set up practice at Port Hood. MacLennan was president of the Eastern Journal Publishing Company. He served on the municipal council for Port Hood in 1907 and was named treasurer for Inverness County in 1910. MacLennan ran unsuccessfully for a seat in the House of Commons in 1926, but was elected in 1935. He was called to the Senate on January 29, 1940, and remained in that position until his death at the age of 76.
