= Inverness North =

Former provincial electoral district in Nova Scotia, Canada

Nova Scotia electoral district

Defunct provincial electoral district
- Legislature: Nova Scotia House of Assembly
- District created: 1981
- District abolished: 1993
- Last contested: 1988

Inverness North was a provincial electoral district in Nova Scotia, Canada, that elected one member to the Nova Scotia House of Assembly. It was formed in 1981 when the former district of Inverness County was divided into Inverness North and Inverness South. It existed until 1993, when the boundaries were reformed to create the current provincial district of Inverness and the former district of Victoria.

== Members of the Legislative Assembly ==
Inverness North
Legislature	Years	Member	Party
District created from Inverness County (1867–1981)
53rd	1981–1984	John Archie MacKenzie	Liberal
54th	1984–1988	Norman J. MacLean	Progressive Conservative
55th	1988–1993	Charles MacArthur	Liberal
District dissolved into Inverness (1993–Present) and Victoria (1993–2003)

== Election results ==
=== 1988 ===
1988 Nova Scotia general election
Party	Candidate	Votes	%	±%
Liberal	Charles MacArthur	3,666	46.27	+4.19
Progressive Conservative	Norman J. MacLean	2,865	36.16	-9.41
New Democratic	Ben Boucher	1,392	17.57	+5.60
Total valid votes		7,923	99.40	
Total rejected ballots		48	0.60	+0.20
Turnout		7,971	87.10	+4.42
Eligible voters		9,152		
Liberal gain from Progressive Conservative		Swing		+6.80
Source(s) Source: Nova Scotia Legislature (2024). "Electoral History for Inverness North" (PDF). nslegislature.ca. Nova Scotia, Chief Electoral Officer (1988). Returns of the General Election for the House of Assembly, Thirty-Second General Election (PDF) (Report). Queen's Printer. Archived from the original (PDF) on 7 July 2018.

=== 1984 ===
1984 Nova Scotia general election
Party	Candidate	Votes	%	±%
Progressive Conservative	Norman J. MacLean	3,475	45.57	+3.40
Liberal	John Archie MacKenzie	3,209	42.08	-8.23
New Democratic	Ben Boucher	913	11.97	+4.45
Labor	Nancy Thomas	29	0.38	–
Total valid votes		7,626	99.60	
Total rejected ballots		31	0.40	-0.48
Turnout		7,657	82.68	-1.33
Eligible voters		9,261		
Progressive Conservative gain from Liberal		Swing		+5.81
Source(s) Source: Nova Scotia Legislature (2024). "Electoral History for Inverness North" (PDF). nslegislature.ca. Nova Scotia, Chief Electoral Officer (1984). Returns of the General Election for the House of Assembly, Thirty-First General Election (PDF) (Report). Queen's Printer. Archived from the original (PDF) on 31 July 2017.

=== 1981 ===
1981 Nova Scotia general election
Party	Candidate	Votes	%
Liberal	John Archie MacKenzie	3,770	50.31
Progressive Conservative	Daniel Rankin	3,160	42.17
New Democratic	Eleanor Joyce Gillis	564	7.53
Total valid votes		7,494	99.11
Total rejected ballots		67	0.89
Turnout		7,561	0.89
Eligible voters		9,000	
Source(s) Source: Nova Scotia Legislature (2024). "Electoral History for Inverness North" (PDF). nslegislature.ca. Nova Scotia, Chief Electoral Officer (1981). Returns of the General Election for the House of Assembly, Thirtieth General Election (PDF) (Report). Queen's Printer. Archived from the original (PDF) on 31 July 2017.

== See also ==
- List of Nova Scotia provincial electoral districts
- Canadian provincial electoral districts
