= Willie McLean =

Willie McLean may refer to:

- Willie McLean (soccer, born 1904) (1904–1977), Scottish-born American international soccer player
- Willie McLean (footballer, born 1935) (born 1935), Scottish football player and manager
- Willie McLean (rugby league) (born 1973), New Zealand rugby league player

== See also ==
- William McLean (disambiguation)
