= Hubert Meen Aucoin =

Canadian politician

Hubert Meen Aucoin (December 17, 1874 – January 29, 1952) was a merchant and political figure in Nova Scotia, Canada. He represented Inverness County in the Nova Scotia House of Assembly from 1925 to 1928 as a Liberal-Conservative member.

He was born in Chéticamp, Nova Scotia, the son of Anselm Aucoin and Hélène Daigle. In 1899, he married Luce Arsenault. Aucoin died in Halifax on January 29, 1952.
