= Daniel McNeil =

Canadian politician

Daniel McNeil (January 31, 1853 – 16 November 1918) was a lawyer, judge and political figure in Nova Scotia, Canada. He represented Inverness County in the Nova Scotia House of Assembly from 1886 to 1894 as a Liberal member.

He was born in Mabou, Nova Scotia, the son of Malcolm McNeil and Ellen Meagher, and was educated at Saint Francis Xavier College. In 1879, he was called to the Nova Scotia Bar and set up practice in Port Hood. McNeil married Ellen Maria McDonald in 1881. He was a member of the Executive Council from 1886 to 1893. In 1892, he moved his law practice to Halifax. McNeil returned to Inverness County in 1905, serving as postmaster. In 1907, he was named King's Counsel. McNeil was later named judge in the County Court; he died shortly afterwards following an accidental injury.
