= Inverness South =

Former provincial electoral district in Nova Scotia, Canada

Nova Scotia electoral district

Defunct provincial electoral district
- Legislature: Nova Scotia House of Assembly
- District created: 1981
- District abolished: 1993
- Last contested: 1988

Inverness South was a provincial electoral district in Nova Scotia, Canada, that elected one member of the Nova Scotia House of Assembly. It was formed in 1981 when the former district of Inverness County was divided into Inverness North and Inverness South. It existed until 1993, when the boundaries were reformed to create the current provincial district of Inverness and the former district of Guysborough–Eastern Shore–Tracadie.

== Members of the Legislative Assembly ==
Inverness South elected the following members of the Legislative Assembly:

Inverness South
Legislature	Years	Member	Party
District created from Inverness County (1867–1981)
53rd	1981–1984	Billy Joe MacLean	Progressive Conservative
54th	1984–1987	Billy Joe MacLean	Progressive Conservative
54th	1987–1988	Billy Joe MacLean	Independent
55th	1988–1993	Danny Graham	Liberal
District dissolved into Inverness (1993–Present) and Guysborough–Port Hawkesbury (1993–2003)

== Election results ==
=== 1988 ===
1988 Nova Scotia general election
Party	Candidate	Votes	%	±%
Liberal	Danny Graham	2,185	40.03%	2.94%
Independent	Billy Joe MacLean	2,062	37.78%	-2.32%
Progressive Conservative	Archie MacLachlan	866	15.87%	1.18%
New Democratic	Martin Beaton	345	6.32%	-1.80%
Total		5,458	–	
Source(s) Source: Nova Scotia Legislature (2024). "Electoral History for Inverness South" (PDF). nslegislature.ca. Nova Scotia, Chief Electoral Officer (1988). Returns of the General Election for the House of Assembly, Thirty-Second General Election (PDF) (Report). Queen's Printer. Archived from the original (PDF) on 7 July 2018.

=== 1987 ===
Nova Scotia provincial by-election, February 24, 1987 Expulsion of Billy Joe MacLean from the House.
Party	Candidate	Votes	%	±%
Independent	Billy Joe MacLean	2,203	40.10%	–
Liberal	Allan MacDonald	2,038	37.10%	4.27%
Progressive Conservative	Mary Margaret MacLean	807	14.69%	-47.21%
New Democratic	Martin Beaton	446	8.12%	3.47%
Total		5,494	–	
Source(s) Source: Nova Scotia Legislature (2024). "Electoral History for Inverness South" (PDF). nslegislature.ca.

=== 1984 ===
1984 Nova Scotia general election
Party	Candidate	Votes	%	±%
Progressive Conservative	Billy Joe MacLean	3,273	61.89%	15.07%
Liberal	Danny Graham	1,736	32.83%	-12.82%
New Democratic	Al MacKinnon	246	4.65%	-2.88%
Labour	Laddie Golemiec	33	0.62%	–
Total		5,288	–	
Source(s) Source: Nova Scotia Legislature (2024). "Electoral History for Inverness South" (PDF). nslegislature.ca. Nova Scotia, Chief Electoral Officer (1984). Returns of the General Election for the House of Assembly, Thirty-First General Election (PDF) (Report). Queen's Printer. Archived from the original (PDF) on 31 July 2017.

=== 1981 ===
1981 Nova Scotia general election
Party	Candidate	Votes	%	±%
Progressive Conservative	Billy Joe MacLean	2,469	46.82%	–
Liberal	William MacEachern	2,407	45.65%	–
New Democratic	Bill Martin	397	7.53%	–
Total		5,273	–	
Source(s) Source: Nova Scotia Legislature (2024). "Electoral History for Inverness South" (PDF). nslegislature.ca. Nova Scotia, Chief Electoral Officer (1981). Returns of the General Election for the House of Assembly, Thirtieth General Election (PDF) (Report). Queen's Printer. Archived from the original (PDF) on 31 July 2017.

== See also ==
- List of Nova Scotia provincial electoral districts
- Canadian provincial electoral districts
