= Allan MacMaster =

Canadian politician (born 1974)

The Honourable Allan MacMaster ECNS
- MacMaster in 2009

Deputy Premier of Nova Scotia
- In office August 31, 2021 – October 24, 2024
- Premier: Tim Houston
- Preceded by: Kelly Regan
- Succeeded by: Tim Halman

Member of the Nova Scotia House of Assembly for Inverness
- In office October 20, 2009 – October 27, 2024
- Preceded by: Rodney MacDonald
- Succeeded by: Kyle MacQuarrie

Personal details
- Born: September 26, 1974 (age 52) Judique, Nova Scotia
- Party: Progressive Conservative (provincial); Conservative (federal)

Allan Gerard MacMaster (born September 26, 1974) is a Canadian politician. He represented the electoral district of Inverness in the Nova Scotia House of Assembly as a member of the Progressive Conservative Party.

== Early life and career ==
He is the son of Marie and Hugh Alan "Buddy" MacMaster, and grew up in Judique in Inverness County. He graduated from St. Francis Xavier University with a degree in business administration.

Prior to being elected, MacMaster worked as an investment advisor with BMO Nesbitt Burns, and authored a monthly column for the Nova Scotia Business Journal entitled "Building Your Wealth". He also worked as an Executive Assistant to the former Premier, cabinet minister, and MLA for Inverness, Rodney MacDonald from 1999 to 2009.

MacMaster was first elected to the Nova Scotia House of Assembly in a by-election on October 20, 2009. He served as Chair of the Public Accounts Committee from 2009 to 2018, acting as Chair of the committee from 2013 to 2018.

In March 2010, MacMaster issued a rare Gaelic resolution in the Nova Scotia House of Assembly, asking for continued government support for Gaelic language, history and culture in Nova Scotia. It was passed unanimously by all members.

In his first full session in the legislature, MacMaster introduced two bills: An Act to Provide Greater Flexibility for Nova Scotians' Retirement Savings in Locked-in Accounts and An Act to Amend Chapter 31 of the Acts of 1996, the Sales Tax Act which would prohibit the province from proposing or agreeing to an increase in the provincial portion of the federally enacted harmonized sales tax.

In 2012, he brought the idea forward to extend pension wind up for Newpage pension plans during debate on Bill 96 Pension Benefits Act in 2011, but this was voted down. A new bill was created for the same purpose and passed.

Since 2013, he has been an advocate for patient safety and the access to a CT scanner at the Inverness hospital, and a voice for those opposing the "Royal" designation of the Gaelic College in Cape Breton.

In October 2014, MacMaster delivered a speech in the legislature about the struggles faced by victims of sexual abuse.

MacMaster was re-elected in the 2013 election, the 2017 election and again in the 2021 election. He was appointed Deputy Premier, Minister of Finance and Treasury Board, Gaelic Affairs and Labour Relations on August 31, 2021.

On October 24, 2024, MacMaster resigned from cabinet and announced he was seeking the nomination for the Conservative Party of Canada in Cape Breton—Canso—Antigonish. When the 2024 Nova Scotia general election was called on October 27, 2024, MacMaster did not seek re-election to his provincial seat.

On February 17, 2025, MacMaster won the Conservative nomination for Cape Breton-Canso-Antigonish. He lost the election placing second.

At the time of the 2025 Canadian federal election, he lived in Troy, Nova Scotia.

== Electoral record ==
2025 Canadian federal election: Cape Breton—Canso—Antigonish
Party	Candidate	Votes	%	±%	Expenditures
Liberal	Jaime Battiste	24,908	51.59	+6.17	$109,835.33
Conservative	Allan MacMaster	20,870	43.23	+8.09	$89,508.34
New Democratic	Joanna Clark	1,930	4.00	–10.75	$1,390.95
People's	Ryan Smyth	333	0.69	–3.25	$38.05
Independent	Rebecca Wall	237	0.49	N/A	$0.00
Total valid votes/expense limit		48,278	99.43	+0.24	$127,777.04
Total rejected ballots		288	0.57	–0.24	
Turnout		48,556	75.57	+10.00	
Eligible voters		64,251			
Liberal hold		Swing		–1.24	
Source: Elections Canada

2021 Nova Scotia general election: Inverness
Party	Candidate	Votes	%	±%	Expenditures
Progressive Conservative	Allan MacMaster	4,833	55.85	-3.41	$33,264.46
Liberal	Damian MacInnis	3,112	35.96	+3.76	$42,102.76
New Democratic	Joanna Clark	708	8.18	-0.34	$21,360.60
Total valid votes/expense limit		8,653	99.38	–	$83,197.40
Total rejected ballots		54	0.62		
Turnout		8,707	60.68		
Eligible voters		14,350			
Progressive Conservative hold		Swing		-3.58	
Source: Elections Nova Scotia

2017 Nova Scotia general election
Party	Candidate	Votes	%	±%
Progressive Conservative	Allan MacMaster	4,687	61.90	
Liberal	Bobby Morris	2,347	31.00	
New Democratic Party	Michelle A. Smith	538	7.10	

2013 Nova Scotia general election
Party	Candidate	Votes	%	±%
Progressive Conservative	Allan MacMaster	3,816	49.29	
Liberal	Jackie Rankin	3,248	41.95	
New Democratic Party	Michelle A. Smith	678	8.76	

October 20, 2009 by-election
Party	Candidate	Votes	%	±%
Progressive Conservative	Allan MacMaster	3,155	35.75	-20.30
Liberal	Ian McNeil	3,105	35.18	+15.29
New Democratic Party	Bert Lewis	2,342	26.54	+5.66
Green	Nathalie Arsenault	223	2.53	-1.00
