= Charlie MacDonald (politician) =

Canadian politician

MLA for Inverness
- In office 1998–1999
- Preceded by: Charles MacArthur
- Succeeded by: Rodney MacDonald

Personal details
- Born: 1946
- Party: Liberal
- Occupation: Businessman

Charles MacDonald is a Canadian politician and businessman. He represented the electoral district of Inverness in the Nova Scotia House of Assembly from 1998 to 1999. He was a member of the Nova Scotia Liberal Party.

MacDonald is a businessman in Port Hood, Nova Scotia. He served 10 years as a municipal councillor in Inverness County before entering provincial politics. On March 7, 1998, he won the Liberal nomination for the Inverness riding, and went on to win the seat in the 1998 election. He was defeated by Progressive Conservative candidate Rodney MacDonald, when he ran for re-election in 1999.
