= Duncan J. Campbell =

Canadian politician

- Born: 1845; Margaree Forks, Nova Scotia
- Died: November 15, 1882 (aged 36–37); Port Hood, Nova Scotia
- Education: Harvard College
- Occupations: Physician, politician
- Known for: Representing Inverness County in the Nova Scotia House of Assembly
- Spouse: Elizabeth Smyth (m. 1874)
- Children: Peter Smyth Campbell

Duncan J. Campbell (1845 – November 15, 1882) was a medical doctor and political figure in Nova Scotia, Canada. He represented Inverness County in the Nova Scotia House of Assembly from 1872 to 1883 as a Conservative member.

He was born in Margaree Forks, Nova Scotia. He was the son of Samuel Campbell and Ann McDonald. Campbell was educated at Harvard College. He was first elected to the provincial assembly in an 1872 by-election held after S. McDonnell resigned from his seat. In 1874, he married Elizabeth Smyth, the daughter of Peter Smyth, who had previously sat for Inverness in the provincial assembly. Campbell died in office at Port Hood.

His son Peter Smyth Campbell later served as Deputy Minister of Health for the province.
