= Belle Cote, Nova Scotia =

Community in Nova Scotia, Canada

Coordinates: 46°26′57.16″N 61°6′6″W

Belle Cote in Nova Scotia

Belle Cote (/bɛlˈkoʊti/) is a small community in the Canadian province of Nova Scotia, located in Inverness County. It is located at the mouth of the Margaree River where it flows into the Gulf of St Lawrence. It marks the traditional boundary between the Scottish settlements to the south and the Acadian villages to the north.
