= John E. LeBrun =

Canadian politician

MLA for Richmond
- In office May 6, 1980 – 1981
- Preceded by: Gaston LeBlanc
- Succeeded by: Greg MacIsaac

Personal details
- Born: November 29, 1939 Arichat, Nova Scotia
- Died: June 23, 2005 (aged 65) Halifax, Nova Scotia
- Party: Nova Scotia Liberal Party
- Occupation: Businessman

John Edward LeBrun (November 29, 1939 – June 23, 2005) was a Canadian politician. He represented the electoral district of Richmond in the Nova Scotia House of Assembly from 1980 to 1981, winning a by-election to replace Gaston LeBlanc, who died. He was a member of the Nova Scotia Liberal Party.

== Early life and education ==
LeBrun was born in Arichat, Nova Scotia. He attended St. Francis Xavier University and later was a businessman.

== Personal life and death ==
In 1960, he married Bernadine Anne Marchand. LeBrun died in 2005.
