= Troy, Nova Scotia =

Community in Nova Scotia, Canada

Coordinates: 45°41′40.38″N 61°26′23.42″W

Troy in Nova Scotia

Troy is a small community in the Canadian province of Nova Scotia, located in Inverness County on Cape Breton Island.

The community is likely named for the ancient city of Troy.
