= Hugh MacDonald =

Hugh MacDonald may refer to:

- Hugh MacDonald (poet) (born 1945), Canadian poet
- Hugh MacDonald (vicar apostolic of the Highland District) (1699–1773), Roman Catholic bishop
- Hugh MacDonald (bishop of Aberdeen) (1841–1898), Roman Catholic bishop
- Hugh Macdonald (filmmaker) (1943–2024), New Zealand film director, nominated for an Academy Award for Animated Short Film
- Hugh MacDonald (archer) (born 1974), Canadian archer
- Hugh MacDonald (Canadian politician) (born 1955), Canadian politician
- Hugh MacDonald (Scottish politician) (1929–2013), Scottish nationalist activist
- Hugh MacDonald (journalist) (1817–1860), Scottish journalist, author and poet
- Hugh Macdonald (musicologist) (born 1940), English musicologist
- Hugh John Macdonald (1850–1929), premier of Manitoba
- Hugh John MacDonald (Calgary MLA) (1911–1998), member of the Legislative Assembly of Alberta, 1948–1959
- Hugh John Macdonald (Edmonton politician) (1898–1965), provincial politician from Alberta, Canada
- H. Ian Macdonald (born 1929), Canadian economist, civil servant, and former President of York University
- Hugh Macdonald (Australian politician) (1850–1906), member of the New South Wales Legislative Assembly

== See also ==
- Hugh McDonald (disambiguation)
