= Jotham Blanchard =

Canadian politician

Jotham Blanchard (March 15, 1800 – July 14, 1839) was a lawyer, newspaper editor, and political figure in Nova Scotia, Canada. He represented Halifax County in the Nova Scotia House of Assembly from 1830 to 1836.

He was born in Peterborough, New Hampshire, United States, and is the son of Jonathan Blanchard and Sarah Goggins. With his parents, he went to Truro, Nova Scotia in 1801. The family later settled at Pictou. Blanchard was educated at the Pictou Academy, went on to study law, and was called to the bar in 1822. He became editor of the Colonial Patriot in Pictou in 1827. In 1832, he married Margaret Spears. Near the end of his term in the assembly, Blanchard's participation was limited due to poor health and he died in Truro at the age of 39.
