= Joseph Clyde Nunn =

Canadian politician

Joseph Clyde Nunn (July 13, 1908 – December 4, 1970) was a noted broadcaster and political figure in Nova Scotia, Canada. He represented Inverness in the Nova Scotia House of Assembly from 1954 to 1963 as a Liberal member, and served as Minister of Labour and Welfare in the Henry Hicks government. Nunn was a pioneer of educational radio in Nova Scotia and was known throughout the Canadian Maritimes for his personality "The Old Timer" on his radio show "Fun at 5."

He was born in Sydney, Nova Scotia, the son of James Steven Nunn and Elizabeth Petrie. He was educated at Sydney Academy and St. Francis Xavier University. Nunn unsuccessfully ran for a seat in the House of Commons in 1940 as a National Government candidate. In 1948, he married Honorah Margaret McKenna. Nunn was a Director of the Atlantic Broadcasters Ltd, owner/operators of CJFX Radio (580 AM) in Antigonish, Nova Scotia, and served as General Manager of CJFX from its opening on March 23, 1943 until his death in December 1970. Nunn was a member of the [Canadian] National Council of Welfare, a position he held until his death. Nunn also served as President of the Antigonish Board of Trade, and was a member of the Board of Governors of Saint Francis Xavier University for over 20 years. He was first elected to the provincial assembly in a 1954 by-election held after Alexander H. McKinnon was named a county judge. He served on the province's Executive Council as Minister of Labour and Minister of Public Works. Nunn was defeated when he ran for re-election in 1963. Nunn died on December 4, 1970, after battling a long illness.
