= John C. Bourinot =

Canadian politician

John C. Bourinot (July 18, 1864 – April 12, 1929) was a dry goods merchant, newspaper owner and political figure in Nova Scotia, Canada. He represented Inverness County in the Nova Scotia House of Assembly from 1916 to 1925 as a Liberal member.

He was born in Arichat, Nova Scotia, the son of Marshall Bourinot, and was educated at the Sydney Academy. Bourinot was married twice: first to Minnie V. Hunson and then to Lottie Philpott in 1896. He was manager, owner and editor of the Eastern Journal. Bourinot served four terms as mayor of Port Hawkesbury. He was customs collector at Port Hawkesbury from 1886 to 1898. Bourinot died in Port Hawkesbury at the age of 64.
