= Moses Elijah McGarry =

Canadian politician

MLA for Inverness
- In office 1928–1940

Speaker of the Nova Scotia House of Assembly
- In office 1939–1940
- Preceded by: Lindsay C. Gardner
- Succeeded by: Gordon E. Romkey

Personal details
- Born: February 19, 1878 Harvard Lakes, Nova Scotia
- Died: June 11, 1949 (aged 71)
- Party: Liberal
- Occupation: physician

Moses Elijah McGarry (February 19, 1878 – June 11, 1949) was a physician and political figure in Nova Scotia, Canada. He represented Inverness in the Nova Scotia House of Assembly from 1928 to 1940 and Inverness—Richmond in the House of Commons of Canada from 1940 to 1949 as a Liberal member.

He was born in Harvard Lakes, Nova Scotia, the son of James McGarry and Ann Tompkins. He was educated at the Guysboro Academy and Dalhousie University. In 1903, he married Florence Irwin. McGarry was named Speaker of the House of Assembly of Nova Scotia in 1939; he resigned his seat the following year to run for a seat in the House of Commons. He died in office at the age of 71.
