= West Bay, Nova Scotia =

West Bay refers to a few different places in the Canadian province of Nova Scotia:

== Cumberland County ==
- West Bay, Cumberland County, a rural community

== Inverness County ==
- West Bay, Inverness County, an unincorporated place
- West Bay Centre, Nova Scotia
- West Bay Road, Nova Scotia
