= List of Nova Scotia provincial electoral districts =

This is a list of provincial electoral districts in Nova Scotia, Canada.

== Districts as of August 2021 ==
- Annapolis (1993–present)
- Antigonish (1867–present)
- Argyle (1981–present)
- Bedford Basin (2021–present)
- Bedford South (2021–present)
- Cape Breton Centre-Whitney Pier (2021–present)
- Cape Breton East (2021–present)
- Chester-St. Margaret's (1993–present)
- Chéticamp-Margarees-Pleasant Bay (2026–present)
- Clare (1949–present)
- Clayton Park West (2021–present)
- Colchester North (1978–present)
- Colchester-Musquodoboit Valley (1993–present)
- Cole Harbour (1978–1993) (2003–present)
- Cole Harbour-Dartmouth (2021–present)
- Cumberland North (1993–present)
- Cumberland South (1993–present)
- Dartmouth East (1978–present)
- Dartmouth North (1967–present)
- Dartmouth South (2021–present)
- Digby-Annapolis (1993–present)
- Eastern Passage (2021–present)
- Eastern Shore (1993–present)
- Fairview-Clayton Park (2021–present)
- Glace Bay-Dominion (2021–present)
- Guysborough-Tracadie (2021–present)
- Halifax Armdale (1993–present)
- Halifax Atlantic (1967–present)
- Halifax Chebucto (1933–present)
- Halifax Citadel-Sable Island (2021–present)
- Halifax Needham (1967–present)
- Hammonds Plains-Lucasville (2013–present)
- Hants East (1949–present)
- Hants West (1949–present)
- Inverness (1867–1981) (1993–present)
- Kings North (1956–present)
- Kings South (1956–present)
- Kings West (1956–present)
- Lunenburg (1867–1956) (1993–present)
- Lunenburg West (1956–present)
- Northside-Westmount (2021–present)
- Pictou Centre (1949–present)
- Pictou East (1949–present)
- Pictou West (1949–present)
- Preston (1993–present)
- Queens (1867–present)
- Richmond (1867–1925) (1933–present)
- Sackville-Cobequid (1993–present)
- Sackville-Uniacke (2021–present)
- Shelburne (1867–present)
- Sydney-Membertou (2021–present)
- Timberlea-Prospect (1993–present)
- Truro-Bible Hill-Millbrook-Salmon River (1978–present)
- Victoria-The Lakes (2003–present)
- Waverley-Fall River-Beaverbank (2003–present)
- Yarmouth (1867–present)

== Historical districts ==
=== Redistributed in 2021 ===
- Bedford (2003–2021)
- Cape Breton Centre (1925–2021)
- Cape Breton North (1933–2021)
- Cape Breton Nova (1956–2021)
- Cape Breton South (1933–2021)
- Cape Breton West (1933–2021)
- Cole Harbour-Eastern Passage (1993–2021)
- Dartmouth South-Portland Valley (2003–2021)
- Glace Bay (2003–2021)
- Guysborough-Sheet Harbour (1993–2021)
- Halifax Citadel (1933–2021)
- Halifax Clayton Park (2003–2021)

=== Redistributed in 2003 ===
- Cape Breton East (1925–2003)
- Cape Breton The Lakes (1978–2003)
- Dartmouth South (1967–2003)
- Dartmouth-Cole Harbour (1993–2003)
- Halifax Bedford Basin (1978–2003)
- Sackville-Beaver Bank (1993–2003)
- Victoria (1867–2003)

=== Redistributed in 1993 ===
- Annapolis East (1956–1993)
- Annapolis West (1956–1993)
- Colchester South (1978–1993)
- Cumberland Centre (1949–1993)
- Cumberland East (1949–1993)
- Cumberland West (1949–1993)
- Digby (1867–1993)
- Guysborough (1867–1993)
- Halifax Cornwallis (1967–1993)
- Halifax Eastern Shore (1967–1993)
- Halifax St. Margarets (1967–1993)
- Inverness North (1981–1993)
- Inverness South (1981–1993)
- Lunenburg Centre (1956–1993)
- Lunenburg East (1956–1993)
- Sackville (1978–1993)

=== Redistributed in 1978 ===
- Colchester (1867–1978)
- Halifax Cobequid (1967–1978)

=== Redistributed in 1967 ===
- Halifax Centre (1933–1967)
- Halifax County Dartmouth (1956–1967)
- Halifax East (1933–1967)
- Halifax North (1933–1967)
- Halifax Northwest (1956–1967)
- Halifax South (1933–1967)
- Halifax West (1933–1967)

=== Redistributed in 1956 ===
- Kings (1867–1956)
- Annapolis County (1867–1956)

=== Redistributed in 1949 ===
- Cumberland (1867–1949)
- Hants (1867–1949)
- Pictou (1867–1949)

=== Redistributed in 1933 ===
- Halifax (1867–1933)
- Richmond and Cape Breton West (1925–1933)

=== Redistributed in 1925 ===
- Cape Breton (1867–1925)

== See also ==
- Canadian provincial electoral districts
- List of Nova Scotia General Assemblies
