= John Archie MacKenzie =

Canadian politician

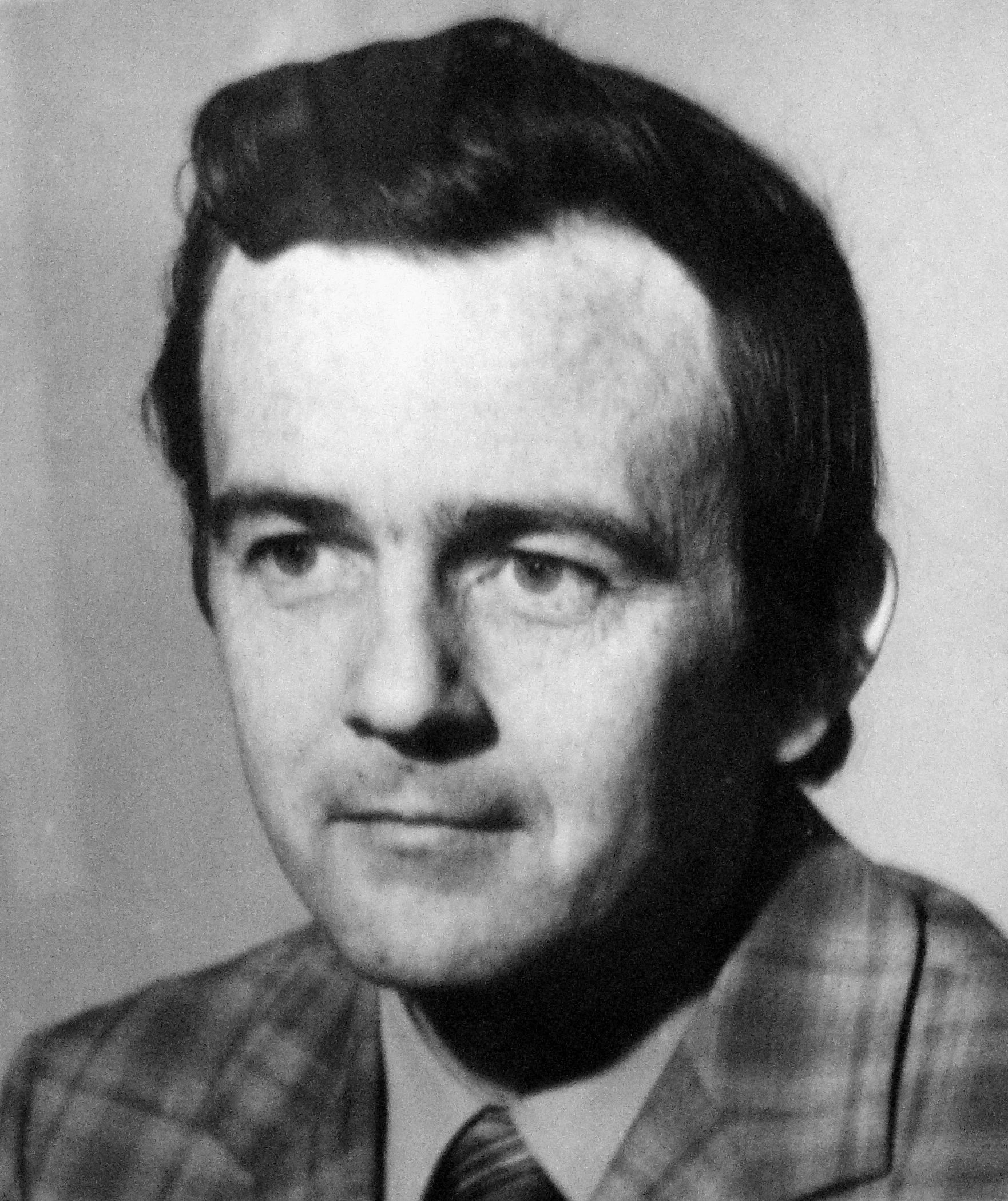
- MacKenzie, c. 1973

MLA for Inverness
- In office 1970–1981

MLA for Inverness North
- In office 1981–1984
- Preceded by: new riding
- Succeeded by: Jim MacLean

Personal details
- Born: September 12, 1934 Inverness, Nova Scotia
- Died: July 18, 2017 (aged 82) Belle Cote, Nova Scotia
- Party: Nova Scotia Liberal Party
- Occupation: Teacher

John Archie MacKenzie (September 12, 1934 — July 18, 2017) was a Canadian politician. He represented the electoral district of Inverness in the Nova Scotia House of Assembly from 1970 to 1981 and Inverness North from 1981 to 1984. He was a member of the Nova Scotia Liberal Party.

MacKenzie was born in Inverness, Nova Scotia. He attended St. Francis Xavier University and Nova Scotia Teachers College, becoming a school teacher. In 1962, he married Dorothy Agnes LeBlanc. He died at his home in Belle Cote, Nova Scotia, on July 18, 2017.
