= Hugh McDonald (MLA) =

Canadian politician from Nova Scotia (1841–1902)

Hugh MacDonald

Member of the Nova Scotia House of Assembly for Inverness County
- In office October 22, 1868 – May 15, 1871

Personal details
- Born: 1841
- Died: 1902 (aged 60–61) Mabou, Nova Scotia
- Party: Anti-Confederate; Liberal
- Occupation: postmaster, telegraph officer, politician

Hugh MacDonald (1841–1902) was a postmaster, telegraph officer, and political figure in Nova Scotia, Canada. He represented Inverness County in the Nova Scotia House of Assembly from 1868 to 1871 as an Anti-Confederate and Liberal member.

MacDonald was born in 1841 to Ronald MacDonald and Mary MacDonald. He later served as sheriff of Inverness County from April 2, 1881, until his resignation in 1902. MacDonald resided in Mabou, Nova Scotia, where he died in 1902.

He was elected in a by-election on October 22, 1868, but was unsuccessful in the 1871 Nova Scotia general election.
