= Peter Smyth =

Canadian politician

Peter Smyth (1800 – February 6, 1879) was an Irish-born merchant and politician in Nova Scotia. He represented Inverness County in the Legislative Assembly of Nova Scotia from 1847 to 1867 as a Reformer and then as a Conservative.

He was born in Dublin and came to Nova Scotia in 1817. He was married twice: first to Mary O'Grady in 1830 and then to Ellen Keating. Smyth was a fish and cattle merchant, owned at least two stores and also dealt in land. He served as a school board commissioner, road commissioner, justice of the peace and as custos rotulorum for Inverness County. Originally a Liberal, Smyth crossed the floor in 1857 to become a Conservative. He was a member of the Legislative Council of Nova Scotia from 1867 until his death in Port Hood in 1879.

A devoted Roman Catholic, Smyth donated a portion of his estate to the Diocese of Antigonish.

His daughter Elizabeth married Duncan J. Campbell.

== Historic Place ==
The Peter Smyth House stands prominently on raised ground in the north end of Port Hood, commanding an unrestricted view of Port Hood Harbour and two off-shore islands. Its front elevation is one-and-a-half storeys with two-and-a-half storeys at the rear. Built in the mid-1850s, its front façade has a central front entrance with two windows on either side and a Scottish dormer above. It is the only house in Inverness County built of dressed stone ashlar masonry. Municipal designation covers both the building and surrounding property.

=== Heritage Value ===
The Peter Smyth House is valued as the finest example of a Georgian stone residence in Inverness County and is one of only three stone houses remaining in the county. Built for prominent merchant Peter Smyth, the stone is believed to have been quarried locally in the district of Port Hood. In true Georgian style, it has a raised first floor level entrance with a fanlight and sidelights with original stone stairs ascending to it. While one-and-a-half storeys at the front, at the rear there are a full two-and-a-half storeys. The lower level of the house, (partly below ground level on the front), contains a kitchen with original fireplace, pantry, storage and bedroom. It may be the only surviving house in Inverness County with servants quarters. The Peter Smyth House is also valued as the home of one of the most prominent Inverness County merchants and politicians of the nineteenth century - Peter Smyth. Born in Dublin, Ireland circa 1800, Peter Smyth came to Port Hood in 1830 and established himself as a fish and cattle merchant. He was heavily involved in the shipping trade and owned at least two stores for both retail and wholesale businesses. He also dealt extensively in land. After a period as a Justice of the Peace for Inverness County, he was elected to the Provincial House of Assembly in Halifax and served Inverness County in various sessions from 1847 to 1863. In 1867, he was appointed to the Legislative Council, a position which he held until his death in 1879.

He also served as Custos Rotulorum (Chief Magistrate) and as commissioner for the school board and for roads. Peter Smyth is remembered as a strong supporter of the Roman Catholic Church in the Diocese of Arichat (later the Diocese of Antigonish, 1886). When he died in 1879, he was reputed to be the wealthiest man on Cape Breton Island. He made generous bequests towards St. Ninian's Cathedral and St. Francis Xavier College in Antigonish. In Port Hood, he made a major contribution to the construction of the present St. Peter's Catholic Church (1881) and was instrumental in the establishment of a boys and girls public school in Port Hood under the tutelage of the Sisters of Notre Dame of Montreal. His widow, Ellen (Keating) Smyth, was a gracious hostess and when the first two Sisters arrived in 1884, they resided with her in the stone house until their new convent was ready for occupancy.

This house was also occupied by two more generations of the Smyth family. It was the official residence of John I. Smyth when he was elected the first mayor of the newly established town of Port Hood in 1903. From the 1920s through to the 1940s, Eleanor Smyth, a granddaughter of Peter Smyth, was a very well known female entrepreneur in Inverness County. She operated an inn at her home called Killarney Manor and an ice cream parlour (in an adjacent building on the property) catering to visiting county councillors, politicians, lawyers, judges, and educators in Port Hood, the Shire Town of Inverness County. Source: Municipality of the County of Inverness, Municipal Heritage Files, Peter Smyth House His former home in Port Hood has been designated as a provincial heritage property.
