= William McClean =

Barbadian cricketer

Personal information
- Born: 21 January 1842; Bridgetown, Barbados
- Source: Cricinfo, 13 November 2020

William McClean (born 21 January 1842, date of death unknown) was a Barbadian cricketer. He played in one first-class match for the Barbados cricket team in 1864/65.

== See also ==
- List of Barbadian representative cricketers
