= William MacEachern =

Canadian politician (1930-2020)

The Honourable Bill MacEachern ECNS

MLA for Inverness County
- In office 1974–1981

Personal details
- Born: July 26, 1930 Judique, Nova Scotia
- Died: March 1, 2020 (aged 89) Halifax, Nova Scotia
- Party: Nova Scotia Liberal Party
- Occupation: Journalist

William Malcolm (Bill) MacEachern (July 26, 1930 – March 1, 2020) was a politician in Nova Scotia, Canada.

He was born in Judique, Inverness County, Nova Scotia. In 1974, MacEachern was elected to represent the electoral district of Inverness County as a Liberal in the Nova Scotia House of Assembly, where he served until his defeat in the 1981 election. MacEachern served in the Executive Council of Nova Scotia in Gerald Regan's government as Minister of Public Health and Registrar General, and Minister of Social Services and Minister Responsible for the Status of Women. He died on March 1, 2020.
