= Billy Joe MacLean =

Canadian politician (1936–2025)

MLA for Inverness South
- In office 1981–1988
- Preceded by: new riding
- Succeeded by: Danny Graham

Mayor of Port Hawkesbury, Nova Scotia
- In office 1994 – November 2, 2016
- Preceded by: Almon Chisholm
- Succeeded by: Brenda Chisholm-Beaton
- In office 1974–1981

Personal details
- Born: November 24, 1936 Antigonish, Nova Scotia, Canada
- Died: April 23, 2025 (aged 88) Sydney, Nova Scotia, Canada
- Party: Progressive Conservative (1981–86); Independent (1987–88)
- Occupation: businessman

William Joseph MacLean (November 24, 1936 – April 23, 2025) was a Canadian politician. He represented the electoral district of Inverness South in the Nova Scotia House of Assembly from 1981 to 1988. He represented the Nova Scotia Progressive Conservative Party until he was expelled as an MLA on October 30, 1986, but was elected as an independent on February 24, 1987. He ran again as an independent in the 1988 Nova Scotia general election and was defeated by Danny Graham.

MacLean was born in Antigonish, Nova Scotia on November 24, 1936. One of his brothers, Norman J. MacLean, also served in the Nova Scotia House of Assembly for Inverness County from 1963 to 1973. He attended St. Francis Xavier University and was a businessman. From 1968 to 1973, (having been on town council since 1962) he served as deputy mayor of Port Hawkesbury, and from 1973 to 1981 as mayor. He was married to Glenda Auld. In 1994, MacLean was elected once again to serve as mayor of Port Hawkesbury and was later reelected. In November 2015, MacLean announced that he would not seek re-election in 2016. MacLean was the centre of controversy when a bar run by him had its liquor licence and video lottery terminal certificate suspended for a brief period after violating exotic dancing laws.

== Provincial politics ==
MacLean entered provincial politics in the 1981 election, defeating Liberal incumbent Bill MacEachern by 62 votes in the new Inverness South riding. He was re-elected in the 1984 election, defeating Liberal Danny Graham by over 1500 votes. MacLean served in the Executive Council of Nova Scotia as Minister of Culture, Recreation and Fitness.

On April 8, 1986, MacLean resigned from cabinet because of an RCMP investigation into his expenses. Later that day, RCMP charged him with one count of fraud, five counts of uttering forged documents and four counts of forgery. On October 3, 1986, MacLean pleaded guilty to four counts of uttering forged documents worth more than $21,000 on his expense accounts and was fined $6,000. Despite telling the media he would quit his seat, and repeated calls from opposition members and premier John Buchanan to resign, MacLean refused to quit. On October 24, he was expelled from the Progressive Conservative caucus, and Buchanan threatened to recall the legislature to deal with MacLean if he did not resign. MacLean still refused to quit, forcing Buchanan to recall the legislature to pass special legislation to unseat him. On October 30, in a special one-day sitting of the legislature, MacLean was expelled as MLA, as the House passed legislation which authorized the expulsion of a member convicted of an offence punishable by a jail term of more than five years. The legislation also banned anyone convicted of such an offence from being nominated or elected to the legislature for five years after the conviction.

On November 28, 1986, MacLean's lawyer filed papers with the Supreme Court of Nova Scotia, challenging the law that stripped him of his seat. The case was heard on December 22, with MacLean's lawyers arguing that the law violated his rights. On January 6, 1987, the Supreme Court upheld MacLean's expulsion as MLA, but ruled that the law banning him from seeking re-election, contravened the Charter of Rights, thus declaring the law unconstitutional, and allowing MacLean to run in the byelection. On February 24, 1987, MacLean was re-elected, defeating Liberal Allan MacDonald by 165 votes. In the 1988 election, MacLean lost his seat to Liberal Danny Graham by 123 votes.

== Death ==
MacLean died from a Streptococcus A infection at a hospital in Sydney, Nova Scotia, on April 23, 2025, at the age of 88.
