= Norman J. MacLean =

Canadian politician

MLA for Inverness North
- In office 1984–1988
- Preceded by: John Archie MacKenzie
- Succeeded by: Charles MacArthur

MLA for Inverness
- In office 1963–1974

Personal details
- Born: September 21, 1920 Port Hawkesbury, Nova Scotia
- Died: July 3, 2000 (aged 79) Inverness, Nova Scotia
- Party: Progressive Conservative
- Occupation: Politician

Norman James MacLean (September 21, 1920 – July 3, 2000) was a Canadian politician and medical professional. He represented the electoral district of Inverness in the Nova Scotia House of Assembly from 1963 to 1974, and Inverness North from 1984 to 1988. He was a member of the Nova Scotia Progressive Conservative Party.

MacLean was born in Port Hawkesbury. He was educated at the St. Francis Xavier University and Dalhousie University, earning an M.D. degree at the latter. He married Dorothy Alicia Tobin in 1945.

MacLean died on July 3, 2000.
