= Inverness (provincial electoral district) =

Provincial electoral district in Nova Scotia, Canada

Nova Scotia electoral district

Provincial electoral district
- Legislature: Nova Scotia House of Assembly
MLA
Kyle MacQuarrie
Progressive Conservative
- District created: 1836
- Last contested: 2024

Demographics
- Population (2011): 17,963
- Electors: 11,147
- Area (km²): 3,889
- Pop. density (per km²): 4.6
- Census division: Inverness County
- Census subdivision(s): Inverness, Subd. A, Inverness, Subd. B, Inverness, Subd. C, Whycocomagh 2

Inverness is a provincial electoral district on Cape Breton Island, Nova Scotia, Canada, that elects one member of the Nova Scotia House of Assembly.

Initially created with the name "Juste-au-Corps", the electoral district of Inverness has existed in various forms since 1836. The name was changed to Inverness after lobbying by William Young. It existed continuously as Inverness County until 1981 when it was divided into Inverness North and Inverness South. It was re-formed in 1993.

Following the 2012 redistribution, the district lost the Town of Port Hawkesbury to the new district of Cape Breton-Richmond.

Following the 2026 Nova Scotia Supreme Court ruling that existing boundaries violated the Charter of Rights and Freedoms, the district was divided in two to improve Acadian representation. The northern section was detached to form the new district of Chéticamp-Margarees-Pleasant Bay while the southern portion retained the original district name and its MHA until the next general election. A by-election was called to elect a member for the newly established district.

== Geography ==
The land area of Inverness is 3,889 km^{2} (1,502 sq mi).

== Members of the Legislative Assembly ==
Inverness have elected the following members of the Legislative Assembly:

Inverness
Legislature	Years	Member	Party
Riding recreated from Inverness North and Inverness South
56th	1993–1998	Charles MacArthur	Liberal
57th	1998–1999	Charlie MacDonald	Liberal
58th	1999–2003	Rodney MacDonald	Progressive Conservative
59th	2003–2006	Rodney MacDonald	Progressive Conservative
60th	2006–2009	Rodney MacDonald	Progressive Conservative
61st	2009–2009	Rodney MacDonald	Progressive Conservative
61st	2009–2013	Allan MacMaster	Progressive Conservative
62nd	2013–2017	Allan MacMaster	Progressive Conservative
63rd	2017–2021	Allan MacMaster	Progressive Conservative
64th	2021–2024	Allan MacMaster	Progressive Conservative
65th	2024–present	Kyle MacQuarrie	Progressive Conservative

Inverness returned two members from 1867 to 1981.

Legislature	Years	Member	Party	Member	Party
52nd	1978–1981	William (Bill) MacEachern	Liberal	John Archie MacKenzie	Liberal
51st	1974–1978	William (Bill) MacEachern	Liberal	John Archie MacKenzie	Liberal
50th	1970–1974	Norman J. MacLean	Progressive Conservative	John Archie MacKenzie	Liberal
49th	1967–1970	Norman J. MacLean	Progressive Conservative	William N. MacLean	Liberal
48th	1963–1967	Norman J. MacLean	Progressive Conservative	William N. MacLean	Liberal
47th	1960–1963	Joseph Clyde Nunn	Liberal	Roderick MacLean	Liberal
46th	1956–1960	Joseph Clyde Nunn	Liberal	Roderick MacLean	Liberal
45th	1953–1956	Alexander H. McKinnon	Liberal	Roderick MacLean	Liberal
44th	1949–1953	Alexander H. McKinnon	Liberal	Roderick MacLean	Liberal
43rd	1945–1949	Alexander H. McKinnon	Liberal
42nd	1941–1945	Alexander H. McKinnon	Liberal
41st	1937–1941	Moses Elijah McGarry	Liberal	John Alexander McDonald	Liberal
40th	1933–1937	Moses Elijah McGarry	Liberal
39th	1928–1933	Moses Elijah McGarry	Liberal-Conservative	James Adam Proudfoot	Liberal-Conservative
38th	1925–1928	Hubert Meen Aucoin	Conservative	Malcolm McKay	Conservative
37th	1920–1925	Donald MacLennan	Liberal	John C. Bourinot	Liberal
36th	1916–1920	Donald MacLennan	Liberal	John C. Bourinot	Liberal
35th	1911–1916	Donald MacLennan	Liberal	James MacDonald	Liberal
34th	1906–1911	Charles Edward McMillan	Liberal-Conservative	James MacDonald	Liberal
33rd	1901–1906	Moses J. Doucet	Liberal	James MacDonald	Liberal
32nd	1897–1901	Moses J. Doucet	Liberal	James MacDonald	Liberal
31st	1894–1897	Alex Campbell	Liberal-Conservative	John H. Jamieson	Liberal-Conservative
30th	1890–1894	John McKinnon	Liberal	Daniel McNeil	Liberal
29th	1886–1890	John McKinnon	Liberal	Daniel McNeil	Liberal
28th	1882–1886	Duncan J. Campbell	Liberal	Alex Campbell	Conservative
27th	1878–1882	Duncan J. Campbell	Liberal	Alex Campbell	Conservative
26th	1874–1878	John McKinnon	Liberal	Duncan J. Campbell	Conservative
25th	1871–1874	Hiram Blanchard	Conservative	Samuel McDonnell	Conservative
24th	1867–1871	Hiram Blanchard	Conservative	Alexander Campbell	Liberal

== Election results ==
2024 Nova Scotia general election redistributed results
Party	Votes	%
Progressive Conservative	3,112	59.1
Liberal	1,496	28.4
New Democratic	655	12.4

=== 2024 ===
2024 Nova Scotia general election
Party	Candidate	Votes	%	±%
Progressive Conservative	Kyle MacQuarrie	4,058	57.63	+1.78
Liberal	Jaime Beaton	2,099	29.81	-6.15
New Democratic	Joanna Clark	884	12.56	+4.37
Total valid votes		7,041	99.02	
Total rejected ballots		70	0.98	+0.36
Turnout		7,111	48.93	-11.75
Eligible voters		14,534		
Progressive Conservative hold		Swing		+3.97
Source: Elections Nova Scotia

=== 2021 ===
2021 Nova Scotia general election
Party	Candidate	Votes	%	±%	Expenditures
Progressive Conservative	Allan MacMaster	4,833	55.85	-3.41	$33,264.46
Liberal	Damian MacInnis	3,112	35.96	+3.76	$42,102.76
New Democratic	Joanna Clark	708	8.18	-0.34	$21,360.60
Total valid votes/expense limit		8,653	99.38	–	$83,197.40
Total rejected ballots		54	0.62		
Turnout		8,707	60.68		
Eligible voters		14,350			
Progressive Conservative hold		Swing		-3.58	
Source: Elections Nova Scotia

=== 2017 ===
2017 provincial election redistributed results
Party	Vote	%
Progressive Conservative	5,338	59.27
Liberal	2,901	32.21
New Democratic	768	8.53

2017 Nova Scotia general election
Party	Candidate	Votes	%	±%
Progressive Conservative	Allan MacMaster	4,687	61.90	+12.61
Liberal	Bobby Morris	2,347	31.00	-10.96
New Democratic	Michelle Smith	538	7.11	-1.65
Total valid votes		7,572	99.53	
Total rejected ballots		36	0.47	-0.42
Turnout		7,608	66.22	-3.79
Eligible voters		11,489		
Progressive Conservative hold		Swing		+11.78
Source: Elections Nova Scotia

=== 2013 ===
2013 Nova Scotia general election
Party	Candidate	Votes	%	±%
Progressive Conservative	Allan MacMaster	3,816	49.29	+11.95
Liberal	Jackie Rankin	3,248	41.95	+2.85
New Democratic	Michelle A. Smith	678	8.76	-12.02
Total valid votes		7,742	99.10	
Total rejected ballots		70	0.90	
Turnout		7,812	70.01	
Eligible voters		11,159		
Progressive Conservative notional gain from Liberal		Swing		+4.55
Source(s) Source: Nova Scotia Legislature (2024). "Electoral History for Inverness" (PDF). nslegislature.ca. Nova Scotia, Chief Electoral Officer (2013). 39th Provincial General Election, October 8, 2013: Volume 1 – Statement of Votes & Statistics (PDF) (Report). Elections Nova Scotia. Archived from the original (PDF) on 10 April 2018.
Note: Change is calculated from the transposed results of the 2009 by-election

=== 2009 by-election ===
2009 by-election redistributed results
Party	Vote	%
Liberal	2,944	39.10
Progressive Conservative	2,811	37.34
New Democratic	1,564	20.77
Green	210	2.79

Nova Scotia provincial by-election, October 20, 2009 Resignation of Rodney MacDonald
Party	Candidate	Votes	%	±%
Progressive Conservative	Allan MacMaster	3,158	35.77	-20.40
Liberal	Ian McNeil	3,104	35.16	+15.35
New Democratic	Bert Lewis	2,344	26.55	+6.05
Green	Nathalie Arsenault	223	2.53	-1.00
Total valid votes		8,829	99.49	
Total rejected ballots		45	0.51	+0.05
Turnout		8,866 (Note: Following a judicial recount, it was found that there were eight more ballots counted than the number of electors who voted.)	61.50	-5.35
Eligible voters		14,416		
Progressive Conservative hold		Swing		-17.88
Source(s) Source: Elections Nova Scotia. "OCTOBER 20, 2009 ELECTORAL DISTRICT OF INVERNESS BY-ELECTION POLL-BY-POLL RESULTS" (PDF). Archived from the original on 10 February 2024.

=== 2009 ===
2009 Nova Scotia general election
Party	Candidate	Votes	%	±%
Progressive Conservative	Rodney MacDonald	5,402	56.17	-14.30
New Democratic	Michael MacIsaac	1,971	20.49	+7.72
Liberal	Shaun Bennett	1,905	19.81	+4.32
Green	Nathalie Arsenault	339	3.53	+2.26
Total valid votes		9,617	99.54	
Total rejected ballots		44	0.46	+0.00
Turnout		9,661	66.84	-3.85
Eligible voters		14,453		
Progressive Conservative hold		Swing		-11.01
Source(s) Source: Elections Nova Scotia. "JUNE 9, 2009 NOVA SCOTIA PROVINCIAL GENERAL ELECTION POLL BY POLL RESULTS" (PDF). Archived from the original (PDF) on 3 March 2016.

=== 2006 ===
2006 Nova Scotia general election
Party	Candidate	Votes	%	±%
Progressive Conservative	Rodney MacDonald	7,404	70.47	+19.29
Liberal	Mary MacLennan	1,627	15.49	-21.22
New Democratic	Tim Murphy	1,342	12.77	+0.66
Green	John G. Gibson	133	1.27	–
Total valid votes		10,506	99.55	
Total rejected ballots		48	0.45	-0.11
Turnout		10,554	70.69	-21.14
Eligible voters		14,930		
Progressive Conservative hold		Swing		+20.25
Source(s) Source: Elections Nova Scotia. "JUNE 13, 2006 NOVA SCOTIA PROVINCIAL GENERAL ELECTION" (PDF). Archived from the original on 6 October 2014.

=== 2003 ===
2003 Nova Scotia general election
Party	Candidate	Votes	%	±%
Progressive Conservative	Rodney MacDonald	5,398	51.19	+8.29
Liberal	Debbie Gillis	3,871	36.71	-2.57
New Democratic	Tim Murphy	1,277	12.11	-5.73
Total valid votes		10,546	99.43	
Total rejected ballots		60	0.57	-0.44
Turnout		10,606	91.83	+13.98
Eligible voters		11,550		
Progressive Conservative hold		Swing		+5.43
Source(s) Source: Elections Nova Scotia. "34 - INVERNESS" (PDF). Archived from the original (PDF) on 6 October 2014.

=== 1999 ===
1999 Nova Scotia general election
Party	Candidate	Votes	%	±%
Progressive Conservative	Rodney MacDonald	3,876	42.89	+21.66
Liberal	Charlie MacDonald	3,549	39.27	-8.56
New Democratic	Roy Yipp	1,612	17.84	-6.91
Total valid votes		9,037	98.99	
Total rejected ballots		92	1.01	-0.03
Turnout		9,129	77.85	-1.18
Eligible voters		11,727		
Progressive Conservative gain from Liberal		Swing		+15.11
Source(s) Source: Elections Nova Scotia. "Inverness" (PDF). Archived from the original on 6 October 2014. Nova Scotia, Chief Electoral Officer (1999). Returns of the General Election for the House of Assembly, Thirty-Fifth General Election (Report). Elections Nova Scotia.

=== 1998 ===
1998 Nova Scotia general election
Party	Candidate	Votes	%	±%
Liberal	Charlie MacDonald	4,396	47.83	-12.31
New Democratic	Maria Coady	2,274	24.74	+15.40
Progressive Conservative	Rodney MacDonald	1,951	21.23	-9.28
Independent	Ed MacDonald	569	6.19	–
Total valid votes		9,190	98.97	
Total rejected ballots		96	1.03	+0.28
Turnout		9,286	79.02	-1.03
Eligible voters		11,751		
Liberal hold		Swing		-13.85
Source(s) Source: Elections Nova Scotia. "Election Returns, 1998" (PDF). Archived from the original (PDF) on 15 October 2014.

=== 1993 ===
1993 Nova Scotia general election
Party	Candidate	Votes	%
Liberal	Charles MacArthur	5,804	60.15
Progressive Conservative	Frank Crowdis	2,944	30.51
New Democratic	Mary T. Goodwin	902	9.35
Total valid votes		9,650	99.25
Total rejected ballots		73	0.75
Turnout		9,723	80.05
Eligible voters		12,146	
Source(s) Source: Elections Nova Scotia. "Election Returns 1993" (PDF). Archived from the original (PDF) on 6 October 2014.

=== 1978 ===
1978 Nova Scotia general election: Inverness County
Party	Candidate	Votes	%	±%	Elected
Liberal	William MacEachern	6,270	27.10	+0.61	✓
Liberal	John Archie MacKenzie	5,632	24.34	-1.20	✓
Progressive Conservative	Bernie MacLean	5,412	23.39		
Progressive Conservative	Bill MacIsaac	4,614	19.94		
New Democratic	Archie A. Chisholm	644	2.78		
New Democratic	Joyce Campbell	563	2.43		
Total valid votes		21,135			
Total rejected ballots		100	0.43	-0.05	
Turnout		12,365	84.41	+2.18	
Eligible voters		14,649			
Liberal hold		Swing		-0.58	
Source(s) Source: Nova Scotia Legislature (2024). "Electoral History for Inverness County" (PDF). nslegislature.ca. Nova Scotia, Chief Electoral Officer (1978). Returns of the General Election for the House of Assembly, Twenty-Ninth General Election (PDF) (Report). Queen's Printer. Archived from the original (PDF) on 18 June 2018.

=== 1974 ===
1974 Nova Scotia general election: Inverness County
Party	Candidate	Votes	%	Elected
Liberal	William MacEachern	5,606	26.50	✓
Liberal	John Archie MacKenzie	5,403	25.54	✓
Progressive Conservative	Norman J. MacLean	4,832	22.84	
Progressive Conservative	Joseph Shannon	4,088	19.32	
New Democratic	Donald MacKay	621	2.94	
New Democratic	Winston Bennett	466	2.20	
Independent	Catherine Haig	139	0.66	
Total		21,155	–	
Source(s) Source: Nova Scotia Legislature (2024). "Electoral History for Inverness County" (PDF). nslegislature.ca. Nova Scotia, Chief Electoral Officer (1974). Returns of the General Election for the House of Assembly, Twenty-Eighth General Election (PDF) (Report). Queen's Printer. Archived from the original (PDF) on 18 June 2018.

=== 1970 ===
1970 Nova Scotia general election: Inverness County
Party	Candidate	Votes	%	Elected
Progressive Conservative	Norman J. MacLean	4,607	25.23	✓
Liberal	John Archie MacKenzie	4,124	22.59	✓
Liberal	William N. MacLean	3,939	21.57	
Progressive Conservative	Joe Shannon	3,728	20.42	
Independent	Al Davis	1,304	7.14	
New Democratic	Jerry Yetman	556	3.05	
Total		18,258	–	
Source(s) Source: Nova Scotia Legislature (2024). "Electoral History for Inverness County" (PDF). nslegislature.ca. Nova Scotia, Legislative Assembly (1970). Returns of the General Election for the House of Assembly, 1970 (PDF) (Report). Queen's Printer. Archived from the original (PDF) on 25 July 2018.

=== 1967 ===
1967 Nova Scotia general election: Inverness County
Party	Candidate	Votes	%	Elected
Progressive Conservative	Norman J. MacLean	3,994	26.27	✓
Liberal	William N. MacLean	3,956	26.02	✓
Progressive Conservative	Alfred James Davis	3,680	24.21	
Liberal	William MacIsaac	3,571	23.49	
Total		15,201	–	
Source(s) Source: Nova Scotia Legislature (2024). "Electoral History for Inverness County" (PDF). nslegislature.ca. Nova Scotia Legislature (1967). Returns of the General Election for the House of Assembly (PDF) (Report). Queen's Printer. Archived from the original (PDF) on 25 July 2018.

=== 1963 ===
1963 Nova Scotia general election: Inverness County
Party	Candidate	Votes	%	Elected
Progressive Conservative	Norman J. MacLean	4,474	26.78	✓
Liberal	William N. MacLean	4,219	25.25	✓
Progressive Conservative	Alfred James Davis	4,026	24.10	
Liberal	Joseph Clyde Nunn	3,988	23.87	
Total		16,707	–	
Source(s) Source: Nova Scotia Legislature (2024). "Electoral History for Inverness County" (PDF). nslegislature.ca. Nova Scotia Legislature (1963). Returns of the General Election for the House of Assembly (PDF) (Report). Queen's Printer. Archived from the original (PDF) on 25 July 2018.

=== 1962 by-election ===
Nova Scotia provincial by-election, 1962-09-11: Inverness County
Party	Candidate	Votes	%	Elected
Liberal	William N. MacLean	4,354	50.43	✓
Progressive Conservative	Alfred James Davis	4,279	49.57	
Total		8,633	–	
Source(s) Source: Nova Scotia Legislature (2024). "Electoral History for Inverness County" (PDF). nslegislature.ca.

=== 1960 ===
1960 Nova Scotia general election: Inverness County
Party	Candidate	Votes	%	Elected
Liberal	Joseph Clyde Nunn	4,113	25.62	✓
Liberal	Roderick MacLean	4,018	25.03	✓
Progressive Conservative	Archie Neil Chisholm	3,923	24.43	
Progressive Conservative	Ralph Mauger MacKichan	3,648	22.72	
Co-operative Commonwealth	Stephen James MacLellan	353	2.20	
Total		16,055	–	
Source(s) Source: Nova Scotia Legislature (2024). "Electoral History for Inverness County" (PDF). nslegislature.ca. Nova Scotia Legislature (1960). Returns of the General Election for the House of Assembly (PDF) (Report). Queen's Printer. Archived from the original (PDF) on 25 July 2018.

=== 1956 ===
1956 Nova Scotia general election: Inverness County
Party	Candidate	Votes	%	Elected
Liberal	Joseph Clyde Nunn	4,415	27.80	✓
Liberal	Roderick MacLean	4,252	26.78	✓
Progressive Conservative	Archie Neil Chisholm	3,673	23.13	
Progressive Conservative	A. L. Davis	3,539	22.29	
Total		15,879	–	
Source(s) Source: Nova Scotia Legislature (2024). "Electoral History for Inverness County" (PDF). nslegislature.ca. Nova Scotia Legislature (1956). Returns of the General Election for the House of Assembly (PDF) (Report). Queen's Printer. Archived from the original (PDF) on 10 September 2018.

=== 1954 by-election ===
Nova Scotia provincial by-election, 1954-11-16: Inverness County
Party	Candidate	Votes	%	Elected
Liberal	Joseph Clyde Nunn	4,825	55.99	✓
Progressive Conservative	Isaac Duncan MacDougall	3,205	37.19	
Co-operative Commonwealth	Joseph Rankin	587	6.81	
Total		8,617	–	
Source(s) Source: Nova Scotia Legislature (2024). "Electoral History for Inverness County" (PDF). nslegislature.ca.

=== 1953 ===
1953 Nova Scotia general election: Inverness County
Party	Candidate	Votes	%	Elected
Liberal	Alexander H. McKinnon	4,725	29.17	✓
Liberal	Roderick MacLean	4,513	27.86	✓
Progressive Conservative	Leo P. Boudreau	3,585	22.13	
Progressive Conservative	Alexander A. MacInnis	3,374	20.83	
Total		16,197	–	
Source(s) Source: Nova Scotia Legislature (2024). "Electoral History for Inverness County" (PDF). nslegislature.ca. Nova Scotia Legislature (1953). Returns of the General Election for the House of Assembly (PDF) (Report). Queen's Printer. Archived from the original (PDF) on 10 September 2018.

=== 1949 ===
1949 Nova Scotia general election: Inverness County
Party	Candidate	Votes	%	Elected
Liberal	Alexander H. McKinnon	6,168	37.72	✓
Liberal	Roderick MacLean	5,562	34.01	✓
Progressive Conservative	Alcorn A. Munro	2,368	14.48	
Progressive Conservative	George H. Penny	2,254	13.78	
Total		16,352	–	
Source(s) Source: Nova Scotia Legislature (2024). "Electoral History for Inverness County" (PDF). nslegislature.ca. Nova Scotia Legislature (1949). Returns of the General Election for the House of Assembly (PDF) (Report). Queen's Printer. Archived from the original (PDF) on 10 September 2018.

=== 1945 ===
1945 Nova Scotia general election: Inverness County
Party	Candidate	Votes	%	Elected
Liberal	Alexander H. McKinnon	5,283	70.59	
Progressive Conservative	Alexander Angus MacInnes	2,201	29.41	
Total		7,484	–	
Source(s) Source: Nova Scotia Legislature (2024). "Electoral History for Inverness County" (PDF). nslegislature.ca. Nova Scotia Legislature (1945). Returns of the General Election for the House of Assembly (PDF) (Report). Queen's Printer. Archived from the original (PDF) on 10 September 2018.

=== 1941 ===
1941 Nova Scotia general election: Inverness County
Party	Candidate	Votes	%	Elected
Liberal	Alexander H. McKinnon	5,302	63.54	
Progressive Conservative	Alexander Daniel McInnis	3,043	36.46	
Total		8,345	–	
Source(s) Source: Nova Scotia Legislature (2024). "Electoral History for Inverness County" (PDF). nslegislature.ca. Nova Scotia Legislature (1941). Returns of the General Election for the House of Assembly (PDF) (Report). Queen's Printer. Archived from the original (PDF) on 8 February 2024.

=== 1940 by-election ===
Nova Scotia provincial by-election, 1940-10-28: Inverness County
Party	Candidate	Votes	%	Elected
Liberal	Alexander H. McKinnon	Acclaimed	N/A	✓
Total			–	
Source(s) Source: Nova Scotia Legislature (2024). "Electoral History for Inverness County" (PDF). nslegislature.ca.

=== 1937 ===
1937 Nova Scotia general election: Inverness County
Party	Candidate	Votes	%	Elected
Liberal	Moses Elijah McGarry	5,836	59.32	
Progressive Conservative	Alexander Daniel McInnis	4,002	40.68	
Total		9,838	–	
Source(s) Source: Nova Scotia Legislature (2024). "Electoral History for Inverness County" (PDF). nslegislature.ca. Nova Scotia Legislature (1937). Returns of the General Election for the House of Assembly (PDF) (Report). Queen's Printer. Archived from the original (PDF) on 1 March 2019.

=== 1933 ===
1933 Nova Scotia general election: Inverness County
Party	Candidate	Votes	%	Elected
Liberal	Moses Elijah McGarry	5,626	53.64	
Liberal-Conservative	Hubert Meen Aucoin	4,862	46.36	
Total		10,488	–	
Source(s) Source: Nova Scotia Legislature (2024). "Electoral History for Inverness County" (PDF). nslegislature.ca. Nova Scotia Legislature (1933). Returns of the General Election for the House of Assembly (PDF) (Report). Queen's Printer. Archived from the original (PDF) on 1 March 2019.

=== 1928 ===
1928 Nova Scotia general election: Inverness County
Party	Candidate	Votes	%	Elected
Liberal	James Adam Proudfoot	4,422	26.74	✓
Liberal	Moses Elijah McGarry	4,318	26.11	✓
Liberal-Conservative	Malcolm McKay	3,930	23.77	
Liberal-Conservative	Hubert Meen Aucoin	3,865	23.37	
Total		16,535	–	
Source(s) Source: Nova Scotia Legislature (2024). "Electoral History for Inverness County" (PDF). nslegislature.ca.

=== 1925 ===
1925 Nova Scotia general election: Inverness County
Party	Candidate	Votes	%	Elected
Liberal-Conservative	Malcolm McKay	4,180	26.18	✓
Liberal-Conservative	Hubert Meen Aucoin	4,019	25.17	✓
Liberal	Moses Elijah McGarry	3,906	24.46	
Liberal	John C. Bourinot	3,862	24.19	
Total		15,967	–	
Source(s) Source: Nova Scotia Legislature (2024). "Electoral History for Inverness County" (PDF). nslegislature.ca.

=== 1920 ===
1920 Nova Scotia general election: Inverness County
Party	Candidate	Votes	%	Elected
Liberal	Donald MacLennan	3,461	26.32	✓
Liberal	John C. Bourinot	3,204	24.36	✓
Liberal-Conservative	Moses Elijah McGarry	2,643	20.10	
Liberal-Conservative	Malcolm McKay	2,081	15.82	
Labour	John J. McNeil	1,763	13.40	
Total		13,152	–	
Source(s) Source: Nova Scotia Legislature (2024). "Electoral History for Inverness County" (PDF). nslegislature.ca.

=== 1916 ===
1916 Nova Scotia general election: Inverness County
Party	Candidate	Votes	%	Elected
Liberal	Donald MacLennan	2,655	26.65	✓
Liberal	John C. Bourinot	2,540	25.49	✓
Liberal-Conservative	Thomas Gallant	2,531	25.40	
Liberal-Conservative	Duncan F. MacLean	2,238	22.46	
Total		9,964	–	
Source(s) Source: Nova Scotia Legislature (2024). "Electoral History for Inverness County" (PDF). nslegislature.ca.

=== 1911 ===
1911 Nova Scotia general election: Inverness County
Party	Candidate	Votes	%	Elected
Liberal	Donald MacLennan	2,723	27.92	✓
Liberal	James MacDonald	2,613	26.79	✓
Liberal-Conservative	Thomas Gallant	2,274	23.32	
Liberal-Conservative	Charles Edward McMillan	2,143	21.97	
Total		9,753	–	
Source(s) Source: Nova Scotia Legislature (2024). "Electoral History for Inverness County" (PDF). nslegislature.ca.

=== 1906 ===
1906 Nova Scotia general election: Inverness County
Party	Candidate	Votes	%	Elected
Liberal	James MacDonald	2,052	22.26	✓
Liberal-Conservative	Charles Edward McMillan	1,639	17.78	✓
Liberal	H. C. Hache	1,540	16.70	
Liberal	Moses J. Doucet	1,530	16.59	
Liberal	Dougald MacLachlan	1,360	14.75	
Liberal-Conservative	Daniel McNeil	1,099	11.92	
Total		9,220	–	
Source(s) Source: Nova Scotia Legislature (2024). "Electoral History for Inverness County" (PDF). nslegislature.ca.

=== 1901 ===
1901 Nova Scotia general election: Inverness County
Party	Candidate	Votes	%	Elected
Liberal	James MacDonald	2,270	27.39	✓
Liberal	Moses J. Doucet	1,734	20.92	✓
Liberal-Conservative	Charles Edward McMillan	1,326	16.00	
Liberal	J. L. McDougall	1,317	15.89	
Liberal-Conservative	Daniel McNeil	1,137	13.72	
Liberal	Alexander Macdonald	504	6.08	
Total		8,288	–	
Source(s) Source: Nova Scotia Legislature (2024). "Electoral History for Inverness County" (PDF). nslegislature.ca.

=== 1897 ===
1897 Nova Scotia general election: Inverness County
Party	Candidate	Votes	%	Elected
Liberal	James MacDonald	2,646	32.94	✓
Liberal	Moses J. Doucet	2,501	31.13	✓
Liberal-Conservative	John H. Jamieson	1,537	19.13	
Liberal-Conservative	Alexander Campbell	1,350	16.80	
Total		8,034	–	
Source(s) Source: Nova Scotia Legislature (2024). "Electoral History for Inverness County" (PDF). nslegislature.ca.

=== 1894 ===
1894 Nova Scotia general election: Inverness County
Party	Candidate	Votes	%	Elected
Liberal-Conservative	John H. Jamieson	1,857	26.45	✓
Liberal-Conservative	Alexander Campbell	1,760	25.07	✓
Liberal	John McKinnon	1,746	24.87	
Liberal	Samuel McDonnell	1,658	23.61	
Total		7,021	–	
Source(s) Source: Nova Scotia Legislature (2024). "Electoral History for Inverness County" (PDF). nslegislature.ca.

=== 1890 ===
1890 Nova Scotia general election: Inverness County
Party	Candidate	Votes	%	Elected
Liberal	Daniel McNeil	1,908	27.76	✓
Liberal	John McKinnon	1,874	27.26	✓
Liberal-Conservative	John McKeen	1,602	23.31	
Liberal-Conservative	Angus MacLennan	1,490	21.68	
Total		6,874	–	
Source(s) Source: Nova Scotia Legislature (2024). "Electoral History for Inverness County" (PDF). nslegislature.ca.

=== 1886 ===
1886 Nova Scotia general election: Inverness County
Party	Candidate	Votes	%	Elected
Liberal	John McKinnon	1,854	31.13	✓
Liberal	Daniel McNeil	1,764	29.62	✓
Liberal-Conservative	A. McLennan	1,363	22.89	
Liberal-Conservative	Alexander Campbell	974	16.36	
Total		5,955	–	
Source(s) Source: Nova Scotia Legislature (2024). "Electoral History for Inverness County" (PDF). nslegislature.ca.

=== 1883 by-election ===
Nova Scotia provincial by-election, 1883-01-11: Inverness County
Party	Candidate	Votes	%	Elected
Liberal-Conservative	Angus MacLennan	734	51.19	✓
Liberal	Samuel MacDonnell	700	48.81	
Total		1,434	–	
Source(s) Source: Nova Scotia Legislature (2024). "Electoral History for Inverness County" (PDF). nslegislature.ca.

=== 1882 ===
1882 Nova Scotia general election: Inverness County
Party	Candidate	Votes	%	Elected
Liberal-Conservative	Alexander Campbell	1,477	26.30	✓
Liberal	Duncan J. Campbell	1,435	25.55	✓
Liberal-Conservative	Angus MacLennan	1,387	24.70	
Liberal	John McKinnon	1,317	23.45	
Total		5,616	–	
Source(s) Source: Nova Scotia Legislature (2024). "Electoral History for Inverness County" (PDF). nslegislature.ca.

=== 1878 ===
1878 Nova Scotia general election: Inverness County
Party	Candidate	Votes	%	Elected
Liberal	Duncan J. Campbell	1,650	27.36	✓
Liberal-Conservative	Alexander Campbell	1,548	25.67	✓
Liberal	John McKinnon	1,440	23.88	
Liberal-Conservative	D. Gillies	1,393	23.10	
Total		6,031	–	
Source(s) Source: Nova Scotia Legislature (2024). "Electoral History for Inverness County" (PDF). nslegislature.ca.

=== 1874 ===
1874 Nova Scotia general election: Inverness County
Party	Candidate	Votes	%	Elected
Independent	Duncan J. Campbell	1,482	27.24	✓
Independent	John McKinnon	1,390	25.55	✓
Liberal	Alexander Campbell	1,309	24.06	
Liberal	Hugh McDonald	1,260	23.16	
Total		5,441	–	
Source(s) Source: Nova Scotia Legislature (2024). "Electoral History for Inverness County" (PDF). nslegislature.ca.

=== 1872 by-election ===
Nova Scotia provincial by-election, 1872-10-16: Inverness County
Party	Candidate	Votes	%	Elected
Liberal-Conservative	Duncan J. Campbell	1,384	51.56	✓
Liberal	Hugh McDonald	1,300	48.44	
Total		2,684	–	
Source(s) Source: Nova Scotia Legislature (2024). "Electoral History for Inverness County" (PDF). nslegislature.ca.

=== 1871 ===
1871 Nova Scotia general election: Inverness County
Party	Candidate	Votes	%	Elected
Liberal-Conservative	Hiram Blanchard	1,427	26.92	✓
Liberal-Conservative	Samuel McDonnell	1,328	25.06	✓
Liberal	Alexander Campbell	1,280	24.15	
Liberal	Hugh McDonald	1,265	23.87	
Total		5,300	–	
Source(s) Source: Nova Scotia Legislature (2024). "Electoral History for Inverness County" (PDF). nslegislature.ca.

=== 1868 by-election ===
Nova Scotia provincial by-election, 1868-10-22: Inverness County
Party	Candidate	Votes	%	Elected
Anti-Confederation	Hugh McDonald	1,324	50.08	✓
Liberal-Conservative	Hiram Blanchard	1,320	49.92	
Total		2,644	–	
Source(s) Source: Nova Scotia Legislature (2024). "Electoral History for Inverness County" (PDF). nslegislature.ca.

=== 1867 ===
1867 Nova Scotia general election: Inverness County
Party	Candidate	Votes	%	Elected
Anti-Confederation	Alexander Campbell	1,058	30.51	✓
Confederation	Hiram Blanchard	986	28.43	✓
Anti-Confederation	H. McInnis	932	26.87	
Anti-Confederation	A. Gillis	492	14.19	
Total		3,468	–	
Source(s) Source: Nova Scotia Legislature (2024). "Electoral History for Inverness County" (PDF). nslegislature.ca.

== See also ==
- List of Nova Scotia provincial electoral districts
- Canadian provincial electoral districts
