= Greg MacIsaac =

Canadian politician

MLA for Richmond
- In office October 6, 1981 – February 24, 1988
- Preceded by: John E. LeBrun
- Succeeded by: Richie Mann

Personal details
- Born: August 17, 1945 Glace Bay, Nova Scotia
- Died: May 26, 2021 (aged 75) Port Hawkesbury, Nova Scotia
- Party: Progressive Conservative

Gregory MacIsaac (August 17, 1945 — May 26, 2021) is a Canadian politician. He represented the electoral district of Richmond in the Nova Scotia House of Assembly from 1981 to 1988. He was a member of the Progressive Conservative Party of Nova Scotia.

== Early life and education ==
Born in 1945, at Glace Bay, Nova Scotia, MacIsaac was educated at the Nova Scotia Institute of Technology, St. Francis Xavier University, and Dalhousie University.

== Political career ==
MacIsaac entered provincial politics in the 1981 election, defeating Liberal incumbent John E. LeBrun by 352 votes in the Richmond riding. He was re-elected in the 1984 election, defeating Liberal Richie Mann by 472 votes. On February 5, 1988, MacIsaac was found guilty of nine counts of fraud, forgery and using forged receipts to justify more than $10,000 in claims on his MLA expense accounts, and was kicked out of the Progressive Conservative caucus. On February 17, 1988, MacIssac announced he was resigning as MLA effective February 24. On March 30, 1988, MacIsaac was sentenced to one year in jail.
