= R. Colin Stewart =

Canadian politician

MLA for Colchester South
- In office 1978–1993
- Preceded by: new riding
- Succeeded by: riding dissolved

Personal details
- Born: June 25, 1926 Greenvale, Pictou County, Nova Scotia
- Died: August 13, 1994 (aged 68) Halifax, Nova Scotia
- Resting place: Pine Grove Cemetery, Stewiacke East, Nova Scotia
- Party: Progressive Conservative
- Occupation: Doctor

Robert Colin David Stewart (June 25, 1926 – August 13, 1994), commonly known as Colin Stewart, was a Canadian politician. He represented the electoral district of Colchester South in the Nova Scotia House of Assembly from 1978 to 1993. He was a member of the Nova Scotia Progressive Conservative Party.

Stewart was born at Greenvale in Pictou County, Nova Scotia, in 1926. He attended Acadia University and Dalhousie University and earned Bachelor of Science and Doctor of Medicine (M.D.) degrees, later practicing as a physician. Stewart is also a former mayor of Stewiacke, Nova Scotia. He was married to Pearl Campbell. He died on August 13, 1994, at the Halifax Infirmary, aged 68.
