= Whycocomagh, Nova Scotia =

Community in Nova Scotia, Canada

Coordinates: 45°58′36.07″N 61°7′4.7″W

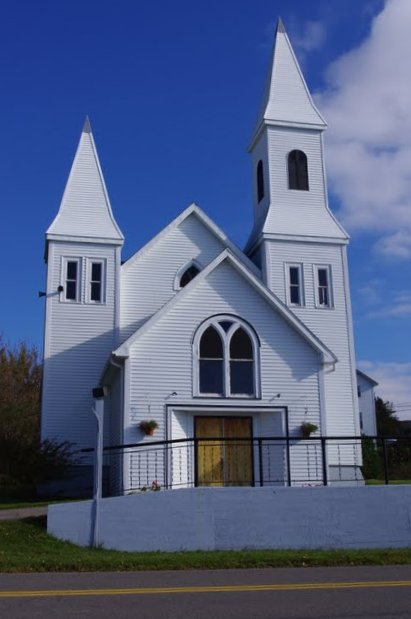
St. Andrew's Presbyterian Church in Whycocomagh, Nova Scotia

Whycocomagh (/waɪˈkɒkəmɑː/) is an unincorporated community on the eastern edge of the Municipality of the County of Inverness, Nova Scotia, Canada. The population in 2001 was 854.

The name derives from the Mi'kmaq language and relates to being near the water. In Scottish Gaelic it is called Hogamà.

Whycocomagh in Nova Scotia

It is located where the Skye River flows into St. Patrick's Channel, an arm of Bras d'Or Lake in the central part of Cape Breton Island, next to the Whycocomagh 2 reserve.

The town is a local service centre and has an education centre, elementary school, and the Whycocomagh Provincial Park.
