= Inverness, Nova Scotia =

Community in Nova Scotia, Canada

Inverness Gaelic: Baile Inbhir Nis
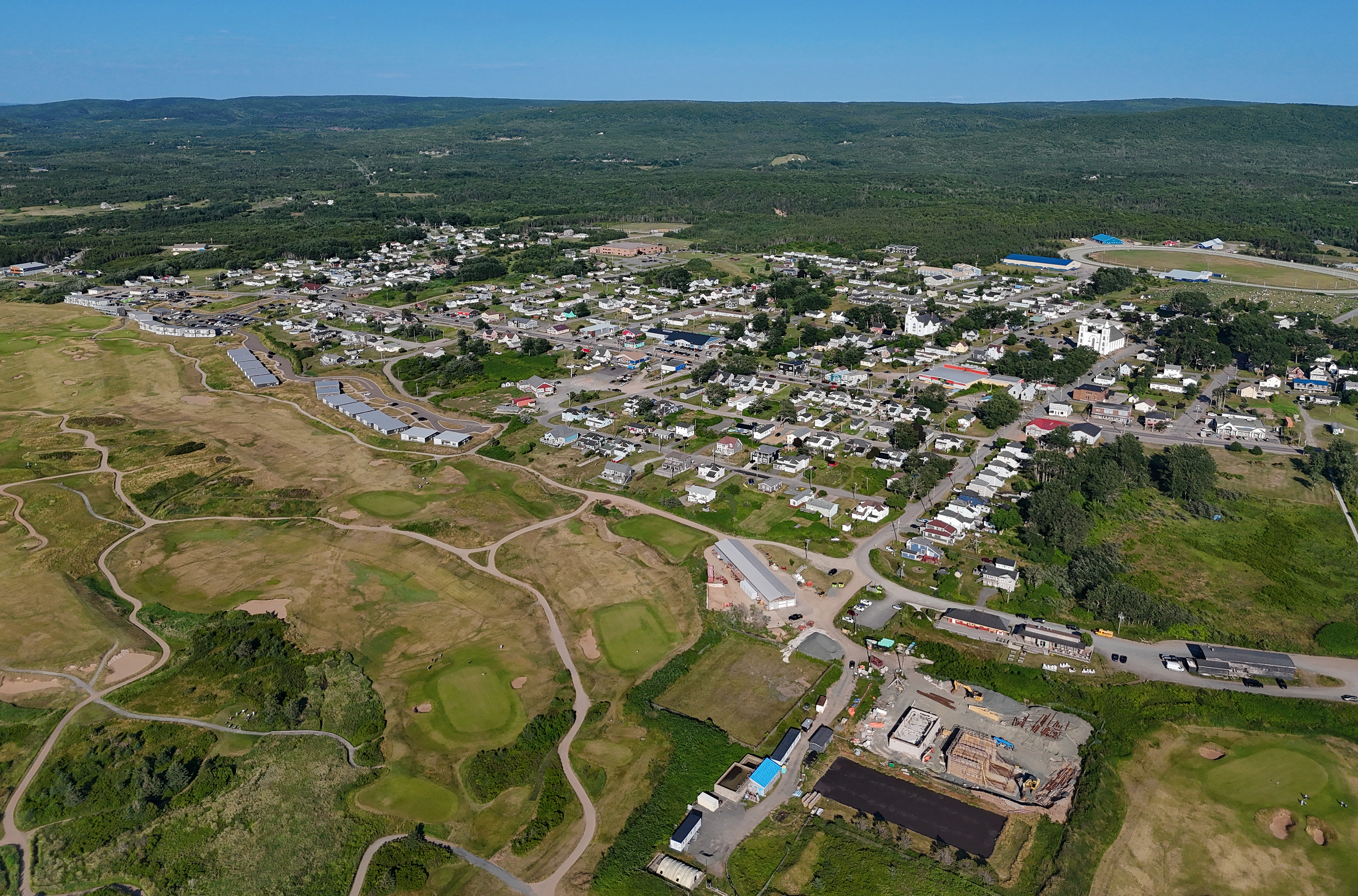

- Location of Inverness, Nova Scotia
- Coordinates: 46°13′49″N 61°18′23″W
- Country: Canada
- Province: Nova Scotia
- County: Inverness
- Established: 1904
- Electoral Districts Federal: Cape Breton—Canso
- Provincial: Inverness

Area
  - Total: 2.73 km^{2} (1.05 sq mi)

Population (2021)
  - Total: 1,228
  - Density: 449.9/km^{2} (1,165/sq mi)
- Time zone: UTC-4 (AST)
  - Summer (DST): UTC-3 (ADT)
- Postal code(s): B0E
- Area code: 902: 258

Inverness (Scottish Gaelic: Baile Inbhir Nis) is a Canadian rural community in Inverness County, Nova Scotia. It is about an hour's drive north from the Canso Causeway and about an hour south from Cape Breton Highlands National Park. In 2021, its population was 1,228, down 1.6% from 2016.

== History ==
=== Coal-mining ===
Located on the west coast of Cape Breton Island fronting the Gulf of St. Lawrence, Inverness sits astride a small coal seam which was exploited from the late 19th century to the mid-late 20th century, beginning with a mine opened by William Penn Hussey of Massachusetts. Before Hussey industrialized the coal operations of the town it was exploited by the locals, but without means to export the coal it was never mined in earnest. Hussey was able to secure financial backing from European investors and soon dredged a portion of the sand dunes to connect MacIsaac's Pond to the Gulf of St. Lawrence. He had some piers and wharves built, laid a small railway and was able to ship coal to export markets. Hussey's operations were profitable but ten years later his infrastructure fell into disrepair and he sold off his interests.

Immediately following Hussey's departure the town entered the era of William Mackenzie and Donald Mann during the 1890s. These two (whom local streets are named after) were able to lobby the Government in order to fund a railway project from Port Hawkesbury to Inverness. As a result of this endeavour they were able to open several more mines in and near Inverness during the early 20th century. These were shaft mines and extended from the area between the town and the beach out under the ocean in some cases. As a result of this boom the town's population soared to over 3,000 by 1922. Many of the mines closed following World War II with the last one closing in 2001.

=== Harness racing ===
Inverness Raceway was established in 1926, and harness races are held twice weekly between May and October.

=== Golf courses ===
Canada's only true links golf course, Cabot Links (opened in 2011) is on a site formerly occupied by coalmine shafts, overlooking the beaches and harbour and, as of January 2018, was ranked 43rd in the world by Golf Digest. A newer course north of the community, featuring spectacular cliff views, Cabot Cliffs is ranked 9th.

== Notable people ==
- Allan MacEachen (1921-2017), a former deputy prime minister of Canada
- Alexander MacLeod, short-story writer, born 1972 in Inverness
- Onna White (1922-2005), choreographer and dancer
- Al MacInnis, former professional hockey player, born 1963 in Inverness
- Iain Rankin, former premier of Nova Scotia
- Ranj Pillai, former premier of Yukon
