= Digby (provincial electoral district) =

Former provincial electoral district in Nova Scotia, Canada

Nova Scotia electoral district

Defunct provincial electoral district
- Legislature: Nova Scotia House of Assembly
- District created: 1867
- District abolished: 1993
- Last contested: 1988

Digby was a provincial electoral district in Nova Scotia, Canada, that elected one member of the Nova Scotia House of Assembly. It existed from 1867 to 1993. In 1993, it was dissolved into Digby-Annapolis.

From 1867 to 1949, the district included all of Digby County. After 1949, the Municipality of Clare received its own electoral district. From 1949 to 1993, the district included the town of Digby and the Municipality of Digby.

== Members of the Legislative Assembly ==
This riding has elected the following members of the Legislative Assembly:

| Legislature | Years | Member | Party |
|---|---|---|---|---|---|
| 55th | 1988–1993 | Joseph H. Casey | Liberal |
| 54th | 1984–1988 | Merryl Lawton | Progressive Conservative |
| 53rd | 1981–1984 | Joseph H. Casey | Liberal |
| 52nd | 1978–1981 | Joseph H. Casey | Liberal |
| 51st | 1974–1978 | Joseph H. Casey | Liberal |
| 50th | 1970–1974 | Joseph H. Casey | Liberal |
| 49th | 1967–1970 | Robert Baden Powell | Progressive Conservative |
| 48th | 1963–1967 | Robert Baden Powell | Progressive Conservative |
| 47th | 1960–1963 | Victor Cardoza | Liberal |
| 46th | 1956–1960 | Malcolm Stewart Leonard | Progressive Conservative |
| 45th | 1953–1956 | Victor Cardoza | Liberal |
| 44th | 1949–1953 | E. Keith Potter | Progressive Conservative |
| 43rd | 1945–1949 | Joseph William Comeau | Liberal |
| 42nd | 1941–1945 | Joseph William Comeau | Liberal |
| 41st | 1937–1941 | Joseph William Comeau | Liberal |
| 40th | 1933–1937 | Joseph William Comeau | Liberal |
Digby returned two members before 1933
| 39th | 1928–1933 | Joseph William Comeau | Liberal | Alexander Stirling MacMillan | Liberal |
| 38th | 1925–1928 | Jean-Louis Philippe Robicheau | Liberal-Conservative | William Hudson Farnham | Liberal-Conservative |
| 37th | 1920–1925 | Henry Ward Beecher Warner | Liberal | Joseph William Comeau | Liberal |
| 36th | 1916–1920 | Henry Ward Beecher Warner | Liberal | Joseph William Comeau | Liberal |
| 35th | 1911–1916 | Harry Hatheway Marshall | Liberal-Conservative | Joseph William Comeau | Liberal |
| 35th | 1911 | Allan Ellsworth Wall | Liberal | Joseph William Comeau | Liberal |
| 34th | 1910-1911 | Allan Ellsworth Wall | Liberal | Joseph William Comeau | Liberal |
| 34th | 1907–1910 | Angus Morrison Gidney | Liberal | Joseph William Comeau | Liberal |
| 34th | 1906–1907 | Angus Morrison Gidney | Liberal | Ambroise-Hilaire Comeau | Liberal |
| 33rd | 1901–1906 | Angus Morrison Gidney | Liberal | Ambroise-Hilaire Comeau | Liberal |
| 32nd | 1897–1901 | Angus Morrison Gidney | Liberal | Ambroise-Hilaire Comeau | Liberal |
| 31st | 1895–1897 | Angus Morrison Gidney | Liberal | Ambroise-Hilaire Comeau | Liberal |
| 31st | 1894–1895 | Eliakim Tupper | Liberal | Ambroise-Hilaire Comeau | Liberal |
| 30th | 1890–1894 | Eliakim Tupper | Liberal | Ambroise-Hilaire Comeau | Liberal |
| 29th | 1886–1890 | Henri M. Robicheau | Liberal | John S. McNeill | Liberal |
| 28th | 1882–1886 | Henri M. Robicheau | Liberal | John S. McNeill | Liberal |
| 27th | 1878–1882 | Henri M. Robicheau | Liberal | Benjamin Van Blarcom | Liberal-Conservative |
| 26th | 1874–1878 | Henri M. Robicheau | Liberal | Colin Campbell | Liberal |
| 25th | 1871–1874 | William Berrian Vail | Liberal | Urbine Doucett | Liberal |
| 24th | 1867–1871 | William Berrian Vail | Liberal | Urbine Doucett | Liberal |

== Election results ==
=== 1988 ===
1988 Nova Scotia general election
| Party | Candidate | Votes | % | ±% |
|---|---|---|---|---|
| Liberal | Joseph H. Casey | 3,514 | 52.87% | 23.75% |
| Progressive Conservative | Maxine Connell | 2,687 | 40.43% | -20.23% |
| New Democratic | Susan Jamieson | 445 | 6.70% | -3.52% |
| Total | | 6,646 | – | |
Source(s) Source: Nova Scotia Legislature (2024). "Electoral History for Digby" (PDF). nslegislature.ca. Nova Scotia, Chief Electoral Officer (1988). Returns of the General Election for the House of Assembly, Thirty-Second General Election (PDF) (Report). Queen's Printer. Archived from the original (PDF) on 7 July 2018.

=== 1984 ===
1984 Nova Scotia general election
| Party | Candidate | Votes | % | ±% |
|---|---|---|---|---|
| Progressive Conservative | Merryl Lawton | 3,451 | 60.66% | 18.96% |
| Liberal | Paul Scovil | 1,657 | 29.13% | -16.91% |
| New Democratic | Susan Jamieson | 581 | 10.21% | -2.05% |
| Total | | 5,689 | – | |
Source(s) Source: Nova Scotia Legislature (2024). "Electoral History for Digby" (PDF). nslegislature.ca. Nova Scotia, Chief Electoral Officer (1984). Returns of the General Election for the House of Assembly, Thirty-First General Election (PDF) (Report). Queen's Printer. Archived from the original (PDF) on 31 July 2017.

=== 1981 ===
1981 Nova Scotia general election
| Party | Candidate | Votes | % | ±% |
|---|---|---|---|---|
| Liberal | Joseph H. Casey | 2,918 | 46.04% | -5.52% |
| Progressive Conservative | John Comeau | 2,643 | 41.70% | -2.33% |
| New Democratic | Bill Redden | 777 | 12.26% | 7.84% |
| Total | | 6,338 | – | |
Source(s) Source: Nova Scotia Legislature (2024). "Electoral History for Digby" (PDF). nslegislature.ca. Nova Scotia, Chief Electoral Officer (1981). Returns of the General Election for the House of Assembly, Thirtieth General Election (PDF) (Report). Queen's Printer. Archived from the original (PDF) on 31 July 2017.

=== 1978 ===
1978 Nova Scotia general election
| Party | Candidate | Votes | % | ±% |
|---|---|---|---|---|
| Liberal | Joseph H. Casey | 3,048 | 51.56% | -14.34% |
| Progressive Conservative | John Comeau | 2,603 | 44.03% | 14.30% |
| New Democratic | John Gray | 261 | 4.41% | 0.04% |
| Total | | 5,912 | – | |
Source(s) Source: Nova Scotia Legislature (2024). "Electoral History for Digby" (PDF). nslegislature.ca. Nova Scotia, Chief Electoral Officer (1978). Returns of the General Election for the House of Assembly, Twenty-Ninth General Election (PDF) (Report). Queen's Printer. Archived from the original (PDF) on 18 June 2018.

=== 1974 ===
1974 Nova Scotia general election
| Party | Candidate | Votes | % | ±% |
|---|---|---|---|---|
| Liberal | Joseph H. Casey | 3,525 | 65.90% | 8.36% |
| Progressive Conservative | John (Jack) R. Nichols | 1,590 | 29.73% | -12.73% |
| New Democratic | Caleb Barry Haight | 234 | 4.37% | – |
| Total | | 5,349 | – | |
Source(s) Source: Nova Scotia Legislature (2024). "Electoral History for Digby" (PDF). nslegislature.ca. Nova Scotia, Chief Electoral Officer (1974). Returns of the General Election for the House of Assembly, Twenty-Eighth General Election (PDF) (Report). Queen's Printer. Archived from the original (PDF) on 18 June 2018.

=== 1970 ===
1970 Nova Scotia general election
| Party | Candidate | Votes | % | ±% |
|---|---|---|---|---|
| Liberal | Joseph H. Casey | 2,903 | 57.54% | 8.85% |
| Progressive Conservative | Gifford W. Lewis | 2,142 | 42.46% | -8.85% |
| Total | | 5,045 | – | |
Source(s) Source: Nova Scotia Legislature (2024). "Electoral History for Digby" (PDF). nslegislature.ca. Nova Scotia, Legislative Assembly (1970). Returns of the General Election for the House of Assembly, 1970 (PDF) (Report). Queen's Printer. Archived from the original (PDF) on 25 July 2018.

=== 1967 ===
1967 Nova Scotia general election
| Party | Candidate | Votes | % | ±% |
|---|---|---|---|---|
| Progressive Conservative | Robert Baden Powell | 2,524 | 51.31% | -0.92% |
| Liberal | Phillip R. Woolaver | 2,395 | 48.69% | 2.19% |
| Total | | 4,919 | – | |
Source(s) Source: Nova Scotia Legislature (2024). "Electoral History for Digby" (PDF). nslegislature.ca. Nova Scotia Legislature (1967). Returns of the General Election for the House of Assembly (PDF) (Report). Queen's Printer. Archived from the original (PDF) on 25 July 2018.

=== 1963 ===
1963 Nova Scotia general election
| Party | Candidate | Votes | % | ±% |
|---|---|---|---|---|
| Progressive Conservative | Robert Baden Powell | 2,671 | 52.23% | 4.08% |
| Liberal | Victor Cardoza | 2,378 | 46.50% | -2.73% |
| New Democratic | Louis A. Beeler | 65 | 1.27% | -1.35% |
| Total | | 5,114 | – | |
Source(s) Source: Nova Scotia Legislature (2024). "Electoral History for Digby" (PDF). nslegislature.ca. Nova Scotia Legislature (1963). Returns of the General Election for the House of Assembly (PDF) (Report). Queen's Printer. Archived from the original (PDF) on 25 July 2018.

=== 1960 ===
1960 Nova Scotia general election
| Party | Candidate | Votes | % | ±% |
|---|---|---|---|---|
| Liberal | Victor Cardoza | 2,651 | 49.23% | 0.58% |
| Progressive Conservative | E. Keith Potter | 2,593 | 48.15% | -3.20% |
| Co-operative Commonwealth | Journeay Foster | 141 | 2.62% | – |
| Total | | 5,385 | – | |
Source(s) Source: Nova Scotia Legislature (2024). "Electoral History for Digby" (PDF). nslegislature.ca. Nova Scotia Legislature (1960). Returns of the General Election for the House of Assembly (PDF) (Report). Queen's Printer. Archived from the original (PDF) on 25 July 2018.

=== 1956 ===
1956 Nova Scotia general election
| Party | Candidate | Votes | % | ±% |
|---|---|---|---|---|
| Progressive Conservative | Malcolm Stewart Leonard | 2,701 | 51.35% | 3.75% |
| Liberal | Victor Cardoza | 2,559 | 48.65% | -3.75% |
| Total | | 5,260 | – | |
Source(s) Source: Nova Scotia Legislature (2024). "Electoral History for Digby" (PDF). nslegislature.ca. Nova Scotia Legislature (1956). Returns of the General Election for the House of Assembly (PDF) (Report). Queen's Printer. Archived from the original (PDF) on 10 September 2018.

=== 1953 ===
1953 Nova Scotia general election
| Party | Candidate | Votes | % | ±% |
|---|---|---|---|---|
| Liberal | Victor Cardoza | 2,770 | 52.40% | 3.14% |
| Progressive Conservative | Malcolm Stewart Leonard | 2,516 | 47.60% | -3.14% |
| Total | | 5,286 | – | |
Source(s) Source: Nova Scotia Legislature (2024). "Electoral History for Digby" (PDF). nslegislature.ca. Nova Scotia Legislature (1953). Returns of the General Election for the House of Assembly (PDF) (Report). Queen's Printer. Archived from the original (PDF) on 10 September 2018.

=== 1949 ===
1949 Nova Scotia general election
| Party | Candidate | Votes | % | ±% |
|---|---|---|---|---|
| Progressive Conservative | E. Keith Potter | 2,830 | 50.74% | 16.79% |
| Liberal | Blanchard Spring Morrell | 2,748 | 49.26% | -9.87% |
| Total | | 5,578 | – | |
Source(s) Source: Nova Scotia Legislature (2024). "Electoral History for Digby" (PDF). nslegislature.ca. Nova Scotia Legislature (1949). Returns of the General Election for the House of Assembly (PDF) (Report). Queen's Printer. Archived from the original (PDF) on 10 September 2018.

=== 1945 ===
1945 Nova Scotia general election
| Party | Candidate | Votes | % | ±% |
|---|---|---|---|---|
| Liberal | Joseph William Comeau | 4,714 | 59.13% | -3.21% |
| Progressive Conservative | Kenneth Earl Smith | 2,706 | 33.94% | -3.71% |
| Co-operative Commonwealth | Edgar Lawrence Outhouse | 552 | 6.92% | – |
| Total | | 7,972 | – | |
Source(s) Source: Nova Scotia Legislature (2024). "Electoral History for Digby" (PDF). nslegislature.ca. Nova Scotia Legislature (1945). Returns of the General Election for the House of Assembly (PDF) (Report). Queen's Printer. Archived from the original (PDF) on 10 September 2018.

=== 1941 ===
1941 Nova Scotia general election
| Party | Candidate | Votes | % | ±% |
|---|---|---|---|---|
| Liberal | Joseph William Comeau | 4,818 | 62.34% | 4.15% |
| Progressive Conservative | James John Wallis | 2,910 | 37.66% | -4.15% |
| Total | | 7,728 | – | |
Source(s) Source: Nova Scotia Legislature (2024). "Electoral History for Digby" (PDF). nslegislature.ca. Nova Scotia Legislature (1941). Returns of the General Election for the House of Assembly (PDF) (Report). Queen's Printer. Archived from the original (PDF) on 8 February 2024.

=== 1937 ===
1937 Nova Scotia general election
| Party | Candidate | Votes | % | ±% |
|---|---|---|---|---|
| Liberal | Joseph William Comeau | 5,179 | 58.19% | -1.00% |
| Progressive Conservative | Edward Brenette Pugh | 3,721 | 41.81% | – |
| Total | | 8,900 | – | |
Source(s) Source: Nova Scotia Legislature (2024). "Electoral History for Digby" (PDF). nslegislature.ca. Nova Scotia Legislature (1937). Returns of the General Election for the House of Assembly (PDF) (Report). Queen's Printer. Archived from the original (PDF) on 1 March 2019.

=== 1933 ===
1933 Nova Scotia general election
| Party | Candidate | Votes | % | ±% |
|---|---|---|---|---|
| Liberal | Joseph William Comeau | 5,372 | 59.20% | 5.60% |
| Liberal-Conservative | Jean-Louis Philippe Robicheau | 3,703 | 40.80% | -5.60% |
| Total | | 9,075 | – | |
Source(s) Source: Nova Scotia Legislature (2024). "Electoral History for Digby" (PDF). nslegislature.ca. Nova Scotia Legislature (1933). Returns of the General Election for the House of Assembly (PDF) (Report). Queen's Printer. Archived from the original (PDF) on 1 March 2019.

=== 1928 ===
1928 Nova Scotia general election
| Party | Candidate | Votes | % | Elected |
|---|---|---|---|---|
| Liberal | Joseph William Comeau | 3,763 | 27.55% | ✓ |
| Liberal | Alexander Stirling MacMillan | 3,557 | 26.04% | ✓ |
| Liberal-Conservative | H. E. Wagner | 3,213 | 23.52% | |
| Liberal-Conservative | Jean-Louis Philippe Robicheau | 3,125 | 22.88% | |
| Total | | 13,658 | – | |
Source(s) Source: Nova Scotia Legislature (2024). "Electoral History for Digby" (PDF). nslegislature.ca.

=== 1925 ===
1925 Nova Scotia general election
| Party | Candidate | Votes | % | Elected |
|---|---|---|---|---|
| Liberal-Conservative | William Hudson Farnham | 3,862 | 30.27% | ✓ |
| Liberal-Conservative | Jean-Louis Philippe Robicheau | 3,827 | 30.00% | ✓ |
| Liberal | Henry Ward Beecher Warner | 2,545 | 19.95% | |
| Liberal | Gilbert J. Belliveau | 2,524 | 19.78% | |
| Total | | 12,758 | – | |
Source(s) Source: Nova Scotia Legislature (2024). "Electoral History for Digby" (PDF). nslegislature.ca.

=== 1920 ===
1920 Nova Scotia general election
| Party | Candidate | Votes | % | Elected |
|---|---|---|---|---|
| Liberal | Joseph William Comeau | 3,165 | 32.67% | ✓ |
| Liberal | Henry Ward Beecher Warner | 2,997 | 30.93% | ✓ |
| United Farmers | Glidden Campbell | 1,835 | 18.94% | |
| United Farmers | Emede Robicheau | 1,692 | 17.46% | |
| Total | | 9,689 | – | |
Source(s) Source: Nova Scotia Legislature (2024). "Electoral History for Digby" (PDF). nslegislature.ca.

=== 1916 ===
1916 Nova Scotia general election
| Party | Candidate | Votes | % | Elected |
|---|---|---|---|---|
| Liberal | Joseph William Comeau | 2,002 | 28.20% | ✓ |
| Liberal | Henry Ward Beecher Warner | 1,903 | 26.81% | ✓ |
| Liberal-Conservative | Felix M. Gaudet | 1,604 | 22.59% | |
| Liberal-Conservative | Walton K. Tibert | 1,590 | 22.40% | |
| Total | | 7,099 | – | |
Source(s) Source: Nova Scotia Legislature (2024). "Electoral History for Digby" (PDF). nslegislature.ca.

=== 1911 ===
Nova Scotia provincial by-election, 1911-11-15
| Party | Candidate | Votes | % | Elected |
|---|---|---|---|---|
| Liberal-Conservative | Harry Hatheway Marshall | 1,886 | 57.50% | ✓ |
| Liberal | Allan Ellsworth Wall | 1,394 | 42.50% | |
| Total | | 3,280 | – | |
Source(s) Source: Nova Scotia Legislature (2024). "Electoral History for Digby" (PDF). nslegislature.ca.

=== 1911 ===
1911 Nova Scotia general election
| Party | Candidate | Votes | % | Elected |
|---|---|---|---|---|
| Liberal | Joseph William Comeau | 1,892 | 28.09% | ✓ |
| Liberal | Allan Ellsworth Wall | 1,855 | 27.54% | ✓ |
| Liberal-Conservative | Harry Hatheway Marshall | 1,599 | 23.74% | |
| Liberal-Conservative | F. P. Deveau | 1,389 | 20.62% | |
| Total | | 6,735 | – | |
Source(s) Source: Nova Scotia Legislature (2024). "Electoral History for Digby" (PDF). nslegislature.ca.

=== 1910 ===
Nova Scotia provincial by-election, 1910-11-15
| Party | Candidate | Votes | % | Elected |
|---|---|---|---|---|
| Liberal | Allan Ellsworth Wall | 1,891 | 54.25% | ✓ |
| Liberal-Conservative | William F. Van Blakeman | 1,595 | 45.75% | |
| Total | | 3,486 | – | |
Source(s) Source: Nova Scotia Legislature (2024). "Electoral History for Digby" (PDF). nslegislature.ca.

=== 1907 ===
Nova Scotia provincial by-election, 1907-02-19
| Party | Candidate | Votes | % | Elected |
|---|---|---|---|---|
| Liberal | Joseph William Comeau | acclaimed | N/A | ✓ |
| Total | | | – | |
Source(s) Source: Nova Scotia Legislature (2024). "Electoral History for Digby" (PDF). nslegislature.ca.

=== 1906 ===
1906 Nova Scotia general election
| Party | Candidate | Votes | % | Elected |
|---|---|---|---|---|
| Liberal | Ambroise-Hilaire Comeau | 1,376 | 32.51% | ✓ |
| Liberal | Angus Morrison Gidney | 1,253 | 29.61% | ✓ |
| Liberal-Conservative | Harry Hatheway Marshall | 829 | 19.59% | |
| Liberal-Conservative | A. A. Theriault | 774 | 18.29% | |
| Total | | 4,232 | – | |
Source(s) Source: Nova Scotia Legislature (2024). "Electoral History for Digby" (PDF). nslegislature.ca.

=== 1901 ===
1901 Nova Scotia general election
| Party | Candidate | Votes | % | Elected |
|---|---|---|---|---|
| Liberal | Ambroise-Hilaire Comeau | 1,507 | 37.12% | ✓ |
| Liberal | Angus Morrison Gidney | 1,400 | 34.48% | ✓ |
| Liberal-Conservative | J. K. Tobin | 611 | 15.05% | |
| Liberal-Conservative | Louis Dugas | 542 | 13.35% | |
| Total | | 4,060 | – | |
Source(s) Source: Nova Scotia Legislature (2024). "Electoral History for Digby" (PDF). nslegislature.ca.

=== 1897 ===
1897 Nova Scotia general election
| Party | Candidate | Votes | % | Elected |
|---|---|---|---|---|
| Liberal | Ambroise-Hilaire Comeau | 1,512 | 31.43% | ✓ |
| Liberal | Angus Morrison Gidney | 1,498 | 31.14% | ✓ |
| Liberal-Conservative | Frank E. Comeau | 940 | 19.54% | |
| Liberal-Conservative | M. R. Timpany | 860 | 17.88% | |
| Total | | 4,810 | – | |
Source(s) Source: Nova Scotia Legislature (2024). "Electoral History for Digby" (PDF). nslegislature.ca.

=== 1895 ===
Nova Scotia provincial by-election, 1895-09-28
| Party | Candidate | Votes | % | Elected |
|---|---|---|---|---|
| Liberal | Angus Morrison Gidney | 1,184 | 61.03% | ✓ |
| Liberal-Conservative | Frank Jones | 756 | 38.97% | |
| Total | | 1,940 | – | |
Source(s) Source: Nova Scotia Legislature (2024). "Electoral History for Digby" (PDF). nslegislature.ca.

=== 1894 ===
1894 Nova Scotia general election
| Party | Candidate | Votes | % | Elected |
|---|---|---|---|---|
| Liberal | Eliakim Tupper | 1,245 | 27.92% | ✓ |
| Liberal | Ambroise-Hilaire Comeau | 1,228 | 27.54% | ✓ |
| Liberal-Conservative | Louis Dugan | 1,018 | 22.83% | |
| Liberal-Conservative | M. R. Timpany | 968 | 21.71% | |
| Total | | 4,459 | – | |
Source(s) Source: Nova Scotia Legislature (2024). "Electoral History for Digby" (PDF). nslegislature.ca.

=== 1890 ===
1890 Nova Scotia general election
| Party | Candidate | Votes | % | Elected |
|---|---|---|---|---|
| Liberal | Ambroise-Hilaire Comeau | 1,207 | 26.57% | ✓ |
| Liberal | Eliakim Tupper | 1,179 | 25.96% | ✓ |
| Liberal-Conservative | Robert G. Munroe | 708 | 15.59% | |
| Liberal-Conservative | Daniel LeBlanc | 665 | 14.64% | |
| Liberal | William German | 437 | 9.62% | |
| Liberal | Edward Hogan | 346 | 7.62% | |
| Total | | 4,542 | – | |
Source(s) Source: Nova Scotia Legislature (2024). "Electoral History for Digby" (PDF). nslegislature.ca.

=== 1887 ===
Nova Scotia provincial by-election, 1887-10-25
| Party | Candidate | Votes | % | Elected |
|---|---|---|---|---|
| Liberal | Henri M. Robicheau | 1,031 | 54.99% | ✓ |
| Liberal-Conservative | E. W. Doucet | 844 | 45.01% | |
| Total | | 1,875 | – | |
Source(s) Source: Nova Scotia Legislature (2024). "Electoral History for Digby" (PDF). nslegislature.ca.

=== 1886 ===
1886 Nova Scotia general election
| Party | Candidate | Votes | % | Elected |
|---|---|---|---|---|
| Liberal | Henri M. Robicheau | 1,108 | 42.35% | ✓ |
| Liberal | John S. McNeill | 986 | 37.69% | ✓ |
| Liberal-Conservative | Robert G. Munroe | 522 | 19.95% | |
| Total | | 2,616 | – | |
Source(s) Source: Nova Scotia Legislature (2024). "Electoral History for Digby" (PDF). nslegislature.ca.

=== 1882 ===
1882 Nova Scotia general election
| Party | Candidate | Votes | % | Elected |
|---|---|---|---|---|
| Liberal | Henri M. Robicheau | 1,048 | 29.59% | ✓ |
| Liberal | John S. McNeill | 986 | 27.84% | ✓ |
| Liberal-Conservative | George Taylor | 752 | 21.23% | |
| Liberal-Conservative | Urbine Doucett | 664 | 18.75% | |
| Independent | William Lent | 92 | 2.60% | |
| Total | | 3,542 | – | |
Source(s) Source: Nova Scotia Legislature (2024). "Electoral History for Digby" (PDF). nslegislature.ca.

=== 1878 ===
1878 Nova Scotia general election
| Party | Candidate | Votes | % | Elected |
|---|---|---|---|---|
| Liberal-Conservative | Benjamin Van Blarcom | 833 | 22.80% | ✓ |
| Liberal | Henri M. Robicheau | 830 | 22.72% | ✓ |
| Liberal | Urbine Doucett | 738 | 20.20% | |
| Independent | Colin Campbell | 725 | 19.85% | |
| Liberal | John S. McNeill | 527 | 14.43% | |
| Total | | 3,653 | – | |
Source(s) Source: Nova Scotia Legislature (2024). "Electoral History for Digby" (PDF). nslegislature.ca.

=== 1874 ===
1874 Nova Scotia general election
| Party | Candidate | Votes | % | Elected |
|---|---|---|---|---|
| Anti-Confederation | Colin Campbell | 1,123 | 35.17% | ✓ |
| Liberal | Henri M. Robicheau | 967 | 30.28% | ✓ |
| Liberal-Conservative | John Chipman Wade | 574 | 17.98% | |
| Liberal | Urbine Doucett | 529 | 16.57% | |
| Total | | 3,193 | – | |
Source(s) Source: Nova Scotia Legislature (2024). "Electoral History for Digby" (PDF). nslegislature.ca.

=== 1871 ===
1871 Nova Scotia general election
| Party | Candidate | Votes | % | Elected |
|---|---|---|---|---|
| Liberal | William Berrian Vail | 1,028 | 35.83% | ✓ |
| Liberal | Urbine Doucett | 1,019 | 35.52% | ✓ |
| Liberal-Conservative | Colin Campbell | 721 | 25.13% | |
| Liberal-Conservative | A. Amirault | 101 | 3.52% | |
| Total | | 2,869 | – | |
Source(s) Source: Nova Scotia Legislature (2024). "Electoral History for Digby" (PDF). nslegislature.ca.

=== 1867 ===
1867 Nova Scotia general election
| Party | Candidate | Votes | % | Elected |
|---|---|---|---|---|
| Anti-Confederation | William Berrian Vail | 1,139 | 36.00% | ✓ |
| Anti-Confederation | Urbine Doucett | 1,010 | 31.92% | ✓ |
| Confederation | Colin Campbell | 612 | 19.34% | |
| Confederation | J. Melanson | 403 | 12.74% | |
| Total | | 3,164 | – | |
Source(s) Source: Nova Scotia Legislature (2024). "Electoral History for Digby" (PDF). nslegislature.ca.

== See also ==
- List of Nova Scotia provincial electoral districts
- Canadian provincial electoral districts
