= Alexander Stirling MacMillan =

Premier of Nova Scotia from 1940 to 1945

The Honourable Alexander Stirling MacMillan
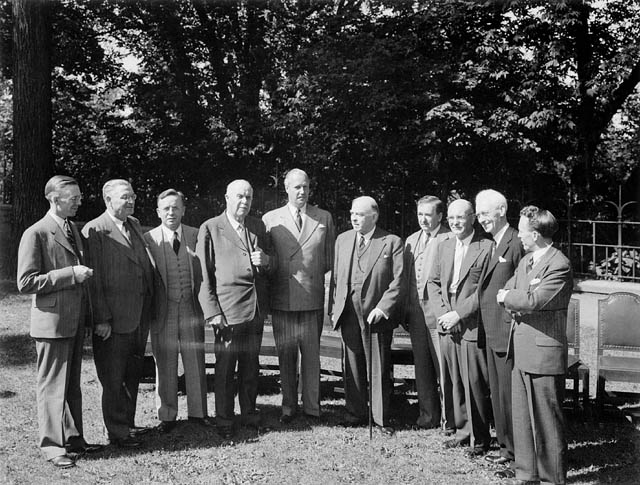
- A.S. MacMillan (4th to the left)

13th Premier of Nova Scotia
- In office July 10, 1940 – September 8, 1945
- Monarch: George VI
- Lieutenant Governor: Frederick F. Mathers; Henry Ernest Kendall
- Preceded by: Angus L. Macdonald
- Succeeded by: Angus L. Macdonald

Member of Legislative Council
- In office June 25, 1925 – September 5, 1928

MLA for Digby County
- In office October 1, 1928 – August 22, 1933 Serving with Joseph Willie Comeau
- Preceded by: William Hudson Farnham; Jean-Louis Philippe Robicheau
- Succeeded by: Joseph Willie Comeau

MLA for Hants
- In office August 22, 1933 – October 23, 1945
- Preceded by: Albert E. Parsons; Edgar Nelson Rhodes
- Succeeded by: Robert A. MacLellan

Personal details
- Born: October 31, 1870 Upper South River, Nova Scotia
- Died: August 7, 1955 (aged 83) Halifax, Nova Scotia
- Party: Liberal
- Occupation: businessman

Alexander S. MacMillan (October 31, 1870 – August 7, 1955) was a Nova Scotia politician and businessman, the 13th premier of Nova Scotia, from 1940 to 1945.

MacMillan was born in Upper South River in Antigonish County. He made his fortune in lumbering and construction before being made chairman of the Nova Scotia Highways Board in 1920 and serving briefly as minister of highways in 1925. He was a member of Nova Scotia's appointed upper house, the Legislative Council from 1925 until 1928 when he won a seat in the Nova Scotia House of Assembly as a Liberal. He again became minister of highways in 1933. In 1940, when Premier Angus L. Macdonald went to Ottawa to serve in the wartime cabinet of William Lyon Mackenzie King, MacMillan became premier in his place. He retired as premier and from politics in 1945 to allow Macdonald to resume his provincial career. MacMillan died in Halifax at the age of 83.
