= Joseph William Comeau =

Canadian politician

The Honourable Jonathan Willie Comeau PC

Senator for Nova Scotia
- In office December 1, 1948 – January 10, 1966
- Appointed by: William Lyon Mackenzie King

MLA for Digby County
- In office February 19, 1907 – June 25, 1925
- Preceded by: Ambroise-Hilaire Comeau
- Succeeded by: William Hudson Farnham; Jean-Louis Philippe Robicheau
- In office October 1, 1928 – June 9, 1949
- Preceded by: William Hudson Farnham; Jean-Louis Philippe Robicheau
- Succeeded by: E. Keith Potter

Personal details
- Born: Joseph William Comeau; March 12, 1876 Comeauville, Nova Scotia, Canada
- Died: January 11, 1966 (aged 89) Yarmouth, Nova Scotia, Canada
- Party: Liberal
- Spouse(s): Grace Sheehan; Zoé Doucet
- Occupation: Fish merchant, teacher

Joseph William (Willie) Comeau PC (March 12, 1876 – January 11, 1966) was a Canadian educator and political figure in Nova Scotia, Canada. He represented Digby County in the Nova Scotia House of Assembly from 1907 to 1925 and from 1928 to 1948 as a Liberal member. Comeau sat for Clare division in the Senate of Canada from 1948 to 1966.

== Early life and education ==
He was born in Comeauville, Nova Scotia, the son of Louis Comeau and Catherine Bourneuf, and was educated at the Collège Sainte-Anne.

== Political career ==
Comeau served as a minister without portfolio in the province's Executive Council from 1911 to 1917, from 1921 to 1925 and from 1933 to 1948. He was a member of the Nova Scotia Legislative Council from 1925 to 1928. Comeau resigned his seat in the provincial assembly in 1917 to run unsuccessfully for a seat in the House of Commons.

== Death ==
He died in office at the age of 89 in Yarmouth.

== Personal life ==
Comeau was married twice: first to Grace Sheehan and then, after her death, to Zoé Doucet. His son, Benoit Comeau served as the MLA for Clare from 1967 to 1981 and his grandson Robert Thibault served in the House of Commons from 2000 to 2008.

== See also ==
- Nova Scotia Heritage Day
