= E. Keith Potter =

Canadian politician

MLA for Digby
- In office 1949–1953
- Preceded by: Joseph William Comeau
- Succeeded by: Victor Cardoza

Personal details
- Born: September 27, 1911 Plympton, Nova Scotia
- Died: February 20, 1980 (aged 68) Sanibel Island, Florida
- Party: Progressive Conservative
- Occupation: lumber operator

Everett Keith Potter (September 27, 1911 – February 20, 1980) was a Canadian politician. He represented the electoral district of Digby in the Nova Scotia House of Assembly from 1949 to 1953. He was a member of the Progressive Conservative Party of Nova Scotia.

== Early life and education ==
Born in 1911 at Plympton, Nova Scotia, Potter was a lumber operator by career. He graduated from Acadia University in 1935.

== Political career ==
Potter entered provincial politics in the 1949 election, winning the Digby riding by 82 votes. He did not reoffer in the 1953 election. Potter attempted to regain the seat in the 1960 election, but lost to Liberal incumbent Victor Cardoza by 58 votes.

== Death ==
Potter died at Sanibel Island, Florida on February 20, 1980.

== Personal life ==
He married Ruberta Rand in 1938.
