= Robert Baden Powell (politician) =

Canadian politician

MLA for Digby
- In office 1963–1970
- Preceded by: Victor Cardoza
- Succeeded by: Joseph H. Casey

Personal details
- Born: May 24, 1901 Westport, Nova Scotia
- Died: September 2, 1976 (aged 75) Plympton, Nova Scotia
- Party: Progressive Conservative
- Occupation: teacher

Robert Baden Powell (May 24, 1901 – September 2, 1976) was a Canadian politician. He represented the electoral district of Digby in the Nova Scotia House of Assembly from 1963 to 1970. He was a member of the Progressive Conservative Party of Nova Scotia.

Born in 1901 at Westport, Nova Scotia, Powell was a graduate of the Nova Scotia Teachers College. He was an industrial arts teacher by career. He married Rae Effie Hankinson in 1933. Powell entered provincial politics in the 1963 election, defeating Liberal incumbent Victor Cardoza by 293 votes in the Digby District. He was re-elected by 129 votes in the 1967 election. He did not reoffer in the 1970 election. Powell died at Plympton, Nova Scotia on September 2, 1976.
