= Henry Ward Beecher Warner =

Canadian politician from Nova Scotia (1874-1953)

Member of the Nova Scotia House of Assembly for Digby County
- In office June 20, 1916 – June 24, 1925

Personal details
- Born: April 8, 1874 Plympton, Nova Scotia
- Died: September 2, 1953 (aged 79) Barton, Nova Scotia
- Party: Liberal
- Spouse: Annie Potter ()
- Occupation: merchant, lumberman, politician

Henry Ward Beecher Warner (April 8, 1874 – September 2, 1953) was a merchant, lumberman, and political figure in Nova Scotia, Canada. He represented Digby County in the Nova Scotia House of Assembly from 1916 to 1925 as a Liberal member. He was a municipal councilor for the Municipality of Digby. Warner died in 1953 in Barton, Nova Scotia. He was elected in the 1916 and the 1920 Nova Scotia general elections, and was unsuccessful in the 1925 election.
