= Clarence Jameson =

Canadian politician

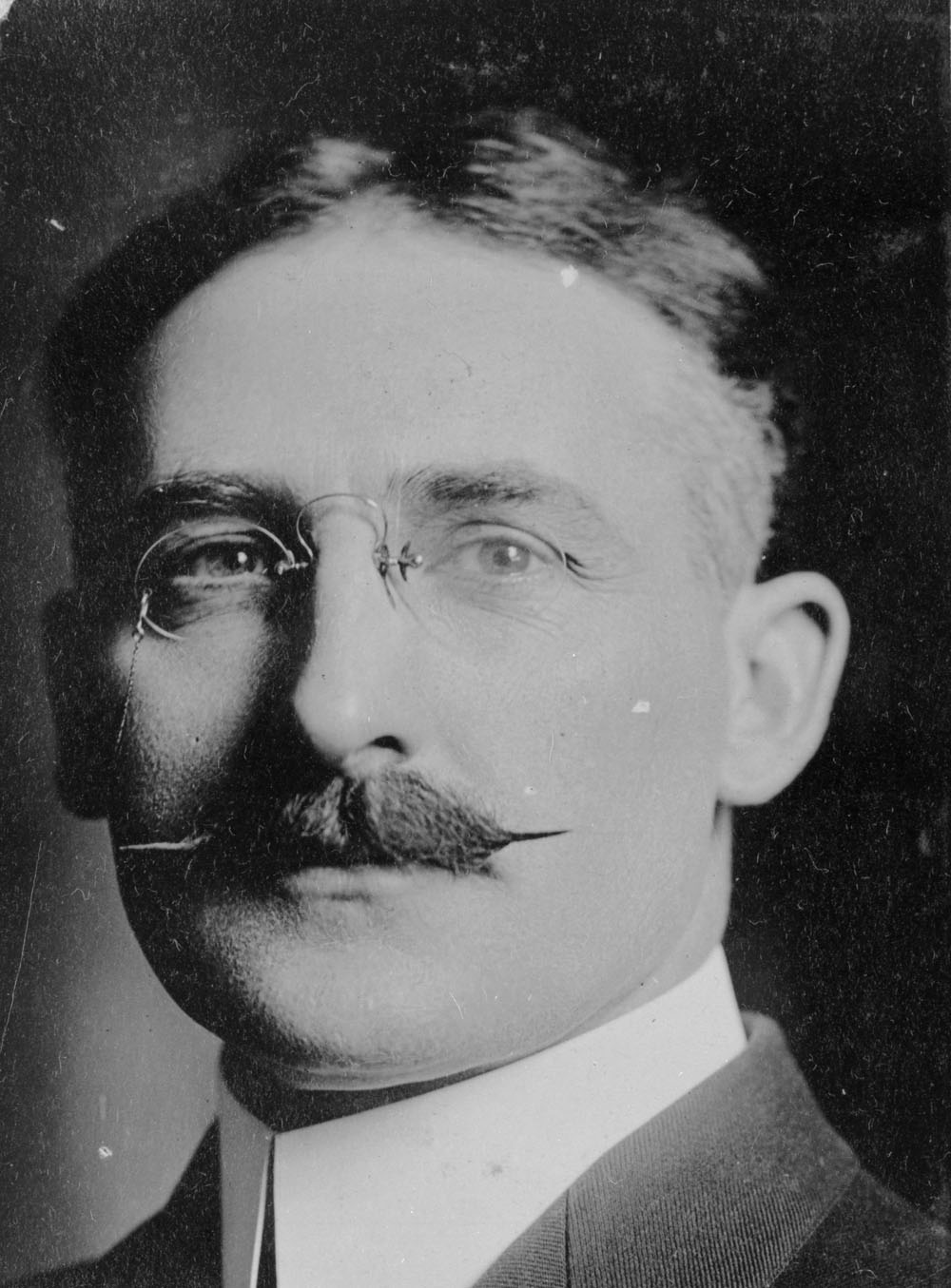
- Jameson, c. 1912

Member of the Canadian Parliament for Digby
- In office 1908–1917
- Preceded by: Albert James Smith Copp
- Succeeded by: District was abolished in 1914

Personal details
- Born: June 12, 1872 Bedeque, Prince Edward Island
- Died: September 20, 1928 (aged 56) Digby, Nova Scotia
- Party: Conservative

Clarence Jameson (June 12, 1872 – September 20, 1928) was a municipal official and political figure in Nova Scotia, Canada. He represented Digby in the House of Commons of Canada from 1908 to 1917 as a Conservative.

He was born in Bedeque, Prince Edward Island, the son of J. H. Jameson and Sophie Shrewe, and was educated at the Prince County Academy. Jameson studied law in Digby. He was town clerk and treasurer for Digby. In 1926, he married Anna MacDonald. Jameson was a Civil Service Commissioner in Ottawa from 1917 to 1926. He died in Digby at the age of 56.

1908 Canadian federal election: Digby
Party	Candidate	Votes
Conservative	Clarence Jameson	1,771
Liberal	Albert James Smith Copp	1,640

1911 Canadian federal election: Digby
Party	Candidate	Votes
Conservative	Clarence Jameson	2,126
Liberal	Allan Ellsworth Wall	1,866
