= Edwin Randolph Oakes =

Canadian politician (1818–1889)

Member of Parliament for Digby
- In office 1874–1874
- Preceded by: Alfred William Savary
- Succeeded by: William Berrian Vail

Personal details
- Born: March 25, 1818 Pleasant Valley, Nova Scotia
- Died: 1889 (aged 70–71)
- Party: Liberal-Conservative Party
- Profession: merchant

Edwin Randolph Oakes (March 25, 1818 in Pleasant Valley, Nova Scotia – August 1889) was a Canadian and Nova Scotian politician and merchant. He was elected to the House of Commons of Canada as a Member of the Liberal-Conservative Party in 1874 to represent the riding of Digby. He resigned later that year when he was appointed to the Legislative Council of Nova Scotia in October 1874.

Oakes was the son of Henry Oakes and Mary Randolph, both descended from United Empire Loyalists from New York state. He was educated in Digby County and became a merchant in Digby. He married Georgina Jane Bragg. He was named to the Legislative Council in 1874. He died in office in 1889.

1874 Canadian federal election: Digby
Party	Candidate	Votes
Liberal–Conservative	E. Oakes	1,168
Conservative	Alfred Savary	631
Source: Canadian Elections Database
