= Herbert Ladd Jones =

Canadian politician (1858–1921)

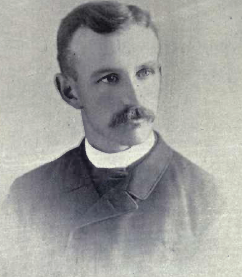

Member of the Canadian Parliament for Digby
- In office 1887–1891
- Preceded by: John Campbell
- Succeeded by: Edward Charles Bowers

Personal details
- Born: January 9, 1858 Weymouth, Nova Scotia
- Died: December 9, 1921 (aged 63)
- Party: Conservative

Herbert Ladd Jones (January 9, 1858 – December 9, 1921) was a Canadian politician.

== Early life and education ==
Born in Weymouth, Nova Scotia, the son of St. Clair Jones and Helen Ladd, Jones was educated at the schools in Weymouth and the Collegiate Institute in Fredericton, graduating in 1875.

== Career ==
He then worked with his father for a time, and, in 1888, entered into partnership with his brothers, carrying on business as general merchants, lumbermen and ship owners. He was elected to the House of Commons of Canada for Digby in the 1887 election held following the death of John Campbell. A Conservative, he was defeated in 1891.

Jones later became an insurance agent.

== Personal life ==
In 1891, he married Kate Dickson Black. He was president of the Weymouth Amateur Athletic Association, secretary for the Weymouth Agricultural Society and was one of the governors for King's College.

Jones' great grandfather was Cereno Upham Jones, who served in the Nova Scotia assembly and as a judge in the Court of Common Pleas.

== Electoral record ==
By-election on 16 July 1887 On Mr. Campbell's death, 26 May 1887
Party	Candidate	Votes
Conservative	Herbert Ladd Jones	1,092
Independent	H.M. Robichon	1,056

1891 Canadian federal election: Digby
Party	Candidate	Votes
Liberal	Edward Charles Bowers	1,503
Conservative	Herbert Ladd Jones	1,430
