= 47th Nova Scotia general election =

The 47th Nova Scotia general election may refer to

- the 1960 Nova Scotia general election, the 46th overall general election for Nova Scotia, for the (due to a counting error in 1859) 47th General Assembly of Nova Scotia, or
- the 1963 Nova Scotia general election, the 47th overall general election for Nova Scotia, for the 48th General Assembly of Nova Scotia, but considered the 25th general election for the Canadian province of Nova Scotia.
