= 46th Nova Scotia general election =

The 46th Nova Scotia general election may refer to

- the 1956 Nova Scotia general election, the 45th overall general election for Nova Scotia, for the (due to a counting error in 1859) 46th General Assembly of Nova Scotia, or
- the 1960 Nova Scotia general election, the 46th overall general election for Nova Scotia, for the 47th General Assembly of Nova Scotia, but considered the 24th general election for the Canadian province of Nova Scotia.
