= Edward Charles Bowers =

Canadian politician (1845–1929)

Member of the Canadian Parliament for Digby
- In office 1891–1896
- Preceded by: Herbert Ladd Jones
- Succeeded by: Albert James Smith Copp

Personal details
- Born: December 15, 1845; Westport, Nova Scotia
- Died: January 19, 1929 (aged 83)
- Political party: Liberal
- Occupation: teacher trader

Edward Charles Bowers (December 15, 1845 – January 19, 1929) was a Canadian politician, teacher and trader. Born in Westport, Colony of Nova Scotia, he was elected to the House of Commons of Canada in 1891 as a Member of the Liberal Party to represent the riding of Digby. He was acclaimed in 1892.
