= Annapolis East =

Former provincial electoral district in Nova Scotia, Canada

Nova Scotia electoral district

Defunct provincial electoral district
- Legislature: Nova Scotia House of Assembly
- District created: 1956
- District abolished: 1993
- Last contested: 1988

Annapolis East was a provincial electoral district in Nova Scotia, Canada, that elected one member of the Nova Scotia House of Assembly and existed from 1956 to 1993. It was created by a division of the former district of Annapolis County into Annapolis East and Annapolis West. Annapolis East included the towns of Bridgetown and Middleton. On the recommendations of the 1992 Electoral Boundaries Commission, the district was abolished and merged into Digby-Annapolis.

== Members of the Legislative Assembly ==
Annapolis East elected the following members to the Legislative Assembly:

Annapolis East
| Legislature | Years | Member | Party |
|---|---|---|---|
District created from Annapolis County (1867–1956)
| 46th | 1956–1960 | Henry Davies Hicks | Liberal |
| 47th | 1960–1963 | Hanson Dowell | Progressive Conservative |
| 48th | 1963–1967 | John Inglis Marshall | Progressive Conservative |
| 49th | 1967–1970 | John Inglis Marshall | Progressive Conservative |
| 50th | 1970–1974 | Gerald Earle Sheehy | Progressive Conservative |
| 51st | 1974–1978 | Gerald Earle Sheehy | Progressive Conservative |
| 52nd | 1978–1981 | Gerald Earle Sheehy | Progressive Conservative |
| 53rd | 1981–1984 | Gerald Earle Sheehy | Progressive Conservative |
| 54th | 1984–1988 | Gerald Earle Sheehy | Progressive Conservative |
| 55th | 1988–1993 | Earle Albert Rayfuse | Liberal |
District dissolved into Digby-Annapolis (1993–2013)

== Election results ==
=== 1988 ===
1988 Nova Scotia general election
| Party | Candidate | Votes | % | ±% |
|---|---|---|---|---|
| Liberal | Earle Rafuse | 3,519 | 48.93% | 18.77% |
| Progressive Conservative | Graham Smith | 3,188 | 44.33% | -11.69% |
| New Democratic | Margaret Wolfe | 485 | 6.74% | -7.08% |
| Total | | 7,192 | – | |
Source(s) Source: Nova Scotia Legislature (2024). "Electoral History for Annapolis East" (PDF). nslegislature.ca. Nova Scotia, Chief Electoral Officer (1988). Returns of the General Election for the House of Assembly, Thirty-Second General Election (PDF) (Report). Queen's Printer. Archived from the original (PDF) on 7 July 2018.

=== 1984 ===
1984 Nova Scotia general election
| Party | Candidate | Votes | % | ±% |
|---|---|---|---|---|
| Progressive Conservative | Gerry Sheehy | 3,736 | 56.02% | -0.38% |
| Liberal | Nita M. Irvine | 2,011 | 30.15% | -0.42% |
| New Democratic | Joan M. Boutilier | 922 | 13.83% | 0.81% |
| Total | | 6,669 | – | |
Source(s) Source: Nova Scotia Legislature (2024). "Electoral History for Annapolis East" (PDF). nslegislature.ca. Nova Scotia, Chief Electoral Officer (1984). Returns of the General Election for the House of Assembly, Thirty-First General Election (PDF) (Report). Queen's Printer. Archived from the original (PDF) on 31 July 2017.

=== 1981 ===
1981 Nova Scotia general election
| Party | Candidate | Votes | % | ±% |
|---|---|---|---|---|
| Progressive Conservative | Gerry Sheehy | 3,700 | 56.40% | -0.48% |
| Liberal | Hugh Laurence | 2,006 | 30.58% | -5.79% |
| New Democratic | Joan M. Boutilier | 854 | 13.02% | 6.27% |
| Total | | 6,560 | – | |
Source(s) Source: Nova Scotia Legislature (2024). "Electoral History for Annapolis East" (PDF). nslegislature.ca. Nova Scotia, Chief Electoral Officer (1981). Returns of the General Election for the House of Assembly, Thirtieth General Election (PDF) (Report). Queen's Printer. Archived from the original (PDF) on 31 July 2017.

=== 1978 ===
1978 Nova Scotia general election
| Party | Candidate | Votes | % | ±% |
|---|---|---|---|---|
| Progressive Conservative | Gerry Sheehy | 3,863 | 56.88% | 4.12% |
| Liberal | Carl L. Bruce | 2,470 | 36.37% | -7.11% |
| New Democratic | Roger A. Boutilier | 458 | 6.74% | 2.99% |
| Total | | 6,791 | – | |
Source(s) Source: Nova Scotia Legislature (2024). "Electoral History for Annapolis East" (PDF). nslegislature.ca. Nova Scotia, Chief Electoral Officer (1978). Returns of the General Election for the House of Assembly, Twenty-Ninth General Election (PDF) (Report). Queen's Printer. Archived from the original (PDF) on 18 June 2018.

=== 1974 ===
1974 Nova Scotia general election
| Party | Candidate | Votes | % | ±% |
|---|---|---|---|---|
| Progressive Conservative | Gerry Sheehy | 3,134 | 52.76% | -1.60% |
| Liberal | Hank DeBoer | 2,583 | 43.48% | -2.15% |
| New Democratic | Murray Alton Bent | 223 | 3.75% | – |
| Total | | 5,940 | – | |
Source(s) Source: Nova Scotia Legislature (2024). "Electoral History for Annapolis East" (PDF). nslegislature.ca. Nova Scotia, Chief Electoral Officer (1974). Returns of the General Election for the House of Assembly, Twenty-Eighth General Election (PDF) (Report). Queen's Printer. Archived from the original (PDF) on 18 June 2018.

=== 1970 ===
1970 Nova Scotia general election
| Party | Candidate | Votes | % | ±% |
|---|---|---|---|---|
| Progressive Conservative | Gerry Sheehy | 2,836 | 54.36% | -1.77% |
| Liberal | Lloyd K. Hill | 2,381 | 45.64% | 1.77% |
| Total | | 5,217 | – | |
Source(s) Source: Nova Scotia Legislature (2024). "Electoral History for Annapolis East" (PDF). nslegislature.ca. Nova Scotia, Legislative Assembly (1970). Returns of the General Election for the House of Assembly, 1970 (PDF) (Report). Queen's Printer. Archived from the original (PDF) on 25 July 2018.

=== 1967 ===
1967 Nova Scotia general election
| Party | Candidate | Votes | % | ±% |
|---|---|---|---|---|
| Progressive Conservative | John I. Marshall | 2,866 | 56.13% | -0.27% |
| Liberal | Malcolm Balcom | 2,240 | 43.87% | 1.37% |
| Total | | 5,106 | – | |
Source(s) Source: Nova Scotia Legislature (2024). "Electoral History for Annapolis East" (PDF). nslegislature.ca. Nova Scotia Legislature (1967). Returns of the General Election for the House of Assembly (PDF) (Report). Queen's Printer. Archived from the original (PDF) on 25 July 2018.

=== 1963 ===
1963 Nova Scotia general election
| Party | Candidate | Votes | % | ±% |
|---|---|---|---|---|
| Progressive Conservative | John I. Marshall | 2,962 | 56.40% | 7.70% |
| Liberal | Melbourne P. Armstrong | 2,232 | 42.50% | -6.05% |
| New Democratic | Murray Alton Bent | 58 | 1.10% | -1.66% |
| Total | | 5,252 | – | |
Source(s) Source: Nova Scotia Legislature (2024). "Electoral History for Annapolis East" (PDF). nslegislature.ca. Nova Scotia Legislature (1963). Returns of the General Election for the House of Assembly (PDF) (Report). Queen's Printer. Archived from the original (PDF) on 25 July 2018.

=== 1960 ===
1960 Nova Scotia general election
| Party | Candidate | Votes | % | ±% |
|---|---|---|---|---|
| Progressive Conservative | Hanson Dowell | 2,666 | 48.69% | 4.70% |
| Liberal | Henry Hicks | 2,658 | 48.55% | -6.13% |
| Co-operative Commonwealth | Murray Alton Bent | 151 | 2.76% | 1.42% |
| Total | | 5,475 | – | |
Source(s) Source: Nova Scotia Legislature (2024). "Electoral History for Annapolis East" (PDF). nslegislature.ca. Nova Scotia Legislature (1960). Returns of the General Election for the House of Assembly (PDF) (Report). Queen's Printer. Archived from the original (PDF) on 25 July 2018.

=== 1956 ===
1956 Nova Scotia general election
| Party | Candidate | Votes | % | ±% |
|---|---|---|---|---|
| Liberal | Henry Hicks | 2,830 | 54.68% | – |
| Progressive Conservative | Harry L. Ritcey | 2,277 | 43.99% | – |
| Co-operative Commonwealth | Murray Alton Bent | 69 | 1.33% | – |
| Total | | 5,176 | – | |
Source(s) Source: Nova Scotia Legislature (2024). "Electoral History for Annapolis East" (PDF). nslegislature.ca. Nova Scotia Legislature (1956). Returns of the General Election for the House of Assembly (PDF) (Report). Queen's Printer. Archived from the original (PDF) on 10 September 2018.

== See also ==
- List of Nova Scotia provincial electoral districts
- Canadian provincial electoral districts
