= Gerry Sheehy =

Canadian politician

The Honourable Gerald E. Sheehy ECNS
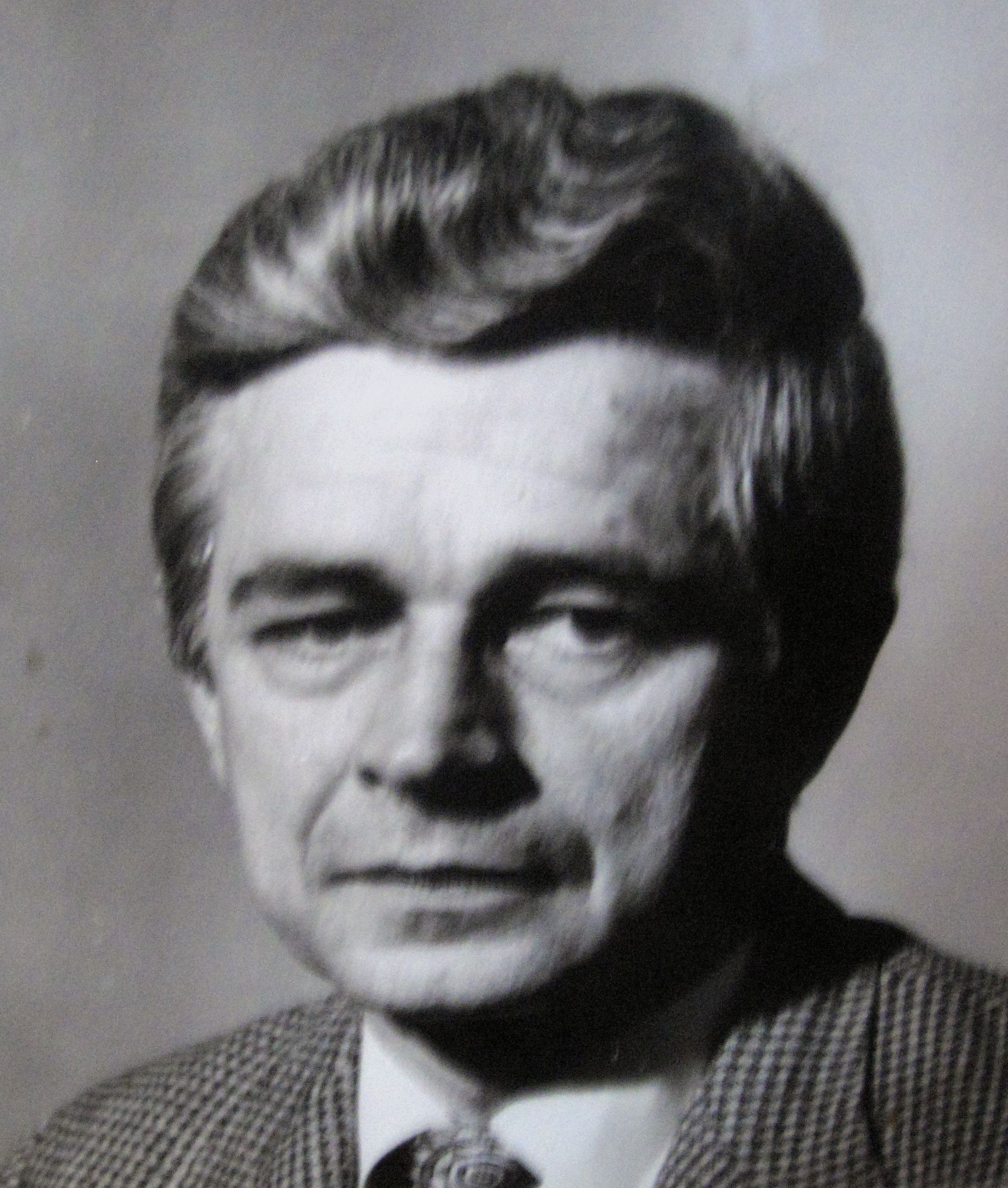

MLA for Annapolis East
- In office 1970–1988
- Preceded by: John Inglis Marshall
- Succeeded by: Earle Rafuse

Personal details
- Born: June 24, 1924 Noel, Nova Scotia
- Died: June 1, 2009 (aged 84) Middleton, Nova Scotia
- Party: Progressive Conservative
- Occupation: Veterinarian

Gerald Earle Sheehy (June 24, 1924 – June 1, 2009) was a Canadian politician. He represented the electoral district of Annapolis East in the Nova Scotia House of Assembly from 1970 to 1988. He was a member of the Progressive Conservative Party of Nova Scotia.

== Early life and education ==
Born in 1924 at Noel, Hants County, Nova Scotia, Sheehy graduated from the University of Toronto and was a veterinarian by career.

== Political career ==
He entered politics in 1965 as a town councillor and deputy mayor in Middleton, Nova Scotia. Sheehy moved to provincial politics in 1970, when he was elected MLA for Annapolis East. He was re-elected in the 1974 election. Sheehy was re-elected by almost 1400 votes in the 1978 election, that resulted in a majority government for the Progressive Conservatives led by John Buchanan.

On October 5, 1978, Buchanan appointed Sheehy to the Executive Council of Nova Scotia as Minister of Agriculture and Marketing and Minister of Health. In June 1979, Buchanan shuffled his cabinet, with Sheehy moving to Registrar General and remaining as Minister of Health. Sheehy was re-elected in the 1981 and 1984 elections. Sheehy continued to serve in cabinet until November 1985, when he asked to be shuffled out for family reasons. He also indicated he would not run in the next election.

== Later life and death ==
Following his political career, he returned to Middleton, where he died on June 1, 2009.
