= John Chipman Wade =

Canadian lawyer and politician (1817–1892)

John Chapman Wade
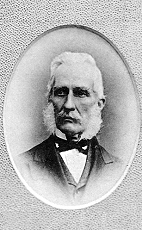

MP for Digby
- In office 1878–1882
- Preceded by: William Berrian Vail
- Succeeded by: William Berrian Vail

MLA for Digby County
- In office 1851–1867

Speaker of the Nova Scotia House of Assembly
- In office 1863–1867
- Preceded by: Stewart Campbell
- Succeeded by: John Joseph Marshall

Personal details
- Born: 1817 Granville, Nova Scotia
- Died: July 9, 1892 (aged 74–75)
- Party: historical Conservative Party
- Profession: lawyer

John Chipman Wade (1817 – July 9, 1892) was a Canadian politician and lawyer who served in both the Nova Scotia House of Assembly and the House of Commons of Canada.

The son of John Wade and Harriet Chipman, Wade was born in Granville, Nova Scotia and educated at Annapolis Royal. He was called to the Nova Scotia bar in 1840. In 1842, Wade married Caroline Viets, the daughter of the Reverend Roger Viets. He represented Digby County in the provincial assembly from 1851 to 1867 and served as speaker for the assembly from 1864 to 1867. Wade supported Confederation which led to his defeat when he ran for reelection to the provincial assembly in 1867. He was named Queen's Counsel in 1867. Wade was elected as a Member of the historical Conservative Party in 1878 to the House of Commons in the riding of Digby in a by-election and re-elected in 1878. He was defeated in the election of 1882.

1867 Canadian federal election: Digby
Party	Candidate	Votes
Anti-Confederation	Alfred William Savary	792
Liberal–Conservative	John Chipman Wade	497
Unknown	William Mehan	362

1878 Canadian federal election: Digby
Party	Candidate	Votes
Conservative	John Chipman Wade	1,019
Unknown	P.W. Smith	1,001
Source: Canadian Elections Database

1882 Canadian federal election: Digby
Party	Candidate	Votes
Liberal	William Berrian Vail	1,123
Conservative	John Chipman Wade	871
