= Hanson Dowell =

Canadian ice hockey administrator and politician (1906–2000)

Nova Scotia House of Assembly member for Annapolis East
- In office June 7, 1960 – February 1962
- Preceded by: Henry Hicks
- Succeeded by: John I. Marshall

Personal details
- Born: September 14, 1906 Stewiacke, Nova Scotia, Canada
- Died: September 23, 2000 (aged 94) Middleton, Nova Scotia, Canada
- Party: Progressive Conservative
- Education: Nova Scotia Teachers College; Dalhousie Law School
- Occupation: Politician, judge, lawyer, teacher
- Known for: President of the Canadian Amateur Hockey Association and the Maritime Amateur Hockey Association
- Awards: Nova Scotia Sport Hall of Fame; Queen's Counsel

Hanson Taylor Dowell QC (September 14, 1906 – September 23, 2000) was a Canadian ice hockey administrator and politician. He served as president of the Canadian Amateur Hockey Association from 1945 to 1947, and was the first person from the Maritimes to serve on the national executive. He sought to have the Canadian definition of amateur recognized at the World Championships and the Olympic Games for the benefit of Canada's national team, and negotiated the merger of the International Ice Hockey Association into the Ligue Internationale de Hockey sur Glace. He served as president of the Maritime Amateur Hockey Association from 1936 to 1940, and later as treasurer of the Maritimes and the Nova Scotia Hockey Associations for a combined 30 years.

Dowell was a graduate of Dalhousie Law School and practiced law for 31 years in Middleton, Nova Scotia. He was elected to the Nova Scotia House of Assembly as a Conservative Party member for Annapolis East, then resigned his seat when appointed a stipendiary magistrate. He was later elevated to judge on the trial division of the Nova Scotia Supreme Court, and was one of the founding members of the Western Counties Bar Association. He was among the first recipients of the Order of Merit established by the Canadian Amateur Hockey Association in 1962, was named a Queen's Counsel in recognition of his legal career, and was inducted into the builder category of Nova Scotia Sport Hall of Fame in 1980.

== Early life and education ==
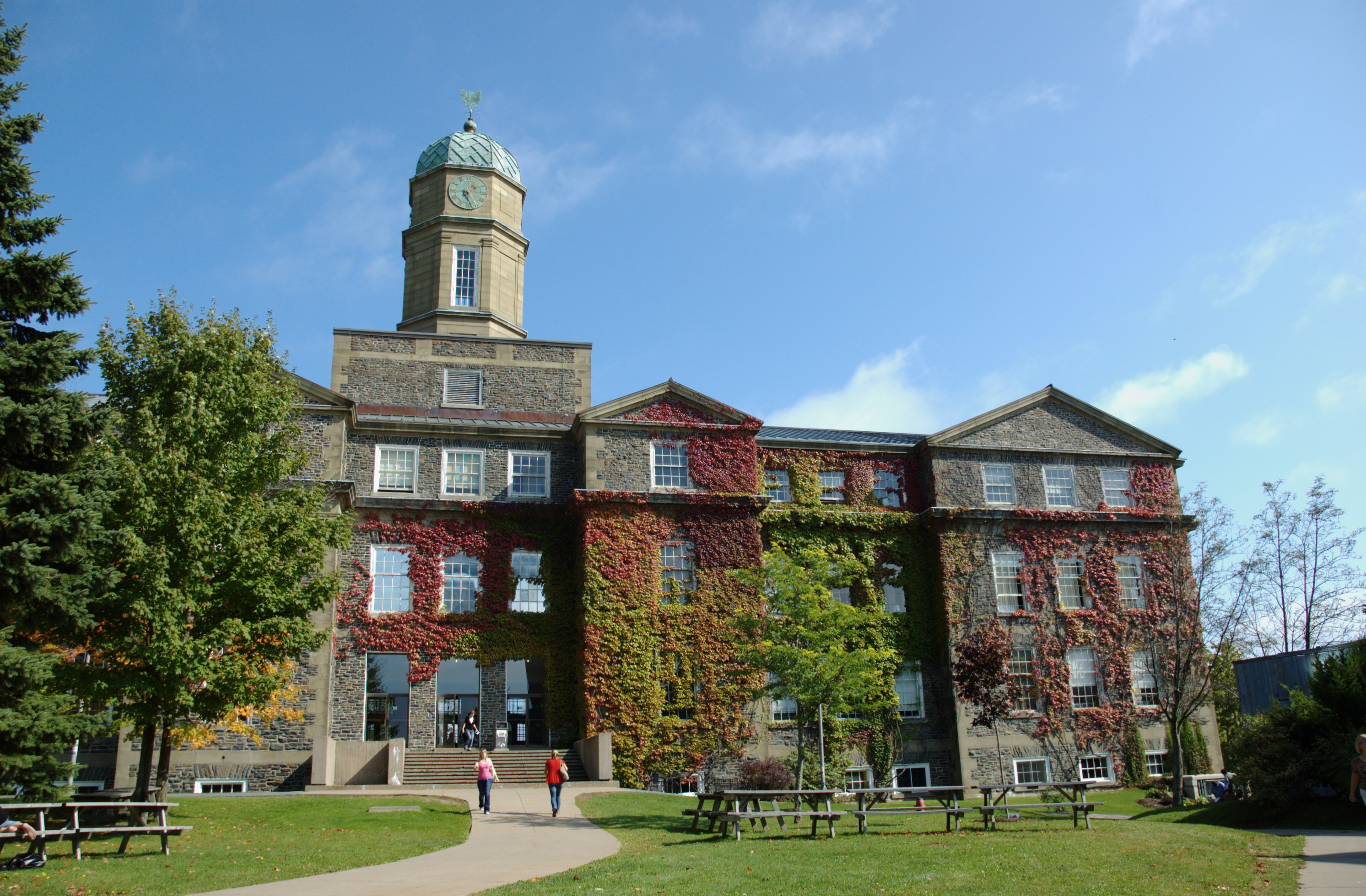
Dalhousie University, Halifax

Hanson Taylor Dowell was born on September 14, 1906, in Stewiacke, Nova Scotia, to parents George and Elizabeth Dowell. He completed elementary school in Elmsdale, and secondary school at the Halifax Christian Academy, then graduated from the Nova Scotia Teachers College in 1924. He was a schoolteacher in Nova Scotia during the late 1920s and spent a summer as a lay preacher in Alberta.

Dowell graduated from Dalhousie Law School with a Bachelor of Laws degree in 1930. He was called to the bar on June 13, 1930, then relocated to Middleton where he practiced law from 1931 to 1962.

== Early hockey career ==
Dowell soon became involved in senior ice hockey in the Annapolis Valley and was an officer with the Central Valley Hockey League during the 1935–36 season. He expanded his hockey involvement beyond Nova Scotia and served as president of Maritime Amateur Hockey Association (MAHA) from 1936 to 1940.

The Canadian Amateur Hockey Association (CAHA) which oversaw amateur hockey in Canada was in the process of modernizing its definition of an amateur and semi-professionalizing the game, compared to the older definition of pure amateurism supported by the Amateur Athletic Union of Canada (AAU of C). CAHA president Cecil Duncan announced that the CAHA would break away from the AAU of C effective January 15, 1937, in response to the rejection of the CAHA's "four points" in updating the definition of an amateur.

The four points were:

1. Hockey players may capitalize on their ability as hockey players for the purpose of obtaining legitimate employment.
2. Hockey players may accept from their clubs or employers payment for time lost, from work while competing on behalf of their clubs. They will not however, be allowed to hold "shadow" jobs under the clause.
3. Amateur hockey teams may play exhibition games against professional teams under such conditions as may be laid down by the individual branches of the CAHA.
4. Professionals in another sport will be allowed to play under the CAHA jurisdiction as amateurs.

Dowell initially made no indication to support the new definition of an amateur and discussed the issue with fellow MAHA organizers, who subsequently voted in favour of remaining with the CAHA and breaking away from the AAU of C. The Halifax Senior Hockey League chose to remain with the AAU of C, and play outside of the MAHA's jurisdiction.

Dowell was named to the CAHA's resolutions committee in 1937. He recommended changing the Allan Cup playoffs between the MAHA and the Quebec Amateur Hockey Association (QAHA) in 1939 and onwards, from a best-of-three format into a best-of-five format. The change would allow spectators in the Maritimes to see at least two games of the series, with the remaining games played in Montreal to increase ticket sales. Dowell also sought for Allan Cup finals games to be hosted locally if a team from the Maritimes were the Eastern Canada champion.

In 1939, Dowell argued for an extension to the deadline to establish residency, and stated that many teams in the Maritimes depended on natural ice surfaces and few leagues began play before January. The CAHA extended the deadline to November 1 for seniors and until January 6 for students attending school. The CAHA also approved in principle to have contracts which tied amateurs to teams, and had the potential to demand a release payment for a players to be signed by a professional team. Dowell felt that amateurs players would be unwilling to sign a contract, and sought for more details to be sent to CAHA branches for discussion.

== CAHA vice-president ==
The Allan Cup trophy

=== Second vice-president ===
Dowell was elected second vice-president of the CAHA in April 1940, and became the first person from the Maritimes to serve on the CAHA executive. The CAHA and the Amateur Hockey Association of the United States (AHAUS) agreed to form a new governing body known as the International Ice Hockey Association, and invited the British Ice Hockey Association to join. CAHA president W. G. Hardy stated the new body was to promote and to govern international hockey since the Ligue Internationale de Hockey sur Glace (LIHG) had become inactive during World War II. A constitution for the new association was delegated to a committee including Dowell and future CAHA president W. B. George.

The CAHA executive agreed to contribute C$10,000 to the Government of Canada and the war effort in June 1940. The CAHA expected to operate as usual for the upcoming season and was willing to assist military teams to be part of the schedule.

Dowell applied for CAHA approval of players to be imported by the Cape Breton Senior Hockey League for the 1940–41 season, which included war time exemptions for students and employment transfers. Dowell suspended several ineligible players when the league failed to complete the proper transfer requirements. The Glace Bay Miners lost their goaltender, and local coal miners threatened to strike in protest. Despite the local uproar, Dowell changed the playoffs format into a best-of-three series which was subsequently defaulted in favour of the Sydney Millionaires.

During the 1941 Memorial Cup playoffs in Eastern Canada, Dowell discontinued the series between the Ottawa Canadiens and the Charlottetown Royals after playing only game. Ottawa won by a 12–3 score and Dowell stated, it was "quite evident" which team would win the series.

Dowell was re-elected in April 1941. The CAHA approved a rule change to allow for the replacement of an injured or ill goaltender in the playoffs, and approved in principle to sanction any player who signed with more than one club. The CAHA continued plans to operate hockey during the war with assurance that it was supported by the government to maintain the morale of the Canada people.

=== First vice-president ===
Dowell was elected first vice-president of the CAHA in April 1942. The CAHA approved grants to increase participation in minor ice hockey, and to compensate senior and junior ice hockey teams in Western Canada for their higher travel costs compared to teams in Ontario and Quebec. The CAHA and the National Hockey League (NHL) agreed in principle that junior-aged players would be permitted to turn professional at any time during the 1942–43 NHL season due to the need to make a living and the shortage of players during the war.

Dowell was re-elected in April 1943. The CAHA increased grants to promote minor ice hockey, donated an additional $5,000 to the war effort, purchased $10,000 in Victory bonds, and supported plans by the International Ice Hockey Association to take control of post-war international ice hockey events on behalf of Canada. Dowell was named to CAHA committees which planned to implement ice hockey rules more similar to the NHL, and to discuss development payments from the NHL for amateur players signed by professional clubs. He was also named a trustee of the Colonel J. Burke Trophy, awarded for the Eastern Canada intermediate ice hockey championship.

Dowell was re-elected in April 1944. The CAHA set the minimum age limit to become professional at 16, and amended rules for Allan Cup and Memorial Cup playoffs to set a fixed deadline for submission of a roster which was to include two goaltenders and a limited number of replacements due to military service.

== CAHA president ==
The Memorial Cup trophy

=== First term ===
Dowell was elected president of the CAHA on April 17, 1945, to succeed Frank Sargent, and became the first person from the Maritimes or Atlantic Canada to be elected president. The CAHA expanded its practice of covering travel expenses for junior teams in the Memorial Cup playoffs to include the inter-provincial stages in addition to the national finals. The CAHA also enlarged its rules committee to give representation to all branches in Canada.

Dowell declared that any player discharged from a military team was now free agent and could play where he resided without a transfer being required. The CAHA resumed Allan Cup competition after a hiatus in 1945, and scheduled the 1946 Allan Cup finals in Vancouver to coincide with the next general meeting. Dowell and the International Ice Hockey Association went ahead with plans for international competitions between leagues and how to classify each team. Pacific Coast Hockey League secretary Al Leader subsequently declared intent to have playoffs between the amateur senior hockey champions of Canada and the United States.

Dowell expected increased demand for Canadian-born players by leagues based in England, Scotland and the United States. He anticipated that the focus of the upcoming general meeting in 1946 would discuss methods for the CAHA to regulate the international transfer of players and prevent rosters in Canada from being depleted.

=== Second term ===
Dowell was re-elected as president on May 5, 1946. The CAHA and the NHL discussed renewing their professional-amateur agreement, and the NHL offered a flat rate of $20,000 to cover development costs for all amateurs who turned professional. The CAHA sought a more lucrative financial arrangement, but was at a disadvantage due to competition from professional leagues in Europe, and that it wanted to main good relations with the NHL which had paid for players it signed then lost to the war. After a meeting in June 1946, the CAHA agreed to the flat offer, and the NHL agreed that it could sign an amateur to a contract at age 16 but the player would remain in junior hockey until age 18, before playing in the NHL or one of its minor leagues. In December 1946, Dowell and NHL president Clarence Campbell signed a one-year agreement which clarified suspensions and the reinstatement process with respect to the corresponding payments for signing amateurs. Later in December, the new professional-amateur agreement was tested by the signing of two amateurs by the Buffalo Bisons of the American Hockey League. The Ottawa Senators of the Quebec Senior Hockey League sought a court injunction to prevent the signing two players mid-season. Dowell said that the signings were allowed under the existing agreement, since the players were at least age 18 by the January 15 deadline.

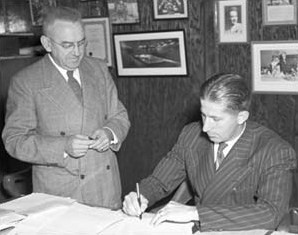
Frank J. Selke (left) watching Elmer Lach sign a contract

Montreal Canadiens general manager Frank J. Selke proposed a farm system in which professional teams would sponsor junior ice hockey teams in Canada. The plan would keep professional prospects at the junior level to allow them to develop home-grown talent, and prevent professional from relocating the players from Western Canada to the more dominant teams in Ontario. Selke felt that junior-aged players would develop better with the talent being dispersed, rather than concentrated on a small number of all-star teams. Dowell felt that most of Selke's points had merit and generally approved of the concept, since leaving players in junior hockey until age 20 would be better overall across Canada.

Dowell attended the 1946 LIHG congress and sought to standardize playing rules for international ice hockey. The LIHG agreed to changes which included three twenty-minute periods and a limit of 12 players per team. The Ice Hockey World Championships were scheduled to resume in 1947 after being on hiatus during the war. The first four teams which the CAHA nominated to be the Canada men's national ice hockey team, all declined to represent Canada for financial reasons. Dowell then announced the Edmonton Junior Canadians were to attend the 1947 Ice Hockey World Championships, pending an exhibition tour in Europe to cover the team's travel expenses. After the proposed tour would be insufficient to cover travel costs, Edmonton declined the offer as they were unable to make their own financial arrangements. No other team was nominated and Canada did not participate at the World Championships in 1947.

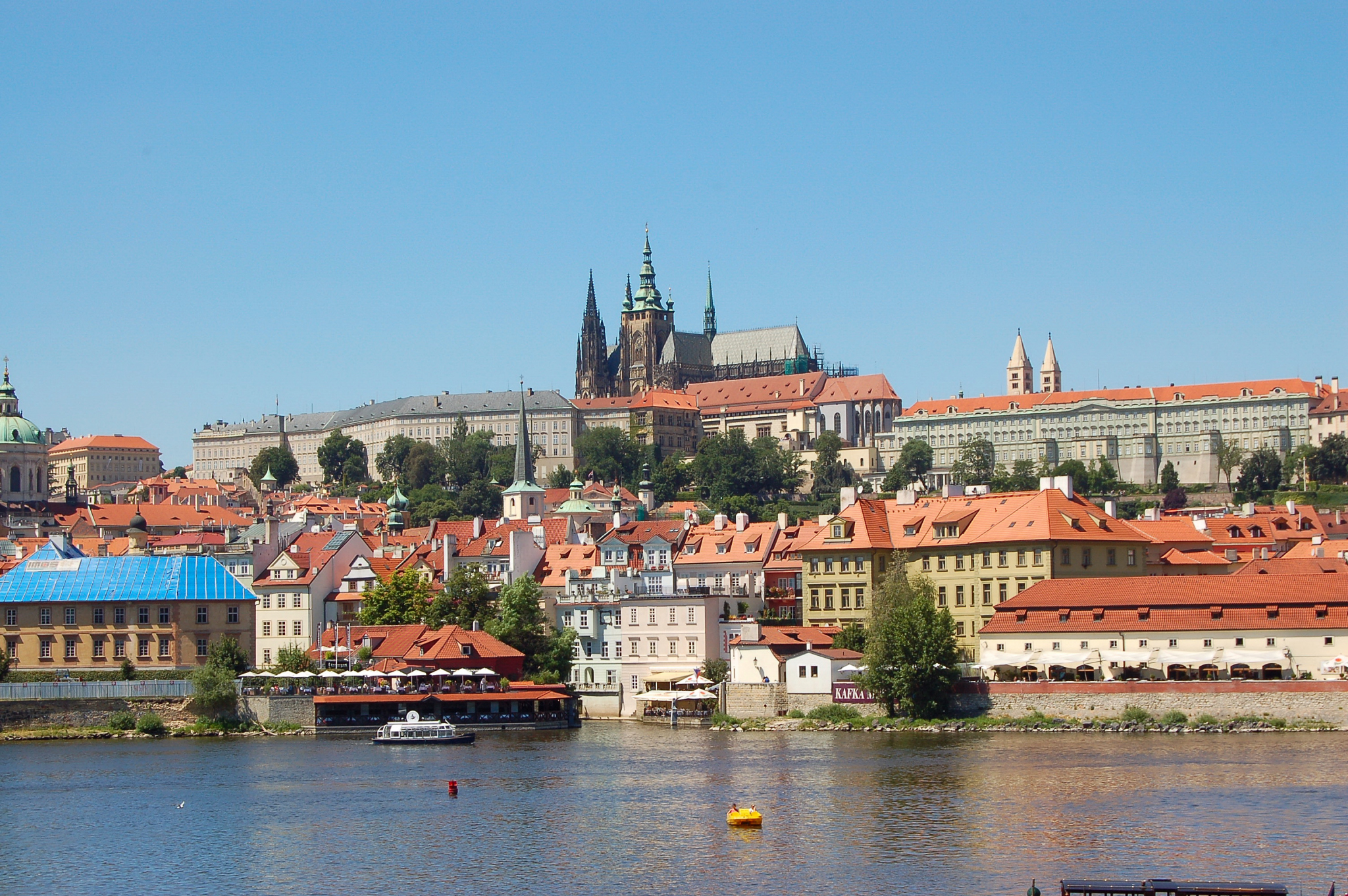
Prague hosted both the Ice Hockey World Championships and the LIHG congress in 1947.

Dowell planned to attend the 1947 LIHG congress and propose that the LIHG merge with the International Ice Hockey Association, providing that three demands by the CAHA were accepted:

1. Recognition of the CAHA definition of an amateur; an athlete not actively engaged in professional sport
2. System of membership and voting within the new body acceptable to the CAHA
3. For the Amateur Hockey Association of the United States to be accepted as a member in the new body

The CAHA also sought to have W. G. Hardy nominated as the vice-president of the new body, and George Dudley as its secretary. Dowell sailed to Europe aboard the RMS Queen Elizabeth along with Cecil Duncan, who had previously been a vice-president of the LIHG. They expected a lengthy debate over whether the AHAUS would be recognized as the hockey authority in the United States as opposed to the Amateur Athletic Union which was the existing LIHG member. Dowell and Duncan allied with Walter A. Brown and Bunny Ahearne to pass a motion in which the LIHG voted to ban any member organization which controlled more than one sport, which expelled the AAU and accepted the AHAUS instead.

The LIHG permitted the CAHA to have its own definition of amateur in Canada, but international matches would still be governed by the definition of pure amateurism accepted by the LIHG and the International Olympic Committee (IOC). The decision meant that Canadian teams on exhibition tours in Europe did not have to be fully amateur, but the national team at the World Championship and the Winter Olympics had to be pure amateurs. The deferred any decision on changing voting powers. After the meeting, Dowell stated he was satisfied with the decisions although they may not be widely accepted in Canada.

Upon Dowell's return from Europe, he stated that Canada had greater likelihood of participating in ice hockey at the 1948 Winter Olympics, and the recognition of AHAUS as a LIHG member would regulate movement of players internationally and prevent rosters of Canadian teams from being depleted. Hardy agreed to dissolve the International Ice Hockey Association and accepted the vice-presidency of the LIHG, with the promise that the LIHG presidency be held by North America every three years. Dowell also announced plans for the Sweden men's national ice hockey team to play an exhibition tour Canada in advance of the 1948 Winter Olympics.

The CAHA scheduled the 1947 Memorial Cup finals to be played in Western Canada, although the Maple Leaf Gardens in Toronto had hosted the finals from 1943 to 1946 to maximize profits during the war. Dowell declared that the 1947 finals to be profitable, and showed that spectators in Western Canada would support the national championship. Dowell was succeeded by Al Pickard as president at the 1947 general meeting.

== Later hockey career and politics ==
Dowell was the past-president of the CAHA from 1947 to 1950. He remained active in attending the annual general meetings, and oversaw the senior hockey playoffs in Eastern Canada on behalf of the CAHA. He served as president of the Central Valley Hockey League during the 1952–53 season, and was appointed by the CAHA to arbitrate a player eligibility dispute in the Maritime Men's Hockey League which threatened to withdraw from the MAHA in April 1953. Dowell returned to the MAHA executive in 1956, when he was elected secretary-treasurer of the association.

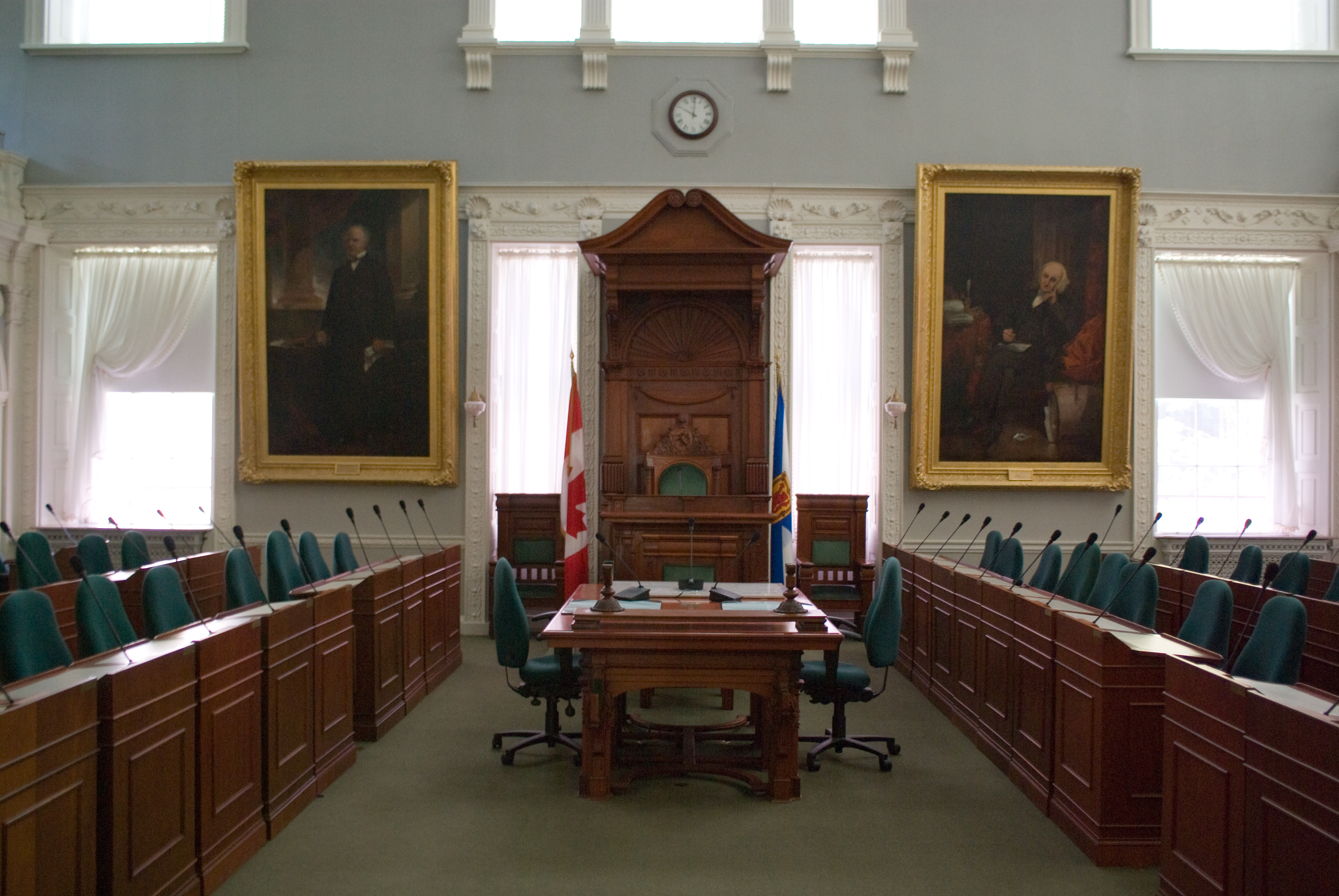
The Nova Scotia House of Assembly legislative chamber at Province House in Halifax

Dowell was a Conservative Party candidate in the 1960 Nova Scotia general election for the newly established district of Annapolis East. He was elected to the 47th General Assembly of Nova Scotia by defeating Henry Hicks, the Leader of the Opposition and the Liberal Party candidate. After a recount was completed, Dowell's victory was reduced from a fourteen-vote margin to eight votes. Dowell took his seat in a majority government led by Robert Stanfield, and was speculated by the Canadian Press as a candidate for a cabinet position due to his background as a lawyer and as a prominent hockey executive.

Dowell resigned his seat for Annapolis East in February 1962, when he was appointed a stipendiary magistrate for Middleton and Annapolis County. He was subsequently appointed a judge for the county court of Nova Scotia third district in 1963, a judge for the Nova Scotia divorce court in 1966, and a judge for the trial division of the Nova Scotia Supreme Court in 1968. He also served as a registrar for the Annapolis County probate court, was one of the founding members of the Western Counties Bar Association, and retired from his judicial career in 1981.

Dowell continued as the secretary-treasurer of the MAHA until 1968, when the New Brunswick Amateur Hockey Association separated and became its own CAHA branch. He remained as treasurer of the MAHA until 1974, when it was dissolved and replaced by the Nova Scotia Hockey Association (NSHA) and the Prince Edward Island Hockey Association. He served as treasurer of the NSHA until retiring in 1986.

== Personal life ==
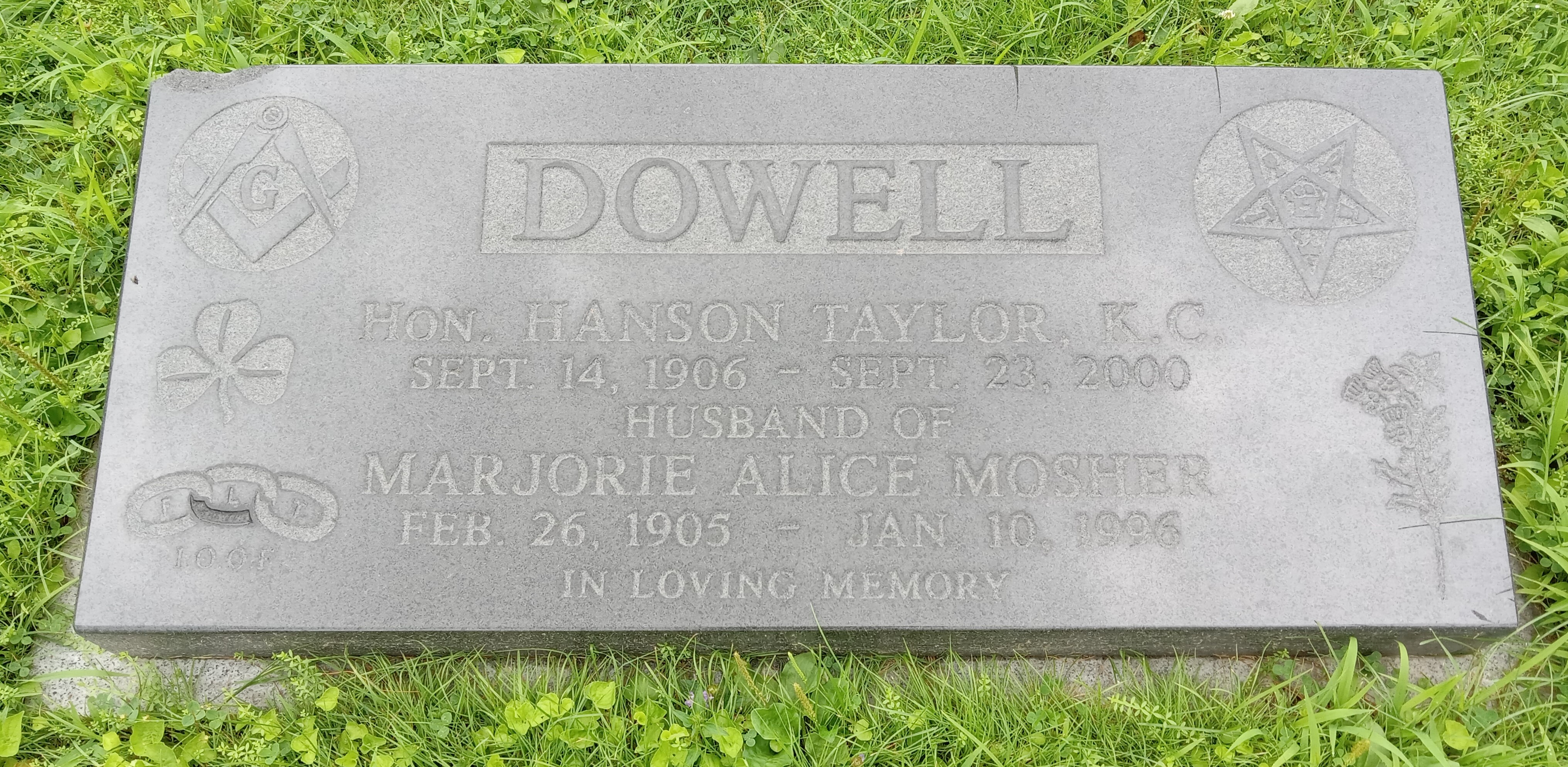
Dowell's grave marker

Dowell was married to Marjorie Alice Mosher, with whom he had three sons and two daughters. During World War II he served in the 2nd Battalion of the West Nova Scotia Regiment.

Dowell served as a member of the Middleton Fire Department for 15 years, and was partner in sponsoring the Middleton Cardinals which competed in the Halifax and District Baseball League. He was involved in community service for 65 years as both a member of Sunbeam Lodge #64 in the Independent Order of Odd Fellows, and as a Freemason in Ionic Lodge #73 where he served a term as the Lodge Master. He was a member of the Middleton Tennis Club, and served on the executive of the Middleton Curling Club.

Dowell died at home in Middleton on September 23, 2000, and was interred in the Elmsdale Cemetery.

== Honours and awards ==
Dowell received the AHAUS citation award in 1950, for contributions to developing ice hockey in the United States. He was among the first recipients of the Order of Merit established by the CAHA in 1962, for contributions to the game in Canada, and was made a life member of the CAHA in May 1973.

Dowell was named a Queen's Counsel in recognition of his legal career in Nova Scotia. He was a life member of the Middleton Curling Club, and was inducted into the builder category of Nova Scotia Sport Hall of Fame in 1980, and the Middleton Sport Heritage Wall of Fame in 1998. He was posthumously inducted into the Truro Sports Hall of Fame in 2006.

== Bibliography ==
- Ferguson, Bob (2005). Who's Who in Canadian Sport, Volume 4. Markham, Ontario: Fitzhenry & Whiteside. ISBN 1-55041-855-6.
- Constitution, By-laws, Regulations, History. Gloucester, Ontario: Canadian Amateur Hockey Association. May 1990.
- Lapp, Richard M.; Macaulay, Alec (1997). The Memorial Cup: Canada's National Junior Hockey Championship. Madeira Park, British Columbia: Harbour Publishing. ISBN 1-55017-170-4.
