= Merryl Lawton =

Canadian politician

MLA for Digby
- In office 1984–1988
- Preceded by: Joe Casey
- Succeeded by: Joe Casey

Personal details
- Born: 1949 (age 76–77)
- Party: Progressive Conservative

Merryl Lawton is a Canadian politician. He represented the electoral district of Digby in the Nova Scotia House of Assembly from 1984 to 1988. He was a member of the Progressive Conservative Party of Nova Scotia.

Lawton entered provincial politics in the 1984 election, winning the Digby riding by almost 1,800 votes. He did not seek re-election in 1988.
