= Allan Ellsworth Wall =

Canadian politician from Nova Scotia (1862-1918

Member of the Nova Scotia House of Assembly for Digby County
- In office November 16, 1910 – September 21, 1911

Personal details
- Born: 1862 Saint John, New Brunswick
- Died: 1918 (aged 55–56) Amherst, Nova Scotia
- Party: Liberal
- Occupation: public official, politician

Allan Ellsworth Wall (1862 – June 19, 1918) was a public official and political figure in Nova Scotia, Canada. He represented Digby County in the Nova Scotia House of Assembly in 1911 as a Liberal member. He resigned before the House met to contest the 1911 Canadian federal election for Digby as a Liberal. Wall died in 1918 in Amherst, Nova Scotia. He was elected in a 1910 by-election, and the 1911 Nova Scotia general election, but was unsuccessful in the subsequent November 1911 by-election.
