= 1960 Nova Scotia general election =

Canadian provincial election

- June 7, 1960

43 seats of the Nova Scotia House of Assembly 22 seats needed for a majority
- Turnout: 82.02% ▲2.19pp
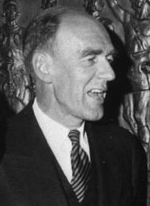
	First party	Second party	Third party
		Lib	CCF
Leader	Robert Stanfield	Henry Hicks	Michael James MacDonald
Party	Progressive Conservative	Liberal	Co-operative Commonwealth
Leader since	November 10, 1948	September 9, 1954	1953
Leader's seat	Colchester	Annapolis East (Lost re-election)	Cape Breton Centre
Last election	24	18	1
Seats won	27	15	1
Seat change	▲3	▼3	Steady
Popular vote	168,023	147,951	31,036
Percentage	48.11%	42.36%	8.89%
Swing	▼0.44pp	▼5.29pp	▲5.94pp
Premier before election
Robert Stanfield
Progressive Conservative
Premier after election
Robert Stanfield
Progressive Conservative

The 1960 Nova Scotia general election was held on 7 June 1960 to elect members of the 47th House of Assembly of the province of Nova Scotia, Canada. It was won by the Progressive Conservatives.

== Results ==
=== Results by party ===
↓
27	15	1
Progressive Conservative	Liberal	CCF

Official results
Party	Party leader	# of candidates	Seats				Popular vote		
Party	Party leader	# of candidates	1956	Dissolution	Elected	Change	#	%	Change (pp)
Progressive Conservative	Robert Stanfield	43	24	24	27	+3	168,023	48.11%	-0.44%
Liberal	Henry Hicks	43	18	17	15	-3	147,951	42.36%	-5.29%
Co-operative Commonwealth	Michael James MacDonald	34	1	1	1	0	31,036	8.89%	+5.94%
Independent		1	0	0	0	0	650	0.19%	-0.05%
Vacant				1					
Total valid votes							347,660	99.54%	+0.15%
Blank and invalid ballots							1,596	0.46%	-0.15%
Total		121	43	43	43	–	349,256	100.00%	–
Registered voters / turnout							388,805	82.02%	+2.19%

Popular vote
PC	48.11%
Liberal	42.36%
CCF	8.89%
Independent	0.19%

Seats summary
PC	62.79%
Liberal	34.88%
CCF	2.33%

== Retiring incumbents ==
Liberal

- Geoffrey W. Stevens, Halifax County Dartmouth

Progressive Conservative

- Malcolm Stewart Leonard, Digby
- John Michael Macdonald, Cape Breton North
- Hiram Thomas, Kings West

== Nominated candidates ==
Legend
bold denotes party leader
† denotes an incumbent who is not running for re-election or was defeated in nomination contest

=== Valley ===
Electoral district	Candidates				Incumbent
Electoral district	PC	Liberal	CCF	Independent	Incumbent
Annapolis East	Hanson Dowell; 2,666; 48.69%	**Henry Hicks**; 2,658; 48.55%	Murray Alton Bent; 151; 2.76%		Henry Hicks
Annapolis West	Charles T. LeBrun; 2,068; 42.74%	Peter M. Nicholson; 2,571; 53.14%	Louis A. Beeler; 199; 4.11%		Peter M. Nicholson
Clare	Kenneth Weaver; 2,034; 47.87%	Pierre E. Belliveau; 2,215; 52.13%			Pierre E. Belliveau
Digby	E. Keith Potter; 2,593; 48.15%	Victor Cardoza; 2,651; 49.23%	Foster Journeay; 141; 2.62%		Malcolm Stewart Leonard†
Hants West	George Henry Wilson; 3,623; 49.27%	Gerald Regan; 3,412; 46.40%	Howard B. Wile; 319; 4.34%		George Henry Wilson
Kings North	Gladys Porter; 3,060; 51.19%	Eric Balcom; 2,782; 46.54%	Levitte Joseph Melanson; 136; 2.28%		Eric Balcom
Kings South	Edward Haliburton; 2,388; 57.29%	Bruce Trenholm; 1,581; 37.93%	George R. Goucher; 199; 4.77%		Edward Haliburton
Kings West	R.F. Hazel; 3,425; 45.18%	Edward D. MacArthur; 3,937; 51.93%	George Turner; 219; 2.89%		Hiram Thomas†

=== South Shore ===
Electoral district	Candidates				Incumbent
Electoral district	PC	Liberal	CCF	Independent	Incumbent
Lunenburg Centre	George O. Lohnes; 4,384; 52.25%	Nathan Simeon Joudrey; 3,832; 45.67%	Arthur William Benedict; 175; 2.09%		George O. Lohnes
Lunenburg East	Maurice L. Zinck; 2,140; 58.37%	Kirk S. Hennigar; 1,405; 38.33%	Albro Boehner; 121; 3.30%		Maurice L. Zinck
Lunenburg West	Harley J. Spence; 2,858; 52.94%	Frederick E.L. Fowke; 2,541; 47.06%			Harley J. Spence
Queens	W. S. Kennedy Jones; 3,770; 59.04%	Della P. Richardson; 2,616; 40.96%			W. S. Kennedy Jones
Shelburne	James McKay Harding; 3,539; 52.94%	William Russell MacKay; 3,146; 47.06%			James McKay Harding
Yarmouth	George A. Burridge; 4,811; 24.82%	Eric Spinney; 4,309; 22.23%		Willard Franklyn Allen; 650; 3.35%	Eric Spinney
Yarmouth	George A. Snow; 4,578; 23.62%	Willard O'Brien; 5,037; 25.98%			Willard O'Brien

=== Fundy-Northeast ===
Electoral district	Candidates				Incumbent
Electoral district	PC	Liberal	CCF	Independent	Incumbent
Colchester	**Robert Stanfield**; 8,574; 28.82%	Hugh Charles MacKinnon; 5,439; 18.28%	Harvey T. Curtis; 704; 2.37%		Robert Stanfield
Colchester	George Isaac Smith; 8,219; 27.62%	Gordon Purdy; 6,127; 20.59%	Helen K. Wright; 692; 2.33%		George Isaac Smith
Cumberland Centre	Stephen T. Pyke; 2,308; 52.91%	Ralph F. Gilroy; 1,753; 40.19%	John R. Tabor; 301; 6.90%		Stephen T. Pyke
Cumberland East	James A. Langille; 5,081; 57.08%	Walter T. Purdy; 3,471; 39.00%	Lloyd L. Ayer; 349; 3.92%		James A. Langille
Cumberland West	George Percy Graham; 2,219; 45.79%	Allison T. Smith; 2,418; 49.90%	Thomas Alton Johnstone; 209; 4.31%		Allison T. Smith
Hants East	Ernest M. Ettinger; 2,426; 49.50%	Carl Spencer Grant; 2,207; 45.03%	Alfred James Scothorn; 268; 5.47%		Ernest M. Ettinger

=== Halifax/Dartmouth/Eastern Shore ===
Electoral district	Candidates				Incumbent
Electoral district	PC	Liberal	CCF	Independent	Incumbent
Halifax Centre	Donald MacKeen Smith; 4,921; 48.01%	Gordon S. Cowan; 4,651; 45.38%	James M. Murray; 678; 6.61%		Gordon S. Cowan
Halifax County-Dartmouth	Murray Ritcey; 7,653; 43.05%	Gordon L. S. Hart; 8,258; 46.46%	Percy W. Dares; 1,864; 10.49%		Geoffrey W. Stevens†
Halifax East	Nelson Gaetz; 2,432; 44.06%	Duncan MacMillan; 2,787; 50.49%	Wallace H. Mason; 301; 5.45%		Duncan MacMillan
Halifax North	Robert Mullane; 7,444; 44.09%	John E. Ahern; 7,974; 47.23%	Charles A. Moulton; 1,466; 8.68%		John E. Ahern
Halifax Northwest	Gordon H. Fitzgerald; 4,209; 46.55%	Ronald Manning Fielding; 4,182; 46.26%	L.C. Wilson; 650; 7.19%		Ronald Manning Fielding
Halifax South	Richard Donahoe; 5,861; 54.65%	Robert James Butler; 4,302; 40.12%	Ralph Loomer; 561; 5.23%		Richard Donahoe
Halifax West	D. C. McNeil; 6,684; 45.06%	Charles H. Reardon; 6,925; 46.68%	Harold J. Martell; 1,225; 8.26%		Charles H. Reardon

=== Central Nova ===
Electoral district	Candidates				Incumbent
Electoral district	PC	Liberal	CCF	Independent	Incumbent
Antigonish	William F. MacKinnon; 3,177; 54.77%	Vincent J. MacDonald; 2,495; 43.01%	Alex MacPherson; 129; 2.22%		William F. MacKinnon
Guysborough	Alexander MacIsaac; 3,123; 49.98%	Norman Robert Anderson; 2,934; 46.95%	Leslie Wilfred Myers; 192; 3.07%		Vacant
Pictou Centre	Donald R. MacLeod; 4,755; 43.92%	James H. Power; 3,615; 33.39%	Doris Nicholson; 2,456; 22.69%		Donald R. MacLeod
Pictou East	William A. MacLeod; 2,424; 44.55%	John W. MacDonald; 2,568; 47.20%	Barrie M. Hould; 449; 8.25%		William A. MacLeod
Pictou West	Harvey Veniot; 2,744; 52.28%	W.A. Broidy; 2,353; 44.83%	W.E. Salsman; 152; 2.90%		Harvey Veniot

=== Cape Breton ===
Electoral district	Candidates				Incumbent
Electoral district	PC	Liberal	CCF	Independent	Incumbent
Cape Breton Centre	Lowell Murray; 1,964; 27.19%	James P. McNeil; 1,887; 26.13%	**Michael James MacDonald**; 3,371; 46.68%		Michael James MacDonald
Cape Breton East	Layton Fergusson; 4,862; 45.56%	Joe A. Wadden; 1,567; 14.68%	John L. MacKinnon; 4,243; 39.76%		Layton Fergusson
Cape Breton North	Tom MacKeough; 5,257; 46.83%	Ted Sullivan; 3,094; 27.56%	Thomas R. MacDonald; 2,875; 25.61%		John Michael Macdonald†
Cape Breton Nova	Percy Gaum; 2,525; 36.93%	Wilfred Gillis; 2,094; 30.63%	Albert Ollie Wilson; 2,218; 32.44%		Percy Gaum
Cape Breton South	Donald C. MacNeil; 5,153; 46.23%	Ritchie MacCoy; 3,718; 33.36%	Bernard O'Neil; 2,275; 20.41%		Donald C. MacNeil
Cape Breton West	Edward Manson; 4,192; 45.37%	Herbert Shannon; 3,652; 39.53%	John R. Lynk; 1,395; 15.10%		Edward Manson
Inverness	Archie Neil Chisholm; 3,923; 24.43%	Joseph Clyde Nunn; 4,113; 25.62%	Stephen James MacLellan; 353; 2.20%		Joseph Clyde Nunn
Inverness	Ralph Mauger MacKichan; 3,648; 22.72%	Roderick MacLean; 4,018; 25.03%			Roderick MacLean
Richmond	Byron Seymour Langley; 2,491; 48.89%	Earl Wallace Urquhart; 2,604; 51.11%			Earl Wallace Urquhart
Victoria	Leonard Walter Jones; 1,817; 46.96%	Carleton L. MacMillan; 2,052; 53.04%			Carleton L. MacMillan
