= Albert James Smith Copp =

Canadian politician

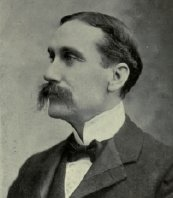

Member of the Canada Parliament for Digby
- In office 1896–1908
- Preceded by: Edward Charles Bowers
- Succeeded by: Clarence Jameson

Personal details
- Born: December 19, 1866 Amherst, Nova Scotia
- Died: October 8, 1912 (aged 45)
- Party: Liberal

Albert James Smith Copp (December 19, 1866 –October 8, 1912) was a Canadian politician.

Born in Amherst, Nova Scotia, the son of Thomas Copp, Copp was educated in Amherst Academy, Dorchester and Sackville, New Brunswick. He was called to the Bar of Nova Scotia in 1879. Copp practised law in Digby. He was a crown prosecutor for the County of Digby from 1887 to 1910. He served as Commercial Agent for Canada in Boston in 1910. He was first elected to the House of Commons of Canada for the electoral district of Digby in the general elections of 1896. A Liberal, he was re-elected in 1900 and 1904. He was defeated in 1908.

In 1881, he married Eliza Dennison.

1900 Canadian federal election: Digby
Party	Candidate	Votes
Liberal	Albert James Smith Copp	1,923
Conservative	J. Edgar Jones	1,418

1904 Canadian federal election: Digby
Party	Candidate	Votes
Liberal	Albert James Smith Copp	1,840
Conservative	John Arthur Grinson	1,096
Independent Liberal	C. Comeau	105

1908 Canadian federal election: Digby
Party	Candidate	Votes
Conservative	Clarence Jameson	1,771
Liberal	Albert James Smith Copp	1,640
