= John I. Marshall =

Canadian politician

MLA for Annapolis East
- In office 1963–1970
- Preceded by: Hanson Dowell
- Succeeded by: Gerry Sheehy

Personal details
- Born: April 10, 1899 Middleton, Nova Scotia
- Died: September 9, 1976 (aged 77) Middleton, Nova Scotia
- Party: Progressive Conservative
- Occupation: telephone official

John Inglis Marshall (April 10, 1899 – September 9, 1976) was a Canadian politician. He represented the electoral district of Annapolis East in the Nova Scotia House of Assembly from 1963 to 1970, as a member of the Progressive Conservative Party of Nova Scotia.

== Early life and education ==
Born in 1899 at Middleton, Nova Scotia, Marshall was educated at Maritime Business College. He married Annie Ethel Isabel Jensen in 1927.

== Career ==
He was employed with the Maritime Telegraph and Telephone Company for 42 years.

== Political career ==
Marshall served as a town councillor in Middleton. He entered provincial politics in the 1963 election, winning the Annapolis East riding by 730 votes. He was re-elected in the 1967 election, but did not re-offer in the 1970 election.

== Death ==
Marshall died at Middleton on September 9, 1976.
