= Urbine Doucett =

Canadian politician from Nova Scotia

Member of the Nova Scotia House of Assembly for Digby County
- In office September 18, 1867 – December 16, 1874

Personal details
- Party: Anti-Confederate, Liberal
- Occupation: shipowner, shipbuilder, politician

Urbine Doucett (unknown – unknown) was a shipowner, shipbuilder, and political figure in Nova Scotia, Canada. He represented Digby County in the Nova Scotia House of Assembly from 1867 to 1874 as an Anti-Confederate and Liberal member. He was elected in the 1867 and the 1871 Nova Scotia general elections.
