= Alfred William Savary =

Canadian politician (1831–1920)

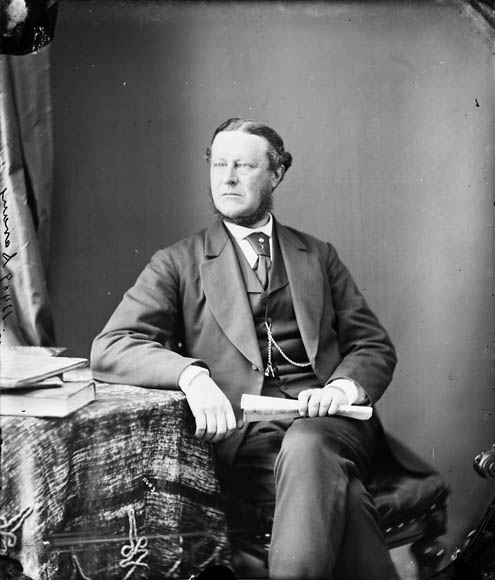

Member of the Canadian Parliament for Digby
- In office 1867–1874
- Succeeded by: Edwin Randolph Oakes

Personal details
- Born: 10 October 1831 Plympton, Nova Scotia
- Died: 30 March 1920 (aged 88) Annapolis Royal, Nova Scotia
- Party: Anti-Confederate (1867-1869); Conservative
- Spouse(s): Bessie Cruickshanks (d. 1887); Hunt (m. 1892)

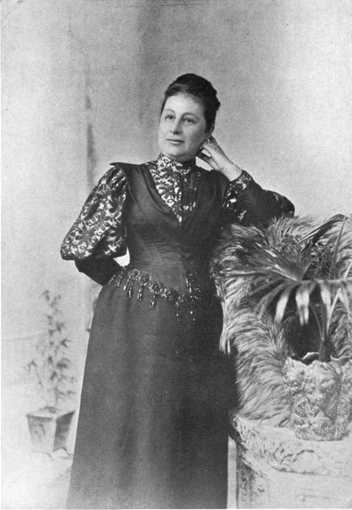
Eliza Theresa Hunt Savary

Alfred William Savary, QC (10 October 1831 – 30 March 1920) served as a Nova Scotia member of the 1st Canadian Parliament for the Digby riding.

Savary was born in Plympton, Nova Scotia, the son of Sabine Savary and Olivia Marshall, and was educated at King's College in Windsor, Nova Scotia. He was called to the New Brunswick bar in 1857 and to the Nova Scotia bar in July 1861. Savary practised law in Digby, Nova Scotia. He was also editor of the New Brunswicker. In 1872, he was named Queen's Counsel. Savary was married twice: to Bessie Crookshank Otty in 1877 and to Eliza Theresa Hunt in 1892.

Savary ran unsuccessfully for the Digby seat in the Nova Scotia assembly in 1863.

He was elected under the Anti-Confederation Party banner to the new Canadian Parliament in 1867, but became a Conservative in 1869. He won re-election to the 2nd Canadian Parliament in 1872, but was defeated in the following election in 1874.

Savary was the author of:

- A genealogical and biographical record of the Savery families (Savory and Savary) and of the Severy family (Severit, Savery, Savory and Savary) ... published in 1893
- History of the county of Annapolis: including old Port Royal and Acadia ..., published in 1897

He served as county court judge for the 3rd District in Nova Scotia from 1876 to 1907.

Savary died at his home in Annapolis Royal, Nova Scotia approximately 02:40 on 30 March 1920 after losing consciousness several days earlier. He was among the final surviving members of the first modern Canadian parliament as only Albert Hagar outlived Savary.

== Electoral record ==
1867 Canadian federal election: Digby
Party	Candidate	Votes
Anti-Confederation	Alfred William Savary	792
Liberal–Conservative	John Chipman Wade	497
Unknown	William Mehan	362

1872 Canadian federal election: Digby
Party	Candidate	Votes
Conservative	Alfred William Savary	acclaimed
Source: Canadian Elections Database

1874 Canadian federal election: Digby
Party	Candidate	Votes
Liberal–Conservative	E. Oakes	1,168
Conservative	Alfred Savary	631
Source: Canadian Elections Database
