= Joseph H. Casey =

Canadian politician

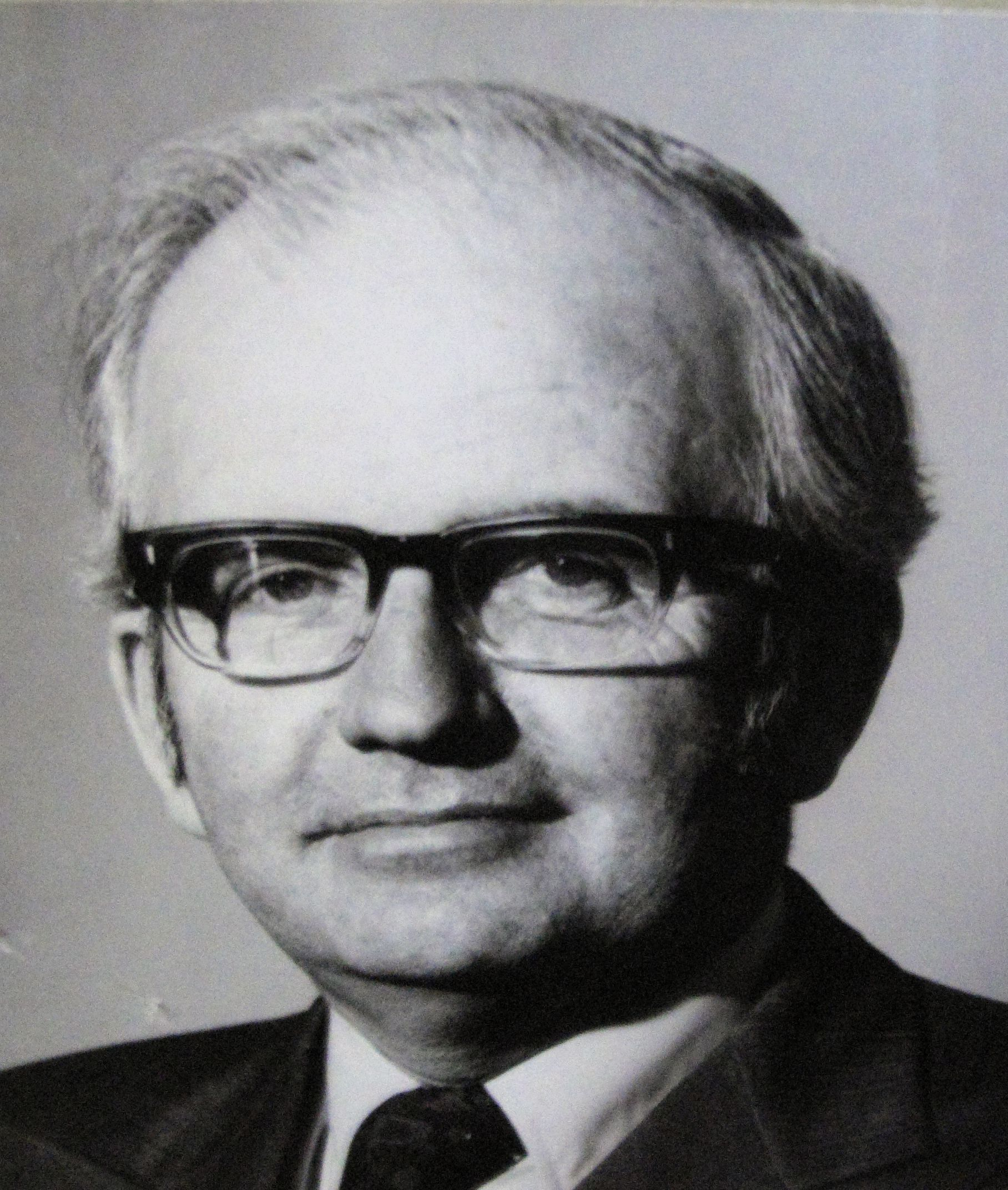
- Casey, c. 1973

Member of Nova Scotia House of Assembly
- In office October 13, 1970 – November 6, 1984
- Preceded by: Robert Baden Powell
- Succeeded by: Merryl Lawton
- Constituency: Digby
- In office September 6, 1988 – 1997
- Preceded by: Merryl Lawton
- Succeeded by: Gordon Balser
- Constituency: Digby-Annapolis

Personal details
- Born: Joseph Henry Casey; May 3, 1918 Victoria Beach, Nova Scotia
- Died: February 16, 2010 (aged 91) Victoria Beach, Nova Scotia
- Party: Liberal
- Spouse: Vera Gertrude McWhinnie
- Occupation: Fish plant operator, steamship pilot, politician

Joseph Henry Casey (May 3, 1918 – February 16, 2010) was a fish plant operator, steamship pilot and political figure in Nova Scotia, Canada. He represented Digby and then Digby-Annapolis in the Nova Scotia House of Assembly from 1970 to 1984 and from 1988 to 1997 as a Liberal member.

== Early life ==
He was born in Victoria Beach, Nova Scotia, the son of John William Casey and Laura Holmes. In 1942, Casey married Vera Gertrude McWhinnie. During World War II, he served in the Canadian Army from 1941 to 1942 and in the Royal Canadian Navy from 1942 to 1946.

== Political career ==
Casey did not run for reelection in 1984.

Casey published two autobiographical works:

- The Wit and Wisdom of Joe Casey (1995) ISBN 0-88999-562-1
- The Life and Times of Joe Casey: From Fish to Politics (2008) ISBN 1-897426-02-X

The ferry MV Joe Casey, named in his honour, operates on the Bay of Fundy between East Ferry and Tiverton in Digby County.

== Death ==
Casey died on February 16, 2010.
