= Angus Morrison Gidney (politician) =

Canadian politician

Angus Morrison Gidney (November 7, 1849 – June 28, 1926) was a farmer and political figure in Nova Scotia, Canada. He represented Digby County in the Nova Scotia House of Assembly as a Liberal-Conservative member from 1895 to 1911.

He was born in Mink Cove, Digby County, Nova Scotia and was educated there. Gidney married Annie Crosby in 1886. He served on the municipal council for Digby from 1884 to 1892. He was elected to the provincial assembly in an 1895 by-election held after the death of Eliakim Tupper. Gidney was customs collector for the port of Digby from 1910 to 1922. He died at Centreville in Digby County at the age of 76.
