= Barton, Nova Scotia =

Community in Nova Scotia, Canada

Barton
- Community
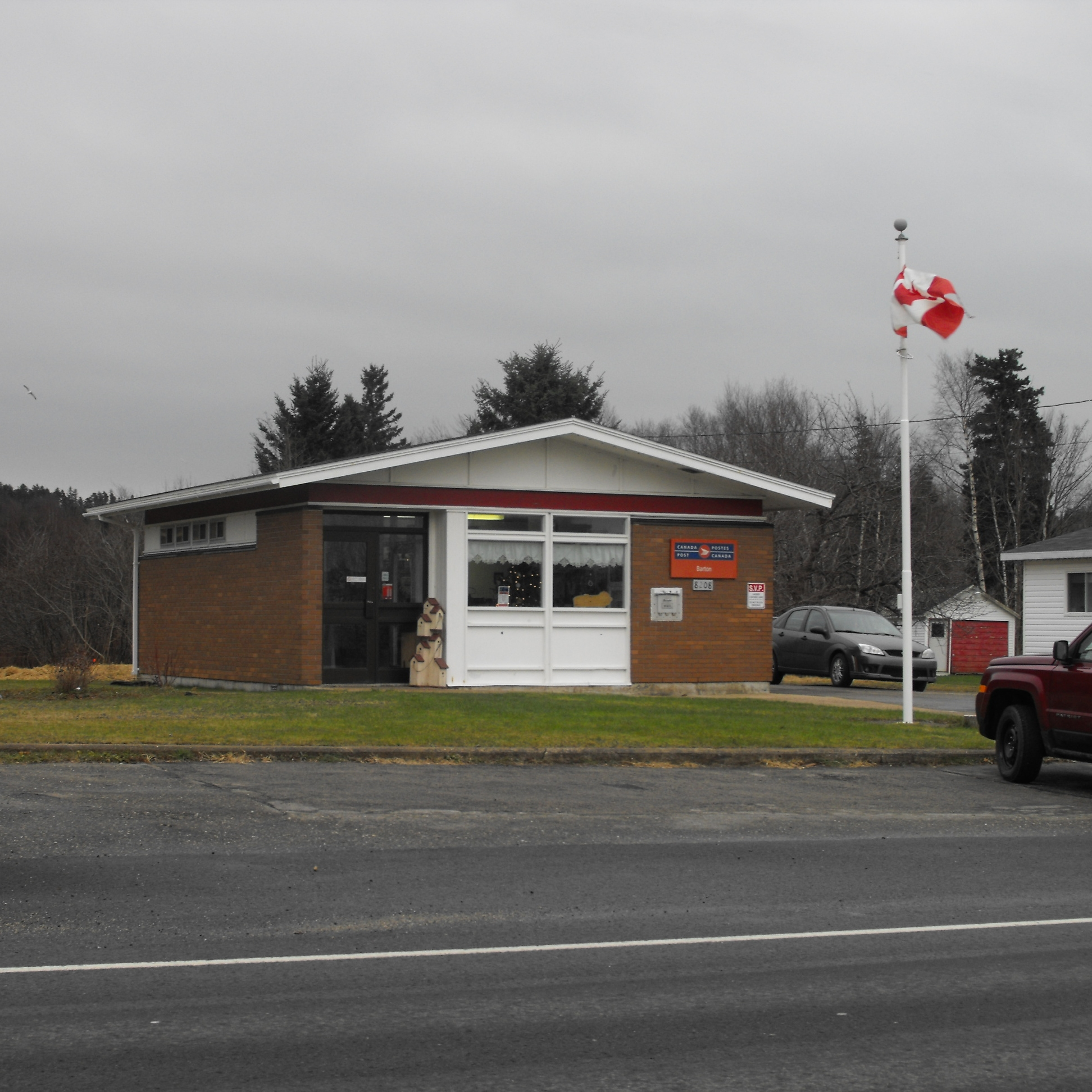
- Barton Post Office
- Interactive map of Barton
- Coordinates: 44°32′13.27″N 65°52′26.48″W
- Country: Canada
- Province: Nova Scotia
- County: Digby County
- District: Clare
- Postal codes: B0W 0C3, B0W 1H0
- Area code: 902

Barton is a community in the Canadian province of Nova Scotia, located in the District of Clare in Digby County. The village is named after the loyalist Lieutenant Colonel Joseph Barton of a New Jersey Volunteer Regiment.
