= Ambroise-Hilaire Comeau =

Canadian politician

The Honourable Ambroise-Hilaire Comeau
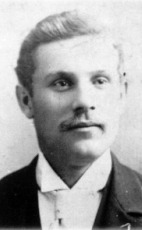

Senator for Nova Scotia
- In office January 15, 1907 – August 25, 1911
- Appointed by: Sir Wilfrid Laurier

MLA for Digby County
- In office May 21, 1890 – January 2, 1907

Personal details
- Born: Ambroise-Hilaire Comeau; September 27, 1860 Saulnierville, Nova Scotia
- Died: August 25, 1911 (aged 50)
- Party: Liberal
- Occupation: Merchant, shoemaker, lumber trade and ship builder

Ambroise-Hilaire Comeau (September 27, 1860 – August 25, 1911) was a merchant and political figure in Nova Scotia, Canada. He represented Digby County in the Nova Scotia House of Assembly from 1890 to 1907 as a Liberal member. He is the first Canadian Senator of Acadian descent from Nova Scotia. His name appears in some sources as Ambrose H. Comeau.

== Biography ==
=== Early years ===
He was born in 1860 in Saulnierville, Nova Scotia, of Acadian descent to Hilaire Comeau and Madeleine LeBlanc. He received his education at Meteghan River and later he attended an English high school at Weymouth Bridge. Upon graduation, he began an apprenticeship in shoemaking.

=== Career ===
In 1876, Comeau opened a shop where he made and sold shoes. His business went well, and he embarked in the lumber and shipbuilding industries. In 1890 he installed the first telephone switchboard for the area in his store.

From 1884 to 1887, Comeau served on the municipal council for Clare and was Warden for the municipality for the two years following. He served on the province's Executive Council as a minister without portfolio. He was named to the Senate of Canada for Digby County in 1907 and served until his death at the age of 51.

=== Community contribution ===
In 1880, Comeau founded the Literary Circle of Clare with several youth of the region. Two of his interests were the promotion of the French language and education. Inspired by Father Jean-Marie Dagnaud, he worked to improve French instruction in Acadian schools and for the publication of French textbooks for schools. He also worked to have bilingual teachers at the Normal School of Truro, Nova Scotia and for the appointment of a superintendent at the Nova Scotia Department of Education responsible for teaching French in schools. He is credited with being one of the founding members of Collège Sainte-Anne in 1890. College Sainte-Anne later became known as Université Sainte Anne. He presented a bill in 1892 to incorporate Collége Saint Anne and allow the institution to award Bachelor's, Master's and Doctorate's degrees.

He published three newspapers in French: L'Echo, journal acadien de la baie Sainte-Marie (lit. 'The Echo, Acadian Newspaper of St. Mary's Bay') in 1884, L'Acadie libérale (lit. 'Liberal Acadia') from 1890 to 1893 and Le Journal de l'Acadie (lit. 'The Newspaper of Acadia') from 1900 to 1904.

=== Personal life ===
Ambroise-Hilaire Comeau married Louise D'Entremont from West Pubnico, Nova Scotia. The couple had six children, one daughter and five sons.

He died August 25, 1911, while in office, of leukemia, three weeks shy of his 51st birthday. His remains are buried at the Sacré-Coeur/Sacred Heart Cemetery in Saulnierville, Nova Scotia.
