= Malcolm Stewart Leonard =

Canadian politician and lawyer

Malcolm Stewart Leonard (March 4, 1911 – November 11, 1962) was a lawyer and political figure in Nova Scotia, Canada. He represented Digby in the Nova Scotia House of Assembly from 1956 to 1960 as a Progressive Conservative member.

== Early life and education ==
He was born in Paradise, Nova Scotia, the son of Robie Stewart Leonard and Ruby E. Darling. Leonard was educated at Acadia University and Dalhousie University.

== Career ==
He was an unsuccessful candidate for a seat in the provincial assembly in 1953. He was named Minister of Education in the province's Executive Council in 1956.

== Death ==
He died on November 11, 1962, in South Range, Nova Scotia, at the age of 51.

== Personal life ==
In 1938, he married Lillian Watkins.
