= John Campbell (Nova Scotia politician) =

Canadian merchant and politician (1849–1887)

John Campbell (July 16, 1849 – May 25, 1887) was a merchant and political figure in Nova Scotia, Canada. He represented Digby in the House of Commons of Canada in 1887 as a Conservative member.

He was born in Weymouth, Nova Scotia, the son of Colin Campbell, who was elected to the Nova Scotia assembly, and the great grandson of Colin Campbell, another member of the Nova Scotia assembly. Campbell was educated in Weymouth and at Abbey Park Institution and St Andrews, Fifeshire, Scotland. He operated a business in London, England from 1871 to 1882 and then returned to Nova Scotia. In 1871, he married Emma Harriet Mundy. Campbell died in office at the age of 37.

== Electoral record ==
1887 Canadian federal election: Digby
Party	Candidate	Votes
Conservative	John Campbell	1,459
Liberal	William Berrian Vail	1,364
