= Pleasant Valley, Colchester County =

Community in Nova Scotia, Canada

Coordinates: 45°14′53.9″N 63°18′36.94″W

Pleasant Valley in Nova Scotia

Pleasant Valley is a community in the Canadian province of Nova Scotia, located in Colchester County.
