= Digby (federal electoral district) =

Former federal electoral district in Nova Scotia, Canada

Nova Scotia electoral district

Defunct federal electoral district
- Legislature: House of Commons
- District created: 1867
- District abolished: 1914
- First contested: 1867
- Last contested: 1911

Demographics
- Census division(s): Digby

Digby was a federal electoral district in Nova Scotia, Canada, that was represented in the House of Commons of Canada from 1867 to 1917. It was created as part of the British North America Act, 1867, and was abolished in 1914 when it was redistributed into Digby and Annapolis and Yarmouth and Clare ridings.

The district consisted of the County of Digby.

== Members of Parliament ==
This riding elected the following members of Parliament:

Parliament	Years	Member	Party
Digby
1st	1867–1869	Alfred William Savary	Anti-Confederation
1st	1869–1872	Alfred William Savary	Conservative
2nd	1872–1874	Alfred William Savary	Conservative
3rd	1874–1874	Edwin Randolph Oakes	Liberal–Conservative
3rd	1874–1877	William Berrian Vail	Liberal
3rd	1878–1878	John Chipman Wade	Conservative
4th	1878–1882	John Chipman Wade	Conservative
5th	1882–1887	William Berrian Vail	Liberal
6th	1887–1887	John Campbell	Conservative
6th	1887–1891	Herbert Ladd Jones	Conservative
7th	1891–1892	Edward Charles Bowers	Liberal
7th	1892–1896	Edward Charles Bowers	Liberal
8th	1896–1900	Albert James Smith Copp	Liberal
9th	1900–1904	Albert James Smith Copp	Liberal
10th	1904–1908	Albert James Smith Copp	Liberal
11th	1908–1911	Clarence Jameson	Conservative
12th	1911–1917	Clarence Jameson	Conservative
Riding dissolved into Digby and Annapolis and Yarmouth and Clare

== Election results ==
1867 Canadian federal election: Digby
Party	Candidate	Votes
Anti-Confederation	Alfred William Savary	792
Liberal–Conservative	John Chipman Wade	497
Unknown	William Mehan	362

1872 Canadian federal election: Digby
Party	Candidate	Votes
Conservative	Alfred William Savary	acclaimed
Source: Canadian Elections Database

1874 Canadian federal election: Digby
Party	Candidate	Votes
Liberal–Conservative	E. Oakes	1,168
Conservative	Alfred Savary	631
Source: Canadian Elections Database

By-election on 26 October 1874 On Mr. Oakes' resignation when appointed to the Legislative Council of Nova Scotia, October 1874
Party	Candidate	Votes
Liberal	William Berrian Vail	932
Unknown	W. H. Taylor	656

By-election on 19 January 1878 On Mr. Vail's resignation, 31 December 1877
Party	Candidate	Votes
Conservative	John Chipman Wade	1,210
Liberal	William Berrian Vail	845

1878 Canadian federal election: Digby
Party	Candidate	Votes
Conservative	John Chipman Wade	1,019
Unknown	P.W. Smith	1,001

1882 Canadian federal election: Digby
Party	Candidate	Votes
Liberal	William Berrian Vail	1,123
Conservative	John Chipman Wade	871

1887 Canadian federal election: Digby
Party	Candidate	Votes
Conservative	John Campbell	1,459
Liberal	William Berrian Vail	1,364

By-election on 16 July 1887 On Mr. Campbell's death, 26 May 1887
Party	Candidate	Votes
Conservative	Herbert Ladd Jones	1,092
Independent	H.M. Robichon	1,056

1891 Canadian federal election: Digby
Party	Candidate	Votes
Liberal	Edward Charles Bowers	1,503
Conservative	Herbert Ladd Jones	1,430

By-election on 13 February 1892 Edward Charles Bowers acclaimed
Party	Candidate	Votes
Liberal	Edward Charles Bowers	acclaimed

1878 Canadian federal election: Digby
Party	Candidate	Votes
Conservative	John Chipman Wade	1,019
Unknown	P.W. Smith	1,001

1900 Canadian federal election: Digby
Party	Candidate	Votes
Liberal	Albert James Smith Copp	1,923
Conservative	J. Edgar Jones	1,418

1904 Canadian federal election: Digby
Party	Candidate	Votes
Liberal	Albert James Smith Copp	1,840
Conservative	John Arthur Grinson	1,096
Independent Liberal	C. Comeau	105

1908 Canadian federal election: Digby
Party	Candidate	Votes
Conservative	Clarence Jameson	1,771
Liberal	Albert James Smith Copp	1,640

1911 Canadian federal election
Party	Candidate	Votes
Conservative	Clarence Jameson	2,126
Liberal	Allan Ellsworth Wall	1,866

== See also ==
- List of Canadian electoral districts
- Historical federal electoral districts of Canada
