= William Berrian Vail =

Canadian politician (1823–194)

The Honourable William Berrian Vail PC
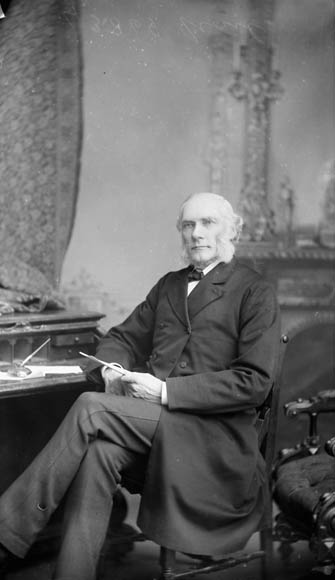

Member of the Canadian Parliament for Digby
- In office 1874–1877
- Preceded by: Edwin Randolph Oakes
- Succeeded by: John Chipman Wade
- In office 1882–1887
- Preceded by: John Chipman Wade
- Succeeded by: John Campbell

Member of the Nova Scotia House of Assembly for Digby County
- In office 1867–1874

Personal details
- Born: December 19, 1823 Sussex Vale, Colony of New Brunswick
- Died: April 10, 1904 (aged 80) Dover, England
- Party: Liberal
- Other political affiliations: Nova Scotia Liberal Party
- Relations: Edwin Arnold Vail, brother
- Cabinet: Provincial: Provincial Secretary (1867-1874); Federal: Minister of Militia and Defence (1874-1878)

William Berrian Vail, PC (December 19, 1823 – April 10, 1904) was a Canadian businessman and politician.

== Biography ==
Vail was born in Sussex Vale, New Brunswick, the son of John Cougle Vail and Charlotte Hannah Arnold. In 1850, he married Charlotte Leslie Jones. He represented Digby County in the Nova Scotia House of Assembly from 1867 to 1874. He served in the province's Executive Council as provincial secretary. In 1874, he was elected to the 3rd Canadian Parliament as the Liberal Member of Parliament for Digby. From 1874 to 1878, he was the Minister of Militia and Defence under Alexander Mackenzie. He resigned because of a conflict of interest in the 1877 but returned to parliament in 1882 where he served as an opposition MP until he lost his seat once again in the 1887 general election. He died in Dover, England.

His brother Edwin Arnold Vail served in the New Brunswick assembly.
