= Eliakim Tupper =

Canadian politician

Eliakim Eddy Tupper (1822 – July 31, 1895) was a block maker and political figure in Nova Scotia, Canada. He represented Digby County in the Nova Scotia House of Assembly from 1890 to 1895 as a Liberal member.

He was born in Round Hill, Nova Scotia, the son of David Tupper. He served as a member of the council for Digby County. Tupper died in office at Bear River.
