= Plympton, Nova Scotia =

Community in Nova Scotia, Canada

Coordinates: 44°30′16.07″N 65°55′0.67″W

Plympton in Nova Scotia

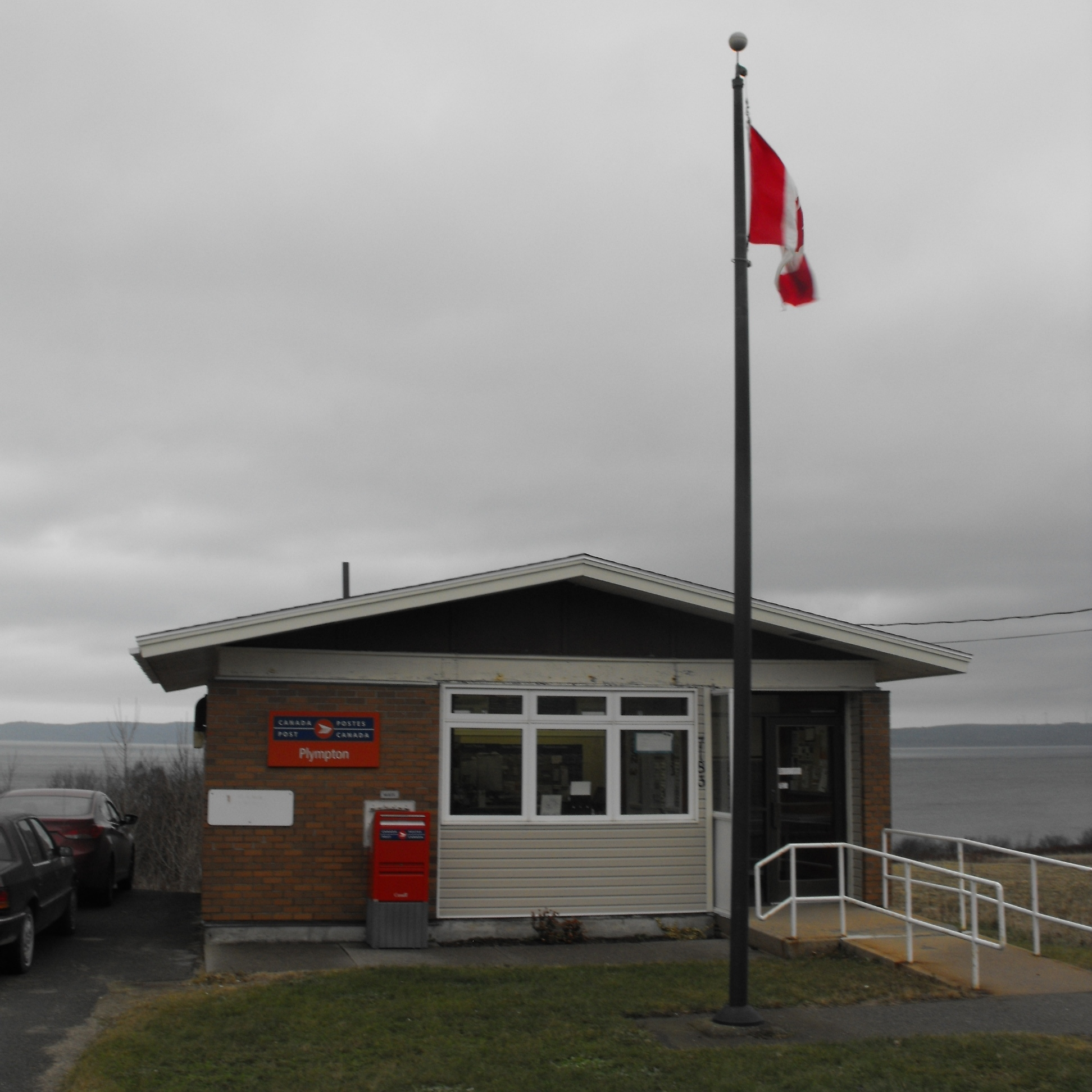
Plympton post office

Plympton is a community in the Canadian province of Nova Scotia, located in the Municipality of the District of Clare in Digby County. It is home to Savary Provincial Park. Notable residents include Alfred William Savary, an early parliamentarian and local historian.

The community was named after Plympton, Massachusetts.
