= Jean-Louis Philippe Robicheau =

Canadian politician

Jean-Louis Philippe Robicheau (June 30, 1874 – March 1, 1948) was a farmer, lumber merchant and political figure in Nova Scotia, Canada. He represented Digby County in the Nova Scotia House of Assembly from 1925 to 1928 as a Liberal-Conservative member. He sat for Digby-Clare division in the Senate of Canada from 1935 to 1948. His name also appears as Jean Louis Philip.

He was born in Meteghan, Digby County, Nova Scotia, the son of Philemon L. Robicheau and Francine Melanson. He was educated at St. Joseph's College and St. Anne's College. In 1907, he married Mary Frances Surette. Robicheau was an agent for the Canadian Pacific Railway from 1910 to 1920. From 1929 to 1932, he was a travelling auditor for the Dominion Atlantic Railway. He died in Maxwellton in Digby County at the age of 73.
