= William Hudson Farnham =

Canadian politician

William Hudson Farnham (December 16, 1869 – April 5, 1940) was a manufacturer and political figure in Nova Scotia, Canada. He represented Digby County in the Nova Scotia House of Assembly from 1925 to 1928 as a Liberal-Conservative member.

He was born in Canard, Nova Scotia, the son of Reuben Farnham and Eliza Hudson. In 1901, Farnham married Blanche S. Barden. He died in Digby at the age of 70.
