= Victor Cardoza =

Canadian politician

Victor George Cardoza (May 25, 1916 – December 15, 1987) was a journalist and political figure in Nova Scotia, Canada. He represented Digby in the Nova Scotia House of Assembly from 1953 to 1956 and from 1960 to 1963 as a Liberal member.

He was born in Waterdown, Ontario (now Hamilton, Ontario), the son of George C. Cardoza and Florence E. Govier, and was educated at the Digby Academy and at Cornell University. In 1945, he married Elizabeth E. Crowe. Cardoza served as a member of the school board, was a member of Digby town council from 1939 to 1954 and was mayor from 1959 to 1961. He was defeated when he ran for reelection in 1956 and 1963.
