= Colchester (provincial electoral district) =

Former provincial electoral district in Nova Scotia, Canada

Nova Scotia electoral district

Defunct provincial electoral district
- Legislature: Nova Scotia House of Assembly
- District created: 1867
- District abolished: 1978
- Last contested: 1974

Colchester was a provincial electoral district in Nova Scotia, Canada, that elected two members to the Nova Scotia House of Assembly. It existed from 1867 to 1978 and included all of Colchester County. In 1978, Colchester was divided into three electoral districts, Colchester North, Colchester South, and Truro-Bible Hill.

== Election results ==
=== 1974 ===
1974 Nova Scotia general election
Party	Candidate	Votes	%	Elected
Liberal	Melinda MacLean	9,514	25.87%	✓
Liberal	Floyd Tucker	8,662	23.55%	✓
Progressive Conservative	Ron Giffin	7,974	21.68%	
Progressive Conservative	Gerald Ritcey	7,182	19.53%	
New Democratic	Allan M. Marchbank	1,771	4.82%	
New Democratic	Eda Forsythe	1,515	4.12%	
Independent	Robert Kirk	159	0.43%	
Total number of valid votes		36,777	100.00	
Rejected ballots		144	0.74	
Number of electors who cast votes/Turnout		19,340	75.60	
Eligible voters		25,582		
Source(s) Source: Nova Scotia Legislature (2024). "Electoral History for Colchester County" (PDF). nslegislature.ca. Nova Scotia, Chief Electoral Officer (1974). Returns of the General Election for the House of Assembly, Twenty-Eighth General Election (PDF) (Report). Queen's Printer. Archived from the original (PDF) on 18 June 2018.

=== 1970 ===
1970 Nova Scotia general election
Party	Candidate	Votes	%	Elected
Progressive Conservative	George Isaac Smith	9,398	28.81%	✓
Progressive Conservative	Gerald Ritcey	8,012	24.56%	✓
Liberal	George Norrie	7,901	24.22%	
Liberal	Ross Hill	7,313	22.42%	
Total		32,624	–	
Source(s) Source: Nova Scotia Legislature (2024). "Electoral History for Colchester County" (PDF). nslegislature.ca. Nova Scotia, Legislative Assembly (1970). Returns of the General Election for the House of Assembly, 1970 (PDF) (Report). Queen's Printer. Archived from the original (PDF) on 25 July 2018.

=== 1968 ===
Nova Scotia provincial by-election, 1968-02-13
Party	Candidate	Votes	%	Elected
Progressive Conservative	Gerald Ritcey	8,067	53.88%	✓
Liberal	Hector Hill	6,904	46.12%	
Total		14,971	–	
Source(s) Source: Nova Scotia Legislature (2024). "Electoral History for Colchester County" (PDF). nslegislature.ca.

=== 1967 ===
1967 Nova Scotia general election
Party	Candidate	Votes	%	Elected
Progressive Conservative	Robert Stanfield	9,091	31.04%	✓
Progressive Conservative	George Isaac Smith	8,485	28.97%	✓
Liberal	Charles K. Sutherland	5,348	18.26%	
Liberal	George Pulsifer	5,344	18.25%	
New Democratic	Cecil Delaney	509	1.74%	
New Democratic	Arthur Benedict	507	1.73%	
Total		29,284	–	
Source(s) Source: Nova Scotia Legislature (2024). "Electoral History for Colchester County" (PDF). nslegislature.ca. Nova Scotia Legislature (1967). Returns of the General Election for the House of Assembly (PDF) (Report). Queen's Printer. Archived from the original (PDF) on 25 July 2018.

=== 1963 ===
1963 Nova Scotia general election
Party	Candidate	Votes	%	Elected
Progressive Conservative	Robert Stanfield	9,606	32.42%	✓
Progressive Conservative	George Isaac Smith	9,147	30.87%	✓
Liberal	Gordon Purdy	5,515	18.61%	
Liberal	Charles K. Sutherland	4,746	16.02%	
New Democratic	Harvey Curtis	382	1.29%	
New Democratic	Helen Wright	233	0.79%	
Total		29,629	–	
Source(s) Source: Nova Scotia Legislature (2024). "Electoral History for Colchester County" (PDF). nslegislature.ca. Nova Scotia Legislature (1963). Returns of the General Election for the House of Assembly (PDF) (Report). Queen's Printer. Archived from the original (PDF) on 25 July 2018.

=== 1960 ===
1960 Nova Scotia general election
Party	Candidate	Votes	%	Elected
Progressive Conservative	Robert Stanfield	8,574	28.82%	✓
Progressive Conservative	George Isaac Smith	8,219	27.62%	✓
Liberal	Gordon Purdy	6,127	20.59%	
Liberal	Hugh Charles McKinnon	5,439	18.28%	
Co-operative Commonwealth	Harvey Curtis	704	2.37%	
Co-operative Commonwealth	Helen Wright	692	2.33%	
Total		29,755	–	
Source(s) Source: Nova Scotia Legislature (2024). "Electoral History for Colchester County" (PDF). nslegislature.ca. Nova Scotia Legislature (1960). Returns of the General Election for the House of Assembly (PDF) (Report). Queen's Printer. Archived from the original (PDF) on 25 July 2018.

=== 1956 ===
1956 Nova Scotia general election
Party	Candidate	Votes	%	Elected
Progressive Conservative	Robert Stanfield	8,476	27.86%	✓
Progressive Conservative	George Isaac Smith	8,057	26.48%	✓
Liberal	Hector Hill	6,733	22.13%	
Liberal	Margaret Norrie	6,664	21.91%	
Co-operative Commonwealth	Arnold Lyons	251	0.83%	
Co-operative Commonwealth	William Wright	240	0.79%	
Total		30,421	–	
Source(s) Source: Nova Scotia Legislature (2024). "Electoral History for Colchester County" (PDF). nslegislature.ca. Nova Scotia Legislature (1956). Returns of the General Election for the House of Assembly (PDF) (Report). Queen's Printer. Archived from the original (PDF) on 10 September 2018.

=== 1953 ===
1953 Nova Scotia general election
Party	Candidate	Votes	%	Elected
Progressive Conservative	Robert Stanfield	7,677	25.61%	✓
Progressive Conservative	George Isaac Smith	7,435	24.80%	✓
Liberal	Gordon Purdy	7,255	24.20%	
Liberal	Hector Hill	6,963	23.23%	
Co-operative Commonwealth	Sydney R. Parker	326	1.09%	
Co-operative Commonwealth	Harvey T. Curtis	324	1.08%	
Total		29,980	–	
Source(s) Source: Nova Scotia Legislature (2024). "Electoral History for Colchester County" (PDF). nslegislature.ca. Nova Scotia Legislature (1953). Returns of the General Election for the House of Assembly (PDF) (Report). Queen's Printer. Archived from the original (PDF) on 10 September 2018.

=== 1949 ===
1949 Nova Scotia general election
Party	Candidate	Votes	%	Elected
Progressive Conservative	Robert Stanfield	8,081	26.94%	✓
Progressive Conservative	George Isaac Smith	7,580	25.27%	✓
Liberal	W. J. MacDonald	6,968	23.23%	
Liberal	Robert F. McLellan	6,857	22.86%	
Co-operative Commonwealth	A. L. Lynds	513	1.71%	
Total		29,999	–	
Source(s) Source: Nova Scotia Legislature (2024). "Electoral History for Colchester County" (PDF). nslegislature.ca. Nova Scotia Legislature (1949). Returns of the General Election for the House of Assembly (PDF) (Report). Queen's Printer. Archived from the original (PDF) on 10 September 2018.

=== 1945 ===
1945 Nova Scotia general election
Party	Candidate	Votes	%	Elected
Liberal	Gordon Purdy	7,714	29.18%	✓
Liberal	Robert F. McLellan	6,631	25.09%	✓
Progressive Conservative	Frederick Murray Blois	5,515	20.86%	
Progressive Conservative	William A. Flemming	5,383	20.37%	
Co-operative Commonwealth	Sidney Mansfield Parker	642	2.43%	
Co-operative Commonwealth	Clarence Vincent Fleury	547	2.07%	
Total		26,432	–	
Source(s) Source: Nova Scotia Legislature (2024). "Electoral History for Colchester County" (PDF). nslegislature.ca. Nova Scotia Legislature (1945). Returns of the General Election for the House of Assembly (PDF) (Report). Queen's Printer. Archived from the original (PDF) on 10 September 2018.

=== 1941 ===
1941 Nova Scotia general election
Party	Candidate	Votes	%	Elected
Progressive Conservative	Frederick Murray Blois	5,842	26.88%	✓
Progressive Conservative	George Scott Dickey	5,432	24.99%	✓
Liberal	Robert F. McLellan	5,301	24.39%	
Liberal	Alexander Murdoch Sutherland	5,160	23.74%	
Total		21,735	–	
Source(s) Source: Nova Scotia Legislature (2024). "Electoral History for Colchester County" (PDF). nslegislature.ca. Nova Scotia Legislature (1941). Returns of the General Election for the House of Assembly (PDF) (Report). Queen's Printer. Archived from the original (PDF) on 8 February 2024.

=== 1940 ===
Nova Scotia provincial by-election, 1940-10-28
Party	Candidate	Votes	%	Elected
Progressive Conservative	George Scott Dickey	acclaimed	N/A	✓
Total			–	
Source(s) Source: Nova Scotia Legislature (2024). "Electoral History for Colchester County" (PDF). nslegislature.ca.

=== 1937 ===
1937 Nova Scotia general election
Party	Candidate	Votes	%	Elected
Progressive Conservative	Frederick Murray Blois	6,698	27.13%	✓
Progressive Conservative	George Y. Thomas	6,587	26.68%	✓
Liberal	Harry B. Havey	5,791	23.45%	
Liberal	Edward G. McColough	5,614	22.74%	
Total		24,690	–	
Source(s) Source: Nova Scotia Legislature (2024). "Electoral History for Colchester County" (PDF). nslegislature.ca. Nova Scotia Legislature (1937). Returns of the General Election for the House of Assembly (PDF) (Report). Queen's Printer. Archived from the original (PDF) on 1 March 2019.

=== 1933 ===
1933 Nova Scotia general election
Party	Candidate	Votes	%	Elected
Liberal-Conservative	William A. Flemming	6,748	27.04%	✓
Liberal-Conservative	George Y. Thomas	6,398	25.64%	✓
Liberal	Thomas R. Johnson	6,043	24.21%	
Liberal	R. Edgar McLeod	5,769	23.11%	
Total		24,958	–	
Source(s) Source: Nova Scotia Legislature (2024). "Electoral History for Colchester County" (PDF). nslegislature.ca. Nova Scotia Legislature (1933). Returns of the General Election for the House of Assembly (PDF) (Report). Queen's Printer. Archived from the original (PDF) on 1 March 2019.

=== 1928 ===
1928 Nova Scotia general election
Party	Candidate	Votes	%	Elected
Liberal-Conservative	Frank Stanfield	5,298	30.10%	✓
Liberal-Conservative	William A. Flemming	4,882	27.74%	✓
Liberal	Donald L. MacKinnon	3,839	21.81%	
Liberal	William R. Dunbar	3,583	20.36%	
Total		17,602	–	
Source(s) Source: Nova Scotia Legislature (2024). "Electoral History for Colchester County" (PDF). nslegislature.ca.

=== 1925 ===
1925 Nova Scotia general election
Party	Candidate	Votes	%	Elected
Liberal-Conservative	William Boardman Armstrong	6,733	36.86%	✓
Liberal-Conservative	Frank Stanfield	6,439	35.25%	✓
Liberal	Maynard B. Archibald	2,634	14.42%	
Liberal	Frank A. Reynolds	2,461	13.47%	
Total		18,267	–	
Source(s) Source: Nova Scotia Legislature (2024). "Electoral History for Colchester County" (PDF). nslegislature.ca.

=== 1920 ===
1920 Nova Scotia general election
Party	Candidate	Votes	%	Elected
United Farmers	Robert Hunter Smith	3,533	26.64%	✓
United Farmers	Harry L. Taggart	3,420	25.79%	✓
Liberal-Conservative	William R. Dunbar	3,213	24.23%	
Liberal-Conservative	Robert H. Kennedy	3,096	23.34%	
Total		13,262	–	
Source(s) Source: Nova Scotia Legislature (2024). "Electoral History for Colchester County" (PDF). nslegislature.ca.

=== 1916 ===
1916 Nova Scotia general election
Party	Candidate	Votes	%	Elected
Liberal-Conservative	Frank Stanfield	2,745	28.07%	✓
Liberal-Conservative	Robert H. Kennedy	2,665	27.25%	✓
Liberal	Gilbert H. Vernon	2,212	22.62%	
Liberal	Frederick B. Schurman	2,158	22.07%	
Total		9,780	–	
Source(s) Source: Nova Scotia Legislature (2024). "Electoral History for Colchester County" (PDF). nslegislature.ca.

=== 1911 ===
1911 Nova Scotia general election
Party	Candidate	Votes	%	Elected
Liberal-Conservative	Frank Stanfield	2,592	26.53%	✓
Liberal-Conservative	Robert H. Kennedy	2,522	25.82%	✓
Liberal	William Davison Hill	2,449	25.07%	
Liberal	Benjamin Franklin Pearson	2,206	22.58%	
Total		9,769	–	
Source(s) Source: Nova Scotia Legislature (2024). "Electoral History for Colchester County" (PDF). nslegislature.ca.

=== 1906 ===
1906 Nova Scotia general election
Party	Candidate	Votes	%	Elected
Liberal	William Davison Hill	2,567	28.76%	✓
Liberal	Benjamin Franklin Pearson	2,386	26.73%	✓
Liberal-Conservative	J. H. McCleave	2,177	24.39%	
Liberal-Conservative	John Suckling	1,795	20.11%	
Total		8,925	–	
Source(s) Source: Nova Scotia Legislature (2024). "Electoral History for Colchester County" (PDF). nslegislature.ca.

=== 1904 ===
Nova Scotia provincial by-election, 1904-12-15
Party	Candidate	Votes	%	Elected
Liberal	Henry T. Laurence	1,928	52.55%	✓
Liberal-Conservative	John Suckling	1,741	47.45%	
Total		3,669	–	
Source(s) Source: Nova Scotia Legislature (2024). "Electoral History for Colchester County" (PDF). nslegislature.ca.

=== 1901 ===
1901 Nova Scotia general election
Party	Candidate	Votes	%	Elected
Liberal	Frederick Andrew Laurence	2,185	25.53%	✓
Liberal	Benjamin Franklin Pearson	2,169	25.34%	✓
Liberal-Conservative	A. S. Black	2,151	25.13%	
Liberal-Conservative	J. F. Stairs	2,054	24.00%	
Total		8,559	–	
Source(s) Source: Nova Scotia Legislature (2024). "Electoral History for Colchester County" (PDF). nslegislature.ca.

=== 1897 ===
1897 Nova Scotia general election
Party	Candidate	Votes	%	Elected
Liberal-Conservative	Thomas McMullen	2,363	25.55%	✓
Liberal	Frederick Andrew Laurence	2,358	25.50%	✓
Liberal-Conservative	Wilbert David Dimock	2,286	24.72%	
Liberal	Alfred Dickie	2,240	24.22%	
Total		9,247	–	
Source(s) Source: Nova Scotia Legislature (2024). "Electoral History for Colchester County" (PDF). nslegislature.ca.

=== 1896 ===
Nova Scotia provincial by-election, 1896-08-15
Party	Candidate	Votes	%	Elected
Liberal	Firman McClure	2,233	54.28%	✓
Liberal-Conservative	Richard J. Turner	1,881	45.72%	
Total		4,114	–	
Source(s) Source: Nova Scotia Legislature (2024). "Electoral History for Colchester County" (PDF). nslegislature.ca.

=== 1895 ===
Nova Scotia provincial by-election, 1895-01-30
Party	Candidate	Votes	%	Elected
Liberal-Conservative	Wilbert David Dimock	acclaimed	N/A	✓
Total			–	
Source(s) Source: Nova Scotia Legislature (2024). "Electoral History for Colchester County" (PDF). nslegislature.ca.

=== 1894 ===
1894 Nova Scotia general election
Party	Candidate	Votes	%	Elected
Liberal-Conservative	Wilbert David Dimock	1,955	25.88%	✓
Liberal	Frederick Andrew Laurence	1,896	25.10%	✓
Liberal-Conservative	Israel Longworth	1,890	25.02%	
Liberal	Alfred Dickie	1,814	24.01%	
Total		7,555	–	
Source(s) Source: Nova Scotia Legislature (2024). "Electoral History for Colchester County" (PDF). nslegislature.ca.

=== 1890 ===
1890 Nova Scotia general election
Party	Candidate	Votes	%	Elected
Liberal	Frederick Andrew Laurence	1,904	25.71%	✓
Liberal	George Clarke	1,868	25.22%	✓
Liberal-Conservative	Israel Longworth	1,842	24.87%	
Liberal-Conservative	William Albert Patterson	1,793	24.21%	
Total		7,407	–	
Source(s) Source: Nova Scotia Legislature (2024). "Electoral History for Colchester County" (PDF). nslegislature.ca.

=== 1886 ===
1886 Nova Scotia general election
Party	Candidate	Votes	%	Elected
Liberal	George Clarke	2,053	27.47%	✓
Liberal	Frederick Andrew Laurence	1,938	25.93%	✓
Liberal-Conservative	William Albert Patterson	1,782	23.85%	
Liberal-Conservative	Seymour Eugene Gourley	1,700	22.75%	
Total		7,473	–	
Source(s) Source: Nova Scotia Legislature (2024). "Electoral History for Colchester County" (PDF). nslegislature.ca.

=== 1882 ===
1882 Nova Scotia general election
Party	Candidate	Votes	%	Elected
Liberal-Conservative	William Blair	1,507	24.64%	✓
Liberal-Conservative	William Albert Patterson	1,497	24.48%	✓
Liberal	S. D. McLellan	1,387	22.68%	
Liberal	W. H. Guild	1,251	20.45%	
Independent	S. Rettie	474	7.75%	
Total		6,116	–	
Source(s) Source: Nova Scotia Legislature (2024). "Electoral History for Colchester County" (PDF). nslegislature.ca.

=== 1878 ===
1878 Nova Scotia general election
Party	Candidate	Votes	%	Elected
Liberal-Conservative	William Blair	1,885	29.27%	✓
Liberal-Conservative	William Albert Patterson	1,846	28.66%	✓
Liberal	C.N. Cummings	1,402	21.77%	
Liberal	Fred Tupper	1,308	20.31%	
Total		6,441	–	
Source(s) Source: Nova Scotia Legislature (2024). "Electoral History for Colchester County" (PDF). nslegislature.ca.

=== 1874 ===
1874 Nova Scotia general election
Party	Candidate	Votes	%	Elected
Liberal-Conservative	William Albert Patterson	1,718	30.81%	✓
Liberal	John Barnhill Dickie	1,687	30.25%	✓
Liberal	Robert Putnam	1,126	20.19%	
Liberal	Thomas Fletcher Morrison	1,046	18.76%	
Total		5,577	–	
Source(s) Source: Nova Scotia Legislature (2024). "Electoral History for Colchester County" (PDF). nslegislature.ca.

=== 1871 ===
1871 Nova Scotia general election
Party	Candidate	Votes	%	Elected
Liberal	Thomas Fletcher Morrison		N/A	✓
Liberal-Conservative	Samuel Rettie		N/A	✓
Total			–	
Source(s) Source: Nova Scotia Legislature (2024). "Electoral History for Colchester County" (PDF). nslegislature.ca.

=== 1867 ===
1867 Nova Scotia general election
Party	Candidate	Votes	%	Elected
Anti-Confederation	Thomas Fletcher Morrison	1,641	28.59%	✓
Anti-Confederation	Robert Chambers	1,625	28.32%	✓
Confederation	Samuel Rettie	1,311	22.84%	
Confederation	N. McKim	1,162	20.25%	
Total		5,739	–	
Source(s) Source: Nova Scotia Legislature (2024). "Electoral History for Colchester County" (PDF). nslegislature.ca.

== See also ==
- List of Nova Scotia provincial electoral districts
- Canadian provincial electoral districts
