= 1974 Nova Scotia general election =

Canadian provincial election

- April 2, 1974

46 seats of the Nova Scotia House of Assembly 24 seats needed for a majority
- Turnout: 77.89% ▲0.57pp
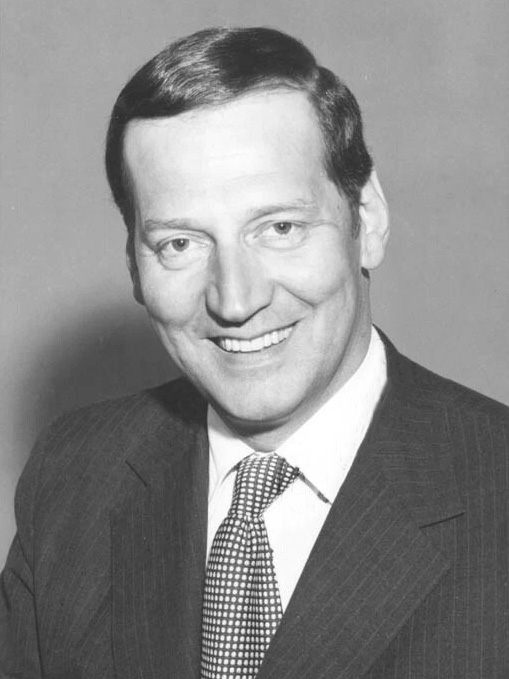

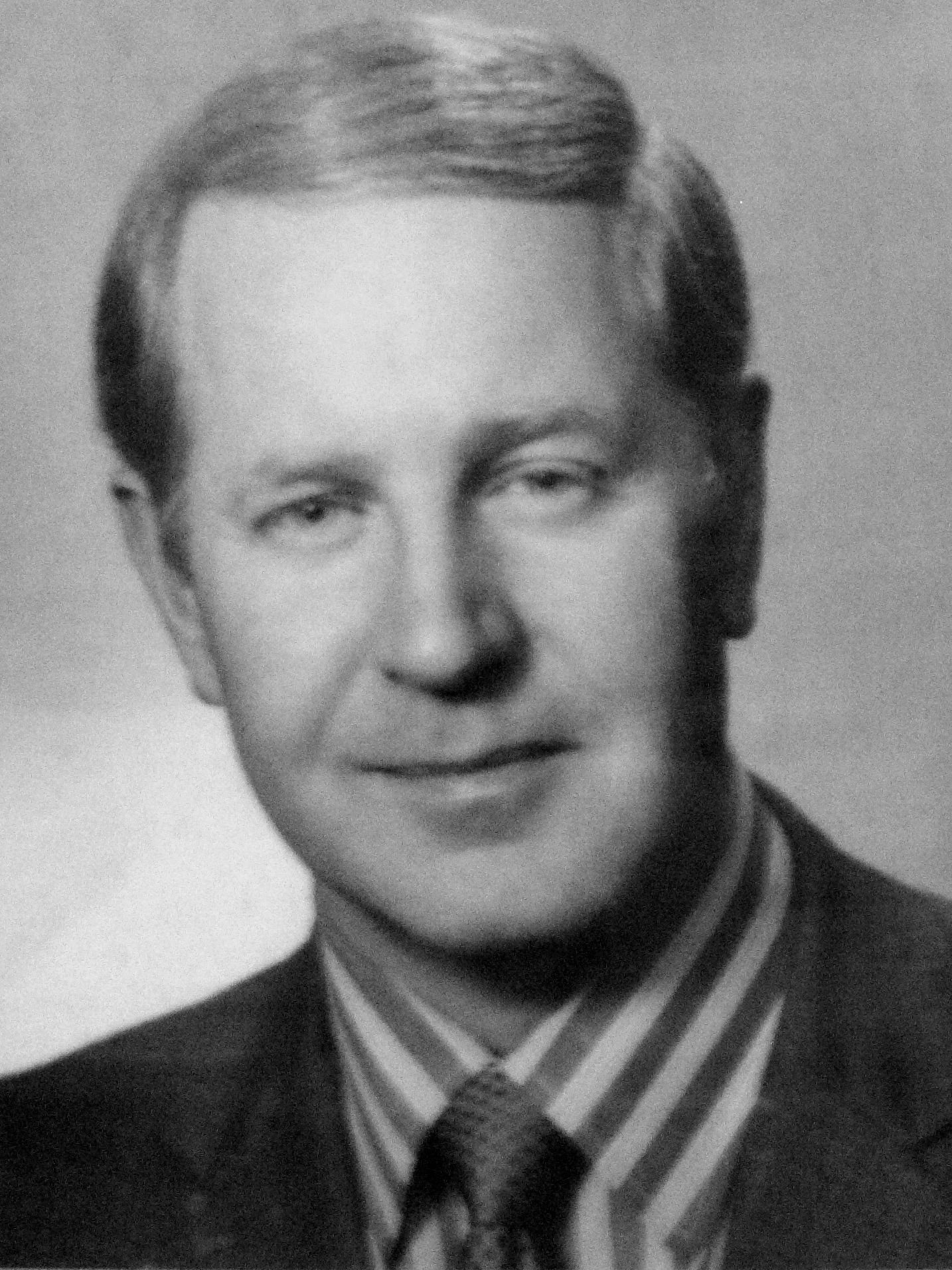

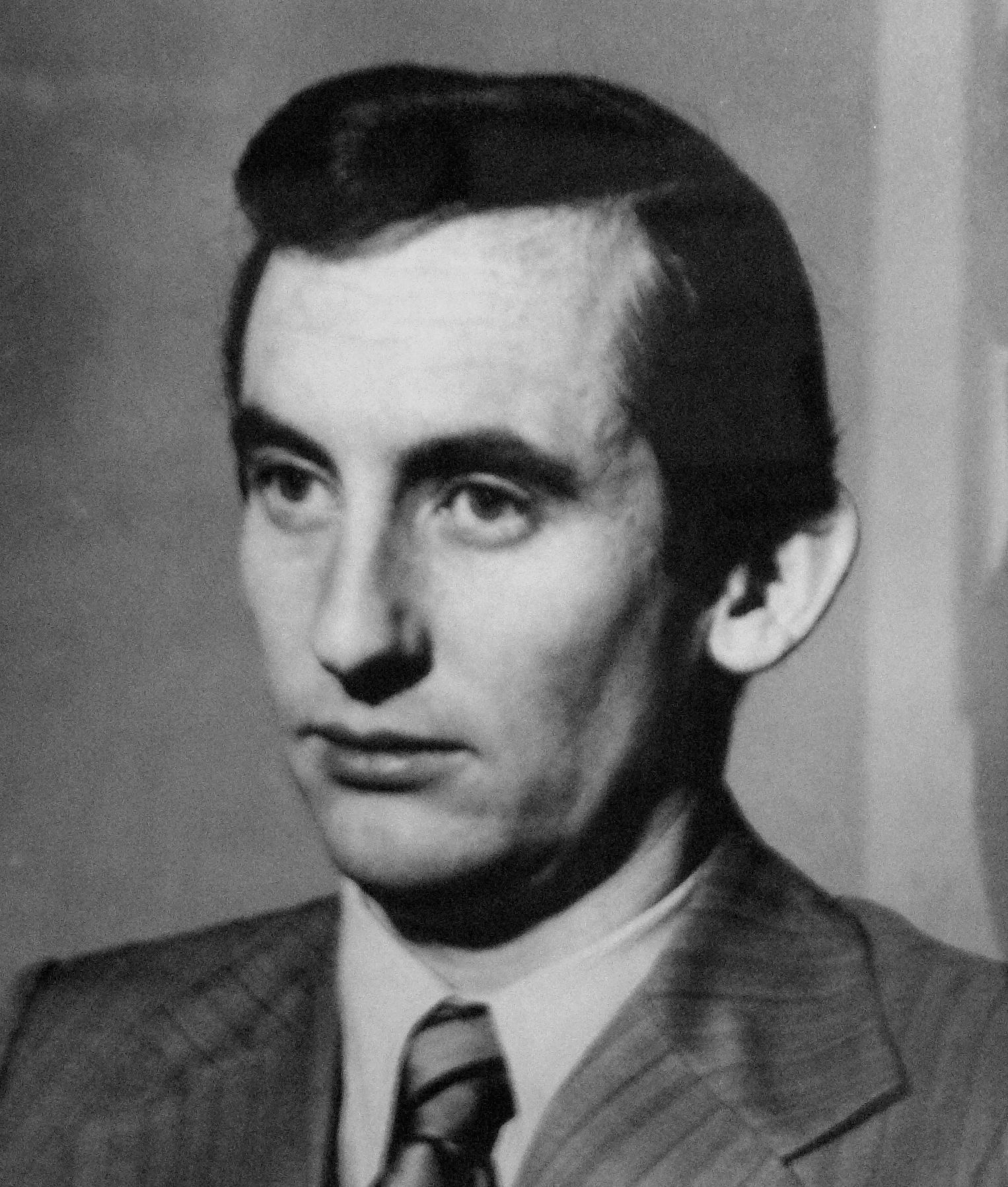
	First party	Second party	Third party
Leader	Gerald Regan	John Buchanan	Jeremy Akerman
Party	Liberal	Progressive Conservative	New Democratic
Leader since	July 24, 1965	March 6, 1971	November 9, 1968
Leader's seat	Halifax Needham	Halifax Atlantic	Cape Breton East
Last election	23	21	2
Seats won	31	12	3
Seat change	▲8	▼9	▲1
Popular vote	206,648	166,388	55,902
Percentage	47.57%	38.31%	12.87%
Swing	▲1.94pp	▼8.12pp	▲6.28pp
Premier before election
Gerald Regan
Liberal
Premier after election
Gerald Regan
Liberal

The 1974 Nova Scotia general election was held on 2 April 1974 to elect members of the 51st House of Assembly of the Province of Nova Scotia, Canada. It was won by the Liberal Party.

Most of its MLAs were elected in single-member district using first past the post voting but some, such as in Colchester and Yarmouth, were elected in two-seat districts using plurality block voting.

== Results ==
=== Results by party ===
↓
31	12	3
Liberal	Progressive Conservative	New Democratic

Official results
Party	Party leader	# of candidates	Seats				Popular vote		
Party	Party leader	# of candidates	1970	Dissolution	Elected	Change	#	%	Change (pp)
Liberal	Gerald Regan	46	23	24	31	+8	206,648	47.57%	+1.94%
Progressive Conservative	John Buchanan	46	21	19	12	-9	166,388	38.31%	-8.12%
New Democratic	Jeremy Akerman	46	2	2	3	+1	55,902	12.87%	+6.28%
Independent		6	0	1	0	0	2,220	0.51%	+0.13%
Vacant				0					
Total valid votes							431,158	99.26%	+0.23%
Blank and invalid ballots							3,205	0.74%	-0.23%
Total		144	46	46	46	–	434,363	100.00%	–
Registered voters / turnout							507,190	77.89%	+0.57%

Popular vote
Liberal	47.57%
PC	38.31%
New Democratic	12.87%
Independent	0.51%

Seats summary
Liberal	67.39%
PC	26.09%
New Democratic	6.52%

=== Results by region ===
Party name		HRM	Cape Breton	Annapolis Valley	South Shore	Fundy-Northeast	Central Nova	Total
Parties winning seats in the legislature
Liberal	Seats:	8	6	6	4	4	3	31
Liberal	Popular vote:	48.73%	42.68%	51.25%	51.37%	48.19%	48.05%	47.57%
Progressive Conservative	Seats:	2	1	2	3	2	2	12
Progressive Conservative	Popular vote:	38.34%	32.67%	42.11%	39.63%	42.33%	41.57%	38.31%
New Democratic Party	Seats:	0	3	0	0	0	0	3
New Democratic Party	Popular vote:	12.93%	24.21%	6.64%	6.48%	9.06%	10.37%	12.87%
Parties not winning seats in the legislature
Independent	Popular vote:	–	0.45%	–	2.52%	0.42%	–	0.51%
Total seats:		10	10	8	7	6	5	46

== Retiring incumbents ==
Liberal

- James L. Connolly, Halifax Chebucto
- Ralph F. Fiske, Pictou Centre
- A. Lloyd MacDonald, Pictou East
- George Riley, Halifax Cobequid

Progressive Conservative

- Gerald Doucet, Richmond
- Floyd MacDonald, Queens
- George Isaac Smith, Colchester
- Victor Thorpe, Kings North
- Maurice L. Zinck, Lunenburg East

== Nominated candidates ==
Legend
bold denotes party leader
† denotes an incumbent who is not running for re-election or was defeated in nomination contest

=== Valley ===
Electoral district	Candidates				Incumbent
Electoral district	Liberal	PC	NDP	Independent	Incumbent
Annapolis East	Hank De Boer; 2,583; 43.48%	Gerry Sheehy; 3,134; 52.76%	Murray A. Bent; 223; 3.75%		Gerry Sheehy
Annapolis West	Peter M. Nicholson; 2,636; 53.00%	J.R. Kerr; 2,150; 43.22%	David N. Lowe; 188; 3.78%		Peter M. Nicholson
Clare	Benoit Comeau; 2,959; 61.07%	Vincent L. Doucet; 1,218; 25.14%	Jean L. Belliveau; 668; 13.79%		Benoit Comeau
Digby	Joseph H. Casey; 3,525; 65.90%	John R. Nichols; 1,590; 29.73%	C.B. Haight; 234; 4.37%		Joseph H. Casey
Hants West	Robert D. Lindsay; 4,148; 48.07%	Ron Russell; 3,707; 42.96%	Gary E. Tonks; 774; 8.97%		Robert D. Lindsay
Kings North	Glenn Ells; 3,536; 49.39%	David J. Waterbury; 3,124; 43.63%	George W. Graves; 500; 6.98%		Victor Thorpe†
Kings South	Edgar K. Aston; 1,999; 33.11%	Harry How; 3,576; 59.22%	John P. O'Meara; 463; 7.67%		Harry How
Kings West	Frank Bezanson; 5,031; 58.34%	Kathleen E. Howlett; 3,206; 37.23%	Donald Wolsey; 374; 4.34%		Frank Bezanson

=== South Shore ===
Electoral district	Candidates				Incumbent
Electoral district	Liberal	PC	NDP	Independent	Incumbent
Lunenburg Centre	James Kinley; 3,878; 39.08%	Bruce Cochran; 4,086; 41.18%	Ralph E. Deamond; 421; 4.24%	Walton Cook; 1,538; 15.50%	Walton Cook
Lunenburg East	Joseph Saunders; 1,963; 41.06%	Ron Barkhouse; 2,536; 53.04%	Anthony W.E. Zinck; 282; 5.90%		Maurice L. Zinck†
Lunenburg West	Maurice DeLory; 3,635; 54.92%	Ella Spence; 2,643; 39.93%	William R. Griswold; 341; 5.15%		Maurice DeLory
Queens	R. Keith Wyer; 2,649; 40.58%	John Wickwire; 2,905; 44.50%	A.J. d'Entremont; 974; 14.92%		Floyd MacDonald†
Shelburne	Harold Huskilson; 4,119; 47.58%	Ron Hatfield; 3,732; 43.11%	Dewey Waybret; 806; 9.31%		Harold Huskilson
Yarmouth	Fraser Mooney; 8,098; 32.87%	Martin Cottreau; 4,029; 16.35%	Lawrence Dukeshire; 637; 2.59%		Fraser Mooney
Yarmouth	Hugh Tinkham; 7,068; 28.69%	George A. Snow; 4,300; 17.45%	Leslie Babin; 504; 2.05%		George A. Snow

=== Fundy-Northeast ===
Electoral district	Candidates				Incumbent
Electoral district	Liberal	PC	NDP	Independent	Incumbent
Colchester	Melinda MacLean; 9,514; 25.87%	Gerald Ritcey; 7,182; 19.53%	Eda Forsythe; 1,515; 4.12%	Bob Kirk; 159; 0.43%	Gerald Ritcey
Colchester	Floyd Tucker; 8,662; 23.55%	Ron Giffin; 7,974; 21.68%	Allan Marchbank; 1,771; 4.82%		George Isaac Smith†
Cumberland Centre	Guy Brown; 2,283; 52.16%	Raymond M. Smith; 1,601; 36.58%	Elory Tabor; 493; 11.26%		Raymond M. Smith
Cumberland East	Ronald S. MacNeil; 3,490; 40.82%	Roger Stuart Bacon; 4,125; 48.25%	David W. D'Aubin; 934; 10.93%		Roger Stuart Bacon
Cumberland West	W.J. Brown; 2,205; 45.86%	D. L. George Henley; 2,323; 48.32%	A. Bradley Colpitts; 280; 5.82%		D. L. George Henley
Hants East	Jack Hawkins; 3,322; 49.88%	Avard Ettinger; 2,690; 40.39%	Clair White; 549; 8.24%	John G. Stanhope Sr. 99; 1.49%	Jack Hawkins

=== Halifax/Dartmouth/Eastern Shore ===
Electoral district	Candidates				Incumbent
Electoral district	Liberal	PC	NDP	Independent	Incumbent
Halifax Atlantic	Darrell E. Wentzell; 4,380; 35.90%	**John Buchanan**; 6,229; 51.06%	Colin Campbell; 1,591; 13.04%		John Buchanan
Halifax Chebucto	Walter Fitzgerald; 5,608; 53.47%	Dennis Ashworth; 3,233; 30.82%	Burris Devanney; 1,648; 15.71%		James L. Connolly†
Halifax Citadel	Ronald Wallace; 4,299; 48.73%	Richard MacLean; 3,071; 34.81%	Michael Bradfield; 1,452; 16.46%		Ronald Wallace
Halifax Cobequid	George Doucet; 8,691; 49.57%	Silvia Hudson; 6,878; 39.23%	George C. Cann; 1,964; 11.20%		George Riley†
Halifax Cornwallis	George M. Mitchell; 5,391; 47.52%	George T.H. Cooper; 3,833; 33.79%	Muriel Duckworth; 2,121; 18.70%		George M. Mitchell
Halifax Eastern Shore	Alexander Garnet Brown; 6,437; 52.90%	Hanson D. Josey; 4,205; 34.56%	John T. Kennedy; 1,527; 12.55%		Alexander Garnet Brown
Halifax Needham	**Gerald Regan**; 4,364; 61.49%	James H. Vaughan; 1,854; 26.12%	Martin Dolin; 879; 12.39%		Gerald Regan
Halifax-St. Margaret's	Leonard L. Pace; 7,238; 47.87%	George C. Piercey; 6,084; 40.24%	Richard Rogers; 1,798; 11.89%		Leonard L. Pace
Dartmouth North	Glen M. Bagnell; 7,091; 51.41%	Richard L. Weldon; 4,839; 35.08%	Joseph Bouchard; 1,863; 13.51%		Glen M. Bagnell
Dartmouth South	D. Scott MacNutt; 5,871; 44.24%	Roland J. Thornhill; 6,491; 48.91%	Norman H. Dares; 908; 6.84%		D. Scott MacNutt

=== Central Nova ===
Electoral district	Candidates				Incumbent
Electoral district	Liberal	PC	NDP	Independent	Incumbent
Antigonish	Bill Gillis; 5,141; 56.88%	Ronald A. MacDonald; 3,172; 35.09%	Patrick D. Gough; 726; 8.03%		Bill Gillis
Guysborough	A.M. "Sandy" Cameron; 3,688; 55.66%	Fenwick MacIntosh; 2,652; 40.02%	William Sugg; 286; 4.32%		A.M. "Sandy" Cameron
Pictou Centre	Lawrence MacKinnon; 4,954; 42.54%	Fraser MacLean; 5,100; 43.80%	Dave MacKenzie; 1,591; 13.66%		Ralph F. Fiske†
Pictou East	J. Lester MacLellan; 2,945; 42.09%	Donald Cameron; 3,217; 45.98%	Joanne E. Kohout; 835; 11.93%		A. Lloyd MacDonald†
Pictou West	Dan Reid; 2,624; 43.99%	Harvey Veniot; 2,602; 43.62%	Charles Parker; 739; 12.39%		Harvey Veniot

=== Cape Breton ===
Electoral district	Candidates				Incumbent
Electoral district	Liberal	PC	NDP	Independent	Incumbent
Cape Breton Centre	Albert J. Boudreau; 1,703; 21.76%	Mike Laffin; 2,743; 35.05%	Buddy MacEachern; 3,380; 43.19%		Mike Laffin
Cape Breton East	Vincent Kachafanas; 3,443; 30.83%	Frederick Adshade; 1,611; 14.43%	**Jeremy Akerman**; 5,929; 53.10%	Archie MacDonald; 183; 1.64%	Jeremy Akerman
Cape Breton North	Barry LeBlanc; 4,155; 33.57%	Tom MacKeough; 4,889; 39.50%	Len J. Arsenault; 3,333; 26.93%		Tom MacKeough
Cape Breton Nova	Ronald DiPenta; 1,275; 17.19%	Percy Gaum; 2,334; 31.46%	Paul MacEwan; 3,809; 51.35%		Paul MacEwan
Cape Breton South	Vince MacLean; 6,487; 50.87%	John Francis Burke; 3,721; 29.18%	Earl Johnston; 2,441; 19.14%	Angus Currie; 102; 0.80%	John Francis Burke
Cape Breton West	Allan Sullivan; 6,281; 53.46%	Kenneth Andrews; 3,199; 27.23%	Frank Boone; 2,269; 19.31%		Allan Sullivan
Inverness	William MacEachern; 5,606; 26.50%	Norman J. MacLean; 4,832; 22.84%	Donald MacKay; 621; 2.94%	Catherine M. Haig; 139; 0.66%	Norman J. MacLean
Inverness	John Archie MacKenzie; 5,403; 25.54%	Joseph Shannon; 4,088; 19.32%	Winston Bennett; 466; 2.20%		John Archie MacKenzie
Richmond	Gaston LeBlanc; 3,697; 57.62%	Joseph Stewart; 2,138; 33.32%	Stanley Pashkoski; 581; 9.06%		Gerald Doucet†
Victoria	Maynard MacAskill; 2,573; 59.44%	Fisher Hudson; 1,542; 35.62%	Colin A. Gillis; 214; 4.94%		Fisher Hudson
