= Frank Stanfield =

Canadian entrepreneur and politician (1872–1931)

The Honourable Frank Stanfield

15th Lieutenant Governor of Nova Scotia
- In office November 19, 1930 – September 25, 1931
- Monarch: George V
- Governors General: The Earl of Willingdon; The Earl of Bessborough
- Premier: Gordon Sidney Harrington
- Preceded by: James Cranswick Tory
- Succeeded by: Walter Harold Covert

MLA for Colchester County
- In office June 14, 1911 – July 27, 1920 Serving with Robert H. Kennedy
- Preceded by: William D. Hill; B.F. Pearson
- Succeeded by: Robert H. Smith; Harry L. Taggart
- In office June 25, 1925 – November 19, 1930 Serving with William B. Armstrong, William A. Flemming
- Preceded by: Robert H. Smith; Harry L. Taggart
- Succeeded by: George Y. Thomas

Personal details
- Born: April 24, 1872 Truro, Nova Scotia
- Died: September 25, 1931 (aged 59) Halifax, Nova Scotia
- Party: Conservative
- Spouse: Sarah Emma Stanfield (née Thomas) (m. 1901)
- Relations: John Stanfield (brother)
- Children: Robert Lorne Stanfield; Frank Thomas Stanfield
- Occupation: Entrepreneur; Businessman
- Profession: Politician

Frank Stanfield (April 24, 1872 – September 25, 1931) was an entrepreneur in Nova Scotia, Canada, who was the 15th Lieutenant Governor of Nova Scotia (1930–31) and represented Colchester County in the Nova Scotia House of Assembly (1911–20 and 1925–30). He was the father of the politicians Robert Lorne Stanfield and Frank Thomas Stanfield.

== Early life ==
He was born in Truro, Nova Scotia, the son of Charles E. Stanfield, who established the Stanfield Mills in Truro, and Lydia Dawson. In 1896, with his brother John Stanfield, he took over the operation of the business, which was incorporated as Stanfield's Limited in 1906. Its "unshrinkable" underwear, developed in 1898, became popular with gold prospectors in the Yukon. The company expanded to be one of the largest producers of woollen goods in Canada.

== Career ==
Stanfield represented Colchester County in the Nova Scotia House of Assembly from 1911 until 1920, serving with Robert H. Kennedy. He was re-elected five years later and sat as a Conservative member from 1925 until 1928. He was appointed as the 15th Lieutenant Governor of Nova Scotia in 1930 but died in office in Halifax the following year at the age of 59.

== Family ==
Stanfield married Sarah Emma Thomas in 1901. Their son Robert Lorne Stanfield became premier of Nova Scotia and served as leader of the federal Progressive Conservative Party. Another son Frank Thomas Stanfield also served in the House of Commons of Canada.
