= William A. Flemming =

Canadian politician

MLA for Colchester
- In office 1928–1937
- Preceded by: William Boardman Armstrong
- Succeeded by: Frederick Murray Blois

Personal details
- Born: September 4, 1897 Truro, Nova Scotia
- Died: June 19, 1976 (aged 78) Truro, Nova Scotia
- Party: Conservative
- Occupation: farmer, businessman

William Alexander Flemming (September 4, 1897 – June 19, 1976) was a Canadian politician. He represented the electoral district of Colchester in the Nova Scotia House of Assembly from 1928 to 1937. He was a member of the Conservative Party of Nova Scotia.

Born in 1897 at Truro, Nova Scotia, Flemming was educated at the Nova Scotia Agricultural College, and the Ontario Agricultural College. He married Helen Catherine Dunlop in 1919, and was a farmer and businessman by career. Flemming entered provincial politics in 1928, when he was elected in the dual-member Colchester riding with Conservative Frank Stanfield. In the 1933 election, he was re-elected with Conservative George Y. Thomas. Flemming did not reoffer in the 1937 election. He died at Truro on June 18, 1976.
