= Robert F. McLellan =

Canadian politician

MLA for Colchester
- In office 1945–1949
- Preceded by: Frederick Murray Blois; George Scott Dickey
- Succeeded by: Robert Stanfield; George Isaac Smith

Personal details
- Born: September 8, 1914 Truro, Nova Scotia
- Died: November 23, 1988 (aged 74)
- Party: Nova Scotia Liberal Party
- Occupation: lawyer

Robert Faulkner McLellan (September 8, 1914 – November 23, 1988) was a Canadian politician. He represented the electoral district of Colchester in the Nova Scotia House of Assembly between 1945 and 1949. He was a member of the Nova Scotia Liberal Party.

McLellan was born in 1914 at Truro, Nova Scotia. He was educated at Mount Allison University and Dalhousie Law School. He married Helen Gladys Stuart in 1941. McLellan first attempted to enter provincial politics in the 1941 election, but was defeated. He ran again in 1945, and was elected in the dual-member Colchester riding with Liberal Gordon Purdy. In the 1949 election, McLellan was defeated by Progressive Conservative leader Robert Stanfield and George Isaac Smith. McLellan ran as a Liberal candidate in the 1958 federal election, but was defeated by Progressive Conservative Cyril Kennedy in Colchester—Hants. On January 5, 1966, McLellan was appointed a County Court judge, and served in the position until September 30, 1981. McLellan died on November 23, 1988.
