= George Henry Wilson =

Canadian politician

George H. Wilson

MLA for Hants West
- In office 1950–1963
- Preceded by: George B. Cole
- Succeeded by: Norman T. Spence

Personal details
- Born: December 12, 1893 Upper Falmouth, Nova Scotia
- Died: October 17, 1988 (aged 94) Windsor, Nova Scotia
- Party: Progressive Conservative
- Occupation: businessman

George Henry Wilson (December 12, 1893 – October 17, 1988) was a Canadian politician. He represented the electoral district of Hants West in the Nova Scotia House of Assembly from 1950 to 1963. He was a member of the Progressive Conservative Party of Nova Scotia.

Born in 1893 at Upper Falmouth, Nova Scotia, Wilson was educated at the Maritime Business College. He married Mabel Dorothy Beckman in 1926, and then Marjorie Mason in 1961. A businessman by career, Wilson was the manager of Falmouth Fruit Co-operative Ltd., and president of Evangeline Broadcasting Corporation.

Wilson first attempted to enter provincial politics in 1949, finishing 3 votes ahead of Liberal George B. Cole on election night, but the Liberals asked for a recount. On June 18, a recount resulted in a tie between Wilson and Cole which was broken when the returning officer cast the deciding vote for Cole, declaring him elected by one vote. In January 1950, Wilson appealed the election result to the Nova Scotia Supreme Court, where under the Nova Scotia Controverted Elections Act, the returning officer's decision was ruled an undue return and the election voided. A byelection was held on November 27, 1950, resulting in Wilson defeating Liberal William C. Dunlop by 806 votes. Wilson was re-elected in the 1953, 1956, and 1960 elections. From 1957 to 1963, Wilson served as Deputy Speaker of the House of Assembly. He did not reoffer in the 1963 election. Wilson died in 1988 at Windsor, Nova Scotia.
