= Melinda MacLean =

Canadian politician

MLA for Colchester
- In office 1974–1978
- Preceded by: George Isaac Smith; Gerald Ritcey
- Succeeded by: riding dissolved

Personal details
- Born: January 19, 1946 (age 80) Truro, Nova Scotia
- Party: Nova Scotia Liberal Party
- Occupation: Lawyer

Melinda Jane MacLean (née McLellan; January 19, 1946) is a former Canadian politician. She represented the electoral district of Colchester in the Nova Scotia House of Assembly from 1974 to 1978. She was a member of the Nova Scotia Liberal Party.

MacLean was born in Truro, Nova Scotia, the daughter of former Colchester MLA Robert F. McLellan. She attended the University of New Brunswick and Dalhousie University, earning a Bachelor of Laws degree from the latter. In 1968, she married John Alton MacLean.
