= Hants West =

Provincial electoral district in Nova Scotia, Canada

Nova Scotia electoral district

Provincial electoral district
- Legislature: Nova Scotia House of Assembly
MLA
Melissa Sheehy-Richard
Progressive Conservative
- District created: 1949
- First contested: 1949
- Last contested: 2024

Demographics
- Population (2011): 19,058
- Electors: 15,352
- Area (km²): 1,319
- Pop. density (per km²): 14.4
- Census division: Hants County

Hants West is a provincial electoral district in Nova Scotia, Canada, that elects one member of the Nova Scotia House of Assembly.

The district has existed since 1949. Earlier, it and Hants East were together in Hants.

== Geography ==
Hants West has a 1,319 km^{2} (509 sq mi) landmass.

== Members of the Legislative Assembly ==
This riding has elected the following members of the Legislative Assembly:

Hants West
Legislature	Years	Member	Party
Riding created from Hants
44th	1949–1953	George B. Cole	Liberal
45th	1953–1956	George Henry Wilson	Progressive Conservative
46th	1956–1960	George Henry Wilson	Progressive Conservative
47th	1960–1963	George Henry Wilson	Progressive Conservative
48th	1963–1967	Norman T. Spence	Progressive Conservative
49th	1967–1970	Norman T. Spence	Progressive Conservative
50th	1970–1974	Robert D. Lindsay	Liberal
51st	1974–1978	Robert D. Lindsay	Liberal
52nd	1978–1981	Ron Russell	Progressive Conservative
53rd	1981–1984	Ron Russell	Progressive Conservative
54th	1984–1988	Ron Russell	Progressive Conservative
55th	1988–1993	Ron Russell	Progressive Conservative
56th	1993–1998	Ron Russell	Progressive Conservative
57th	1998–1999	Ron Russell	Progressive Conservative
58th	1999–2003	Ron Russell	Progressive Conservative
59th	2003–2006	Ron Russell	Progressive Conservative
60th	2006–2009	Chuck Porter	Progressive Conservative
61st	2009–2013	Chuck Porter	Progressive Conservative
62nd	2013–2014	Chuck Porter	Progressive Conservative
62nd	2014–2016	Chuck Porter	Independent
62nd	2016–2017	Chuck Porter	Liberal
63rd	2017–2021	Chuck Porter	Liberal
64th	2021–2024	Melissa Sheehy-Richard	Progressive Conservative
65th	2024–present	Melissa Sheehy-Richard	Progressive Conservative

== Election results ==
=== 2024 ===
2024 Nova Scotia general election
Party	Candidate	Votes	%	±%
Progressive Conservative	Melissa Sheehy-Richard	4,253	52.59	+9.48
Liberal	Brian Casey	2,621	32.41	-9.17
New Democratic	Simon Greenough	1,120	13.85	+2.82
Independent	James Omand	93	1.15	–
Total valid votes		8,087	–	
Total rejected ballots		43		
Turnout		8,130	45.91	
Eligible voters		17,707		
Progressive Conservative hold		Swing		
Source: Elections Nova Scotia

=== 2021 ===
2021 Nova Scotia general election
Party	Candidate	Votes	%	±%	Expenditures
Progressive Conservative	Melissa Sheehy-Richard	3,968	43.11	+14.18	$40,454.11
Liberal	Brian Casey	3,827	41.58	-13.16	$40,039.34
New Democratic	Caet Moir	1,015	11.03	-1.42	$31,621.71
Green	Jenn Kang	273	2.97	-0.07	$200.00
Atlantica	Gordon J. Berry	121	1.31	+0.47	$200.00
Total valid votes/expense limit		9,204	99.73	–	$94,843.34
Total rejected ballots		25	0.27		
Turnout		9,229	55.98		
Eligible voters		16,485			
Progressive Conservative gain from Liberal		Swing		+13.67	
Source: Elections Nova Scotia

=== 2017 ===
2017 provincial election redistributed results
Party	Vote	%
Liberal	4,708	54.74
Progressive Conservative	2,488	28.93
New Democratic	1,071	12.45
Green	261	3.03
Atlantica	73	0.85

2017 Nova Scotia general election
Party	Candidate	Votes	%	±%
Liberal	Chuck Porter	4,589	54.87	+17.63
Progressive Conservative	Janice Munroe Dodge	2,416	28.89	-21.86
New Democratic	Lalia Kerr	1,042	12.46	+10.54
Green	Torin Buzek	243	2.90	
Atlantica	Edward Boucher	73	0.87	
Total valid votes		8,363	100	
Total rejected ballots		37	0.44	
Turnout		8,400	54.72	
Eligible voters		15,352		
Liberal gain		Swing		+19.75
Source: Elections Nova Scotia

=== 2013 ===
2013 Nova Scotia general election
Party	Candidate	Votes	%	±%
Progressive Conservative	Chuck Porter	4,468	50.75	13.51
Liberal	Claude O'Hara	3,279	37.24	3.32
New Democratic	Brian D. Stephens	888	10.09	-16.49
Green	Torin Buzek	169	1.92	-0.34
Total		8,804	–	
Source(s) Source: Nova Scotia Legislature (2024). "Electoral History for Hants West" (PDF). nslegislature.ca. Nova Scotia, Chief Electoral Officer (2013). 39th Provincial General Election, October 8, 2013: Volume 1 – Statement of Votes & Statistics (PDF) (Report). Elections Nova Scotia. Archived from the original (PDF) on 10 April 2018.

=== 2009 ===
2009 Nova Scotia general election
Party	Candidate	Votes	%	±%
Progressive Conservative	Chuck Porter	3,364	37.24	2.60
Liberal	Paula Lunn	3,065	33.93	-0.09
New Democratic	Barbara Gallagher	2,401	26.58	-2.37
Green	Sheila G. Richardson	204	2.26	-0.14
Total		9,034	–	
Source(s) Source: Nova Scotia Legislature (2024). "Electoral History for Hants West" (PDF). nslegislature.ca.

=== 2006 ===
2006 Nova Scotia general election
Party	Candidate	Votes	%	±%
Progressive Conservative	Chuck Porter	2,974	34.63	-11.52
Liberal	Paula Lunn	2,921	34.02	8.77
New Democratic	Sean Bennett	2,486	28.95	2.72
Green	Sam Schurman	206	2.40	–
Total		8,587	–	
Source(s) Source: Nova Scotia Legislature (2024). "Electoral History for Hants West" (PDF). nslegislature.ca.

=== 2003 ===
2003 Nova Scotia general election
Party	Candidate	Votes	%	±%
Progressive Conservative	Ron Russell	3,871	46.15	-12.12
New Democratic	Sean Bennett	2,200	26.23	6.75
Liberal	Randy Matheson	2,118	25.25	3.00
Marijuana	Chummy Anthony	148	1.76	–
Nova Scotia Party	Connie Brauer	51	0.61	–
Total		8,388	–	
Source(s) Source: Nova Scotia Legislature (2024). "Electoral History for Hants West" (PDF). nslegislature.ca.

=== 1999 ===
1999 Nova Scotia general election
Party	Candidate	Votes	%	±%
Progressive Conservative	Ron Russell	5,276	58.27	10.79
Liberal	Joe Robertson	2,015	22.25	-5.09
New Democratic	Dick Terfry	1,764	19.48	-5.70
Total		9,055	–	
Source(s) Source: Nova Scotia Legislature (2024). "Electoral History for Hants West" (PDF). nslegislature.ca. Nova Scotia, Chief Electoral Officer (1999). Returns of the General Election for the House of Assembly, Thirty-Fifth General Election (Report). Elections Nova Scotia.

=== 1998 ===
1998 Nova Scotia general election
Party	Candidate	Votes	%	±%
Progressive Conservative	Ron Russell	4,507	47.48	7.07
Liberal	Debbi Bowes	2,596	27.35	-12.61
New Democratic	Dana Harvey	2,390	25.18	6.87
Total		9,493	–	
Source(s) Source: Nova Scotia Legislature (2024). "Electoral History for Hants West" (PDF). nslegislature.ca.

=== 1993 ===
1993 Nova Scotia general election
Party	Candidate	Votes	%	±%
Progressive Conservative	Ron Russell	4,152	40.41	-12.43
Liberal	Mike Doyle	4,106	39.96	10.60
New Democratic	Dana Harvey	1,881	18.31	0.51
Independent	Donald L. McKay	136	1.32	–
Total		10,275	–	
Source(s) Source: Nova Scotia Legislature (2024). "Electoral History for Hants West" (PDF). nslegislature.ca. Nova Scotia, Chief Electoral Officer (1993). Returns of the General Election for the House of Assembly, Thirty-Third General Election (PDF) (Report). Queen's Printer. Archived from the original (PDF) on 18 June 2018.

=== 1988 ===
1988 Nova Scotia general election
Party	Candidate	Votes	%	±%
Progressive Conservative	Ron Russell	5,091	52.84	-2.81
Liberal	Donzell A. Ross	2,829	29.36	-1.08
New Democratic	Penny Reid	1,715	17.80	3.89
Total		9,635	–	
Source(s) Source: Nova Scotia Legislature (2024). "Electoral History for Hants West" (PDF). nslegislature.ca. Nova Scotia, Chief Electoral Officer (1988). Returns of the General Election for the House of Assembly, Thirty-Second General Election (PDF) (Report). Queen's Printer. Archived from the original (PDF) on 7 July 2018.

=== 1984 ===
1984 Nova Scotia general election
Party	Candidate	Votes	%	±%
Progressive Conservative	Ron Russell	4,634	55.65	4.14
Liberal	Dewer Lindsay	2,535	30.44	0.34
New Democratic	Alan St. C. Squires	1,158	13.91	-4.49
Total		8,327	–	
Source(s) Source: Nova Scotia Legislature (2024). "Electoral History for Hants West" (PDF). nslegislature.ca. Nova Scotia, Chief Electoral Officer (1984). Returns of the General Election for the House of Assembly, Thirty-First General Election (PDF) (Report). Queen's Printer. Archived from the original (PDF) on 31 July 2017.

=== 1981 ===
1981 Nova Scotia general election
Party	Candidate	Votes	%	±%
Progressive Conservative	Ron Russell	4,554	51.51	-1.72
Liberal	Daniel J. McGrath	2,661	30.10	-7.98
New Democratic	Alan St. C. Squires	1,626	18.39	9.70
Total		8,841	–	
Source(s) Source: Nova Scotia Legislature (2024). "Electoral History for Hants West" (PDF). nslegislature.ca. Nova Scotia, Chief Electoral Officer (1981). Returns of the General Election for the House of Assembly, Thirtieth General Election (PDF) (Report). Queen's Printer. Archived from the original (PDF) on 31 July 2017.

=== 1978 ===
1978 Nova Scotia general election
Party	Candidate	Votes	%	±%
Progressive Conservative	Ron Russell	4,872	53.23	10.27
Liberal	Robert D. Lindsay	3,485	38.08	-9.99
New Democratic	Bill Shiers	795	8.69	-0.28
Total		9,152	–	
Source(s) Source: Nova Scotia Legislature (2024). "Electoral History for Hants West" (PDF). nslegislature.ca. Nova Scotia, Chief Electoral Officer (1978). Returns of the General Election for the House of Assembly, Twenty-Ninth General Election (PDF) (Report). Queen's Printer. Archived from the original (PDF) on 18 June 2018.

=== 1974 ===
1974 Nova Scotia general election
Party	Candidate	Votes	%	±%
Liberal	Robert D. Lindsay	4,148	48.07	-3.66
Progressive Conservative	Ron Russell	3,707	42.96	-5.31
New Democratic	Gary E. Tonks	774	8.97	–
Total		8,629	–	
Source(s) Source: Nova Scotia Legislature (2024). "Electoral History for Hants West" (PDF). nslegislature.ca. Nova Scotia, Chief Electoral Officer (1974). Returns of the General Election for the House of Assembly, Twenty-Eighth General Election (PDF) (Report). Queen's Printer. Archived from the original (PDF) on 18 June 2018.

=== 1970 ===
1970 Nova Scotia general election
Party	Candidate	Votes	%	±%
Liberal	Robert D. Lindsay	3,974	51.73	3.69
Progressive Conservative	Norman T. Spence	3,708	48.27	-3.69
Total		7,682	–	
Source(s) Source: Nova Scotia Legislature (2024). "Electoral History for Hants West" (PDF). nslegislature.ca. Nova Scotia, Legislative Assembly (1970). Returns of the General Election for the House of Assembly, 1970 (PDF) (Report). Queen's Printer. Archived from the original (PDF) on 25 July 2018.

=== 1967 ===
1967 Nova Scotia general election
Party	Candidate	Votes	%	±%
Progressive Conservative	Norman T. Spence	3,765	51.96	-6.24
Liberal	Robert D. Lindsay	3,481	48.04	8.62
Total		7,246	–	
Source(s) Source: Nova Scotia Legislature (2024). "Electoral History for Hants West" (PDF). nslegislature.ca. Nova Scotia Legislature (1967). Returns of the General Election for the House of Assembly (PDF) (Report). Queen's Printer. Archived from the original (PDF) on 25 July 2018.

=== 1963 ===
1963 Nova Scotia general election
Party	Candidate	Votes	%	±%
Progressive Conservative	Norman T. Spence	4,193	58.20	8.94
Liberal	W. Whitney Spicer	2,840	39.42	-6.97
New Democratic	Arthur William Benedict	171	2.37	-1.97
Total		7,204	–	
Source(s) Source: Nova Scotia Legislature (2024). "Electoral History for Hants West" (PDF). nslegislature.ca. Nova Scotia Legislature (1963). Returns of the General Election for the House of Assembly (PDF) (Report). Queen's Printer. Archived from the original (PDF) on 25 July 2018.

=== 1960 ===
1960 Nova Scotia general election
Party	Candidate	Votes	%	±%
Progressive Conservative	George Henry Wilson	3,623	49.27	0.05
Liberal	Gerald Regan	3,412	46.40	-1.30
Co-operative Commonwealth	Howard B. Wile	319	4.34	1.24
Total		7,354	–	
Source(s) Source: Nova Scotia Legislature (2024). "Electoral History for Hants West" (PDF). nslegislature.ca. Nova Scotia Legislature (1960). Returns of the General Election for the House of Assembly (PDF) (Report). Queen's Printer. Archived from the original (PDF) on 25 July 2018.

=== 1956 ===
1956 Nova Scotia general election
Party	Candidate	Votes	%	±%
Progressive Conservative	George Henry Wilson	3,405	49.21	-4.41
Liberal	Gerald Regan	3,300	47.69	1.32
Co-operative Commonwealth	Ralph Loomer	214	3.09	–
Total		6,919	–	
Source(s) Source: Nova Scotia Legislature (2024). "Electoral History for Hants West" (PDF). nslegislature.ca. Nova Scotia Legislature (1956). Returns of the General Election for the House of Assembly (PDF) (Report). Queen's Printer. Archived from the original (PDF) on 10 September 2018.

=== 1953 ===
1953 Nova Scotia general election
Party	Candidate	Votes	%	±%
Progressive Conservative	George Henry Wilson	3,608	53.63	-2.49
Liberal	Ken Eisner	3,120	46.37	2.49
Total		6,728	–	
Source(s) Source: Nova Scotia Legislature (2024). "Electoral History for Hants West" (PDF). nslegislature.ca. Nova Scotia Legislature (1953). Returns of the General Election for the House of Assembly (PDF) (Report). Queen's Printer. Archived from the original (PDF) on 10 September 2018.

=== 1950 by-election ===
Nova Scotia provincial by-election, 1950-11-27
Party	Candidate	Votes	%	±%
Progressive Conservative	George Henry Wilson	3,698	56.12	27.68
Liberal	William C. Dunlop	2,892	43.88	-3.17
Total		6,590	–	
Source(s) Source: Nova Scotia Legislature (2024). "Electoral History for Hants West" (PDF). nslegislature.ca.

=== 1949 ===
1949 Nova Scotia general election
Party	Candidate	Votes	%	±%
Liberal	George B. Cole	2,530	47.05	–
Progressive Conservative	George Henry Wilson	1,529	28.44	–
Independent	Gordon B. Crossley	749	13.93	–
Co-operative Commonwealth	Ralph Loomer	569	10.58	–
Total		5,377	–	
Source(s) Source: Nova Scotia Legislature (2024). "Electoral History for Hants West" (PDF). nslegislature.ca. Nova Scotia Legislature (1949). Returns of the General Election for the House of Assembly (PDF) (Report). Queen's Printer. Archived from the original (PDF) on 10 September 2018.

== See also ==
- List of Nova Scotia provincial electoral districts
- Canadian provincial electoral districts
