= George Y. Thomas =

Canadian politician

MLA for Colchester County
- In office 1933–1940
- Preceded by: Frank Stanfield
- Succeeded by: George Scott Dickey

Personal details
- Born: September 9, 1882 Truro, Nova Scotia
- Died: May 11, 1940 (aged 57) Truro, Nova Scotia
- Party: Conservative
- Occupation: merchant

George Yuill Thomas (September 9, 1882 – May 11, 1940) was a merchant and political figure in Nova Scotia, Canada. He represented Colchester in the Nova Scotia House of Assembly from 1933 to 1940 as a Conservative member.

Thomas was born in Truro, Nova Scotia, the son of David John Thomas, who was once mayor of Truro and who immigrated from Wales, and Rowena Crowe. In 1909, he married Mildred Ethel Norris. He served as mayor of Truro from 1930 to 1936. He sold books, stationery and office supplies. Thomas was president of the Truro Board of Trade and the Truro Golf Club. He died in office at Truro at the age of 57.
