= Robert Stanfield =

Canadian premier and opposition leader (1914–2003)

The Right Honourable Robert Stanfield PC QC FRCGS
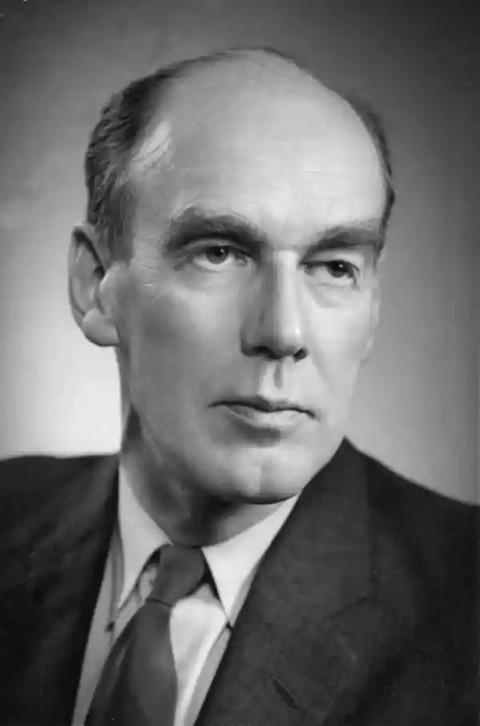
- Stanfield in 1967

17th Premier of Nova Scotia
- In office November 20, 1956 – September 13, 1967
- Monarch: Elizabeth II
- Lieutenant Governor: Alistair Fraser; Edward Chester Plow; Henry Poole MacKeen
- Preceded by: Henry Hicks
- Succeeded by: G. I. Smith

Leader of the Opposition
- In office November 9, 1967 – February 21, 1976
- Preceded by: Michael Starr
- Succeeded by: Joe Clark

Leader of the Progressive Conservative Party of Canada
- In office September 9, 1967 – February 21, 1976
- Preceded by: John Diefenbaker
- Succeeded by: Joe Clark

Member of Parliament for Halifax
- In office June 25, 1968 – May 21, 1979
- Preceded by: Riding created
- Succeeded by: George Cooper

Member of Parliament for Colchester—Hants
- In office November 6, 1967 – June 24, 1968
- Preceded by: Cyril Kennedy
- Succeeded by: Riding abolished

Member of the Nova Scotia House of Assembly for Colchester
- In office June 9, 1949 – September 13, 1967 Serving with G. I. Smith
- Preceded by: Gordon Purdy; Robert F. McLellan
- Succeeded by: Gerald Ritcey

Personal details
- Born: Robert Lorne Stanfield; April 11, 1914 Truro, Nova Scotia, Canada
- Died: December 16, 2003 (aged 89) Ottawa, Ontario, Canada
- Resting place: Camp Hill Cemetery; Halifax, Nova Scotia, Canada
- Party: Progressive Conservative
- Spouses: Joyce Frazee (m. 1940; died 1954); Mary Hall (m. 1957; died 1977); Anne Austin (m. 1978)
- Children: 4
- Relatives: Frank Stanfield (father); John Stanfield (uncle); Frank Thomas Stanfield (brother)
- Education: Dalhousie University (BA); Harvard University (LLB)
- Profession: Barrister; Ambassador

Robert Lorne Stanfield PC QC FRCGS (April 11, 1914 – December 16, 2003) was a Canadian politician who served as the 17th premier of Nova Scotia from 1956 to 1967 and the leader of the Official Opposition and leader of the Progressive Conservative Party of Canada from 1967 to 1976.

Born into an affluent Nova Scotia clothing manufacturing and political family in Truro, Stanfield graduated from Dalhousie University and Harvard Law School in the 1930s. He was a lawyer before becoming the leader of the Nova Scotia Progressive Conservative Party in 1948, with the goal of reviving the party that did not have a single seat in the legislature. After a rebuilding period, Stanfield led the party to a majority government in 1956; their first victory since 1928. Leading the party to four majorities in total, Stanfield's government established Industrial Estates Limited (IEL) to attract new industry in Nova Scotia, introduced hospital insurance and a provincial sales tax (PST) to fund half of it, prioritized human rights for Black Nova Scotians, and drastically increased funding for education.

In 1967, he resigned as premier and was elected the leader of the federal Progressive Conservative (PC) Party, thus becoming the leader of the Official Opposition. In the 1968 federal election, he suffered a landslide defeat to the incumbent Liberals led by Prime Minister Pierre Trudeau. In 1972, Stanfield recovered the PCs' standing and narrowly lost to Trudeau for a second time. In 1974, he lost to Trudeau's Liberals for a third time by a wide margin. Stanfield was a strong supporter of bilingualism, putting him at odds with some members of the PC Party. He resigned as leader in 1976 and from politics in 1979.

In retirement, he lived mostly in Ottawa, and campaigned for the Meech Lake Accord, the Charlottetown Accord, and free trade in the 1980s and early 1990s. He died in Ottawa in 2003 from complications due to pneumonia. He was one of only several people granted the style "The Right Honourable" who were not so entitled by virtue of an office held.

== Early life (1913–1947) ==
Stanfield was born in Truro, Nova Scotia, the son of Sarah Emma (née Thomas) and entrepreneur Frank Stanfield, and was named after Robert Borden, a fellow Nova Scotian who was prime minister at the time. Stanfield's family owned Stanfield's Limited, a large textile company. Stanfield studied economics and political science at Dalhousie University and was awarded the Governor General's Silver Medal for achieving the highest standing when he graduated in 1936 with a Bachelor of Arts (BA) degree.

Stanfield then studied at Harvard Law School, where he was an honours student near the top of his class and the first Canadian editor of the Harvard Law Review. During his student days in the 1930s, he witnessed the poverty that the Great Depression produced, causing him to become interested in John Maynard Keynes's economic theories. Stanfield then considered himself a socialist. Over time, he was less attached to socialism, but its influence on him remained, as he was considered a Red Tory for his appreciation of the common good. Stanfield graduated from Harvard in 1939 and was called to the bar of Nova Scotia in 1940, practicing law in Truro at the firm that would become Patterson Law. From 1939 to 1945 during World War II, he worked as a member of the Wartime Prices and Trade Board's Halifax staff.

== Provincial politics (1947–1967) ==
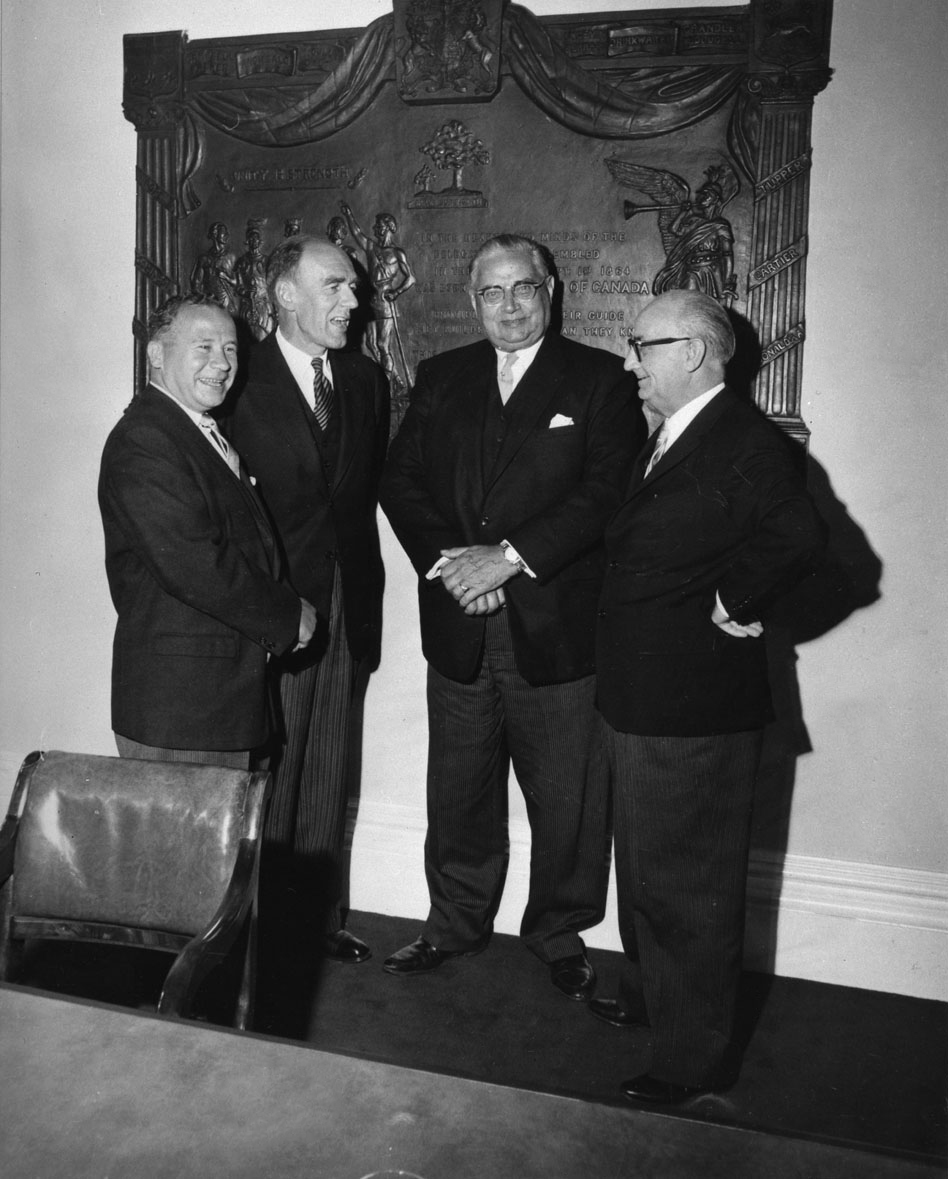
Stanfield (second to the left) and three other Atlantic Premiers in Confederation Chamber, Charlottetown, P.E.I., 1964

Stanfield decided to enter Nova Scotia politics. In 1947 he became president of the Progressive Conservative Association of Nova Scotia (PCs) which was in poor shape as it did not have a single seat in the legislature, while the Liberals dominated the province. In 1948, Stanfield was elected leader of the party, and began the process of reviving the party. In the 1949 election, the PCs won 8 seats and in 1953, they won 12. In the 1956 election, the PCs won a majority government, their first victory since 1928. This ended 23 consecutive years of Liberal rule.

=== Premier of Nova Scotia (1956–1967) ===
Known as "Honest Bob" for his straightforward manner, Stanfield served as premier of Nova Scotia, governing as a moderate and pragmatist. He led reforms on education, human rights, and health care. He led the PCs to three re-elections in 1960, 1963, and 1967, each time with larger majorities.

==== Economic policy ====
In 1957, Stanfield's government established the crown corporation Industrial Estates Limited (IEL) to attract new industry in Nova Scotia. By the time Stanfield left office in 1967, the IEL had invested $74 million into 25 new firms and created nearly 2,300 jobs in the province.

In 1963, Stanfield's government established the Nova Scotia Voluntary Planning Board to assist the minister of finance in creating measures to increase the rate of economic growth through voluntary economic planning.

Stanfield's government raised the limit on agricultural loans from $8,000 to $100,000. To aid livestock farmers in building a million dollar slaughterhouse, his government contributed three dollars for every dollar the farmers raised. His government also created a provincial parks system.

Stanfield's government introduced hospital insurance, as well as a provincial sales tax (also known as the Hospital Tax) to fund half of it (with the other half being funded by the federal government). The PST, which became effective on January 1, 1959, was initially 5 percent but was later raised to 7 percent. The PST applied to all goods and services except food and children's clothing.

Stanfield strongly opposed the Bell Telephone Company's takeover bid of Nova Scotia's Maritime Telegraph and Telephone Company (M.T. & T.) in 1966, arguing that a takeover would lead to sharp increases in the cost of the service. After the Bell declined to negotiate with his government within a five-day time frame, Stanfield called a special session in the legislature; during the session, the legislature passed a bill that prevented the Bell from taking control of M.T. & T., allowing the latter to remain in Nova Scotian control.

==== Human rights ====
Stanfield prioritized human rights, particularly for Black Nova Scotians. In 1959, Stanfield's government passed the Fair Accommodation Practices Act to protect against discrimination in public spaces. In 1962, Stanfield created and led the Interdepartmental Committee on Human Rights to support the work of William Oliver and other Black Nova Scotians. The year later, Stanfield's government codified and extended earlier legislation in the first Human Rights Act of 1963. In 1965, the Stanfield government established the Education fund for Negros and in 1967, created the Nova Scotia Human Rights Commission with Oliver.

==== Education policy ====
Stanfield's government increased funding for schools and training colleges. His government started to contribute funding towards universities beginning in 1960; between 1960 and 1967, the Stanfield government's contributions towards universities jumped from $250,000 to $25,000,000. His government also introduced a capital assistance program in which the government would fund up to 90 percent of the cost of university buildings. In addition, Stanfield's government improved French-language education in Nova Scotia by introducing French textbooks (previously, Nova Scotia schools only offered English textbooks) and expanding French-language education to Grade 12 (up from Grade 8).

== Leader of the Official Opposition (1967–1976) ==
=== 1967 Progressive Conservative leadership convention ===
Stanfield did not express interest in entering federal politics during the early and mid-1960s. He turned down the federal Progressive Conservative Party (PC Party) leader and then-prime minister John Diefenbaker's proposal that he should enter federal politics in the 1962 federal election, and did not express interest in becoming party leader (when the idea was suggested by former PC minister Alvin Hamilton) following the Diefenbaker-led PCs' second defeat in the 1965 federal election.

In the mid-1960s, the federal Progressive Conservative Party was racked by disunity between supporters and opponents of Diefenbaker. A vocal opponent of Diefenbaker was party president Dalton Camp, who forced a leadership convention for 1967. Camp was a strong proponent of a potential Stanfield leadership bid. After months of hesitating, Stanfield finally bowed to Camp's pressure and on July 17, 1967, announced his intention to run for leader, on the condition that his finance minister George Isaac Smith agrees to succeed him as premier. Stanfield had strong delegate support in the Atlantic provinces but struggled in the Prairies and Quebec. Nonetheless, on the convention that was held on September 9, he led on the first four ballots, and won on the fifth ballot, taking 54.3 percent of the delegate vote. Stanfield resigned as premier on September 13.

=== Early months ===
Stanfield was elected to the House of Commons in a by-election for the riding of Colchester—Hants on November 6, 1967. He brought the Progressive Conservatives high in the polls, prompting many to expect him to defeat the Liberal government of the aging Lester B. Pearson. In February 1968, Stanfield almost forced an election after defeating Pearson's government on a tax bill, leading to several days of confusion over whether or not this counted as a de facto motion of no confidence in the government. Ultimately, it was ruled by the Governor General, Roland Michener that it did not, and while Stanfield immediately called an explicit motion of no confidence in Pearson's government, it failed to pass after the New Democratic Party and Ralliement créditiste declined to support it.

=== 1968 federal election ===
Pearson would soon retire, prompting the Liberals to choose Justice Minister and Attorney General Pierre Trudeau as its new leader in April 1968. Trudeau subsequently called an election for June 25. Trudeau was a charismatic intellectual and perfectly bilingual. Stanfield's unilingualism and uninspiring speaking style (according to Stanfield biographer Geoffrey Stevens) contrasted poorly with the new Liberal leader. The PCs started the election campaign with an internal poll showing them trailing the Liberals by 22 points.

Stanfield proposed introducing guaranteed annual income, though failed to explain the number of citizens that would be covered, the minimum income level, and the cost to implement it. Due to concerns that the term "guaranteed annual income" sounded socialist, he eventually switched to using the term "negative income tax". These mistakes made the policy impossible for voters to understand and harmed the PCs. What also damaged the PCs was the idea of deux nations (meaning that Canada was one country housing two nations - French Canadians and English-speaking Canadians). Marcel Faribault, the PCs' Quebec lieutenant and MP candidate, was unclear on whether he supported or opposed deux nations and Stanfield did not drop him as a candidate. This led to the Liberals positioning themselves as the party that supported one Canada. In mid-June, they ran a full-page newspaper advertisement that implied that Stanfield supported deux nations; Stanfield called the ad "a deliberate lie" and insisted he supported one Canada.

On election night, the Liberals increased their support to form a strong majority government. Though the PCs' popular vote share slightly dropped from 32.4 percent in 1965 to 31.4 percent, their seat count considerably reduced from 94 to 72. The PCs dominated Atlantic Canada but saw a significant decline in popularity in Ontario (as the party's performance in that province was the worst in their history), Quebec, Manitoba, and Saskatchewan.

=== 1968–1972 ===
After losing the 1968 election, Stanfield vacationed in Quebec where he participated in French immersion classes. He vigorously backed official bilingualism and the Liberals' 1969 Official Languages Act which made French an official language in Canada, arguing the act would strengthen Canadian unity. To his disappointment, 17 out of 72 PC MPs (including his predecessor as leader, John Diefenbaker), voted against the bill.

In 1969, Stanfield was one of 12 out of 72 PC MPs to vote in favour of the Trudeau government's Bill C-150, which decriminalized homosexuality and allowed abortion under certain conditions.

Stanfield initially supported the Trudeau government's October 1970 invocation of the War Measures Act to deal with the October Crisis but later regretted doing so.

=== 1972 federal election ===
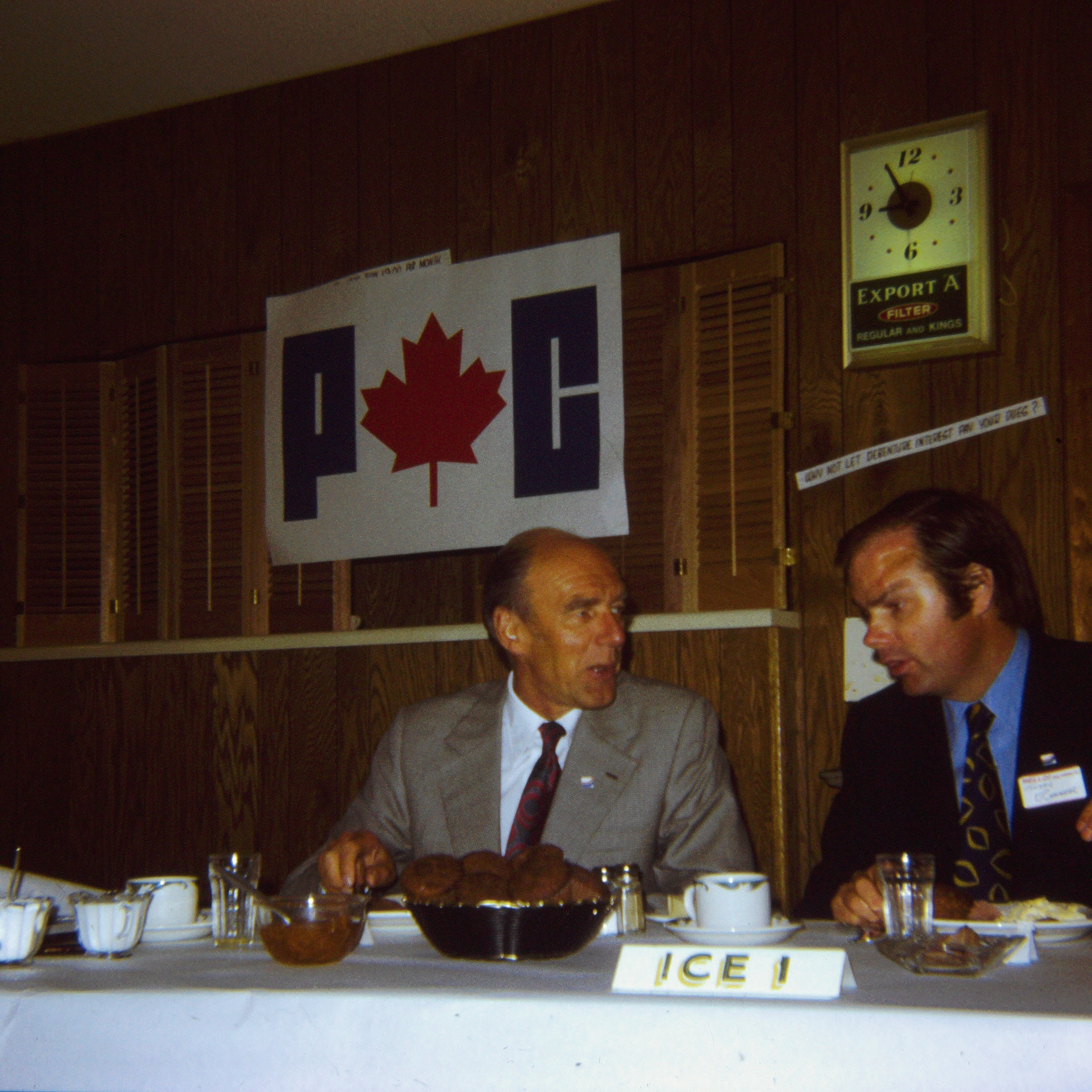
Stanfield and PC candidate Terry O'Connor at a community breakfast in Acton, Ontario in August 1972

In the election of 1972, Stanfield's Tories campaigned on the public's perception that the Liberals were mismanaging the economy as a result of rising unemployment. Though the Liberals started with a 10-point lead over the Progressive Conservatives, the election, held on October 30, saw the PCs win 107 seats and come two seats behind the Liberals who won 109 seats; this was one of the closest elections in Canadian history. The Liberals were able to form a minority government due to them getting support from the New Democratic Party led by David Lewis. In the election, Stanfield refused to sign the nomination papers of former Moncton mayor Leonard Jones; Jones had won the party nomination but he refused to support official bilingualism which was part of PC policy.

=== 1974 federal election ===
In May 1974, the House of Commons passed a motion of no confidence in the Trudeau government, defeating its budget bill after Trudeau intentionally antagonized Stanfield and Lewis. This triggered an election for July 8. The election focused mainly on the current economic recession, and Stanfield proposed to immediately introduce 90-day wage and price controls to help reduce the increasing inflation of the era. Trudeau mocked the proposal, saying to a newspaper reporter that it was the equivalent of a magician saying "Zap! You're frozen", and instead promoted a variety of small tax cuts to curb inflation. According to Trudeau’s biographer John English, NDP supporters scared of wage controls moved toward the Liberals during the campaign. Trudeau, in an abrupt reversal, would implement wage and price controls in December 1975 through the passing of the Anti-Inflation Act.

During the campaign, on May 30, 1974, a photo by photojournalist Doug Ball showing Stanfield fumbling a football thrown by Geoffrey Stevens at a stopover in North Bay, Ontario, became one of the defining images of his career. To this day, Canadian political commentators still point to this incident as one of Canada's foremost examples of "image politics", because the photo was chosen for the front pages of newspapers across Canada even though many other photos of Stanfield catching the same football were also available.

The election result showed the Liberals had boosted their support from a minority to a majority government, while the Progressive Conservatives' seat count dropped from 106 to 95. The Progressive Conservatives did well in the Atlantic provinces, and in the West, but strong Liberal support in Ontario and Quebec ensured a Liberal majority government.

=== Political ideology ===
Political science professor Ron Dart described Stanfield's political philosophy in the 1968 election as a "sort of Pink Toryism". Historian J. Murray Beck wrote about Stanfield, "Eschewing highly doctrinaire politics, his conservatism, which caused him to be called a "pink" if not a Red Tory, was above all a compassionate conservatism with a genuine concern for the disadvantaged." In a 1976 interview with Maclean's, Stanfield stated, "Increasing the size of the GNP is important, but it is not in itself a sufficient goal for a civilized society."

=== Retirement ===
On August 14, 1974, over a month after the election, Stanfield announced his intention to resign as party leader. During the news conference, he stated his preference for a French Canadian successor as leader. He served as leader of the PCs and leader of the Opposition until February 22, 1976, when he was permanently succeeded as leader by Joe Clark. Stanfield retired from Parliament in the May 1979 election which finally brought the Progressive Conservatives to power (though they would lose the February 1980 election to the Trudeau-led Liberals who won a majority).

== Later years (1976–2003) ==
After his retirement, Stanfield stayed out of politics until the constitutional debates, when he endorsed and campaigned for the Meech Lake Accord, the Charlottetown Accord, and free trade. He said that the Meech Lake Accord was a second chance to save Canada from disaster. "I'm not at all sure that I would want to live in a country that rejected Meech Lake," he said at the time. "It wouldn't be the Canada I grew up in. It wouldn't be the country with the values that I've loved during my life." Prime Minister Brian Mulroney wanted to appoint Stanfield as U.N. ambassador saying, "I tried to engage him further but he was leading a vigorous life and a very active life and he didn't want to change after a while."

From 1983 to 1987, Stanfield served as chairman of the Institute for Research on Public Policy. He also served as the first Canadian chairman of the Commonwealth Foundation from December 1986 to 1991.

=== Illness and death ===
In 1996, Stanfield suffered a debilitating stroke that left him severely disabled. He died on December 16, 2003, at Montfort Hospital in Ottawa, from pneumonia, only nine days after the Progressive Conservative Party merged with the Canadian Alliance to form the new Conservative Party of Canada. Fellow Nova Scotian — and final PC Party Leader — Peter MacKay suggested in an interview on CBC Newsworld's December 17, 2003 Morning Show that he had not personally spoken to Stanfield in regard to his opinions on the merger. It is unknown what Stanfield thought of the creation of the new Conservatives. His funeral service was held in Ottawa, and then he was buried in Camp Hill Cemetery, Halifax, Nova Scotia, next to his first wife Joyce Frazee, mother of his four children: Sarah, Max, Judith and Miriam, and with his second wife Mary Hall.

== Personal life ==
Stanfield married Joyce Frazee in 1940, but she died in a car accident in 1954. During his term as premier, Stanfield remarried, exchanging vows with Mary Hall in 1957. Mary Stanfield died of cancer in 1977, and the following year, Stanfield married his third wife, Anne Austin. Anne Austin Stanfield died, age 89, April 22, 2021.

== Honours ==
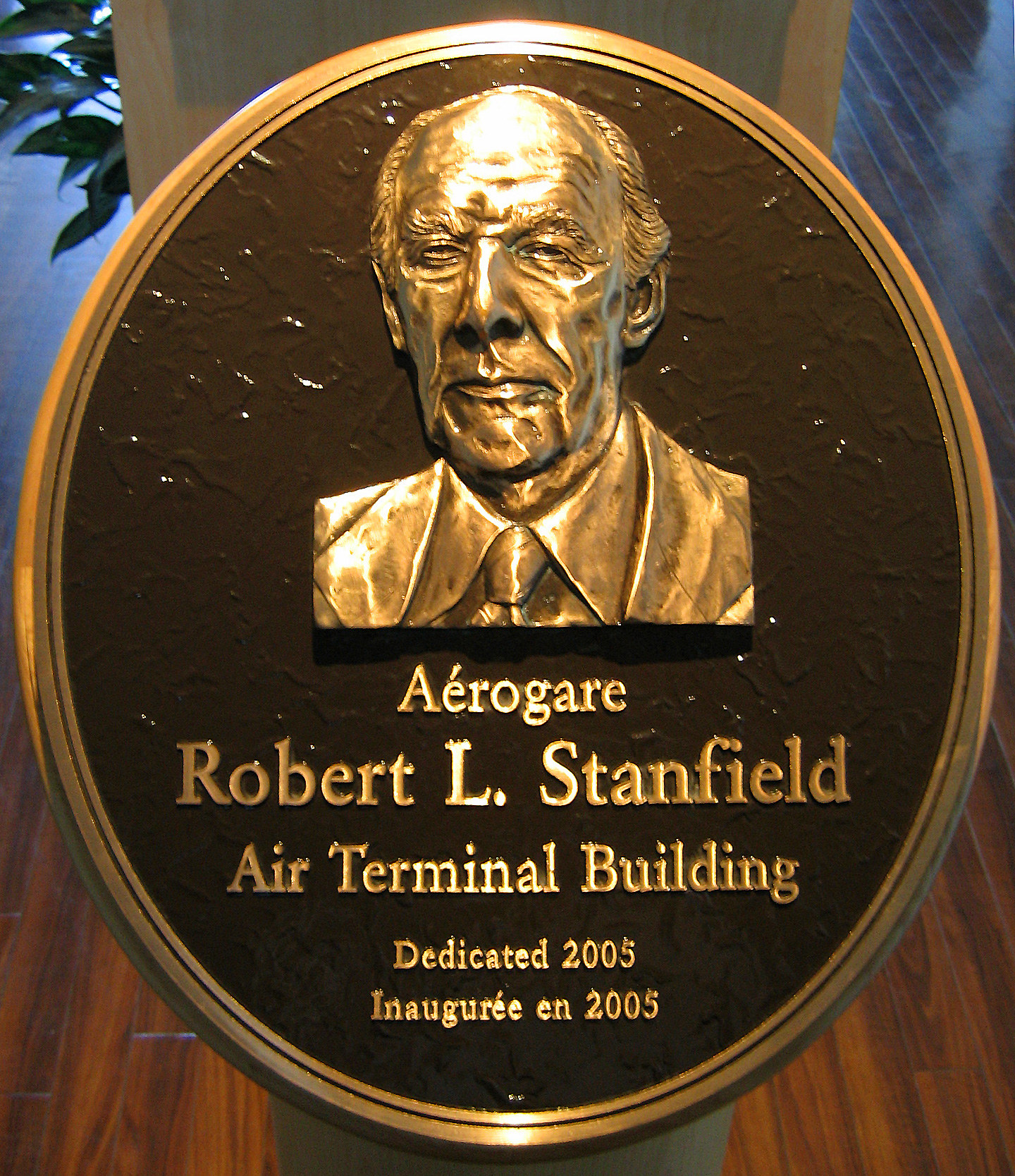
Bronze plaque of Stanfield at the Halifax Stanfield International Airport

In July 1967, Stanfield and other provincial premiers were sworn into the Queen's Privy Council for Canada on the occasion of Canada's centennial.

On July 1, 1992, as part of Canada's 125th anniversary celebrations, the Queen on advice of Prime Minister Brian Mulroney granted Stanfield and six former cabinet ministers (Alvin Hamilton, Ellen Fairclough, Jack Pickersgill, Paul Martin Sr., Jean-Luc Pepin and Martial Asselin) the right to use the title "The Right Honourable". He was one of nine Canadians entitled to the title without having held an office which such title is automatically conferred. In 2007, Halifax Robert L. Stanfield International Airport was named after him by Prime Minister Stephen Harper. He was also a Fellow of the Royal Canadian Geographical Society (FRCGS).

== Honorary degrees ==
Robert Stanfield was awarded several honorary Degrees in recognition of His service to Canada, These Include

Honorary Degrees

Location	Date	School	Degree
Nova Scotia	1967	Dalhousie University	Doctor of Engineering (D.Eng)
Quebec	11 October 1967	McGill University	Doctor of Laws (LL.D)
Nova Scotia	12 May 1969	Saint Mary's University	Doctor of Laws (LL.D)
Ontario	May 1985	McMaster University	Doctor of Laws (LL.D)
Ontario	June 1988	University of Toronto	Doctor of Laws (LL.D)
New Brunswick	1990	Mount Allison University	Doctor of Laws (LL.D)

== Federal electoral record ==
1974 Canadian federal election: Halifax
Party	Candidate	Votes	%	±%
Progressive Conservative	Robert Stanfield	14,865	49.26	-6.78
Liberal	Brian Flemming	12,282	40.70	+9.39
New Democratic	Alasdair M. Sinclair	2,817	9.33	-2.94
Social Credit	Brian Pitcairn	140	0.46	
Marxist–Leninist	Tony Seed	75	0.25	-0.13
Total valid votes		30,179	100.00	
Progressive Conservative hold		Swing		-8.08

Changes for Marxist–Leninist candidate Tony Seed are based on his results in 1972, when he ran unaffiliated.

1972 Canadian federal election: Halifax
Party	Candidate	Votes	%	±%
Progressive Conservative	Robert Stanfield	17,966	56.04	-4.29
Liberal	Terry McGrath	10,039	31.31	-4.31
New Democratic	Marty Dolin	3,936	12.28	+8.23
Independent	Tony Seed	121	0.38	
Total valid votes		32,062	100.00	
Turnout			74.43	
Eligible voters		43,078		
Progressive Conservative hold		Swing		+0.01

1968 Canadian federal election: Halifax
Party	Candidate	Votes	%	±%
Progressive Conservative	Robert Stanfield	19,569	60.33	+12.91
Liberal	M. Gregory Tompkins	11,555	35.62	-6.97
New Democratic	Gus Wedderburn	1,314	4.05	-5.42
Total valid votes		32,438	100.00	
Progressive Conservative notional hold		Swing		+9.94

^ Change compared to combined party vote totals from 1965

Canadian federal by-election, November 6, 1967: Colchester—Hants Resignation of Cyril Kennedy
Party	Candidate	Votes	%	±%
Progressive Conservative	Robert Stanfield	15,389	92.11	+40.57
Independent Liberal	Robert Kirk	1,098	6.57	
Independent	Elwood Smith	221	1.32	
Progressive Conservative hold		Swing		+40.57
