= Chuck Porter (politician) =

Canadian politician

The Honourable Chuck Porter ECNS

Member of the Nova Scotia House of Assembly for Hants West
- In office June 13, 2006 – July 17, 2021
- Preceded by: Ron Russell
- Succeeded by: Melissa Sheehy-Richard

Personal details
- Born: Garnet Charles Porter
- Party: Liberal
- Other political affiliations: Independent (2014–2016); Progressive Conservative (2006–2014)

Garnet Charles "Chuck" Porter is a Canadian politician. He represented the electoral district of Hants West in the Nova Scotia House of Assembly as a Liberal from 2006 until his retirement from politics in 2021.

== Provincial career ==
Elected in 2006, Porter was a member of the Progressive Conservatives until June 13, 2014, when he left the party to sit as an independent citing Jamie Baillie's management style as a factor (Baillie said Porter neglected his duties). On February 17, 2016, he joined the Liberal caucus. He was reelected in the 2017 election.

On July 5, 2018, Porter was appointed to the Executive Council of Nova Scotia as Minister of Municipal Affairs.

=== Electoral record ===
2013 Nova Scotia general election
Party	Candidate	Votes	%	±%
Progressive Conservative	Chuck Porter	4,468	50.75	
Liberal	Claude Sherman O'Hara	3,279	37.24	
New Democratic Party	Brian Stephens	888	10.28	

2009 Nova Scotia general election
Party	Candidate	Votes	%	±%
Progressive Conservative	Chuck Porter	3,364	37.24	
Liberal	Paula Lunn	3,065	33.93	
New Democratic Party	Barbara Gallagher	2,401	26.58	
Green	Shelia Richardson	204	2.26	

2006 Nova Scotia general election
Party	Candidate	Votes	%	±%
Progressive Conservative	Chuck Porter	2,969	34.60	
Liberal	Paula Lunn	2,924	34.08	
New Democratic Party	Sean Bennett	2,486	28.97	
Green	Sam Schurman	201	2.34	–
