= Doug Ball =

Canadian photographer

Doug Ball is a Canadian photojournalist.

== Famous photos ==
- Robert Stanfield's fumble. Doug Ball's 1974 photo of Conservative Leader / candidate fumbling a football is said to have cost him (and the Conservative Party) the election. The Canadian Press sent the picture across Canada where the photo was played on many front pages.
- Pierre Trudeau's pirouette. The 1977 photo shows Canadian Prime Minister Pierre Trudeau, in Buckingham Palace, doing a pirouette behind Queen Elizabeth II and members of the G7 at the 3rd G7 summit in London, England. This photo is arguably the most famous photo of Trudeau. "The picture, we have been led to believe, expresses his maverick anti-conformism, his democratic disdain for aristocratic pomp." However, on September 11, 2022, the Toronto Star reported that Ball had stated that, while travelling to the 4th G7 summit in Bonn, West Germany, he learned that the woman in the photograph was Princess Margaret and not Queen Elizabeth.
