= George Isaac Smith =

Premier of Nova Scotia from 1967 to 1970

George Isaac Smith MBE
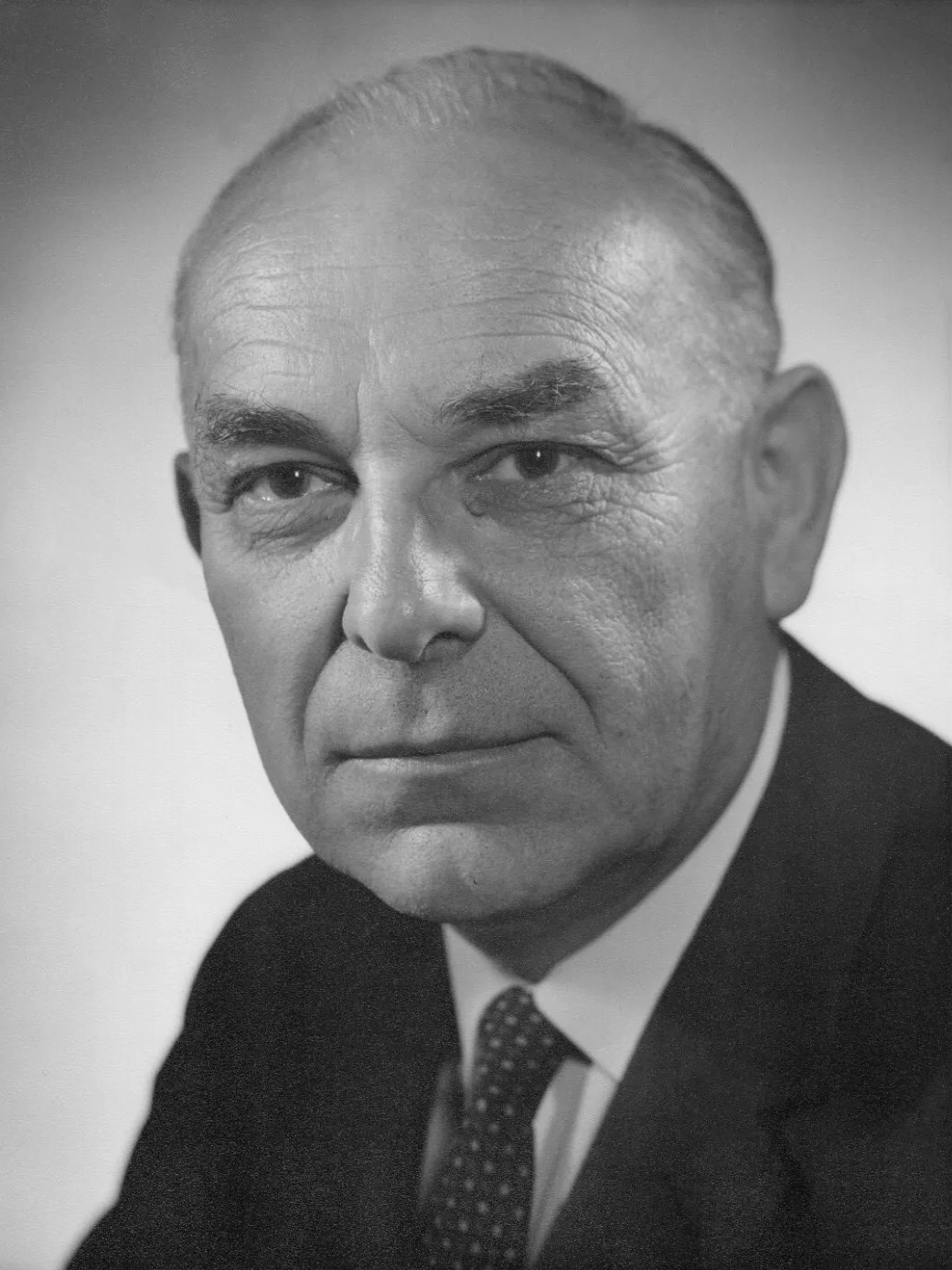
- Smith, c. 1970

18th Premier of Nova Scotia
- In office September 13, 1967 – October 28, 1970
- Monarch: Elizabeth II
- Lieutenant Governor: Henry P. MacKeen; Victor deB. Oland
- Preceded by: Robert Stanfield
- Succeeded by: Gerald Regan

MLA for Colchester
- In office June 9, 1949 – April 2, 1974 Serving with Robert Stanfield, Gerald Ritcey
- Preceded by: Gordon Purdy; Robert F. McLellan
- Succeeded by: Melinda MacLean; Floyd Tucker

Senator for Colchester
- In office August 7, 1975 – December 19, 1982
- Appointed by: Pierre Trudeau

Personal details
- Born: April 6, 1909 Stewiacke, Nova Scotia, Canada
- Died: December 19, 1982 (aged 73) Truro, Nova Scotia, Canada
- Party: Progressive Conservative
- Occupation: lawyer

George Isaac Smith MBE (April 6, 1909 – December 19, 1982) was a Canadian lawyer and politician who served as the 18th premier of Nova Scotia from 1967 to 1970. He was a Canadian senator from 1975 until his death. G.I. Smith is noted for having recruited Robert Stanfield to help rebuild and lead the Progressive Conservatives in Nova Scotia. While premier he brought Michelin Tire, still Nova Scotia's biggest employer, to the province. He established the Nova Scotia Human Rights Commission, and had the government take over Sydney Steel Corporation when its corporate owners quit the industry. His government also established the affordable housing community of Lower Sackville.

Earlier in his ministerial years, as highways minister (1956–62) he built the Bicentennial Highway and paved many miles of roads throughout the province. As finance and economics minister (1962–67) He was most noted for creating the Voluntary Economic Planning organization through which, business labour and community and academic leaders worked to develop economic plans for the province.

Smith also worked with Premier Stanfield and cabinet colleagues to create Industrial Estates Limited, a body designed to attract industry to Nova Scotia.

== Biography ==
Born in Stewiacke, Nova Scotia on April 6, 1909 to Major John Robert Smith and Susan Ettinger Coulter. Educated at Stewiacke School and Colchester County Academy, Truro. He then attended Dalhousie University and graduated with an LLB in 1932. He became Stewiacke town solicitor and Town Clerk. A few years later he joined with Tatamagouche native, and former Yarmouth federal Conservative candidate, Frank Patterson to establish a Truro Law firm Patterson Smith, presently extant as Patterson Law, where he practiced law in Truro. He served overseas in the North Nova Scotia Highlanders during World War II and was mentioned in dispatches, and ended up with rank of Lt. Colonel and was commanding officer of the regiment.

Smith was elected as a Member of the Legislative Assembly (MLA) for Colchester County in 1949 and served until 1974. He joined Robert Stanfield's cabinet when the Tories formed government in 1956. In 1967 when Stanfield left to become National PC leader, he made it clear that he would only do so if Smith would agree to succeed him as Premier of Nova Scotia.

Smith's government was defeated by the Liberals in 1970 and Smith resigned as party leader the next year. In 1975 he was summoned to the Senate of Canada by Prime Minister Pierre Trudeau and represented the senatorial division of Colchester, Nova Scotia. In the Senate Smith was a vigorous advocate of equalization payments and fair treatment of all provinces.

Smith died in office in Truro, Nova Scotia on December 19, 1982.

In 1938, Smith married law firm secretary Sally Archibald of Truro. Together they had three children John Robert (Rob), Ruby Alison and George Isaac. Sally Smith died on March 26, 2011, her 95th birthday. Their youngest son George died on Christmas Day 2012, age 58.

== See also ==
- List of political parties in Canada
