= George B. Cole =

Canadian politician

MLA for Hants West
- In office June 1949 – March 22, 1950
- Preceded by: new riding
- Succeeded by: George Henry Wilson

Personal details
- Born: 1900 Mount Uniacke, Nova Scotia
- Died: January 16, 1970
- Party: Nova Scotia Liberal Party

George Benjamin Cole (October 16, 1900 – January 16, 1970) was a Canadian politician. He represented the electoral district of Hants West in the Nova Scotia House of Assembly from June 1949 to March 1950. He was a member of the Nova Scotia Liberal Party.

Born in 1900 at Mount Uniacke, Nova Scotia, Cole was the son of George and Elizabeth (Ward) Cole. Prior to the 1949 election, Cole defeated former Windsor mayor Gordon B. Crossley for the Liberal nomination in Hants West. On election night, Cole trailed Progressive Conservative George H. Wilson by three votes, but Cole asked for a recount. On June 18, a recount resulted in a tie between Cole and Wilson which was broken when the returning officer cast the deciding vote for Cole, declaring him elected by one vote. In January 1950, Wilson appealed the election result to the Nova Scotia Supreme Court, where under the Nova Scotia Controverted Elections Act, the returning officer's decision was ruled an undue return and the election voided. After serving nine months as MLA, Cole officially vacated the seat on March 22, and did not run in the resulting byelection. Cole died on January 16, 1970.
