= Robert Hunter Smith =

Canadian politician from Nova Scotia (1876–1939)

Member of the Nova Scotia House of Assembly for Colchester County
- In office July 27, 1920 – June 24, 1925

Personal details
- Born: May 27, 1876 Hilden, Nova Scotia
- Died: December 1, 1939 (aged 63) Hilden, Nova Scotia
- Party: Farmers' Party
- Spouse: Anna Marshall
- Occupation: farmer, politician

Robert Hunter Smith (May 27, 1876 – December 1, 1939) was a farmer and political figure in Nova Scotia, Canada. He represented Colchester County in the Nova Scotia House of Assembly from 1920 to 1925 as a Farmers' Party member.

Smith was born in 1876 at Hilden, Nova Scotia to Thomas B. Smith and Emma Moren. He was educated at Truro Academy and married Anna Marshall on July 5, 1911. He served as an Indian agent at the Millbrook First Nation in Colchester County from 1906 to 1921 and was a director of Agricola Co-operatives. Smith died in 1939 at Hilden, Nova Scotia.

He was elected in the 1920 Nova Scotia general election and did not contest the 1925 Nova Scotia general election.
