= Robert H. Kennedy =

Canadian politician (1869–1951)

Member of the Nova Scotia House of Assembly for Colchester County
- In office June 14, 1911 – June 27, 1920
- Preceded by: William Davison Hill
- Succeeded by: Robert H. Smith

Personal details
- Born: December 30, 1869 Brookfield, Nova Scotia
- Died: August 24, 1951 (aged 81) Truro, Nova Scotia
- Party: Liberal-Conservative
- Spouse: Bessie Jane Ross Kennedy
- Occupation: Farmer, Businessman, Politician

Military service
- Allegiance: Canada
- Branch/service: Canadian Army
- Years of service: 1886–1918
- Rank: Captain
- Unit: 78th Pictou Regiment
- Battles/wars: First World War

Robert Hamilton Kennedy (December 30, 1869 – August 24, 1951) was a Canadian farmer, merchant and political figure. He represented Colchester County in the Nova Scotia House of Assembly from 1911 to 1920 as a Liberal-Conservative member. His son, Cyril Kennedy became a Canadian Member of Parliament.

He was born in Brookfield, Nova Scotia, the son of James Kennedy and Mary Jane Hamilton and was delivered by his grandmother, Jane Soley Hamilton. He worked on the family farm and then went to Manitoba in 1890, returning two years later and entering the lumber trade. In 1893, Kennedy worked as a carpenter in Massachusetts. He came back to Nova Scotia again later that year and from then on worked as a farmer and lumber merchant, also operating sawmills. In 1896, Kennedy married Bessie Jane Ross. He served nine years as a member of the Colchester County council. He also joined the Pictou militia in 1886, being appointed Quartermaster, and was commissioned during the First World War as a captain in the 78th Pictou Regiment but did not serve overseas. Kennedy died in a car accident in Truro on August 24, 1951.

Kennedy served in the 35th General Assembly of Nova Scotia and 36th General Assembly of Nova Scotia representing Colchester County alongside Frank Stanfield.
