= Henry T. Laurence =

Canadian politician from Nova Scotia (1841–1916)

Member of the Nova Scotia House of Assembly for Colchester County
- In office December 15, 1904 – June 20, 1906

Personal details
- Born: 1841 Port Hood, Nova Scotia
- Died: August 17, 1916 Truro, Nova Scotia
- Party: Liberal
- Spouse: Susan Flemming
- Relations: Frederick Andrew Laurence (brother);
- Education: Port Hood Academy
- Occupation: office-holder, politician

Henry T. Laurence (1841 – August 17, 1916) was an office-holder and political figure in Nova Scotia, Canada. He represented Colchester County in the Nova Scotia House of Assembly from 1904 to 1906 as a Liberal member.

Laurence was born in 1841 at Port Hood, Nova Scotia to George C. Laurence and Helen Turnbull. He was educated at Port Hood Academy and married Susan Flemming, daughter of William Flemming (House 1843–1848) of Truro, Nova Scotia, on December 14, 1871. He served as a license inspector, justice of the peace for Truro from 1903 to 1916, and mayor of Truro from 1904 to 1906. Laurence was a lieutenant-colonel in the 78th Highlanders militia. He died in 1916 at Truro.

He was elected in a by-election on December 15, 1904, replacing his brother Frederick Andrew Laurence, and did not contest the 1906 Nova Scotia general election.
