= Stanfield's =

Canadian garment manufacturer

Stanfield's Limited
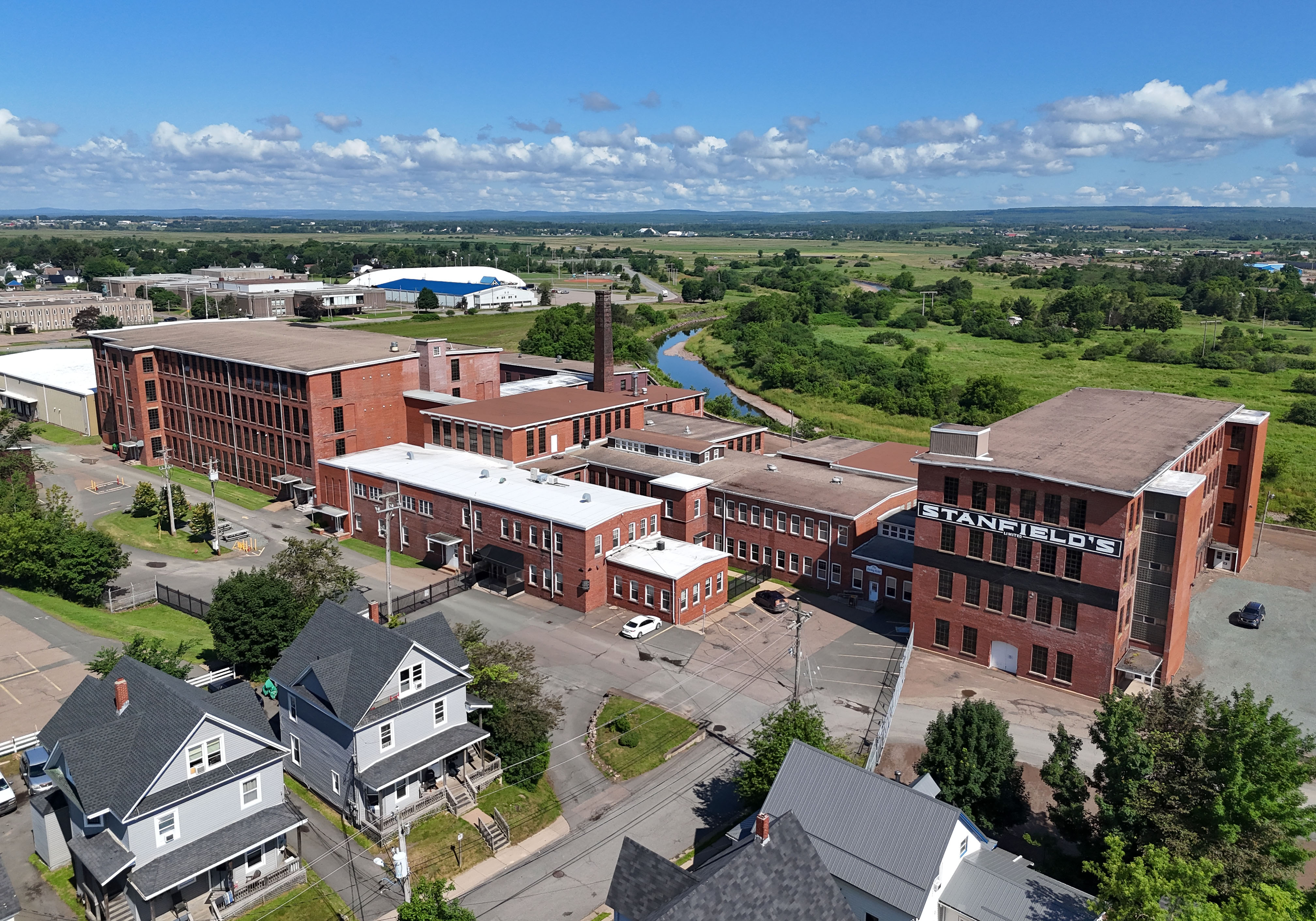
- Stanfield's woollen mill in Truro
- Type: Public limited company
- Industry: Clothing Manufacturing
- Founded: 1856; 170 years ago
- Founder: Charles E. Stanfield
- Headquarters: Truro, Nova Scotia
- Area served: Worldwide
- Number of employees: c.549
- Website: Stanfield's Limited

Stanfield's Limited (English: /ˈstænfiːld/) is a Canadian garment manufacturer based in Truro, Nova Scotia, with approximately 550 employees, whose company's products are sold throughout Canada and around the world.

== History ==
=== Founding in Prince Edward Island ===
The company traces its history to 1856 when Charles E. Stanfield and his brother-in-law Samuel E. Dawson founded Tryon Woollen Mills in Tryon, Prince Edward Island. Charles sold his interest to Samuel a decade later and moved to Truro. In 1870, Charles Stanfield established the Truro Woollen Mills on Brunswick Street, Truro, opposite the Intercolonial Railway station. He also built the St Croix Woollen Mills in St Croix, Nova Scotia and the Union Woollen Mills in Farnham, Quebec. The Truro Felt Works were later established east of the woollen mills and Stanfield finally established the current textile mill on the south bank of the Salmon River in the town in 1882.

=== Period of innovation ===
In 1896, Charles Stanfield sold his business interests to his two sons, John and Frank. They renamed the Truro factory Truro Knitting Mills Limited and concentrated on knitted merchandise. Their company was innovative and sold many products in the form of shrink-proof heavy woolen underwear that were used by workers during the Klondike Gold Rush in the late 1890s. In 1898, they developed Stanfield's Unshrinkable Underwear and in 1915 they introduced an adjustable two-piece design patented on 7 December 1915. To this day, Stanfield's is widely known as "The Underwear Company."

=== Stanfield's Limited ===
This early success led to the 1906 establishment of Stanfield's Limited. In 1910, Stanfield's bought out Hewson Woollen Mills in Amherst, which was renamed Amherst Woollen Mills. Business was brisk during both world wars and Stanfield's expanded into t-shirts and other garments following World War II.

Robert Lorne Stanfield, former premier of Nova Scotia and leader of the federal Progressive Conservative Party of Canada, was the grandson of the founder, Charles Stanfield.

== Advertising ==
In October 2010, the manufacturer launched an internet advertising campaign, supporting a testicular cancer survivor Mark McIntyre in a 25-day campaign to raise awareness of testicular cancer and cancer research. For each Facebook "like" Stanfield's agreed to donate first up to $25,000 and then $50,000 to testicular cancer research. The website garnered national news coverage in Canada and was an Internet sensation.
