= Norman T. Spence =

Canadian politician

MLA for Hants West
- In office 1963–1970
- Preceded by: George Henry Wilson
- Succeeded by: Robert D. Lindsay

Personal details
- Born: November 3, 1911 Ellershouse, Nova Scotia
- Died: August 15, 2004 (aged 92)
- Party: Progressive Conservative
- Occupation: farmer, lumberman

Norman Tremaine Spence (November 3, 1911 – August 15, 2004) was a Canadian politician. He represented the electoral district of Hants West in the Nova Scotia House of Assembly from 1963 to 1970. He was a member of the Progressive Conservative Party of Nova Scotia.

Born in 1911 at Ellershouse, Nova Scotia, Spence was a farmer and lumberman by career. He married Lois Rae Duncan in 1938. His brother Harley J. Spence also served in the Nova Scotia House of Assembly. Spence entered provincial politics in the 1963 election, winning the Hants West riding by over 1300 votes. He was re-elected in the 1967 election, defeating Liberal Robert D. Lindsay by 284 votes. In the 1970 election, Lindsay ran again and defeated Spence by 266 votes. Spence died on August 15, 2004.
