= Upper Falmouth, Nova Scotia =

Community in Nova Scotia, Canada

Coordinates: 44°57′32.72″N 64°12′27.13″W

Upper Falmouth in Nova Scotia

Upper Falmouth is an unincorporated community in the Canadian province of Nova Scotia, located in West Hants Regional Municipality.
