= Robert D. Lindsay =

Canadian politician

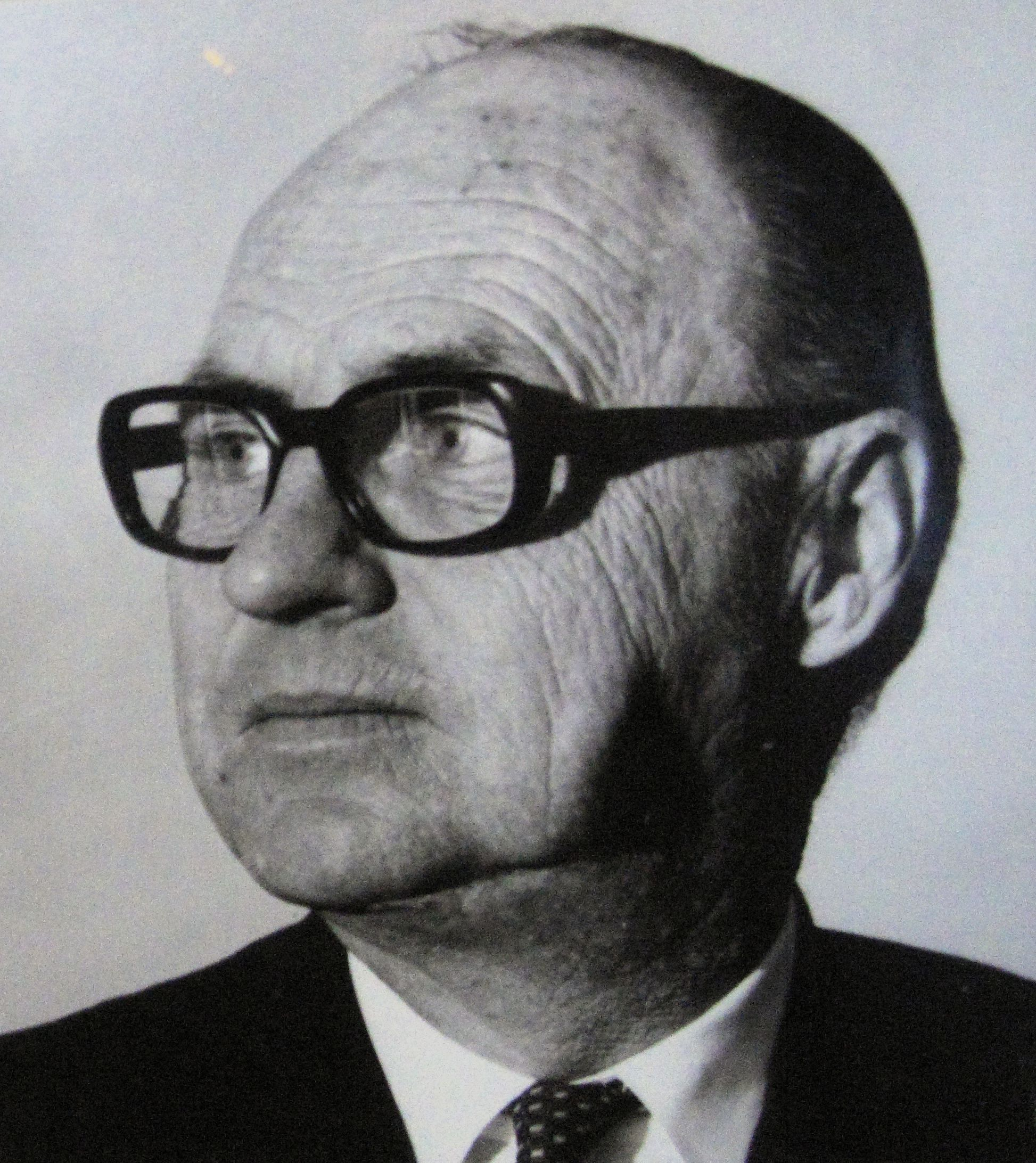
- Lindsay, c. 1973

MLA for Hants West
- In office 1970–1978
- Preceded by: Norman T. Spence
- Succeeded by: Ron Russell

Personal details
- Born: October 21, 1919 Charlottetown, Prince Edward Island
- Died: April 6, 1999 (aged 79) Halifax, Nova Scotia
- Party: Nova Scotia Liberal Party
- Occupation: Funeral director

Robert Dewar Lindsay (October 21, 1919 – April 6, 1999) was a Canadian politician. He represented the electoral district of Hants West in the Nova Scotia House of Assembly from 1970 to 1978. He was a member of the Nova Scotia Liberal Party.

== Early life and education ==
Lindsay was born in 1919 in Charlottetown, Prince Edward Island, as the son of Reverend R.W. Lindsay. He attended primary schooling in Kentville, Nova Scotia, then attended the Simmons Institute of Funeral Service in Syracuse, New York.

== Before politics ==
He was a funeral director and lived in Bedford, Nova Scotia.

== Death ==
In April 1999, Lindsay died at the Queen Elizabeth II Health Sciences Centre in Halifax. He was buried at Hazelbrook, Prince Edward Island.
