= Floyd Tucker =

Canadian politician

J. Floyd Tucker

MLA for Colchester
- In office 1974–1978
- Preceded by: George Isaac Smith; Gerald Ritcey
- Succeeded by: riding dissolved

Personal details
- Born: October 24, 1940 (age 85) New Annan, Colchester County, Nova Scotia
- Party: Nova Scotia Liberal Party
- Occupation: Pharmacist

John Floyd Tucker (born October 24, 1940) is a former Canadian politician. He represented the electoral district of Colchester in the Nova Scotia House of Assembly from 1974 to 1978. He was a member of the Nova Scotia Liberal Party.

Tucker was born in New Annan in Colchester County, Nova Scotia. He attended Dalhousie University, and later was a pharmacist. In 1968, he married Janet Lorraine Densmore.
