= Ron Russell =

Canadian politician and pilot (1926–2019)

The Honourable Ron Russell ECNS

Member of the Nova Scotia House of Assembly for Hants West
- In office 19 September 1978 – 13 June 2006
- Preceded by: Robert D. Lindsay
- Succeeded by: Chuck Porter

Speaker of the Nova Scotia House of Assembly
- In office 21 May 1998 – 20 August 1999
- Preceded by: Gerry Fogarty
- Succeeded by: Murray Scott
- In office 26 February 1991 – 28 June 1993
- Preceded by: Art Donahoe
- Succeeded by: Paul MacEwan
- In office 6 December 1978 – 19 February 1981
- Preceded by: George Doucet
- Succeeded by: Art Donahoe

Personal details
- Born: Ronald Stanley Thornton Russell; 22 July 1926 Ngongotahā, New Zealand
- Died: 7 March 2019 (aged 92) Halifax, Nova Scotia, Canada
- Party: Progressive Conservative
- Occupation: pilot

Ronald Stanley Thornton Russell (22 July 1926 – 7 March 2019) was a Canadian politician and pilot who lived in Nova Scotia.

== Early life and education ==
Russell was born in Ngongotahā, New Zealand. He was a pilot for the Royal New Zealand Air Force during the Second World War, and later joined the Royal Canadian Air Force. Russell was educated at the Ryerson Institute of Technology and Queen's University. He retired from the RCAF in 1973, and then worked several years as the Manager of Halifax International Airport.

== Political career ==
Russell served five years on the municipal council for West Hants before entering provincial politics. He was first elected to the Nova Scotia House of Assembly in the 1978 general election and was re-elected in 1981, 1984, 1988, 1993, 1998, 1999, and 2003; holding the seat until his retirement in 2006.

Russell was Speaker of the House of Assembly of Nova Scotia on three occasions, from 1978 to 1980, from 1991 to 1993 and again from 1998 until 1999. He was the first Speaker to be elected by his peers rather than be appointed by the Premier. He served in the Executive Council of Nova Scotia holding various portfolios under four different Premiers. He was Minister of Consumer Affairs from 1980 to 1981, of Health from 1985 to 1987, and was Solicitor General from 1987 to 1989 under Premier John Buchanan. He was Labour Minister from 1989 to 1991 under Roger Stuart Bacon.

== Personal life ==
Russell married Anna Isfeld. Russell died on 7 March 2019, at the age of 92.
