= Benjamin Franklin Pearson =

Canadian politician (1855–1912)

Benjamin Franklin Pearson, KC (April 4, 1855 – January 31, 1912) was a lawyer, entrepreneur and political figure in Nova Scotia, Canada. He represented Colchester County in the Nova Scotia House of Assembly from 1901 to 1911 as a Liberal member.

== Early life ==
He was born in Masstown, Nova Scotia, the son of Frederick M. Pearson and Eliza Crowe, and was educated at Pictou Academy and Dalhousie College. He studied law with Otto Schwartz Weeks and entered practice in Halifax in 1884.

== Career ==
He was involved in various business ventures, including a steamship service between Halifax and Dartmouth and a railway. He helped establish the Nova Scotia Telephone Company, the People's Heat and Light Company, the Halifax Electric Tramway Company and the Dominion Iron and Steel Company. With American partners, including Henry M. Whitney, Pearson purchased a large number of small independent coal mines in the province. He went on to establish the West India Electric Company, the Cuban Electric Company and the Mexican Light and Power Company. He also acquired a number of newspapers in Nova Scotia, including the Halifax Morning Chronicle, the Nova Scotian and Weekly Chronicle, the Daily Echo, the Glace Bay Gazette and the St. John Daily Sun.

In 1904, Pearson was named King's Counsel. In 1906, he was named minister without portfolio in the province's Executive Council. He was chosen as president of the Nova Scotia Barristers' Society in 1908.

== Personal life ==
In 1876, he married Julia Reading. Together they had a daughter named Florence, who married Fleming Blanchard McCurdy (1875–1952).

Benjamin Pearson died in Halifax at the age of 56.
