= Gerald Ritcey =

Canadian politician (1914–2001)

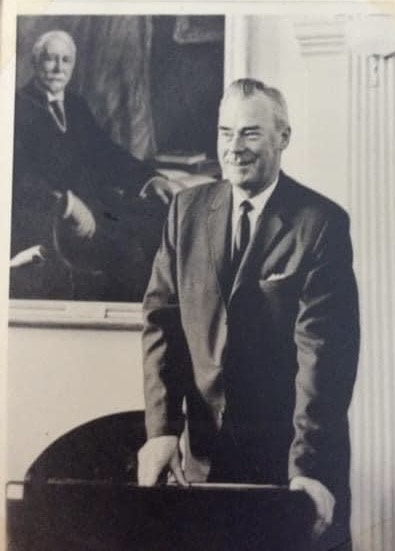
- Gerald Ritcey in the Nova Scotia legislature circa 1968

MLA for Colchester
- In office February 13, 1968 – 1974
- Preceded by: Robert Stanfield
- Succeeded by: Melinda MacLean; Floyd Tucker

Personal details
- Born: March 19, 1914 Dartmouth, Nova Scotia
- Died: November 24, 2001 (aged 87) Truro, Nova Scotia
- Party: Progressive Conservative
- Occupation: Merchant, businessman

Gerald Conrad Ritcey (March 19, 1914 – November 24, 2001) was a Canadian politician. He represented the electoral district of Colchester in the Nova Scotia House of Assembly from 1968 to 1974. He was a member of the Progressive Conservative Party of Nova Scotia.

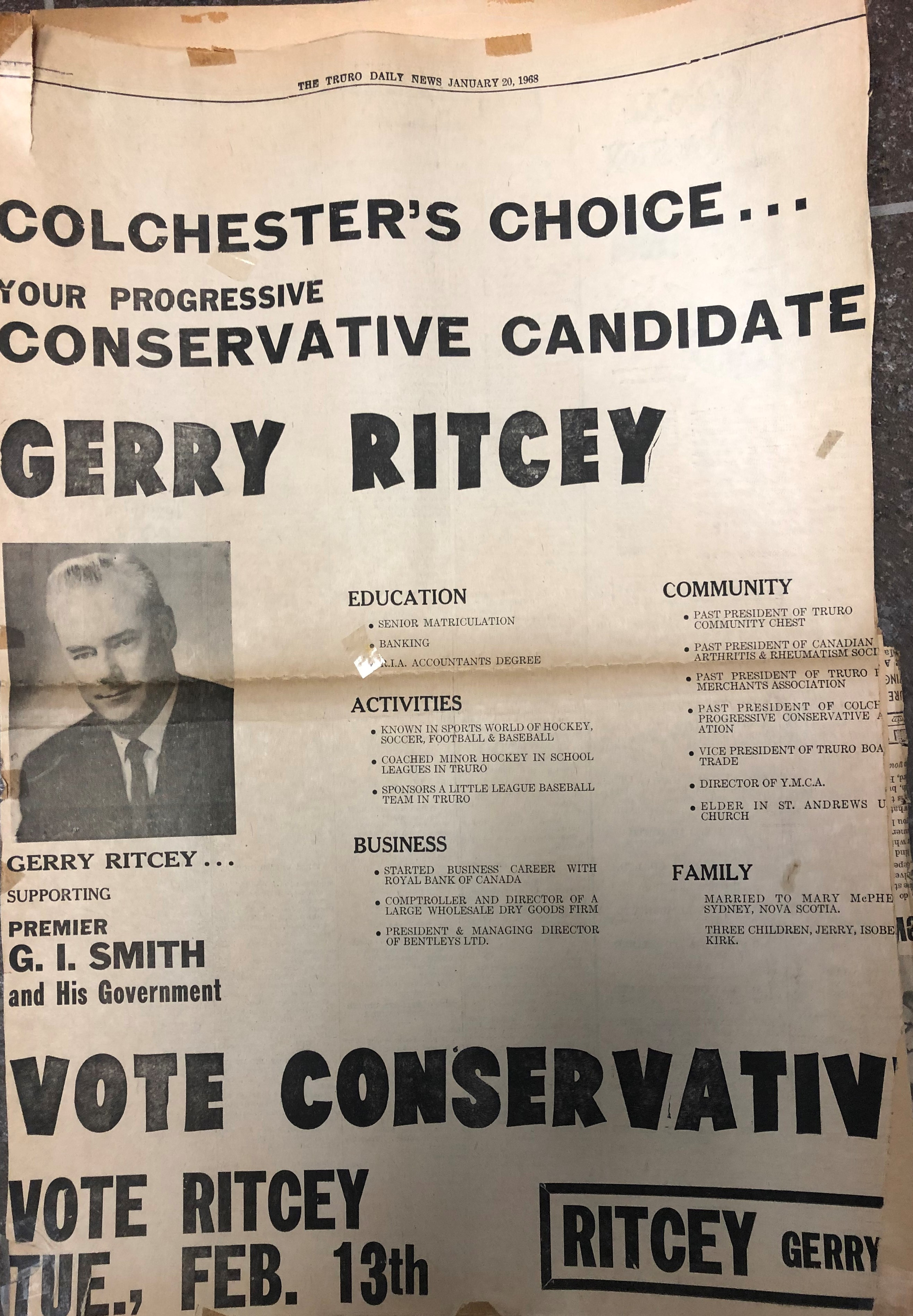
Campaign ad for Ritcey, Jan 1968

Ritcey was born in Dartmouth, Nova Scotia. He was a merchant and businessman and lived in Truro. He married Mary MacPhee in 1940. Ritcey served in the Executive Council of Nova Scotia as Minister of Trade and Industry. Ritcey died in Truro on November 24, 2001. His grandson, Dave Ritcey, was elected as an MLA on March 10, 2020 to Truro-Bible Hill-Millbrook-Salmon River, a district that was previously part of Colchester.
