= William Boardman Armstrong =

Canadian politician

William Boardman Armstrong (July 19, 1883 – January 16, 1954) was a lawyer and political figure in Nova Scotia, Canada. He represented Colchester County in the Nova Scotia House of Assembly from 1925 to 1928 as an Independent Conservative member.

He was born in Truro, Nova Scotia, the son of Reverend John J. Armstrong and Harriet ELlen Layton. Armstrong was educated at the Colchester County Academy and Dalhousie University. In 1916, he married Tena M. Williamson. He ran unsuccessfully for a federal seat in 1935. Armstrong served as registrar of deeds for Colchester County from 1928 until his death in Truro at the age of 70.
