= George Scott Dickey =

Canadian politician

George Scott Dickey (May 21, 1884 – November 6, 1953) was a farmer and political figure in Nova Scotia, Canada. He represented Colchester County in the Nova Scotia House of Assembly from 1939 to 1945 as a Progressive Conservative member.

He was born in Middle Stewiacke, Nova Scotia, the son of John Dickey and Amelia Fleck. In 1910, he married Jennie Brenton. Dickey also operated a lumber mill. He served as a member of the council for Colchester County from 1931 to 1940. He died in Middle Stewiacke in 1953.

Dickey was the first of a line of descendants to bare his name; His youngest son, George Scott Dickey II (known to the family as Junior) operated a successful engineering consultancy in Montreal QC. Junior's oldest son and namesake, George Scott Dickey III also trained as an engineer, and operates a successful contracting business in Halifax, NS. The latter G.S. Dickey's oldest son was born in 1983, and was also given the name making four successive George Scott Dickeys born over nearly 100 years.
