= William Davison Hill =

Canadian politician (1860–1944)

William Davison Hill (February 28, 1860 – November 6, 1944) was a farmer and political figure in Nova Scotia, Canada. He represented Colchester County in the Nova Scotia House of Assembly from 1906 to 1911 as a Liberal member.

He was born in at Five Islands, Colchester County, Nova Scotia, the son of Daniel Hill and Esther Davison. In 1876, Hill married Nancy Fulton. Some time afterwards, he moved from the family farm and bought his own farm at Onslow. Hill raised cattle and horses and was also involved in the sale of lumber. In 1911, he was named to the province's Legislative Council.
