= Frederick Murray Blois =

Canadian politician (1893–1984)

The Hon. Frederick Murray Blois

Senator for Colchester-Hants, Nova Scotia
- In office 1960–1976
- Appointed by: John Diefenbaker

Member of the Nova Scotia House of Assembly for Colchester
- In office 1937–1945

Personal details
- Born: March 30, 1893 Gore District, Nova Scotia
- Died: August 3, 1984 (aged 91)
- Party: Progressive Conservative

Frederick Murray Blois (March 30, 1893 – August 3, 1984) was a Canadian politician.

Born in Gore District, Nova Scotia, he was a member of the Nova Scotia House of Assembly for eight years starting in 1937 and was Conservative Party leader and Leader of the Opposition from 1941 until the 1945 provincial election wiped out the party.

Blois ran unsuccessfully for the House of Commons of Canada as the Progressive Conservative candidate in the riding of Colchester—Hants in the 1957 federal election. He lost by 389 votes to the Liberal candidate. In 1960, he was summoned to the Senate of Canada representing the senatorial division of Colchester-Hants, Nova Scotia. He resigned in 1976.
