= 56th General Assembly of Nova Scotia =

1993–1998 House of Assembly session

- Majority parliament
- Jun. 28, 1993 – Feb. 12, 1998

Parliament leaders
- Premier: John Savage; June 11, 1993 – July 18, 1997
- Russell MacLellan; July 18, 1997
- Leader of the Opposition: Terry Donahoe; June 11, 1993 – October 28, 1995
- John Hamm; October 28, 1995 – March 24, 1998

Party caucuses
- Government: Liberal Party
- Opposition: Progressive Conservative Party
- Recognized: New Democratic Party

House of Assembly
- Speaker of the House: Paul MacEwan; June 28, 1993 – November 18, 1996
- Wayne Gaudet; November 18, 1996 – July 18, 1997
- Gerry Fogarty; November 20, 1997 – February 12, 1998
- Government House leader: Richie Mann; June 28, 1993 – November 20, 1997
- Guy Brown; November 20, 1997 – February 12, 1998
- Opposition House leader: Ron Russell; June 28, 1993 – March 28, 1996
- George Moody; April 17, 1996 – February 12, 1998
- Members: 52 MLA seats

Sovereign
- Monarch: Elizabeth II; February 6, 1952
- Lieutenant governor: Lloyd Crouse; February 20, 1989 – June 23, 1994
- James Kinley; June 23, 1994

Sessions
- 1st session June 28, 1993 – April 12, 1994
- 2nd session April 12, 1994 – March 30, 1995
- 3rd session March 30, 1995 – March 28, 1996
- 4th session March 28, 1996 – April 10, 1997
- 5th session April 10, 1997 – November 20, 1997
- 6th session November 20, 1997 – February 12, 1998
← 55th	→ 57th

56th General Assembly of Nova Scotia represented Nova Scotia between June 28, 1993, and February 12, 1998, its membership being set in the 1993 Nova Scotia general election. The Liberals led by John Savage formed the government. Russell MacLellan replaced Savage as party leader and Premier in 1997.

== Division of seats ==
The division of seats within the Nova Scotia Legislature after the General Election of 1993

Leader	Party	# of Seats
Donald Cameron	Progressive Conservative	9
John Savage	Liberal	40
Alexa McDonough	NDP	3
Total		52

== List of members ==
Name	Party	Riding	First elected / previously elected
Earle Rafuse	Liberal	Annapolis	1988
J. William Gillis	Liberal	Antigonish	1970
Allister Surette	Liberal	Argyle	1993
Francene Cosman	Liberal	Bedford-Fall River	1993
Russell MacNeil	Liberal	Cape Breton Centre	1989
John MacEachern	Liberal	Cape Breton East	1988
Ron Stewart	Liberal	Cape Breton North	1993
Russell MacLellan (1997)	Liberal	Cape Breton North	1997
Paul MacEwan †	Liberal	Cape Breton Nova	1970 (Note: First elected as a New Democrat)
Manning MacDonald	Liberal	Cape Breton South	1993
Bernie Boudreau	Liberal	Cape Breton The Lakes	1988
Helen MacDonald (1997)	NDP	Cape Breton The Lakes	1997
Russell MacKinnon	Liberal	Cape Breton West	1988
Russell MacKinnon	Independent	Cape Breton West	1988
Alfie MacLeod (1995)	Progressive Conservative	Cape Breton West	1995
Jim Barkhouse	Liberal	Chester-St. Margaret's	1984
Wayne Gaudet †	Liberal	Clare	1993
Kenneth Streatch	Progressive Conservative	Colchester-Musquodoboit Valley	1978
Brooke Taylor (1993)	Progressive Conservative	Colchester-Musquodoboit Valley	1993
Ed Lorraine	Liberal	Colchester North	1981, 1988
Dennis Richards	Liberal	Cole Harbour-Eastern Passage	1993
Ross Bragg	Liberal	Cumberland North	1988
Ernie Fage (1997)	Progressive Conservative	Cumberland North	1997
Guy Brown	Liberal	Cumberland South	1974
Alan Mitchell	Liberal	Dartmouth-Cole Harbour	1993
Jim Smith	Liberal	Dartmouth East	1984
Sandy Jolly	Liberal	Dartmouth North	1988
John Savage	Liberal	Dartmouth South	1993
Joe Casey	Liberal	Digby-Annapolis	1970, 1988
Keith Colwell	Liberal	Eastern Shore	1993
Ray White	Liberal	Guysborough-Port Hawkesbury	1993
Robert Chisholm	NDP	Halifax Atlantic	1991
Gerry Fogarty †	Liberal	Halifax Bedford Basin	1993
Jay Abbass	Liberal	Halifax Chebucto	1993
Terence R. B. Donahoe	Progressive Conservative	Halifax Citadel	1978
Ed Kinley (1997)	Liberal	Halifax Citadel	1997
Alexa McDonough	NDP	Halifax Fairview	1981
Eileen O'Connell (1996)	NDP	Halifax Fairview	1996
Gerry O'Malley	Liberal	Halifax Needham	1988
Bob Carruthers	Liberal	Hants East	1993
Ron Russell	Progressive Conservative	Hants West	1978
Charles MacArthur	Liberal	Inverness	1988
George Archibald	Progressive Conservative	Kings North	1984
Robbie Harrison	Liberal	Kings South	1993
George Moody	Progressive Conservative	Kings West	1978
Lila O'Connor	Liberal	Lunenburg	1993
Don Downe	Liberal	Lunenburg West	1993
John Hamm	Progressive Conservative	Pictou Centre	1993
Donald W. Cameron	Progressive Conservative	Pictou East	1974
Wayne Fraser (1993)	Liberal	Pictou East	1993
Donald P. McInnes	Progressive Conservative	Pictou West	1978
Wayne Adams	Liberal	Preston	1993
John Leefe	Progressive Conservative	Queens	1978
Richard Mann	Liberal	Richmond	1988
Bill MacDonald	Liberal	Sackville-Beaver Bank	1993
John Holm	NDP	Sackville-Cobequid	1984
Clifford Huskilson	Liberal	Shelburne	1993
Bruce Holland	Liberal	Timberlea-Prospect	1993
Eleanor Norrie	Liberal	Truro-Bible Hill	1993
Kennie MacAskill	Liberal	Victoria	1988
Richie Hubbard	Liberal	Yarmouth	1993

† denotes the speaker. Wayne Gaudet became speaker in 1996. Gerry Fogarty became speaker in 1997.

== Former members of the 56th General Assembly ==
Name	Party	Electoral District	Cause of departure	Succeeded by	Elected
Donald W. Cameron	Progressive Conservative	Pictou East	resigned	Wayne Fraser, Liberal	August 3, 1993
Ken Streatch	Progressive Conservative	Colchester-Musquodoboit Valley	ran for federal seat	Brooke Taylor, PC	November 2, 1993
Russell MacKinnon	Liberal	Cape Breton West	ran for Mayoral position of Cape Breton Regional Municipality	Alfie MacLeod, PC	October 10, 1995
Alexa McDonough	NDP	Halifax Fairview	elected leader of federal NDP	Eileen O'Connell, NDP	June 4, 1996
Ron Stewart	Liberal	Cape Breton North	resigned	Russell MacLellan, Liberal	November 4, 1997
Bernie Boudreau	Liberal	Cape Breton The Lakes	resigned	Helen MacDonald, NDP	November 4, 1997
Ross Bragg	Liberal	Cumberland North	died	Ernie Fage, PC	November 4, 1997
Terry Donahoe	Progressive Conservative	Halifax Citadel	ran for federal seat	Ed Kinley, Liberal	November 4, 1997

== Notes ==
Preceded by 55th General Assembly of Nova Scotia	General Assemblies of Nova Scotia; 1993–1998	Succeeded by 57th General Assembly of Nova Scotia
