= 57th General Assembly of Nova Scotia =

- Minority parliament
- May. 21, 1998 – Jun. 18, 1999

Parliament leaders
- Premier: Russell MacLellan; July 18, 1997 – August 16, 1999
- Leader of the Opposition: Robert Chisholm; March 24, 1998 – August 16, 1999

Party caucuses
- Government: Liberal Party
- Opposition: New Democratic Party
- Recognized: Progressive Conservative Party

House of Assembly
- Speaker of the House: Ron Russell; May 21, 1998 – June 18, 1999
- Government House leader: Manning MacDonald; May 21, 1998 – June 18, 1999
- Opposition House leader: John Holm; May 21, 1998 – June 18, 1999
- Members: 52 MLA seats

Sovereign
- Monarch: Elizabeth II; February 6, 1952
- Lieutenant governor: James Kinley; June 23, 1994

Sessions
- 1st session May 21, 1998 – June 18, 1999
← 56th	→ 58th

57th General Assembly of Nova Scotia represented Nova Scotia between May 21, 1998, and June 18, 1999, its membership being set in the 1998 Nova Scotia general election. The Liberals led by Russell MacLellan formed a minority government with the support of the Progressive Conservatives.

== Division of seats ==
The division of seats within the Nova Scotia Legislature after the general election of 1998

Leader	Party	# of Seats
John Hamm	Progressive Conservative	14
Russell MacLellan	Liberal	19
Robert Chisholm	NDP	19
Total		52

== List of members ==
Name	Party	Riding	First elected / previously elected
Laurie Montgomery	Liberal	Annapolis	1998
Hyland Fraser	Liberal	Antigonish	1998
Neil LeBlanc	Progressive Conservative	Argyle	1984, 1998
Francene Cosman	Liberal	Bedford-Fall River	1993
Frank Corbett	NDP	Cape Breton Centre	1998
Reeves Matheson	NDP	Cape Breton East	1998
Reeves Matheson	Independent	Cape Breton East	1998
Russell MacLellan	Liberal	Cape Breton North	1997
Paul MacEwan	Liberal	Cape Breton Nova	1970 (Note: First elected as a New Democrat)
Manning MacDonald	Liberal	Cape Breton South	1993
Helen MacDonald	NDP	Cape Breton The Lakes	1997
Russell MacKinnon	Liberal	Cape Breton West	1988, 1998
Hinrich Bitter-Suermann	Progressive Conservative	Chester-St. Margaret's	1998
Hinrich Bitter-Suermann	Independent	Chester-St. Margaret's	1998
Hinrich Bitter-Suermann	NDP	Chester-St. Margaret's	1998
Wayne Gaudet	Liberal	Clare	1993
Brooke Taylor	Progressive Conservative	Colchester-Musquodoboit Valley	1993
Ed Lorraine	Liberal	Colchester North	1981, 1988
Kevin Deveaux	NDP	Cole Harbour-Eastern Passage	1998
Ernie Fage	Progressive Conservative	Cumberland North	1997
Murray K. Scott	Progressive Conservative	Cumberland South	1998
Darrell Dexter	NDP	Dartmouth-Cole Harbour	1998
Jim Smith	Liberal	Dartmouth East	1984
Jerry Pye	NDP	Dartmouth North	1998
Don Chard	NDP	Dartmouth South	1998
Gordon Balser	Progressive Conservative	Digby-Annapolis	1998
Keith Colwell	Liberal	Eastern Shore	1993
Ray White	Liberal	Guysborough-Port Hawkesbury	1993
Robert Chisholm	NDP	Halifax Atlantic	1991
Gerry Fogarty	Liberal	Halifax Bedford Basin	1993
Howard Epstein	NDP	Halifax Chebucto	1998
Peter Delefes	NDP	Halifax Citadel	1998
Eileen O'Connell	NDP	Halifax Fairview	1996
Maureen MacDonald	NDP	Halifax Needham	1998
John MacDonell	NDP	Hants East	1998
Ron Russell	Progressive Conservative	Hants West	1978
Charlie MacDonald	Liberal	Inverness	1998
George Archibald	Progressive Conservative	Kings North	1984
Robbie Harrison	Liberal	Kings South	1993
George Moody	Progressive Conservative	Kings West	1978
Michael Baker	Progressive Conservative	Lunenburg	1998
Don Downe	Liberal	Lunenburg West	1993
John Hamm	Progressive Conservative	Pictou Centre	1993
Jim DeWolfe	Progressive Conservative	Pictou East	1998
Charlie Parker	NDP	Pictou West	1998
Yvonne Atwell	NDP	Preston	1998
John Leefe	Progressive Conservative	Queens	1978
Michel Samson	Liberal	Richmond	1998
Rosemary Godin	NDP	Sackville-Beaver Bank	1998
John Holm	NDP	Sackville-Cobequid	1984
Clifford Huskilson	Liberal	Shelburne	1993
Bill Estabrooks	NDP	Timberlea-Prospect	1998
Jamie Muir	Progressive Conservative	Truro-Bible Hill	1998
Kennie MacAskill	Liberal	Victoria	1988
John Deveau	NDP	Yarmouth	1998

== Notes ==
Preceded by 56th General Assembly of Nova Scotia	General Assemblies of Nova Scotia; 1998–1999	Succeeded by 58th General Assembly of Nova Scotia
