= 2002 Nova Scotia New Democratic Party leadership election =

- June 2, 2002
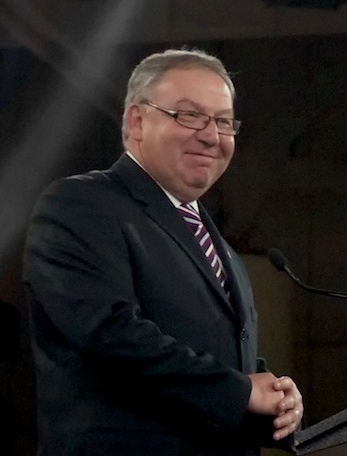
| Candidate | Darrell Dexter | John MacDonell |
| Final ballot | 2,006 (62.94%) | 1,181 (37.06%) |
Leader before election
Helen MacDonald
Elected Leader
Darrell Dexter

2002 Nova Scotia New Democratic Party leadership election
- Date: June 2, 2002
- Resigning leader: Helen MacDonald
- Won by: Darrell Dexter
- Ballots: 1
- Candidates: 2

The 2002 Nova Scotia New Democratic Party leadership election was held on June 2, 2002, to elect a successor to Helen MacDonald as leader of the Nova Scotia New Democratic Party. The election was necessary because MacDonald had resigned on April 24, 2001. Darrell Dexter was elected, defeating John MacDonell.

== Background ==
Helen MacDonald had served as leader of the Nova Scotia NDP since July 2000. She was elected as party leader, despite having lost her seat of Cape Breton-The Lakes in the 1999 Nova Scotia provincial election. As a result, one of her first priorities was to obtain a seat in the Nova Scotia House of Assembly. MacDonald decided to contest the March 6, 2001 by-election in Cape Breton North, which was caused by the resignation of Liberal MLA and former Premier Russell MacLellan. Ultimately, MacDonald placed third in the by-election. She initially continued as leader following the defeat; but after facing a caucus revolt that included at least six of the party's eleven MLAs, she opted to resign on April 24, 2001.

== Candidates ==
=== Darrell Dexter ===
Darrell Dexter was the MLA for Dartmouth-Cole Harbour. He was first elected in the 1998 Nova Scotia provincial election. He was previously a member of Dartmouth City Council from 1994 to 1996. Before entering politics, he was a lawyer, and a sub-lieutenant in the Canadian Navy.

=== John MacDonell ===
John MacDonell was the MLA for Hants East. He was first elected in the 1998 Nova Scotia provincial election. Before entering politics, he was a teacher.

== Ballot results ==
First Ballot
| Candidate | Votes | Percentage |
|---|---|---|
| Darrell Dexter | 2,006 | 62.94 |
| John MacDonell | 1,181 | 37.06 |
| Total | 3,187 | 100.00 |
