= 58th General Assembly of Nova Scotia =

1999–2003 House of Assembly session

- Majority parliament
- Aug. 20, 1999 – Jul. 5, 2003

Parliament leaders
- Premier: John Hamm; August 16, 1999
- Leader of the Opposition: None (duties shared between Liberals and NDP); August 16, 1999 – March 22, 2001
- John MacDonell; March 22, 2001 – April 29, 2001
- Darrell Dexter; April 29, 2001

Party caucuses
- Government: Progressive Conservative Party
- Opposition: New Democratic Party & Liberal Party

House of Assembly
- Speaker of the House: Murray Scott; August 20, 1999
- Government House leader: Ron Russell; August 20, 1999
- Opposition House leader: None (duties shared between Liberals and NDP); August 20, 1999 – March 20, 2001
- John Holm; March 20, 2001 – July 5, 2003
- Members: 52 MLA seats

Sovereign
- Monarch: Elizabeth II; February 6, 1952
- Lieutenant governor: James Kinley; June 23, 1994 – May 17, 2000
- Myra Freeman; May 17, 2000

Sessions
- 1st session August 20, 1999 – March 22, 2001
- 2nd session March 22, 2001 – March 27, 2003
- 3rd session March 27, 2003 – July 5, 2003
← 57th	→ 59th

The 58th General Assembly of Nova Scotia represented Nova Scotia from 1999 to 2003, its membership being set in the 1999 Nova Scotia election. The Progressive Conservative Party of Nova Scotia, under John Hamm, held the most seats and thus formed the government.

== Division of seats ==
Affiliation	Members
Progressive Conservative Party	30
Liberal Party	11
New Democratic Party	11
Total	52
Government Majority	8

== List of members ==
Riding	Member	Party	First elected / previously elected
Annapolis	Frank Chipman	Progressive Conservative	1999
Antigonish	Angus MacIsaac	Progressive Conservative	1969, (Note: Guysborough) 1999
Argyle	Neil LeBlanc	Progressive Conservative	1984, 1998
Bedford-Fall River	Peter G. Christie	Progressive Conservative	1999
Cape Breton Centre	Frank Corbett	New Democratic	1998
Cape Breton East	Dave Wilson	Liberal	1999
Cape Breton North (Note: Russell MacLellan resigned in 2001, Cecil Clarke subsequently won the by-election.)	Russell MacLellan	Liberal	1997
Cape Breton North	Cecil Clarke (2001)	Progressive Conservative	2001
Cape Breton Nova	Paul MacEwan	Liberal	1970 (Note: First elected as a New Democrat)
Cape Breton South	Manning MacDonald	Liberal	1993
Cape Breton-The Lakes	Brian Boudreau	Liberal	1999
Cape Breton-The Lakes	Brian Boudreau	Independent	1999
Cape Breton West	Russell MacKinnon	Liberal	1988, 1998
Chester-St. Margaret's	John Chataway	Progressive Conservative	1999
Clare	Wayne Gaudet	Liberal	1993
Colchester-Musquodoboit Valley	Brooke Taylor	Progressive Conservative	1993
Colchester North	Bill Langille	Progressive Conservative	1999
Cole Harbour-Eastern Passage	Kevin Deveaux	New Democratic	1998
Cumberland North	Ernie Fage	Progressive Conservative	1997
Cumberland South	Murray Scott†	Progressive Conservative	1998
Dartmouth-Cole Harbour	Darrell Dexter	New Democratic	1998
Dartmouth East	Jim Smith	Liberal	1984
Dartmouth North	Jerry Pye	New Democratic	1998
Dartmouth South	Tim Olive	Progressive Conservative	1999
Digby-Annapolis	Gordon Balser	Progressive Conservative	1998
Eastern Shore	Bill Dooks	Progressive Conservative	1999
Guysborough-Port Hawkes	Ron Chisholm	Progressive Conservative	1999
Halifax Atlantic	Robert Chisholm	New Democratic	1991
Halifax Bedford Basin	Mary Ann McGrath	Progressive Conservative	1999
Halifax Chebucto	Howard Epstein	New Democratic	1998
Halifax Citadel	Jane Purves	Progressive Conservative	1999
Halifax Fairview	Eileen O'Connell	New Democratic	1996
Halifax Fairview	Graham Steele (2001)	New Democratic	2001
Halifax Needham	Maureen MacDonald	New Democratic	1998
Hants East	John MacDonell	New Democratic	1998
Hants West	Ron Russell	Progressive Conservative	1978
Inverness	Rodney MacDonald	Progressive Conservative	1999
Kings North	Mark Parent	Progressive Conservative	1999
Kings South	David Morse	Progressive Conservative	1999
Kings West	Jon Carey	Progressive Conservative	1999
Lunenburg	Michael Baker	Progressive Conservative	1998
Lunenburg West	Don Downe (Note: Don Downe resigned before an election was called.)	Liberal	1993
Pictou Centre	John Hamm	Progressive Conservative	1993
Pictou East	James DeWolfe	Progressive Conservative	1998
Pictou West	Muriel Baillie	Progressive Conservative	1999
Preston	David Hendsbee	Progressive Conservative	1999
Queens	Kerry Morash	Progressive Conservative	1999
Richmond	Michel Samson	Liberal	1998
Sackville-Beaver Bank	Barry Barnet	Progressive Conservative	1999
Sackville-Cobequid	John Holm	New Democratic	1984
Shelburne	Cecil O'Donnell	Progressive Conservative	1999
Timberlea-Prospect	Bill Estabrooks	New Democratic	1998
Truro-Bible Hill	Jamie Muir	Progressive Conservative	1998
Victoria	Kennie MacAskill	Liberal	1988
Yarmouth	Richard Hurlburt	Progressive Conservative	1999

== Notes ==
Preceded by 57th General Assembly of Nova Scotia	General Assemblies of Nova Scotia; 1999–2003	Succeeded by 59th General Assembly of Nova Scotia
