= 2000 Nova Scotia New Democratic Party leadership election =

- July 15, 2000
Candidate	Helen MacDonald	Kevin Deveaux	Maureen MacDonald
Final ballot	322 (55.14%)	262 (44.86%)	Eliminated
Second ballot	207 (34.79%)	211 (35.46%)	177 (29.75%)
First ballot	193 (32.33%)	172 (28.81%)	154 (25.80%)
Candidate	Dave Peters	Hinrich Bitter-Suermann
Final ballot	Withdrew	Eliminated
Second ballot	Withdrew	Eliminated
First ballot	47 (7.87%)	31 (5.19%)
Leader before election
Robert Chisholm
Elected Leader
Helen MacDonald

2000 Nova Scotia New Democratic Party leadership election
- Date: July 15, 2000
- Resigning leader: Robert Chisholm
- Won by: Helen MacDonald
- Ballots: 3
- Candidates: 5

The 2000 Nova Scotia New Democratic Party leadership election was held on July 15, 2000, to elect a successor to Robert Chisholm as leader of the Nova Scotia New Democratic Party. The election was necessary because Chisholm had announced his intention to resign as party leader on November 6, 1999. Helen MacDonald was elected on the third ballot, defeating Kevin Deveaux.

== Background ==
Chisholm had previously led the Nova Scotia NDP through the 1998 and 1999 provincial elections. He unexpectedly resigned as party leader after the 1999 campaign, at the November 6, 1999 meeting of the party's provincial council.

== Candidates ==
=== Hinrich Bitter-Suermann ===
Hinrich Bitter-Suermann was previously the MLA for Chester-St. Margaret's from 1998 to 1999. Before entering politics, he was a pathologist and a physician.

=== Kevin Deveaux ===
Kevin Deveaux was the MLA for Cole Harbour-Eastern Passage. He was first elected in the 1998 provincial election. Before entering politics, he was a lawyer.

=== Helen MacDonald ===
Helen MacDonald was previously the MLA for Cape Breton The Lakes from 1997 to 1999. Before entering politics, she was a teacher.

=== Maureen MacDonald ===
Maureen MacDonald was the MLA for Halifax Needham. She was first elected in the 1998 provincial election. Before entering politics, she was a social worker.

=== Dave Peters ===
Dave Peters was previously the President of the Nova Scotia Government and General Employees Union (NSGEU) from 1994–1999 and 1975–1976. He was also the Nova Scotia NDP candidate for Pictou East in the 1993 provincial election.

== Ballot results ==
First Ballot
Candidate	Votes	Percentage
Helen MacDonald	193	32.33
Kevin Deveaux	172	28.81
Maureen MacDonald	154	25.80
Dave Peters	47	7.87
Hinrich Bitter-Suermann	31	5.19
Total	597	100.00

(Bitter-Suermann eliminated; Peters withdrew)

Second Ballot
Candidate	Votes	Percentage
Kevin Deveaux	211	35.46
Helen MacDonald	207	34.79
Maureen MacDonald	177	29.75
Total	595	100.00

(Maureen MacDonald eliminated)

Third Ballot
Candidate	Votes	Percentage
Helen MacDonald	322	55.14
Kevin Deveaux	262	44.86
Total	584	100.00
