= 57th Nova Scotia general election =

The 57th Nova Scotia general election may refer to

- the 1998 Nova Scotia general election, the 56th overall general election for Nova Scotia, for the (due to a counting error in 1859) 57th General Assembly of Nova Scotia, or
- the 1999 Nova Scotia general election, the 57th overall general election for Nova Scotia, for the 58th General Assembly of Nova Scotia, but considered the 35th general election for the Canadian province of Nova Scotia.
