= Gerald Sampson =

Canadian businessman and politician

MLA for Victoria-The Lakes
- In office 2003–2006
- Preceded by: Kennie MacAskill
- Succeeded by: Keith Bain

Personal details
- Born: 1942 (age 83–84)
- Party: Liberal
- Occupation: businessman

Gerald E. Sampson is a Canadian businessman and politician. He represented the electoral district of Victoria-The Lakes in the Nova Scotia House of Assembly from 2003 to 2006. He was a member of the Nova Scotia Liberal Party.

== Life and career ==
A resident of Big Bras d'Or, Nova Scotia, Sampson has worked for Human Resources Development Canada as an outreach worker, several trucking companies, in direct sales, and owned and managed his own business for five years. He also worked for Statistics Canada as a Census Commissioner in 1991, 1996 and 2001. Sampson attended Cape Breton University.

== Political career ==
In 1991, Sampson was elected a municipal councillor in Victoria County, Nova Scotia. He was re-elected in the 1994, 1997, and 2000 elections. Following the 2000 election, Sampson was elected by council to serve as county warden.

In November 2002, Sampson announced that he was running for the provincial Liberal nomination in the newly created Victoria-The Lakes riding. On March 29, 2003, Sampson defeated Brian Boudreau, the incumbent from Cape Breton-The Lakes on the third ballot to win the nomination. In the 2003 election, Sampson defeated Progressive Conservative Keith Bain by 248 votes to win the seat, while Boudreau who ran as an independent finished fourth. Sampson was defeated when he ran for re-election in 2006, losing to Bain by 729 votes. He attempted to regain the seat in the 2009 election, but finished second, as Bain was re-elected by 505 votes.
