= Victoria-The Lakes =

Provincial electoral district in Nova Scotia, Canada

Nova Scotia electoral district

Provincial electoral district
- Legislature: Nova Scotia House of Assembly
MLA
Dianne Timmins
Progressive Conservative
- District created: 1867
- First contested: 1867
- Last contested: 2024

Demographics
- Population (2011): 11,518
- Electors: 11,823
- Area (km²): 3,482
- Pop. density (per km²): 3.3
- Census division(s): Victoria County, Cape Breton RM

Victoria-The Lakes is a provincial electoral district in Nova Scotia, Canada, that elects one member of the Nova Scotia House of Assembly.

Its Member of the Legislative Assembly (MLA) since the 2017 election has been Keith Bain of the Progressive Conservative Party of Nova Scotia.

It was created in 1867 as Victoria, composing all of Victoria County. In 1993, the district gained the area north of the southern border of the Cape Breton Highlands National Park. In 2003, Victoria was renamed Victoria-The Lakes. It lost the top of Inverness County to Inverness and gained some of the rural areas of Cape Breton The Lakes.

== Geography ==
Victoria-The Lakes has a landmass of 3,482 km^{2} (1,344 sq mi).

== Members of the Legislative Assembly ==
This riding has elected the following members of the Legislative Assembly:

Victoria-The Lakes
Legislature	Years	Member	Party
40th	1933–1937	Frederick Walker Baldwin	Liberal-Conservative
41st	1937–1941	John Malcolm Campbell	Liberal
42nd	1941–1945	John Malcolm Campbell	Liberal
43rd	1945–1949	John Malcolm Campbell	Liberal
44th	1949–1953	Carleton L. MacMillan	Liberal
45th	1953–1956	Carleton L. MacMillan	Liberal
46th	1956–1960	Carleton L. MacMillan	Liberal
47th	1960–1963	Carleton L. MacMillan	Liberal
48th	1963–1967	Carleton L. MacMillan	Liberal
49th	1967–1970	Fisher Hudson	Progressive Conservative
50th	1970–1974	Fisher Hudson	Progressive Conservative
51st	1974–1978	Maynard MacAskill	Liberal
52nd	1978–1980	Peter John Nicholson	Liberal
52nd	1980–1981	Fisher Hudson	Progressive Conservative
53rd	1981–1984	Fisher Hudson	Progressive Conservative
54th	1984–1988	Fisher Hudson	Progressive Conservative
55th	1988–1993	Kennie MacAskill	Liberal
56th	1993–1998	Kennie MacAskill	Liberal
57th	1998–1999	Kennie MacAskill	Liberal
58th	1999–2003	Kennie MacAskill	Liberal
Victoria renamed to Victoria-The Lakes in 2003.
59th	2003–2006	Gerald Sampson	Liberal
60th	2006–2009	Keith Bain	Progressive Conservative
61st	2009–2013	Keith Bain	Progressive Conservative
62nd	2013–2017	Pam Eyking	Liberal
63rd	2017–2021	Keith Bain	Progressive Conservative
64th	2021–2024	Keith Bain	Progressive Conservative
65th	2024–present	Dianne L. Timmins	Progressive Conservative

== Election results ==
=== 2024 ===
2024 Nova Scotia general election
Party	Candidate	Votes	%	±%
Progressive Conservative	Dianne Timmins	3,685	65.45	11.08
Liberal	Stephen McAskill	1,218	21.63	-12.57
New Democratic	Samuel Stirling	510	9.06	-0.58
Green	Adrianna MacKinnon	113	2.01	–
Independent	Stemer MacLeod	104	1.85	–
Total		5,630	–	
Total rejected ballots		28		
Turnout		5,659	42.93	
Eligible voters		13,182		
Progressive Conservative hold		Swing		
Source: Elections Nova Scotia

=== 2021 ===
2021 Nova Scotia general election
Party	Candidate	Votes	%	±%	Expenditures
Progressive Conservative	Keith Bain	3,536	54.37	-5.18	$29,995.17
Liberal	Nadine Bernard	2,224	34.20	+7.39	$41,920.47
New Democratic	Adrianna MacKinnon	627	9.64	+2.23	$19,813.68
Independent	Stemer MacLeod	116	1.78	-0.83	$200.00
Total valid votes/expense limit		6,503	99.51	–	$75,775.92
Total rejected ballots		32	0.49		
Turnout		6,535	51.50		
Eligible voters		12,690			
Progressive Conservative hold		Swing		-6.23	
Source: Elections Nova Scotia

=== 2017 ===
2017 Nova Scotia general election
Party	Candidate	Votes	%	±%
Progressive Conservative	Keith Bain	4,373	59.55	+24.31
Liberal	Pam Eyking	1,969	26.81	-12.18
New Democratic	Lisa Bond	544	7.41	-16.19
Green	Adrianna MacKinnon	265	3.61	N/A
Independent	Stemer MacLeod	192	2.61	+0.43
Total valid votes		7,343	100.0	
Total rejected ballots		37	0.50	
Turnout		7,380	59.75	
Eligible voters		12,352		
Progressive Conservative gain from Liberal		Swing		+18.25
Source: Elections Nova Scotia

=== 2013 ===
2013 Nova Scotia general election
Party	Candidate	Votes	%	±%
Liberal	Pam Eyking	3,150	39.00%	8.41%
Progressive Conservative	Keith Bain	2,847	35.25%	-3.43%
New Democratic	John Frank Toney	1,907	23.61%	-3.27%
Independent	Stewart M. (Stemer) MacLeod	172	2.13%	0.58%
Total		8,076	–	
Source(s) Source: Nova Scotia Legislature (2024). "Electoral History for Victoria-The Lakes" (PDF). nslegislature.ca. Nova Scotia, Chief Electoral Officer (2013). 39th Provincial General Election, October 8, 2013: Volume 1 – Statement of Votes & Statistics (PDF). Elections Nova Scotia. Archived from the original (PDF) on 10 April 2018.

=== 2009 ===
2009 Nova Scotia general election
Party	Candidate	Votes	%	±%
Progressive Conservative	Keith Bain	2,417	38.68%	-8.80%
Liberal	Gerald Sampson	1,912	30.60%	-5.35%
New Democratic	Fraser Patterson	1,680	26.88%	14.94%
Green	James V. O'Brien	143	2.29%	-0.45%
Independent	Stemer MacLeod	97	1.55%	-0.35%
Total		6,249	–	
Source(s) Source: Nova Scotia Legislature (2021). "Victoria" (PDF). nslegislature.ca.

=== 2006 ===
2006 Nova Scotia general election
Party	Candidate	Votes	%	±%
Progressive Conservative	Keith Bain	3,001	47.48%	14.99%
Liberal	Gerald Sampson	2,272	35.94%	-0.50%
New Democratic	Joan O'Liari	755	11.94%	-2.96%
Green	Michelle Smith	173	2.74%	–
Independent	Stemer MacLeod	120	1.90%	-2.31%
Total		6,321	–	
Source(s) Source: Nova Scotia Legislature (2021). "Victoria" (PDF). nslegislature.ca.

=== 2003 ===
2003 Nova Scotia general election
Party	Candidate	Votes	%	±%
Liberal	Gerald Sampson	2,284	36.44%	-13.03%
Progressive Conservative	Keith Bain	2,036	32.48%	6.82%
New Democratic	Nancy MacKeigan	934	14.90%	-1.97%
Independent	Brian Boudreau	750	11.97%	–
Independent	Stemer MacLeod	264	4.21%	1.22%
Total		6,268	–	
Source(s) Source: Nova Scotia Legislature (2021). "Victoria" (PDF). nslegislature.ca.

=== 1933–1999 Victoria: single member ===
1999 Nova Scotia general election: Victoria
Party	Candidate	Votes	%	±%
Liberal	Kennie MacAskill	2,263	49.46%	1.38%
Progressive Conservative	Anna Curtis-Steele	1,174	25.66%	-4.81%
New Democratic	Nancy MacKeigan	772	16.87%	-0.86%
Independent	Osborne Burke	229	5.01%	–
Independent	Stewart M. (Stemer) MacLeod	137	2.99%	-0.72%
Total		4,575	–	
Source(s) Source: Nova Scotia Legislature (2024). "Electoral History for Victoria" (PDF). nslegislature.ca.

1998 Nova Scotia general election: Victoria
Party	Candidate	Votes	%	±%
Liberal	Kennie MacAskill	2,405	48.08%	-12.24%
Progressive Conservative	Dan Chiasson	1,524	30.47%	1.69%
New Democratic	Ruth Schneider	887	17.73%	9.73%
Independent	Stewart M. (Stemer) MacLeod	186	3.72%	0.82%
Total		5,002	–	
Source(s) Source: Nova Scotia Legislature (2024). "Electoral History for Victoria" (PDF). nslegislature.ca.

1993 Nova Scotia general election: Victoria
Party	Candidate	Votes	%	±%
Liberal	Kennie MacAskill	3,119	60.32%	8.71%
Progressive Conservative	Walter S. Brett	1,488	28.78%	-10.62%
New Democratic	Gerald Yetman	414	8.01%	-0.99%
Independent	Stewart M. (Stemer) MacLeod	150	2.90%	–
Total		5,171	–	
Source(s) Source: Nova Scotia Legislature (2024). "Electoral History for Victoria" (PDF). nslegislature.ca.

1988 Nova Scotia general election: Victoria
Party	Candidate	Votes	%	±%
Liberal	Kennie MacAskill	2,719	51.60%	11.77%
Progressive Conservative	Fisher Hudson	2,076	39.40%	-11.36%
New Democratic	Fraser Patterson	474	9.00%	1.13%
Total		5,269	–	
Source(s) Source: Nova Scotia Legislature (2024). "Electoral History for Victoria" (PDF). nslegislature.ca.

1984 Nova Scotia general election: Victoria
Party	Candidate	Votes	%	±%
Progressive Conservative	Fisher Hudson	2,498	50.76%	0.74%
Liberal	Elmourne K. MacKinnon	1,960	39.83%	-1.60%
New Democratic	Fraser Patterson	387	7.86%	2.54%
Labour	Bernice MacLean	76	1.54%	–
Total		4,921	–	
Source(s) Source: Nova Scotia Legislature (2024). "Electoral History for Victoria" (PDF). nslegislature.ca.

1981 Nova Scotia general election: Victoria
Party	Candidate	Votes	%	±%
Progressive Conservative	Fisher Hudson	2,357	50.02%	0.73%
Liberal	Merrill D. Buchanan	1,952	41.43%	-1.62%
New Democratic	Frank Reid	251	5.33%	-2.33%
Independent	Duncan J. Beaton	152	3.23%	–
Total		4,712	–	
Source(s) Source: Nova Scotia Legislature (2024). "Electoral History for Victoria" (PDF). nslegislature.ca.

Nova Scotia provincial by-election, 1980-05-20: Victoria
Party	Candidate	Votes	%	±%
Progressive Conservative	Fisher Hudson	2,201	49.29%	5.55%
Liberal	Murdock Matheson	1,922	43.05%	-5.24%
New Democratic	Frank Reid	342	7.66%	-0.31%
Total		4,465	–	
Source(s) Source: Nova Scotia Legislature (2024). "Electoral History for Victoria" (PDF). nslegislature.ca.

1978 Nova Scotia general election: Victoria
Party	Candidate	Votes	%	±%
Liberal	Peter John Nicholson	2,199	48.29%	-11.15%
Progressive Conservative	Catherine MacNeil Jankowski	1,992	43.74%	8.12%
New Democratic	Steve Lake	363	7.97%	3.03%
Total		4,554	–	
Source(s) Source: Nova Scotia Legislature (2024). "Electoral History for Victoria" (PDF). nslegislature.ca.

1974 Nova Scotia general election: Victoria
Party	Candidate	Votes	%	±%
Liberal	Maynard MacAskill	2,573	59.44%	16.40%
Progressive Conservative	Fisher Hudson	1,542	35.62%	-16.91%
New Democratic	Colin A. Gillis	214	4.94%	0.51%
Total		4,329	–	
Source(s) Source: Nova Scotia Legislature (2024). "Electoral History for Victoria" (PDF). nslegislature.ca.

1970 Nova Scotia general election: Victoria
Party	Candidate	Votes	%	±%
Progressive Conservative	Fisher Hudson	2,075	52.53%	-2.47%
Liberal	W. H. F. Longley	1,700	43.04%	-1.96%
New Democratic	Jessie Stone	175	4.43%	–
Total		3,950	–	
Source(s) Source: Nova Scotia Legislature (2024). "Electoral History for Victoria" (PDF). nslegislature.ca.

1967 Nova Scotia general election: Victoria
Party	Candidate	Votes	%	±%
Progressive Conservative	Fisher Hudson	2,033	55.01%	5.58%
Liberal	Duncan F. Buchanan	1,663	44.99%	-5.58%
Total		3,696	–	
Source(s) Source: Nova Scotia Legislature (2024). "Electoral History for Victoria" (PDF). nslegislature.ca.

1963 Nova Scotia general election: Victoria
Party	Candidate	Votes	%	±%
Liberal	Carleton L. MacMillan	1,934	50.58%	-2.46%
Progressive Conservative	Fisher Hudson	1,890	49.42%	2.46%
Total		3,824	–	
Source(s) Source: Nova Scotia Legislature (2024). "Electoral History for Victoria" (PDF). nslegislature.ca.

1960 Nova Scotia general election: Victoria
Party	Candidate	Votes	%	±%
Liberal	Carleton L. MacMillan	2,052	53.04%	-3.05%
Progressive Conservative	Leonard Walter Jones	1,817	46.96%	3.05%
Total		3,869	–	
Source(s) Source: Nova Scotia Legislature (2024). "Electoral History for Victoria" (PDF). nslegislature.ca.

1956 Nova Scotia general election: Victoria
Party	Candidate	Votes	%	±%
Liberal	Carleton L. MacMillan	2,162	56.08%	-0.39%
Progressive Conservative	Leonard Walter Jones	1,693	43.92%	0.39%
Total		3,855	–	
Source(s) Source: Nova Scotia Legislature (2024). "Electoral History for Victoria" (PDF). nslegislature.ca.

1953 Nova Scotia general election: Victoria
Party	Candidate	Votes	%	±%
Liberal	Carleton L. MacMillan	2,247	56.47%	-5.28%
Progressive Conservative	Joseph L. MacNeil	1,732	43.53%	5.28%
Total		3,979	–	
Source(s) Source: Nova Scotia Legislature (2024). "Electoral History for Victoria" (PDF). nslegislature.ca.

1949 Nova Scotia general election: Victoria
Party	Candidate	Votes	%	±%
Liberal	Carleton L. MacMillan	2,486	61.75%	-2.94%
Progressive Conservative	Phillip MacLeod	1,540	38.25%	2.94%
Total		4,026	–	
Source(s) Source: Nova Scotia Legislature (2024). "Electoral History for Victoria" (PDF). nslegislature.ca.

1945 Nova Scotia general election: Victoria
Party	Candidate	Votes	%	±%
Liberal	John Malcolm Campbell	2,101	64.69%	1.63%
Progressive Conservative	William R. MacCaulay	1,147	35.31%	-1.63%
Total		3,248	–	
Source(s) Source: Nova Scotia Legislature (2024). "Electoral History for Victoria" (PDF). nslegislature.ca.

1941 Nova Scotia general election: Victoria
Party	Candidate	Votes	%	±%
Liberal	John Malcolm Campbell	2,176	63.05%	5.88%
Progressive Conservative	John Roderick Fraser	1,275	36.95%	-5.88%
Total		3,451	–	
Source(s) Source: Nova Scotia Legislature (2024). "Electoral History for Victoria" (PDF). nslegislature.ca.

1937 Nova Scotia general election: Victoria
Party	Candidate	Votes	%	±%
Liberal	John Malcolm Campbell	2,335	57.17%	9.35%
Progressive Conservative	Frederick Walker Baldwin	1,749	42.83%	–
Total		4,084	–	
Source(s) Source: Nova Scotia Legislature (2024). "Electoral History for Victoria" (PDF). nslegislature.ca.

1933 Nova Scotia general election: Victoria
Party	Candidate	Votes	%
Liberal-Conservative	Frederick Walker Baldwin	2,216	52.18%
Liberal	Donald Buchanan McLeod	2,031	47.82%
Total		4,247	–
Source(s) Source: Nova Scotia Legislature (2024). "Electoral History for Victoria" (PDF). nslegislature.ca.

=== 1867–1933 Victoria: multiple members ===
1928 Nova Scotia general election: Victoria
Party	Candidate	Votes	%	Elected
Liberal	Donald Buchanan McLeod	1,840	26.65%	✓
Liberal	Daniel Alexander Cameron	1,773	25.68%	✓
Liberal-Conservative	Philip McLeod	1,652	23.92%	
Liberal-Conservative	H. A. Grant	1,640	23.75%	
Total		6,905	–	
Source(s) Source: Nova Scotia Legislature (2024). "Electoral History for Victoria" (PDF). nslegislature.ca.

1925 Nova Scotia general election: Victoria
Party	Candidate	Votes	%	Elected
Liberal	Donald Buchanan McLeod	1,874	27.05%	✓
Liberal-Conservative	Philip McLeod	1,760	25.40%	✓
Liberal	Alexander K. McKenzie	1,672	24.13%	
Liberal-Conservative	Hector A. McLeod	1,622	23.41%	
Total		6,928	–	
Source(s) Source: Nova Scotia Legislature (2024). "Electoral History for Victoria" (PDF). nslegislature.ca.

Nova Scotia provincial by-election, 1923-03-01: Victoria
Party	Candidate	Votes	%	Elected
Liberal	Daniel Alexander Cameron	acclaimed		✓
Total			–	
Source(s) Source: Nova Scotia Legislature (2024). "Electoral History for Victoria" (PDF). nslegislature.ca.

1920 Nova Scotia general election: Victoria
Party	Candidate	Votes	%	Elected
Liberal	George Henry Murray	2,078	32.42%	✓
Liberal	Angus Gladstone Buchanan	2,013	31.41%	✓
Liberal-Conservative	Philip McLeod	1,209	18.86%	
Liberal-Conservative	Guy McL Matheson	1,109	17.30%	
Total		6,409	–	
Source(s) Source: Nova Scotia Legislature (2024). "Electoral History for Victoria" (PDF). nslegislature.ca.

1916 Nova Scotia general election: Victoria
Party	Candidate	Votes	%	Elected
Liberal	George Henry Murray	1,212	27.80%	✓
Liberal	John Gillis Morrison	1,189	27.27%	✓
Liberal-Conservative	Philip McLeod	1,073	24.61%	
Liberal-Conservative	Joseph Hays	886	20.32%	
Total		4,360	–	
Source(s) Source: Nova Scotia Legislature (2024). "Electoral History for Victoria" (PDF). nslegislature.ca.

Nova Scotia provincial by-election, 1914-02-12: Victoria
Party	Candidate	Votes	%	Elected
Liberal-Conservative	Philip McLeod	1,014	50.78%	✓
Liberal	John Gillis Morrison	983	49.22%	
Total		1,997	–	
Source(s) Source: Nova Scotia Legislature (2024). "Electoral History for Victoria" (PDF). nslegislature.ca.

1911 Nova Scotia general election: Victoria
Party	Candidate	Votes	%	Elected
Liberal	George Henry Murray	1,247	33.76%	✓
Liberal	Angus A. Buchanan	1,124	30.43%	✓
Liberal-Conservative	John Lemuel Bethune	696	18.84%	
Liberal-Conservative	Duncan McDonald	627	16.97%	
Total		3,694	–	
Source(s) Source: Nova Scotia Legislature (2024). "Electoral History for Victoria" (PDF). nslegislature.ca.

Nova Scotia provincial by-election, 1909-11-24: Victoria
Party	Candidate	Votes	%	Elected
Liberal	Angus A. Buchanan	acclaimed		✓
Total			–	
Source(s) Source: Nova Scotia Legislature (2024). "Electoral History for Victoria" (PDF). nslegislature.ca.

1906 Nova Scotia general election: Victoria
Party	Candidate	Votes	%	Elected
Liberal	John Gillis Morrison	acclaimed		✓
Liberal	George Henry Murray	acclaimed		✓
Total			–	
Source(s) Source: Nova Scotia Legislature (2024). "Electoral History for Victoria" (PDF). nslegislature.ca.

1901 Nova Scotia general election: Victoria
Party	Candidate	Votes	%	Elected
Liberal	George Henry Murray	1,177	37.85%	✓
Liberal	John Gillis Morrison	1,023	32.89%	✓
Liberal-Conservative	John Archibald McDonald	581	18.68%	
Liberal-Conservative	John J. McCabe	329	10.58%	
Total		3,110	–	
Source(s) Source: Nova Scotia Legislature (2024). "Electoral History for Victoria" (PDF). nslegislature.ca.

1897 Nova Scotia general election: Victoria
Party	Candidate	Votes	%	Elected
Liberal	George Henry Murray	1,273	36.59%	✓
Liberal	John Gillis Morrison	1,093	31.42%	✓
Liberal-Conservative	John Archibald McDonald	651	18.71%	
Liberal-Conservative	A. G. McLeod	462	13.28%	
Total		3,479	–	
Source(s) Source: Nova Scotia Legislature (2024). "Electoral History for Victoria" (PDF). nslegislature.ca.

Nova Scotia provincial by-election, 1896-08-15: Victoria
Party	Candidate	Votes	%	Elected
Liberal	George Henry Murray	acclaimed		✓
Total			–	
Source(s) Source: Nova Scotia Legislature (2024). "Electoral History for Victoria" (PDF). nslegislature.ca.

1894 Nova Scotia general election: Victoria
Party	Candidate	Votes	%	Elected
Liberal-Conservative	John Lemuel Bethune	911	28.34%	✓
Liberal	John Gillis Morrison	784	24.39%	✓
Liberal	John A. Fraser	748	23.27%	
Liberal-Conservative	John J. McCabe	597	18.57%	
Liberal	M. H. MacKenzie	174	5.41%	
Total		3,214	–	
Source(s) Source: Nova Scotia Legislature (2024). "Electoral History for Victoria" (PDF). nslegislature.ca.

1890 Nova Scotia general election: Victoria
Party	Candidate	Votes	%	Elected
Liberal	John A. Fraser	971	29.71%	✓
Liberal-Conservative	John Lemuel Bethune	846	25.89%	✓
Liberal-Conservative	Murdoch McLeod	735	22.49%	
Liberal	N. E. McKay	630	19.28%	
Liberal	John J. McCabe	86	2.63%	
Total		3,268	–	
Source(s) Source: Nova Scotia Legislature (2024). "Electoral History for Victoria" (PDF). nslegislature.ca.

1886 Nova Scotia general election: Victoria
Party	Candidate	Votes	%	Elected
Independent	John Lemuel Bethune	779	26.74%	✓
Liberal	John A. Fraser	510	17.51%	✓
Liberal-Conservative	Murdoch McLeod	463	15.89%	
Liberal-Conservative	John Morrison	408	14.01%	
Liberal	John J. McCabe	385	13.22%	
Liberal-Conservative	John Munroe	368	12.63%	
Total		2,913	–	
Source(s) Source: Nova Scotia Legislature (2024). "Electoral History for Victoria" (PDF). nslegislature.ca.

1882 Nova Scotia general election: Victoria
Party	Candidate	Votes	%	Elected
Liberal-Conservative	John Archibald McDonald	874	32.94%	✓
Liberal	William F. McCurdy	600	22.62%	✓
Liberal-Conservative	John Angus Morrison	522	19.68%	
Liberal	D. J. McLeod	498	18.77%	
Independent	John Munroe	159	5.99%	
Total		2,653	–	
Source(s) Source: Nova Scotia Legislature (2024). "Electoral History for Victoria" (PDF). nslegislature.ca.

1878 Nova Scotia general election: Victoria
Party	Candidate	Votes	%	Elected
Liberal-Conservative	John Angus Morrison	607	25.92%	✓
Liberal	William F. McCurdy	594	25.36%	✓
Liberal	John Ross	580	24.77%	
Liberal-Conservative	J. McLean	368	15.71%	
Independent	William Kidston	193	8.24%	
Total		2,342	–	
Source(s) Source: Nova Scotia Legislature (2024). "Electoral History for Victoria" (PDF). nslegislature.ca.

1874 Nova Scotia general election: Victoria
Party	Candidate	Votes	%	Elected
Liberal	David McCurdy	680	33.93%	✓
Liberal	John A. Fraser	548	27.35%	✓
Independent	William Kidston	394	19.66%	
Liberal-Conservative	John Angus Morrison	382	19.06%	
Total		2,004	–	
Source(s) Source: Nova Scotia Legislature (2024). "Electoral History for Victoria" (PDF). nslegislature.ca.

Nova Scotia provincial by-election, 1873-10-23: Victoria
Party	Candidate	Votes	%	Elected
Liberal	David McCurdy	448	47.51%	✓
Not Specified	Tremain	357	37.86%	
Not Specified	Morrison	138	14.63%	
Total		943	–	
Source(s) Source: Nova Scotia Legislature (2024). "Electoral History for Victoria" (PDF). nslegislature.ca.

1871 Nova Scotia general election: Victoria
Party	Candidate	Votes	%	Elected
Liberal-Conservative	Charles James Campbell	523	28.78%	✓
Liberal	John Ross	505	27.79%	✓
Liberal	William Kidston	406	22.34%	
Liberal-Conservative	David McCurdy	383	21.08%	
Total		1,817	–	
Source(s) Source: Nova Scotia Legislature (2024). "Electoral History for Victoria" (PDF). nslegislature.ca.

1867 Nova Scotia general election: Victoria
Party	Candidate	Votes	%	Elected
Anti-Confederation	John Ross	621	37.21%	✓
Anti-Confederation	William Kidston	571	34.21%	✓
Confederation	Charles James Campbell	256	15.34%	
Confederation	McLean	162	9.71%	
Confederation	Haliburton	59	3.54%	
Total		1,669	–	
Source(s) Source: Nova Scotia Legislature (2024). "Electoral History for Victoria" (PDF). nslegislature.ca.

== See also ==
- List of Nova Scotia provincial electoral districts
- Canadian provincial electoral districts
