= Maynard MacAskill =

Canadian politician

MLA for Victoria
- In office 1974–1978
- Preceded by: Fisher Hudson
- Succeeded by: Peter John Nicholson

Personal details
- Born: November 17, 1938 (age 87) Breton Cove, Nova Scotia
- Party: Liberal
- Occupation: health care administrator

Maynard Clayton MacAskill (born November 17, 1938) is a Canadian politician. He represented the electoral district of Victoria in the Nova Scotia House of Assembly from 1974 to 1978. He is a member of the Nova Scotia Liberal Party.

MacAskill was born in Breton Cove, Nova Scotia. He attended Acadia University, Dalhousie University, and the University of Alberta, earning B.Sc., M.D., and M.H.S.A. (Master of Health Services Administration) degrees. He was a health care administrator.

MacAskill entered provincial politics in the 1974 election, defeating incumbent Fisher Husdon in the Victoria riding. He served in the Executive Council of Nova Scotia as Minister of Consumer Affairs, Minister of Education, and Minister of Health. MacAskill retired from politics prior to the 1978 election.
