= Huskilson =

Huskilson is a surname. Notable people with the surname include:

- Clifford Huskilson (1953–2026), Canadian politician
- Harold Huskilson (1920–2011), Canadian politician
