= 55th Nova Scotia general election =

The 55th Nova Scotia general election may refer to

- the 1988 Nova Scotia general election, the 54th overall general election for Nova Scotia, for the (due to a counting error in 1859) 55th General Assembly of Nova Scotia, or
- the 1993 Nova Scotia general election, the 55th overall general election for Nova Scotia, for the 56th General Assembly of Nova Scotia, but considered the 33rd general election for the Canadian province of Nova Scotia.
