= Pam Eyking =

Canadian politician

Member of the Nova Scotia House of Assembly for Victoria-The Lakes
- In office October 8, 2013 – May 30, 2017
- Preceded by: Keith Bain
- Succeeded by: Keith Bain

Personal details
- Born: 1962 (age 63–64)
- Party: Liberal
- Spouse: Mark Eyking

Pam Eyking (née Cullen; born 1962) is a Canadian politician, who was elected to the Nova Scotia House of Assembly in the 2013 provincial election. A member of the Nova Scotia Liberal Party, she represented the electoral district of Victoria-The Lakes.

She is married to Mark Eyking, the former federal Member of Parliament for Sydney—Victoria, who represented the riding from 2000-2019.

In the 2017 election, Eyking was defeated by former MLA Keith Bain.

== Electoral record ==
2017 Nova Scotia general election: Victoria-The Lakes
Party	Candidate	Votes	%	±%
Progressive Conservative	Keith Bain	4,373	59.55	+24.31
Liberal	Pam Eyking	1,969	26.81	-12.18
New Democratic	Lisa Bond	544	7.41	-16.19
Green	Adrianna MacKinnon	265	3.61	N/A
Independent	Stemer MacLeod	192	2.61	+0.43
Total valid votes		7,343	100.0	
Total rejected ballots		37	0.50	
Turnout		7,380	59.75	
Eligible voters		12,352		
Progressive Conservative gain from Liberal		Swing		+18.25
Source: Elections Nova Scotia

2013 Nova Scotia general election, Victoria-The Lakes
Party	Candidate	Votes	%	±%
Liberal Party of Nova Scotia	Pam Eyking	3,150	38.99	
Progressive Conservative	Keith Bain	2,847	35.24	
New Democratic Party	John Frank Tomey	1,907	23.60	
Independent	Stewart M. (Stemer) MacLeod	176	2.18	
