= Brian Boudreau =

Canadian politician (1954–2021)

MLA for Cape Breton The Lakes
- In office 1999–2003
- Preceded by: Helen MacDonald
- Succeeded by: riding dissolved

Personal details
- Born: July 19, 1954 Bras d'Or, Nova Scotia, Canada
- Died: October 12, 2021 (aged 67) Bras d'Or, Nova Scotia, Canada
- Party: Liberal (1999–2003); Independent (2003)

Brian Vincent Boudreau (July 19, 1954 – October 12, 2021) was a Canadian politician. He represented the electoral district of Cape Breton The Lakes in the Nova Scotia House of Assembly from 1999 to 2003. He was a member of the Nova Scotia Liberal Party.

== Early life and municipal politics ==
Born in 1954 at Bras d'Or, Nova Scotia, Boudreau served as a municipal councilor in Cape Breton County. In 1995, following municipal amalgamation, Boudreau was elected to council for the newly formed Cape Breton Regional Municipality, where he served as deputy mayor.

== Provincial politics ==
Boudreau entered provincial politics in the 1999 election, defeating New Democrat incumbent Helen MacDonald by 101 votes in the Cape Breton The Lakes riding.

In 2002, Boudreau's riding was eliminated following redistribution and he announced his intention to seek the Liberal nomination in the new Victoria-The Lakes riding. On March 29, 2003, Boudreau was defeated for the nomination by Victoria County Warden Gerald Sampson. On April 2, Boudreau quit the Liberal caucus to sit as an independent. On April 14, Boudreau announced that he would seek re-election in the 2003 election, running as an independent candidate in Victoria-The Lakes. On election night, Sampson won the seat, defeating Progressive Conservative Keith Bain by 248 votes, with Boudreau finishing fourth. He died on October 12, 2021, at the age of 67.
