= 1988 Nova Scotia general election =

Canadian provincial election

- September 6, 1988

52 seats of the Nova Scotia House of Assembly 27 seats needed for a majority
- Turnout: 75.76% ▲8.24 pp
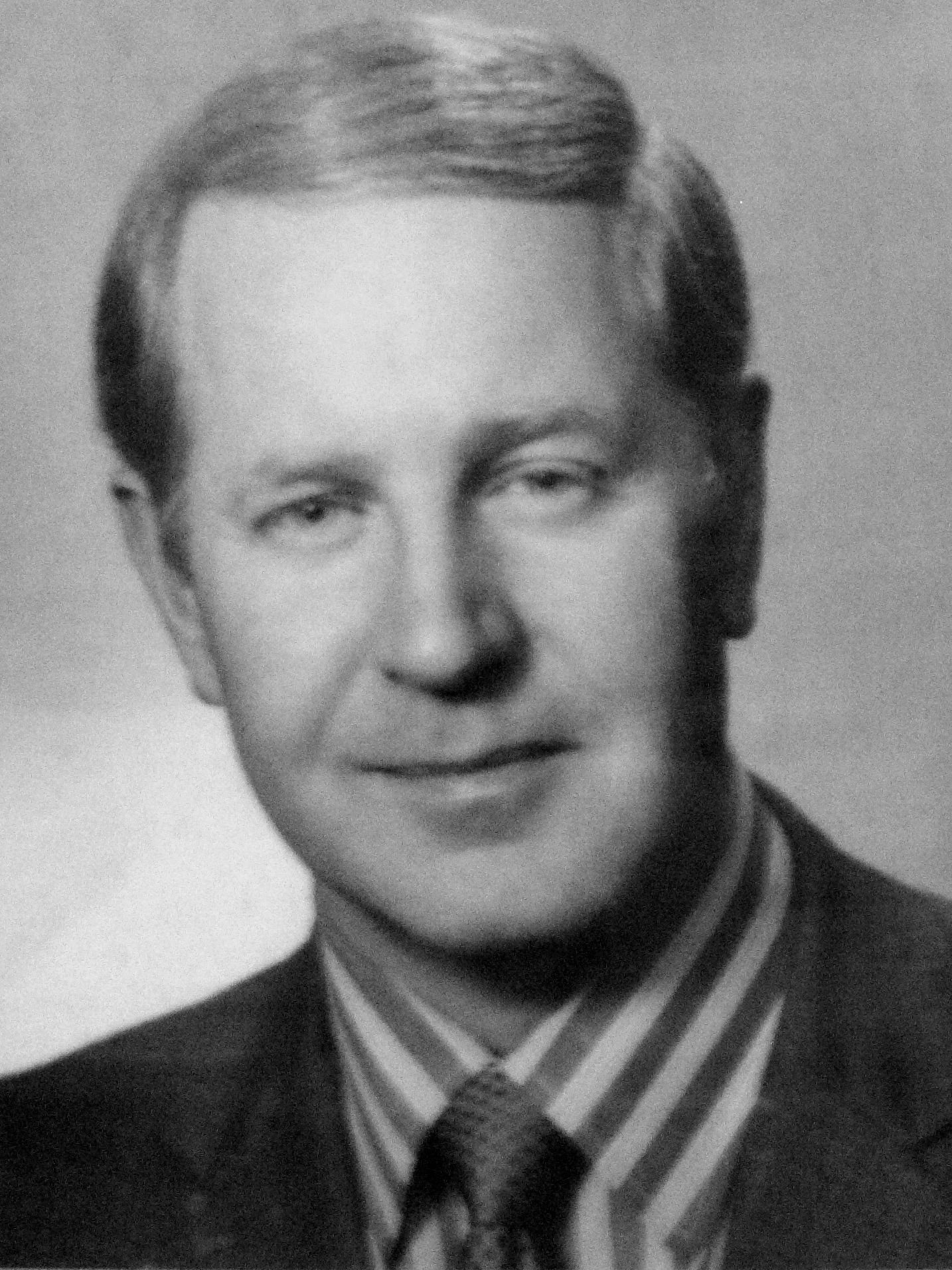

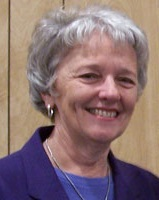
	First party	Second party	Third party
		Lib
Leader	John Buchanan	Vince MacLean	Alexa McDonough
Party	Progressive Conservative	Liberal	New Democratic
Leader since	March 6, 1971	February 22, 1986	November 16, 1980
Leader's seat	Halifax Atlantic	Cape Breton South	Halifax Chebucto
Last election	42	6	3
Seats won	28	21	2
Seat change	▼14	▲15	▼1
Popular vote	204,150	186,007	74,038
Percentage	43.21%	39.37%	15.67%
Swing	▼7.20pp	▲8.22pp	▼0.20pp
Premier before election
John Buchanan
Progressive Conservative
Premier after election
John Buchanan
Progressive Conservative

The 1988 Nova Scotia general election was held on September 6, 1988, to elect members of the 55th House of Assembly of the province of Nova Scotia, Canada. It was won by the Progressive Conservative party.

John Dunsworth, who would later gain fame for playing alcoholic trailer park supervisor Jim Lahey on the TV series Trailer Park Boys, stood as the NDP candidate in Halifax Bedford Basin. He finished in third place with a little over 19% of the vote. His underdog campaign was later the subject of a short documentary.

== Opinion polls ==
Evolution of voting intentions at provincial level
Polling firm	Last day of survey	Source	PCNS	LANS	NSNDP	Other	ME	Sample
Election 1988	September 6, 1988		43.21	39.37	15.67	1.19		
Angus Reid	August 30, 1988		45	34	20	—N/a	4.0	601
Omnifacts	August 1988		41	40	19	—N/a	3.5	804
Omnifacts	July 1988		37	38	25	—N/a	2.5	650
Omnifacts	October 1987		35	41	24	—N/a	—N/a	500
Omnifacts	October 1986		32.7	46.9	20.4	—N/a	—N/a	—N/a
Omnifacts	July 25, 1986		30	44	25	—N/a	—N/a	419
Election 1984	November 6, 1984		50.41	31.15	15.87	2.15		

== Results ==
=== Results by party ===
↓
28	21	2	1
Progressive Conservative	Liberal	New Democratic	Ind

Official results
Party	Party leader	# of candidates	Seats				Popular vote		
Party	Party leader	# of candidates	1984	Dissolution	Elected	Change	#	%	Change (pp)
Progressive Conservative	John Buchanan	52	42	40	28	-14	204,150	43.21%	-7.20%
Liberal	Vince MacLean	52	6	6	21	+15	186,007	39.37%	+8.22%
New Democratic	Alexa McDonough	52	3	3	2	-1	74,038	15.67%	-0.20%
Independent		7	0	2	1	+1	5,638	1.19%	+1.04%
Vacant				1					
Total valid votes							469,833	99.45%	-0.13%
Blank and invalid ballots							2,604	0.55%	+0.13%
Total		163	52	52	52	–	472,437	100.00%	–
Registered voters / turnout							623,586	75.76%	+8.24%

Popular vote
PC	43.21%
Liberal	39.37%
New Democratic	15.67%
Independent	1.19%

Seats summary
PC	53.85%
Liberal	40.38%
New Democratic	3.85%
Independent	1.92%

== Retiring incumbents ==
Progressive Conservative

- Maxine Cochran, Lunenburg Centre
- Mike Laffin, Cape Breton Centre
- Merryl Lawton, Digby
- Donnie MacLeod, Cape Breton East
- Alex McIntosh, Yarmouth
- Edmund L. Morris, Halifax Needham
- Mel Pickings, Lunenburg West
- Gerry Sheehy, Annapolis East

New Democratic Party

- Bob Levy, Kings South

== Nominated candidates ==
Legend
bold denotes party leader
† denotes an incumbent who is not running for re-election or was defeated in nomination contest

=== Valley ===
Electoral district	Candidates				Incumbent
Electoral district	PC	Liberal	NDP	Independent	Incumbent
Annapolis East	Graham Smith; 3,188; 44.33%	Earl Rayfuse; 3,519; 48.93%	Margaret Wolfe; 485; 6.74%		Gerry Sheehy†
Annapolis West	Greg Kerr; 3,090; 55.78%	Daurene Lewis; 2,068; 37.33%	Nancy Onysko; 306; 5.52%	Leo E. MacDonald; 76; 1.37%	Greg Kerr
Clare	Guy LeBlanc; 3,587; 54.02%	Nadine Boudreau; 2,773; 41.76%	Jan Slakov-Crombie; 280; 4.22%		Guy LeBlanc
Digby	Maxine Connell; 2,687; 40.43%	Joseph H. Casey; 3,514; 52.87%	Susan Jamieson; 445; 6.70%		Merryl Lawton†
Hants West	Ron Russell; 5,091; 52.84%	Donzell A. Ross; 2,829; 29.36%	Penny Reid; 1,715; 17.80%		Ron Russell
Kings North	George Archibald; 3,868; 45.42%	Glenn Ells; 3,116; 36.59%	Don Fraser; 1,532; 17.99%		George Archibald
Kings South	Derrick Kimball; 3,531; 42.44%	Perry Wallace; 1,710; 20.55%	Steve Mattson; 3,079; 37.01%		Bob Levy†
Kings West	George Moody; 5,899; 59.61%	Frank Bezanson; 3,114; 31.47%	Ralph Lynch; 883; 8.92%		George Moody

=== South Shore ===
Electoral district	Candidates				Incumbent
Electoral district	PC	Liberal	NDP	Independent	Incumbent
Argyle	Neil LeBlanc; 3,798; 64.14%	Rick Murphy; 1,862; 31.45%	Raymond Ethier; 261; 4.41%		Neil LeBlanc
Lunenburg Centre	Al Mosher; 5,071; 46.52%	Don Zwicker; 4,024; 36.92%	Muriel Maybee; 1,805; 16.56%		Maxine Cochran†
Lunenburg East	Richard P. Eldridge; 2,352; 38.91%	Jim Barkhouse; 3,024; 50.02%	Wanda Broome; 623; 10.31%	Malcolm Callaway; 46; 0.76%	Jim Barkhouse
Lunenburg West	Marie Dechman; 3,511; 42.34%	Jack Logan; 3,243; 39.11%	John Scott; 1,539; 18.56%		Mel Pickings†
Queens	John Leefe; 4,099; 56.04%	Dave Randall; 2,228; 30.46%	Margo Kleiker; 988; 13.51%		John Leefe
Shelburne	Tim Van Zoost; 4,241; 41.85%	Harold Huskilson; 5,224; 51.54%	Ralph Niessen; 670; 6.61%		Harold Huskilson
Yarmouth	Leroy Legere; 4,479; 44.86%	Fraser Mooney; 4,138; 41.44%	Brian Noble; 1,368; 13.70%		Alex McIntosh†

=== Fundy-Northeast ===
Electoral district	Candidates				Incumbent
Electoral district	PC	Liberal	NDP	Independent	Incumbent
Colchester North	Jack Coupar; 4,097; 44.85%	Ed Lorraine; 4,260; 46.63%	Penny Marchbank; 778; 8.52%		Jack Coupar
Colchester South	R. Colin Stewart; 3,855; 56.11%	Larry Thomas; 2,462; 35.83%	Julia A. Skipper; 554; 8.06%		R. Colin Stewart
Cumberland Centre	Scott Lockart; 1,108; 25.26%	Guy Brown; 3,117; 71.05%	Gary Thomas; 162; 3.69%		Guy Brown
Cumberland East	Roger Stuart Bacon; 4,758; 52.31%	Carolyn Drysdale; 3,276; 36.02%	Jim Mitchell; 1,062; 11.68%		Roger Stuart Bacon
Cumberland West	Gardner Hurley; 2,306; 44.31%	Ross Bragg; 2,389; 45.91%	Barbara Jack; 509; 9.78%		Gardner Hurley
Hants East	Cora Etter; 3,977; 41.60%	Jack Hawkins; 4,502; 47.09%	Richard Preeper; 1,082; 11.32%		Cora Etter
Truro—Bible Hill	Ron Giffin; 4,479; 50.43%	Kirby Eileen Grant; 3,490; 39.30%	Carol Martin; 912; 10.27%		Ron Giffin

=== Central Halifax ===
Electoral district	Candidates				Incumbent
Electoral district	PC	Liberal	NDP	Independent	Incumbent
Halifax Bedford Basin	Joel Matheson; 6,462; 45.56%	Penny LaRocque; 4,977; 35.09%	John Dunsworth; 2,746; 19.36%		Joel Matheson
Halifax Chebucto	J. Clair Callaghan; 3,214; 35.72%	Penny Doherty; 2,546; 28.30%	**Alexa McDonough**; 3,238; 35.99%		Alexa McDonough
Halifax Citadel	Art Donahoe; 3,283; 35.11%	Jay Abbass; 2,882; 30.82%	Eileen O'Connell; 3,057; 32.70%	Frank J. Fawson; 128; 1.37%	Art Donahoe
Halifax Cornwallis	Terry Donahoe; 4,195; 39.91%	Liz Crocker; 4,013; 38.18%	Allan O'Brien; 2,304; 21.92%		Terry Donahoe
Halifax Needham	Randy Dewell; 2,116; 25.56%	Gerry O'Malley; 3,469; 41.91%	Maureen MacDonald; 2,693; 32.53%		Edmund L. Morris†

=== Suburban Halifax ===
Electoral district	Candidates				Incumbent
Electoral district	PC	Liberal	NDP	Independent	Incumbent
Bedford-Musquodoboit Valley	Ken Streatch; 5,740; 51.49%	Geoff Regan; 3,803; 34.12%	Susan Coldwell; 1,604; 14.39%		Ken Streatch
Halifax Atlantic	**John Buchanan**; 6,284; 56.33%	Doug Adams; 2,763; 24.77%	Rene Quigley; 1,976; 17.71%	Arthur R. Canning; 77; 0.69% Emanuel Jannasch; 55; 0.49%	John Buchanan
Halifax-St. Margaret's	Jerry Lawrence; 4,574; 37.31%	Kevin Burke; 4,061; 33.13%	Bill Estabrooks; 3,623; 29.56%		Jerry Lawrence
Sackville	Dave Grace; 4,774; 31.78%	Bruce Stephen; 4,816; 32.06%	John Holm; 5,430; 36.15%		John Holm

=== Dartmouth/Cole Harbour/Eastern Shore ===
Electoral district	Candidates				Incumbent
Electoral district	PC	Liberal	NDP	Independent	Incumbent
Cole Harbour	David Nantes; 6,280; 47.58%	Alan Mitchell; 4,892; 37.06%	Flora Christie; 2,027; 15.36%		David Nantes
Dartmouth East	Jack Greenough; 4,940; 40.88%	Jim Smith; 5,193; 42.98%	Maureen Vine; 1,950; 16.14%		Jim Smith
Dartmouth North	Laird Stirling; 3,389; 41.64%	Sandy Jolly; 3,510; 43.13%	Brenda Thompson; 1,239; 15.22%		Laird Stirling
Dartmouth South	Roland J. Thornhill; 4,449; 47.33%	Allan Peters; 2,987; 31.78%	Joanne Lamey; 1,963; 20.89%		Roland J. Thornhill
Halifax Eastern Shore	Tom McInnis; 5,762; 54.01%	Eric Hill; 3,810; 35.71%	David Noseworthy; 1,097; 10.28%		Tom McInnis

=== Central Nova ===
Electoral district	Candidates				Incumbent
Electoral district	PC	Liberal	NDP	Independent	Incumbent
Antigonish	Bill Garvie; 4,463; 39.57%	Bill Gillis; 6,004; 53.24%	Bill Woodfine; 811; 7.19%		Bill Gillis
Guysborough	Chuck MacNeil; 4,508; 58.23%	Joe Sullivan; 3,454; 44.93%	Sarah Wilson; 503; 6.54%		Chuck MacNeil
Pictou Centre	Jack MacIsaac; 6,566; 57.80%	Bob Leahy; 3,116; 27.43%	Gerard Currie; 1,677; 14.76%		Jack MacIsaac
Pictou East	Donald Cameron; 3,996; 49.84%	Wayne Fraser; 3,243; 40.45%	Cecil MacNeil; 778; 9.70%		Donald Cameron
Pictou West	Donald P. McInnes; 3,824; 54.74%	John J. Henderson; 2,278; 32.61%	Geoff Moore; 884; 12.65%		Donald P. McInnes

=== Cape Breton ===
Electoral district	Candidates				Incumbent
Electoral district	PC	Liberal	NDP	Independent	Incumbent
Cape Breton Centre	Harold MacDonald; 2,210; 27.50%	Wayne Connors; 3,681; 45.80%	John Wilson; 2,146; 26.70%		Mike Laffin†
Cape Breton East	Bruce Clark; 4,014; 35.39%	John MacEachern; 5,739; 50.60%	Terry McVarish; 1,590; 14.02%		Donnie MacLeod†
Cape Breton North	Brian Young; 6,018; 60.68%	Robert E. McGrath; 2,042; 20.59%	Gerald Yetman; 1,858; 18.73%		Brian Young
Cape Breton Nova	Joe Burke; 1,060; 14.05%	Dan MacRury; 2,603; 34.51%	Terry Crawley; 686; 9.09%	Paul MacEwan; 3,194; 42.34%	Paul MacEwan
Cape Breton South	Murdock Smith; 3,461; 27.78%	**Vince MacLean**; 7,820; 62.76%	Ed MacLeod; 1,179; 9.46%		Vince MacLean
Cape Breton—The Lakes	John Newell; 3,282; 35.52%	Bernie Boudreau; 4,192; 45.37%	Helen MacDonald; 1,766; 19.11%		John Newell
Cape Breton West	"Big" Donnie MacLeod; 4,050; 35.87%	Russell MacKinnon; 6,133; 54.31%	Con Mills; 1,109; 9.82%		"Big" Donnie MacLeod
Inverness North	Norman J. MacLean; 2,865; 36.16%	Charles MacArthur; 3,666; 46.27%	Ben Boucher; 1,392; 17.57%		Norman J. MacLean
Inverness South	Archie MacLachlan; 866; 15.87%	Danny Graham; 2,185; 40.03%	Martin Beaton; 345; 6.32%	Billy Joe MacLean; 2,062; 37.78%	Billy Joe MacLean
Richmond	Robert F. Martel; 3,135; 41.70%	Richie Mann; 3,528; 46.93%	Clair Rankin; 855; 11.37%		Vacant
Victoria	Fisher Hudson; 2,076; 39.40%	Kennie MacAskill; 2,719; 51.60%	Fraser Patterson; 474; 9.00%		Fisher Hudson
