= Angus A. Buchanan =

Canadian politician

Angus A. Buchanan (January 28, 1861 – January 12, 1914) was a merchant and political figure in Nova Scotia, Canada. He represented Victoria County in the Nova Scotia House of Assembly from 1909 to 1914 as a Liberal member.

He was born in St. Ann's, Victoria County, Nova Scotia, the son of Angus Buchanan. He married Mary Isabel McLeod. Buchanan was first elected to the provincial assembly in a 1909 by-election held after John Gillis Morrison resigned his seat. He lived in Neil Harbour in Victoria County and died there in office at the age of 52.

His son Angus Gladstone Buchanan also represented Victoria County in the provincial assembly.
