= Philip McLeod =

Canadian politician from Nova Scotia (1879-1960)

Member of the Nova Scotia House of Assembly for Victoria County
- In office June 25, 1925 – September 30, 1928

Personal details
- Born: December 5, 1879 Baddeck, Nova Scotia
- Died: October 22, 1960 (aged 80) Baddeck, Nova Scotia
- Party: Liberal Conservative, Conservative
- Spouse: Christine Macaulay
- Occupation: merchant, politician

Philip McLeod (December 5, 1879 – October 22, 1960) was a merchant and political figure in Nova Scotia, Canada. He represented Victoria County in the Nova Scotia House of Assembly from 1925 to 1928 as a Liberal Conservative member. He was first elected in a 1914 by-election which was overturned by the courts. McLeod was an unsuccessful candidate in the 1916 and 1920 elections before being elected in 1925. He subsequently was unsuccessful seeking re-election in 1928.
