= John Angus Morrison =

Canadian politician from Nova Scotia (1833-1921)

Member of the Nova Scotia House of Assembly for Victoria County
- In office December 18, 1874 – June 20, 1882

Personal details
- Born: April 18, 1833 St. Anns, Nova Scotia
- Died: July 12, 1921 (aged 88) St. Anns, Nova Scotia
- Party: Liberal Conservative
- Spouse(s): Annie Bella McLean; Katherine McKay
- Education: Dalhousie University
- Occupation: teacher, postmaster, farmer, politician

John Angus Morrison (April 18, 1833 – July 12, 1921) was a teacher, postmaster, farmer, and political figure in Nova Scotia, Canada. He represented Victoria County in the Nova Scotia House of Assembly from 1874 to 1882 as a Liberal Conservative member. He was elected in the 1874 and 1878 Nova Scotia general election and was unsuccessful in the 1882 election.
