= Bernie Boudreau =

Canadian politician

The Honourable Bernie Boudreau PC KC

Leader of the Government in the Senate
- In office October 4, 1999 – January 8, 2001
- Prime Minister: Jean Chrétien
- Deputy: Dan Hays
- Whip: Léonce Mercier
- Preceded by: Alasdair Graham
- Succeeded by: Sharon Carstairs

Minister of State (Atlantic Canada Opportunities Agency)
- In office October 17, 2000 – January 8, 2001
- Prime Minister: Jean Chrétien
- Minister: Brian Tobin
- Preceded by: Position established
- Succeeded by: Robert Thibault

Minister of Finance of Nova Scotia
- In office June 11, 1993 – June 27, 1996
- Premier: John Savage
- Preceded by: Chuck MacNeil
- Succeeded by: Bill Gillis
Parliamentary constituencies
Canadian Senator from Nova Scotia
In office October 4, 1999 – October 26, 2000
Nominated by	Jean Chrétien
Appointed by	Roméo LeBlanc
Preceded by	Peggy Butts
Succeeded by	Gerard Phalen (2001)
Member of the Nova Scotia House of Assembly for Cape Breton The Lakes
In office September 6, 1988 – September 6, 1997
Preceded by	John Newell
Succeeded by	Helen MacDonald

Personal details
- Born: James Bernard Boudreau; July 25, 1944 (age 81) Sydney, Nova Scotia, Canada
- Party: Liberal
- Occupation: Politician

James Bernard Boudreau PC KC (born July 25, 1944) is a Canadian lawyer and politician.

== Provincial politics ==
Boudreau was elected to the Nova Scotia House of Assembly from Cape Breton The Lakes in the 1988 provincial election. He was re-elected in 1993, and was appointed to the Executive Council of Nova Scotia as Minister of Finance in the Liberal government of John Savage. From 1996, he served as Minister of Health. When Savage resigned in 1997, Boudreau entered the leadership race to succeed him, but was defeated by Russell MacLellan, prompting Boudreau to leave provincial politics.

== Federal politics ==
In October 1999, Prime Minister Jean Chrétien recommended Boudreau for appointment to the Senate of Canada, and to the Cabinet as Leader of the Government in the Senate, replacing Alasdair Graham who had been Nova Scotia's representative in the government since June 1997. It was also announced that Boudreau would be a candidate when the next federal election was held in order to help rebuild the federal Liberals in Nova Scotia, after the party lost all eleven seats in the 1997 federal election.

Prior to the 2000 election, Boudreau was appointed Minister of State for the Atlantic Canada Opportunities Agency. Boudreau resigned from the Senate in order to run in Dartmouth for a seat in the House of Commons of Canada. After a hotly contested campaign, he was defeated by incumbent New Democratic Party Member of Parliament Wendy Lill.

2000 Canadian federal election: Dartmouth—Cole Harbour
Party	Candidate	Votes	%	±%
New Democratic	Wendy Lill	13,585	36.28	+3.71
Liberal	Bernie Boudreau	12,408	33.14	+5.93
Progressive Conservative	Tom McInnis	8,085	21.59	-5.32
Alliance	Jordi Morgan	3,282	8.76	-2.99
Marxist–Leninist	Charles Spurr	86	0.23	
Total valid votes		37,446	100.00	
Change for the Canadian Alliance from 1997 are based on the results of its predecessor, the Reform Party.

26th Canadian Ministry (1993–2003) – Cabinet of Jean Chrétien
Cabinet posts (2)
Predecessor	Office	Successor
Alasdair Graham	Leader of the Government in the Senate; 1999–2000	Sharon Carstairs
	Minister of State (Atlantic Canada Opportunities Agency); 2000–2001	Robert Thibault
