= Peter John Nicholson =

Canadian politician

MLA for Victoria
- In office 1978 – March 6, 1980
- Preceded by: Maynard MacAskill
- Succeeded by: Fisher Hudson

Personal details
- Born: May 3, 1942 (age 83) Halifax, Nova Scotia
- Party: Nova Scotia Liberal Party
- Occupation: Consultant

Peter John M. Nicholson (born May 3, 1942) is a Canadian economist, former politician, and science policy expert. He represented the electoral district of Victoria in the Nova Scotia House of Assembly from 1978 to 1980, as a member of the Nova Scotia Liberal Party.

== Early life and education ==
Nicholson was born at Halifax in 1942, the son of former Nova Scotia MLA Peter M. Nicholson. He attended Dalhousie University and Stanford University and holds Bachelor of Science, Master of Science, and Doctor of Philosophy (Ph.D.) degrees.

== Personal life ==
In 1982, he married Penelope Jane Connolly.
