= John Malcolm Campbell =

Canadian politician

John M. Campbell

MLA for Victoria
- In office 1937–1949
- Preceded by: Frederick W. Baldwin
- Succeeded by: Carleton L. MacMillan

Personal details
- Born: July 25, 1874 Ingonish, Nova Scotia
- Died: May 16, 1951 (aged 76) Middleton, Nova Scotia
- Party: Nova Scotia Liberal Party

John Malcolm Campbell (July 25, 1874 – May 16, 1951) was a Canadian politician. He represented the electoral district of Victoria in the Nova Scotia House of Assembly from 1937 to 1949. He was a member of the Nova Scotia Liberal Party.

Campbell was born in 1874 at Ingonish, Nova Scotia. He married Carrie Giles. He was superintendent of St. Paul's Island from 1908–1919, and Sable Island from 1919–1921. Campbell entered provincial politics in the 1937 election, defeating Conservative incumbent Frederick W. Baldwin by 586 votes in the Victoria riding. He was re-elected in the 1941, and 1945 elections. He did not reoffer in the 1949 election. Campbell died at Middleton, Nova Scotia on May 16, 1951.
