= Donald Buchanan McLeod =

Canadian politician

Donald Buchanan McLeod (November 10, 1865 – August 25, 1943) was a merchant and political figure in Nova Scotia, Canada. He represented Victoria County in the Nova Scotia House of Assembly from 1925 to 1933 as a Liberal member.

He was born in North Shore, Cumberland County, Nova Scotia, the son of Roderick McLeod and Jane Buchanan. He was married twice: First to Christina MacDonald in 1896 and then to Rodena MacKinnon in 1929. McLeod was involved in the lobster packing business. He served as sergeant-at-arms for the Nova Scotia Legislature from 1933 to 1943. He died in Briton Cove, Cape Breton at the age of 77.
