= Breton Cove =

Community in Nova Scotia, Canada

Coordinates: 46°27′24.84″N 60°27′54.32″W

Breton Cove in Nova Scotia

Breton Cove is a small community in the Canadian province of Nova Scotia, located in Victoria County on Cape Breton Island.
