= John Newell (Canadian politician) =

Canadian politician

John A. Newell

MLA for Cape Breton The Lakes
- In office 1983–1988
- Preceded by: Ossie Fraser
- Succeeded by: Bernie Boudreau

Personal details
- Born: October 6, 1935 Sydney, Nova Scotia
- Died: May 29, 2025 (aged 89) Sydney, Nova Scotia
- Party: Progressive Conservative
- Occupation: Grocery store official

John Ainslie Newell (October 6, 1935 – May 29, 2025) is a former Canadian politician. He represented the electoral district of Cape Breton The Lakes in the Nova Scotia House of Assembly from 1983 to 1988. He was a Progressive Conservative.

Born in 1935 in Sydney, Nova Scotia, Newell served on the Cape Breton County Council from 1976 to 1982. He first attempted to enter provincial politics in the 1981 election, but was defeated by Liberal Ossie Fraser by 120 votes. Fraser died in October 1982 and Newell was elected the new MLA for the riding in a by-election on February 22, 1983. He was re-elected in the 1984 election but was defeated by Liberal Bernie Boudreau in the 1988 election.
