= Fisher Hudson =

Canadian politician (1920–1999)

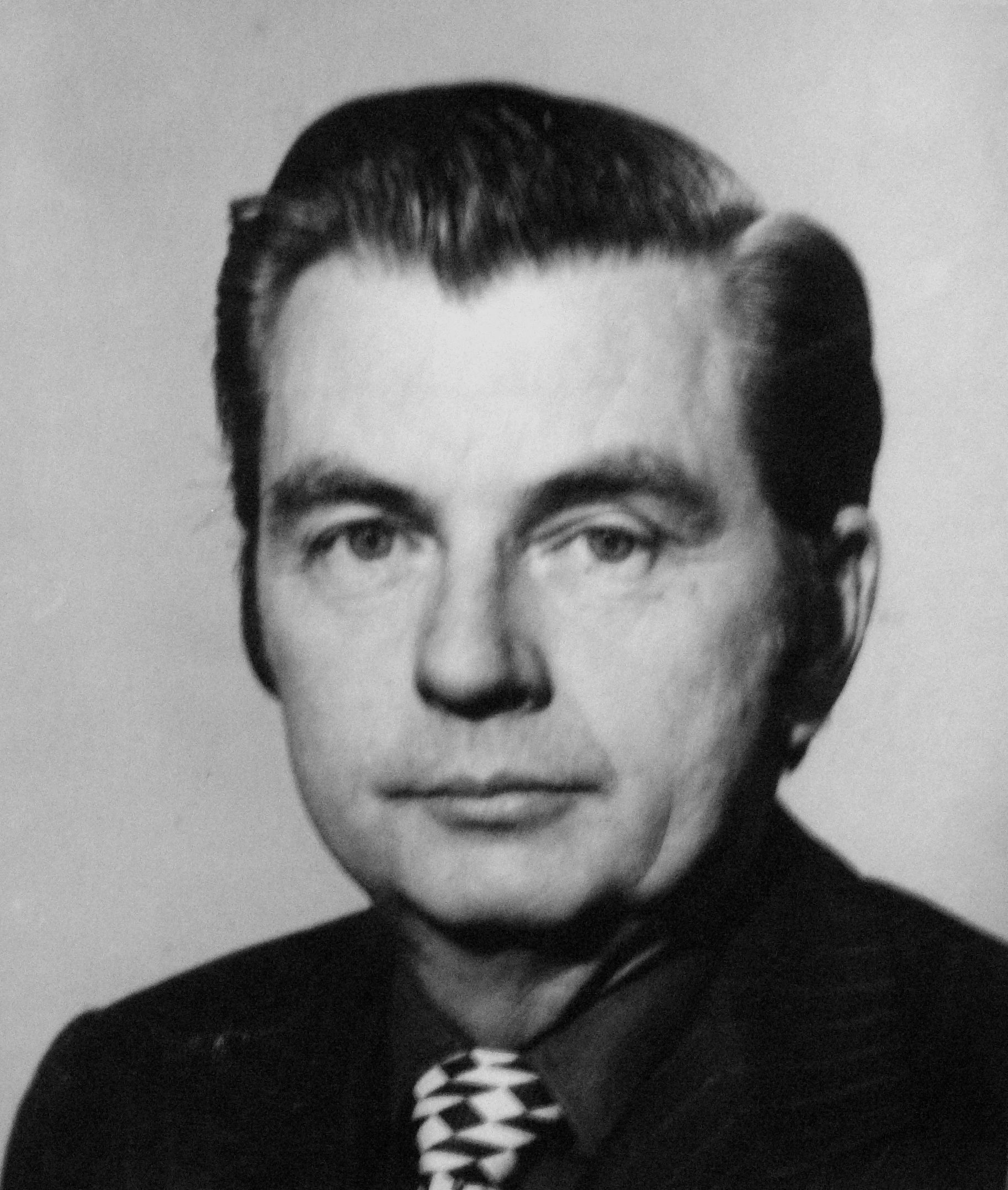
- Hudson, c. 1973

MLA for Victoria
- In office 1967–1974
- Preceded by: Carleton L. MacMillan
- Succeeded by: Maynard MacAskill
- In office 1980–1988
- Preceded by: Peter John Nicholson
- Succeeded by: Kennie MacAskill

Personal details
- Born: May 16, 1920 Country Harbour, Nova Scotia
- Died: April 15, 1999 (aged 78) Baddeck, Nova Scotia
- Party: Progressive Conservative
- Occupation: lawyer

Roy Fisher Hudson (May 16, 1920 – April 15, 1999) was a Canadian politician. He represented the electoral district of Victoria in the Nova Scotia House of Assembly from 1967 to 1974 and from 1980 to 1988. He was a member of the Nova Scotia Progressive Conservative Party.

Hudson was born in Country Harbour, Nova Scotia. He attended Mount Allison University and Dalhousie University, earning a Bachelor of Laws degree. In 1946, he married Noreen Edith Ward. He died on April 15, 1999, at his home in Baddeck, Nova Scotia.
