= Cape Breton The Lakes =

Former provincial electoral district in Nova Scotia, Canada

Nova Scotia electoral district

Defunct provincial electoral district
- Legislature: Nova Scotia House of Assembly
- District created: 1978
- District abolished: 2003
- Last contested: 1999

Cape Breton The Lakes was a provincial electoral district in Nova Scotia, Canada, that elected one member of the Nova Scotia House of Assembly.

It was created in 1978 out of areas which were formerly included in the Cape Breton North, Cape Breton South, and Cape Breton West. In 2003, it was reallocated to Victoria-The Lakes, Cape Breton South, Cape Breton North, and Cape Breton West.

== Members of the Legislative Assembly ==
Cape Breton The Lakes
Legislature	Years	Member	Party
District created from Cape Breton North (1933–1978), Cape Breton South (1933–2013), and Cape Breton West (1933–2013)
52nd	1978–1981	Ossie Fraser	Liberal
53rd	1981–1983	Ossie Fraser	Liberal
53rd	1983–1984	John Newell	Progressive Conservative
54th	1984–1988	John Newell	Progressive Conservative
55th	1988–1993	Bernie Boudreau	Liberal
56th	1993–1997	Bernie Boudreau	Liberal
56th	1997–1998	Helen MacDonald	New Democratic
57th	1998–1999	Helen MacDonald	New Democratic
58th	1999–2003	Brian Boudreau	Liberal
District dissolved into Victoria-The Lakes (2003–Present), Cape Breton South (1933–2013), Cape Breton North (1933–2013), and Cape Breton West (1933–2013)

== Election results ==
=== 1999 ===
1999 Nova Scotia general election
Party	Candidate	Votes	%	±%
Liberal	Brian Boudreau	3,715	43.70%	1.40%
New Democratic	Helen MacDonald	3,614	42.51%	-9.67%
Progressive Conservative	Ken Langley	1,173	13.80%	8.26%
Total		8,502	–	
Source(s) Source: Nova Scotia Legislature (2024). "Electoral History for Cape Breton The Lakes" (PDF). nslegislature.ca. Nova Scotia, Chief Electoral Officer (1999). Returns of the General Election for the House of Assembly, Thirty-Fifth General Election (Report). Elections Nova Scotia.

=== 1998 ===
1998 Nova Scotia general election
Party	Candidate	Votes	%	±%
New Democratic	Helen MacDonald	4,573	52.17%	2.99%
Liberal	Allan Henderson	3,707	42.29%	1.97%
Progressive Conservative	Rollie Clarke	485	5.53%	-4.96%
Total		8,765	–	
Source(s) Source: Nova Scotia Legislature (2024). "Electoral History for Cape Breton The Lakes" (PDF). nslegislature.ca.

=== 1997 by-election ===
Nova Scotia provincial by-election, 1997-11-04
Party	Candidate	Votes	%	±%
New Democratic	Helen MacDonald	3,727	49.19%	34.88%
Liberal	Allan Henderson	3,055	40.32%	-31.58%
Progressive Conservative	Rollie Clarke	795	10.49%	-3.30%
Total		7,577	–	
Source(s) Source: Nova Scotia Legislature (2024). "Electoral History for Cape Breton The Lakes" (PDF). nslegislature.ca. By-Election Returns 1997 (PDF) (Report). Elections Nova Scotia. 1997. Archived from the original (PDF) on August 7, 2021.

=== 1993 ===
1993 Nova Scotia general election
Party	Candidate	Votes	%	±%
Liberal	Bernie Boudreau	6,591	71.90%	26.53%
New Democratic	Helen MacDonald	1,312	14.31%	-4.80%
Progressive Conservative	Lauchie G. Leslie	1,264	13.79%	-21.73%
Total		9,167	–	
Source(s) Source: Nova Scotia Legislature (2024). "Electoral History for Cape Breton The Lakes" (PDF). nslegislature.ca. Nova Scotia, Chief Electoral Officer (1993). Returns of the General Election for the House of Assembly, Thirty-Third General Election (PDF) (Report). Queen's Printer. Archived from the original (PDF) on June 18, 2018.

=== 1988 ===
1988 Nova Scotia general election
Party	Candidate	Votes	%	±%
Liberal	Bernie Boudreau	4,192	45.37%	7.62%
Progressive Conservative	John Newell	3,282	35.52%	-15.77%
New Democratic	Helen MacDonald	1,766	19.11%	9.92%
Total		9,240	–	
Source(s) Source: Nova Scotia Legislature (2024). "Electoral History for Cape Breton The Lakes" (PDF). nslegislature.ca. Nova Scotia, Chief Electoral Officer (1988). Returns of the General Election for the House of Assembly, Thirty-Second General Election (PDF) (Report). Queen's Printer. Archived from the original (PDF) on July 7, 2018.

=== 1984 ===
1984 Nova Scotia general election
Party	Candidate	Votes	%	±%
Progressive Conservative	John Newell	4,535	51.29%	13.01%
Liberal	John Coady	3,338	37.75%	0.82%
New Democratic	Richard Fogarty	813	9.19%	-8.04%
Labour	Mary Strickland	156	1.76%	-5.80%
Total		8,842	–	
Source(s) Source: Nova Scotia Legislature (2024). "Electoral History for Cape Breton The Lakes" (PDF). nslegislature.ca. Nova Scotia, Chief Electoral Officer (1984). Returns of the General Election for the House of Assembly, Thirty-First General Election (PDF) (Report). Queen's Printer. Archived from the original (PDF) on July 31, 2017.

=== 1983 by-election ===
Nova Scotia provincial by-election, 1983-02-23
Party	Candidate	Votes	%	±%
Progressive Conservative	John Newell	3,190	38.28%	-3.23%
Liberal	John Coady	3,078	36.93%	-6.08%
New Democratic	Gerald Yetman	1,436	17.23%	1.75%
Labour	Gary Mosher	630	7.56%	–
Total		8,334	–	
Source(s) Source: Nova Scotia Legislature (2024). "Electoral History for Cape Breton The Lakes" (PDF). nslegislature.ca.

=== 1981 ===
1981 Nova Scotia general election
Party	Candidate	Votes	%	±%
Liberal	Ossie Fraser	3,436	43.01%	-3.25%
Progressive Conservative	John Newell	3,316	41.51%	6.32%
New Democratic	Douglas D. MacDonald	1,237	15.48%	-3.07%
Total		7,989	–	
Source(s) Source: Nova Scotia Legislature (2024). "Electoral History for Cape Breton The Lakes" (PDF). nslegislature.ca. Nova Scotia, Chief Electoral Officer (1981). Returns of the General Election for the House of Assembly, Thirtieth General Election (PDF) (Report). Queen's Printer. Archived from the original (PDF) on July 31, 2017.

=== 1978 ===
1978 Nova Scotia general election
Party	Candidate	Votes	%	±%
Liberal	Ossie Fraser	3,473	46.26%	–
Progressive Conservative	Jim MacDonald	2,642	35.19%	–
New Democratic	Irene LeBlanc	1,393	18.55%	–
Total		7,508	–	
Source(s) Source: Nova Scotia Legislature (2024). "Electoral History for Cape Breton The Lakes" (PDF). nslegislature.ca. Nova Scotia, Chief Electoral Officer (1978). Returns of the General Election for the House of Assembly, Twenty-Ninth General Election (PDF) (Report). Queen's Printer. Archived from the original (PDF) on June 18, 2018.

== See also ==
- List of Nova Scotia provincial electoral districts
- Canadian provincial electoral districts
