= Helen MacDonald (Nova Scotia politician) =

Canadian politician

Leader of the Nova Scotia New Democratic Party
- In office July 17, 2000 – April 24, 2001
- Preceded by: Robert Chisholm
- Succeeded by: Darrell Dexter

MLA for Cape Breton The Lakes
- In office 1997–1999
- Preceded by: Bernie Boudreau
- Succeeded by: Brian Boudreau

Personal details
- Born: 1943 (age 82–83) New Waterford, Nova Scotia
- Party: NDP
- Occupation: teacher, administrator

Helen MacDonald is a Canadian politician. She represented the electoral district of Cape Breton The Lakes in the Nova Scotia House of Assembly from 1997 to 1999. She was a member of the Nova Scotia New Democratic Party.

== Early life and career ==
Born in New Waterford, Nova Scotia, MacDonald was educated at the Nova Scotia Normal College and St. Francis Xavier University. She was a teacher and education administrator for 37 years.

== Political career ==
A longtime NDP supporter, MacDonald first attempted to enter provincial politics in the 1988 election, finishing third in the Cape Breton-The Lakes riding behind Liberal Bernie Boudreau and Progressive Conservative incumbent John Newell. She ran again in the 1993 election, losing to Boudreau by more than 5200 votes, while edging out the Progressive Conservative candidate to finish second.

Following Boudreau's resignation as MLA, MacDonald ran in the by-election to replace him. On November 4, 1997, MacDonald won the by-election by 672 votes, becoming the first provincial New Democrat elected from Cape Breton since 1978. MacDonald was also the first woman MLA elected in Cape Breton. She was re-elected by 866 votes in the 1998 election, and served as caucus chairwoman and gaming critic. She was defeated when she ran for re-election in 1999, losing to Liberal Brian Boudreau by 101 votes.

On March 22, 2000, MacDonald announced that she was entering the leadership election to replace Robert Chisholm as leader of the Nova Scotia New Democrats. At the leadership convention on July 15, MacDonald trailed MLA Kevin Deveaux by four votes after the second ballot, but with the support of third place candidate Maureen MacDonald, she overtook Deveaux on the third ballot to win the leadership. MacDonald officially took over as leader on July 17.

In October 2000, MacDonald announced that she would run in the Cape Breton North riding when a by-election was held to replace former Liberal premier Russell MacLellan. On January 14, 2001, she was nominated to run as the NDP candidate for the riding. On March 6, 2001, MacDonald finished third in the by-election, losing to Progressive Conservative Cecil Clarke. Following the loss, MacDonald said she would continue to serve as leader, but resigned on April 24, after she learned that six members of the NDP caucus wanted to meet with her to ask for her resignation. She was succeeded by Darrell Dexter.

== Personal life ==
MacDonald and her husband John reside in Bras d'Or, Nova Scotia. They have six children.
