= Keith Bain =

Canadian politician

Speaker of the House of Assembly of Nova Scotia
- In office September 24, 2021 – October 12, 2023
- Preceded by: Kevin Murphy
- Succeeded by: Karla MacFarlane

Member of the Nova Scotia House of Assembly for Victoria-The Lakes
- In office May 30, 2017 – October 27, 2024
- Preceded by: Pam Eyking
- Succeeded by: Dianne Timmins
- In office June 13, 2006 – October 8, 2013
- Preceded by: Gerald Sampson
- Succeeded by: Pam Eyking

Personal details
- Born: 24 October 1952 (age 73)
- Party: Progressive Conservative
- Occupation: businessman, school trustee

Keith Leslie Bain (born October 24, 1952) is a Canadian politician. He represented the electoral district of Victoria-The Lakes in the Nova Scotia House of Assembly from 2006 to 2013 as a member of the Progressive Conservatives.

Bain first ran for provincial politics in the 2003 election, but was defeated by Liberal Gerald Sampson. Bain was elected in the 2006 provincial election, defeating Sampson by over 700 votes. He was re-elected in the 2009 election. He was defeated by Liberal Pam Eyking when he ran for re-election in 2013. In May 2016, Bain was again nominated as the riding's Progressive Conservative candidate for the 2017 Nova Scotia general election. He won on election night in a re-match with Eyking.

On September 24, 2021, Bain was elected as Speaker of the Nova Scotia House of Assembly.
