= John Gillis Morrison =

Canadian politician

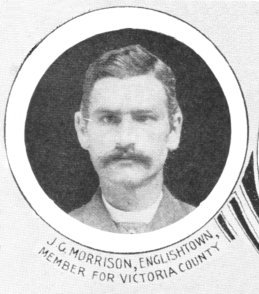
J. G. Morrison

John Gillis Morrison (November 17, 1863 – April 8, 1917) was a merchant and political figure in Nova Scotia, Canada. He represented Victoria County in the Nova Scotia House of Assembly from 1894 to 1909 and from 1916 to his death in 1917 as a Liberal member.

He was born in Englishtown, Nova Scotia. Morrison married Mary E. MacDonald. He was mainly involved in the fishing trade and also served as an inspector of fisheries. He served on the municipal council from 1892 to 1894. He died in hospital in Halifax at the age of 53.
