= George Archibald (politician) =

Canadian politician

The Honourable George Archibald ECNS

MLA for Kings North
- In office 1984–1999
- Preceded by: Edward Twohig
- Succeeded by: Mark Parent

Minister of Transportation and Communications

Personal details
- Born: 1946 (age 79–80)
- Party: Progressive Conservative

George Archibald is a Canadian politician. He represented the constituency of Kings North in the Nova Scotia House of Assembly from 1984 to 1999. He sat as a member of the Progressive Conservative Party.

Archibald was first elected in 1984, was re-elected in 1988, 1993 and 1998. He did not re-offer in 1999.

Archibald served in the Executive Council of Nova Scotia as Minister of Transportation, and Minister of Agriculture.
