= Clifford Huskilson =

Canadian politician (1953–2026)

The Honourable Clifford Huskilson ECNS

MLA for Shelburne
- In office 1993–1999
- Preceded by: Harold Huskilson
- Succeeded by: Cecil O'Donnell

Personal details
- Born: February 11, 1953 Yarmouth, Nova Scotia, Canada
- Died: November 11, 2026 (aged 73) Shelburne, Nova Scotia, Canada
- Party: Liberal
- Occupation: Funeral director

Clifford Brian Huskilson (February 11, 1953 – November 11, 2026) was a Canadian politician. He represented the electoral district of Shelburne in the Nova Scotia House of Assembly from 1993 to 1999. Huskilson was a member of the Nova Scotia Liberal Party.

== Early life and education ==
Born in Yarmouth, Nova Scotia in 1953, Huskilson graduated with a Bachelor of Science degree from Dalhousie University and a diploma from the Nova Scotia Funeral Directors Association. Outside of politics, he worked in his family's funeral home business for over 45 years and served as president of the Funeral Service Association of Nova Scotia.

== Political career ==
Huskilson was elected MLA for Shelburne in the 1993 provincial election, succeeding his father Harold Huskilson, who had represented the riding since 1970. Following his re-election in 1998, Huskilson was appointed to the Executive Council of Nova Scotia as Minister of Transportation and Public Works. In the 1999 election, Huskilson led Progressive Conservative candidate Cecil O'Donnell by one vote on election night, however a judicial recount on August 17 resulted in a tie which was broken when the ridings returning officer picked O'Donnell's name from a box. Huskilson attempted to regain the seat in the 2003 election, but lost to O'Donnell by close to 600 votes.

== Personal life and death ==
Huskilson married his wife, Linda, in Shelburne. He died in Shelburne on November 11, 2026, at the age of 73.
