= 1998 Nova Scotia general election =

Canadian provincial election

← 1993	March 24, 1998	1999 →

52 seats of the Nova Scotia House of Assembly 27 seats needed for a majority
- Turnout: 69.47% ▼5.92pp
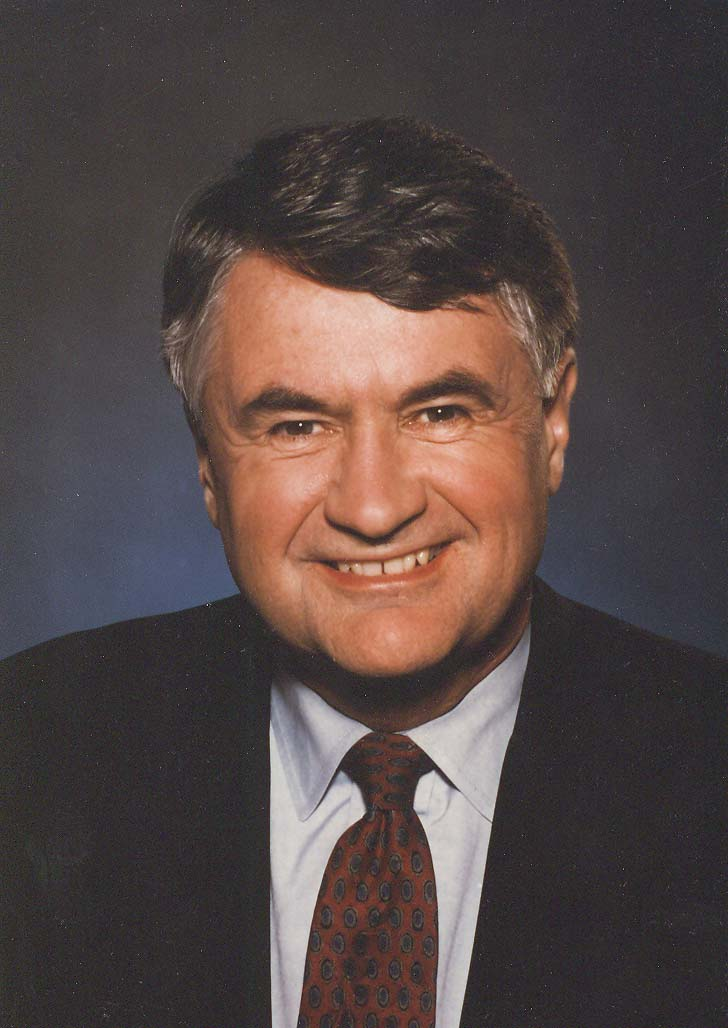

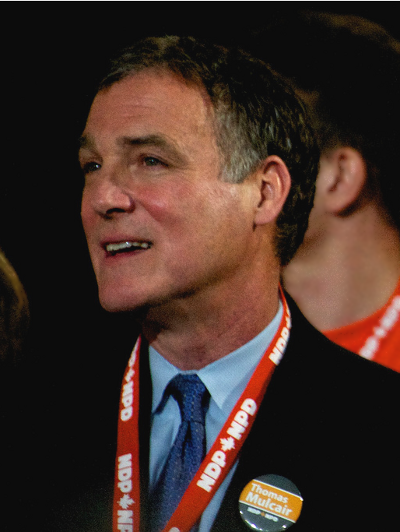

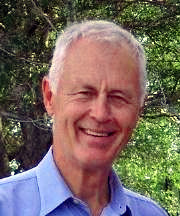
	First party	Second party	Third party
Leader	Russell MacLellan	Robert Chisholm	John Hamm
Party	Liberal	New Democratic	Progressive Conservative
Leader since	July 12, 1997	March 30, 1996	October 28, 1995
Leader's seat	Cape Breton North	Halifax Atlantic	Pictou Centre
Last election	40	3	9
Seats won	19	19	14
Seat change	▼21	▲16	▲5
Popular vote	158,380	155,361	133,540
Percentage	35.10%	34.43%	29.60%
Swing	▼13.86pp	▲16.71pp	▼1.49pp
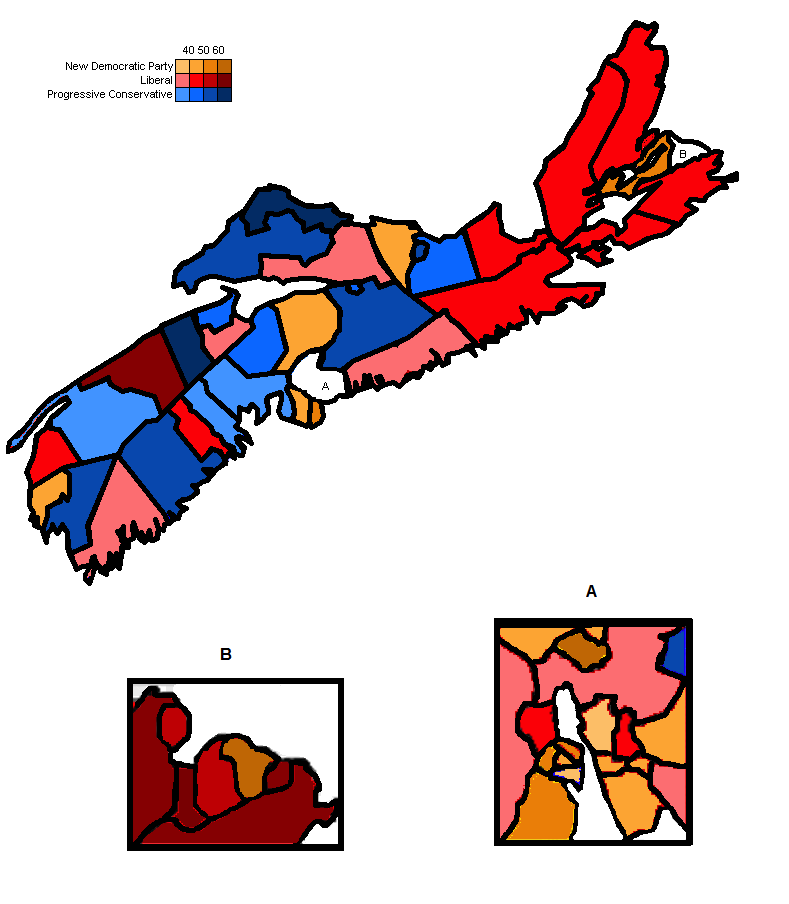
- Riding map of Nova Scotia showing winning parties
Premier before election
Russell MacLellan
Liberal
Premier after election
Russell MacLellan
Liberal

The 1998 Nova Scotia general election was held on March 24, 1998, to elect members of the 57th House of Assembly of the province of Nova Scotia, Canada. The Liberal party and the New Democratic Party tied in the seat count, with 19 each, while the Progressive Conservatives won 14 seats. The Liberals went on to form a minority government with the support of the Progressive Conservatives.

== Background ==
Liberal Premier John Savage was elected in a landslide in 1993. The Liberals inherited a $471-million deficit, and launched an austerity program which cut the province's health and education systems. On April 1, 1997, the provincial government imposed a 15% Harmonized Sales Tax (HST) which merged the Provincial Sales Tax (PST) and the Goods and Services Tax (GST). This shift angered some Nova Scotians who now had to pay taxes on things that had previously been exempted, such as home heating fuel. Savage also implemented an unpopular highway toll. Liberal party infighting eventually resulted in Savage's resignation in July 1997. Russell MacLellan became Premier of Nova Scotia on July 18, 1997.

== Campaign ==
The governing Liberals were desperate to distance themselves from the Savage government which was viewed as deeply unpopular. New leader, Russell MacLellan, was made the focus of the campaign with all Liberal candidates signs displaying the phrase, "the MacLellan Liberals."

During a televised debate on March 5, 1998, MacLellan stumbled badly when Progressive Conservative Leader John Hamm asked if he would resign if he failed to bring in a balanced budget. Instead of responding, MacLellan stared straight ahead and did not speak for seven seconds. MacLellan blamed the pause on rigid debate rules. This moment marked a turning point in a race that saw the Liberals barely retain power.

== Opinion polls ==
Evolution of voting intentions at provincial level
Polling firm	Last day of survey	Source	LANS	NSNDP	PCNS	Other	ME	Sample
Election 1998	March 24, 1998		35.10	34.43	29.60	0.29		
Omnifacts	January 1994		60	24	16	—	—	—
Election 1993	May 25, 1993		48.96	17.72	31.09	1.53		

== Results ==
=== Results by party ===
↓
19	19	14
Liberal	New Democratic	Progressive Conservative

Official results
Party	Party leader	# of candidates	Seats				Popular vote		
Party	Party leader	# of candidates	1993	Dissolution	Elected	Change	#	%	Change (pp)
Liberal	Russell MacLellan	52	40	35	19	-21	158,380	35.10%	-13.86%
New Democratic	Robert Chisholm	52	3	4	19	+16	155,361	34.43%	+16.71%
Progressive Conservative	John Hamm	52	9	9	14	+5	133,540	29.60%	-1.49%
Independent		7	0	0	0	0	1,325	0.29%	-0.90%
Vacant				2					
Total valid votes							448,606	99.43%	+0.13%
Blank and invalid ballots							2,578	0.57%	-0.13%
Total		163	52	52	52	–	451,184	100.00%	–
Registered voters / turnout							649,536	69.47%	-5.92%

Popular vote
Liberal	35.10%
New Democratic	34.43%
PC	29.60%
Independent	0.29%

Seats summary
Liberal	36.54%
New Democratic	36.54%
PC	26.92%

=== Results by region ===
Party name		HRM	C.B.	Valley	S. Shore	Fundy	Central	Total
Parties winning seats in the legislature:
Liberal	Seats:	4	7	3	2	1	2	19
Liberal	Popular vote:	34.46%	44.91%	32.54%	35.30%	29.31%	31.42%	35.34%
New Democratic Party	Seats:	13	3	-	1	1	1	19
New Democratic Party	Popular vote:	43.94%	38.02%	25.44%	28.09%	25.57%	27.41%	34.61%
Progressive Conservative	Seats:	-	-	4	4	4	2	14
Progressive Conservative	Popular vote:	21.47%	16.16%	41.66%	36.46%	44.98%	41.17%	29.75%
Parties not winning seats in the legislature:
Independents	Popular vote:	0.13%	0.91%	0.36%	0.15%	0.14%	-	0.30%
Total seats:		17	10	7	7	6	5	52

== Retiring incumbents ==
Liberal

- Jay Abbass, Halifax Chebucto
- Guy Brown, Cumberland South
- Bob Carruthers, Hants East
- Bill Gillis, Antigonish
- Charles MacArthur, Inverness
- John MacEachern, Cape Breton East
- Russell MacNeil, Cape Breton Centre
- Earle Rafuse, Annapolis
- Dennis Richards, Cole Harbour-Eastern Passage
- John Savage, Dartmouth South

Progressive Conservative

- Donald P. McInnes, Pictou West

== Nominated candidates ==
Legend
bold denotes party leader
† denotes an incumbent who is not running for re-election or was defeated in nomination contest

=== Valley ===
Electoral district	Candidates				Incumbent
Electoral district	Liberal	PC	NDP	Independent	Incumbent
Annapolis	Laurie Montgomery; 3,448; 36.96%	Basil Stewart; 3,198; 34.28%	John Kinsella; 2,468; 26.46%	Bob Mann; 215; 2.30%	Earle Rafuse †
Clare	Wayne Gaudet; 2,950; 47.28%	Guy LeBlanc; 2,578; 41.32%	Vanessa Paddock; 711; 11.40%		Wayne Gaudet
Digby—Annapolis	John Drish; 2,232; 33.71%	Gordon Balser; 2,465; 37.22%	Steve Downes; 1,925; 29.07%		Joseph H. Casey†
Hants West	Debbi Bowes; 2,596; 27.35%	Ron Russell; 4,507; 47.48%	Dana Harvey; 2,390; 25.18%		Ron Russell
Kings North	Jennifer Foster; 2,457; 27.09%	George Archibald; 3,760; 41.45%	Neil H. McNeil; 2,854; 31.46%		George Archibald
Kings South	Robbie Harrison; 3,650; 36.46%	David Morse; 3,069; 30.65%	Mary DeWolfe; 3,293; 32.89%		Robbie Harrison
Kings West	Baden Thurber; 1,684; 20.60%	George Moody; 5,075; 62.09%	Jacquie DeMestral; 1,414; 17.30%		George Moody

=== South Shore ===
Electoral district	Candidates				Incumbent
Electoral district	Liberal	PC	NDP	Independent	Incumbent
Argyle	Allister Surette; 1,891; 33.47%	Neil LeBlanc; 3,028; 53.59%	Diane E. Cromwell; 651; 11.52%	Oscar Harris; 80; 1.42%	Allister Surette
Chester—St. Margaret's	Jim Barkhouse; 3,153; 34.10%	Hinrich Bitter-Suermann; 3,256; 35.22%	Doris Maley; 2,837; 30.68%		Jim Barkhouse
Lunenburg	Lila O'Connor; 3,099; 34.62%	Michael Baker; 3,231; 36.10%	Marilyn B. Crook; 2,621; 29.28%		Lila O'Connor
Lunenburg West	Don Downe; 4,364; 47.95%	Lou Centa; 2,027; 22.27%	Eric Hustvedt; 2,711; 29.78%		Don Downe
Queens	Tery Doucette; 2,072; 31.42%	John Leefe; 3,582; 54.32%	Basil L. Giffin; 940; 14.26%		John Leefe
Shelburne	Clifford Huskilson; 3,144; 38.57%	Cecil O'Donnell; 2,835; 34.78%	Derek Jones; 2,173; 26.66%		Clifford Huskilson
Yarmouth	Richie Hubbard; 2,212; 25.22%	Alex McIntosh; 2,629; 29.97%	John Deveau; 3,931; 44.81%		Richie Hubbard

=== Fundy-Northeast ===
Electoral district	Candidates				Incumbent
Electoral district	Liberal	PC	NDP	Independent	Incumbent
Colchester—Musquodoboit Valley	Dick Steeves; 1,587; 18.31%	Brooke Taylor; 5,122; 59.08%	Jim Harpell; 1,960; 22.61%		Brooke Taylor
Colchester North	Ed Lorraine; 3,301; 39.13%	Andy Williamson; 2,511; 29.77%	Janet Maybee; 2,623; 31.10%		Ed Lorraine
Cumberland North	Russell Scott; 2,438; 27.89%	Ernie Fage; 5,451; 62.35%	Peter Stewart; 854; 9.77%		Ernie Fage
Cumberland South	Mike Uberoi; 2,153; 26.81%	Murray Scott; 4,714; 58.69%	Sandy Graham; 1,089; 13.56%	James MacLeod; 76; 0.95%	Guy Brown †
Hants East	Jim W. Smith; 3,377; 35.32%	Lawrin Armstrong; 2,010; 21.02%	John MacDonell; 4,175; 43.66%		Bob Carruthers †
Truro—Bible Hill	Eleanor Norrie; 2,560; 27.94%	Jamie Muir; 3,852; 42.03%	Ibel Scammell; 2,752; 30.03%		Eleanor Norrie

=== Central Halifax ===
Electoral district	Candidates				Incumbent
Electoral district	Liberal	PC	NDP	Independent	Incumbent
Halifax Bedford Basin	Gerry Fogarty; 4,246; 40.10%	Michael Maddalena; 2,530; 23.89%	Errol Gaum; 3,813; 36.01%		Gerry Fogarty
Halifax Chebucto	Kenzie MacKinnon; 3,165; 35.51%	Sean Phillips; 1,590; 17.84%	Howard Epstein; 4,158; 46.65%		Jay Abbass †
Halifax Citadel	Ed Kinley; 4,377; 39.53%	Tara Erskine; 2,175; 19.64%	Peter Delefes; 4,414; 39.87%	Art Canning; 106; 0.96%	Ed Kinley
Halifax Fairview	Bob Britton; 2,597; 30.03%	Brian Nash; 1,402; 16.21%	Eileen O'Connell; 4,649; 53.76%		Eileen O'Connell
Halifax Needham	Gerry O'Malley; 2,506; 30.31%	Artho Kartsaklis; 924; 11.18%	Maureen MacDonald; 4,837; 58.51%		Gerry O'Malley

=== Suburban Halifax ===
Electoral district	Candidates				Incumbent
Electoral district	Liberal	PC	NDP	Independent	Incumbent
Bedford—Fall River	Francene Cosman; 4,205; 37.58%	Peter Christie; 3,892; 34.79%	Marvin Silver; 3,091; 27.63%		Francene Cosman
Halifax Atlantic	Darren Watts; 2,818; 29.31%	Jeff Campbell; 1,340; 13.94%	**Robert Chisholm**; 5,364; 55.79%	Golda M. Redden; 93; 0.97%	Robert Chisholm
Sackville—Beaver Bank	Bill MacDonald; 3,128; 33.16%	Stephen Taylor; 2,485; 26.34%	Rosemary Godin; 3,821; 40.50%		Bill MacDonald
Sackville—Cobequid	Jack Brill; 2,131; 22.61%	Rob Batherson; 1,383; 14.68%	John Holm; 5,909; 62.71%		John Holm
Timberlea—Prospect	Bruce Holland; 3,308; 33.34%	Tom Robertson; 1,852; 18.67%	Bill Estabrooks; 4,762; 47.99%		Bruce Holland

=== Dartmouth/Cole Harbour/Eastern Shore ===
Electoral district	Candidates				Incumbent
Electoral district	Liberal	PC	NDP	Independent	Incumbent
Cole Harbour—Eastern Passage	Randy Anstey; 3,303; 34.25%	Linda DeGrace; 1,931; 20.02%	Kevin Deveaux; 4,411; 45.73%		Dennis Richards †
Dartmouth—Cole Harbour	Alan Mitchell; 2,986; 33.98%	Michael L. MacDonald; 2,084; 23.72%	Darrell Dexter; 3,717; 42.30%		Alan Mitchell
Dartmouth East	Jim Smith; 3,326; 40.92%	Ralph Hawley; 1,849; 22.75%	Viola Huntington; 2,954; 36.34%		Jim Smith
Dartmouth North	Gloria McClusky; 2,575; 33.87%	Mike Brownlow; 2,003; 26.35%	Jerry Pye; 3,024; 39.78%		Vacant
Dartmouth South	Bruce Hetherington; 3,164; 35.40%	Allan Billard; 2,099; 23.48%	Don Chard; 3,676; 41.12%		John Savage †
Eastern Shore	Keith Colwell; 3,299; 38.49%	Greg Brown; 2,472; 28.84%	Darren Richard; 2,801; 32.68%		Keith Colwell
Preston	Wayne Adams; 1,548; 37.45%	Ross D. Isenor; 809; 19.57%	Yvonne Atwell; 1,777; 42.99%		Wayne Adams

=== Central Nova ===
Electoral district	Candidates				Incumbent
Electoral district	Liberal	PC	NDP	Independent	Incumbent
Antigonish	Hyland Fraser; 4,649; 41.55%	Andrew MacNeil; 3,554; 31.76%	Maurice Smith; 2,986; 26.69%		Bill Gillis †
Guysborough—Port Hawkesbury	Ray White; 3,438; 42.81%	Ron Chisholm; 2,717; 33.83%	Wendy Panagopoulos; 1,876; 23.36%		Ray White
Pictou Centre	Roseanne Skoke; 2,114; 23.68%	**John Hamm**; 5,037; 56.42%	Judy Hughes; 1,776; 19.89%		John Hamm
Pictou East	Wayne Fraser; 2,208; 26.52%	James DeWolfe; 3,816; 45.83%	David MacKenzie; 2,302; 27.65%		Wayne Fraser
Pictou West	Rob McDowell; 1,633; 19.89%	Luke Young; 3,273; 39.86%	Charlie Parker; 3,306; 40.26%		Donald P. McInnes†

=== Cape Breton ===
Electoral district	Candidates				Incumbent
Electoral district	Liberal	PC	NDP	Independent	Incumbent
Cape Breton Centre	Steve Drake; 2,435; 28.61%	Julien Frison; 576; 6.77%	Frank Corbett; 5,499; 64.62%		Russell MacNeil †
Cape Breton East	Clarence Routledge; 2,859; 30.06%	Henry Boutillier; 1,651; 17.36%	Reeves Matheson; 5,002; 52.59%		John MacEachern †
Cape Breton North	**Russell MacLellan**; 4,666; 50.13%	Murray Johnston; 1,853; 19.91%	Archie MacKinnon; 2,789; 29.96%		Russell MacLellan
Cape Breton Nova	Paul MacEwan; 3,944; 53.98%	Walter Hagen; 312; 4.27%	Lou Surette; 3,050; 41.75%		Paul MacEwan
Cape Breton South	Manning MacDonald; 5,118; 60.30%	Anna Steele; 861; 10.14%	Ed Murphy; 2,508; 29.55%		Manning MacDonald
Cape Breton—The Lakes	Allan Henderson; 3,707; 42.29%	Rollie Clarke; 485; 5.53%	Helen MacDonald; 4,573; 52.17%		Helen MacDonald
Cape Breton West	Russell MacKinnon; 4,528; 44.05%	Alfie MacLeod; 2,818; 27.42%	Brian Slaney; 2,933; 28.53%		Alfie MacLeod
Inverness	Charlie MacDonald; 4,396; 47.83%	Randy MacDonald; 1,951; 21.23%	Maria Coady; 2,274; 24.74%	Ed MacDonald; 569; 6.19%	Charles MacArthur †
Richmond	Michel Samson; 3,230; 48.40%	Frank Sutherland; 1,392; 20.86%	Wilma Conrod; 2,051; 30.74%		Vacant
Victoria	Kennie MacAskill; 2,405; 48.08%	Dan Chiasson; 1,524; 30.47%	Ruth Schneider; 887; 17.73%	Stemer MacLeod; 186; 3.72%	Kennie MacAskill
