= Kennie MacAskill =

Canadian politician

The Honourable Kennie MacAskill ECNS

MLA for Victoria
- In office 1988–2003
- Preceded by: Fisher Hudson
- Succeeded by: riding dissolved

Personal details
- Born: August 12, 1933 (age 92) Englishtown, Nova Scotia
- Party: Liberal

Kenneth MacAskill (born August 12, 1933) is a Canadian politician. He represented the electoral district of Victoria in the Nova Scotia House of Assembly from 1988 to 2003. He was a member of the Nova Scotia Liberal Party.

Born in 1933, MacAskill is a graduate of the Nova Scotia Institute of Technology where he obtained an interprovincial plumbing certificate. For over 20 years, he operated his own plumbing and heating business in Englishtown, Nova Scotia. MacAskill entered provincial politics in 1988, defeating Progressive Conservative incumbent Fisher Hudson to become the MLA for Victoria. He was re-elected in 1993 and served as a backbencher in John Savage's government. On July 18, 1997, MacAskill was appointed to the Executive Council of Nova Scotia as Minister of Natural Resources. Following his re-election in the 1998 election, MacAskill retained the Natural Resources portfolio. He was re-elected to a fourth term as MLA in the 1999 election, and did not seek re-election in 2003.
