= 1999 Nova Scotia general election =

Canadian provincial election

- July 27, 1999

52 seats of the Nova Scotia House of Assembly 27 seats were needed for a majority
- Turnout: 68.12% ▼1.35pp
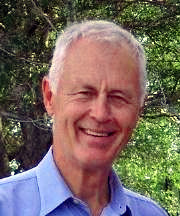

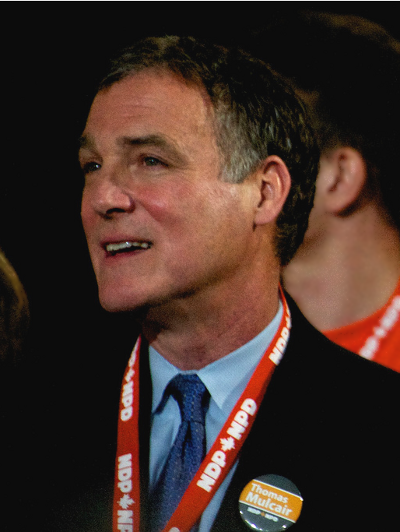

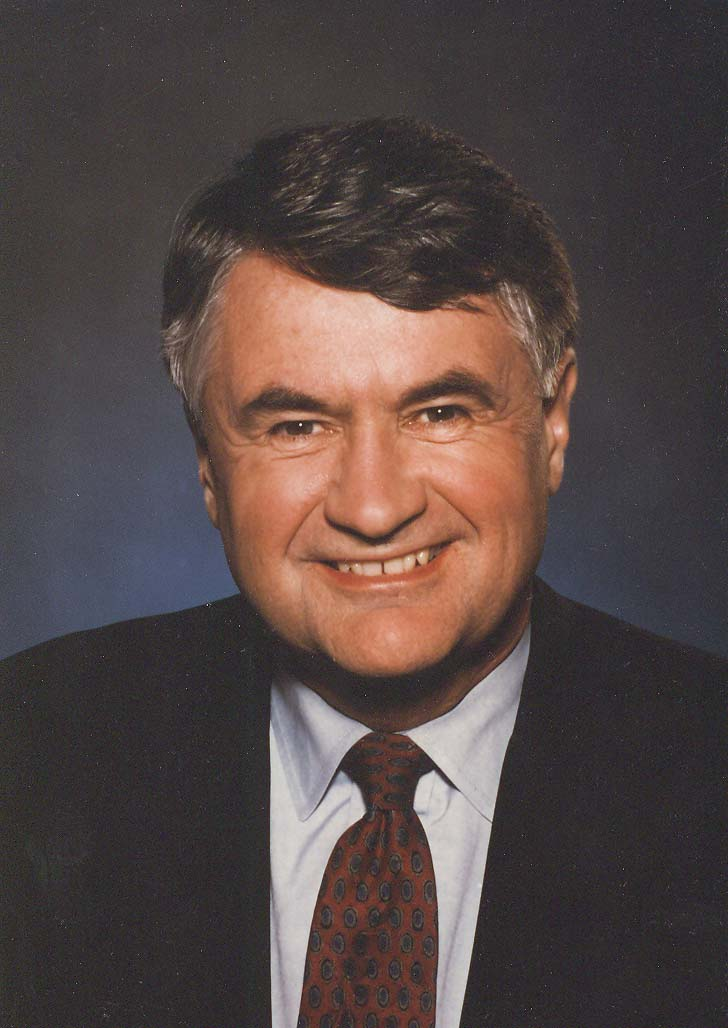
	First party	Second party	Third party
Leader	John Hamm	Robert Chisholm	Russell MacLellan
Party	Progressive Conservative	New Democratic	Liberal
Leader since	October 28, 1995	March 30, 1996	July 12, 1997
Leader's seat	Pictou Centre	Halifax Atlantic	Cape Breton North
Last election	14	19	19
Seats won	30	11	11
Seat change	▲16	▼8	▼8
Popular vote	169,383	129,474	128,795
Percentage	38.93%	29.76%	29.60%
Swing	▲9.33pp	▼4.67pp	▼5.50pp
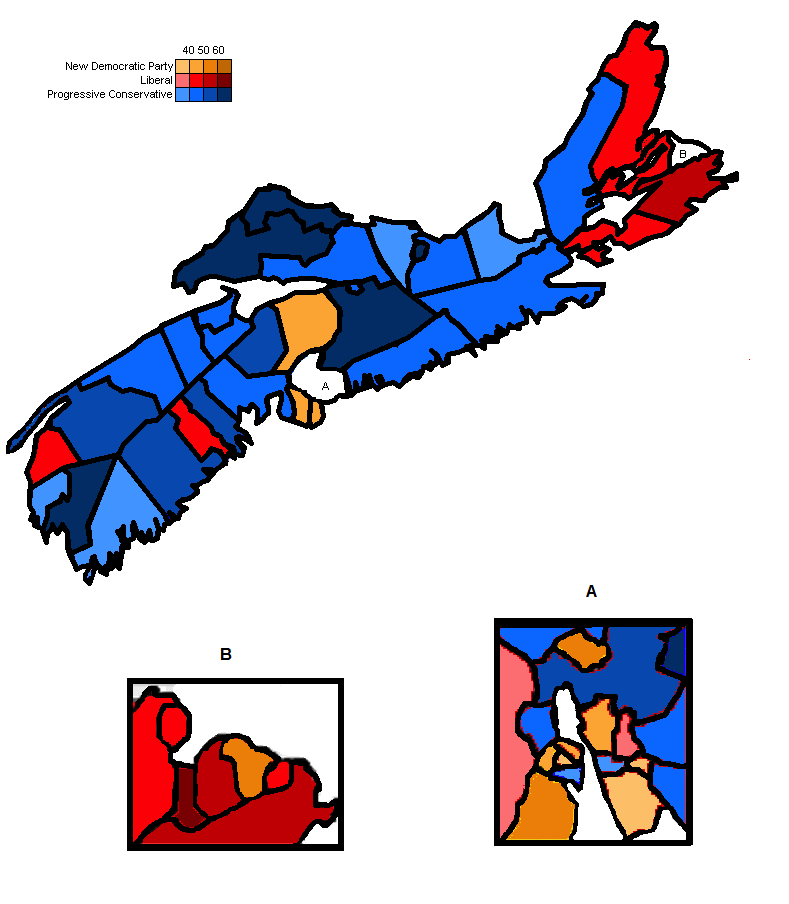
- Riding map of Nova Scotia showing winning parties (Halifax is A - Cape Breton is B)
Premier before election
Russell MacLellan
Liberal
Premier after election
John Hamm
Progressive Conservative

The 1999 Nova Scotia general election was held on July 27, 1999, to elect members of the 58th House of Assembly of the Province of Nova Scotia, Canada. The government was defeated on a money bill on June 18, and the Nova Scotia House of Assembly was dissolved by Lieutenant Governor James Kinley. It was won by the Progressive Conservative party, led by Dr. John Hamm. They received a majority of 30 seats compared to 11 seats by the NDP and 11 by the Liberals.

== Campaign ==
The Halifax Daily News ran an article which asked each party leader personal questions, including one about whether the candidate had ever been convicted of a criminal offence. NDP Leader Robert Chisholm said no in response, however, several days later it was revealed that Chisholm had a past criminal record for driving under the influence of alcohol when he was 19 years old. Chisholm claimed that he lied because he did not want his daughter to find out about his past.

== Results ==
=== Results by party ===
↓
30	11	11
Progressive Conservative	New Democratic	Liberal

Official results
Party	Party leader	# of candidates	Seats				Popular vote		
Party	Party leader	# of candidates	1998	Dissolution	Elected	Change	#	%	Change (pp)
Progressive Conservative	John Hamm	52	14	13	30	+16	169,383	38.93%	+9.33%
New Democratic	Robert Chisholm	52	19	19	11	-8	129,474	29.76%	-4.67%
Liberal	Russell MacLellan	52	19	19	11	-8	128,795	29.60%	-5.50%
Nova Scotia Party	Jack Friis	17	0	0	0	0	3,153	0.72%	–
Independent		5	0	1	0	0	1,278	0.29%	0.00%
Vacant				0					
Total valid votes							432,083	99.31%	+0.12%
Blank and invalid ballots							2,983	0.69%	+0.12%
Total		178	52	52	52	–	435,066	100.00%	–
Registered voters / turnout							638,655	68.12%	-1.35%

Popular vote
PC	38.93%
New Democratic	29.76%
Liberal	29.60%
Nova Scotia Party	0.72%
Independent	0.29%

Seats summary
PC	57.69%
New Democratic	21.15%
Liberal	21.15%

=== Results by region ===
Party name		HRM	C.B.	Valley	S. Shore	Fundy	Central	Total
Parties winning seats in the legislature:
Progressive Conservative	Seats:	7	1	6	6	5	5	30
Progressive Conservative	Popular vote:	36.64%	17.26%	48.06%	46.24%	55.96%	46.00%	38.93%
New Democratic Party	Seats:	9	1	—	—	1	—	11
New Democratic Party	Popular vote:	37.24%	33.77%	21.47%	23.49%	24.14%	25.57%	29.76%
Liberal	Seats:	1	8	1	1	—	—	11
Liberal	Popular vote:	24.68%	47.53%	29.64%	29.45%	19.03%	28.16%	29.60%
Parties not winning seats in the legislature:
Nova Scotia Party	Popular vote:	1.35%	—	0.83%	0.82%	0.21%	0.27%	0.72%
Independents	Popular vote:	0.09%	1.44%	—	—	0.66%	—	0.29%
Total seats:		17	9	7	7	6	5	52

== Retiring incumbents ==
Liberal

- Laurie Montgomery, Annapolis
- Ed Lorraine, Colchester North
- Gerry Fogarty, Halifax Bedford Basin
- Francene Cosman, Bedford-Fall River

Progressive Conservative

- George Archibald, Kings North
- George Moody, Kings West
- John Leefe, Queens

Independent

- Reeves Matheson, Cape Breton East

== Nominated candidates ==
Legend
bold denotes party leader
† denotes an incumbent who is not running for re-election or was defeated in nomination contest

=== Valley ===
Electoral district	Candidates					Incumbent
Electoral district	Liberal	NDP	PC	Nova Scotia	Independent	Incumbent
Annapolis	Stephen McNeil; 3,265; 35.22%	Tom Clahane; 1,708; 18.43%	Frank Chipman; 4,026; 43.43%	Paul Mann; 271; 2.92%		Laurie Montgomery †
Clare	Wayne Gaudet; 2,705; 43.76%	Don Melanson; 1,078; 17.44%	Paul Comeau; 2,355; 38.10%	Anne Marie Boyer; 43; 0.70%		Wayne Gaudet
Digby—Annapolis	Vivian O'Neil; 1,550; 24.09%	Steve Downes; 1,105; 17.17%	Gordon Balser; 3,780; 58.74%			Gordon Balser
Hants West	Joe Robertson; 2,015; 22.25%	Dick Terfry; 1,764; 19.48%	Ron Russell; 5,276; 58.27%			Ron Russell
Kings North	Peter Hill; 1,975; 22.42%	Neil H. McNeil; 2,513; 28.53%	Mark Parent; 4,321; 49.05%			George Archibald †
Kings South	Robbie Harrison; 3,213; 33.23%	Mary DeWolfe; 2,567; 26.55%	David Morse; 3,890; 40.23%			Robbie Harrison
Kings West	Don Clarke; 2,346; 28.70%	Jacquie DeMestral; 1,629; 19.93%	Jon Carey; 4,033; 49.34%	Frances Adams; 166; 2.03%		George Moody†

=== South Shore ===
Electoral district	Candidates					Incumbent
Electoral district	Liberal	NDP	PC	Nova Scotia	Independent	Incumbent
Argyle	Karen Kravfe; 820; 15.55%	Belinda Tucker; 343; 6.51%	Neil LeBlanc; 4,060; 77.01%	Oscar Harris; 49; 0.93%		Neil LeBlanc
Chester—St. Margaret's	Karen Willis Duerden; 1,971; 21.28%	Hinrich Bitter-Suermann; 3,098; 33.45%	John Chataway; 4,193; 45.27%			Hinrich Bitter-Suermann
Lunenburg	Lila O'Connor; 2,344; 26.29%	Marilyn B. Crook; 1,982; 22.23%	Michael Baker; 4,590; 51.48%			Michael Baker
Lunenburg West	Don Downe; 4,248; 45.46%	Eric Hustvedt; 1,846; 19.75%	Jerry Swain; 3,251; 34.79%			Don Downe
Queens	Eddie Whitty; 1,296; 20.77%	John Wiles; 1,498; 24.00%	Kerry Morash; 3,447; 55.23%			John Leefe †
Shelburne	Clifford Huskilson; 3,206; 41.54%	Dianne Nickerson; 1,306; 16.92%	Cecil O'Donnell; 3,206; 41.54%			Clifford Huskilson
Yarmouth	Phil DeMille; 2,605; 28.21%	John Deveau; 3,079; 33.34%	Richard Hurlburt; 3,141; 34.02%	Brian W. Hurlburt; 409; 4.43%		John Deveau

=== Fundy-Northeast ===
Electoral district	Candidates					Incumbent
Electoral district	Liberal	NDP	PC	Nova Scotia	Independent	Incumbent
Colchester—Musquodoboit Valley	Leo Stacey; 1,052; 12.97%	Jim Harpell; 1,591; 19.62%	Brooke Taylor; 5,465; 67.40%			Brooke Taylor
Colchester North	John Davidson; 2,274; 27.03%	Ralph Martin; 2,411; 28.66%	Bill Langille; 3,728; 44.31%			Ed Lorraine †
Cumberland North	Kathy Langille; 1,595; 19.02%	Doug Wilson; 856; 10.21%	Ernie Fage; 5,936; 70.78%			Ernie Fage
Cumberland South	John Harrison; 1,000; 13.39%	Scott McKee; 941; 12.60%	Murray Scott; 5,527; 74.01%			Murray Scott
Hants East	Sara Stewart; 2,150; 23.33%	John MacDonell; 3,985; 43.25%	Reese Morash; 3,079; 33.42%			John MacDonell
Truro—Bible Hill	Matthew Graham; 1,613; 18.21%	Ibel Scammell; 2,499; 28.21%	Jamie Muir; 4,747; 53.58%			Jamie Muir

=== Central Halifax ===
Electoral district	Candidates					Incumbent
Electoral district	Liberal	NDP	PC	Nova Scotia	Independent	Incumbent
Halifax Bedford Basin	Jack Hardiman; 2,935; 27.74%	Errol Gaum; 2,946; 27.85%	Mary Ann McGrath; 4,489; 42.43%	Janice Lively; 209; 1.98%		Gerry Fogarty †
Halifax Chebucto	Royden Trainer; 2,286; 27.27%	Howard Epstein; 3,159; 37.69%	Sean Phillips; 2,811; 33.54%	Hilda M. Stevens; 126; 1.50%		Howard Epstein
Halifax Citadel	Ed Kinley; 2,752; 29.88%	Peter Delefes; 2,958; 32.11%	Jane Purves; 3,392; 36.83%	Grace Patterson; 52; 0.56%	Art Canning; 57; 0.62%	Peter Delefes
Halifax Fairview	Greta Murtagh; 1,888; 24.15%	Eileen O'Connell; 3,615; 46.23%	Narayana Swamy; 2,117; 27.08%	Maria Alexandridis; 199; 2.55%		Eileen O'Connell
Halifax Needham	Mike Rogers; 1,970; 25.12%	Maureen MacDonald; 3,525; 44.95%	Linda Carvery; 2,185; 27.86%	Scott Higgins; 162; 2.07%		Maureen MacDonald

=== Suburban Halifax ===
Electoral district	Candidates					Incumbent
Electoral district	Liberal	NDP	PC	Nova Scotia	Independent	Incumbent
Bedford—Fall River	Gerry St. Armand; 2,197; 19.17%	Jane Earle; 2,700; 23.55%	Peter Christie; 6,566; 57.28%			Francene Cosman †
Halifax Atlantic	David Melnick; 1,458; 16.53%	**Robert Chisholm**; 4,266; 48.37%	Bruce Cooke; 2,794; 31.68%	Gerald Rodgers; 234; 2.65%	Golda M. Redden; 68; 0.77%	Robert Chisholm
Sackville—Beaver Bank	Bill MacDonald; 2,276; 25.86%	Rosemary Godin; 2,951; 33.53%	Barry Barnet; 3,573; 40.60%			Rosemary Godin
Sackville—Cobequid	Kevin Perkins; 1,235; 14.59%	John Holm; 4,787; 56.57%	Wade Marshall; 2,440; 28.83%			John Holm
Timberlea—Prospect	Vicki Brown; 2,171; 23.34%	Bill Estabrooks; 4,356; 46.83%	Ken Fralick; 2,600; 27.95%	Ken Bumstead; 174; 1.87%		Bill Estabrooks

=== Dartmouth/Cole Harbour/Eastern Shore ===
Electoral district	Candidates					Incumbent
Electoral district	Liberal	NDP	PC	Nova Scotia	Independent	Incumbent
Cole Harbour—Eastern Passage	Colin MacEachern; 2,216; 23.39%	Kevin Deveaux; 3,721; 39.27%	Nadine Cooper Mont; 3,539; 37.35%			Kevin Deveaux
Dartmouth—Cole Harbour	Peter Foy; 2,150; 25.79%	Darrell Dexter; 3,164; 37.95%	Greg Frampton; 2,750; 32.98%	Rufus Peacock; 274; 3.29%		Darrell Dexter
Dartmouth East	Jim Smith; 2,975; 37.39%	Heather Henderson; 2,272; 28.55%	Terry Degen; 2,710; 34.06%			Jim Smith
Dartmouth North	Frank Cameron; 1,746; 24.74%	Jerry Pye; 3,105; 44.01%	Jane MacKay; 2,060; 29.20%	Susan Livingstone; 145; 2.05%		Jerry Pye
Dartmouth South	Audrey Goodyer; 2,322; 25.83%	Don Chard; 3,011; 33.50%	Tim Olive; 3,656; 40.67%			Don Chard
Eastern Shore	Keith Colwell; 2,695; 31.01%	Mary-Alice Tzagarakis; 1,970; 22.67%	Bill Dooks; 3,637; 41.85%	**Jack Friis**; 388; 4.46%		Keith Colwell
Preston	Wendell Thomas; 509; 13.38%	Yvonne Atwell; 1,496; 39.32%	David Hendsbee; 1,800; 47.31%			Yvonne Atwell

=== Central Nova ===
Electoral district	Candidates					Incumbent
Electoral district	Liberal	NDP	PC	Nova Scotia	Independent	Incumbent
Antigonish	Hyland Fraser; 4,058; 39.18%	Charlene Long; 2,229; 21.52%	Angus MacIsaac; 4,070; 39.30%			Hyland Fraser
Guysborough—Port Hawkesbury	Ray White; 3,151; 40.19%	Wendy Panagopoulos; 1,267; 16.16%	Ron Chisholm; 3,285; 41.90%			Ray White
Pictou Centre	Marie Maxwell; 1,171; 13.78%	Jeff Callaghan; 1,850; 21.76%	**John Hamm**; 5,479; 64.46%			John Hamm
Pictou East	Lynn MacDonald; 1,285; 15.76%	Andy Thompson; 2,388; 29.30%	Jim DeWolfe; 4,478; 54.94%			Jim DeWolfe
Pictou West	Paul Landry; 2,109; 25.47%	Charlie Parker; 2,955; 35.69%	Muriel Baillie; 3,102; 37.46%	D. Ed Berringer; 114; 1.38%		Charlie Parker

=== Cape Breton ===
Electoral district	Candidates					Incumbent
Electoral district	Liberal	NDP	PC	Nova Scotia	Independent	Incumbent
Cape Breton Centre	Susan Deruelle Marsh; 2,985; 39.94%	Frank Corbett; 4,042; 54.09%	John Morrissey; 446; 5.97%			Frank Corbett
Cape Breton East	Dave Wilson; 3,704; 40.12%	Cecil Saccary; 3,699; 40.06%	Brad Kerr; 1,043; 11.30%		Gerard Burke; 787; 8.52%	Reeves Matheson †
Cape Breton North	**Russell MacLellan**; 4,222; 48.69%	Archie MacKinnon; 2,587; 29.83%	Murray Johnston; 1,863; 21.48%			Russell MacLellan
Cape Breton Nova	Paul MacEwan; 4,004; 53.44%	Gordie Gosse; 3,253; 43.42%	Harold Dorrington; 235; 3.14%			Paul MacEwan
Cape Breton South	Manning MacDonald; 5,356; 62.90%	Elizabeth Cusack; 2,451; 28.78%	Leland Lewis; 708; 8.31%			Manning MacDonald
Cape Breton—The Lakes	Brian Boudreau; 3,715; 43.70%	Helen MacDonald; 3,614; 42.51%	Ken Langley; 1,173; 13.80%			Helen MacDonald
Cape Breton West	Russell MacKinnon; 5,094; 51.83%	Brian Slaney; 3,359; 34.18%	Joe Boudreau; 1,375; 13.99%			Russell MacKinnon
Inverness	Charlie MacDonald; 3,549; 39.27%	Roy Yipp; 1,612; 17.84%	Rodney MacDonald; 3,876; 42.89%			Charlie MacDonald
Richmond	Michel Samson; 3,105; 47.01%	Wilma Conrod; 1,595; 24.15%	Joseph MacPhee; 1,905; 28.84%			Michel Samson
Victoria	Kennie MacAskill; 2,263; 49.46%	Nancy MacKeigan; 772; 16.87%	Anna Curtis-Steele; 1,174; 25.66%		Osborne Burke; 229; 5.01% Stemer MacLeod; 137; 2.99%	Kennie MacAskill

== See also ==
- List of Nova Scotia general elections
- List of Nova Scotia political parties
