= Russell MacLellan =

Premier of Nova Scotia from 1997 to 1999

The Honourable Russell MacLellan ECNS
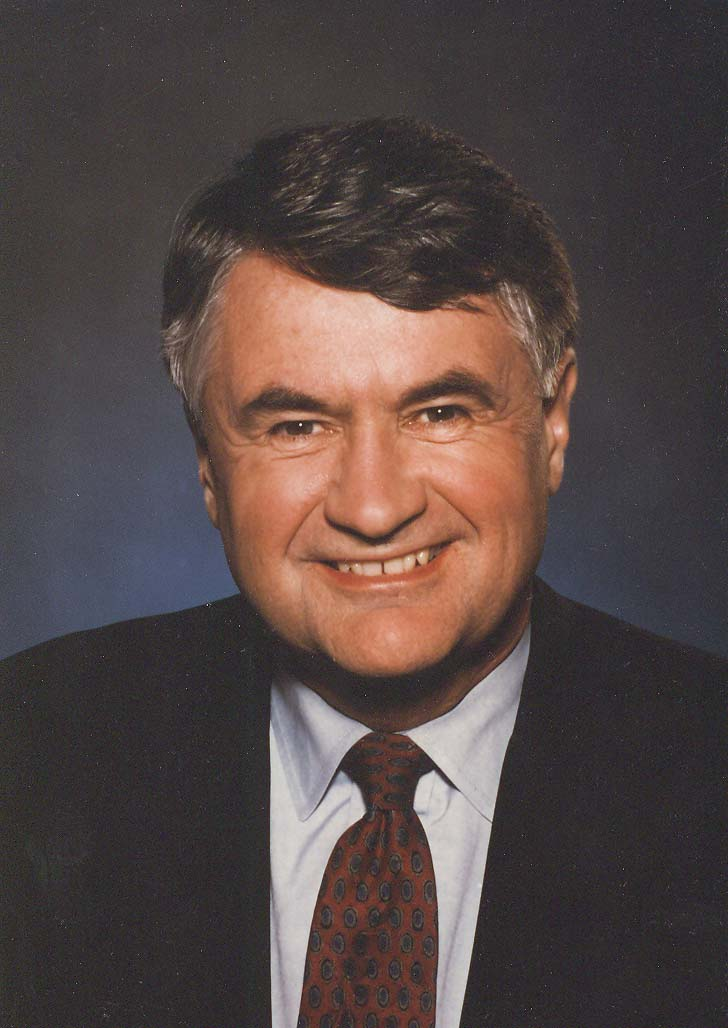

24th Premier of Nova Scotia
- In office July 18, 1997 – August 16, 1999
- Monarch: Elizabeth II
- Lieutenant Governor: James Kinley
- Preceded by: John Savage
- Succeeded by: John Hamm

MP for Cape Breton—The Sydneys
- In office May 22, 1979 – June 2, 1997
- Preceded by: Robert Muir
- Succeeded by: Riding dissolved

MLA for Cape Breton North
- In office November 4, 1997 – October 4, 2000
- Preceded by: Ron Stewart
- Succeeded by: Cecil Clarke

Leader of the Nova Scotia Liberal Party
- In office July 12, 1997 – June 30, 2000
- Preceded by: John Savage
- Succeeded by: Wayne Gaudet

Personal details
- Born: Russell Gregoire MacLellan; January 16, 1940 (age 86) Halifax, Nova Scotia, Canada
- Party: Liberal
- Spouse: Ann MacLean

Russell Gregoire MacLellan (born January 16, 1940) is a Canadian politician who served as the 24th premier of Nova Scotia from 1997 to 1999.

== Federal politics ==
He was first elected to the House of Commons of Canada in the 1979 federal election for the riding of Cape Breton—The Sydneys and sat as a Liberal MP until 1997.

== Provincial politics ==
In 1997, he became leader of the Nova Scotia Liberal Party and premier of the province after John Savage was forced to resign due to discontent within his party and sagging polls. MacLellan tried to revive the Liberal government's fortunes; he narrowly won a minority government in the 1998 election, but his government was defeated in a confidence vote in 1999 and then defeated in the resulting 1999 election.

On January 26, 2000, MacLellan announced he would step down as Liberal leader on June 30. He continued to sit as an MLA until resigning in October 2000.

== After politics ==
Following his resignation, MacLellan returned to practising law, working for the Halifax-based law firm, Merrick Holm.
