= Nova Scotia New Democratic Party leadership elections =

This page lists the results of leadership elections held by the Nova Scotia New Democratic Party. Though the party came into existence in 1961 with the merger of the Co-operative Commonwealth Federation and the Canadian Labour Congress, the position of party leader was not officially created until the 1966 convention. Outgoing CCF leader Michael James MacDonald led the party in the legislature until 1963. The party was led into the 1963 provincial election by party president 1963 until 1966 James H. Aitchison who served as de facto leader until 1966 when he was officially elected to the position of leader.

== 1963 leadership convention ==
(Held in November 1963)

- James H. Aitchison presumably acclaimed

== 1968 leadership convention ==
(Held on November 9, 1968)

- Jeremy Akerman 80
- Keith Jobson 76

== 1980 leadership convention ==
(Held on November 16, 1980)

- Alexa McDonough 237
- Len J. Arsenault 42
- Buddy MacEachern 41

== 1996 leadership convention ==
(Held on March 30, 1996)

- Robert Chisholm 201
- Yvonne Atwell 39

== 2000 leadership convention ==
(Held on July 15, 2000)

First Ballot:

- Helen MacDonald 193
- Kevin Deveaux 172
- Maureen MacDonald 154
- Dave Peters 47
- Hinrich Bitter-Suermann 31

Second Ballot (Bitter-Suermann eliminated. Peters withdrew):

- Kevin Deveaux 211
- Helen MacDonald 207
- Maureen MacDonald 177

Third Ballot (Maureen MacDonald eliminated):

- Helen MacDonald 322
- Kevin Deveaux 262

MacDonald was unable to gain election to the House of Assembly and resigned on April 30, 2001. Darrell Dexter was chosen interim leader.

== 2002 leadership convention ==
(Held on June 2, 2002)

- Darrell Dexter 2,006
- John MacDonell 1,181

== 2016 leadership convention ==
Was held on February 27, 2016 following the resignation of Darrell Dexter on November 16, 2013.

Candidates:

First ballot:

- Gary Burrill: 921 - 40.59%
- Lenore Zann: 705 - 31.07%
- Dave Wilson: 645 - 28.34%

Second ballot:

- Gary Burrill: 1343 - 59.19%
- Lenore Zann: 926 - 40.81%

== 2022 leadership convention ==
(To be held June 25, 2022)

The election will be conducted on a One Member One Vote basis.
