= Halifax Needham =

Provincial electoral district in Nova Scotia, Canada

Coordinates: 44.6632°N 63.600°W

Nova Scotia electoral district
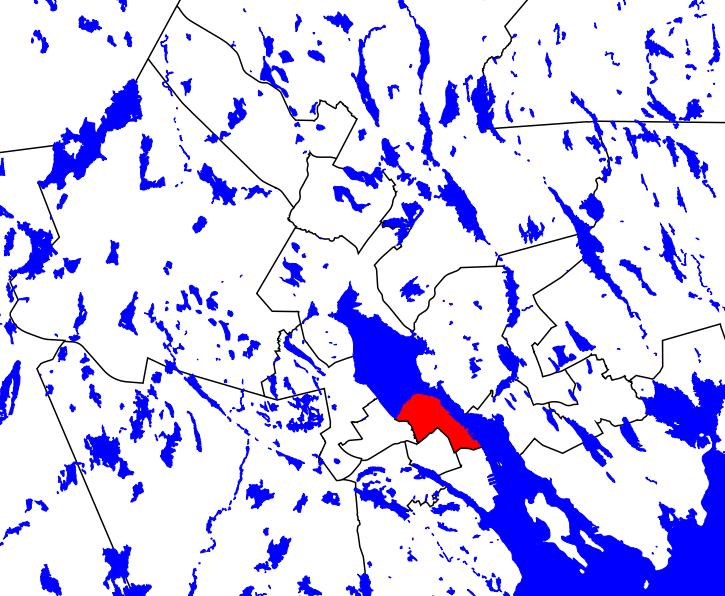
- Location of Halifax Needham in the Metro Halifax area

Provincial electoral district
- Legislature: Nova Scotia House of Assembly
MLA
Suzy Hansen
New Democratic
- District created: 1967
- First contested: 1967
- Last contested: 2024

Demographics
- Population (2016): 19,426
- Electors: 15,372
- Area (km²): 6.00
- Pop. density (per km²): 3,237.7
- Census division: Halifax Regional Municipality

Halifax Needham is a provincial electoral district in Halifax, Nova Scotia, Canada, that elects one member of the Nova Scotia House of Assembly. It has existed since 1967, though its boundaries have changed periodically.

Halifax Needham encompasses what is largely known as the North End of Halifax. It has been held by members of each of the three major political parties in Nova Scotia at different times. The riding was once the home of Liberal Premier Gerald Regan before going to Progressive Conservative Edmund L. Morris for the majority of the 1980s. Morris served as a Member of Parliament for Halifax under Progressive Conservative Prime Minister John Diefenbaker before becoming the Mayor of Halifax. He served in the Provincial Cabinet as Minister of Intergovernmental Affairs, Municipal Affairs, Fisheries, and Social Services.

When he stepped down in 1988, the Progressive Conservatives lost the seat in that election to Gerry O'Malley, who was unseated from his position as Liberal Minister of Supply and Services in 1998. Maureen MacDonald held the seat from 1998 until 2016. The seat is considered a reasonably safe seat for the NDP, though the 2013 election was close, amid a province-wide swing to the Liberals.

It was created in 1966 when Halifax North was divided into three districts, one of which was Halifax City North East. The district was renamed Halifax Needham in 1967. In 2003, it gained an area east of Citadel Hill from Halifax Citadel. In 2013, it lost the area south of Robie Street and east of Young Street to Halifax Chebucto and gained the area north of Bayers Road and east of Connaught Avenue from Halifax Chebucto.

== Members of the Legislative Assembly ==
This riding has elected the following members of the Legislative Assembly:

Legislature	Years	Member	Party
Halifax North; Riding created from Halifax
40th	1933–1937	Gordon Isnor	Liberal
41st	1937–1941	Harold Connolly	Liberal
42nd	1941–1945	Harold Connolly	Liberal
43rd	1945–1949	Harold Connolly	Liberal
44th	1949–1953	Harold Connolly	Liberal
45th	1953–1956	Harold Connolly	Liberal
46th	1956–1960	John E. Ahern	Liberal
47th	1960–1963	John E. Ahern	Liberal
48th	1963–1967	James H. Vaughan	Progressive Conservative
Halifax Needham
49th	1967–1970	Gerald Regan	Liberal
50th	1970–1974	Gerald Regan	Liberal
51st	1974–1978	Gerald Regan	Liberal
52nd	1978–1980	Gerald Regan	Liberal
52nd	1980–1981	Edmund L. Morris	Progressive Conservative
53rd	1981–1984	Edmund L. Morris	Progressive Conservative
54th	1984–1988	Edmund L. Morris	Progressive Conservative
55th	1988–1993	Gerry O'Malley	Liberal
56th	1993–1998	Gerry O'Malley	Liberal
57th	1998–1999	Maureen MacDonald	New Democratic
58th	1999–2003	Maureen MacDonald	New Democratic
59th	2003–2005	Maureen MacDonald	New Democratic
60th	2006–2009	Maureen MacDonald	New Democratic
61st	2009–2013	Maureen MacDonald	New Democratic
62nd	2013–2016	Maureen MacDonald	New Democratic
62nd	2016–2017	Lisa Roberts	New Democratic
63rd	2017–2021	Lisa Roberts	New Democratic
64th	2021–2024	Suzy Hansen	New Democratic
65th	2024–present	Suzy Hansen	New Democratic

== Geography ==
The land-area of Halifax Needham is 6 km^{2} (2.3 sq mi).

== Election results ==
=== 2024 ===
2024 Nova Scotia general election
Party	Candidate	Votes	%	±%
New Democratic	Suzy Hansen	5,063	67.76	+8.79
Progressive Conservative	Trayvone Clayton	1,279	17.12	+7.08
Liberal	Jon Frost	1,003	13.42	-15.65
Green	Amethyste Hamel-Gregory	127	1.70	-0.22
Total		7,472	–	
Total rejected ballots		47		
Turnout		7,587	43.49	
Eligible voters		17,446		
New Democratic hold		Swing		
Source: Elections Nova Scotia

=== 2021 ===
2017 provincial election redistributed results
Party	Vote	%
New Democratic	4,007	51.29
Liberal	2,220	28.42
Progressive Conservative	1,125	14.40
Green	460	5.89

2021 Nova Scotia general election
Party	Candidate	Votes	%	±%	Expenditures
New Democratic	Suzy Hansen	5,308	58.96	+7.67	$70,071.07
Liberal	Colin Coady	2,617	29.07	+0.65	$63,403.44
Progressive Conservative	Scott Ellis	904	10.04	-4.36	$25,818.91
Green	Kai Trappenberg	173	1.92	-3.97	$200.00
Total valid votes/expense limit		9,002	99.52	–	$97,461.81
Total rejected ballots		43	0.48		
Turnout		9,045	53.34		
Eligible voters		16,957			
New Democratic hold		Swing		+3.51	
Source: Elections Nova Scotia

=== 2017 ===
2017 Nova Scotia general election
Party	Candidate	Votes	%	±%
New Democratic	Lisa Roberts	3,880	51.36	+0.43
Liberal	Melinda Daye	2,075	27.47	-6.13
Progressive Conservative	Matthew Donahoe	1,135	15.02	+2.86
Green	Andrew Jamieson	465	6.15	+2.94
Total valid votes		7,599	45.9	
Total rejected ballots		44		
Eligible voters		16,558		
New Democratic hold		Swing		-3.28
Source: Elections Nova Scotia

=== 2016 by-election ===
Nova Scotia provincial by-election, 2016-08-30
Party	Candidate	Votes	%	±%
New Democratic	Lisa Roberts	2,519	50.93	6.94
Liberal	Rod Wilson	1,666	33.68	-6.72
Progressive Conservative	Andy Arsenault	600	12.13	1.31
Green	Thomas Trappenberg	161	3.26	-1.53
Total valid votes		4,942	100.00	
Total rejected ballots		21	0.42	-0.50
Turnout		4,963	32.50	-17.93
Electors on the lists		15,270	–	
New Democratic hold		Swing		+6.87
Source(s) Source: Nova Scotia Legislature (2024). "Electoral History for Halifax Needham" (PDF). nslegislature.ca.

=== 2013 ===
2009 Nova Scotia general election redistributed results
Party	Vote	%
New Democratic	5,013	67.24
Liberal	1,632	21.89
Progressive Conservative	491	6.59
Green	319	4.28

2013 Nova Scotia general election
Party	Candidate	Votes	%	±%
New Democratic	Maureen MacDonald	3,392	43.99	-23.30
Liberal	Christopher (Chris) Poole	3,115	40.40	19.09
Progressive Conservative	Mary D. S. Hamblin	834	10.82	4.06
Green	Kris MacLellan	369	4.79	0.16
Total valid votes		7,710	100.00	
Total rejected ballots		72	0.93	
Turnout		7,782	50.43	
Electors on the lists		15,432	–	
New Democratic hold		Swing		-20.88
Source(s) Source: Nova Scotia Legislature (2024). "Electoral History for Halifax Needham" (PDF). nslegislature.ca. Nova Scotia, Chief Electoral Officer (2013). 39th Provincial General Election, October 8, 2013: Volume 1 – Statement of Votes & Statistics (PDF) (Report). Elections Nova Scotia. Archived from the original (PDF) on 10 April 2018.

=== 2009 ===
2009 Nova Scotia general election
Party	Candidate	Votes	%	±%
New Democratic	Maureen MacDonald	5,336	67.30	6.60
Liberal	Graham Estabrooks	1,690	21.31	4.42
Progressive Conservative	Jason Cameron	536	6.76	-10.87
Green	Kris MacLellan	367	4.63	-0.15
Total valid votes		7,929	100.00	
Total rejected ballots		31	0.39	
Turnout		7,960	49.01	
Electors on the lists		16,241	–	
New Democratic hold		Swing		+1.01
Source(s) Source: Nova Scotia Legislature (2024). "Electoral History for Halifax Needham" (PDF). nslegislature.ca.

=== 2006 ===
2006 Nova Scotia general election
Party	Candidate	Votes	%	±%
New Democratic	Maureen MacDonald	4,431	60.70	10.44
Progressive Conservative	Andrew Black	1,287	17.63	-1.03
Liberal	Errol Gaum	1,233	16.89	-12.62
Green	Amanda Myers	349	4.78	–
Total valid votes		7,321	100.00	
Total rejected ballots		32	0.44	
Turnout		7,353	49.85	
Electors on the lists		14,750	–	
New Democratic hold		Swing		+5.43
Source(s) Source: Nova Scotia Legislature (2024). "Electoral History for Halifax Needham" (PDF). nslegislature.ca.

=== 2003 ===
2003 Nova Scotia general election
Party	Candidate	Votes	%	±%
New Democratic	Maureen MacDonald	3,709	50.26	5.31
Liberal	Mike Rodgers	2,178	29.51	4.39
Progressive Conservative	Linda Carvery	1,377	18.66	-9.20
Nova Scotia Party	Blair Baxter	116	1.57	-0.49
Total valid votes		7,380	100.00	
Total rejected ballots		59	0.79	
Turnout		7,439	55.17	
Electors on the lists		13,484	–	
Source(s) Source: Nova Scotia Legislature (2024). "Electoral History for Halifax Needham" (PDF). nslegislature.ca.

=== 1999 ===
1999 Nova Scotia general election
Party	Candidate	Votes	%	±%
New Democratic	Maureen MacDonald	3,525	44.95	-13.56
Progressive Conservative	Linda Carvery	2,185	27.86	16.69
Liberal	Mike Rogers	1,970	25.12	-5.19
Nova Scotia Party	Scott Higgins	162	2.07	–
Total		7,842	–	
Source(s) Source: Nova Scotia Legislature (2024). "Electoral History for Halifax Needham" (PDF). nslegislature.ca. Nova Scotia, Chief Electoral Officer (1999). Returns of the General Election for the House of Assembly, Thirty-Fifth General Election (Report). Elections Nova Scotia.

=== 1998 ===
1998 Nova Scotia general election
Party	Candidate	Votes	%	±%
New Democratic	Maureen MacDonald	4,837	58.51	23.03
Liberal	Gerry O'Malley	2,506	30.31	-14.87
Progressive Conservative	Atho Kartsaklis	924	11.18	-7.31
Total		8,267	–	
Source(s) Source: Nova Scotia Legislature (2024). "Electoral History for Halifax Needham" (PDF). nslegislature.ca.

=== 1993 ===
1993 Nova Scotia general election
Party	Candidate	Votes	%	±%
Liberal	Gerry O'Malley	4,527	45.18	3.28
New Democratic	Innis MacDonald	3,555	35.48	2.95
Progressive Conservative	Ron W. Milsom	1,852	18.48	-7.08
Natural Law	Ian Temple	85	0.85	–
Total		10,019	–	
Source(s) Source: Nova Scotia Legislature (2024). "Electoral History for Halifax Needham" (PDF). nslegislature.ca. Nova Scotia, Chief Electoral Officer (1993). Returns of the General Election for the House of Assembly, Thirty-Third General Election (PDF) (Report). Queen's Printer. Archived from the original (PDF) on 18 June 2018.

=== 1988 ===
1988 Nova Scotia general election
Party	Candidate	Votes	%	±%
Liberal	Gerry O'Malley	3,469	41.91	14.09
New Democratic	Maureen MacDonald	2,693	32.53	0.87
Progressive Conservative	Randy Dewell	2,116	25.56	-14.41
Total		8,278	–	
Source(s) Source: Nova Scotia Legislature (2024). "Electoral History for Halifax Needham" (PDF). nslegislature.ca. Nova Scotia, Chief Electoral Officer (1988). Returns of the General Election for the House of Assembly, Thirty-Second General Election (PDF) (Report). Queen's Printer. Archived from the original (PDF) on 7 July 2018.

=== 1984 ===
1984 Nova Scotia general election
Party	Candidate	Votes	%	±%
Progressive Conservative	Edmund L. Morris	3,173	39.97	1.92
New Democratic	Maureen MacDonald	2,514	31.67	2.01
Liberal	Walter Fitzgerald	2,208	27.81	-4.48
Labour	Beatrice Kaizer	44	0.55	–
Total		7,939	–	
Source(s) Source: Nova Scotia Legislature (2024). "Electoral History for Halifax Needham" (PDF). nslegislature.ca. Nova Scotia, Chief Electoral Officer (1984). Returns of the General Election for the House of Assembly, Thirty-First General Election (PDF) (Report). Queen's Printer. Archived from the original (PDF) on 31 July 2017.

=== 1981 ===
1981 Nova Scotia general election
Party	Candidate	Votes	%	±%
Progressive Conservative	Edmund L. Morris	3,300	38.05	-6.25
Liberal	Dan Clarke	2,801	32.30	-11.56
New Democratic	Phil Davis	2,572	29.66	17.81
Total		8,673	–	
Source(s) Source: Nova Scotia Legislature (2024). "Electoral History for Halifax Needham" (PDF). nslegislature.ca. Nova Scotia, Chief Electoral Officer (1981). Returns of the General Election for the House of Assembly, Thirtieth General Election (PDF) (Report). Queen's Printer. Archived from the original (PDF) on 31 July 2017.

=== 1980 ===
Nova Scotia provincial by-election, 1980-05-06
Party	Candidate	Votes	%	±%
Progressive Conservative	Edmund L. Morris	2,618	44.30	2.59
Liberal	Dan Clarke	2,592	43.86	0.48
New Democratic	Rocky Jones	700	11.84	-3.07
Total		5,910	–	
Source(s) Source: Nova Scotia Legislature (2024). "Electoral History for Halifax Needham" (PDF). nslegislature.ca.

=== 1978 ===
1978 Nova Scotia general election
Party	Candidate	Votes	%	±%
Liberal	Gerald Regan	3,553	43.38	-18.11
Progressive Conservative	Pat Curran	3,416	41.70	15.58
New Democratic	James "Dusty" Miller	1,222	14.92	2.53
Total		8,191	–	
Source(s) Source: Nova Scotia Legislature (2024). "Electoral History for Halifax Needham" (PDF). nslegislature.ca. Nova Scotia, Chief Electoral Officer (1978). Returns of the General Election for the House of Assembly, Twenty-Ninth General Election (PDF) (Report). Queen's Printer. Archived from the original (PDF) on 18 June 2018.

=== 1974 ===
1974 Nova Scotia general election
Party	Candidate	Votes	%	±%
Liberal	Gerald Regan	4,364	61.49	3.57
Progressive Conservative	James H. Vaughan	1,854	26.12	-10.92
New Democratic	Marty Dolin	879	12.39	7.36
Total		7,097	–	
Source(s) Source: Nova Scotia Legislature (2024). "Electoral History for Halifax Needham" (PDF). nslegislature.ca. Nova Scotia, Chief Electoral Officer (1974). Returns of the General Election for the House of Assembly, Twenty-Eighth General Election (PDF) (Report). Queen's Printer. Archived from the original (PDF) on 18 June 2018.

=== 1970 ===
1970 Nova Scotia general election
Party	Candidate	Votes	%	±%
Liberal	Gerald Regan	4,514	57.92	9.74
Progressive Conservative	David MacKeen	2,887	37.05	-9.67
New Democratic	Alasdair Sinclair	392	5.03	-0.07
Total		7,793	–	
Source(s) Source: Nova Scotia Legislature (2024). "Electoral History for Halifax Needham" (PDF). nslegislature.ca. Nova Scotia, Legislative Assembly (1970). Returns of the General Election for the House of Assembly, 1970 (PDF) (Report). Queen's Printer. Archived from the original (PDF) on 25 July 2018.

=== 1967 ===
1967 Nova Scotia general election
Party	Candidate	Votes	%	±%
Liberal	Gerald Regan	3,354	48.18	–
Progressive Conservative	Cecil Moore	3,252	46.72	–
New Democratic	Buddy Daye	355	5.10	–
Total		6,961	–	
Source(s) Source: Nova Scotia Legislature (2024). "Electoral History for Halifax Needham" (PDF). nslegislature.ca. Nova Scotia Legislature (1967). Returns of the General Election for the House of Assembly (PDF) (Report). Queen's Printer. Archived from the original (PDF) on 25 July 2018.

== See also ==
- List of Nova Scotia provincial electoral districts
- Canadian provincial electoral districts
