= Halifax North =

Former provincial electoral district in Nova Scotia, Canada

Nova Scotia electoral district

Defunct provincial electoral district
- Legislature: Nova Scotia House of Assembly
- District created: 1933
- District abolished: 1967
- Last contested: 1963

Halifax North was a provincial electoral district in Nova Scotia, Canada, that elected one member of the Nova Scotia House of Assembly. It was formed in 1933 when Halifax County was divided into five distinct electoral districts. In 1966, Halifax North was divided into Halifax City Northeast and Halifax City Northwest. The following year, these districts were renamed to become Halifax Needham and Halifax Chebucto, respectively.

== Members of the Legislative Assembly ==
Halifax North elected the following members to the Legislative Assembly:

Halifax North
Legislature	Years	Member	Party
District created from Halifax County (1867–1933)
40th	1933–1936	Gordon Benjamin Isnor	Liberal
40th	1936–1937	Harold Connolly	Liberal
41st	1937–1941	Harold Connolly	Liberal
42nd	1941–1945	Harold Connolly	Liberal
43rd	1945–1949	Harold Connolly	Liberal
44th	1949–1953	Harold Connolly	Liberal
45th	1953–1955	Harold Connolly	Liberal
45th	1955–1956	Declared Vacant	NA
46th	1956–1960	John E. Ahern	Liberal
47th	1960–1963	John E. Ahern	Liberal
48th	1963–1967	James H. Vaughan	Progressive Conservative
District dissolved into Halifax Needham (1967–Present) and Halifax Chebucto (1967–Present)

== Election results ==
=== 1963 ===
1963 Nova Scotia general election
Party	Candidate	Votes	%	±%
Progressive Conservative	James H. Vaughan	8,602	52.43%	8.34%
Liberal	John E. Ahern	7,360	44.86%	-2.37%
New Democratic	Peggy Prowse	444	2.71%	-5.97%
Total		16,406	–	
Source(s) Source: Nova Scotia Legislature (2024). "Electoral History for Halifax North" (PDF). nslegislature.ca. Nova Scotia Legislature (1963). Returns of the General Election for the House of Assembly (PDF) (Report). Queen's Printer. Archived from the original (PDF) on 25 July 2018.

=== 1960 ===
1960 Nova Scotia general election
Party	Candidate	Votes	%	±%
Liberal	John E. Ahern	7,974	47.23%	-5.87%
Progressive Conservative	Robert Mullane	7,444	44.09%	-2.81%
Co-operative Commonwealth	Charles A. Moulton	1,466	8.68%	–
Total		16,884	–	
Source(s) Source: Nova Scotia Legislature (2024). "Electoral History for Halifax North" (PDF). nslegislature.ca. Nova Scotia Legislature (1960). Returns of the General Election for the House of Assembly (PDF) (Report). Queen's Printer. Archived from the original (PDF) on 25 July 2018.

=== 1956 ===
1956 Nova Scotia general election
Party	Candidate	Votes	%	±%
Liberal	John E. Ahern	8,773	53.10%	-8.27%
Progressive Conservative	John A. O'Malley	7,748	46.90%	13.15%
Total		16,521	–	
Source(s) Source: Nova Scotia Legislature (2024). "Electoral History for Halifax North" (PDF). nslegislature.ca. Nova Scotia Legislature (1956). Returns of the General Election for the House of Assembly (PDF) (Report). Queen's Printer. Archived from the original (PDF) on 10 September 2018.

=== 1953 ===
1953 Nova Scotia general election
Party	Candidate	Votes	%	±%
Liberal	Harold Connolly	8,148	61.37%	6.58%
Progressive Conservative	Harold J. Bartlow	4,481	33.75%	2.79%
Co-operative Commonwealth	Richard J. Hardiman	648	4.88%	-9.37%
Total		13,277	–	
Source(s) Source: Nova Scotia Legislature (2024). "Electoral History for Halifax North" (PDF). nslegislature.ca. Nova Scotia Legislature (1953). Returns of the General Election for the House of Assembly (PDF) (Report). Queen's Printer. Archived from the original (PDF) on 10 September 2018.

=== 1949 ===
1949 Nova Scotia general election
Party	Candidate	Votes	%	±%
Liberal	Harold Connolly	7,944	54.79%	-4.64%
Progressive Conservative	Richard Donahoe	4,489	30.96%	13.62%
Co-operative Commonwealth	Arthur Kenneth Green	2,066	14.25%	-6.44%
Total		14,499	–	
Source(s) Source: Nova Scotia Legislature (2024). "Electoral History for Halifax North" (PDF). nslegislature.ca. Nova Scotia Legislature (1949). Returns of the General Election for the House of Assembly (PDF) (Report). Queen's Printer. Archived from the original (PDF) on 10 September 2018.

=== 1945 ===
1945 Nova Scotia general election
Party	Candidate	Votes	%	±%
Liberal	Harold Connolly	6,089	59.43%	-5.55%
Co-operative Commonwealth	Thomas Burgess	2,120	20.69%	16.58%
Progressive Conservative	Bernard James Vaughn	1,777	17.34%	-13.57%
Labour	Alexander Munro	260	2.54%	–
Total		10,246	–	
Source(s) Source: Nova Scotia Legislature (2024). "Electoral History for Halifax North" (PDF). nslegislature.ca. Nova Scotia Legislature (1945). Returns of the General Election for the House of Assembly (PDF) (Report). Queen's Printer. Archived from the original (PDF) on 10 September 2018.

=== 1941 ===
1941 Nova Scotia general election
Party	Candidate	Votes	%	±%
Liberal	Harold Connolly	4,124	64.98%	7.17%
Progressive Conservative	Helen MacDonald Lownds	1,962	30.91%	-11.28%
Co-operative Commonwealth	James Ronald Clark	261	4.11%	–
Total		6,347	–	
Source(s) Source: Nova Scotia Legislature (2024). "Electoral History for Halifax North" (PDF). nslegislature.ca. Nova Scotia Legislature (1941). Returns of the General Election for the House of Assembly (PDF) (Report). Queen's Printer. Archived from the original (PDF) on 8 February 2024.

=== 1937 ===
1937 Nova Scotia general election
Party	Candidate	Votes	%	±%
Liberal	Harold Connolly	5,458	57.81%	-21.34%
Progressive Conservative	Gerald Patrick Flavin	3,984	42.19%	–
Total		9,442	–	
Source(s) Source: Nova Scotia Legislature (2024). "Electoral History for Halifax North" (PDF). nslegislature.ca. Nova Scotia Legislature (1937). Returns of the General Election for the House of Assembly (PDF) (Report). Queen's Printer. Archived from the original (PDF) on 1 March 2019.

=== 1936 ===
Nova Scotia provincial by-election, 1936-03-02
Party	Candidate	Votes	%	±%
Liberal	Harold Connolly	3,940	79.15%	17.63%
Liberal-Conservative	Ernlie J. Rudge	1,038	20.85%	-17.63%
Total		4,978	–	
Source(s) Source: Nova Scotia Legislature (2024). "Electoral History for Halifax North" (PDF). nslegislature.ca.

=== 1933 ===
1933 Nova Scotia general election
Party	Candidate	Votes	%	±%
Liberal	Gordon Benjamin Isnor	5,452	61.52%	–
Liberal-Conservative	Gerald Patrick Flavin	3,410	38.48%	–
Total		8,862	–	
Source(s) Source: Nova Scotia Legislature (2024). "Electoral History for Halifax North" (PDF). nslegislature.ca. Nova Scotia Legislature (1933). Returns of the General Election for the House of Assembly (PDF) (Report). Queen's Printer. Archived from the original (PDF) on 1 March 2019.

== See also ==
- List of Nova Scotia provincial electoral districts
- Canadian provincial electoral districts
