= 1968 Nova Scotia New Democratic Party leadership election =

- November 9, 1968
Candidate	Jeremy Akerman	Keith Jobson
Final ballot	80 (51.28%)	76 (48.72%)
Leader before election
James H. Aitchison
Elected Leader
Jeremy Akerman

1968 Nova Scotia New Democratic Party leadership election
- Date: November 9, 1968
- Resigning leader: James H. Aitchison
- Won by: Jeremy Akerman
- Ballots: 1
- Candidates: 2

The 1968 Nova Scotia New Democratic Party leadership election was held on November 9, 1968, to elect a successor to James H. Aitchison as leader of the Nova Scotia New Democratic Party. Jeremy Akerman was elected, defeating Keith Jobson.

== Background ==
James H. Aitchison had led the party in the 1963 and 1967 provincial elections. In both elections, the party failed to win any seats in the Nova Scotia House of Assembly. Aitchison had been the first leader of the party not from Cape Breton Island; and the party's subsequent poor showings in 1963 and 1967 among its traditional strongholds in the island's fishing and mining communities was attributed to Aitchison's leadership. He chose not to continue as leader in 1968.

Following the leadership election, Akerman became one of the youngest-ever leaders of a major political party in Canada at just 26 years old.

== Candidates ==
=== Jeremy Akerman ===
Jeremy Akerman was the NDP candidate for Cape Breton—East Richmond in the 1968 federal election and the Nova Scotia NDP candidate for Cape Breton West in the 1967 provincial election. Before entering politics, he had been a journalist in Sydney, and had also worked on archaeological projects at the Fortress of Louisbourg.

=== Keith Jobson ===
Keith Jobson was a university professor from Halifax.

== Ballot results ==
First Ballot
Candidate	Votes	Percentage
Jeremy Akerman	80	51.28
Keith Jobson	76	48.72
Total	156	100.00
