= Halifax Armdale =

Provincial electoral district in Nova Scotia, Canada

Nova Scotia electoral district

Provincial electoral district
- Legislature: Nova Scotia House of Assembly
MLA
Rod Wilson
New Democratic
- District created: 2012
- First contested: 2013
- Last contested: 2024

Demographics
- Electors: 12,467
- Area (km²): 12.00
- Census division: Halifax Regional Municipality

Halifax Armdale is a provincial electoral district in Nova Scotia, Canada, that elects one member of the Nova Scotia House of Assembly. This Halifax district covers the growing population of the Fairmount, Armdale and Cowie Hill areas. The northern boundary is Highway 102, the eastern boundary is Joseph Howe Drive and the Northwest Arm, while the southern boundary is Frog Pond Park in Armdale.

The district was created in 1992 as Halifax Fairview and encompassed the Cowie Hill area, formerly part of Halifax Atlantic; the Fairview area, formerly part of Halifax Bedford Basin; and the area west of the CNR tracks, formerly part of Halifax Chebucto. In 2013, following the recommendations of the 2012 Electoral Boundaries Commission, it was renamed Halifax Armdale and gained 18 per cent of the district of Halifax Atlantic, including the area east of Herring Cove Road and north of the Frog Pond Park. It lost the area north of Highway 102 and east of Northwest Arm Drive and Dunbrack Street to Fairview-Clayton Park.

== Geography ==
Halifax Armdale has a relatively small landmass at 12 km^{2} (4.6 sq mi).

== Members of the Legislative Assembly ==
This riding has elected the following members of the Legislative Assembly:

Legislature	Years	Member	Party
Halifax Fairview; Riding created from Halifax Bedford Basin and Halifax Chebucto
56th	1993–1996	Alexa McDonough	New Democratic
56th	1996–1998	Eileen O'Connell	New Democratic
57th	1998–1999	Eileen O'Connell	New Democratic
58th	1999–2001	Eileen O'Connell	New Democratic
58th	2001–2003	Graham Steele	New Democratic
59th	2003–2005	Graham Steele	New Democratic
60th	2006–2009	Graham Steele	New Democratic
61st	2009–2013	Graham Steele	New Democratic
Halifax Armdale
62nd	2013–2017	Lena Diab	Liberal
63rd	2017–2021	Lena Diab	Liberal
64th	2021–2024	Ali Duale	Liberal
65th	2024–present	Rod Wilson	New Democratic

== Election results ==
=== 2024 ===
2024 Nova Scotia general election
Party	Candidate	Votes	%	±%
New Democratic	Rod Wilson	2,521	39.40	+5.04
Progressive Conservative	Craig Myra	2,280	35.64	+13.36
Liberal	Ali Duale	1,597	24.96	-15.72
Total		6,398	–	
Total rejected ballots		45		
Turnout		6,443	44.66	
Eligible voters		14,426		
New Democratic gain		Swing		
Source: Elections Nova Scotia

=== 2021 ===
2021 Nova Scotia general election
Party	Candidate	Votes	%	±%	Expenditures
Liberal	Ali Duale	3,070	40.35	–3.22	$70,351.56
New Democratic	Julie Melanson	2,593	34.08	+1.33	$53,488.81
Progressive Conservative	Richard MacLean	1,681	22.09	+3.43	$26,722.37
Green	Jo-Ann Roberts	202	2.65	–1.26	$260.94
Independent	Stephen Chafe	63	0.83	–	$2,271.79
Total valid votes/expense limit		7,609	99.67	–	$82,778.45
Total rejected ballots		25	0.33		
Turnout		7,634	53.52		
Eligible voters		14,265			
Liberal hold		Swing		–2.28	
Source: Elections Nova Scotia

=== 2017 ===
2017 provincial election redistributed results
Party	Vote	%
Liberal	3,354	43.57
New Democratic	2,521	32.75
Progressive Conservative	1,437	18.67
Green	301	3.91
Atlantica	85	1.10

2017 Nova Scotia general election
Party	Candidate	Votes	%	±%
Liberal	Lena Diab	2,962	44.58	−4.76
New Democratic	David C. Wheeler	2,098	31.58	−2.76
Progressive Conservative	Sylvia Gillard	1,253	18.86	2.54
Green	Marc-André Tremblay	246	3.70	
Atlantica	Michael McLeod	85	1.28	
Total valid votes		6,644	100	
Total rejected ballots		23	0.35	
Turnout		6,667	53.50	
Eligible voters		12,461		
Liberal hold		Swing		−1.00
Source: Elections Nova Scotia

=== 2013 ===
2013 Nova Scotia general election
Party	Candidate	Votes	%	±%
Liberal	Lena Diab	3,208	49.57%	28.55%
New Democratic	Drew Moore	2,203	34.04%	-29.67
Progressive Conservative	Irvine T. Carvery	1,061	16.39%	4.23
Total		6,472	–	
Source(s) Source: Nova Scotia Legislature (2024). "Electoral History for Halifax Armdale" (PDF). nslegislature.ca. Nova Scotia, Chief Electoral Officer (2013). 39th Provincial General Election, October 8, 2013: Volume 1 – Statement of Votes & Statistics (PDF) (Report). Elections Nova Scotia. Archived from the original (PDF) on 10 April 2018.

=== 2009 ===
2009 Nova Scotia general election: Halifax Fairview
Party	Candidate	Votes	%	±%
New Democratic	Graham Steele	4,680	63.71%	5.08%
Liberal	Brad Armitage	1,544	21.02%	6.52%
Progressive Conservative	Paul Henderson	893	12.16%	-11.13%
Green	Jane Hester	229	3.12%	-0.47%
Total		7,346	–	
Source(s) Source: Nova Scotia Legislature (2024). "Electoral History for Halifax Fairview" (PDF). nslegislature.ca.

=== 2006 ===
2006 Nova Scotia general election: Halifax Fairview
Party	Candidate	Votes	%	±%
New Democratic	Graham Steele	4,162	58.63%	12.78%
Progressive Conservative	Bruce MacCharles	1,653	23.28%	0.83%
Liberal	Cecil MacDougall	1,029	14.49%	-15.95%
Green	Kris MacLellan	255	3.59%	–
Total		7,099	–	
Source(s) Source: Nova Scotia Legislature (2024). "Electoral History for Halifax Fairview" (PDF). nslegislature.ca.

=== 2003 ===
2003 Nova Scotia general election: Halifax Fairview
Party	Candidate	Votes	%	±%
New Democratic	Graham Steele	3,439	45.85%	-12.32%
Liberal	Susan Hayes	2,284	30.45%	3.00%
Progressive Conservative	Bruce MacCharles	1,684	22.45%	9.92%
Nova Scotia Party	David F. Boyd	94	1.25%	0.42%
Total		7,501	–	
Source(s) Source: Nova Scotia Legislature (2024). "Electoral History for Halifax Fairview" (PDF). nslegislature.ca.

=== 2001 by-election ===
Nova Scotia provincial by-election, March 6, 2001: Halifax Fairview
Party	Candidate	Votes	%	±%
New Democratic	Graham Steele	2,164	58.17%	11.94%
Liberal	Jeremy Akerman	1,021	27.45%	3.30%
Progressive Conservative	Narayana Swamy	466	12.53%	-14.55%
Marijuana	Melanie Patriquen	38	1.02%	–
Nova Scotia Party	Heather Drope	31	0.83%	-1.71%
Total		3,720	–	
Source(s) Source: Nova Scotia Legislature (2024). "Electoral History for Halifax Fairview" (PDF). nslegislature.ca. Complete Results and Statistics of Provincial By-Elections 1930–2007, Complete Poll By Poll Results (PDF) (Report). Elections Nova Scotia. Archived from the original (PDF) on 29 September 2007.

=== 1999 ===
1999 Nova Scotia general election: Halifax Fairview
Party	Candidate	Votes	%	±%
New Democratic	Eileen O'Connell	3,615	46.23%	-7.52%
Progressive Conservative	Narayana Swamy	2,117	27.08%	10.86%
Liberal	Greta Murtagh	1,888	24.15%	-5.88%
Nova Scotia Party	Maria Alexandridis	199	2.55%	–
Total		7,819	–	
Source(s) Source: Nova Scotia Legislature (2024). "Electoral History for Halifax Fairview" (PDF). nslegislature.ca. Nova Scotia, Chief Electoral Officer (1999). Returns of the General Election for the House of Assembly, Thirty-Fifth General Election (Report). Elections Nova Scotia.

=== 1998 ===
1998 Nova Scotia general election: Halifax Fairview
Party	Candidate	Votes	%	±%
New Democratic	Eileen O'Connell	4,649	53.76%	-11.49%
Liberal	Bob Britton	2,597	30.03%	13.67%
Progressive Conservative	Brian Nash	1,402	16.21%	-2.18%
Total		8,648	–	
Source(s) Source: Nova Scotia Legislature (2024). "Electoral History for Halifax Fairview" (PDF). nslegislature.ca.

=== 1996 by-election ===
Nova Scotia provincial by-election, June 4, 1996: Halifax Fairview
Party	Candidate	Votes	%	±%
New Democratic	Eileen O'Connell	4,434	65.24%	19.73%
Progressive Conservative	Rosanna Liberatore	1,250	18.39%	-1.36%
Liberal	Mary Ann Crowley	1,112	16.36%	-17.46%
Total		6,796	–	
Source(s) Source: Nova Scotia Legislature (2024). "Electoral History for Halifax Fairview" (PDF). nslegislature.ca. Complete Results and Statistics of Provincial By-Elections 1930–2007, Complete Poll By Poll Results (PDF) (Report). Elections Nova Scotia. Archived from the original (PDF) on 29 September 2007.

=== 1993 ===
1993 Nova Scotia general election: Halifax Fairview
Party	Candidate	Votes	%	±%
New Democratic	Alexa McDonough	4,789	45.52%	–
Liberal	Art Flynn	3,558	33.82%	–
Progressive Conservative	Rosanna Liberatore	2,078	19.75%	–
Natural Law	Mark Hawkins	96	0.91%	–
Total		10,521	–	
Source(s) Source: Nova Scotia Legislature (2024). "Electoral History for Halifax Fairview" (PDF). nslegislature.ca. Nova Scotia, Chief Electoral Officer (1993). Returns of the General Election for the House of Assembly, Thirty-Third General Election (PDF) (Report). Queen's Printer. Archived from the original (PDF) on 18 June 2018.

== See also ==
- List of Nova Scotia provincial electoral districts
- Canadian provincial electoral districts
