= Suzy Hansen (politician) =

Canadian politician

Suzy Hansen MLA

Chief Whip of the Nova Scotia New Democratic Party
- Incumbent
- Assumed office September 7, 2021
- Leader: Gary Burrill and Claudia Chender

Critic: Education and Early Childhood Development; Housing; African Nova Scotian Affairs; Office of Equity & Anti-Racism Initiatives; Immigration; Service Nova Scotia and Internal Services
- Incumbent
- Assumed office September 7, 2021
- Leader: Gary Burrill and Claudia Chender

Member of the Nova Scotia House of Assembly for Halifax Needham
- Incumbent
- Assumed office August 17, 2021
- Preceded by: Lisa Roberts

Personal details
- Born: 1979 Halifax, Nova Scotia
- Party: NDP

Sue Ellen "Suzy" Hansen (born 1979) is a Canadian politician who was elected to the Nova Scotia House of Assembly in the 2021 Nova Scotia general election and re-elected in the 2024 Nova Scotia general election. She represents the riding of Halifax Needham as a member of the Nova Scotia New Democratic Party.

As of August 2025, Hansen serves as the Official Opposition critic for Housing, African Nova Scotian Affairs, the Office of Equity and Anti-Racism, the Human Rights Commission, and Communications Nova Scotia. She also serves as the Caucus Whip.

In 2026, Hansen endorsed Rob Ashton in that year's federal NDP leadership race.

Prior to her election, Hansen was a former board member of the Halifax Regional School Board and other boards and an active volunteer. She was also one of four Black Canadians elected to the Nova Scotia legislature in 2021 and 2024.

== Electoral record ==
2024 Nova Scotia general election: Halifax Needham
Party	Candidate	Votes	%	±%
New Democratic	Suzy Hansen	5,063	67.76	+8.79
Progressive Conservative	Trayvone Clayton	1,279	17.12	+7.08
Liberal	Jon Frost	1,003	13.42	-15.65
Green	Amethyste Hamel-Gregory	127	1.70	-0.22
Total		7,472	–	
Total rejected ballots		47		
Turnout		7,587	43.49	
Eligible voters		17,446		
New Democratic hold		Swing		
Source: Elections Nova Scotia

2021 Nova Scotia general election: Halifax Needham
Party	Candidate	Votes	%	±%
New Democratic	Suzy Hansen	5,308	58.96	+7.67
Liberal	Colin Coady	2,617	29.07	+0.65
Progressive Conservative	Scott Ellis	904	10.04	-4.36
Green	Kai Trappenberg	173	1.92	-3.97
Total valid votes		9,002	99.52	
Total rejected, unmarked, and declined ballots		43	0.48	
Turnout		9,045	53.34	
Eligible voters		16,957		
New Democratic hold		Swing		+3.51
Source: Elections Nova Scotia
