= Graham Steele =

Canadian lawyer and politician (born 1964)

The Honourable Graham Steele ECNS

Member of the Nova Scotia House of Assembly for Halifax Fairview
- In office March 6, 2001 – October 8, 2013
- Preceded by: Eileen O'Connell
- Succeeded by: Lena Diab

Minister of Finance
- In office June 19, 2009 – May 30, 2012
- Premier: Darrell Dexter
- Preceded by: Jamie Muir
- Succeeded by: Maureen MacDonald

Minister of Acadian Affairs
- In office June 19, 2009 – May 30, 2012
- Premier: Darrell Dexter
- Preceded by: Chris d'Entremont
- Succeeded by: Dave Wilson

Minister of Economic and Rural Development and Tourism
- In office May 10, 2013 – October 22, 2013
- Premier: Darrell Dexter
- Preceded by: Percy Paris
- Succeeded by: Michel Samson

Personal details
- Born: July 6, 1964 (age 62) Winnipeg, Manitoba, Canada
- Party: NDP
- Occupation: Lawyer
- Website: www.grahamsteele.ca

Graham J. Steele (July 8, 1964, Winnipeg, Manitoba) is a Canadian lawyer, author, and former politician, having represented the constituency of Halifax Fairview in the Nova Scotia House of Assembly from 2001 to 2013 for the Nova Scotia New Democratic Party. In January 2021, he began service as the Information and Privacy Commissioner for Nunavut.

== Early life and education ==
A native of Winnipeg, Steele graduated with a BA from the University of Manitoba and was recipient of the Governor General's Silver Medal. Steele received a Rhodes Scholarship and attended St Edmund Hall, Oxford University, graduating in 1986 with a degree in philosophy, politics, and economics. Steele moved to Halifax in fall 1986 to attend Dalhousie Law School and graduated with an LLB in 1989.

== Legal career ==
Steele practised law with Stewart McKelvey Stirling Scales in Halifax from 1989 to 1993 and was General Counsel to the Nova Scotia Workers Compensation Board from 1993 to 1998. Steele was Research Director for the Nova Scotia New Democratic Party's caucus office from 1998 to 2001.

Steele has done workshops in Montenegro, Bosnia and Herzegovina, Kosovo and the Middle East for the National Democratic Institute for International Affairs.

== Political career ==
In 2001 Steele successfully ran for the Nova Scotia New Democratic Party nomination in the riding of Halifax Fairview. He was elected in a by-election in March 2001, winning the seat with 58.17% of the vote. Steele was re-elected in the 2003, (45.85%) 2006 (58.51%) and 2009 provincial elections (63.71%).

While in official opposition, Steele served as the NDP's critic for Finance, Environment, Acadian Affairs, Insurance Act, and Treasury and Policy Board. He also served as Deputy House Leader. During this time, Steele also served on the Select Committee on Democratic Participation and was Chair of the Public Accounts Committee.

On June 19, 2009, Steele was appointed to the Executive Council of Nova Scotia where he served as Minister of Finance as well as Minister of Acadian Affairs. On May 30, 2012, Steele resigned from cabinet and announced that he would not be re-offering in the next election. Steele was appointed an honorary member of the Executive Council of Nova Scotia on May 31, 2012.

Steele was re-appointed to the Executive Council of Nova Scotia on May 10, 2013 where he took over as Minister of Economic and Rural Development and Tourism, as well as Minister of African Nova Scotian Affairs following the resignation of Percy Paris. Steele served in the Executive Council of Nova Scotia until October 22, 2013.

== Life after politics ==
He became a broadcaster on CBC Information Morning, providing a weekly political commentary. In September 2014, he released a memoir called What I Learned About Politics: Inside the Rise — and Collapse – of Nova Scotia's NDP Government. The book was a shortlisted nominee for the 2015 Shaughnessy Cohen Prize for Political Writing.

Steele taught at the Rowe School of Business at Dalhousie University from 2016 to 2019.

== Personal life ==
Steele is an Esperantist, having offered part of his legislative website in Esperanto, and has commemorated Nova Scotia Esperantists in the Nova Scotia House of Assembly. He is married to Tilly Pillay and they have two children.
