= Howard Epstein =

Canadian politician

MLA for Halifax Chebucto
- In office March 24, 1998 – October 8, 2013
- Preceded by: Jay Abbass
- Succeeded by: Joachim Stroink

Personal details
- Born: January 17, 1949 (age 77) Halifax, Nova Scotia
- Party: NDP

Howard Michael Epstein (born January 17, 1949) is a Canadian politician, lawyer and part-time law professor.

== Early life and career ==
Born in Halifax, Nova Scotia, he is an environmentalist, serving as the director of the Ecology Action Centre in Halifax from 1991-1994. Epstein was a student of the Halifax Grammar School.

== Political career ==
First elected to Halifax City Council in 1994, he was re-elected in 1996 with the formation of the Halifax Regional Municipality. Epstein sat as the Councillor for District 14 (Connaught-Quinpool), representing the city's West End. On March 24, 1998, Epstein was elected to the Nova Scotia House of Assembly for the New Democratic Party representing the provincial riding of Halifax Chebucto. He was re-elected in the 1999, 2003, 2006, and 2009 general elections.

Prior to June 2009, he was the NDP Critic for Conserve Nova Scotia, Intergovernmental Affairs, Gaming and the Heritage Property Act.

Epstein was shut out of the Cabinet by Premier Darrell Dexter when the NDP first formed government in June 2009. He was shut out of Cabinet a second time when Dexter shuffled his cabinet on May 30, 2012.

Epstein was the Ministerial Assistant for the Department of Community Services, specifically co-operative housing and other housing programs.

On January 15, 2013, Epstein announced that he would not be re-offering in the next Nova Scotia general election.

On March 20, 2015, Empty Mirrors Press published Epstein's political memoir "Rise Again: Nova Scotia's NDP on the Rocks" an account of his 15 years in provincial politics, the history of the New Democratic Party in Nova Scotia, and his analysis of the successes and failures of the Dexter NDP government during its term in office.
