= Eileen O'Connell (politician) =

Canadian politician (1947–2000)

MLA for Halifax Fairview
- In office July 8, 1996 – September 27, 2000
- Preceded by: Alexa McDonough
- Succeeded by: Graham Steele

Personal details
- Born: July 5, 1947 Halifax, Nova Scotia
- Died: September 27, 2000 (aged 53) Halifax, Nova Scotia
- Party: NDP
- Occupation: teacher

Eileen O'Connell (July 5, 1947 – September 27, 2000) was a Canadian politician who served as the Member of the Nova Scotia House of Assembly for Halifax Fairview from 1996 until her death in 2000 from breast cancer. She belonged to the New Democratic Party.

O'Connell was born in 1947 in Halifax, Nova Scotia, and raised in Antigonish. A graduate of St. Francis Xavier University, O'Connell attended both Dalhousie and St. Mary's Universities, where she earned a degree in Education.

She taught at Halifax West High School for 14 years, and then at Cornwallis Junior High School. She was a founding member of the Association for Media Literacy, a board member of the Planned Parenthood Metro Clinic, and a chair of the Halifax Association for Community Living's Flowers of Hope Campaign.

== Political life ==
O'Connell held various positions with the New Democratic Party before becoming an MLA. She first ran in the 1984 and 1988 elections in the constituency of Halifax Citadel but was unsuccessful. In the 1993 election, she made a third unsuccessful run at a seat, this time in the riding of Halifax Chebucto, losing a close race to Liberal Jay Abbass.

O'Connell ran successfully in the 1996 Halifax Fairview by-election prompted by the resignation of Alexa McDonough. She gained the seat with 65.24% of the vote. She was sworn-in as MLA on July 8, 1996. O'Connell's first day in the House of Assembly was November 18, 1996.

O'Connelll retained the seat in 1998 (53.8%) and 1999 (46.23%).

During her tenure as MLA, O'Connell served as Education Critic, Environment Critic, Natural Resources Critic and Forestry Critic for the NDP caucus. She also served on the Human Resources Subcommittee, Standing Committee on Resources, Public Accounts Committee, the Standing Committee on Veteran's Affairs, and the Select Committee on National Unity. At the Nova Scotia NDP Leadership convention in July 2000, she was a member of Helen MacDonald's team, and helped her win the leadership of the Nova Scotia NDP. Shortly after the 1998 election, O'Connell was diagnosed with breast cancer. She continued to serve as MLA until her death on September 27, 2000.

== Legacy ==
A memorial bursary in her name is awarded to a Halifax West High School student and to a J. L. Ilsley High School student each year.
