= Gerry O'Malley =

Canadian politician (1927–2018)

The Honourable Gerry O'Malley ECNS

MLA for Halifax Needham
- In office 1988–1998
- Preceded by: Edmund L. Morris
- Succeeded by: Maureen MacDonald

Personal details
- Born: Gerald Joseph O'Malley; 25 November 1927 Halifax, Nova Scotia, Canada
- Died: 16 November 2018 (aged 90) Halifax, Nova Scotia, Canada
- Party: Liberal
- Spouse: Marie Elizabeth Langan (m. 1953)
- Occupation: Educator

Gerald Joseph O'Malley (25 November 1927 – 16 November 2018) was a Canadian politician. He represented the electoral district of Halifax Needham in the Nova Scotia House of Assembly from 1988 to 1998, as a member of the Liberals.

An avid educational advocate, O’Malley worked at Nova Scotia Community College as a principal before entering politics. He served in the Nova Scotia Assembly for a decade and became the minister of supply and services and then minister of science and technology under the premier, John Savage.

== Early life ==
O'Malley was born in Halifax in 1927 to Michael O'Malley and Mary Brackett. He was educated at Saint Mary's University, originally wanting to be an electrician. He was in the Royal Canadian Air Force, retiring in 1967.

An avid educational advocate, O'Malley was a vocational teacher and later a principal at the Akerley campus of the Nova Scotia Community College in Halifax.

== Career ==
In 1980, O'Malley was elected to Halifax City Council, where he was deputy mayor in 1984.

O'Malley entered provincial politics in the 1988 election, defeating New Democrat Maureen MacDonald by 776 votes in the Halifax Needham riding. He was re-elected in the 1993 election, defeating his New Democrat opponent by 972 votes. He served as a backbench member of John Savage's government until March 1995, when he was appointed to the Executive Council of Nova Scotia as Minister of Supply and Services.

In March 1996, O'Malley was shuffled to minister of science and technology. When Russell MacLellan was sworn-in as premier in July 1997, O'Malley was moved to minister of labour.

O’Malley was moved to the labour portfolio, where he brought in safety training changes in the wake of the Westray mining disaster that resulted in 26 deaths. During his time as minister of supply and services, O'Malley once faced public criticism and outcry when he was in Sydney to announce the plan to cap the tar ponds. Protesters forced him to cut short the event and he was escorted out of the room due to security concerns as the protests intensified.

Despite indications he might retire, O'Malley ran for re-election in 1998, but was defeated by New Democrat Maureen MacDonald by over 2,300 votes.

== Personal life ==
O'Malley married Marie Elizabeth Langan in 1953. They had four children. He continued to live in Nova Scotia until his death at his Halifax home on 16 November 2018, nine days before his 91st birthday.
