= Lisa Roberts (politician) =

Canadian politician

Member of the Nova Scotia House of Assembly for Halifax Needham
- In office August 30, 2016 – July 17, 2021
- Preceded by: Maureen MacDonald
- Succeeded by: Suzy Hansen

Personal details
- Party: New Democratic (federal); New Democratic (Nova Scotia)

Lisa Roberts is a Canadian politician, who was elected to the Nova Scotia House of Assembly in a by-election on August 30, 2016. She represented the electoral district of Halifax Needham as a member of the Nova Scotia New Democratic Party until 2021.

She was re-elected in the 2017 provincial election.

Roberts announced in February 2021 that she would seek nomination as the NDP candidate for Halifax in the next federal election, but continue her role as MLA until either the next federal or provincial election, whichever came first. She represented the NDP in the 2021 federal election but finished second, behind Andy Fillmore of the Liberal Party. In November 2023, Roberts was again nominated as the NDP candidate for Halifax in the next federal election. she lost placing third.

Before entering politics, Roberts had been executive director of Veith House, and a journalist with CBC Radio’s Information Morning in Halifax. She has been involved in several Halifax community initiatives, like the community garden on Needham Hill.

== Electoral record ==
=== Federal ===
2025 Canadian federal election: Halifax
Party	Candidate	Votes	%	±%	Expenditures
Liberal	Shannon Miedema	32,886	63.05	+20.81	
Conservative	Mark Boudreau	9,939	19.05	+6.30	
New Democratic	Lisa Roberts	8,642	16.57	-23.72	
Green	Amethyste Hamel-Gregory	422	0.81	-1.40	
People's	Maricar Aliasut	271	0.52	-1.59	
Total valid votes/expense limit		52,160	99.31	-0.07	123,770.95
Total rejected ballots		365	0.69	+0.07	
Turnout		52,525	73.49		
Eligible voters (Note: Number of eligible voters does not include election day registrations.)		71,469			
Liberal hold		Swing		+7.26	
Source: Elections Canada

2021 Canadian federal election: Halifax
Party	Candidate	Votes	%	±%	Expenditures
Liberal	Andy Fillmore	21,905	42.74	+0.27	$103,501.55
New Democratic	Lisa Roberts	20,347	39.70	+9.66	$90,503.01
Conservative	Cameron Ells	6,601	12.88	+1.30	$2,924.56
Green	Jo-Ann Roberts	1,128	2.20	–12.17	$12,448.57
People's	B. Alexander Hébert	1,069	2.09	+0.95	$3,500.64
Communist	Katie Campbell	198	0.39	–	$0.00
Total valid votes/expense limit		51,248	99.38		$108,761.04
Total rejected ballots		322	0.62	–0.02	
Turnout		51,570	66.06	–6.96	
Registered voters		78,065			
Liberal hold		Swing		–4.70	
Source: Elections Canada

=== Provincial ===
2017 Nova Scotia general election: Halifax Needham
Party	Candidate	Votes	%	±%
New Democratic	Lisa Roberts	3,880	51.36	+0.43
Liberal	Melinda Daye	2,075	27.47	-6.13
Progressive Conservative	Matthew Donahoe	1,135	15.02	+2.86
Green	Andrew Jamieson	465	6.15	+2.94
Total valid votes		7,555	99.42	-0.16
Total rejected, unmarked, and declined ballots		44	0.58	+0.16
Turnout		7,599	46.16	+13.66
Eligible voters		16,558		
New Democratic hold		Swing		

Nova Scotia provincial by-election, August 30, 2016: Halifax Needham Resignation of Maureen MacDonald
Party	Candidate	Votes	%	±%
New Democratic	Lisa Roberts	2,519	50.97	+6.98
Liberal	Rod Wilson	1,662	33.63	-6.77
Progressive Conservative	Andy Arsenault	600	12.14	+1.32
Green	Thomas Trappenberg	161	3.26	-1.53
Total valid votes		4,942	99.58	+0.50
Total rejected, unmarked, and declined ballots		21	0.42	-0.50
Turnout		4,963	32.50	-17.93
Eligible voters		15,270		
New Democratic hold		Swing		+6.87
