= Rod Wilson (politician) =

Canadian politician

Member of the Nova Scotia House of Assembly for Halifax Armdale
- Incumbent
- Assumed office November 26, 2024
- Preceded by: Ali Duale

Personal details
- Born: Rodney David Wilson
- Party: Nova Scotia New Democratic Party
- Other political affiliations: Liberal (2016 - 2021 or 2022)
- Profession: Physician

Rodney David Wilson is a Canadian politician who was elected to the Nova Scotia House of Assembly in the 2024 general election, representing Halifax Armdale as a member of the Nova Scotia New Democratic Party.

Wilson serves as the Official Opposition critic for Health and Wellness, Emergency Management, and Seniors and Long-Term Care.

== Career ==
Wilson graduated from the Michael G. DeGroote School of Medicine in 1992 and is a medical doctor by profession. He previously ran as a Nova Scotia Liberal Party candidate in Halifax Needham in a 2016 by-election, switching to the NDP in 2024 due to his support of NDP leader Claudia Chender.

Wilson endorsed Alberta MP Heather McPherson in the 2026 New Democratic Party leadership election.

Openly gay, he is the province's first out gay male MLA, as Cecil Clarke was not out as gay during his term in the legislature.

== Electoral record ==
2024 Nova Scotia general election: Halifax Armdale
Party	Candidate	Votes	%	±%
New Democratic	Rod Wilson	2,521	39.40	+5.04
Progressive Conservative	Craig Myra	2,280	35.64	+13.36
Liberal	Ali Duale	1,597	24.96	-15.72
Total		6,398	–	
Total rejected ballots		45		
Turnout		6,443	44.66	
Eligible voters		14,426		
New Democratic gain		Swing		
Source: Elections Nova Scotia

Halifax Needham August 30, 2016 by-election
Party	Candidate	Votes	%	±%
New Democratic Party	Lisa Roberts	2,519	50.97	+6.98
Liberal	Rod Wilson	1,662	33.63	-6.77
Progressive Conservative	Andy Arsenault	600	12.14	+1.32
Green	Thomas Trappenberg	161	3.26	-1.53
Total valid votes		4,942	100.00	
Total rejected ballots		21	0.42	-0.50
Turnout		4,963	32.50	-17.93
Electors on the lists		15,270	–	
New Democratic hold		Swing		+6.87
