= Joachim Stroink =

Canadian politician

Member of the Nova Scotia House of Assembly for Halifax Chebucto
- In office October 8, 2013 – May 30, 2017
- Preceded by: Howard Epstein
- Succeeded by: Gary Burrill

Personal details
- Born: April 24, 1972 (age 54) Montreal, Quebec
- Party: Liberal
- Spouse: April Barkhouse-Stroink

Joachim Stroink (born April 24, 1972) is a Canadian politician who was elected to the Nova Scotia House of Assembly in the 2013 provincial election. A member of the Nova Scotia Liberal Party, he represented the electoral district of Halifax Chebucto until 2017.

== Personal life ==
Stroink attended LeMarchant-St. Thomas Elementary School and Halifax Central Junior High (then named Cornwallis Junior High School). He attended Queen Elizabeth High School (Halifax) and King's-Edgehill School. He graduated from Saint Mary's University in 1999 with a degree in Geography.

== Community involvement ==
He joined a number of successful local businesses in launching a petition to save the Emera Oval after the 2011 Canada Winter Games.

Stroink also served as President of the Learning Disabilities Association of Nova Scotia as a person living with attention deficit hyperactivity disorder and severe dyslexia. In 2015, he floundered about on stage for Bridgeway Academy's Dancing for our Stars fundraising event to highlight the struggles of those living with ADHD and Dyslexia.

He was a key figure in the development of the Blue Nose Marathon, named its Race Director in 2004, a position he held for four years, he remains a volunteer at the event. He ran the full marathon in its inaugural year.

Stroink is a founding partner of the Brigadoon Village camp for children with chronic illnesses. He donated office space in the Trail Shop to help get the camp off the ground. He has been a member of the board and a volunteer. As MLA for Halifax Chebucto he has hosted community BBQs during the Quinpool Road Business Association's annual Quinfest event with proceeds going to the camp. His primary involvement since 2014 has been as an organizer of Brigaswim, a fundraising event for the camp that involves a marathon swim around Georges Island (Nova Scotia) in Halifax Harbour. Stroink came up with the idea on the heels of the Halifax Harbour clean-up.

He joined other representatives of the Government of Nova Scotia to launch the government's annual United Way fundraising campaign in September 2016 by swimming across Halifax Harbour.

Stroink is also the co-founder of the iconic Not Since Moses run which takes place in the floor of the Bay of Fundy.

Stroink is actively involved with the Canadian Sport Climbing community. He has served on the board of directors of Climbing Escalade Canada since 2019 and has been chair of the board since 2022.

== Political career ==
Stroink was the MLA in the Halifax Chebucto riding in the Liberal government of Stephen McNeil from 2013 to 2017. As MLA he had been active on a number of key government initiatives and issues.

Stroink made the development of the Ocean Tech sector a key part of his mandate as MLA. As Chair of the Standing Committee on Economic Development.

Stroink spearheaded a project in his constituency inspired by local municipal Participatory Budgeting programs where he sought input from constituents on the development of a community-driven Private Members' Bill coining the term Community Members' Bill.

In 2015, Halifax area businesses spoke out when faced with commercial tax increases they deemed unfair. Stroink joined Labi Kousoulis, MLA for Halifax Citadel-Sable Island and Minister of Internal Services, in calling on Municipal Affairs Minister Zach Churchill to make changes to the tax system. The call was supported by Municipal officials and resulted in amendments to the HRM Charter that allowed changes to the Halifax Regional Municipality's commercial tax system.

He has also been an advocate of the Select Nova Scotia campaign encouraging people to buy local and actively supporting the expansion of the program.

== Gender equality ==
Both in and out of the legislature Stroink has been an advocate for gender equality. He has publicly supported the United Nations' He for She campaign calling on men across Nova Scotia to participate actively in the struggle for gender equality.

Stroink called on members of the Nova Scotia legislature to donate to the campaign on Pay Equity Day in 2015.

== Black face controversy ==
In December 2013 Stroink came under controversy after being photographed sitting on the lap of a man in black face dressed as Black Peter (Zwarte Piet) at a local Dutch Christmas party.

== Electoral record ==
2013 Nova Scotia general election
Party	Candidate	Votes	%	±%
Liberal	Joachim Stroink	4,352	49.87	
New Democratic Party	Gregor Ash	3,376	38.68	
Progressive Conservative	Christine Dewell	874	10.02	
Independent	Michael Marshall	125	1.43	
