= Ali Duale =

Canadian politician

Member of the Nova Scotia House of Assembly for Halifax Armdale
- In office August 17, 2021 – October 27, 2024
- Preceded by: Lena Diab
- Succeeded by: Rod Wilson

Personal details
- Born: Somalia
- Party: Liberal

Ali Duale is a Canadian politician, who was elected to the Nova Scotia House of Assembly in the 2021 Nova Scotia general election. He represented the riding of Halifax Armdale as a member of the Nova Scotia Liberal Party until 2024.

== Biography ==
Originally from Somalia, Duale came to Canada as a refugee from the Somali Civil War, and has worked for the Halifax Regional Fire and Emergency. He was one of four Black Canadians elected to the Nova Scotia legislature in 2021.

Duale was member of the Human Resources and Veterans Affairs Committees.

From September 22, 2024, to his 2024 electoral defeat, Duale served as the Official Opposition critic for Communities, Culture, and Heritage.

== Electoral record ==
2024 Nova Scotia general election: Halifax Armdale
Party	Candidate	Votes	%	±%
New Democratic	Rod Wilson	2,521	39.40	+5.04
Progressive Conservative	Craig Myra	2,280	35.64	+13.36
Liberal	Ali Duale	1,597	24.96	-15.72
Total		6,398	–	
Total rejected ballots		45		
Turnout		6,443	44.66	
Eligible voters		14,426		
New Democratic gain		Swing		
Source: Elections Nova Scotia

2021 Nova Scotia general election: Halifax Armdale
Party	Candidate	Votes	%	±%	Expenditures
Liberal	Ali Duale	3,070	40.35	–3.22	$70,351.56
New Democratic	Julie Melanson	2,593	34.08	+1.33	$53,488.81
Progressive Conservative	Richard MacLean	1,681	22.09	+3.43	$26,722.37
Green	Jo-Ann Roberts	202	2.65	–1.26	$260.94
Independent	Stephen Chafe	63	0.83	–	$2,271.79
Total valid votes/expense limit		7,609	99.67	–	$82,778.45
Total rejected ballots		25	0.33		
Turnout		7,634	53.52		
Eligible voters		14,265			
Liberal hold		Swing		–2.28	
Source: Elections Nova Scotia
