= Lena Diab =

Canadian politician (born 1965)

The Honourable Lena Metlege Diab PC ECNS KC MP
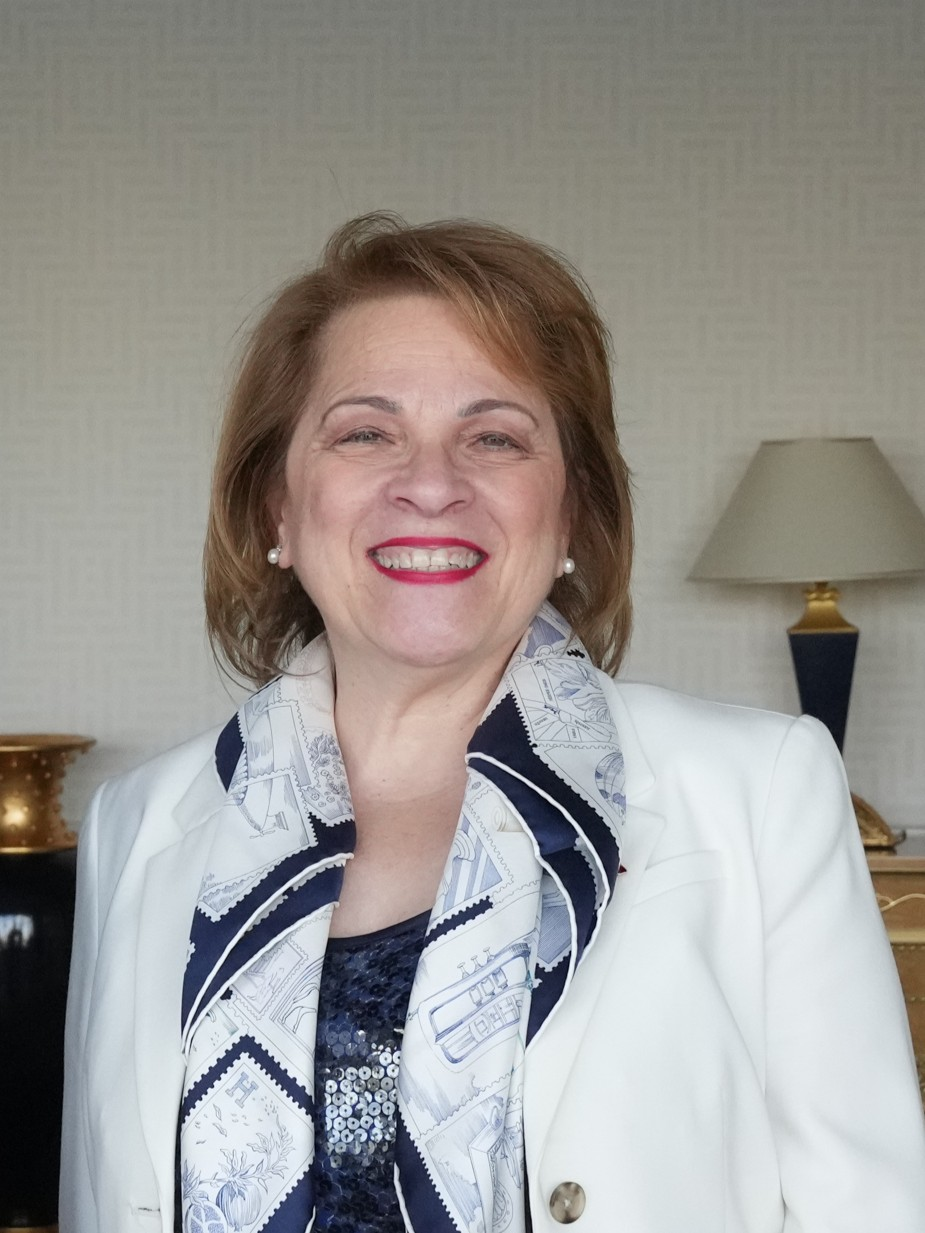
- Diab in 2026

Minister of Immigration, Refugees and Citizenship
- Incumbent
- Assumed office May 13, 2025
- Prime Minister: Mark Carney
- Preceded by: Rachel Bendayan

Member of Parliament for Halifax West—Peggy's Cove (Halifax West; 2021–2026)
- Incumbent
- Assumed office September 20, 2021
- Preceded by: Geoff Regan

Nova Scotia Minister of Justice Attorney General of Nova Scotia Provincial Secretary of Nova Scotia
- In office October 22, 2013 – July 24, 2015
- Premier: Stephen McNeil
- Preceded by: Ross Landry
- Succeeded by: Diana Whalen

Nova Scotia Minister of Immigration
- In office October 22, 2013 – August 31, 2021
- Premier: Stephen McNeil; Iain Rankin
- Preceded by: Frank Corbett
- Succeeded by: Jill Balser

Member of the Nova Scotia House of Assembly for Halifax Armdale
- In office October 8, 2013 – July 17, 2021
- Preceded by: Constituency established
- Succeeded by: Ali Duale

Personal details
- Born: August 17, 1965 (age 61) Halifax, Nova Scotia, Canada
- Party: Liberal
- Occupation: Lawyer

Lena Metlege Diab (born August 17, 1965) is a Canadian politician who has served as the minister of immigration, refugees and citizenship since 2025. A member of the Liberal Party, Diab was elected to the House of Commons in 2021 and serves as the member of Parliament (MP) for Halifax West—Peggy's Cove. She was previously a member of the Nova Scotia House of Assembly from 2013 to 2021.

Diab was elected to the Nova Scotia House of Assembly in the 2013 provincial election as a member of the Nova Scotia Liberal Party. She represented Halifax Armdale and served as the provincial immigration minister as well as minister of justice, attorney general and provincial secretary. She did not run for another term in the provincial legislature in the 2021 Nova Scotia general election, opting instead to run in the 2021 Canadian federal election for the Liberal Party of Canada, in which she was elected MP for Halifax West. She was re-elected in the 2025 federal election and was appointed Minister of Immigration, Refugees and Citizenship.

== Early life and career ==
Diab was born in Halifax, the daughter of first-generation Lebanese immigrants. She moved to Lebanon at age 2 but then moved back to Halifax at age 11, escaping the Lebanese Civil War.

Diab graduated from Saint Mary's University in 1985 with a Bachelor of Arts in economics and political science. She worked as a page at the Nova Scotia Legislature during this time.

She then attended Dalhousie University where she obtained her Master of Public Administration in 1987 and Bachelor of Laws in 1990. Diab practiced law and operated a small business in Halifax.

Diab is a noted community leader and volunteer. She is the recipient of the "Outstanding Professional of the Year" award (2010) from the Canadian Lebanese Chamber of Commerce and Industry. She has received the "Mainland North Champion Award" (2010). Diab was a recipient of the Queen Elizabeth II Diamond Jubilee Medal (2013). She received the "Nova Scotia Provincial Volunteer Award" (2013). She was appointed one of Her Majesty's counsel, learned in the law (Queen's Counsel) in 2018. She has served many years as the President of the Canadian Lebanon Society of Halifax, and oversaw the celebration of the 75th Anniversary celebrations held throughout Halifax in 2013. She has served as a volunteer in many other community organizations, including as a member of the parish council for Our Lady of Lebanon Maronite Catholic Church in Halifax.

== Political career ==
Diab sought and was elected in the riding of Halifax Armdale in the 2013 Nova Scotia general election for the Nova Scotia Liberal Party. On October 22, 2013, Diab was appointed to the Executive Council of Nova Scotia as Minister of Justice, as well as Attorney General, Minister of Immigration and various other cabinet responsibilities. She was the first female to hold the position of Attorney General in Nova Scotia, as well as the first Lebanese Canadian to hold a cabinet position in Nova Scotia.

On July 24, 2015, premier Stephen McNeil shuffled his cabinet with Diab being retained as Minister of Immigration, but being shuffled out as Minister of Justice.

On June 15, 2017, premier Stephen McNeil shuffled his cabinet, retaining Diab as Minister of Immigration, but giving her an additional role in cabinet as Minister of Acadian Affairs and Francophonie.

On October 13, 2020, premier Stephen McNeil shuffled his cabinet in response to the resignation of three Ministers who entered the leadership race to replace him. Diab was given an additional role in cabinet as Minister of Labour and Advanced Education.

On February 23, 2021, premier Iain Rankin was sworn in as Nova Scotia's 29th premier along with a new cabinet. Diab retained her roles as Minister of Labour and Advanced Education and Minister of Acadian Affairs and Francophonie, while also retaining the newly renamed role of Minister of Immigration and Population Growth.

In 2021, Diab did not seek re-election in the provincial legislature, instead being elected to succeed Geoff Regan in the House of Commons. After being re-elected in 2025, she was appointed to the 30th Canadian Ministry as Minister of Immigration, Refugees and Citizenship. In this portfolio, Diab has faced criticism for her weak performances at committee hearings and Question Period, low visibility as minister, and for revealing details about a new policy to a YouTube channel that supports new immigrants.

In October 2026 during an interview with Radio-Canada. Diab appeared to be unaware of Singh v Canada, a landmark ruling that; awarded the charter right of fundamental justice to asylum seekers, and led to the establishment of the Immigration and Refugee Board of Canada. She had previously declined to directly answer questions on the case in February when before two senate committees. This led to criticism from refugee advocates and human rights groups

== Electoral record ==
=== Federal elections ===
2025 Canadian federal election: Halifax West
Party	Candidate	Votes	%	±%	Expenditures
Liberal	Lena Metlege Diab	36,200	65.60	+18.04	$60,341.76
Conservative	Rob Batherson	15,020	27.22	+5.67	$76,728.19
New Democratic	Rae Tench	3,083	5.59	-20.41	$17,705.93
Green	Ron G. Parker	497	0.90	-1.55	$3,188.51
People's	Adam LeRue	384	0.70	-1.61	$2,080.03
Total valid votes		55,184	99.23	–0.30	$125,733.18
Total rejected ballots		426	0.77	+0.30	
Turnout		55,610	73.42	+9.12	
Eligible voters (Note: Number of eligible voters does not include election day registrations.)		75,745			
Liberal notional hold		Swing		+6.19	
Source: Elections Canada

2021 Canadian federal election: Halifax West
Party	Candidate	Votes	%	±%	Expenditures
Liberal	Lena Metlege Diab	24,744	48.49	-0.97	$83,716.15
New Democratic	Jonathan Keith Roberts	12,331	24.16	+4.97	$15,101.47
Conservative	Eleanor Humphries	11,243	22.03	+2.74	$51,584.17
People's	Julie Scott	1,447	2.84	–	$4,571.34
Green	Richard Zurawski	1,181	2.31	-9.75	$1,237.40
Christian Heritage	Kevin Schulthies	85	0.17	–	$164.00
Total valid votes/expense limit		51,031	100.00	–	$110,211.79
Total rejected ballots		191			
Turnout		51,222	64.97	-5.74	
Registered voters		78,839			
Liberal hold		Swing		-2.99	
Source: Elections Canada

=== Provincial elections ===
2017 Nova Scotia general election: Halifax Armdale
Party	Candidate	Votes	%	±%
Liberal	Lena Diab	2,962	44.58	−4.76
New Democratic	David C. Wheeler	2,098	31.58	−2.76
Progressive Conservative	Sylvia Gillard	1,253	18.86	2.54
Green	Marc-André Tremblay	246	3.70	
Atlantica	Michael McLeod	85	1.28	
Total valid votes		6,644	100	
Total rejected ballots		23	0.35	
Turnout		6,667	53.50	
Eligible voters		12,461		
Liberal hold		Swing		−1.00
Source: Elections Nova Scotia

2013 Nova Scotia general election
Party	Candidate	Votes	%	±%
Liberal	Lena Diab	3,208	49.34	
New Democratic Party	Drew Moore	2,233	34.34	
Progressive Conservative	Irvine Carvery	1,061	16.32	

== Personal life ==
In January 2017, Diab's husband Maroun was charged with assault, uttering threats and choking his wife, as well as threatening two other people in relation to an incident that occurred at their home in Halifax on December 31, 2016. On March 23, 2017, her husband was found not criminally responsible for the incident after an assessment at the East Coast Forensic Hospital.

Order of precedence
Preceded by Julie Dabrusin as Member of the Cabinet	Order of Precedence of Canada as Member of the Cabinet	Succeeded by Mandy Gull-Masty as Member of the Cabinet
