= James L. Connolly =

Canadian politician

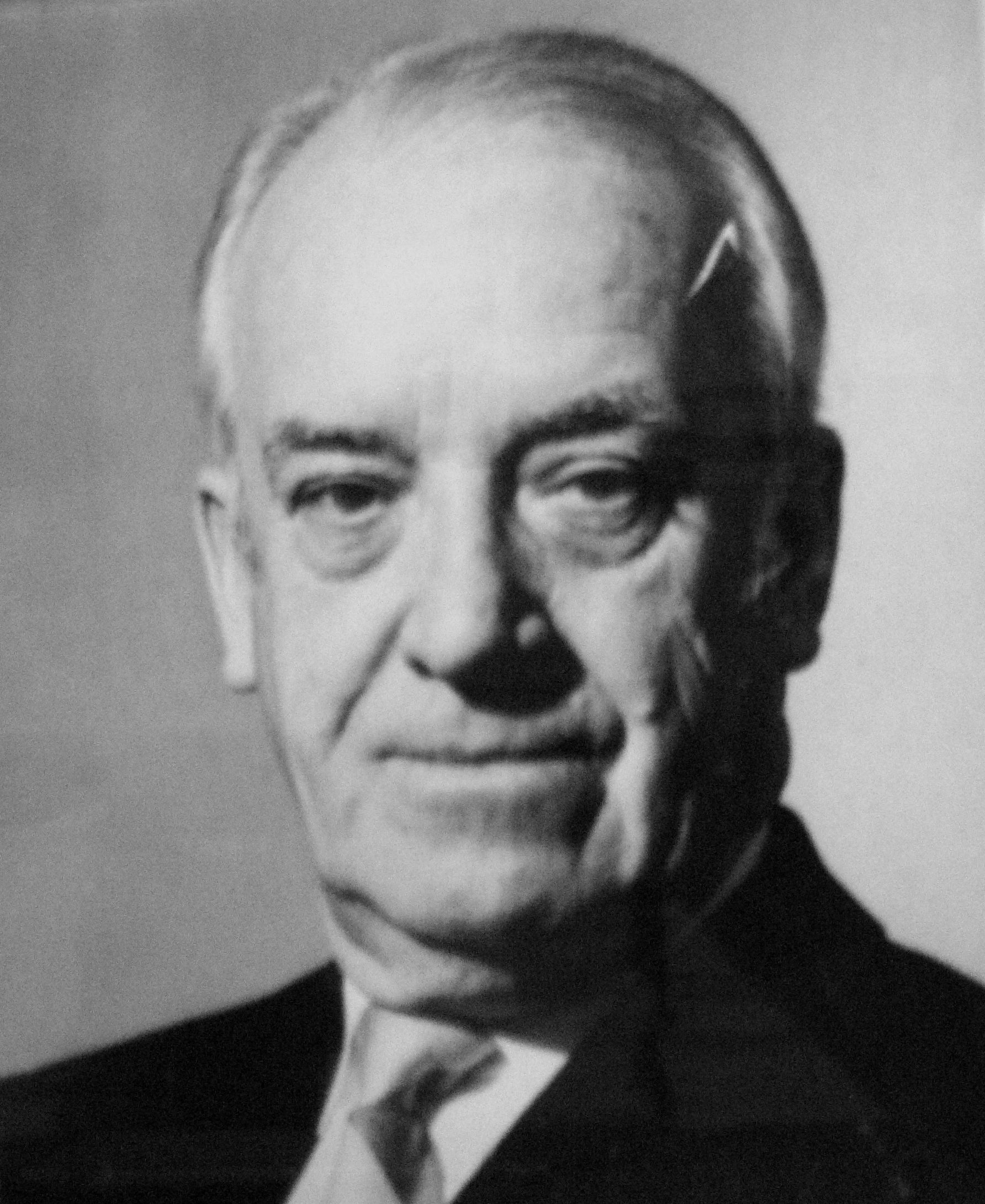
- Connolly, c. 1973

Speaker of the Nova Scotia House of Assembly
- In office 1973–1974
- Preceded by: George M. Mitchell
- Succeeded by: Vincent Maclean

MLA for Halifax Chebucto
- In office 1970–1974
- Preceded by: James H. Vaughan
- Succeeded by: Walter Fitzgerald

Personal details
- Born: c. 1909
- Died: March 6, 1982 Halifax, Nova Scotia
- Party: Liberal

James Lawrence Connolly (c. 1909 – March 6, 1982) was a Canadian politician, who was elected to the Nova Scotia House of Assembly in the 1970 provincial election. He represented the electoral district of Halifax Chebucto as a member of the Liberals.

He was chosen deputy speaker of the House of Assembly in December 1970 and became Speaker in November 1973. He retired from the legislature with the 1974 provincial election. Connolly was previously deputy mayor of Halifax, and served five terms as an alderman on city council. He operated his own plumbing business for 25 years.
