= Jay Abbass =

Canadian politician

The Honourable Jay Abbass ECNS

MLA for Halifax Chebucto
- In office 1993–1998
- Preceded by: Alexa McDonough
- Succeeded by: Howard Epstein

Personal details
- Born: 1957 (age 68–69) Fredericton, New Brunswick
- Party: Liberal

Jay Abbass (born 1957) is a lawyer, businessman, former stockbroker and former political figure in Nova Scotia, Canada. He represented Halifax Chebucto in the Nova Scotia House of Assembly from 1993 to 1998 as a Liberal member.

== Early life ==
He was born in Fredericton, New Brunswick and was educated at Saint Mary's University and Dalhousie University.

== Political career ==
Abbass was an unsuccessful candidate for a seat in the provincial assembly in the 1988 election, finishing third in the Halifax Citadel riding. In the 1993 election, he defeated New Democrat Eileen O'Connell by 106 votes in the Halifax Chebucto riding. He served in the Executive Council of Nova Scotia as Minister of Labour, Minister of Human Resources, Minister of Justice and Attorney General. Abbass resigned from cabinet on April 1, 1997, and announced he was not running in the next election.

== After politics ==
Abbass was named to the board of governors for Dalhousie University in 2006.
