= Jeremy Akerman =

English-Canadian politician, writer and actor (born 1942)

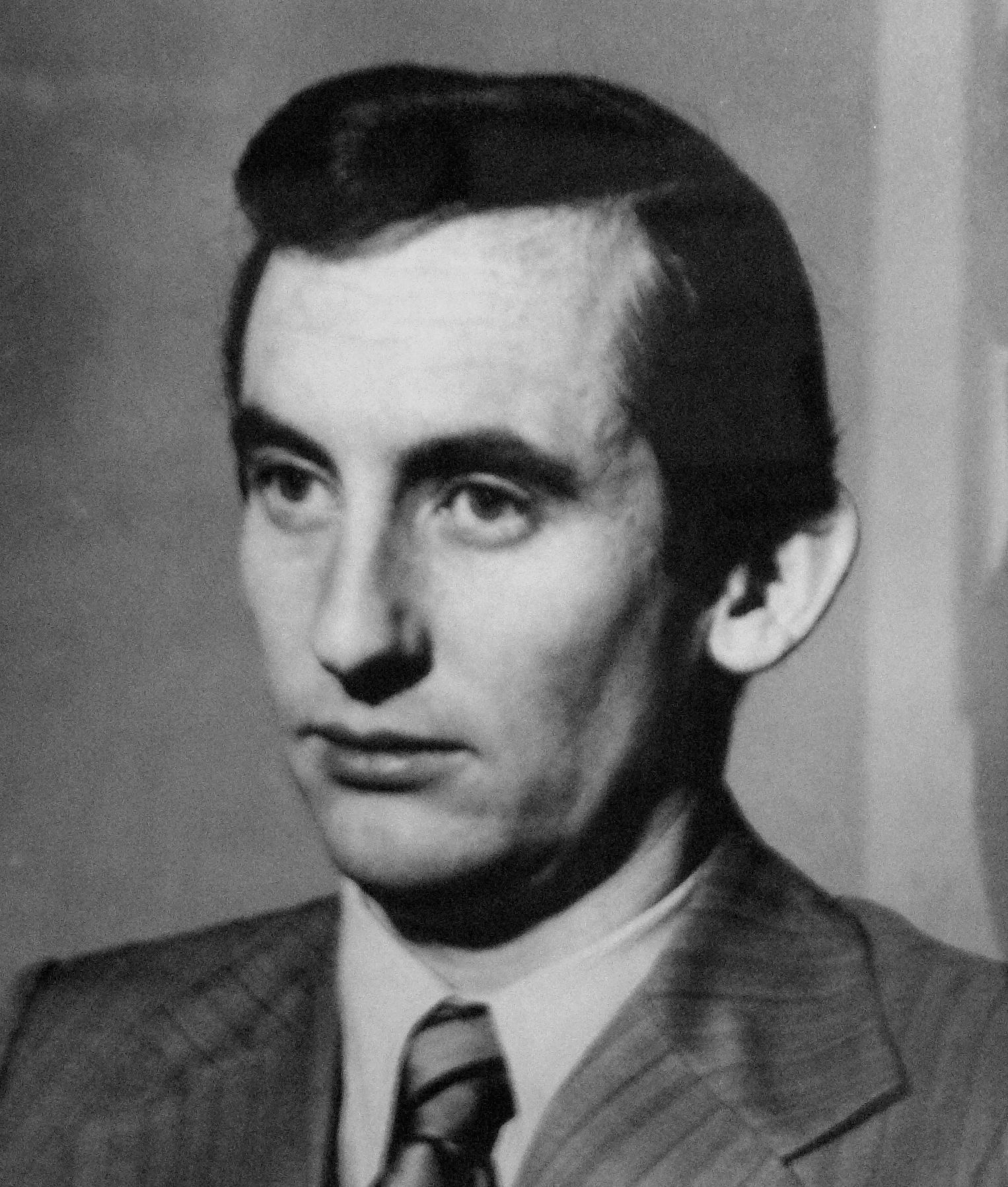
- Akerman, c. 1973

Leader of the Nova Scotia New Democratic Party
- In office 1968–1980
- Preceded by: James H. Aitchison
- Succeeded by: James 'Buddy' MacEachern
- Constituency: Nova Scotia

MLA for Cape Breton East
- In office 1970–1980
- Preceded by: Layton Fergusson
- Succeeded by: Donnie MacLeod

Personal details
- Born: Jeremy Bernard Akerman; May 28, 1942 (age 84) Alvechurch, England
- Party: New Democratic Party; Nova Scotia Liberal Party
- Occupation: Writer, actor

Jeremy Bernard Akerman (born May 28, 1942) is a former Canadian politician, writer and actor and a former leader of the Nova Scotia New Democratic Party.

== Early life ==
Akerman was born in Alvechurch, Worcestershire, United Kingdom. He was attracted to politics in his teens, being drawn to the Labour Party by the famous miners' leader Anuerin Bevan. He attended Marshfield Primary School in Castelton, Bassaleg Grammar School and Cardiff College of Art, all in South Wales where he studied painting, drawing and sculpture.

In 1964 Akerman was invited by the Canadian government to take the position of head of Archaeological Illustration at the Fortress of Louisbourg Restoration Project in Nova Scotia. While in Cape Breton he helped to organize fishermen in the Louisbourg area into an organization that eventually affiliated with the United Fishermen and Allied Workers' Union.

In 1967 he was the New Democratic Party candidate in Cape Breton West but came third. Later that year he became a reporter, news reader and talk show host at CHER Radio in Sydney but was fired for attempting to unionize the staff. For this he was made a life member of the International Alliance of Theatrical Stage Employees.

In 1968 Akerman ran as the NDP federal candidate in Cape Breton—East Richmond, but again came third. Later that year, he ran in the 1968 Nova Scotia New Democratic Party leadership election and won by four votes over professor Keith Jobson. Two years later, Akerman was elected to the legislature for the riding of Cape Breton East (Glace Bay). He was re-elected in 1974 and 1978. In 1980 he resigned both his seat and the party leadership to become head of Intergovernmental Affairs for Nova Scotia in the government of premier John M. Buchanan. Subsequently, he was appointed Executive Director and Secretary to the cabinet's Policy Board. He also held the positions Special Adviser to the Minister of the Environment and Manager of the Film Development Fund. In 1990, he was dismissed by the incoming premier Donald Cameron. In the 1980s, Akerman had also become active in community theatre, directing and/or appearing over 30 productions, and was president of the Nova Scotia Drama League and Theatre Arts Guild.

After he left the government in 1990, Akerman became editor of the Metro Weekly newspaper in addition to turning his hand to film acting. The newspaper closed its doors after a few years, but Akerman's film career continued. As of January 2014, he had worked on 128 film shoots, 119 of them in leading, supporting or principal roles.

Akerman is also a portrait and landscape painter, specializing in Welsh and Nova Scotia scenes, having exhibited in Halifax, Cape Breton, and Lunenburg.

In December 2013, Akerman formed XMLAS, an association for former Members of the Legislature, and was elected its first president. He lives in Halifax, Nova Scotia.

== Political career ==
In the provincial election of May 30, 1967, Akerman ran for the first time as an NDP candidate, in the constituency of Cape Breton West, and won 13 per cent of the vote. In the following year, he ran as the party's candidate in the federal election in Cape Breton—East Richmond, and won 7,750 votes. He placed third, but in Glace Bay, Akerman won three wards out of six. He decided to run in the Glace Bay provincial constituency in the next provincial election.

Later in 1968, the NDP held a convention at Sydney, at which Akerman sought the party's provincial leadership. He was opposed by law professor Keith Jobson of Halifax, who was backed by outgoing leader James H. Aitchison, and won the contest by four votes becoming party leader at the age of 26.

The next provincial election was held October 13, 1970. Akerman was elected in Glace Bay with a majority of 1,527 votes. Sydney school teacher Paul MacEwan was also elected, so the party held two seats in the Legislature until 1974. In the vote held April 2, 1974, Akerman and MacEwan were both re-elected, along with a third candidate, James 'Buddy' MacEachern, who ran in Cape Breton Centre, a riding sandwiched between Akerman's seat and MacEwan's. And in the following provincial election, held September 19, 1978, these three were re-elected, and Len Arsenault won in the constituency of Cape Breton North, thus bringing the NDP presence in the Nova Scotia Legislature up to four seats.

During his years as head of the NDP in Nova Scotia, Akerman had met increased resistance to his efforts from the Halifax branch of the party which was critical of the party's inability to win seats on the mainland. Through gaining a majority of seats on the party's provincial executive, the Halifax group came to dominate the party, even although they were unable win a seat in the Legislature. Akerman also faced strains on his health and personal life, due to the stress of the workload he carried; he missed the 1977 session of the House because of an illness and his marriage ended in divorce. By 1980, reportedly tired after 12 years at the helm of the party, he announced his retirement. At the time he was the longest-serving NDP leader anywhere in Canada.

Soon afterwards, Akerman received a contract from the provincial government to become executive director of intergovernmental affairs. In order to accept a job in the civil service he severed his ties with the NDP. He worked in this position or other provincial government posts for the next eleven years. Following this, he served for a time as editor of the Metro Telecaster, then pursued a career in acting. He has appeared in at least 24 movies, including Cloudburst, Hobo with a Shotgun and Blackbird.

During his time as NDP leader in Nova Scotia, Akerman received praise from members of several political parties and was considered one of the most capable debaters in the House.

Akerman attempted a return to politics in a March 6, 2001 byelection in the provincial constituency of Halifax Fairview. This time running as candidate for the Nova Scotia Liberal Party, Akerman finished second behind NDP candidate Graham Steele.
