= John E. Ahern =

Canadian politician

MLA for Halifax North
- In office 1956–1963
- Preceded by: Harold Connolly
- Succeeded by: James H. Vaughan

Mayor of Halifax, Nova Scotia
- In office 1946–1949
- Preceded by: Allan MacDougall Butler
- Succeeded by: Gordon Stanley Kinley

Personal details
- Born: February 6, 1897 Halifax, Nova Scotia
- Died: April 4, 1969 (aged 72) Halifax, Nova Scotia
- Party: Nova Scotia Liberal Party
- Occupation: journalist

John Edward Ahern (February 6, 1897 – April 4, 1969) was a Canadian politician. He represented the electoral district of Halifax North in the Nova Scotia House of Assembly from 1956 to 1963. He was a member of the Nova Scotia Liberal Party.

Born in 1897 in Halifax, Nova Scotia, Ahern was educated at Saint Mary's University and Dalhousie Law School. He married Ellen Bourke in 1927. An active participant and promoter of sport in Nova Scotia, Ahern was posthumously inducted into the Nova Scotia Sport Hall of Fame in 1982.

Ahern was an alderman in Halifax from 1941 to 1946, serving as deputy mayor from 1943 to 1946. He served as mayor of Halifax from 1946 to 1949, and returned as an alderman from 1952 to 1956. He entered provincial politics in the 1956 election, winning the Halifax North riding. He was re-elected in 1960. In the 1963 election, Ahern was defeated by Progressive Conservative James H. Vaughan. Ahern died at Halifax on April 4, 1969.
