= Maureen MacDonald =

Canadian politician

The Honourable Maureen MacDonald ECNS

Member of the Nova Scotia House of Assembly for Halifax Needham
- In office March 24, 1998 – April 12, 2016
- Preceded by: Gerry O'Malley
- Succeeded by: Lisa Roberts

Leader of the Nova Scotia New Democratic Party Interim
- In office November 23, 2013 – February 27, 2016
- Preceded by: Darrell Dexter
- Succeeded by: Gary Burrill

Minister of Finance
- In office May 30, 2012 – October 22, 2013
- Preceded by: Graham Steele
- Succeeded by: Diana Whalen

Minister of Health
- In office June 19, 2009 – May 30, 2012
- Preceded by: Karen Casey
- Succeeded by: Dave Wilson

Minister of Health Promotion and Protection
- In office June 19, 2009 – January 11, 2011
- Preceded by: Pat Dunn
- Succeeded by: department merged

Minister of Gaelic Affairs
- In office June 19, 2009 – October 22, 2013
- Preceded by: Angus MacIsaac
- Succeeded by: Randy Delorey

Personal details
- Born: 1954 (age 71–72) Antigonish, Nova Scotia
- Party: NDP
- Occupation: social worker, professor

Maureen MacDonald (born 1954) is a Canadian academic and politician. She represented the riding of Halifax Needham in the Nova Scotia House of Assembly from 1998 to 2016. She served as the interim leader of the Nova Scotia New Democratic Party from November 23, 2013 to February 27, 2016.

== Early life and career ==
A native of Antigonish, MacDonald graduated in 1979 with a MSW from the Maritime School of Social Work at Dalhousie University. She was employed as a social worker at the Nova Scotia Hospital (Adolescent Services) and later was a faculty member at her alma mater where she taught social policy and community development. MacDonald also worked at Dalhousie Legal Aid, the North End Clinic and the North End Parent Resource Centre.

== Political career ==
MacDonald was first elected as MLA for Halifax Needham in the 1998 provincial election, after having previously run in the same riding in 1984 and 1988. She was subsequently re-elected in the 1999, 2003, 2006, 2009 and 2013 provincial elections.

MacDonald sought the leadership of the NS NDP in 2000, finishing a strong third.

On June 19, 2009 MacDonald was appointed to the Executive Council of Nova Scotia where she served as Minister of Health as well as Minister of Health Promotion and Protection. On May 30, 2012, Premier Darrell Dexter shuffled his cabinet, appointing MacDonald as Minister of Finance. On May 10, 2013 MacDonald was appointed Minister of African Nova Scotia Affairs.

MacDonald was one of only seven NDP MLAs returned in the 2013 provincial election in which the Dexter government was defeated. On November 16, 2013, it was announced that MacDonald would become the party's interim leader when Dexter steps down as leader on November 23, 2013.

On April 12, 2016, MacDonald announced she was resigning as MLA.

=== Electoral record ===
2013 Nova Scotia general election
Party	Candidate	Votes	%	±%
New Democratic Party	Maureen MacDonald	3,391	44.03	-23.80
Liberal	Chris Poole	3,115	40.45	+19.22
Progressive Conservative	Mary D.S. Hamblin	834	10.83	+4.65
Green	Kris MacLellan	361	4.69	-0.08

2009 Nova Scotia general election
Party	Candidate	Votes	%	±%
New Democratic Party	Maureen MacDonald	5,337	67.83	
Liberal	Graham Estabrooks	1,670	21.23	
Progressive Conservative	Jason Cameron	486	6.18	
Green	Kris MacLellan	375	4.77	–

2006 Nova Scotia general election
Party	Candidate	Votes	%	±%
New Democratic Party	Maureen MacDonald	4,438	60.62	
Progressive Conservative	Andrew Black	1,330	18.17	
Liberal	Dr. Errol Guam	1,220	16.66	
Green	Amanda Myers	333	4.55	–

2003 Nova Scotia general election
Party	Candidate	Votes	%	±%
New Democratic Party	Maureen MacDonald	3,709	50.26	
Liberal	Mike Rogers	2,178	29.51	
Progressive Conservative	Linda Carvery	1,377	18.66	
Nova Scotia Party	Blair Baxter	116	1.57	

1999 Nova Scotia general election
Party	Candidate	Votes	%	±%
New Democratic Party	Maureen MacDonald	3,525	44.95	
Progressive Conservative	Linda Carvery	2,185	27.86	
Liberal	Mike Rogers	1,970	25.12	
Nova Scotia Party	Scott Higgins	162	2.07	

1998 Nova Scotia general election
Party	Candidate	Votes	%	±%
New Democratic Party	Maureen MacDonald	4,837	58.51	
Liberal	Gerry O'Malley	2,506	30.31	
Progressive Conservative	Atho Kartsaklis	924	11.18	

1988 Nova Scotia general election
Party	Candidate	Votes	%	±%
Liberal	Gerry O'Malley	3,469	41.91	
New Democratic Party	Maureen MacDonald	2,693	32.53	
Progressive Conservative	Randy Dewell	2,116	25.56	

1984 Nova Scotia general election
Party	Candidate	Votes	%	±%
Progressive Conservative	Edmund Morris	3,173	39.97	
New Democratic Party	Maureen MacDonald	2,514	31.67	
Liberal	Walter Fitzgerald	2,208	27.81	
Labour	Bernice Kaizer	44	0.55	
