= Gary Burrill =

Canadian politician (born 1955)

The Reverend Gary Burrill
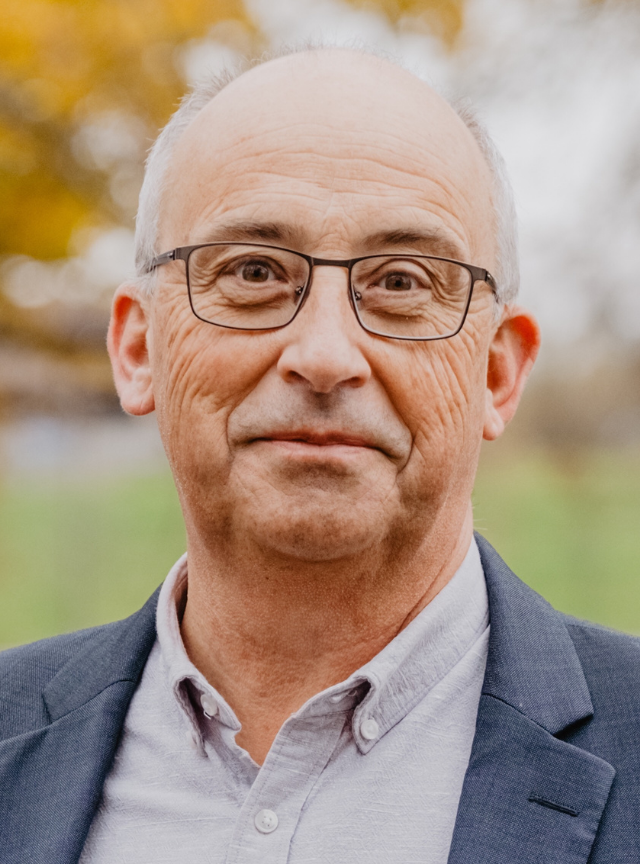

Leader of the Nova Scotia New Democratic Party
- In office February 27, 2016 – June 25, 2022
- Preceded by: Maureen MacDonald (Interim)
- Succeeded by: Claudia Chender

Member of the Nova Scotia House of Assembly for Halifax Chebucto
- In office May 30, 2017 – October 27, 2024
- Preceded by: Joachim Stroink
- Succeeded by: Krista Gallagher

Member of the Nova Scotia House of Assembly for Colchester-Musquodoboit Valley
- In office June 9, 2009 – October 8, 2013
- Preceded by: Brooke Taylor
- Succeeded by: Larry Harrison

Personal details
- Born: January 1, 1955 (age 71) Woodstock, New Brunswick
- Party: New Democrat
- Occupation: United Church minister

Gary Clayton Burrill (born January 1, 1955) is a Canadian politician and was the leader of the Nova Scotia New Democratic Party from 2016 until 2022. He served as leader during two Nova Scotia general elections in 2017 and 2021. He announced he'd be stepping down as leader after the 2021 election and was succeeded by Claudia Chender on June 25, 2022, although he continued to serve as an MLA until he decided not to run for re-election in 2024.

== Early life and education ==
Born in Woodstock, New Brunswick, his father was a United Church minister. In 1978, he graduated from Queen's University with a Masters of Arts in History. Burrill taught sociology at Mount Saint Vincent University, Saint Mary's University, and the Maritime School of Social Work. He later graduated with a Masters of Divinity from Harvard University, and in 1992 he was ordained as a minister in the United Church of Canada and became a minister in Upper Musquodoboit.

In the 1980s, Burrill was managing editor of New Maritimes, a left-wing regional periodical.

== Political career ==
He was elected to the Nova Scotia House of Assembly in the 2009 provincial election. He represented the riding of Colchester-Musquodoboit Valley as a member of the New Democratic Party until his defeat in the 2013 election.

Burrill was the ministerial assistant for the Minister of Community Services (Housing), and chair of the Veteran's Affairs Committee of the Nova Scotia Legislature, in the government of Darrell Dexter.

On June 11, 2015, Burrill announced he was running for the leadership of the Nova Scotia New Democratic Party. On February 27, 2016, Burrill was elected as leader of the party, winning on the second counting of ballots in the instant-runoff voting system used for this election.

In July 2016, Burrill announced that he would seek the NDP nomination in Halifax Chebucto for the 2017 election. He defeated Joachim Stroink in the election to return to the legislature. Under Burrill's leadership in the 2017 election, the NDP took seven seats, the same number the party received on election night in 2013 but two more than it held going into the election.

In the August 2021 provincial election, Burrill was re-elected, along with five other NDP MLAs, all women. On November 9, 2021, Burrill announced he would step down as party leader, but would remain on until a new leader was chosen at a convention within the year. On May 21, 2022 registration closed for the leadership race, with Claudia Chender being the sole candidate to replace Burrill. She was confirmed as leader after a general membership vote on June 25, 2022 in Dartmouth and Burrill then formally stepped down as leader.

As of September 22, 2024, Burrill serves as the Third Party spokesperson for Seniors and Long-Term Care, Service Nova Scotia and Internal Services, and Fisheries and Aquaculture. He also serves as Caucus Whip for the Third Party.

In July 2024, Burrill announced that he would not be seeking reelection in the next Nova Scotia general election.

== Electoral record ==
2021 Nova Scotia general election: Halifax Chebucto
Party	Candidate	Votes	%	±%
New Democratic	Gary Burrill	4,009	51.99	+5.84
Liberal	Jackie Kinley	2,478	32.14	-7.15
Progressive Conservative	John Wesley Chisholm	911	11.81	+1.23
Green	Lily Barraclough	313	4.06	+0.10
Total valid votes		7,711	99.64	-0.03
Total rejected ballots		28	0.36	+0.03
Turnout		7,739	62.01	+8.94
Eligible voters		12,481		
New Democratic hold		Swing		+6.50
Source: Elections Nova Scotia

2017 Nova Scotia general election: Halifax Chebucto
Party	Candidate	Votes	%	±%
New Democratic	Gary Burrill	4,197	46.15	+7.47
Liberal	Joachim Stroink	3,573	39.29	-10.58
Progressive Conservative	John Wesley Chisholm	963	10.58	+0.56
Green	Casey Meijer	361	3.96	
Total valid votes		9,094	100	
Total rejected ballots		30		
Turnout		9,124	53.07	
Eligible voters		17,194		
New Democratic gain from Liberal		Swing		+9.03
Source: Elections Nova Scotia

2013 Nova Scotia general election: Colchester-Musquodoboit Valley
Party	Candidate	Votes	%	±%
Progressive Conservative	Larry Harrison	3,304	42.27	+13.28
New Democratic	Gary Burrill	2,293	29.33	-18.76
Liberal	Tom Martin	2,220	28.40	+7.79
Total		7,817	–	

2009 Nova Scotia general election: Colchester-Musquodoboit Valley
Party	Candidate	Votes	%	±%
New Democratic	Gary Burrill	3,697	47.45	+22.24
Progressive Conservative	Steve Streatch	2,265	29.07	-34.78
Liberal	Willie Versteeg	1,649	21.16	+12.41
Green	Margaret Whitney	181	2.32	+0.14
Total		7,792	–	
Source(s) Source: Nova Scotia Legislature (2021). "Electoral History for Colchester-Musquodoboit Valley" (PDF). nslegislature.ca.

2006 Nova Scotia general election: Colchester-Musquodoboit Valley
Party	Candidate	Votes	%	±%
Progressive Conservative	Brooke Taylor	4,790	63.85	-0.49
New Democratic	Gary Burrill	1,891	25.21	+1.99
Liberal	Carolyn Matthews	657	8.76	-3.69
Green	Leona MacLeod	164	2.19	–
Total		7,502	–	
Source(s) Source: Nova Scotia Legislature (2021). "Electoral History for Colchester-Musquodoboit Valley" (PDF). nslegislature.ca.
