= James H. Vaughan =

Canadian politician

MLA for Halifax Chebucto
- In office 1967–1970
- Preceded by: new riding
- Succeeded by: James L. Connolly

MLA for Halifax North
- In office 1963–1967
- Preceded by: John E. Ahern
- Succeeded by: riding dissolved

Personal details
- Born: May 9, 1934 Dartmouth, Nova Scotia
- Died: June 8, 1996 (aged 62) Halifax, Nova Scotia
- Party: Progressive Conservative

James Henry Vaughan (May 9, 1934 – June 8, 1996) was a Canadian politician. He represented the electoral districts of Halifax North and Halifax Chebucto in the Nova Scotia House of Assembly from 1963 to 1970. He was a member of the Progressive Conservative Party of Nova Scotia.

Vaughan was born in 1934 at Dartmouth, Nova Scotia. He was educated at Saint Mary's University, and was a surveyor by career. He married Shirley Juanita Fox in 1954. Vaughan died of cancer on June 8, 1996, in Halifax.
