= Harold Connolly =

Canadian politician (1901–1980)

The Honourable Harold Connolly
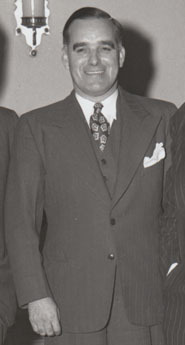

15th Premier of Nova Scotia
- In office 14 April 1954 – 29 September 1954
- Monarch: Elizabeth II
- Lieutenant Governor: Alistair Fraser
- Preceded by: Angus L. Macdonald
- Succeeded by: Henry Hicks

MLA for Halifax North
- In office 2 March 1936 – 28 July 1955
- Preceded by: Gordon Benjamin Isnor
- Succeeded by: John E. Ahern

Senator for Halifax North, Nova Scotia
- In office 28 July 1955 – 14 May 1979
- Appointed by: Louis St. Laurent

Personal details
- Born: Harold Joseph Connolly; 8 September 1901 Sydney, Nova Scotia, Canada
- Died: 17 May 1980 (aged 78)
- Party: Liberal
- Spouses: Catherine Burns (m. 1928); Vivian Martel
- Profession: Editor, journalist

Harold Joseph Connolly (8 September 1901 – 17 May 1980) was a Canadian journalist, newspaper editor, and politician who served as the 15th premier of Nova Scotia in 1954.

Connolly was born in Sydney, Nova Scotia, the son of Richard Joseph Connolly and Annie Duffield. He was educated at St. Mary's College. As a newspaperman, he worked for the Halifax Chronicle before serving as editor of the Daily Star.

He was first elected to the Nova Scotia House of Assembly in a 1936 by-election as a Liberal in Halifax North after Gordon Benjamin Isnor was elected to the House of Commons. He was appointed to cabinet in 1941 as Minister of Industry and Publicity. He served as Minister of Industry and Trade from 1945 to 1950, when he became Minister of Public Health. When Premier Angus L. Macdonald died in 1954, Connolly became the province's premier and the Liberal Party's interim leader. He stood for the full-time job in the 1954 leadership convention, but was defeated by Henry Hicks when Protestant delegates formed a united front to prevent the election of Connolly, a Catholic. The move caused a severe religious split within the party, which contributed to its defeat two years later at the hands of Robert Stanfield's Progressive Conservatives.

Connolly retired from provincial politics in 1955 when he was elevated to the Senate of Canada for the Halifax North, Nova Scotia division on 28 July 1955 following nomination by Prime Minister Louis St. Laurent. He served until his resignation on 14 May 1979.

Connolly was a lieutenant in the Royal Canadian Army Service Corps and the Canadian Officers' Training Corps from 1940 to 1945.

He married Catherine Burns in 1928; with whom he had 1 daughter, Catherine. He married Vivian Martel after the death of his first wife. He had five more children, Maureen, Dennis, David, Sharon and Patricia. Connolly's daughter Sharon Carstairs has gone on to have a prominent political career as leader of the Manitoba Liberal Party and, subsequently, a Liberal senator before retiring from politics in 2011.
