= James H. Aitchison =

Canadian politician

Leader of the Nova Scotia New Democratic Party
- In office 1963–1968
- Preceded by: Michael James MacDonald
- Succeeded by: Jeremy Akerman

Personal details
- Born: 1908 Innerleithen, Scotland
- Died: July 12, 1994 (aged 85–86) Halifax, Nova Scotia, Canada
- Party: Nova Scotia New Democratic Party
- Occupation: Professor

James Hermiston Aitchison (1908 – July 12, 1994) was a Canadian academic and politician and leader of the Nova Scotia New Democratic Party.

Born in Innerleithen, Scotland, he was the son of James Charles Aitchison and Elizabeth Fleming. He came to Canada at an early age and was raised in Saskatoon, Saskatchewan. He received his Bachelor of Arts and Bachelor of Education from the University of Saskatchewan. He would go on to earn a Bachelor of Science in economics from the University of London and a Ph.D. from the University of Toronto.

During World War Two, he served in the Canadian Army as a major from 1942 to 1946. After his service Aitchison taught high school and eventually lectured at Brandon College, Manitoba; University of Toronto; McMaster University; and Victoria College, Victoria, British Columbia. From 1949 to 1973 he taught political science at Dalhousie University in Halifax, Nova Scotia. He served for a period as chairman of the department, and remained professor emeritus within the department until his retirement in 1983.

During his time at Dalhousie University, he served as the first president of the Dalhousie Faculty Association, as well as president of the Canadian Association of University Teachers, chairman of the Social Sciences Research Council of Canada; vice-president of the Canadian Political Science Association as well as vice president of the Institute for Public Administration of Canada. He also served as a council member for many years on the Atlantic Council of Canada.

== Political career ==
In 1961 the Co-operative Commonwealth Federation (CCF) joined with the Canadian Labour Congress to form the New Democratic Party. Aitchison became the provincial party's leader in 1963. He led the party through the 1963 and 1967 provincial elections. His critics accused him of being part of the Halifax elite that was believed to have taken the party from its traditional roots and leadership in industrial Cape Breton. He declined to re-offer in 1968 and was replaced by Cape Bretoner, Jeremy Akerman. However, Aitchison continued to be active within the party until the early 1970s, when he ceased involvement.

He ran as a candidate for the Nova Scotia Legislature in the 1967 provincial general elections. Both he and the party failed to win any seats during this election, leaving the NDP without representation in the Legislature. Aitchison also ran for the House of Commons of Canada in the federal elections of 1962 and 1967, but again failed to win a seat. Under his leadership, the Nova Scotia NDP achieved its worst electoral results. In the two provincial elections he led the party, it recorded its lowest percentage of the popular vote in the modern era. The 1963 campaign reached a twenty-five-year low (if including its predecessor, the CCF), when the party received just about four percent of the popular vote.

Aitchison married Oriole Faram and had one daughter. In 1994, he died at the age of 86, in Halifax, Nova Scotia.

== Academic bibliography ==
- 1940 - Canada at War (Toronto: Canadian Institute of International Affairs).
- 1953 - The Development of Local Government in Upper Canada (Thesis (Ph.D.) University of Toronto).
- 1963 - The Political Process in Canada: Essays in Honour of R. MacGregor Dawson (Toronto: University of Toronto Press).
