= Halifax Chebucto =

Provincial electoral district in Nova Scotia, Canada

Coordinates: 44.642°N 63.609°W

Nova Scotia electoral district

Provincial electoral district
- Legislature: Nova Scotia House of Assembly
MLA
Krista Gallagher
New Democratic
- District created: 1967
- First contested: 1967
- Last contested: 2024

Demographics
- Population (2016): 18,939
- Electors (2017): 17,588
- Area (km²): 4.00
- Pop. density (per km²): 4,734.8
- Census division: Halifax Regional Municipality

Halifax Chebucto is a provincial electoral district in Nova Scotia, Canada, that elects one member of the Nova Scotia House of Assembly.

It is one of several ridings within the Halifax Regional Municipality. It encompasses the neighbourhood known informally as the West End. The economy consists mostly of military employment from CFB Halifax, the Queen Elizabeth II Health Science's Centre as well as retail stores on Quinpool Road.

The riding is one of the few in the province to have a long history of New Democratic Party (NDP) representation. It been represented by an NDP Member of the Legislative Assembly (MLA) for all but two terms since 1981. In the 2013 election, the Liberal candidate, Joachim Stroink was elected to represent the riding in the House of Assembly during the collapse of the NDP province-wide. However, the 2017 election saw the new leader of the NDP Gary Burrill elected, defeating Stroink after only one term.

The riding has produced two provincial NDP leaders, Alexa McDonough (who would go on to lead the federal NDP) and Burrill.

== Geography ==
The land area of Halifax Chebucto is 4.00 km^{2} (1.54 sq mi). With a population of 18,939 people as of 2016, the population density was approximately 4,734.8/km^{2} (12,262.9/sq mi).

== Members of the Legislative Assembly ==
This riding has elected the following MLAs:

Halifax Chebucto
Legislature	Years	Member	Party
49th	1967–1970	James H. Vaughan	Progressive Conservative
50th	1970–1974	James L. Connolly	Liberal
51st	1974–1978	Walter Fitzgerald	Liberal
52nd	1978–1981	Walter Fitzgerald	Liberal
53rd	1981–1984	Alexa McDonough	New Democratic
54th	1984–1988	Alexa McDonough	New Democratic
55th	1988–1993	Alexa McDonough	New Democratic
56th	1993–1998	Jay Abbass	Liberal
57th	1998–1999	Howard Epstein	New Democratic
58th	1999–2003	Howard Epstein	New Democratic
59th	2003–2005	Howard Epstein	New Democratic
60th	2006–2009	Howard Epstein	New Democratic
61st	2009–2013	Howard Epstein	New Democratic
62nd	2013–2017	Joachim Stroink	Liberal
63rd	2017–2021	Gary Burrill	New Democratic
64th	2021–2024	Gary Burrill	New Democratic
65th	2024–present	Krista Gallagher	New Democratic

== Election results ==
=== 2024 ===
2024 Nova Scotia general election
Party	Candidate	Votes	%	±%
New Democratic	Krista Gallagher	3,682	53.99	+2.00
Progressive Conservative	Tonya Malay	1,577	23.12	+11.31
Liberal	Gerard Bray	1,441	21.13	-11.01
Green	Jonathan Bradet-Legris	120	1.76	-2.30
Total		6,820	–	
Total rejected ballots		16		
Turnout		6,841	53.60	
Eligible voters		12,763		
New Democratic hold		Swing		
Source: Elections Nova Scotia

=== 2021 ===
2021 Nova Scotia general election
Party	Candidate	Votes	%	±%	Expenditures
New Democratic	Gary Burrill	4,009	51.99	+5.84	$71,457.98
Liberal	Jackie Kinley	2,478	32.14	-7.15	$44,006.82
Progressive Conservative	John Wesley Chisholm	911	11.81	+1.23	$24,464.68
Green	Lily Barraclough	313	4.06	+0.10	$3,469.26
Total valid votes/expense limit		7,711	99.64	–	$75,446.74
Total rejected ballots		28	0.36		
Turnout		7,739	62.01		
Eligible voters		12,481			
New Democratic hold		Swing		+6.50	
Source: Elections Nova Scotia

=== 2017 ===
2017 Nova Scotia general election
Party	Candidate	Votes	%	±%
New Democratic	Gary Burrill	4,197	46.15	+7.47
Liberal	Joachim Stroink	3,573	39.29	-10.58
Progressive Conservative	John Wesley Chisholm	963	10.58	+0.56
Green	Casey Meijer	361	3.96	
Total valid votes		9,094	100	
Total rejected ballots		30		
Turnout		9,124	53.07	
Eligible voters		17,194		
New Democratic gain from Liberal		Swing		+9.03
Source: Elections Nova Scotia

=== 2013 ===
2013 Nova Scotia general election
Party	Candidate	Votes	%	±%
Liberal	Joachim Stroink	4,352	49.87	17.67
New Democratic	Gregory Ash	3,376	38.68	-17.79
Progressive Conservative	Christine Dewell	874	10.01	3.11
Independent	Michael Marshall	125	1.43	–
Total		8,727	–	
Source(s) Source: Nova Scotia Legislature (2024). "Electoral History for Halifax Chebucto" (PDF). nslegislature.ca. Nova Scotia, Chief Electoral Officer (2013). 39th Provincial General Election, October 8, 2013: Volume 1 – Statement of Votes & Statistics (PDF) (Report). Elections Nova Scotia. Archived from the original (PDF) on 10 April 2018.

=== 2009 ===
2009 Nova Scotia general election
Party	Candidate	Votes	%	±%
New Democratic	Howard Epstein	4,446	56.47	2.32
Liberal	Jane Spurr	2,535	32.20	13.18
Progressive Conservative	David Atchison	544	6.91	-15.18
Green	Chris Hanlon	348	4.42	-0.32
Total		7,873	–	
Source(s) Source: Nova Scotia Legislature (2024). "Electoral History for Halifax Chebucto" (PDF). nslegislature.ca.

=== 2006 ===
2006 Nova Scotia general election
Party	Candidate	Votes	%	±%
New Democratic	Howard Epstein	4,216	54.15	10.11
Progressive Conservative	Sean Phillips	1,720	22.09	-1.63
Liberal	Peter Verner	1,481	19.02	-11.98
Green	Christopher Harborne	369	4.74	–
Total		7,786	–	
Source(s) Source: Nova Scotia Legislature (2024). "Electoral History for Halifax Chebucto" (PDF). nslegislature.ca.

=== 2003 ===
2003 Nova Scotia general election
Party	Candidate	Votes	%	±%
New Democratic	Howard Epstein	3,682	44.04	6.36
Liberal	Kenzie MacKinnon	2,592	31.00	3.73
Progressive Conservative	Sandy Phillips	1,983	23.72	-9.82
Nova Scotia Party	Scott Higgins	103	1.23	-0.27
Total		8,360	–	
Source(s) Source: Nova Scotia Legislature (2024). "Electoral History for Halifax Chebucto" (PDF). nslegislature.ca.

=== 1999 ===
1999 Nova Scotia general election
Party	Candidate	Votes	%	±%
New Democratic	Howard Epstein	3,159	37.69	-8.96
Progressive Conservative	Sean Phillips	2,811	33.54	15.70
Liberal	Royden Trainor	2,286	27.27	-8.24
Nova Scotia Party	Hilda M. Stevens	126	1.50	–
Total		8,382	–	
Source(s) Source: Nova Scotia Legislature (2024). "Electoral History for Halifax Chebucto" (PDF). nslegislature.ca. Nova Scotia, Chief Electoral Officer (1999). Returns of the General Election for the House of Assembly, Thirty-Fifth General Election (Report). Elections Nova Scotia.

=== 1998 ===
1998 Nova Scotia general election
Party	Candidate	Votes	%	±%
New Democratic	Howard Epstein	4,158	46.65	11.22
Liberal	Kenzie MacKinnon	3,165	35.51	-0.91
Progressive Conservative	Sean Phillips	1,590	17.84	-9.23
Total		8,913	–	
Source(s) Source: Nova Scotia Legislature (2024). "Electoral History for Halifax Chebucto" (PDF). nslegislature.ca.

=== 1993 ===
1993 Nova Scotia general election
Party	Candidate	Votes	%	±%
Liberal	Jay Abbass	3,906	36.42	8.12
New Democratic	Eileen O'Connell	3,800	35.43	-0.55
Progressive Conservative	J. Clair Callaghan	2,903	27.07	-8.65
Natural Law	Christopher Collrin	116	1.08	–
Total		10,725	–	
Source(s) Source: Nova Scotia Legislature (2024). "Electoral History for Halifax Chebucto" (PDF). nslegislature.ca. Nova Scotia, Chief Electoral Officer (1993). Returns of the General Election for the House of Assembly, Thirty-Third General Election (PDF) (Report). Queen's Printer. Archived from the original (PDF) on 18 June 2018.

=== 1988 ===
1988 Nova Scotia general election
Party	Candidate	Votes	%	±%
New Democratic	Alexa McDonough	3,238	35.99	-13.66
Progressive Conservative	J. Clair Callaghan	3,214	35.72	5.87
Liberal	Penny Doherty	2,546	28.30	7.80
Total		8,998	–	
Source(s) Source: Nova Scotia Legislature (2024). "Electoral History for Halifax Chebucto" (PDF). nslegislature.ca. Nova Scotia, Chief Electoral Officer (1988). Returns of the General Election for the House of Assembly, Thirty-Second General Election (PDF) (Report). Queen's Printer. Archived from the original (PDF) on 7 July 2018.

=== 1984 ===
1984 Nova Scotia general election
Party	Candidate	Votes	%	±%
New Democratic	Alexa McDonough	4,374	49.65	9.53
Progressive Conservative	Helen Gillis	2,630	29.85	-5.18
Liberal	Dan Clarke	1,806	20.50	-4.35
Total		8,810	–	
Source(s) Source: Nova Scotia Legislature (2024). "Electoral History for Halifax Chebucto" (PDF). nslegislature.ca. Nova Scotia, Chief Electoral Officer (1984). Returns of the General Election for the House of Assembly, Thirty-First General Election (PDF) (Report). Queen's Printer. Archived from the original (PDF) on 31 July 2017.

=== 1981 ===
1981 Nova Scotia general election
Party	Candidate	Votes	%	±%
New Democratic	Alexa McDonough	3,886	40.12	25.74
Progressive Conservative	D. C. McNeil	3,394	35.04	-6.31
Liberal	Walter Fitzgerald	2,407	24.85	-19.43
Total		9,687	–	
Source(s) Source: Nova Scotia Legislature (2024). "Electoral History for Halifax Chebucto" (PDF). nslegislature.ca. Nova Scotia, Chief Electoral Officer (1981). Returns of the General Election for the House of Assembly, Thirtieth General Election (PDF) (Report). Queen's Printer. Archived from the original (PDF) on 31 July 2017.

=== 1978 ===
1978 Nova Scotia general election
Party	Candidate	Votes	%	±%
Liberal	Walter Fitzgerald	3,998	44.28	-9.19
Progressive Conservative	Margaret Stanburg	3,733	41.34	10.52
New Democratic	Donald F. Mielke	1,298	14.38	-1.34
Total		9,029	–	
Source(s) Source: Nova Scotia Legislature (2024). "Electoral History for Halifax Chebucto" (PDF). nslegislature.ca. Nova Scotia, Chief Electoral Officer (1978). Returns of the General Election for the House of Assembly, Twenty-Ninth General Election (PDF) (Report). Queen's Printer. Archived from the original (PDF) on 18 June 2018.

=== 1974 ===
1974 Nova Scotia general election
Party	Candidate	Votes	%	±%
Liberal	Walter Fitzgerald	5,608	53.47	3.08
Progressive Conservative	Dennis Ashworth	3,233	30.82	-7.52
New Democratic	Burris Devanney	1,648	15.71	4.44
Total		10,489	–	
Source(s) Source: Nova Scotia Legislature (2024). "Electoral History for Halifax Chebucto" (PDF). nslegislature.ca. Nova Scotia, Chief Electoral Officer (1974). Returns of the General Election for the House of Assembly, Twenty-Eighth General Election (PDF) (Report). Queen's Printer. Archived from the original (PDF) on 18 June 2018.

=== 1970 ===
1970 Nova Scotia general election
Party	Candidate	Votes	%	±%
Liberal	James L. Connolly	5,276	50.39	7.47
Progressive Conservative	James H. Vaughan	4,015	38.34	-13.66
New Democratic	Burris Devanney	1,180	11.27	6.19
Total		10,471	–	
Source(s) Source: Nova Scotia Legislature (2024). "Electoral History for Halifax Chebucto" (PDF). nslegislature.ca. Nova Scotia, Legislative Assembly (1970). Returns of the General Election for the House of Assembly, 1970 (PDF) (Report). Queen's Printer. Archived from the original (PDF) on 25 July 2018.

=== 1967 ===
1967 Nova Scotia general election
Party	Candidate	Votes	%	±%
Progressive Conservative	James H. Vaughan	5,154	52.01	–
Liberal	K. Peter Richard	4,253	42.92	–
New Democratic	Keith Jobson	503	5.08	–
Total		9,910	–	
Source(s) Source: Nova Scotia Legislature (2024). "Electoral History for Halifax Chebucto" (PDF). nslegislature.ca. Nova Scotia Legislature (1967). Returns of the General Election for the House of Assembly (PDF) (Report). Queen's Printer. Archived from the original (PDF) on 25 July 2018.

== See also ==
- List of Nova Scotia provincial electoral districts
- Canadian provincial electoral districts
