= Nova Scotia New Democratic Party =

Provincial political party in Canada

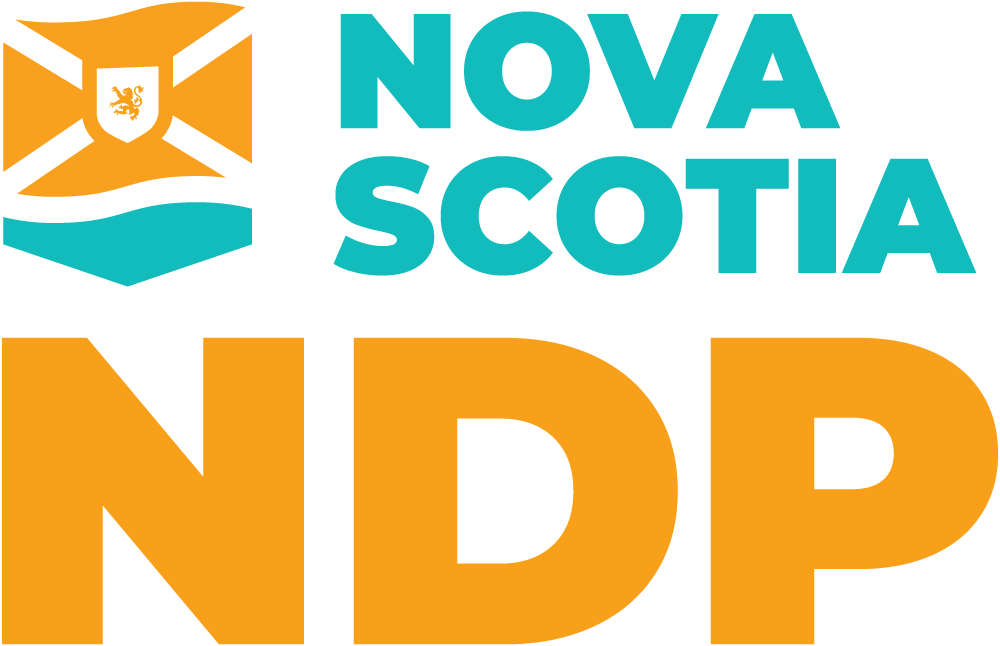
- Abbreviation: Nova Scotia NDP; NSNDP
- Leader: Claudia Chender
- President: Mary Rita Holland
- Founded: 1932 (NS CCF); 1961 (NS NDP)
- Headquarters: 5151 George Street; Suite 603; Halifax, Nova Scotia; B3J 1M5
- Youth wing: Nova Scotia Young New Democrats (NSYND)
- Membership (2017): 3,595
- Ideology: Social democracy
- Political position: Centre-left
- National affiliation: New Democratic Party
- Colours: Orange
- Seats in House of Assembly: 9 / 56

Website
- nsndp.ca

The Nova Scotia New Democratic Party (Nova Scotia NDP) is a social democratic political party in Nova Scotia, Canada. It is the provincial section of the federal New Democratic Party.

It was founded as the Co-operative Commonwealth Federation (CCF) in 1932, and became the New Democratic Party in 1961. It became the governing party of Nova Scotia following the 2009 Nova Scotia election, winning 31 seats in the Legislature, under the leadership of Premier Darrell Dexter. It is the only New Democratic Party in Atlantic Canada to form a government, and the second to form a government in a province east of Manitoba. The party lost government at the 2013 election, losing 24 seats, including Dexter's seat. Gary Burrill, the party's leader from 2016 to 2022, is credited with bringing the party back to its left-wing roots. The party currently holds nine seats in the Legislature and has been led by Claudia Chender since June 2022.

== Co-operative Commonwealth Federation (1933–1961) ==
Since shortly after Canadian Confederation, Nova Scotia has had a two-party system in which power alternated between the Nova Scotia Liberal Party and Progressive Conservatives. In the 1920 provincial election the left had a breakthrough when the United Farmers won six seats and the Independent Labour Party won five. The two forces joined to form an 11-member official opposition under Daniel G. Mackenzie, but the group was undermined by the Liberals (who tarnished the image of the opposition MLAs by offering them payments) and the United Farmers/Labour grouping was wiped out in 1925.

Though the CCF/NDP has a long history in Nova Scotia, it was unable to break the two-party system and win more than a handful of seats (if any) in the Nova Scotia House of Assembly until the 1990s.

The Co-operative Commonwealth Federation was formed in 1932 and ran its first candidates in the 1933 general election but failed to win any electoral representation. The party did not contest the 1937 general election.

In the 1939 Cape Breton Centre by-election, Douglas MacDonald won the CCF's first seat in the legislature.

In 1941, the future Canadian Labour Congress (CLC) president Donald MacDonald was elected from the Cape Breton South constituency. He was joined by Douglas Neil Brodie, who was elected in Cape Breton East constituency, bringing the CCF up to a total of three MLAs. Donald MacDonald was the party's leader in the Assembly until 1945. He lost a close campaign in the 1945 election, but the party still retained two seats on Cape Breton Island. MacDonald then transitioned into working full-time with the Canadian Congress of Labour, a predecessor of the CLC. A lot of the early organization of the CCF in Nova Scotia was done by Maritime Organizer Fred Young. Young would go on to continue his work in Ontario and eventually sit as a member of the Ontario Legislature, however, his early work laid the groundwork for any future advancements the party would make during this period. This was evident in 1945 when two CCF members elected from Cape Breton.

Russell Cunningham was the only CCF leader to serve as Leader of the Opposition after the 1945 provincial election in which Premier Angus L. Macdonald's Liberal Party swept 28 of the 30 seats and the Tories were wiped out. CCFers Cunningham and fellow Cape Bretoner Michael James MacDonald were the only opposition MLAs elected. Cunningham and MacDonald were re-elected in 1949 but were reduced to third party status behind Robert Stanfield's Progressive Conservatives.

MacDonald led the CCF from 1953 to 1963. He was the party's sole MLA in that period, even though he won 8.9% of the popular vote for the CCF in the 1960 election.

== Nova Scotia NDP (1961–present) ==
Following the creation of the federal and provincial New Democratic Party (NDP), MacDonald stepped down as leader and the locus of authority in the party moved to Halifax under the leadership of Professor James H. Aitchison. MacDonald lost his seat in the 1963 provincial election. The NDP would not win another until Jeremy Akerman became party leader and won the riding of Cape Breton East in the 1970 election. NDP representation in the House of Assembly grew slowly in throughout the 1970s, but never rose above four seats. The CCF had only been able to win seats on Cape Breton Island and the NDP did not win seats outside of Cape Breton until 1981. With the election of the 26-year-old Akerman as party leader in 1968, and his subsequent election to the legislature two years later, the party regained and developed its strong base in industrial Cape Breton, and won four seats in the election of 1978. However, the party failed to win any seats on the mainland, and this exacerbated tensions between the Akerman-dominated Cape Breton wing of the party and the university-based party establishment in Halifax. Following increasingly bloody internal battles Akerman resigned and the NDP lost all four Cape Breton seats in the following election.

=== Alexa McDonough ===
In 1980, Haligonian Alexa McDonough became leader of the Nova Scotia NDP, the first female leader of a major recognized party in Canada. She was the only NDP candidate elected in 1981. During her 14-year leadership, the NDP never had more than three Members of the Legislative Assembly (MLAs). Nonetheless, she raised the party's profile and become a well known advocate for the poor and disadvantaged. In a reversal of earlier times, while the NDP under McDonough won seats on the mainland for the first time, it lost all of its Cape Breton seats in the 1981 election and never regained them during McDonough's leadership. She resigned as Nova Scotia NDP leader in 1994 and went on to be elected leader of the federal NDP in 1995.

=== Robert Chisholm ===
Under Robert Chisholm's leadership, in 1998 the party vaulted from third place to ahead of the Progressive Conservatives (PCs), and won 19 seats in the Nova Scotia House of Assembly, the same number of seats as won by the Liberals. The Liberals formed a minority government with the support of 14 Progressive Conservatives (Tories), the latter who had also improved their standings. An NDP government seemed imminent.

However, the party was unable to improve on its standings in the 1999 election. But with 11 seats in the legislature with 29.9% of the vote, it edged out the Liberals and were able to retain "Official Opposition" status when the PCs formed a majority government under John Hamm. Chisholm's unexpected resignation immediately following the election led to a period of internal party strife, with new leader Helen MacDonald, a former Cape Breton MLA, resigning after barely a year.

=== First government under Darrell Dexter ===
Previous logo of the Nova Scotia New Democratic Party

The 2003 election resulted in a PC minority government while the NDP maintained Official Opposition status under new leader Darrell Dexter. In the election, the NDP won 15 seats and 31% of the vote, coming slightly behind the Liberals in the popular vote but winning three more seats than the Liberals' 12. In the 2006 election, the NDP managed to capitalize on its position as the Official Opposition to squeeze the Liberal vote, and the party increased its number of seats from 15 to 20, an all-time high, and won 34.63% of the vote. Unlike in 2003, in 2006 the NDP came in a clear second in the popular vote, far ahead of the Liberals.

On June 9, 2009, Dexter led the NDP to victory, winning a majority government, and was sworn in as Premier of Nova Scotia on June 19, 2009. His party's victory marked the first time that the NDP had won government in a province east of Ontario, and only the second time the party had won government east of Manitoba. When the party won in 2009, a major reason for their winning is the way the party used political marketing. The political marketing strategy was used in Manitoba years before the Nova Scotia NDP used the strategy. The Dexter government lasted a single term and was defeated in the October 8, 2013 provincial election,. Although it finished second in terms of popular vote with 26.84%, the party collapsed to only seven seats, making it the third party in the legislature. This was mainly because the NDP's support in Halifax, its power base for two decades, practically melted. The NDP had gone into the election holding 14 of the capital's 20 seats, but lost all but two. Among them was Dexter, who narrowly lost his own seat. On November 16, 2013, Dexter announced his resignation as NDP leader, effective November 23, 2013.

Maureen MacDonald served as interim leader from Dexter's resignation in 2013, until Gary Burrill's election as leader, in 2016.

Two members of the party's caucus, Gordie Gosse and Frank Corbett resigned for personal reasons in April 2015, triggering two of three provincial by-elections which were held on July 14. The party lost both of those seats, but Marian Mancini won the third by-election in a seat that had been held by the Liberals.

=== Gary Burrill ===
Under Gary Burrill's leadership in the 2017 election, the NDP took seven seats, the same number the party received on election night in 2013 but two more than it held going into the election. Since that election, three NDP MLAs resigned: Dave Wilson, Lenore Zann, and Tammy Martin.

In the 2021 provincial election, the NDP won six seats and Burrill was personally re-elected. On November 9, 2021, Burrill announced that he will resign as leader once a new leader is chosen. He was succeeded by Claudia Chender on June 25, 2022 at a leadership convention held in Dartmouth to confirm her as leader. Chender was the sole candidate to register to replace Burrill.

=== Claudia Chender ===
On February 14, 2022, Claudia Chender declared her candidacy to replace Gary Burrill as leader. On May 21, 2022, registration closed for the leadership race, with Chender being the sole candidate. She was confirmed as leader after a general membership vote on June 25, 2022. She is the third female leader of the NSNDP, with the previous female leaders being Alexa McDonough and Helen MacDonald; fourth leader, if interim leader Maureen MacDonald is included. The 2024 election resulted in a PC majority government while the NDP gained Official Opposition status.

== Party leaders ==
"†" denotes acting or interim leader.

=== CCF ===
#	Party Leader	Tenure	Notes
1	Donald MacDonald	1941–1945	
2	Russell Cunningham	1945–1953	Leader of the Opposition, 1945-1949
3	Michael James MacDonald	1953–1963	

=== NDP ===
#	Party Leader	Tenure	Notes
1	James H. Aitchison	1963–1968	
2	Jeremy Akerman	1968–1980	
†	James 'Buddy' McEachern	1980	interim leader
3	Alexa McDonough	1980–1994	
†	John Holm	1994–1996	interim leader
4	Robert Chisholm	1996–2000	Leader of the Opposition, 1998-1999
5	Helen MacDonald	2000–2001	
6	Darrell Dexter	2001–2013	Leader of the Opposition, 2001–2009; First NDP Premier, 2009–2013
†	Maureen MacDonald	2013–2016	interim leader
7	Gary Burrill	2016–2022	
8	Claudia Chender	2022–present	Leader of the Opposition since 2024

== Provincial secretaries ==
- Lloyd R. Shaw (-1949)
- Dr. L. P. Rutherford (1949–1950)
- Florence E. Welton (1950–1961)
- John McKinnon (1961–1963)
- Nancy Doull (1963–1965)
- Rae Gilman (1965–1969)
- Peggy Prowse (1969–1971)
- Gordon Flowers (1971–1974)
- Karen Vance (1974–1977)
- Bev Ivan (1978)
- Serena Renner (1979–1981)
- Mary Morrison (1982)
- Brian MacNaulty (1983)
- Rod Dickinson (1984–1986)
- Gayle Cromwell (1986–1987)
- Dennis Theman (1987–1990)
- Sandra Houston (1990–1992)
- Ross Fisher (1992–1996)
- Ron Cavalucci (1996–1997)
- Bruce Cox (1997–1999)
- Joe Fraser (1999–2001)
- Matthew Hebb (2001 – June 2005)
- Karen Haslam (October 2005 – March 2006)
- Ed Wark (2006–2010)
- Joanne Lamey (acting, 2010)
- Mike MacSween (2010–2012)
- Jill Marzetti (2012–2013)
- Mike Poworoznyk (2013–2017)
- Jamie Masse (2018–present)

== Election results ==
Election	Leader	Seats	+/−	Votes	%	Place	Position
1933	None	0 / 30	Steady	2,336	0.7	Steady	No Seats
1937	None	0 / 30	Steady	0	0	Steady	No Seats
1941	Donald MacDonald	3 / 30	▲3	18,583	7.0	▲3rd	Third Party
1945	Donald MacDonald	2 / 30	▼1	39,637	13.6	▲2nd	Opposition
1949	Russell Cunningham	2 / 37	Steady	32,869	9.6	▼3rd	Third Party
1953	Russell Cunningham	2 / 37	Steady	23,700	6.8	3rd	Third Party
1956	Michael James MacDonald	1 / 43	▼1	9,932	3.0	3rd	Third Party
1960	Michael James MacDonald	1 / 43	Steady	31,036	8.9	3rd	Third Party
1963	James H. Aitchison	0 / 43	▼1	14,076	4.1	3rd	No Seats
1967	James H. Aitchison	0 / 46	Steady	17,873	5.2	3rd	No Seats
1970	Jeremy Akerman	2 / 46	▲2	25,259	6.6	3rd	Third Party
1974	Jeremy Akerman	3 / 46	▲1	55,902	13.0	3rd	Third Party
1978	Jeremy Akerman	4 / 52	▲1	63,979	14.4	3rd	Third Party
1981	Alexa McDonough	1 / 52	▼3	76,289	18.1	3rd	Third Party
1984	Alexa McDonough	3 / 52	▲2	65,876	15.9	3rd	Third Party
1988	Alexa McDonough	2 / 52	▼1	74,038	15.7	3rd	Third Party
1993	Alexa McDonough	3 / 52	▲1	86,743	17.7	3rd	Third Party
1998	Robert Chisholm	19 / 52	▲16	155,361	34.4	▲2nd	Opposition
1999	Robert Chisholm	11 / 52	▼8	129,474	29.7	2nd	Opposition
2003	Darrell Dexter	15 / 52	▲4	126,479	30.9	2nd	Opposition
2006	Darrell Dexter	20 / 52	▲5	140,128	34.6	2nd	Opposition
2009	Darrell Dexter	31 / 52	▲11	186,556	45.2	▲1st	Majority
2013	Darrell Dexter	7 / 51	▼24	112,389	26.9	▼3rd	Third Party
2017	Gary Burrill	7 / 51	Steady	85,389	21.4	3rd	Third Party
2021	Gary Burrill	6 / 55	▼1	88,477	20.93	3rd	Third Party
2024	Claudia Chender	9 / 55	▲3	79,079	22.29	▲2nd	Opposition

- Election results between 1933 and 1963 represent the party during its time as the Co-operative Commonwealth Federation. Since 1963, the party has been called the New Democratic Party.

Sources:

- To 1984: Politics of Nova Scotia: Vol. Two 1896-1988 by J. Murray Beck. Four Post Publications: Tantallon, Nova Scotia, 1988.
- After 1984: Elections Nova Scotia

== Current Nova Scotia New Democrat MLAs ==
Name	Riding	Year elected
Claudia Chender	Dartmouth South	2017
Kendra Coombes	Cape Breton Centre	2020
Krista Gallagher	Halifax Chebucto	2024
Lina Hamid	Fairview-Clayton Park	2024
Suzy Hansen	Halifax Needham	2021
Lisa Lachance	Halifax Citadel-Sable Island	2021
Susan Leblanc	Dartmouth North	2017
Rod Wilson	Halifax Armdale	2024
Paul Wozney	Sackville-Cobequid	2024

== Youth wing ==
The youth wing of the Nova Scotia New Democratic Party is the Nova Scotia Young New Democrats (NSYND). Founded in the early 1960s, it was not incorporated with a full constitution - aligned with that of the party proper - until 1969.

The youth wing was partially responsible for the election of Jeremy Akerman, as leader, at the 1968 Leadership Convention.

In 1994, the NSYND was renamed "The Nova Scotia NDP Youth Wing". At this time the youth wing was quite moderate, encouraging the main party to focus on government and embrace mainstream values such as fiscal responsibility, "one member one vote" and banning corporate and union donations. They also successfully lobbied the party to include more youth members in the party structure. Members and alumni of the youth wing were instrumental in forming NDProgress in 2000.

In a controversial move, the youth wing was renamed the “New Party Youth Movement” (NPYM) in 2001. The name change was made to advocate a renewal of the NDP similar the one in 1961 when the Co-operative Commonwealth Federation (CCF) became the NDP. The “New Party” name was taken from the “New Party” groups formed before the creation of the NDP. The NPYM made a positive impact at the 2001 NSNDP convention pushing the party to adopt a “one member one vote” style of electing its leader, successfully distributed home-made buttons to satire an organized attempt to shame members of the NDP caucus who did not support former leader Helen MacDonald and gaining over 2/3 support from convention delegates for their name change.

The youth wing was reconstituted in 2004 under its current name, the Nova Scotia Young New Democrats (NSYND); the wing has remained ideologically in step with that of the party proper.

== See also ==
- List of articles about Nova Scotia CCF/NDP members
- List of Nova Scotia political parties
- Nova Scotia New Democratic Party leadership elections
