= Lunenburg (provincial electoral district) =

Provincial electoral district in Nova Scotia, Canada

Nova Scotia electoral district

Provincial electoral district
- Legislature: Nova Scotia House of Assembly
MLA
Susan Corkum-Greek
Progressive Conservative
- District created: 1867
- First contested: 1867
- Last contested: 2024

Demographics
- Population (2011): 17,053
- Electors (2012): 14,140
- Area (km²): 894
- Pop. density (per km²): 19.1
- Census division: Lunenburg

Lunenburg is a provincial electoral district in Nova Scotia, Canada, that elects one member of the Nova Scotia House of Assembly. From 1867 to 1956, the district included all of Lunenburg County. In 1956, the district was abolished into Lunenburg Centre, Lunenburg East and Lunenburg West. The riding was re-created in 1993 with nearly identical boundaries to Lunenburg Centre, except it lost the area west of the LaHave River (except New Germany) to Lunenburg West. The district also lost the Tancook Islands to Chester-St. Margaret's.

The riding includes the towns of Lunenburg and Mahone Bay.

== Geography ==
Lunenburg electoral district covers 894 km^{2} (345 sq mi) of land area.

== Members of the Legislative Assembly ==
This riding has elected the following members of the Legislative Assembly:

| Legislature | Years | Member | Party |
|---|---|---|---|---|---|
| 65th | 2024–present | Susan Corkum-Greek | Progressive Conservative |
| 64th | 2021–2024 | Susan Corkum-Greek | Progressive Conservative |
| 63rd | 2017–2021 | Suzanne Lohnes-Croft | Liberal |
| 62nd | 2013–2017 | Suzanne Lohnes-Croft | Liberal |
| 61st | 2009–2013 | Pam Birdsall | New Democratic |
| 60th | 2006–2009 | Michael Baker | Progressive Conservative |
| 59th | 2003–2006 | Michael Baker | Progressive Conservative |
| 58th | 1999–2003 | Michael Baker | Progressive Conservative |
| 57th | 1998–1999 | Michael Baker | Progressive Conservative |
| 56th | 1993–1998 | Lila O'Connor | Liberal |
Lunenburg Centre
| 55th | 1988–1993 | Al Mosher | Progressive Conservative |
| 54th | 1984–1988 | Maxine Cochran | Progressive Conservative |
| 53rd | 1984 | Maxine Cochran | Progressive Conservative |
| 53rd | 1981–1984 | Bruce Cochran | Progressive Conservative |
| 52nd | 1978–1981 | Bruce Cochran | Progressive Conservative |
| 51st | 1974–1978 | Bruce Cochran | Progressive Conservative |
| 50th | 1970–1974 | Walton Cook | Liberal |
| 49th | 1967–1970 | George O. Lohnes | Progressive Conservative |
| 48th | 1963–1967 | George O. Lohnes | Progressive Conservative |
| 47th | 1960–1963 | George O. Lohnes | Progressive Conservative |
| 46th | 1956–1960 | George O. Lohnes | Progressive Conservative |
Lunenburg
| 45th | 1953–1956 | R. Clifford Levy | Liberal | Harley J. Spence | Liberal |
| 44th | 1949–1953 | Arthur L. Thurlow | Liberal | Gordon E. Romkey | Liberal |
| 43rd | 1945–1949 | Frank R. Davis | Liberal | Gordon E. Romkey | Liberal |
| 42nd | 1941–1945 | Frank R. Davis | Liberal | Gordon E. Romkey | Liberal |
| 41st | 1937–1941 | Frank R. Davis | Liberal | Gordon E. Romkey | Liberal |
| 40th | 1933–1937 | Frank R. Davis | Liberal | Gordon E. Romkey | Liberal |
| 39th | 1928–1933 | John James Kinley | Liberal | Gordon E. Romkey | Liberal |
| 38th | 1925–1928 | Wallace Norman Rehfuss | Liberal-Conservative | William Haslam Smith | Liberal-Conservative |
| 37th | 1920–1925 | Aubrey Sperry | Liberal | John James Kinley | Liberal |
| 36th | 1917–1920 | Vacant | | John James Kinley | Liberal |
| 36th | 1916–1917 | Joseph Willis Margeson | Liberal | John James Kinley | Liberal |
| 35th | 1911–1916 | Joseph Willis Margeson | Liberal | Alfred Clairmonte Zwicker | Liberal |
| 35th | 1911 | Joseph Willis Margeson | Liberal | Alexander Kenneth Maclean | Liberal |
| 34th | 1911 | Alfred Clairmonte Zwicker | Liberal | Charles Uniacke Mader | Liberal |
| 34th | 1909–1911 | Alexander Kenneth Maclean | Liberal | Charles Uniacke Mader | Liberal |
| 34th | 1906–1909 | Henry March | Liberal | Charles Uniacke Mader | Liberal |
| 33rd | 1904–1906 | John Drew Sperry | Liberal | Charles Uniacke Mader | Liberal |
| 33rd | 1902–1904 | John Drew Sperry | Liberal | Alexander Kenneth Maclean | Liberal |
| 33rd | 1901–1902 | Edward Doran Davison, Jr. | Liberal | Alexander Kenneth Maclean | Liberal |
| 32nd | 1897–1901 | John Drew Sperry | Liberal | Charles Edward Church | Liberal |
| 31st | 1896–1897 | Allan Moreash | Liberal | Charles Edward Church | Liberal |
| 31st | 1894–1896 | John Drew Sperry | Liberal | Charles Edward Church | Liberal |
| 30th | 1890–1894 | John Drew Sperry | Liberal | Charles Edward Church | Liberal |
| 29th | 1889–1890 | John Drew Sperry | Liberal | Charles Edward Church | Liberal |
| 29th | 1886–1889 | George A. Ross | Liberal | Charles Edward Church | Liberal |
| 28th | 1882–1886 | George A. Ross | Liberal | Charles Edward Church | Liberal |
| 27th | 1878–1882 | Charles A. Smith | Liberal-Conservative | Edward James | Liberal-Conservative |
| 26th | 1876–1878 | Charles Henry Davison | Liberal | James Daniel Eisenhauer | Liberal |
| 26th | 1874–1876 | Mather Byles DesBrisay | Liberal | James Daniel Eisenhauer | Liberal |
| 25th | 1871–1874 | Mather Byles DesBrisay | Liberal | James Daniel Eisenhauer | Liberal |
| 24th | 1867–1871 | Mather Byles DesBrisay | Liberal | James Daniel Eisenhauer | Liberal |

== Election results ==
=== 2024 ===
2024 Nova Scotia general election
| Party | Candidate | Votes | % | ±% |
|---|---|---|---|---|
| Progressive Conservative | Susan Corkum-Greek | 4,308 | 60.16 | +18.15 |
| Liberal | Melissa Duggan | 1,496 | 20.89 | -13.66 |
| New Democratic | Nick Jennery | 1,185 | 16.55 | -4.19 |
| Green | Frank J. Fawson | 172 | 2.40 | +0.38 |
| Total | | 7,161 | – | |
| Total rejected / declined ballots | | 30 | 2 | |
| Turnout | | 7,193 | 46.54 | |
| Eligible voters | | 15,454 | | |
| Progressive Conservative hold | | Swing | | |
Source: Elections Nova Scotia

=== 2021 ===
2021 Nova Scotia general election
| Party | Candidate | Votes | % | ±% | Expenditures |
|---|---|---|---|---|---|
| Progressive Conservative | Susan Corkum-Greek | 3,544 | 42.01 | +11.10 | $36,920.96 |
| Liberal | Suzanne Lohnes-Croft | 2,915 | 34.55 | -4.93 | $35,114.26 |
| New Democratic | Alison Smith | 1,750 | 20.74 | -8.86 | $50,982.90 |
| Green | Thomas Trappenberg | 171 | 2.03 | +2.02 | $200.00 |
| Atlantica | John Giannakos | 57 | 0.67 | – | $200.00 |
| Total valid votes/expense limit | | 8,437 | – | – | $85,187.43 |
| Total rejected ballots | | 26 | 0.31 | | |
| Turnout | | 8,463 | 58.14 | | |
| Eligible voters | | 14,555 | | | |
| Progressive Conservative gain from Liberal | | Swing | | +8.02 | |
Source: Elections Nova Scotia

=== 2017 ===
2017 provincial election redistributed results
| Party | Vote | % |
|---|---|---|
| Liberal | 3,120 | 39.48 |
| Progressive Conservative | 2,443 | 30.91 |
| New Democratic | 2,339 | 29.60 |
| Green | 1 | 0.01 |

2017 Nova Scotia general election
| Party | Candidate | Votes | % | ±% |
|---|---|---|---|---|
| Liberal | Suzanne Lohnes-Croft | 3,110 | 39.45% | +1.64% |
| Progressive Conservative | Brian Pickings | 2,437 | 30.91% | +1.62% |
| New Democratic | Marc Breaugh | 2,336 | 29.63% | -3.26% |
| Total valid votes | | 7,883 | 100.00 | – |
| Total rejected ballots | | 68 | 0.84 | |
| Turnout | | 7,951 | 55.47 | |
| Eligible voters | | 14,333 | | |
| Liberal hold | | Swing | | +0.09 |
Source: Elections Nova Scotia

=== 2013 ===
2013 Nova Scotia general election
| Party | Candidate | Votes | % | ±% |
|---|---|---|---|---|
| Liberal | Suzanne Lohnes-Croft | 3,182 | 37.81% | 21.60% |
| New Democratic | Pam Birdsall | 2,768 | 32.89% | -15.11% |
| Progressive Conservative | Brian Pickings | 2,465 | 29.29% | 0.99% |
| Total | | 8,415 | – | |
Source(s) Source: Nova Scotia Legislature (2024). "Electoral History for Lunenburg Centre" (PDF). nslegislature.ca. Nova Scotia, Chief Electoral Officer (2013). 39th Provincial General Election, October 8, 2013: Volume 1 – Statement of Votes & Statistics (PDF) (Report). Elections Nova Scotia. Archived from the original (PDF) on 10 April 2018.

=== 2009 ===
2009 Nova Scotia general election
| Party | Candidate | Votes | % | ±% |
|---|---|---|---|---|
| New Democratic | Pam Birdsall | 4,069 | 48.01% | 13.79% |
| Progressive Conservative | Peter Zwicker | 2,399 | 28.30% | -20.37% |
| Liberal | Rick Welsford | 1,374 | 16.21% | 1.50% |
| Independent | Milton Countway | 489 | 5.77% | – |
| Green | Jason A. Remai | 145 | 1.71% | -0.69% |
| Total | | 8,476 | – | |
Source(s) Source: Nova Scotia Legislature (2024). "Electoral History for Lunenburg Centre" (PDF). nslegislature.ca.

=== 2006 ===
2006 Nova Scotia general election
| Party | Candidate | Votes | % | ±% |
|---|---|---|---|---|
| Progressive Conservative | Michael Baker | 3,969 | 48.67% | 2.31% |
| New Democratic | Chris Heide | 2,790 | 34.21% | 1.62% |
| Liberal | Rick Welsford | 1,200 | 14.71% | -6.33% |
| Green | Stewart Simpson | 196 | 2.40% | – |
| Total | | 8,155 | – | |
Source(s) Source: Nova Scotia Legislature (2024). "Electoral History for Lunenburg Centre" (PDF). nslegislature.ca.

=== 2003 ===
2003 Nova Scotia general election
| Party | Candidate | Votes | % | ±% |
|---|---|---|---|---|
| Progressive Conservative | Michael Baker | 3,734 | 46.36% | -5.12% |
| New Democratic | Chris Heide | 2,625 | 32.59% | 10.36% |
| Liberal | Jim Davis | 1,695 | 21.05% | -5.24% |
| Total | | 8,054 | – | |
Source(s) Source: Nova Scotia Legislature (2024). "Electoral History for Lunenburg Centre" (PDF). nslegislature.ca.

=== 1999 ===
1999 Nova Scotia general election
| Party | Candidate | Votes | % | ±% |
|---|---|---|---|---|
| Progressive Conservative | Michael Baker | 4,590 | 51.48% | 15.38% |
| Liberal | Lila O'Connor | 2,344 | 26.29% | -8.33% |
| New Democratic | Marilyn Keddy | 1,982 | 22.23% | -7.05% |
| Total | | 8,916 | – | |
Source(s) Source: Nova Scotia Legislature (2024). "Electoral History for Lunenburg Centre" (PDF). nslegislature.ca. Nova Scotia, Chief Electoral Officer (1999). Returns of the General Election for the House of Assembly, Thirty-Fifth General Election (Report). Elections Nova Scotia.

=== 1998 ===
1998 Nova Scotia general election
| Party | Candidate | Votes | % | ±% |
|---|---|---|---|---|
| Progressive Conservative | Michael Baker | 3,231 | 36.10% | -2.16% |
| Liberal | Lila O'Connor | 3,099 | 34.62% | -6.45% |
| New Democratic | Marilyn B. Crook | 2,621 | 29.28% | 13.94% |
| Total | | 8,951 | – | |
Source(s) Source: Nova Scotia Legislature (2024). "Electoral History for Lunenburg Centre" (PDF). nslegislature.ca.

=== 1993 ===
1993 Nova Scotia general election
| Party | Candidate | Votes | % | ±% |
|---|---|---|---|---|
| Liberal | Lila O'Connor | 3,982 | 41.07% | 32.98% |
| Progressive Conservative | Al Mosher | 3,709 | 38.26% | -8.26% |
| New Democratic | Wade Vernon Garrison | 1,487 | 15.34% | -1.22% |
| Independent | Walton Cook | 517 | 5.33% | – |
| Total | | 9,695 | – | |
Source(s) Source: Nova Scotia Legislature (2024). "Electoral History for Lunenburg Centre" (PDF). nslegislature.ca. Nova Scotia, Chief Electoral Officer (1993). Returns of the General Election for the House of Assembly, Thirty-Third General Election (PDF) (Report). Queen's Printer. Archived from the original (PDF) on 18 June 2018.

=== 1988 ===
1988 Nova Scotia general election: Lunenburg Centre
| Party | Candidate | Votes | % | ±% |
|---|---|---|---|---|
| Progressive Conservative | Al Mosher | 5,071 | 46.52% | -10.07% |
| Liberal | Don Zwicker | 4,024 | 36.92% | 8.09% |
| New Democratic | Muriel Maybee | 1,805 | 16.56% | 1.99% |
| Total | | 10,900 | – | |
Source(s) Source: Nova Scotia Legislature (2024). "Electoral History for Lunenburg Centre" (PDF). nslegislature.ca. Nova Scotia, Chief Electoral Officer (1988). Returns of the General Election for the House of Assembly, Thirty-Second General Election (PDF) (Report). Queen's Printer. Archived from the original (PDF) on 7 July 2018.

=== 1984 ===
1984 Nova Scotia general election: Lunenburg Centre
| Party | Candidate | Votes | % | ±% |
|---|---|---|---|---|
| Progressive Conservative | Maxine Cochran | 5,239 | 56.60% | 3.14% |
| Liberal | Linton M. (Lindy) Wentzell | 2,669 | 28.83% | -9.23% |
| New Democratic | Angus J. Fields | 1,349 | 14.57% | 6.10% |
| Total | | 9,257 | – | |
Source(s) Source: Nova Scotia Legislature (2024). "Electoral History for Lunenburg Centre" (PDF). nslegislature.ca. Nova Scotia, Chief Electoral Officer (1984). Returns of the General Election for the House of Assembly, Thirty-First General Election (PDF) (Report). Queen's Printer. Archived from the original (PDF) on 31 July 2017.

=== 1984 ===
Nova Scotia provincial by-election, 1984-02-12: Lunenburg Centre
| Party | Candidate | Votes | % | ±% |
|---|---|---|---|---|
| Progressive Conservative | Maxine Cochran | 5,078 | 53.46% | -0.94% |
| Liberal | John David Nause | 3,616 | 38.07% | 4.11% |
| New Democratic | Angus J. Fields | 805 | 8.47% | -3.17% |
| Total | | 9,499 | – | |
Source(s) Source: Nova Scotia Legislature (2024). "Electoral History for Lunenburg Centre" (PDF). nslegislature.ca. Nova Scotia, Chief Electoral Officer (1984). Returns of the General Election for the House of Assembly, Thirty-First General Election (PDF) (Report). Queen's Printer. Archived from the original (PDF) on 31 July 2017.

=== 1981 ===
1981 Nova Scotia general election: Lunenburg Centre
| Party | Candidate | Votes | % | ±% |
|---|---|---|---|---|
| Progressive Conservative | Bruce Cochran | 5,374 | 54.40% | -0.82% |
| Liberal | Alan V. Parish | 3,355 | 33.96% | 3.73% |
| New Democratic | Neil Theriault | 1,150 | 11.64% | 7.57% |
| Total | | 9,879 | – | |
Source(s) Source: Nova Scotia Legislature (2024). "Electoral History for Lunenburg Centre" (PDF). nslegislature.ca. Nova Scotia, Chief Electoral Officer (1981). Returns of the General Election for the House of Assembly, Thirtieth General Election (PDF) (Report). Queen's Printer. Archived from the original (PDF) on 31 July 2017.

=== 1978 ===
1978 Nova Scotia general election: Lunenburg Centre
| Party | Candidate | Votes | % | ±% |
|---|---|---|---|---|
| Progressive Conservative | Bruce Cochran | 5,764 | 55.22% | 14.04% |
| Liberal | Jack Pelley | 3,156 | 30.23% | -8.85% |
| Independent | Walton Cook | 1,094 | 10.48% | -5.02% |
| New Democratic | Scott D. Miller | 425 | 4.07% | -0.17% |
| Total | | 10,439 | – | |
Source(s) Source: Nova Scotia Legislature (2024). "Electoral History for Lunenburg Centre" (PDF). nslegislature.ca. Nova Scotia, Chief Electoral Officer (1978). Returns of the General Election for the House of Assembly, Twenty-Ninth General Election (PDF) (Report). Queen's Printer. Archived from the original (PDF) on 18 June 2018.

=== 1974 ===
1974 Nova Scotia general election: Lunenburg Centre
| Party | Candidate | Votes | % | ±% |
|---|---|---|---|---|
| Progressive Conservative | Bruce Cochran | 4,086 | 41.18% | -4.26% |
| Liberal | James Kinley | 3,878 | 39.08% | -15.48% |
| Independent | Walton Cook | 1,538 | 15.50% | – |
| New Democratic | Ralph E. Deamond | 421 | 4.24% | – |
| Total | | 9,923 | – | |
Source(s) Source: Nova Scotia Legislature (2024). "Electoral History for Lunenburg Centre" (PDF). nslegislature.ca. Nova Scotia, Chief Electoral Officer (1974). Returns of the General Election for the House of Assembly, Twenty-Eighth General Election (PDF) (Report). Queen's Printer. Archived from the original (PDF) on 18 June 2018.

=== 1970 ===
1970 Nova Scotia general election: Lunenburg Centre
| Party | Candidate | Votes | % | ±% |
|---|---|---|---|---|
| Liberal | Walton Cook | 4,852 | 54.57% | 8.81% |
| Progressive Conservative | George O. Lohnes | 4,040 | 45.43% | -6.03% |
| Total | | 8,892 | – | |
Source(s) Source: Nova Scotia Legislature (2024). "Electoral History for Lunenburg Centre" (PDF). nslegislature.ca. Nova Scotia, Legislative Assembly (1970). Returns of the General Election for the House of Assembly, 1970 (PDF) (Report). Queen's Printer. Archived from the original (PDF) on 25 July 2018.

=== 1967 ===
1967 Nova Scotia general election: Lunenburg Centre
| Party | Candidate | Votes | % | ±% |
|---|---|---|---|---|
| Progressive Conservative | George O. Lohnes | 4,229 | 51.46% | -5.60% |
| Liberal | Walton Cook | 3,760 | 45.75% | 2.81% |
| New Democratic | Earl Croft | 229 | 2.79% | – |
| Total | | 8,218 | – | |
Source(s) Source: Nova Scotia Legislature (2024). "Electoral History for Lunenburg Centre" (PDF). nslegislature.ca. Nova Scotia Legislature (1967). Returns of the General Election for the House of Assembly (PDF) (Report). Queen's Printer. Archived from the original (PDF) on 25 July 2018.

=== 1963 ===
1963 Nova Scotia general election: Lunenburg Centre
| Party | Candidate | Votes | % | ±% |
|---|---|---|---|---|
| Progressive Conservative | George O. Lohnes | 4,785 | 57.06% | 4.81% |
| Liberal | Leon J. Iversen | 3,601 | 42.94% | -2.73% |
| Total | | 8,386 | – | |
Source(s) Source: Nova Scotia Legislature (2024). "Electoral History for Lunenburg Centre" (PDF). nslegislature.ca. Nova Scotia Legislature (1963). Returns of the General Election for the House of Assembly (PDF) (Report). Queen's Printer. Archived from the original (PDF) on 25 July 2018.

=== 1960 ===
1960 Nova Scotia general election: Lunenburg Centre
| Party | Candidate | Votes | % | ±% |
|---|---|---|---|---|
| Progressive Conservative | George O. Lohnes | 4,384 | 52.25% | 1.28% |
| Liberal | Nathan S. Joudrey | 3,832 | 45.67% | -3.36% |
| Co-operative Commonwealth | Arthur Benedict | 175 | 2.09% | – |
| Total | | 8,391 | – | |
Source(s) Source: Nova Scotia Legislature (2024). "Electoral History for Lunenburg Centre" (PDF). nslegislature.ca. Nova Scotia Legislature (1960). Returns of the General Election for the House of Assembly (PDF) (Report). Queen's Printer. Archived from the original (PDF) on 25 July 2018.

=== 1956 ===
1956 Nova Scotia general election: Lunenburg Centre
| Party | Candidate | Votes | % | ±% |
|---|---|---|---|---|
| Progressive Conservative | George O. Lohnes | 3,995 | 50.97% | – |
| Liberal | Harold Uhlman | 3,843 | 49.03% | – |
| Total | | 7,838 | – | |
Source(s) Source: Nova Scotia Legislature (2024). "Electoral History for Lunenburg Centre" (PDF). nslegislature.ca. Nova Scotia Legislature (1956). Returns of the General Election for the House of Assembly (PDF) (Report). Queen's Printer. Archived from the original (PDF) on 10 September 2018.

=== 1953 ===
1953 Nova Scotia general election
| Party | Candidate | Votes | % | Elected |
|---|---|---|---|---|
| Progressive Conservative | Harley J. Spence | 8,741 | 27.12% | ✓ |
| Progressive Conservative | R. Clifford Levy | 8,727 | 27.07% | ✓ |
| Liberal | Gordon E. Romkey | 7,381 | 22.90% | |
| Liberal | Arthur L. Thurlow | 6,940 | 21.53% | |
| Co-operative Commonwealth | G. Boyd Crouse | 241 | 0.75% | |
| Co-operative Commonwealth | Winfred Llewellyn | 204 | 0.63% | |
| Total | | 32,234 | – | |
Source(s) Source: Nova Scotia Legislature (2024). "Electoral History for Lunenburg County" (PDF). nslegislature.ca. Nova Scotia Legislature (1953). Returns of the General Election for the House of Assembly (PDF) (Report). Queen's Printer. Archived from the original (PDF) on 10 September 2018.

=== 1949 ===
1949 Nova Scotia general election
| Party | Candidate | Votes | % | Elected |
|---|---|---|---|---|
| Liberal | Gordon E. Romkey | 7,814 | 25.69% | ✓ |
| Liberal | Arthur L. Thurlow | 7,145 | 23.49% | ✓ |
| Progressive Conservative | R. Clifford Levy | 6,935 | 22.80% | |
| Progressive Conservative | Fred Rhodenizer | 6,807 | 22.38% | |
| Co-operative Commonwealth | Lemuel O. Murphy | 871 | 2.86% | |
| Co-operative Commonwealth | Orris A. MacLaren | 844 | 2.77% | |
| Total | | 30,416 | – | |
Source(s) Source: Nova Scotia Legislature (2024). "Electoral History for Lunenburg County" (PDF). nslegislature.ca. Nova Scotia Legislature (1949). Returns of the General Election for the House of Assembly (PDF) (Report). Queen's Printer. Archived from the original (PDF) on 10 September 2018.

=== 1945 ===
1945 Nova Scotia general election
| Party | Candidate | Votes | % | Elected |
|---|---|---|---|---|
| Liberal | Frank R. Davis | 6,867 | 27.31% | ✓ |
| Liberal | Gordon E. Romkey | 6,839 | 27.20% | ✓ |
| Progressive Conservative | R. Clifford Levy | 5,854 | 23.28% | |
| Progressive Conservative | James A. MacLeod | 5,585 | 22.21% | |
| Total | | 25,145 | – | |
Source(s) Source: Nova Scotia Legislature (2024). "Electoral History for Lunenburg County" (PDF). nslegislature.ca. Nova Scotia Legislature (1945). Returns of the General Election for the House of Assembly (PDF) (Report). Queen's Printer. Archived from the original (PDF) on 10 September 2018.

=== 1941 ===
1941 Nova Scotia general election
| Party | Candidate | Votes | % | Elected |
|---|---|---|---|---|
| Liberal | Frank R. Davis | 6,366 | 29.39% | ✓ |
| Liberal | Gordon E. Romkey | 6,288 | 29.03% | ✓ |
| Progressive Conservative | R. Clifford Levy | 4,601 | 21.24% | |
| Progressive Conservative | Angus J. Walters | 4,404 | 20.33% | |
| Total | | 21,659 | – | |
Source(s) Source: Nova Scotia Legislature (2024). "Electoral History for Lunenburg County" (PDF). nslegislature.ca. Nova Scotia Legislature (1941). Returns of the General Election for the House of Assembly (PDF) (Report). Queen's Printer. Archived from the original (PDF) on 8 February 2024.

=== 1937 ===
1937 Nova Scotia general election
| Party | Candidate | Votes | % | Elected |
|---|---|---|---|---|
| Liberal | Frank R. Davis | 8,073 | 28.28% | ✓ |
| Liberal | Gordon E. Romkey | 7,796 | 27.31% | ✓ |
| Progressive Conservative | Vernon L. Pearson | 6,414 | 22.47% | |
| Progressive Conservative | Reginald E. Hyson | 6,268 | 21.95% | |
| Total | | 28,551 | – | |
Source(s) Source: Nova Scotia Legislature (2024). "Electoral History for Lunenburg County" (PDF). nslegislature.ca. Nova Scotia Legislature (1937). Returns of the General Election for the House of Assembly (PDF) (Report). Queen's Printer. Archived from the original (PDF) on 1 March 2019.

=== 1933 ===
1933 Nova Scotia general election
| Party | Candidate | Votes | % | Elected |
|---|---|---|---|---|
| Liberal | Gordon E. Romkey | 8,799 | 28.42% | ✓ |
| Liberal | Frank R. Davis | 8,369 | 27.03% | ✓ |
| Liberal-Conservative | Melbourne M. Gardner | 7,049 | 22.77% | |
| Liberal-Conservative | Wallace Norman Rehfuss | 6,744 | 21.78% | |
| Total | | 30,961 | – | |
Source(s) Source: Nova Scotia Legislature (2024). "Electoral History for Lunenburg County" (PDF). nslegislature.ca. Nova Scotia Legislature (1933). Returns of the General Election for the House of Assembly (PDF) (Report). Queen's Printer. Archived from the original (PDF) on 1 March 2019.

=== 1928 ===
1928 Nova Scotia general election
| Party | Candidate | Votes | % | Elected |
|---|---|---|---|---|
| Liberal | John James Kinley | 6,533 | 27.13% | ✓ |
| Liberal | Gordon E. Romkey | 6,304 | 26.18% | ✓ |
| Liberal-Conservative | Wallace Norman Rehfuss | 5,709 | 23.71% | |
| Liberal-Conservative | William Haslam Smith | 5,535 | 22.98% | |
| Total | | 24,081 | – | |
Source(s) Source: Nova Scotia Legislature (2024). "Electoral History for Lunenburg County" (PDF). nslegislature.ca.

=== 1925 ===
1925 Nova Scotia general election
| Party | Candidate | Votes | % | Elected |
|---|---|---|---|---|
| Liberal-Conservative | Wallace Norman Rehfuss | 7,159 | 31.34% | ✓ |
| Liberal-Conservative | William Haslam Smith | 6,902 | 30.21% | ✓ |
| Liberal | John James Kinley | 4,528 | 19.82% | |
| Liberal | Aubrey Sperry | 4,254 | 18.62% | |
| Total | | 22,843 | – | |
Source(s) Source: Nova Scotia Legislature (2024). "Electoral History for Lunenburg County" (PDF). nslegislature.ca.

=== 1920 ===
1920 Nova Scotia general election
| Party | Candidate | Votes | % | Elected |
|---|---|---|---|---|
| Liberal | John James Kinley | 4,900 | 30.24% | ✓ |
| Liberal | Aubrey Sperry | 4,795 | 29.60% | ✓ |
| Liberal-Conservative | Foster W. Verge | 3,270 | 20.18% | |
| Liberal-Conservative | Lemeau J. Hebb | 3,237 | 19.98% | |
| Total | | 16,202 | – | |
Source(s) Source: Nova Scotia Legislature (2024). "Electoral History for Lunenburg County" (PDF). nslegislature.ca.

=== 1916 ===
1916 Nova Scotia general election
| Party | Candidate | Votes | % | Elected |
|---|---|---|---|---|
| Liberal-Conservative | Joseph Willis Margeson | 3,282 | 27.30% | ✓ |
| Liberal | John James Kinley | 2,992 | 24.88% | ✓ |
| Liberal-Conservative | Alfred Clairmonte Zwicker | 2,982 | 24.80% | |
| Liberal | Oscar G. Donovan | 2,768 | 23.02% | |
| Total | | 12,024 | – | |
Source(s) Source: Nova Scotia Legislature (2024). "Electoral History for Lunenburg County" (PDF). nslegislature.ca.

=== 1911 ===
Nova Scotia provincial by-election, 1911-11-15
| Party | Candidate | Votes | % | Elected |
|---|---|---|---|---|
| Liberal-Conservative | Alfred Clairmonte Zwicker | 2,977 | 51.66% | ✓ |
| Liberal | William Duff | 2,786 | 48.34% | |
| Total | | 5,763 | – | |
Source(s) Source: Nova Scotia Legislature (2024). "Electoral History for Lunenburg County" (PDF). nslegislature.ca.

=== 1911 ===
1911 Nova Scotia general election
| Party | Candidate | Votes | % | Elected |
|---|---|---|---|---|
| Liberal | Alexander Kenneth Maclean | 3,136 | 27.98% | ✓ |
| Liberal-Conservative | Joseph Willis Margeson | 2,987 | 26.65% | ✓ |
| Liberal | Charles Uniacke Mader | 2,679 | 23.90% | |
| Liberal-Conservative | Alfred Clairmonte Zwicker | 2,405 | 21.46% | |
| Total | | 11,207 | – | |
Source(s) Source: Nova Scotia Legislature (2024). "Electoral History for Lunenburg County" (PDF). nslegislature.ca.

=== 1909 ===
Nova Scotia provincial by-election, 1909-11-24
| Party | Candidate | Votes | % | Elected |
|---|---|---|---|---|
| Liberal | Alexander Kenneth Maclean | 3,299 | 54.20% | ✓ |
| Liberal-Conservative | Joseph Willis Margeson | 2,788 | 45.80% | |
| Total | | 6,087 | – | |
Source(s) Source: Nova Scotia Legislature (2024). "Electoral History for Lunenburg County" (PDF). nslegislature.ca.

=== 1906 ===
1906 Nova Scotia general election
| Party | Candidate | Votes | % | Elected |
|---|---|---|---|---|
| Liberal | Charles Uniacke Mader | 2,274 | 26.12% | ✓ |
| Liberal | Henry March | 2,254 | 25.89% | ✓ |
| Liberal-Conservative | C. S. Marshall | 2,147 | 24.66% | |
| Liberal-Conservative | C. A. Larder | 2,031 | 23.33% | |
| Total | | 8,706 | – | |
Source(s) Source: Nova Scotia Legislature (2024). "Electoral History for Lunenburg County" (PDF). nslegislature.ca.

=== 1904 ===
Nova Scotia provincial by-election, 1904-12-08
| Party | Candidate | Votes | % | Elected |
|---|---|---|---|---|
| Liberal | Charles Uniacke Mader | acclaimed | N/A | ✓ |
| Total | | | – | |
Source(s) Source: Nova Scotia Legislature (2024). "Electoral History for Lunenburg County" (PDF). nslegislature.ca.

=== 1902 ===
Nova Scotia provincial by-election, 1902-12-03
| Party | Candidate | Votes | % | Elected |
|---|---|---|---|---|
| Liberal | John Drew Sperry | acclaimed | N/A | ✓ |
| Total | | | – | |
Source(s) Source: Nova Scotia Legislature (2024). "Electoral History for Lunenburg County" (PDF). nslegislature.ca.

=== 1901 ===
1901 Nova Scotia general election
| Party | Candidate | Votes | % | Elected |
|---|---|---|---|---|
| Liberal | Edward Doran Davison, Jr. | 2,932 | 28.24% | ✓ |
| Liberal | Alexander Kenneth Maclean | 2,923 | 28.15% | ✓ |
| Liberal-Conservative | A. J. Wolfe | 2,335 | 22.49% | |
| Liberal-Conservative | J. A. Roberts | 2,192 | 21.11% | |
| Total | | 10,382 | – | |
Source(s) Source: Nova Scotia Legislature (2024). "Electoral History for Lunenburg County" (PDF). nslegislature.ca.

=== 1897 ===
1897 Nova Scotia general election
| Party | Candidate | Votes | % | Elected |
|---|---|---|---|---|
| Liberal | John Drew Sperry | 2,581 | 25.52% | ✓ |
| Liberal | Charles Edward Church | 2,514 | 24.86% | ✓ |
| Liberal-Conservative | A. J. Wolff | 2,512 | 24.84% | |
| Liberal-Conservative | Emanuel Hebb | 2,507 | 24.79% | |
| Total | | 10,114 | – | |
Source(s) Source: Nova Scotia Legislature (2024). "Electoral History for Lunenburg County" (PDF). nslegislature.ca.

=== 1896 ===
Nova Scotia provincial by-election, 1896-08-15
| Party | Candidate | Votes | % | Elected |
|---|---|---|---|---|
| Liberal | Allan Moreash | 2,216 | 62.25% | ✓ |
| Liberal-Conservative | George A. Parker | 1,344 | 37.75% | |
| Total | | 3,560 | – | |
Source(s) Source: Nova Scotia Legislature (2024). "Electoral History for Lunenburg County" (PDF). nslegislature.ca.

=== 1894 ===
1894 Nova Scotia general election
| Party | Candidate | Votes | % | Elected |
|---|---|---|---|---|
| Liberal | John Drew Sperry | 2,648 | 27.92% | ✓ |
| Liberal | Charles Edward Church | 2,602 | 27.44% | ✓ |
| Liberal-Conservative | James A. McLean | 2,133 | 22.49% | |
| Liberal-Conservative | J. A. Hirtle | 2,101 | 22.15% | |
| Total | | 9,484 | – | |
Source(s) Source: Nova Scotia Legislature (2024). "Electoral History for Lunenburg County" (PDF). nslegislature.ca.

=== 1890 ===
1890 Nova Scotia general election
| Party | Candidate | Votes | % | Elected |
|---|---|---|---|---|
| Liberal | John Drew Sperry | 2,091 | 26.12% | ✓ |
| Liberal | Charles Edward Church | 2,033 | 25.39% | ✓ |
| Liberal-Conservative | James A. McLean | 1,960 | 24.48% | |
| Liberal-Conservative | Charles A. Smith | 1,922 | 24.01% | |
| Total | | 8,006 | – | |
Source(s) Source: Nova Scotia Legislature (2024). "Electoral History for Lunenburg County" (PDF). nslegislature.ca.

=== 1889 ===
Nova Scotia provincial by-election, 1889-01-16
| Party | Candidate | Votes | % | Elected |
|---|---|---|---|---|
| Liberal | John Drew Sperry | acclaimed | N/A | ✓ |
| Total | | | – | |
Source(s) Source: Nova Scotia Legislature (2024). "Electoral History for Lunenburg County" (PDF). nslegislature.ca.

=== 1886 ===
1886 Nova Scotia general election
| Party | Candidate | Votes | % | Elected |
|---|---|---|---|---|
| Liberal | Charles Edward Church | 1,924 | 29.13% | ✓ |
| Liberal | George A. Ross | 1,798 | 27.22% | ✓ |
| Liberal-Conservative | Charles A. Smith | 1,475 | 22.33% | |
| Liberal-Conservative | Aubrey B. Caldwell | 1,408 | 21.32% | |
| Total | | 6,605 | – | |
Source(s) Source: Nova Scotia Legislature (2024). "Electoral History for Lunenburg County" (PDF). nslegislature.ca.

=== 1882 ===
Nova Scotia provincial by-election, 1882-08-22
| Party | Candidate | Votes | % | Elected |
|---|---|---|---|---|
| Liberal | Charles Edward Church | acclaimed | N/A | ✓ |
| Total | | | – | |
Source(s) Source: Nova Scotia Legislature (2024). "Electoral History for Lunenburg County" (PDF). nslegislature.ca.

=== 1882 ===
1882 Nova Scotia general election
| Party | Candidate | Votes | % | Elected |
|---|---|---|---|---|
| Liberal | Charles Edward Church | 1,539 | 29.34% | ✓ |
| Liberal | George A. Ross | 1,436 | 27.38% | ✓ |
| Liberal-Conservative | Charles A. Smith | 1,195 | 22.78% | |
| Liberal-Conservative | W. R. Calder | 1,075 | 20.50% | |
| Total | | 5,245 | – | |
Source(s) Source: Nova Scotia Legislature (2024). "Electoral History for Lunenburg County" (PDF). nslegislature.ca.

=== 1878 ===
1878 Nova Scotia general election
| Party | Candidate | Votes | % | Elected |
|---|---|---|---|---|
| Liberal-Conservative | Charles A. Smith | 1,719 | 29.91% | ✓ |
| Liberal-Conservative | Edward James | 1,479 | 25.74% | ✓ |
| Liberal | F. B. Wade | 1,286 | 22.38% | |
| Liberal | James Daniel Eisenhauer | 1,263 | 21.98% | |
| Total | | 5,747 | – | |
Source(s) Source: Nova Scotia Legislature (2024). "Electoral History for Lunenburg County" (PDF). nslegislature.ca.

=== 1876 ===
Nova Scotia provincial by-election, 1876-09-27
| Party | Candidate | Votes | % | Elected |
|---|---|---|---|---|
| Liberal | Charles Henry Davison | 1,322 | 58.52% | ✓ |
| Liberal | Andrews | 937 | 41.48% | |
| Total | | 2,259 | – | |
Source(s) Source: Nova Scotia Legislature (2024). "Electoral History for Lunenburg County" (PDF). nslegislature.ca.

=== 1874 ===
1874 Nova Scotia general election
| Party | Candidate | Votes | % | Elected |
|---|---|---|---|---|
| Liberal | James Daniel Eisenhauer | 1,507 | 28.95% | ✓ |
| Liberal | Mather Byles DesBrisay | 1,423 | 27.34% | ✓ |
| Liberal-Conservative | William Young | 1,148 | 22.06% | |
| Liberal-Conservative | Edward James | 1,127 | 21.65% | |
| Total | | 5,205 | – | |
Source(s) Source: Nova Scotia Legislature (2024). "Electoral History for Lunenburg County" (PDF). nslegislature.ca.

=== 1871 ===
1871 Nova Scotia general election
| Party | Candidate | Votes | % | Elected |
|---|---|---|---|---|
| Liberal | Mather Byles DesBrisay | Acclaimed | N/A | ✓ |
| Liberal | James Daniel Eisenhauer | Acclaimed | N/A | ✓ |
| Total | | | – | |
Source(s) Source: Nova Scotia Legislature (2024). "Electoral History for Lunenburg County" (PDF). nslegislature.ca.

=== 1867 ===
1867 Nova Scotia general election
| Party | Candidate | Votes | % | Elected |
|---|---|---|---|---|
| Anti-Confederation | James Daniel Eisenhauer | 1,664 | 34.22% | ✓ |
| Anti-Confederation | Mather Byles DesBrisay | 1,553 | 31.94% | ✓ |
| Confederation | Henry S. Jost | 853 | 17.54% | |
| Confederation | W. A. C. Randall | 793 | 16.31% | |
| Total | | 4,863 | – | |
Source(s) Source: Nova Scotia Legislature (2024). "Electoral History for Lunenburg County" (PDF). nslegislature.ca.

== See also ==
- List of Nova Scotia provincial electoral districts
- Canadian provincial electoral districts
