= 46th General Assembly of Nova Scotia =

The 46th General Assembly of Nova Scotia represented Nova Scotia between February 27, 1957, and April 16, 1960.

== Division of seats ==
There were 43 members of the General Assembly, elected in the 1956 Nova Scotia general election.

Leader	Party	# of Seats
Henry D. Hicks	Liberal	18
Robert L. Stanfield	Progressive Conservative	24
Michael James MacDonald	CCF	1
Total		43

== List of members ==
Riding	Name	Party	First elected / previously elected	Position
Annapolis East	Henry Davies Hicks	Liberal	1945	
Annapolis West	Peter Murray Nicholson	Liberal	1956	
Antigonish	William F. MacKinnon	Progressive Conservative	1956	
Cape Breton South	Donald C. McNeil	Progressive Conservative	1956	
Cape Breton Centre	Michael MacDonald	CCF	1945	
Cape Breton North	John M. Macdonald	Progressive Conservative	1956	
Cape Breton Nova	Percy Gaum	Progressive Conservative	1956	
Cape Breton East	Layton Fergusson	Progressive Conservative	1956	
Cape Breton West	Edward Manson	Progressive Conservative	1956	
Clare	Pierre E. Belliveau	Liberal	1953	
Colchester	Robert L. Stanfield	Progressive Conservative	1949	Premier
Colchester	G. I. Smith	Progressive Conservative	1949	
Cumberland East	James A. Langille	Progressive Conservative	1953	
Cumberland West	Allison T. Smith	Liberal	1953	
Cumberland Centre	Stephen T. Pyke	Progressive Conservative	1953	Minister of Labour
Digby	Malcolm Stewart Leonard	Progressive Conservative	1956	Minister of Education
Guysborough	A. W. Cameron	Liberal	1956	
Halifax South	Richard A. Donahoe	Progressive Conservative	1954	
Halifax Centre	Gordon S. Cowan	Liberal	1956	
Halifax North	John E. Ahern	Liberal	1956	
Halifax Northwest	Ronald Manning Fielding	Liberal	1941	
Halifax East	Duncan MacMillan	Liberal	1956	
Halifax West	Charles H. Reardon	Liberal	1956	
Halifax County Dartmouth	Geoffrey W. Stevens	Liberal	1933	
Hants East	Ernest M. Ettinger	Progressive Conservative	1949, 1956	
Hants West	George H. Wilson	Progressive Conservative	1950	
Inverness	Joseph Clyde Nunn	Liberal	1954	
Inverness	Roderick MacLean	Liberal	1949	
Kings North	Eric Balcom	Liberal	1956	
Kings South	Edward Haliburton	Progressive Conservative	1953	Minister of Agriculture
Kings West	Hiram Thomas	Progressive Conservative	1956	
Lunenburg Centre	George O. Lohnes	Progressive Conservative	1956	
Lunenburg East	R. Clifford Levy	Progressive Conservative	1953	
Lunenburg East	Maurice L. Zinck (1959)	Progressive Conservative	1959	
Lunenburg West	Harley J. Spence	Progressive Conservative	1953	
Pictou East	William A. MacLeod	Progressive Conservative	1956	
Pictou West	Harvey Veniot	Progressive Conservative	1956	
Pictou Centre	Donald R. MacLeod	Progressive Conservative	1956	
Queens	W. S. Kennedy Jones	Progressive Conservative	1953	speaker
Richmond	Earl Wallace Urquhart	Liberal	1949	
Shelburne	James M. Harding	Progressive Conservative	1956	
Victoria	Carleton L. MacMillan	Liberal	1949	
Yarmouth	Willard O'Brien	Liberal	1956	
Yarmouth	Eric Spinney	Liberal	1956	

== Former members of the 46th General Assembly ==
Name	Party	Electoral District	Cause of departure	Succeeded by	Elected
R. Clifford Levy	Progressive Conservative	Lunenburg East		Maurice L. Zinck, PC	October 14, 1959

Preceded by 45th General Assembly of Nova Scotia	General Assemblies of Nova Scotia; 1956–1960	Succeeded by 47th General Assembly of Nova Scotia
