= Edward Doran Davison, Jr. =

Canadian politician from Nova Scotia (1845–1902)

Edward Doran Davison Jr.

Member of the Nova Scotia House of Assembly for Lunenburg
- In office October 2, 1901 – July 17, 1902

Personal details
- Born: April 15, 1845 Mill Village, Nova Scotia
- Died: July 17, 1902 (aged 57) Cherry Hill, Nova Scotia
- Party: Liberal
- Spouse(s): Alma M. Hickman; Margaret Robertson
- Relations: Charles Henry Davison (brother)
- Parent: Edward Doran Davison (father)
- Education: Mount Allison Academy
- Occupation: lumber merchant, politician

Edward Doran Davison Jr. (April 15, 1845 – July 17, 1902) was a lumber merchant and political figure in Nova Scotia, Canada. He represented Lunenburg in the Nova Scotia House of Assembly from 1901 to 1902 as a Liberal member.

Davison was born in 1845 at Mill Village, Nova Scotia to Edward Doran Davison and Desiah Mack. He was educated at Mount Allison Academy and was a brother of Charles Henry Davison. He married Alma M. Hickman, and later married Margaret Robertson on January 26, 1887. He served two terms as mayor of Bridgewater, Nova Scotia. Davison died in 1902 at Cherry Hill, Nova Scotia.

He was elected in the 1901 Nova Scotia general election, but died less than a year into the term. He was replaced in a by-election by Charles Uniacke Mader.
