= Joseph Willis Margeson =

Canadian politician

Member of the Nova Scotia House of Assembly for Lunenburg County
- In office 1911–1917
- Preceded by: Alfred Clairmonte Zwicker, Charles Uniacke Mader
- Succeeded by: Aubrey Sperry, John James Kinley

Personal details
- Born: April 2, 1880 Harbourville, Nova Scotia
- Died: October 2, 1925 (aged 45) Halifax, Nova Scotia
- Party: Liberal

Joseph Willis Margeson (April 2, 1880 – October 2, 1925) was an educator, lawyer and political figure in Nova Scotia, Canada. He represented Lunenburg County in the Nova Scotia House of Assembly from 1911 to 1917.

== Early life and education ==
He was born in Harborville, King's County, the son of Otis A. Margeson and Jennie Cahill. Margeson was educated at the provincial normal school, Acadia University and Dalhousie University.

== Career ==
He taught school for several years and was also principal of Berwick High School. He ran unsuccessfully for a seat in the provincial assembly in a 1909 by-election. Margeson resigned his seat in December 1917 to run unsuccessfully for a seat in the House of Commons. He was lieutenant in the militia and served as captain and then major overseas in France during World War I. In 1917, Margeson was named president of the Pay and Allowance Board of the Militia Department in Ottawa and he was promoted to lieutenant-colonel in 1918.

Margeson was a director of The News Company, which published the Daily News and Weekly News in Lunenburg. He was a member of the Freemasons and of the Independent Order of Foresters. He died in Halifax.

== Personal life ==
In 1908, he married Mary Gertrude McIntosh.
