= Lohnes =

Lohnes is a surname. Notable people with the surname include:

- Bruce Lohnes (born 1958), Canadian curler
- George O. Lohnes (1898–1982), Canadian politician
- Suzanne Lohnes-Croft, Canadian politician

== See also ==
- Johnes
