= Barkhouse =

Barkhouse is a surname. Notable people with the surname include:

- Jim Barkhouse (born 1940), Canadian politician
- Joyce Barkhouse (1913–2012), Canadian writer
- Ron Barkhouse (1926–2014), Canadian merchant, politician, and genealogist

== See also ==
- Barkhouse Settlement, Nova Scotia, a community in the Halifax Regional Municipality, Nova Scotia, Canada
