= John James Kinley =

Canadian industrialist and politician (1881–1971)

Member of the Canadian Parliament for Lunenburg
- In office 1935–1945
- Preceded by: Charles Edwin Kaulbach
- Succeeded by: Charles Edwin Kaulbach

Member of the Nova Scotia House of Assembly for Lunenburg
- In office 1916–1925
- Preceded by: Alfred Clairmonte Zwicker
- Succeeded by: Wallace Norman Rehfuss, William Haslam Smith

Member of the Nova Scotia House of Assembly for Lunenburg
- In office 1928–1930
- Preceded by: Wallace Norman Rehfuss, William Haslam Smith
- Succeeded by: Frank R. Davis

Senator from Nova Scotia
- In office 1945–1971

Personal details
- Born: October 15, 1881 Lunenburg, Nova Scotia
- Died: August 23, 1971 (aged 89)
- Party: Liberal

John James Kinley (October 15, 1881 – August 23, 1971) was an industrialist, pharmaceutical chemist, journalist, ship owner and political figure in Nova Scotia, Canada. He represented Lunenburg County in the Nova Scotia House of Assembly from 1916 to 1925 and from 1928 to 1930 and Queens—Lunenburg in the House of Commons of Canada from 1935 to 1945 as a Liberal member. Kinley sat for Queens-Lunenburg division in the Senate of Canada from 1945 to 1971.

== Early life and education ==
He was born in Lunenburg, Nova Scotia, the son of Captain James Francis Kinley and Louisa Annette Loye. He was educated at the Lunenburg County Academy.

== Career ==
Kinley worked with druggist E. L. Nash for a number of years before establishing his own business Kinley Drug Company in Lunenburg in 1900. In 1912, he opened a second drug store in Halifax with his brother as partner. He married Lila Evelyn Dowling Young in 1920. John James and Lila had three children, Mary, John James Junior and James Edward. Kinley was the youngest mayor of the town of Lunenburg from 1911 to 1913. He was president of the Lunenburg Foundry Company Ltd. Kinley was a minister without portfolio in the province's Executive Council from 1923 to 1925. He served during World War I and was awarded the King Haakon VII Freedom Cross by King Haakon VII for distinguished service to Norway during World War II. Kinley ran unsuccessfully for a seat in the House of Commons in 1930.

== Personal life ==
His son, James Kinley, served as Lieutenant Governor of Nova Scotia from 1994 to 2000.
