= Lila O'Connor =

Canadian politician

MLA for Lunenburg
- In office 1993–1998
- Preceded by: new riding
- Succeeded by: Michael Baker

Personal details
- Born: 1940
- Died: December 5, 2017 (aged 77)
- Party: Liberal

Lila O'Connor (1940 – December 5, 2017) was a Canadian politician. She represented the electoral district of Lunenburg in the Nova Scotia House of Assembly from 1993 to 1998. She was a member of the Nova Scotia Liberal Party.

After an unsuccessful attempt to win the provincial Liberal nomination in a Lunenburg area riding in 1988, O'Connor turned to municipal politics and was elected a town councilor in Mahone Bay, Nova Scotia.

She held the seat until resigning in 1993 to enter provincial politics. In the 1993 election, she was elected MLA for Lunenburg, defeating the incumbent from Lunenburg Centre, Al Mosher by 273 votes.

She served as a backbench member of John Savage's government. She was defeated by Progressive Conservative Michael Baker when she ran for re-election in the 1998 election. She was again nominated as the Liberal candidate in the riding for the 1999 election, but was again defeated by Baker. O'Connor returned to municipal politics in 2000, and served as a town councillor in Mahone Bay for 12 years, before being defeated in 2012.

== Death ==
Lila O'Connor died in December 2017.
