= Frank R. Davis =

Canadian politician

MLA for Lunenburg County
- In office 1933–1948
- Preceded by: John James Kinley
- Succeeded by: Arthur L. Thurlow

Personal details
- Born: August 25, 1888 Shelburne, Nova Scotia
- Died: September 17, 1948 (aged 60) Ingonish, Nova Scotia
- Party: Nova Scotia Liberal Party
- Occupation: physician, surgeon

Frank Roy Davis (August 25, 1888 – September 17, 1948) was a Canadian provincial politician from Nova Scotia. He represented the electoral district of Lunenburg in the Nova Scotia House of Assembly from 1933 to 1948. He was a member of the Nova Scotia Liberal Party.

Davis was born in 1888 at Shelburne, Nova Scotia. His parents were Joseph Hiram Davis and the former Eva Trueman. He was educated at Mount Allison University and Dalhousie University, and was a physician and surgeon by career. He married Elizabeth Euphemia Balcom in 1913.

Davis was elected mayor of Bridgewater, Nova Scotia in 1930. He entered provincial politics in the 1933 election, winning a seat for the dual-member Lunenburg riding with Liberal Gordon E. Romkey. Davis was re-elected in the 1937, 1941, and 1945 elections. He served in the Executive Council of Nova Scotia as Minister of Health and Welfare from 1933, also taking the role of Registrar General and Minister of Municipal Affairs in 1945. He therefore served in cabinets led by premiers Angus Macdonald (twice) and Alexander MacMillan. He died in office on September 17, 1948.
