= Arthur L. Thurlow =

Canadian judge (1913–2020)

The Honourable Arthur L. Thurlow OC QC
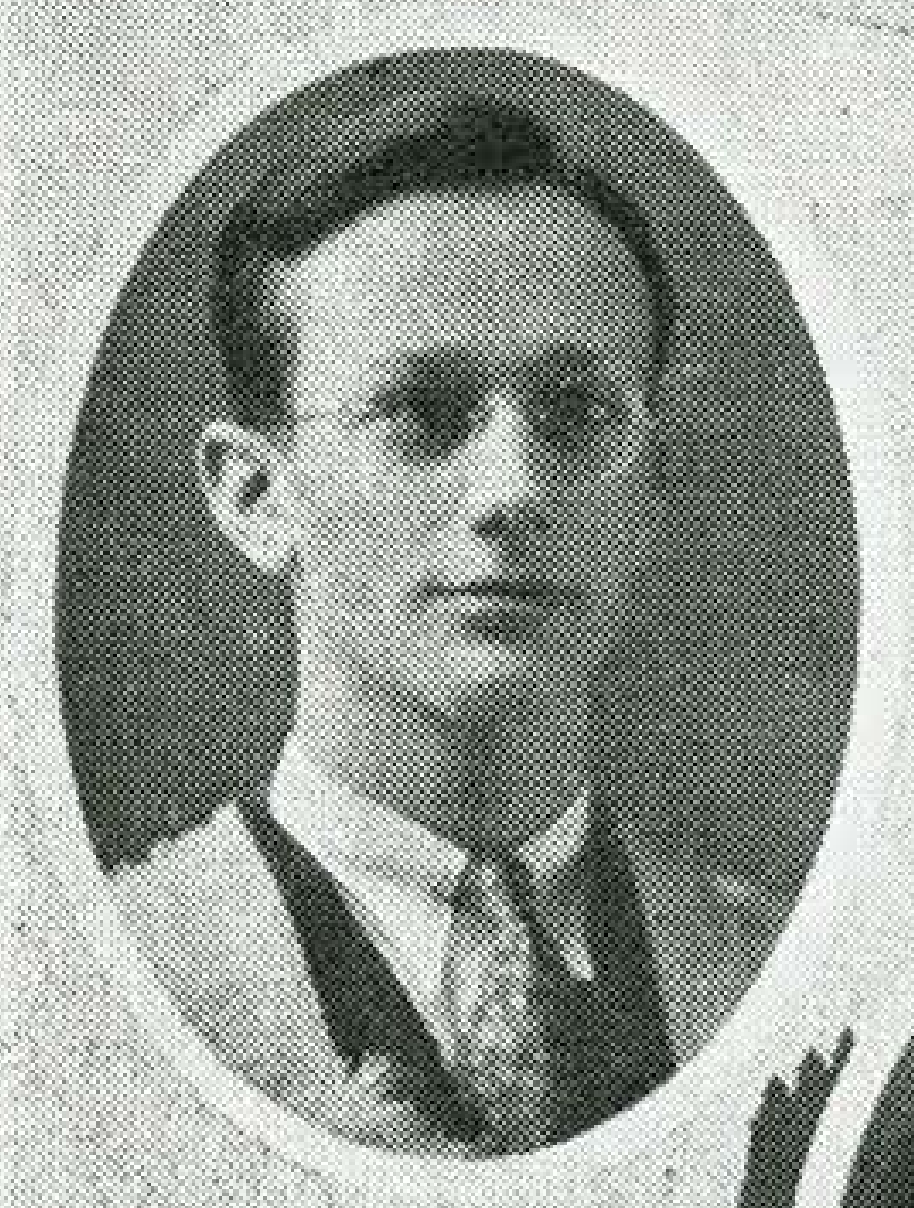
- Thurlow pictured at Dalhousie University c. 1933

MLA for Lunenburg County
- In office 1949–1953
- Preceded by: Frank R. Davis
- Succeeded by: Harley J. Spence; R. Clifford Levy

Personal details
- Born: May 5, 1913 Lunenburg, Nova Scotia, Canada
- Died: May 27, 2020 (aged 107) Ottawa, Ontario, Canada
- Party: Liberal
- Spouse: Mabel Rosina Maxwell (m. 1941–2006)
- Children: one
- Education: Dalhousie University
- Profession: lawyer, judge

Arthur Louis Thurlow OC QC (May 5, 1913 – May 27, 2020) was a Canadian politician and judge. He represented the electoral district of Lunenburg County in the Nova Scotia House of Assembly from 1949 to 1953. He was a member of the Nova Scotia Liberal Party.

== Early life and education ==
Thurlow was born in 1913 at Lunenburg, Nova Scotia, son of Maude (Kinley) and Charles Thurlow. He was educated at Dalhousie University, and was a lawyer by career. He married Mabel R. Maxwell in 1941.

== Political career ==
Thurlow entered provincial politics in 1949, when he was elected in the dual-member Lunenburg County riding with Liberal Gordon E. Romkey. In the 1953 election, Thurlow and Romkey were both defeated, losing the riding to Progressive Conservative's Harley J. Spence and R. Clifford Levy.

== Judiciary ==
Thurlow was appointed a judge in 1956, serving from 1956 to 1971 as puisne judge of the Exchequer Court of Canada, from 1971 to 1975 as judge of the Federal Court of Appeal, from December 4, 1975 to January 3, 1980 as associate chief justice of the Federal Court of Canada. On January 4, 1980, Thurlow was appointed chief justice of the Federal Court of Canada, serving until his retirement on May 5, 1988.

== Later life ==
Thurlow was appointed an Officer of the Order of Canada in April 1992. Thurlow celebrated his 100th birthday in May 2013, and died on May 27, 2020.
