= Hinrich Bitter-Suermann =

Canadian politician (born 1940)

MLA for Chester-St. Margaret's
- In office 1998–1999
- Preceded by: Jim Barkhouse
- Succeeded by: John Chataway

Personal details
- Born: March 10, 1940 (age 86) Kiel, Germany
- Party: Progressive Conservative (until 1998); New Democratic Party (since 1998)
- Occupation: Pathologist

Hinrich Bitter-Suermann (born March 10, 1940) is a German-Canadian pathologist and professor of surgery specialized in organ transplantation.

== Education ==
Bitter-Suermann studied 1959-1965 medicine and sciences at Würzburg University, Göttingen University and Kiel University. In Würzburg he became a member of the German Student Corps Nassovia and in Göttingen he joined the Corps Hannovera (1960). In 1965 he accomplished his studies and summa cum laude graduated Dr. med. in Göttingen.

== Career ==
Bitter-Suermann had his clinical education in Germany and Sweden, i. e. in Kiel, Kiruna and Haparanda. From 1971 to 1973 he worked at Addenbrooke's Hospital, Cambridge, as Honorary Senior Registrar and Transplant Fellow under Sir Roy Yorke Calne. His research interests focused on induction of transplantation tolerance by spleen transplants in rats and the preservation of pig liver transplants.

He returned to Sweden and in 1974 joined the Department of Surgery, Sahlgrenska University Hospital, headed by Lars-Erik Gelin. In 1975 the University of Gothenburg granted him the Ph.D. and made him "Docent" in transplant surgery.

Funded by the Swedish Cancer Society, Bitter-Suermann in 1976–77 was Visiting Scientist to the Cancer Research Unit, McGill University, Montreal, Quebec, Canada. He performed research in spleen grafts versus chemically induced tumours in rats.

From 1977 through 1982 he was staff of the Department of Pathology, Georgetown University, Washington, D.C. Supported by the National Institutes of Health he studied the mechanisms of spleen graft induced transplantation tolerance in guinea pigs, and islet transplantation in rats. At the same time he collaborated with Ethan M.Shevach as visiting scientist at the National Institute of Allergy and Infectious Diseases (NIAID), Bethesda, Maryland. In 1977 he was appointed associate professor and in 1981 professor of Georgetown University.

He left Georgetown University in 1982 to become Professor of Surgery and Director of the Liver Transplant Program at Dalhousie University, Halifax, Nova Scotia, Canada. At the Queen Elizabeth II Health Sciences Centre and I.W.K. Hospital for Children he engaged himself for 24 years in kidney, liver and pancreas transplantation. He initiated successfully the Liver Transplant Program for Atlantic Canada, then Canada's third program.

After forty years abroad he returned to Germany to assume the position of Director of Dialysis Surgery, Department of Surgery, Heidelberg University at Mannheim Medical School. In 2012, Robert-Bosch-Krankenhaus, Stuttgart, appointed him Director of the Shunt-Surgery Center. In 2019 he was appointed Head of the Shunt Surgery Center at the Helios Hospital, Blankenhain, Thuringia.

== Political career ==
In 1998, Bitter-Suermann was elected to the Nova Scotia House of Assembly, defeating Liberal cabinet minister Jim Barkhouse by 110 votes in the Chester-St. Margaret's riding. Elected as a member of the Progressive Conservatives, Bitter-Suermann broke party ranks in June 1998 to vote against the Liberals minority government budget. In October, he quit the Progressive Conservative caucus to sit as an independent member, before crossing the floor in November to join the Nova Scotia New Democratic Party. He ran for re-election in 1999, but was defeated by Progressive Conservative John Chataway.

On March 31, 2000, Bitter-Suermann announced his candidacy for the leadership of the Nova Scotia New Democratic Party, following the resignation of Robert Chisholm. At the July 2000 leadership election, Bitter-Suermann finished last on the first ballot with 31 votes.

Bitter-Suermann ran again in the 2003 election, but lost to Chataway by 39 votes. Following Chataway's death in December 2004, Bitter-Suermann was nominated as the NDP candidate for the byelection to replace him. On June 21, 2005, Bitter-Suerman finished third in the byelection, losing to Progressive Conservative candidate Judy Streatch.
