= Walton Cook =

Canadian politician

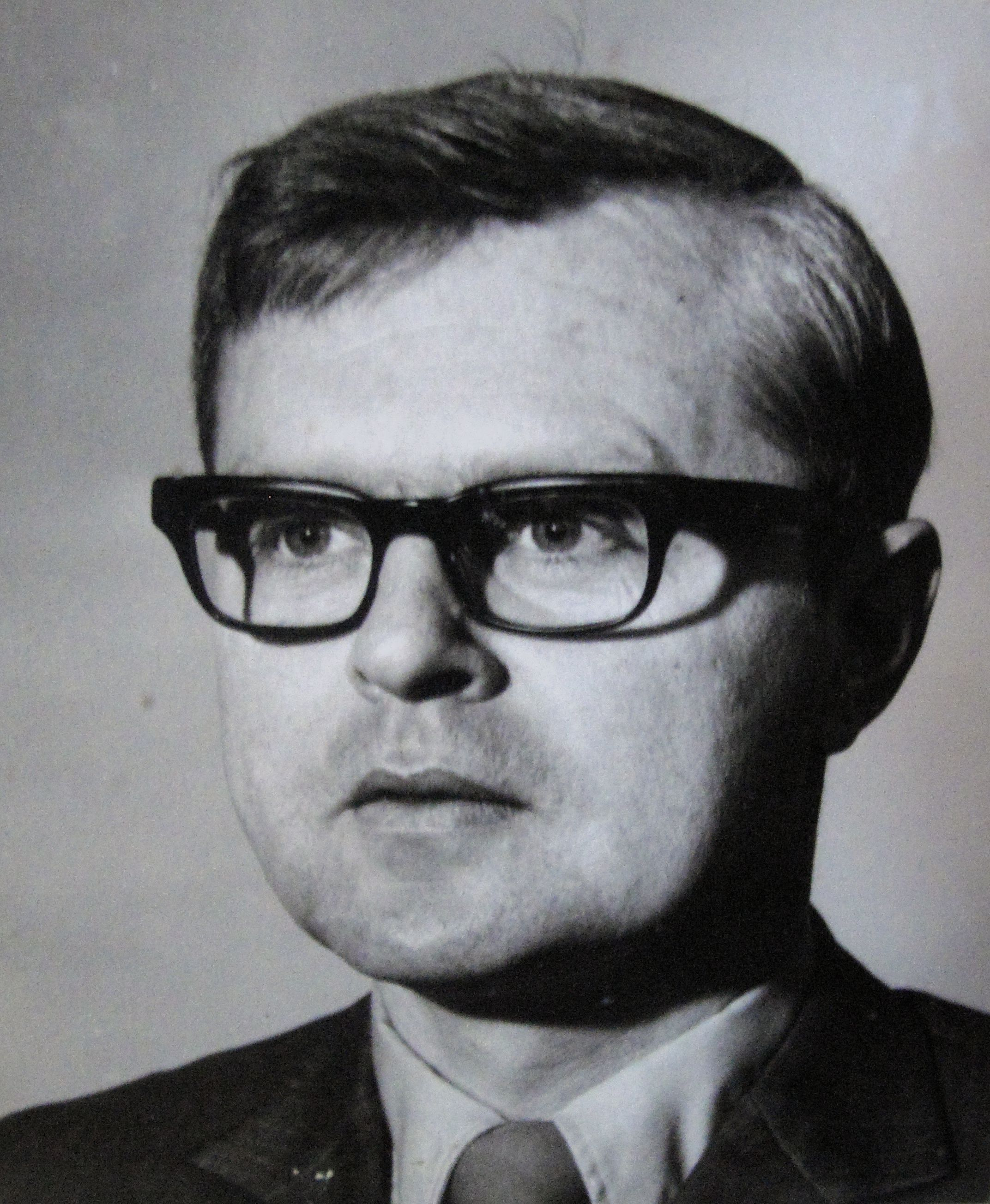
- Cook, c. 1973

MLA for Lunenburg Centre
- In office 1970–1974
- Preceded by: George O. Lohnes
- Succeeded by: Bruce Cochran

Personal details
- Born: May 12, 1933 Bridgewater, Nova Scotia
- Died: April 20, 2008 (aged 74) Lunenburg, Nova Scotia
- Party: Nova Scotia Liberal Party
- Occupation: Lawyer

Walton William Cook (May 12, 1933 – April 20, 2008) was a Canadian lawyer and politician. He represented the electoral district of Lunenburg Centre in the Nova Scotia House of Assembly from 1970 to 1974. He was a member of the Nova Scotia Liberal Party.

Cook was born in Bridgewater, Nova Scotia. A lawyer, he attended Dalhousie University for his Bachelor of Laws (L.L.B.) degree. In 1962, he married Judith Isabelle Keddy. He died at home in Lunenburg in 2008.
