= Clifford Levy =

Clifford Levy may refer to:

- Clifford J. Levy (born 1967), American publisher
- R. Clifford Levy (1905–1971), Canadian politician
