= Rehfuss =

Rehfuss is a surname. Notable people with the surname include:

- Heinz Rehfuss (1917–1988), Swiss-American operatic bass-baritone
- Wallace Norman Rehfuss (1876–1929), Canadian physician and political figure
