= Chester-St. Margaret's =

Provincial electoral district in Nova Scotia, Canada

Nova Scotia electoral district

Provincial electoral district
- Legislature: Nova Scotia House of Assembly
MLA
Danielle Barkhouse
Progressive Conservative
- District created: 1956
- Last contested: 2024

Demographics
- Population (2011): 20,368
- Electors: 15,291
- Area (km²): 1,661
- Pop. density (per km²): 12.3
- Census division(s): Halifax RM, Lunenburg County

Chester—St. Margaret's is a provincial electoral district in Nova Scotia, Canada, that elects one member of the Nova Scotia House of Assembly. It is located on the South Shore.

The constituency was created in 1956 as a division of Lunenburg County. It was called Lunenburg East from 1956 to 1993. In 1993, the district was renamed Chester—St. Margaret's and gained Tancook Islands from Lunenburg Centre and St. Margaret's Bay from Halifax St. Margarets. In 2003, it gained the communities of West Dover and Bayside. In 2012, the district lost the Upper Tantallon area north of Highway 103 to Hammonds Plains-Lucasville.

The district includes the Municipality of Chester and the communities in the Halifax Regional Municipality along the coast of St. Margarets Bay including Peggys Cove. Major towns in the riding include Hubbards, Chester, Western Shore, Boutiliers Point and Head of St. Margarets Bay.

== Geography ==
The land area of Chester-St. Margaret's is 1,661 km^{2} (641 sq mi).

== Statistics ==
Avg. Income: $27,440 (2003)
Population: 19,720 (2003)
Post-secondary education: 36% (2003)

== Members of the Legislative Assembly ==
This riding has elected the following members of the Legislative Assembly:

Legislature	Years	Member	Party
Lunenburg East; Riding created from Lunenburg
46th	1956–1959	R. Clifford Levy	Progressive Conservative
46th	1959–1960	Maurice L. Zinck	Progressive Conservative
47th	1960–1963	Maurice L. Zinck	Progressive Conservative
48th	1963–1967	Maurice L. Zinck	Progressive Conservative
49th	1967–1970	Maurice L. Zinck	Progressive Conservative
50th	1970–1974	Maurice L. Zinck	Progressive Conservative
51st	1974–1978	Ron Barkhouse	Progressive Conservative
52nd	1978–1981	Ron Barkhouse	Progressive Conservative
53rd	1981–1984	Ron Barkhouse	Progressive Conservative
54th	1984–1988	Jim Barkhouse	Liberal
55th	1988–1993	Jim Barkhouse	Liberal
Chester-St. Margaret's
56th	1993–1998	Jim Barkhouse	Liberal
57th	1998–1998	Hinrich Bitter-Suermann	Progressive Conservative
57th	1998–1999	Hinrich Bitter-Suermann	New Democratic
58th	1999–2003	John Chataway	Progressive Conservative
59th	2003–2005	John Chataway	Progressive Conservative
59th	2005–2006	Judy Streatch	Progressive Conservative
60th	2006–2009	Judy Streatch	Progressive Conservative
61st	2009–2013	Denise Peterson-Rafuse	New Democratic
62nd	2013–2017	Denise Peterson-Rafuse	New Democratic
63rd	2017–2020	Hugh MacKay	Liberal
63rd	2020–2021	Hugh MacKay	Independent
64th	2021–2024	Danielle Barkhouse	Progressive Conservative
65th	2024–present	Danielle Barkhouse	Progressive Conservative

== Election results ==
=== 2024 ===
2024 Nova Scotia general election
Party	Candidate	Votes	%	±%
Progressive Conservative	Danielle Barkhouse	4,806	58.21	+18.15
Liberal	Laura Mulrooney	2,160	26.16	-11.45
New Democratic	Brendan Mosher	1,290	15.63	-1.57
Total		8,256	–	
Total rejected / declined ballots		62	2	
Turnout		8,320	50.36	
Eligible voters		16,521		
Progressive Conservative hold		Swing		
Source: Elections Nova Scotia

=== 2021 ===
2021 Nova Scotia general election
Party	Candidate	Votes	%	±%	Expenditures
Progressive Conservative	Danielle Barkhouse	3,788	40.06	+14.40	$76,695.05
Liberal	Jacob Killawee	3,556	37.61	+2.38	$67,872.46
New Democratic	Amy Reitsma	1,626	17.20	-17.23	$50,011.78
Green	Jessica Alexander	417	4.41	-0.27	$10,917.97
Atlantica	Steven Foster	68	0.72	–	$200.00
Total valid votes/expense limit		9,455	99.62	-0.17	$88,319.62
Total rejected ballots		36	0.38	+0.17	
Turnout		9,491	62.48	+4.88	
Eligible voters		15,191			
Progressive Conservative gain from Liberal		Swing		+6.01	
Source: Elections Nova Scotia

=== 2017 ===
2017 provincial election redistributed results
Party	Vote	%
Liberal	2,934	35.23
New Democratic	2,867	34.43
Progressive Conservative	2,137	25.66
Green	390	4.68

2017 Nova Scotia general election
Party	Candidate	Votes	%	±%
Liberal	Hugh MacKay	3,112	35.46	+4.40
New Democratic	Denise Peterson-Rafuse	3,021	34.42	-0.82
Progressive Conservative	Julie Chaisson	2,230	25.41	-8.29
Green	Harry Ward	413	4.71	–
Total valid votes		8,776	100	
Total rejected ballots		32	0.21	
Turnout		8,808	57.60	
Eligible voters		15,291		
Liberal gain from New Democratic		Swing		+2.61
Source: Elections Nova Scotia

=== 2013 ===
2013 Nova Scotia general election
Party	Candidate	Votes	%	±%
New Democratic	Denise Peterson-Rafuse	3,341	35.25%	-12.84%
Progressive Conservative	Janet E. Irwin	3,193	33.69%	6.22%
Liberal	Tim W. Harris	2,943	31.05%	9.95%
Total		9,477	–	
Source(s) Source: Nova Scotia Legislature (2024). "Electoral History for Chester-St. Margaret's" (PDF). nslegislature.ca. Nova Scotia, Chief Electoral Officer (2013). 39th Provincial General Election, October 8, 2013: Volume 1 – Statement of Votes & Statistics (PDF) (Report). Elections Nova Scotia. Archived from the original (PDF) on 10 April 2018.

=== 2009 ===
2009 Nova Scotia general election
Party	Candidate	Votes	%	±%
New Democratic	Denise Peterson-Rafuse	4,835	48.09%	17.45%
Progressive Conservative	Judy Streatch	2,762	27.47%	-15.18%
Liberal	Jo-Ann Grant	2,122	21.11%	-2.56%
Green	Ryan Cameron	335	3.33%	0.29%
Total		10,054	–	
Source(s) Source: Nova Scotia Legislature (2024). "Electoral History for Chester-St. Margaret's" (PDF). nslegislature.ca.

=== 2006 ===
2006 Nova Scotia general election
Party	Candidate	Votes	%	±%
Progressive Conservative	Judy Streatch	3,950	42.65%	6.38%
New Democratic	Jane Matheson	2,838	30.64%	0.77%
Liberal	Rick Fraughton	2,192	23.67%	-7.61%
Green	Joanne MacKinnon	282	3.04%	0.47%
Total		9,262	–	
Source(s) Source: Nova Scotia Legislature (2024). "Electoral History for Chester-St. Margaret's" (PDF). nslegislature.ca.

=== 2005 by-election ===
Nova Scotia provincial by-election, June 21, 2005
Party	Candidate	Votes	%	±%
Progressive Conservative	Judy Streatch	2,955	36.27%	-1.02%
Liberal	Rick Fraughton	2,548	31.28%	6.97%
New Democratic	Hinrich Bitter-Suermann	2,434	29.88%	-7.00%
Green	Michael Oddy	210	2.58%	–
Total		8,147	–	
Source(s) Source: Nova Scotia Legislature (2024). "Electoral History for Chester-St. Margaret's" (PDF). nslegislature.ca.

=== 2003 ===
2003 Nova Scotia general election
Party	Candidate	Votes	%	±%
Progressive Conservative	John Chataway	3,451	37.30%	-7.97%
New Democratic	Hinrich Bitter-Suermann	3,412	36.87%	3.43%
Liberal	Milt Larsen	2,249	24.31%	3.03%
Nova Scotia Party	Sue Gault	141	1.52%	–
Total		9,253	–	
Source(s) Source: Nova Scotia Legislature (2024). "Electoral History for Chester-St. Margaret's" (PDF). nslegislature.ca.

=== 1999 ===
1999 Nova Scotia general election
Party	Candidate	Votes	%	±%
Progressive Conservative	John Chataway	4,193	45.27%	10.06%
New Democratic	Hinrich Bitter-Suermann	3,098	33.45%	2.76%
Liberal	Karen Willis Duerdin	1,971	21.28%	-12.82%
Total		9,262	–	
Source(s) Source: Nova Scotia Legislature (2024). "Electoral History for Chester-St. Margaret's" (PDF). nslegislature.ca. Nova Scotia, Chief Electoral Officer (1999). Returns of the General Election for the House of Assembly, Thirty-Fifth General Election (Report). Elections Nova Scotia.

=== 1998 ===
1998 Nova Scotia general election
Party	Candidate	Votes	%	±%
Progressive Conservative	Hinrich Bitter-Suermann	3,256	35.22%	5.72%
Liberal	Jim Barkhouse	3,153	34.10%	-17.59%
New Democratic	Doris Maley	2,837	30.68%	13.77%
Total		9,246	–	
Source(s) Source: Nova Scotia Legislature (2024). "Electoral History for Chester-St. Margaret's" (PDF). nslegislature.ca.

=== 1993 ===
1993 Nova Scotia general election
Party	Candidate	Votes	%	±%
Liberal	Jim Barkhouse	5,025	51.69%	1.67%
Progressive Conservative	Aileen Heisler	2,867	29.49%	-9.42%
New Democratic	Jack Ross	1,644	16.91%	6.61%
Independent	Malcolm Callaway	185	1.90%	1.14%
Total		9,721	–	
Source(s) Source: Nova Scotia Legislature (2024). "Electoral History for Chester-St. Margaret's" (PDF). nslegislature.ca. Nova Scotia, Chief Electoral Officer (1993). Returns of the General Election for the House of Assembly, Thirty-Third General Election (PDF) (Report). Queen's Printer. Archived from the original (PDF) on 18 June 2018.

=== 1988 ===
1988 Nova Scotia general election: Lunenburg East
Party	Candidate	Votes	%	±%
Liberal	Jim Barkhouse	3,024	50.02%	0.96%
Progressive Conservative	Richard P. Eldridge	2,352	38.91%	6.81%
New Democratic	Wanda Broome	623	10.31%	-8.53%
Independent	Malcolm Callaway	46	0.76%	–
Total		6,045	–	
Source(s) Source: Nova Scotia Legislature (2024). "Electoral History for Lunenburg East" (PDF). nslegislature.ca. Nova Scotia, Chief Electoral Officer (1988). Returns of the General Election for the House of Assembly, Thirty-Second General Election (PDF) (Report). Queen's Printer. Archived from the original (PDF) on 7 July 2018.

=== 1984 ===
1984 Nova Scotia general election: Lunenburg East
Party	Candidate	Votes	%	±%
Liberal	Jim Barkhouse	2,696	49.06%	25.70%
Progressive Conservative	David Hatt	1,764	32.10%	-23.38%
New Democratic	Janet Mooney	1,035	18.84%	-2.31%
Total		5,495	–	
Source(s) Source: Nova Scotia Legislature (2024). "Electoral History for Lunenburg East" (PDF). nslegislature.ca. Nova Scotia, Chief Electoral Officer (1984). Returns of the General Election for the House of Assembly, Thirty-First General Election (PDF) (Report). Queen's Printer. Archived from the original (PDF) on 31 July 2017.

=== 1981 ===
1981 Nova Scotia general election: Lunenburg East
Party	Candidate	Votes	%	±%
Progressive Conservative	Ron Barkhouse	2,802	55.49%	-11.45%
Liberal	Dave Cook	1,180	23.37%	-4.64%
New Democratic	Janet Mooney	1,068	21.15%	16.09%
Total		5,050	–	
Source(s) Source: Nova Scotia Legislature (2024). "Electoral History for Lunenburg East" (PDF). nslegislature.ca. Nova Scotia, Chief Electoral Officer (1981). Returns of the General Election for the House of Assembly, Thirtieth General Election (PDF) (Report). Queen's Printer. Archived from the original (PDF) on 31 July 2017.

=== 1978 ===
1978 Nova Scotia general election: Lunenburg East
Party	Candidate	Votes	%	±%
Progressive Conservative	Ron Barkhouse	3,386	66.93%	13.89%
Liberal	Wally MacDonald	1,417	28.01%	-13.05%
New Democratic	Robert Whiting, Sr.	256	5.06%	-0.84%
Total		5,059	–	
Source(s) Source: Nova Scotia Legislature (2024). "Electoral History for Lunenburg East" (PDF). nslegislature.ca. Nova Scotia, Chief Electoral Officer (1978). Returns of the General Election for the House of Assembly, Twenty-Ninth General Election (PDF) (Report). Queen's Printer. Archived from the original (PDF) on 18 June 2018.

=== 1974 ===
1974 Nova Scotia general election: Lunenburg East
Party	Candidate	Votes	%	±%
Progressive Conservative	Ron Barkhouse	2,536	53.04%	1.73%
Liberal	Joseph Saunders	1,963	41.06%	-7.63%
New Democratic	Anthony W. E. Zinck	282	5.90%	–
Total		4,781	–	
Source(s) Source: Nova Scotia Legislature (2024). "Electoral History for Lunenburg East" (PDF). nslegislature.ca. Nova Scotia, Chief Electoral Officer (1974). Returns of the General Election for the House of Assembly, Twenty-Eighth General Election (PDF) (Report). Queen's Printer. Archived from the original (PDF) on 18 June 2018.

=== 1970 ===
1970 Nova Scotia general election: Lunenburg East
Party	Candidate	Votes	%	±%
Progressive Conservative	Maurice L. Zinck	2,092	51.31%	-4.55%
Liberal	Eric Hagen	1,985	48.69%	4.55%
Total		4,077	–	
Source(s) Source: Nova Scotia Legislature (2024). "Electoral History for Lunenburg East" (PDF). nslegislature.ca. Nova Scotia, Legislative Assembly (1970). Returns of the General Election for the House of Assembly, 1970 (PDF) (Report). Queen's Printer. Archived from the original (PDF) on 25 July 2018.

=== 1967 ===
1967 Nova Scotia general election: Lunenburg East
Party	Candidate	Votes	%	±%
Progressive Conservative	Maurice L. Zinck	2,100	55.87%	-7.30%
Liberal	Fred Porter, Jr.	1,659	44.13%	7.30%
Total		3,759	–	
Source(s) Source: Nova Scotia Legislature (2024). "Electoral History for Lunenburg East" (PDF). nslegislature.ca. Nova Scotia Legislature (1967). Returns of the General Election for the House of Assembly (PDF) (Report). Queen's Printer. Archived from the original (PDF) on 25 July 2018.

=== 1963 ===
1963 Nova Scotia general election: Lunenburg East
Party	Candidate	Votes	%	±%
Progressive Conservative	Maurice L. Zinck	2,267	63.17%	4.79%
Liberal	Charles E. Harris	1,322	36.83%	-1.49%
Total		3,589	–	
Source(s) Source: Nova Scotia Legislature (2024). "Electoral History for Lunenburg East" (PDF). nslegislature.ca. Nova Scotia Legislature (1963). Returns of the General Election for the House of Assembly (PDF) (Report). Queen's Printer. Archived from the original (PDF) on 25 July 2018.

=== 1960 ===
1960 Nova Scotia general election: Lunenburg East
Party	Candidate	Votes	%	±%
Progressive Conservative	Maurice L. Zinck	2,140	58.37%	-1.43%
Liberal	Kirk S. Hennigar	1,405	38.33%	-1.87%
Co-operative Commonwealth	Albro Boehner	121	3.30%	–
Total		3,666	–	
Source(s) Source: Nova Scotia Legislature (2024). "Electoral History for Lunenburg East" (PDF). nslegislature.ca. Nova Scotia Legislature (1960). Returns of the General Election for the House of Assembly (PDF) (Report). Queen's Printer. Archived from the original (PDF) on 25 July 2018.

=== 1959 by-election ===
Nova Scotia provincial by-election, October 15, 1959: Lunenburg East
Party	Candidate	Votes	%	±%
Progressive Conservative	Maurice L. Zinck	2,186	59.81%	5.37%
Liberal	Kirk S. Hennigar	1,469	40.19%	-5.37%
Total		3,655	–	
Source(s) Source: Nova Scotia Legislature (2024). "Electoral History for Lunenburg East" (PDF). nslegislature.ca.

=== 1956 ===
1956 Nova Scotia general election: Lunenburg East
Party	Candidate	Votes	%	±%
Progressive Conservative	R. Clifford Levy	1,887	54.44%	–
Liberal	Kirk S. Hennigar	1,579	45.56%	–
Total		3,466	–	
Source(s) Source: Nova Scotia Legislature (2024). "Electoral History for Lunenburg East" (PDF). nslegislature.ca. Nova Scotia Legislature (1956). Returns of the General Election for the House of Assembly (PDF) (Report). Queen's Printer. Archived from the original (PDF) on 10 September 2018.

== See also ==
- List of Nova Scotia provincial electoral districts
- Canadian provincial electoral districts
