= Susan Corkum-Greek =

Canadian politician

The Honourable Susan Corkum-Greek ECNS MLA

Member of the Nova Scotia House of Assembly for Lunenburg
- Incumbent
- Assumed office August 17, 2021
- Preceded by: Suzanne Lohnes-Croft

Personal details
- Born: Susan Margaret Corkum-Greek
- Party: Progressive Conservative

Susan Margaret Corkum-Greek MLA is a Canadian politician who was elected to the Nova Scotia House of Assembly in the 2021 Nova Scotia general election. She represents the riding of Lunenburg as a member of the Progressive Conservative Association of Nova Scotia.

On August 31, 2021, Corkum-Greek was appointed Minister of Economic Development.

Prior to her election to the legislature, Corkum-Greek was a journalist and served as the general manager of the Lunenburg Academy of Music Performance.

== Electoral record ==
=== 2024 ===
2024 Nova Scotia general election: Lunenburg
Party	Candidate	Votes	%	±%
Progressive Conservative	Susan Corkum-Greek	4,308	60.16	+18.15
Liberal	Melissa Duggan	1,496	20.89	-13.66
New Democratic	Nick Jennery	1,185	16.55	-4.19
Green	Frank J. Fawson	172	2.40	+0.38
Total		7,161	–	
Total rejected / declined ballots		30	2	
Turnout		7,193	46.54	
Eligible voters		15,454		
Progressive Conservative hold		Swing		
Source: Elections Nova Scotia

=== 2021 ===
2021 Nova Scotia general election: Lunenburg
Party	Candidate	Votes	%	±%	Expenditures
Progressive Conservative	Susan Corkum-Greek	3,544	42.01	+11.10	$36,920.96
Liberal	Suzanne Lohnes-Croft	2,915	34.55	-4.93	$35,114.26
New Democratic	Alison Smith	1,750	20.74	-8.86	$50,982.90
Green	Thomas Trappenberg	171	2.03	+2.02	$200.00
Atlantica	John Giannakos	57	0.67	–	$200.00
Total valid votes/expense limit		8,437	–	–	$85,187.43
Total rejected ballots		26	0.31		
Turnout		8,463	58.14		
Eligible voters		14,555			
Progressive Conservative gain from Liberal		Swing		+8.02	
Source: Elections Nova Scotia
