= Maxine Cochran =

Canadian politician

The Honourable Maxine Cochran ECNS

Member of the Legislative Assembly of Nova Scotia
- In office June 5, 1984 – September 6, 1988
- Preceded by: Bruce Cochran
- Succeeded by: Al Mosher
- Constituency: Lunenburg Centre

Personal details
- Born: August 5, 1926 Lawrencetown, Annapolis County, Nova Scotia
- Died: July 8, 2014 (aged 87) Halifax, Nova Scotia
- Party: Progressive Conservative
- Spouse: Bruce Cochran
- Occupation: broadcaster, teacher, health care, community volunteer, politician

Maxine Cochran (August 5, 1926 – July 8, 2014) was a Canadian politician. She represented the electoral district of Lunenburg Centre in the Nova Scotia House of Assembly from 1984 to 1988. She is best known as the first female cabinet minister in Nova Scotia when she was appointed the Minister of Transportation on November 26, 1985.

== Political career ==
Cochran was first elected in Lunenburg Centre in a byelection in 1984 after the death of her husband, Bruce, who previously held the seat. She was then re-elected a few months later in a general election and went on to hold a number of portfolios.
