= Denise Peterson-Rafuse =

Canadian politician

The Honourable Denise Peterson-Rafuse ECNS

Member of the Nova Scotia House of Assembly for Chester-St. Margaret's
- In office June 9, 2009 – May 30, 2017
- Preceded by: Judy Streatch
- Succeeded by: Hugh MacKay

Minister of Community Services
- In office June 19, 2009 – October 22, 2013
- Preceded by: Chris d'Entremont
- Succeeded by: Joanne Bernard

Minister for Seniors
- In office June 19, 2009 – October 22, 2013
- Preceded by: Len Goucher
- Succeeded by: Leo Glavine

Personal details
- Party: New Democrat

Denise J. Peterson-Rafuse is a Canadian politician, who represented the electoral district of Chester-St. Margaret's in the Nova Scotia House of Assembly from 2009 to 2017 as a member of the Nova Scotia New Democratic Party.

== Early life and education ==
Peterson-Rafuse earned a Bachelor of Public Relations from Mount Saint Vincent University in 1986. She worked for the Canadian Cancer Society and the Heart and Stroke Foundation.

== Political career ==
In 2009, Peterson-Rafuse successfully ran for the New Democratic Party nomination in the riding of Chester-St. Margaret's. She was elected in the 2009 provincial election and was re-elected in the 2013 provincial election.

On June 19, 2009, Peterson-Rafuse was appointed to the Executive Council of Nova Scotia as Minister of Community Services, Minister responsible for Seniors and the Advisory Council on the Status of Women, and chair of the Senior Citizens' Secretariat.

In March 2016, Peterson-Rafuse was diagnosed with multiple sclerosis. On April 6, 2016, Peterson-Rafuse announced that she would be taking a leave of absence to deal with her diagnosis.

In the 2017 election, Peterson-Rafuse was defeated by Liberal Hugh MacKay.

For the 2021 election, Peterson-Rafuse endorsed the Progressive Conservatives for their proposed health care plan, citing her prior diagnosis of multiple sclerosis and the difficulties in finding adequate support.

== Electoral record ==
2017 Nova Scotia general election
Party	Candidate	Votes	%	±%
Liberal	Hugh MacKay	3,112	35.46	+4.40
New Democratic	Denise Peterson-Rafuse	3,021	34.42	-0.82
Progressive Conservative	Julie Chaisson	2,230	25.41	-8.29
Green	Harry Ward	413	4.71	N/A

2013 Nova Scotia general election
Party	Candidate	Votes	%	±%
New Democratic Party	Denise Peterson-Rafuse	3341	35.25	
Progressive Conservative	Janet Elizabeth Irwin	3193	33.69	
Liberal	Timothy Whitman Harris	2943	31.06	

2009 Nova Scotia general election
Party	Candidate	Votes	%	±%
New Democratic Party	Denise Peterson-Rafuse	4835	48.09	
Progressive Conservative	Judy Streatch	2762	27.47	
Liberal	Jo-Ann Grant	2122	21.11	
Green	Ryan Cameron	335	3.33	–
