= Henry March =

Canadian politician

Henry A. March

MLA for Lunenburg County
- In office 1906–1909

Personal details
- Born: December 14, 1862 Bridgewater, Nova Scotia
- Died: June 20, 1917 (aged 53) Lunenburg, Nova Scotia
- Party: Liberal Party of Nova Scotia
- Education: University of Michigan
- Profession: doctor

Henry Arthur March (December 14, 1862 – June 20, 1917) was a physician and political figure in Nova Scotia, Canada. He represented Lunenburg County in the Nova Scotia House of Assembly from 1906 to 1909 as a Liberal member.

== Early life and education ==
He was born in Bridgewater, Nova Scotia, the son of Stephen March, born in Dorsetshire, England, and Elizabeth Keating. March was educated at Acadia College and the medical school of the University of Michigan.

== Career ==
He practiced for a short time in Ann Arbor, Michigan before returning to Bridgewater, where he served the community as a physician for 25 years. In 1887, he married Dotte B. Cook. In 1913, he moved to Lockeport. March was coroner for Lunenburg County and surgeon for the county asylum; he was also health officer for Bridgeport. He served as president of the provincial medical society in 1904 and 1905 and was vice-president of the British Medical Society in 1906. He was elected to the Nova Scotia House of Assembly in 1906 and served until his resignation in 1909.

== Death ==
He died on June 20, 1917, in Lunenburg.
