= Harley J. Spence =

Canadian politician

MLA for Lunenburg West
- In office 1956–1970
- Preceded by: new riding
- Succeeded by: Maurice DeLorey

MLA for Lunenburg County
- In office 1953–1956
- Preceded by: Gordon E. Romkey; Arthur L. Thurlow
- Succeeded by: riding dissolved

Personal details
- Born: November 27, 1904 Ellershouse, Nova Scotia
- Died: April 27, 1993 (aged 88) Bradenton, Florida, U.S.
- Party: Progressive Conservative
- Occupation: businessman

Harley James Spence (November 27, 1904 – April 27, 1993) was a Canadian politician. He represented the electoral districts of Lunenburg County and Lunenburg West in the Nova Scotia House of Assembly from 1953 to 1970. He was a member of the Progressive Conservative Party of Nova Scotia.

Born in 1904 at Ellershouse, Hants County, Nova Scotia, Spence was a businessman by career. He married Ella Peach Riley in 1929. He served as a municipal councillor for West Hants from 1932 to 1942. Spence entered provincial politics in 1953 when he was elected in the dual-member Lunenburg County riding with R. Clifford Levy. In the 1956 election, Spence was re-elected by 67 votes in the newly established Lunenburg West riding. He was re-elected in the 1960, 1963, and 1967 elections. Spence did not reoffer in the 1970 election. Spence died in 1993 in Bradenton, Florida.
