= John Chataway =

Canadian politician

John E. Chataway

MLA for Chester-St. Margaret's
- In office 27 July 1999 – 31 December 2004
- Preceded by: Hinrich Bitter-Suermann
- Succeeded by: Judy Streatch

Personal details
- Born: 3 March 1947
- Died: 31 December 2004 (aged 57) Toronto, Ontario, Canada
- Party: Progressive Conservative

John Edward Chataway (3 March 1947 – 31 December 2004) was a Canadian politician and Progressive Conservative Member of the Nova Scotia Legislative Assembly for Chester-St. Margaret's from July 1999 until his death, and a cabinet minister.

== Early life and education ==
Chataway was a graduate of Waterloo Lutheran University (now Wilfrid Laurier University). He taught school in Nova Scotia and was a long-time municipal councillor.

== Political career ==
After his election as MLA in 1999, Chataway was named Minister of Housing and Municipal Affairs, and Minister of Human Resources. Some of his constituents in Chester alleged he was a slum landlord, a charge he denied. Chataway sold his interests in the properties to take away any appearance or hint of a conflict of interest, but resigned the Housing and Municipal Affairs portfolio on 23 September, after meeting with Premier John Hamm, where both agreed that his ability to carry out his duties, specifically in that portfolio, has been eroded. He retained the Human Resources portfolio and added the Environment portfolio in a December 1999 cabinet shuffle.

== Death ==
His health had been in decline since a brain aneurysm in February 2000. He resigned from cabinet for health reasons in January 2001, but stayed on as MLA. He suffered a stroke while visiting his sister, Joan, in Toronto in December 2004, and died a few days later.

== Personal life ==
He was a descendant of the Chataway who surveyed the Manitoba–Ontario border, distant cousin of Christopher Chataway, and a great admirer of Winston Churchill. He attended high school in Lindsay, Ontario, and was treasurer of the student council. His twin brother, Rick, was vice-president. Inspired by his cousin, Chris, he was a very good distance runner. Chataway was very active in historical preservation efforts in the Chester area. He was an excellent amateur auctioneer, much in demand for charity fundraisers.
