= Edward Doran Davison =

Canadian politician

Edward Doran Davison (June 10, 1819 – February 21, 1894) was a lumber merchant and political figure in Nova Scotia. He represented Queen's County in the Nova Scotia House of Assembly from 1855 to 1859.

He was born in Queens County, Nova Scotia, the son of Samuel Davison and Eleanor Doran. His parents both died while he was still young. Davison inherited property including a farm, fishing rights and a sawmill from his mother's family. He married Desiah Mack in 1839. Davison was defeated when he ran for reelection in 1859. He expanded his lumber operations and his company had become the largest lumber business in the province by the 1880s. In 1887, he married Martha Hopkins Campbell after the death of his first wife. Davison died in Bridgewater at the age of 74.

His son Charles Henry and Edward Doran also served in the provincial assembly.
