= Michael Baker (politician) =

Canadian politician

The Honourable Michael Baker ONS QC

Member of the Nova Scotia House of Assembly for Lunenburg
- In office March 24, 1998 – March 2, 2009
- Preceded by: Lila O'Connor
- Succeeded by: Pam Birdsall

Minister of Finance
- In office February 23, 2006 – February 22, 2009
- Premier: Rodney MacDonald
- Preceded by: Peter G. Christie
- Succeeded by: Chris d'Entremont

Minister of Justice and Attorney General of Nova Scotia
- In office August 16, 1999 – December 19, 2002
- Premier: John Hamm
- Preceded by: Robbie Harrison
- Succeeded by: Murray Scott

Minister of Justice and Attorney General of Nova Scotia
- In office August 18, 2003 – February 24, 2006
- Premier: John Hamm
- Preceded by: Jamie Muir
- Succeeded by: Murray Scott

Personal details
- Born: January 28, 1957 Lunenburg, Nova Scotia
- Died: March 2, 2009 (aged 52) Lunenburg, Nova Scotia
- Party: Progressive Conservative
- Occupation: Lawyer

Michael Gilbert Baker ONS QC (January 28, 1957 – March 2, 2009) was a Canadian politician. He represented the electoral district of Lunenburg in the Nova Scotia House of Assembly between 1998 and 2009. He was a Progressive Conservative.

== Early life and career ==
Born in 1957 at Lunenburg, Nova Scotia, Baker was a graduate of Dalhousie Law School. He practiced law at Hennigar, Wells, Lamey & Baker in Mahone Bay and Chester and as a solicitor for the Town of Mahone Bay. He was past president of Lunenburg County Barristers Association, member of Nova Scotia Barristers Society Council, and Director of Marine Atlantic. Baker was appointed Queen's Counsel in 1999.

== Political career ==
Baker entered provincial politics in 1998, defeating Liberal incumbent Lila O'Connor by 132 votes in the Lunenburg riding. In the 1999 election, Baker was re-elected, defeating O'Connor by over 2200 votes. In August 1999, Baker was appointed to the Executive Council of Nova Scotia as Minister of Justice and Attorney General. In December 2001, Baker was given an additional role in cabinet as Chair of Treasury and Policy Board. In a December 2002 cabinet shuffle, Baker was moved to Minister of Transportation and Public Works. He was re-elected in the 2003 election, and was re-appointed as Minister of Justice and Attorney General, retained Chair of Treasury and Policy Board, and given a new role as Minister of Aboriginal Affairs in a post-election cabinet shuffle.

When Rodney MacDonald took over as premier in February 2006, Baker was named Minister of Finance, and Minister of Aboriginal Affairs. In May 2006, Baker underwent surgery to remove a cancerous tumor, but still ran for re-election in June 2006, winning his seat by 1300 votes. Following the election, Baker retained his cabinet positions, and continued to serve despite facing more serious health issues. As of January 2009, Baker was still planning on reoffering in the next election, but his condition worsened and he stepped down from cabinet in February. Baker died of cancer on March 2, 2009, at his home in Lunenburg. He was 52.

In 2009, he was a posthumous recipient of the Order of Nova Scotia.
