= Pam Birdsall =

Canadian politician

MLA for Lunenburg
- In office June 9, 2009 – October 8, 2013
- Preceded by: Michael Baker
- Succeeded by: Suzanne Lohnes-Croft

Personal details
- Party: New Democrat
- Occupation: Entrepreneur

Pam Birdsall is a Canadian politician. Birdsall was elected to the Nova Scotia House of Assembly in the 2009 provincial election. She represented the electoral district of Lunenburg as a member of the New Democratic Party until her defeat in the 2013 election.
