= Al Mosher =

Canadian politician

MLA for Lunenburg Centre
- In office 1988–1993
- Preceded by: Maxine Cochran
- Succeeded by: riding dissolved

Personal details
- Born: 1948 (age 77–78)
- Party: Progressive Conservative
- Occupation: Broadcaster

Allan Marshall Mosher is a Canadian politician. He represented the electoral district of Lunenburg Centre in the Nova Scotia House of Assembly from 1988 to 1993. He was a member of the Progressive Conservative Party of Nova Scotia.

A broadcaster by career, Mosher entered provincial politics in the 1988 election, winning the Lunenburg Centre riding. In the 1993 election, Mosher ran in the new riding of Lunenburg, but was defeated by Liberal Lila O'Connor.
