= DesBrisay Museum =

Coordinates: 44.368°N 64.512°W

- Location: 130 Jubilee Road; Bridgewater, Nova Scotia, Canada
- Type: Municipal museum
- Website: www.desbrisaymuseum.ca

The DesBrisay Museum is a museum showcasing the history of the town of Bridgewater, Nova Scotia and the surrounding area, including its inhabitants and architecture, whose collection is due to the efforts of Judge Mather Byles DesBrisay. Upon his death, DesBrisay left his collection to the town and in 1967, the museum was established.

The museum is funded, in part, by the Province of Nova Scotia as well as by the town of Bridgewater and a number of different fundraising initiatives. In 2017, a Nova Scotia Community Museum Assistance Program evaluation declared the DesBrisay the top community museum in the province, out of a roster of 67.

== Affiliations ==
The Museum is affiliated with: CMA, CHIN, and Virtual Museum of Canada.

== See also ==
- List of museums in Nova Scotia
