= Edward James (Nova Scotia politician) =

Canadian politician

Edward James (November 26, 1825 – October 15, 1909) was a millwright and political figure in Nova Scotia, Canada. He represented Lunenburg County in the Nova Scotia House of Assembly from 1878 to 1882 as a Liberal-Conservative member.

== Early life ==
He was born and educated in Lunenburg, Nova Scotia, the son of Arthur James and Mary Ann Ernst. James served as captain in the local militia. He lived at Mahone Bay. James ran unsuccessfully for a seat in the provincial assembly in 1874.

== Death ==
He died in Lunenburg at the age of 83.

== Personal life ==
His grandfather, also named Edward James, also served as a member of the legislative assembly. In 1853, he married Eliza Lantz.
