= Bruce Cochran =

Canadian politician

MLA for Lunenburg Centre
- In office 1974 – January 24, 1984
- Preceded by: Walton Cook
- Succeeded by: Maxine Cochran

Personal details
- Born: 1 December 1919 Mahone Bay, Nova Scotia
- Died: 24 January 1984 (aged 64) Rye, New York, U.S.
- Party: Progressive Conservative
- Occupation: Public relations consultant

Bruce Cochran (1 December 1919 – 24 January 1984) was a Canadian businessman, publisher, and politician. He represented the electoral district of Lunenburg Centre in the Nova Scotia House of Assembly from 1974 to 1983. He was a member of the Progressive Conservative Party of Nova Scotia.

== Early life and education ==
Born in Mahone Bay, Nova Scotia, Cochran studied at the University of King's College, and graduated from Dalhousie University with a Bachelor's degree in Commerce (B.Com.).

== Career ==
Cochran served the Canadian military as a member of the West Nova Scotia Regiment throughout the duration of World War II (1939–1945) rising to the rank of captain. He married Maxine Elizabeth Bishop in 1951. They had one son, Andrew Bruce Bishop Cochran, born in 1952.

In 1960, he founded his own public relations consulting company, Bruce Cochran Associates. and later became publisher of The Dartmouth Free Press. Cochran entered provincial politics in the 1974 election, defeating Liberal James Kinley by 208 votes in Lunenburg Centre. He was re-elected in the 1978, and 1981 elections.

On 5 October 1978, Cochran was appointed to the Executive Council of Nova Scotia as Minister of Consumer Affairs, Minister responsible for Housing (1978), and Minister responsible for Communications and Information (1978). In June 1979, he was appointed Minister of Tourism and served in that position for the rest of time in public office. He also was briefly Minister of Culture, Recreation and Fitness (1979).

== Death ==
In November 1983, Cochran resigned from his government duties, citing health reasons, and died in the United States (Rye, NY) in January 1984. His wife, Maxine Cochran succeeded him as MLA and went on to become Nova Scotia's first female cabinet minister.
