= Alfred Clairmonte Zwicker =

Canadian politician from Nova Scotia (1864–1949)

Member of the Nova Scotia House of Assembly for Lunenburg
- In office June 14, 1911 – June 20, 1916

Personal details
- Born: December 9, 1864 Mahone Bay, Nova Scotia
- Died: October 20, 1949 (aged 84) Mahone Bay, Nova Scotia
- Party: Liberal Conservative
- Relations: Benjamin Zwicker (grandfather); Peter Spearwater (grandfather)
- Occupation: lumberman, real estate broker, politician

Alfred Clairmonte Zwicker (December 9, 1864 – October 20, 1949) was a lumberman, real estate broker, and political figure in Nova Scotia, Canada. He represented Lunenburg in the Nova Scotia House of Assembly from 1911 to 1916 as a Liberal Conservative member.

Zwicker was born in 1864 at Mahone Bay, Nova Scotia to Alfred Frederick Zwicker and Louisa Spearwater, and was a grandson of former House members Benjamin Zwicker and Peter Spearwater. He served as a municipal councillor from 1896 to 1916 and as mayor of Mahone Bay. Zwicker died in 1949 at Mahone Bay.

Zwicker was unsuccessful in the 1911 Nova Scotia general election, but elected in a June 14, 1911, by-election when Alexander Kenneth MacLean resigned to contest the 1911 Canadian federal election. He was unsuccessful in the 1916 Nova Scotia general election.
