= Charles Uniacke Mader =

Canadian politician

Member of the Nova Scotia House of Assembly for Lunenburg County
- In office 1904–1911
- Preceded by: Alexander Kenneth Maclean, John Drew Sperry
- Succeeded by: Alexander Kenneth Maclean, Joseph Willis Margeson

Personal details
- Born: April 10, 1856 Mader's Cove, Nova Scotia
- Died: April 27, 1929 (aged 73) Mahone Bay, Nova Scotia
- Party: Liberal

Charles Uniacke Mader (April 10, 1856 – May 27, 1929) was a merchant and political figure in Nova Scotia, Canada. He represented Lunenburg County in the Nova Scotia House of Assembly as a Liberal member from 1904 to 1911.

== Early life ==
He was born in Maders Cove, Lunenburg County, Nova Scotia, the son of Francis Mader, of German descent, and Mary Andrews.

== Career ==
He first worked as a clerk in a general store and then went into business on his own in Mahone Bay in 1880. Mader built a general store in Mahone Bay in 1887 and also operated a fishing fleet. He served as a member of the local school board.

== Death ==
He died in Mahone Bay on May 27, 1929.

== Personal life ==
He married Martha Ernst in 1880. In 1884, he married Charlotte A. Keddy after the death of his first wife.
