= West Dublin, Nova Scotia =

Community in Nova Scotia, Canada

Coordinates: 44°15′14.59″N 64°23′56.79″W

West Dublin in Nova Scotia

West Dublin is a community in the Canadian province of Nova Scotia, located in the Lunenburg Municipal District in Lunenburg County.
