= Jim Barkhouse =

Canadian politician

The Honourable Jim Barkhouse ECNS

MLA for Chester-St. Margaret's
- In office 1993–1998
- Preceded by: new riding
- Succeeded by: Hinrich Bitter-Suermann

MLA for Lunenburg East
- In office 1984–1993
- Preceded by: Ron Barkhouse
- Succeeded by: riding dissolved

Personal details
- Born: May 3, 1940 (age 85) Chester, Nova Scotia
- Party: Liberal

James Alfred Barkhouse (born May 3, 1940) is a former hardware store owner and political figure in Nova Scotia, Canada. He represented Lunenburg East and then Chester-St. Margaret's in the Nova Scotia House of Assembly from 1984 to 1998 as a Liberal member.

== Early life and education ==
He was born in Chester, Nova Scotia and studied at Acadia University.

== Before politics ==
Barkhouse served in the Royal Canadian Air Force from 1958 to 1963 and worked at Sperry Gyroscope and Hermes Electronics. He was owner and manager of Reddens Hardware from 1971 to 1987.

== Political career ==
Barkhouse entered provincial politics in the 1984 election, winning the Lunenburg East seat. He was re-elected in the 1988 election. In the 1993 election, Barkhouse was re-elected in the new riding of Chester-St. Margaret's. On June 11, 1993, he was appointed to the Executive Council of Nova Scotia as Minister of Fisheries. He retained the portfolio when Russell MacLellan took over as premier in July 1997. Barkhouse was defeated when he ran for re-election in 1998.
