= Maurice L. Zinck =

Canadian politician

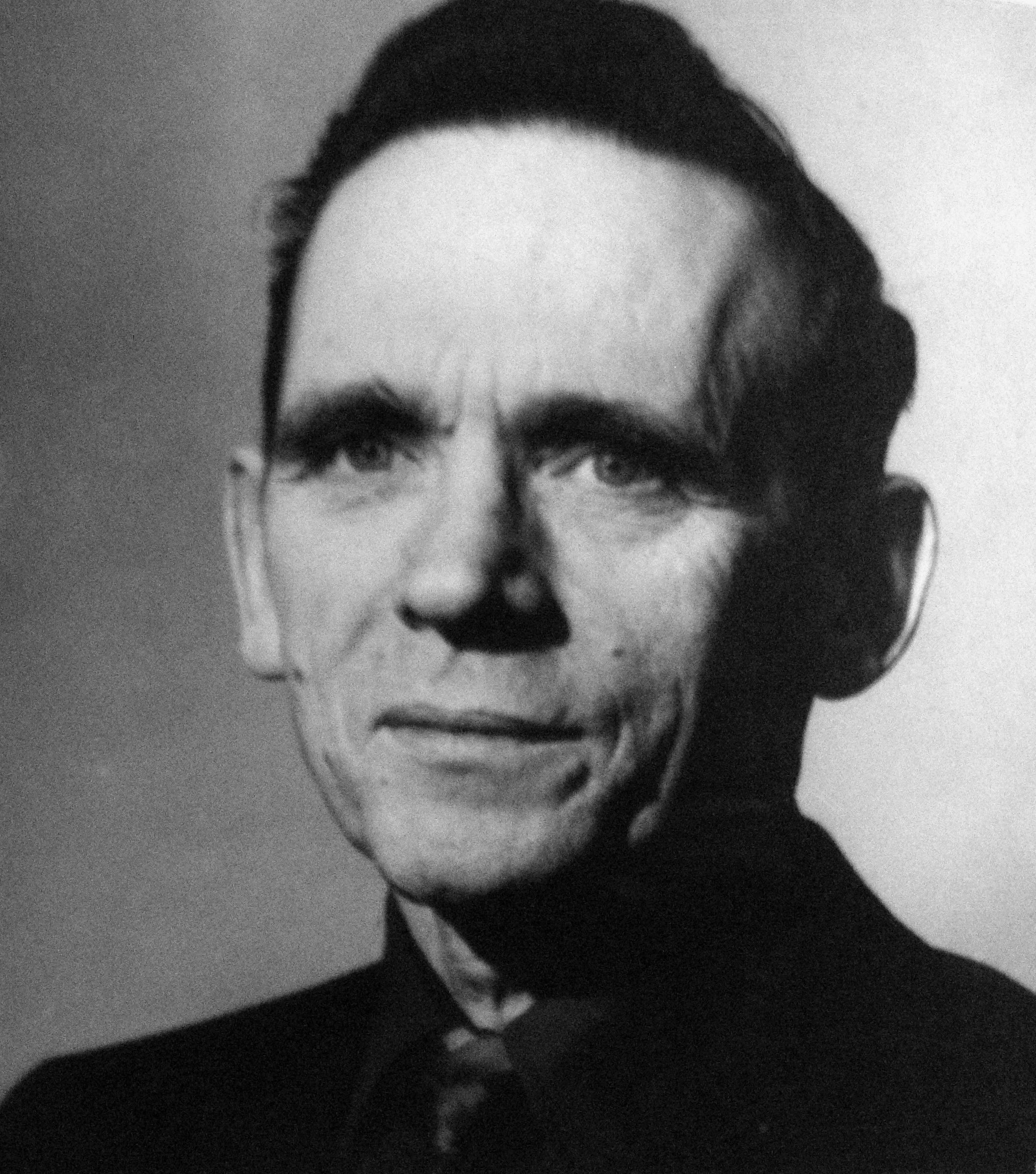

MLA for Lunenburg East
- In office 1959–1974
- Preceded by: R. Clifford Levy
- Succeeded by: Ron Barkhouse

Personal details
- Born: December 30, 1911 Chester, Nova Scotia
- Died: 1988 (aged 76–77) Nova Scotia
- Party: Progressive Conservative
- Occupation: merchant

Maurice Louis Zinck (December 30, 1911 – 1988) was a Canadian politician. He represented the electoral district of Lunenburg East in the Nova Scotia House of Assembly from 1959 to 1974. He is a member of the Nova Scotia Progressive Conservative Party.

Zinck was born in Chester, Nova Scotia. He was a hardware merchant. In 1939, he married Annie Stanford Evans.
