= Ron Barkhouse =

Canadian politician

The Honourable Ron Barkhouse ECNS

MLA for Lunenburg East
- In office 1974–1984
- Preceded by: Maurice L. Zinck
- Succeeded by: Jim Barkhouse

Personal details
- Born: April 22, 1926 New Ross, Nova Scotia
- Died: April 7, 2014 (aged 87) Halifax, Nova Scotia
- Party: Progressive Conservative
- Occupation: businessman

Ronald Theodore Barkhouse (April 22, 1926 – April 7, 2014) was a merchant and politician in Nova Scotia, Canada. He represented Lunenburg East in the Nova Scotia House of Assembly from 1974 to 1984 as a Progressive Conservative member.

== Early life and education ==
He was born in New Ross, Nova Scotia, the son of Alfred S. Barkhouse and Anne Bertha Meister, and was educated at the Horton Academy.

== Career ==
Barkhouse operated a wholesale lumber business and a general store. In 1951, he married Eleanor Plunket Grant. Barkhouse was a member of the municipal council for Chester from 1952 to 1967 and also served on the local school board. He served in the province's Executive Council as Minister of Mines and Energy. Barkhouse was also a commissioner for the Supreme Court of Nova Scotia.

== History ==
Barkhouse co-authored a genealogy book entitled 100 Day Voyage to Freedom containing Barkhouse family lineage from the original Berghaus immigrant couple to Nova Scotia. The book's facts are contained in a genealogy website named for Barkhouse.

He authored a stream of consciousness style manuscript entitled The Olden Days and the Olden Ways in 2003, about the way life used to be in the New Ross area.

According to his obituary, he "was the Chairman of the New Ross Centennial Committee, formed to officially commemorate Canada's 100th anniversary. The committee went on to promote a project for 150th anniversary of the founding of New Ross, culminating in the opening of Ross Farm Museum in 1970."

== Death ==
Barkhouse died in Halifax on April 7, 2014, at the age of 87.
