= Judy Streatch =

Canadian politician

The Honourable Judy Streatch ECNS

Member of the Nova Scotia House of Assembly for Chester-St. Margaret's
- In office June 12, 2005 – June 9, 2009
- Preceded by: John Chataway
- Succeeded by: Denise Peterson-Rafuse

Personal details
- Born: October 6, 1966 (age 59)
- Party: Progressive Conservative
- Spouse: Gerald Keddy
- Parent(s): Ken Streatch; Barbara Blackburn
- Relatives: Steve Streatch (brother)

Judy Streatch (born October 6, 1966) is a Canadian politician, who was a Member of the Legislative Assembly (MLA) for Chester-St. Margaret's in Nova Scotia from 2005 to 2009.

A schoolteacher by career, Streatch was educated at Saint Mary's University, the Nova Scotia Teachers College, and the Université du Québec à Trois-Rivières. Streatch was first elected in a by-election held on June 21, 2005, for the seat vacated by the late John Chataway upon his death. She was subsequently re-elected in the June 2006 provincial election.

Streatch served as co-chair of the 2006 Leadership Convention. Upon the election of Rodney MacDonald as Premier of Nova Scotia, Streatch was elevated to the position of Minister of Tourism, Culture and Heritage. In June 2006, Streatch was moved to Minister of Community Services in a post-election cabinet shuffle. In October 2007, Streatch was given an additional role in cabinet as Minister of Communications Nova Scotia. On January 7, 2009, she was named the Minister of Education, while retaining her role as Minister of Communications Nova Scotia. Streatch was defeated when she ran for re-election in 2009.

Streatch is the daughter of long-time MLA and former cabinet minister Ken Streatch. Her brother Steve served as a councillor with the Halifax Regional Municipality. Her husband is former South Shore—St. Margaret's Member of Parliament Gerald Keddy.
