= R. Clifford Levy =

Canadian politician

MLA for Lunenburg East
- In office 1956–1959
- Preceded by: new riding
- Succeeded by: Maurice L. Zinck

MLA for Lunenburg County
- In office 1953–1956
- Preceded by: Gordon E. Romkey; Arthur L. Thurlow
- Succeeded by: riding dissolved

Personal details
- Born: October 19, 1905 Sherwood, Nova Scotia
- Died: March 4, 1971 (aged 65) Bridgewater, Nova Scotia
- Party: Progressive Conservative
- Occupation: lawyer

Robert Clifford Levy (October 19, 1905 – March 4, 1971) was a Canadian politician. He represented the electoral districts of Lunenburg County and Lunenburg East in the Nova Scotia House of Assembly from 1953 to 1959. He was a member of the Progressive Conservative Party of Nova Scotia.

== Early life ==
Born in 1905 at Sherwood, Lunenburg County, Nova Scotia, Levy was educated at Dalhousie University, and Acadia University.

== Career ==
Levy served as a town councillor and deputy mayor in Bridgewater, Nova Scotia from 1951 to 1952, and also served as president of the Nova Scotia Union of Municipalities. His son Bob Levy served as a New Democratic Party MLA in the 1980s.

Levy ran as a Progressive Conservative candidate for the Lunenburg County riding in the 1941, 1945, and 1949 elections, but was defeated in all three attempts at entering provincial politics. He ran again in the 1953 election, and won a seat for the dual-member Lunenburg riding with Progressive Conservative Harley J. Spence. In the 1956 election, Levy was re-elected by 308 votes in the newly established Lunenburg East riding. On November 20, 1956, Levy was appointed to the Executive Council of Nova Scotia as Minister of Municipal Affairs, and Minister of Lands and Forests. Levy resigned his seat on July 24, 1959, and was appointed a County Court judge.

== Death ==
Levy died at Bridgewater on March 4, 1971.

== Personal life ==
He married Thora McClair Freeman in 1931.
