= Johnes =

Johnes is a surname. Notable people with the surname include:

- Alexandra Johnes (born 1976), American film producer
- Arthur James Johnes (1809–1871), English judge
- Thomas Johnes (1748–1816), British politician
- Geraint Johnes, English economist

== See also ==
- James Hills-Johnes (1833–1919), British soldier
- Jones (surname)
