= John Drew Sperry =

Canadian politician

John Drew Sperry (February 10, 1851 – October 7, 1933) was a merchant and political figure in Nova Scotia, Canada. He represented Lunenburg County in the Nova Scotia House of Assembly from 1889 to 1896, from 1897 to 1901 and from 1902 to 1906. Sperry represented Lunenburg in the House of Commons of Canada from 1909 to 1911 as a Liberal member.

== Early life and education ==
He was born in Petite Rivière, Nova Scotia, the son of John Charles Sperry and Mary Ann Drew, and was educated at the Sackville Academy.

== Career ==
He served 12 years on the Lunenburg County council, also serving as county warden. Sperry was first elected to the provincial assembly in an 1889 by-election held after the death of George A. Ross. He resigned his seat in 1896 to run unsuccessfully for a federal seat. He was first elected to the House of Commons in a 1909 by-election held after Alexander Kenneth Maclean resigned his seat to serve in the provincial assembly; Sperry was defeated when he ran for reelection in 1911.

== Death ==
He died in Petite Rivière at the age of 82.

== Personal life ==
Sperry married Maria Dauphinee. His son Aubrey also served in the provincial assembly.

== Electoral record ==
By-election on 22 December 1909 On Mr. McLean's resignation, 23 October 1909
Party	Candidate	Votes
Liberal	John Drew Sperry	3,371
Conservative	Carmon Smith Marshall	3,104

1911 Canadian federal election: Lunenburg
Party	Candidate	Votes
Conservative	Dugald Stewart	3,645
Liberal	John Drew Sperry	3,237
