= Cherry Hill, Nova Scotia =

Community in Nova Scotia, Canada

Coordinates: 44°8′59.79″N 64°29′55.22″W

Cherry Hill in Nova Scotia

Cherry Hill is a community in the Canadian province of Nova Scotia, located in the Lunenburg Municipal District in Lunenburg County.
