= Suzanne Lohnes-Croft =

Canadian politician

The Honourable Suzanne Lohnes-Croft ECNS
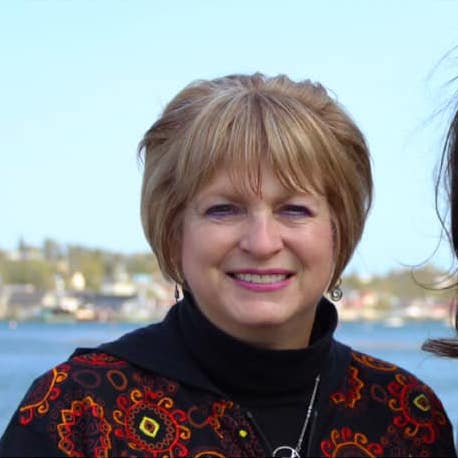

Member of the Nova Scotia House of Assembly for Lunenburg
- In office October 8, 2013 – July 17, 2021
- Preceded by: Pam Birdsall
- Succeeded by: Susan Corkum-Greek

Personal details
- Party: Liberal
- Occupation: Early childhood educator

Suzanne Lohnes-Croft is a Canadian politician, who was elected to the Nova Scotia House of Assembly in the 2013 provincial election and was re-elected in 2017. A member of the Nova Scotia Liberal Party, she represented the electoral district of Lunenburg until her defeat in the 2021 Nova Scotia general election.

== Early life and education ==
Lohnes-Croft attended the Mahone Bay Consolidated school graduating in 1977. She continued her education at the Mount Saint Vincent University studying Early Childhood education and child development. Before being elected, Lohnes-Croft worked at a daycare as an early childhood educator.

== Political career ==
In the 2013 election, Lohnes-Croft captured nearly 37 percent of the vote in the riding of Lunenburg. In the 2017 election, Lohnes-Croft captured nearly 40 percent of the vote in the riding of Lunenburg. From 2013 to 2020, Lohnes-Croft served as Deputy Speaker, before becoming Minister of Communities, Culture and Heritage and Gaelic Affairs. Responsible for the Heritage Property Act and the Voluntary Sector. Lohnes-Croft also is a member of the Standing Committee on Assembly Matters examines the rules, procedures, practices, organization and facilities of the House of Assembly.

As Minister of Communities, Culture and Heritage Lohnes-Croft supported funding for water-related infrastructure projects, through the provincial capital assistance program. Which included the pre-design work for the Salt Marsh project, waterline removal and cleanup of Lepper Brook in Colchester. A study to recommend climate change adaptation measures in Wolfville. A study option to protect Lunenberg's Petite Riviere Watershed from flooding. To assess the condition of a dam on Rory's Brook in Inverness install tide and weather gauges in Bear River, Weymouth, East Ferry, Freeport and Digby. To reconstruct a dangerous area of shoreline on South Street in Lockport.

As Minister Lohnes-Croft supported funding a scholarship honouring internationally acclaimed singer Portia White, honouring her important legacy celebrating her artistry and for ground-breaking achievements in Nova Scotian as a classical singer.

As Minister Lohnes-Croft, provided funds through the province's Emergency Support Program for Arts and Culture. which will help the art community stay afloat while Nova Scotians deal with Convid-19 restrictions. The one-time grant totalling $2.1-million will help make the recovery easier in the future.

== Bill introduced of Royal Assent ==
- Presbyterian Church Legislation, An Act Respecting the Repeal of - Bill 137
- Lunenburg Common Lands (2017) Act - Bill 36

== Electoral record ==
2017 Nova Scotia general election
Party	Candidate	Votes	%	±%
Liberal	Suzanne Lohnes-Croft	3,110		
Progressive Conservative	Brian Pickings	2,425		
New Democratic Party	Marc Breaugh	2,348		

2013 Nova Scotia general election
Party	Candidate	Votes	%	±%
Liberal	Suzanne Lohnes-Croft	3,182	37.81	
New Democratic Party	Pam Birdsall	2,768	32.89	
Progressive Conservative	Brian Pickings	2,465	29.29	
