= William Haslam Smith =

Canadian politician

William Haslam Smith (October 12, 1891 – August 15, 1958) was a Canadian businessman and political figure in Nova Scotia. He represented Lunenburg County in the Nova Scotia House of Assembly from 1925 to 1928 as a Liberal-Conservative member.

== Early life and education ==
He was born in Lunenburg, Nova Scotia, the son of William Charles Smith, and was educated in Luneburg, Halifax and Belleville, Ontario.

== Career ==
Smith was vice-president of Lunenburg Sea Products, which operated a fish processing plant. He lived in Lunenburg but later moved to North Vancouver.

== Personal life ==
In 1921, Smith married Mary Gwendolyn Pugsley.
