= George A. Ross =

Canadian politician

George Angus Ross (1854 – June 29, 1888) was a lawyer and political figure in Nova Scotia, Canada. He represented Lunenburg County in the Nova Scotia House of Assembly from 1882 to 1889 as a Liberal member.

== Early life and education ==
He was born in Lunenburg, Nova Scotia, the son of William Ross, a Scottish immigrant, and was educated at the Academy there. Ross was called to the bar in 1875.

== Career ==
He served as a captain in the militia. As a Nova Scotia Liberal, he supported the repeal of Confederation. Ross died in office.

== Essay on evolution ==
In 1874 Ross published an essay discussing the evidence in favour of the evolution of species and arguing for the compatibility of Christianity with the natural science of evolution.
