= Aubrey Sperry =

Canadian politician

Aubrey Herbert Sperry (June 29, 1878 – March 24, 1942) was a merchant and political figure in Nova Scotia, Canada. He represented Lunenburg County in the Nova Scotia House of Assembly from 1920 to 1925 as a Liberal member.

== Early life and education ==
He was born in Petite-Rivière, Nova Scotia, the son of John Drew Sperry and Maria Louisa Dauphinee and was educated at Mount Allison Academy.

== Career ==
He was clerk and treasurer for Lunenburg.

== Death ==
He died in Halifax at the age of 68.

== Personal life ==
Sperry was married twice: to Mary P. Coffin in 1903 and then to Margaret H Pickels.
