= Charles Henry Davison =

Canadian politician

Charles Henry Davison (July 25, 1840 – August 26, 1896) was a merchant and political figure in Nova Scotia, Canada. He represented Lunenburg County in the Nova Scotia House of Assembly from 1876 to 1878 as a Liberal member.

== Early life and education ==
He was born in Mill Village, Queens County, Nova Scotia, the son of Edward Doran Davison and Desiah Mack, and was educated in Sackville, New Brunswick.

== Career ==
Following his schooling, he entered his father's lumber business. Davison was elected to the provincial assembly in an 1876 by-election held after Mather Byles DesBrisay was named a county judge. He became the senior member of the lumber company upon his father's death in 1894; he died less than three years later.

== Personal life ==
In 1873, he married Annie Foster.
