= George O. Lohnes =

Canadian politician

MLA for Lunenburg Centre
- In office 1956–1970
- Preceded by: new riding
- Succeeded by: Walton Cook

Personal details
- Born: August 8, 1898 Upper Northfield, Nova Scotia
- Died: September 6, 1982 (aged 84) Bridgewater, Nova Scotia
- Party: Progressive Conservative
- Occupation: farmer

George Oliver Lohnes (August 8, 1898 – September 6, 1982) was a Canadian politician. He represented the electoral district of Lunenburg Centre in the Nova Scotia House of Assembly from 1956 to 1970. He was a member of the Progressive Conservative Party of Nova Scotia.

Born in 1898 at Upper Northfield, Nova Scotia, Lohnes was a farmer by career. He married Evelyn Minetta Mossman (née Crouse) in 1938. Lohnes entered provincial politics in the 1956 election, winning the Lunenburg Centre riding by 152 votes. He was re-elected in the 1960, 1963, and 1967 elections. In the 1970 election, Lohnes was defeated by Liberal Walton Cook. Lohnes died at Bridgewater, Nova Scotia on September 6, 1982.
