= Wallace Norman Rehfuss =

Canadian politician

Wallace Norman Rehfuss (November 27, 1876 – November 5, 1939) was a physician and political figure in Nova Scotia. He represented Lunenburg County in the Nova Scotia House of Assembly from 1925 to 1928 as a Liberal-Conservative member.

== Early life and education ==
He was born in Conquerall Bank, Lunenburg County, Nova Scotia, the son of Philip Edward Rehfuss and Emma Elizabeth Ernst. Rehfuss was educated at the University of Pennsylvania and McGill University.

== Career ==
Rehfuss served as a member of the town council for Bridgewater. He was a member of the province's Executive Council from 1925 to 1928. Rehfuss served as president of the Canadian Medical Association. He helped establish the Dawson Memorial Hospital in Bridgewater and served as chairman of its board of governors.

== Death ==
Rehfuss died in Bridgewater at the age of 62.

== Personal life ==
In 1906, he married Pauline DeWolfe Marshall.
