= Gordon E. Romkey =

Canadian politician

Gordon Emerson Romkey

MLA for Lunenburg
- In office 1928–1953

Speaker of the Nova Scotia House of Assembly
- In office 1940–1953
- Preceded by: Moses Elijah McGarry
- Succeeded by: John Smith MacIvor

Personal details
- Born: May 14, 1885 West Dublin, Nova Scotia, Nova Scotia
- Died: September 3, 1977 (aged 92)
- Party: Liberal
- Occupation: merchant

Gordon Emerson Romkey (May 13, 1885 – September 3, 1977) was a general merchant and political figure in Nova Scotia, Canada. He represented Lunenburg in the Nova Scotia House of Assembly from 1928 to 1953 as a Liberal member.

== Early life ==
He was born in West Dublin, Nova Scotia, the son of Michael J. Romkey and Margaret S. Ritchie.

== Career ==
Romkey served on the municipal council and was warden from 1922 to 1928. He was named speaker for the provincial assembly in 1940, serving until his defeat when he ran for reelection in 1953.

== Death ==
He died in 1977.

== Personal life ==
In 1907, he married Elsie A. Slater.
