= Mahone Bay, Nova Scotia =

Mahone Bay
- Town
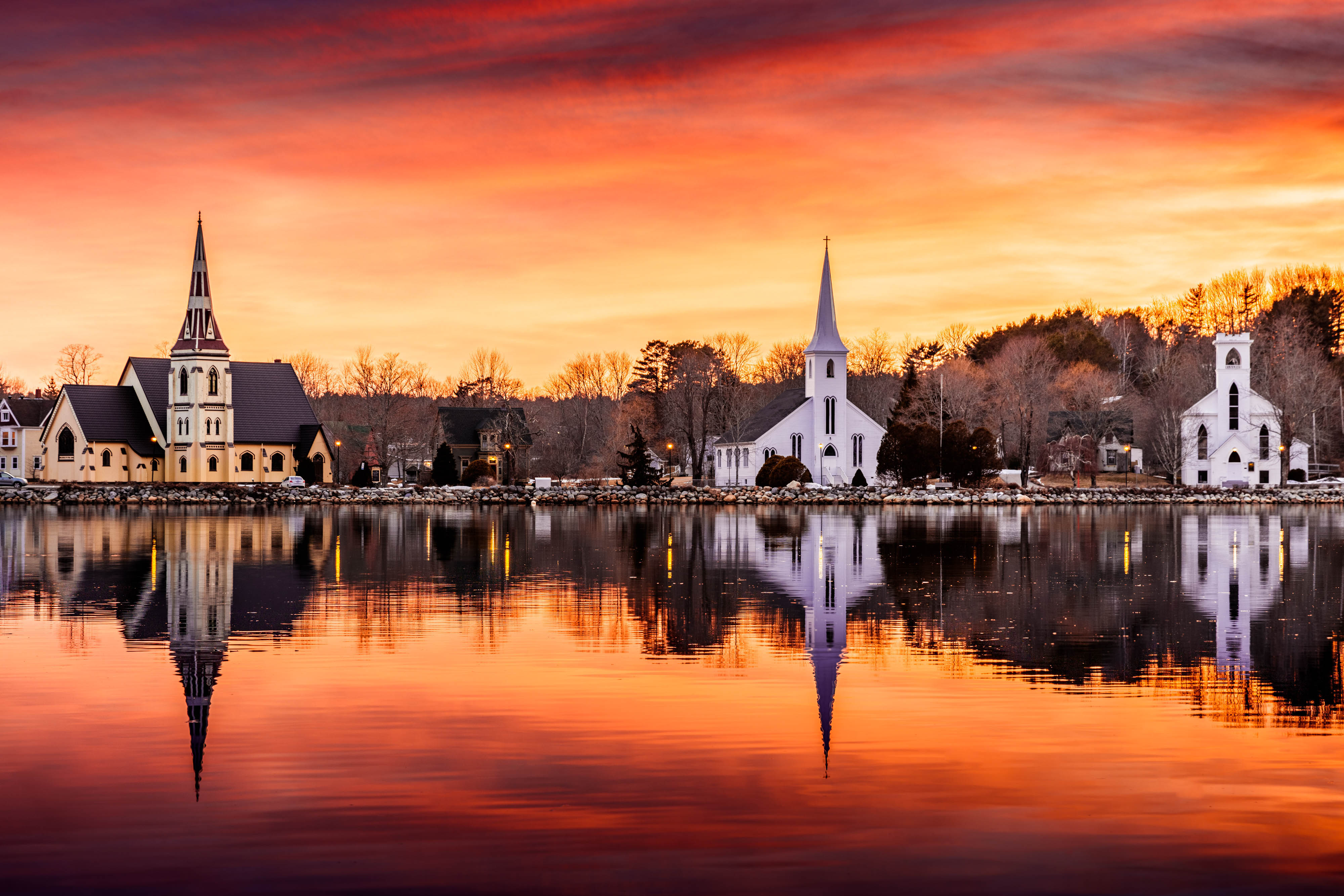
- The Famous Three Churches of Mahone Bay

- Seal
- Motto: "A Treasure Since 1754"
- Location within Nova Scotia
- Coordinates: 44°26′56″N 64°22′55″W
- Country: Canada
- Province: Nova Scotia
- County: Lunenburg County
- Founded: 1754
- Incorporated: March 31, 1919

Government
  - Mayor: Suzanne Lohnes-Croft
  - Governing Body: Mahone Bay Town Council
  - MLA: Suzanne Lohnes-Croft Liberal
  - MP: Rick Perkins (C)

Area (2021)
  - Total: 3.12 km^{2} (1.20 sq mi)
- Highest elevation: 24 m (79 ft)
- Lowest elevation: 0 m (0 ft)

Population (2021)
  - Total: 1,064
  - Density: 341.4/km^{2} (884/sq mi)
- Time zone: UTC-4 (AST)
- Postal code span: B0J
- Area code: 902
- Telephone Exchanges: 521, 624, 627
- Median household income (2020): $62,000
- Total private dwellings: 599
- Website: townofmahonebay.ca

Mahone Bay is a town on the northwest shore of Mahone Bay along the South Shore of Nova Scotia in Lunenburg County. A long-standing picturesque tourism destination, the town has recently enjoyed a growing reputation as a haven for entrepreneurs and business startups. The town has the fastest growing population of any municipality in Nova Scotia according to the 2016 census, experiencing 9.9% population growth.

== History ==
The end of glaciation began 13,500 years ago and ended with the region becoming largely ice free 11,000 years ago. The earliest evidence of Palaeo-Indian settlement in the region follows rapidly after deglaciation.

The Town of Mahone Bay is part of the Mi’kma’ki territory of the Mi’kmaq who have inhabited their traditional lands for over 13,500 years. Prior to arrival of the Europeans, Mi’kmaw lived in and around what is now Mahone Bay. Indian Point, just outside the town, was an important summertime settlement where the Mi’kmaq could enjoy the sheltered waters and plentiful food sources. In the winter, they would move inland from the coast using the rivers that flow into Mahone Bay harbour. There are many Mi’kmaq who live in the area today.

British officials placed public notices in Germany, southern France, Switzerland, and the Netherlands stating that those willing to move to their planned settlement in Nova Scotia would receive grants of land, food for a year, and a few farm animals. Between 1750 and 1752 more than 2,200 such “Foreign Protestants” made the long journey from Europe to Halifax.

In 1753, most of the new immigrants were brought from Halifax to Lunenburg, which was to be the centre of the planned settlement. The first to arrive were those who lived in town of Lunenberg and had farm lots throughout the peninsula, including Mahone Bay. They arrived under the leadership of mariner Ephraim Cook. The people who settled on the Lunenburg Peninsula, including the present-day village of Mahone Bay, were foreign protestants who were German, Swiss, and Montbéliardais settlers.

During the French and Indian War, there were nine Native and Acadian (Catholic) raids against the protestant settlers on the Lunenburg Peninsula. One such raid – the Raid on Lunenburg (1756) – happened just off the shores of Mahone Bay on present-day Covey Island and [John] Rous Island.

Another raid happened on 24 August 1758 in the village of Mahone Bay, when eight Mi'kmaq attacked the family homes of Lay and Brant. While they killed three people in the raid, the Mi'kmaq were unsuccessful in taking their scalps, which was the common practice for payment from the French.

Mills were established at the mouth of each of Mahone Bay's two rivers and over the decades a separate community evolved at Mahone Bay with blacksmiths, merchants, a large school, churches, and shipyards.

=== Shipbuilding ===
Mahone Bay's boat building history begins with the Mi’kmaq. The Mi’kmaq were built birch bark canoes. The British began the first industrial production of ships. They established sawmills to produce lumber for shipbuilding. The earliest official registration form found for a vessel built in Mahone Bay dates from 1817. By 1850, at least 43 vessels had already been built by small shipyards in the Mahone Bay area and larger shipyards began being established to build mainly schooners and other smaller vessels, primarily for fishing and moving goods. As years passed, the trend was to build larger vessels for longer distance trading with the United States, West Indies, and elsewhere.

By the end of WWI, there was no longer much demand for sailing vessels so the local shipyards began designing and building power vessels that used engines instead of sails for fishing and moving goods (including rum-running). Shipyards continued producing vessels during WWII. During this period, as many as 500 people were employed in Mahone Bay shipyards.

Although fishing vessels were still being built until 1967, after WWII the industry transitioned to mainly constructing pleasure boats. Fibreglass sailboats were built on the site of the present RPS Composites factory located at 740 Main Street, under several different company names, including Paceship Yachts. The final days of commercial boat building concentrated on the building of pleasure crafts. Mahone Bay Plycraft Co. built thousands of laminated plywood “runabout” boats from 1949 to 1962. Commercial shipbuilding in the Town of Mahone Bay wrapped up around 1975, when the last fibreglass yachts were built at Paceship.

World Wars I and II brought brief revivals of shipbuilding with construction of schooners, tugboats and barges. After the war, the shipyard became known for innovative production of moulded plywood boats. Later on, Paceship Yachts and McVay Fiberglass Yachts built fibreglass sailboats, such as the Paceship 20, designed in 1970.

There were six major shipyards that produced between 1850 – 1942: Obed H. Ham Yacht Works, Abraham Ernst/ Erst & Sons/ Ernst Shipbuilding, John Zwicker, John Mclean and Sons Shipyard, Elkanah Zwicker/ Titus Langilee, Henry Schnare."

== Today ==
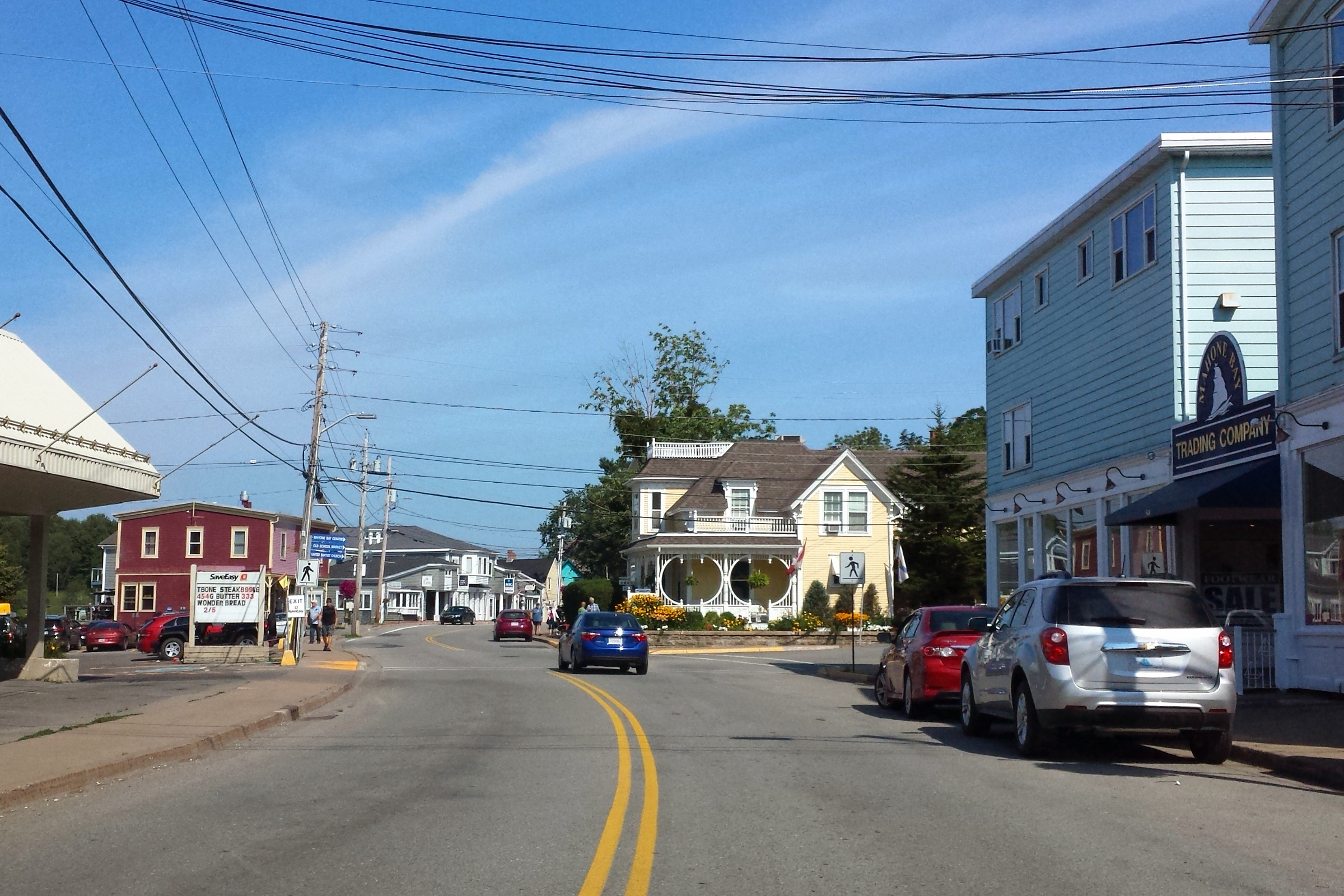
Mahone Bay town centre

The town is also known for a history of wooden boat building, it was the main industry of Mahone Bay in its earlier years. The Mahone Bay Museum explains and shows this history in detail. Until recent years the town's shipbuilding and boat-building heritage was celebrated by the "Mahone Bay Wooden Boat Festival".

The view across the harbour is of three prominent churches: St James' Anglican; St John's Evangelical Lutheran; and Trinity United. It has become an iconic image of Nova Scotia, frequently photographed and featured on postcards and calendars. The town has a number of upscale shops and restaurants which almost universally are designed to appeal to the tourist trade, and sometimes shut down during the winter months. The town also has a plastics factory.

== Demographics ==
Historical population
Year	Pop.	±%
1901	866	—
1911	951	+9.8%
1921	1,177	+23.8%
1931	1,065	−9.5%
1941	1,025	−3.8%
1951	1,019	−0.6%
1956	1,109	+8.8%
1961	1,103	−0.5%
1981	1,228	+11.3%
1986	1,093	−11.0%
1991	1,096	+0.3%
1996	1,017	−7.2%
2001	991	−2.6%
2006	904	−8.8%
2011	943	+4.3%
2016	1,036	+9.9%
2021	1,064	+2.7%

In the 2021 Census of Population conducted by Statistics Canada, Mahone Bay had a population of 1,064 living in 522 of its 599 total private dwellings, a change of 2.7% from its 2016 population of 1,036. With a land area of 3.12 km^{2} (1.20 sq mi), it had a population density of 341.0/km^{2} (883.3/sq mi) in 2021.

== Government ==
The Town of Mahone Bay is governed by a Council composed of a mayor and six councillors elected at-large. The mayor is Suzanne Lohnes-Croft . Day-to-day activities are managed by a chief administrative officer (CAO) who is accountable to Council. Municipal governments in Nova Scotia are elected every four years and the most recent round of elections took place on October 17, 2020. The provincial legislation that creates and empowers the municipality is the Nova Scotia Municipal Government Act.

Municipal Council is responsible for all facets of the municipal government, including directly delivered and shared or regional services. Directly delivered services include services such fire, public works, roads, as well as the municipally owned and operated electrical and water utilities. The municipality participates in shared services, such as library services and policing. The town's municipal operating budget was $2.7 million, and the town owned electric light utility of $1.9 million and water utility of $575 thousand resulted in a total proposed budget of $5.2 million in the 2017/18 fiscal year.

Mahone Bay is represented by one riding in the Nova Scotia House of Assembly and shares representation with one riding in Canada's House of Commons.

== See also ==
- List of municipalities in Nova Scotia
