= 2020 Nova Scotia municipal elections =

Canadian municipal election

- October 17, 2020

Municipal elections were held in the Canadian province of Nova Scotia on October 17, 2020. Here is a summary of the mayoral results in the largest municipalities in the province and the council results for Cape Breton and Kings County (for Halifax, see 2020 Halifax municipal election). Elections were also held for the Conseil scolaire acadien provincial school board.

== Amherst ==
Mayoral candidate	Vote	%
David Kogon (X)	2,818	70.80
Vaughn Martin	762	19.15
Ed Childs	400	10.05

=== Plebiscite ===
Should the Town of Amherst fluoridate the municipal water supply?
Option		%
No	2,296	60.81
Yes	1,480	39.19

== Bridgewater ==
Mayoral candidate	Vote	%
David Mitchell (X)	Acclaimed	

== Cape Breton Regional Municipality ==
=== Mayor ===
Challenging incumbent mayor Cecil Clarke are District 8 councillor Amanda McDougall, businessman Kevin MacEachern, 1990 Sydney mayoral candidate Chris Abbass, former Sydney Steel president John Strasser, and Archie MacKinnon who ran as an Independent candidate in the 2019 Canadian federal election in Sydney—Victoria.

Mayoral candidate	Vote	%
Amanda McDougall	24,319	47.67
Cecil Clarke (X)	20,789	40.75
Archie MacKinnon	3,426	6.72
John Strasser	1,379	2.70
Chris Abbass	708	1.39
Kevin MacEachern	397	0.78

=== Cape Breton Regional Council ===
Candidate	Vote	%
District 1 (Sydney Mines)
Gordon MacDonald	1,433	31.81
Danny Laffin	1,142	25.35
Duke Pero	883	19.60
Andrew Doyle	795	17.65
Shara Vickers	252	5.59
District 2 (North Sydney)
Earlene MacMullin (X)	3,086	67.91
Jim Dunphy	1,458	32.09
District 3 (The Lakes)
Cyril MacDonald	2,098	56.28
Blue Marshall (X)	1,221	32.75
Glen Murrant	223	5.98
John Whalley	186	4.99
District 4 (Westmount)
Steve Gillespie (X)	3,246	68.18
Yianni Harbis	1,272	26.72
Donalda Johnson	243	5.10
District 5 (Downtown Sydney)
Eldon MacDonald (X)	1,540	38.55
Shawn Lesnick	746	18.67
Scott MacQuarrie	740	18.52
Nigel Kearns	690	17.27
Christina Joe	279	6.98
District 6 (Sydney Southend)
Glenn Paruch	1,538	33.37
Barbara Beaton	1,351	29.31
Todd Riley	1,277	27.71
Joe Ward	339	7.36
Keith MacDonald	104	2.26
District 7 (Mira River)
Steve Parsons	1,194	29.93
Ivan Doncaster (X)	1,028	25.77
Adam Young	963	24.14
Kevin Hardy	804	20.16
District 8 (Louisbourg)
James Edwards	2,107	57.24
Diana MacKinnon-Furlong	840	22.82
Tracey Hilliard	734	19.94
District 9 (Glace Bay)
Kenny Tracey	2,630	63.19
Steven James MacNeil	1,049	25.20
Clarence Routledge	483	11.60
District 10 (Dominion/Glace Bay North)
Darren Bruckschwaiger (X)	3,535	80.82
Matthew Boyd	839	19.18
District 11 (New Waterford)
Darren O'Quinn	1,357	29.18
Johnny Miles	1,135	24.41
Dale Cadden	796	17.12
Arnie Nason	425	9.14
Jeff McNeil	317	6.82
Jennifer Heffernan	271	5.83
Laura Scheller Stanford	256	5.51
Chuck Ogley	93	2.00
District 12 (Whitney Pier)
Lorne Green	1,274	34.20
Kim Sheppard	1,218	32.70
Trevor Allen	533	14.31
Donald Campbell	361	9.69
Gary Borden	339	9.10

== Colchester County ==
Mayoral candidate	Vote	%
Christine Blair (X)	5,739	65.14
Bob Taylor	3,071	34.86

== Cumberland County ==
Cumberland County will be directly electing a mayor for the first time in 2020.

Mayoral candidate	Vote	%
Murray Scott	6,214	79.12
Jason Blanch	1,640	20.88

== District of Chester ==
Candidate	Vote	%
District 1
Andre Veinotte	418	47.66
Marshal Hector	337	38.42
Terri Demont	122	13.91
District 2
Floyd Shatford	Acclaimed	100.0
District 3
Danielle Barkhouse	623	81.65
Kerry Keddy	140	18.35
District 4
Allen Webber	365	60.73
Steven Millett	236	39.26
District 5
Abdella Assaff	616	72.79
Blake Rafuse	229	27.21
District 6
Tina Connors	Acclaimed	100.0
District 7
Sharon Church	487	79.57
Doug Sharpham	125	20.43

== Halifax ==
Mayoral candidate	Vote	%
Mike Savage (X)	102,690	80.21
Matt Whitman	13,439	10.50
Max Taylor	11,894	9.29

== Kentville ==
Mayoral candidate	Vote	%
Sandra Snow (X)	Acclaimed	

== Kings County ==
Mayoral candidate	Vote	%
Peter Muttart (X)	6,786	59.34
Shane Buchan	3,224	28.19
Jenn Kang	1,426	12.47

=== Kings County Municipal Council ===
Candidate	Vote	%
District 1
June Granger	1,029	61.91
Dean Tupper	633	38.09
District 2
Lexie Burgess Misner	410	41.46
Logan Morse	308	31.14
Blake Orman	271	27.40
District 3
Dick Killam	687	42.67
Wayne Atwater	657	40.81
Adrian Doherty	266	16.52
District 4
Martha Armstrong (X)	594	50.47
Riley Peckford	512	43.50
D. T. Siddhartha Fraser	71	6.03
District 5
Tim Harding	365	31.06
Jeff Robar	349	29.70
Ted Palmer	303	25.79
Justin Dorey	91	7.74
Glen Harnish	67	5.70
District 6
Joel Hirtle	884	63.19
Denise Bonnell	334	23.87
Darrell Pelton	103	7.36
Doug Ralph	78	5.58
District 7
Emily Lutz (X)	1,209	68.73
Bob Best (X)	550	31.27
District 8
Jim Winsor (X)	926	85.82
Rick Mehta	153	14.18
District 9
Peter Allen (X)	Acclaimed	

==== By-election ====
A by-election was held June 17–24, 2023 in District 8. Results:

Candidate	Vote	%
Kevin Davison	301	55.54
Shawn Maxwell	142	26.20
Trina Keddy	99	18.27

== District of the Municipality of Lunenburg ==
Mayoral candidate	Vote	%
Carolyn Bolivar-Getson (X)	5,437	60.41
Caleb Wheeldon	3,563	39.59

== Lunenburg (Town) ==
Mayoral candidate	Vote	%
Matt Risser	955	78.08
John McGee	268	21.91

== New Glasgow ==
Mayoral candidate	Vote	%
Nancy Dicks (X)	3,328	91.63
Mark Firth	304	8.37

== Pictou (Town) ==
Mayoral candidate	Vote	%
Jim Ryan (X)	Acclaimed	
Councillors
Melinda MacKenzie (X)	890	16.8
Nadine LeBlanc (X)	820	15.5
Dan Currie (X)	766	14.4
Shawn McNamara (X)	685	12.9
Cam Beaton	564	10.6
Jerry Cyr	543	10.2
Eric Daley	460	8.7
Kenny Paquet	395	7.5
Kevin Pettipas	174	3.3

== Region of Queens Municipality ==
Mayoral candidate	Vote	%
Darlene Norman	1,336	35.60
Susan Macleod	1,106	29.47
David B. Dagley (X)	845	22.52
Brian G. Fralic	466	12.42

== Truro ==
Mayoral candidate	Vote	%
Bill Mills (X)	2,558	62.97
Terry Baillie	1,504	37.03

== West Hants Regional Municipality ==
Prior to the District of West Hant's amalgamation with Windsor on April 1, 2020, the new West Hants Regional Municipality held elections on March 7, 2020. The new municipality will therefore not hold elections in October.

Mayoral results:

Mayoral Candidate	Vote	%
Abraham Zebian	4,043	65.48
Jennifer Daniels	1,437	23.28
Jim White	694	11.24

== Yarmouth (Town) ==
Mayoral Candidate	Vote	%
Pam Mood (X)	1,632	54.97
Charles A. Crosby	1,026	34.56
Angie Romard	224	7.54
Gregory Doucette	87	2.93
