= CASLE =

Canadian charity

Canadians for A Safe Learning Environment (CASLE)
- Formation: 1992
- Founder: Corinne W. Harland, Debbie F. Hum, Kim Given, Elaine Courtney, and Karen L.H. Robinson
- Dissolved: 2018
- Headquarters: Halifax, Nova Scotia, Canada
- President and CEO: Karen LH Robinson
- Website: https://casle.ca/about-us/
- Formerly called: Citizens for A Safe Learning Environment

Canadians for A Safe Learning Environment (CASLE), formerly known as Citizens for A Safe Learning Environment, was a Registered Canadian Charity founded in 1992, and based in Nova Scotia, Canada. The organization closed in 2018.

== History ==
CASLE began as a community organization in 1992, by parents/teachers Corinne W. Harland (1956–2020), Karen L H Robinson, Debbie Hum (went on to become a Halifax City Councilor for District 16), Kim Given, and Elaine Courtney, who saw that their children’s schools had significant unaddressed and ongoing Health and Safety issues. These included long-recognized hazards such as asbestos and fuel leaks, but also health issues that were at the time largely unrecognized, such as effects from indoor mold growth and toxins in cleaning and maintenance materials. They soon recognized that school indoor air quality and Health and Safety issues were system-wide and extended across Canada, the Americas, and beyond.

CASLE became partner to governments and agencies. For the initial 15 years there was generalized name recognition from media coverage of CASLE’s work being accomplished, however, awareness of CASLE’s work eventually extended mostly to governments, unions, researchers, school decision-makers or other organizations that worked in the field of school health and safety.

The paper by Ontario's Pollution Probe, Healthy Schools-Healthy Children: Improving the indoor Environment in Ontario Schools recommends other jurisdictions use Nova Scotia as a model (p. 49), lists CASLE as an organization that “had the ability to speak technically” (p. 33), and “The US EPA and the province of Nova Scotia have shown significant leadership in this regard.” (p. 52) Action items 4, 6, 7, 8 & 9 were led by CASLE representatives for the government departments. (p. 32-33, item 6.1.2).

Contributions by CASLE include guidelines for design and construction of healthy new buildings. Also, CASLE contributed to practical knowledge and experience that indoor mold growth is unhealthy for building occupants, that toxic chemical use in every-day products needed to be changed to less-toxic alternatives, that hazardous materials such as asbestos and silica dust, lead-bearing paints, and much more, were being mishandled in schools. CASLE and Robinson produced reports for and with several Nova Scotia government departments.

CASLE was a completely volunteer organization, with no paid staff. All hands-on work was done by the board of directors. Other notable board members who served for extended periods over the years were Janice M. Moore, Avis J. Ratchford (Degaust), Agnes M. Malouf, Sandra L. Moser, Mike Coughlan, and Kit (Christopher) Hood. Hood was co-creator of the three original Degrassi Junior High series and the feature-length “School’s Out.”

Some of the federal government and national agencies and organizations that CASLE worked with to pioneer lasting, practical, changes to school Environmental Health and Safety are:

- Toronto’s Women’s College Hospital produced Guidelines to Accommodate Students and Staff with Environmental Sensitivities, by N. Bradshaw and CASLE’s Robinson, 2010.
- Atlantic Health Promotion Research Center, Dalhousie University, Tools for Schools IAQ Action Kit Final Report 2003.
- Atlantic Health Promotion Research Center, Dalhousie University, Scent Research Module, Tools for Schools IAQ Action Kit, Canadian version.
- Canadian Partnership for Children’s Health and Environment (CPCHE). CASLE founded Healthy Schools Day in Canada – Journée des écoles saines du Canada in April 2009. The Canadian Partnership for Children’s Health and Environment (CPCHE) took over in 2017 as CASLE was closing.
- Canadian Human Rights Commission

== Awards ==
- CASLE received the Canadian Institute of Child Health’s (CICH) National Health Promotion and Innovation Award of Excellence (2005)
- CASLE’s Board members, Robinson and Hum, received Queen’s Golden Jubilee Medals 2002.
- President Robinson, received an Eco-Hero Award from the Nova Scotia Environmental Network for Excellence in Environment and Health, 2008.
- President Robinson received four Commendations from the Nova Scotia Legislature (1994, 2007, 2008, 2012)
