= Charles Crosby =

Charles Crosby may refer to:

- Charles A. Crosby, former mayor of the town of Yarmouth, Nova Scotia, Canada
- Charles N. Crosby (1876–1951), U.S. Representative from Pennsylvania
- Charles F. Crosby (1847–1889), American politician and lawyer
