= Mark Furey =

Canadian politician and police officer

The Honourable Mark Furey ECNS

Member of the Nova Scotia House of Assembly for Lunenburg West
- In office October 8, 2013 – July 17, 2021
- Preceded by: Gary Ramey
- Succeeded by: Becky Druhan

Minister of Justice and Attorney General of Nova Scotia and Provincial Secretary of Nova Scotia
- In office June 15, 2017 – February 23, 2021
- Premier: Stephen McNeil
- Preceded by: Diana Whalen
- Succeeded by: Randy Delorey

Minister of Labour Relations
- In office June 15, 2017 – February 23, 2021
- Premier: Stephen McNeil
- Preceded by: Position established
- Succeeded by: Randy Delorey

Personal details
- Party: Liberal

Mark Ignatius Furey is a Canadian politician and retired police officer, who was elected to the Nova Scotia House of Assembly in the 2013 provincial election. A member of the Nova Scotia Liberal Party, he represented the electoral district of Lunenburg West until his retirement from politics in 2021.

== Career ==
Furey is a retired police officer, having served in the Royal Canadian Mounted Police.

On October 22, 2013 Furey was appointed to the Executive Council of Nova Scotia where he served as Minister of Service Nova Scotia and Municipal Relations, as well as Minister responsible for Part II of the Gaming Control Act and the Minister responsible for the Residential Tenancies Act.

Furey was re-elected in the 2017 election. On June 15, 2017, premier Stephen McNeil shuffled his cabinet, moving Furey to Attorney General and Minister of Justice, Provincial Secretary, and the newly established Minister of Labour Relations.

== Electoral record ==
2017 Nova Scotia general election
| Party | Candidate | Votes | % | ±% |
|---|---|---|---|---|
| Liberal | Mark Furey | 3,839 | 47.1 | |
| Progressive Conservative | Carole Hipwell | 2,261 | 27.7 | |
| New Democratic Party | Lisa Norman | 1,690 | 20.7 | |
| Green | Michael Sheppard | 361 | 4.42 | – |

2013 Nova Scotia general election
| Party | Candidate | Votes | % | ±% |
|---|---|---|---|---|
| Liberal | Mark Furey | 3,931 | 43.10 | |
| New Democratic Party | Gary Ramey | 2,885 | 31.00 | |
| Progressive Conservative | David Mitchell | 2,143 | 23.50 | |

2009 Nova Scotia general election
| Party | Candidate | Votes | % | ±% |
|---|---|---|---|---|
| New Democratic Party | Gary Ramey | 3,600 | 39.60 | |
| Progressive Conservative | Carolyn Bolivar-Getson | 3,045 | 33.50 | |
| Liberal | Mark Furey | 2,297 | 25.27 | |
| Green | Emily Richardson | 148 | 1.63 | – |
