= Peter Mancini =

Canadian politician

Member of Parliament for Sydney—Victoria
- In office 1997–2000
- Preceded by: new riding
- Succeeded by: Mark Eyking

Personal details
- Born: Dominic Peter Mancini; August 1, 1956 (age 69) Westmount, Nova Scotia, Canada
- Party: New Democratic Party
- Spouse: Marian Mancini
- Profession: Lawyer

Dominic Peter Mancini (born August 1, 1956) is a Canadian politician and lawyer. Mancini was elected to the House of Commons of Canada in the 1997 federal election that saw a breakthrough for the New Democratic Party in the province of Nova Scotia. Mancini represented the riding of Sydney—Victoria until the 2000 federal election when he was defeated by Liberal Mark Eyking.

== Early life and education ==
Born in Westmount, Nova Scotia, Mancini was educated at Dalhousie University, where he was a member of the Dalhousie Senate and Vice President of the Student Council. He graduated from Dalhousie Law School in 1982.

== Legal career ==
He has worked for Nova Scotia Legal Aid in criminal and family law since 1986 save for one year when he taught at the University College of Cape Breton and his years in parliament.

On December 12, 2014, Mancini was appointed a Queen's Counsel.

== Political career ==
Mancini received over 50% of the popular vote in 1997. It was during his time as MP that the Liberal Government announced the shutdown of the coal mines run by the Cape Breton Development Corporation. Mancini and other political leaders fought for increased pension packages for the workers and an economic diversification fund. He was the MP when the federal government began a remediation program for the Sydney Tar Ponds. When Robert Chisholm resigned as leader of the Nova Scotia NDP in 1999, Mancini was seen as a possible front runner for the post but declined to run.

He served as the NDP's justice critic in the 36th Canadian Parliament. He moved to Dartmouth, Nova Scotia following his electoral defeat. He was unsuccessful in his attempt at a comeback in the 2006 federal election in the riding of Dartmouth—Cole Harbour losing to incumbent Michael Savage by just over 4,000 votes.

== Personal life ==
He is married to Marian Mancini, who was elected to the Nova Scotia House of Assembly on July 14, 2015.

== Electoral record ==
2006 Canadian federal election: Dartmouth—Cole Harbour
Party	Candidate	Votes	%	±%	Expenditures
Liberal	Mike Savage	19,027	42.32	+0.25	$67,910.96
New Democratic	Peter Mancini	14,612	32.50	±0	$60,717.57
Conservative	Robert A. Campbell	10,259	22.82	+1.72	$41,775.58
Green	Elizabeth Perry	1,005	2.24	-0.92	$582.70
Marxist–Leninist	Charles Spurr	56	0.12	-0.05	none listed
Total valid votes/expense limit		44,959	100.0		$76,265
Total rejected, unmarked and declined ballots		166	0.37	-0.07	
Turnout		45,125	62.44	+0.51	
Eligible voters		72,264			
Liberal hold		Swing		+0.12	

2000 Canadian federal election: Sydney—Victoria
Party	Candidate	Votes	%	±%
Liberal	Mark Eyking	19,388	49.8	+23.5
New Democratic	Peter Mancini	14,216	36.5	-14.6
Progressive Conservative	Anna Curtis-Steele	3,779	9.7	-12.9
Alliance	Rod A.M. Farrell	1,528	3.9	
Total valid votes		38,911	100.0	

1997 Canadian federal election: Sydney—Victoria
Party	Candidate	Votes	%
New Democratic	Peter Mancini	22,455	51.1
Liberal	Vince MacLean	11,569	26.3
Progressive Conservative	Cecil Clarke	9,920	22.6
Total valid votes		43,944	100.0
