= Cecil Clarke =

Canadian politician

His Worship The Honourable Cecil Clarke ECNS

Speaker of the Nova Scotia House of Assembly
- In office June 29, 2006 – October 23, 2007
- Preceded by: Murray Scott
- Succeeded by: Alfie MacLeod

Member of the Nova Scotia House of Assembly for Cape Breton North
- In office March 6, 2001 – March 25, 2011
- Preceded by: Russell MacLellan
- Succeeded by: Eddie Orrell

Mayor of Cape Breton Regional Municipality
- In office November 5, 2012 – October 17, 2020
- Preceded by: John W. Morgan
- Succeeded by: Amanda McDougall
- Incumbent
- Assumed office October 30, 2024
- Preceded by: Amanda McDougall

Minister of Justice and Attorney General of Nova Scotia and Provincial Secretary of Nova Scotia
- In office September 23, 2007 – June 19, 2009
- Preceded by: Murray Scott
- Succeeded by: Ross Landry

Personal details
- Born: Cecil Phillip Clarke; April 12, 1968 (age 58) North Sydney, Nova Scotia, Canada
- Party: Progressive Conservative

Cecil Phillip Clarke (born April 12, 1968) is a politician in Nova Scotia, Canada. He has been the mayor of the Cape Breton Regional Municipality since 2024, and previously served as mayor from 2012 to 2020. He also represented the riding of Cape Breton North in the Nova Scotia House of Assembly, from 2001 to 2011 as a Progressive Conservative.

== Before politics ==
Born in North Sydney, Nova Scotia, Clarke graduated with a bachelor's degree from Mount Allison University in 1990.

== Political career ==
In the 1997 federal election, Clarke made his first attempt at entering politics, running as the Progressive Conservative candidate in Sydney—Victoria. He finished third behind New Democrat Peter Mancini, and Liberal Vince MacLean. Clarke turned to provincial politics and was elected in a March 2001 byelection. He was re-elected in the 2003, 2006 and 2009 general elections. He served in the Executive Council of Nova Scotia as Minister of Economic Development, Minister of Energy, Attorney General and Minister of Justice as well as Provincial Secretary. Clarke was Speaker of the House of Assembly of Nova Scotia from June 2006 to October 2007.

In July 2010, Clarke announced that he was seeking the federal Conservative nomination for the riding of Sydney—Victoria. On March 25, 2011, Clarke resigned his seat in the Nova Scotia legislature so he could run for the Conservatives in the 2011 federal election. On May 2, 2011, Clarke was defeated in his bid for a seat in the House of Commons of Canada by Liberal incumbent Mark Eyking.

On September 6, 2012, Clarke announced that he was entering the race for mayor of the Cape Breton Regional Municipality in the 2012 Nova Scotia municipal elections. On October 20, 2012, Clarke was elected mayor. He assumed office on November 5, 2012.

Clarke was re-elected mayor in the 2016 municipal election.

Clarke was criticized in early 2018 for a trip to China with 3 CBRM Staff on port development business at an estimated cost of $30,000, including business-class tickets. CBRM Council had previously voted to give gave Mayor Clarke the authority to travel and do whatever is necessary for port development.

In 2018, Clarke came out as gay, revealing that someone had threatened to out him.

On February 3, 2018, Clarke announced his candidacy for the leadership of the Progressive Conservative Party of Nova Scotia. He lost to Tim Houston on October 27, 2018. Clarke was defeated when he ran for re-election in the 2020 municipal election.

Cecil Clarke was re-elected as mayor of CBRM on October 19, 2024. Clarke ran on a platform of getting back to basics, providing value for rate payers, making CBRM safe and accessible. He, along with the new Council, was sworn in to office on October 30, 2024.

== Electoral record ==
2011 Canadian federal election: Sydney—Victoria
Party	Candidate	Votes	%	±%	Expenditures
Liberal	Mark Eyking	14,788	39.91	-9.49	$67,454.53
Conservative	Cecil Clarke	14,023	37.85	+17.23	$77,334.98
New Democratic	Kathy MacLeod	7,049	19.02	-5.42	$17,238.77
Green	Chris Milburn	1,191	3.21	-2.33	$0.00
Total valid votes/expense limit		37,051	100.0		$80,666.28
Total rejected, unmarked and declined ballots		279	0.75	+0.03	
Turnout		37,330	61.48	+4.07	
Eligible voters		60,719			
Liberal hold		Swing		-13.36	

2009 Nova Scotia general election
Party	Candidate	Votes	%	±%
Progressive Conservative	Cecil Clarke	3,477	44.47	-6.24
New Democratic	Russell MacDonald	3,312	42.36	+16.53
Liberal	Ken Jardine	921	11.78	-10.21
Green	Chris Milburn	108	1.38	-0.09
Total valid votes		7,818	99.42	–
Total rejected ballots		0.58	–	
Turnout		7,864	54.62	-6.05
Eligible voters		14,397		
Progressive Conservative hold		Swing		-11.39
Source: Elections Nova Scotia

2006 Nova Scotia general election
Party	Candidate	Votes	%	±%
Progressive Conservative	Cecil Clarke	4,310	50.71	+7.25
New Democratic	Russell MacDonald	2,195	25.83	+5.98
Liberal	Fred Tilley	1,869	21.99	-14.70
Green	Marc Doucet	125	1.47	+1.47
Total valid votes		8,499	99.53	–
Total rejected ballots		40	0.47	–
Turnout		8,539	60.67	-4.88
Eligible voters		14,075		
Progressive Conservative hold		Swing		+6.61
Source: Elections Nova Scotia

2003 Nova Scotia general election
Party	Candidate	Votes	%	±%
Progressive Conservative	Cecil Clarke	3,754	43.46	+5.24
Liberal	Mike White	3,169	36.69	+4.21
New Democratic	Cecil Snow	1,714	19.85	-9.45
Total valid votes		8,637	99.15	–
Total rejected ballots		0.85	–	
Turnout		8,711	65.55	-2.39
Eligible voters		13,288		
Progressive Conservative hold		Swing		+4.73
Source: Elections Nova Scotia

Nova Scotia provincial by-election, March 6, 2001 upon the resignation of Russell MacLellan
Party	Candidate	Votes	%	±%
Progressive Conservative	Cecil Clarke	3,024	38.22	+16.74
Liberal	Wes Stubbert	2,570	32.48	-16.21
New Democratic	Helen MacDonald	2,319	29.30	-0.53
Total valid votes		7,913	99.48	–
Total rejected ballots		41	0.52	–
Turnout		7,954	67.94	-5.63
Eligible voters		11,708		
Progressive Conservative gain from Liberal		Swing		+16.48
Source: Elections Nova Scotia

1997 Canadian federal election: Sydney—Victoria
Party	Candidate	Votes	%
New Democratic	Peter Mancini	22,455	51.1
Liberal	Vince MacLean	11,569	26.3
Progressive Conservative	Cecil Clarke	9,920	22.6
Total valid votes		43,944	100.0
