= Gary Ramey =

Canadian politician

MLA for Lunenburg West
- In office June 9, 2009 – October 8, 2013
- Preceded by: Carolyn Bolivar-Getson
- Succeeded by: Mark Furey

Personal details
- Party: New Democrat

Gary William Ramey is a Canadian politician, who was elected to the Nova Scotia House of Assembly in the 2009 provincial election. He represented the electoral district of Lunenburg West as a member of the New Democratic Party until his defeat in the 2013 election.

Ramey was the ministerial assistant for the Department of Health in the government of Darrell Dexter.
