= Lunenburg West =

Provincial electoral district in Nova Scotia, Canada

Nova Scotia electoral district

Provincial electoral district
- Legislature: Nova Scotia House of Assembly
MLA
Becky Druhan
Liberal
- District created: 1956
- First contested: 1956
- Last contested: 2024

Demographics
- Population (2011): 18,017
- Electors: 16,116
- Area (km²): 1,001
- Pop. density (per km²): 18
- Census division: Lunenburg
- Census subdivision(s): Bridgewater, LaHave, Hebbville

Lunenburg West is a provincial electoral district in Nova Scotia, Canada, that elects one member of the Nova Scotia House of Assembly. It was created in 1956 from the riding of Lunenburg County.

The riding includes the town of Bridgewater, LaHave, and Hebbville.

== Geography ==
Lunenburg West has 1,001 km^{2} (386 sq mi) of landmass.

== Members of the Legislative Assembly ==
This riding has elected the following members of the Legislative Assembly:

Lunenburg West
Legislature	Years	Member	Party
Riding created from Lunenburg
46th	1956–1960	Harley J. Spence	Progressive Conservative
47th	1960–1963	Harley J. Spence	Progressive Conservative
48th	1963–1967	Harley J. Spence	Progressive Conservative
49th	1967–1970	Harley J. Spence	Progressive Conservative
50th	1970–1974	Maurice DeLorey	Liberal
51st	1974–1978	Maurice DeLorey	Liberal
52nd	1978–1981	Mel Pickings	Progressive Conservative
53rd	1981–1984	Mel Pickings	Progressive Conservative
54th	1984–1988	Mel Pickings	Progressive Conservative
55th	1988–1993	Marie Dechman	Progressive Conservative
56th	1993–1998	Don Downe	Liberal
57th	1998–1999	Don Downe	Liberal
58th	1999–2003	Don Downe	Liberal
59th	2003–2006	Carolyn Bolivar-Getson	Progressive Conservative
60th	2006–2009	Carolyn Bolivar-Getson	Progressive Conservative
61st	2009–2013	Gary Ramey	New Democratic
62nd	2013–2017	Mark Furey	Liberal
63rd	2017–2021	Mark Furey	Liberal
64th	2021–2024	Becky Druhan	Progressive Conservative
65th	2024–2025	Becky Druhan	Progressive Conservative
65th	2025–2026	Becky Druhan	Independent
65th	2026–present	Becky Druhan	Liberal

== Election results ==
=== 2024 ===
2024 Nova Scotia general election
Party	Candidate	Votes	%	±%
Progressive Conservative	Becky Druhan	4,239	56.28	+11.86
Liberal	Jonathan Crouse	2,302	30.56	-4.37
New Democratic	Nicholas Plovesan	846	11.23	-7.44
Green	Mitchell Thomas-Langford	145	1.93	-0.04
Total valid votes		7,532		
Total rejected ballots		39		
Turnout		7,572	43.98	
Eligible voters		17,217		
Progressive Conservative hold		Swing		
Source: Elections Nova Scotia

=== 2021 ===
2021 Nova Scotia general election
Party	Candidate	Votes	%	±%	Expenditures
Progressive Conservative	Becky Druhan	4,065	44.42	+16.69	$41,784.29
Liberal	Jennifer Naugler	3,197	34.94	-12.15	$43,562.40
New Democratic	Merydie Ross	1,709	18.67	-2.08	$48,588.41
Green	Eric Wade	180	1.97	-2.46	$200.00
Total valid votes/expense limit		9,151	99.75	–	$94,583.99
Total rejected ballots		23	0.25		
Turnout		9,174	55.65		
Eligible voters		16,484			
Progressive Conservative gain from Liberal		Swing		+14.42	
Source: Elections Nova Scotia

=== 2017 ===
2017 Nova Scotia general election
Party	Candidate	Votes	%	±%
Liberal	Mark Furey	3,839	47.10	+4.00
Progressive Conservative	Carole Hipwell	2,261	27.74	+4.24
New Democratic	Lisa Norman	1,690	20.73	-10.27
Green	Michael Sheppard	361	4.43	
Total valid votes		8,151	100.0	
Total rejected ballots		46	0.56	
Turnout		8,197	50.86	
Eligible voters		16,116		
Liberal hold		Swing		-0.12
Source: Elections Nova Scotia

2017 provincial election redistributed results
Party	Vote	%
Liberal	3,829	47.09
Progressive Conservative	2,255	27.73
New Democratic	1,687	20.75
Green	360	4.43

=== 2013 ===
2013 Nova Scotia general election
Party	Candidate	Votes	%	±%
Liberal	Mark Furey	3,931	43.11	17.84
New Democratic	Gary Ramey	2,885	31.64	-7.97
Progressive Conservative	David Mitchell	2,143	23.50	-10.00
Green	Rob Pierce	160	1.75	0.13
Total		9,119	–	
Source(s) Source: Nova Scotia Legislature (2024). "Electoral History for Lunenburg West" (PDF). nslegislature.ca. Nova Scotia, Chief Electoral Officer (2013). 39th Provincial General Election, October 8, 2013: Volume 1 – Statement of Votes & Statistics (PDF) (Report). Elections Nova Scotia. Archived from the original (PDF) on 10 April 2018.

=== 2009 ===
2009 Nova Scotia general election
Party	Candidate	Votes	%	±%
New Democratic	Gary Ramey	3,600	39.60	0.41
Progressive Conservative	Carolyn Bolivar-Getson	3,045	33.50	-9.71
Liberal	Mark Furey	2,297	25.27	9.54
Green	Emily Richardson	148	1.63	-0.24
Total		9,090	–	
Source(s) Source: Nova Scotia Legislature (2024). "Electoral History for Lunenburg West" (PDF). nslegislature.ca.

=== 2006 ===
2006 Nova Scotia general election
Party	Candidate	Votes	%	±%
Progressive Conservative	Carolyn Bolivar-Getson	3,637	43.21	3.53
New Democratic	Bill Smith	3,299	39.19	11.39
Liberal	Martin E. Bell	1,324	15.73	-16.79
Green	Brendan MacNeil	157	1.87	–
Total		8,417	–	
Source(s) Source: Nova Scotia Legislature (2024). "Electoral History for Lunenburg West" (PDF). nslegislature.ca.

=== 2003 ===
2003 Nova Scotia general election
Party	Candidate	Votes	%	±%
Progressive Conservative	Carolyn Bolivar-Getson	3,111	39.68	4.89
Liberal	John MacDonald	2,550	32.52	-12.94
New Democratic	David Ferguson	2,180	27.80	8.05
Total		7,841	–	
Source(s) Source: Nova Scotia Legislature (2024). "Electoral History for Lunenburg West" (PDF). nslegislature.ca.

=== 1999 ===
1999 Nova Scotia general election
Party	Candidate	Votes	%	±%
Liberal	Don Downe	4,248	45.46	-2.49
Progressive Conservative	Jerry Swain	3,251	34.79	12.52
New Democratic	Eric Hustvedt	1,846	19.75	-10.03
Total		9,345	–	
Source(s) Source: Nova Scotia Legislature (2024). "Electoral History for Lunenburg West" (PDF). nslegislature.ca. Nova Scotia, Chief Electoral Officer (1999). Returns of the General Election for the House of Assembly, Thirty-Fifth General Election (Report). Elections Nova Scotia.

=== 1998 ===
1998 Nova Scotia general election
Party	Candidate	Votes	%	±%
Liberal	Don Downe	4,364	47.95	-12.65
New Democratic	Eric Hustvedt	2,711	29.78	18.47
Progressive Conservative	Lou Centa	2,027	22.27	-5.82
Total		9,102	–	
Source(s) Source: Nova Scotia Legislature (2024). "Electoral History for Lunenburg West" (PDF). nslegislature.ca.

=== 1993 ===
1993 Nova Scotia general election
Party	Candidate	Votes	%	±%
Liberal	Don Downe	6,276	60.59	21.49
Progressive Conservative	Marie Dechman	2,910	28.09	-14.24
New Democratic	Karen Reinhardt	1,172	11.31	-7.24
Total		10,358	–	
Source(s) Source: Nova Scotia Legislature (2024). "Electoral History for Lunenburg West" (PDF). nslegislature.ca. Nova Scotia, Chief Electoral Officer (1993). Returns of the General Election for the House of Assembly, Thirty-Third General Election (PDF) (Report). Queen's Printer. Archived from the original (PDF) on 18 June 2018.

=== 1988 ===
1988 Nova Scotia general election
Party	Candidate	Votes	%	±%
Progressive Conservative	Marie Dechman	3,511	42.34	-8.91
Liberal	Jack Logan	3,243	39.11	6.85
New Democratic	John Scott	1,539	18.56	2.06
Total		8,293	–	
Source(s) Source: Nova Scotia Legislature (2024). "Electoral History for Lunenburg West" (PDF). nslegislature.ca. Nova Scotia, Chief Electoral Officer (1988). Returns of the General Election for the House of Assembly, Thirty-Second General Election (PDF) (Report). Queen's Printer. Archived from the original (PDF) on 7 July 2018.

=== 1984 ===
1984 Nova Scotia general election
Party	Candidate	Votes	%	±%
Progressive Conservative	Mel Pickings	3,435	51.25	-2.42
Liberal	Carroll W. Young	2,162	32.25	0.14
New Democratic	Martha Laurence	1,106	16.50	2.28
Total		6,703	–	
Source(s) Source: Nova Scotia Legislature (2024). "Electoral History for Lunenburg West" (PDF). nslegislature.ca. Nova Scotia, Chief Electoral Officer (1984). Returns of the General Election for the House of Assembly, Thirty-First General Election (PDF) (Report). Queen's Printer. Archived from the original (PDF) on 31 July 2017.

=== 1981 ===
1981 Nova Scotia general election
Party	Candidate	Votes	%	±%
Progressive Conservative	Mel Pickings	3,875	53.66	2.52
Liberal	Pauline Himmelman	2,319	32.11	-4.42
New Democratic	Carl E. Simpson	1,027	14.22	1.90
Total		7,221	–	
Source(s) Source: Nova Scotia Legislature (2024). "Electoral History for Lunenburg West" (PDF). nslegislature.ca. Nova Scotia, Chief Electoral Officer (1981). Returns of the General Election for the House of Assembly, Thirtieth General Election (PDF) (Report). Queen's Printer. Archived from the original (PDF) on 31 July 2017.

=== 1978 ===
1978 Nova Scotia general election
Party	Candidate	Votes	%	±%
Progressive Conservative	Mel Pickings	3,907	51.15	11.21
Liberal	Maurice DeLory	2,791	36.54	-18.38
New Democratic	G. M. Dean	941	12.32	7.17
Total		7,639	–	
Source(s) Source: Nova Scotia Legislature (2024). "Electoral History for Lunenburg West" (PDF). nslegislature.ca. Nova Scotia, Chief Electoral Officer (1978). Returns of the General Election for the House of Assembly, Twenty-Ninth General Election (PDF) (Report). Queen's Printer. Archived from the original (PDF) on 18 June 2018.

=== 1974 ===
1974 Nova Scotia general election
Party	Candidate	Votes	%	±%
Liberal	Maurice DeLory	3,635	54.92	1.74
Progressive Conservative	Ella Spence	2,643	39.93	-6.89
New Democratic	William R. Griswold	341	5.15	–
Total		6,619	–	
Source(s) Source: Nova Scotia Legislature (2024). "Electoral History for Lunenburg West" (PDF). nslegislature.ca. Nova Scotia, Chief Electoral Officer (1974). Returns of the General Election for the House of Assembly, Twenty-Eighth General Election (PDF) (Report). Queen's Printer. Archived from the original (PDF) on 18 June 2018.

=== 1970 ===
1970 Nova Scotia general election
Party	Candidate	Votes	%	±%
Liberal	Maurice DeLory	3,086	53.18	6.46
Progressive Conservative	R. Clifford Levy	2,717	46.82	-3.18
Total		5,803	–	
Source(s) Source: Nova Scotia Legislature (2024). "Electoral History for Lunenburg West" (PDF). nslegislature.ca. Nova Scotia, Legislative Assembly (1970). Returns of the General Election for the House of Assembly, 1970 (PDF) (Report). Queen's Printer. Archived from the original (PDF) on 25 July 2018.

=== 1967 ===
1967 Nova Scotia general election
Party	Candidate	Votes	%	±%
Progressive Conservative	Harley J. Spence	2,564	50.00	-8.12
Liberal	Carroll W. Young	2,396	46.72	4.85
New Democratic	Wilson Touchie	168	3.28	–
Total		5,128	–	
Source(s) Source: Nova Scotia Legislature (2024). "Electoral History for Lunenburg West" (PDF). nslegislature.ca. Nova Scotia Legislature (1967). Returns of the General Election for the House of Assembly (PDF) (Report). Queen's Printer. Archived from the original (PDF) on 25 July 2018.

=== 1963 ===
1963 Nova Scotia general election
Party	Candidate	Votes	%	±%
Progressive Conservative	Harley J. Spence	2,937	58.12	5.19
Liberal	Joye F. Davison	2,116	41.88	-5.19
Total		5,053	–	
Source(s) Source: Nova Scotia Legislature (2024). "Electoral History for Lunenburg West" (PDF). nslegislature.ca. Nova Scotia Legislature (1963). Returns of the General Election for the House of Assembly (PDF) (Report). Queen's Printer. Archived from the original (PDF) on 25 July 2018.

=== 1960 ===
1960 Nova Scotia general election
Party	Candidate	Votes	%	±%
Progressive Conservative	Harley J. Spence	2,858	52.94	2.27
Liberal	Frederck E. L. Fowke	2,541	47.06	-2.27
Total		5,399	–	
Source(s) Source: Nova Scotia Legislature (2024). "Electoral History for Lunenburg West" (PDF). nslegislature.ca. Nova Scotia Legislature (1960). Returns of the General Election for the House of Assembly (PDF) (Report). Queen's Printer. Archived from the original (PDF) on 25 July 2018.

=== 1956 ===
1956 Nova Scotia general election
Party	Candidate	Votes	%	±%
Progressive Conservative	Harley J. Spence	2,567	50.66	–
Liberal	Frederick E. L. Fowke	2,500	49.34	–
Total		5,067	–	
Source(s) Source: Nova Scotia Legislature (2024). "Electoral History for Lunenburg West" (PDF). nslegislature.ca. Nova Scotia Legislature (1956). Returns of the General Election for the House of Assembly (PDF) (Report). Queen's Printer. Archived from the original (PDF) on 10 September 2018.

== See also ==
- List of Nova Scotia provincial electoral districts
- Canadian provincial electoral districts
