= 2008 Halifax municipal election =

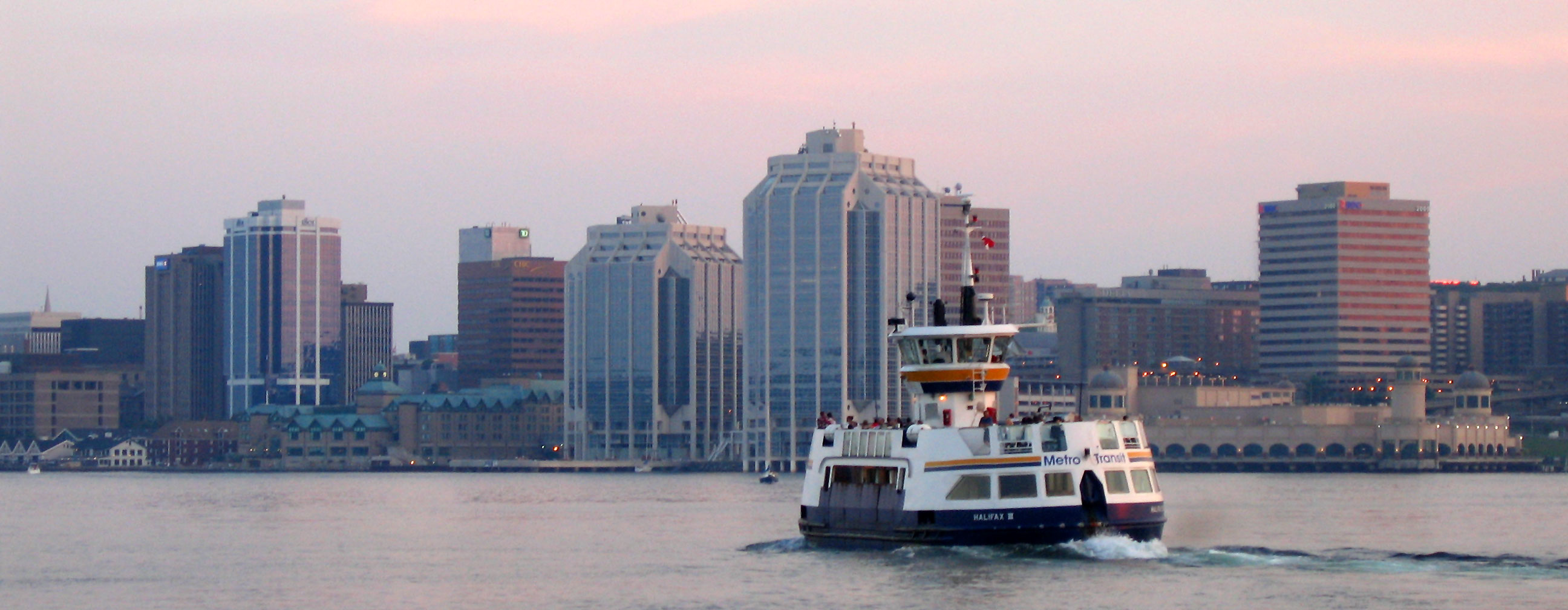
Halifax waterfront

The Halifax Regional Municipality is governed by a mayor (elected at large) and a twenty-three person council, who are elected by geographic district; municipal elections occur every four years. HRM has established community councils where three or more councillors agree to form these councils to deal primarily with local development issues. Most community council decisions are subject to final approval by regional council. The incumbent Mayor of the Halifax Regional Municipality was Peter J. Kelly.

The Halifax Regional Council is responsible for all facets of municipal government, including the Halifax Regional Police, Halifax Public Libraries, Halifax Fire and Emergency, Halifax Regional Water Commission, parks and recreation, civic addressing, public works, waste management, and planning and development.

The 2008 municipal elections of the Halifax Regional Municipality took place on October 18, 2008 in conjunction with Municipal elections across the province. Elections have been held every four years since the amalgamation of the cities of Halifax and Dartmouth, the town of Bedford and Halifax County into the Halifax Regional Municipality in 1996. At the time, the regional council was made up of twenty-three councillors and one mayor, all positions were up for election.

There are no political parties at the municipal level in Nova Scotia, so all candidates run as independents. Voter turnout in the last 2004 mayoral election was 54.45%.

Advance voting was available using an internet voting system.

== Halifax Regional Municipality Mayor ==
HRM Total Population, 2007 Census: 385,500
Candidate	Votes	%	±
Peter J. Kelly - (Incumbent)	57,229	56.827	
Sheila Fougere	41,107	40.818	
David Boyd	2,372	2.356	
Turnout	100,708	26.124	

(Polls reporting: 569 of 570)

== District 1: Eastern Shore - Musquodoboit Valley ==
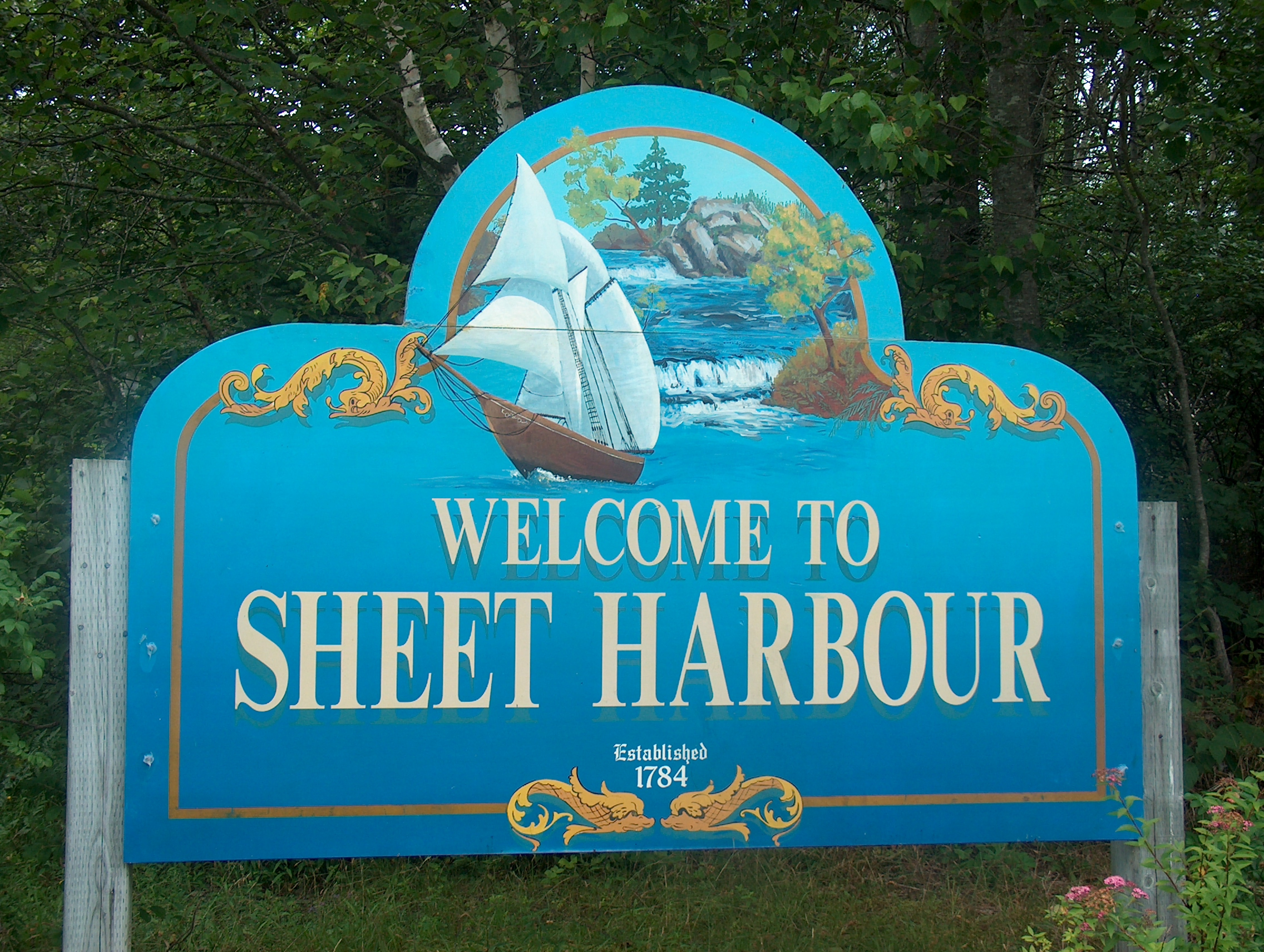
Sheet Harbour

Total Population, 2006 Census: 13,655
Candidate	Votes	%	±
Steve Streatch - (Incumbent)	2312	61.46%	
Bridget Ann Boutilier	1450	38.54%	
Turnout	3762	37.05%	

2004 Election - Steve Streatch 2,366 (46.4%); Laurie Taylor 1,367 (26.9%); Martin Singh 740 (14.59%); Randy Carter 600 (11.83%) - Voter turnout: 54.58%

== District 2: Waverley - Fall River - Beaver Bank ==
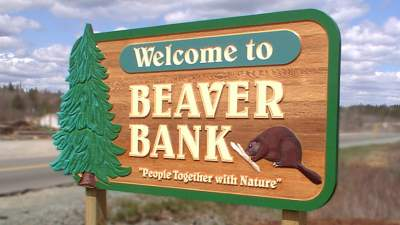
Beaver Bank

Total Population, 2006 Census: 18,547
Candidate	Votes	%	±
Barry Dalrymple	3727	56.61%	
Krista Snow - (Incumbent)	2857	43.39%	
Turnout	6584	48.00%	

2004 Election - Krista Snow 2,577 (34.86%); Wayne MacRae 2,317 (31.34%); David Merrigan 1,573 (21.28%); Alexander Boyd 866 (11.71%); John Woods 60 (0.81%) - Voter turnout: 58.57%

== District 3: Preston - Lawrencetown - Chezzetcook ==
Chezzetcook

Total Population, 2006 Census: 19,657
Candidate	Votes	%	±
David Hendsbee - (Incumbent)	2957	60.43%	
Spencer Colley	1936	39.57%	
Turnout	4893	35.03%	

2004 Election - David Hendsbee 4,217 (71.58%); Dexter Power 1,244 (21.12%); David Hill 430 (7.30%) - Voter Turnout: 43.93%

== District 4: Cole Harbour ==
Total Population, 2006 Census: 19,096
Candidate	Votes	%	±
Lorelei Nicoll	2790	57.41%	
Julia MacPherson	757	15.58%	
Mark R Fernando	705	14.51%	
Barry Smith	608	12.51%	
Turnout	4860	34.65%	

2004 Election - Harry McInroy 3,566 (54.19%); Ron Cooper 3,014 (45.81%) - Voter Turnout: 48.22%

== District 5: Dartmouth Centre ==
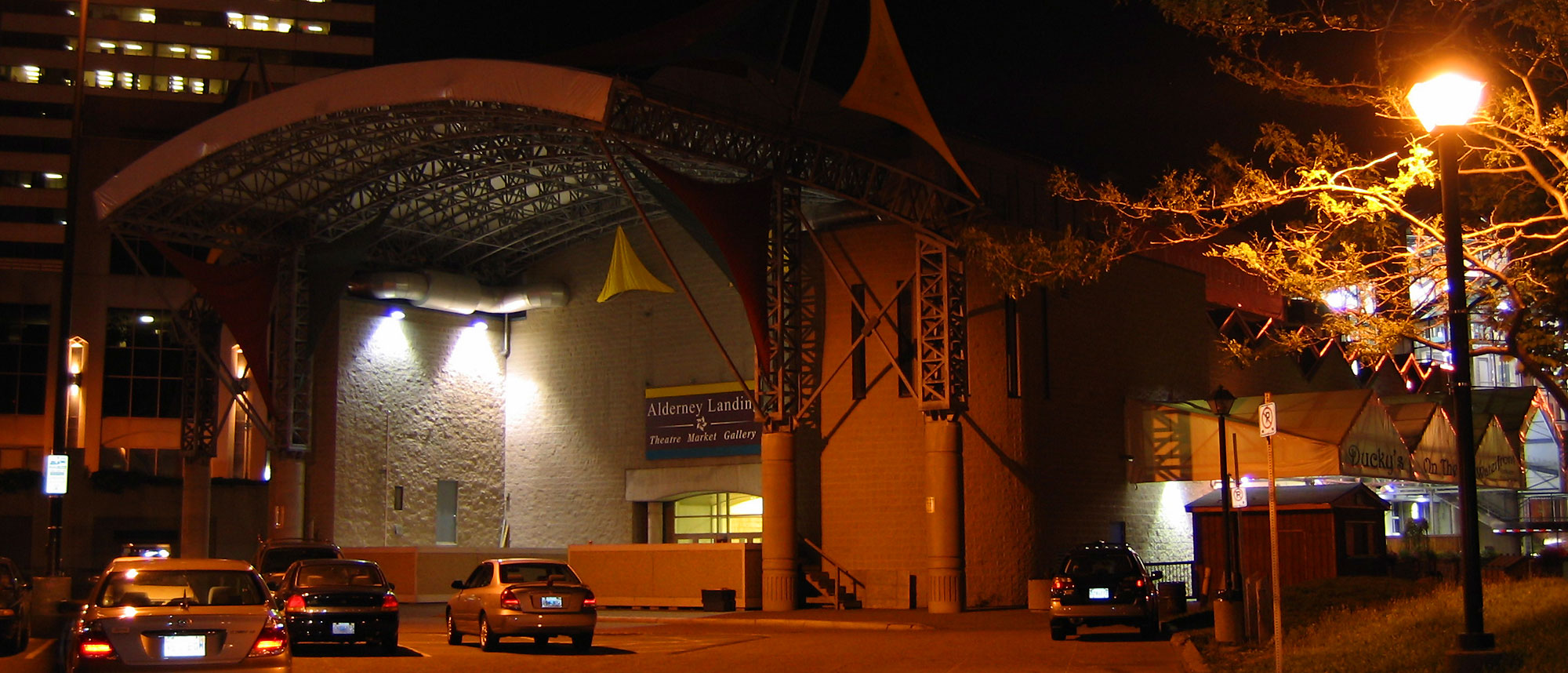
Alderney Landing

Total Population, 2006 Census: 14,764
Candidate	Votes	%	±
Gloria McCluskey - Acclaimed	0	0	

2004 Election - Gloria McCluskey 3,217 (54.13%); John M. Cunningham 1,546 (26.01%); Peter Majeau 1,180 (19.86%) - Voter turnout: 50.51%

== District 6: Dartmouth East - The Lakes ==
Total Population, 2006 Census: 16,642
Candidate	Votes	%	±
Andrew Younger - Acclaimed	0	0	

2004 Election - Andrew Younger 3,263 (51.74%); Brian Warshick 2,748 (43.58%); Henry (Hank) J. White 295 (4.68%) - Voter Turnout: 52.19%

== District 7: Portland - East Woodlawn ==
Portland Estates Elementary School

Total Population, 2006 Census: 17,448
Candidate	Votes	%	±
Bill Karsten - Acclaimed	0	0	

2004 Election - Bill Karsten 1,656 (25.89%); Emmett Austin 1,533 (23.96%); Monique Smith 1,505 (23.53%); Norman Wiechert 1,243 (19.43%); John L. MacDougall 460 (7.19%) - Voter Turnout: 54.05%

== District 8: Woodside - Eastern Passage ==
Total Population, 2006 Census: 17,523
Candidate	Votes	%	±
Jackie Barkhouse - (Incumbent)	2450	56.62%	
Christa Webber	1772	40.95%	
Calland Wells	105	2.43%	
Turnout	4327	35.95%	

2007 By-election - Jackie Barkhouse 48.31; Brian Birt 25.12; David F Boyd 2; Beverley Skaalrud-Woodfield 24.58 2004 Election - Becky Kent 1,977 (39.53%); Bruce F. Hetherington 1,359 (27.17%); Maurice Henneberry 1,049 (20.98%); Steven Michael Barkhouse 616 (12.32%) - Voter Turnout: 42.95%

== District 9: Albro Lake - Harbourview ==
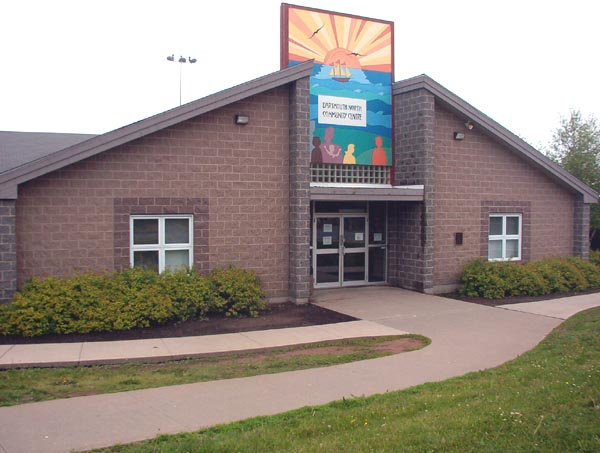
Dartmouth North Community Centre

Total Population, 2006 Census: 15,829
Candidate	Votes	%	±
Jim Smith - (Incumbent)	1799	60.65%	
Brian LeBlanc	1003	33.82%	
Wayne Sitland	164	5.53%	
Turnout	2966	26.83%	

2004 Election - Jim Smith 2,421 (66.73%); Clint Schofield 1,207 (33.27%) - Voter turnout: 36.14%

== District 10: Clayton Park West ==
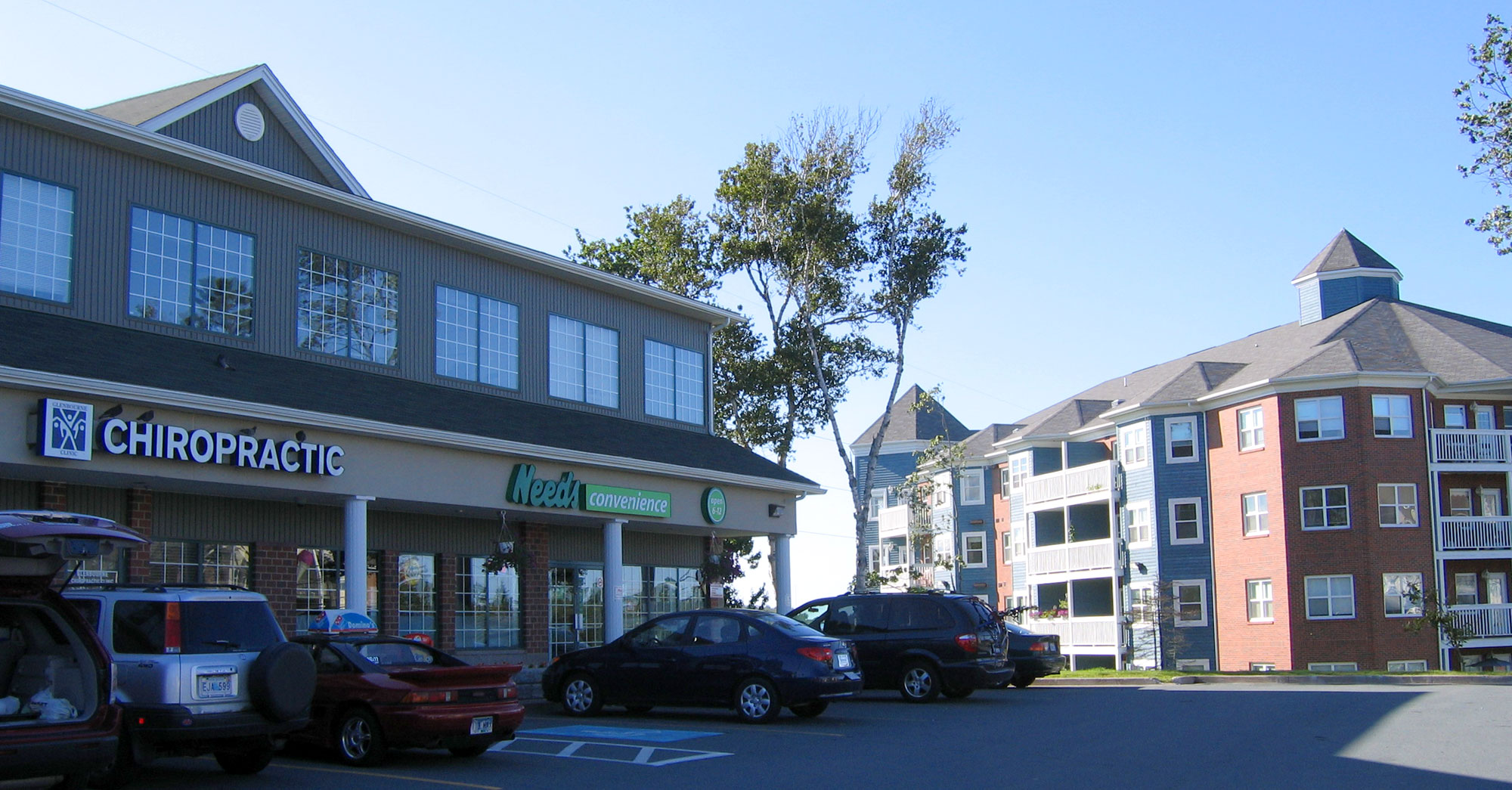
Clayton Park West

Total Population, 2006 Census: 14,829
Candidate	Votes	%	±
Mary Wile - (Incumbent)	1693	48.468%	
Jeff Campbell	950	27.197%	
Nancy Sievert	850	24.334%	
Turnout	3493	23.555%	

2004 Election - Mary Wile 1097 (27.28%); Jeff Campbell 987 (24.55%); David Salah 789 (19.62%); Christine Smith 594 (14.77%); Daniel Roukema 554 (13.78%) - Voter turnout: 42.18%

== District 11: Halifax North End ==
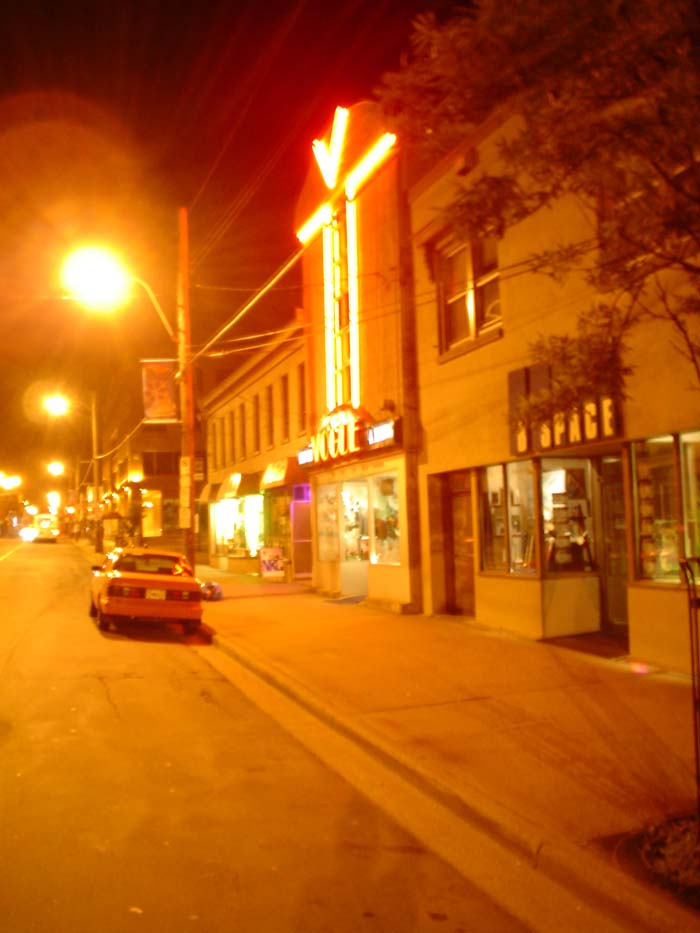
Göttingen Street

Total Population, 2006 Census: 14,893
Candidate	Votes	%	±
Jerry Blumenthal	2442	52.146%	
Patrick Murphy - (Incumbent)	2241	47.854%	
Turnout	4683	31.444%	

2004 Election - Patrick Murphy 1745 (35.15%); Eva Moore 1457 (29.35%); Debbie Kelly 603 (12.15%); Jocelyn Yerxa 556 (11.20%); Pat Pottie 381 (7.68%); Michael White 112 (2.26%); Michael Parsons 110 (2.22%) - Voter Turnout: 45.83%

== District 12: Halifax Downtown ==
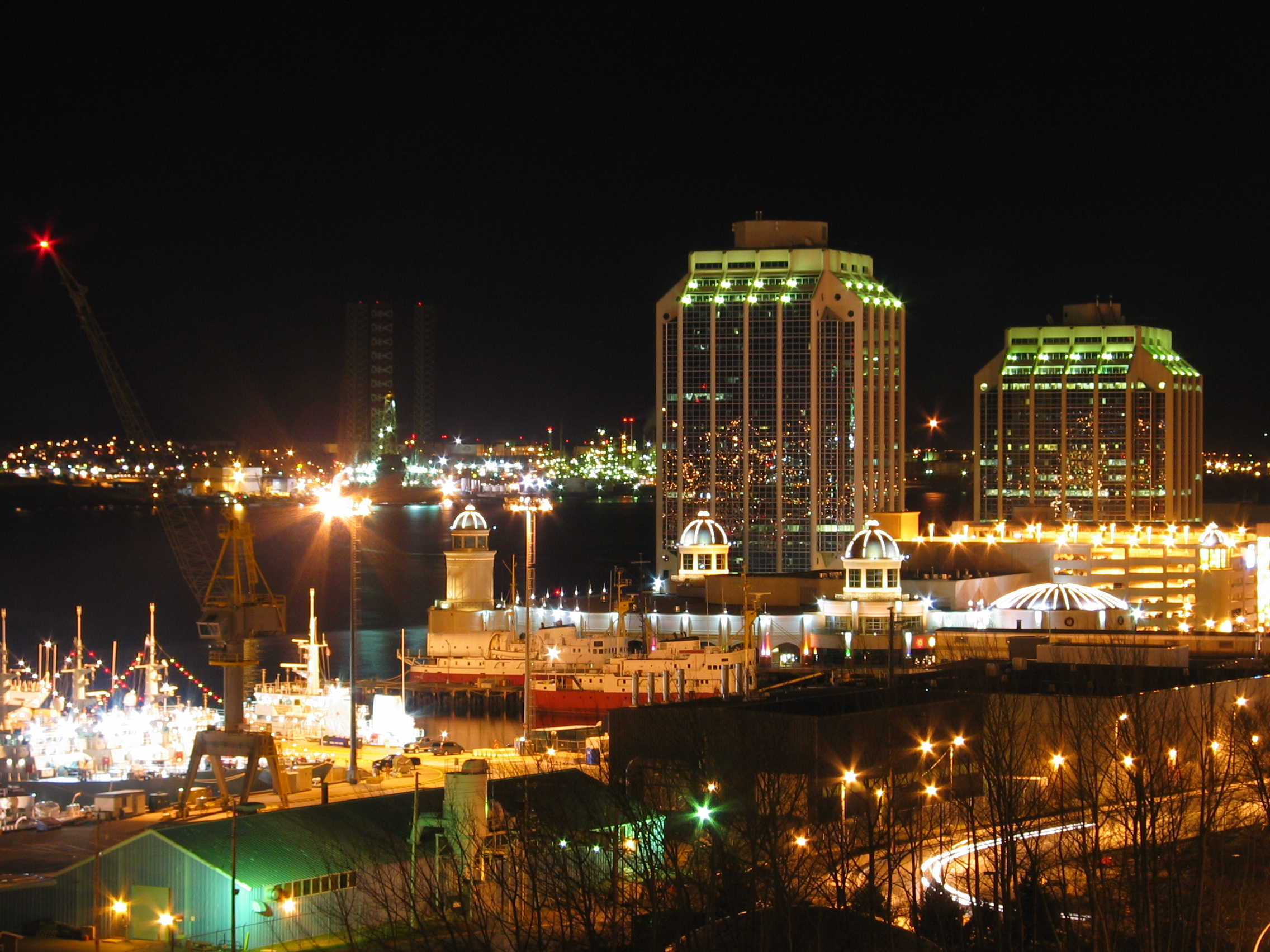
Halifax at night

Total Population, 2006 Census: 14,420
Candidate	Votes	%	±
Dawn Marie Sloane - (Incumbent)	1144	39.750%	
James Stuewe	996	34.607%	
Jerome Downey	663	23.037%	
Cameron Ells	75	2.606%	
Turnout	2878	19.958%	

2004 Election - Dawn Marie Sloane 1586 (51.78%); Irvine Carvery 717 (23.41%); Caley MacLennan 439 (14.33%); Mark Daye 321 (10.48%) - Voter Turnout: 35.83%

== District 13: Northwest Arm - South End and Sable Island ==
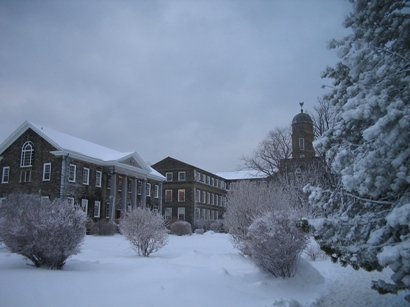
Dalhousie University

Total Population, 2006 Census: 14,867
Candidate	Votes	%	±
Sue Uteck - (Incumbent)	2505	59.842%	
Beverly W. Miller	1681	40.158%	
Turnout	4186	28.156%	

2004 Election - Sue Uteck 3141 (62.45%); Beverly Miller 1636 (32.52%); John Davis 253 (5.03%) - Voter turnout: 47.03%

== District 14: Connaught - Quinpool ==
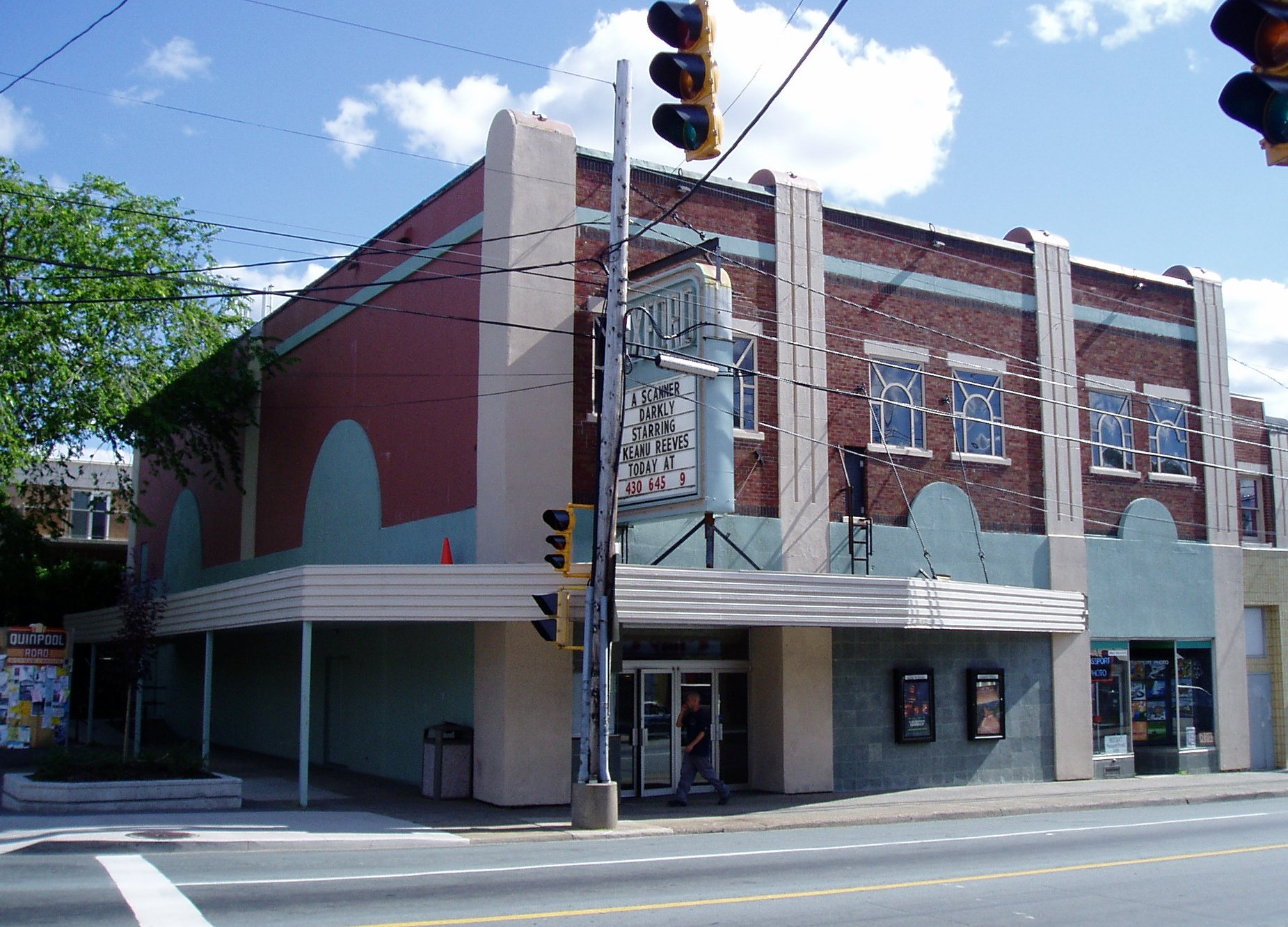
Oxford Theatre on Quinpool

Total Population, 2006 Census: 13,845
Candidate	Votes	%	±
Jennifer Watts	1519	32.046%	
Glenn Dodge	1125	23.734%	
Ross McLaren	647	13.650%	
Bill Forbes	607	12.806%	
Andrea Hilchie-Pye	455	9.599%	
Sean Phillips	256	5.401%	
Katie Campbell	131	2.764%	
Turnout	4740	34.236%	

2004 Election - Sheila Fougere 3894 (81.01%); Stephen Parsons 777 (16.16%); Alexander Sang Lam 136 (2.83%) - Voter Turnout: 46.50%

== District 15: Fairview - Clayton Park ==
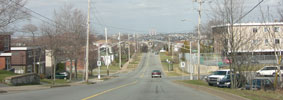
Main Ave., Fairview

Total Population, 2006 Census: 13,382
Candidate	Votes	%	±
Russell Walker - Acclaimed	0	0	

2004 Election - Russell Walker 2953 (69.17%); Nathaniel Smith 1316 (30.83%) - Voter Turnout: 43.52%

== District 16: Rockingham - Wentworth ==
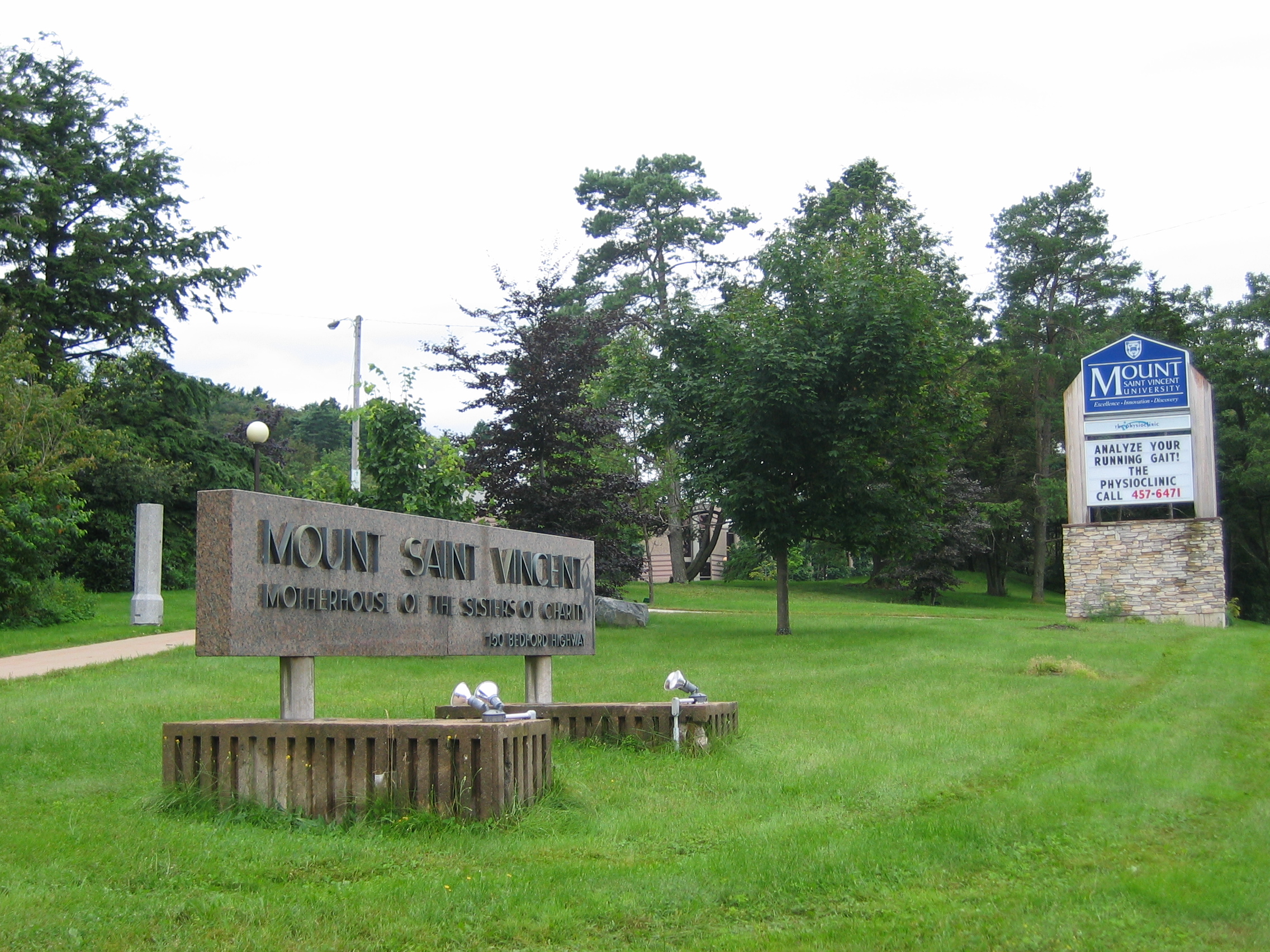
Mount Saint Vincent

Total Population, 2006 Census: 14,202
Candidate	Votes	%	±
Debbie Hum - (Incumbent)	2942	74.255%	
Norman Duncan	1020	25.745%	
Turnout	3962	27.897%	

2003 By-Election - Debbie Hum 65.53%; Mary Wile 34.39%

== District 17: Purcell's Cove - Armdale ==
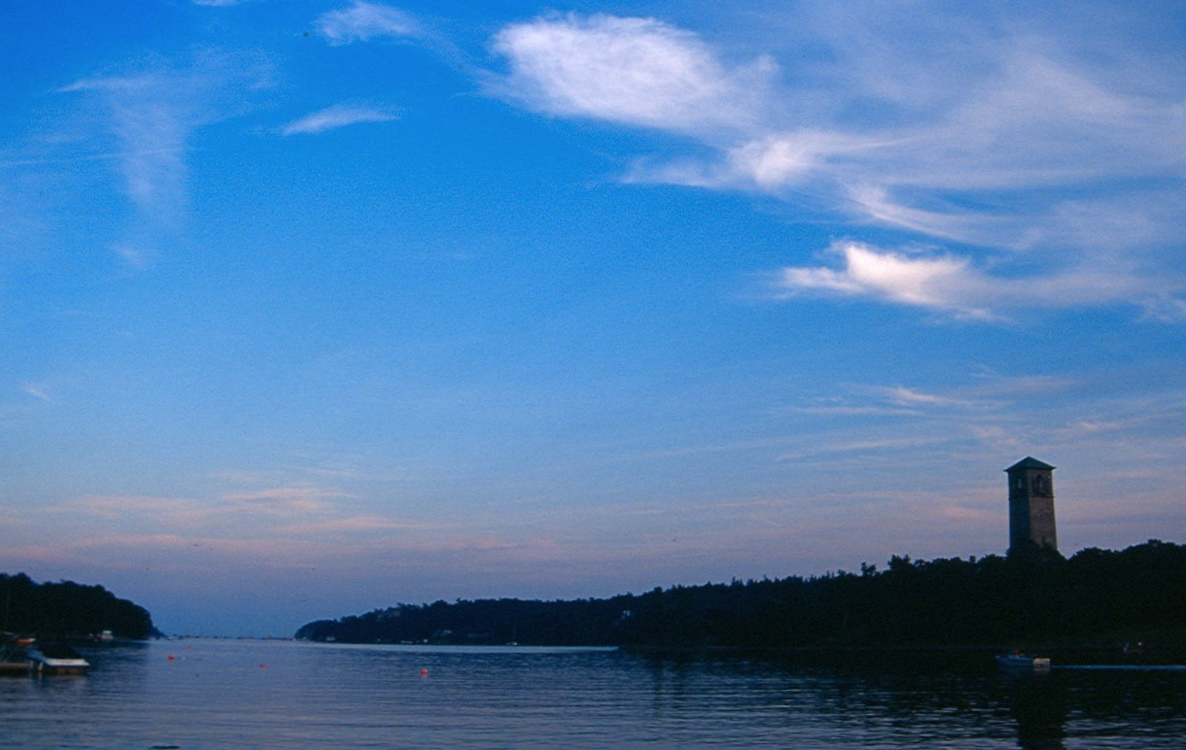
Northwest Arm

Total Population, 2006 Census: 14,527
Candidate	Votes	%	±
Linda Mosher - (Incumbent)	0	0	
Jim Connolly	0	0	
Turnout	0	0	

2004 Election - Linda Mosher 3545 (68.32%); Graham Read 1087 (20.95%); Bill Meagher 557 (10.73%) - Voter turnout: 53.08%

== District 18: Spryfield - Herring Cove ==
Total Population, 2006 Census: 15,165
Candidate	Votes	%	±
Steve Adams - Deputy Mayor - (Incumbent)	2863	75.741%	
David Sampson	917	24.259%	
Turnout	3780	24.926%	

2004 Election - Steve Adams 3164 (62.47%); Bruce Cooke 1005 (19.84%); Jerry MacKinlay 612 (12.08%); Charlie Reardon 284 (5.61%) - Voter Turnout: 46.13%

== District 19: Sackville - Lucasville ==
Total Population, 2006 Census: 17,657
Candidate	Votes	%	±
Brad Johns - (Incumbent)	3309	84.156%	
Tim Hosford	623	15.844%	
Turnout	3932	22.269%	

2004 Election - Brad 'BJ' Johns 4028 (70.33); Raymond Smardon 827 (14.44%); Phil Syms 620 (10.83%); John Ferguson 252 (4.40%) - Voter turnout: 49.05%

== District 20: Lower Sackville ==
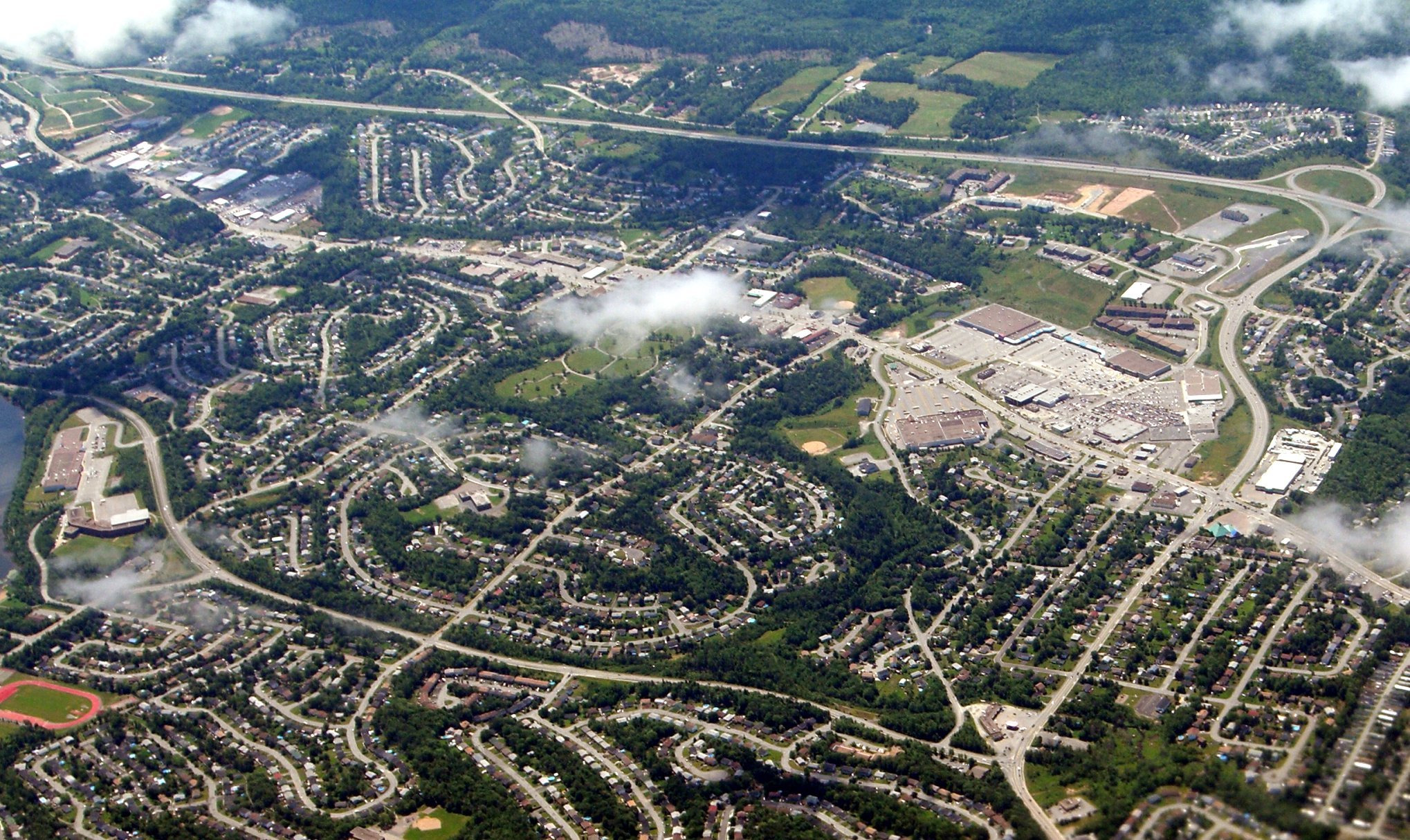
Lower Sackville

Total Population, 2006 Census: 16,126
Candidate	Votes	%	±
Bob Harvey - (Incumbent)	2750	68.019%	
Bruce DeVenne	1293	31.981%	
Turnout	4043	25.071%	

2004 Election - Bob Harvey 3089 (54.23%); George A Hoskins 1613 (28.32%); Steve Blackmore 994 (17.45%) - Voter turnout: 48.85

== District 21: Bedford ==
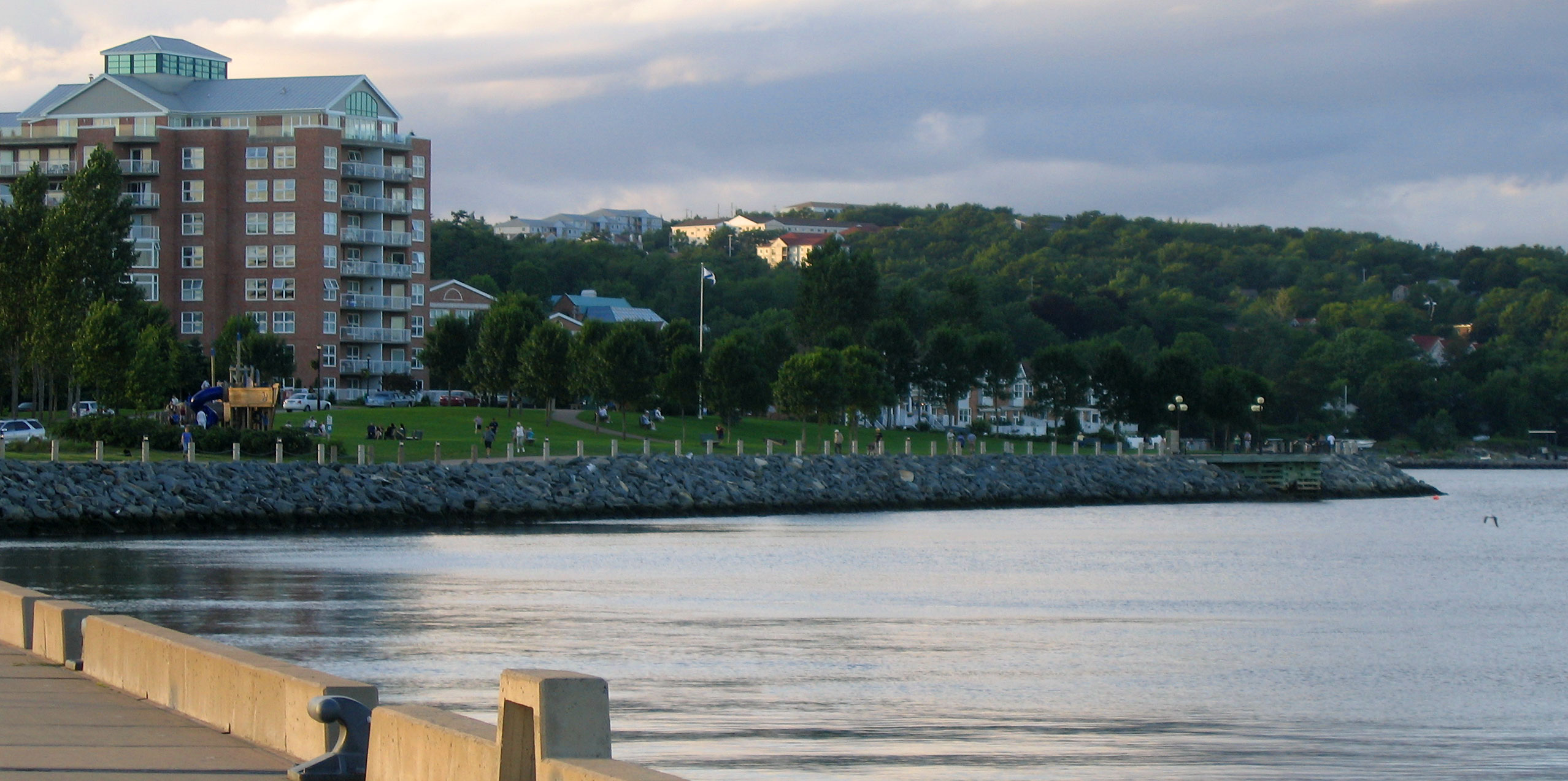
Bedford waterfront

Total Population, 2006 Census: 16,780
Candidate	Votes	%	±
Tim Outhit	3780	66.397%	
Matthew Christie	1913	33.603%	
Turnout	5693	33.927%	

2006 By-election - Gary Martin 56.07; Ed McHugh 43.93

== District 22: Timberlea - Prospect ==
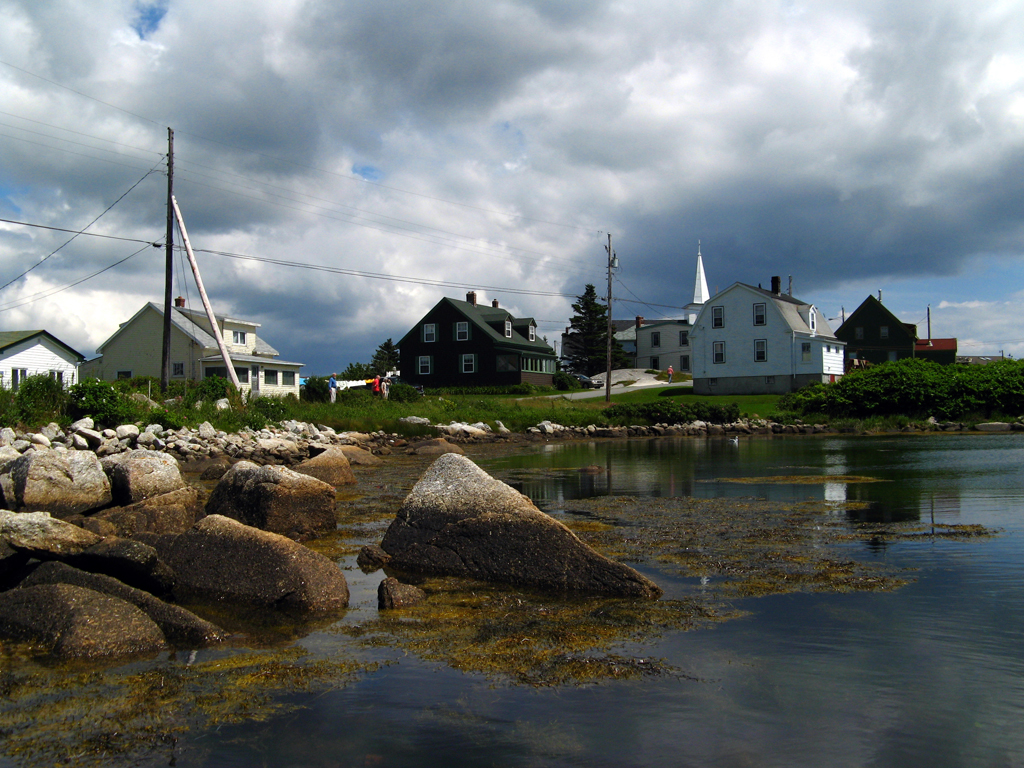
Prospect

Total Population, 2006 Census: 19,377
Candidate	Votes	%	±
Reg Rankin - (Incumbent)	2838	52.102%	
John A. Stoddard	1359	24.950%	
Shawn Lahey	1250	22.948%	
Turnout	5447	28.111%	

2004 Election - Reg Rankin 2038 (28.5%); Barb Allen 1999 (27.96%); Jack Mitchell 1426 (19.94%); Gary Sampson 732 (10.24%); Kathy Melanson 591 (8.27%); Lisa Mullin 201 (2.81%); Dennis Kirby 163 (2.28%) - Voter Turnout: 54.89%

== District 23: Hammonds Plains - St. Margaret's ==
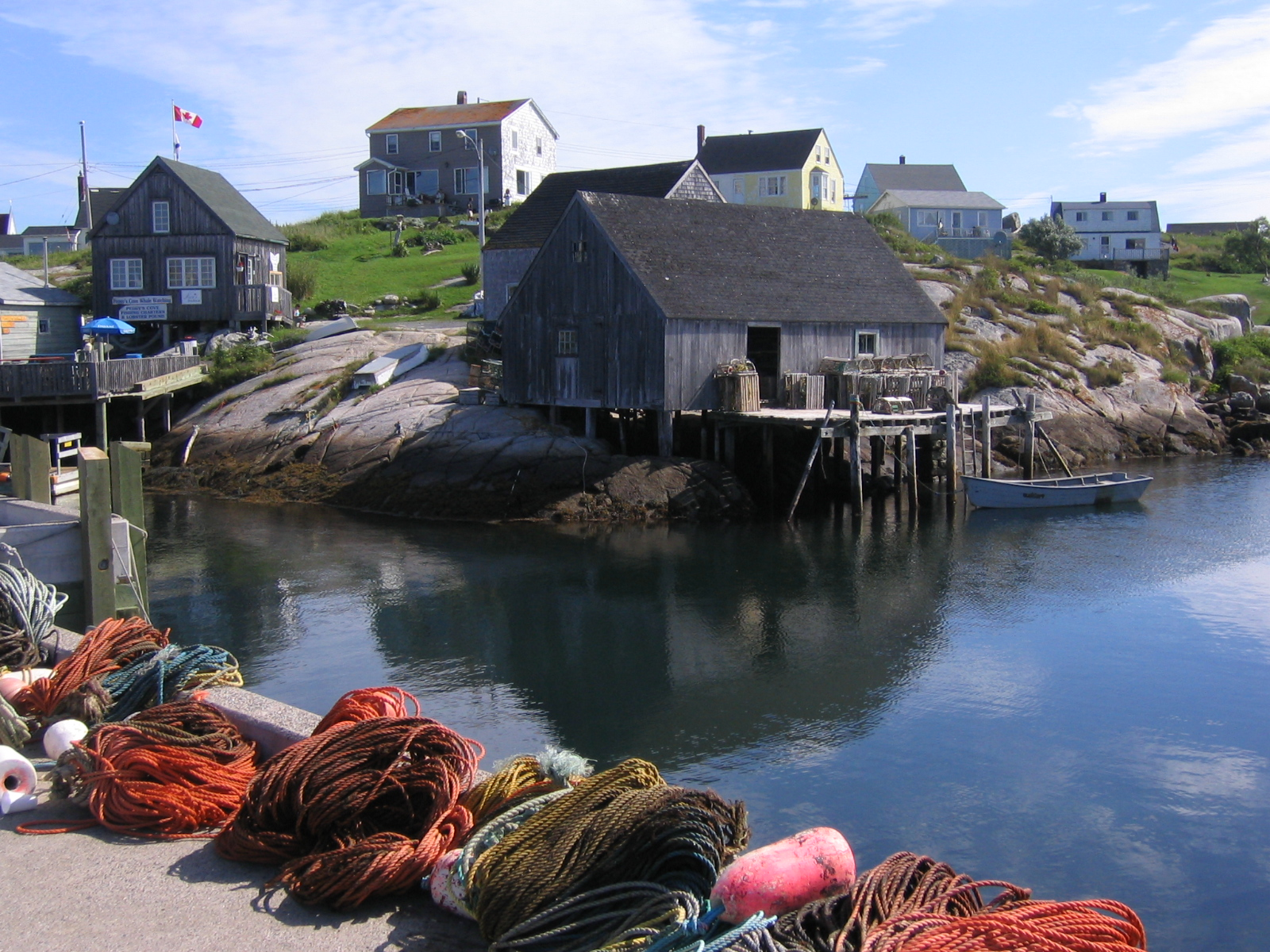
Peggy's Cove

Total Population, 2006 Census: 19,627
Candidate	Votes	%	±
Peter Lund	1580	30.373%	
Doug Poulton	1538	29.566%	
Gina Byrne	1521	29.239%	
Deborah Brunt	563	10.823%	
Turnout	5202	26.504%	

2004 Election - Gary Meade 2984 (47.68%); Byron Kennedy 1177 (18.8%); Mike Marriott 650 (10.39%); Bill Woodwort 629 (10.05%); Kevin Hubley 535 (8.55%); John Profit 284 (4.54%) - Voter Turnout: 54.73%
