= Marie Dechman =

Canadian politician

The Honourable Marie P. Dechman ECNS

MLA for Lunenburg West
- In office 1988–1993
- Preceded by: Mel Pickings
- Succeeded by: Don Downe

Personal details
- Born: 1941 (age 84–85)
- Party: Progressive Conservative

Marie P. Dechman is a Canadian politician. She represented the electoral district of Lunenburg West in the Nova Scotia House of Assembly from 1988 to 1993. She was a member of the Progressive Conservative Party of Nova Scotia.

== Political career ==
Dechman entered provincial politics in the 1988 election, winning the Lunenburg West riding by 268 votes. In 1989, she was elected Nova Scotia's first woman Deputy Speaker. In February 1991, Dechman was appointed to the Executive Council of Nova Scotia as Minister of Community Services. On February 17, 1992, she was shuffled to Minister of Counsumer Affairs, and Minister responsible for Housing, which were later merged into one position, Minister of Housing and Consumer Affairs. In the 1993 election, Dechman was defeated by Liberal Don Downe.
