= Maurice DeLory =

Canadian politician

The Honourable Maurice DeLory ECNS
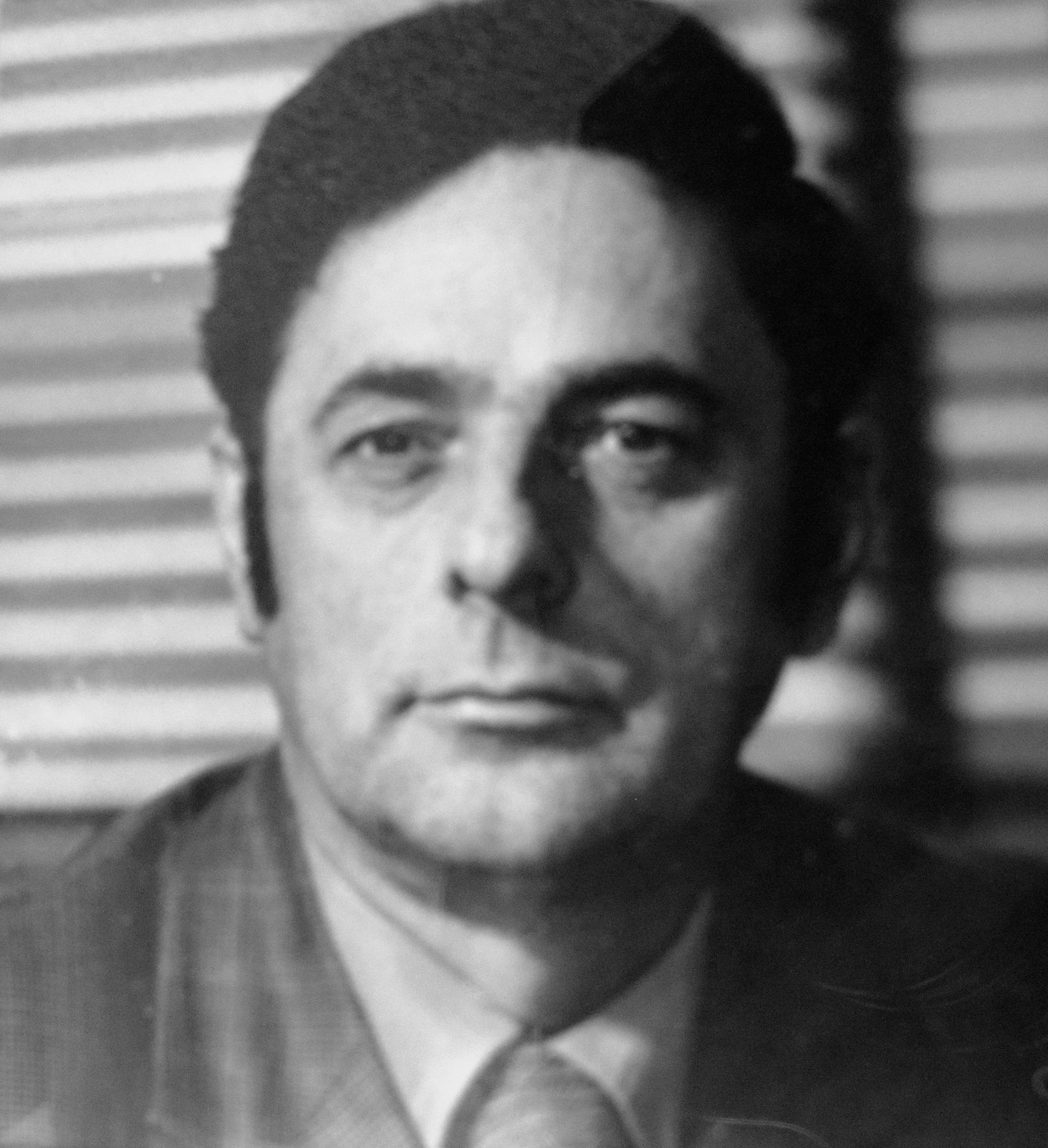
- DeLory, c. 1973

MLA for Lunenburg West
- In office 1970–1978
- Preceded by: Harley J. Spence
- Succeeded by: Mel Pickings

Personal details
- Born: October 5, 1927 Georgetown, Prince Edward Island
- Died: March 31, 2016 (aged 88) Bridgewater, Nova Scotia
- Party: Liberal
- Occupation: Doctor

Maurice E. "Mike" DeLory (October 5, 1927 – March 31, 2016) was a Canadian politician. He represented the electoral district of Lunenburg West in the Nova Scotia House of Assembly from 1970 to 1978. He was a member of the Nova Scotia Liberal Party.

DeLory was born in Georgetown, Prince Edward Island. He attended Prince of Wales College and Dalhousie University, earning B.Sc., M.D. and C.M. degrees. He was a surgeon. In 1955, he married Burdette MacInnis. He served in the Executive Council of Nova Scotia as Provincial Secretary, Minister of Lands and Forests, and Minister of Tourism.
