= Mel Pickings =

Canadian politician (1926–2019)

The Honourable Mel Pickings ECNS

MLA for Lunenburg West
- In office 1978–1988
- Preceded by: Maurice DeLory
- Succeeded by: Marie Dechman

Personal details
- Born: August 19, 1926 Halifax, Nova Scotia
- Died: February 1, 2019 (aged 92)
- Party: Progressive Conservative

Milne Charles "Mel" Pickings (August 19, 1926 – February 1, 2019) was a Canadian politician. He represented the electoral district of Lunenburg West in the Nova Scotia House of Assembly from 1978 to 1988. He was a member of the Progressive Conservative Party of Nova Scotia.

Born in Halifax, Nova Scotia, in 1926 Pickings entered provincial politics in the 1978 election, defeating Liberal incumbent Maurice DeLory by 1116 votes in the Lunenburg West riding. He was re-elected in the 1981 election. On November 9, 1983, Pickings was appointed to the Executive Council of Nova Scotia as Minister responsible for the Emergency Measures Organization, and Minister responsible for the Purchasing Act. He was re-elected in the 1984 election. In November 1985, Pickings was named Minister of Housing. On July 21, 1988, Pickings resigned from cabinet and announced he was not running in the next election.

Pickings died on February 1, 2019.
