= Mark Eyking =

Canadian politician (born 1960)

The Honourable Mark Eyking PC
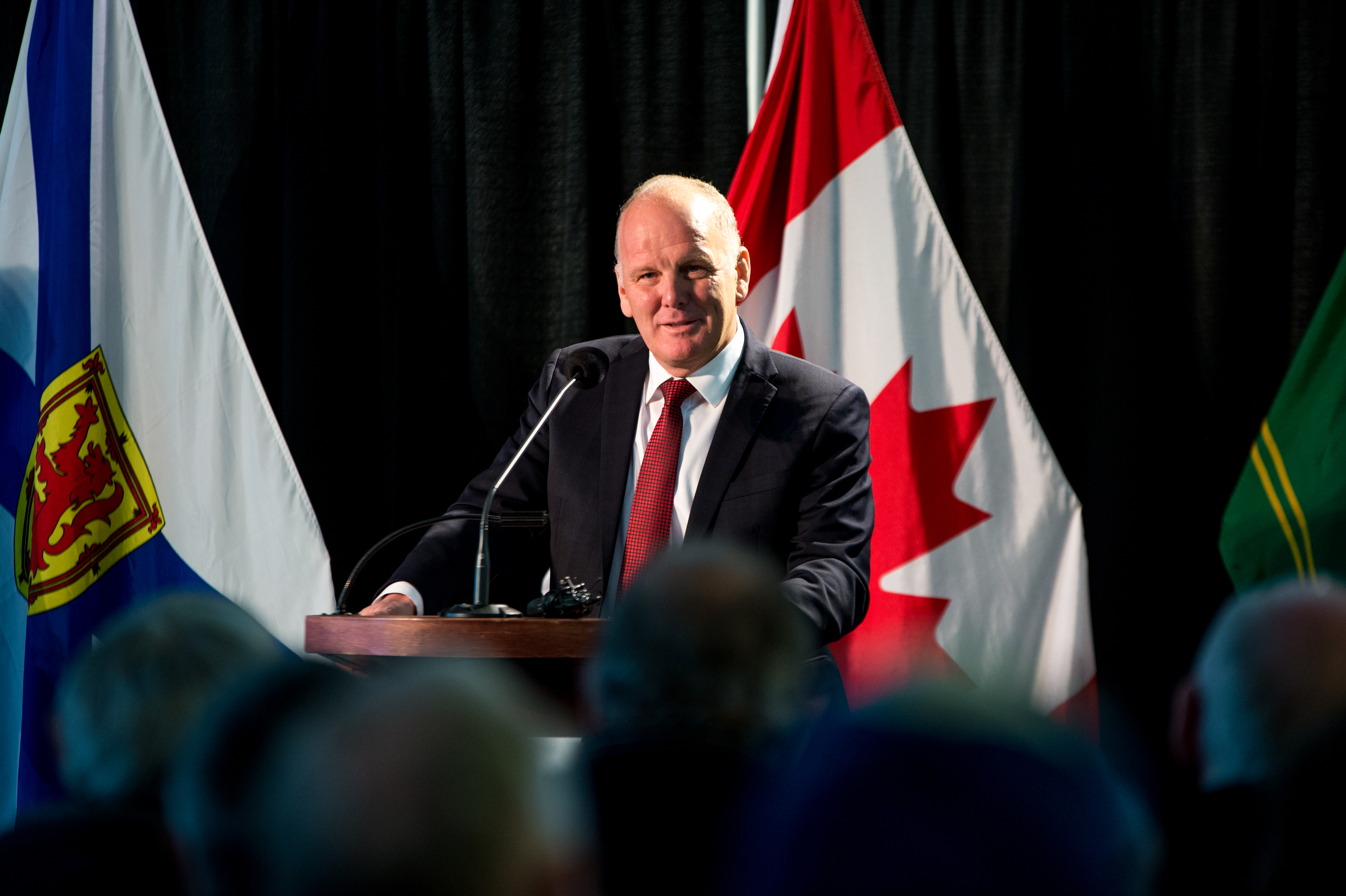
- Mark Eyking in 2017

Chairman of the Standing Committee on International Trade
- In office February 4, 2016 – September 11, 2019
- Preceded by: Randy Hoback
- Succeeded by: Judy Sgro

Member of Parliament for Sydney—Victoria
- In office November 27, 2000 – September 11, 2019
- Preceded by: Peter Mancini
- Succeeded by: Jaime Battiste

Personal details
- Born: August 30, 1960 (age 66) Sydney, Nova Scotia, Canada
- Party: Liberal
- Spouse: Pam Eyking
- Profession: Businessman, Farmer

Mark Eyking PC (born August 30, 1960) is a Canadian politician who served as the Member of Parliament for the riding of Sydney—Victoria from 2000 to 2019 as a member of the Liberal Party.

== Early life and education ==
Eyking was born in Sydney, Nova Scotia. His parents, born in Beverwijk (father) and Moergestel (mother), emigrated from the Netherlands to Canada in 1952. Not being able to travel to their city of preference Vancouver due to a lack of funds, they chose to start a business in olericulture in Sydney, where Eyking was born eight years later. Eyking was educated at the Nova Scotia Agricultural College, where he obtained his Agriculture Business Diploma. Now a resident of Millville Boularderie, Eyking is a farmer by career.

== Political career ==
On October 29, 2000, Eyking won the Liberal nomination in the Sydney—Victoria riding for the 2000 federal election. On November 27, 2000, he defeated New Democrat incumbent Peter Mancini by over 5,000 votes to win a seat in the House of Commons. Eyking was re-elected in the 2004, 2006, 2008, 2011, and 2015 federal elections. In Paul Martin's government, he served as the Parliamentary Secretary to the Minister of Agriculture and Agri-Food with special emphasis on Agri-Food (2003–2004) and Parliamentary Secretary to the Minister of International Trade with special emphasis on Emerging Markets (2004–2006).

He served as the chair of the Standing Committee on International Trade during the 42nd Canadian Parliament. Eyking announced on February 13, 2019 that he wouldn't run for re-election in 2019.

== Personal life ==
His wife Pam represented the riding of Victoria-The Lakes as a Liberal MLA in the Nova Scotia House of Assembly from 2013 to 2017.

== Electoral record ==
2015 Canadian federal election: Sydney—Victoria
Party	Candidate	Votes	%	±%	Expenditures
Liberal	Mark Eyking	29,995	73.20	+33.29	–
New Democratic	Monika Dutt	5,351	13.06	–5.97	$32,027.50
Conservative	John Douglas Chiasson	4,360	10.64	–27.21	$41,720.11
Green	Matthew Cavanaugh	1,026	2.50	–0.71	–
Libertarian	Wayne James Hiscock	242	0.59	–	–
Total valid votes/expense limit		40,974	100.00		$195,473.50
Total rejected ballots		236	0.57		
Turnout		41,210	68.96		
Eligible voters		59,761			
Liberal hold		Swing		+19.63	
Source: Elections Canada

2011 Canadian federal election: Sydney—Victoria
Party	Candidate	Votes	%	±%	Expenditures
Liberal	Mark Eyking	14,788	39.91	-9.49	$67,454.53
Conservative	Cecil Clarke	14,023	37.85	+17.23	$77,334.98
New Democratic	Kathy MacLeod	7,049	19.02	-5.42	$17,238.77
Green	Chris Milburn	1,191	3.21	-2.33	$0.00
Total valid votes/expense limit		37,051	100.0		$80,666.28
Total rejected, unmarked and declined ballots		279	0.75	+0.03	
Turnout		37,330	61.48	+4.07	
Eligible voters		60,719			
Liberal hold		Swing		-13.36	

2008 Canadian federal election: Sydney—Victoria
Party	Candidate	Votes	%	±%	Expenditures
Liberal	Mark Eyking	17,303	49.40	-0.48	$60,561.52
New Democratic	Wayne McKay	8,559	24.44	-4.06	$15,485.05
Conservative	Kristen Rudderham	7,223	20.62	+2.28	$60,092.18
Green	Collin Harker	1,941	5.54	+2.25	$1,966.54
Total valid votes/expense limit		35,026	100.0		$78,337
Total rejected, unmarked and declined ballots		254	0.72	+0.16	
Turnout		35,280	57.41	-5.89	
Eligible voters		61,448			
Liberal hold		Swing		+1.79	

2006 Canadian federal election: Sydney—Victoria
Party	Candidate	Votes	%	±%	Expenditures
Liberal	Mark Eyking	20,277	49.88	-2.25	$47,473.95
New Democratic	John Hugh Edwards	11,587	28.50	+0.79	$28,987.58
Conservative	Howie MacDonald	7,455	18.34	+2.47	$26,033.71
Green	Chris Milburn	1,336	3.29	+0.99	$537.60
Total valid votes/expense limit		40,655	100.0		$73,953
Total rejected, unmarked and declined ballots		227	0.56	-0.23	
Turnout		40,882	63.30	+2.72	
Eligible voters		64,589			
Liberal hold		Swing		-1.52	

2004 Canadian federal election: Sydney—Victoria
Party	Candidate	Votes	%	±%	Expenditures
Liberal	Mark Eyking	19,372	52.13	+2.14	$51,343.95
New Democratic	John Hugh Edwards	10,298	27.71	-8.50	$24,957.69
Conservative	Howie MacDonald	5,897	15.87	+2.08	$48,515.46
Green	Chris Milburn	855	2.30	–	$580.41
Marijuana	Cathy Thériault	474	1.28	–	none listed
Independent	B. Chris Gallant	264	0.71	–	$165.54
Total valid votes/expense limit		37,160	100.0		$71,187
Total rejected, unmarked and declined ballots		297	0.79		
Turnout		37,457	60.58		
Eligible voters		61,826			
Liberal notional hold		Swing		+5.32	
Changes from 2000 are based on redistributed results. Conservative Party change is based on the combination of Canadian Alliance and Progressive Conservative Party totals.

2000 Canadian federal election: Sydney—Victoria
Party	Candidate	Votes	%	±%
Liberal	Mark Eyking	19,388	49.8	+23.5
New Democratic	Peter Mancini	14,216	36.5	-14.6
Progressive Conservative	Anna Curtis-Steele	3,779	9.7	-12.9
Alliance	Rod A.M. Farrell	1,528	3.9	
Total valid votes		38,911	100.0	
