= Carolyn Bolivar-Getson =

Canadian politician

The Honourable Carolyn Bolivar-Getson ECNS

Mayor of the Municipality of the District of Lunenburg
- In office November 1, 2016 – November 2024
- Preceded by: Don Downe
- Succeeded by: Elspeth McLean-Wile

Member of the Nova Scotia House of Assembly for Lunenburg West
- In office August 5, 2003 – June 9, 2009
- Preceded by: Don Downe
- Succeeded by: Gary Ramey

Personal details
- Born: February 10, 1964 (age 62) Bridgewater, Nova Scotia
- Party: Progressive Conservative
- Occupation: shopkeeper

Carolyn Bolivar-Getson (born February 10, 1964) is a Canadian politician. She represented the electoral district of Lunenburg West in the Nova Scotia House of Assembly from 2003 to 2009 as a member of the Progressive Conservatives. Bolivar-Getson was sworn in on November 1, replacing Don Downe. after being elected in the 2016 municipal election. She was re-elected in the 2020 municipal election. She lost her seat in the 2024 municipal election.

== Biography ==
Born in 1964 in Bridgewater, Nova Scotia, Bolivar-Getson graduated from Saint Mary's University with a Bachelor of Commerce degree. She owned and operated a general store in Newcombville. In 1997, she was elected as a municipal councillor in Lunenburg County.

Bolivar-Getson entered provincial politics in the 2003 election, winning the Lunenburg West riding. In August 2003, she was appointed to the Executive Council of Nova Scotia as Minister of Human Resources, Minister responsible for the Public Service Commission, and Minister responsible for the Advisory Council on the Status of Women Act. When Rodney MacDonald took over as premier in February 2006, he named Bolivar-Getson as Minister of Environment and Labour.

Following her re-election in 2006, Bolivar-Getson was shuffled to Minister of Immigration. She was given an additional role in cabinet in September 2007 when she was named the first Minister of Seniors. In October 2007, Bolivar-Getson was dropped as Minister of Immigration, retaining roles in cabinet as Minister of Human Resources, Minister of Seniors, and Minister of Emergency Management. In January 2009, Bolivar-Getson was named Minister of Natural Resources. In the 2009 election, Bolivar-Getson was defeated by New Democrat Gary Ramey.

In 2012, Bolivar-Getson returned to municipal politics, winning a council seat in the Municipality of the District of Lunenburg.

In April 2016, Bolivar-Getson announced she would run for mayor of the Municipality of the District of Lunenburg in the 2016 municipal election. On October 15, Bolivar-Getson was elected mayor, defeating Tom Lockwood by 154 votes. Bolivar-Getson was sworn in on November 1, replacing Don Downe. She was re-elected in the 2020 municipal election. She lost her seat in the 2024 municipal election.
