= Howie MacDonald =

Canadian fiddler and entertainer

Howie MacDonald (born March 9, 1965) is a Canadian fiddler, pianist and entertainer from Westmount, Cape Breton Island. His lively Cape Breton style of fiddling has entertained audiences all over the world while travelling with The Rankin Family. He has released multiple albums including one with Ashley MacIsaac, capebretonfiddlemusicNOTCALM in 2001.

MacDonald was the Conservative Party of Canada candidate for Sydney—Victoria in the 2004 and 2006 federal elections.

== Electoral record ==
2006 Canadian federal election: Sydney—Victoria
Party	Candidate	Votes	%	±%	Expenditures
Liberal	Mark Eyking	20,277	49.88	-2.25	$47,473.95
New Democratic	John Hugh Edwards	11,587	28.50	+0.79	$28,987.58
Conservative	Howie MacDonald	7,455	18.34	+2.47	$26,033.71
Green	Chris Milburn	1,336	3.29	+0.99	$537.60
Total valid votes/expense limit		40,655	100.0		$73,953
Total rejected, unmarked and declined ballots		227	0.56	-0.23	
Turnout		40,882	63.30	+2.72	
Eligible voters		64,589			
Liberal hold		Swing		-1.52	

2004 Canadian federal election: Sydney—Victoria
Party	Candidate	Votes	%	±%	Expenditures
Liberal	Mark Eyking	19,372	52.13	+2.14	$51,343.95
New Democratic	John Hugh Edwards	10,298	27.71	-8.50	$24,957.69
Conservative	Howie MacDonald	5,897	15.87	+2.08	$48,515.46
Green	Chris Milburn	855	2.30	–	$580.41
Marijuana	Cathy Thériault	474	1.28	–	none listed
Independent	B. Chris Gallant	264	0.71	–	$165.54
Total valid votes/expense limit		37,160	100.0		$71,187
Total rejected, unmarked and declined ballots		297	0.79		
Turnout		37,457	60.58		
Eligible voters		61,826			
Liberal notional hold		Swing		+5.32	
Changes from 2000 are based on redistributed results. Conservative Party change is based on the combination of Canadian Alliance and Progressive Conservative Party totals.
