= Amanda McDougall =

Canadian politician

Mayor of Cape Breton Regional Municipality
- In office November 5, 2020 – October 30, 2024
- Preceded by: Cecil Clarke
- Succeeded by: Cecil Clarke

Personal details
- Born: Main-a-Dieu, Nova Scotia, Canada
- Occupation: Politician

Amanda McDougall is a politician in Nova Scotia, Canada who served as mayor of the Cape Breton Regional Municipality from 2020 to 2024. She became the first woman elected mayor of the Cape Breton Regional Municipality on October 17, 2020 and was sworn in on November 5, 2020. Before being elected mayor, she served as a councillor in District 8 in 2016, and was the executive director of the nonprofit environmental organization ACAP Cape Breton. McDougall chose not to reoffer in the 2024 CBRM Municipal Election.
