= Don Downe =

Canadian politician (born 1951)

The Honourable Don Downe ECNS

MLA for Lunenburg West
- In office May 25, 1993 – February 18, 2003
- Preceded by: Marie Dechman
- Succeeded by: Carolyn Bolivar-Getson

Minister of Finance
- In office April 8, 1998 – August 16, 1999
- Preceded by: Bill Gillis
- Succeeded by: Neil LeBlanc

Personal details
- Born: 1951 (age 74–75) Charlottetown, Prince Edward Island
- Party: Liberal

Donald Richard Downe (born 1951) is a farmer and political figure in Nova Scotia, Canada. He represented Lunenburg West in the Nova Scotia House of Assembly from 1993 to 2003 as a Liberal member. Dowe was also the first mayor of the Municipality of the District of Lunenburg from 2012-2016.

== Early life ==
Downe was born in Charlottetown, Prince Edward Island. He was a poultry farm owner and was president of the Nova Scotia Federation of Agriculture.

== Political career ==
=== Provincial politics ===
In 1992, he ran for the leadership of the Nova Scotia Liberal Party, losing on the second ballot to John Savage.

In the 1993 election, Downe defeated Progressive Conservative cabinet minister Marie Dechman by almost 3,400 votes in Lunenburg West. On June 11, 1993, Downe was appointed to the Executive Council of Nova Scotia as Minister of Natural Resources. In March 1996, Downe was moved to Minister of Business and Consumer Services, but was shuffled again in June 1996, when he was named Minister of Transportation and Public Works. When Russell MacLellan was sworn-in as premier in July 1997, Downe remained as Minister of Transportation and Public Works.

Downe was re-elected in the 1998 election. On April 8, 1998, he was named Minister of Finance, Minister of Environment, Minister responsible for Aboriginal Affairs, and Deputy Premier. In December 1998, the Environment portfolio was transferred to Michel Samson. The Liberals lost government in the 1999 election, but Downe was re-elected by almost 1,000 votes in his riding. Considered a possible leadership candidate following MacLellan's resignation as leader, Downe declined to enter the race. On November 21, 2002, Downe announced that he would be not be running in the next provincial election, and officially resigned as MLA on February 18, 2003.

=== Municipal politics ===
In 2008, Downe returned to politics and was elected the first mayor of the Municipality of the District of Lunenburg. He was re-elected in 2012. Downe did not for re-election in the 2016 municipal election.
