= 2012 Nova Scotia municipal elections =

- October 20, 2012

Municipal elections were held across the Canadian province of Nova Scotia on October 20, 2012.

Selected mayoral races are as follows. Each town and regional municipality in the province held an election for mayor, while one county (Colchester) and one municipal district (Lunenburg) also held races for mayor.

== Amherst ==
Candidate	Vote	%
Rob Small (X)	1,589	53.72
Wayne Bishop	1,369	46.28

== Bridgewater ==
Candidate	Vote	%
David Walker	1,079	52.43
Gary Macneil	979	47.57

== Cape Breton Regional Municipality ==
Mayor

Candidate	Vote	%
Cecil Clarke	27,732	58.6
Rankin MacSween	17,847	37.7
Elizabeth Barrie	800	1.7
Glenn Jessome	660	1.4
Wilf Isaac	286	0.6

Council

Candidate	Vote	%
District 1
Clarence Prince (X)	3,344	78.2
Robert Hillman	692	16.2
Paul Power	242	5.7
District 2
Charlie Keagan	1,451	33.0
Lloyd Wilkie	1,276	29.0
Bill MacDonald	914	20.8
Beth Johnston	758	17.2
District 3
Mae Rowe (X)	2,306	63.7
Esmond (Blue) Marshall	1,315	36.3
District 4
Claire Detheridge (X)	2,459	56.0
Kenneth MacQueen	1,561	35.5
John Hashem	374	8.5
District 5
Eldon MacDonald	1,038	27.5
Jim "Rico" MacEachern	729	19.3
Charlie Long	693	18.4
Leah Boyd	347	9.2
Mike Targett	342	9.1
Max MacDonald	256	6.8
Doug Johnston	215	5.7
George Woodberry	151	4.0
District 6
Ray Paruch (X)	2,251	50.4
Tom Wilson (X)	1,915	42.9
Roberta (Robin) Lynch	297	6.7
District 7
Ivan Doncaster	2,282	61.9
Dave LeBlanc (X)	1,402	38.1
District 8
Kevin Saccary (X)	1,740	50.4
Hugh Kennedy	887	25.7
Amanda McDougall	527	15.3
Sandra Clarke	299	8.7
District 9
George MacDonald (X)	Acclaimed	
District 10
Darren Bruckschwaiger (X)	3,191	65.5
Lee McNeil (X)	938	19.2
Cecil Saccary	451	9.3
David MacKeigan	295	6.1
District 11
Lowell Cormier	Acclaimed	
District 12
Jim MacLeod (X)	1,447	41.7
Jason MacLean	1,063	30.6
Brandon Ellis	816	23.5
Tim Waler	147	4.2

== Colchester County ==
Candidate	Vote	%
Bob Taylor (X)	Acclaimed	

== Halifax Regional Municipality ==
Candidate	Vote	%
Mike Savage	63,547	57.7
Tom Martin	21,912	19.9
Fred Connors	20,277	18.4
Aaron Eisses	1,628	1.5
Steve Mackie	1,458	1.3
Robert (Wesley) McCormack	1,218	1.1

== Kentville ==
Candidate	Vote	%
David Corkum (X)	Acclaimed	

== Lunenburg (Town) ==
Candidate	Vote	%
Rachel Bailey	851	74.9
Ron Stockton	285	25.1

== District of the Municipality of Lunenburg ==
Candidate	Vote	%
Don Downe (X)	4,620	78.0
Kirk Meisner	1,300	12.0

== New Glasgow ==
Candidate	Vote	%
Barrie MacMillan (X)	1,803	62.3
Mark Firth	625	21.6
Ken Langille	465	16.1

== Oxford ==
Candidate	Vote	%
Trish Stewart	238	43.0
Arnold H. MacDonald	213	38.6
Lloyd D. Jenkins (X)	102	18.4

== Region of Queens Municipality ==
Candidate	Vote	%
Chris Clarke	1,961	47,4
David Dagley	1,414	34.1
Owen Hamlin	384	9.3
Mervin Hartlin	382	9.2

== Truro ==
Candidate	Vote	%
Bill Mills (X)	2,228	53.53
Kelti Jones	1,934	46.47

== Yarmouth (Town) ==
Candidate	Vote	%
Pam Mood	1,791	56.7
Charles A. Crosby	725	23.0
Byron Boudreau	641	20.3
