= 2008 Nova Scotia municipal elections =

- 18 October 2008

Municipal elections were held across the Canadian province of Nova Scotia on 18 October 2008.

Voter turnout was 42%. 75% of incumbent councillors and 69% of incumbent mayors were re-elected. 36% of mayors and 23% of councillors ran unopposed.

The following lists races in selected municipalities.

== Amherst ==
Candidate	Vote	%
Rob Small	2434	65.8
Ed Chitty	1264	34.2

== Bridgewater ==
Candidate	Vote	%
Carroll Publicover (X)	Acclaimed	

== Cape Breton Regional Municipality ==
Candidate	Vote	%
John W. Morgan (X)	34,534	82.2
Alan Nathanson	4,447	10.6
Fuzzy Bacich	3,010	7.2

== Halifax Regional Municipality ==
Candidate	Vote	%
Peter J. Kelly (X)	57,229	56.8
Sheila Fougere	41,107	40.8
David Boyd	2372	2.4

== Kentville ==
Candidate	Vote	%
David Corkum (X)	1197	59.9
Larry Eaton	803	40.2

== New Glasgow ==
Candidate	Vote	%
Barrie MacMillan	1925	54.2
Rick Beaton	1024	28.8
Kenneth Langille	604	17.0

== Queens Regional Municipality ==
Candidate	Vote	%
John Leefe (X)	Acclaimed	

== Truro ==
Candidate	Vote	%
Bill Mills (X)	Acclaimed	

== Yarmouth ==
Candidate	Vote	%
Phil Mooney	1781	61.5
Charles Crosby (X)	1113	38.5
