= Charles A. Crosby =

Mayor of Yarmouth
- In office 1988–2008
- Preceded by: Marjorie McEachern
- Succeeded by: Phil Mooney

Personal details
- Born: October 31, 1937 (age 88) Yarmouth, Nova Scotia
- Party: Progressive Conservative

Charles A. (Tick) Crosby (born October 31, 1937) is a former mayor of the town of Yarmouth, Nova Scotia, Canada. He served from 1988 to 2008 and in 2004, he was also President of the Union of Nova Scotia Municipalities.

== Political career ==
Crosby was first elected to Town Council in 1968 and was first elected as Mayor in 1988. During his early years in office, the town was experiencing a difficult time economically as it lost its largest employer, Dominion Textiles and in 1990 the Canadian National Railway ceased to operate. Crosby responded by advancing a plan to bring jobs to the town by turning the closed Rio Algom tin mine into a home for Halifax Regional Municipality's waste, but the plan met strong opposition from environmentalists. Since then, the centre of town was refurbished and the area became centered on the tourist trade.

Notable accomplishments during Crosby's tenure as mayor included the construction of Mariners Centre arena, revitalization of the waterfront, improvements to the water and wastewater treatment systems, development of Starrs Road as a commercial district, and the construction of a new Town Hall.

He was defeated in the 2008 municipal election by Phil Mooney. On February 13, 2009, a tribute dinner was held for Crosby, where he was given a key to the town and Brooklyn Street was renamed Charles Crosby Drive.

On April 29, 2010, Crosby announced that he would run for the Progressive Conservative nomination for the provincial byelection in the electoral district of Yarmouth. On May 29, 2010, he won the nomination, but he was defeated in the byelection held on June 22, 2010, finishing second to Liberal Zach Churchill.

In 2012, Crosby ran again for mayor in the Nova Scotia municipal elections but he finished second with 23 percent of the vote.
