= 65th General Assembly of Nova Scotia =

- Majority parliament
- Dec. 10, 2024 – present

Parliament leaders
- Premier: Tim Houston since August 31, 2021
- Leader of the Opposition: Claudia Chender since December 10, 2024

Party caucuses
- Government: Progressive Conservative Party
- Opposition: New Democratic Party
- Recognized: Liberal Party

House of Assembly
- Speaker of the House: Danielle Barkhouse since September 5, 2024
- Government House leader: Brendan Maguire since December 16, 2024
- Opposition House leader: Lisa Lachance since January 15, 2025
- Members: 55 (before 2026); 56 (since 2026) MLA seats

Sovereign
- Monarch: Charles III; 8 September 2022 – present
- Lieutenant governor: Arthur LeBlanc; June 28, 2017 – December 13, 2024
- Michael Savage; December 13, 2024 – present

Sessions
- 1st session 10 December 2024 –
← 64th	→ 66th

The 65th General Assembly of Nova Scotia is the assembly of the Nova Scotia House of Assembly that was determined in the 2024 Nova Scotia general election.

== List of members ==
Riding	Member	Party	First elected / previously elected	Notes
Annapolis	David Bowlby	Progressive Conservative	2024	
Antigonish	Michelle Thompson	Progressive Conservative	2021	
Argyle	Colton LeBlanc	Progressive Conservative	2019	
Bedford Basin	Tim Outhit	Progressive Conservative	2024	
Bedford South	Damian Stoilov	Progressive Conservative	2024	
Cape Breton Centre-Whitney Pier	Kendra Coombes	NDP	2020	
Cape Breton East	Brian Comer	Progressive Conservative	2019	
Chester-St. Margaret's	Danielle Barkhouse	Progressive Conservative	2021	
Chéticamp-Margarees-Pleasant Bay	Claude Bourgeois	Progressive Conservative	2026	
Clare	Ryan Robicheau	Progressive Conservative	2024	
Clayton Park West	Adegoke Fadare	Progressive Conservative	2024	
Colchester-Musquodoboit Valley	Scott Armstrong	Progressive Conservative	2024	
Colchester North	Tom Taggart	Progressive Conservative	2021	
Cole Harbour-Dartmouth	Brad McGowan	Progressive Conservative	2024	
Cole Harbour	Leah Martin	Progressive Conservative	2024	
Cumberland North	Elizabeth Smith-McCrossin	Independent	2017 (Note: First elected as a Progressive Conservative)	
Cumberland South	Tory Rushton	Progressive Conservative	2018	
Dartmouth East	Tim Halman	Progressive Conservative	2017	
Dartmouth North	Susan Leblanc	NDP	2017	
Dartmouth South	Claudia Chender	NDP	2017	Leader of the Opposition
Digby-Annapolis	Jill Balser	Progressive Conservative	2021	
Eastern Passage	Barbara Adams	Progressive Conservative	2017	
Eastern Shore	Kent Smith	Progressive Conservative	2021	
Fairview-Clayton Park	Lina Hamid	NDP	2024	
Glace Bay-Dominion	John White	Progressive Conservative	2021	
Guysborough-Tracadie	Greg Morrow	Progressive Conservative	2021	
Halifax Armdale	Rod Wilson	NDP	2024	
Halifax Atlantic	Brendan Maguire	Progressive Conservative	2013 (Note: First elected as a Liberal)	
Halifax Chebucto	Krista Gallagher	NDP	2024	
Halifax Citadel-Sable Island	Lisa Lachance	NDP	2021	
Halifax Needham	Suzy Hansen	NDP	2021	
Hammonds Plains-Lucasville	Rick Burns	Progressive Conservative	2024	
Hants East	John A. MacDonald	Progressive Conservative	2021	
Hants West	Melissa Sheehy-Richard	Progressive Conservative	2021	
Inverness	Kyle MacQuarrie	Progressive Conservative	2024	
Kings North	John Lohr	Progressive Conservative	2013	
Kings South	Julie Vanexan	Progressive Conservative	2024	
Kings West	Chris Palmer	Progressive Conservative	2021	
Lunenburg	Susan Corkum-Greek	Progressive Conservative	2021	
Lunenburg West	Becky Druhan	Progressive Conservative	2021	Progressive Conservative until October 27, 2025; left caucus. Joined the Liberal Party on May 11, 2026. Leader of the Liberal Party
Lunenburg West	Becky Druhan	Independent	2021	Progressive Conservative until October 27, 2025; left caucus. Joined the Liberal Party on May 11, 2026. Leader of the Liberal Party
Lunenburg West	Becky Druhan	Liberal	2021	Progressive Conservative until October 27, 2025; left caucus. Joined the Liberal Party on May 11, 2026. Leader of the Liberal Party
Northside-Westmount	Fred Tilley	Progressive Conservative	2021	
Pictou Centre	Danny MacGillivray	Progressive Conservative	2024	
Pictou East	Tim Houston	Progressive Conservative	2013	Premier of Nova Scotia
Pictou West	Marco MacLeod	Progressive Conservative	2024	
Preston	Twila Grosse	Progressive Conservative	2023	
Queens	Kim Masland	Progressive Conservative	2017	
Richmond	Trevor Boudreau	Progressive Conservative	2021	
Sackville-Cobequid	Paul Wozney	NDP	2024	
Sackville-Uniacke	Brad Johns	Progressive Conservative	2017	
Shelburne	Nolan Young	Progressive Conservative	2021	
Sydney-Membertou	Derek Mombourquette	Liberal	2015	
Timberlea-Prospect	Iain Rankin	Liberal	2013	
Truro-Bible Hill-Millbrook-Salmon River	Dave Ritcey	Progressive Conservative	2020	
Victoria-The Lakes	Dianne Timmins	Progressive Conservative	2024	
Waverley-Fall River-Beaverbank	Brian Wong	Progressive Conservative	2021	
Yarmouth	Nick Hilton	Progressive Conservative	2024	

== Seating plan ==
Smith-McCrossin		Stoilov	MacGillivray	Bourgeois	Gallagher	Wilson	Hamid
	Wong	Morrow	Rushton	Smith	Coombes	Hansen	Wozney	DRUHAN
White	Halman	Armstrong	Balser	C. LeBlanc	CHENDER	Lachance	S. Leblanc	Rankin	Mombourquette
Barkhouse
Comer	Young	Masland	Lohr	Maguire	HOUSTON	Adams	Thompson	Tilley	Ritcey	Grosse
Boudreau	Robicheau	MacDonald	Sheehy-Richard	Palmer	Martin	Corkum-Greek	Fadare	MacLeod	Taggart	Johns
McGowan	MacQuarrie	Outhit	Burns	Vanexan		Timmins	Bowlby	Hilton

Current as of September 2026

== Membership changes in the 65th Assembly ==
Number of members per party by date	2024	2025	2026		
Number of members per party by date	November 26	October 27	April 9	May 11	June 23
Progressive Conservative	43	42			43
NDP	9				
Liberal	2			3	
Independent	1	2		1	
Vacant	0		1		0

Membership changes in the 65th General Assembly
Seat	Before			Change			
Seat	Date	Member	Party	Reason	Date	Member	Party
Lunenburg West	October 27, 2025	Becky Druhan	█ PC	Left to become an independent			█ Independent
Chéticamp-Margarees-Pleasant Bay	April 9, 2026	None	█ Vacant	New electoral district created	June 23, 2026	Claude Bourgeois	█ PC
Lunenburg West	May 11, 2026	Becky Druhan	█ PC	Joined the Liberal Party caucus			█ Liberal

== Notes ==
Preceded by 64th General Assembly of Nova Scotia	General Assemblies of Nova Scotia; 2024–present	Succeeded by 66th General Assembly of Nova Scotia
