= 66th Nova Scotia general election =

Canadian provincial election

- On or before December 7, 2029

56 seats in the Nova Scotia House of Assembly 29 seats needed for a majority
- Opinion polls
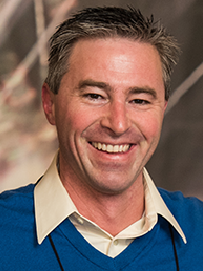

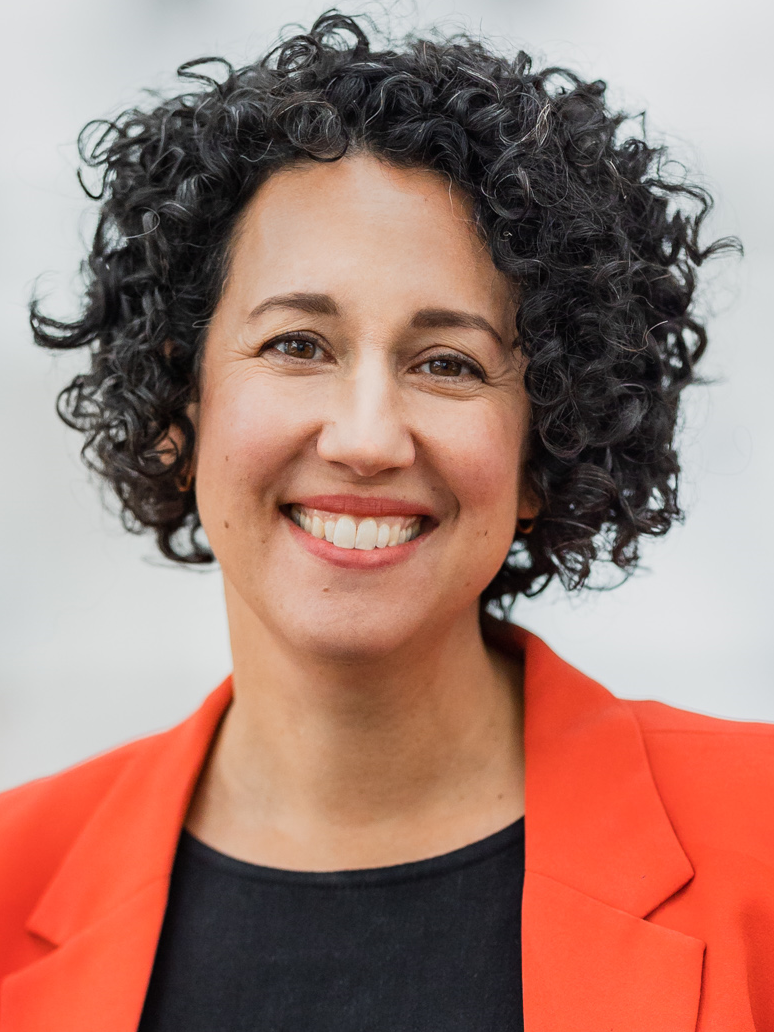
			Liberal
Leader	Tim Houston	Claudia Chender	Becky Druhan
Party	Progressive Conservative	New Democratic	Liberal
Leader since	October 27, 2018	June 25, 2022	November 21, 2026
Leader's seat	Pictou East	Dartmouth South	Lunenburg West
Last election	43 seats, 52.49%	9 seats, 22.17%	2 seats, 22.69%
Current seats	43	9	3
Seats needed	Steady	▲20	▲26
Incumbent premier
Tim Houston
Progressive Conservative

The 66th Nova Scotia general election will elect members of the General Assembly of Nova Scotia to serve in the 66th General Assembly. The election must be held on or before December 7, 2029.

== Background ==
In accordance with Section 4 of the Canadian Charter of Rights and Freedoms, the next election must be held within five years of the previous election. The general assembly may be dissolved earlier by order of the lieutenant governor of Nova Scotia on the advice of the premier. Premier Tim Houston introduced a bill to repeal the 4-year fixed election date legislation on February 18, 2025. The bill then received royal assent on March 26, 2025, reverting the province's electoral cycle into 5 years.

The last review of the province's electoral boundaries took place in 2018 and 2019. Reviews normally take place at least every 10 years. The review in 2025, however, was conducted as a result of an order by the Supreme Court of Nova Scotia, which ruled that the previous commission's decision not to create an exceptional electoral district for Chéticamp violated Section 3 of the Canadian Charter of Rights and Freedoms. In its interim report, submitted in August 2025 after public consultation, the commission presented three alternatives: keeping the status quo, with 55 electoral districts, and two other proposed scenarios, each with 56 electoral districts. After deliberations following a second round of public consultation, in January 2026 the commission unanimously recommended a House of Assembly of 56 seats. The current district of Inverness would be divided into two new electoral districts: Chéticamp-Margarees-Pleasant Bay and Inverness-We’koqma’q.

== Timeline ==
- November 26, 2024: The Progressive Conservative Party wins a majority government in the 2024 Nova Scotia general election. The New Democratic Party replaces the Liberal Party as the official opposition.
- December 10, 2024:
  - Zach Churchill steps down as Liberal Party leader. Derek Mombourquette becomes interim Liberal leader.
  - The first session of the 65th General Assembly of Nova Scotia begins.
- December 8, 2025: Iain Rankin becomes interim leader of the Liberal Party.
- November 21, 2026: The 2026 Nova Scotia Liberal Party leadership election is held, Becky Druhan is elected leader of the Liberal Party.

=== Membership changes ===
Membership changes in the 65th General Assembly
Seat	Before			Change			
Seat	Date	Member	Party	Reason	Date	Member	Party
Lunenburg West	October 27, 2025	Becky Druhan	█ PC	Left to become an independent			█ Independent
Chéticamp-Margarees-Pleasant Bay	April 9, 2026	None	█ Vacant	New electoral district created	June 23, 2026	Claude Bourgeois	█ PC
Lunenburg West	May 11, 2026	Becky Druhan	█ Independent	Joined the Liberal Party caucus			█ Liberal

== Opinion polls ==
=== Graphical Summary ===
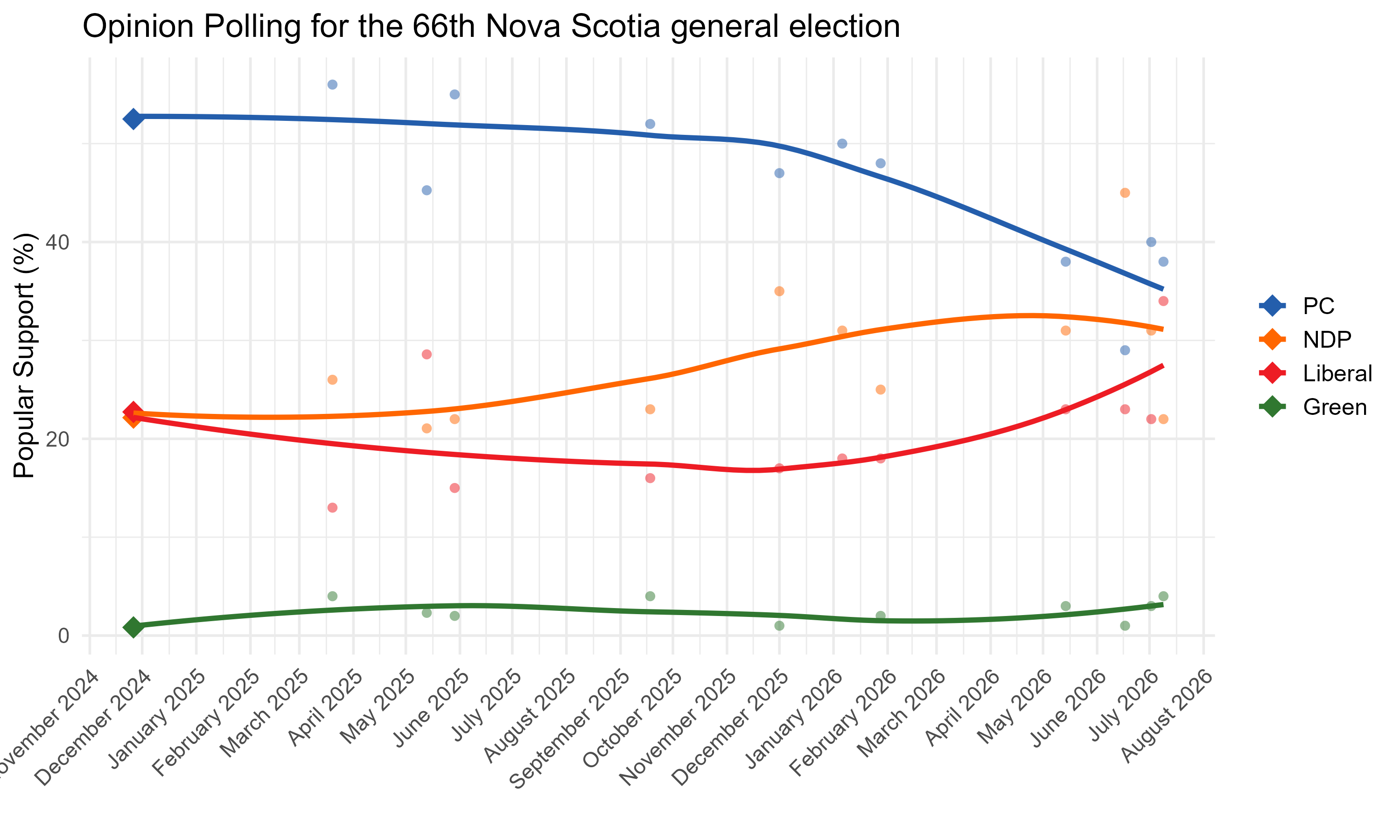
Opinion Polling for the 66th Nova Scotia General Election

=== Table of polls ===
Opinion polls
Polling firm	Dates conducted	Link	PC	Liberal	NDP	Green	Others	Margin of error	Sample size	Polling method	Lead
Narrative Research	16–28 Sep 2026		31	28	36	1	4	—N/a	741	Online	5
Abacus Data	28 Aug–5 Sep 2026		40	22	33	1	5	±3.96%	600	Online	7
MQO Research	3–9 Jul 2026		38	34	22	4	1	±3.9%	632	Online/Telephone	4
Abacus Data	25 Jun–2 Jul 2026		40	22	31	3	5	±4.0%	600	Online	9
Narrative Research	10–17 Jun 2026		29	23	45	1	1	—N/a	733	Online	16
Abacus Data	11–14 May 2026		38	23	31	3	5	±3.96%	610	Online	7
Viewpoints Research	24–26 Apr 2026	(Note: Undecideds removed)	37	22	36	1	3	±3.5%	803	Online	1
Abacus Data	21–28 Jan 2026	(Note: Coletto, Kelly Bennett, David (February 18, 2026). "Abacus Nova Scotia Poll: Houston's PCs Starting Winter Session at 48%". Abacus Data.)	48	18	25	2	7	±4.1%	601	Online	23
Liaison Strategies	4–6 Jan 2026		50	18	31	—N/a	2	±3.4%	800	IVR	19
Angus Reid	26 Nov – 1 Dec 2025		47	17	35	1	1	±5%	296	Online	12
Abacus Data	16–18 Sep 2025		52	16	23	4	4	±4.1%	600	Online	29
Abacus Data	23–29 May 2025		55	15	22	2	5	±3.47%	800	Online	33
Canadian Election Study	29 Apr – 13 May 2025		45	29	21	2	3	—N/a	288	Online	16
Abacus Data	17–20 Mar 2025		56	13	26	4	—N/a	—N/a	600	Online	30
2024 general election	26 Nov 2024		52.50	22.73	22.15	0.83	1.17	—N/a	357,048	—N/a	29.77
