= 2026 Nova Scotia Liberal Party leadership election =

Canadian provincial leadership election

- November 16 – 21, 2026
- Turnout: 2,869 Delegates
	BD	AM
Candidate	Becky Druhan	Amanda Mombourquette
Riding	Lunenburg West	None
First Balllot	3,810.94; 68.05%	1,789.06; 31.95%
Leader before election
Iain Rankin (interim)
Elected leader
Becky Druhan

2026 Nova Scotia Liberal Party leadership election
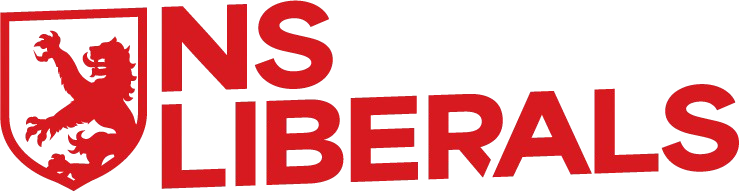
- Date: November 21, 2026
- Convention: Halifax Convention Centre
- Resigning leader: Zach Churchill
- Won by: Becky Druhan
- Ballots: 1
- Candidates: 2
- Entrance fee: $25,000
- Spending limit: $250,000

From November 16 to 21, 2026, members of the Nova Scotia Liberal Party voted in a leadership election to choose a permanent leader to succeed Zach Churchill, who announced his resignation after being defeated in the 2024 Nova Scotia general election.

The party elected its first female leader using a preferential one-member one-vote system, weighted by provincial electoral district.

== Background ==
In 2022, Zach Churchill won the Liberal leadership election, leading the party into the 2024 general election. The party placed in third place with two seats, behind the Progressive Conservatives and New Democratic Party; this was the worst result in party history. Churchill himself was unseated, losing to PC candidate Nick Hilton by 14 votes. He resigned as leader of the party on December 10, 2024. MLA Derek Mombourquette served as interim leader from 2024 to 2025, and was then replaced by former leader Iain Rankin.

The party announced its rules for the leadership election in June 2025.

== Timeline ==
- November 26, 2024 – The Nova Scotia general election is held, resulting in a second consecutive majority PC government. The Liberals won two seats, falling to third place. Zach Churchill failed to win his own seat, and resigned as party leader on December 10.
- December 10, 2024 – MLA Derek Mombourquette becomes interim Liberal leader.
- January 8, 2025 – Rules and procedures for the contest are announced.
- December 8, 2025 – MLA Iain Rankin becomes interim Liberal leader.
- June 9, 2026 – Deputy warden Amanda Mombourquette announces her candidacy.
- July 28, 2026 – Candidate registration and first entrance fee payment deadline.
- July 31, 2026 – MLA Becky Druhan announces her candidacy.
- August 28, 2026 – Second entrance fee payment deadline.
- September 28, 2026 – Second entrance fee payment deadline.
- November 16, 2026 – Voting opens.
- November 21, 2026 – Voting closes. Leadership convention held.

== Candidates ==
=== Declared ===
==== Amanda Mombourquette ====
- Amanda Mombourquette, Richmond County deputy warden

Candidacy announced: June 8, 2026
Campaign website: amandamombourquette.ca

Endorsements of Amanda Mombourquette (18)

Former MLAs: (9)

- Bernie Boudreau (Former MLA for Cape Breton The Lakes, 1988-1997; former Senator from Nova Scotia, 1999-2000; former Leader of the Government in the Senate, 1999-2001; former Minister of State (Atlantic Canada Opportunities Agency), 2000-2001; former Minister of Health of Nova Scotia, 1996-1997; former Minister of Finance of Nova Scotia, 1993-1996)
- Karen Casey (Former MLA for Colchester North, 2006–2021; former Deputy Premier of Nova Scotia, 2017–2021; former Minister of Finance and Treasury Board, 2017–2021; former Minister of Education and Early Childhood Development, 2013–2017; former Minister of Health, 2009; former Minister of Education, 2006–2009)
- Don Downe (Former MLA for Lunenburg West, 1993-2003; former Mayor of the Municipality of the District of Lunenburg, 2008-2016; former Deputy Premier of Nova Scotia, 1998-1999; former Minister of Finance, 1998-1999; former Minister of the Environment, 1998; former Minister of Transportation and Public Works, 1996-1998; former Minister of Business and Consumer Services, 1996; former Minister of Natural Resources, 1993-1996)
- Sandy Jolly (Former MLA for Dartmouth North, 1988–1998; former Minister of Business and Consumer Services, 1996–1997; former Minister of Municipal Affairs, 1993–1996; former Minister of Housing and Consumer Affairs, 1993–1996)
- Richie Mann (Former MLA for Richmond, 1988–1998; former Government House Leader, 1993–1997; former Minister of Transportation and Communications, 1993–1996; former Minister of Transportation and Public Works, 1996; former Minister of Economic Development and Tourism, 1997)
- Stephen McNeil (Former MLA for Annapolis, 2003–2021; former Premier of Nova Scotia, 2013–2021; former Leader of the Opposition, 2009–2013)
- Dennis Richards (Former MLA for Cole Harbour-Eastern Passage, 1993-1998)
- Diana Whalen (Former MLA for Clayton Park West, 2003–2017; former Deputy Premier of Nova Scotia, 2013–2017; former Minister of Justice and Attorney General, 2015–2017; former Minister of Finance and Treasury Board, 2013–2015)
- Gordon Wilson (Former MLA for Clare-Digby, 2013–2021; former Minister of Environment, 2019–2021)

Former MPs: (1)

- Darrell Samson (Former MP for Sackville-Preston-Chezzetcook, 2015-2025)

Municipal politicians: (4)

- Mary Farrell (Former Councillor for Antigonish, 2016–2024)
- James Fuller (Warden and Councillor for Municipality of the District of St. Mary's, 2020–present)
- Bill MacFarlane (Former Councillor and Deputy Warden for Municipality of the County of Antigonish, 2004-2024)
- Phil Mooney (Councillor for Municipality of the District of Yarmouth, 2024–present; former Councillor and Mayor for Yarmouth, 1984–2020)

Other individuals: (4)

- Nadine Bernard (Candidate for Victoria-The Lakes, 2021)
- Gerard Bray (Candidate for Halifax Chebucto, 2024)
- Damian MacInnis (Candidate for Inverness, 2021)
- Barry Mellish (Candidate for Truro-Bible Hill-Millbrook-Salmon River, 2013)

==== Becky Druhan ====
- Becky Druhan, MLA for Lunenburg West (2021–present); formerly Progressive Conservative until 2025, then independent until 2026; former Minister of Education and Early Childhood Development, 2021–2024; former Minister of Justice and Attorney General, 2024–2025

Candidacy announced: July 31, 2026
Campaign website: togetherwithbecky.ca

Endorsements of Becky Druhan (23)

Former MLAs: (13)

- Joanne Bernard (Former MLA for Dartmouth North, 2013–2017; former Minister of Community Services, 2013–2017; former Minister of the Voluntary Sector, 2014–2017)
- Keith Colwell (Former MLA for Preston, 2003-2021; former MLA for Eastern Shore, 1993-1999; former Minister of Fisheries and Aquaculture, 2013-2021; former Minister of Agriculture, 2013-2021; former Minister of Business and Consumer Services, 1998-1999; former Minister of Fisheries and Aquaculture, 1999-1999)
- Francene Cosman (Former MLA for Bedford-Fall River, 1993-1999; former Minister of Human Resources, 1998-1999; former Minister of Community Services, 1997-1999; former Mayor of Bedford, 1979-1982)
- Rafah DiCostanzo (Former MLA for Clayton Park West, 2017-2024)
- Ali Duale (Former MLA for Halifax Armdale, 2021-2024)
- Keith Irving (Former MLA for Kings South, 2013–2024; former Minister of Environment and Climate Change, 2021)
- Carman Kerr (Former MLA for Annapolis, 2021–2024)
- Labi Kousoulis (Former MLA for Halifax Citadel-Sable Island, 2013–2021; former Minister of Finance and Treasury Board, 2021; Minister of Inclusive Economic Growth, 2021; former Minister of Labour and Advanced Education, 2017–2020; former Minister of Internal Services, 2017–2020; former Minister of the Public Service Commission, 2013–2014; former Minister of Information Management, 2013–2014; former Minster of the Voluntary Sector, 2013–2014)
- Ronnie LeBlanc (Former MLA for Clare, 2021–2024)
- Manning MacDonald (Former MLA for Cape Breton South, 1993-2013; former Minister of Economic Development and Tourism, 1997-1999; former Minister of Labour, 1996-1997; former Mayor of Sydney, 1978-1993)
- Karla MacFarlane (Former MLA for Pictou West, 2013–2024; former Speaker of the Nova Scotia House of Assembly, 2023–2024; former Leader of the Opposition, 2018; former Minister of Community Services, 2021–2023; former Minister of L'nu Affairs, 2021–2023)
- Kelly Regan (Former MLA for Bedford Basin, 2009–2024; former Deputy Premier of Nova Scotia, 2021; former Minister of Labour and Advanced Education, 2013–2017; former Minister of Community Services, 2017–2021; Minister of Seniors, 2021)
- Angela Simmonds (Former MLA for Preston, 2021–2023; former Deputy Speaker of the Nova Scotia House of Assembly, 2021–2023)

Former MPs: (1)

- Geoff Regan (Former MP for Halifax West, 1993-1997, 2000-2021; former Speaker of the House of Commons, 2015-2019; former Minister of Fisheries and Oceans, 2003-2006)

Other individuals: (9)

- Jaime Beaton (Candidate for Inverness, 2024)
- Vishal Bhardwaj (Candidate for Cole Harbour-Dartmouth, 2024; candidate for Dartmouth South, 2017)
- Nick d'Entremont (Candidate for Argyle, 2021)
- Elizabeth Eustaquio-Domondon (Candidate for Clayton Park West, 2024)
- Glennie Langille (Candidate for Pictou West, 2013)
- Bobby Morris (Candidate for Inverness, 2017)
- Lorelei Murphy (Candidate for Argyle, 2024)
- Richelle Brown Redden (Candidate for Kings North, 2024)
- Nancy Regan (Journalist; news anchor; television personality; daughter of former Premier Gerald Regan)

=== Declined ===
- Sean Fraser, MP for Central Nova (2015–present)
- Alana Hirtle, MP for Cumberland—Colchester (2025–present)
- Derek Mombourquette, interim leader of the Nova Scotia Liberal Party (2024–2025), MLA for Sydney-Membertou (2015–present)

== Debates ==
Debates among candidates for the 2026 Liberal Party of Nova Scotia leadership election
No.	Date	Time	Place	Participants	
P Participant N Non-invitee A Absent invitee O Out of race (exploring or withdrawn)				Becky Druhan	Amanda Mombourquette
Nova Scotia Liberal Party leadership election debates
1	October 1, 2026	7 p.m.	Halifax Tower Hotel, Halifax	P	P
2	October 15, 2026	7 p.m.	Rodd Grand Yarmouth Hotel, Yarmouth	P	P
3	October 28, 2026	7 p.m.	Membertou Trade & Convention Centre, Membertou First Nation	P	P

== Results ==
= Winner

Candidate	Ballot 1	
Name	Votes	Points
Becky Druhan	1,915; 66.75%	3,810.94; 68.05%
Amanda Mombourquette	954; 33.25%	1,789.06; 31.95%
TOTAL	2,869	5,600

	Ballot 1				
Riding	Becky Druhan		Amanda Mombourquette		Total
Riding	Votes	Points	Votes	Points	Votes
Annapolis	55	59.78	37	40.22	92
Antigonish	33	54.10	28	45.90	61
Argyle	30	93.75	2	6.25	32
Bedford Basin	70	84.34	13	15.66	83
Bedford South	68	82.93	14	17.07	82
Cape Breton Centre-Whitney Pier	16	69.57	7	30.43	23
Cape Breton East	30	69.77	13	30.23	43
Chester-St. Margaret's	59	78.67	16	21.33	75
Chéticamp-Margarees-Pleasant Bay	21	67.74	10	32.26	31
Clare	29	70.73	12	29.27	41
Clayton Park West	74	83.15	15	16.85	89
Colchester-Musquodoboit Valley	12	44.44	15	55.56	27
Colchester North	22	56.41	17	43.59	39
Cole Harbour	12	48.00	13	52.00	25
Cole Harbour-Dartmouth	59	72.84	22	27.16	81
Cumberland North	10	66.67	5	33.33	15
Cumberland South	10	50.00	10	50.00	20
Dartmouth East	45	77.59	13	22.41	58
Dartmouth North	32	65.31	17	34.69	49
Dartmouth South	30	62.50	18	37.50	48
Digby-Annapolis	13	56.52	10	43.48	23
Eastern Passage	15	65.22	8	34.78	23
Eastern Shore	34	73.91	12	26.09	46
Fairview-Clayton Park	39	78.00	11	22.00	50
Glace Bay-Dominion	26	65.00	14	35.00	40
Guysborough-Tracadie	19	67.86	9	32.14	28
Halifax Armdale	41	71.93	16	28.07	57
Halifax Atlantic	38	71.70	15	28.30	53
Halifax Chebucto	59	69.41	26	30.59	85
Halifax Citadel-Sable Island	88	74.58	30	25.42	118
Halifax Needham	50	63.29	29	36.71	79
Hammonds Plains-Lucasville	37	77.08	11	22.92	48
Hants East	29	80.56	7	19.44	36
Hants West	28	75.68	9	24.32	37
Inverness	16	33.33	32	66.67	48
Kings North	25	80.65	6	19.35	31
Kings South	40	76.92	12	23.08	52
Kings West	21	52.50	19	47.50	40
Lunenburg	70	81.40	16	18.60	86
Lunenburg West	100	81.97	22	18.03	122
Northside-Westmount	31	79.49	8	20.51	39
Pictou Centre	27	81.82	6	18.18	33
Pictou East	26	76.47	8	23.53	34
Pictou West	39	90.70	4	9.30	43
Preston	17	85.00	3	15.00	20
Queens	16	84.21	3	15.79	19
Richmond	21	11.11	168	88.89	189
Sackville-Cobequid	12	52.17	11	47.83	23
Sackville-Uniacke	11	50.00	11	50.00	22
Shelburne	22	68.75	10	31.25	32
Sydney-Membertou	33	76.74	10	23.26	43
Timberlea-Prospect	46	75.41	15	24.59	61
Truro-Bible Hill-Millbrook-Salmon River	13	44.83	16	55.17	29
Victoria-The Lakes	29	55.77	23	44.23	52
Waverley-Fall River-Beaver Bank	28	70.00	12	30.00	40
Yarmouth	39	52.70	35	47.30	74

== See also ==
- 2026 Canadian electoral calendar
- Nova Scotia Liberal Party leadership elections
