= Ben Jessome =

Canadian politician

The Honourable Ben Jessome ECNS

Member of the Nova Scotia House of Assembly for Hammonds Plains-Lucasville
- In office October 8, 2013 – October 27, 2024
- Preceded by: Riding Established
- Succeeded by: Rick Burns

Personal details
- Born: Benjamin Thomas Jessome
- Party: Liberal

Benjamin Thomas Jessome is a Canadian politician, who was elected to the Nova Scotia House of Assembly in the 2013 provincial election. A member of the Nova Scotia Liberal Party, he represented the electoral district of Hammonds Plains-Lucasville.

== Early life and education ==
Jessome attended Hammonds Plains Consolidated School, Madeline Symonds Middle School and Charles P. Allen High School. He graduated from Hebron Academy in 2006. In 2011, Jessome completed a bachelor's degree in recreation management from Acadia University. While at Acadia, Jessome was elected President of the Students' Union, was a member of the University Board of Governors and Senate, and represented the interests of his constituents to the provincial and national governments, as a delegate with the Alliance of Nova Scotia Student Associations (now Students Nova Scotia) and the Canadian Alliance of Student Associations.

== Political career ==
In May 2013, Jessome successfully ran for the Liberal nomination in the riding of Hammonds Plains-Lucasville. He was elected in the 2013 provincial election. Currently Jessome is Vice Chair of the Private & Local Bills Committee. He is a member of the Veterans Affairs Committee. Jessome is also a member of the economic Development and Human Resources Committee, with a focus on Youth Employment strategies.

On February 23, 2021, Jessome was appointed to the Executive Council of Nova Scotia as Minister of the Public Service Commission.

Jessome was re-elected in the 2021 election, however the Rankin Liberals lost government becoming the Official Opposition.

From September 22, 2024, until his defeat general election later that year, Jessome served as the Official Opposition critic for the Emergency Management Office, Internal Services, and Communications Nova Scotia.

== Electoral record ==
2017 Nova Scotia general election: Hammonds Plains-Lucasville
Party	Candidate	Votes	%	±%
Liberal	Ben Jessome	3,432	46.69	-5.55
Progressive Conservative	Matt Whitman	2,421	32.94	+11.09
New Democratic	Paul McGuinness	1,157	15.74	-8.57
Green	Jessica Alexander	340	4.62	–
Total valid votes		7,350	100.00	–
Total rejected ballots		16	0.22	-0.15
Turnout		7,366	57.34	+0.29
Eligible voters		12,847		
Liberal hold		Swing		-8.32
Source: Elections Nova Scotia

2013 Nova Scotia general election
Party	Candidate	Votes	%	±%
Liberal	Ben Jessome	3,402	52.24	N/A
New Democratic Party	Peter Lund	1,583	24.31	N/A
Progressive Conservative	Gina Byrne	1,423	21.85	N/A
Atlantica	Jonathan Dean	104	1.60	N/A
