= Ronnie LeBlanc =

Canadian politician

Member of the Nova Scotia House of Assembly for Clare
- In office 17 August 2021 – 27 October 2024
- Preceded by: Riding created
- Succeeded by: Ryan Robicheau

Personal details
- Born: Ronnie Joseph LeBlanc; 25 November 1968 (age 57) Yarmouth, Nova Scotia, Canada
- Party: Liberal
- Occupation: Fisherman

Ronnie Joseph LeBlanc (born 25 November 1968) is a Canadian politician, who represented the riding of Clare in the Nova Scotia House of Assembly as a member of the Nova Scotia Liberal Party from 2021 to 2024.

== Political career ==
A fisherman by career, LeBlanc served as a municipal councillor in Clare from 2000 to 2021.

LeBlanc was elected to the Nova Scotia House of Assembly in the 2021 Nova Scotia general election. LeBlanc served as the Official Opposition critic for Fisheries and Aquaculture, Acadian Affairs and Francophonie, and Forestry. He was defeated by Progressive Conservative candidate Ryan Robicheau in the 2024 Nova Scotia general election.

He contested Acadie—Annapolis as the Liberal candidate in the 2025 Canadian federal election, losing to Conservative incumbent Chris d'Entremont, who himself joined the Liberals in November 2025.

At the time of the 2025 Canadian federal election, he lived in Meteghan, Nova Scotia.

== Electoral record ==
2025 Canadian federal election: Acadie—Annapolis
Party	Candidate	Votes	%	±%	Expenditures
Conservative	Chris d'Entremont	23,024	47.67	−3.64	
Liberal	Ronnie LeBlanc	22,491	46.57	+15.88	
New Democratic	Ingrid Deon	1,768	3.66	−9.03	
Green	Matthew Piggott	583	1.21	N/A	
People's	James Strange	432	0.89	−4.41	
Total valid votes/expense limit		48,298	99.36	—	126,105.96
Total rejected ballots		311	0.64		
Turnout		48,609	72.72		
Eligible voters		66,847			
Conservative hold		Swing		−9.76	
Source: Elections Canada
Note: number of eligible voters does not include voting day registrations.

2024 Nova Scotia general election: Clare
Party	Candidate	Votes	%	±%
Progressive Conservative	Ryan Robicheau	2,805	59.71	+16.29
Liberal	Ronnie LeBlanc	1,790	38.10	-11.79
New Democratic	Dre Taylor	103	2.19	-1.10
Total valid votes		4,698	99.22	
Total rejected ballots		51	1.07	+0.22
Turnout		4,749	65.90	-1.19
Eligible voters		7,206		
Progressive Conservative gain from Liberal		Swing		+14.00
Source: Elections Nova Scotia

2021 Nova Scotia general election: Clare
Party	Candidate	Votes	%	±%	Expenditures
Liberal	Ronnie LeBlanc	2,322	49.89	-1.34	$37,791.91
Progressive Conservative	Carl Deveau	2,021	43.43	+13.12	$13,595.33
Green	Claire McDonald	158	3.39	–	$200.00
New Democratic	Cameron Pye	153	3.29	-15.17	$10,832.43
Total valid votes/expense limit		4,654	99.15	–	$44,268.32
Total rejected ballots		40	0.85		
Turnout		4,694	67.19		
Eligible voters		6,986			
Liberal notional hold		Swing		-7.23	
Source: Elections Nova Scotia
