= 2026 Chéticamp-Margarees-Pleasant Bay provincial by-election =

Nova Scotia House of Assembly by-election

- June 23, 2026

Riding of Chéticamp-Margarees-Pleasant Bay
	PC	LIB	NDP
Candidate	Claude Bourgeois	Denis Cormier	Trevor Poirier
Party	Progressive Conservative	Liberal	New Democratic
Popular vote	1,315	1,080	258
Percentage	48.8%	40.0%	9.6%
Swing	▼4.4%	▲6.1%	▼3.3%
MLA before election
None (Note: New riding was created from part of Inverness.)
Progressive Conservative (transposed)
Elected MLA
Claude Bourgeois
Progressive Conservative

A by-election was held on June 23, 2026, to elect a member of the Nova Scotia House of Assembly for the newly created provincial riding of Chéticamp-Margarees-Pleasant Bay. The by-election was won by the governing Progressive Conservatives and its candidate Claude Bourgeois.

== Background ==
After a court ruled that the government had violated the Canadian Charter of Rights and Freedoms by not creating a Francophone opportunity seat on Cape Breton Island in 2019, the new district was created to represent traditional Acadian people in the area. The new district is the smallest riding in the province.

If the results of the 2024 Nova Scotia general election were to be redistributed to the district's boundaries, the Progressive Conservative would have won about 53% of the vote, with the Liberals behind at 34%. The NDP would have won about 13%.

== Candidates ==
The deadline for candidates to apply for this election was set as 2 PM on 3 June 2026.

=== Progressive Conservative Party ===
The Progressive Conservative Party nominated local business owner Claude Bourgeois on 12 May 2026.

=== Liberal Party ===
The Liberal Party announced on 4 May 2026 that it had chosen retired teacher Denis Cormier as its candidate.

=== New Democratic Party ===
The NDP nominated Trevor Poirier, a long-term care worker and president of the Canadian Union of Public Employees Local 2031, as its candidate on 12 May 2026.

=== Green Party ===
The Greens nominated tattoo artist and small-business owner Nikki "Nik" Boisvert, whose candidacy was confirmed at the nomination deadline on 3 June 2026. Boisvert previously ran as the Marxist–Leninist candidate during two federal elections: first in Sydney—Victoria during the 2021 Canadian federal election where they finished last (6th) with 127 votes (0.3%), and then in Sydney—Glace Bay as part of the 2025 Canadian federal election, where they finished last (8th) with 85 votes (0.18%).

== Results ==
Nova Scotia provincial by-election, June 23, 2026: Chéticamp-Margarees-Pleasant Bay Creation of new seat due to court challenge
Party	Candidate	Votes	%	±%
Progressive Conservative	Claude Bourgeois	1,315	48.76	-4.45
Liberal	Denis Cormier	1,080	40.04	+6.13
New Democratic	Trevor Poirier	258	9.57	-3.31
Green	Nik Boisvert	44	1.63	
Total valid votes		2,697	98.83	
Total rejected ballots		32	1.17	
Turnout		2,729	68.81	
Eligible voters		3,966		
Progressive Conservative notional hold		Swing		-5.29
Source: Elections Nova Scotia

== Previous results ==
2024 Nova Scotia general election redistributed results
Party	Votes	%
Progressive Conservative	946	53.2
Liberal	603	33.9
New Democratic	229	12.9
