= John M. Baillie =

Canadian politician (1847–1913)

John McKay Baillie (December 10, 1847 – May 4, 1913) was a farmer, school teacher and political figure in Nova Scotia, Canada. He represented Pictou County in the Nova Scotia House of Assembly from 1906 to 1911 as a Liberal-Conservative member.

He was born in Earltown, Colchester County, Nova Scotia, the son of Kenneth Baillie and Maria McKay, and was educated at the Pictou Academy. He taught school for 21 years. Baillie married Mary Jane McKay. He served as superintendent for the Pictou County Municipal Home from around 1882 to 1907. Baillie was leader of the Opposition in the provincial assembly from 1910 to 1911. He was defeated when he ran for reelection in 1911 and then served as customs officer for New Glasgow from 1911 until his death there at the age of 65 in 1913.
