= 42nd Nova Scotia general election =

The 42nd Nova Scotia general election may refer to

- the 1941 Nova Scotia general election, the 41st overall general election for Nova Scotia, for the (due to a counting error in 1859) 42nd General Assembly of Nova Scotia, or
- the 1945 Nova Scotia general election, the 42nd overall general election for Nova Scotia, for the 43rd General Assembly of Nova Scotia, but considered the 20th general election for the Canadian province of Nova Scotia.
- the Next Nova Scotia general election, the 64th overall general election for Nova Scotia, for the 65th Legislative Assembly of Nova Scotia, but considered the 42nd general election for the Canadian province of Nova Scotia.
