= Krista Gallagher =

Canadian politician

Member of the Nova Scotia House of Assembly for Halifax Chebucto
- Incumbent
- Assumed office November 26, 2024
- Preceded by: Gary Burrill

Personal details
- Political party: Nova Scotia New Democratic Party

Krista Gallagher is a Canadian politician who was elected to the Nova Scotia House of Assembly in the 2024 general election, representing Halifax Chebucto as a member of the New Democratic Party.

As of August 2025, Gallagher serves as the Official Opposition critic for Economic Development, Agriculture, Gaelic Affairs, and Fisheries and Aquaculture.

== Electoral record ==
=== 2024 ===
2024 Nova Scotia general election: Halifax Chebucto
Party	Candidate	Votes	%	±%
New Democratic	Krista Gallagher	3,682	54.2%	
Progressive Conservative	Tonya Malay	1,577	23.2%	
Liberal	Gerard Bray	1,413	20.8%	
Green	Jonathan Bradet-Legris	120	1.8%	
Total valid votes				
Total rejected ballots				
Turnout		6,792		
Eligible voters				
New Democratic hold		Swing		
Source: Elections Nova Scotia
