= Melissa Sheehy-Richard =

Canadian politician

Melissa Sheehy-Richard MLA

Member of the Nova Scotia House of Assembly for Hants West
- Incumbent
- Assumed office August 17, 2021
- Preceded by: Chuck Porter

Personal details
- Born: 1974 (age 51–52)
- Party: Progressive Conservative

Melissa Sheehy-Richard (born 1974) is a Canadian politician who was elected to the Nova Scotia House of Assembly in the 2021 Nova Scotia general election. She represents the riding of Hants West as a member of the Progressive Conservative Association of Nova Scotia.

Ms. Sheehy-Richard is a paralegal and operates her own home-based business.

== Electoral record ==
=== 2024 ===
2024 Nova Scotia general election: Hants West
| Party | Candidate | Votes | % | ±% |
|---|---|---|---|---|
| Progressive Conservative | Melissa Sheehy-Richard | 4,253 | 52.59 | +9.48 |
| Liberal | Brian Casey | 2,621 | 32.41 | -9.17 |
| New Democratic | Simon Greenough | 1,120 | 13.85 | +2.82 |
| Independent | James Omand | 93 | 1.15 | – |
| Total valid votes | | 8,087 | – | |
| Total rejected ballots | | 43 | | |
| Turnout | | 8,130 | 45.91 | |
| Eligible voters | | 17,707 | | |
| Progressive Conservative hold | | Swing | | |
Source: Elections Nova Scotia

=== 2021 ===
2021 Nova Scotia general election: Hants West
| Party | Candidate | Votes | % | ±% | Expenditures |
|---|---|---|---|---|---|
| Progressive Conservative | Melissa Sheehy-Richard | 3,968 | 43.11 | +14.18 | $40,454.11 |
| Liberal | Brian Casey | 3,827 | 41.58 | -13.16 | $40,039.34 |
| New Democratic | Caet Moir | 1,015 | 11.03 | -1.42 | $31,621.71 |
| Green | Jenn Kang | 273 | 2.97 | -0.07 | $200.00 |
| Atlantica | Gordon J. Berry | 121 | 1.31 | +0.47 | $200.00 |
| Total valid votes/expense limit | | 9,204 | 99.73 | – | $94,843.34 |
| Total rejected ballots | | 25 | 0.27 | | |
| Turnout | | 9,229 | 55.98 | | |
| Eligible voters | | 16,485 | | | |
| Progressive Conservative gain from Liberal | | Swing | | +13.67 | |
Source: Elections Nova Scotia
