= Chris Palmer (Nova Scotia politician) =

Canadian politician

Chris Palmer MLA

Member of the Nova Scotia House of Assembly for Kings West
- Incumbent
- Assumed office August 17, 2021
- Preceded by: Leo Glavine

Personal details
- Born: Chris Matthew Palmer; 1969 (age 56–57)
- Party: Progressive Conservative

Chris Matthew Palmer (born 1969) is a Canadian politician who was elected to the Nova Scotia House of Assembly in the 2021 Nova Scotia general election. He represents the riding of Kings West as a member of the Progressive Conservative Association of Nova Scotia.

He is a financial advisor and active community volunteer.

== Electoral record ==
=== 2024 ===
2024 Nova Scotia general election: Kings West
| Party | Candidate | Votes | % | ±% |
|---|---|---|---|---|
| Progressive Conservative | Chris Palmer | 5,226 | 72.78 | +23.33 |
| Liberal | Brad Beardsley | 1,074 | 14.96 | -26.56 |
| New Democratic | Paul Doerr | 714 | 9.94 | +4.03 |
| Green | Madeleine Taylor | 167 | 2.33 | 0.00 |
| Total valid votes | | 7,181 | | |
| Total rejected ballots | | 22 | | |
| Turnout | | 7,207 | 39.68 | |
| Eligible voters | | 18,164 | | |
| Progressive Conservative hold | | Swing | | |
Source: Elections Nova Scotia

=== 2021 ===
2021 Nova Scotia general election: Kings West
| Party | Candidate | Votes | % | ±% | Expenditures |
|---|---|---|---|---|---|
| Progressive Conservative | Chris Palmer | 4,592 | 49.45 | +12.28 | $59,202.28 |
| Liberal | Emily Lutz | 3,856 | 41.52 | -10.53 | $46,726.60 |
| New Democratic | Jason Langille | 549 | 5.91 | -1.54 | $25,715.69 |
| Green | Sue Earle | 216 | 2.33 | -0.76 | $460.95 |
| Atlantica | Rick Mehta | 74 | 0.79 | +0.55 | $200.00 |
| Total valid votes/expense limit | | 9,287 | 99.73 | – | $95,352.07 |
| Total rejected ballots | | 25 | 0.27 | | |
| Turnout | | 9,312 | 56.65 | | |
| Eligible voters | | 16,439 | | | |
| Progressive Conservative gain from Liberal | | Swing | | +11.41 | |
Source: Elections Nova Scotia
