= Becky Druhan =

Canadian politician

The Honourable Becky Druhan ECNS MLA

Leader of the Nova Scotia Liberal Party
- Incumbent
- Assumed office November 21, 2026
- Preceded by: Iain Rankin (Interm)

Attorney General of Nova Scotia
- In office December 12, 2024 – October 21, 2025
- Premier: Tim Houston
- Preceded by: Brad Johns
- Succeeded by: Scott Armstrong

Minister of Education and Early Childhood Development
- In office August 31, 2021 – December 12, 2024
- Premier: Tim Houston
- Preceded by: Derek Mombourquette
- Succeeded by: Brendan Maguire

Member of the Nova Scotia House of Assembly for Lunenburg West
- Incumbent
- Assumed office August 17, 2021
- Preceded by: Mark Furey

Personal details
- Born: Rebecca Carol Druhan; April 23, 1976 (age 50) Halifax, Nova Scotia, Canada
- Party: Nova Scotia Liberal Party (since 2026)
- Other political affiliations: Progressive Conservative Association of Nova Scotia (until 2025); Independent (2025–2026)

Rebecca Carol Druhan (born April 23, 1976) is a Canadian politician who has served as leader of the Nova Scotia Liberal Party since 2026 and was elected to the Nova Scotia House of Assembly in the 2021 Nova Scotia general election, representing the riding of Lunenburg West. First elected as a member of the Progressive Conservative Association of Nova Scotia, she left the party in October 2025 and then sat as an independent MLA until 2026, when she joined the Nova Scotia Liberal Party.

== Life and education ==
Rebecca Carol Druhan was born on April 23, 1976, in Halifax, Nova Scotia. Druhan graduated from Dalhousie University in 1997 with a Bachelor of Arts degree. In 2003, she received a Bachelor of Laws from Dalhousie Law School and was admitted to the bar in 2004.

== Career ==
Prior to her election to the legislature, Druhan was a lawyer and program coordinator for the Victorian Order of Nurses.

Druhan was sworn in as the minister for Education and Early Childhood Development on August 31, 2021. She was appointed Minister of Justice and Attorney General for Nova Scotia in December 2024, and served in the position until an October 21, 2025 Cabinet shuffle. On October 27, 2025, Druhan left the Progressive Conservative party, citing "a difference of principles". After sitting as an independent in the legislature, she joined the Liberals in May 2026 and announced her intention to run in the 2026 Nova Scotia Liberal Party leadership election. She won the election, defeating Amanda Mombourquette in November. Druhan is the first female Liberal leader.

== Electoral record ==
=== 2024 ===
2024 Nova Scotia general election: Lunenburg West
Party	Candidate	Votes	%	±%
Progressive Conservative	Becky Druhan	4,239	56.28	+11.86
Liberal	Jonathan Crouse	2,302	30.56	-4.37
New Democratic	Nicholas Plovesan	846	11.23	-7.44
Green	Mitchell Thomas-Langford	145	1.93	-0.04
Total valid votes		7,532		
Total rejected ballots		39		
Turnout		7,572	43.98	
Eligible voters		17,217		
Progressive Conservative hold		Swing		
Source: Elections Nova Scotia

=== 2021 ===
2021 Nova Scotia general election: Lunenburg West
Party	Candidate	Votes	%	±%	Expenditures
Progressive Conservative	Becky Druhan	4,065	44.42	+16.69	$41,784.29
Liberal	Jennifer Naugler	3,197	34.94	-12.15	$43,562.40
New Democratic	Merydie Ross	1,709	18.67	-2.08	$48,588.41
Green	Eric Wade	180	1.97	-2.46	$200.00
Total valid votes/expense limit		9,151	99.75	–	$94,583.99
Total rejected ballots		23	0.25		
Turnout		9,174	55.65		
Eligible voters		16,484			
Progressive Conservative gain from Liberal		Swing		+14.42	
Source: Elections Nova Scotia
