= Chéticamp-Margarees-Pleasant Bay =

Provincial electoral district in Nova Scotia, Canada

Nova Scotia electoral district
- The riding of Chéticamp-Margarees-Pleasant Bay (as it exists from 2026) in relation to other Nova Scotia electoral districts

Provincial electoral district
- Legislature: Nova Scotia House of Assembly
MLA
Claude Bourgeois
Progressive Conservative
- District created: 2026
- Last contested: 2026

Demographics
- Population (2021): 4,559
- Electors: 3,889
- Census division: Inverness County
- Census subdivision: Inverness, Subd. A

Chéticamp-Margarees-Pleasant Bay is a provincial electoral district on Cape Breton Island, Nova Scotia, Canada, that elects one member of the Nova Scotia House of Assembly. The exceptional riding was created in 2026 to improve the effective representation of the Acadian and francophone population of Chéticamp and surrounding area.

The per-decade review of the province's electoral boundaries in 2025 was conducted as a result of an order by the Supreme Court of Nova Scotia, which ruled that the previous commission's decision not to create an exceptional electoral district for Chéticamp violated Section 3 of the Canadian Charter of Rights and Freedoms. In its interim report, submitted in August 2025 after public consultation, the commission presented three alternatives: keeping the status quo, with 55 electoral districts, and two other proposed scenarios, each with 56 electoral districts. After deliberations following a second round of public consultation, the commission unanimously recommended in January 2026 a House of Assembly of 56 seats. The commission proposed dividing the district of Inverness into the electoral districts of Chéticamp-Margarees-Pleasant Bay and Inverness-We'koqma'q.

Legislation to establish the new electoral district of Chéticamp-Margarees-Pleasant Bay while retaining the name Inverness for the remainder of the former constituency was introduced on February 26, 2026, and received royal assent on April 9, 2026. On May 24, 2026, Premier Tim Houston called a by-election to elect the first member of the new district, with voting scheduled for June 23, 2026. Progressive Conservative candidate Claude Bourgeois won the by-election, becoming the new riding's first member of the Legislative Assembly.

== Members of the Legislative Assembly ==
Chéticamp-Margarees-Pleasant Bay has elected the following members of the Legislative Assembly:

Chéticamp-Margarees-Pleasant Bay
Legislature	Years	Member	Party
Riding created from Inverness
65th	2026–present	Claude Bourgeois	Progressive Conservative

== Election results ==
Nova Scotia provincial by-election, June 23, 2026 Creation of new seat due to court challenge
Party	Candidate	Votes	%	±%
Progressive Conservative	Claude Bourgeois	1,315	48.76	-4.45
Liberal	Denis Cormier	1,080	40.04	+6.13
New Democratic	Trevor Poirier	258	9.57	-3.31
Green	Nik Boisvert	44	1.63	
Total valid votes		2,697	98.83	
Total rejected ballots		32	1.17	
Turnout		2,729	68.81	
Eligible voters		3,966		
Progressive Conservative notional hold		Swing		-5.29
Source: Elections Nova Scotia

2024 Nova Scotia general election redistributed results
Party	Votes	%
Progressive Conservative	946	53.21
Liberal	603	33.91
New Democratic	229	12.88

== See also ==
- List of Nova Scotia provincial electoral districts
- Canadian provincial electoral districts
