= Danny MacGillivray =

Canadian politician

Member of the Nova Scotia House of Assembly for Pictou Centre
- Incumbent
- Assumed office November 26, 2024
- Preceded by: Pat Dunn

Personal details
- Party: Progressive Conservative Association of Nova Scotia

Danny MacKenzie MacGillivray is a Canadian politician who was elected to the Nova Scotia House of Assembly in the 2024 general election, representing Pictou Centre as a member of the Progressive Conservative Association of Nova Scotia.

Prior to his election, he had been mayor of Stellarton from 2016.

== Electoral record ==
2024 Nova Scotia general election: Pictou Centre
Party	Candidate	Votes	%	±%
Progressive Conservative	Danny MacGillivray	3,741	67.61	+11.84
Liberal	Kris MacFarlane	972	17.57	-13.36
New Democratic	Mary Stewart	820	14.82	+3.07
Total valid votes		5,533		
Total rejected ballots		38		
Turnout		5,571	41.11	
Eligible voters		13,553		
Progressive Conservative hold		Swing		
Source: Elections Nova Scotia
