= Ryan Robicheau =

Canadian politician

Member of the Nova Scotia House of Assembly for Clare
- Incumbent
- Assumed office November 26, 2024
- Preceded by: Ronnie LeBlanc

Personal details
- Born: Ryan Robicheau; July 8, 1993 (age 32)
- Party: Progressive Conservative Association of Nova Scotia

Ryan Robicheau (born July 8, 1993) is a Canadian politician who was elected to the Nova Scotia House of Assembly in the 2024 general election, representing Clare as a member of the Progressive Conservative Association of Nova Scotia.

== Before politics ==
Prior to becoming a member of the Nova Scotia House of Assembly, Robicheau worked as an economic development officer for CBDC Digby-Clare.

== Electoral record ==
2024 Nova Scotia general election: Clare
Party	Candidate	Votes	%	±%
Progressive Conservative	Ryan Robicheau	2,805	59.71	+16.29
Liberal	Ronnie LeBlanc	1,790	38.10	-11.79
New Democratic	Dre Taylor	103	2.19	-1.10
Total valid votes		4,698	99.22	
Total rejected ballots		51	1.07	+0.22
Turnout		4,749	65.90	-1.19
Eligible voters		7,206		
Progressive Conservative gain from Liberal		Swing		+14.00
Source: Elections Nova Scotia
