= Kim Masland =

Canadian politician

The Honourable Kim Masland ECNS MLA

Member of the Nova Scotia House of Assembly for Queens Queens-Shelburne (2017-2021)
- Incumbent
- Assumed office May 30, 2017
- Preceded by: Sterling Belliveau

Personal details
- Born: July 16, 1970 (age 55)
- Party: Progressive Conservative
- Occupation: Executive assistant, banker

Kimberly "Kim" Dawn Masland (born July 16, 1970) is a Canadian politician who was elected to the Nova Scotia House of Assembly in the 2017 provincial election. A member of the Progressive Conservative Association of Nova Scotia, she represents the electoral district of Queens.

== Early life and education ==
Masland graduated from North Queens Community School in 1988. She then graduated from Halifax Business Academy with a diploma in business administration.

== Career ==
Prior to her election to the House of Assembly, Masland served as chief of staff for former Member of Parliament Gerald Keddy. She previously worked with the Royal Bank of Canada in Liverpool for eight years in personal banking.

On August 31, 2021, Masland was made Minister of Public Works.

She was re-elected in the 2024 Nova Scotia general election.

== Electoral record ==
2024 Nova Scotia general election: Queens
Party	Candidate	Votes	%	±%
Progressive Conservative	Kim Masland	3,461	79.93	+9.56
Liberal	Cathy DeRome	487	11.25	-9.14
New Democratic	Brian Skabar	382	8.82	+2.56
Total		4,330	–	
Total rejected ballots		21		
Turnout		4,354	46.65	
Eligible voters		9,333		
Progressive Conservative hold		Swing		
Source: Elections Nova Scotia

2021 Nova Scotia general election
Party	Candidate	Votes	%	±%
Progressive Conservative	Kim Masland	3,627	70.37	+19.96
Liberal	Susan McLeod	1,051	20.39	-7.04
New Democratic	Mary Dahr	323	6.27	-12.28
Green	Brian Muldoon	153	2.97	-0.64
Total valid votes		5,154	99.59	
Total rejected ballots		21	0.41	
Turnout		5,175	58.36	
Eligible voters		8,868		
Progressive Conservative hold		Swing		+13.50
Source: Elections Nova Scotia

2017 Nova Scotia general election
Party	Candidate	Votes	%	±%
Progressive Conservative	Kim Masland	3,244	43.82	+11.33
Liberal	Vernon Oickle	2,303	31.11	+3.25
New Democratic	John Davis	1,581	21.36	-15.74
Green	Kathleen Milan	275	3.71	+1.16
Total valid votes		7,403	100.0	
Total rejected ballots		25	0.34	-0.31
Turnout		7,428	53.20	-6.78
Eligible voters		13,961		
