= Nolan Young =

Canadian politician

The Honourable Nolan Young ECNS MLA

Member of the Nova Scotia House of Assembly for Shelburne
- Incumbent
- Assumed office August 17, 2021
- Preceded by: Office established

Personal details
- Born: Nolan Bromley Young
- Party: Progressive Conservative

Nolan Bromley Young is a Canadian politician who was elected to the Nova Scotia House of Assembly in the 2021 Nova Scotia general election. He represents the riding of Shelburne as a member of the Progressive Conservative Association of Nova Scotia.

On December 12, 2024, Young was appointed to the Executive Council of Nova Scotia as Minister of Labour, Skills and Immigration.

Prior to his election to the legislature, Young was a municipal councillor and deputy mayor in Shelburne.

He was re-elected in the 2024 Nova Scotia general election.

== Electoral results ==
2024 Nova Scotia general election: Shelburne
Party	Candidate	Votes	%	±%
Progressive Conservative	Nolan Young	3,092	76.80	+14.24
New Democratic	Bridget Taylor	482	11.97	-0.09
Liberal	Debbie Muise	452	11.23	-12.53
Total valid votes		4,026		
Total rejected ballots		40		
Turnout		4,068	34.32	
Eligible voters		11,853		
Progressive Conservative hold		Swing		
Source: Elections Nova Scotia

2021 Nova Scotia general election
Party	Candidate	Votes	%	±%
Progressive Conservative	Nolan Young	3,905	62.56	+16.28
Liberal	Penny Smith	1,483	23.76	-10.02
New Democratic	Darren Stoddard	753	12.06	-5.74
Green	Steve Hirchak	101	1.62	-0.52
Total valid votes		6,242	99.55	
Total rejected ballots		28	0.45	
Turnout		6,270	54.50	
Eligible voters		11,505		
Source: Elections Nova Scotia
Progressive Conservative notional hold		Swing		+13.15
