= Bedford Basin (electoral district) =

Provincial electoral district in Nova Scotia, Canada

Nova Scotia electoral district

Provincial electoral district
- Legislature: Nova Scotia House of Assembly
MLA
Tim Outhit
Progressive Conservative
- District created: 2019
- First contested: 2021
- Last contested: 2024

Demographics
- Electors: 13,113
- Area (km²): 23
- Census division: Halifax Regional Municipality
- Census subdivision: Halifax Regional Municipality

Bedford Basin is a provincial electoral district of Nova Scotia, Canada, that came into effect for the 2021 Nova Scotia general election. It elects one member to the Legislative Assembly of Nova Scotia.

The riding was created by the 2019 provincial redistribution out of parts of Bedford and Waverley-Fall River-Beaver Bank. It contains the neighbourhoods of Oakmount, Bedford Common, Glen Moir, Paper Mill Lake and part of Millview in the community of Bedford, Nova Scotia, part of the Halifax Regional Municipality.

== Members of the Legislative Assembly ==
This riding has elected the following MLAs:

Bedford Basin
Legislature	Years	Member	Party
Riding created from Bedford and Waverley-Fall River-Beaver Bank
64th	2021–2024	Kelly Regan	Liberal
65th	2024–present	Tim Outhit	Progressive Conservative

== Election results ==
=== 2024 ===
2024 Nova Scotia general election
Party	Candidate	Votes	%	±%
Progressive Conservative	Tim Outhit	3,692	60.15	+34.39
Liberal	Doris Robbins	1,310	21.34	-29.52
New Democratic	Ryan Lutes	1,136	18.51	-2.86
Total		6,138	–	
Total rejected ballots		31		
Turnout		6,170	46.76	
Eligible voters		13,194		
Progressive Conservative gain		Swing		
Source: Elections Nova Scotia

=== 2021 ===
2021 Nova Scotia general election
Party	Candidate	Votes	%	±%	Expenditures
Liberal	Kelly Regan	3,700	50.87	–1.88	$54,231.55
Progressive Conservative	Nick Driscoll	1,874	25.76	–5.10	$22,733.12
New Democratic	Jacob Wilson	1,554	21.36	+9.59	$28,624.28
Green	Madeleine Taylor	146	2.01	–2.61	$685.50
Total valid votes/expense limit		7,274	99.68	–	$77,511.59
Total rejected ballots		23	0.32		
Turnout		7,297	55.51		
Eligible voters		13,146			
Liberal notional hold		Swing		+1.61	
Source: Elections Nova Scotia

=== 2017 redistributed results ===
2017 provincial election redistributed results
Party	Vote	%
Liberal	3,596	52.74
Progressive Conservative	2,104	30.86
New Democratic	803	11.78
Green	315	4.62

== See also ==
- List of Nova Scotia provincial electoral districts
- Canadian provincial electoral districts
