= Claude Bourgeois =

Canadian politician

Claude Bourgeois MLA

Member of the House of Assembly for Chéticamp-Margarees-Pleasant Bay
- Incumbent
- Assumed office June 23, 2026
- Preceded by: District established

Personal details
- Party: Progressive Conservative
- Occupation: Businessman; politician

Claude Bourgeois is a Canadian politician who was elected to the Nova Scotia House of Assembly in a 2026 by-election, representing Chéticamp-Margarees-Pleasant Bay as a member of the Progressive Conservative Association of Nova Scotia. He is the first MLA for this district. He previously owned a local business.

== Electoral history ==
Nova Scotia provincial by-election, June 23, 2026: Chéticamp-Margarees-Pleasant Bay Creation of new seat due to court challenge
Party	Candidate	Votes	%	±%
Progressive Conservative	Claude Bourgeois	1,315	48.76	-4.45
Liberal	Denis Cormier	1,080	40.04	+6.13
New Democratic	Trevor Poirier	258	9.57	-3.31
Green	Nik Boisvert	44	1.63	
Total valid votes		2,697	98.83	
Total rejected ballots		32	1.17	
Turnout		2,729	68.81	
Eligible voters		3,966		
Progressive Conservative notional hold		Swing		-5.29
Source: Elections Nova Scotia
