= Hammonds Plains-Lucasville =

Provincial electoral district in Nova Scotia, Canada

Nova Scotia electoral district

Provincial electoral district
- Legislature: Nova Scotia House of Assembly
MLA
Rick Burns
Progressive Conservative
- District created: 2012
- First contested: 2013
- Last contested: 2024

Demographics
- Electors: 10,702
- Area (km²): 169
- Census division: Halifax Regional Municipality

Hammonds Plains-Lucasville is a provincial electoral district in Nova Scotia, Canada, that elects one member of the Nova Scotia House of Assembly. The riding was created in 2012 with 43 per cent of the former district of Hammonds Plains-Upper Sackville, 10 per cent of the district of Timberlea-Prospect and 7 per cent of the district of Chester-St. Margaret's.

== Geography ==
The electoral district of Hammonds Plains-Lucasville is about 169 km^{2} (65 sq mi) in landmass.

== Members of the Legislative Assembly ==
This riding has elected the following members of the Legislative Assembly:

Hammonds Plains-Lucasville
Legislature	Years	Member	Party
Riding created from Chester-St. Margaret's, Hammonds Plains-Upper Sackville and Timberlea-Prospect
62nd	2013–2017	Ben Jessome	Liberal
63rd	2017–2021	Ben Jessome	Liberal
64th	2021–2024	Ben Jessome	Liberal
65th	2024–present	Rick Burns	Progressive Conservative

== Election results ==
=== 2024 ===
2024 Nova Scotia general election
Party	Candidate	Votes	%	±%
Progressive Conservative	Rick Burns	3,508	46.31	+10.61
Liberal	Ben Jessome	3,105	40.99	-5.07
New Democratic	Terry J. Eyland	895	11.82	-4.79
Green	Roger Croll	67	0.88	-0.75
Total valid votes		7,575	–	
Total rejected ballots		23		
Turnout		7,598	47.99	
Eligible voters		15,831		
Progressive Conservative gain		Swing		
Source: Elections Nova Scotia

=== 2021 ===
2021 Nova Scotia general election
Party	Candidate	Votes	%	±%	Expenditures
Liberal	Ben Jessome	3,697	46.06	-0.62	$40,466.72
Progressive Conservative	Julie Chaisson	2,865	35.70	+2.77	$45,038.72
New Democratic	Angela Downey	1,333	16.61	+0.88	$23,701.20
Green	Mark Embrett	131	1.63	-3.02	$200.00
Total valid votes/expense limit		8,026	99.85	–	$82,459.24
Total rejected ballots		12	0.15		
Turnout		8,038	56.60		
Eligible voters		14,202			
Liberal hold		Swing		-1.70	
Source: Elections Nova Scotia

2017 provincial election redistributed results
Party	Vote	%
Liberal	3,359	46.69
Progressive Conservative	2,369	32.93
New Democratic	1,132	15.73
Green	335	4.66

=== 2017 ===
2017 Nova Scotia general election
Party	Candidate	Votes	%	±%
Liberal	Ben Jessome	3,432	46.69	-5.55
Progressive Conservative	Matt Whitman	2,421	32.94	+11.09
New Democratic	Paul McGuinness	1,157	15.74	-8.57
Green	Jessica Alexander	340	4.62	–
Total valid votes		7,350	100.00	–
Total rejected ballots		16	0.22	-0.15
Turnout		7,366	57.34	+0.29
Eligible voters		12,847		
Liberal hold		Swing		-8.32
Source: Elections Nova Scotia

=== 2013 ===
2013 Nova Scotia general election
Party	Candidate	Votes	%	±%
Liberal	Ben Jessome	3,402	52.23	–
New Democratic	Peter Lund	1,584	24.32	–
Progressive Conservative	Gina Byrne	1,423	21.85	–
Independent (Atlantica)	Jonathan G. Dean	104	1.60	–
Total		6,513	–	
Source: Elections Nova Scotia

== See also ==
- List of Nova Scotia provincial electoral districts
- Canadian provincial electoral districts
