= Kyle MacQuarrie =

Canadian politician

Member of the Nova Scotia House of Assembly for Inverness
- Incumbent
- Assumed office November 26, 2024
- Preceded by: Allan MacMaster

Personal details
- Party: Progressive Conservative Association of Nova Scotia

Kyle MacQuarrie is a Canadian politician who was elected to the Nova Scotia House of Assembly in the 2024 general election, representing Inverness as a member of the Progressive Conservative Association of Nova Scotia.

== Education ==
MacQuarrie graduated from Saint Mary’s University and Memorial University.

== Career ==
MacQuarrie is a former high school educator, information technology professional and small business owner.

== Electoral record ==
=== 2024 ===
2024 Nova Scotia general election: Inverness
Party	Candidate	Votes	%	±%
Progressive Conservative	Kyle MacQuarrie	4,058	57.63	+1.78
Liberal	Jaime Beaton	2,099	29.81	-6.15
New Democratic	Joanna Clark	884	12.56	+4.37
Total valid votes		7,041		
Total rejected ballots		70		
Turnout		7,111	48.93	
Eligible voters		14,534		
Progressive Conservative hold		Swing		
Source: Elections Nova Scotia
