= Dianne Timmins =

Canadian politician

Member of the Nova Scotia House of Assembly for Victoria-The Lakes
- Incumbent
- Assumed office November 26, 2024
- Preceded by: Keith Bain

Personal details
- Political party: Progressive Conservative Association of Nova Scotia

Dianne Timmins is a Canadian politician who was elected to the Nova Scotia House of Assembly in the 2024 general election, representing Victoria-The Lakes as a member of the Progressive Conservative Association of Nova Scotia.
