= 2022 Nova Scotia New Democratic Party leadership election =

Nova Scotia New Democratic Party leadership election

2022 Nova Scotia New Democratic leadership election
- June 25, 2022
| Candidate | Claudia Chender |
| Riding | Dartmouth South |
| First Ballot | Majority Vote |
Leader before election
Gary Burrill
Elected Leader
Claudia Chender

2022 Nova Scotia New Democratic Party leadership election
- Date: June 25, 2022
- Convention: Dartmouth DoubleTree Hotel
- Resigning leader: Gary Burrill
- Won by: Claudia Chender
- Ballots: 1
- Candidates: 1
- Entrance fee: $10,000
- Spending limit: $60,000

The 2022 Nova Scotia New Democratic Party leadership election took place on June 25, 2022 to elect a leader to replace Gary Burrill, who announced his intention to resign on November 9, 2021 after leading the party since 2016 and following the party's defeat in the 2021 Nova Scotia general election.

As the only candidate in the race by the May 21, 2022 deadline, Dartmouth South MLA Claudia Chender was expected to be chosen as leader. At the party convention in Dartmouth on June 25, 2022, Chender was approved by party members and elected as leader.

== Background ==
Gary Burrill announced that he would resign as leader on November 9, 2021, following the party's defeat in the 2021 general election. Burrill remained as acting leader of the Nova Scotia New Democratic Party until his successor was chosen.

== Timeline ==
=== 2021 ===
- November 9 – Gary Burrill announces his resignation as leader of the Nova Scotia New Democratic Party.

=== 2022 ===
- January 29 – The party unveils the base set of rules for the election.
- February 14 – Claudia Chender declares her candidacy
- May 21 – Deadline for candidates to submit nomination.
- May 30 – Last day to become an eligible party member.
- June 25 – Leadership convention is held in Dartmouth.

== Candidates ==
=== Claudia Chender ===
Claudia Chender is the MLA for Dartmouth South, having served since 2017. Prior to announcing her candidacy, Chender served as NDP House Leader and Caucus Spokesperson for Economic Development, Justice, Status of Women, Natural Resources & Renewables, and Fisheries & Aquaculture. Chender is also a lawyer and has worked in both the not-for-profit and private sectors.

Candidacy announced: February 14, 2022
Campaign website: www.claudiaforleader.ca

Endorsements of Claudia Chender (5)

MLAs:

- Lisa Lachance (MLA for Halifax Citadel-Sable Island, 2021-Present; Deputy Speaker of the Nova Scotia House of Assembly, 2021-Present)
- Susan Leblanc (MLA for Dartmouth North, 2017-Present)

Federal politicians:
Municipal politicians:
Former MLAs:

- Pam Birdsall (Former MLA for Lunenburg, 2009-2013)
- Lisa Roberts (Former MLA for Halifax Needham, 2016-2021)

Former federal politicians:
Former municipal politicians:
Riding Association Executives:
Other prominent individuals:

- Juanita Peters (Director of the Africville Heritage Museum)

Total endorsements: 5

=== Declined ===
- Kendra Coombes, MLA for Cape Breton Centre-Whitney Pier (2020-).
- Suzy Hansen, MLA for Halifax Needham (2021-).
- Lisa Lachance, MLA for Halifax Citadel-Sable Island (2021-); Deputy Speaker of the Nova Scotia House of Assembly (2021-). (Endorsed Chender)
- Susan Leblanc, MLA for Dartmouth North (2017-). (Endorsed Chender)
