= Rick Burns =

Canadian politician

Member of the Nova Scotia House of Assembly for Hammonds Plains-Lucasville
- Incumbent
- Assumed office November 26, 2024
- Preceded by: Ben Jessome

Personal details
- Party: Progressive Conservative Association of Nova Scotia

Rick Burns is a Canadian politician who was elected to the Nova Scotia House of Assembly in the 2024 general election, representing Hammonds Plains-Lucasville as a member of the Progressive Conservative Association of Nova Scotia.
