= Tim Outhit =

Canadian politician

Member of the Nova Scotia House of Assembly for Bedford Basin
- Incumbent
- Assumed office November 26, 2024
- Preceded by: Kelly Regan

Personal details
- Political party: Progressive Conservative Association of Nova Scotia

Tim Outhit is a Canadian politician who was elected to the Nova Scotia House of Assembly in the 2024 general election, representing Bedford Basin as a member of the Progressive Conservative Association of Nova Scotia.

He previously represented Bedford at Halifax Regional Council for 15 years.

== Education ==
Outhit attended Dalhousie University, Queen's University, York University, and the University of Toronto.
