= Nick Hilton =

Canadian politician

Member of the Nova Scotia House of Assembly for Yarmouth
- Incumbent
- Assumed office November 26, 2024
- Preceded by: Zach Churchill

Personal details
- Born: Nicholas Peter Hilton; September 26, 1983 (age 42)
- Party: Progressive Conservative

Nicholas "Nick" Peter Hilton (born September 26, 1983) is a Canadian politician representing Yarmouth in the Nova Scotia House of Assembly for the Progressive Conservative Association of Nova Scotia. He unseated Leader of the Opposition Zach Churchill by 14 votes.

Hilton has been a licensed practical nurse since 2002 with more than 20 years of experience working at the Yarmouth Regional Hospital. Prior to being elected, he served as councillor for District 7 in the Municipality of the District of Yarmouth, president of the Yarmouth Links Golf & Country Club, and curling director for the Yarmouth Curling Association.

== Electoral record ==
2024 Nova Scotia general election: Yarmouth
Party	Candidate	Votes	%	±%
Progressive Conservative	Nick Hilton	3,663	48.32	+11.29
Liberal	Zach Churchill	3,647	48.11	-8.21
New Democratic	Gillian Rowley	208	2.74	-1.43
Green	Adam Randall	62	0.82	-1.66
Total valid votes		7,580	99.59	
Total rejected ballots		31	0.41	0.00
Turnout		7,611	52.68	-2.07
Eligible voters		14,447		
Progressive Conservative gain from Liberal		Swing		+9.77
Source: Elections Nova Scotia
