= Adegoke Fadare =

Canadian politician

Member of the Nova Scotia House of Assembly for Clayton Park West
- Incumbent
- Assumed office November 26, 2024
- Preceded by: Rafah DiCostanzo

Personal details
- Party: Progressive Conservative Association of Nova Scotia

Adegoke Fadare is a Canadian politician who was elected to the Nova Scotia House of Assembly in the 2024 general election, representing Clayton Park West as a member of the Progressive Conservative Association of Nova Scotia.

Fadare is the former president of the Association of Nigerians in Nova Scotia.
