= David Bowlby =

Canadian politician

Member of the Nova Scotia House of Assembly for Annapolis
- Incumbent
- Assumed office November 26, 2024
- Preceded by: Carman Kerr

Personal details
- Born: December 10, 1966 (age 59)
- Party: Progressive Conservative Association of Nova Scotia

David Lee Bowlby (born December 10, 1966) is a Canadian politician who was elected to the Nova Scotia House of Assembly in the 2024 general election, representing Annapolis as a member of the Progressive Conservative Association of Nova Scotia.

Bowlby was raised in rural Nova Scotia on a fifth generation farm.
