= Leah Martin =

Canadian politician

The Honourable Leah Martin ECNS MLA

Member of the Nova Scotia House of Assembly for Cole Harbour
- Incumbent
- Assumed office November 26, 2024
- Preceded by: Tony Ince

Personal details
- Born: Leah Girdwood; November 2, 1986 (age 39)
- Party: Progressive Conservative
- Education: Dalhousie University

Leah (Girdwood) Martin (born November 2, 1986) is a Canadian politician who was elected to the Nova Scotia House of Assembly in the 2024 general election. She represents Cole Harbour as a member of the Progressive Conservative Association of Nova Scotia.

On December 12, 2024, Martin was appointed to the Executive Council of Nova Scotia as Minister of Communications Nova Scotia, L'nu affairs, and the minister responsible for the Advisory Council on the Status of Women Act and youth.

Martin is a member of the Millbrook First Nation and is the first Mi'kmaw person elected to the Nova Scotia House of Assembly. She played basketball for the Dalhousie Tigers and graduated from the Dalhousie University with a Bachelor of Arts in Sociology.
