= 2024 Nova Scotia general election =

Canadian provincial election

- November 26, 2024

55 seats in the Nova Scotia House of Assembly 28 seats needed for a majority
- Opinion polls
- Turnout: 45.19% (▼9.88 pp)
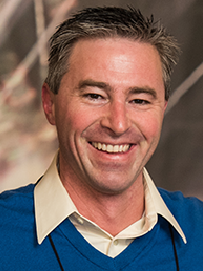

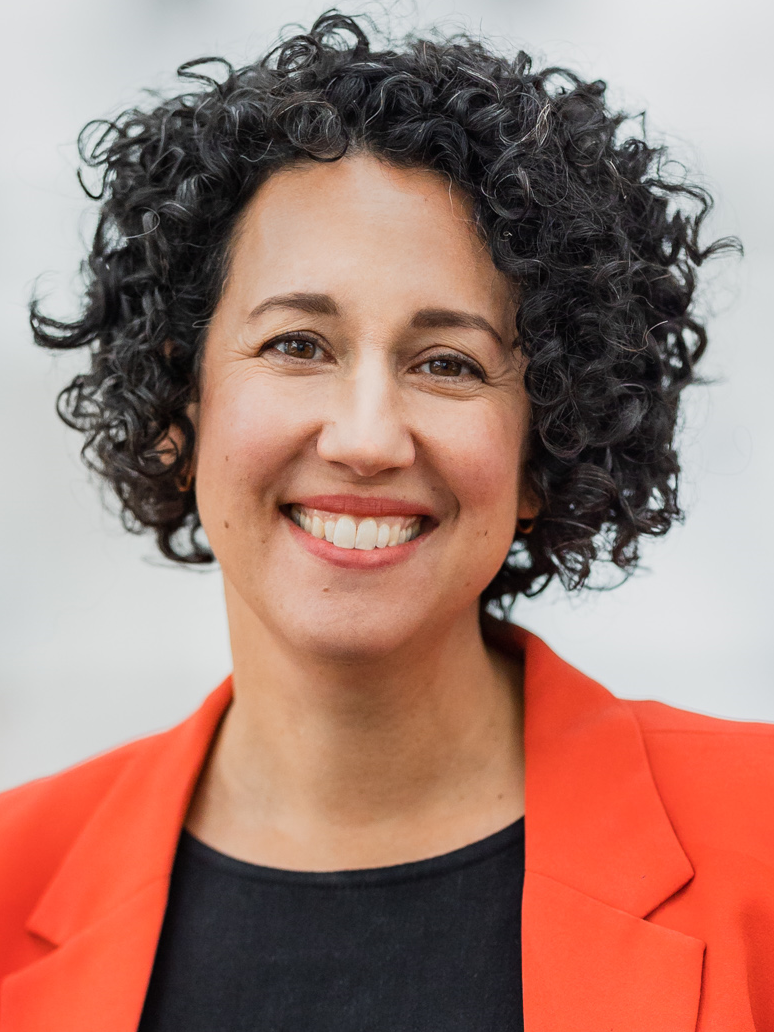

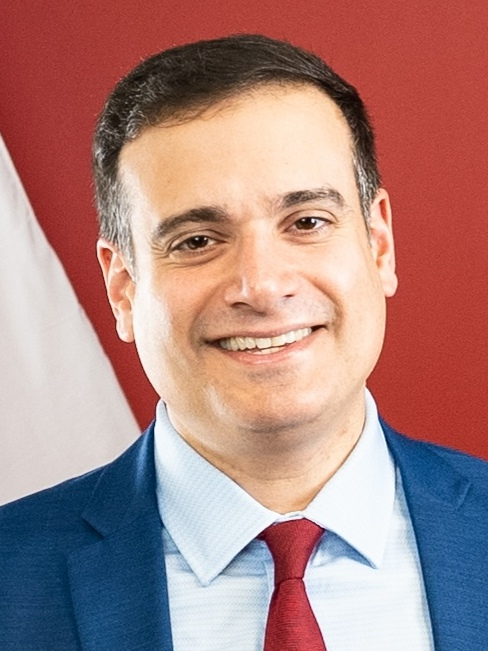
	Majority party	Minority party	Third party
Leader	Tim Houston	Claudia Chender	Zach Churchill
Party	Progressive Conservative	New Democratic	Liberal
Leader since	October 27, 2018	June 25, 2022	July 9, 2022
Leader's seat	Pictou East	Dartmouth South	Yarmouth (lost re-election)
Last election	31 seats, 38.44%	6 seats, 20.93%	17 seats, 36.67%
Seats before	34	6	14
Seats won	43	9	2
Seat change	▲9	▲3	▼12
Popular vote	187,047	79,008	80,854
Percentage	52.49%	22.17%	22.69%
Swing	▲14.05 pp	▲1.24 pp	▼13.98 pp
Premier before election
Tim Houston
Progressive Conservative
Premier after election
Tim Houston
Progressive Conservative

The 2024 Nova Scotia general election was held on November 26, 2024, to elect members to the 65th General Assembly of Nova Scotia. The election was held under first-past-the-post voting.

The incumbent Progressive Conservative Association of Nova Scotia (PC) government, led by Premier Tim Houston since 2021, called a snap election and won a second consecutive majority government. It is the first time since 1984 that the PCs won over half of the popular vote, and a supermajority (i.e., greater than two-thirds) of seats in the General Assembly means that it can alter procedural rules without the collaboration of the other parties. In raw numbers (but not proportion of seats), this is the largest government caucus they have ever had. The Nova Scotia New Democratic Party, led by Claudia Chender, formed the official opposition for the first time since 2006, though they narrowly came in third in votes. The Nova Scotia Liberal Party, led by Zach Churchill, recorded its worst result in party history.

This election had the lowest turnout in Nova Scotia history, with only 45% of those eligible participating. This was the first Nova Scotia general election where less than half of eligible voters cast their vote.

== Background ==
During the 2021 election, the Progressive Conservatives included a commitment in their platform to introduce fixed election dates in the province. Under amendments to the provincial Elections Act introduced and passed in October 2021, the first fixed election date following the 2021 Nova Scotia general election was set as 15 July 2025 with all subsequent elections to take place on the third Tuesday in July of the fourth calendar year following the previous election. However, the general assembly may be dissolved earlier by order of the lieutenant governor of Nova Scotia on the advice of the premier, which was the case for this election.

Standings in the 64th General Assembly
Affiliation	House members	
Affiliation	2021 election results	At dissolution
Progressive Conservative	31	34
Liberal	17	14
New Democratic	6	6
Independent	1	1
Vacant	0	0

=== Incumbents not standing for re-election ===
The following MLAs announced that they would not run in the election:

Party	MLA	Riding
Liberal	Rafah DiCostanzo	Clayton Park West
Liberal	Tony Ince	Cole Harbour
Liberal	Keith Irving	Kings South
Liberal	Lorelei Nicoll	Cole Harbour-Dartmouth
Liberal	Kelly Regan	Bedford Basin
New Democratic	Gary Burrill	Halifax Chebucto
PC	Keith Bain	Victoria-The Lakes
PC	Steve Craig	Sackville-Cobequid
PC	Pat Dunn	Pictou Centre
PC	Larry Harrison	Colchester-Musquodoboit Valley
PC	Allan MacMaster	Inverness

== Timeline ==
- August 17, 2021 – The Progressive Conservative Association, led by Tim Houston, wins the 2021 Nova Scotia general election, the Liberal Party becomes the official opposition, and the New Democratic Party remains at third party status.
- October 23, 2021 - Anthony Edmonds is elected leader and Jo-Ann Roberts is elected deputy leader of the Green Party of Nova Scotia.
- November 9, 2021 – Gary Burrill, leader of the Nova Scotia New Democratic Party, announces his resignation, triggering a leadership election for the party.
- December 16, 2021 – Nova Scotians United becomes Nova Scotia's newest registered political party.
- January 5, 2022 – Iain Rankin, leader of the Nova Scotia Liberal Party, announces his resignation, triggering a leadership election for the party.
- June 25, 2022 – Claudia Chender is elected leader of the Nova Scotia New Democratic Party.
- July 9, 2022 – Zach Churchill is elected leader of the Nova Scotia Liberal Party.
- April 30, 2024 – The Atlantica Party is voluntarily deregistered by Elections Nova Scotia.
- October 22, 2024 – Liberal Fred Tilley crosses the floor to the Nova Scotia Progressive Conservatives.
- October 27, 2024 – Premier Tim Houston calls a general election for November 26, 2024.
- November 6, 2024 – Candidate nomination deadline.
- November 26, 2024 – General election held, resulting in a majority government for the Progressive Conservatives.
Changes in seats held (2021–2024)

Seat	Before				Change		
Seat	Date	Member	Party	Reason	Date	Member	Party
Preston	April 1, 2023	Angela Simmonds	█ Liberal	Resignation	August 8, 2023	Twila Grosse	█ PC
Halifax Atlantic	February 22, 2024	Brendan Maguire	█ Liberal	Joined Progressive Conservative caucus			█ PC
Pictou West	April 12, 2024	Karla MacFarlane	█ PC	Resignation	May 21, 2024	Marco MacLeod	█ PC
Northside-Westmount	October 22, 2024	Fred Tilley	█ Liberal	Joined Progressive Conservative caucus			█ PC

== Campaign ==
=== Contests ===
Candidate contests in the ridings
Candidates nominated	Ridings	Party					
Candidates nominated	Ridings	PC	Lib	NDP	Green	Ind	Totals
3	30	30	30	29	0	1	90
4	24	24	24	24	22	2	96
5	1	1	1	1	1	1	5
Total	55	55	55	54	23	4	191

=== Leaders' debates ===
2024 Nova Scotia general election debates
Date	Organizers	Venue	Moderator(s)	P Participant A Absent invitee N Non-invitee					Source
Date	Organizers	Venue	Moderator(s)	PC	Liberal	NDP	Green	NSU	Source
November 14, 2024	CBC Nova Scotia	CBC Studios, Halifax	Tom Murphy, Amy Smith	P Houston	P Churchill	P Chender	N Edmonds	N Baker	
November 21, 2024	CTV Atlantic	CTV Studios, Halifax	Todd Battis	P Houston	P Churchill	P Chender	N Edmonds	N Baker	

== Results ==
Two judicial recounts took place in December:

Recount results
Constituency	Date held	Reason	Confirmed
Yarmouth	December 9	on request of the losing incumbent	✓
Annapolis	December 10	automatic due to narrowness of margin	✓

=== Results by party ===
Summary of the 2024 Nova Scotia House of Assembly election
Party	Leader	Candidates	Votes				Seats		
Party	Leader	Candidates	#	±	%	Change (pp)	2021	2024	±
Progressive Conservative	Tim Houston	55	187,047	24,574▲	52.49	14.05	31	43 / 55	12▲
Liberal	Zach Churchill	55	80,854	74,172▼	22.69	-13.98	17	2 / 55	15▼
New Democratic	Claudia Chender	54	79,008	9,469▼	22.17	1.24	6	9 / 55	3▲
Green	Anthony Edmonds	23	2,941	6,101▼	0.83	-1.31			
Independent		4	4,220	740▼	1.18	0.10	1	1 / 55	Steady
Total			354,070		100.00%				
Rejected ballots			2,250	539▲					
Turnout			356,320	66,392▼	45.19	9.88▼			
Registered voters			788,427	20,809▲					

=== Synopsis of results ===
Results by riding - 2024 Nova Scotia general election
Riding	Winning party								Turnout (Note: including spoilt ballots)	Votes					
Riding	2021	1st place	Votes	Share	Margin #	Margin %	2nd place	3rd place	Turnout	PC	Lib	NDP	Grn	Ind	Total
Annapolis	Lib	PC	3,289	44.46%	8	0.11%	Lib	NDP	46.43%	3,289	3,281	689	138	–	7,397
Antigonish	PC	PC	5,202	64.82%	3,482	43.39%	Lib	NDP	52.37%	5,202	1,720	1,103	–	–	8,025
Argyle (Note: Historically Acadian riding)	PC	PC	3,383	85.65%	2,944	74.53%	Lib	NDP	57.86%	3,383	439	67	61	–	3,950
Bedford Basin	Lib	PC	3,692	60.15%	2,382	38.81%	Lib	NDP	46.76%	3,692	1,310	1,136	–	–	6,138
Bedford South	Lib	PC	2,888	41.25%	102	1.46%	Lib	NDP	42.62%	2,888	2,786	1,243	85	–	7,002
Cape Breton Centre-Whitney Pier	NDP	NDP	3,212	48.60%	536	8.11%	PC	Lib	45.00%	2,676	721	3,212	–	–	6,609
Cape Breton East	PC	PC	4,250	61.34%	2,513	36.27%	Lib	NDP	48.50%	4,250	1,737	942	–	–	6,929
Chester-St. Margaret's	PC	PC	4,806	58.21%	2,646	32.05%	Lib	NDP	50.36%	4,806	2,160	1,290	–	–	8,256
Clare	Lib	PC	2,805	59.71%	1,015	21.60%	Lib	NDP	65.35%	2,805	1,790	103	–	–	4,698
Clayton Park West	Lib	PC	2,096	35.41%	86	1.45%	NDP	Lib	40.75%	2,096	1,813	2,010	–	–	5,919
Colchester-Musquodoboit Valley	PC	PC	4,030	67.53%	2,919	48.91%	NDP	Lib	38.71%	4,030	827	1,111	–	–	5,968
Colchester North	PC	PC	4,282	67.79%	3,220	50.97%	NDP	Lib	39.96%	4,282	828	1,062	145	–	6,317
Cole Harbour	Lib	PC	1,986	42.28%	238	5.07%	NDP	Lib	46.58%	1,986	893	1,748	70	–	4,697
Cole Harbour-Dartmouth	Lib	PC	4,243	51.64%	2,164	26.34%	NDP	Lib	49.17%	4,243	1,894	2,079	–	–	8,216
Cumberland North	Ind	Ind	3,567	55.29%	1,373	21.28%	PC	Lib	45.44%	2,194	414	277	–	3,567	6,452
Cumberland South	PC	PC	3,442	77.21%	2,902	65.10%	Lib	NDP	38.07%	3,442	540	476 (Note: Larry Duchesne was previously the leader of the Prince Edward Island New Democratic Party.)	–	–	4,458
Dartmouth East	PC	PC	3,167	44.17%	932	13.00%	NDP	Lib	49.48%	3,167	1,768	2,235	–	–	7,170
Dartmouth North	NDP	NDP	3,698	62.92%	2,345	39.90%	PC	Lib	36.36%	1,353	826	3,698	–	–	5,877
Dartmouth South	NDP	NDP	4,415	68.46%	2,966	45.99%	PC	Lib	47.43%	1,449	585	4,415	–	–	6,449
Digby-Annapolis	PC	PC	3,300	73.22%	2,446	54.27%	Lib	NDP	41.65%	3,300	854	353	–	–	4,507
Eastern Passage	PC	PC	2,754	63.75%	1,644	38.06%	Lib	Ind	40.82%	2,754	1,110	–	–	456 (Note: Tammy Jakeman was previously an NDP candidate in 2021.)	4,320
Eastern Shore	PC	PC	4,690	62.05%	3,249	42.98%	Lib	NDP	42.90%	4,690	1,441	1,231	197	–	7,559
Fairview-Clayton Park	Lib	NDP	2,429	38.98%	406	6.52%	PC	Lib	39.63%	2,023	1,779	2,429	–	–	6,231
Glace Bay-Dominion	PC	PC	4,187	72.31%	3,178	54.89%	Lib	NDP	43.79%	4,187	1,009	594	–	–	5,790
Guysborough–Tracadie	PC	PC	3,128	77.46%	2,538	62.85%	Lib	NDP	50.86%	3,128	590	320	–	–	4,038
Halifax Armdale	Lib	NDP	2,521	39.40%	241	3.77%	PC	Lib	44.66%	2,280	1,597	2,521	–	–	6,398
Halifax Atlantic	Lib	PC	3,879	57.41%	1,996	29.54%	NDP	Lib	41.24%	3,879	911	1,883	84	–	6,757
Halifax Chebucto	NDP	NDP	3,682	53.99%	2,105	30.87%	PC	Lib	53.60%	1,577	1,441	3,682	120	–	6,820
Halifax Citadel-Sable Island	NDP	NDP	3,903	52.67%	1,995	26.92%	PC	Lib	41.73%	1,908	1,440	3,903	159	–	7,410
Halifax Needham	NDP	NDP	5,126	68.03%	3,847	51.06%	PC	Lib	43.49%	1,279	1,003	5,126	127	–	7,535
Hammonds Plains-Lucasville	Lib	PC	3,508	46.31%	403	5.32%	Lib	NDP	47.99%	3,508	3,105	895	67	–	7,575
Hants East	PC	PC	4,614	62.69%	2,918	39.65%	NDP	Lib	38.66%	4,614	1,050	1,696	–	–	7,360
Hants West	PC	PC	4,253	52.59%	1,632	20.18%	Lib	NDP	45.91%	4,253	2,621	1,120	–	93	8,087
Inverness	PC	PC	4,058	57.63%	1,959	27.82%	Lib	NDP	48.93%	4,058	2,099	884	–	–	7,041
Kings North	PC	PC	4,047	53.67%	1,952	25.89%	NDP	Lib	44.17%	4,047	1,260	2,095	139	–	7,541
Kings South	Lib	PC	3,372	41.77%	1,046	12.96%	NDP	Lib	46.03%	3,372	2,230	2,326	144	–	8,072
Kings West	PC	PC	5,226	72.78%	4,152	57.82%	Lib	NDP	39.68%	5,226	1,074	714	167	–	7,181
Lunenburg	PC	PC	4,308	60.16%	2,812	39.27%	Lib	NDP	46.54%	4,308	1,496	1,185	172	–	7,161
Lunenburg West	PC	PC	4,239	56.28%	1,937	25.72%	Lib	NDP	43.98%	4,239	2,302	846	145	–	7,532
Northside-Westmount	Lib	PC	4,978	67.89%	3,303	45.05%	Lib	NDP	45.05%	4,978	1,675	679	–	–	7,332
Pictou Centre	PC	PC	3,741	67.61%	2,769	50.05%	Lib	NDP	41.11%	3,741	972	820	–	–	5,533
Pictou East	PC	PC	4,424	78.89%	3,768	67.19%	NDP	Lib	46.40%	4,424	528	656	–	–	5,608
Pictou West	PC	PC	4,325	74.08%	3,547	60.76%	Lib	NDP	47.74%	4,325	778	620	115	–	5,838
Preston (Note: Historically Black riding)	Lib	PC	2,139	51.41%	925	22.23%	NDP	Lib	37.88%	2,139	739	1,214	69	–	4,161
Queens	PC	PC	3,461	79.93%	2,974	68.68%	Lib	NDP	46.65%	3,461	487	382	–	–	4,330
Richmond	PC	PC	3,496	70.84%	2,275	46.10%	Lib	NDP	61.13%	3,496	1,221	218	–	–	4,935
Sackville-Cobequid	PC	NDP	2,834	44.78%	63	1.00%	PC	Lib	42.26%	2,771	724	2,834	–	–	6,329
Sackville-Uniacke	PC	PC	2,925	48.99%	396	6.63%	NDP	Lib	42.58%	2,925	517	2,529	–	–	5,971
Shelburne	PC	PC	3,092	76.80%	2,610	64.83%	NDP	Lib	34.32%	3,092	452	482	–	–	4,026
Sydney-Membertou	Lib	Lib	3,691	45.05%	786	9.59%	PC	NDP	53.01%	2,905	3,691	1,513	85	–	8,194
Timberlea-Prospect	Lib	Lib	4,969	54.89%	2,079	22.96%	PC	NDP	49.54%	2,890	4,969	1,062	132	–	9,053
Truro-Bible Hill-Millbrook-Salmon River	PC	PC	4,034	67.76%	2,967	49.84%	NDP	Lib	35.27%	4,034	852	1,067	–	–	5,953
Victoria-The Lakes	PC	PC	3,685	65.45%	2,467	43.82%	Lib	NDP	42.93%	3,685	1,218	510	113	104	5,630
Waverley-Fall River-Beaver Bank	PC	PC	4,653	56.70%	3,018	36.77%	Lib	NDP	45.20%	4,653	1,635	1,575	344	–	8,207
Yarmouth	Lib	PC	3,663	48.32%	16	0.21%	Lib	NDP	52.26%	3,663	3,647	208	62	–	7,580

= Open seat
= Turnout is above provincial average
= Winning candidate was in previous Legislature
= Incumbent had switched allegiance
= Previously incumbent in another riding
= Not incumbent; was previously elected to the Legislature
= Incumbency arose from byelection gain
= Other incumbents renominated
= Previously an MP in the House of Commons of Canada
= Previously a member of another provincial/territorial legislature

=== Comparative analysis for ridings (2024 vs 2021) ===
==== Analytical charts ====
Ternary plots of election results
2021

2024
Electoral districts won identified by PC (blue), Liberal (red) and NDP (orange).
2024 vs 2021

2024 (by winning party)
2024 vs 2021

2024 (by party finishing second)
2024 vs 2021

2024
2024 vs 2021

2024 (by winning party)

==== Turnout, winning shares and swings ====
Summary of riding results by turnout, vote share for winning candidate, and swing (vs 2021)
Riding and winning party			Turnout		Vote share (Note: Share won by winning candidate, with difference noted from share achieved by the same party in 2021.)		Swing (Note: Positive indicates improvement to standing of party winning in 2021; negative points to 2021's second-place party being swung to.)		
Riding and winning party			%	Change (pp)	%	Change (pp)	From	To	Change (pp)
Annapolis	PC	Gain	46.43	-11.37	44.46	12.17	Lib	PC	-8.72
Antigonish	PC	Hold	52.37	-12.41	64.82	14.84	Lib	PC	12.62
Argyle	PC	Hold	57.86	-9.68	85.65	3.29	Lib	PC	3.26
Bedford Basin	PC	Gain	46.76	-8.85	60.15	34.39	Lib	PC	-31.96
Bedford South	PC	Gain	42.62	-13.41	41.25	11.51	Lib	PC	-8.55
Cape Breton Centre-Whitney Pier	NDP	Hold	45.00	-8.66	48.60	6.45	Lib	NDP	18.07
Cape Breton East	PC	Hold	48.50	-12.92	61.34	15.07	Lib	PC	13.37
Chester-St. Margaret's	PC	Hold	50.36	-12.12	58.21	18.15	Lib	PC	14.80
Clare	PC	Gain	65.35	-2.49	59.71	16.28	Lib	PC	-14.04
Clayton Park West	PC	Gain	40.75	-11.88	35.41	10.64	Lib	PC	-13.80
Colchester-Musquodoboit Valley	PC	Hold	38.71	-13.65	67.53	12.40	Lib	PC	12.08
Colchester North	PC	Hold	39.96	-16.71	67.79	14.61	Lib	PC	16.67
Cole Harbour	PC	Gain	46.58	-6.72	42.28	10.30	Lib	PC	-15.52
Cole Harbour-Dartmouth	PC	Gain	49.17	-12.45	51.64	21.90	Lib	PC	-25.54
Cumberland North	Ind	Hold	45.44	-13.15	55.29	1.41	Lib	Ind	13.32
Cumberland South	PC	Hold	38.07	-14.05	77.21	8.74	Lib	PC	7.90
Dartmouth East	PC	Hold	49.48	-7.96	44.17	5.18	Lib	PC	7.60
Dartmouth North	NDP	Hold	36.36	-9.66	62.92	13.17	Lib	NDP	15.30
Dartmouth South	NDP	Hold	47.43	-5.53	68.46	10.33	Lib	NDP	11.70
Digby-Annapolis	PC	Hold	41.65	-11.33	73.22	23.67	Lib	PC	19.89
Eastern Passage	PC	Hold	40.82	-11.83	63.75	18.93	Lib	PC	9.72
Eastern Shore	PC	Hold	42.90	-14.02	62.05	16.22	Lib	PC	15.61
Fairview-Clayton Park	NDP	Gain	39.63	-7.95	38.98	1.87	Lib	NDP	-5.91
Glace Bay-Dominion	PC	Hold	43.79	-15.58	72.31	37.71	NDP	PC	30.85
Guysborough–Tracadie	PC	Hold	50.86	-15.95	77.46	14.08	Lib	PC	14.91
Halifax Armdale	NDP	Gain	44.66	-9.36	39.40	5.32	Lib	NDP	-10.36
Halifax Atlantic	PC	Gain	41.24	-6.03	57.41	37.84	Lib	NDP	-23.40
Halifax Chebucto	NDP	Hold	53.60	-8.41	53.99	2.00	Lib	NDP	6.50
Halifax Citadel-Sable Island	NDP	Hold	41.73	-7.19	52.67	10.36	Lib	NDP	13.87
Halifax Needham	NDP	Hold	43.49	-9.85	68.03	9.06	Lib	NDP	12.41
Hammonds Plains-Lucasville	PC	Gain	47.99	-9.44	46.31	10.61	Lib	PC	-7.84
Hants East	PC	Hold	38.66	-12.53	62.69	25.33	Lib	PC	23.71
Hants West	PC	Hold	45.91	-10.07	52.59	9.48	Lib	PC	9.32
Inverness	PC	Hold	48.93	-12.65	57.63	1.78	Lib	PC	3.97
Kings North	PC	Hold	44.17	-11.13	53.67	8.96	Lib	PC	10.77
Kings South	PC	Gain	46.03	-9.67	41.77	8.59	Lib	PC	-12.54
Kings West	PC	Hold	39.68	-16.97	72.78	23.33	Lib	PC	24.95
Lunenburg	PC	Hold	46.54	-11.60	60.16	18.15	Lib	PC	15.91
Lunenburg West	PC	Hold	43.98	-11.67	56.28	11.86	Lib	PC	8.12
Northside-Westmount	PC	Gain	45.05	-8.29	67.89	31.38	Lib	PC	-27.70
Pictou Centre	PC	Hold	41.11	-15.96	67.61	11.84	Lib	PC	12.60
Pictou East	PC	Hold	46.40	-15.04	78.89	9.21	Lib	PC	11.12
Pictou West	PC	Hold	47.74	-14.36	74.08	10.47	Lib	PC	9.27
Preston	PC	Gain	37.88	-8.90	51.41	22.72	Lib	PC	-24.17
Queens	PC	Hold	46.65	-11.71	79.93	9.56	Lib	PC	9.35
Richmond	PC	Hold	61.13	-10.48	70.84	19.98	Lib	PC	16.04
Sackville-Cobequid	NDP	Gain	42.26	-9.48	44.78	12.19	PC	NDP	-5.87
Sackville-Uniacke	PC	Hold	42.58	-8.86	48.99	5.16	Lib	PC	14.65
Shelburne	PC	Hold	34.32	-20.18	76.80	14.24	Lib	PC	13.39
Sydney-Membertou	Lib	Hold	53.01	0.35	45.05	-9.22	NDP	Lib	0.30
Timberlea-Prospect	Lib	Hold	49.54	-6.14	54.89	0.51	Lib	PC	-3.53
Truro-Bible Hill-Millbrook-Salmon River	PC	Hold	35.27	-15.84	67.76	19.92	Lib	PC	17.91
Victoria-The Lakes	PC	Hold	42.93	-8.57	65.45	11.08	Lib	PC	11.82
Waverley-Fall River-Beaver Bank	PC	Hold	45.20	-11.35	56.70	16.32	Lib	PC	16.38
Yarmouth	PC	Gain	52.26	-2.91	48.32	11.30	Lib	PC	-9.75

==== Share changes by party ====
Share change analysis by party and riding (2024 vs 2021)
Riding	PC		Liberal		NDP	
Riding	%	Change (pp)	%	Change (pp)	%	Change (pp)
Annapolis	44.46	12.17	44.36	-5.27	9.31	-3.90
Antigonish	64.82	14.84	21.43	-10.39	13.74	-2.73
Argyle	85.65	3.29	11.11	-3.22	1.70	0.27
Bedford Basin	60.15	34.39	21.34	-29.52	18.51	-2.86
Bedford South	41.25	11.51	39.79	-5.58	17.75	-4.67
Cape Breton Centre-Whitney Pier	40.49	24.17	10.91	-29.70	48.60	6.45
Cape Breton East	61.34	15.07	25.07	-11.66	13.60	-3.41
Chester-St. Margaret's	58.21	18.15	26.16	-11.45	15.63	-1.57
Clare	59.71	16.28	38.10	-11.79	2.19	-1.10
Clayton Park West	35.41	10.64	30.63	-16.97	33.96	9.70
Colchester-Musquodoboit Valley	67.53	12.40	13.86	-11.76	18.62	-0.64
Colchester North	67.79	14.61	13.11	-18.74	16.81	5.47
Cole Harbour	42.28	10.30	19.01	-20.74	37.22	10.36
Cole Harbour-Dartmouth	51.64	21.90	23.05	-29.19	25.30	9.48
Cumberland North	34.00	26.77	6.42	-25.23	4.29	-2.95
Cumberland South	77.21	8.74	12.11	-7.06	10.68	1.48
Dartmouth East	44.17	5.18	24.66	-10.02	31.17	7.56
Dartmouth North	23.02	5.98	14.05	-17.43	62.92	13.17
Dartmouth South	22.47	5.04	9.07	-13.07	68.46	10.33
Digby-Annapolis	73.22	23.67	18.95	-16.11	7.83	-3.93
Eastern Passage	63.75	18.93	25.69	-0.52	–	-22.18
Eastern Shore	62.05	16.22	19.06	-14.99	16.29	-1.10
Fairview-Clayton Park	32.47	10.12	28.55	-9.96	38.98	1.87
Glace Bay-Dominion	72.31	37.71	17.43	-13.72	10.26	-23.98
Guysborough–Tracadie	77.46	14.08	14.61	-15.74	7.92	3.15
Halifax Armdale	35.64	13.54	24.96	-15.39	39.40	5.32
Halifax Atlantic	57.41	37.84	13.48	-41.74	27.87	5.06
Halifax Chebucto	23.12	11.31	21.13	-11.01	53.99	2.00
Halifax Citadel-Sable Island	25.75	8.00	19.43	-17.39	52.67	10.36
Halifax Needham	16.97	6.93	13.31	-15.76	68.03	9.06
Hammonds Plains-Lucasville	46.31	10.61	40.99	-5.07	11.82	-4.79
Hants East	62.69	25.33	14.27	-22.09	23.04	-1.00
Hants West	52.59	9.48	32.41	-9.17	13.85	2.82
Inverness	57.63	1.78	29.81	-6.15	12.56	4.37
Kings North	53.67	8.96	16.71	-12.58	27.78	6.66
Kings South	41.77	8.59	27.63	-16.49	28.82	9.12
Kings West	72.78	23.33	14.96	-26.56	9.94	4.03
Lunenburg	60.16	18.15	20.89	-13.66	16.55	-4.19
Lunenburg West	56.28	11.86	30.56	-4.37	11.23	-7.44
Northside-Westmount	67.89	31.38	22.85	-24.02	9.26	-7.37
Pictou Centre	67.61	11.84	17.57	-13.36	14.82	3.07
Pictou East	78.89	9.21	9.42	-13.04	11.70	4.61
Pictou West	74.08	10.47	13.33	-8.08	10.62	-1.74
Preston	51.41	22.72	17.76	-25.62	29.18	1.25
Queens	79.93	9.56	11.25	-9.14	8.82	2.56
Richmond	70.84	19.98	24.74	-12.11	4.42	-0.61
Sackville-Cobequid	43.78	0.45	11.44	-10.07	44.78	12.19
Sackville-Uniacke	48.99	5.16	8.66	-24.14	42.35	20.68
Shelburne	76.80	14.24	11.23	-12.53	11.97	-0.09
Sydney-Membertou	35.45	18.00	45.05	-9.22	18.46	-9.82
Timberlea-Prospect	31.92	7.57	54.89	0.51	11.73	-5.55
Truro-Bible Hill-Millbrook-Salmon River	67.76	19.92	14.31	-15.89	17.92	1.30
Victoria-The Lakes	65.45	11.08	21.63	-12.57	9.06	-0.58
Waverley-Fall River-Beaver Bank	56.70	16.32	19.92	-16.44	19.19	2.98
Yarmouth	48.32	11.30	48.11	-8.21	2.74	-1.43

== Candidates by constituency ==
Legend
bold denotes party leader
† denotes an incumbent who is not running for re-election

=== Annapolis Valley ===
Electoral district	Candidates					Incumbent
Electoral district	PC	Liberal	NDP	Green	Independent	Incumbent
Annapolis	David Bowlby	Carman Kerr	Cheryl Burbidge	Sara Adams		Carman Kerr
Clare	Ryan Robicheau	Ronnie LeBlanc	Dre Taylor			Ronnie LeBlanc
Digby-Annapolis	Jill Balser	Joey Amero	Shannon Long			Jill Balser
Hants West	Melissa Sheehy-Richard	Brian Casey	Simon Greenough		James Omand	Melissa Sheehy-Richard
Kings North	John A. Lohr	Richelle Brown Redden	Gillian Yorke	Dave Lowe		John Lohr
Kings South	Julie Vanexan	Mike Hamm	Ramona Jennex	Sheila G. Richardson		Keith Irving†
Kings West	Chris Palmer	Brad Beardsley	Paul Doerr	Madeline Taylor		Chris Palmer

=== South Shore ===
Electoral district	Candidates				Incumbent
Electoral district	PC	Liberal	NDP	Green	Incumbent
Argyle	Colton LeBlanc	Lorelei Murphy	Lauren Skabar	Lynette Amirault	Colton LeBlanc
Chester-St. Margaret's	Danielle Barkhouse	Laura Mulrooney	Brendan Mosher		Danielle Barkhouse
Lunenburg	Susan Corkum-Greek	Melissa Duggan	Nick Jennery	Frank Fawson	Susan Corkum-Greek
Lunenburg West	Becky Druhan	Jonathan Crouse	Nicholas Piovesan	Mitchell Thomas-Langford	Becky Druhan
Queens	Kim Masland	Cathy DeRome	Brian Skabar		Kim Masland
Shelburne	Nolan Young	Debbie Muise	Bridget Taylor		Nolan Young
Yarmouth	Nick Hilton	**Zach Churchill**	Gillian Rowley	Adam Randall	Zach Churchill

=== Fundy-Northeast ===
Electoral district	Candidates					Incumbent
Electoral district	PC	Liberal	NDP	Green	Independent	Incumbent
Colchester-Musquodoboit Valley	Scott Armstrong	Gwynneth (Gwyn) Bellefontaine	Janet Moulton			Larry Harrison†
Colchester North	Tom Taggart	Dustin Rekunyk	Christina McCarron	Jillian Foster		Tom Taggart
Cumberland North	Bill Dowe	Kurt Ditner	Tyson Boyd		Elizabeth Smith-McCrossin	Elizabeth Smith-McCrossin
Cumberland South	Tory Rushton	Liam MacDonald	Larry Duchesne			Tory Rushton
Hants East	John A. MacDonald	Shannon MacWilliam	Abby Cameron			John A. MacDonald
Truro-Bible Hill-Millbrook-Salmon River	Dave Ritcey	Frank Johnston	Cailen Pygott			Dave Ritcey

=== Central Halifax ===
Electoral district	Candidates				Incumbent
Electoral district	PC	Liberal	NDP	Green	Incumbent
Clayton Park West	Adegoke Fadare	Elizabeth Eustaquio-Domondon	Wendy Hood-Morris		Rafah DiCostanzo†
Fairview-Clayton Park	Nicole Mosher	Patricia Arab	Lina Hamid		Patricia Arab
Halifax Armdale	Craig Myra	Ali Duale	Rod Wilson		Ali Duale
Halifax Chebucto	Tonya Malay	Gerard Bray	Krista Gallagher	Jonathan Bradet-Legris	Gary Burrill†
Halifax Citadel-Sable Island	Eleanor Humphries	Rob Grace	Lisa Lachance	Karen Beazley	Lisa Lachance
Halifax Needham	Trayvone Clayton	Jon Frost	Suzy Hansen	Amethyste Hamel-Gregory	Suzy Hansen

=== Suburban Halifax ===
Electoral district	Candidates				Incumbent
Electoral district	PC	Liberal	NDP	Green	Incumbent
Bedford Basin	Tim Outhit	Doris Robbins	Ryan Lutes		Kelly Regan†
Bedford South	Damian Stoilov	Braedon Clark	Isaac G. Wilson	Ron G. Parker	Braedon Clark
Halifax Atlantic	Brendan Maguire	Phil Chisholm	Cathy Cervin	Gadfly Stratton	Brendan Maguire
Hammonds Plains-Lucasville	Rick Burns	Ben Jessome	Terry J. Eyland	Roger Croll	Ben Jessome
Sackville-Cobequid	Paul Russell	Agatha Bourassa	Paul Wozney		Steve Craig†
Sackville-Uniacke	Brad Johns	Thomas Trappenberg	Lisa Blackburn		Brad Johns
Timberlea-Prospect	Trish MacDonald	Iain Rankin	Rose Gillam	Jane Matheson	Iain Rankin
Waverley-Fall River-Beaver Bank	Brian Wong	Elizabeth Booth	Donna McCarthy	**Anthony Edmonds**	Brian Wong

=== Dartmouth/Cole Harbour/Eastern Shore ===
Electoral district	Candidates					Incumbent
Electoral district	PC	Liberal	NDP	Green	Independent	Incumbent
Cole Harbour	Leah Martin	Tania Meloni	Alec Stratford	John E. McStay		Tony Ince†
Cole Harbour-Dartmouth	Brad McGowan	Vishal Bhardwaj	Kayley Dixon			Lorelei Nicoll†
Dartmouth East	Timothy Halman	Stacy Chesnutt	Holly Fraughton			Tim Halman
Dartmouth North	Karina Sanford	Pam Cooley	Susan Leblanc			Susan Leblanc
Dartmouth South	Bea MacGregor	Barb Henderson	**Claudia Chender**			Claudia Chender
Eastern Passage	Barbara Adams	Chris Peters			Tammy Jakeman (Note: Jakeman was the NDP candidate, but was removed by the party after the candidate deadline. She was subsequently listed as an independent candidate by Elections Nova Scotia.)	Barbara Adams
Eastern Shore	Kent Smith	Doyle Safire	Don Carney	Kevin Conrod		Kent Smith
Preston	Twila Grosse	Carlo Simmons	Colter (C.C.) Simmonds	Andre Anderson		Twila Grosse

=== Central Nova ===
Electoral district	Candidates				Incumbent
Electoral district	PC	Liberal	NDP	Green	Incumbent
Antigonish	Michelle Thompson	Sheila Sears	John MacIsaac		Michelle Thompson
Guysborough-Tracadie	Greg Morrow	George Grant	Deborah Martinello		Greg Morrow
Pictou Centre	Danny MacGillivray	Kris MacFarlane	Mary Stewart		Pat Dunn†
Pictou East	**Tim Houston**	Stephanie Quinn	Vernon Theriault		Tim Houston
Pictou West	Marco MacLeod	Mary Wooldridge-Elliott	Carol Ferguson	Clare Brett	Marco MacLeod

=== Cape Breton ===
Electoral district	Candidates					Incumbent
Electoral district	PC	Liberal	NDP	Green	Independent	Incumbent
Cape Breton Centre-Whitney Pier	Darren O'Quinn	Joleen Magliaro	Kendra Coombes			Kendra Coombes
Cape Breton East	Brian Comer	Joe Ward	Isabelle Lalonde			Brian Comer
Glace Bay-Dominion	John White	David Alexander MacLeod	Kathy Chapman			John White
Inverness	Kyle MacQuarrie	Jaime Beaton	Joanna Clark			Allan MacMaster†
Northside-Westmount	Fred Tilley	Danny Laffin	Katelyn Armstrong			Fred Tilley
Richmond	Trevor Boudreau	Rochelle Heudes	Marc Currie			Trevor Boudreau
Sydney-Membertou	Brian MacArthur	Derek Mombourquette	Alison Aho	Steven McGrath		Derek Mombourquette
Victoria-The Lakes	Dianne Timmins	Stephen MacAskill	Samuel Stirling	Adrianna MacKinnon	Stemer MacLeod	Keith Bain†

== Opinion polls ==
=== Voting intentions in Nova Scotia since the 2021 election ===

Opinion polls
Polling firm	Dates conducted	Link	PC	Liberal	NDP	Green	Others	Margin of error	Sample size	Polling method	Lead
2024 general election	26 Nov 2024		52.50	22.73	22.15	0.83	1.17	—N/a	357,048	—N/a	29.77
Forum Research	23–25 Nov 2024		47	23	27	2	1	±3.0%	1,472	IVR	20
Liaison Strategies	23–24 Nov 2024		51	20	25	2	2	±3.99%	602	IVR	26
Mainstreet Research	21–23 Nov 2024		54	18	25	—N/a	4	±3.6%	743	SMS to online	29
Abacus Data	21–23 Nov 2024		48	22	28	1	—N/a	±3.8%	645	Online	20
MQO Research	14–20 Nov 2024		51	22	24	2	1	±4.4%	392	Online	27
Narrative Research	4–17 Nov 2024		44	24	28	3	1	±4.3%	526	Telephone	16
Cardinal Research	7–15 Nov 2024		48	26	20	3	3	±3.5%	799	Telephone	22
Abacus Data	7–10 Nov 2024		47	25	23	4	—N/a	±4.1%	600	Online	22
MQO Research	3–10 Nov 2024		47	20	24	7	2	±5.0%	396	Online	23
Mainstreet Research	1–2 Nov 2024		50	22	25	—N/a	3	±3.9%	635	Smart IVR	25
Abacus Data	28–31 Oct 2024		45	25	26	4	—N/a	±4.1%	600	Online	19
Liaison Strategies	28–29 Oct 2024		38	26	29	5	2	±3.7%	701	IVR	9
Narrative Research	31 Jul – 14 Aug 2024		53	24	19	4	1	±4.9%	400	Telephone	29
Narrative Research	7–29 May 2024		50	23	22	3	2	±4.9%	400	Telephone	27
Narrative Research	6–17 Feb 2024		49	25	20	5	1	±4.9%	400	Telephone	24
Narrative Research	1–21 Nov 2023		52	21	22	3	1	±4.9%	400	Telephone	30
Narrative Research	1–14 Aug 2023		47	23	24	4	2	±4.9%	400	Telephone	23
Narrative Research	3–16 May 2023		39	31	24	5	1	±4.9%	400	Telephone	8
Narrative Research	8–23 Feb 2023		46	25	24	4	2	±4.6%	450	Telephone	21
Narrative Research	2–28 Nov 2022		42	27	25	5	1	±4.0%	605	Telephone	15
Narrative Research	4–23 Aug 2022		43	30	22	4	1	±4.0%	585	Telephone	13
Angus Reid	7–13 Jun 2022		46	21	27	3	2	±5.0%	330	Online	24
Narrative Research	3–22 May 2022		42	27	25	4	1	±5.0%	380	Telephone	15
Abacus Data	14–21 Apr 2022		39	31	23	—N/a	7	±4.4%	500	Online	8
Angus Reid	10–15 Mar 2022		47	25	22	2	5	±5.0%	366	Online	22
Narrative Research	8–23 Feb 2022		44	27	20	6	2	±4.9%	396	Telephone	17
Angus Reid	7–12 Jan 2022		38	28	26	1	6	±6.0%	320	Online	10
MQO Research	14–24 Nov 2021		41	23	27	5	3	±4.9%	400	Telephone	14
Narrative Research	4–21 Nov 2021		42	26	24	5	3	±4.2%	557	Telephone	16
Angus Reid	29 Sep – 3 Oct 2021		39	21	32	4	5	N/A	264	Online	7
2021 general election	17 Aug 2021		38.43	36.67	20.94	2.14	1.41	—N/a	422,754	—N/a	1.76
Polling firm	Dates conducted	Link					Others	Margin of error	Sample size	Polling method	Lead
Polling firm	Dates conducted	Link	PC	Liberal	NDP	Green	Others	Margin of error	Sample size	Polling method	Lead
