= Nova Scotia House of Assembly =

Legislative chamber of the General Assembly of Nova Scotia

Nova Scotia House of Assembly Assemblée législative de la Nouvelle-Écosse
- 65th General Assembly of Nova Scotia

Type
- Type: Lower house (1758–1928) then unicameral house of the General Assembly of Nova Scotia
- Sovereign: The lieutenant governor (representing the King of Canada)

History
- Founded: 1758; 268 years ago

Leadership
- Speaker: Danielle Barkhouse, PC since September 5, 2024
- Premier: Tim Houston, PC since August 31, 2021
- Leader of Opposition: Claudia Chender, NDP since December 10, 2024

Structure
- Seats: 56
- Political groups: Government: Progressive Conservative Association of Nova Scotia (43); Official Opposition: Nova Scotia New Democratic Party (9); Other Parties: Nova Scotia Liberal Party (3); Independent (1)

Elections
- Last election: November 26, 2024
- Next election: On or before December 7, 2029

Meeting place
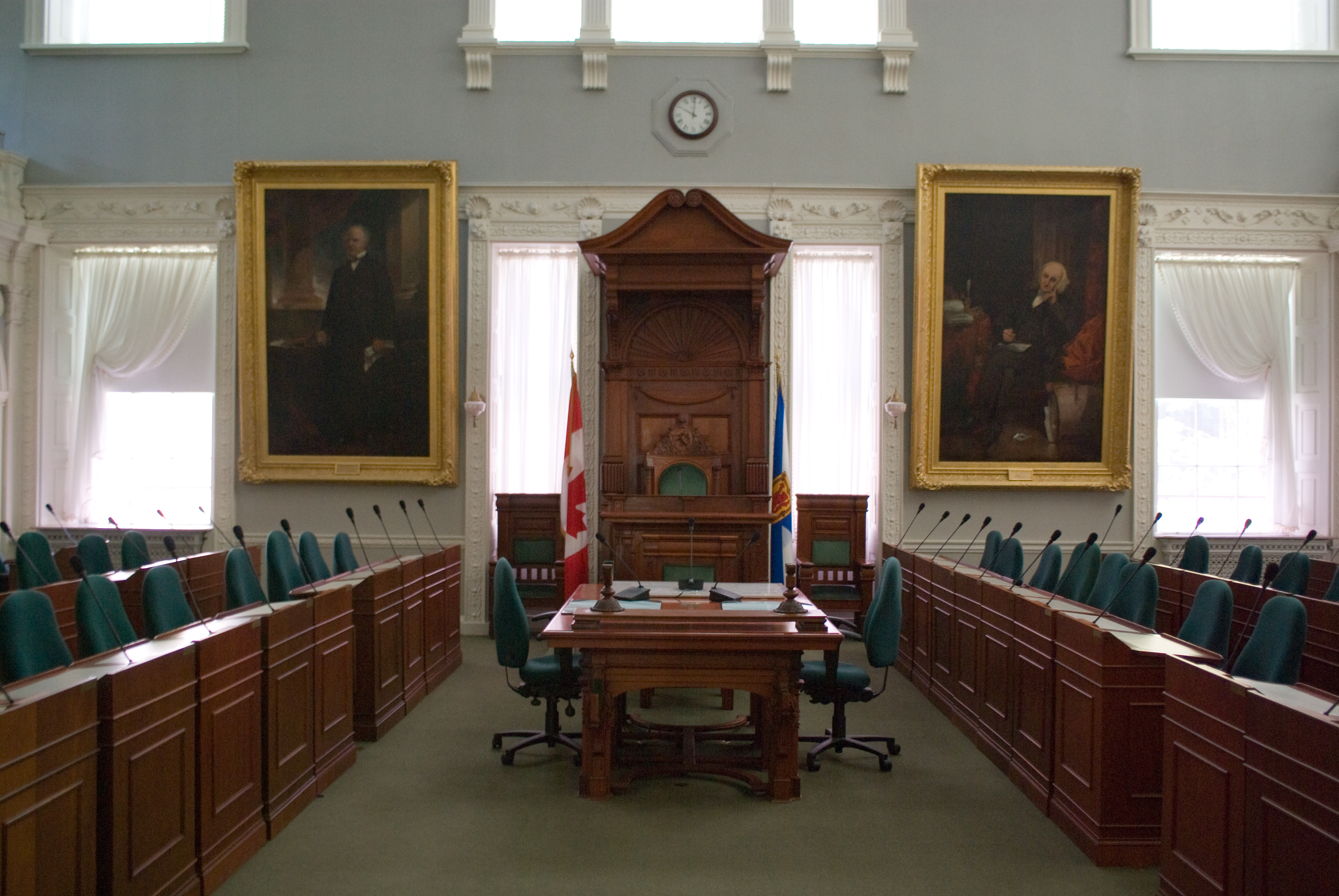
- Legislative Chamber, Province House, Halifax, Nova Scotia, Canada

Website
- nslegislature.ca/

The Nova Scotia House of Assembly (French: Assemblée législative de la Nouvelle-Écosse, or Legislative Assembly, is the deliberative assembly of the General Assembly of Nova Scotia, and together with the lieutenant governor of Nova Scotia makes up the Nova Scotia Legislature.

The assembly is the oldest in Canada, having first sat in 1758; in 1848, it was the site of the first responsible government in the British Empire. Bills passed by the House of Assembly are given royal assent by the lieutenant governor in the name of the King of Canada.

Originally (in 1758), the Legislature consisted of the Crown represented by a governor (later a lieutenant governor), the appointed Nova Scotia Council holding both executive and legislative duties and an elected House of Assembly (lower chamber). In 1838, the council was replaced by an executive council with the executive function and a legislative council with the legislative functions based on the House of Lords. In 1928, the Legislative Council was abolished and the members pensioned off.

There are 56 Members of the Legislative Assembly (MLAs) representing 56 electoral districts. Members nearly always represent one of the three main political parties of the province: the Nova Scotia Liberal Party, Progressive Conservative Party of Nova Scotia, and Nova Scotia New Democratic Party.

The assembly meets in Province House. Located in Halifax, Province House is a National Historic Site and Canada's oldest and smallest legislative building. It opened on February 11, 1819. The building was also originally home to the Supreme Court of Nova Scotia, and the location of the "Freedom of the Press" trial of Joseph Howe. Its main entrance is found on Hollis Street in Halifax.

== Officers ==
A number of officers of the house are appointed in accordance with legislation passed by the house. These officers fulfil numerous functions as prescribed in the relevant legislation. There are two categories of officers:

=== Officers under the authority of the speaker ===
The Speaker of the House has authority over the following offices and officers:

- Clerk
- Hansard
- House Operations
- Legislative Committees
- Legislative Counsel
- Legislative Library
- Legislative Television Broadcasting Services
- Sergeant-at-Arms
- Speaker's Administration Office

=== Independent officers ===
These include the Auditor General, the Office of the Ombudsman and the Office of the Conflict of Interest Commissioner.

The Chief Electoral Officer of Nova Scotia as head of Elections Nova Scotia is also appointed by a majority vote of the house and is considered an officer of the house.

== Party standings ==
Affiliation	Members
Progressive Conservative	43
New Democratic	9
Liberal	3
Independent	1
Vacant	0
Total	56
Government majority	+29

=== Current members ===
Riding	Member	Party	First elected / previously elected	Notes
Annapolis	David Bowlby	Progressive Conservative	2024	
Antigonish	Michelle Thompson	Progressive Conservative	2021	
Argyle	Colton LeBlanc	Progressive Conservative	2019	
Bedford Basin	Tim Outhit	Progressive Conservative	2024	
Bedford South	Damian Stoilov	Progressive Conservative	2024	
Cape Breton Centre-Whitney Pier	Kendra Coombes	NDP	2020	
Cape Breton East	Brian Comer	Progressive Conservative	2019	
Chester-St. Margaret's	Danielle Barkhouse	Progressive Conservative	2021	
Chéticamp-Margarees-Pleasant Bay	Claude Bourgeois	Progressive Conservative	2026	
Clare	Ryan Robicheau	Progressive Conservative	2024	
Clayton Park West	Adegoke Fadare	Progressive Conservative	2024	
Colchester-Musquodoboit Valley	Scott Armstrong	Progressive Conservative	2024	
Colchester North	Tom Taggart	Progressive Conservative	2021	
Cole Harbour-Dartmouth	Brad McGowan	Progressive Conservative	2024	
Cole Harbour	Leah Martin	Progressive Conservative	2024	
Cumberland North	Elizabeth Smith-McCrossin	Independent	2017 (Note: First elected as a Progressive Conservative)	
Cumberland South	Tory Rushton	Progressive Conservative	2018	
Dartmouth East	Tim Halman	Progressive Conservative	2017	
Dartmouth North	Susan Leblanc	NDP	2017	
Dartmouth South	Claudia Chender	NDP	2017	Leader of the Opposition
Digby-Annapolis	Jill Balser	Progressive Conservative	2021	
Eastern Passage	Barbara Adams	Progressive Conservative	2017	
Eastern Shore	Kent Smith	Progressive Conservative	2021	
Fairview-Clayton Park	Lina Hamid	NDP	2024	
Glace Bay-Dominion	John White	Progressive Conservative	2021	
Guysborough-Tracadie	Greg Morrow	Progressive Conservative	2021	
Halifax Armdale	Rod Wilson	NDP	2024	
Halifax Atlantic	Brendan Maguire	Progressive Conservative	2013 (Note: First elected as a Liberal)	
Halifax Chebucto	Krista Gallagher	NDP	2024	
Halifax Citadel-Sable Island	Lisa Lachance	NDP	2021	
Halifax Needham	Suzy Hansen	NDP	2021	
Hammonds Plains-Lucasville	Rick Burns	Progressive Conservative	2024	
Hants East	John A. MacDonald	Progressive Conservative	2021	
Hants West	Melissa Sheehy-Richard	Progressive Conservative	2021	
Inverness	Kyle MacQuarrie	Progressive Conservative	2024	
Kings North	John Lohr	Progressive Conservative	2013	
Kings South	Julie Vanexan	Progressive Conservative	2024	
Kings West	Chris Palmer	Progressive Conservative	2021	
Lunenburg	Susan Corkum-Greek	Progressive Conservative	2021	
Lunenburg West	Becky Druhan	Liberal	2021	Leader of the Liberal Party
Northside-Westmount	Fred Tilley	Progressive Conservative	2021	
Pictou Centre	Danny MacGillivray	Progressive Conservative	2024	
Pictou East	Tim Houston	Progressive Conservative	2013	Premier of Nova Scotia
Pictou West	Marco MacLeod	Progressive Conservative	2024	
Preston	Twila Grosse	Progressive Conservative	2023	
Queens	Kim Masland	Progressive Conservative	2017	
Richmond	Trevor Boudreau	Progressive Conservative	2021	
Sackville-Cobequid	Paul Wozney	NDP	2024	
Sackville-Uniacke	Brad Johns	Progressive Conservative	2017	
Shelburne	Nolan Young	Progressive Conservative	2021	
Sydney-Membertou	Derek Mombourquette	Liberal	2015	
Timberlea-Prospect	Iain Rankin	Liberal	2013	
Truro-Bible Hill-Millbrook-Salmon River	Dave Ritcey	Progressive Conservative	2020	
Victoria-The Lakes	Dianne Timmins	Progressive Conservative	2024	
Waverley-Fall River-Beaverbank	Brian Wong	Progressive Conservative	2021	
Yarmouth	Nick Hilton	Progressive Conservative	2024	

== Committees ==
=== Standing Committees ===
- Assembly Matters
- Community Services
- Natural Resources and Economic Development
- Health
- Human Resources
- Internal Affairs
- Law Amendments
- Private & Local Bills
- Public Accounts
- Veterans Affairs

=== Committees of the Whole House ===
- Bills
- Supply
  - Supply Subcommittee

=== Recent Former Select Committees ===
(final reports filed)

- Electoral Boundaries
- Fire Safety
- National Unity
- Petroleum Product Pricing
- Workers' Compensation Act

=== Special Committee ===
- to Review the Estimates of the Auditor General and the Chief Electoral Officer

== Seating plan ==
Smith-McCrossin		Stoilov	MacGillivray	Bourgeois	Gallagher	Wilson	Hamid
	Wong	Morrow	Rushton	Smith	Coombes	Hansen	Wozney	Druhan
White	Halman	Armstrong	Balser	C. LeBlanc	CHENDER	Lachance	S. Leblanc	RANKIN	Mombourquette
Barkhouse
Comer	Young	Masland	Lohr	Maguire	HOUSTON	Adams	Thompson	Tilley	Ritcey	Grosse
Boudreau	Robicheau	MacDonald	Sheehy-Richard	Palmer	Martin	Corkum-Greek	Fadare	MacLeod	Taggart	Johns
McGowan	MacQuarrie	Outhit	Burns	Vanexan		Timmins	Bowlby	Hilton

Current as of September 2026

== See also ==
- List of Nova Scotia General Assemblies
- List of political parties in Nova Scotia
- Executive Council of Nova Scotia (Cabinet)
- Province House (Nova Scotia)
- Politics of Nova Scotia
