= Progressive Conservative Association of Nova Scotia =

Provincial political party in Canada

- Leader: Tim Houston
- President: David Bond
- Founded: 1867
- Headquarters: 1660 Hollis Street; Suite 1003; Halifax, Nova Scotia; B3J 1V7
- Youth wing: Nova Scotia Young Progressive Conservatives
- Membership (2018): 11,579
- Ideology: Red Toryism; Progressive conservatism
- Political position: Centre to centre-right
- Colours: Blue
- Seats in House of Assembly: 43 / 56

Website
- pcpartyns.ca

The Progressive Conservative Association of Nova Scotia, more commonly known as the Progressive Conservative Party of Nova Scotia, is a political party in Nova Scotia, Canada. Like most conservative parties in Atlantic Canada, it has been historically associated with the Red Tory faction of Canadian conservatism. The party is currently led by Pictou East MLA Tim Houston. The party won a majority government in the 2021 provincial election. He called a snap election in 2024, increasing his party's majority mandate. The Progressive Conservative Party of Nova Scotia and the Conservative Party of Canada are two separate entities.

== History ==
The Progressive Conservative Association of Nova Scotia, registered under the Nova Scotia Elections Act as the Progressive Conservative Party of Nova Scotia, originated from the Confederation Party of Charles Tupper. Tupper united members of the pre-Confederation Conservative Party (who were predominantly United Empire Loyalists and members of the business elite) and supporters of Sir John A. Macdonald's national Conservative coalition. The party supported Macdonald's protectionist National Policy, nation-building, and the unification of British North America.

Canadian Confederation was initially unpopular in Nova Scotia, and the party was out of government for most of the late 19th century. It formed government for only six years between 1867 and 1956. It bottomed out in 1945, when the party was shut out of the legislature altogether.

The modern party was built by Robert Stanfield after World War II. Stanfield, the scion of a wealthy textile family, had considered himself socialist in university; though he later moderated his views, he always remained a progressive. Under his leadership, what was by then the "Progressive Conservative Party" became a moderate Red Tory organization. He was able to get the party back into the House of Assembly soon after taking the leadership. By 1956, he had built it into an organization that was able to sweep to power, winning re-election four times.

As premier, he led reforms in human rights, education, municipal government and health care and also created Industrial Estates Limited, a crown corporation that successfully attracted investment from world companies such as Michelin Tire. He worked to modernized the road system, brought in the first form of Medicare, established the first economic development agency, invested heavily in education at all levels and established the predecessor to the Nova Scotia Community College.

After Stanfield left provincial politics to become leader of the federal Progressive Conservative Party in 1967, G. I. Smith served as premier until 1970. After being elected party leader in 1971, John Buchanan was elected premier in 1978. He was re-elected in 1981, 1984 and 1988. In the 1984 election, voters served his largest majority, capturing 42 of the 52 seats in the legislature. Buchanan's government first succeeded in convincing federal government to give Nova Scotia control over offshore resources such as gas and oil, resulting in future revenue for the province through the Crown Share.

Roger Bacon became premier in 1990 after Buchanan was appointed to the Senate of Canada and until the party selected Donald W. Cameron as party leader and premier. During his term, Cameron reformed government finance practices, promoted anti-discrimination measures, introduced new government accountability measures and established the first non-partisan electoral boundaries revision commission in 1992.

=== Recent history ===
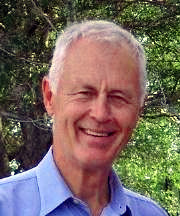
John Hamm

After six years of Liberal governments led by John Savage and later Russel MacLellan, PC leader John Hamm was elected premier in 1999. After taking office, he invested more in education and health care, implemented some tax cuts and sold or closed government-owned industries such as Sydney Steel. His government also passed tough lobbyist registration legislation, introduced smoking cessation initiatives, provided new funding for community college modernization and achieved historically high economic growth and employment numbers. His government was the first to balance provincial finances in 25 years in 2002. Hamm retired as Premier of Nova Scotia and leader of the PC party in 2006.

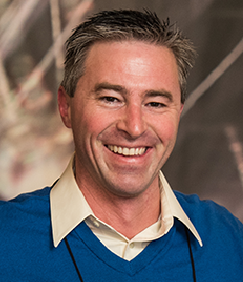
Tim Houston is the current Premier, and leader of the Progressive Conservative Party of Nova Scotia.

Rodney MacDonald was elected to replace Hamm as party leader in 2006 and subsequently became Premier of Nova Scotia. Through strategic investments in rural broadband infrastructure, MacDonald continued to expand high-speed internet access throughout the province. MacDonald's government moved to help stabilize energy costs, grow the economy and attract new investment to the province.

The 2006 election resulted in a reduced minority for MacDonald and the Progressive Conservatives were reduced to third-party status in the 2009 election. On June 24, 2009, MacDonald stepped down as leader and Karen Casey was named the interim leader.

Jamie Baillie became leader of the PC Party on October 30, 2010 after running unopposed. He led the party into the 2013 election, and won eleven seats allowing the PC party form the Official Opposition. In the 2017 election, the party retained official opposition status, and increased their seat count to 17.

On November 1, 2017, Baillie announced he was stepping down as leader. Baillie was to remain in the position until a new leader was chosen, however on January 24, 2018, he resigned after the party executive requested his immediate resignation due to "allegations of inappropriate behaviour". Following his resignation, Pictou West MLA Karla MacFarlane was named interim leader.

In 2018, Tim Houston was elected the leader of the PC party after getting a large plurality of the points in the first round.

In the 2021 Nova Scotia general election, Tim Houston fought the campaign on a pledge to spend more to fix healthcare. The Progressive Conservative party won a majority government for the first time since 1999 and formed government for the first time since 2006.

According to the PC Party website, their mission is "to form a fiscally responsible, socially progressive government that promotes individual achievement and personal responsibility, is accountable to its citizens, listens to its people, embraces innovation, preserves the best of our unique heritage and diverse cultures and learns from the past".

== Current elected members ==
| Name | Riding | Year elected |
|---|---|---|
| Tim Houston | Pictou East | 2013 |
| Barbara Adams | Eastern Passage | 2017 |
| Scott Armstrong | Colchester-Musquodoboit Valley | 2024 |
| Jill Balser | Digby-Annapolis | 2021 |
| Danielle Barkhouse | Chester-St. Margaret's | 2021 |
| Trevor Boudreau | Richmond | 2021 |
| Claude Bourgeois | Chéticamp-Margarees-Pleasant Bay | 2026 |
| David Bowlby | Annapolis | 2024 |
| Rick Burns | Hammonds Plains-Lucasville | 2024 |
| Brian Comer | Cape Breton East | 2019 |
| Susan Corkum-Greek | Lunenburg | 2021 |
| Adegoke Fadare | Clayton Park West | 2024 |
| Twila Grosse | Preston | 2023 |
| Tim Halman | Dartmouth East | 2017 |
| Nick Hilton | Yarmouth | 2024 |
| Brad Johns | Sackville-Uniacke | 2017 |
| Colton LeBlanc | Argyle | 2019 |
| John Lohr | Kings North | 2013 |
| John A. MacDonald | Hants East | 2021 |
| Danny MacGillivray | Pictou Centre | 2024 |
| Marco MacLeod | Pictou West | 2024 |
| Kyle MacQuarrie | Inverness | 2024 |
| Brendan Maguire | Halifax Atlantic | 2013 |
| Leah Martin | Cole Harbour | 2024 |
| Kim Masland | Queens | 2017 |
| Brad McGowan | Cole Harbour-Dartmouth | 2024 |
| Greg Morrow | Guysborough-Tracadie | 2021 |
| Tim Outhit | Bedford Basin | 2024 |
| Chris Palmer | Kings West | 2021 |
| Dave Ritcey | Truro-Bible Hill-Millbrook-Salmon River | 2020 |
| Ryan Robicheau | Clare | 2024 |
| Tory Rushton | Cumberland South | 2018 |
| Melissa Sheehy-Richard | Hants West | 2021 |
| Damian Stoilov | Bedford South | 2024 |
| Kent Smith | Eastern Shore | 2021 |
| Tom Taggart | Colchester North | 2021 |
| Michelle Thompson | Antigonish | 2021 |
| Fred Tilley | Northside-Westmount | 2021 |
| Dianne Timmins | Victoria-The Lakes | 2024 |
| Julie Vanexan | Kings South | 2024 |
| John White | Glace Bay-Dominion | 2021 |
| Brian Wong | Waverley-Fall River-Beaver Bank | 2021 |
| Nolan Young | Shelburne | 2021 |

== Party leaders ==
- **James William Johnston** (1843–1864)
- **Charles Tupper** (1864–1867)
- **Hiram Blanchard** (1867–1874)
- **Simon Hugh Holmes** (1874–1882)
- **John Sparrow David Thompson** (1882)
- Adam Carr Bell (1882–1887)
- William McKay (1887–1890)
- Charles Cahan (1890–1894)
- William McKay (1894–1897)
- John Fitzwilliam Stairs (1897–1904)
- Charles Wilcox (1898–1901) (house leader)
- Charles E. Tanner (1901–1908) (house leader)
- Charles Wilcox (1908–1909) (house leader)
- John M. Baillie (1909–1912) (house leader)
- Charles E. Tanner (1912–1922)
- W.L. Hall (1922–1925)
- **Edgar Nelson Rhodes** (1925–1930)
- **Gordon Sidney Harrington** (1930–1937)
- Percy C. Black (1937–1940)
- Leonard William Fraser (1940–1948)
- Fred M. Blois (1940–1945) (house leader)
- **Robert Stanfield** (1948–1967)
- **G.I. Smith** (1967–1971)
- **John Buchanan** (1971–1990)
- **Roger Stuart Bacon** (1990–1991) (interim)
- **Donald W. Cameron** (1991–1993)
- Terry Donahoe (1993–1995) (interim)
- **John Hamm** (1995–2006)
- **Rodney MacDonald** (2006–2009)
- Karen Casey (2009–2010) (interim)
- Jamie Baillie (2010–2018)
- Karla MacFarlane (2018) (interim)
- **Tim Houston** (2018–present)

Bold indicates Party leaders who served as Premier of the colony or province of Nova Scotia.

== Electoral performance ==
| Election | Leader | Votes | % | Seats | +/– | Position | Status |
|---|---|---|---|---|---|---|---|
| 1867 | Hiram Blanchard | | 38.5 | 2 / 38 (5%) | 0 | 2nd | Opposition |
| 1871 | Hiram Blanchard | | 43.7 | 14 / 38 (37%) | ▲12 | 2nd | Opposition |
| 1874 | Simon Hugh Holmes | | 43.6 | 12 / 38 (32%) | ▼2 | 2nd | Opposition |
| 1878 | Simon Hugh Holmes | | 51.7 | 32 / 38 (84%) | ▲20 | ▲1st | Majority |
| 1882 | John Sparrow David Thompson | | 46.9 | 14 / 38 (37%) | ▼18 | ▼2nd | Opposition |
| 1886 | Adam Carr Bell | | 28.6 | 10 / 38 (26%) | ▼4 | 2nd | Opposition |
| 1890 | William MacKay | | 46.7 | 9 / 38 (24%) | ▼1 | 2nd | Opposition |
| 1894 | William MacKay | | 47.3 | 13 / 38 (34%) | ▲4 | 2nd | Opposition |
| 1897 | William MacKay | | 44.4 | 3 / 38 (8%) | ▼10 | 2nd | Opposition |
| 1901 | Charles Smith Wilcox | | 41.7 | 2 / 38 (5%) | ▼1 | 2nd | Opposition |
| 1906 | Charles Elliott Tanner | | 42.1 | 4 / 38 (11%) | ▲2 | 2nd | Opposition |
| 1911 | John M. Baillie | | 45.4 | 12 / 38 (32%) | ▲8 | 2nd | Opposition |
| 1916 | Charles Elliott Tanner | | 48.8 | 12 / 43 (28%) | 0 | 2nd | Opposition |
| 1920 | William Lorimer Hall | | 24.7 | 3 / 43 (7%) | ▼9 | ▼4th | Opposition |
| 1925 | Edgar Nelson Rhodes | | 60.9 | 40 / 43 (93%) | ▲37 | ▲1st | Majority |
| 1928 | Edgar Nelson Rhodes | | 51.7 | 24 / 43 (56%) | ▼16 | 1st | Majority |
| 1933 | Gordon Sidney Harrington | | 45.9 | 8 / 30 (27%) | ▼16 | ▼2nd | Opposition |
| 1937 | Gordon Sidney Harrington | | 46.0 | 5 / 30 (17%) | ▼3 | 2nd | Opposition |
| 1941 | Frederick Murray Blois | | 40.3 | 5 / 30 (17%) | 0 | 2nd | Opposition |
| 1945 | Frederick Murray Blois | | 33.5 | 0 / 30 (0%) | ▼5 | ▼3rd | No seats |
| 1949 | Robert Stanfield | | 39.2 | 8 / 37 (22%) | ▲8 | ▲2nd | Opposition |
| 1953 | Robert Stanfield | | 43.6 | 13 / 37 (35%) | ▲5 | 2nd | Opposition |
| 1956 | Robert Stanfield | 162,678 | 48.6 | 24 / 43 (56%) | ▲11 | ▲1st | Majority |
| 1960 | Robert Stanfield | 168,023 | 48.3 | 27 / 43 (63%) | ▲3 | 1st | Majority |
| 1963 | Robert Stanfield | 191,128 | 56.2 | 39 / 43 (91%) | ▲12 | 1st | Majority |
| 1967 | Robert Stanfield | 180,498 | 52.8 | 40 / 46 (87%) | ▲1 | 1st | Majority |
| 1970 | George Isaac Smith | 177,986 | 46.9 | 21 / 46 (46%) | ▼19 | ▼2nd | Opposition |
| 1974 | John Buchanan | 166,388 | 38.6 | 12 / 46 (26%) | ▼9 | 2nd | Opposition |
| 1978 | John Buchanan | 203,500 | 45.8 | 31 / 52 (60%) | ▲19 | ▲1st | Majority |
| 1981 | John Buchanan | 200,228 | 45.8 | 37 / 52 (71%) | ▲6 | 1st | Majority |
| 1984 | John Buchanan | 209,298 | 50.6 | 42 / 52 (81%) | ▲5 | 1st | Majority |
| 1988 | John Buchanan | 204,150 | 43.4 | 28 / 52 (54%) | ▼14 | 1st | Majority |
| 1993 | Donald William Cameron | 151,383 | 31.1 | 9 / 52 (17%) | ▼19 | ▼2nd | Opposition |
| 1998 | John Hamm | 133,540 | 29.75 | 14 / 52 (27%) | ▲5 | ▼3rd | Confidence and supply |
| 1999 | John Hamm | 169,383 | 39.20 | 30 / 52 (58%) | ▲16 | ▲1st | Majority |
| 2003 | John Hamm | 148,182 | 36.32 | 25 / 52 (48%) | ▼5 | 1st | Minority |
| 2006 | Rodney MacDonald | 160,119 | 39.57 | 23 / 52 (44%) | ▼2 | 1st | Minority |
| 2009 | Rodney MacDonald | 101,203 | 24.54 | 10 / 52 (19%) | ▼13 | ▼3rd | Third party |
| 2013 | Jamie Baillie | 109,452 | 26.31 | 11 / 51 (22%) | ▲1 | ▲2nd | Opposition |
| 2017 | Jamie Baillie | 142,672 | 35.73 | 17 / 51 (33%) | ▲6 | 2nd | Opposition |
| 2021 | Tim Houston | 162,473 | 38.44 | 31 / 55 (56%) | ▲14 | ▲1st | Majority |
| 2024 | Tim Houston | 187,430 | 52.83 | 43 / 55 (78%) | ▲12 | 1st | Majority |

== See also ==
- List of premiers of Nova Scotia
- List of political parties in Canada
- Progressive Conservative Association of Nova Scotia leadership elections
