= Elections Nova Scotia =

Canadian non-partisan government agency

Agency overview
- Formed: 1991
- Jurisdiction: Elections and plebiscites in Nova Scotia
- Headquarters: 202 Brownlow Avenue, Suite 505 Dartmouth, Nova Scotia
- Employees: 11
- Agency executive: Richard P. Temporale, Chief Electoral Officer
- Website: Official website

Elections Nova Scotia is the non-partisan agency of the House of Assembly of Nova Scotia charged with running provincial elections and administering provincial referendums in Nova Scotia, Canada. The Elections Act 2011 established Elections Nova Scotia as an independent, professional elections organization whose budget is approved directly by the legislature, and the act specifies that "the Office of the Chief Electoral Officer is to be known as Elections Nova Scotia".
