= 64th General Assembly of Nova Scotia =

2021–2024 House of Assembly session

- Majority parliament
- Sep. 24, 2021 – Oct. 27, 2024

Parliament leaders
- Premier: Tim Houston; August 31, 2021
- Leader of the Opposition: Iain Rankin; August 31, 2021 – July 9, 2022
- Zach Churchill; July 9, 2022 – October 27, 2024

Party caucuses
- Government: Progressive Conservative Party
- Opposition: Liberal Party
- Recognized: New Democratic Party

House of Assembly
- Speaker of the House: Keith Bain; September 24, 2021 – October 12, 2023
- Karla MacFarlane; October 12, 2023 – April 5, 2024
- Danielle Barkhouse; September 5, 2024
- Government House leader: Kim Masland; September 24, 2021
- Opposition House leader: Derek Mombourquette; September 24, 2021 – October 27, 2024
- Members: 55 MLA seats

Sovereign
- Monarch: Elizabeth II; 6 February 1952 – 8 September 2022
- Charles III; 8 September 2022
- Lieutenant governor: Arthur LeBlanc; June 28, 2017 – December 13, 2024

Sessions
- 1st session September 24, 2021 – October 27, 2024
← 63rd	→ 65th

64th General Assembly of Nova Scotia was the assembly of the Nova Scotia House of Assembly that was determined in the 2021 Nova Scotia election. The assembly opened on September 24, 2021. It was dissolved on October 27, 2024 when Premier Tim Houston visited the lieutenant-governor to call a snap election for November 26, 2024.

== List of members ==
Riding	Member	Party	First elected / previously elected	Notes
Annapolis	Carman Kerr	Liberal	2021	
Antigonish	Michelle Thompson	Progressive Conservative	2021	
Argyle	Colton LeBlanc	Progressive Conservative	2019	
Bedford Basin	Kelly Regan	Liberal	2009	
Bedford South	Braedon Clark	Liberal	2021	
Cape Breton Centre-Whitney Pier	Kendra Coombes	NDP	2020	
Cape Breton East	Brian Comer	Progressive Conservative	2019	
Chester-St. Margaret's	Danielle Barkhouse	Progressive Conservative	2021	
Clare	Ronnie LeBlanc	Liberal	2021	
Clayton Park West	Rafah DiCostanzo	Liberal	2017	
Colchester-Musquodoboit Valley	Larry Harrison	Progressive Conservative	2013	
Colchester North	Tom Taggart	Progressive Conservative	2021	
Cole Harbour-Dartmouth	Lorelei Nicoll	Liberal	2021	
Cole Harbour	Tony Ince	Liberal	2013	
Cumberland North	Elizabeth Smith-McCrossin	Independent	2017 (Note: First elected as a Progressive Conservative)	
Cumberland South	Tory Rushton	Progressive Conservative	2018	
Dartmouth East	Tim Halman	Progressive Conservative	2017	
Dartmouth North	Susan Leblanc	NDP	2017	
Dartmouth South	Claudia Chender	NDP	2017	Leader of the New Democratic Party
Digby-Annapolis	Jill Balser	Progressive Conservative	2021	
Eastern Passage	Barbara Adams	Progressive Conservative	2017	
Eastern Shore	Kent Smith	Progressive Conservative	2021	
Fairview-Clayton Park	Patricia Arab	Liberal	2013	
Glace Bay-Dominion	John White	Progressive Conservative	2021	
Guysborough-Tracadie	Greg Morrow	Progressive Conservative	2021	
Halifax Armdale	Ali Duale	Liberal	2021	
Halifax Atlantic	Brendan Maguire	Liberal	2013	Liberal until February 22, 2024; joined Progressive Conservative caucus.
Halifax Atlantic	Brendan Maguire	Progressive Conservative	2013	Liberal until February 22, 2024; joined Progressive Conservative caucus.
Halifax Chebucto	Gary Burrill	NDP	2009, (Note: Colchester-Musquodoboit Valley) 2017	
Halifax Citadel-Sable Island	Lisa Lachance	NDP	2021	
Halifax Needham	Suzy Hansen	NDP	2021	
Hammonds Plains-Lucasville	Ben Jessome	Liberal	2013	
Hants East	John A. MacDonald	Progressive Conservative	2021	
Hants West	Melissa Sheehy-Richard	Progressive Conservative	2021	
Inverness	Allan MacMaster	Progressive Conservative	2009	
Kings North	John Lohr	Progressive Conservative	2013	
Kings South	Keith Irving	Liberal	2013	
Kings West	Chris Palmer	Progressive Conservative	2021	
Lunenburg	Susan Corkum-Greek	Progressive Conservative	2021	
Lunenburg West	Becky Druhan	Progressive Conservative	2021	
Northside-Westmount	Fred Tilley	Liberal	2021	Liberal until October 22, 2024; joined Progressive Conservative caucus.
Northside-Westmount	Fred Tilley	Progressive Conservative	2021	Liberal until October 22, 2024; joined Progressive Conservative caucus.
Pictou Centre	Pat Dunn	Progressive Conservative	2006, 2013	
Pictou East	Tim Houston	Progressive Conservative	2013	Premier of Nova Scotia
Pictou West	Karla MacFarlane	Progressive Conservative	2013	Resigned April 12, 2024
Pictou West	Marco MacLeod	Progressive Conservative	2024	Elected May 21, 2024
Preston	Angela Simmonds	Liberal	2021	Resigned April 1, 2023
Preston	Twila Grosse	Progressive Conservative	2023	Elected August 8, 2023
Queens	Kim Masland	Progressive Conservative	2017	
Richmond	Trevor Boudreau	Progressive Conservative	2021	
Sackville-Cobequid	Steve Craig	Progressive Conservative	2019	
Sackville-Uniacke	Brad Johns	Progressive Conservative	2017	
Shelburne	Nolan Young	Progressive Conservative	2021	
Sydney-Membertou	Derek Mombourquette	Liberal	2015	
Timberlea-Prospect	Iain Rankin	Liberal	2013	
Truro-Bible Hill-Millbrook-Salmon River	Dave Ritcey	Progressive Conservative	2020	
Victoria-The Lakes	Keith Bain	Progressive Conservative	2006, 2017	
Waverley-Fall River-Beaverbank	Brian Wong	Progressive Conservative	2021	
Yarmouth	Zach Churchill	Liberal	2010	Leader of the Opposition

== Seating plan ==
Kerr	Irving	Regan	Smith-McCrossin
R. LeBlanc	Tilley	Clark	Nicoll	Duale	Lachance	Burrill	Hansen
DiConstanzo	Jessome	Ince	Mombourquette	CHURCHILL	Arab	Rankin	CHENDER	S. Leblanc	Coombes
Barkhouse
Halman	Rushton	Adams	Masland	HOUSTON	MacMaster	Grosse	Thompson	Lohr	C. LeBlanc	Comer	Smith
Young	White	Druhan	Morrow	Boudreau	Balser	Maguire	Sheehy-Richard	Corkum-Greek	Wong	Ritcey
MacDonald	Dunn	Bain	Palmer	Johns	MacLeod	Taggart	Harrison	Craig

Current as of September 2024

== Membership changes in the 64th Assembly ==
Number of members per party by date	2021	2023		2024			
Number of members per party by date	August 18	April 1	August 8	February 22	April 12	May 21	October 22
Progressive Conservative	31		32	33	32	33	34
Liberal	17	16		15			14
NDP	6						
Independent	1						
Vacant	0	1	0		1	0	

Membership changes in the 64th General Assembly
Date	Name	District	Party	Reason
August 17, 2021	See list of members			Election day of the 41st Nova Scotia general election
April 1, 2023	Angela Simmonds	Preston	Liberal	Resignation
August 8, 2023	Twila Grosse	Preston	Progressive Conservative	Elected in by-election
February 22, 2024	Brendan Maguire	Halifax Atlantic	Progressive Conservative	Joined Progressive Conservative caucus
April 12, 2024	Karla MacFarlane	Pictou West	Progressive Conservative	Resignation
May 21, 2024	Marco MacLeod	Pictou West	Progressive Conservative	Elected in by-election
October 22, 2024	Fred Tilley	Northside-Westmount	Progressive Conservative	Joined Progressive Conservative caucus

== See also ==
- Results of the 2021 Nova Scotia general election

== Notes ==
Preceded by 63rd General Assembly of Nova Scotia	General Assemblies of Nova Scotia; 2021–2024	Succeeded by 65th General Assembly of Nova Scotia
