= 63rd General Assembly of Nova Scotia =

2017–2021 House of Assembly session

- Majority parliament
- Jun. 16, 2017 – Jul. 17, 2021

Parliament leaders
- Premier: Stephen McNeil; October 22, 2013 – February 23, 2021
- Iain Rankin; February 23, 2021 – July 17, 2021
- Leader of the Opposition: Jamie Baillie; October 22, 2013 – January 24, 2018
- Karla MacFarlane; January 24, 2018 — October 27, 2018
- Tim Houston; October 27, 2018 – July 17, 2021

Party caucuses
- Government: Liberal Party
- Opposition: Progressive Conservative Party
- Recognized: New Democratic Party

House of Assembly
- Speaker of the House: Kevin Murphy; October 24, 2013 – July 17, 2021
- Government House leader: Geoff MacLellan; June 16, 2017 – July 17, 2021
- Opposition House leader: Chris d'Entremont; October 24, 2013 – February 28, 2019
- Allan MacMaster; February 28, 2019 – July 17, 2021
- Members: 51 MLA seats

Sovereign
- Monarch: Elizabeth II; February 6, 1952–September 8, 2022
- Lieutenant governor: Arthur LeBlanc; June 28, 2017–December 13, 2024

Sessions
- 1st session June 16, 2017 – September 6, 2018
- 2nd session September 6, 2018 – December 18, 2020
- 3rd session March 9, 2021 – July 17, 2021
← 62nd	→ 64th

63rd General Assembly of Nova Scotia was the assembly of the Nova Scotia House of Assembly that was determined in the 2017 Nova Scotia election. The assembly opened on June 16, 2017, and was dissolved July 17, 2021.

== List of members ==
Riding	Member	Party	First elected / previously elected	Notes
Annapolis	Stephen McNeil	Liberal	2003	Resigned May 3, 2021
Annapolis	Vacant		2003	
Antigonish	Randy Delorey	Liberal	2013	
Argyle-Barrington	Chris d'Entremont	Progressive Conservative	2003	Resigned July 31, 2019
Argyle-Barrington	Colton LeBlanc	Progressive Conservative	2019	Elected September 3, 2019
Bedford	Kelly Regan	Liberal	2009	
Cape Breton Centre	Tammy Martin	NDP	2017	Resigned February 6, 2020
Cape Breton Centre	Kendra Coombes	NDP	2020	Elected March 10, 2020
Cape Breton-Richmond	Alana Paon	Progressive Conservative	2017	Progressive Conservative until June 24, 2019; removed from caucus after refusing to comply with a motion from the House of Assembly management commission to have the driveway to her constituency office paved to bring her office in line with the province's accessibility rules.
Cape Breton-Richmond	Alana Paon	Independent	2017	Progressive Conservative until June 24, 2019; removed from caucus after refusing to comply with a motion from the House of Assembly management commission to have the driveway to her constituency office paved to bring her office in line with the province's accessibility rules.
Chester-St. Margaret's	Hugh MacKay	Liberal	2017	Liberal until February 23, 2020; resigned from caucus after facing charges of impaired driving.
Chester-St. Margaret's	Hugh MacKay	Independent	2017	Liberal until February 23, 2020; resigned from caucus after facing charges of impaired driving.
Clare-Digby	Gordon Wilson	Liberal	2013	
Clayton Park West	Rafah DiCostanzo	Liberal	2017	
Colchester-Musquodoboit Valley	Larry Harrison	Progressive Conservative	2013	
Colchester North	Karen Casey	Liberal	2006 (Note: First elected as a Progressive Conservative)	
Cole Harbour-Eastern Passage	Barbara Adams	Progressive Conservative	2017	
Cole Harbour-Portland Valley	Tony Ince	Liberal	2013	
Cumberland North	Elizabeth Smith-McCrossin	Progressive Conservative	2017	Progressive Conservative until June 24, 2021; removed from caucus after encouraging a protest that blocked the Nova Scotia-New Brunswick border for more than 24 hours.
Cumberland North	Elizabeth Smith-McCrossin	Independent	2017	Progressive Conservative until June 24, 2021; removed from caucus after encouraging a protest that blocked the Nova Scotia-New Brunswick border for more than 24 hours.
Cumberland South	Jamie Baillie	Progressive Conservative	2010	Resigned January 24, 2018
Cumberland South	Tory Rushton	Progressive Conservative	2018	Elected June 19, 2018
Dartmouth East	Tim Halman	Progressive Conservative	2017	
Dartmouth North	Susan Leblanc	NDP	2017	
Dartmouth South	Claudia Chender	NDP	2017	
Eastern Shore	Kevin Murphy	Liberal	2013	
Fairview-Clayton Park	Patricia Arab	Liberal	2013	
Glace Bay	Geoff MacLellan	Liberal	2010	
Guysborough–Eastern Shore–Tracadie	Lloyd Hines	Liberal	2013	
Halifax Armdale	Lena Diab	Liberal	2013	
Halifax Atlantic	Brendan Maguire	Liberal	2013	
Halifax Chebucto	Gary Burrill	NDP	2009, (Note: Colchester-Musquodoboit Valley) 2017	Leader of the New Democratic Party
Halifax Citadel-Sable Island	Labi Kousoulis	Liberal	2013	
Halifax Needham	Lisa Roberts	NDP	2016	
Hammonds Plains-Lucasville	Ben Jessome	Liberal	2013	
Hants East	Margaret Miller	Liberal	2013	Resigned June 1, 2021
Hants East	Vacant		2013	Resigned June 1, 2021
Hants West	Chuck Porter	Liberal	2006	
Inverness	Allan MacMaster	Progressive Conservative	2009	
Kings North	John Lohr	Progressive Conservative	2013	
Kings South	Keith Irving	Liberal	2013	
Kings West	Leo Glavine	Liberal	2003	
Lunenburg	Suzanne Lohnes-Croft	Liberal	2013	
Lunenburg West	Mark Furey	Liberal	2013	
Northside-Westmount	Eddie Orrell	Progressive Conservative	2011	Resigned July 31, 2019
Northside-Westmount	Murray Ryan	Progressive Conservative	2019	Elected September 3, 2019
Pictou Centre	Pat Dunn	Progressive Conservative	2006, 2013	
Pictou East	Tim Houston	Progressive Conservative	2013	Leader of the Opposition
Pictou West	Karla MacFarlane	Progressive Conservative	2013	
Preston-Dartmouth	Keith Colwell	Liberal	1993, (Note: Eastern Shore) 2003	
Queens-Shelburne	Kim Masland	Progressive Conservative	2017	
Sackville-Beaver Bank	Brad Johns	Progressive Conservative	2017	
Sackville-Cobequid	Dave Wilson	NDP	2003	Resigned November 16, 2018
Sackville-Cobequid	Steve Craig	Progressive Conservative	2019	Elected June 19, 2019
Sydney-Whitney Pier	Derek Mombourquette	Liberal	2015	
Sydney River-Mira-Louisbourg	Alfie MacLeod	Progressive Conservative	1995, 2006	Resigned July 31, 2019
Sydney River-Mira-Louisbourg	Brian Comer	Progressive Conservative	2019	Elected September 3, 2019
Timberlea-Prospect	Iain Rankin	Liberal	2013	Premier of Nova Scotia
Truro-Bible Hill-Millbrook-Salmon River	Lenore Zann	NDP	2009	Resigned September 12, 2019
Truro-Bible Hill-Millbrook-Salmon River	Lenore Zann	Independent	2009	Resigned September 12, 2019
Truro-Bible Hill-Millbrook-Salmon River	Dave Ritcey	Progressive Conservative	2020	Elected March 10, 2020
Victoria-The Lakes	Keith Bain	Progressive Conservative	2006, 2017	
Waverley-Fall River-Beaverbank	Bill Horne	Liberal	2013	
Yarmouth	Zach Churchill	Liberal	2010	

== Seating plan ==
Paon	LeBlanc	Comer	Ritcey	Johns	MacKay
Ryan	Smith-McCrossin	Craig	Rushton	Halman	Lohr	Adams	Roberts	Coombes
Harrison	Dunn	Bain	Masland	MacFarlane	HOUSTON	MacMaster	Chender	BURRILL	Leblanc
Murphy
Churchill	Delorey	Lohnes-Croft	MacLellan	RANKIN	Regan	Irving	Diab	Colwell	Mombourquette	Kousoulis
Casey	Glavine	Arab	Jessome	Ince	Maguire	Hines	Porter
Furey	DiCostanzo	Horne	Wilson

== Membership changes in the 63rd Assembly ==
Number of members per party by date	2017	2018			2019						2020			2021		
Number of members per party by date	May 30	Jan 24	Jun 19	Nov 16	Jun 9	Jun 19	Jun 24	Jul 31	Sep 3	Sep 12	Feb 6	Feb 23	Mar 10	May 3	Jun 1	Jun 24
Liberal	27											26		25	24	
Progressive Conservative	17	16	17			18	17	14	17				18			17
NDP	7			6	5						4		5			
Independent	0				1		2			1		2				3
Vacant	0	1	0	1		0		3	0	1	2		0	1	2	

Membership changes in the 63rd General Assembly
Date	Name	District	Party	Reason
May 30, 2017	See list of members			Election day of the 40th Nova Scotia general election
January 24, 2018	Jamie Baillie	Cumberland South	Progressive Conservative	Resignation
June 19, 2018	Tory Rushton	Cumberland South	Progressive Conservative	Elected in by-election
November 16, 2018	Dave Wilson	Sackville-Cobequid	NDP	Resignation
June 9, 2019	Lenore Zann	Truro-Bible Hill-Millbrook-Salmon River	Independent	Changing affiliation as means to run in federal politics as a Liberal candidate
June 19, 2019	Steve Craig	Sackville-Cobequid	Progressive Conservative	Elected in by-election
June 24, 2019	Alana Paon	Cape Breton-Richmond	Independent	Removed from the Progressive Conservative caucus
July 31, 2019	Chris d'Entremont	Argyle-Barrington	Progressive Conservative	Resignation as means to run in federal politics for the Conservative Party.
July 31, 2019	Eddie Orrell	Northside-Westmount	Progressive Conservative	Resignation as means to run in federal politics for the Conservative Party.
July 31, 2019	Alfie MacLeod	Sydney River-Mira-Louisbourg	Progressive Conservative	Resignation as means to run in federal politics for the Conservative Party.
September 3, 2019	Colton LeBlanc	Argyle-Barrington	Progressive Conservative	Elected in by-election
September 3, 2019	Murray Ryan	Northside-Westmount	Progressive Conservative	Elected in by-election
September 3, 2019	Brian Comer	Sydney River-Mira-Louisbourg	Progressive Conservative	Elected in by-election
September 12, 2019	Lenore Zann	Truro-Bible Hill-Millbrook-Salmon River	Independent	Resignation as means to run in federal politics for the Liberal Party.
February 6, 2020	Tammy Martin	Cape Breton Centre	NDP	Resignation
February 23, 2020	Hugh MacKay	Chester-St. Margaret's	Independent	Resigned from Liberal caucus
March 10, 2020	Kendra Coombes	Cape Breton Centre	NDP	Elected in by-election
March 10, 2020	Dave Ritcey	Truro-Bible Hill-Millbrook-Salmon River	Progressive Conservative	Elected in by-election
May 3, 2021	Stephen McNeil	Annapolis	Liberal	Resignation
June 1, 2021	Margaret Miller	Hants East	Liberal	Resignation
June 24, 2021	Elizabeth Smith-McCrossin	Cumberland North	Independent	Removed from the Progressive Conservative caucus

== Notes ==
Preceded by 62nd General Assembly of Nova Scotia	General Assemblies of Nova Scotia; 2017–2021	Succeeded by 64th General Assembly of Nova Scotia
