= 2021 Nova Scotia general election =

Canadian provincial election

- August 17, 2021

55 seats in the Nova Scotia House of Assembly 28 seats needed for a majority
- Opinion polls
- Turnout: 55.07% ▲1.72 pp
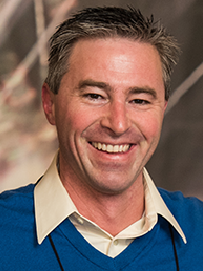

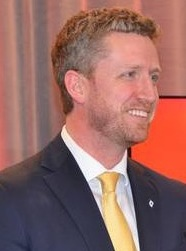

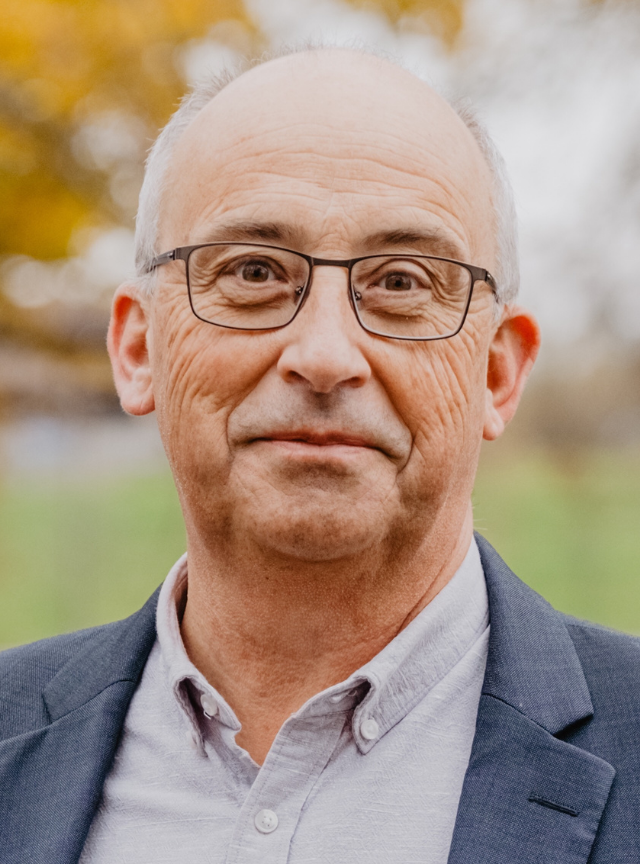
	Majority party	Minority party	Third party
Leader	Tim Houston	Iain Rankin	Gary Burrill
Party	Progressive Conservative	Liberal	New Democratic
Leader since	October 27, 2018	February 6, 2021	February 27, 2016
Leader's seat	Pictou East	Timberlea-Prospect	Halifax Chebucto
Last election	17 seats, 35.73%	27 seats, 39.47%	7 seats, 21.51%
Seats won	31	17	6
Seat change	▲14	▼10	▼1
Popular vote	162,473	155,026	88,477
Percentage	38.44%	36.67%	20.93%
Swing	▲2.71 pp	▼2.80 pp	▼0.58 pp
- Popular vote by riding. As this is an FPTP election, seat totals are not determined by popular vote, but instead via results by each riding. Click the map for more details.
Premier before election
Iain Rankin
Liberal
Premier after election
Tim Houston
Progressive Conservative

The 2021 Nova Scotia general election was held on August 17, 2021, to elect members to the 64th General Assembly of Nova Scotia.

In a major upset, Tim Houston led the Progressive Conservatives to power for the first time since 2006, and with a majority government for the first time since 1999. With a popular vote share of 38.44%, the PCs won the smallest winning vote share of any majority government in Nova Scotian electoral history, and won nearly twice the number of seats as the Liberals, despite their overall vote share differing by less than 2%.

Elizabeth Smith-McCrossin’s victory in Cumberland North marked the first occasion since 1988 that an independent candidate won election to the House of Assembly. A record number of four Black Nova Scotians were elected MLAs; prior to this election, only five Black MLAs had ever been elected in Nova Scotia.

== Redistribution of ridings ==
In April 2019, the Electoral Boundaries Commission released its report which recommended changing the number of electoral districts from 51 to 55, including reinstating the four former districts of Argyle, Clare, Preston and Richmond. In October 2019, the Nova Scotia Legislature passed implementing legislation, providing for the following changes to take effect at the forthcoming election.

Abolished ridings	New ridings
Renaming of districts
Argyle-Barrington	Argyle
Cape Breton Centre	Cape Breton Centre-Whitney Pier
Cape Breton-Richmond	Richmond
Glace Bay	Glace Bay-Dominion
Guysborough-Eastern Shore-Tracadie	Guysborough-Tracadie
Preston-Dartmouth	Preston
Sackville-Beaver Bank	Sackville-Uniacke
Sydney River-Mira-Louisbourg	Cape Breton East
Sydney-Whitney Pier	Sydney-Membertou
Division of districts
Bedford	Bedford Basin; Bedford South
Queens-Shelburne	Queens; Shelburne
Reorganization of districts
Annapolis; Clare-Digby	Annapolis; Clare; Digby-Annapolis
Cole Harbour-Portland Valley; Cole Harbour-Eastern Passage	Cole Harbour; Cole Harbour-Dartmouth; Eastern Passage

== Timeline ==
- May 30, 2017 – The Liberal Party, led by Stephen McNeil, wins the 2017 Nova Scotia general election, the Progressive Conservative Association stay as the official opposition, and the New Democratic Party remain at third party status.
- January 24, 2018 - Jamie Baillie resigns as leader of the Progressive Conservative Association, and MLA Karla MacFarlane becomes interim leader.
- October 27, 2018 - Tim Houston is elected leader of the Progressive Conservative Association.
- August 6, 2020 - Premier Stephen McNeil announces he will resign as leader of the Liberal Party and as Premier of Nova Scotia in early 2021.
- February 6, 2021 - Iain Rankin is elected as leader of the Liberal Party.
- February 23, 2021 - Iain Rankin is officially sworn in as the 29th Premier of Nova Scotia.
- July 17, 2021 - Premier Iain Rankin calls a general election for August 17, 2021.
Changes in seats held (2017–2021)

Seat	Before				Change		
Seat	Date	Member	Party	Reason	Date	Member	Party
Cumberland South	January 24, 2018	Jamie Baillie	█ PC	Resignation (Note: amid an allegation of harassment)	June 19, 2018	Tory Rushton	█ PC
Sackville-Cobequid	November 16, 2018	Dave Wilson	█ New Democratic	Resignation	June 18, 2019	Steve Craig	█ PC
Truro-Bible Hill-Millbrook-Salmon River	June 9, 2019	Lenore Zann	█ New Democratic	Resigned from caucus (Note: in order to seek the federal Liberal nomination in Cumberland-Colchester)			█ Independent
Cape Breton-Richmond	June 24, 2019	Alana Paon	█ PC	Removed from caucus (Note: amid a conflict over constituency office accessibility)			█ Independent
Argyle-Barrington	July 31, 2019	Chris d'Entremont	█ PC	Resignation (Note: to run in the federal district of West Nova)	September 3, 2019	Colton LeBlanc	█ PC
Northside-Westmount	July 31, 2019	Eddie Orrell	█ PC	Resignation (Note: to run in the federal district of Sydney-Victoria)	September 3, 2019	Murray Ryan	█ PC
Sydney River-Mira-Louisbourg	July 31, 2019	Alfie MacLeod	█ PC	Resignation (Note: to run in the federal district of Cape Breton-Canso)	September 3, 2019	Brian Comer	█ PC
Truro-Bible Hill-Millbrook-Salmon River	September 12, 2019	Lenore Zann	█ Independent	Resignation (Note: to run in the federal district of Cumberland—Colchester)	March 10, 2020	Dave Ritcey	█ PC
Cape Breton Centre	February 6, 2020	Tammy Martin	█ New Democratic	Resignation (Note: due to ongoing health issues)	March 10, 2020	Kendra Coombes	█ New Democratic
Chester-St. Margaret's	February 23, 2020	Hugh MacKay	█ Liberal	Resigned from caucus (Note: amid charges of impaired driving)			█ Independent
Annapolis	May 3, 2021	Stephen McNeil	█ Liberal	Resignation (Note: retired from political life)			
Hants East	June 1, 2021	Margaret Miller	█ Liberal	Resignation (Note: retired from political life)			
Cumberland North	June 24, 2021	Elizabeth Smith-McCrossin	█ PC	Removed from caucus (Note: amid encouraging a protest that blocked the provincial border)			█ Independent

== Leaders' debates ==
2021 Nova Scotia general election debates
Date	Organizers	Venue	Moderator(s)	P Participant A Absent invitee N Non-invitee					Source
Date	Organizers	Venue	Moderator(s)	Liberal	PC	NDP	Green	Atlantica	Source
July 28, 2021	CBC Nova Scotia	Neptune Theatre, Halifax	Tom Murphy; Amy Smith	P Rankin	P Houston	P Burrill	N Alexander	N Dean	
August 5, 2021	CTV Atlantic	CTV Studios, Halifax	Steve Murphy	P Rankin	P Houston	P Burrill	N Alexander	N Dean	

== Results ==
=== Results by party ===
↓
31	17	6	1
Progressive Conservative	Liberal	New Democratic	Ind

Summary of the 2021 Nova Scotia House of Assembly election
Party	Leader	Candidates	Votes				Seats		
Party	Leader	Candidates	#	±	%	Change (pp)	2017	2021	±
Progressive Conservative	Tim Houston	55	162,473	19,119▲	38.59	2.86	17	31 / 55	14▲
Liberal	Iain Rankin	55	155,026	3,357▼	36.82	-2.65	27	17 / 55	10▼
New Democratic	Gary Burrill	55	88,477	2,178▲	21.02	-0.49	7	7 / 55	1▼
Green	Jessica Alexander	43	9,042	2,085▼	2.15	-0.63			
Independent		6	4,960	4,513▲	1.18	1.07	–	1 / 55	1▲
Atlantica	Jonathan Geoffrey Dean	16	1,023	609▼	0.24	-0.16			
Total		230	421,001		100.00%				
Rejected ballots			1,711	412▼					
Turnout			422,712	19,347▲	55.07%	1.72▲			
Registered voters			767,618	11,505▲					

=== Synopsis of results ===
2021 Nova Scotia riding flips by party

= Newly created districts
= Open seat
= Turnout is above provincial average
= Winning candidate was in previous Legislature
= Incumbent had switched allegiance
= Previously incumbent in another riding
= Not incumbent; was previously elected to the Legislature
= Incumbency arose from byelection gain
= Other incumbents renominated
= Previously an MP in the House of Commons of Canada
= Multiple candidates

Results by riding - 2021 Nova Scotia general election
Riding	Region	Winning party							Turnout (Note: including spoilt ballots)	Votes (Note: Minor political parties receiving less than 1% of the national popular vote are aggregated under "Other"; independent candidates are aggregated separately)						
Riding	Region	2017 (Redist.) (Note: effect of 2019 restribution on previous election results, per "Transposition of Votes from the 2017 Provincial General Election to 2019 Electoral District Boundaries" (PDF). Elections Nova Scotia. April 12, 2021. Archived from the original (PDF) on July 17, 2021.)	1st place	Votes	Share	Margin #	Margin %	2nd place	Turnout							Total
Riding	Region	2017 (Redist.)	1st place	Votes	Share	Margin #	Margin %	2nd place	Turnout	PC	Lib	NDP	Grn	Atl	Ind	Total
Annapolis	Annapolis Valley	Lib	Lib	4,231	49.62%	1,478	17.33%	PC	57.80%	2,753	4,231	1,127	306	109	–	8,526
Antigonish	Central Nova	Lib	PC	4,707	49.98%	1,710	18.16%	Lib	64.78%	4,707	2,997	1,552	128	34	–	9,418
Argyle (Note: Historically Acadian riding)	South Shore	PC	PC	3,649	82.35%	3,014	68.02%	Lib	67.54%	3,649	635	63	84	–	–	4,431
Bedford Basin	Suburban Halifax	Lib	Lib	3,700	50.87%	1,826	25.11%	PC	55.61%	1,874	3,700	1,554	146	–	–	7,274
Bedford South	Suburban Halifax	Lib	Lib	3,586	45.37%	1,230	15.64%	PC	56.03%	2,338	3,568	1,763	140	55	–	7,864
Cape Breton Centre-Whitney Pier	Cape Breton	NDP	NDP	3,309	42.15%	121	1.54%	Lib	53.66%	1,281	3,188	3,309	72	–	–	7,850
Cape Breton East	Cape Breton	PC	PC	3,897	46.27%	803	9.54%	Lib	61.42%	3,897	3,094	1,432	–	–	–	8,423
Chester-St. Margaret's	South Shore	Lib	PC	3,788	40.06%	232	2.45%	Lib	62.48%	3,788	3,556	1,626	417	68	–	9,455
Clare	Annapolis Valley	Lib	Lib	2,322	49.89%	301	6.46%	PC	67.84%	2,021	2,322	153	158	–	–	4,654
Clayton Park West	Central Halifax	Lib	Lib	3,603	47.60%	1,728	22.83%	PC	52.63%	1,875	3,603	1,836	210	46	–	7,570
Colchester-Musquodoboit Valley	Fundy-Northeast	PC	PC	4,117	55.13%	2,204	29.51%	Lib	52.36%	4,117	1,913	1,438	–	–	–	7,468
Colchester North	Fundy-Northeast	Lib	PC	4,477	53.18%	1,796	21.34%	Lib	56.67%	4,477	2,681	955	252	54	–	8,419
Cole Harbour	Dartmouth/Cole Harbour/Eastern Shore	Lib	Lib	2,118	39.75%	414	7.77%	PC	53.30%	1,704	2,118	1,431	–	75	–	5,328
Cole Harbour-Dartmouth	Dartmouth/Cole Harbour/Eastern Shore	Lib	Lib	5,144	52.24%	2,215	22.49%	PC	61.62%	2,929	5,144	1,558	215	–	–	9,846
Cumberland North	Fundy-Northeast	PC	Ind	4,235	53.87%	1,747	22.22%	Lib	58.59%	569	2,488	569	–	–	4,235	7,861
Cumberland South	Fundy-Northeast	PC	PC	3,900	68.47%	2,808	49.30%	Lib	52.12%	3,900	1,092	524 (Note: Larry Duchesne was previously a member of the Legislative Assembly of Prince Edward Island and leader of the Prince Edward Island New Democratic Party.)	180	–	–	5,696
Dartmouth East	Dartmouth/Cole Harbour/Eastern Shore	PC	PC	3,260	38.99%	360	4.31%	Lib	57.44%	3,260	2,900	1,974	187	41	–	8,362
Dartmouth North	Dartmouth/Cole Harbour/Eastern Shore	NDP	NDP	3,731	49.75%	1,370	18.27%	Lib	46.02%	1,278	2,361	3,731	129	–	–	7,499
Dartmouth South	Dartmouth/Cole Harbour/Eastern Shore	NDP	NDP	4,209	58.13%	2,606	35.99%	Lib	52.96%	1,262	1,603	4,209	167	–	–	7,241
Digby-Annapolis	Annapolis Valley	Lib	PC	2,636	49.55%	771	14.49%	Lib	52.98%	2,636	1,865	626	113	80	–	5,320
Eastern Passage	Dartmouth/Cole Harbour/Eastern Shore	PC	PC	2,469	44.82%	1,025	18.61%	Lib	52.65%	2,469	1,444	1,222	374	–	–	5,509
Eastern Shore	Dartmouth/Cole Harbour/Eastern Shore	Lib	PC	4,264	45.82%	1,095	11.76%	Lib	56.92%	4,264	3,169	1,618	254	–	–	9,305
Fairview-Clayton Park	Central Halifax	Lib	Lib	2,892	38.51%	105	1.40%	NDP	47.58%	1,678	2,892	2,787	153	–	–	7,510
Glace Bay-Dominion	Cape Breton	Lib	PC	2,754	34.61%	29	0.37%	NDP	59.37%	2,754	2,479	2,725	–	–	–	7,958
Guysborough–Tracadie	Central Nova	Lib	PC	3,281	63.39%	1,710	33.04%	Lib	66.81%	3,281	1,571	247	77	–	–	5,176
Halifax Armdale	Central Halifax	Lib	Lib	3,070	40.35%	477	6.27%	NDP	54.02%	1,681	3,070	2,593	202	–	63	7,609
Halifax Atlantic	Suburban Halifax	Lib	Lib	4,213	55.22%	2,473	32.41%	NDP	47.27%	1,493	4,213	1,740	183	–	–	7,629
Halifax Chebucto	Central Halifax	NDP	NDP	4,009	51.99%	1,531	19.85%	Lib	62.01%	911	2,478	4,009	313	–	–	7,711
Halifax Citadel-Sable Island	Central Halifax	Lib	NDP	3,397	42.31%	441	5.49%	Lib	48.92%	1,425	2,956	3,397	250	–	–	8,028
Halifax Needham	Central Halifax	NDP	NDP	5,308	58.96%	2,691	29.89%	Lib	53.34%	904	2,617	5,308	173	–	–	9,002
Hammonds Plains-Lucasville	Suburban Halifax	Lib	Lib	3,697	46.06%	832	10.36%	PC	57.43%	2,865	3,697	1,333	131	–	–	8,026
Hants East	Fundy-Northeast	Lib	PC	3,328	37.36%	89	1.00%	Lib	51.19%	3,328	3,239	2,142	199	–	–	8,908
Hants West	Annapolis Valley	Lib	PC	3,968	43.11%	141	1.53%	Lib	55.98%	3,968	3,827	1,015	273	121	–	9,204
Inverness	Cape Breton	PC	PC	4,833	55.85%	1,721	19.89%	Lib	61.58%	4,833	3,112	708	–	–	–	8,653
Kings North	Annapolis Valley	PC	PC	3,971	44.70%	1,369	15.41%	Lib	55.30%	3,971	2,602	1,876	391	43	–	8,883
Kings South	Annapolis Valley	Lib	Lib	4,049	44.11%	1,003	10.93%	PC	55.70%	3,046	4,049	1,808	276	–	–	9,179
Kings West	Annapolis Valley	Lib	PC	4,592	49.45%	736	7.93%	Lib	56.65%	4,592	3,856	549	216	74	–	9,287
Lunenburg	South Shore	Lib	PC	3,544	42.01%	629	7.46%	Lib	58.14%	3,544	2,915	1,750	171	57	–	8,437
Lunenburg West	South Shore	Lib	PC	4,065	44.42%	868	9.48%	Lib	55.65%	4,065	3,197	1,709	180	–	–	9,151
Northside-Westmount	Cape Breton	PC	Lib	4,030	46.86%	890	10.35%	PC	53.34%	3,140	4,030	1,430	–	–	–	8,600
Pictou Centre	Central Nova	PC	PC	4,092	55.77%	1,823	24.84%	Lib	57.07%	4,092	2,269	862	114	–	–	7,337
Pictou East	Central Nova	PC	PC	4,918	69.68%	3,333	47.22%	Lib	61.44%	4,918	1,585	500	–	55	–	7,058
Pictou West	Central Nova	PC	PC	4,487	63.62%	2,977	42.21%	Lib	62.1%	4,487	1,510	872	124	–	60	7,053
Preston (Note: Historically Black riding)	Dartmouth/Cole Harbour/Eastern Shore	Lib	Lib	2,226	43.38%	754	14.69%	PC	46.78%	1,472	2,226	1,433	–	–	–	5,131
Queens	South Shore	PC	PC	3,627	70.37%	2,576	49.98%	Lib	58.36%	3,627	1,051	323	153	–	–	5,154
Richmond	Cape Breton	Lib	PC	2,773	50.86%	764	14.01%	Lib	71.61%	2,773	2,009	274	–	–	396	5,452
Sackville-Cobequid	Suburban Halifax	NDP	PC	3,426	43.33%	849	10.74%	NDP	51.74%	3,426	1,701	2,577	203	–	–	7,907
Sackville-Uniacke	Suburban Halifax	PC	PC	3,104	43.82%	781	11.02%	Lib	51.44%	3,104	2,323	1,535	121	–	–	7,083
Shelburne	South Shore	PC	PC	3,905	62.56%	2,422	38.80%	Lib	54.50%	3,905	1,483	753	101	–	–	6,242
Sydney-Membertou	Cape Breton	Lib	Lib	4,561	54.27%	2,184	25.99%	NDP	52.66%	1,467	4,561	2,377	–	–	–	8,405
Timberlea-Prospect	Suburban Halifax	Lib	Lib	5,181	54.38%	2,861	30.03%	PC	55.68%	2,320	5,181	1,647	250	40	90	9,528
Truro-Bible Hill-Millbrook-Salmon River	Fundy-Northeast	NDP	PC	4,025	47.85%	1,484	17.64%	Lib	51.11%	4,025	2,541	1,398	448	–	–	8,412
Victoria-The Lakes	Cape Breton	PC	PC	3,536	54.37%	1,312	20.17%	Lib	51.50%	3,536	2,224	627	–	–	116	6,503
Waverley-Fall River-Beaver Bank	Suburban Halifax	PC	PC	3,938	40.38%	392	4.02%	Lib	56.55%	3,938	3,546	1,581	617	71	–	9,753
Yarmouth	South Shore	Lib	Lib	4,344	56.32%	1,488	19.29%	PC	55.17%	2,856	4,344	322	191	–	–	7,713

=== Comparative results (2021 vs 2017 transposed results) ===
Summary of riding results by turnout, vote share for winning candidate, and swing (vs 2017 transposed results)
Riding and winning party			Turnout (pp) (Note: No attempt was made to estimate the effect redistribution would have had on reported turnouts.)	Vote share		Swing (Note: Positive indicates improvement to standing of party winning in 1981; negative points to 1981's second-place party being swung to.)
Riding and winning party			Turnout (pp)	%	Change (pp)	Change (pp)
Annapolis	Lib	Hold	57.80	49.62	-16.49	-16.94
Antigonish	PC	Gain	64.78	49.98	14.86	-13.21
Argyle	PC	Hold	67.54	82.35	15.96	15.71
Bedford Basin	Lib	Hold	55.61	50.87	-1.88	1.61
Bedford South	Lib	Hold	56.03	45.37	-5.92	-3.09
Cape Breton Centre-Whitney Pier	NDP	Hold	53.66	42.15	-1.17	-3.86
Cape Breton East	PC	Hold	61.42	46.27	-20.09	-16.00
Chester-St. Margaret's	PC	Gain	62.48	40.06	14.40	9.80
Clare	Lib	Hold	67.84	49.89	-1.34	-7.23
Clayton Park West	Lib	Hold	52.63	47.6	1.97	1.68
Colchester-Musquodoboit Valley	PC	Hold	52.36	55.13	4.55	2.94
Colchester North	PC	Gain	56.67	53.18	12.14	-13.40
Cole Harbour	Lib	Hold	53.30	39.75	5.01	2.83
Cole Harbour-Dartmouth	Lib	Hold	61.62	52.24	11.16	6.30
Cumberland North	Ind	Gain	58.59	53.87	New	-18.74
Cumberland South	PC	Hold	52.12	68.47	16.99	19.15
Dartmouth East	PC	Hold	57.44	38.99	-2.17	0.96
Dartmouth North	NDP	Hold	46.02	49.75	10.40	6.80
Dartmouth South	NDP	Hold	52.96	58.13	15.79	14.50
Digby-Annapolis	PC	Gain	52.98	49.55	26.02	-21.37
Eastern Passage	PC	Hold	52.65	44.82	9.11	8.80
Eastern Shore	PC	Gain	56.92	45.82	14.73	-10.22
Fairview-Clayton Park	Lib	Hold	47.58	38.51	-1.67	-4.83
Glace Bay-Dominion	PC	Gain	59.37	34.61	-4.52	-4.46
Guysborough–Tracadie	PC	Gain	66.81	63.39	20.98	-16.97
Halifax Armdale	Lib	Hold	54.02	40.35	-3.22	-2.28
Halifax Atlantic	Lib	Hold	47.27	55.22	-0.26	-0.17
Halifax Chebucto	NDP	Hold	62.01	51.99	5.33	5.73
Halifax Citadel-Sable Island	NDP	Gain	48.92	42.31	12.55	-8.65
Halifax Needham	NDP	Hold	53.34	58.96	7.67	3.51
Hammonds Plains-Lucasville	Lib	Hold	57.43	46.06	-0.62	-1.70
Hants East	PC	Gain	51.19	37.36	2.92	-5.22
Hants West	PC	Gain	55.98	43.11	14.18	-13.67
Inverness	PC	Hold	61.58	55.85	-3.41	-3.58
Kings North	PC	Hold	55.30	44.7	-1.24	1.46
Kings South	Lib	Hold	55.70	44.11	-2.48	-4.35
Kings West	PC	Gain	56.65	49.45	12.28	-11.41
Lunenburg	PC	Gain	58.14	42.01	11.09	-8.01
Lunenburg West	PC	Gain	55.65	44.42	16.69	-14.42
Northside-Westmount	Lib	Gain	53.34	46.86	25.66	-26.30
Pictou Centre	PC	Hold	57.07	55.77	2.36	-0.35
Pictou East	PC	Hold	61.44	69.68	-4.18	-4.33
Pictou West	PC	Hold	62.10	63.62	1.04	3.67
Preston	Lib	Hold	46.78	43.38	-5.65	-5.01
Queens	PC	Hold	58.36	70.37	19.96	13.50
Richmond	PC	Gain	71.61	50.86	7.47	-7.72
Sackville-Cobequid	PC	Gain	51.74	43.33	17.95	-3.56
Sackville-Uniacke	PC	Hold	51.44	43.82	0.65	0.52
Shelburne	PC	Hold	54.50	62.56	16.28	13.15
Sydney-Membertou	Lib	Hold	52.66	54.27	16.85	10.46
Timberlea-Prospect	Lib	Hold	55.68	54.38	4.98	2.10
Truro-Bible Hill-Millbrook-Salmon River	PC	Gain	51.11	47.85	15.87	-21.58
Victoria-The Lakes	PC	Hold	51.50	54.37	-5.18	-6.28
Waverley-Fall River-Beaver Bank	PC	Hold	56.55	40.38	2.86	1.88
Yarmouth	Lib	Hold	55.17	56.32	-11.83	-11.68

=== Summary analysis ===
Elections to the 64th Legislature of Nova Scotia – seats won/lost by party, 2017–2021 (after applying effect of redistribution)
Party	2017 (redist.)	Gain from (loss to)							2021
Party	2017 (redist.)	Lib		PC		NDP		Ind	2021
Progressive Conservative	18	13	(1)			2		(1)	31
Liberal	30			1	(13)		(1)		17
New Democratic	7	1			(2)				6
Independent	–			1					1
Total	55	14	(1)	2	(15)	2	(1)	(1)	55

== Incumbents not running for reelection ==
The following MLAs announced that they would not run in the 2021 general election:

Independent

- Hugh MacKay (Chester-St. Margaret's)

Liberal Party

- Karen Casey (Colchester North)
- Keith Colwell (Preston-Dartmouth)
- Lena Diab (Halifax Armdale)
- Mark Furey (Lunenburg West)
- Leo Glavine (Kings West)
- Bill Horne (Waverley-Fall River-Beaver Bank)
- Geoff MacLellan (Glace Bay)
- Chuck Porter (Hants West)
- Gordon Wilson (Clare-Digby)

New Democratic Party

- Lisa Roberts (Halifax Needham)

== Candidates by constituency ==
Legend

- **bold** denotes party leader
- † denotes an incumbent who is not running for re-election or was defeated in nomination contest

=== Annapolis Valley ===
Electoral district	Candidates					Incumbent
Electoral district	Liberal	PC	NDP	Green	Atlantica	Incumbent
Annapolis	Carman Kerr; 4,231; 49.62%	Jennifer Ehrenfeld-Poole; 2,753; 32.29%	Cheryl Burbidge; 1,127; 13.22%	Krista Grear; 306; 3.59%	Mark Robertson; 109; 1.28%	Vacant
Clare	Ronnie LeBlanc; 2,322; 49.89%	Carl Deveau; 2,021; 43.43%	Cameron Pye; 153; 3.29%	Claire McDonald; 158; 3.39%		Gordon Wilson†; Clare-Digby
Digby-Annapolis	Jimmy MacAlpine; 1,865; 35.06%	Jill Balser; 2,636; 49.55%	Michael Carty; 626; 11.77%	Jessica Walker; 113; 2.12%	Tyler Ducharme; 80; 1.50%	New riding
Hants West	Brian Casey; 3,827; 41.58%	Melissa Sheehy-Richard; 3,968; 43.11%	Caet Moir; 1,015; 11.03%	Jenn Kang; 273; 2.97%	Gordon J. Berry; 121; 1.31%	Chuck Porter†
Kings North	Geof Turner; 2,602; 29.29%	John Lohr; 3,971; 44.70%	Erin Patterson; 1,876; 21.12%	Doug Hickman; 391; 4.40%	Paul Dunn; 43; 0.48%	John Lohr
Kings South	Keith Irving; 4,049; 44.11%	Derrick Kimball; 3,046; 33.18%	Mercedes Brian; 1,808; 19.70%	Barry Leslie; 276; 3.01%		Keith Irving
Kings West	Emily Lutz; 3,856; 41.52%	Chris Palmer; 4,592; 49.45%	Jason Langille; 549; 5.91%	Sue Earle; 216; 2.33%	Rick Mehta; 74; 0.80%	Leo Glavine†

=== South Shore ===
Electoral district	Candidates					Incumbent
Electoral district	Liberal	PC	NDP	Green	Atlantica	Incumbent
Argyle	Nick d'Entremont; 635; 14.33%	Colton LeBlanc; 3,649; 82.35%	Robin Smith; 63; 1.42%	Corey Clamp; 84; 1.90%		Colton LeBlanc; Argyle-Barrington
Chester-St. Margaret's	Jacob Killawee; 3,556; 37.61%	Danielle Barkhouse; 3,788; 40.06%	Amy Stewart Reitsma; 1,626; 17.20%	**Jessica Alexander**; 417; 4.41%	Steven Foster; 68; 0.72%	Hugh MacKay†
Lunenburg	Suzanne Lohnes-Croft; 2,915; 34.55%	Susan Corkum-Greek; 3,544; 42.01%	Alison Smith; 1,750; 20.74%	Thomas Trappenberg; 171; 2.03%	John Giannakos; 57; 0.68%	Suzanne Lohnes-Croft
Lunenburg West	Jennifer Naugler; 3,197; 34.94%	Becky Druhan; 4,065; 44.42%	Merydie Ross; 1,709; 18.68%	Eric Wade; 180; 1.97%		Mark Furey†
Queens	Susan MacLeod; 1,051; 20.39%	Kim Masland; 3,627; 70.37%	Mary Dahr; 323; 6.27%	Brian Muldoon; 153; 2.97%		Kim Masland; Queens-Shelburne
Shelburne	Penny Smith; 1,483; 23.76%	Nolan Young; 3,905; 62.56%	Darren Stoddard; 753; 12.06%	Steve Hirchak; 101; 1.62%		New riding
Yarmouth	Zach Churchill; 4,344; 56.32%	Candice Clairmont; 2,856; 37.03%	SJ Rogers; 322; 4.17%	Adam Randall; 191; 2.48%		Zach Churchill

=== Fundy-Northeast ===
Electoral district	Candidates						Incumbent
Electoral district	Liberal	PC	NDP	Green	Atlantica	Independent	Incumbent
Colchester-Musquodoboit Valley	Rhonda MacLellan; 1,913; 25.62%	Larry Harrison; 4,117; 55.13%	Janet Moulton; 1,438; 19.26%				Larry Harrison
Colchester North	Merlyn Smith; 2,681; 31.84%	Tom Taggart; 4,477; 53.18%	Sean Foley; 955; 11.34%	Ivan Drouin; 252; 2.99%	Stephan Sante; 54; 0.64%		Karen Casey†
Cumberland North	Bill Casey; 2,488; 31.65%	David Wightman; 569; 7.24%	Lauren Skabar; 569; 7.24%			Elizabeth Smith-McCrossin; 4,235; 53.87%	Elizabeth Smith-McCrossin
Cumberland South	Rollie Lawless; 1,092; 19.17%	Tory Rushton; 3,900; 68.47%	Larry Duchesne; 524; 9.20%	Nicholas Hendren; 180; 3.16%			Tory Rushton
Hants East	Michael Blois; 3,239; 36.36%	John A. MacDonald; 3,328; 37.36%	Abby Cameron; 2,142; 24.05%	Simon Greenough; 199; 2.23%			Vacant
Truro-Bible Hill-Millbrook-Salmon River	Tamara Tynes Powell; 2,541; 30.21%	Dave Ritcey; 4,025; 47.85%	Darlene DeAdder; 1,398; 16.62%	Shaun Trainor; 448; 5.33%			Dave Ritcey

=== Central Halifax ===
Electoral district	Candidates						Incumbent
Electoral district	Liberal	PC	NDP	Green	Atlantica	Independent	Incumbent
Clayton Park West	Rafah DiCostanzo; 3,603; 47.60%	Nargis DeMolitor; 1,875; 24.77%	Reena Davis; 1,836; 24.25%	Richard Zurawski; 210; 2.77%	Helen Lau; 46; 0.61%		Rafah DiCostanzo
Fairview-Clayton Park	Patricia Arab; 2,892; 38.51%	Nicole Mosher; 1,678; 22.34%	Joanne Hussey; 2,787; 37.11%	Sheila Richardson; 153; 2.04%			Patricia Arab
Halifax Armdale	Ali Duale; 3,070; 40.35%	Richard MacLean; 1,681; 22.09%	Julie Melanson; 2,593; 34.08%	Jo-Ann Roberts; 202; 2.65%		Stephen Chafe; 63; 0.83%	Lena Diab†
Halifax Chebucto	Jackie Kinley; 2,478; 32.14%	John Wesley Chisholm; 911; 11.81%	**Gary Burrill**; 4,009; 51.99%	Lily Barraclough; 313; 4.06%			Gary Burrill
Halifax Citadel-Sable Island	Labi Kousoulis; 2,956; 36.82%	Sheri Morgan; 1,425; 17.75%	Lisa Lachance; 3,397; 42.31%	Noah Hollis; 250; 3.11%			Labi Kousoulis
Halifax Needham	Colin Coady; 2,617; 29.07%	Scott Ellis; 904; 10.04%	Suzy Hansen; 5,308; 58.96%	Kai Trappenberg; 173; 1.92%			Lisa Roberts†

=== Suburban Halifax ===
Electoral district	Candidates						Incumbent
Electoral district	Liberal	PC	NDP	Green	Atlantica	Independent	Incumbent
Bedford Basin	Kelly Regan; 3,700; 50.87%	Nick Driscoll; 1,874; 25.76%	Jacob Wilson; 1,554; 21.36%	Madeline Taylor; 146; 2.01%			Kelly Regan; Bedford
Bedford South	Braedon Clark; 3,568; 45.37%	Sura Hadad; 2,338; 29.73%	David Paterson; 1,763; 22.42%	Ron G. Parker; 140; 1.78%	Alan Nightingale; 55; 0.70%		New riding
Halifax Atlantic	Brendan Maguire; 4,213; 55.22%	Tim Cranston; 1,493; 19.57%	Shauna Hatt; 1,740; 22.81%	Sarah Weston; 183; 2.40%			Brendan Maguire
Hammonds Plains-Lucasville	Ben Jessome; 3,697; 46.06%	Julie Chaisson; 2,865; 35.70%	Angela Downey; 1,333; 16.61%	Mark Embrett; 131; 1.63%			Ben Jessome
Sackville-Cobequid	Mary LeRoy; 1,701; 21.51%	Steve Craig; 3,426; 43.33%	Lara Fawthrop; 2,577; 32.59%	Ian Dawson; 203; 2.57%			Steve Craig
Sackville-Uniacke	Donalda MacIsaac; 2,323; 32.80%	Brad Johns; 3,104; 43.82%	Thomas Hill; 1,535; 21.67%	Carson LeQuesne; 121; 1.71%			Brad Johns; Sackville-Beaver Bank
Timberlea-Prospect	**Iain Rankin**; 5,181; 54.38%	Bill Healy; 2,320; 24.35%	Raymond Theriault; 1,647; 17.29%	Harry Ward; 250; 2.62%	Dessire G. Miari; 40; 0.42%	Dawn Edith Penney; 90; 0.94%	Iain Rankin
Waverley-Fall River-Beaver Bank	Marni Tuttle; 3,546; 36.36%	Brian Wong; 3,938; 40.38%	Christina McCarron; 1,581; 16.21%	Anthony Edmonds; 617; 6.33%	Shawn Whitford; 71; 0.73%		Bill Horne†

=== Dartmouth/Cole Harbour/Eastern Shore ===
Electoral district	Candidates					Incumbent
Electoral district	Liberal	PC	NDP	Green	Atlantica	Incumbent
Cole Harbour	Tony Ince; 2,118; 39.75%	Darryl Johnson; 1,704; 31.98%	Jerome Lagmay; 1,431; 26.86%		Chris Kinnie; 75; 1.41%	Tony Ince; Cole Harbour-Portland Valley
Cole Harbour-Dartmouth	Lorelei Nicoll; 5,144; 52.24%	Karina Sanford; 2,929; 29.75%	Melody Pentland; 1,558; 15.82%	Rana Zaman; 215; 2.18%		New riding
Dartmouth East	D'Arcy Poultney; 2,900; 34.68%	Tim Halman; 3,260; 38.99%	Tyler J. Colbourne; 1,974; 23.61%	Sara Adams; 187; 2.24%	Chris Bowie; 41; 0.49%	Tim Halman
Dartmouth North	Pam Cooley; 2,361; 31.48%	Lisa Coates; 1,278; 17.04%	Susan Leblanc; 3,731; 49.75%	Carolyn Marshall; 129; 1.72%		Susan Leblanc
Dartmouth South	Lesley MacKay; 1,603; 22.14%	Chris Curtis; 1,262; 17.43%	Claudia Chender; 4,209; 58.13%	Skylar Martini; 167; 2.31%		Claudia Chender
Eastern Passage	Joyce Treen; 1,444; 26.21%	Barbara Adams; 2,469; 44.82%	Tammy Jakeman; 1,222; 22.18%	Corey Myers; 374; 6.79%		Barbara Adams; Cole Harbour-Eastern Passage
Eastern Shore	Kevin Murphy; 3,169; 34.06%	Kent Smith; 4,264; 45.82%	Deirdre Dwyer; 1,618; 17.39%	Cheryl Atkinson; 254; 2.73%		Kevin Murphy
Preston	Angela Simmonds; 2,226; 43.38%	Archy Beals; 1,472; 28.69%	Colter C.C. Simmonds; 1,433; 27.93%			Keith Colwell†; Preston-Dartmouth

=== Central Nova ===
Electoral district	Candidates						Incumbent
Electoral district	Liberal	PC	NDP	Green	Atlantica	Independent	Incumbent
Antigonish	Randy Delorey; 2,997; 31.82%	Michelle Thompson; 4,707; 49.98%	Moraig MacGillivray; 1,552; 16.48%	Will Fraser; 128; 1.36%	Ryan Smyth; 34; 0.36%		Randy Delorey
Guysborough-Tracadie	Lloyd Hines; 1,571; 30.35%	Greg Morrow; 3,281; 63.39%	Matt Stickland; 247; 4.77%	Gabe Bruce; 77; 1.49%			Lloyd Hines; Guysborough-Eastern Shore-Tracadie
Pictou Centre	Jim McKenna; 2,269; 30.93%	Pat Dunn; 4,092; 55.77%	Vernon Theriault; 862; 11.75%	Laura Moore; 114; 1.55%			Pat Dunn
Pictou East	Joe MacDonald; 1,585; 22.46%	**Tim Houston**; 4,918; 69.68%	Joy Polley; 500; 7.08%		**Jonathan Geoffrey Dean**; 55; 0.78%		Tim Houston
Pictou West	Mary Wooldridge-Elliott; 1,510; 21.41%	Karla MacFarlane; 4,487; 63.62%	Rick Parker; 872; 12.36%	Clare Brett; 124; 1.76%		John A. Clark; 60; 0.85%	Karla MacFarlane

=== Cape Breton ===
Electoral district	Candidates					Incumbent
Electoral district	Liberal	PC	NDP	Green	Independent	Incumbent
Cape Breton Centre-Whitney Pier	Michelle Wilson; 3,188; 40.61%	Bryden Mombourquette; 1,281; 16.32%	Kendra Coombes; 3,309; 42.15%	Robert Hussey; 72; 0.92%		Kendra Coombes; Cape Breton Centre
Cape Breton East	Heather Peters; 3,094; 36.73%	Brian Comer; 3,897; 46.27%	Barbara Beaton; 1,432; 17.00%			Brian Comer; Sydney River-Mira-Louisbourg
Glace Bay-Dominion	John John McCarthy; 2,479; 31.15%	John White; 2,754; 34.61%	John Morgan; 2,725; 34.24%			Geoff MacLellan†; Glace Bay
Inverness	Damian MacInnis; 3,112; 35.96%	Allan MacMaster; 4,833; 55.85%	Joanna Clark; 708; 8.18%			Allan MacMaster
Northside-Westmount	Fred Tilley; 4,030; 46.86%	Murray Ryan; 3,140; 36.51%	Jennifer Morrison; 1,430; 16.63%			Murray Ryan
Richmond	Matt Haley; 2,009; 36.85%	Trevor Boudreau; 2,773; 50.86%	Bryson Syliboy; 274; 5.03%		Alana Paon; 396; 7.26%	Alana Paon; Cape Breton-Richmond
Sydney-Membertou	Derek Mombourquette; 4,561; 54.27%	Pauline Singer; 1,467; 17.45%	Madonna Doucette; 2,377; 28.28%			Derek Mombourquette; Sydney-Whitney Pier
Victoria-The Lakes	Nadine Bernard; 2,224; 34.20%	Keith Bain; 3,536; 54.37%	Adrianna MacKinnon; 627; 9.64%		Stemer MacLeod; 116; 1.78%	Keith Bain

== Opinion polls ==
Voting intentions in Nova Scotia since the 2017 election

Polling Firm	Poll Published	Link	Liberal	PC	NDP	Green	Lead
Election Results	August 17, 2021	N/A	36.67	38.44	20.93	2.14	1.77
Forum Research	August 16, 2021	HTML	39	36	21	3	3
Mainstreet Research	August 16, 2021	HTML	38	36	21	3	2
Narrative Research	August 11, 2021	PDF	40	31	27	2	9
Leger	August 2, 2021	PDF	42	32	20	5	10
Mainstreet Research	July 22, 2021	HTML	42	30	22	4	12
Premier Iain Rankin calls an election to be held on August 17, 2021 (July 17, 2021)
Angus Reid	June 9, 2021	HTML	41	33	20	4	8
Narrative Research	June 3, 2021	HTML	52	24	19	5	28
Narrative Research	March 9, 2021	HTML	50	26	18	6	24
MQO Research	February 25, 2021	HTML	51	27	15	4	24
Iain Rankin is sworn in as Premier of Nova Scotia (February 23, 2021)
Iain Rankin is elected leader of the Liberal Party (February 6, 2021)
Angus Reid	December 10, 2020	HTML	37	29	25	7	8
Narrative Research	December 8, 2020	HTML	49	25	21	5	24
Narrative Research	September 3, 2020	HTML	47	27	19	6	20
Stephen McNeil announces his intention to resign as leader of the Liberal Party and Premier of Nova Scotia (August 6, 2020)
Angus Reid	June 8, 2020	HTML	42	31	19	7	11
Narrative Research	May 25, 2020	HTML	57	22	15	6	35
Innovative Research Group	May 12, 2020	PDF	49	24	18	9	25
Narrative Research	March 12, 2020	HTML	43	27	21	10	16
MQO Research	March 3, 2020	PDF	34	32	22	9	2
Narrative Research	December 10, 2019	HTML	42	26	21	9	16
MQO Research	August 31, 2019	PDF	35	35	20	8	Tie
Narrative Research	July 31–August 22, 2019	PDF	39	28	16	15	11
Narrative Research	June 13, 2019	HTML	31	33	21	13	2
MQO Research	May 13, 2019	PDF	30	38	18	12	8
Corporate Research Associates	March 6, 2019	PDF	37	34	24	5	3
MQO Research	February 13, 2019	PDF	41	33	19	7	8
Mainstreet Research	January 30, 2019	HTML	32.1	31.0	25.2	8.1	1.1
Corporate Research Associates	December 12, 2018	PDF	38	31	24	6	7
Mainstreet Research	November 16, 2018	HTML	32.7	33.2	20.7	8.9	0.5
MQO Research	November 8, 2018	PDF	42	36	15	6	6
Tim Houston is elected leader of the Progressive Conservative Party (October 27, 2018)
Corporate Research Associates	September 6, 2018	PDF	43	32	21	4	11
MQO Research	August 9, 2018	PDF	45	31	20	4	14
Mainstreet Research	July 17, 2018	HTML	36.7	33.8	22.9	5	2.9
Corporate Research Associates	June 6, 2018	PDF	45	29	23	3	16
MQO Research	May 11, 2018	PDF	40	31	23	4	9
Mainstreet Research	April 18, 2018	HTML	40.2	34.7	17.3	5.6	5.5
Corporate Research Associates	March 8, 2018	PDF	37	34	25	4	3
Mainstreet Research	January 25, 2018	HTML	40.6	38.5	15.7	5.2	2.1
MQO Research	January 24, 2018	PDF	47	30	17	5	17
Corporate Research Associates	December 6, 2017	PDF	38	29	27	5	9
MQO Research	October 24, 2017	PDF	44	32	19	4	12
Corporate Research Associates	September 13, 2017	PDF	45	29	22	4	16
MQO Research	July 27, 2017	PDF	46	30	21	3	16
Corporate Research Associates	June 7, 2017	PDF	40	29	28	2	11
Election 2017	May 30, 2017	HTML	39.5	35.7	21.5	2.8	3.8
