= Brian Young (politician) =

Canadian politician

The Honourable Brian A. Young ECNS

MLA for Cape Breton North
- In office 1981–1993
- Preceded by: Len J. Arsenault
- Succeeded by: Ron Stewart

Personal details
- Born: September 29, 1949 (age 76) North Sydney, Nova Scotia
- Party: Progressive Conservative

Brian Alexander Young (born September 29, 1949) is a former politician in Nova Scotia, Canada. He represented Cape Breton North in the Nova Scotia House of Assembly from 1981 to 1993 as a Progressive Conservative member.

He was born in North Sydney, Nova Scotia, the son of James R. Young and Julia Therese Young, and educated at St. Francis Xavier University and Dalhousie University. He married Nancy Ann Wilkie in 1975. Young is president of Young's Topex Limited, which produces speciality steel products. Young established a foundation to promote organ donation which is named after his daughter Carmen, who died in 1992 after undergoing a double lung transplant.

Young served on the town council for North Sydney from 1980 to 1981. He entered provincial politics in the 1981 election, defeating New Democrat incumbent Len J. Arsenault in the Cape Breton North riding. He was re-elected in the 1984 election. On November 26, 1985, Young was appointed to the Executive Council of Nova Scotia as Minister of Labour. In November 1987, Young was moved to Minister of Tourism and Culture. Young was re-elected in the 1988 election, becoming the only Progressive Conservative elected from Cape Breton. In December 1988, Young became Minister of Municipal Affairs. He was defeated by Liberal Ron Stewart in the 1993 election.
