= Tom MacKeough =

Canadian politician

Thomas James McKeough
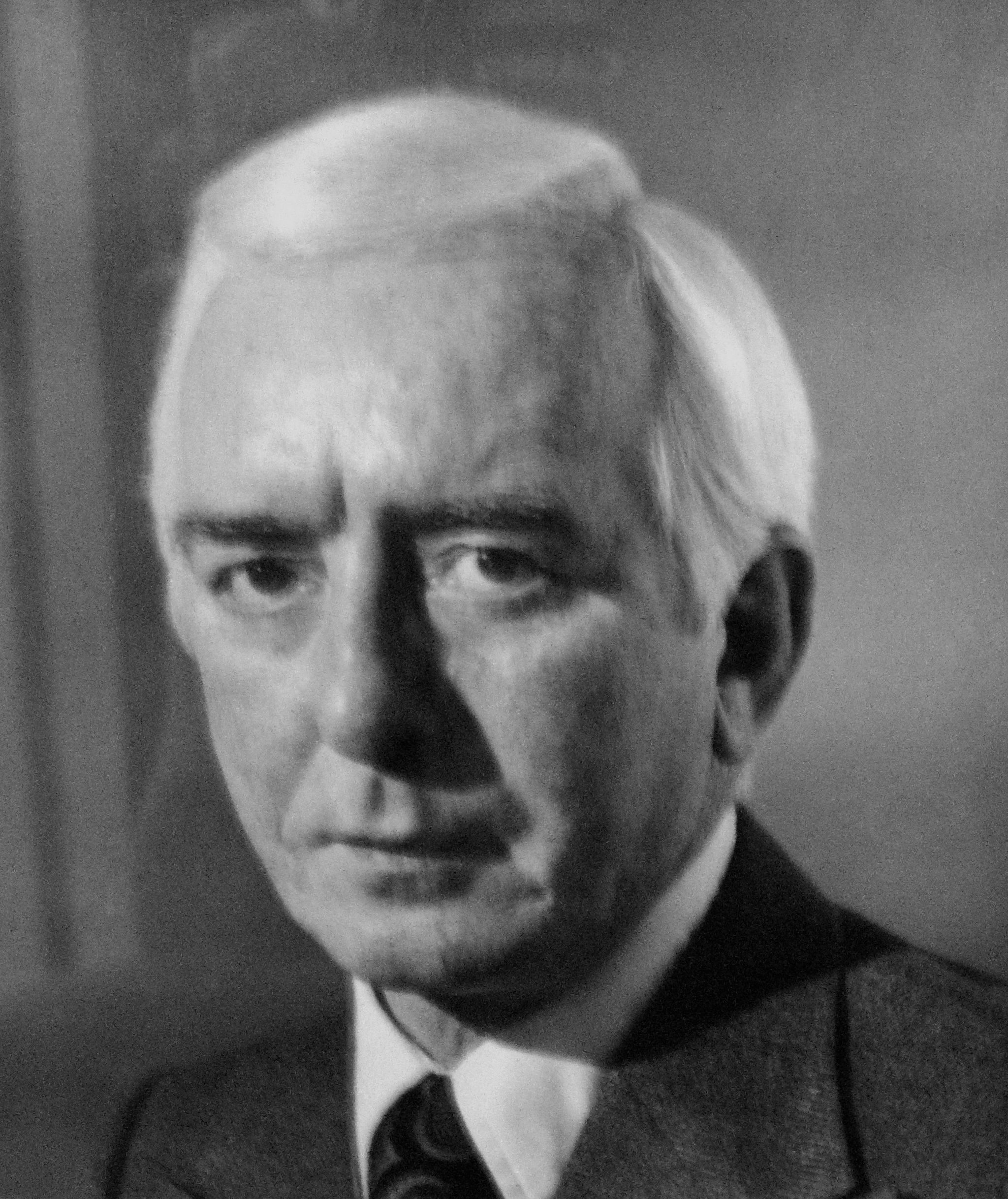
- MacKeough, c. 1973

MLA for Cape Breton North
- In office 1960–1978
- Preceded by: John Michael Macdonald
- Succeeded by: Len J. Arsenault

Personal details
- Born: October 12, 1922 Sydney, Nova Scotia
- Died: January 2, 1990 (aged 67)
- Party: Progressive Conservative
- Spouse: Marie-Paule Mantha

Thomas James MacKeough (October 12, 1922 – January 2, 1990) was a Canadian politician, who represented the electoral district of Cape Breton North in the Nova Scotia House of Assembly from 1960 to 1978. He was a member of the Progressive Conservatives. McKeough served in the Executive Council of Nova Scotia as Minister of Municipal Affairs, Minister of Labour, Minister of Trade and Industry, and Minister of Finance. He played a major role in reshaping EMS in Nova Scotia. Following his retirement from politics, McKeough chaired a Provincial Task Force on Occupation Health and Safety in the workplace.

== Early life and education ==
Tom MacKeough was born on October 12, 1922 in Sydney, Nova Scotia. He was the son of James and Mary McKeough, who were Irish immigrants.He attended St. Joseph’s School and Sydney Academy, where he excelled in academics and sports.He graduated from St. Francis Xavier University in 1943 with a Bachelor of Arts degree, and then from Dalhousie University in 1946 with a Doctor of Medicine degree. Before entering politics, he practiced medicine in Sydney Mines and North Sydney for several years. He married Marie-Paule Mantha, a nurse from Quebec, in 1950 and they had six children.

== Involvement in Nova Scotia EMS ==
Tom MacKeough was instrumental in improving the ambulance services in Nova Scotia in the late 1960s and early 1970s when he was the Minister of Municipal Affairs. At that time, most of the ambulance services were based out of funeral homes and lacked adequate funding and standards. In 1968, eight funeral homes decided to stop providing ambulance services to their communities, which prompted the formation of the Ambulance Operators Association of Nova Scotia (AOANS), representing the private ambulance company owners. The AOANS presented two requests to the provincial government: to take over the ambulance services with the assistance of the ambulance company owners or to provide financial support to upgrade the existing services. Then-health minister Richard Donahoe rejected both requests, but MacKeough agreed that something had to be done. He provided a $300,000 subsidy to the AOANS, which was used to improve the quality and availability of ambulance services. He also supported the development of a training program and an inspection program for ambulance personnel and vehicles. He played a major role in reshaping EMS in Nova Scotia, laying the foundation for a more professional and integrated system.

== Later life and death ==
After retiring from politics in 1978, Tom MacKeough chaired a Provincial Task Force on Occupation Health and Safety in the Workplace, which issued a report in 1984 with recommendations to improve Nova Scotian workers' working conditions and health standards. He also remained active in his community, serving as a Cape Breton Development Corporation director and the Cape Breton Regional Hospital Foundation. He suffered from diabetes and heart problems in his later years and underwent quadruple bypass surgery in 1989. He died on January 2, 1990, at the age of 67, from complications of diabetes. His wife, Marie-Paule, and his six children survived him. He was buried at Holy Cross Cemetery in North Sydney. He was remembered as a dedicated public servant, a visionary leader, and a compassionate physician.
