= Ron Stewart (Canadian politician) =

Canadian physician and politician (1942–2024)

The Honourable Ron Stewart CC ECNS ONS
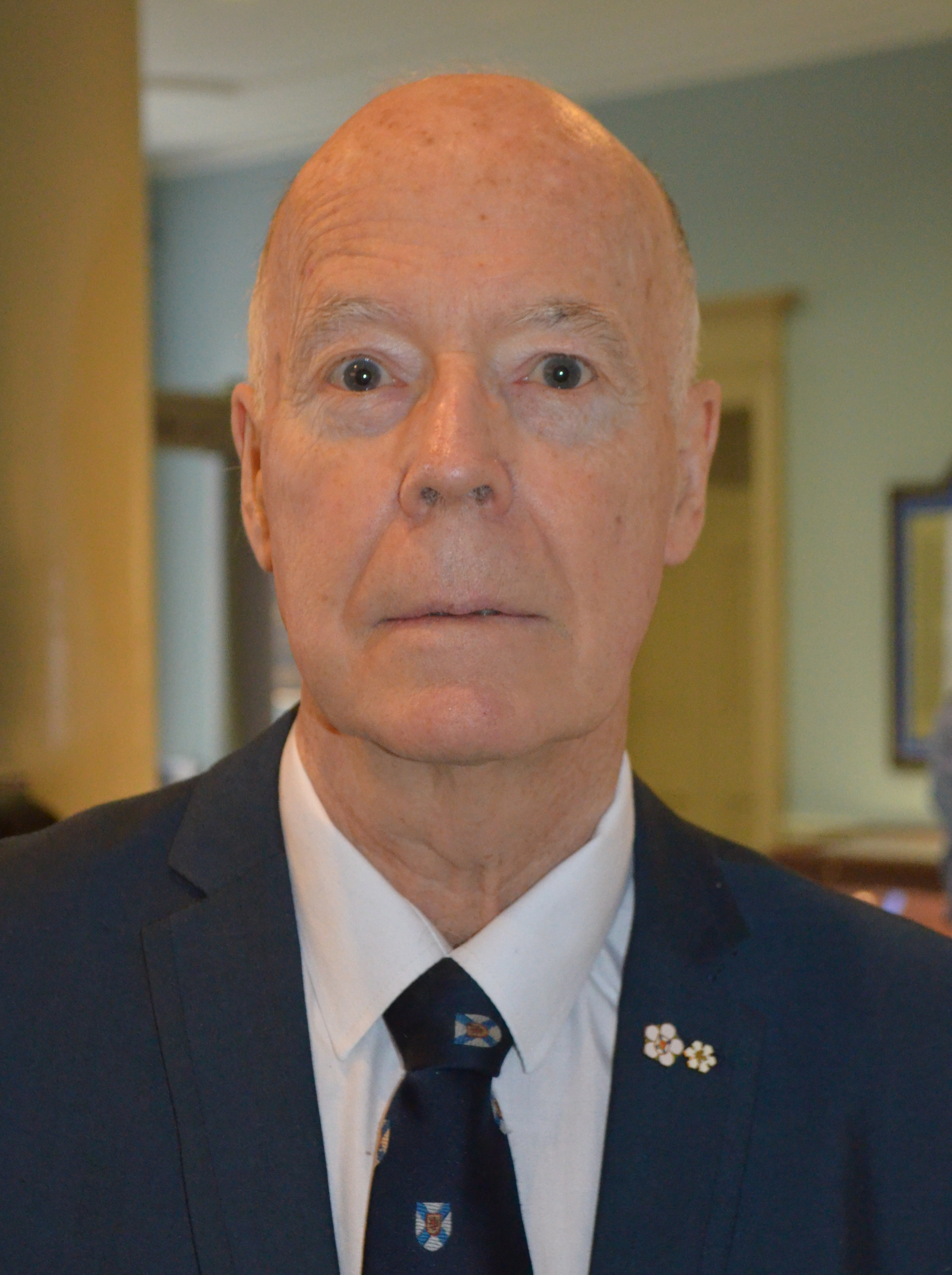
- Stewart in 2015

MLA for Cape Breton North
- In office 1993 – September 15, 1997
- Preceded by: Brian Young
- Succeeded by: Russell MacLellan

Minister of Health
- In office June 11, 1993 – June 27, 1996
- Preceded by: George Moody
- Succeeded by: Bernie Boudreau

Personal details
- Born: October 11, 1942 North Sydney, Nova Scotia, Canada
- Died: October 21, 2024 (aged 82)
- Party: Liberal
- Occupation: Physician, professor

Ronald Daniel Stewart CC ONS (October 11, 1942 – October 21, 2024) was a Canadian medical doctor and politician. He represented the electoral district of Cape Breton North in the Nova Scotia House of Assembly from 1993 to 1997. He was a member of the Nova Scotia Liberal Party. He played a role in the professionalization of emergency medicine in the latter half of the 20th century, being named a "Hero of Emergency Medicine" in 2008.

== Early life and education ==
Stewart was born in North Sydney, Nova Scotia, to father Donald and mother Edith, and raised in Sydney Mines. He graduated with his BA and BSc from Acadia University, and from Dalhousie University in 1970 with his medical degree. During his time as an intern at the VG Hospital he was heavily influenced by his professor and head of Emergency Medicine Dr. Bob Scharf. Upon graduation, he began his medical career by taking up a rural practice in Neil's Harbour, Nova Scotia.

== Medical career ==
In 1972, after two years in Cape Breton, Stewart entered the residency program in Emergency Medicine at the University of Southern California. He was the first medical director in the Los Angeles paramedic program. In Los Angeles, Stewart treated patients like Charles Manson. While working in Los Angeles he was also hired as a consultant for the television shows Emergency! and Marcus Welby, M.D..

In 1978, he left California for Pennsylvania, where he served as the founding head of the emergency medicine department at the University of Pittsburgh. He was appointed medical director for the Department of Public Safety of Pittsburgh, where he was known as "Doctor Emergency".

In 1988, Stewart returned to Canada, first to the University of Toronto and then to Dalhousie University in Halifax, Nova Scotia, to teach and establish a pain and trauma research lab.

Stewart served as the chairman for study of health reform in United States, which advised Bill Clinton, that looked at one phase of ambulatory care and the training standards with regards to emergency care. In 2008, the American College of Emergency Physicians named Stewart a "Hero Emergency Medicine." Stewart is considered "a remarkable pioneer in the field of Emergency Medicine and EMS," for which he credited his "island-bound" upbringing and sense of community.

== Political career ==
Stewart entered provincial politics in the 1993 election, defeating Progressive Conservative cabinet minister Brian Young by over 1500 votes in the Cape Breton North riding. In June 1993, Stewart was appointed to the Executive Council of Nova Scotia as Minister of Health.

Stewart commissioned several reports on health care reform. Based on these reports, a reform of Nova Scotia's health care system was started in 1994, with the provincial government taking over control of ground ambulance operations and consolidating them into a single entity called Emergency Health Services.

Stewart resigned from cabinet on June 27, 1996, and was replaced by Bernie Boudreau. On September 15, 1997, Stewart resigned as MLA, opening up a seat for premier Russell MacLellan to run in a byelection.

== After politics ==
Stewart founded the Music-in-Medicine program at Dalhousie Medical School, which is part of their Medical Humanities Program. Stewart later served as the Honorary Colonel of 35 (Sydney) Field Ambulance.

Stewart died from cancer in October 2024, at the age of 82.

== Awards and honours ==
In 1993, Stewart was named an Officer of the Order of Canada. In 2006, he was named a Member of the Order of Nova Scotia. In 2023 he was promoted to Companion of the Order of Canada. In 2008, Stewart was named a Hero of Emergency Medicine by the American College of Emergency Physicians. Stewart has also received honorary doctorates from Acadia University (DSc-1989), Cape Breton University (LLD-2010) and Dalhousie University (2017).
