= Eastern Passage (electoral district) =

Provincial electoral district in Nova Scotia, Canada

Nova Scotia electoral district

Provincial electoral district
- Legislature: Nova Scotia House of Assembly
MLA
Barbara Adams
Progressive Conservative
- District created: 2019
- First contested: 2024

Demographics
- Electors: 10,512
- Area (km²): 42
- Census division: Halifax Regional Municipality
- Census subdivision: Halifax Regional Municipality

Eastern Passage is a provincial electoral district of Nova Scotia, Canada, that came into effect at the 2021 Nova Scotia general election. It elects one member to the Legislative Assembly of Nova Scotia.

The riding was created by the 2019 provincial redistribution out of part of Cole Harbour-Eastern Passage.

The riding contains the communities of Cow Bay, Eastern Passage, Shearwater, McNabs Island, and the Dartmouth neighbourhood of Imperoyal in the Halifax Regional Municipality.

== Members of the Legislative Assembly ==
This riding has elected the following MLAs:

Eastern Passage
Legislature	Years	Member	Party
Riding created from Cole Harbour-Eastern Passage
64th	2021–2024	Barbara Adams	Progressive Conservative
65th	2024–present	Barbara Adams	Progressive Conservative

== Election results ==
2024 Nova Scotia general election
Party	Candidate	Votes	%	±%
Progressive Conservative	Barbara Adams	2,754	63.75	18.93
Liberal	Chris Peters	1,110	25.69	-0.52
Independent	Tammy Jakeman	456	10.56	–
Total		4,320	–	
Total rejected ballots		85		
Turnout		4,408	40.82	
Eligible voters		10,798		
Progressive Conservative hold		Swing		
Source: Elections Nova Scotia

2021 Nova Scotia general election
Party	Candidate	Votes	%	±%	Expenditures
Progressive Conservative	Barbara Adams	2,469	44.82	+9.11	$29,475.98
Liberal	Joyce Treen	1,444	26.21	-8.60	$45,473.02
New Democratic	Tammy Jakeman	1,222	22.18	-2.56	$24,550.06
Green	Corey Myers	374	6.79	+1.95	$2,771.86
Total valid votes/expense limit		5,509	99.53	–	$64,783.35
Total rejected ballots		26	0.47		
Turnout		5,535	52.65		
Eligible voters		10,512			
Progressive Conservative notional hold		Swing		+8.86	
Source: Elections Nova Scotia

2017 provincial election redistributed results
Party	Vote	%
Progressive Conservative	2,182	35.71
Liberal	2,121	34.81
New Democratic	1,512	24.74
Green	296	4.84

== See also ==
- List of Nova Scotia provincial electoral districts
- Canadian provincial electoral districts
