= Len J. Arsenault =

Canadian politician (1934–1999)

MLA for Cape Breton North
- In office 1978–1981
- Preceded by: Tom McKeough
- Succeeded by: Brian Young

Personal details
- Born: March 24, 1934 New Waterford, Nova Scotia
- Died: February 21, 1999 (aged 64) Glace Bay, Nova Scotia
- Party: Nova Scotia New Democratic Party
- Occupation: teacher

Linus Joseph "Len" Arsenault (March 24, 1934 – February 21, 1999) was a Canadian politician. He represented the electoral district of Cape Breton North in the Nova Scotia House of Assembly from 1978 to 1981. He was a member of the Nova Scotia New Democratic Party.

== Biography ==
Arsenault was born in New Waterford, Nova Scotia. He attended St. Francis Xavier University and was a teacher in Alberta and Nova Scotia. In 1980, Arsenault was a candidate for the leadership of the NDP, finishing second to Alexa McDonough. Arsenault died on February 21, 1999.
