= Danielle Barkhouse =

Canadian politician

Danielle S. Barkhouse MLA

Speaker of the House of Assembly of Nova Scotia
- Incumbent
- Assumed office September 5, 2024
- Preceded by: Karla MacFarlane

Member of the Nova Scotia House of Assembly for Chester-St. Margaret's
- Incumbent
- Assumed office August 17, 2021
- Preceded by: Hugh MacKay

Personal details
- Born: 1976 (age 49–50) New Brunswick, Canada
- Party: Progressive Conservative
- Occupation: Politician

Danielle S. Barkhouse (born 1976) is a Canadian politician who was elected to the Nova Scotia House of Assembly in 2021. She represents the riding of Chester-St. Margaret's as a member of the Progressive Conservative Association of Nova Scotia. Currently, Barkhouse is the Speaker of the Nova Scotia House of Assembly. She is a member of the Assembly Matters and Veterans Affairs Committees. She is also a member of the House of Assembly Management Commission.

Prior to her election to the legislature, Barkhouse was a municipal councillor in Chester.

== Electoral history ==
2024 Nova Scotia general election: Chester-St. Margaret's
Party	Candidate	Votes	%	±%
Progressive Conservative	Danielle Barkhouse	4,806	58.21	+18.15
Liberal	Laura Mulrooney	2,160	26.16	-11.45
New Democratic	Brendan Mosher	1,290	15.63	-1.57
Total		8,256	–	
Total rejected / declined ballots		62	2	
Turnout		8,320	50.36	
Eligible voters		16,521		
Progressive Conservative hold		Swing		
Source: Elections Nova Scotia

2021 Nova Scotia general election: Chester-St. Margaret's
Party	Candidate	Votes	%	±%	Expenditures
Progressive Conservative	Danielle Barkhouse	3,788	40.06	+14.40	$76,695.05
Liberal	Jacob Killawee	3,556	37.61	+2.38	$67,872.46
New Democratic	Amy Reitsma	1,626	17.20	-17.23	$50,011.78
Green	Jessica Alexander	417	4.41	-0.27	$10,917.97
Atlantica	Steven Foster	68	0.72	–	$200.00
Total valid votes/expense limit		9,455	99.62	-0.17	$88,319.62
Total rejected ballots		36	0.38	+0.17	
Turnout		9,491	62.48	+4.88	
Eligible voters		15,191			
Progressive Conservative gain from Liberal		Swing		+6.01	
Source: Elections Nova Scotia

2020 Chester Municipal Election District 3
Party	Candidate	Votes	Percent	
No Affiliation	Danielle Barkhouse	623	81.65%	✓
No Affiliation	Kerry Keddy	140	18.35%	

2016 Chester Municipal Election District 3
Party	Candidate	Votes	Percent	
No Affiliation	Danielle Barkhouse	326	63.18%	✓
No Affiliation	Brenda Mulrooney	190	36.82%	

== As Speaker ==
As Speaker of the House, Danielle Barkhouse has limited public access to the House of Assembly and indicated "an investigation is ongoing" to identify participants in a non-violent demonstration for a ban on entering Province House.

== Controversies ==
Danielle Barkhouse was caught on camera in 2022, during a vote, doing a middle finger gesture to MLA Brendan Maguire (who was then a Liberal MLA).
