= Northside-Westmount =

Provincial electoral district in Nova Scotia, Canada

Nova Scotia electoral district

Provincial electoral district
- Legislature: Nova Scotia House of Assembly
MLA
Fred Tilley
Progressive Conservative
- District created: 1933
- Last contested: 2024

Demographics
- Electors: 15,952
- Area (km²): 80
- Census division: Cape Breton County
- Census subdivision: Cape Breton Regional Municipality

Northside-Westmount is a provincial electoral district in Nova Scotia, Canada, that elects one member of the Nova Scotia House of Assembly.

In 1933, the County of Cape Breton was divided into five electoral districts, one of which was Cape Breton North, which was carved out of parts of Cape Breton Centre and Cape Breton East. In 2003, the district gained upper North Sydney as far as Balls Creek and Point Aconi. In 2013, the district was renamed Northside-Westmount and it lost the area west of Little Bras d'Or to Victoria-The Lakes and gained the area north of Highway 125 from Cape Breton South.

In the 2021 election, Northside-Westmount was the only riding to flip to the Liberals as the province went from a Liberal majority to a Progressive Conservative majority.

== Members of the Legislative Assembly ==
This riding has elected the following members of the Legislative Assembly:

Northside-Westmount
Legislature	Years	Member	Party
Cape Breton North created from Cape Breton County (1867–1933)
40th	1933–1937	Joseph Macdonald	Liberal-Conservative
41st	1937–1941	George Belcher Murray	Liberal
42nd	1941–1945	Alexander O'Handley	Liberal
43rd	1945–1949	Alexander O'Handley	Liberal
44th	1949–1953	Alexander O'Handley	Liberal
45th	1953–1956	Alexander O'Handley	Liberal
46th	1956–1960	John Michael Macdonald	Progressive Conservative
47th	1960–1963	Tom MacKeough	Progressive Conservative
48th	1963–1967	Tom MacKeough	Progressive Conservative
49th	1967–1970	Tom MacKeough	Progressive Conservative
50th	1970–1974	Tom MacKeough	Progressive Conservative
51st	1974–1978	Tom MacKeough	Progressive Conservative
52nd	1978–1981	Len J. Arsenault	New Democratic
53rd	1981–1984	Brian Young	Progressive Conservative
54th	1984–1988	Brian Young	Progressive Conservative
55th	1988–1993	Brian Young	Progressive Conservative
56th	1993–1997	Ron Stewart	Liberal
56th	1997–1998	Russell MacLellan	Liberal
57th	1998–1999	Russell MacLellan	Liberal
58th	1999–2001	Russell MacLellan	Liberal
58th	2001–2003	Cecil Clarke	Progressive Conservative
59th	2003–2006	Cecil Clarke	Progressive Conservative
60th	2006–2009	Cecil Clarke	Progressive Conservative
61st	2009–2011	Cecil Clarke	Progressive Conservative
61st	2011–2013	Eddie Orrell	Progressive Conservative
Northside-Westmount
62nd	2013–2017	Eddie Orrell	Progressive Conservative
63rd	2017–2019	Eddie Orrell	Progressive Conservative
63rd	2019–2021	Murray Ryan	Progressive Conservative
64th	2021–2024	Fred Tilley	Liberal
64th	2024–2024	Fred Tilley	Progressive Conservative
65th	2024–present	Fred Tilley	Progressive Conservative

== Election results ==
=== Northside–Westmount ===
2024 Nova Scotia general election
Party	Candidate	Votes	%	±%
Progressive Conservative	Fred Tilley	4,978	67.89	+31.38
Liberal	Danny Laffin	1,675	22.85	-24.02
New Democratic	Katelyn Armstrong	679	9.26	-7.37
Total valid votes		7,332		
Total rejected ballots		46		
Turnout		7,379	45.05	
Eligible voters		16,381		
Progressive Conservative gain		Swing		
Source: Elections Nova Scotia

2021 Nova Scotia general election
Party	Candidate	Votes	%	±%	Expenditures
Liberal	Fred Tilley	4,030	46.86	+25.49	$58,368.38
Progressive Conservative	Murray Ryan	3,140	36.51	+7.55	$53,551.86
New Democratic	Jennifer Morrison	1,430	16.63	-0.37	$27,142.17
Total valid votes/expense limit		8,600	99.20	–	$93,147.57
Total rejected ballots		69	0.80	+0.14	
Turnout		8,669	53.04	+3.04	
Eligible voters		16,345			
Liberal gain from Progressive Conservative		Swing		+8.97	
Source: Elections Nova Scotia

Nova Scotia provincial by-election, September 3, 2019 Upon the resignation of Eddie Orrell
Party	Candidate	Votes	%	±%
Progressive Conservative	Murray Ryan	2,243	28.96	-34.49
Liberal	Paul Ratchford	1,655	21.37	+0.17
Independent	Danny Laffin	1,465	18.92	
New Democratic	Ronald Crowther	1,316	16.99	+1.66
Independent	Andrew Doyle	834	10.77	
Green	Ron G. Parker	203	2.62	
Atlantica	Thomas Bethell	28	0.36	
Total valid votes		7,744	99.35	
Total rejected ballots		51	0.65	-0.25
Turnout		7,795	48.87	-7.76
Eligible voters		15,952		
Progressive Conservative hold		Swing		-17.33

2017 Nova Scotia general election
Party	Candidate	Votes	%	±%
Progressive Conservative	Eddie Orrell	5,941	63.46	+19.43
Liberal	John Higgins	1,985	21.20	-17.95
New Democratic	Ronald Crowther	1,436	15.34	-1.48
Total valid votes		9,362	99.13	–
Total rejected ballots		82	0.87	–
Turnout		9,444	56.62	-2.23
Eligible voters		16,679		
Progressive Conservative hold		Swing		+18.69
Source: Elections Nova Scotia

2013 Nova Scotia general election
Party	Candidate	Votes	%	±%
Progressive Conservative	Eddie Orrell	4,179	44.03	-10.85
Liberal	John Higgins	3,716	39.15	+26.30
New Democratic	Cecil Snow	1,597	16.82	-14.45
Total valid votes		9,492	99.18	–
Total rejected ballots		78	0.82	–
Turnout		9,570	58.85	+7.14
Eligible voters		16,261		
Progressive Conservative notional hold		Swing		-18.58
Source: Elections Nova Scotia

=== 2011 ===
Nova Scotia provincial by-election, 2011-06-21: Cape Breton North
Party	Candidate	Votes	%	±%
Progressive Conservative	Eddie Orrell	3,975	54.88%	10.41%
New Democratic	Russell MacDonald	2,265	31.27%	-11.09%
Liberal	Brian Joseph McGean	931	12.85%	1.07%
Atlantica	Jonathan G. Dean	72	0.99%	–
Total valid votes		7,243	99.23	–
Total rejected ballots		56	0.77	–
Turnout		7,299	51.71	-2.91
Eligible voters		14,114		
Progressive Conservative hold		Swing		+10.75
Source(s) Source: Nova Scotia Legislature (2024). "Electoral History for Cape Breton North" (PDF). nslegislature.ca.

=== 2009 ===
2009 Nova Scotia general election: Cape Breton North
Party	Candidate	Votes	%	±%
Progressive Conservative	Cecil Clarke	3,477	44.47%	-6.10%
New Democratic	Russell Macdonald	3,312	42.36%	16.46%
Liberal	Ken Jardine	921	11.78%	-10.27%
Green	Chris Milburn	108	1.38%	-0.09%
Total valid votes		7,818	99.42	–
Total rejected ballots		0.58	–	
Turnout		7,864	54.62	-6.05
Eligible voters		14,397		
Progressive Conservative hold		Swing		-11.39
Source(s) Source: Nova Scotia Legislature (2024). "Electoral History for Cape Breton North" (PDF). nslegislature.ca.

=== 2006 ===
2006 Nova Scotia general election: Cape Breton North
Party	Candidate	Votes	%	±%
Progressive Conservative	Cecil Clarke	4,285	50.57%	7.11%
New Democratic	Russell Macdonald	2,195	25.91%	6.06%
Liberal	Fred Tilley	1,868	22.05%	-14.64%
Green	Mark Doucet	125	1.48%	–
Total valid votes		8,499	99.53	–
Total rejected ballots		40	0.47	–
Turnout		8,539	60.67	-4.88
Eligible voters		14,075		
Progressive Conservative hold		Swing		+6.61
Source(s) Source: Nova Scotia Legislature (2024). "Electoral History for Cape Breton North" (PDF). nslegislature.ca.

=== 2003 ===
2003 Nova Scotia general election: Cape Breton North
Party	Candidate	Votes	%	±%
Progressive Conservative	Cecil Clarke	3,754	43.46%	5.25%
Liberal	Mike White	3,169	36.69%	4.21%
New Democratic	Cecil Snow	1,714	19.84%	-9.46%
Total valid votes		8,637	99.15	–
Total rejected ballots		0.85	–	
Turnout		8,711	65.55	-2.39
Eligible voters		13,288		
Progressive Conservative hold		Swing		+4.73
Source(s) Source: Nova Scotia Legislature (2024). "Electoral History for Cape Breton North" (PDF). nslegislature.ca.

=== 2001 ===
Nova Scotia provincial by-election, March 6, 2001 upon the resignation of Russell MacLellan
Party	Candidate	Votes	%	±%
Progressive Conservative	Cecil Clarke	3,024	38.22%	16.73%
Liberal	Wes Stubbert	2,570	32.48%	-16.21%
New Democratic	Helen MacDonald	2,319	29.31%	-0.53%
Total valid votes		7,913	99.48	–
Total rejected ballots		41	0.52	–
Turnout		7,954	67.94	-5.63
Eligible voters		11,708		
Progressive Conservative gain from Liberal		Swing		+16.48
Source(s) Source: Nova Scotia Legislature (2024). "Electoral History for Cape Breton North" (PDF). nslegislature.ca.

=== 1999 ===
1999 Nova Scotia general election: Cape Breton North
Party	Candidate	Votes	%	±%
Liberal	Russell MacLellan	4,222	48.69%	-1.44%
New Democratic	Archie MacKinnon	2,587	29.83%	-0.13%
Progressive Conservative	Murray Johnston	1,863	21.48%	1.58%
Total valid votes		8,672	98.93	–
Total rejected ballots		94	1.07	–
Turnout		8,766	73.57	-2.31
Eligible voters		11,916		
Liberal hold		Swing		-0.79
Source(s) Source: Nova Scotia Legislature (2024). "Electoral History for Cape Breton North" (PDF). nslegislature.ca. Nova Scotia, Chief Electoral Officer (1999). Returns of the General Election for the House of Assembly, Thirty-Fifth General Election (Report). Elections Nova Scotia.

=== 1998 ===
1998 Nova Scotia general election: Cape Breton North
Party	Candidate	Votes	%	±%
Liberal	Russell MacLellan	4,666	50.13%	-6.84%
New Democratic	Archie MacKinnon	2,789	29.96%	-4.11%
Progressive Conservative	Murray Johnston	1,853	19.91%	10.95%
Total valid votes		9,308	99.27	–
Total rejected ballots		68	0.73	–
Turnout		9,376	75.88	+5.91
Eligible voters		12,357		
Liberal hold		Swing		-5.48
Source(s) Source: Nova Scotia Legislature (2024). "Electoral History for Cape Breton North" (PDF). nslegislature.ca.

=== 1997 ===
Nova Scotia provincial by-election, November 4, 1997: Cape Breton North upon the resignation of Ron Stewart
Party	Candidate	Votes	%	±%
Liberal	Russell MacLellan	4,826	56.97%	6.12%
New Democratic	Archie MacKinnon	2,886	34.07%	22.06%
Progressive Conservative	Danny Laffin	759	8.96%	-27.47%
Total valid votes		8,471	99.40	–
Total rejected ballots		51	0.60	–
Turnout		8,522	69.97	-14.79
Eligible voters		12,179		
Liberal hold		Swing		+14.09
Source(s) Source: Nova Scotia Legislature (2024). "Electoral History for Cape Breton North" (PDF). nslegislature.ca.By-Election Returns 1997 (PDF) (Report). Elections Nova Scotia. 1997. Archived from the original (PDF) on 7 August 2021.

=== 1993 ===
1993 Nova Scotia general election: Cape Breton North
Party	Candidate	Votes	%	±%
Liberal	Ron Stewart	5,459	50.85%	30.26%
Progressive Conservative	Brian Young	3,911	36.43%	-24.25%
New Democratic	Archie MacKinnon	1,289	12.01%	-6.73%
Independent	Ron Laffin	76	0.71%	–
Total valid votes		10,735	99.42	–
Total rejected ballots		63	0.58	–
Turnout		10,798	84.76	+7.93
Eligible voters		12,740		
Liberal gain from Progressive Conservative		Swing		+27.26
Source(s) Source: Nova Scotia Legislature (2024). "Electoral History for Cape Breton North" (PDF). nslegislature.ca. Nova Scotia, Chief Electoral Officer (1993). Returns of the General Election for the House of Assembly, Thirty-Third General Election (PDF) (Report). Queen's Printer. Archived from the original (PDF) on 18 June 2018.

=== 1988 ===
1988 Nova Scotia general election: Cape Breton North
Party	Candidate	Votes	%	±%
Progressive Conservative	Brian Young	6,018	60.68%	-9.33%
Liberal	Robert E. McGrath	2,042	20.59%	2.77%
New Democratic	Gerald Yetman	1,858	18.73%	11.02%
Total valid votes		9,918	99.33	–
Total rejected ballots		67	0.67	–
Turnout		9,985	76.83	+7.12
Eligible voters		12,996		
Progressive Conservative hold		Swing		-6.05
Source(s) Source: Nova Scotia Legislature (2024). "Electoral History for Cape Breton North" (PDF). nslegislature.ca. Nova Scotia, Chief Electoral Officer (1988). Returns of the General Election for the House of Assembly, Thirty-Second General Election (PDF) (Report). Queen's Printer. Archived from the original (PDF) on 7 July 2018.

=== 1984 ===
1984 Nova Scotia general election: Cape Breton North
Party	Candidate	Votes	%	±%
Progressive Conservative	Brian Young	6,431	70.01%	26.49%
Liberal	Hank Lamond	1,637	17.82%	-14.69%
New Democratic	Tom Rose	709	7.72%	-16.26%
Labour	M. J. (Molly) Julian	409	4.45%	–
Total valid votes		9,186	99.58	–
Total rejected ballots		39	0.42	–
Turnout		9,225	69.71	-5.85
Eligible voters		13,234		
Progressive Conservative hold		Swing		+20.59
Source(s) Source: Nova Scotia Legislature (2024). "Electoral History for Cape Breton North" (PDF). nslegislature.ca. Nova Scotia, Chief Electoral Officer (1984). Returns of the General Election for the House of Assembly, Thirty-First General Election (PDF) (Report). Queen's Printer. Archived from the original (PDF) on 31 July 2017.

=== 1981 ===
1981 Nova Scotia general election: Cape Breton North
Party	Candidate	Votes	%	±%
Progressive Conservative	Brian Young	4,187	43.51%	10.96%
Liberal	Nash Brogan	3,128	32.51%	4.34%
New Democratic	Len J. Arsenault	2,307	23.98%	-15.29%
Total valid votes		9,622	99.28	–
Total rejected ballots		70	0.72	–
Turnout		9,692	75.56	-4.20
Eligible voters		12,826		
Progressive Conservative gain from New Democratic		Swing		+7.64
Source(s) Source: Nova Scotia Legislature (2024). "Electoral History for Cape Breton North" (PDF). nslegislature.ca. Nova Scotia, Chief Electoral Officer (1981). Returns of the General Election for the House of Assembly, Thirtieth General Election (PDF) (Report). Queen's Printer. Archived from the original (PDF) on 31 July 2017.

=== 1978 ===
1978 Nova Scotia general election: Cape Breton North
Party	Candidate	Votes	%	±%
New Democratic	Len J. Arsenault	3,878	39.27%	12.34%
Progressive Conservative	Brian Paul MacKeough	3,215	32.56%	-6.94%
Liberal	Barry LeBlanc	2,782	28.17%	-5.40%
Total valid votes		9,875	99.18	–
Total rejected ballots		82	0.82	–
Turnout		9,957	79.76	+4.78
Eligible voters		12,483		
New Democratic gain from Progressive Conservative		Swing		+9.64
Source(s) Source: Nova Scotia Legislature (2024). "Electoral History for Cape Breton North" (PDF). nslegislature.ca. Nova Scotia, Chief Electoral Officer (1978). Returns of the General Election for the House of Assembly, Twenty-Ninth General Election (PDF) (Report). Queen's Printer. Archived from the original (PDF) on 18 June 2018.

=== 1974 ===
1974 Nova Scotia general election: Cape Breton North
Party	Candidate	Votes	%	±%
Progressive Conservative	Tom MacKeough	4,889	39.50%	-10.54%
Liberal	Barry LeBlanc	4,155	33.57%	8.48%
New Democratic	Len J. Arsenault	3,333	26.93%	2.06%
Total valid votes		12,377	98.94	–
Total rejected ballots		133	1.06	–
Turnout		12,510	74.98	-2.32
Eligible voters		16,684		
Progressive Conservative hold		Swing		-9.51
Source(s) Source: Nova Scotia Legislature (2024). "Electoral History for Cape Breton North" (PDF). nslegislature.ca. Nova Scotia, Chief Electoral Officer (1974). Returns of the General Election for the House of Assembly, Twenty-Eighth General Election (PDF) (Report). Queen's Printer. Archived from the original (PDF) on 18 June 2018.

=== 1970 ===
1970 Nova Scotia general election: Cape Breton North
Party	Candidate	Votes	%	±%
Progressive Conservative	Tom MacKeough	5,755	50.04%	-3.54%
Liberal	Sidney Oram	2,885	25.09%	-6.81%
New Democratic	Len J. Arsenault	2,860	24.87%	10.35%
Total valid votes		11,500	98.86	–
Total rejected ballots		133	1.14	–
Turnout		11,633	77.30	+0.20
Eligible voters		15,049		
Progressive Conservative hold		Swing		-5.18
Source(s) Source: Nova Scotia Legislature (2024). "Electoral History for Cape Breton North" (PDF). nslegislature.ca. Nova Scotia, Legislative Assembly (1970). Returns of the General Election for the House of Assembly, 1970 (PDF) (Report). Queen's Printer. Archived from the original (PDF) on 25 July 2018.

=== 1967 ===
1967 Nova Scotia general election: Cape Breton North
Party	Candidate	Votes	%	±%
Progressive Conservative	Tom MacKeough	5,574	53.59%	-5.13%
Liberal	Alexander O'Handley	3,318	31.90%	3.86%
New Democratic	Gerald Yetman	1,510	14.52%	1.27%
Total valid votes		10,402	99.16	–
Total rejected ballots		88	0.84	–
Turnout		10,490	77.10	+1.31
Eligible voters		13,606		
Progressive Conservative hold		Swing		-4.49
Source(s) Source: Nova Scotia Legislature (2024). "Electoral History for Cape Breton North" (PDF). nslegislature.ca. Nova Scotia Legislature (1967). Returns of the General Election for the House of Assembly (PDF) (Report). Queen's Printer. Archived from the original (PDF) on 25 July 2018.

=== 1963 ===
1963 Nova Scotia general election: Cape Breton North
Party	Candidate	Votes	%	±%
Progressive Conservative	Tom MacKeough	6,200	58.71%	11.88%
Liberal	Murray J. Ryan	2,961	28.04%	0.48%
New Democratic	John Dolhanty	1,399	13.25%	–
Total valid votes		10,560	99.63	–
Total rejected ballots		39	0.37	–
Turnout		10,599	75.79	-6.32
Eligible voters		13,984		
Progressive Conservative hold		Swing		+6.18
Source(s) Source: Nova Scotia Legislature (2024). "Electoral History for Cape Breton North" (PDF). nslegislature.ca. Nova Scotia Legislature (1963). Returns of the General Election for the House of Assembly (PDF) (Report). Queen's Printer. Archived from the original (PDF) on 25 July 2018.

=== 1960 ===
1960 Nova Scotia general election: Cape Breton North
Party	Candidate	Votes	%	±%
Progressive Conservative	Tom MacKeough	5,257	46.83%	-10.86%
Liberal	Ted Sullivan	3,094	27.56%	-14.75%
Co-operative Commonwealth	Thomas R. Macdonald	2,875	25.61%	–
Total valid votes		11,226	99.79	–
Total rejected ballots		24	0.21	–
Turnout		11,250	82.11	+3.95
Eligible voters		13,701		
Progressive Conservative hold		Swing		-12.80
Source(s) Source: Nova Scotia Legislature (2024). "Electoral History for Cape Breton North" (PDF). nslegislature.ca. Nova Scotia Legislature (1960). Returns of the General Election for the House of Assembly (PDF) (Report). Queen's Printer. Archived from the original (PDF) on 25 July 2018.

=== 1956 ===
1956 Nova Scotia general election: Cape Breton North
Party	Candidate	Votes	%	±%
Progressive Conservative	John Michael Macdonald	6,088	57.69%	26.07%
Liberal	Alexander O'Handley	4,465	42.31%	-5.14%
Total valid votes		10,553	99.50	–
Total rejected ballots		53	0.50	–
Turnout		10,606	78.16	+2.10
Eligible voters		13,569		
Progressive Conservative gain from Liberal		Swing		+15.60
Source(s) Source: Nova Scotia Legislature (2024). "Electoral History for Cape Breton North" (PDF). nslegislature.ca. Nova Scotia Legislature (1956). Returns of the General Election for the House of Assembly (PDF) (Report). Queen's Printer. Archived from the original (PDF) on 10 September 2018.

=== 1953 ===
1953 Nova Scotia general election: Cape Breton North
Party	Candidate	Votes	%	±%
Liberal	Alexander O'Handley	4,674	47.45%	1.32%
Progressive Conservative	John Norman MacAskill	3,115	31.62%	2.17%
Co-operative Commonwealth	Daniel Joseph MacEachern	2,062	20.93%	-3.49%
Total valid votes		9,851	99.89	–
Total rejected ballots		11	0.11	–
Turnout		9,862	76.06	-0.78
Eligible voters		12,965		
Liberal hold		Swing		+1.74
Source(s) Source: Nova Scotia Legislature (2024). "Electoral History for Cape Breton North" (PDF). nslegislature.ca. Nova Scotia Legislature (1953). Returns of the General Election for the House of Assembly (PDF) (Report). Queen's Printer. Archived from the original (PDF) on 10 September 2018.

=== 1949 ===
1949 Nova Scotia general election: Cape Breton North
Party	Candidate	Votes	%	±%
Liberal	Alexander O'Handley	4,727	46.13%	7.58%
Progressive Conservative	John Michael Macdonald	3,018	29.45%	1.55%
Co-operative Commonwealth	Wendell Coldwell	2,502	24.42%	-9.12%
Total valid votes		10,247	99.49	–
Total rejected ballots		53	0.51	–
Turnout		10,300	76.84	+10.78
Eligible voters		13,405		
Liberal hold		Swing		+4.56
Source(s) Source: Nova Scotia Legislature (2024). "Electoral History for Cape Breton North" (PDF). nslegislature.ca. Nova Scotia Legislature (1949). Returns of the General Election for the House of Assembly (PDF) (Report). Queen's Printer. Archived from the original (PDF) on 10 September 2018.

=== 1945 ===
1945 Nova Scotia general election: Cape Breton North
Party	Candidate	Votes	%	±%
Liberal	Alexander O'Handley	3,338	38.55%	-1.41%
Co-operative Commonwealth	Wendell Coldwell	2,904	33.54%	2.04%
Progressive Conservative	Malcolm McDonald	2,416	27.90%	-0.62%
Total valid votes		8,658	99.32	–
Total rejected ballots		59	0.68	–
Turnout		8,717	66.06	-0.73
Eligible voters		13,196		
Liberal hold		Swing		-1.73
Source(s) Source: Nova Scotia Legislature (2024). "Electoral History for Cape Breton North" (PDF). nslegislature.ca. Nova Scotia Legislature (1945). Returns of the General Election for the House of Assembly (PDF) (Report). Queen's Printer. Archived from the original (PDF) on 10 September 2018.

=== 1941 ===
1941 Nova Scotia general election: Cape Breton North
Party	Candidate	Votes	%	±%
Liberal	Alexander O'Handley	3,344	39.97%	-11.76%
Co-operative Commonwealth	Robert Silas Bartlett	2,636	31.50%	–
Progressive Conservative	Joseph Angus MacDougall	2,387	28.53%	-19.74%
Total valid votes		8,367	99.44	–
Total rejected ballots		47	0.56	–
Turnout		8,414	66.79	-10.34
Eligible voters		12,598		
Liberal hold		Swing		-21.63
Source(s) Source: Nova Scotia Legislature (2024). "Electoral History for Cape Breton North" (PDF). nslegislature.ca. Nova Scotia Legislature (1941). Returns of the General Election for the House of Assembly (PDF) (Report). Queen's Printer. Archived from the original (PDF) on 8 February 2024.

=== 1937 ===
1937 Nova Scotia general election: Cape Breton North
Party	Candidate	Votes	%	±%
Liberal	George Belcher Murray	4,679	51.73%	5.49%
Progressive Conservative	Joseph Macdonald	4,366	48.27%	–
Total valid votes		9,045	99.79	–
Total rejected ballots		19	0.21	–
Turnout		9,064	77.13	-7.85
Eligible voters		11,751		
Liberal gain from Progressive Conservative		Swing		+3.13
Source(s) Source: Nova Scotia Legislature (2024). "Electoral History for Cape Breton North" (PDF). nslegislature.ca. Nova Scotia Legislature (1937). Returns of the General Election for the House of Assembly (PDF) (Report). Queen's Printer. Archived from the original (PDF) on 1 March 2019.

=== 1933 ===
1933 Nova Scotia general election: Cape Breton North
Party	Candidate	Votes	%	±%
Liberal-Conservative	Joseph Macdonald	4,448	47.50%	–
Liberal	Luke Daye	4,330	46.24%	–
United Front	John MacDonald	586	6.26%	–
Total valid votes		9,364	99.43	–
Total rejected ballots		54	0.57	–
Turnout		9,418	84.98	–
Eligible voters		11,082		
Progressive Conservative notional hold		Swing		–
Source(s) Source: Nova Scotia Legislature (2024). "Electoral History for Cape Breton North" (PDF). nslegislature.ca. Nova Scotia Legislature (1933). Returns of the General Election for the House of Assembly (PDF) (Report). Queen's Printer. Archived from the original (PDF) on 1 March 2019.

== See also ==
- List of Nova Scotia provincial electoral districts
- Canadian provincial electoral districts
