= John Michael Macdonald =

Canadian politician

The Honourable John Michael Macdonald

Senator for Cape Breton, Nova Scotia
- In office June 24, 1960 – June 20, 1997
- Appointed by: John Diefenbaker

Member of the Nova Scotia House of Assembly for Cape Breton North
- In office 1956–1960
- Preceded by: Alexander O'Handley
- Succeeded by: Tom McKeough

Personal details
- Born: May 3, 1906 North Sydney, Nova Scotia
- Died: June 20, 1997 (aged 91)
- Party: Progressive Conservative
- Other political affiliations: Nova Scotia Progressive Conservative Party
- Relations: Joseph Macdonald, father
- Portfolio: Opposition Whip in the Senate (1963-1979 & 1980-1984); Government Whip in the Senate (1979-1980)

John Michael Macdonald (May 3, 1906 – June 20, 1997) was a Canadian politician.

== Early life ==
Born in North Sydney, Nova Scotia, the son of Joseph Macdonald and Theresa MacDonald, he was educated at St. Francis Xavier University and Dalhousie University. He was called to the Nova Scotia bar in 1945.

== Career ==
He practised law with his father and with Ronald J. Macdonald. During World War II, Macdonald served with the Royal Canadian Electrical and Mechanical Engineers and with the Royal Canadian Ordnance Corps.

He ran unsuccessfully as the National Government candidate (the label used by the Conservative Party/Progressive Conservative Party during those elections) for the House of Commons of Canada in the riding of Cape Breton North and Victoria in the 1940 election and 1945 election. In 1956, he was elected to the Nova Scotia House of Assembly, representing the electoral district of Cape Breton North.

== As Senator ==
Summoned to the Senate of Canada in 1960 representing the senatorial division of Cape Breton, Nova Scotia, a Progressive Conservative, he was twice Opposition Whip in the Senate (1963–1979 and 1980–1984) and was Government Whip in the Senate (1979–1980). He was the last senator to serve in the senate past the age of 75, and one of the last senators appointed for life serving in the Senate (Orville Howard Phillips was the last senator with a lifetime appointment. He resigned in 1999).

== Death ==
Macdonald died in North Sydney, Nova Scotia in 1997;
