= 2010 Nova Scotia provincial by-elections =

Canadian provincial by-elections

Three provincial by-elections were held in Nova Scotia in 2010 to fill vacancies in the House of Assembly.

== Glace Bay ==
The district of Glace Bay was vacated by Liberal Party MNA Dave Wilson; Geoff MacLellan won the election to replace him on June 22, 2010.

Byelection June 22, 2010
Party	Candidate	Votes	%	±%
Liberal	Geoff MacLellan	3901	53.91	
NDP	Myrtle Campbell	2281	31.52	
PC	Michelle Wheelhouse	759	10.48	
Independent	Edna Lee	195	2.69	
Atlantica	Dan Wilson	56	0.77	

== Yarmouth ==
The district of Yarmouth was vacated by Progressive Conservative MNA Richard Hurlburt; Zach Churchill won the election to replace him on June 22, 2010.

Byelection June 22, 2010
Party	Candidate	Votes	%	±%
Liberal	Zach Churchill	3986	50.65	+36.58
Progressive Conservative	Charles Crosby	2628	33.41	-27.93
Independent	Belle Hatfield	673	8.56	Ø
New Democratic Party	John Deveau	513	6.52	-16.41
Green	John Percy	48	0.62	-1.04
Atlantica	Jonathan Dean	19	0.24	Ø

== Cumberland South ==
The district of Cumberland South was vacated by Progressive Conservative MNA Murray Scott; Jamie Baillie won the election to replace him on October 26, 2010.

October 26, 2010 by-election
Party	Candidate	Votes	%	±%
Progressive Conservative	Jamie Baillie	3,262	57.20%	
Liberal	Kenny Jackson	2,165	37.96%	
New Democratic Party	Scott McKee	276	4.84%	
