= Dave Ritcey =

Canadian politician

The Honourable Dave Ritcey ECNS MLA
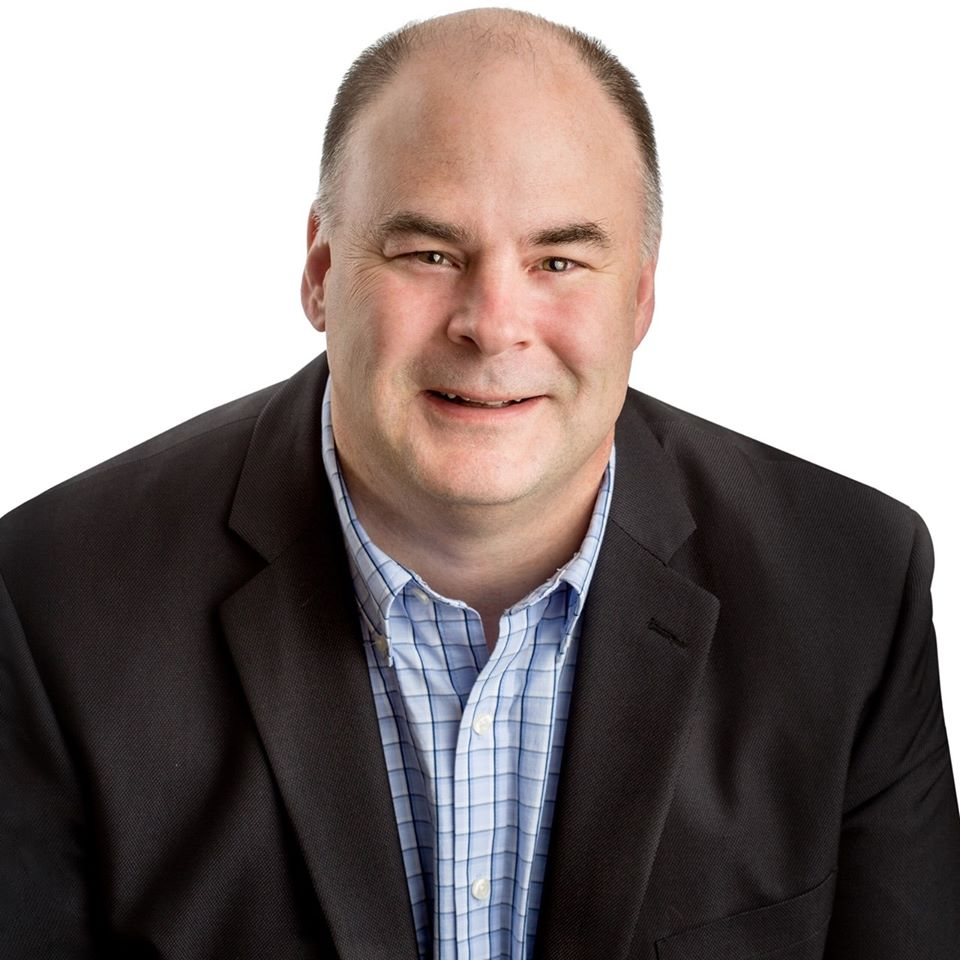

Member of the Nova Scotia House of Assembly for Truro-Bible Hill-Millbrook-Salmon River
- Incumbent
- Assumed office March 10, 2020
- Preceded by: Lenore Zann

Personal details
- Born: David Mark Ritcey; October 10, 1971 (age 54) Truro, Nova Scotia
- Party: Progressive Conservative
- Spouse: Amber Ball Ritcey (m. 2003)

David Mark Ritcey (born October 10, 1971) is a Canadian politician who was elected to the Nova Scotia House of Assembly in a by-election on March 10, 2020. A member of the Progressive Conservative Association of Nova Scotia, he represents the electoral district of Truro-Bible Hill-Millbrook-Salmon River. He has had many years of hockey coaching experience and is a former interim president of the Maritime Junior Hockey League. His grandfather, Gerald Ritcey, had been a MLA for Colchester, parts of which became the current riding, from 1968 to 1974.

On December 12, 2024, Ritcey was appointed to the Executive Council of Nova Scotia as Minister of Communities, Culture, Tourism and Heritage.

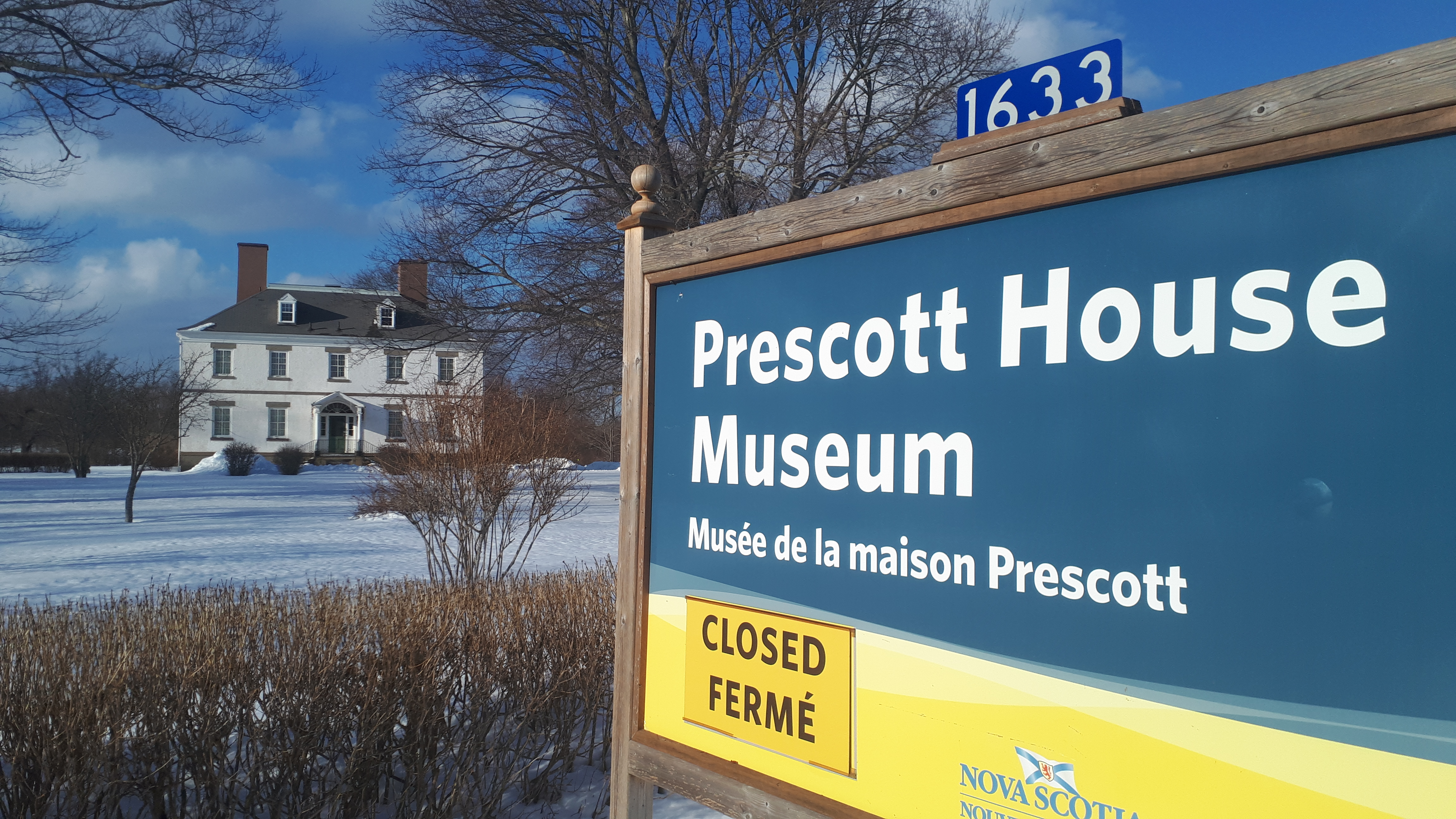
Prescott House Museum one of 12 museums closed by Ritcey's department.

On February 20, 2026 Ritcey oversaw $130 million dollars in cuts to cultural programs including cuts to scholarships, arts and publishing grants and programs for Mi'kmaw, Black and Gaelic communities, climate change, health, seniors and youth. He also made unprecedented reductions to the Nova Scotia Museum closing 12 of the 28 sites of the museum system, focusing on closing museums in rural Nova Scotia. Days after the budget was tabled, Ritcey was unable to provide any specific details to reporters during a press conference, deferring instead to staff who had informed organizations impacted by the cuts with a form letter containing no further explanation. He told reporters the cuts were needed to focus on resources that make the most difference.

== Electoral record ==
=== 2024 general election ===
2024 Nova Scotia general election: Truro-Bible Hill-Millbrook-Salmon River
Party	Candidate	Votes	%	±%
Progressive Conservative	Dave Ritcey	4,034	67.76	+19.92
New Democratic	Cailen Pygott	1,067	17.92	+1.30
Liberal	Frank Johnston	852	14.31	-15.89
Total valid votes		5,953		
Total rejected ballots		38		
Turnout		5,994	35.27	
Eligible voters		16,996		
Progressive Conservative hold		Swing		
Source: Elections Nova Scotia

=== 2021 general election ===
2021 Nova Scotia general election
Party	Candidate	Votes	%	±%
Progressive Conservative	Dave Ritcey	4,025	47.85	-3.55
Liberal	Tamara Tynes Powell	2,541	30.21	+5.85
New Democratic	Darlene DeAdder	1,398	16.62	+0.35
Green	Shaun Trainor	448	5.33	-1.67
Total valid votes		8,412	99.68	
Total rejected ballots		27	0.32	
Turnout		8,439	51.11	
Eligible voters		16,510		
Progressive Conservative hold		Swing		-4.70
Source: Elections Nova Scotia

=== 2020 by-election results ===
Nova Scotia provincial by-election, March 10, 2020 Upon the resignation of Lenore Zann
Party	Candidate	Votes	%	±%
Progressive Conservative	Dave Ritcey	2,922	51.40	+19.44
Liberal	Allan Kennedy	1,385	24.36	+0.27
New Democratic	Kathleen Kevany	925	16.27	-27.68
Green	Ivan Drouin	398	7.00	
Atlantica	Matthew Rushton	55	0.97	
Total valid votes		5,685	99.61	
Total rejected ballots		22	0.39	-0.35
Turnout		5,707	35.72	-12.71
Eligible voters		15,975		
Progressive Conservative gain from New Democratic		Swing		+23.56
