= Murray Ryan (Canadian politician) =

Canadian politician

Member of the Nova Scotia House of Assembly for Northside-Westmount
- In office September 3, 2019 – July 17, 2021
- Preceded by: Eddie Orrell
- Succeeded by: Fred Tilley

Personal details
- Born: 1966 or 1967 (age 59–60) North Sydney, Nova Scotia, Canada
- Party: Progressive Conservative

Murray Ryan (born 1966 or 1967) is a Canadian politician, who was elected to the Nova Scotia House of Assembly in a by-election on September 3, 2019. He represented the electoral district of Northside-Westmount as a member of the Progressive Conservative Association of Nova Scotia caucus until his defeat in the 2021 Nova Scotia general election.

Prior to his election to the legislature, Ryan worked as an accountant. He was selected as the party's replacement candidate in the by-election, after the dismissal of original candidate Danny Laffin.
