= Eddie Orrell =

Canadian politician

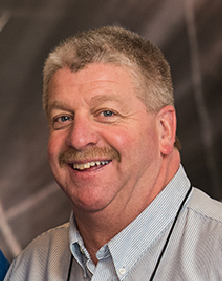
- Orrell in 2016

Member of the Nova Scotia House of Assembly for Northside-Westmount Cape Breton North (2011–2013)
- In office June 21, 2011 – July 31, 2019
- Preceded by: Cecil Clarke
- Succeeded by: Murray Ryan

Personal details
- Born: February 7, 1965 (age 61) Yarmouth, Nova Scotia
- Party: Progressive Conservative
- Occupation: physiotherapist

Ralph Edward Orrell (born February 7, 1965) is a Canadian politician. He represented the electoral district of Northside-Westmount in the Nova Scotia House of Assembly from June 2011 to July 2019 as a Progressive Conservative.

On June 21, 2011, Orrell was elected in a byelection for the electoral district of Cape Breton North. In the 2013 provincial election, Orrell was re-elected in the new riding of Northside-Westmount. He was re-elected in the 2017 election.

On May 10, 2019, Orrell announced he will seek the Conservative nomination in Sydney—Victoria for the 2019 federal election. On July 15, 2019, it was announced that Orrell was selected as the candidate. Orrell resigned his provincial seat on July 31, 2019.

== Education ==
He graduated from Memorial Composite High School in 1983 and from Dalhousie University in 1987.

== Electoral record ==
=== Federal elections ===
2021 Canadian federal election: Sydney—Victoria
Party	Candidate	Votes	%	±%	Expenditures
Liberal	Jaime Battiste	14,250	39.2	+8.3	$68,768.55
Conservative	Eddie Orrell	13,166	36.3	+8.6	none listed
New Democratic	Jeff Ward	7,217	19.9	-0.2	$11,605.07
People's	Ronald Angus Barron	1,176	3.2	N/A	$1,145.74
Green	Mark Embrett	376	1.0	-4.5	$0.00
Marxist–Leninist	Nikki Boisvert	127	0.3	N/A	$0.00
Total valid votes/expense limit		36,312	98.7	±0.0	$102,433.21
Total rejected ballots		472	1.3	±0.0	
Turnout		36,784	61.6	-6.5	
Registered voters		59,757			
Liberal hold		Swing		-0.2	
Source: Elections Canada

2019 Canadian federal election: Sydney—Victoria
Party	Candidate	Votes	%	±%	Expenditures
Liberal	Jaime Battiste	12,536	30.90	−42.30	$63,429.21
Conservative	Eddie Orrell	11,227	27.68	+17.04	none listed
New Democratic	Jodi McDavid	8,146	20.08	+7.02	none listed
Independent	Archie MacKinnon	5,679	14.00	New	none listed
Green	Lois Foster	2,249	5.54	+3.04	$0.00
Independent	Kenzie MacNeil	480	1.18	New	none listed
Veterans Coalition	Randy Joy	248	0.61	New	$0.00
Total valid votes/expense limit		40,565	98.72		$99,536.07
Total rejected ballots		528	1.28	+0.71	
Turnout		41,093	68.12	−0.84	
Eligible voters		60,322			
Liberal hold		Swing		−29.67	
Source: Elections Canada

=== Provincial elections ===
2013 Nova Scotia general election
Party	Candidate	Votes	%	±%
Progressive Conservative	Eddie Orrell	4,179	44.03	
Liberal	John Higgins	3,716	39.12	
New Democratic Party	Cecil Snow	1,597	16.82	

June 21, 2011 By-election
Party	Candidate	Votes	%	±%
Progressive Conservative	Eddie Orrell	3,975	54.88	
New Democratic Party	Russell MacDonald	2,265	31.27	
Liberal	Brian McGean	931	12.85	
Atlantica	Jonathan Dean	72	0.99	
