= Fred Tilley =

Canadian politician

The Honourable Fred Tilley ECNS MLA

Member of the Nova Scotia House of Assembly for Northside-Westmount
- Incumbent
- Assumed office August 17, 2021
- Preceded by: Murray Ryan

Personal details
- Born: November 12, 1968 (age 57) Cape Breton, Nova Scotia, Canada
- Party: Progressive Conservative (2024–)
- Other political affiliations: Liberal (until 2024)
- Spouse: Jean Tilley
- Occupation: MLA for Northside-Westmount

Fred Tilley (born November 12, 1968) is a Canadian politician who was elected to the Nova Scotia House of Assembly in the 2021 Nova Scotia general election. He represents the riding of Northside-Westmount as a member of the Nova Scotia Progressive Conservatives, having been elected as a member of the Nova Scotia Liberal Party.

Prior to becoming an MLA, Tilley worked in the retail, construction, fishing, harvesting, and post-secondary education industries. Tilley served as Principal of NSCC's Marconi Campus from 2013 to 2021 and Academic Chair from 2001 to 2013.

== Political career ==
Following the resignation of Liberal Party of Nova Scotia leader Iain Rankin, Tilley publicly expressed his interest in launching a bid for the leader. However, on February 18, 2021, Tilley announced his intent to support Angela Simmonds for leader of the Nova Scotia Liberal Party.

Tilley is a member of the Community Services Committee.

On October 22, 2024, Tilley crossed the floor to the Nova Scotia Progressive Conservatives.

Tilley was re-elected in the 2024 election.

On December 12, 2024, Tilley was appointed to the Executive Council of Nova Scotia as Minister of Public Works.

== Bills introduced ==
Assembly	Act Title	Date
Assembly 64, Session 1	Consumer Protection Office Act	October 25, 2021

== Electoral record ==
2024 Nova Scotia general election: Northside-Westmount
Party	Candidate	Votes	%	±%
Progressive Conservative	Fred Tilley	4,978	67.89	+31.38
Liberal	Danny Laffin	1,675	22.85	-24.02
New Democratic	Katelyn Armstrong	679	9.26	-7.37
Total valid votes		7,332		
Total rejected ballots		46		
Turnout		7,379	45.05	
Eligible voters		16,381		
Progressive Conservative gain		Swing		
Source: Elections Nova Scotia

2021 Nova Scotia general election
Party	Candidate	Votes	%	±%
Liberal	Fred Tilley	4,030	46.86	+25.49
Progressive Conservative	Murray Ryan	3,140	36.51	+7.55
New Democratic	Jennifer Morrison	1,430	16.63	-0.36
Total valid votes		8,600	99.20	
Total rejected ballots		69	0.80	
Turnout		8,669	53.34	
Eligible voters		16,251		
Liberal gain from Progressive Conservative		Swing		+8.97
Source: Elections Nova Scotia
