= Brian Comer =

Canadian politician

The Honourable Brian Comer ECNS MLA

Member of the Nova Scotia House of Assembly for Sydney River-Mira-Louisbourg
- Incumbent
- Assumed office September 3, 2019
- Preceded by: Alfie MacLeod

Personal details
- Born: December 26, 1985 (age 40) Sydney, Nova Scotia
- Party: Progressive Conservative

Brian Keith Comer (born December 26, 1985) is a Canadian politician who was elected to the Nova Scotia House of Assembly in a by-election on September 3, 2019. He represents the electoral district of Sydney River-Mira-Louisbourg as a member of the Progressive Conservative Association of Nova Scotia caucus.

On August 31, 2021, Comer was made Minister of Communications Nova Scotia, as well as Minister responsible for Youth and Mental Health and Addictions.

Prior to his election to the legislature, Comer worked as mental health and addictions nurse at the Cape Breton Regional Hospital.

== Electoral record ==
2024 Nova Scotia general election: Cape Breton East
Party	Candidate	Votes	%	±%
Progressive Conservative	Brian Comer	4,250	61.34	+15.07
Liberal	Joe Ward	1,737	25.07	-11.66
New Democratic	Isabel Lalonde	942	13.60	-3.41
Total		6,929	–	
Total rejected ballots		50		
Turnout		6,980	48.50	
Eligible voters		14,391		
Progressive Conservative hold		Swing		
Source: Elections Nova Scotia

2021 Nova Scotia general election: Cape Breton East
Party	Candidate	Votes	%	±%	Expenditures
Progressive Conservative	Brian Comer	3,897	46.27	+2.54	$55,547.93
Liberal	Heather Peters	3,094	36.73	+5.36	$65,200.97
New Democratic	Barbara Beaton	1,432	17.00	+9.32	$24,642.72
Total valid votes/expense limit		8,423	99.37	-0.29	$81,087.67
Total rejected ballots		53	0.63	+0.29	
Turnout		8,476	61.42	+12.56	
Eligible voters		13,801			
Progressive Conservative hold		Swing		-1.41	
Source: Elections Nova Scotia
