= Hugh MacKay (Nova Scotia politician) =

Canadian politician

Member of the Nova Scotia House of Assembly for Chester-St. Margaret's
- In office May 30, 2017 – July 17, 2021
- Preceded by: Denise Peterson-Rafuse
- Succeeded by: Danielle Barkhouse

Personal details
- Born: 1954/1955 Nova Scotia, Canada
- Party: Independent (since 2020); Liberal (until 2020)
- Occupation: Consultant

Hugh Wilson MacKay (born 1954 or 1955) is a Canadian politician. He was elected to the Nova Scotia House of Assembly in the 2017 provincial election, defeating incumbent Denise Peterson-Rafuse of the NDP. An independent, he represented the electoral district of Chester-St. Margaret's until 2021.

== Early life and education ==
Born in Nova Scotia, MacKay graduated from Dalhousie University in 1978. MacKay then graduated from Nova Scotia Community College Centre of Geographic Sciences in 1980.

== Career ==
He was the president of the Geomatics Association of Nova Scotia in 2015/16. He is a graduate of Nova Scotia Community College and Dalhousie University.

== Personal life ==
MacKay lives in Glen Haven, Nova Scotia, and has two adult children, Sarah and Kevin.

== Controversy ==
In October 2019, it was announced Hugh MacKay was charged with driving under the influence of alcohol over the 2019 Thanksgiving weekend. RCMP said MacKay was arrested without incident. He was subsequently fined $2,000 and his license suspended for one year after his blood alcohol level was found to be over twice the legal limit.

== Electoral record ==
=== 2017 general election ===
2017 Nova Scotia general election
Party	Candidate	Votes	%	±%
Liberal	Hugh MacKay	3,112	35.46	+4.40
New Democratic	Denise Peterson-Rafuse	3,022	34.43	-0.82
Progressive Conservative	Julie Chaisson	2,229	25.40	-8.29
Green	Harry Ward	413	4.71	N/A
Total valid votes		8,776	100.0	
Total rejected ballots		32	0.21	
Turnout		8,808	57.60	
Eligible voters		15,291		
