= Atlantica Party =

Provincial political party in Canada

- Defunct provincial party
- Leader: Kyle Woodbury
- Founder: Jonathan Dean
- Founded: 2005
- Registered: March 8, 2010 (original); June 28, 2016 (relaunch)
- Dissolved: June 5, 2012 (original); April 30, 2024 (relaunch)
- Headquarters: 36 Heritage Drive; Antigonish, Nova Scotia; B2G 2T6
- Membership (2021): 100-200
- Ideology: Classical liberalism; Laissez-faire economics
- Colours: Blue and white
- Seats in House of Assembly: 0 / 55

Website
- Official website

The Atlantica Party was a political party in the province of Nova Scotia, Canada. The party supported policies that are based on classical liberal principles such as laissez-faire "free market" economics, freedom of business, and freedom of the individual. The party also sought to increase citizen participation in all levels of government with additional oversight of current government structure.

== History ==
The Atlantica Party was originally founded in 2005 as a political action group. It was organized as a political party by Jonathan Dean in 2009. That year, Dean also ran as an independent in the provincial election.

It first officially registered as a political party with Elections Nova Scotia on March 8, 2010. It contested the 2010 Nova Scotia provincial by-elections in Glace Bay and Yarmouth, finishing a distant last place in both ridings. The party also ran in the Cape Breton North by-election in 2011, where they were also unsuccessful. The first iteration of the party was de-registered on June 5, 2012.

After being de-registered, the party remained active and fielded three candidates who ran as independents in the 2013 election, including Dean.

The Atlantica Party was re-registered as a political party by Elections Nova Scotia on June 28, 2016. Its first contested election was the 2017 provincial election. The party ran 15 candidates then and received a total of 1,632 votes, 0.4% of the provincial total.

On January 2, 2018, inaugural party leader Jonathan Dean announced his resignation from the party. Ryan Smyth was named as interim leader of the party on January 16, 2018; however, he took over as interim leader on January 7, 2018, the effective date of Dean's resignation.

On June 20, 2018, Chief Electoral Officer of Elections Nova Scotia, Richard Temporale, suspended the party for breaches of sections 216(3)(a) and 216(3)(b) respectively due to an illegal loan made by former leader, Jonathan Dean. On July 31, Mr. Dean entered into a compliance agreement with Elections Nova Scotia. The party entered into its own compliance agreement with Elections Nova Scotia on August 7, 2018. The party was reinstated by Elections Nova Scotia on August 16, 2018.

The Atlantica Party contested three by-elections to the 63rd General Assembly of Nova Scotia. On June 18, 2019, David Boyd received 43 votes, 0.7% of the total vote in the riding of Sackville-Cobequid. On September 3, 2019, interim leader, Thomas Bethell received 28 votes, 0.4% of the total vote in the riding of Northside-Westmount. On March 10, 2020, Matthew Rushton received 55 votes, 1.0% of the total in the electoral district of Truro-Bible Hill-Millbrook-Salmon River.

On November 20, 2020, the party finally issued an announcement that Mr. Dean had returned as leader, nearly three months after he was appointed by the executive without any consultation with the party's membership.

The party did not win any seats in the 2021 provincial election.

On April 17, 2023, Kyle Woodbury, a former election readiness staffer for the Conservative Party of Canada, was named as the new party leader. The move was announced on July 4, 2023.

On April 30, 2024, the party was voluntarily deregistered. The party cited a shortage of volunteers as the reason for the deregistration.

== Party leaders ==
- Jonathan Geoffrey Dean (2005 – January 7, 2018)
- Jeffrey Ryan Smyth (interim) (January 7, 2018 – unknown)
- Thomas James Bethell (interim) (2019)
- Jonathan Geoffrey Dean (c. August 31, 2020 – April 2023)
- Kyle Woodbury (April 17, 2023 – April 30, 2024)

== Election results ==
Election	Leader	Candidates	Votes	%	Seats	Place	Parliamentary position
2017	Jonathan Dean	15 / 51	1,632	0.4	0 / 51	5th	Extra-parliamentary
2021	Jonathan Dean	15 / 55	1,023	0.2	0 / 55	5th	Extra-parliamentary

Results as independent candidates

Party affiliated candidates who ran as independents while the Atlantica Party was unregistered.

General election	Riding	Candidate	Votes	%	Place
2009	Clayton Park West	Jonathan Dean	51	0.50	5/5
2013	Hammonds Plains-Lucasville	Jonathan Dean	104	1.60	4/4
2013	Dartmouth South	James Anthony (Jim) Murray	178	2.03	4/4
2013	Halifax Citadel-Sable Island	Frederic Boileau-Cadieux	31	0.50	5/5

=== By-elections ===
By-election	Date	Candidate	Votes	%	Place
Glace Bay	June 22, 2010	Dan Wilson	56	0.77%	5/5
Yarmouth	June 22, 2010	Jonathan Dean	19	0.24%	6/6
Cape Breton North	June 21, 2011	Jonathan Dean	72	0.99%	4/4
Sackville-Cobequid	June 18, 2019	David F. Boyd	43	0.68%	5/5
Northside-Westmount	September 3, 2019	Thomas Bethell	28	0.36%	7/7
Truro-Bible Hill-Millbrook-Salmon River	March 10, 2020	Matthew Rushton	55	0.97%	5/5
