= Barbara Adams (politician) =

Canadian politician (born 1962)

The Honourable Barbara Adams ECNS MLA

Deputy Premier of Nova Scotia
- Incumbent
- Assumed office December 12, 2024
- Premier: Tim Houston
- Preceded by: Tim Halman

Member of the Nova Scotia House of Assembly for Eastern Passage Cole Harbour-Eastern Passage (2017-2021)
- Incumbent
- Assumed office May 30, 2017
- Preceded by: Joyce Treen

Personal details
- Born: 1962 (age 63–64)
- Party: Progressive Conservative
- Spouse: N/A
- Occupation: Physiotherapist

Barbara Anne Adams (born 1962) is a Canadian politician, who was elected to the Nova Scotia House of Assembly in the 2017 provincial election. A member of the Progressive Conservative Association of Nova Scotia, she represents the electoral district of Eastern Passage. Adams was the PC critic for Community Services; and the Advisory Council on the Status of Women.

== Early life and education ==
Adams graduated from Dartmouth High School in 1980 and then from Dalhousie University with a Bachelor of Science in Physical Therapy in 1984.

== Career ==
Adams was a physiotherapist and owned and operated a chronic pain clinic in Cole Harbour.

On August 31, 2021, Adams was made the first Minister of Seniors and Long-term Care.

On April 22, 2024, Adams was appointed Minister of Justice and Attorney General.

== Electoral record ==
2024 Nova Scotia general election: Eastern Passage
Party	Candidate	Votes	%	±%
Progressive Conservative	Barbara Adams	2,754	63.75	18.93
Liberal	Chris Peters	1,110	25.69	-0.52
Independent	Tammy Jakeman	456	10.56	–
Total		4,320	–	
Total rejected ballots		85		
Turnout		4,408	40.82	
Eligible voters		10,798		
Progressive Conservative hold		Swing		
Source: Elections Nova Scotia

2021 Nova Scotia general election: Eastern Passage
Party	Candidate	Votes	%	±%	Expenditures
Progressive Conservative	Barbara Adams	2,469	44.82	+9.11	$29,475.98
Liberal	Joyce Treen	1,444	26.21	-8.60	$45,473.02
New Democratic	Tammy Jakeman	1,222	22.18	-2.56	$24,550.06
Green	Corey Myers	374	6.79	+1.95	$2,771.86
Total valid votes/expense limit		5,509	99.53	–	$64,783.35
Total rejected ballots		26	0.47		
Turnout		5,535	52.65		
Eligible voters		10,512			
Progressive Conservative notional hold		Swing		+8.86	
Source: Elections Nova Scotia

2017 Nova Scotia general election
Party	Candidate	Votes	%	±%
Progressive Conservative	Barbara Adams	2,682	36.40	+15.74
Liberal	Joyce Treen	2,585	35.08	-5.54
New Democratic	Nancy Jakeman	1,759	23.87	-14.85
Green	Rebecca Mosher	343	4.65	+4.65
Total valid votes		7,369	100.0	
