= Larry Harrison (politician) =

Canadian politician

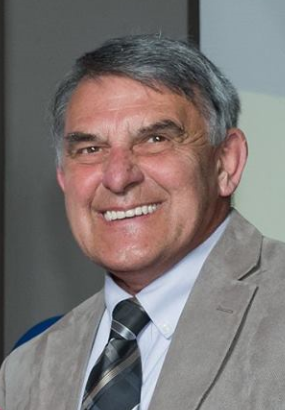

Member of the Nova Scotia House of Assembly for Colchester-Musquodoboit Valley
- In office October 8, 2013 – October 27, 2024
- Preceded by: Gary Burrill
- Succeeded by: Scott Armstrong

Personal details
- Born: Saint John, New Brunswick
- Party: Progressive Conservative

William Lawrence "Larry" Harrison is a Canadian politician, who was first elected to the Nova Scotia House of Assembly in the 2013 provincial election. A member of the Progressive Conservative Party of Nova Scotia, he represented the electoral district of Colchester-Musquodoboit Valley.

He was re-elected in the 2017 and 2021 provincial elections. He did not run in 2024.

== Electoral record ==
2021 Nova Scotia general election: Colchester-Musquodoboit Valley
Party	Candidate	Votes	%	±%	Expenditures
Progressive Conservative	Larry Harrison	4,117	55.13	+4.56	$37,087.10
Liberal	Rhonda MacLellan	1,913	25.62	-1.32	$32,423.06
New Democratic	Janet Moulton	1,438	19.26	-3.23	$36,115.07
Total valid votes/expense limit		7,468	99.60	+0.33	$83,775.96
Total rejected ballots		30	0.40	-0.33	
Turnout		7,498	52.36	+1.18	
Eligible voters		14,321			
Progressive Conservative hold		Swing		+2.94	
Source: Elections Nova Scotia

2017 Nova Scotia general election: Colchester-Musquodoboit Valley
Party	Candidate	Votes	%	±%
Progressive Conservative	Larry Harrison	3,655	50.57	+8.30
Liberal	Matthew Rushton	1,947	26.94	-1.46
New Democratic	Janet Moulton	1,625	22.49	-6.84
Total valid votes		7,227	100.0	
Total rejected ballots		53		
Turnout		7,280	51.2	
Eligible voters		14,225		

2013 Nova Scotia general election: Colchester-Musquodoboit Valley
Party	Candidate	Votes	%	±%
Progressive Conservative	Larry Harrison	3,304	42.27	
New Democratic Party	Gary Burrill	2,293	29.33	
Liberal	Tom Martin	2,220	28.40	
