= Executive Council of Nova Scotia =

Cabinet of the Canadian province

The Executive Council of Nova Scotia (informally and more commonly, the Cabinet of Nova Scotia) is the cabinet of the Canadian province of Nova Scotia.

Almost always made up of members of the Nova Scotia House of Assembly, the cabinet is similar in structure and role to the federal Canadian cabinet, though smaller in size with different portfolios.

The Lieutenant Governor of Nova Scotia, as representative of the King in Right of Nova Scotia, heads the executive council, and is referred to as the Governor-in-Council. Other members are selected by the Premier of Nova Scotia and appointed by the Lieutenant-Governor. Most cabinet ministers are the head of a department, but this is not always the case.

== Honorifics ==
Since 2007, former Executive Councillors are automatically appointed honorary members of the Executive Council and styled "the Honourable" with the post-nominal letters "ECNS" for life upon leaving office. In 2009, this right was extended to all living former Executive Councillors. Honorary membership is automatically terminated upon conviction for an indictable offence punishable by more than five years imprisonment.

== Current cabinet ==
The current ministry has been in place since May 27, 2026, following a cabinet shuffle.

Lieutenant-Governor
Michael Savage		(2024–)
Portfolio	Minister	
Premier of Nova Scotia: President of the Executive Council; Minister of Intergovernmental Affairs; Minister of Trade	Tim Houston	(2021–)
Deputy Premier: Deputy President of the Executive Council; Minister of Seniors and Long-term Care; Minister responsible for Military Relations	Barbara Adams	(2024–)
Minister of Finance and Treasury Board: Minister of Labour Relations	John Lohr	(2024–)
Minister of Environment and Climate Change: Minister of Service Efficiency; Chair of Treasury and Policy Board	Tim Halman	(2024–)
Minister of Emergency Management	Kim Masland	(2024–)
Minister of Natural Resources	Tory Rushton	(2026–)
Minister of Growth and Development: Minister of Acadian Affairs and Francophonie	Colton LeBlanc	(2024–)
Minister of Addictions and Mental Health	Brian Comer	(2024–)
Minister of Health and Wellness: Minister responsible for the Office of Healthcare Professionals Recruitment; Minister responsible for Healthcare Redevelopment	Michelle Thompson	(2021–)
Minister of Cyber Security and Digital Solutions: Minister of Service Nova Scotia	Jill S. Balser	(2024–)
Minister of Agriculture	Greg Morrow	(2021–)
Minister of Opportunities and Social Development	Susan Corkum-Greek	(2026–)
Minister of Fisheries and Aquaculture	Kent Smith	(2023–)
Minister of Advanced Education	Brian Wong	(2026–)
Minister of African Nova Scotian Affairs: Minister of the Public Service Commission	Twila Grosse	(2023–)
Minister of Education and Early Childhood Development	Brendan Maguire	(2024–)
Minister of Communities, Culture, Tourism and Heritage: Minister of Gaelic Affairs	Dave Ritcey	(2024–)
Minister of Public Works	Fred Tilley	(2024–)
Minister of Labour, Skills and Immigration	Nolan Young	(2024–)
Attorney General and Minister of Justice: Provincial Secretary; Minister of Equity and Anti-Racism	Scott Armstrong	(2025–)
Minister of Communications: Minister responsible for L'nu Affairs; Minister responsible for the Advisory Council on the Status of Women Act; Minister responsible for Youth	Leah Martin	(2024–)
Minister of Housing	John White	(2025–)
Minister of Energy	Marco MacLeod	(2026–)
Minister of Municipal Affairs	John A. MacDonald	(2025–)

== See also ==
- Westminster system
- Executive Council (Commonwealth countries)
- Nova Scotia House of Assembly
- Nova Scotia Council
- Legislative Council of Nova Scotia
