= 2018 Progressive Conservative Association of Nova Scotia leadership election =

Progressive Conservative leadership election
- October 27, 2018
- Turnout: 77.12%
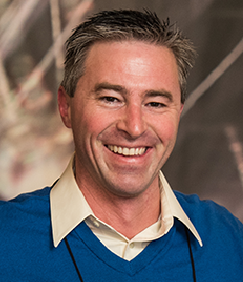

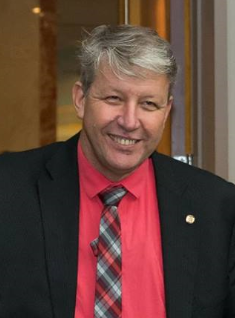
		CC
Candidate	Tim Houston	Cecil Clarke	John Lohr
Home riding	Pictou East	None	Kings North
First ballot	2,496.75; 48.95%	1,385.71; 27.17%	692.45; 13.58%
Second ballot	Winner	Withdrew	Withdrew
	ESM	JC
Candidate	Elizabeth Smith-McCrossin	Julie Chaisson
Home riding	Cumberland North	None
First ballot	384.96; 7.55%	140.13; 2.75%
Second ballot	Withdrew	Dropped

2018 Progressive Conservative Association of Nova Scotia leadership election
- Date: October 27, 2018
- Convention: Halifax Exhibition Centre
- Resigning leader: Jamie Baillie
- Won by: Tim Houston
- Ballots: 1
- Candidates: 5
- Entrance fee: $25,000

The 2018 Progressive Conservative Association of Nova Scotia leadership election took place on October 27, 2018, due to Jamie Baillie's announcement that he was stepping down as leader of the Progressive Conservative Association of Nova Scotia on November 1, 2017. Baillie was to remain in the position until a new leader was elected, however on January 24, 2018, he announced his resignation with immediate effect due to "allegations of inappropriate behaviour".

Unlike the system of delegated conventions previously used, this election was conducted on a One Member One Vote basis, weighted so that each electoral district being allocated 100 points, which were distributed proportionally according to each candidate's level of support.

== Timeline ==
- November 1, 2017 - Jamie Baillie announces his resignation, effective upon the election of a new leader.
- November 19, 2017 - Tim Houston becomes the first candidate to officially enter the race.
- January 8, 2018 - John Lohr announced his bid for the leadership.
- January 24, 2018 - Baillie moves up his resignation, having it take effect immediately; Karla MacFarlane becomes interim leader.
- February 3, 2018 - Cecil Clarke announced his bid for the leadership.
- February 6, 2018 - Elizabeth Smith-McCrossin announced her bid for the leadership.
- February 8, 2018 - Julie Chaisson announced her bid for the leadership.
- August 13, 2018 - Deadline for candidates to submit nomination.
- October 27, 2018 - Leadership convention is held in Halifax.

== Candidates ==
=== Julie Chaisson ===
Background

Candidate of Record in Chester-St. Margaret's (2017)

Date campaign launched: February 8, 2018
Campaign website: www.juliechaisson.ca

- MLAs:
- Former MLAs:
- Federal politicians:
- Municipal politicians:
- Other prominent individuals:

=== Cecil Clarke ===
Background

Mayor of the Cape Breton Regional Municipality (2012–2020), Attorney General of Nova Scotia (2007–2009), Minister of Justice (2007–2009), Speaker of the House of Assembly (2006–2007), Minister of Energy (2003–2006), Minister of Economic Development (2003), MLA for Cape Breton North (2001–2011)

Date campaign launched: February 3, 2018
Campaign website: www.cecilclarke.ca
Supporters

- MLAs: (3) Alfie MacLeod (Sydney River-Mira-Louisbourg 2006–2019, 1995–1998), Eddie Orrell (Northside-Westmount 2011–2019), Keith Bain (Victoria-The Lakes 2017–2024, 2006–2013)
- Former MLAs: (9) Rollie Thornhill (Dartmouth South 1974–1993, Mayor of Dartmouth 1967–1973), Jon Carey (Kings West 1999–2003), Judy Streatch (Chester-St. Margaret's 2005–2009), Brooke Taylor (Colchester-Musquodoboit Valley 1993–2009), Bill Langille (Colchester North 1999–2006), Benoit Robichaud (Yarmouth 1967–1970), Billy Joe MacLean (Inverness South 1981–1988, Mayor of Port Hawkesbury 1994–2016), Ken Streatch (Bedford-Musquodoboit Valley 1978–1993), Peter Christie (Bedford 1999–2006, Mayor of Bedford 1988–1991).
- Federal politicians: (3) MP Lisa Raitt (Milton 2008–2019, Deputy Leader of the Conservative Party of Canada 2017–2019), MP Gerald Keddy (South Shore—St. Margarets 1997–2015), Donald Oliver (Senator for South Shore 1990–2013).
- Municipal politicians: (2) Almon Chisholm (Former Mayor of Port Hawkesbury), Gloria McCluskey (Former Mayor of Dartmouth 1992–1996)
- Other prominent individuals: (5) MPP Lisa MacLeod (Nepean 2006–2025), Irvine Carvery (Candidate in Preston-Dartmouth, 2017), Laurie MacIntosh (Candidate in Sydney-Whitney Pier, 2017), Valerie White (Candidate in Bedford, 2017), Louie Piovesan (Candidate in Cape Breton Centre, 2017).

=== Tim Houston ===
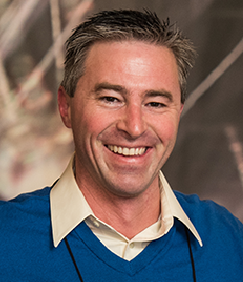
Tim Houston

Background

MLA for Pictou East (2013–Present)

Date campaign launched: November 19, 2017
Campaign website: www.timhouston.ca
Supporters

- MLAs: (7) Pat Dunn (Pictou Centre 2013–2024, 2006–2009), Tim Halman (Dartmouth East 2017–Present), Brad Johns (Sackville-Beaver Bank 2017–Present), Barbara Adams (Cole Harbour-Eastern Passage 2017–Present), Kim Masland (Queens-Shelburne 2017–Present), Larry Harrison (Colchester-Musquodoboit Valley 2013–2024), Allan MacMaster (Inverness, 2009–2024)
- Former MLAs: (5) Neil LeBlanc (Argyle 1998–2003, 1984–1993), John Leefe (Queens 1978–1999, Mayor of Queens Municipality 2000–2012), David Nantes (Cole Harbour 1978–1993), Bruce Holland (Timberlea-Prospect 1993–1998), Guy LeBlanc (Clare 1984–1993)
- Federal politicians: (3) MP Peter MacKay (Central Nova 1997–2015, Deputy Leader of the Conservative Party of Canada 2004–2015), MP Peter McCreath (South Shore 1988–1993), Tom McInnis (Senator for Nova Scotia 2012–2020).
- Other prominent individuals: (16) Patricia Auchnie (Candidate in Eastern Shore, 2017) Norm Cormier (Candidate in Clare-Digby, 2017), John Giannakos (Candidate in Sackville-Cobequid, 2017), Sylvia Gillard (Candidate in Halifax Armdale, 2017), Keltie Jones (Candidate in Truro-Bible Hill-Millbrook-Salmon River, 2017) Paul Kimball (Candidate in Clayton Park West, 2017), Tim Kohoot (Candidate in Timberlea-Prospect, 2017), John A. MacDonald (Candidate in Hants East, 2017), Ray Mattie (Candidate in Antigonish, 2017), Dan McNaughton (Candidate in Waverley-Fall River-Beaver Bank, 2017), Chris Mont (Candidate in Cole Harbour-Portland Valley, 2017), Chris Palmer (Candidate in Kings West, 2017), John White (Candidate in Glace Bay, 2017), Rob Wolf (Candidate in Guysborough-Eastern Shore-Tracadie, 2017), Matthew Donahoe (Candidate in Halifax Needham, 2017), Travis Price (Candidate in Fairview-Clayton Park, 2013)

=== John Lohr ===
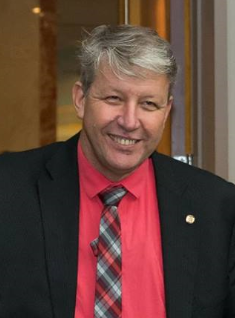
John Lohr

Background

MLA for Kings North (2013–Present)

Date campaign launched: January 8, 2018
Campaign website: www.johnlohr.ca
Supporters

- MLAs:
- Former MLAs: (2) George Archibald (Kings North 1984–1999), David Morse (Kings South 1999–2009),
- Federal politicians: (2) MP Greg Kerr (West Nova 2008–2015, MLA for Annapolis West 1978–1993), Kelvin Ogilvie (Senator for Annapolis Valley-Hants 2009–2017)
- Municipal politicians:
- Other prominent individuals: (5) Brian Pickings (Candidate in Lunenburg, 2013, 2017), Greg Frampton (Candidate in Dartmouth-Cole Harbour, 1999, Cole Harbour-Portland Valley, 2013), Janice Munroe-Dodge (Candidate in Hants West, 2017), Martha MacQuarrie (Candidate in Kings-Hants, 2019), Wanda Webber (Candidate in Dartmouth-Cole Harbour, 2008)

=== Elizabeth Smith-McCrossin ===
Background

MLA for Cumberland North (2017–Present)

Date campaign launched: February 6, 2018
Campaign website: www.elizabethforleader.ca
Supporters

- MLAs:
- Former MLAs: (6) Roger Bacon (Premier 1990–1991, Cumberland East 1970–1993), Mary Ann McGrath (Halifax Clayton Park 1999–2003), Murray Scott (Cumberland South 1998–2010), Joel Matheson (Halifax Bedford Basin 1978–1993), Art Donahoe (Halifax Citadel 1978–1993)
- Federal politicians: (2) MP Scott Armstrong (Cumberland—Colchester 2009–2015), MP George Cooper (Halifax 1979–1980)
- Municipal politicians:
- Other prominent individuals: (2) Rob Batherson (Candidate in Halifax Citadel-Sable Island, 2017), Lloyd Jackson (Candidate in Cole Harbour-Eastern Passage, 2009, 2013)

=== Declined ===
- Barbara Adams – MLA for Cole Harbour-Eastern Passage (2017–Present)
- Keith Bain – MLA for Victoria-The Lakes (2017–2024, 2006–2013)
- Rob Batherson – Candidate in Halifax Citadel-Sable Island (2017)
- Chris d'Entremont – Minister of Finance (2009), Minister of Community Services (2009), Minister of Health (2006–2009), Minister of Acadian Affairs (2003–2009), Minister of Agriculture and Fisheries (2003–2006), MLA for Argyle-Barrington (2003–2019)
- Pat Dunn – MLA for Pictou Centre (2006–2009), (2013–2024)
- Peter MacKay - Minister of Justice (2013–2015), Minister of National Defence (2007–2013), Minister of Foreign Affairs (2006–2007), Minister of the Atlantic Canada Opportunities Agency (2006–2010), MP for Central Nova (2004–2015), Deputy Leader of the Conservative Party of Canada
- Allan MacMaster – MLA for Inverness (2009–2024)
- Tim Halman – MLA for Dartmouth East (2017–Present)
- Brad Johns – MLA for Sackville-Beaver Bank (2017–Present)
- Paul Kimball - Filmmaker, Candidate in Clayton Park West (2017)
- Karla MacFarlane – Leader of the Opposition (2018), Interim Leader of the Progressive Conservative Association of Nova Scotia (2018), MLA for Pictou West (2013–2024)
- Eddie Orrell – MLA for Northside-Westmount (2011–2019)
- Alana Paon – MLA for Cape Breton-Richmond (2017–2021)

== Debates ==
Debates among candidates for the 2018 Progressive Conservative Party of Nova Scotia leadership election
No.	Date	Time	Place	Participants				
P Participant N Non-invitee A Absent invitee O Out of race (exploring or withdrawn)				Tim Houston	Cecil Clarke	John Lohr	Elizabeth Smith-McCrossin	Julie Chaisson
Progressive Conservative Association of Nova Scotia leadership election debates
1	May 24, 2018	7 p.m. AST	NSCC Middleton Campus, Middleton	P	P	P	P	P
2	June 21, 2018	7 p.m. AST	Alderney Landing Theatre, Dartmouth	P	P	P	P	P
3	July 12, 2018	7 p.m. AST	Centre Communautaire de Par-en-bas, Tusket	P	P	P	P	P
4	August 9, 2018	7 p.m. AST	Joan Harriss Cruise Pavilion, Sydney	P	P	P	P	P
5	September 11, 2018	7 p.m. AST	Best Western Plus, Bridgwater	P	P	P	P	P
6	October 10, 2018	7 p.m. AST	Best Western Glengarry, Truro	P	P	P	P	P

== Results ==
	Tim Houston		Cecil Clarke		John Lohr		Elizabeth Smith-McCrossin		Julie Chaisson		Total
Constituency	Votes	Points	Votes	Points	Votes	Points	Votes	Points	Votes	Points	Votes
Annapolis	48	42.86	13	11.61	43	38.39	6	5.36	2	1.79	112
Antigonish	178	70.36	59	23.32	13	5.14	2	0.79	1	0.40	253
Argyle-Barrington	55	57.89	26	27.37	9	9.47	1	1.05	4	4.21	95
Bedford	86	42.36	68	33.50	25	12.32	19	9.36	5	2.46	203
Cape Breton-Richmond	43	27.74	103	66.45	5	3.23	3	1.94	1	0.65	155
Cape Breton Centre	21	16.03	105	80.15	4	3.05	0	0	1	0.76	131
Chester-St. Margaret's	77	44.51	56	32.37	8	4.62	5	2.89	27	15.61	173
Clare-Digby	60	57.69	10	9.62	28	26.92	6	5.77	0	0	104
Clayton Park West	73	53.68	22	16.18	10	7.35	31	22.79	0	0	136
Colchester-Musquodoboit Valley	94	58.75	33	20.63	19	11.88	10	6.25	4	2.50	160
Colchester North	45	29.61	73	48.03	9	5.92	22	14.47	3	1.97	152
Cole Harbour-Eastern Passage	114	69.94	22	13.50	11	6.75	15	9.20	1	0.61	163
Cole Harbour-Portland Valley	67	59.82	23	20.54	14	12.50	7	6.25	1	0.89	112
Cumberland North	18	8.49	11	5.19	3	1.42	179	84.43	1	0.47	212
Cumberland South	131	54.36	23	9.54	11	4.56	75	31.12	1	0.41	241
Dartmouth East	100	68.03	24	16.33	11	7.48	10	6.80	2	1.36	147
Dartmouth North	47	59.49	10	12.66	12	15.19	5	6.33	5	6.33	79
Dartmouth South	66	64.08	14	13.59	11	10.68	9	8.74	3	2.91	103
Eastern Shore	61	66.30	18	19.57	8	8.70	4	4.35	1	1.09	92
Fairview-Clayton Park	62	62.63	10	10.10	14	14.14	11	11.11	2	2.02	99
Glace Bay	139	53.67	119	45.95	1	0.39	0	0	0	0	259
Guysborough–Eastern Shore–Tracadie	73	58.40	40	32.00	10	8.00	2	1.60	0	0	125
Halifax Armdale	48	53.33	16	17.78	9	10.00	15	16.67	2	2.22	90
Halifax Atlantic	37	47.44	18	23.08	10	12.82	4	5.13	9	11.54	78
Halifax Chebucto	58	37.91	61	39.87	7	4.58	20	13.07	7	4.58	153
Halifax Citadel-Sable Island	66	45.21	40	27.40	8	5.48	26	17.81	6	4.11	146
Halifax Needham	58	50.00	36	31.03	10	8.62	11	9.48	1	0.86	116
Hammonds Plains-Lucasville	47	46.08	22	21.57	20	19.61	5	4.90	8	7.84	102
Hants East	30	46.88	11	17.19	17	26.56	3	4.69	3	4.69	64
Hants West	45	51.72	13	14.94	24	27.59	3	3.45	2	2.30	87
Inverness	53	48.18	47	42.73	9	8.18	1	0.91	0	0	110
Kings North	16	6.04	8	3.02	237	89.43	4	1.51	0	0	265
Kings South	40	21.51	14	7.53	126	67.74	4	2.15	2	1.08	186
Kings West	79	47.31	23	13.77	60	35.93	5	2.99	0	0	167
Lunenburg	37	34.58	45	42.06	17	15.89	4	3.74	4	3.74	107
Lunenburg West	31	31.00	53	53.00	11	11.00	5	5.00	0	0	100
Northside-Westmount	62	15.20	339	83.09	4	0.98	2	0.49	1	0.25	408
Pictou Centre	390	73.72	85	16.07	51	9.64	3	0.57	0	0	529
Pictou East	801	87.93	60	6.59	47	5.16	3	0.33	0	0	911
Pictou West	231	73.57	41	13.06	39	12.42	2	0.64	1	0.32	314
Preston-Dartmouth	27	71.05	3	7.89	6	15.79	1	2.63	1	2.63	38
Queens-Shelburne	118	71.95	25	15.24	5	3.05	12	7.32	4	2.44	164
Sackville-Beaver Bank	83	62.88	13	9.85	22	16.67	5	3.79	9	6.82	132
Sackville-Cobequid	65	53.28	8	6.56	13	10.66	4	3.28	32	26.23	122
Sydney-Whitney Pier	31	18.90	124	75.61	8	4.88	0	0	1	0.61	164
Sydney River-Mira-Louisbourg	49	16.07	245	80.33	7	2.30	3	0.98	1	0.33	305
Timberlea-Prospect	67	65.69	12	11.76	11	10.78	12	11.76	0	0	102
Truro-Bible Hill-Millbrook-Salmon River	170	70.25	35	14.46	16	6.61	21	8.68	0	0	242
Victoria-The Lakes	34	18.28	146	78.49	5	2.69	1	0.54	0	0	186
Waverley-Fall River-Beaver Bank	101	57.39	31	17.61	15	8.52	14	7.95	15	8.52	176
Yarmouth	36	46.75	20	25.97	16	20.78	3	3.90	2	2.60	77
Total	4,568	2,496.75	2,476	1,385.71	1,109	692.45	618	384.96	176	140.13	8,947

== Opinion polls ==
Polling firm/Link	Last date of polling	Sample size	Margin of error	Julie Chaisson	Cecil Clarke	Tim Houston	John Lohr	Elizabeth Smith-McCrossin	None of the above	Don't know/no answer
Corporate Research Associates	September 1, 2018	400	± 4.9%	10%	19%	9%	4%	6%	18%	32%
Corporate Research Associates	May 23, 2018	400	± 4.9%	13%	23%	11%	4%	4%	10%	34%
Corporate Research Associates	February 1, 2018	400	± 4.9%		26%	10%	5%	11%	8%	40%
