= 2007 Nova Scotia Liberal Party leadership election =

Yukon Party leadership election

- April 27, 2007
- Turnout: 1,397
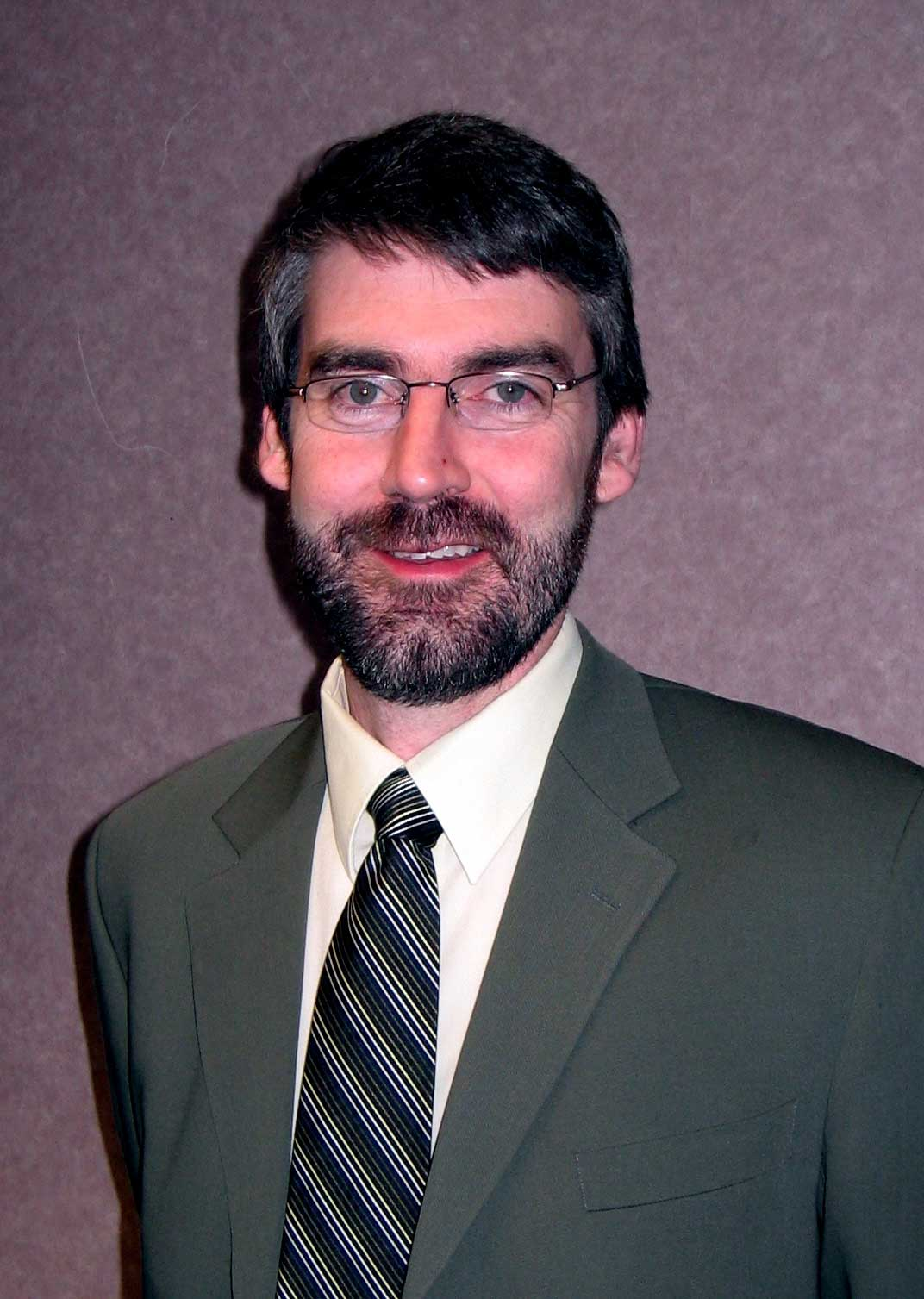

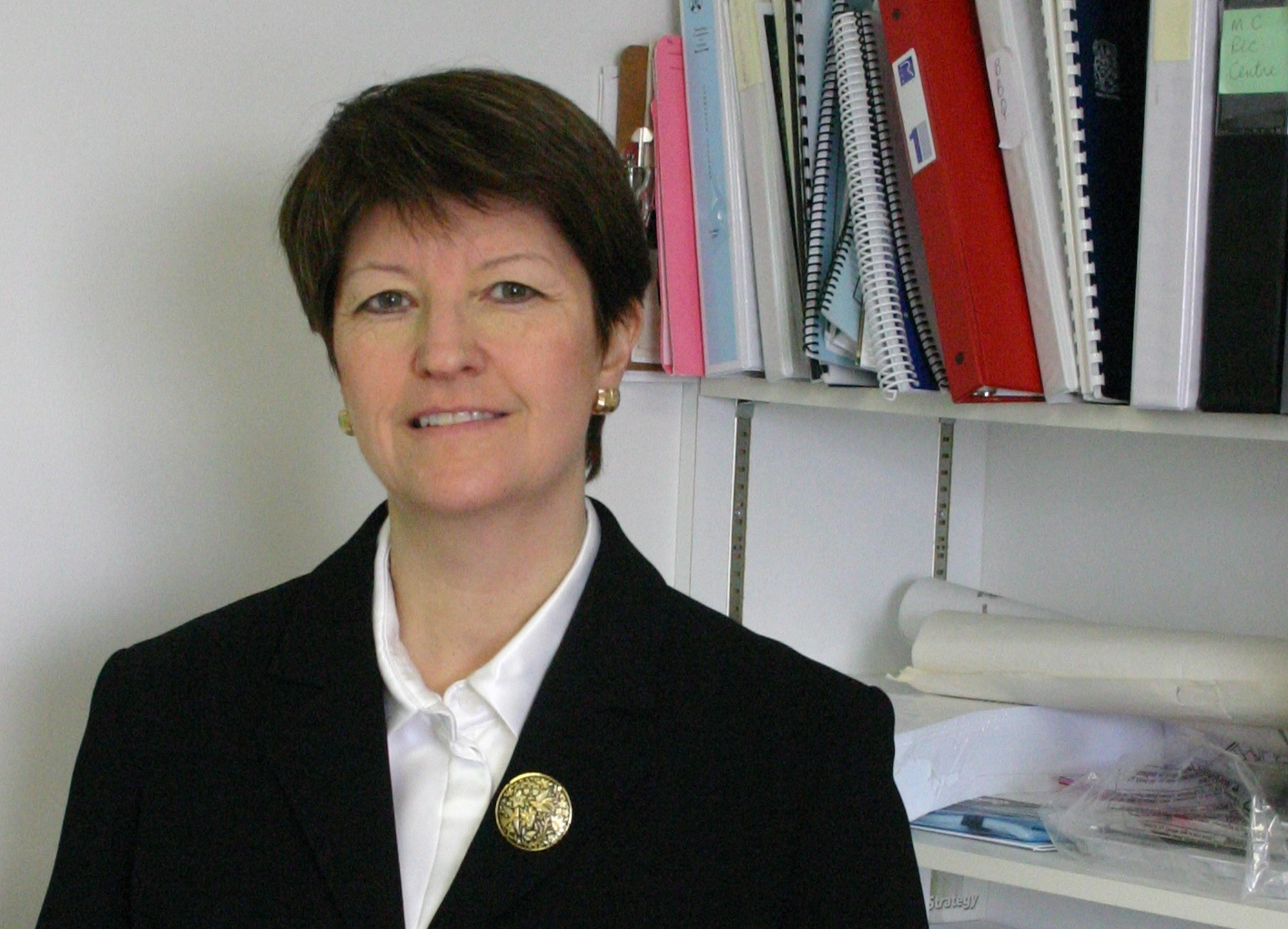

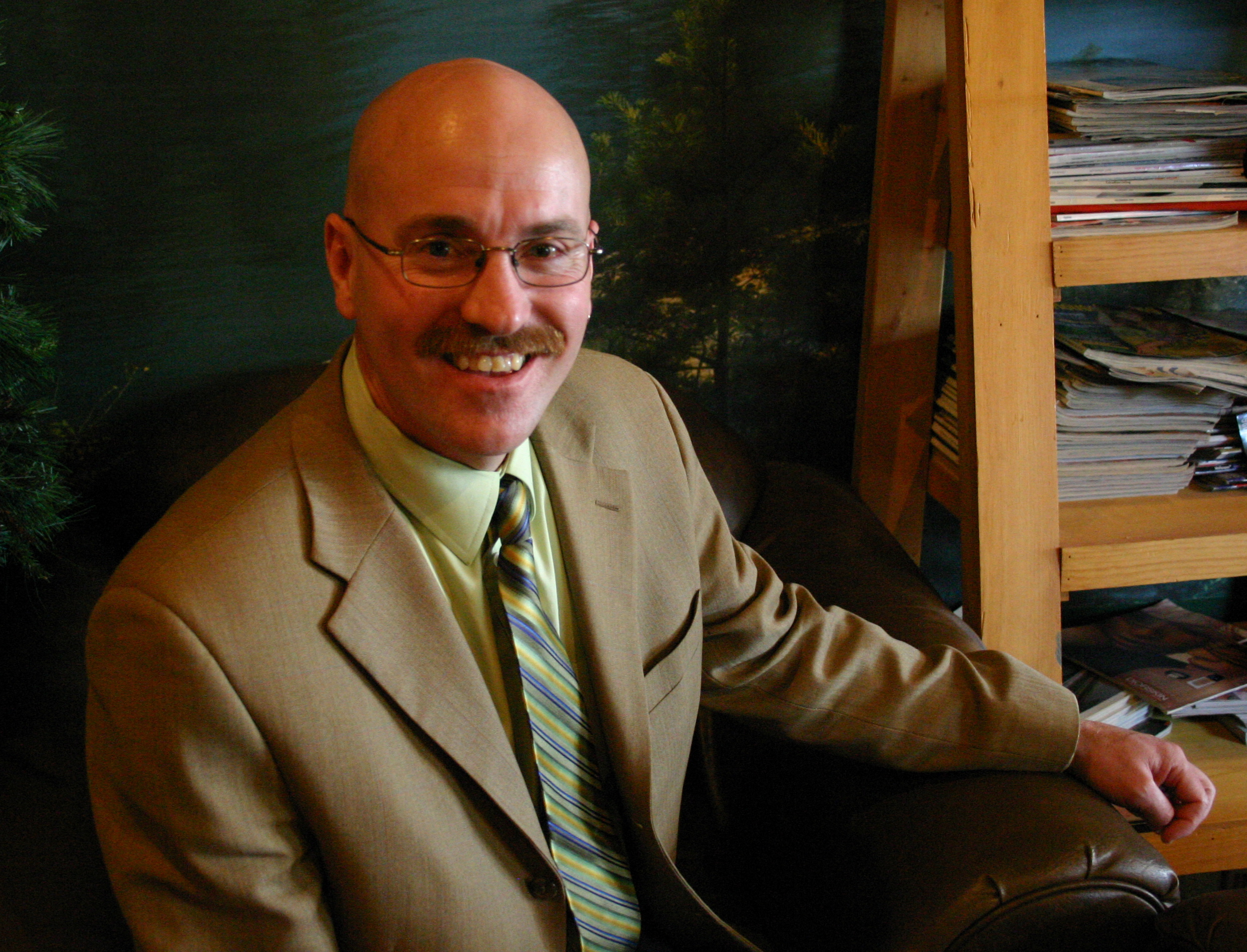

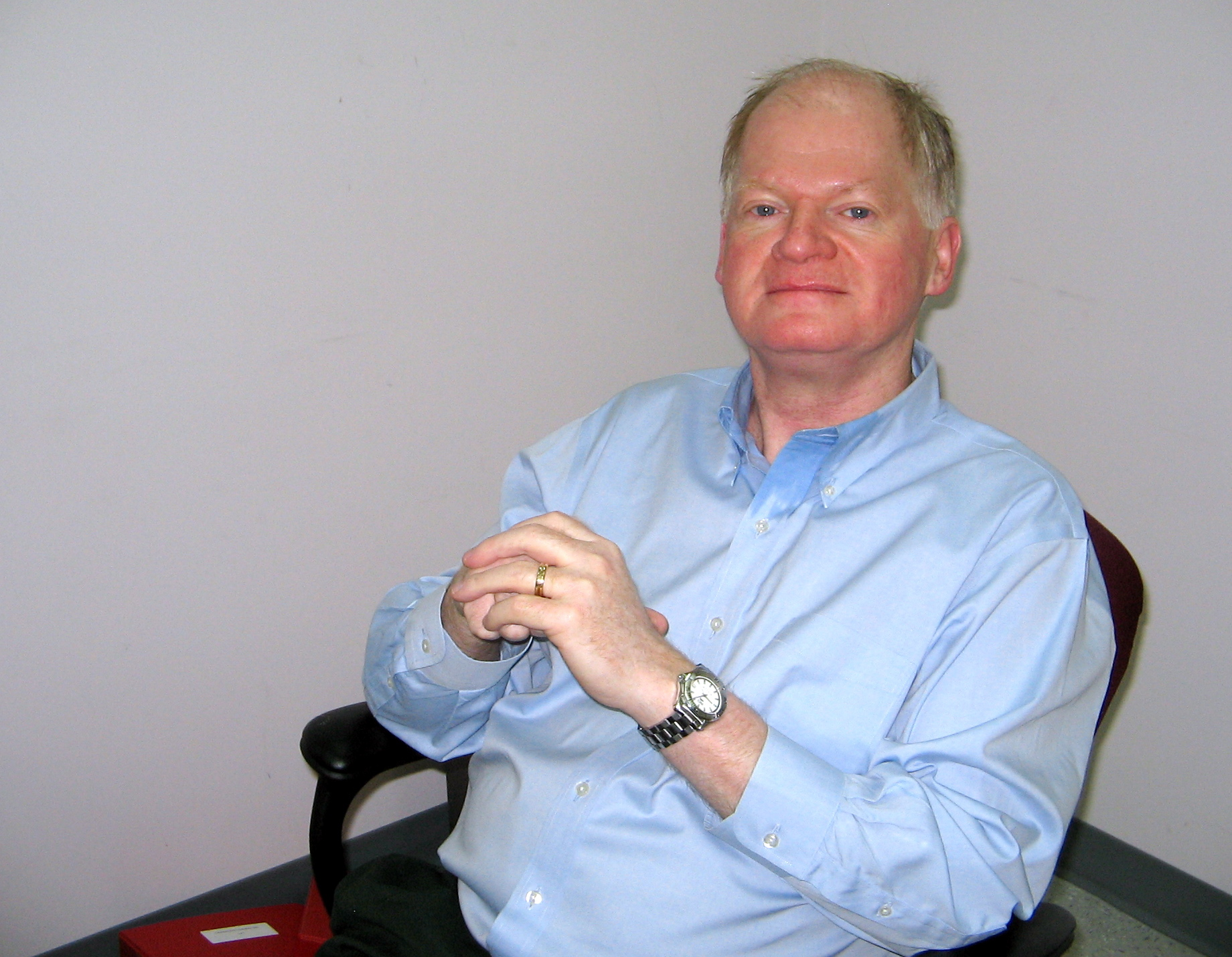
Candidate	Stephen McNeil	Diana Whalen
Riding	Annapolis	Halifax-Clayton Park
Second ballot	718 (52.5%)	650 (47.5%)
First ballot	571 (40.9%)	402 (28.8%)
Candidate	Mike Smith	Kenzie MacKinnon
Riding	N/A (Note: Mayor of Colchester County.)	N/A (Note: Former candidate in Halifax Chebucto.)
Second ballot	Withdrew	Eliminated
First ballot	255 (18.3%)	169 (12.1%)
Leader before election
Michel Samson (interim)
Elected Leader
Stephen McNeil

2007 Nova Scotia Liberal Party leadership election
- Date: April 27, 2007
- Convention: Dartmouth Sportsplex, Dartmouth
- Resigning leader: Francis MacKenzie
- Won by: Stephen McNeil
- Ballots: 1,397

The 2007 Nova Scotia Liberal Party leadership election was held on April 27, 2007 at the Dartmouth Sportsplex, following the resignation of Francis MacKenzie, shortly after failing to win a seat in the 2006 election. This was the third leadership convention for the Liberals since 2002. In addition to the leadership convention, the party will hold its Annual General Meeting including the election of officers, adoption of policies, and potential constitutional amendments. It was won by Annapolis MLA Stephen McNeil.

The party had held government for much of the province's history, having been in power from Canadian Confederation in 1867 to 1878, 1882 to 1925, 1933 to 1956, 1970 to 1978, and 1993 to 1999. However, the party had been relegated to third party status after it lost the 1999 election.

== Timeline ==
=== 2006 ===
- June 20: Michel Samson is selected as interim leader.

=== 2007 ===
- January 10: Mike Smith, the mayor of Colchester County, becomes the first registered candidate, launching his campaign in Truro.
- January 12: Interim leader Michel Samson announces that he will not run for party leadership.
- January 18: Halifax-Clayton Park MLA Diana Whalen becomes the second and highest profile candidate in the race, launching her campaign in Halifax.
- January 19: Kenzie MacKinnon announces that he will enter the leadership race.
- January 30: Annapolis MLA Stephen McNeil becomes the second MLA to enter the race; he is the first to have endorsements from current MLAs.
- April 28: Stephen McNeil elected leader.

== Rules ==
The new leader was chosen by a full delegated convention, the first in the party since 1986. The leader was elected using a one member, one vote system, which has been used since 1992. The party issued a 78 page document, outlining the rules, on January 15, 2007.

== Candidates ==
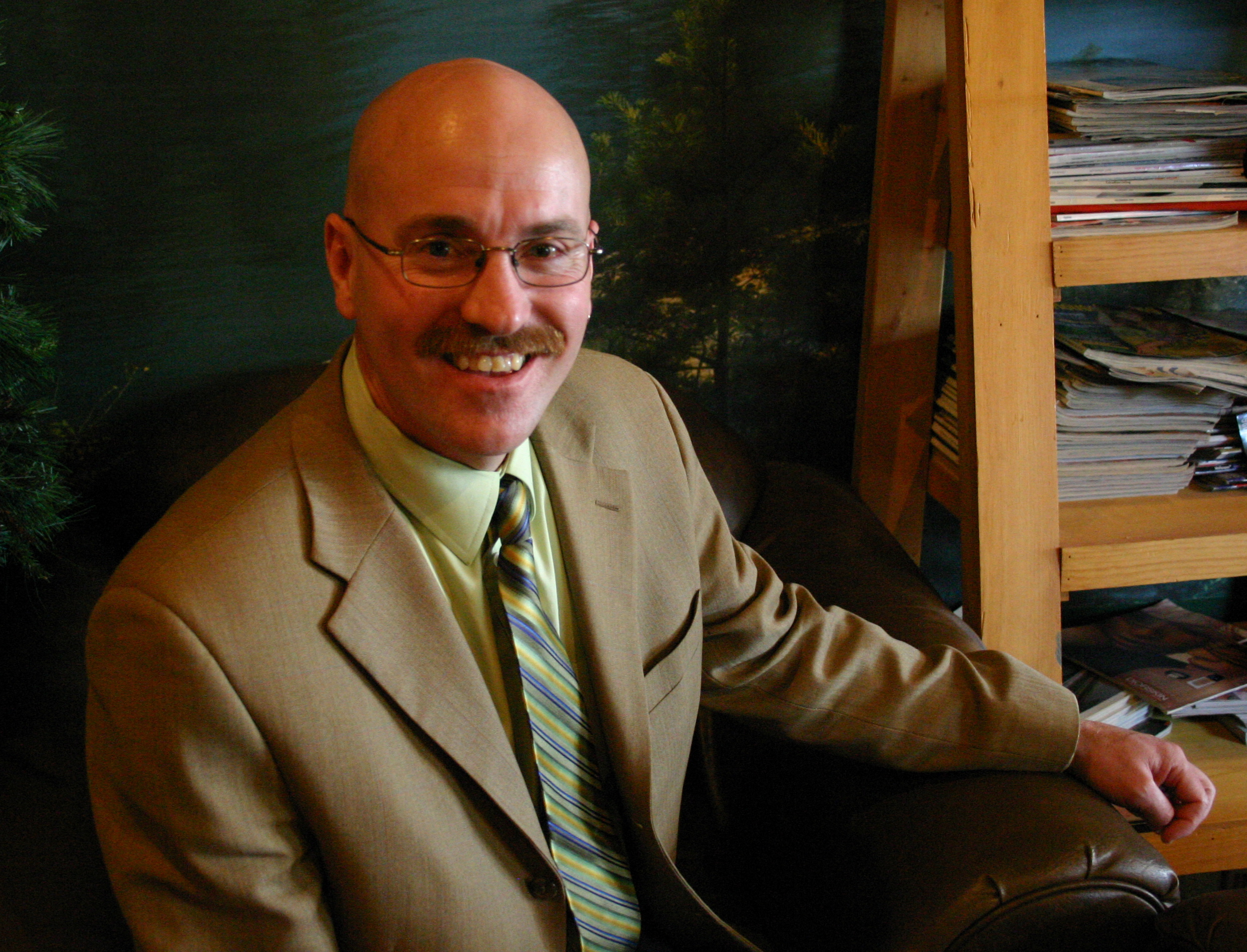
Mike Smith

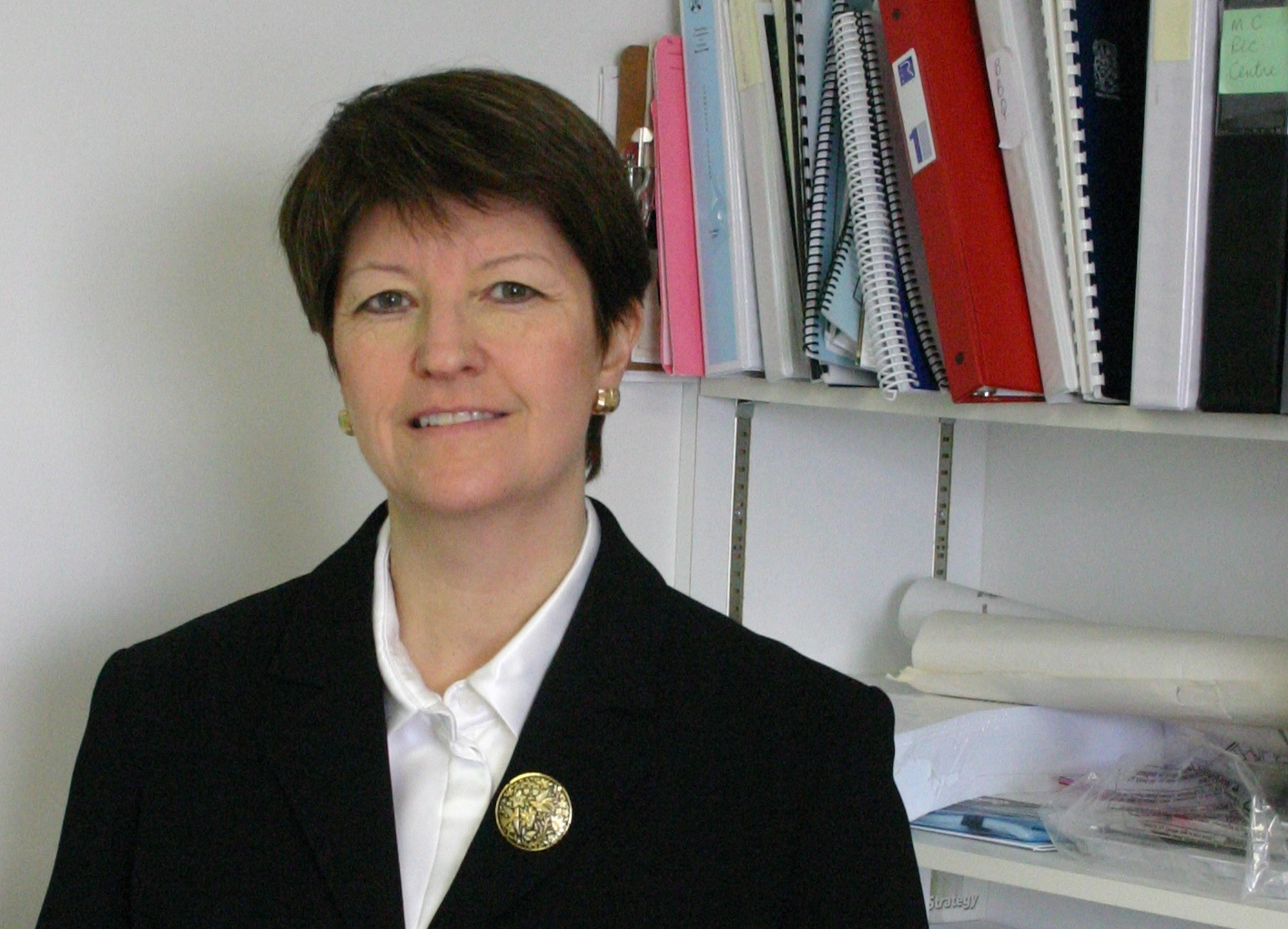
Diana Whalen

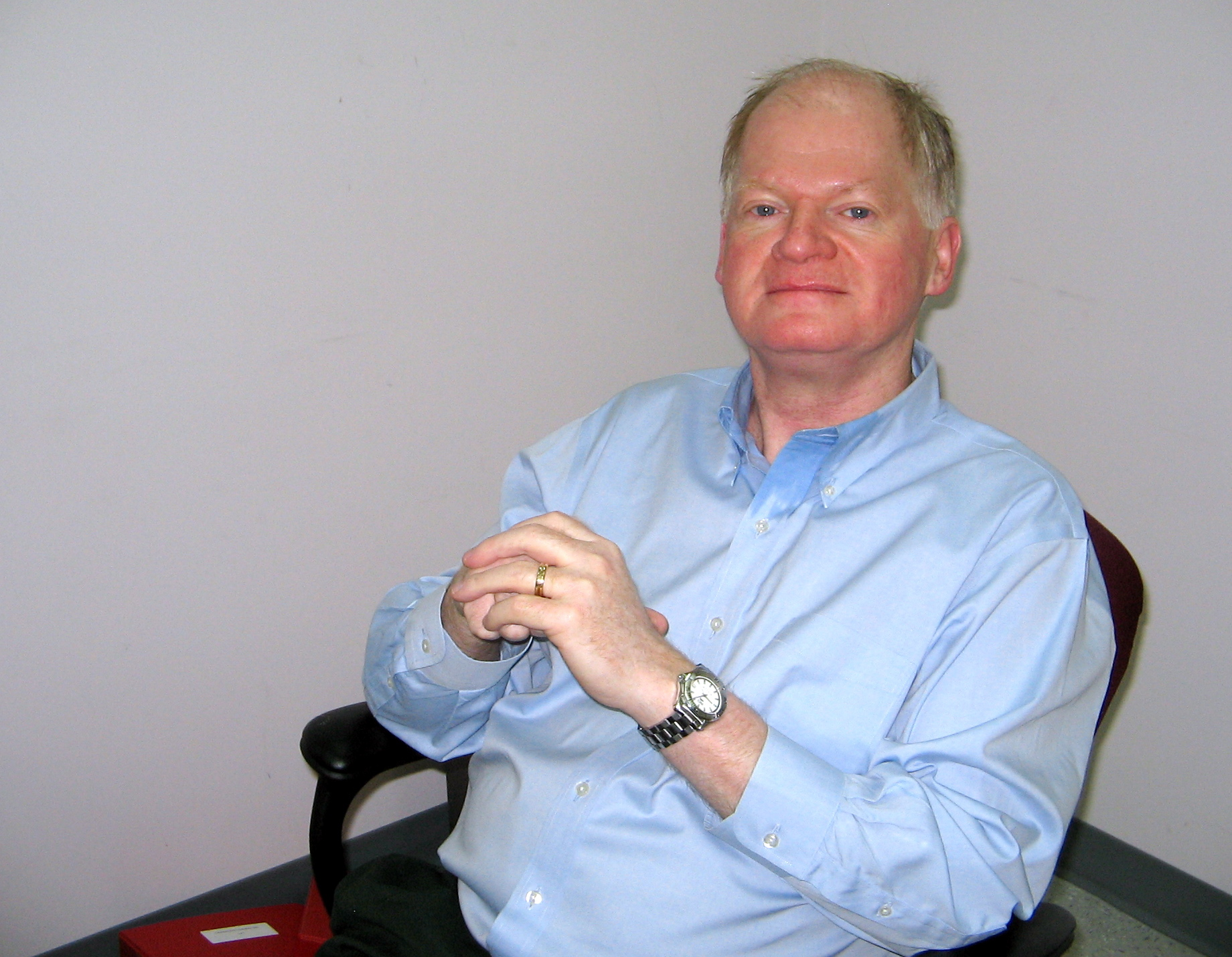
Kenzie McKinnon

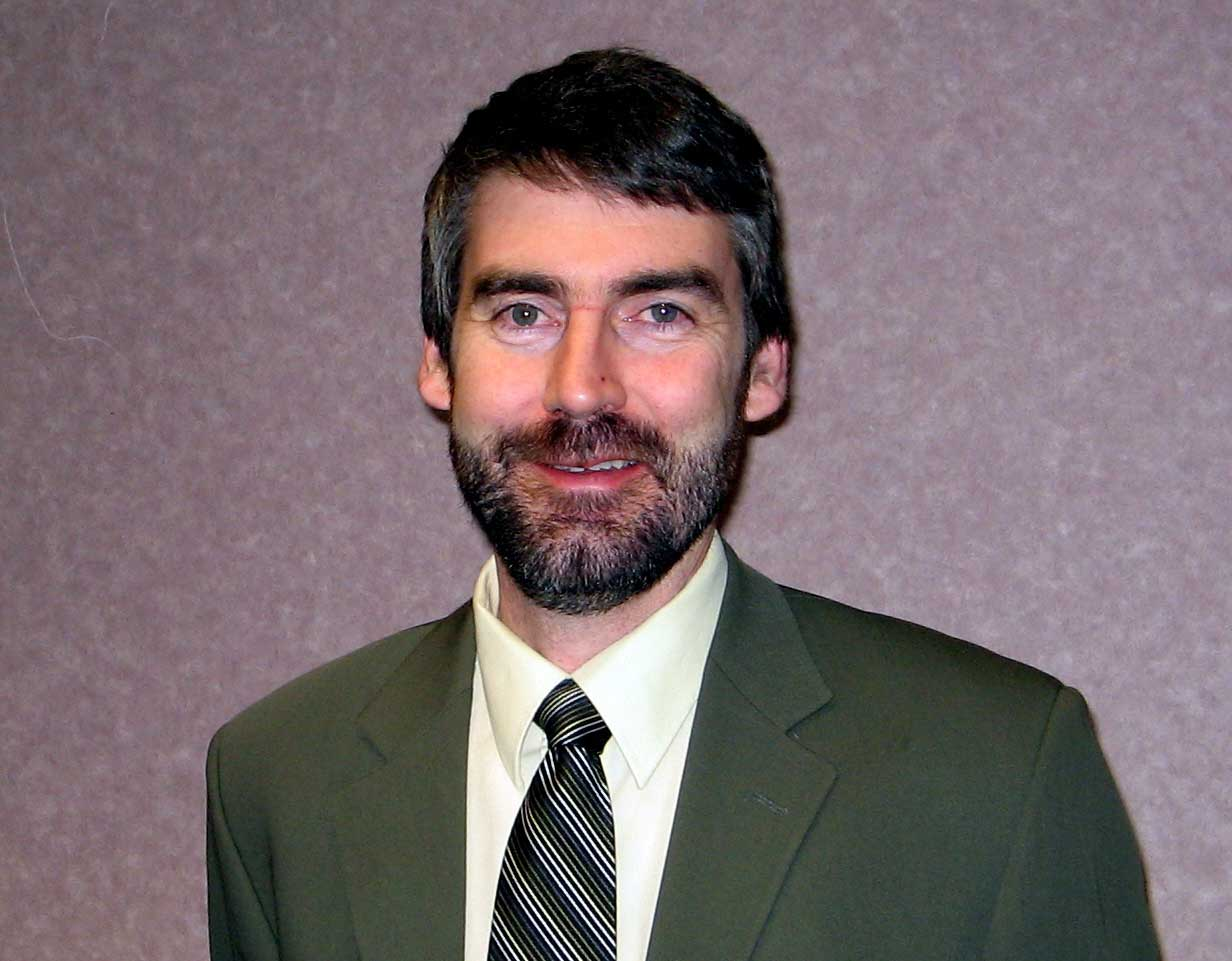
Stephen McNeil

- Kenzie MacKinnon, lawyer and three-time Liberal candidate
- Stephen McNeil, MLA for Annapolis
- Mike Smith, mayor of Colchester County
- Diana Whalen, MLA for Halifax-Clayton Park

Various members of the party announced that they would not seek the leadership. Among them were interim leader Michel Samson, Dartmouth physician John Gillis, and Liberal MPs Geoff Regan, Scott Brison, and Michael Savage.

=== Endorsements ===
The following is a list of high-profile endorsers for each of the candidates; the list includes MLAs, MPs, and Senators, as well as former MLAs, Premiers, and Lieutenant-Governors.

==== MacKinnon (3) ====
- Mary Clancy, former MP for Halifax
- Allan J. MacEachen, former MP and Deputy Prime Minister
- Russell MacLellan, former Premier of Nova Scotia

==== McNeil (9) ====
- Jim Cowan, Senator
- Kirk Cox, former candidate, Shelburne
- Rodger Cuzner, Liberal MP for Cape Breton—Canso
- Don Downe, former MLA, Lunenburg West
- Wayne Gaudet, MLA for Clare
- Leo Glavine, MLA for Kings West
- Jim Smith, former MLA, Dartmouth East
- Harold Theriault, MLA for Digby-Annapolis
- Robert Thibault, Liberal MP for West Nova

==== Smith (13) ====
- Aldric d'Entremont, Warden, Municipality of Argyle
- Lloyd Hines, Warden, Municipality of the District of Guysborough
- Glenn Horne, President, St. F.X. Young Liberals
- Dennis James, former President NS Young Liberals, Chief of Staff to Premier John Savage, Former Federal Candidate
- Ed Kinley, former MLA for Halifax Citadel
- Ed Lorraine, former MLA and provincial Minister of Agriculture
- Kennie MacAskill, former MLA and provincial Minister of Natural Resources
- Richie Mann, President of Dartmouth Cole Harbour, former MLA, former Minister of Transportation, Tourism, and Economic Development
- Duart McAuley, Warden, Municipality of the County of Inverness
- Traci-Lyn McMenamon, VP Hants East Liberal Association
- Eleanor Norrie, former MLA Truro-Bible Hill, former Minister of Natural Resources, Housing and Consumer Affairs, and Status of Women
- Lorraine Sheppard, Cape Breton South, past member of the Nova Scotia Liberal Party Management Committee
- Gordon Thompson, President, Yarmouth Liberal Association
- Floyd Tucker, former MLA for Colchester North

==== Whalen (9) ====
- Alan Abraham, former Lieutenant Governor of Nova Scotia
- Wayne Adams, former Liberal MLA
- Carolyn Bennett, Liberal MP for Toronto riding of St. Paul's
- Bernie Boudreau, former MLA and Senator
- Scott Brison, Liberal MP for Kings—Hants
- Garnet Brown, former Liberal MLA
- Keith Colwell, MLA for Preston
- Jane Cordy, Senator
- Geoff Regan, Liberal MP for Halifax West
- Dave Wilson, MLA for Glace Bay

==== Caucus members who did not endorse a candidate ====
- Manning MacDonald, MLA for Cape Breton South
- Michel Samson, MLA for Richmond, was the interim leader and remained neutral in the leadership race.

== Results ==
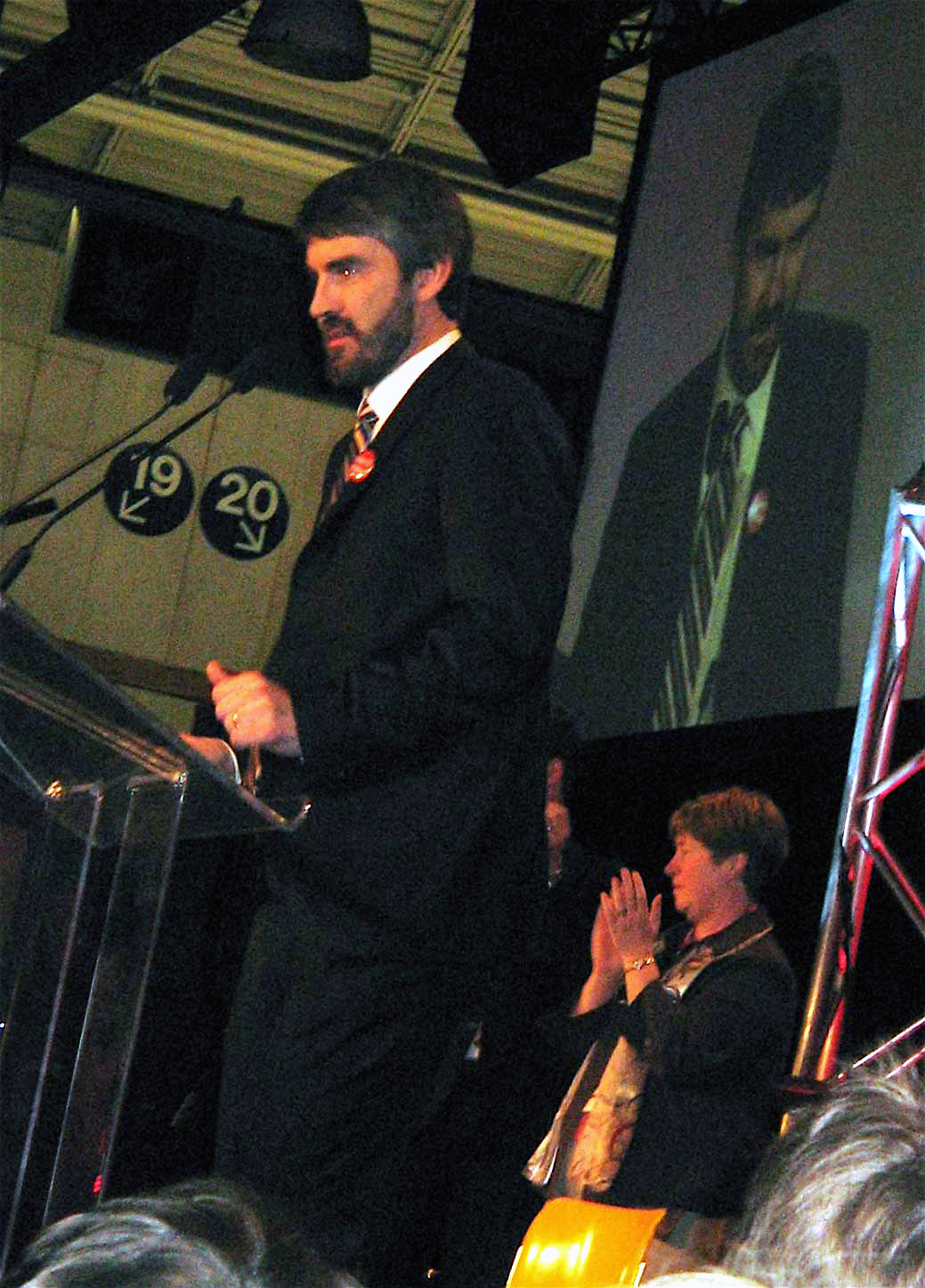
McNeil makes his acceptance speech Saturday, at the Dartmouth Sportplex, after winning on the second ballot.

Results by ballot
Candidate	1st ballot		2nd ballot	
Candidate	Votes cast	%	Votes cast	%
Stephen McNeil	571	40.9%	718	52.5%
Diana Whalen	402	28.8%	650	47.5%
Mike Smith	255	18.3%	Withdrew (Endorsed Whalen)	
Kenzie MacKinnon	169	12.1%	Eliminated (Endorsed Whalen)	
Total	1,397	100.0%	1,368	100.0%

== See also ==
- Leadership convention for more information about the selection of party leaders in Canada.
