= Mike Smith (Nova Scotia politician) =

Former mayor of Colchester County, Nova Scotia

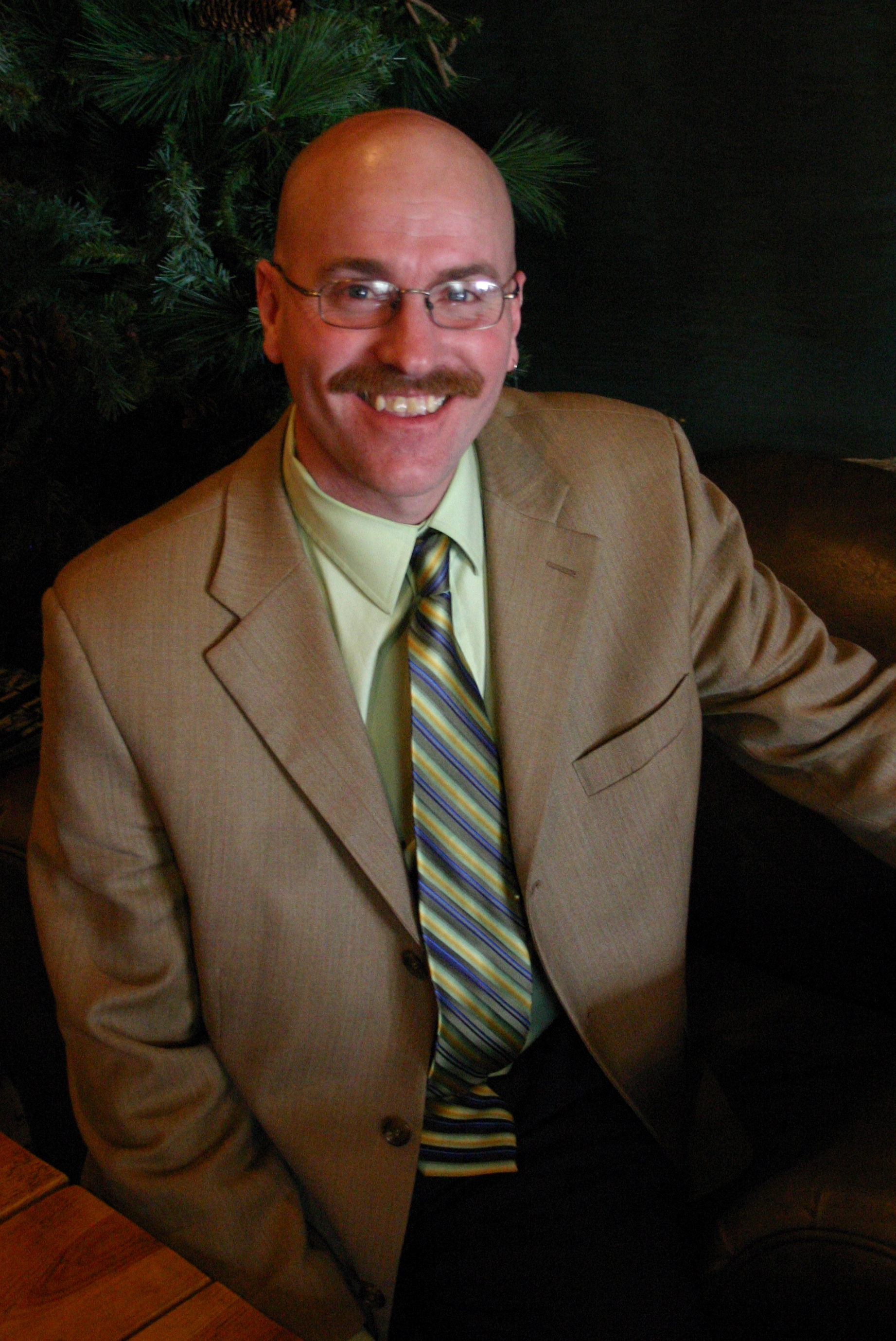
- Smith in 2007

Mayor of Colchester County, Nova Scotia
- Succeeded by: Bob Taylor

Personal details
- Born: North River, Nova Scotia
- Party: Liberal
- Occupation: Politician

Mike Smith is a former mayor of Colchester County, Nova Scotia, Canada.

== Early life ==
Smith was born in North River, Nova Scotia.

== Political career ==
In 1994, Smith was elected as a Colchester County councillor. Re-elected in 1997, he became Colchester County's last Warden during his second term. In 2000, Smith was elected as the county's first mayor. He was re-elected in 2004.

One of Smith's accomplishments as mayor has been the Mayor's Challenge. The Mayor's Challenge is a fitness program aimed at inactive children but has also attracted the interest of adults.

He was a candidate for the leadership of the Nova Scotia Liberal Party in 2007. He placed third of four candidates on the first ballot. He dropped out and endorsed Diana Whalen, who lost on the second and final ballot to Stephen McNeil.

In August 2007 Smith agreed to a request from Truro Pride to fly a flag celebrating gay pride in front of the administrative offices. Colchester County's offices are "just down the road" from Truro, Nova Scotia's City Hall, where Truro council had turned down a similar request 6 to 1, and Truro's mayor Bill Mills had explained his decision on biblical grounds. Smith, on the other hand, agreed to the request, without hesitation. Smith attended the flag raising, and attended a rally supporting Gay rights in Truro's Victoria Park. CTV News characterized Truro's council as old-fashioned:

It makes us look bad. These conversations were going on 15 to 20 years ago -- I thought we were way past worrying about the flying of pride flags or gay rights parades.

Smith did not run again for mayor in the 2008 municipal election. He also declined to run in the 2009 provincial election in Colchester North, as had been widely expected.

In 2011 Smith was extensively quoted about his decision to resign from the Liberal Party after he learned that Karen Casey, formerly a member of the rival Progressive Conservative Party, had crossed the floor, and been accepted into the Liberal Party caucus. Smith told the Truro Daily News he was "startled" to learn Casey was now a Liberal because she was "so partisan". Smith described being disturbed by Casey's "old school of throwing money hell, west and crooked to pander after votes"

== Personal life ==
Smith is married and has three children.
