= Tom Taggart (Canadian politician) =

Canadian politician

Tom Taggart MLA

Member of the Nova Scotia House of Assembly for Colchester North
- Incumbent
- Assumed office August 17, 2021
- Preceded by: Karen Casey

Personal details
- Party: Progressive Conservative

Tom Taggart is a Canadian politician who was elected to the Nova Scotia House of Assembly in the 2021 Nova Scotia general election. He represents the riding of Colchester North as a member of the Progressive Conservative Association of Nova Scotia.

Before his election to the legislature, Taggart served on the Colchester County council. He previously ran in Colchester North in the 1993 Nova Scotia general election, losing to Ed Lorraine.

== Electoral record ==
2021 Nova Scotia general election: Colchester North
Party	Candidate	Votes	%	±%	Expenditures
Progressive Conservative	Tom Taggart	4,477	53.18	+12.14	$44,631.58
Liberal	Merlyn Smith	2,681	31.84	-14.65	$91,526.85
New Democratic	Sean Foley	955	11.34	-1.13	$36,616.11
Green	Ivan Drouin	252	2.99		$1,794.39
Atlantica	Stephan Sante	54	0.64		$200.00
Total valid votes/expense limit		8,419	99.67	+0.19	$86,863.25
Total rejected ballots		28	0.33	-0.19	
Turnout		8,447	56.67	+2.10	
Eligible voters		14,906			
Progressive Conservative gain from Liberal		Swing		+13.40	
Source: Elections Nova Scotia
