= Final Events =

2010 book by Nick Redfern

Final Events: Demonic UFOs, Alien Abductions, the Government, and the Afterlife
- Author: Nick Redfern
- Cover artist: Crystal Hollis
- Language: English
- Published: 2010
- Publication place: US
- Media type: Print
- Pages: 266
- ISBN: 1938398114

Final Events: Demonic UFOs, Alien Abductions, the Government, and the Afterlife is a 2010 pseudohistory book by Nick Redfern. The book originated tales of the "Collins Elite", an alleged group of US high-level policymakers who believe UFOs are demonic rather than extraterrestrial. In the text, the author states explicitly that the contents are not demonstrably factual.

In 2014, scholar of conspiracy theories Aaron John Gulyas devoted a chapter titled "Space Demons" to Redfern's Final Events. Despite its origin in a work of hearsay, the term "Collins Elite" would go on to be incorporated into both popular culture and UFO conspiracy folklore.

== Background ==
Final Events draws upon UFO conspiracy theories about Jack Parsons, an American rocket propulsion researcher at the California Institute of Technology. Parsons was a leader in the development of solid-fueled rockets. Parsons was a founder of the Jet Propulsion Laboratory and the Aerojet Engineering Corporation. Parsons was an avid occultist and follower of British magician Aleister Crowley.

Final Events was not the first to suggest a link between Parsons and UFOs. Crowleyite Kenneth Grant pointed to Parson's "Babalon Working" occult ritual "just prior to the wave of unexplained aerial phenomena now recalled as the 'Great Flying Saucer Flap.'" Grant argued "Parsons opened a door and something flew in." Occult author Francis X. King opines that Parsons felt flying saucers "would play a part in converting the world to Crowleyanity." Parson's former partner, Marjorie Cameron, became obsessed with flying saucers which she interpreted as the result of "elemental powers." Discordian author "Adam GoRightly" similarly connected UFOs to Parson's occult rituals.

== Plot ==
I cannot tell how the truth may be;
I say the tale as ‘twas said to me

— Walter Scott,
as quoted in Final Events (2010)

According to the framing story, in 1991, Anglican Priest and leading UFOlogist Ray Boeche is contacted by two Christians physicists from the Department of Defense who reveal a government program to contact "nonhuman entities". According to their story, the physicists had become convinced the entities were demonic and should not be communicated with. According to the book, author Nick Redfern learns of the collaboration and makes inquiries with the Air Force; he is contacted by a man in his 80s, identifying himself as "Richard Duke", who claims to be a former member of the CIA and "the last surviving member of the original Collins Elite".

Redfern dedicates the rest of the book to conveying Duke's narrative but is careful never to vouch for its historicity; Redfern quotes poet Walter Scott: "I cannot tell how the truth may be; I say the tale as ‘twas said to me".

=== Narrative ===
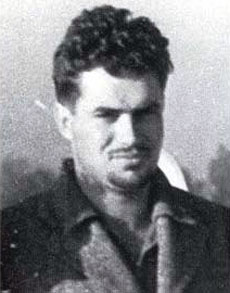
Jack Parsons, rocket engineer and occultist, in 1941

In response to the 1947 flying disc craze, rocket engineer Jack Parsons is questioned by Air Force Office of Special Investigations. Parsons, a disciple of British occultist Aleister Crowley, offers the explanation that occult rituals he conducted in the summer of 1947 had "opened the door" for the flying discs to enter our realm.

In 1950, Parsons is reported to the FBI for having illegally removed classified documents from the Hughes Aircraft Company. Parsons confesses to having removed the documents, returns them, and claims he was going to use the documents to obtain employment in Israel. Parsons is placed under surveillance and Parson's top secret clearance is revoked on January 7, 1952. In response to the loss of his security clearance, Parsons plans to leave the country and relocate to Israel. According to the narrative, the personnel involved in handling the Parsons matter served as the nucleus for a group that would later become the "Collin Elite". Duke recalls: "the thing that connected everyone was we were all on the investigation of Parsons taking the papers from Hughes." On June 17, the day before his departure, Parsons is killed at his home in an explosion that is later ruled accidental.

In the weeks after Parsons is killed, Washington, D.C. experiences a massive wave of UFO sightings and there is "a sudden upsurge in UFO activity across the United States — the likes of which had never, ever been seen before". While mainstream elements in the military assume the UFOs are the result of extraterrestrial visitors, many in the Collins Elite become convinced the wave is the result of Parson's death. According to the text, "no more than about a week after Parsons got killed", about 15 people who had been involved in the Parsons case are invited to fly to attend a meeting at the Pentagon. There, they receive an offer to relocate with families to D.C. in order to conduct a study on whether flying disks "had devil beginnings". The group is kept secret from lawmakers, as Pentagon officials "knew the hammer was going to come down on all this if Congress found out good U.S. dollars were being used to pay for [a study of] demonology and flying saucers." The term "Collins" stems from a participant who came from Collins, New York.

Contactees revealed to be occultists

According to the text, in the 1953, contactee George Adamski and writer Desmond Leslie publish Flying Saucers Have Landed which relays that our "space brothers" are concerned about nuclear bomb tests, while 1954, Adamski's associate George Hunt Williamson details alleged short-wave radio communications with friendly saucer pilot named "Affa". After it is revealed that Leslie is an occultist and Williamson used an ouija board, the team concludes that the contactee movement is occult, not extraterrestrial, in nature.

According to the text, in 1954, housewife Frances Swan begins receiving messages via automatic writing from "Affa", who was mentioned in Williamson's ouija board session. Instructed by "Affa" to contact the Navy, she reaches out to her next door neighbor, Admiral Herbert Knowles, requesting his assistance in sending a message to the Secretary of Defense. The Collins Elite interpret these events as satanic campaign to attempting to influence US policymakers, concluding that Swan was specifically "chosen by demonic forces who carefully anticipated she would contact [Admiral] Knowles". On July 9, 1959, members of the Collins Elite are further disturbed to learn that a member of Naval Intelligence has used Swan's automatic writing techniques to successfully summon a flying saucer.

== Reception ==
Christian scholar and minister Michael S. Heiser reviewed the book, noting its lack of credibility and dismissing its "Cartoonish Demonology". Heiser concludes by arguing: "the Collins Elite, if it is real and if it is made up of Christians, could simply be a bunch of witless dupes". Gulyas likened Final Events to the 1997 UFO writings of evangelical pastor Bob Larson and his concept of spiritual warfare.

By 2021, it was reported that elements within UFOlogy believed an "organized cabal in the Pentagon actively suppressed UFO work because it feared UFOs were demons and that researching them might provoke Satan." UFO disclosure advocate Luis Elizondo has claimed that a faction of US government insiders called the "Collins Elite" opposed research into UFOs on the grounds that they were demonic—a claim that first appeared in Final Events. Skeptical author Jason Colavito writes: "Elizondo depicts the Pentagon as a department riven top to bottom with unstable people who believe they are spiritual warriors holding back the tide of a literal demon invasion. It’s all very confusing if you aren’t part of the insular UFO community for whom the Collins Elite and the Invisible College are as familiar as SEAL Team Six."

== See also ==
- Majestic 12
