= Herbert Knowles =

Herbert Knowles may refer to:

- Herbert Knowles (poet) (1798–1817), English poet
- Herbert Bain Knowles (1894–1975), United States Navy officer

== See also ==
- Herbert Knowles Morrison (1854–1885) was an American entomologist
