= Gerry Fogarty =

Canadian politician

Speaker of the Nova Scotia House of Assembly
- In office November 20, 1997 – May 21, 1998
- Preceded by: Wayne Gaudet
- Succeeded by: Ronald Russell

MLA for Halifax Bedford Basin
- In office May 25, 1993 – July 27, 1999
- Preceded by: Joel Matheson
- Succeeded by: Mary Ann McGrath

Personal details
- Born: Gerald Fogarty
- Party: Liberal
- Occupation: broadcaster

Gerald "Gerry" Fogarty is a former sportscaster and politician. He was the last Speaker of the House of Assembly of Nova Scotia to be appointed by the Premier rather than elected by his peers.

== Before politics ==
Fogarty was a Halifax, Nova Scotia based sportscaster for the CBC Radio in the 1970s and 1980s and was known nationally for his on-air role during international hockey broadcasts carried on CBC.

== Political career ==
He was elected to the Nova Scotia House of Assembly representing Halifax Bedford Basin as a Liberal in the 1993 provincial election and was appointed chairman of the legislature's community services committee which studied the introduction of casinos to the province. In 1997, Fogarty was appointed Speaker of the House of Assembly of Nova Scotia.

He was re-elected in the 1998 provincial election. The election resulted in a minority government with the Liberals and NDP both winning 19 seats and the Progressive Conservatives winning 14. The choice of Speaker became a contentious issue with Liberal Premier Russell MacLellan supporting Fogarty to continue in the position while the Opposition parties demanded that the Speaker be elected by the legislature rather than appointed by the Premier which had been the practice until then. The Liberals agreed to an election and the opposition Progressive Conservatives and New Democrats combined to defeat Fogarty and elect Conservative MLA Ron Russell as the new Speaker. Fogarty was also defeated in his attempt to win the position of Deputy Speaker by NDP MLA Don Chard.

The government was defeated within a year and Fogarty did not re-offer in the 1999 provincial election.
