= Jack Coupar =

Canadian politician

MLA for Colchester North
- In office 1984–1988
- Preceded by: Ed Lorraine
- Succeeded by: Ed Lorraine

Personal details
- Party: Progressive Conservative

John (Jack) Allen Coupar is a Canadian politician. He represented the electoral district of Colchester North in the Nova Scotia House of Assembly from 1984 to 1988. He was a member of the Progressive Conservative Party of Nova Scotia.

Coupar entered provincial politics in the 1984 election, defeating Liberal incumbent Ed Lorraine by 160 votes in Colchester North. Coupar was defeated when he ran for re-election in 1988, losing to Lorraine by 163 votes. In the 1993 election, Coupar ran in the Truro-Bible Hill riding, but was defeated by Liberal Eleanor Norrie by 187 votes.
