= Diana Whalen =

Canadian politician

The Honourable Diana Whalen ECNS
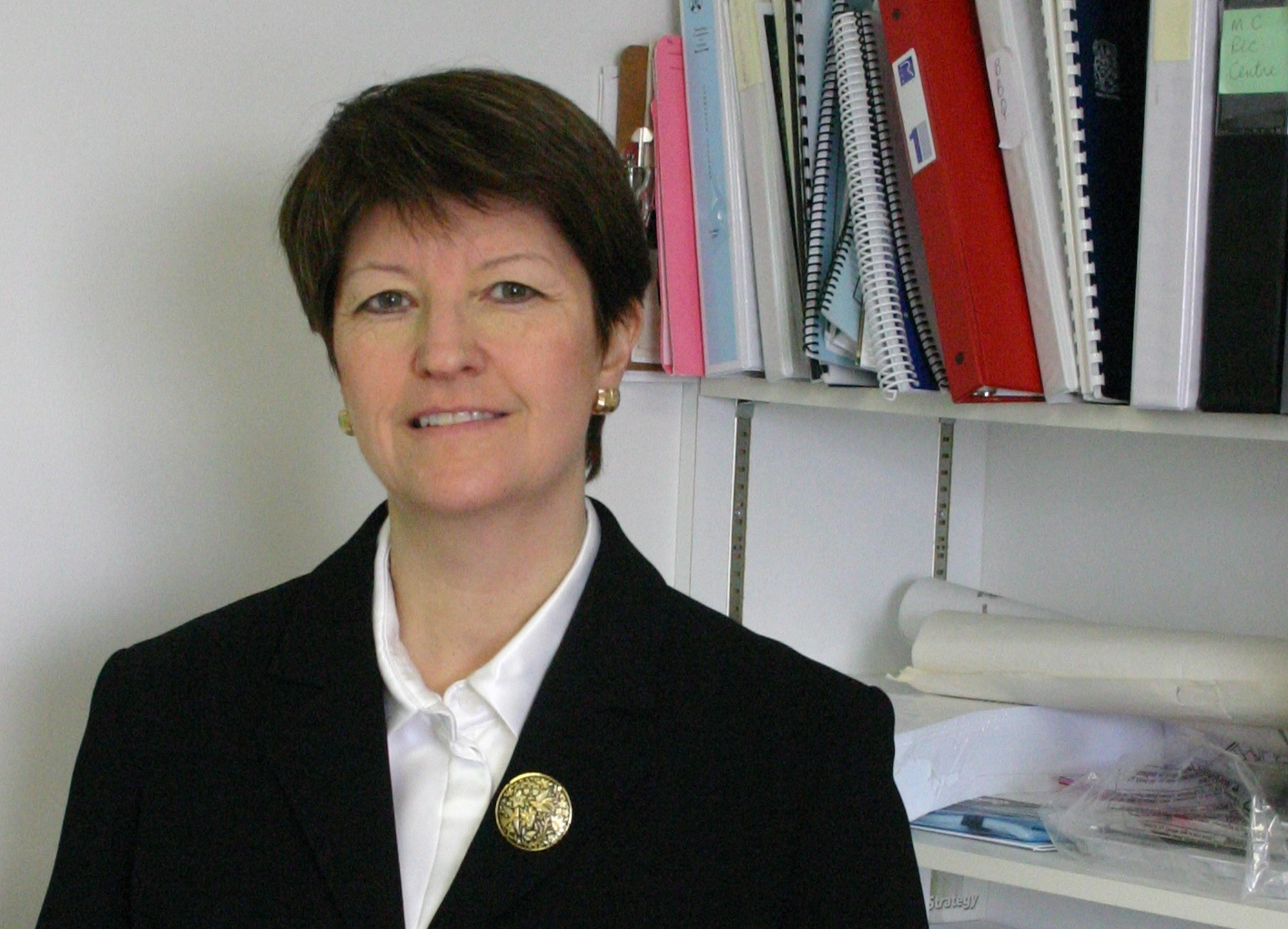
- The Honourable Diana Whalen, MLA

Member of the Nova Scotia House of Assembly for Clayton Park West Halifax Clayton Park (2003-2013)
- In office August 5, 2003 – May 30, 2017
- Preceded by: Mary Ann McGrath
- Succeeded by: Rafah DiCostanzo

Deputy Premier of Nova Scotia
- In office October 22, 2013 – May 30, 2017
- Premier: Stephen McNeil
- Preceded by: Frank Corbett
- Succeeded by: Karen Casey

Minister of Justice and Attorney General of Nova Scotia and Provincial Secretary of Nova Scotia
- In office July 24, 2015 – May 30, 2017
- Premier: Stephen McNeil
- Preceded by: Lena Diab
- Succeeded by: Mark Furey

Minister of Finance
- In office October 22, 2013 – July 24, 2015
- Premier: Stephen McNeil
- Preceded by: Maureen MacDonald
- Succeeded by: Randy Delorey

Personal details
- Born: Bay Shore, New York, U.S.
- Party: Nova Scotia Liberal Party
- Occupation: accountant

Diana Caroline Whalen is a Canadian politician who represented the electoral district of Halifax Clayton Park in the Nova Scotia House of Assembly from 2003-2013, and Clayton Park West from 2013-2017, as a member of the Nova Scotia Liberal Party.

== Early life and education ==
Whalen was born in Bay Shore, New York. She graduated with a BA and MBA from Dalhousie University.

== Before politics ==
Whalen worked in South Korea, Australia and Jamaica from 1980 to 1988 before returning to Halifax to raise her family. Holding the designation Certified Management Accountant (CMA), Whalen worked as a management consultant for 15 years.

Whalen was part of the planning team for the 21st G7 summit which took place in Halifax from June 15–17, 1995. In the late 1990s, Whalen founded a community action group dedicated to seeing a new P-9 school built in her fast-growing neighbourhood of Clayton Park West.

== Political career ==
Whalen was elected to Halifax Regional Council in the 2000 municipal election, representing District 16 Prince's Lodge-Clayton Park West.

In 2003 Whalen successfully ran for the Nova Scotia Liberal Party nomination in the riding of Halifax Clayton Park. She was elected in the 2003 provincial election and was subsequently re-elected in the 2006, 2009 and 2013 provincial elections.

In 2004, Whalen's private members bill for mandatory booster seats was passed by the legislature. Whalen championed the fight to preserve the Blue Mountain-Birch Cove Lakes Wilderness Area, which culminated in April 2009 when the provincial government granted protection from development for 1,214 hectares (3,000 acres) of wilderness in the area beside Bayers Lake Business Park. Whalen worked with constituents in her riding to lobby both the Halifax Regional Municipality and the provincial government for improved recreational infrastructure. This resulted in construction of the Canada Games Centre which opened on the Mainland Common in November 2010.

On January 18, 2007, Whalen confirmed after much speculation that she would run for the leadership of the Nova Scotia Liberal Party. She lost on the second ballot of the leadership to Stephen McNeil by 68 votes, despite the support of the two other candidates in the race, Kenzie MacKinnon and Mike Smith.

On October 22, 2013 Whalen was appointed to the Executive Council of Nova Scotia by McNeil, as Deputy Premier and Minister of Finance.

Whalen has been an advocate for a provincial February holiday since 2005 when she first introduced the Joseph Howe Day Act in the legislature. Whalen has been persistent in pointing out that the province has only five statutory holidays and has fallen further behind other provinces which have enacted a February holiday.

In April 2015, Whalen announced a cut to the Nova Scotia Film Tax Credit program. A controversial decision that was widely debated and protested. Several production studios and film productions in Halifax have cited this credit cut as the reason they've left or may have to leave Nova Scotia.

On July 24, 2015, McNeil shuffled his cabinet, moving Whalen to Minister of Justice.

On March 24, 2017, Whalen announced she will not run in the 2017 Nova Scotia general election.

== Honours ==
In 2009, Whalen was honoured by the Cornwallis Progress Club with a Women of Distinction Award in the category of Public Affairs and Communications for her work in the community.

== Electoral record ==
2013 Nova Scotia general election
Party	Candidate	Votes	%	±%
Liberal	Diana Whalen	5,569	67.48	N/A
New Democratic Party	Blake Wright	1,448	17.55	N/A
Progressive Conservative	Jaime D. Allen	1,236	14.98	N/A

2009 Nova Scotia general election
Party	Candidate	Votes	%	±%
Liberal	Diana Whalen	5,030	49.02	
New Democratic Party	Linda Power	3,924	38.24	
Progressive Conservative	Debbie Hum	1,084	10.56	
Green	Amanda Hester	172	1.68	–
Independent	Jonathan Dean	51	0.50	

2006 Nova Scotia general election
Party	Candidate	Votes	%	±%
Liberal	Diana Whalen	3,404	37.32	
New Democratic Party	Linda Power	3,040	33.33	
Progressive Conservative	Mary Ann McGrath	2,450	26.86	
Green	Sheila Richardson	228	2.5	–

2003 Nova Scotia general election
Party	Candidate	Votes	%	±%
Liberal	Diana Whalen	3,329	37.71	
Progressive Conservative	Mary Ann McGrath	3,034	34.52	
New Democratic Party	Roberta Morrison	2,312	26.14	
Independent	Greg Lavern	152	1.72	

=== 2000 municipal elections of the Halifax Regional Municipality ===
District 16: Prince's Lodge - Clayton Park West
Candidate	Votes	%	±
Diana Whalen	1,812	34.94%	
Bill Stone	1,745	33.65%	
Debbie Hum	1,607	30.99%	

== See also ==
- 2007 Nova Scotia Liberal Party leadership election
