= Frances Swan =

Mainer Contactee (1906-1997)

The Frances Swan story is a 20th-century legend of a Maine housewife who, in 1954, claims to receive messages from extra-terrestrials via automatic writing. Allegedly instructed by the messages to contact the Navy, the housewife reaches out to her next door neighbor, a retired admiral, who arranges for Naval investigators to interview the woman. Using automatic writing, naval investigators summon a UFO.

The story was publicized in a 1974 film hosted by Rod Serling (of Twilight Zone fame). Later accounts would label the housewife as "Frances Swan" and the Admiral as "Herbert Bain Knowles".

The story would become widespread in UFO folklore, featuring in the writings of ufologists including Stanton Friedman and Jacques Vallee.

== Initial narrative ==
In the 1974 film UFOs: Past, Present, and Future, retired Lt. Col. Robert Friend, former head of Project Bluebook, relates that "a retired Rear Admiral had information about a woman in upper Maine that purported to have contact with extraterrestrial beings. Two Naval Intelligence officers were sent to investigate. The naval officers met with the woman and she went into a trance, supposedly to establish contact with the purported extraterrestrials, and then they asked her scientific and technical questions that a woman of her education could not possibly know the answers to. Yet as the questions were put to her, she was able to answer easily, with seeming-telepathic help from these extraterrestrials."

Friend reports the supposed-'extraterrestrials' allegedly identified by names such as "Affa of Uranus", "Crill", and "Ponnar"; Affa and Ponnar were names that had been featured in The Saucers Speak (1954) by alleged-contactee George Hunt Williamson.

Friend continued "Then an unexpected turn took place. One of the naval officers was informed by the woman that they, the extraterrestrials, were willing to answer questions directly through him, a Naval Commander and Intelligence officer with no prior experience in telepathic communication. He took over and attempted to write down the answers to questions put to him by his fellow naval officer."

Friend tells of a subsequent incident involving this officer: "The group asked if they could see a spaceship and the Commander, still in a trance, told them to go to the window where they would have proof. The group moved to the window where they supposedly observed a UFO".

== Subsequent lore ==
The story was later featured in a 1979 issue of Second Look magazine and a 1980 book. The housewife was labeled "Frances Swan" in Jerome Clark's 1992 book The Emergence of a Phenomenon--UFOs from the Beginning Through 1959 and other subsequent publications.

In 2003, ufologist Grant Cameron released documents purportedly from the Swan incident. In 2007, ufologist Stanton Friedman reported that Admiral Knowles had attempted to introduce Swan to UFO abductees Betty and Barney Hill, but Swan refused. Betty Hill recalled:

"A few miles from Portsmouth is a woman who claims she is in contact with the occupants of UFOs, through automatic writing. Almost daily she sits and receives messages. Although she and I share some of the same friends, we have never met. She refuses to meet me, for she believes that Barney and I met the wrong ones—the evil ones, the ones of wrong vibrations. Hers are different types, who are kind, loving, concerned for all; who give her messages of brotherhood and the Kingdom of God. Barney and I both agreed that we had never seen those of a different vibration! But, in those days, we had never heard of George Adamski."

The Swan story has been featured in the writings of Nick Redfern, Brent Raynes, and numerous others. The Swan story was the basis for a 2013 episode of the series Wisdom Teachings.
