= Mac Tonnies =

American novelist

- Born: 20 August 1975
- Died: 22 October 2009 (aged 34)
- Occupation: Writer

Mac Tonnies (20 August 1975 – 22 October 2009) was an American author and blogger whose work focused on futurology, transhumanism and paranormal topics.

Tonnies grew up in Independence, Missouri, and attended William Chrisman High School and Ottawa University. He lived in Kansas City, Missouri. Tonnies had an active online presence and a "small, but devoted" readership, but supported himself by working at Starbucks and other nine-to-five jobs. In 2009 he died of cardiac arrhythmia at the age of 34.

== Books ==
His first book, a collection of science fiction short stories titled Illumined Black, was published by Phantom Press Publications in 1995, when Tonnies was in college. It carried a cover blurb by Bruce Sterling and was positively reviewed in Booklist. His second book, After the Martian Apocalypse, was published by Simon & Schuster in 2004. His third book, The Cryptoterrestrials, was published posthumously by Anomalist Books in 2010.

In November, 2012, Redstar Books published the first volume of Posthuman Blues, which contains excerpts from Tonnies' long-running blog of the same name. In the introduction, historian Aaron John Gulyas writes that, "Posthuman Blues is of a piece with the Lost Generation of the 1920s and the Beat Generation of the 1950s. Tonnies spoke for his generation with passion, eloquence, and a rare insight."

== Other media ==
In 2007 the play Doing Time, which he co-wrote with Canadian filmmaker Paul Kimball (who was working on a documentary about Tonnies), premiered in Halifax, Nova Scotia. He also appeared in the documentary Best Evidence: Top 10 UFO Sightings, and an episode of the Canadian television series Supernatural Investigator.

His blog, "Posthuman blues" was described by The Pitch as "one of Kansas City's best blogs, filled with well-written, intelligent takes on offbeat news items and humorous rants from a left-leaning political perspective."

He appeared on Coast to Coast AM in September 2009, and was a frequent guest on The Paracast.

== Cryptoterrestrial hypothesis ==
Tonnies developed the cryptoterrestrial hypothesis in his blog, and later in his third and last book Cryptoterrestrials, which was published posthumously with a foreword by Nick Redfern. In it, Tonnies proposes that the beings that are speculated to be behind UFOs and alien abductions are actually mysterious and secretive races of earthly origin, technically speaking a type of cryptid (hence the name, from Ancient Greek: κρυπτός, kryptós "hidden, secret" and Latin: terrestris, "related to the Earth"). According to Tonnies' theory, these races have existed on Earth for at least as long as humanity, and present themselves as extraterrestrials or occult beings. This theory has some elements in common with certain aspects of the Interdimensional UFO hypothesis, such as Jacques Vallée's control system, something Tonnies himself remarked in his work multiple times. Richard Shaver's ideas have also been cited as an antecedent.

== See also ==
- Extraterrestrial hypothesis
- Psychosocial hypothesis
- Space animal hypothesis
- Time-traveler UFO hypothesis
- Conspiracy theory
- John Keel
