= Bill Campbell (Nova Scotia politician) =

Canadian politician (1919–2003)

MLA for Colchester North
- In office 1978–1981
- Preceded by: new riding
- Succeeded by: Ed Lorraine

Personal details
- Born: July 1919 Norfolk County, Ontario
- Died: April 9, 2003 (aged 83)
- Party: Progressive Conservative

William L. Campbell (July 1919 – April 9, 2003) was a Canadian politician. He represented the electoral district of Colchester North in the Nova Scotia House of Assembly from 1978 to 1981. He was a member of the Progressive Conservative Party of Nova Scotia.

Born in 1919 at Norfolk County, Ontario, Campbell served in the Canadian Armed Forces from 1939 to 1968. He entered Nova Scotia provincial politics in the 1978 election, defeating the Liberal incumbent from Colchester, Floyd Tucker in the new Colchester North riding. In the 1981 election, Campbell was defeated by Liberal Ed Lorraine by 11 votes. Following his defeat, Campbell was appointed Nova Scotia's ombudsman, taking over on January 1, 1982.

Campbell died on April 9, 2003, at the age of 83.
