= Nick Redfern =

British journalist (born 1964)

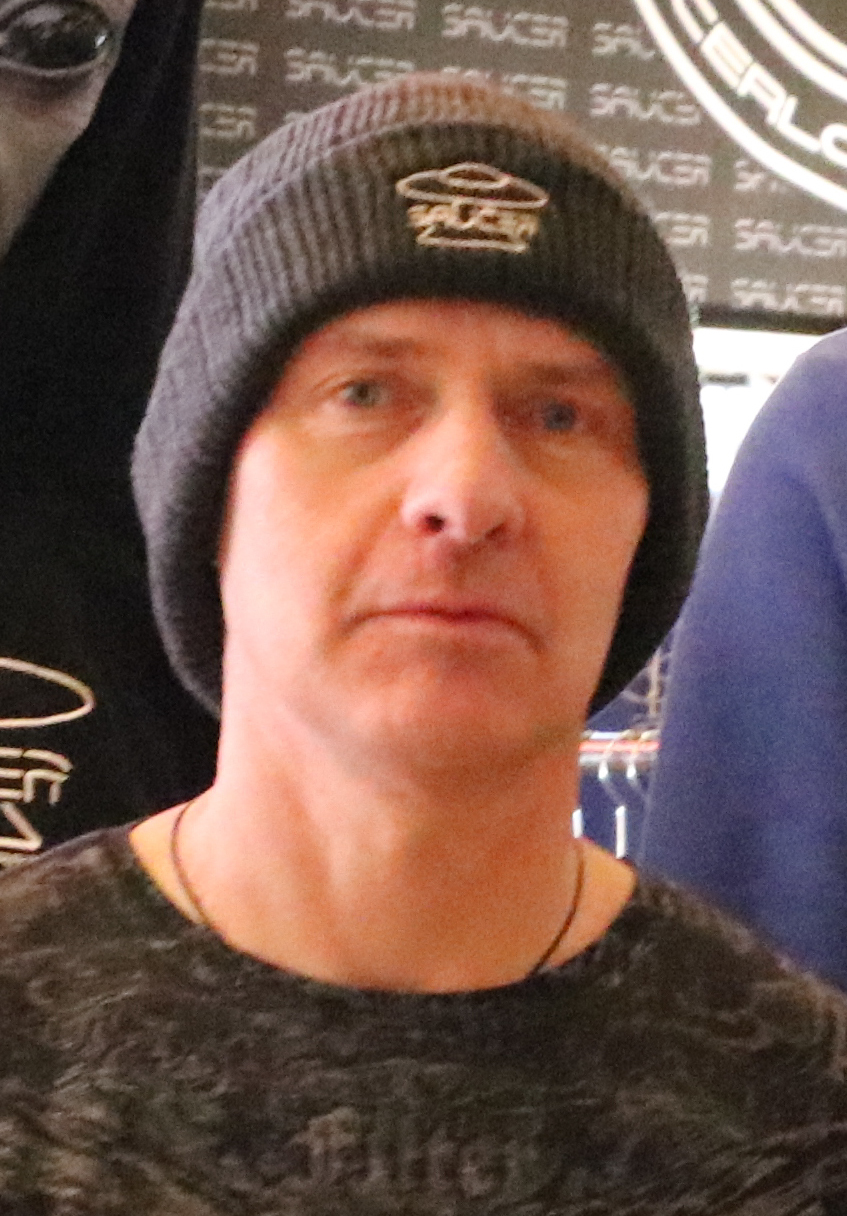
- Redfern at Alien Snowfest 2019 in Big Bear Lake
- Born: 1964 (age 61–62); Pelsall, Walsall, England
- Occupations: Author; Journalist; Cryptozoologist; Ufologist; Conspiracy theorist
- Website: nickredfernfortean.blogspot.com

Nicholas Redfern (born 1964) is a British author of books on unidentified flying objects, cryptozoology, conspiracy theories and similar subjects. Several of his books have been best-sellers.

Redfern is an active advocate of official government disclosure of UFO information, and has worked to uncover thousands of pages of previously classified Royal Air Force, Air Ministry and Ministry of Defence files on unidentified flying objects (UFOs) dating from the Second World War from the Public Record Office and currently works as a feature writer and contributing editor for Phenomena magazine.

His 2005 book, Body Snatchers in the Desert: The Horrible Truth at the Heart of the Roswell Story, purports to show that the Roswell incident may have been military aircraft tests using Japanese POWs, suffering from progeria or radiation effects.

== Biography ==
Redfern attended Pelsall Comprehensive School in Pelsall from 1976 to 1981. He also worked at Dixons paint suppliers with another Ufologist Martin Lenton.

Redfern joined a rock music and fashion magazine Zero in 1981, where he trained in journalism, writing, magazine production and photography, later going on to write freelance articles on UFOs during the mid-1980s.

From 1984 until 2001 he worked as a freelance feature writer for the Daily Express, People, Western Daily Press and Express & Star newspapers, as well as a full-time feature writer for Planet on Sunday. Between 1996 and 2001 he worked as a freelance journalist for the British newsstand magazines The Weekender, Animals, Animals, Animals, Pet Reptile, Military Illustrated, Eye-Spy, The Unopened Files and The X-Factor.

Between 1996 and 2000 Redfern signed a three-book publishing deal with Simon & Schuster of London for the publication of A Covert Agenda: The British Government’s UFO Top Secrets Exposed (1997), The FBI Files: The FBI’s UFO Top Secrets Exposed (1998) and Cosmic Crashes: The Incredible Story of the UFOs That Fell to Earth (1999). These books were published in the United Kingdom, Canada, Russia, Poland, Australia, New Zealand and Portugal.

In 2003 Paraview-Pocket Books New York published Redfern's book Strange Secrets: Real Government Files on the Unknown in May of that year. And, in March 2004 Paraview-Pocket Books, New York, published his book Three Men Seeking Monsters: Six Weeks in Pursuit of Werewolves, Lake Monsters, Giant Cats, Ghostly Devil Dogs, and Ape-Men. This book tells the story of his relationship with Jonathan Downes and Richard Freeman of the Centre for Fortean Zoology, and has been optioned by Universal Studios though as of 2021 it has not been released. Redfern has run the U.S. branch of the Centre for Fortean Zoology since 2002.

Redfern works on the lecture circuit, both in the UK and overseas, and has appeared in internationally syndicated shows discussing the UFO phenomenon. Redfern is a regular on the History Channel programs Monster Quest and UFO Hunters, National Geographic Channels's Paranormal and the Syfy channel's Proof Positive, as well as appearing in an episode in the third season of Penn & Teller: Bullshit!, titled "Ghost Busters". He has also appeared on a variety of television programmes in the United Kingdom, including The Big Breakfast, Channel 5 News, and GMTV.

He has been identified as a member of an informal group of friends sometimes called the "Paranormal Rat Pack" and "The Cabal"; other members are filmmaker Paul Kimball, and author Greg Bishop; Mac Tonnies was also a member.

== Body Snatchers in the Desert (2005) ==
In 2005, Nicholas Redfern authored Body Snatchers in the Desert : The Horrible Truth at the Heart of the Roswell Story, a book that suggests the Roswell crash may have been the result of a top secret high-altitude balloon test. According to Redfern's narrative, the test used deformed Japanese POWs acquired after a battle in 1945 on a small island in the Pacific. Redfern suggests the test was part of a program resulting from an import of Japanese scientists after the war in similar vein to Operation Paperclip. The Japanese scientists are alleged to have brought POWs with them to continue experimenting radiation, cosmic ray & high altitude effects on people, including people with progeria.

== Bibliography ==
- A Covert Agenda: The British Government's UFO Top Secrets Exposed (1997) by Nick Redfern – ISBN 1-931044-70-8
- The F.B.I. Files (1998) by Nick Redfern – ISBN 0-684-86834-2
- Cosmic Crashes (1999) by Nick Redfern – ISBN 0-671-03306-9
- Monsters of Texas (2000) by Nick Redfern and Ken Gerhard
- Strange Secrets (2003) by Nick Redfern and Andy J. Roberts – ISBN 0-7434-6976-3
- Three Men Seeking Monsters (2004) by Nick Redfern – ISBN 0-7434-8254-9
- Body Snatchers in the Desert: The Horrible Truth at the Heart of the Roswell Story (2005) by Nick Redfern – ISBN 0-7434-9753-8
- On The Trail of the Saucer Spies (2006) by Nick Redfern – ISBN 1-933665-10-6
- Celebrity Secrets: Official Government Files on the Rich and Famous (2007) by Nick Redfern – ISBN 1-4165-2866-0
- Man-Monkey – In Search of the British Bigfoot (2007) by Nick Redfern – ISBN 1-905723-16-4
- Memoirs of a Monster Hunter: A Five-Year Journey in Search of the Unknown (2007) by Nick Redfern – ISBN 1-56414-976-5
- THERE'S SOMETHING IN THE WOODS: A Transatlantic Hunt for Monsters and the Mysterious (2008) ISBN 978-1933665320
- Contactees: A History of Alien-Human Interaction (2009) by Nick Redfern – ISBN 978-1601630964
- FINAL EVENTS and the Secret Government Group on Demonic UFOs and the Afterlife (2010) - ISBN 978-1933665481
- The NASA Conspiracies (2011) by Nick Redfern – ISBN 1-60163-149-9
- The Real Men in Black (2011) by Nick Redfern – ISBN 1-60163157-X
- Keep Out!: Top Secret Places Governments Don’t Want You to Know About (2011) - ISBN 978-1601631848
- The Pyramids and the Pentagon: The Government's Top Secret Pursuit of Mystical Relics, Ancient Astronauts, and Lost Civilizations (2012) - ISBN 978-1601632067
- The World's Weirdest Places (2012) - ISBN 978-1601632371
- Wildman! (2012) - ISBN 978-1-909488-04-5
- Monster Files: A Look Inside Government Secrets and Classified Documents on Bizarre Creatures and Extraordinary Animals (2013) - ISBN 978-1601632630
- The Most Mysterious Places on Earth (2013) - ISBN 978-1-4777-0681-7
- For Nobody's Eyes Only: Missing Government Files and Hidden Archives That Document the Truth Behind the Most Enduring Conspiracy Theories (2013) - ISBN 978-1601632883
- Close Encounters of the Fatal Kind: Suspicious Deaths, Mysterious Murders, and Bizarre Disappearances in UFO History (2014) - ISBN 978-1601633118
- True Stories of the Real Men in Black (2014) - ISBN 978-1-4777-7837-1
- The Zombie Book: Encyclopedia of the Living Dead (2014) by Nick Redfern and Brad Steiger – ISBN 978-1578595044
- Secret History: Conspiracies from Ancient Aliens to the New World Order (2015) - ISBN 978-1578594795
- The Bigfoot Book: The Encyclopedia of Sasquatch, Yeti and Cryptid Primates (2015) - ISBN 978-1578595617
- Bloodline of the Gods: Unravel the Mystery of the Human Blood Type to Reveal the Aliens Among Us (2015) - ISBN 978-1601633651
- Men in Black: Personal Stories & Eerie Adventures (2015) - ISBN 978-0976498667
- Woman In Black: The Creepy Companions of the Mysterious M.I.B. (2016) - ISBN 978-0996968683
- Weapons of the Gods: How Ancient Alien Civilizations Almost Destroyed the Earth (2016) - ISBN 978-1632650382
- The Monster Book: Creatures, Beasts and Fiends of Nature (The Real Unexplained! Collection) (2016) - ISBN 978-1578595754
- Immortality of the Gods: Legends, Mysteries, and the Alien Connection to Eternal Life (2016) - ISBN 978-1632650757
- Nessie: Exploring the Supernatural Origins of the Loch Ness Monster (2016) - ISBN 978-0-7387-4710-1
- Secret Societies The Complete Guide to Histories, Rites, and Rituals (2017) - ISBN 978-1-57859-483-2
- 365 Days of UFOs: A Year of Alien Encounters (2017) - ISBN 978-1945962011
- The Roswell UFO Conspiracy: Exposing A Shocking And Sinister Secret (2017) - ISBN 978-1945962042
- The New World Order Book (2017) - ISBN 978-1578596157
- Shapeshifters: Morphing Monsters and Changing Cryptids (2017) - ISBN 978-0-7387-5203-7
- The Slenderman Mysteries: An Internet Urban Legend Comes to Life (2018) - ISBN 978-1632651129
- Control: MKUltra, Chemtrails and the Conspiracy to Suppress the Masses (2018) - ISBN 978-1578596386
- The Black Diary: M.I.B, Women in Black, Black-Eyed Children, and Dangerous Books (2018) - ISBN 978-1945962110
- Chupacabra Road Trip: One Man’s Hunt for Vampires (2018) - ISBN 978-1945962141
- Paranormal Parasites: The Voracious Appetites of Soul-Sucking Supernatural Entities (2018) - ISBN 978-0738753553
- Top Secret Alien Abduction Files: What the Government Doesn't Want You to Know (2018) - ISBN 978-1938875168
- Area 51: The Revealing Truth of UFOs, Secret Aircraft, Cover-Ups & Conspiracies (The Real Unexplained! Collection) - ISBN 978-1-57859-672-0
- Cover-Ups & Secrets: The Complete Guide to Government Conspiracies, Manipulations & Deceptions (2019) – ISBN 978-1578596799
- Flying Saucers from the Kremlin: UFOs, Russian Meddling, Soviet Spies & Cold War Secrets (2019) - ISBN 978-1945962189
- The Alien Book: A Guide To Extraterrestrial Beings On Earth (The Real Unexplained! Collection) (2020) - ISBN 978-1578596874
- Assassinations: The Plots, Politics, and Powers behind History-Changing Murders (2020) - ISBN 978-1578596904
- The Rendlesham Forest UFO Conspiracy: A Close Encounter Exposed as a Top Secret Government Experiment (2020) - ISBN 978-1945962288
- Monsters of the Deep (The Real Unexplained! Collection) (2020) - ISBN 978-1578597055
- The Martians: Evidence of Life on the Red Planet (2020) - ISBN 978-1632651761
- Diary of Secrets: UFO Conspiracies and the Mysterious Death of Marilyn Monroe (2021) - ISBN 978-1945962363
- Time Travel: The Science and Science Fiction (The Real Unexplained! Collection) (2021) - ISBN 978-1578597239
- How Antigravity Built the Pyramids: The Mysterious Technology of Ancient Superstructures (2022) - ISBN 978-1637480021
- Runaway Science: True Stories of Raging Robots and Hi-Tech Horrors (The Real Unexplained! Collection) (2023) - ISBN 978-1578598014
- Mothman & Other Flying Monsters: Nuclear Nightmares & Armageddon (2023) - ISBN 978-1945962561
- Werewolf Stories: Shape-Shifters, Lycanthropes, and Man-Beasts (The Real Unexplained! Collection) (2023) - ISBN 978-1578597666

== See also ==
- Rendlesham Forest Incident
