= Rafah DiCostanzo =

Canadian politician

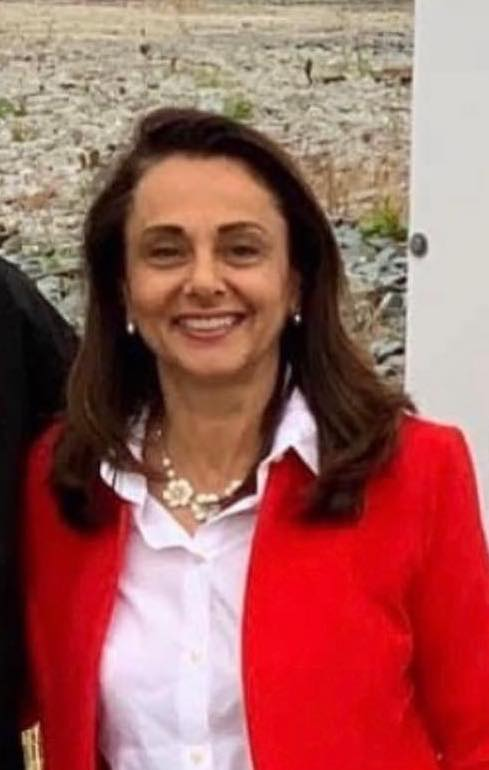

Member of the Nova Scotia House of Assembly for Clayton Park West
- In office May 30, 2017 – October 27, 2024
- Preceded by: Diana Whalen
- Succeeded by: Adegoke Fadare

Personal details
- Born: May 2, 1962 (age 64) Baghdad, Iraq
- Party: Liberal
- Spouse: John DiCostanzo
- Occupation: Interpreter

Rafah DiCostanzo (born May 2, 1962) is a Canadian politician. She was elected to the Nova Scotia House of Assembly in the 2017 provincial election. She announced that she would not be seeking reelection in October 2024.

== Early life and education ==
DiCostanzo was born in Baghdad, Iraq. She moved to Great Britain as a teenager and arrived in Canada in 1984. She graduated from Mount Saint Vincent University in 1988 with a bachelor of arts in modern languages. She has been an Arabic interpreter with Nova Scotia Interpreting Services since 1990.

== Personal life ==
DiCostanzo is married to John DiCostanzo, a lawyer. Dicostanzo has lived in Clayton Park West for over 33 years.

DiCostanzo worked for Nova Scotia Interpreting Services and also has experience in banking administration, travel constituency, entrepreneurship and business ownership. DiCostanzo speaks five different languages and has worked as an interpreter for new immigrants and refugees for almost 30 years.

== Political career ==
DiCostanzo is a member of the Nova Scotia Liberal Party. First elected in 2017, DiCostanzo became the first Iraqi-Canadian elected to the Nova Scotia House of Assembly. she has represented the electoral district of Clayton Park West since 2017.

DiCostanzo and other community leaders set up a "Stop Littering Committee" in Clayton Park West and challenged other MLAs to help reduce litter and start a conversation about waste management in their ridings.

DiCostanzo was currently the Liberal Caucus Chair and vice-Chair of the Community Services Committee, and Chair of the Human Resources Committee, and Chair of the Veterans Affairs Committee, and Chair of the Private and Local Bills Committee, and Chair of the Health Committee, and Vice-Chair of the Natural Resources and Economic Development Committee. DiCostanzo was a member of the Public Accounts, Internal Affairs and Law Amendments Committees. She was also a member of the House of Assembly Management Commission.

DiCostanzo was re-elected in the 2021 provincial election. From September 22, 2024, she served as the Official Opposition critic for Immigration, the Office of Mental Health and Addictions, and Seniors & Long Term Care. In October 2024, she announced that she would not run in the 2024 Nova Scotia general election on account of her health, having ended cancer treatments in October previous year.

== Electoral record ==
2021 Nova Scotia general election: Clayton Park West
Party	Candidate	Votes	%	±%	Expenditures
Liberal	Rafah DiCostanzo	3,603	47.60	+1.97	$56,738.05
Progressive Conservative	Nargis DeMolitor	1,875	24.77	-1.39	$14,590.30
New Democratic	Reena Davis	1,836	24.25	+3.41	$23,194.34
Green	Richard Zurawski	210	2.77	-2.76	$200.00
Atlantica	Helen Lau	46	0.61	-1.22	$200.00
Total valid votes/expense limit		7,570	99.74		$83,815.86
Total rejected ballots		20	0.26		
Turnout		7,590	52.44		
Eligible voters		14,474			
Liberal hold		Swing		+1.68	
Source: Elections Nova Scotia

2017 Nova Scotia general election: Clayton Park West
Party	Candidate	Votes	%	±%
Liberal	Rafah DiCostanzo	4,035	46.04	-21.44
Progressive Conservative	Paul Kimball	2,304	26.29	+11.31
New Democratic	Rana Zaman	1,764	20.13	+2.58
Green	Thomas Trappenberg	506	5.77	N/A
Atlantica	Jonathan Dean	154	1.78	N/A
Total valid votes		8,763	100.0	
Total rejected ballots		30	0.34	
Turnout		8,793	49.90	
Eligible voters		17,620		
Liberal hold		Swing		-16.38
Source: Elections Nova Scotia
