= Clayton Park West (electoral district) =

Provincial electoral district in Nova Scotia, Canada

Nova Scotia electoral district

Provincial electoral district
- Legislature: Nova Scotia House of Assembly
MLA
Adegoke Fadare
Progressive Conservative
- District created: 1978
- First contested: 1978
- Last contested: 2024

Demographics
- Electors: 17,712
- Area (km²): 9
- Census division: Halifax Regional Municipality

Clayton Park West is a provincial electoral district in Nova Scotia, Canada, that elects one member of the Nova Scotia House of Assembly.

The riding was created in 1978 as Halifax Bedford Basin from a portion of Halifax Cobequid. In 2003, the district lost a northern area to Bedford and was renamed Halifax Clayton Park. Following the 2012 electoral boundary review, the district was renamed Clayton Park West. It gained Birch Cove and Kearney Lake areas from Bedford-Birch Cove and the Kearney Lake area from Hammonds Plains-Upper Sackville. It lost the Susies Lake and Quarrie Lake areas to Timberlea-Prospect; the areas south of Mount Saint Vincent University and Lacewood Drive as well as the Washmill Lake Drive area the Fairview-Clayton Park.

== Geography ==
The land area of Clayton Park West is 9 km^{2} (3.5 sq mi).

== Members of the Legislative Assembly ==
This riding has elected the following members of the Legislative Assembly:

Legislature	Years	Member	Party
Halifax Bedford Basin; Riding created from Halifax Cobequid and Halifax St. Margarets
52nd	1978–1981	Joel Matheson	Progressive Conservative
53rd	1981–1984	Joel Matheson	Progressive Conservative
54th	1984–1988	Joel Matheson	Progressive Conservative
55th	1988–1993	Joel Matheson	Progressive Conservative
56th	1993–1998	Gerry Fogarty	Liberal
57th	1998–1999	Gerry Fogarty	Liberal
58th	1999–2003	Mary Ann McGrath	Progressive Conservative
Halifax Clayton Park
59th	2003–2006	Diana Whalen	Liberal
60th	2006–2009	Diana Whalen	Liberal
61st	2009–2013	Diana Whalen	Liberal
Clayton Park West
62nd	2013–2017	Diana Whalen	Liberal
63rd	2017–2021	Rafah DiCostanzo	Liberal
64th	2021–2024	Rafah DiCostanzo	Liberal
65th	2024–present	Adegoke Fadare	Progressive Conservative

== Election results ==
=== 2024 ===
2024 Nova Scotia general election
Party	Candidate	Votes	%	±%
Progressive Conservative	Adegoke Fadare	2,096	35.41	10.64
New Democratic	Wendy Hood-Morris	2,010	33.96	9.70
Liberal	Elizabeth Eustaquio-Domondon	1,813	30.63	-16.97
Total		5,919	–	
Total rejected ballots		35		
Turnout		5,955	40.75	
Eligible voters		14,614		
Progressive Conservative gain		Swing		
Source: Elections Nova Scotia

=== 2021 ===
2021 Nova Scotia general election
Party	Candidate	Votes	%	±%	Expenditures
Liberal	Rafah DiCostanzo	3,603	47.60	+1.97	$56,738.05
Progressive Conservative	Nargis DeMolitor	1,875	24.77	-1.39	$14,590.30
New Democratic	Reena Davis	1,836	24.25	+3.41	$23,194.34
Green	Richard Zurawski	210	2.77	-2.76	$200.00
Atlantica	Helen Lau	46	0.61	-1.22	$200.00
Total valid votes/expense limit		7,570	99.74		$83,815.86
Total rejected ballots		20	0.26		
Turnout		7,590	52.44		
Eligible voters		14,474			
Liberal hold		Swing		+1.68	
Source: Elections Nova Scotia

=== 2017 ===
2017 provincial election redistributed results
Party	Vote	%
Liberal	3,312	45.63
Progressive Conservative	1,899	26.16
New Democratic	1,513	20.84
Green	402	5.54
Atlantica	133	1.83

2017 Nova Scotia general election
Party	Candidate	Votes	%	±%
Liberal	Rafah DiCostanzo	4,035	46.04	-21.44
Progressive Conservative	Paul Kimball	2,304	26.29	+11.31
New Democratic	Rana Zaman	1,764	20.13	+2.58
Green	Thomas Trappenberg	506	5.77	N/A
Atlantica	Jonathan Dean	154	1.78	N/A
Total valid votes		8,763	100.0	
Total rejected ballots		30	0.34	
Turnout		8,793	49.90	
Eligible voters		17,620		
Liberal hold		Swing		-16.38
Source: Elections Nova Scotia

=== 2013 ===
2013 Nova Scotia general election
Party	Candidate	Votes	%	±%
Liberal	Diana Whalen	5,929	67.81%	+29.60%
New Democratic	Blake Wright	1,515	17.33%	-16.35%
Progressive Conservative	Jaime Allen	1,299	14.86%	3.02%
Total		8,743	–	
Source(s) Source: Nova Scotia Legislature (2024). "Electoral History for Clayton Park West" (PDF). nslegislature.ca. Nova Scotia, Chief Electoral Officer (2013). 39th Provincial General Election, October 8, 2013: Volume 1 – Statement of Votes & Statistics (PDF) (Report). Elections Nova Scotia. Archived from the original (PDF) on 10 April 2018.

=== 2009 ===
2009 Nova Scotia general election: Halifax Clayton Park
Party	Candidate	Votes	%	±%
Liberal	Diana Whalen	5,030	49.02%	11.79%
New Democratic	Linda Power	3,924	38.24%	4.77%
Progressive Conservative	Debbie Hum	1,084	10.56%	-16.24%
Green	Amanda Hester	172	1.68%	-0.82%
Independent (Atlantica)	Jonathan G. Dean	51	0.50%	–
Total		10,261	–	
Source(s) Source: Nova Scotia Legislature (2024). "Electoral History for Halifax Clayton Park" (PDF). nslegislature.ca.

=== 2006 ===
2006 Nova Scotia general election: Halifax Clayton Park
Party	Candidate	Votes	%	±%
Liberal	Diana Whalen	3,404	37.23%	-0.48%
New Democratic	Linda Power	3,060	33.47%	7.28%
Progressive Conservative	Mary Ann McGrath	2,450	26.80%	-7.57%
Green	Sheila G. Richardson	228	2.49%	–
Total		9,142	–	
Source(s) Source: Nova Scotia Legislature (2024). "Electoral History for Halifax Clayton Park" (PDF). nslegislature.ca.

=== 2003 ===
2003 Nova Scotia general election: Halifax Clayton Park
Party	Candidate	Votes	%	±%
Liberal	Diana Whalen	3,329	37.71%	9.97%
Progressive Conservative	Mary Ann McGrath	3,034	34.37%	-8.06%
New Democratic	Roberta Morrison	2,312	26.19%	-1.66%
Independent	Greg Lavern	152	1.72%	–
Total		8,827	–	
Source(s) Source: Nova Scotia Legislature (2024). "Electoral History for Halifax Clayton Park" (PDF). nslegislature.ca.

=== 1999 ===
1999 Nova Scotia general election: Halifax Bedford Basin
Party	Candidate	Votes	%	±%
Progressive Conservative	Mary Ann McGrath	4,489	42.43%	18.54%
New Democratic	Errol Gaum	2,946	27.85%	-8.16%
Liberal	Jack Hardiman	2,935	27.74%	-12.35%
Nova Scotia Party	Janice Lively	209	1.98%	–
Total		10,579	–	
Source(s) Source: Nova Scotia Legislature (2024). "Electoral History for Halifax Bedford Basin" (PDF). nslegislature.ca. Nova Scotia, Chief Electoral Officer (1999). Returns of the General Election for the House of Assembly, Thirty-Fifth General Election (Report). Elections Nova Scotia.

=== 1998 ===
1998 Nova Scotia general election: Halifax Bedford Basin
Party	Candidate	Votes	%	±%
Liberal	Gerry Fogarty	4,246	40.10%	-1.11%
New Democratic	Errol Gaum	3,813	36.01%	15.53%
Progressive Conservative	Michael Maddalena	2,530	23.89%	-13.74%
Total		10,589	–	
Source(s) Source: Nova Scotia Legislature (2024). "Electoral History for Halifax Bedford Basin" (PDF). nslegislature.ca.

=== 1993 ===
1993 Nova Scotia general election: Halifax Bedford Basin
Party	Candidate	Votes	%	±%
Liberal	Gerry Fogarty	4,676	41.21%	6.13%
Progressive Conservative	Joel Matheson	4,270	37.63%	-7.92%
New Democratic	Clarrie MacKinnon	2,323	20.47%	1.12%
Natural Law	Pulkesh Lakhanpal	77	0.68%	–
Total		11,346	–	
Source(s) Source: Nova Scotia Legislature (2024). "Electoral History for Halifax Bedford Basin" (PDF). nslegislature.ca. Nova Scotia, Chief Electoral Officer (1993). Returns of the General Election for the House of Assembly, Thirty-Third General Election (PDF) (Report). Queen's Printer. Archived from the original (PDF) on 18 June 2018.

=== 1988 ===
1988 Nova Scotia general election: Halifax Bedford Basin
Party	Candidate	Votes	%	±%
Progressive Conservative	Joel Matheson	6,462	45.56%	-1.77%
Liberal	Penny LaRocque	4,977	35.09%	16.34%
New Democratic	John Dunsworth	2,746	19.36%	-14.57%
Total		14,185	–	
Source(s) Source: Nova Scotia Legislature (2024). "Electoral History for Halifax Bedford Basin" (PDF). nslegislature.ca. Nova Scotia, Chief Electoral Officer (1988). Returns of the General Election for the House of Assembly, Thirty-Second General Election (PDF) (Report). Queen's Printer. Archived from the original (PDF) on 7 July 2018.

=== 1984 ===
1984 Nova Scotia general election: Halifax Bedford Basin
Party	Candidate	Votes	%	±%
Progressive Conservative	Joel Matheson	5,613	47.32%	-2.08%
New Democratic	Paul Fiander	4,024	33.93%	9.63%
Liberal	Alan Weeks	2,224	18.75%	-7.55%
Total		11,861	–	
Source(s) Source: Nova Scotia Legislature (2024). "Electoral History for Halifax Bedford Basin" (PDF). nslegislature.ca. Nova Scotia, Chief Electoral Officer (1984). Returns of the General Election for the House of Assembly, Thirty-First General Election (PDF) (Report). Queen's Printer. Archived from the original (PDF) on 31 July 2017.

=== 1981 ===
1981 Nova Scotia general election: Halifax Bedford Basin
Party	Candidate	Votes	%	±%
Progressive Conservative	Joel Matheson	6,087	49.41%	-4.95%
Liberal	John Genik	3,240	26.30%	-8.78%
New Democratic	Peter Delefes	2,993	24.29%	13.73%
Total		12,320	–	
Source(s) Source: Nova Scotia Legislature (2024). "Electoral History for Halifax Bedford Basin" (PDF). nslegislature.ca. Nova Scotia, Chief Electoral Officer (1981). Returns of the General Election for the House of Assembly, Thirtieth General Election (PDF) (Report). Queen's Printer. Archived from the original (PDF) on 31 July 2017.

=== 1978 ===
1978 Nova Scotia general election: Halifax Bedford Basin
Party	Candidate	Votes	%	±%
Progressive Conservative	Joel Matheson	6,325	54.36%	–
Liberal	Wilfred Moore	4,081	35.08%	–
New Democratic	Tom Orman	1,229	10.56%	–
Total		11,635	–	
Source(s) Source: Nova Scotia Legislature (2024). "Electoral History for Halifax Bedford Basin" (PDF). nslegislature.ca. Nova Scotia, Chief Electoral Officer (1978). Returns of the General Election for the House of Assembly, Twenty-Ninth General Election (PDF) (Report). Queen's Printer. Archived from the original (PDF) on 18 June 2018.

== See also ==
- List of Nova Scotia provincial electoral districts
- Canadian provincial electoral districts
