= Bill Langille =

Canadian politician (1944–2020)

MLA for Colchester North
- In office 1999–2006
- Preceded by: Ed Lorraine
- Succeeded by: Karen Casey

Personal details
- Born: Harold William Langille; January 18, 1944 Truro, Nova Scotia
- Died: April 12, 2020 (aged 76) Little Dyke, Nova Scotia
- Party: Progressive Conservative
- Occupation: Police officer, tree farmer

Harold William Langille (January 18, 1944 – April 12, 2020) was a tree farmer, police officer and political figure in Nova Scotia, Canada. He represented Colchester North in the Nova Scotia House of Assembly from 1999 to 2006 as a Progressive Conservative.

Born in 1944 in Truro, Nova Scotia, Langille was educated at the Ontario Police College and the Ontario Provincial Police Academy. He worked as a police officer in Truro and Ontario. After his retirement in 1994, he returned to Nova Scotia and owned and operated tree farms in Colchester County. Langille entered provincial politics in 1999, winning the Colchester North riding by more than 1300 votes. In the 2003 election, he was re-elected by more than 1100 votes. Langille did not reoffer in the 2006 election. He died of liver cancer on April 12, 2020.
