= Herbert Bain Knowles =

- Born: March 20, 1894; North Newburgh, Maine
- Died: March 3, 1976 (aged 81)
- Service / branch: Navy
- Rank: Admiral

Herbert Bain Knowles (1894–1976) was an officer in the United States Navy during the World Wars who retired with the rank of Admiral.

== Career ==
Knowles was born on March 20, 1894, in North Newburgh, Maine.

In 1917, Knowles graduated from the United States Naval Academy. In 1919, he married Helen Kamp. Knowles served aboard the battleship USS Arkansas and the submarine service. During World War II, Knowles commanded several submarines, participating in a dozen Pacific Theater campaigns. He commanded the USS Heywood during the assault on Guadalcanal. He participated in the assault on Tarawa. Knowles was a five-time recipient of the Legion of Merit.

After the war, Knowles taught submarine electricity at a Navy school in New London, Connecticut. In 1947, Knowles retired with a rank of Rear Admiral. In retirement, Knowles was a board member of National Investigations Committee On Aerial Phenomena, a civilian group, and interviewed UFO contactees like Frances Swan and Betty Hill.

Knowles died on March 3, 1976.
