= Karen Casey =

Canadian politician (born 1947)

The Honourable Karen Casey ECNS

Member of the Nova Scotia House of Assembly for Colchester North
- In office June 13, 2006 – July 17, 2021
- Preceded by: Bill Langille
- Succeeded by: Tom Taggart

Deputy Premier of Nova Scotia
- In office June 15, 2017 – February 23, 2021
- Premier: Stephen McNeil
- Preceded by: Diana Whalen
- Succeeded by: Kelly Regan

Personal details
- Born: April 24, 1947 (age 79)
- Party: Progressive Conservative (2006-2011); Liberal (2011-present)
- Spouse: Glen

Karen Lynn Casey (born April 24, 1947) is a Canadian politician, who represented the electoral district of Colchester North in the Nova Scotia House of Assembly, first as a Progressive Conservative (2006 to 2011), and then as member of the Liberal caucus from 2011 to 2021.

== Personal life ==
Casey (née Thompson) grew up in Bass River. Casey volunteered as chair of the now-defunct Colchester-East Hants Health Authority.

== Education career ==
Casey graduated in 1967 with a diploma from the Nova Scotia Teachers College. She later received a B.A. from Mount Saint Vincent University, a B.Ed. from Mount Saint Vincent University and a M. Ed. (Administration) from Saint Mary's University.

Casey has worked as a classroom teacher at various schools in Colchester County in both the Truro Municipal School Board, the Colchester County Municipal School Board, the Colchester-East Hants District School Board, and ended her career with the Chignecto-Central Regional School Board. She is a former principal of North River Elementary School and served as Assistant Superintendent of the Chignecto-Central Regional School Board.

When working as a classroom teacher at Alice Street Elementary School in the Truro Municipal School Board during the 1970-71 school year, Casey served as the school staff's local representative of the Nova Scotia Teachers Union during a work-to-rule job action undertaken by the NSTU.

== Political career ==
=== PC Party 2006–2011 ===
Casey successfully ran for the Progressive Conservative nomination in the riding of Colchester North in spring 2006, beating one other candidate. Casey was elected to the Nova Scotia House of Assembly in the 2006 provincial election held that June.

Casey served in the Executive Council of Nova Scotia from 2006–2009, serving first as the Minister of Education, and later as Minister of Health. On June 24, 2009, Casey was named the Progressive Conservative Party's interim leader, replacing Rodney MacDonald after he resigned following the party's defeat in the 2009 provincial election. She served as interim leader until announcing her resignation on August 16, 2010.

=== Liberal Party 2011–present ===
On January 10, 2011, Casey crossed the floor to join the Liberal caucus. Casey successfully ran for the Liberal nomination in the riding of Colchester North in spring 2013. Casey was re-elected in the 2013 provincial election, garnering 5,005 of the 8,212 votes cast or 60.95% of the vote in the riding.

On October 22, 2013 Casey was appointed to the Executive Council of Nova Scotia as Minister of Education and Early Childhood Development as well as Minister responsible for Youth.

On July 24, 2015, Casey was given as additional role as Chair of Finance and Treasury Board, while responsibility for youth was transferred to Kelly Regan.

On June 15, 2017, premier Stephen McNeil shuffled his cabinet, appointing Casey as Deputy Premier and Minister of Finance and Treasury Board.

On January 21, 2021, Casey announced that she did not intend to run in the next provincial general election.

== Electoral record ==
2017 Nova Scotia general election
Party	Candidate	Votes	%	±%
Liberal	Karen Casey	3,654	46.6	
Progressive Conservative	Rebecca Taylor	3,225	41.0	
New Democratic Party	James Finnie	980	12.5	

2013 Nova Scotia general election
Party	Candidate	Votes	%	±%
Liberal	Karen Casey	5,005	60.95	
Progressive Conservative	John Kendrick MacDonald	2,167	26.39	
New Democratic Party	Jim Wyatt	1,040	12.66	

2009 Nova Scotia general election
Party	Candidate	Votes	%	±%
Progressive Conservative	Karen Casey	3784	50.16	
New Democratic Party	Arthur Hartlen	2354	31.20	
Liberal	Lorenda Ebbett	1243	16.48	
Green	Judy Davis	176	2.35	

2006 Nova Scotia general election
Party	Candidate	Votes	%	±%
Progressive Conservative	Karen Casey	3809	50.96	
Liberal	Bob Taylor	1979	26.47	
New Democratic Party	Rob Assels	1511	20.21	
Green	Judy Davis	176	2.35	
