= Joel Matheson =

Canadian politician (born 1930)

The Honourable Joel R. Matheson ECNS

Member of the Legislative Assembly of Nova Scotia
- In office 1978–1993
- Preceded by: riding created
- Succeeded by: Gerry Fogarty
- Constituency: Halifax Bedford Basin

Personal details
- Born: February 18, 1930 (age 96) Halifax, Nova Scotia
- Party: Progressive Conservative
- Spouse: Ruth MacRobert
- Occupation: Lawyer

Joel Rand Matheson (born February 18, 1930) is a former lawyer, business owner and political figure in Nova Scotia. He represented Halifax Bedford Basin in the Nova Scotia House of Assembly from 1978 to 1993 as a Progressive Conservative.

== Early life and education ==
Matheson was born in Halifax, Nova Scotia, the son of Rand Matheson, and was educated in Moncton, New Brunswick, at St. Francis Xavier University and finally graduating with an LL.B. from Dalhousie University in 1954.

== Political career ==
Matheson served in the provincial cabinet as Minister of Finance, Minister of Mines and Energy, Minister of Health and Attorney General. He was defeated by Gerry Fogarty when he ran for reelection in 1993. Also in 1993, Matheson ran unsuccessfully in the federal riding of Halifax West as a Progressive Conservative, losing to Geoff Regan.

In 2009, he was named chairman of the board of directors for Canasur Gold.

1993 Canadian federal election: Halifax West
Party	Candidate	Votes	%	±%
Liberal	Geoff Regan	26 904	45.62	+7.01
Progressive Conservative	Joel Matheson	14 005	23.75	-21.00
Reform	Jim Donohue	11,439	19.40	
New Democratic	Sheila Richardson	4,952	8.40	-7.85
National	Kirby Judge	1,201	2.04	
Natural Law	Bernard Gormley	475	0.81	
Total valid votes		58,976	100.00	
Liberal gain from Progressive Conservative		Swing		+14.01

== Personal life ==
In 1953, he married Ruth MacRobert.
