= Mary Ann McGrath =

Canadian politician

MLA for Halifax Bedford Basin
- In office 1999–2003
- Preceded by: Gerry Fogarty
- Succeeded by: riding dissolved

Personal details
- Born: March 23, 1953 (age 73) Parrsboro, Nova Scotia
- Party: Progressive Conservative

Mary Ann McGrath (born March 23, 1953) is a Canadian politician. She represented the electoral district of Halifax Bedford Basin in the Nova Scotia House of Assembly from 1999 to 2003. She was a member of the Progressive Conservative Party of Nova Scotia.

McGrath was born in 1953 at Parrsboro, Nova Scotia, and educated at Saint Mary's University. McGrath entered provincial politics when she was elected MLA for Halifax Bedford Basin in the 1999 election. She served as a backbench MLA in John Hamm's government. McGrath ran in the new district of Halifax Clayton Park in the 2003 election, but lost to Liberal Diana Whalen by 295 votes. McGrath made another attempt at winning the seat in the 2006 election, but was again defeated by Whalen.
