= Ed Lorraine =

Canadian politician

MLA for Colchester North
- In office 1981–1984
- Preceded by: Bill Campbell
- Succeeded by: Jack Coupar
- In office 1988–1999
- Preceded by: Jack Coupar
- Succeeded by: Bill Langille

Personal details
- Born: April 15, 1928 Onslow, Nova Scotia
- Died: June 18, 2008 (aged 80)
- Party: Liberal
- Occupation: Farmer

Edward F. Lorraine (April 15, 1928 – June 18, 2008) was a Canadian politician and farmer. He represented the electoral district of Colchester North in the Nova Scotia House of Assembly from 1981 to 1984, and 1988 to 1999. He was a member of the Nova Scotia Liberal Party.

Born in Onslow, Colchester County, Nova Scotia, Lorraine was a cattle farmer who was elected to Colchester County Council in 1972, serving as warden from 1973 to 1981. He was first elected to the provincial legislature in 1981, winning the Colchester North riding by 11 votes. He was defeated in the 1984 election, but regained the seat in 1988. Lorraine was re-elected in 1993, and in 1997 was appointed to the Executive Council of Nova Scotia as Minister of Agriculture. He remained in that position following the 1998 election, and did not seek re-election in 1999. In 2004, Lorraine was named to the Atlantic Agricultural Hall of Fame.

Lorraine died on June 18, 2008, at the age of 80.
