= Colchester North (provincial electoral district) =

Provincial electoral district in Nova Scotia, Canada

Nova Scotia electoral district

Provincial electoral district
- Legislature: Nova Scotia House of Assembly
MLA
Tom Taggart
Progressive Conservative
- District created: 1978
- First contested: 1978
- Last contested: 2024

Demographics
- Population (2011): 18,238
- Electors: 13,879
- Area (km²): 2,249
- Pop. density (per km²): 8.1
- Census division: Colchester County

Colchester North is a provincial electoral district in Nova Scotia, Canada, that elects one member of the Nova Scotia House of Assembly. It was created in 1978 when the former district of Colchester was redistributed.

The Member of the Legislative Assembly is Tom Taggart of the Progressive Conservative Party of Nova Scotia, who replaced Karen Casey who had held the seat from 2006 to 2021 as both a Conservative and then a Liberal.

The riding includes the northern half of Colchester County. Communities include Debert, Great Village, and Tatamagouche.

== Geography ==
The land area of Colchester North is 2,249 km^{2} (868 sq mi).

== Members of the Legislative Assembly ==
This riding has elected the following members of the Legislative Assembly:

Colchester North
Legislature	Years	Member	Party
Riding created from Colchester
52nd	1978–1981	Bill Campbell	Progressive Conservative
53rd	1981–1984	Ed Lorraine	Liberal
54th	1984–1988	Jack Coupar	Progressive Conservative
55th	1988–1993	Ed Lorraine	Liberal
56th	1993–1998	Ed Lorraine	Liberal
57th	1998–1999	Ed Lorraine	Liberal
58th	1999–2003	Bill Langille	Progressive Conservative
59th	2003–2005	Bill Langille	Progressive Conservative
60th	2006–2009	Karen Casey	Progressive Conservative
61st	2009–2011	Karen Casey	Progressive Conservative
61st	2011–2013	Karen Casey	Liberal
62nd	2013–2017	Karen Casey	Liberal
63rd	2017–2021	Karen Casey	Liberal
64th	2021–2024	Tom Taggart	Progressive Conservative
65th	2024–present	Tom Taggart	Progressive Conservative

== Election results ==
=== 2024 ===
2024 Nova Scotia general election
Party	Candidate	Votes	%	±%
Progressive Conservative	Tom Taggart	4,282	67.79	14.61
New Democratic	Christina McCarron	1,062	16.81	5.47
Liberal	Dustin Rekunyk	828	13.11	-18.74
Green	Jillian Foster	145	2.30	-0.70
Total		6,317	–	
Source:Elections Nova Scotia

=== 2021 ===
2021 Nova Scotia general election
Party	Candidate	Votes	%	±%	Expenditures
Progressive Conservative	Tom Taggart	4,477	53.18	+12.14	$44,631.58
Liberal	Merlyn Smith	2,681	31.84	-14.65	$91,526.85
New Democratic	Sean Foley	955	11.34	-1.13	$36,616.11
Green	Ivan Drouin	252	2.99		$1,794.39
Atlantica	Stephan Sante	54	0.64		$200.00
Total valid votes/expense limit		8,419	99.67	+0.19	$86,863.25
Total rejected ballots		28	0.33	-0.19	
Turnout		8,447	56.67	+2.10	
Eligible voters		14,906			
Progressive Conservative gain from Liberal		Swing		+13.40	
Source: Elections Nova Scotia

=== 2017 ===
2017 provincial election redistributed results
Party	Vote	%
Liberal	3,654	46.49
Progressive Conservative	3,225	41.04
New Democratic	980	12.47

2017 Nova Scotia general election
Party	Candidate	Votes	%	±%
Liberal	Karen Casey	3,654	46.49	-14.50
Progressive Conservative	Rebecca Taylor	3,225	41.04	+14.68
New Democratic	James Finnie	980	12.47	-0.17
Total valid votes		7,859	99.48	
Total rejected ballots		41	0.52	-0.05
Turnout		7,900	54.57	-4.51
Eligible voters		14,476		
Liberal hold		Swing		-14.59
Source: Elections Nova Scotia

=== 2013 ===
2013 Nova Scotia general election
Party	Candidate	Votes	%	±%
Liberal	Karen Casey	5,003	61.00%	44.52%
Progressive Conservative	John K. MacDonald	2,162	26.36%	-23.89%
New Democratic	Jim Wyatt	1,037	12.64%	-18.50%
Total valid votes		8,202	99.43	
Total rejected ballots		47	0.57	
Turnout		8,249	59.09	
Eligible voters		13,961		
Source(s) Source: Nova Scotia Legislature (2024). "Electoral History for Colchester North" (PDF). nslegislature.ca. Nova Scotia, Chief Electoral Officer (2013). 39th Provincial General Election, October 8, 2013: Volume 1 – Statement of Votes & Statistics (PDF) (Report). Elections Nova Scotia. Archived from the original (PDF) on 10 April 2018.

=== 2009 ===
2009 Nova Scotia general election
Party	Candidate	Votes	%	±%
Progressive Conservative	Karen Casey	3,811	50.25%	-1.29%
New Democratic	Arthur Hartlen	2,362	31.14%	11.17%
Liberal	Lorenda Ebbett	1,250	16.48%	-9.68%
Green	Judy Davis	161	2.12%	-0.20%
Total		7,584	–	
Source(s) Source: Nova Scotia Legislature (2024). "Electoral History for Colchester North" (PDF). nslegislature.ca.

=== 2006 ===
2006 Nova Scotia general election
Party	Candidate	Votes	%	±%
Progressive Conservative	Karen Casey	3,899	51.54%	6.42%
Liberal	Bob Taylor	1,979	26.16%	-3.47%
New Democratic	Rob Assels	1,511	19.97%	-5.27%
Green	Judy Davis	176	2.33%	–
Total		7,565	–	
Source(s) Source: Nova Scotia Legislature (2024). "Electoral History for Colchester North" (PDF). nslegislature.ca.

=== 2003 ===
2003 Nova Scotia general election
Party	Candidate	Votes	%	±%
Progressive Conservative	Bill Langille	3,324	45.12%	0.81%
Liberal	John Davidson	2,183	29.63%	2.60%
New Democratic	Garfield Forrest	1,860	25.25%	-3.41%
Total		7,367	–	
Source(s) Source: Nova Scotia Legislature (2024). "Electoral History for Colchester North" (PDF). nslegislature.ca.

=== 1999 ===
1999 Nova Scotia general election
Party	Candidate	Votes	%	±%
Progressive Conservative	Bill Langille	3,728	44.31%	14.54%
New Democratic	Ralph Martin	2,411	28.66%	-2.44%
Liberal	John Davidson	2,274	27.03%	-12.10%
Total		8,413	–	
Source(s) Source: Nova Scotia Legislature (2024). "Electoral History for Colchester North" (PDF). nslegislature.ca. Nova Scotia, Chief Electoral Officer (1999). Returns of the General Election for the House of Assembly, Thirty-Fifth General Election (Report). Elections Nova Scotia.

=== 1998 ===
1998 Nova Scotia general election
Party	Candidate	Votes	%	±%
Liberal	Ed Lorraine	3,301	39.13%	-15.14%
New Democratic	Janet Maybee	2,623	31.10%	20.40%
Progressive Conservative	Andy Williamson	2,511	29.77%	-5.26%
Total		8,435	–	
Source(s) Source: Nova Scotia Legislature (2024). "Electoral History for Colchester North" (PDF). nslegislature.ca.

=== 1993 ===
1993 Nova Scotia general election
Party	Candidate	Votes	%	±%
Liberal	Ed Lorraine	5,123	54.27%	7.64%
Progressive Conservative	Tom Taggart	3,306	35.02%	-9.82%
New Democratic	Patsy Forrest	1,010	10.70%	2.18%
Total		9,439	–	
Source(s) Source: Nova Scotia Legislature (2024). "Electoral History for Colchester North" (PDF). nslegislature.ca. Nova Scotia, Chief Electoral Officer (1993). Returns of the General Election for the House of Assembly, Thirty-Third General Election (PDF) (Report). Queen's Printer. Archived from the original (PDF) on 18 June 2018.

=== 1988 ===
1988 Nova Scotia general election
Party	Candidate	Votes	%	±%
Liberal	Ed Lorraine	4,260	46.63%	1.95%
Progressive Conservative	Jack Coupar	4,097	44.85%	-1.80%
New Democratic	Penny Marchbank	778	8.52%	-0.16%
Total		9,135	–	
Source(s) Source: Nova Scotia Legislature (2024). "Electoral History for Colchester North" (PDF). nslegislature.ca. Nova Scotia, Chief Electoral Officer (1988). Returns of the General Election for the House of Assembly, Thirty-Second General Election (PDF) (Report). Queen's Printer. Archived from the original (PDF) on 7 July 2018.

=== 1984 ===
1984 Nova Scotia general election
Party	Candidate	Votes	%	±%
Progressive Conservative	Jack Coupar	3,796	46.65%	4.25%
Liberal	Ed Lorraine	3,636	44.68%	2.13%
New Democratic	Allan M. Marchbank	706	8.68%	-6.38%
Total		8,138	–	
Source(s) Source: Nova Scotia Legislature (2024). "Electoral History for Colchester North" (PDF). nslegislature.ca. Nova Scotia, Chief Electoral Officer (1984). Returns of the General Election for the House of Assembly, Thirty-First General Election (PDF) (Report). Queen's Printer. Archived from the original (PDF) on 31 July 2017.

=== 1981 ===
1981 Nova Scotia general election
Party	Candidate	Votes	%	±%
Liberal	Ed Lorraine	3,182	42.55%	-0.75%
Progressive Conservative	Bill Campbell	3,171	42.40%	-6.97%
New Democratic	Allan M. Marchbank	1,126	15.06%	7.72%
Total		7,479	–	
Source(s) Source: Nova Scotia Legislature (2024). "Electoral History for Colchester North" (PDF). nslegislature.ca. Nova Scotia, Chief Electoral Officer (1981). Returns of the General Election for the House of Assembly, Thirtieth General Election (PDF) (Report). Queen's Printer. Archived from the original (PDF) on 31 July 2017.

=== 1978 ===
1978 Nova Scotia general election
Party	Candidate	Votes	%	±%
Progressive Conservative	Bill Campbell	3,447	49.37%	–
Liberal	Floyd Tucker	3,023	43.30%	–
New Democratic	Peter Robben	512	7.33%	–
Total		6,982	–	
Source(s) Source: Nova Scotia Legislature (2024). "Electoral History for Colchester North" (PDF). nslegislature.ca. Nova Scotia, Chief Electoral Officer (1978). Returns of the General Election for the House of Assembly, Twenty-Ninth General Election (PDF) (Report). Queen's Printer. Archived from the original (PDF) on 18 June 2018.

== See also ==
- List of Nova Scotia provincial electoral districts
- Canadian provincial electoral districts
