= Paul Kimball =

Canadian filmmaker

Paul Andrew Kimball
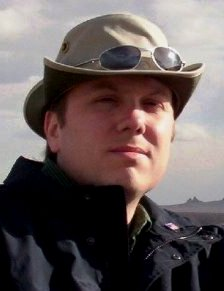
- Education: Dalhousie University (Juris Doctor); Acadia University (B.A.)
- Occupations: Filmmaker, author
- Television: Haunted (Eastlink TV)
- Political party: Progressive Conservative Association of Nova Scotia
- Website: paulandrewkimball.com

Paul Andrew Kimball (born January 2, 1967) is a Canadian film and television producer, writer and director, and politician, who resides in Halifax, Nova Scotia. Kimball's projects include several documentary films about UFOs.

== Education ==
Kimball graduated as a University Scholar from Acadia University in 1989 with an Honors degree in history and political science, and then from the Schulich School of Law at Dalhousie University in 1992.

== Career ==
From 1992 until 1997 he worked as a musician and producer in Halifax, founding both Tall Poppies and Julia's Rain. In 1997, Kimball was employed as a special consultant by Halifax-based film production company Salter Street Films. He then served as the Program Administrator for the Nova Scotia Film Development Corporation until May 1999, after which he founded the Halifax-based film and television production company Redstar Films Limited. Kimball has served as the President of the Nova Scotia Film and Television Producers Association, a member of the Nova Scotia Film Advisory Committee, and was a founding member of the Motion Picture Industry Association of Nova Scotia. He has also worked as a consultant on the film and television industry to the governments of Prince Edward Island and Newfoundland and Labrador.

=== Film and television ===
As a film and television producer / writer / director since 1999, Kimball has created over a dozen documentaries on a wide range of subjects for myriad networks, including Space, Bravo, Vision TV, CBC, TVNZ, SCN, Knowledge Network, EastLink TV, UFO TV, and TrueVisions. These include paranormal-themed films such as Stanton T. Friedman is Real (2002), Fields of Fear (2006), and Best Evidence: Top 10 UFO Sightings (2007). In 2008–09, he wrote, directed, produced and hosted the television series Ghost Cases in Canada for EastLink TV. He also wrote, produced and directed two seasons of the television series The Classical Now (2003–2005), the classical music documentary Denise Djokic: Seven Days Seven Nights (2003) which featured renowned Canadian cellist Denise Djokic, and the performance film Synchronicity (2008), all for Bravo (Canada). Kimball's first feature film, Eternal Kiss, was released in 2010 and screened at the Atlantic Film Festival. His second feature film, the supernatural thriller The Cuckoo and the Clock, and his third feature Roundabout were released in 2014. Kimball's fourth feature Exit Thread was released in 2016.

=== Theater ===
In 2007 Kimball adapted and directed a version of the Peter Weiss play Marat / Sade. Kimball followed Marat / Sade later in the year with the science fiction play Doing Time, which he co-wrote with American author Mac Tonnies. It premiered in November in Halifax, Nova Scotia to positive reviews. Kimball also directed Doing Time at the 2008 Boulder International Fringe Festival.

=== Politics ===
In June 2016, Kimball announced he was attempting to enter provincial politics by seeking the Progressive Conservative nomination in the riding of Halifax Needham. In July 2016, he lost the nomination, finishing third on the first ballot. In October 2016, Kimball was nominated as the Progressive Conservative candidate in Clayton Park West for the 2017 general election. On election night, Kimball finished second with 26% of the vote to Liberal candidate Rafah DiCostanzo.

== Paranormal research ==
A number of Kimball's documentaries have dealt with paranormal themes, including the UFO phenomenon, ghosts, and cryptozoology. Since 2005 he has maintained a blog about various paranormal subjects called The Other Side of Truth. His first book, The Other Side of Truth: The Paranormal, The Art of the Imagination, and The Human Condition, was published in October 2012, by Redstar Books. Kimball is the nephew of prominent ufologist Stanton Friedman, but is skeptical of extraterrestrial visitation as an explanation for the UFO phenomenon, and is a vocal critic of the Exopolitics movement, a stance which has generated controversy among believers in the Extraterrestrial hypothesis.

Kimball posits that the paranormal could be our interaction with an advanced non-human intelligence who may be pulling things out of our own minds and presenting it back to us in ways that we will understand. This accounts for why tales of the paranormal have changed over various eras, from dragons to spaceships. Whoever is presenting these images is trying to appeal to a particular audience in a specific time frame. He theorizes that most paranormal phenomena is a kind of artistic creation by this non-human intelligence. It may be part of a teaching or preparation process, whereby humans are encouraged to move up to the next level of development or think about things in a broader way. He has drawn links between the paranormal and various strands of spiritualism and mysticism, including the experiences of Jakob Böhme, William Blake and Henry Alline.

Kimball also hosts a podcast called The Other Side of Truth, where he has interviewed a wide range of people primarily about paranormal-themed subjects, including UFO researchers Kevin Randle, Nick Pope, and Stanton Friedman, historian and author Aaron John Gulyas, filmmaker Paul Davids, and scientist and consciousness researcher Dean Radin. Kimball has appeared as a guest on numerous radio programs, including Coast to Coast AM with George Noory, Radio Misterioso, and Binnall of America. He is a former co-host of the syndicated radio program The Paracast.

== Filmography ==
- Eternal Kiss (2010) – Writer / Director / Producer
- The Cuckoo in the Clock (2014) – Writer / Director / Producer / Editor
- Roundabout (2014) – Writer / Director / Producer / Editor
- Exit Thread (2016) – Writer / Director / Producer / Editor
- Aliens With Knives (2018) – Executive Producer
- The Last Divide (2018) – Executive Producer
- Creepy Crawling (2018) – Executive Producer
- Shadow In The Mirror (2018) – Executive Producer / Editor

== Television ==
- Stanton T. Friedman Is Real! (2002)
- Denise Djokic: Seven Days Seven Nights (2003)
- The Classical Now (2004–2005, 26 episodes)
- Do You Believe in Majic? (2004)
- Aztec: 1948 (2004)
- Fields of Fear (2006)
- Best Evidence: Top 10 UFO Sightings (2007)
- Synchronicity (2008)
- Ghost Cases (13 episodes, 2009–2010)
- Haunted (26 episodes, 2017–2018)
- Cinema 902 (13 episodes, 2017–2018)
- Stand & Deliver (13 episodes, 2018)

== Books ==
- The Other Side of Truth, October 2012, 250 pages. Halifax: Redstar Books. ISBN 978-0-9916975-0-2

== Music ==
- Julia's Rain – Wonderful Broken Silence compilation video (2012)
- Tall Poppies – All Points In Between compilation video (2012)

== Podcast ==
- The Other Side of Truth
