= Preston (electoral district) =

Provincial electoral district in Nova Scotia, Canada

Nova Scotia electoral district

Provincial electoral district
- Legislature: Nova Scotia House of Assembly
MLA
Twila Grosse
Progressive Conservative
- District created: 1991, 2019
- First contested: 1993
- Last contested: 2024

Demographics
- Population (2006): 10,024
- Electors: 7,680
- Area (km²): 164
- Pop. density (per km²): 61.1
- Census division: Halifax Regional Municipality

Preston is a provincial electoral district in the Halifax Regional Municipality in Nova Scotia, Canada. It has existed from 1993 to 2013 and since 2021 and elects one member of the Nova Scotia House of Assembly.

The electoral district includes the majority African Nova Scotian communities of North Preston and East Preston, plus the communities of Cherry Brook, Lake Loon, Lake Echo, Mineville, Montague Gold Mines, Westphal, and part of the Tam O'Shanter Ridge neighbourhood of Dartmouth.

The electoral district was created in 1991 and was conceived to provide representation to the area's rural Black community. The electoral district was abolished following the 2012 electoral boundary review when the provincial government wanted all of the province's ridings to have equal representation. It was largely replaced by the new electoral district of Preston-Dartmouth. The riding was re-created following the 2019 boundary review, mostly out of Preston-Dartmouth, but also out of parts of Waverley-Fall River-Beaver Bank, Cole Harbour-Portland Valley, Eastern Shore and a small part of Colchester-Musquodoboit Valley. The riding was reinstated after a court challenge that also re-instated the province's three protected Acadians ridings.

It was the first riding in all of Nova Scotia to feature an entirely African Nova Scotian slate of candidates in the 2021 provincial election.

== Geography ==
Preston covers 164 km^{2} (63 sq mi) of land area.

== Members of the Legislative Assembly ==
The electoral district was represented by the following members of the Legislative Assembly:

Preston
Legislature	Years	Member	Party
Riding recreated from parts of Halifax Eastern Shore, Cole Harbour and Bedford-Musquodoboit Valley.
56th	1993–1998	Wayne Adams	Liberal
57th	1998–1999	Yvonne Atwell	New Democratic
58th	1999–2003	David Hendsbee	Progressive Conservative
59th	2003–2006	Keith Colwell	Liberal
60th	2006–2009	Keith Colwell	Liberal
61st	2009–2013	Keith Colwell	Liberal
Riding dissolved into Preston-Dartmouth and Dartmouth East
Riding recreated from parts of Preston-Dartmouth, Waverley-Fall River-Beaver Bank, Cole Harbour-Portland Valley, Eastern Shore, and Colchester-Musquodoboit Valley.
64th	2021–2023	Angela Simmonds	Liberal
64th	2023–2024	Twila Grosse	Progressive Conservative
65th	2024–present	Twila Grosse	Progressive Conservative

== Election results ==
=== 2024 ===
2024 Nova Scotia general election
Party	Candidate	Votes	%	±%
Progressive Conservative	Twila Grosse	2,139	51.41	+6.18
New Democratic	Colter (C.C.) Simmonds	1,214	29.18	+2.62
Liberal	Carlo Simmons	739	17.76	-5.92
Green	Andre Anderson	69	1.66	-0.68
Total		4,161	–	
Total rejected ballots		43		
Turnout		4,205	37.88	
Eligible voters		11,100		
Progressive Conservative hold		Swing		
Source: Elections Nova Scotia

=== 2023 by-election ===
Nova Scotia provincial by-election, August 8, 2023 Resignation of Angela Simmonds
Party	Candidate	Votes	%	±%	Expenditures
Progressive Conservative	Twila Grosse	1,950	45.22	+16.53	$49,241.83
New Democratic	Colter Simmonds	1,145	26.55	-1.37	$70,390.30
Liberal	Carlo Simmons	1,021	23.68	-19.71	$46,215.10
Green	Anthony Edmonds	101	2.34	–	$930.16
Nova Scotians United	Bobby Taylor	95	2.20	–	$5,782.79
Total valid votes/Expense limit		4,312	99.29	–	$76,489.21
Total rejected ballots		31	0.71	-0.08	
Turnout		4,343	38.79	-7.56	
Eligible voters		11,195			
Progressive Conservative gain from Liberal		Swing		+18.12	
Source: Elections Nova Scotia

=== 2021 ===
2021 Nova Scotia general election
Party	Candidate	Votes	%	±%	Expenditures
Liberal	Angela Simmonds	2,226	43.38	-5.65	$32,830.44
Progressive Conservative	Archy Beals	1,472	28.69	+6.00	$22,433.28
New Democratic	Colter C.C. Simmonds	1,433	27.93	+4.36	$34,576.51
Total valid votes/expense limit		5,131	99.21	–	$67,272.14
Total rejected ballots		41	0.79		
Turnout		5,172	46.36		
Eligible voters		11,157			
Liberal notional hold		Swing		-5.82	
Source: Elections Nova Scotia

2017 provincial election redistributed results
Party	Vote	%
Liberal	2,418	49.04
New Democratic	1,162	23.57
Progressive Conservative	1,119	22.69
Green	231	4.68
Independent	1	0.02

=== 2009 ===
2009 Nova Scotia general election
Party	Candidate	Votes	%	±%
Liberal	Keith Colwell	1,888	43.57%	1.34%
New Democratic	Janet Sutcliffe	1,314	30.33%	11.11%
Progressive Conservative	Dwayne Provo	1,076	24.83%	-11.86%
Green	Sarah Densmore	55	1.27%	-0.60%
Total		4,333	–	
Source(s) Source: Nova Scotia Legislature (2024). "Electoral History for Preston" (PDF). nslegislature.ca.

=== 2006 ===
2006 Nova Scotia general election
Party	Candidate	Votes	%	±%
Liberal	Keith Colwell	1,853	42.23%	8.25%
Progressive Conservative	Dwayne Provo	1,610	36.69%	3.92%
New Democratic	Douglas M. Sparks	843	19.21%	-12.84%
Green	David C. Farrell	82	1.87%	–
Total		4,388	–	
Source(s) Source: Nova Scotia Legislature (2024). "Electoral History for Preston" (PDF). nslegislature.ca.

=== 2003 ===
2003 Nova Scotia general election
Party	Candidate	Votes	%	±%
Liberal	Keith Colwell	1,411	33.98%	20.60%
Progressive Conservative	David Hendsbee	1,361	32.77%	-14.53%
New Democratic	Doug Sparks	1,331	32.05%	-7.27%
Marijuana	Marc-Boris St-Maurice	50	1.20%	–
Total		4,153	–	
Source(s) Source: Nova Scotia Legislature (2024). "Electoral History for Preston" (PDF). nslegislature.ca.

=== 1999 ===
1999 Nova Scotia general election
Party	Candidate	Votes	%	±%
Progressive Conservative	David Hendsbee	1,800	47.31%	27.74%
New Democratic	Yvonne Atwell	1,496	39.32%	-3.67%
Liberal	Wendell Thomas	509	13.38%	-24.07%
Total		3,805	–	
Source(s) Source: Nova Scotia Legislature (2024). "Electoral History for Preston" (PDF). nslegislature.ca. Nova Scotia, Chief Electoral Officer (1999). Returns of the General Election for the House of Assembly, Thirty-Fifth General Election (Report). Elections Nova Scotia.

=== 1998 ===
1998 Nova Scotia general election
Party	Candidate	Votes	%	±%
New Democratic	Yvonne Atwell	1,777	42.99%	30.95%
Liberal	Wayne Adams	1,548	37.45%	-1.13%
Progressive Conservative	Ross D. Isenor	809	19.57%	-1.37%
Total		4,134	–	
Source(s) Source: Nova Scotia Legislature (2024). "Electoral History for Preston" (PDF). nslegislature.ca.

=== 1993 ===
1993 Nova Scotia general election
Party	Candidate	Votes	%	±%
Liberal	Wayne Adams	1,872	38.57%	–
Independent	David Hendsbee	1,381	28.46%	–
Progressive Conservative	Darryl Gray	1,016	20.94%	–
New Democratic	Yvonne Atwell	584	12.03%	–
Total		4,853	–	
Source(s) Source: Nova Scotia Legislature (2024). "Electoral History for Preston" (PDF). nslegislature.ca. Nova Scotia, Chief Electoral Officer (1993). Returns of the General Election for the House of Assembly, Thirty-Third General Election (PDF) (Report). Queen's Printer. Archived from the original (PDF) on 18 June 2018.

== See also ==
- List of Nova Scotia provincial electoral districts
- Canadian provincial electoral districts
