= 2009 Nova Scotia general election =

Canadian provincial election

- June 9, 2009

52 seats of the Nova Scotia House of Assembly 27 seats were needed for a majority
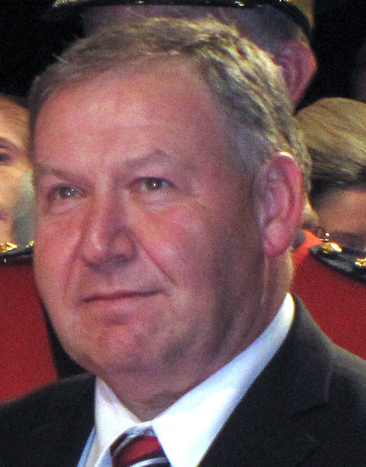

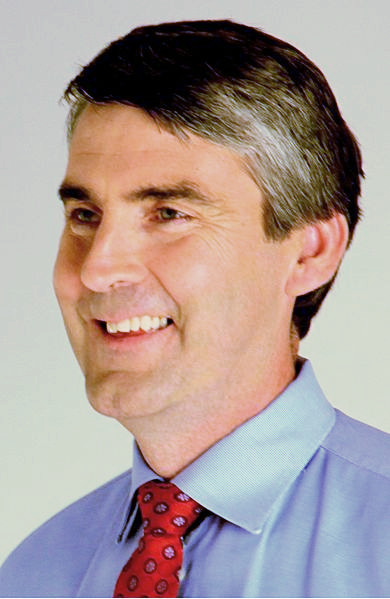

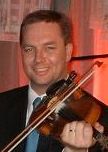
	First party	Second party	Third party
Leader	Darrell Dexter	Stephen McNeil	Rodney MacDonald
Party	New Democratic	Liberal	Progressive Conservative
Leader since	June 2, 2002	April 28, 2007	February 11, 2006
Leader's seat	Cole Harbour	Annapolis	Inverness
Last election	20 seats, 34.63%	9 seats, 23.44%	23 seats, 39.57%
Seats won	31	11	10
Seat change	▲11	▲2	▼13
Popular vote	186,556	112,160	101,203
Percentage	45.24%	27.20%	24.54%
Swing	▲10.61%	▲3.76%	▼15.03%
- Popular vote by riding. As this is an FPTP election, seat totals are not determined by popular vote, but instead via results by each riding.
Premier before election
Rodney MacDonald
Progressive Conservative
Premier after election
Darrell Dexter
New Democratic

The 2009 Nova Scotia general election was held on June 9, 2009 to elect members of the 61st House of Assembly of the Province of Nova Scotia, Canada. The government was defeated on a money bill on May 4, and the Nova Scotia House of Assembly was dissolved by Lieutenant Governor Mayann Francis on May 5. thereby triggering an election. The NDP won a majority government, forming government the first time in the province's history, and for the first time in an Atlantic Canadian province. The governing Progressive Conservatives were reduced to third place.

== Campaign ==
The election campaign began on May 5, 2009, after the New Democrats and Liberals voted against the Offshore Offset Revenues Expenditure Act, legislation that would have permitted the government to divert its revenues from oil and gas development in the Atlantic Ocean from debt payment, as required under current provincial law, to fund extra spending in the 2009 budget. As the Progressive Conservatives won only a minority government in the 2006 election, at least one of the two opposition parties would have been required to vote in favour of (or abstain from voting on) the legislation for it to pass.

== Timeline ==
- June 13, 2006 - Rodney MacDonald's Progressive Conservatives are elected to a minority government.
- June 20, 2006 - Liberal leader Francis MacKenzie resigns.
- February 20, 2007 - Cumberland North MLA Ernie Fage is suspended from the Progressive Conservative caucus after Halifax Police charge him with failing to remain at the scene of an accident, following an incident in November 2006.
- March 1, 2007 - NDP MLA Kevin Deveaux resigns his seat of Cole Harbour-Eastern Passage.
- April 28, 2007 - Stephen McNeil is elected leader of the Nova Scotia Liberal Party.
- October 2, 2007 - Becky Kent of the NDP is elected in the Cole Harbour-Eastern Passage byelection.
- December 18, 2007 - Fage is convicted of leaving the scene of an accident, and is expelled from the Progressive Conservative caucus.
- March 2, 2009 - Lunenburg MLA and Finance Minister Michael Baker dies.
- May 4, 2009 - Government is defeated on a budget bill (Bill 240 - Offshore Offset Revenues Expenditure Act (amendments to Provincial finance Act)).
- May 5, 2009 - Legislature is officially dissolved and election is called for June 9, 2009.

↓
31	11	10
New Democratic	Liberal	Progressive Conservative

=== Results by party ===
Results
Party	Votes	%	Seats			
Party	Votes	%	2006	Dissolution	Elected	Change
New Democratic	186,556	45.24	20	20	31	+11
Liberal	112,160	27.20	9	9	11	+2
Progressive Conservative	101,203	24.54	23	21	10	-13
Green	9,636	2.34	0	0	0	±0
Independents	2,796	0.68	0	1	0	±0
Vacant			–	1	–	–
Total	412,351	100.00	52	52	52	±0

Candidates lined up.

Popular vote
New Democratic	45.24%
Liberal	27.20%
PC	24.54%
Others	3.02%

Seats summary
New Democratic	59.62%
Liberal	21.15%
PC	19.23%

=== Results by region ===
Party name		HRM	C.B.	Valley	S. Shore	Fundy	Central	Total
Parties winning seats in the legislature
New Democratic Party	Seats:	14	2	2	5	4	4	31
New Democratic Party	Popular vote:	54.07%	40.16%	27.05%	43.03%	41.76%	50.10%	45.26%
Liberal	Seats:	4	3	4	-	-	-	11
Liberal	Popular vote:	28.65%	29.57%	46.46%	18.11%	14.60%	16.84%	27.22%
Progressive Conservative	Seats:	-	4	1	2	2	1	10
Progressive Conservative	Popular vote:	14.36%	28.34%	23.89%	36.08%	37.44%	31.32%	24.52%
Parties not winning seats in the legislature
Green	Popular vote:	2.88%	1.78%	2.60%	1.90%	1.89%	1.74%	2.33%
Independents	Popular vote:	0.03%	0.14%	N/A	0.88%	4.32%	N/A	0.67%
Total seats:		18	9	7	7	6	5	52

== Retiring incumbents ==
Progressive Conservative

- Brooke Taylor, Colchester-Musquodoboit Valley
- Jamie Muir, Truro-Bible Hill

== Nominated candidates ==
Legend
bold denotes party leader
† denotes an incumbent who is not running for re-election or was defeated in nomination contest

=== Annapolis Valley ===
Electoral district	Candidates					Incumbent
Electoral district	PC	NDP	Liberal	Green	Independent	Incumbent
Annapolis	Kent Robinson; 971; 11.10%	Henry Spurr; 1,131; 12.93%	**Stephen McNeil**; 6,446; 73.70%	Jamie Spinney; 198; 2.26%		Stephen McNeil
Clare	Jimmy Doucet; 459; 8.75%	Paul Comeau; 1,326; 25.29%	Wayne Gaudet; 3,392; 64.68%	Diane Doucet-Bean; 67; 1.28%		Wayne Gaudet
Digby-Annapolis	Cindy Nesbitt; 852; 15.39%	Sherri Oliver; 1,092; 19.73%	Harold Theriault; 3,514; 63.48%	Namron Bean; 78; 1.41%		Harold Theriault
Hants West	Chuck Porter; 3,364; 37.24%	Barbara Gallagher; 2,401; 26.58%	Paula Lunn; 3,065; 33.93%	Sheila Richardson; 204; 2.26%		Chuck Porter
Kings North	Mark Parent; 3,079; 36.08%	Jim Morton; 3,535; 41.43%	Shirley Fisher; 1,541; 18.06%	Anna-Maria Galante-Ward; 378; 4.43%		Mark Parent
Kings South	David Morse; 2,759; 28.14%	Ramona Jennex; 4,038; 41.18%	Paula Howatt; 2,639; 26.91%	Brendan MacNeill; 369; 3.76%		David Morse
Kings West	Chris Palmer; 1,667; 20.20%	Carol Tobin; 1,422; 17.23%	Leo Glavine; 5,015; 60.77%	Nistal Prem de Boer; 149; 1.81%		Leo Glavine

=== South Shore ===
Electoral district	Candidates					Incumbent
Electoral district	PC	NDP	Liberal	Green	Independent	Incumbent
Argyle	Chris d'Entremont; 3,158; 67.65%	Melvin Huskins; 66; 1.41%	Lionel LeBlanc; 913; 19.56%	Barbara Lake; 531; 11.38%		Chris d'Entremont
Chester-St. Margaret's	Judy Streatch; 2,762; 27.47%	Denise Peterson-Rafuse; 4,835; 48.09%	Jo-Ann Grant; 2,122; 21.11%	Ryan Cameron; 335; 3.33%		Judy Streatch
Lunenburg	Peter Zwicker; 2,399; 28.30%	Pam Birdsall; 4,069; 48.01%	Rick Welsford; 1,374; 16.21%	Jason A. Remai; 145; 1.71%	Milton Countway; 489; 5.77%	Vacant
Lunenburg West	Carolyn Bolivar-Getson; 3,045; 33.50%	Gary Ramey; 3,600; 39.60%	Mark Furey; 2,297; 25.27%	Emily Richardson; 148; 1.63%		Carolyn Bolivar-Getson
Queens	Kerry Morash; 1,936; 28.87%	Vicki Conrad; 4,012; 59.82%	Wayne Henley; 674; 10.05%	Stuart Simpson; 85; 1.27%		Vicki Conrad
Shelburne	Eddie Nickerson; 1,637; 23.59%	Sterling Belliveau; 3,844; 55.41%	Darian Huskilson; 1,356; 19.54%	Robin Smith; 101; 1.46%		Sterling Belliveau
Yarmouth	Richard Hurlburt; 4,537; 61.34%	David Olie; 1,696; 22.93%	David Mooney; 1,041; 14.07%	Ronald Mills; 123; 1.66%		Richard Hurlburt

=== Fundy-Northeast ===
Electoral district	Candidates					Incumbent
Electoral district	PC	NDP	Liberal	Green	Independent	Incumbent
Colchester-Musquodoboit Valley	Steve Streatch; 2,265; 29.07%	Gary Burrill; 3,697; 47.45%	Willie Versteeg; 1,649; 21.16%	Margaret Whitney; 181; 2.32%		Brooke Taylor†
Colchester North	Karen Casey; 3,811; 50.25%	Arthur Hartlen; 2,362; 31.14%	Lorenda Ebbett; 1,250; 16.48%	Judy Davis; 161; 2.12%		Karen Casey
Cumberland North	Keith Hunter; 1,359; 17.23%	Brian Skabar; 3,170; 40.19%	Brent Noiles; 1,073; 13.60%	Aviva Silburt; 127; 1.61%	Ernest Fage; 2,159; 27.37%	Ernest Fage
Cumberland South	Murray Scott; 4,334; 67.66%	Don Tabor; 1,659; 25.90%	Joseph Archibald; 325; 5.07%	Danny Melvin; 88; 1.37%		Murray Scott
Hants East	Todd Williams; 1,567; 16.82%	John MacDonell; 6,052; 64.96%	Maurice Rees; 1,467; 15.75%	Emerich Winkler; 231; 2.48%		John MacDonell
Truro-Bible Hill	Hughie MacIsaac; 2,544; 30.23%	Lenore Zann; 4,070; 48.37%	Bob Hagell; 1,643; 19.52%	Kaleigh Brinkhurst; 158; 1.88%		Jamie Muir†

=== Central Halifax ===
Electoral district	Candidates					Incumbent
Electoral district	PC	NDP	Liberal	Green	Independent	Incumbent
Halifax Chebucto	David Atchison; 544; 6.91%	Howard Epstein; 4,446; 56.47%	Jane Spurr; 2,535; 32.20%	Chris Hanlon; 348; 4.42%		Howard Epstein
Halifax Citadel	Ted Larsen; 1,000; 12.99%	Leonard Preyra; 3,785; 49.17%	Gerry Walsh; 2,584; 33.57%	**Ryan Watson**; 329; 4.27%		Leonard Preyra
Halifax Clayton Park	Debbie Hum; 1,084; 10.56%	Linda Power; 3,924; 38.24%	Diana Whalen; 5,030; 49.02%	Amanda Hester; 172; 1.68%	Jonathan Dean; 51; 0.50%	Diana Whalen
Halifax Fairview	Paul Henderson; 893; 12.16%	Graham Steele; 4,680; 63.71%	Brad Armitage; 1,544; 21.02%	Jane Hester; 229; 3.12%		Graham Steele
Halifax Needham	Jason Cameron; 536; 6.76%	Maureen MacDonald; 5,336; 67.30%	Graham Estabrooks; 1,690; 21.31%	Kris MacLellan; 367; 4.63%		Maureen MacDonald

=== Suburban Halifax ===
Electoral district	Candidates					Incumbent
Electoral district	PC	NDP	Liberal	Green	Independent	Incumbent
Bedford-Birch Cove	Len Goucher; 2,268; 20.75%	Brian Mosher; 3,552; 32.50%	Kelly Regan; 4,861; 44.48%	Neil Green; 248; 2.27%		Len Goucher
Halifax Atlantic	Brian Phillips; 965; 11.22%	Michèle Raymond; 5,253; 61.09%	Jim Hoskins; 2,003; 23.29%	Anthony Rosborough; 378; 4.40%		Michele Raymond
Hammonds Plains-Upper Sackville	Barry Barnet; 2,218; 23.05%	Mat Whynott; 4,815; 50.03%	Patrick Doyle; 2,381; 24.74%	Shawn Redmond; 210; 2.18%		Barry Barnet
Sackville-Cobequid	Jessica Alexander; 976; 12.46%	Dave Wilson; 5,120; 65.34%	Scott Hemming; 1,548; 19.75%	Ian Charles; 192; 2.45%		Dave Wilson
Timberlea-Prospect	Gina Byrne; 795; 9.10%	Bill Estabrooks; 6,174; 70.70%	Lisa Mullin; 1,535; 17.58%	Thomas Trappenberg; 229; 2.62%		Bill Estabrooks
Waverley-Fall River-Beaver Bank	Gary Hines; 1,696; 18.45%	Percy Paris; 5,007; 54.47%	Bill Horne; 2,290; 24.91%	Damon Loomer; 199; 2.16%		Percy Paris

=== Dartmouth/Cole Harbour/Eastern Shore ===
Electoral district	Candidates					Incumbent
Electoral district	PC	NDP	Liberal	Green	Independent	Incumbent
Cole Harbour	Mike Josey; 939; 11.05%	**Darrell Dexter**; 5,849; 68.82%	Tony Ince; 1,509; 17.76%	Donna Toews; 202; 2.38%		Darrell Dexter
Cole Harbour-Eastern Passage	Lloyd Jackson; 1,074; 15.90%	Becky Kent; 4,402; 65.17%	Orest Ulan; 1,054; 15.60%	Denise Ménard; 225; 3.33%		Becky Kent
Dartmouth East	Bert Thompson; 873; 9.60%	Joan Massey; 3,908; 42.95%	Andrew Younger; 4,133; 45.43%	Anna Mukpo; 184; 2.02%		Joan Massey
Dartmouth North	David Losey; 568; 7.95%	Trevor Zinck; 4,053; 56.75%	Jim Smith; 2,316; 32.43%	Alex Donaldson; 205; 2.87%		Trevor Zinck
Dartmouth South-Portland Valley	George Jordan; 1,389; 13.58%	Marilyn More; 5,583; 54.59%	Colin Hebb; 2,946; 28.80%	David Croft; 310; 3.03%		Marilyn More
Eastern Shore	Bill Dooks; 2,557; 34.69%	Sid Prest; 3,628; 49.22%	Loretta Day Halleran; 992; 13.46%	Michael Marshall; 194; 2.63%		Bill Dooks
Preston	Dwayne Provo; 1,076; 24.83%	Janet Sutcliffe; 1,314; 30.33%	Keith Colwell; 1,888; 43.57%	Sarah Densmore; 55; 1.27%		Keith Colwell

=== Central Nova ===
Electoral district	Candidates					Incumbent
Electoral district	PC	NDP	Liberal	Green	Independent	Incumbent
Antigonish	Angus MacIsaac; 3,613; 38.08%	Maurice Smith; 3,338; 35.18%	Miles Tompkins; 2,378; 25.06%	Rebecca Mosher; 160; 1.69%		Angus MacIsaac
Guysborough-Sheet Harbour	Ron Chisholm; 1,750; 24.96%	Jim Boudreau; 3,621; 51.64%	Lloyd Hines; 1,558; 22.22%	Amy Florian; 83; 1.18%		Ron Chisholm
Pictou Centre	Pat Dunn; 3,519; 44.64%	Ross Landry; 3,650; 46.30%	Neil MacIsaac; 567; 7.19%	Jim Lindsey; 147; 1.86%		Pat Dunn
Pictou East	J. Ed MacDonald; 1,984; 25.94%	Clarrie MacKinnon; 4,893; 63.98%	Francois Rochon; 642; 8.39%	Robbie Loftus White; 129; 1.69%		Clarrie MacKinnon
Pictou West	Leonard Fraser; 1,466; 19.99%	Charlie Parker; 4,226; 57.63%	Paul Landry; 1,471; 20.06%	Chelsea Richardson; 170; 2.32%		Charlie Parker

=== Cape Breton ===
Electoral district	Candidates					Incumbent
Electoral district	PC	NDP	Liberal	Green	Independent	Incumbent
Cape Breton Centre	Chris Ryan; 479; 7.53%	Frank Corbett; 5,096; 80.14%	Joe MacPherson; 685; 10.77%	Chris Alders; 99; 1.56%		Frank Corbett
Cape Breton North	Cecil Clarke; 3,477; 44.47%	Russell MacDonald; 3,312; 42.36%	Ken Jardine; 921; 11.78%	Chris Milburn; 108; 1.38%		Cecil Clarke
Cape Breton Nova	Cory Hann; 276; 4.14%	Gordie Gosse; 4,735; 71.07%	Donnie Morrison; 1,549; 23.25%	Michael P. Milburn; 102; 1.53%		Gordie Gosse
Cape Breton South	Steve Tobin; 1,387; 15.12%	Wayne McKay; 3,332; 36.33%	Manning MacDonald; 4,278; 46.65%	Cathy Theriault; 174; 1.90%		Manning MacDonald
Cape Breton West	Alfie MacLeod; 3,962; 43.47%	Delton MacDonald; 2,797; 30.69%	Josephine Kennedy; 2,212; 24.27%	Michael Parsons; 143; 1.57%		Alfie MacLeod
Glace Bay	Tom MacPherson; 810; 11.41%	Myrtle Campbell; 2,829; 39.84%	Dave Wilson; 3,380; 47.60%	Todd Pettigrew; 82; 1.15%		Dave Wilson
Inverness	**Rodney MacDonald**; 8,714; 98.54%	Michael MacIsaac; 1,971; 20.49%	Shaun Bennett; 1,905; 19.81%	Nathalie Arsenault; 339; 3.53%		Rodney MacDonald
Richmond	John Greene; 1,045; 17.92%	Clair Rankin; 1,477; 25.33%	Michel Samson; 3,228; 55.36%	John Percy; 81; 1.39%		Michel Samson
Victoria-The Lakes	Keith Bain; 2,417; 38.68%	Fraser Patterson; 1,680; 26.88%	Gerald Sampson; 1,912; 30.60%	James V. O'Brien; 143; 2.29%	Stemer MacLeod; 97; 1.55%	Keith Bain

== Opinion polls ==
Date	Source	PC	NDP	Liberal	Green
4 Jun 2009	Angus Reid Strategies	23	47	26	3
1 Jun 2009	Corporate Research Associates	26	44	28	2
7–16 May 2009	Corporate Research Associates	28	37	31	3
Feb 2009	Corporate Research Associates	30	36	31	3
Nov 2008	Corporate Research Associates	33	37	27	3
Aug 2008	Corporate Research Associates	33	36	28	3
May 2008	Corporate Research Associates	27	38	30	4
Feb 2008	Corporate Research Associates	32	37	28	3
Nov 2007	Corporate Research Associates	32	39	25	3
Aug 2007	Corporate Research Associates	32	35	28	5
May 2007	Corporate Research Associates	29	37	26	7
Feb 2007	Corporate Research Associates	35	36	25	3
Nov 2006	Corporate Research Associates	32	37	26	4
Aug 2006	Corporate Research Associates	33	35	24	8
13 Jun 2006	Election	39.6	34.6	23.4	2.3

== Bibliography ==
- Government of Nova Scotia. "Summary Results from 1867 to 2011" (PDF). Elections Statistics. Elections Nova Scotia. Archived from the original (PDF) on October 3, 2013.
