= 1996 Nova Scotia New Democratic Party leadership election =

- March 30, 1996
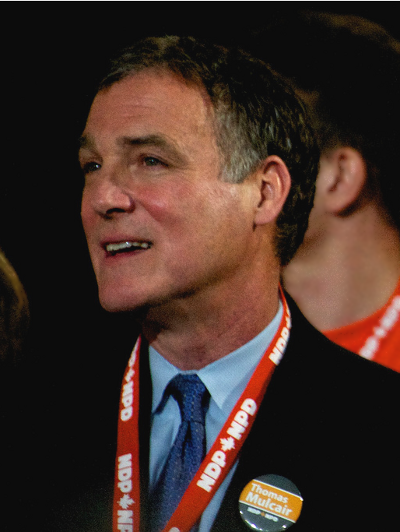
Candidate	Robert Chisholm	Yvonne Atwell
Final ballot	201 (83.75%)	39 (16.25%)
Leader before election
John Holm (interim)
Alexa McDonough
Elected Leader
Robert Chisholm

1996 Nova Scotia New Democratic Party leadership election
- Date: March 30, 1996
- Resigning leader: John Holm (interim); Alexa McDonough
- Won by: Robert Chisholm
- Ballots: 1
- Candidates: 2

The 1996 Nova Scotia New Democratic Party leadership election was held on March 30, 1996, to elect a successor to Alexa McDonough as leader of the Nova Scotia New Democratic Party. The election was necessary because McDonough had announced her resignation as party leader on November 19, 1994. Robert Chisholm was elected, defeating Yvonne Atwell.

== Background ==
Alexa McDonough's resignation as leader of the Nova Scotia NDP November 19, 1994 was considered a surprised, although she had served as party leader for the previous fourteen years. She had previously been rumored as a potential candidate for leadership of the federal New Democratic Party in 1989; but this did not come to pass. At the time of her resignation in 1994, she stated that she would not be seeking the leadership of the federal NDP at its 1995 leadership election; although she later entered and won that election. McDonough's resignation resulted in John Holm serving as interim leader of the Nova Scotia NDP from November 1994 to March 1996.

== Candidates ==
=== Yvonne Atwell ===
Yvonne Atwell was a community activist from East Preston. Atwell would later become the first Black Nova Scotian woman to be elected to the Nova Scotia House of Assembly in 1998. Before entering politics, she was the director of the African-Canadian Employment Clinic in Halifax.

=== Robert Chisholm ===
Robert Chisholm was the MLA for Halifax Atlantic. He was first elected in a 1991 provincial by-election. Before entering politics, he was a labour union official.

== Ballot results ==
First Ballot
Candidate	Votes	Percentage
Robert Chisholm	201	83.75
Yvonne Atwell	39	16.25
Total	240	100.00
