= Tom McInnis (Canadian politician) =

Canadian politician (born 1945)

The Honourable Thomas Johnson McInnis ECNS

Canadian Senator from Nova Scotia
- In office September 6, 2012 – April 9, 2020
- Nominated by: Stephen Harper
- Appointed by: David Johnston

Member of the Nova Scotia House of Assembly for Halifax Eastern Shore
- In office 1978–1993
- Preceded by: Alexander Garnet Brown
- Succeeded by: Riding dissolved

Personal details
- Born: April 9, 1945 (age 81) Sheet Harbour, Nova Scotia, Canada
- Party: Conservative

Thomas Johnson McInnis (born April 9, 1945) is a retired Canadian senator. He also represented the electoral district of Halifax Eastern Shore in the Nova Scotia House of Assembly from 1978 to 1993, as a member of the Progressive Conservative Party of Nova Scotia.

Born on April 9, 1945, in Sheet Harbour, Nova Scotia, McInnis attended Saint Mary's University and earned his law degree from Dalhousie University. He specializes in property and commercial law and public-private partnerships. He is the president of the Sheet Harbour and Area Chamber of Commerce and was appointed to the Halifax Port Authority in 2008.

== Political career ==
McInnis entered provincial politics in the 1978 election, defeating Liberal cabinet minister Alexander Garnet Brown in the Halifax Eastern Shore riding. On October 5, 1978, McInnis was appointed to the Executive Council of Nova Scotia as Minister of Transportation. McInnis was re-elected in the 1981 election, and was named Minister of Municipal Affairs in a post-election cabinet shuffle. McInnis was re-elected in the 1984 election, and became Minister of Education in November 1985. He was moved to Minister of Community Services in November 1987. Following his re-election in the 1988 election, McInnis was named Attorney General.

In September 1990, John Buchanan resigned as premier, and a leadership convention was scheduled for February 1991. On November 7, 1990, McInnis announced his candidacy for the leadership of the Progressive Conservative Party of Nova Scotia. At the leadership convention, McInnis was eliminated following the second ballot, finishing third behind Donald Cameron and Roland Thornhill. On February 26, 1991, Cameron was sworn-in as premier and named McInnis as Minister of Industry and Deputy Premier of Nova Scotia. He was moved to Minister of Labour in November 1992. In the 1993 election, McInnis ran in the new riding of Eastern Shore, and lost to Liberal Keith Colwell by 237 votes.

In the 2000 federal election, McInnis was the Progressive Conservative candidate in Dartmouth, but finished third behind NDP incumbent Wendy Lill and Liberal Bernie Boudreau. In September 2012, McInnis was appointed to the Senate of Canada.

2000 Canadian federal election: Dartmouth—Cole Harbour
Party	Candidate	Votes	%	±%
New Democratic	Wendy Lill	13,585	36.28	+3.71
Liberal	Bernie Boudreau	12,408	33.14	+5.93
Progressive Conservative	Tom McInnis	8,085	21.59	-5.32
Alliance	Jordi Morgan	3,282	8.76	-2.99
Marxist–Leninist	Charles Spurr	86	0.23	
Total valid votes		37,446	100.00	
Change for the Canadian Alliance from 1997 are based on the results of its predecessor, the Reform Party.
