= Gary Hines =

Gary Hines may refer to:

- Gary Hines (politician), Canadian politician in the Nova Scotia House of Assembly
- Gary Hines (handballer) (born 1984), American handball player
