= Twila Grosse =

Canadian politician

The Honourable Twila Grosse ECNS MLA

Member of the Nova Scotia House of Assembly for Preston
- Incumbent
- Assumed office August 8, 2023
- Preceded by: Angela Simmonds

Personal details
- Born: Twila Rose Grosse; 1961/1962
- Party: Progressive Conservative Association of Nova Scotia

Twila Rose Grosse (born 1961 or 1962) is a Canadian politician who was elected to the Nova Scotia House of Assembly in the 2023 Preston provincial by-election. She is the first Black Canadian member of the Progressive Conservative Association of Nova Scotia caucus.

== Early life and education ==
Grosse grew up in Cherry Brook, Nova Scotia and graduated from Mount Saint Vincent University in 1983.

== Career ==
Grosse worked at the Halifax Stanfield International Airport for 36 years until her retirement in 2020, having worked as Budget Analyst, Business Planning Manager and Accountant.

She was re-elected in the 2024 Nova Scotia general election.

== Electoral record ==
2024 Nova Scotia general election: Preston
Party	Candidate	Votes	%	±%
Progressive Conservative	Twila Grosse	2,139	51.41	+6.18
New Democratic	Colter (C.C.) Simmonds	1,214	29.18	+2.62
Liberal	Carlo Simmons	739	17.76	-5.92
Green	Andre Anderson	69	1.66	-0.68
Total		4,161	–	
Total rejected ballots		43		
Turnout		4,205	37.88	
Eligible voters		11,100		
Progressive Conservative hold		Swing		
Source: Elections Nova Scotia

Nova Scotia provincial by-election, August 8, 2023 Resignation of Angela Simmonds
Party	Candidate	Votes	%	±%	Expenditures
Progressive Conservative	Twila Grosse	1,950	45.22	+16.53	$49,241.83
New Democratic	Colter Simmonds	1,145	26.55	-1.37	$70,390.30
Liberal	Carlo Simmons	1,021	23.68	-19.71	$46,215.10
Green	Anthony Edmonds	101	2.34	–	$930.16
Nova Scotians United	Bobby Taylor	95	2.20	–	$5,782.79
Total valid votes/Expense limit		4,312	99.29	–	$76,489.21
Total rejected ballots		31	0.71	-0.08	
Turnout		4,343	38.79	-7.56	
Eligible voters		11,195			
Progressive Conservative gain from Liberal		Swing		+18.12	
Source: Elections Nova Scotia
