= Percy Paris =

Canadian politician

The Honourable Percy Paris ECNS
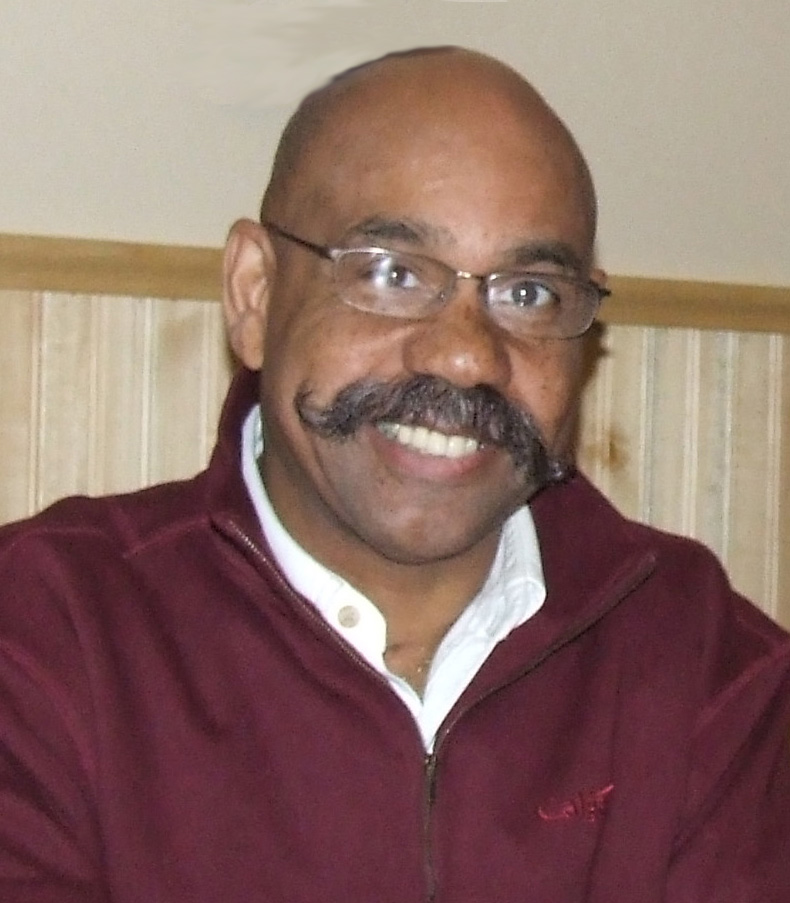
- Paris in 2007

Member of the Nova Scotia House of Assembly for Waverley-Fall River-Beaver Bank
- In office June 13, 2006 – October 8, 2013
- Preceded by: Gary Hines
- Succeeded by: Bill Horne

Minister of Economic and Rural Development
- In office June 19, 2009 – May 9, 2013
- Preceded by: Angus MacIsaac
- Succeeded by: Graham Steele

Minister of Tourism, Culture, and Heritage
- In office June 19, 2009 – May 9, 2013
- Preceded by: Bill Dooks
- Succeeded by: Graham Steele

Minister of African Nova Scotian Affairs
- In office June 19, 2009 – May 9, 2013
- Preceded by: Barry Barnet
- Succeeded by: Maureen MacDonald

Personal details
- Born: Percy Alonzo Paris; 1947 or 1948 (age 77–78) Windsor, Nova Scotia, Canada
- Party: NDP
- Occupation: Business owner, university administrator

Percy Alonzo Paris is a former Canadian politician from Nova Scotia. He represented the constituency of Waverley-Fall River-Beaver Bank in the Nova Scotia House of Assembly for the Nova Scotia New Democratic Party from 2006 to 2013.

A native of Windsor, Paris has worked in a variety of jobs. He was a small business owner, having owned and operated a bar in Lower Sackville, as well as the Jet Journal, a local publication. Paris also worked as a municipal employee for the City of Halifax and as a hockey scout with the International Hockey League and the Quebec Major Junior Hockey League. Paris worked for Dalhousie University as director of the Diversity Initiative, Black Student Advisor and an instructor in Black History. He was involved with the Transition Year Program.

Paris has been an active community volunteer and received a human rights award from the Human Rights Commission of Nova Scotia for his work bringing communities together through sport. Paris has held positions on a number of boards of directors including the Riverlake Residents' Association, the Black Business Initiative, National Access Awareness Week, Network for Entrepreneurs with Disabilities, the King's-Edgehill School Alumni Association, Team Work Co-operative, Halifax Black Community Workshop, Dartmouth East Black Learning Centre and the Metro Committee for Persons with Disabilities.

== Political career ==
In 2006, Paris successfully ran for the Nova Scotia New Democratic Party nomination in the riding of Waverley-Fall River-Beaver Bank. He was elected in the 2006 provincial election, defeating the incumbent Progressive Conservative Gary Hines with 46.39 per cent of the vote. Paris was re-elected in the 2009 provincial election with 54.47 per cent of the vote. During this period Paris was the only African-Nova Scotian elected to the provincial legislature.

While serving as a member of the official opposition from 2006 to 2009, Paris was the NDP's critic for Education and Early Childhood Development, as well as African Nova Scotian Affairs.

On June 19, 2009, Paris was appointed to the Executive Council of Nova Scotia where he served as Minister of Economic and Rural Development, as well as Minister of Tourism, Culture and Heritage, and as Minister of African Nova Scotian Affairs.

On May 9, 2013, Paris resigned from cabinet following an incident at the House of Assembly earlier in the day. Paris revealed that he "lost his composure" in the hallway outside the legislature chamber involving a fellow member of the Nova Scotia House of Assembly. Later that same day, a spokesman for Halifax Regional Police confirmed they were investigating an alleged assault at the legislature building, issuing a statement saying that they had charged a 65-year-old man from Windsor Junction with uttering threats and assault after receiving a complaint.

On May 10, 2013, Liberal member of the Nova Scotia legislature Keith Colwell stated "Yesterday in the House of Assembly, I was assaulted and threatened by the Minister of Economic and Rural Development and Tourism", adding that he did not know what prompted the attack. According to Paris, the pair had a "heated exchange" near the doorway of a washroom for members of the legislative assembly, admitting that he momentarily lost his temper and stating "I regret I lost my cool for a few seconds". Colwell has been a member of the legislature since 1993. Paris's lawyer appeared in court on June 18, 2013, on his behalf where the case was adjourned to July 4, 2013. Paris's lawyer appeared in court July 4, 2013, on his behalf and stated that he was accepting responsibility for a minor assault and making threats against Colwell, and by doing so, could end up with no criminal record. The Crown prosecutor recommended that Paris enter the adult diversion program. Paris completed the adult diversion program and it was announced on October 24, 2013, that the charges were being dropped.

Paris was not re-elected in the 2013 provincial election, placing third behind candidates for the Progressive Conservative Party and the winning Liberal Party.
