= Alexander Garnet Brown =

Canadian businessman and politician

The Honourable Alexander Garnet Brown ECNS
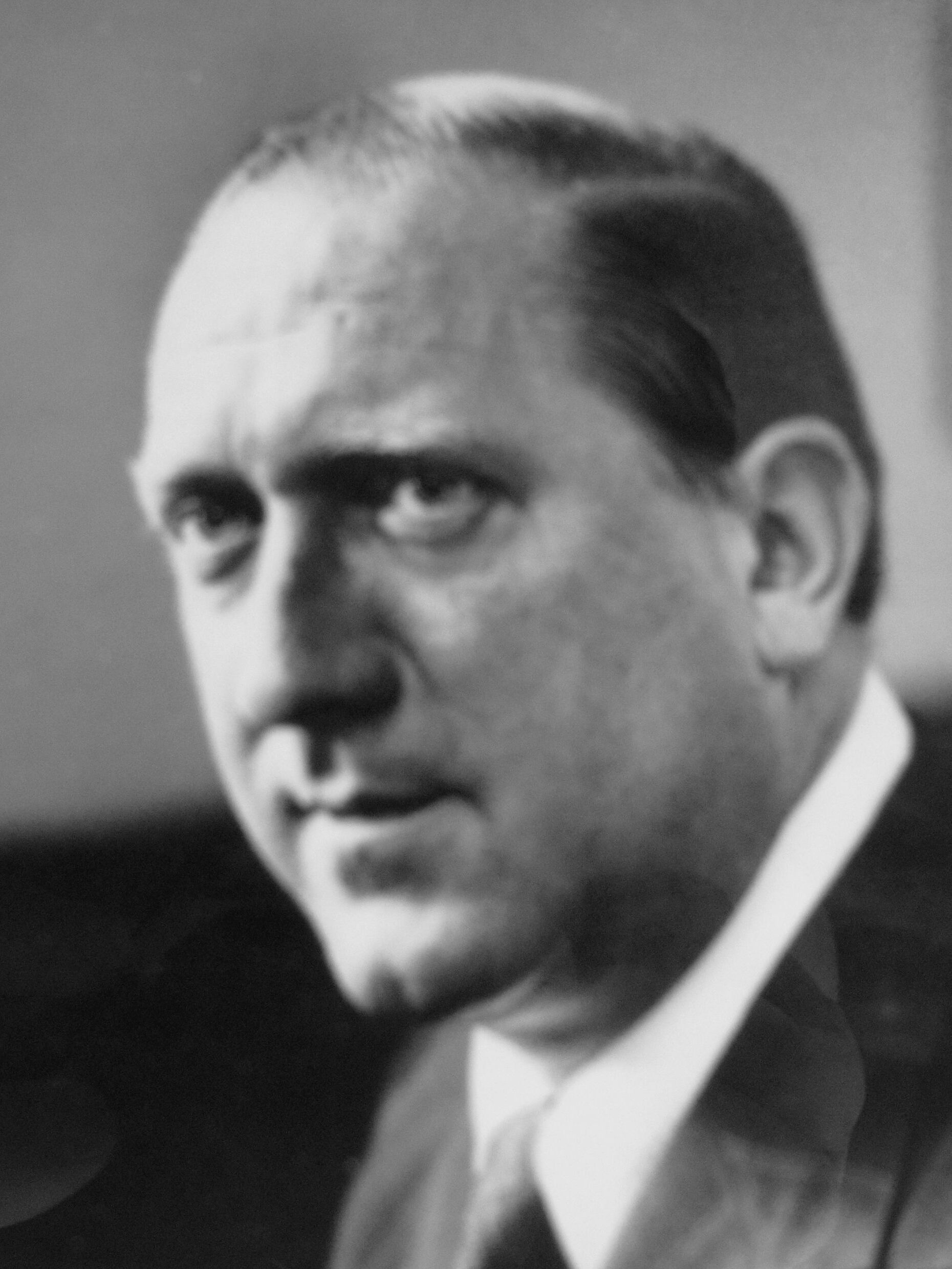
- Brown, c. 1973

MLA for Halifax Eastern Shore
- In office July 8, 1969 (byelection) – 1978
- Preceded by: Duncan MacMillan
- Succeeded by: Tom McInnis

Personal details
- Born: May 22, 1930
- Died: January 7, 2010 (aged 79) Halifax, Nova Scotia
- Party: Liberal
- Occupation: businessman

Alexander Garnet Brown (May 2, 1930 – January 7, 2010) was a Canadian businessman and politician who served in the Nova Scotia House of Assembly from 1969 to 1978. He represented the electoral district of Halifax Eastern Shore as a Liberal.

Brown was an athlete in his youth, and was signed by the Brooklyn Dodgers, playing in their farm system for two years.

In the 1950s, Brown and his father founded Atlantic Canada's largest food brokerage, A.G. Brown and Sons Ltd. He was also co-founder of Halifax Cablevision, and a founder and director of Dartmouth Cable Television.

First elected in a by-election on July 8, 1969, Brown was re-elected in 1970 and 1974. He served until he was defeated in the 1978 general election.

Brown served in the Executive Council of Nova Scotia for Premier Gerald Regan. His cabinet duties included Highways (1970–1972), Public Works (1970–1971), Recreation (1973–1978), and the Residential Tenancies Act (1972–1975).

In 2001, Brown was awarded a Doctorate of Commerce (honoris causa) by Saint Mary's University.

Brown died on January 7, 2010.
