= Joyce Treen =

Canadian politician

Member of the Nova Scotia House of Assembly for Cole Harbour-Eastern Passage
- In office October 8, 2013 – May 30, 2017
- Preceded by: Becky Kent
- Succeeded by: Barbara Adams

Personal details
- Party: Liberal

Colleen Joyce Treen is a Canadian politician who was elected to the Nova Scotia House of Assembly in the 2013 provincial election. A member of the Nova Scotia Liberal Party, she represented the electoral district of Cole Harbour-Eastern Passage until her defeat in the 2017 election.

== Electoral record ==
2017 Nova Scotia general election
Party	Candidate	Votes	%	±%
Progressive Conservative	Barbara Adams	2,682	36.40	+15.74
Liberal	Joyce Treen	2,585	35.08	-5.54
New Democratic	Nancy Jakeman	1,759	23.87	-14.85
Green	Rebecca Mosher	343	4.65	+4.65
Total valid votes		7,369	100.0	

2013 Nova Scotia general election
Party	Candidate	Votes	%	±%
Liberal	Joyce Treen	3,057	40.62	
New Democratic Party	Becky Kent	2,914	38.72	
Progressive Conservative	Lloyd Jackson	1,555	20.66	
