= Sid Prest =

Canadian politician (1943–2015)

MLA for Eastern Shore
- In office June 9, 2009 – October 8, 2013
- Preceded by: Bill Dooks
- Succeeded by: Kevin Murphy

Personal details
- Party: New Democrat

Sidney Wilson Prest (1943–2015) was a Canadian politician, who was elected to the Nova Scotia House of Assembly in the 2009 provincial election. He was a lifelong resident of Mooseland, Nova Scotia, and represented the electoral district of Eastern Shore as a member of the New Democratic Party. Prest was defeated when he ran for re-election in the 2013 election. Prest died on December 14, 2015.

== Electoral record ==
2013 Nova Scotia general election
Party	Candidate	Votes	%	±%
Liberal	Kevin Murphy	3,770	52.99	
New Democratic Party	Sid Prest	1,922	27.01	
Progressive Conservative	Steve Brine	1,423	20.00	

2009 provincial election Eastern Shore
Party	Candidate	Votes	%	±%
New Democratic Party	Sidney Prest	3,627	49.54	
Progressive Conservative	Bill Dooks	2,517	34.38	
Liberal Party	Loretta Day Halleran	968	13.47	
Green	Michael Marshall	192	2.62	–
