= Dennis Richards =

Canadian politician

MLA for Cole Harbour-Eastern Passage
- In office 1993–1998
- Preceded by: new riding
- Succeeded by: Kevin Deveaux

Personal details
- Party: Liberal

Dennis Richards is a Canadian politician. He represented the electoral district of Cole Harbour-Eastern Passage in the Nova Scotia House of Assembly from 1993 to 1998. He was a member of the Nova Scotia Liberal Party.

Richards was elected a municipal councillor for Halifax County, Nova Scotia in 1988. He entered provincial politics in the 1993 election, winning the Cole Harbour-Eastern Passage riding. A backbench member of the John Savage government, Richards served as chair of the government caucus. Richards did not reoffer in the 1998 election.
