= Brian Wong (politician) =

Canadian politician

The Honourable Brian Wong ECNS MLA

Member of the Nova Scotia House of Assembly for Waverley-Fall River-Beaver Bank
- Incumbent
- Assumed office August 17, 2021
- Preceded by: Bill Horne

Personal details
- Born: Brian Joseph Wong; February 23, 1963 (age 63) Digby, Nova Scotia
- Party: Progressive Conservative

Brian Joseph Wong (born February 23, 1963) is a Canadian politician who was elected to the Nova Scotia House of Assembly in the 2021 Nova Scotia general election. He represents the riding of Waverley-Fall River-Beaver Bank as a member of the Progressive Conservative Association of Nova Scotia. He was the first Nova Scotian of Chinese descent elected to the Nova Scotia House of Assembly.

He previously ran in the same district in the 2013 Nova Scotia general election, losing to Bill Horne.

On August 31, 2021, Wong was made Minister of Advanced Education.

== Electoral record ==
=== 2024 ===
2024 Nova Scotia general election: Waverley-Fall River-Beaver Bank
Party	Candidate	Votes	%	±%
Progressive Conservative	Brian Wong	4,653	56.70	+16.32
Liberal	Elizabeth Booth	1,635	19.92	-16.44
New Democratic	Donna McCarthy	1,575	19.19	+2.98
Green	Anthony Edmonds	344	4.19	-2.13
Total valid votes		8,207		
Total rejected ballots		36		
Turnout		8,244	45.20	
Eligible voters		18,237		
Progressive Conservative hold		Swing		
Source: Elections Nova Scotia

=== 2021 ===
2021 Nova Scotia general election: Waverley-Fall River-Beaver Bank
Party	Candidate	Votes	%	±%	Expenditures
Progressive Conservative	Brian Wong	3,938	40.38	+3.02	$33,476.85
Liberal	Marni Tuttle	3,546	36.36	-0.74	$36,707.22
New Democratic	Christina McCarron	1,581	16.21	-2.86	$35,608.26
Green	Anthony Edmonds	617	6.33	-0.06	$5,170.04
Atlantica	Shawn Whitford	71	0.73	+0.63	$200.00
Total valid votes/expense limit		9,753	99.86	–	$98,713.68
Total rejected ballots		14	0.14		
Turnout		9,767	56.55		
Eligible voters		17,272			
Progressive Conservative notional hold		Swing		+1.88	
Source: Elections Nova Scotia
