= Wayne Adams =

Canadian politician (born 1943)

The Honourable Wayne Adams CM ECNS ONS

Member of the Nova Scotia House of Assembly for Preston
- In office 1993–1998
- Preceded by: The riding was created in 1993.
- Succeeded by: Yvonne Atwell

Personal details
- Born: 1943 (age 82–83) Halifax, Nova Scotia, Canada
- Party: Liberal

Wayne Adams CM ONS (born 1943) is a Canadian politician who was the first Black Canadian member of the Nova Scotia House of Assembly and cabinet minister.

== Early life ==
Wayne Adams was born in Halifax, Nova Scotia, in 1943.

== Political career ==
Adams was first elected to the Halifax Municipal Council in 1979 and was re-elected five times. He was deputy mayor from 1982 to 1983.

A Nova Scotia Liberal, he was elected in the 1993 Nova Scotia general election in the riding of Preston. He was the Minister of the Environment, Minister responsible for the Emergency Measures Act, and the Minister responsible for the Nova Scotia Boxing Authority in the governments of first John Savage (1993–1997) and then Russell MacLellan (1997–1998). He was defeated in 1998 by the NDP candidate, Yvonne Atwell.

== Electoral record ==
1998 Nova Scotia General Election
Party	Vote	%
Yvonne Atwell	1,777	42.99
Wayne Adams	1,548	37.45
Ross D. Isenor	809	19.57

1993 Nova Scotia General Election
Party	Vote	%
Wayne Adams	1,872	38.57
David Hendsbee	1,381	24.46
Darryl Gray	1,016	25.66
Yvonne Atwell	584	12.03

== Awards and recognition ==
In 2003, he was made a Member of the Order of Canada, Canada's highest civilian honour.

In 2011, he was invested as a member of the Order of Nova Scotia.
