= Halifax East =

Former provincial electoral district in Nova Scotia, Canada

Nova Scotia electoral district

Defunct provincial electoral district
- Legislature: Nova Scotia House of Assembly
- District created: 1933
- District abolished: 1967
- Last contested: 1963

Halifax East was a provincial electoral district in Nova Scotia, Canada, that elected one member to the Nova Scotia House of Assembly. It was formed in 1933 when Halifax County was divided into five distinct electoral districts. In 1966, it was renamed Halifax County East, and in 1967, its boundaries were reformed to create the current district of Halifax Eastern Shore.

== Members of the Legislative Assembly ==
Halifax East elected the following members to the Legislative Assembly:

Halifax East
Legislature	Years	Member	Party
District created from Halifax County (1867–1933)
40th	1933–1937	Geoffrey W. Stevens	Liberal
41st	1937–1941	Geoffrey W. Stevens	Liberal
42nd	1941–1945	Geoffrey W. Stevens	Liberal
43rd	1945–1949	Geoffrey W. Stevens	Liberal
44th	1949–1953	Geoffrey W. Stevens	Liberal
45th	1953–1956	Geoffrey W. Stevens	Liberal
46th	1956–1960	Duncan MacMillan	Liberal
47th	1960–1963	Duncan MacMillan	Liberal
48th	1963–1967	Nelson Gaetz	Progressive Conservative
District dissolved into Halifax Eastern Shore (1967–1993)

== Election results ==
=== 1963 ===
1963 Nova Scotia general election
Party	Candidate	Votes	%	±%
Progressive Conservative	Nelson Gaetz	3,061	52.62%	8.56%
Liberal	Duncan MacMillan	2,756	47.38%	-3.11%
Total		5,817	–	
Source(s) Source: Nova Scotia Legislature (2024). "Electoral History for Halifax East" (PDF). nslegislature.ca. Nova Scotia Legislature (1963). Returns of the General Election for the House of Assembly (PDF) (Report). Queen's Printer. Archived from the original (PDF) on 25 July 2018.

=== 1960 ===
1960 Nova Scotia general election
Party	Candidate	Votes	%	±%
Liberal	Duncan MacMillan	2,787	50.49%	-7.35%
Progressive Conservative	Nelson Gaetz	2,432	44.06%	1.89%
Co-operative Commonwealth	Wallace Mason	301	5.45%	–
Total		5,520	–	
Source(s) Source: Nova Scotia Legislature (2024). "Electoral History for Halifax East" (PDF). nslegislature.ca. Nova Scotia Legislature (1960). Returns of the General Election for the House of Assembly (PDF) (Report). Queen's Printer. Archived from the original (PDF) on 25 July 2018.

=== 1956 ===
1956 Nova Scotia general election
Party	Candidate	Votes	%	±%
Liberal	Duncan MacMillan	3,015	57.84%	7.00%
Progressive Conservative	Reid Denton Sangster	2,198	42.16%	-1.20%
Total		5,213	–	
Source(s) Source: Nova Scotia Legislature (2024). "Electoral History for Halifax East" (PDF). nslegislature.ca. Nova Scotia Legislature (1956). Returns of the General Election for the House of Assembly (PDF) (Report). Queen's Printer. Archived from the original (PDF) on 10 September 2018.

=== 1953 ===
1953 Nova Scotia general election
Party	Candidate	Votes	%	±%
Liberal	Geoffrey W. Stevens	8,436	50.83%	-1.39%
Progressive Conservative	Lt. Col. R. D. King	7,196	43.36%	14.38%
Co-operative Commonwealth	Harper Power	964	5.81%	-12.99%
Total		16,596	–	
Source(s) Source: Nova Scotia Legislature (2024). "Electoral History for Halifax East" (PDF). nslegislature.ca. Nova Scotia Legislature (1953). Returns of the General Election for the House of Assembly (PDF) (Report). Queen's Printer. Archived from the original (PDF) on 10 September 2018.

=== 1949 ===
1949 Nova Scotia general election
Party	Candidate	Votes	%	±%
Liberal	Geoffrey W. Stevens	7,703	52.22%	-1.25%
Progressive Conservative	R. Graham Murray	4,274	28.98%	2.84%
Co-operative Commonwealth	Wallace Mason	2,773	18.80%	-1.59%
Total		14,750	–	
Source(s) Source: Nova Scotia Legislature (2024). "Electoral History for Halifax East" (PDF). nslegislature.ca. Nova Scotia Legislature (1949). Returns of the General Election for the House of Assembly (PDF) (Report). Queen's Printer. Archived from the original (PDF) on 10 September 2018.

=== 1945 ===
1945 Nova Scotia general election
Party	Candidate	Votes	%	±%
Liberal	Geoffrey W. Stevens	6,206	53.48%	-6.91%
Progressive Conservative	A. L. Mattatall	3,033	26.14%	-13.47%
Co-operative Commonwealth	Cecil Clyde Russell	2,366	20.39%	–
Total		11,605	–	
Source(s) Source: Nova Scotia Legislature (2024). "Electoral History for Halifax East" (PDF). nslegislature.ca. Nova Scotia Legislature (1945). Returns of the General Election for the House of Assembly (PDF) (Report). Queen's Printer. Archived from the original (PDF) on 10 September 2018.

=== 1941 ===
1941 Nova Scotia general election
Party	Candidate	Votes	%	±%
Liberal	Geoffrey W. Stevens	5,094	60.39%	8.12%
Progressive Conservative	Norman Dudley Murray	3,341	39.61%	-8.12%
Total		8,435	–	
Source(s) Source: Nova Scotia Legislature (2024). "Electoral History for Halifax East" (PDF). nslegislature.ca. Nova Scotia Legislature (1941). Returns of the General Election for the House of Assembly (PDF) (Report). Queen's Printer. Archived from the original (PDF) on 8 February 2024.

=== 1937 ===
1937 Nova Scotia general election
Party	Candidate	Votes	%	±%
Liberal	Geoffrey W. Stevens	6,082	52.27%	-0.59%
Progressive Conservative	Josiah Frederick Fraser	5,554	47.73%	0.59%
Total		11,636	–	
Source(s) Source: Nova Scotia Legislature (2024). "Electoral History for Halifax East" (PDF). nslegislature.ca. Nova Scotia Legislature (1937). Returns of the General Election for the House of Assembly (PDF) (Report). Queen's Printer. Archived from the original (PDF) on 1 March 2019.

=== 1933 ===
1933 Nova Scotia general election
Party	Candidate	Votes	%	±%
Liberal	Geoffrey W. Stevens	6,273	52.86%	–
Liberal-Conservative	Josiah Frederick Fraser	5,595	47.14%	–
Total		11,868	–	
Source(s) Source: Nova Scotia Legislature (2024). "Electoral History for Halifax East" (PDF). nslegislature.ca. Nova Scotia Legislature (1933). Returns of the General Election for the House of Assembly (PDF) (Report). Queen's Printer. Archived from the original (PDF) on 1 March 2019.

== See also ==
- List of Nova Scotia provincial electoral districts
- Canadian provincial electoral districts
