= Cole Harbour-Eastern Passage =

Former provincial electoral district in Nova Scotia, Canada

Nova Scotia electoral district

Defunct provincial electoral district
- Legislature: Nova Scotia House of Assembly
- District created: 1993
- District abolished: 2021
- Last contested: 2017

Demographics
- Population (2016): 35,355
- Electors: 13,158
- Area (km²): 50.00
- Census division: Halifax Regional Municipality

Cole Harbour—Eastern Passage was a provincial electoral district in Nova Scotia, Canada, that elected one member of the Nova Scotia House of Assembly.

The district was created in 1992 from Cole Harbour.

In 2003, the district lost an area south of the Circumferential Highway and the eastern side of Morris Lake to Dartmouth South, and lost an area south of Portland Street to Cole Harbour.

In 2013, the district gained the area south of Russell Lake and east of Highway 111 from Dartmouth South-Portland Valley.

The district was abolished at the 2021 Nova Scotia general election, mostly into Eastern Passage and parts of Cole Harbour-Dartmouth and Cole Harbour.

== Members of the Legislative Assembly ==
This riding has elected the following members of the Legislative Assembly:

Legislature	Years	Member	Party
63rd	2017–2021	Barbara Adams	Progressive Conservative
62nd	2013–2017	Joyce Treen	Liberal
61st	2009–2013	Becky Kent	New Democratic
60th	2007–2009	Becky Kent	New Democratic
60th	2006–2007	Kevin Deveaux	New Democratic
59th	2003–2006	Kevin Deveaux	New Democratic
58th	1999–2003	Kevin Deveaux	New Democratic
57th	1998–1999	Kevin Deveaux	New Democratic
56th	1993–1998	Dennis Richards	Liberal

== Election results ==
2017 Nova Scotia general election
Party	Candidate	Votes	%	±%
Progressive Conservative	Barbara Adams	2,682	36.40	+15.74
Liberal	Joyce Treen	2,585	35.08	-5.54
New Democratic	Nancy Jakeman	1,759	23.87	-14.85
Green	Rebecca Mosher	343	4.65	+4.65
Total valid votes		7,369	100.0	
Total rejected ballots		30	0.40	
Turnout		7,399	49.65	
Eligible voters		14,903		
Progressive Conservative gain from Liberal		Swing		+10.64
Source: Elections Nova Scotia

2013 Nova Scotia general election
Party	Candidate	Votes	%	±%
Liberal	Joyce Treen	3,057	40.62	+25.02
New Democratic Party	Becky Kent	2,914	38.72	-26.45
Progressive Conservative	Lloyd Jackson	1,555	20.66	+4.76

2009 Nova Scotia general election
Party	Candidate	Votes	%	±%
New Democratic Party	Becky Kent	4,402	65.17	+20.78
Progressive Conservative	Lloyd Jackson	1,074	15.90	-17.73
Liberal	Orest Ulan	1,054	15.60	-1.70
Green	Denise Menard	225	3.33	-1.35

2007 Cole Harbour-Eastern Passage provincial by-election
Party	Candidate	Votes	%	±%
New Democratic Party	Becky Kent	2,459	44.39	-20.01
Progressive Conservative	Michael Eddy	1,863	33.63	+14.71
Liberal	Kelly Rambeau	958	17.30	+2.07
Green	Beverley Woodfield	259	4.68	+2.24

2006 Nova Scotia general election
Party	Candidate	Votes	%
New Democratic	Kevin Deveaux	4086	64.4
Progressive Conservative	Don McIver	1201	18.93
Liberal	Brian Churchill	903	14.23
Green	Beverley Woodfield	155	2.44

2003 Nova Scotia general election
Party	Candidate	Votes	%	±%
New Democratic Party	Kevin Deveaux	3,997	58.44	+19.17
Progressive Conservative	Harry McInroy	1,641	23.99	-13.36
Liberal	Brian Churchill	1,121	16.39	-6.99
Nova Scotia Party	Kailee A. McPherson	80	1.17	

1999 Nova Scotia general election
Party	Candidate	Votes	%	±%
New Democratic Party	Kevin Deveaux	3,721	39.27	-
Progressive Conservative	Nadune Cooper Mont	3,539	37.35	-
Liberal	Colin MacEachern	2,216	23.38	-

1998 Nova Scotia general election
Party	Candidate	Votes	%	±%
New Democratic Party	Kevin Deveaux	4,411	45.73	-
Progressive Conservative	Randy Anstey	3,303	34.24	-
Liberal	Linda DeGrace	1,931	20.02	-

1993 Nova Scotia general election
Party	Candidate	Votes	%	±%
Liberal	Dennis Richards	4,702	48.13	-
Progressive Conservative	John Gold	3,409	34.89	-
New Democratic Party	Ash Shaihk	1,501	15.36	-
Natural Law Party	Helen Creighton	158	1.62	-

== See also ==
- List of Nova Scotia provincial electoral districts
- Canadian provincial electoral districts
