= 2023 Preston provincial by-election =

Provincial by-election in Nova Scotia, Canada

- August 8, 2023

Riding of Preston
- Turnout: 38.79%
	First party	Second party	Third party
	PC	NDP	LIB
Candidate	Twila Grosse	Colter Simmonds	Carlo Simmons
Party	Progressive Conservative	New Democratic	Liberal
Popular vote	1,950	1,145	1,021
Percentage	45.2%	26.6%	23.7%
Swing	▲16.5 pp	▼1.4 pp	▼19.7 pp
MLA before election
Angela Simmonds
Liberal
Elected MLA
Twila Grosse
Progressive Conservative

A by-election was held in the provincial riding of Preston in Nova Scotia on August 8, 2023, to elect a new member of the House of Assembly following the resignation of Liberal MLA Angela Simmonds.

Twila Grosse won the seat for the Progressive Conservatives.

== Results ==
Nova Scotia provincial by-election, August 8, 2023 Upon the resignation of Angela Simmonds
Party	Candidate	Votes	%	±%
Progressive Conservative	Twila Grosse	1,950	45.22	+16.53
New Democratic	Colter Simmonds	1,145	26.55	-1.37
Liberal	Carlo Simmons	1,021	23.68	-19.71
Green	Anthony Edmonds	101	2.34	–
Nova Scotians United	Bobby Taylor	95	2.20	–
Total valid votes		4,312	99.29	
Total rejected ballots		31	0.71	-0.08
Turnout		4,343	38.79	-7.56
Eligible voters		11,195		
Progressive Conservative gain from Liberal		Swing		+18.12
Source: Elections Nova Scotia

== See also ==
- List of Nova Scotia by-elections
