= Becky Kent =

Canadian politician

MLA for Cole Harbour-Eastern Passage
- In office October 2, 2007 – October 8, 2013
- Preceded by: Kevin Deveaux
- Succeeded by: Joyce Treen

Personal details
- Party: New Democratic Party
- Occupation: early childhood educator, municipal councillor

Rebecca J. Kent is a Canadian politician. She represented the electoral district of Cole Harbour-Eastern Passage in the Nova Scotia House of Assembly from 2007 to 2013. She was a member of the Nova Scotia New Democratic Party. She presently sits on the Halifax Regional Council.

Kent, an early childhood educator, was elected as a municipal councillor for the Halifax Regional Municipality district of Woodside-Eastern Passage in 2004. She entered provincial politics in October 2007, winning a by-election in the Cole Harbour-Eastern Passage riding. She was re-elected in the 2009 election. In January 2011, Kent was elected Deputy Speaker. In March 2013, she was appointed ministerial assistant to the Minister of Education. Kent was defeated by Liberal Joyce Treen when she ran for re-election in the 2013 election. In the 2020 Halifax municipal election, she returned to Halifax Regional Council as a councillor for Dartmouth South - Eastern Passage.

== Electoral record ==
2013 Nova Scotia general election Cole Harbour-Eastern Passage
Party	Candidate	Votes	%	±%
Liberal	Joyce Treen	3,057	40.62	
New Democratic Party	Becky Kent	2,914	38.72	
Progressive Conservative	Lloyd Jackson	1,555	20.66	

2009 Nova Scotia general election Cole Harbour-Eastern Passage
Party	Candidate	Votes	%	±%
New Democratic Party	Becky Kent	4,402	65.17	
Progressive Conservative Party	Lloyd Jackson	1,074	15.9	
Liberal Party	Orest Ulan	1,054	15.6	
Green	Denise Menard	225	3.33	–

Cole Harbour-Eastern Passage by-election 2 October 2007
Party	Candidate	Votes	%	±%
New Democratic Party	Becky Kent	2,459	44.39	
Progressive Conservative Party	Michael Eddy	1,863	33.63	
Liberal Party	Kelly Rambeau	958	17.30	
Green	Beverley Woodfield	259	4.68	–
