= Gabriel Hall =

African-American refugee (1801–1895)

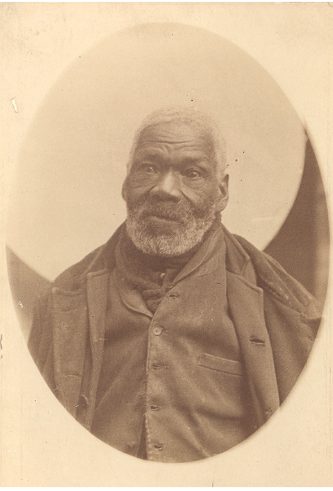
- Gabriel Hall in 1892
- Born: 1801; Calvert County, Maryland, United States
- Died: 1895 (aged 93–94); Halifax, Nova Scotia, Canada
- Citizenship: Canada
- Occupations: Slave; farmer
- Known for: Being the only Black refugee from the War of 1812 to be photographed

Gabriel Hall (1801 – 1895) was an African-American refugee from Maryland who fled to Nova Scotia from Maryland in 1815.

== Early life and escape ==
Born in 1801, in Calvert County, Maryland, Gabriel was born as a slave to a plantation owner named Walter Wells. In July 1814 during the War of 1812, when Gabriel was 13, he along with two other enslaved men escaped and fled to Preston and later Halifax, Nova Scotia.

== Life in Nova Scotia ==
In 1824, when Hall was 21-years-old, he petitioned the Canadian Government for land and received 25 acres. Hall married Lucinda Hall, a fellow Black refugee from America, and they settled in Preston and became members of the African Baptist Church. In 1891, Lucinda died and Hall was photographed a year later. In 1895, when Hall was in his mid-90s, Hall died of natural causes.
