= Eastern Shore (electoral district) =

Provincial electoral district in Nova Scotia, Canada

Nova Scotia electoral district

Provincial electoral district
- Legislature: Nova Scotia House of Assembly
MLA
Kent Smith
Progressive Conservative
- District created: 1967
- First contested: 1967
- Last contested: 2024

Demographics
- Population (2011): 15,720
- Electors: 11,765
- Area (km²): 2,252
- Pop. density (per km²): 7
- Census division: Halifax County
- Census subdivision: Halifax Regional Municipality

Eastern Shore is a provincial electoral district in Nova Scotia, Canada, that elects one member of the Nova Scotia House of Assembly.

In 1967, the district was created as Halifax Eastern Shore out of Halifax East and part of Halifax County Dartmouth. Upon the recommendations of the 1992 Electoral Boundaries Commission report, the district name was changed to Eastern Shore and it gained the Upper Lawrencetown area from Cole Harbour. In 2003, it gained an area on its western boundary from Dartmouth-Cole Harbour and lost an area on its eastern boundary to Guysborough-Sheet Harbour. In 2013, the district lost the Ross Road area to Preston-Dartmouth.

It is known as a bellwether district, having elected a government representative in every election since 1970.

== Geography ==
The land area of Eastern Shore is 2,252 km^{2} (870 sq mi).

== Members of the Legislative Assembly ==
This riding has elected the following members of the Legislative Assembly:

Eastern Shore
Legislature	Years	Member	Party
Halifax Eastern Shore; Riding created from Halifax County Dartmouth and Halifax East
49th	1967–1969	Duncan MacMillan	Liberal
49th	1969–1970	Alexander Garnet Brown	Liberal
50th	1970–1974	Alexander Garnet Brown	Liberal
51st	1974–1978	Alexander Garnet Brown	Liberal
52nd	1978–1981	Tom McInnis	Progressive Conservative
53rd	1981–1984	Tom McInnis	Progressive Conservative
54th	1984–1988	Tom McInnis	Progressive Conservative
55th	1988–1993	Tom McInnis	Progressive Conservative
Eastern Shore
56th	1993–1998	Keith Colwell	Liberal
57th	1998–1999	Keith Colwell	Liberal
58th	1999–2003	Bill Dooks	Progressive Conservative
59th	2003–2005	Bill Dooks	Progressive Conservative
60th	2006–2009	Bill Dooks	Progressive Conservative
61st	2009–2013	Sid Prest	New Democratic
62nd	2013–2017	Kevin Murphy	Liberal
63rd	2017–2021	Kevin Murphy	Liberal
64th	2021–2024	Kent Smith	Progressive Conservative
65th	2024–present	Kent Smith	Progressive Conservative

== Election results ==
=== 2024 ===
2024 Nova Scotia general election
Party	Candidate	Votes	%	±%
Progressive Conservative	Kent Smith	4,690	62.05%	16.22%
Liberal	Doyle Safire	1,441	19.06%	-14.99%
New Democratic	Don Carney	1,231	16.29%	-1.10%
Green	Kevin Conrod	197	2.61%	-0.12%
Total		7,559	100.00	–
Total rejected / Declined ballots		33	1	
Turnout		7,583		
Eligible voters		17,700	42.71%	
Progressive Conservative hold		Swing		
Source: Elections Nova Scotia

=== 2021 ===
2021 Nova Scotia general election
Party	Candidate	Votes	%	±%	Expenditures
Progressive Conservative	Kent Smith	4,264	45.82	+14.71	$38,052.56
Liberal	Kevin Murphy	3,169	34.06	-5.69	$45,473.02
New Democratic	Deirdre Dwyer	1,618	17.39	-7.27	$34,745.13
Green	Cheryl Atkinson	254	2.73	-0.04	$200.00
Total valid votes/expense limit		9,305	99.44	–	$94,668.78
Total rejected ballots		52	0.56		
Turnout		9,357	56.92		
Eligible voters		16,438			
Progressive Conservative gain from Liberal		Swing		+10.20	
Source: Elections Nova Scotia

=== 2017 ===
2017 provincial election redistributed results
Party	Vote	%
Liberal	3,345	39.75
Progressive Conservative	2,618	31.11
New Democratic	2,075	24.66
Green	233	2.77
Independent	145	1.72

2017 Nova Scotia general election
Party	Candidate	Votes	%	±%
Liberal	Kevin Murphy	2,527	37.71	-15.28
Progressive Conservative	Patricia Auchnie	2,024	30.20	+10.20
New Democratic	Devin Ashley	1,780	26.56	-0.45
Green	Andy Berry	221	3.30	–
Independent	Randy Carter	149	2.22	–
Total valid votes		6,701	100.00	–
Total rejected ballots		22	0.33	-0.59
Turnout		6,723	54.20	-5.71
Eligible voters		12,405		
Liberal hold		Swing		-12.74
Source: Elections Nova Scotia

=== 2013 ===
2013 Nova Scotia general election
Party	Candidate	Votes	%	±%
Liberal	Kevin Murphy	3,770	52.99%	39.53%
New Democratic	Sid Prest	1,922	27.01%	-22.21%
Progressive Conservative	Steve Brine	1,423	20.00%	-14.69%
Total		7,115	–	
Total rejected ballots		66	0.92	
Turnout		7,181	59.60	
Eligible voters		11,988		
Source(s) Source: Nova Scotia Legislature (2024). "Electoral History for Eastern Shore" (PDF). nslegislature.ca. Nova Scotia, Chief Electoral Officer (2013). 39th Provincial General Election, October 8, 2013: Volume 1 – Statement of Votes & Statistics (PDF) (Report). Elections Nova Scotia. Archived from the original (PDF) on 10 April 2018.

=== 2009 ===
2009 Nova Scotia general election
Party	Candidate	Votes	%	±%
New Democratic	Sid Prest	3,628	49.22%	8.38%
Progressive Conservative	Bill Dooks	2,557	34.69%	-11.28%
Liberal	Loretta Day Halleran	992	13.46%	2.85%
Green	Michael Marshall	194	2.63%	0.06%
Total		7,371	–	
Source(s) Source: Nova Scotia Legislature (2024). "Electoral History for Eastern Shore" (PDF). nslegislature.ca.

=== 2006 ===
2006 Nova Scotia general election
Party	Candidate	Votes	%	±%
Progressive Conservative	Bill Dooks	3,232	45.97%	0.96%
New Democratic	Sid Prest	2,871	40.84%	5.28%
Liberal	Judith Cabrita	746	10.61%	-8.81%
Green	Elizabeth van Dreunen	181	2.57%	–
Total		7,030	–	
Source(s) Source: Nova Scotia Legislature (2024). "Electoral History for Eastern Shore" (PDF). nslegislature.ca.

=== 2003 ===
2003 Nova Scotia general election
Party	Candidate	Votes	%	±%
Progressive Conservative	Bill Dooks	3,073	45.02%	3.17%
New Democratic	Sid Prest	2,427	35.56%	12.89%
Liberal	Randy Carter	1,326	19.43%	-11.59%
Total		6,826	–	
Source(s) Source: Nova Scotia Legislature (2024). "Electoral History for Eastern Shore" (PDF). nslegislature.ca.

=== 1999 ===
1999 Nova Scotia general election
Party	Candidate	Votes	%	±%
Progressive Conservative	Bill Dooks	3,637	41.85%	13.01%
Liberal	Keith Colwell	2,695	31.01%	-7.47%
New Democratic	Mary-Alice Tzagarakis	1,970	22.67%	-10.01%
Nova Scotia Party	Jack Friis	388	4.46%	–
Total		8,690	–	
Source(s) Source: Nova Scotia Legislature (2024). "Electoral History for Eastern Shore" (PDF). nslegislature.ca. Nova Scotia, Chief Electoral Officer (1999). Returns of the General Election for the House of Assembly, Thirty-Fifth General Election (Report). Elections Nova Scotia.

=== 1998 ===
1998 Nova Scotia general election
Party	Candidate	Votes	%	±%
Liberal	Keith Colwell	3,299	38.49%	-4.97%
New Democratic	Darren Richard	2,801	32.68%	16.85%
Progressive Conservative	Greg Brown	2,472	28.84%	-11.88%
Total		8,572	–	
Source(s) Source: Nova Scotia Legislature (2024). "Electoral History for Eastern Shore" (PDF). nslegislature.ca.

=== 1993 ===
1993 Nova Scotia general election
Party	Candidate	Votes	%	±%
Liberal	Keith Colwell	3,760	43.46%	7.75%
Progressive Conservative	Tom McInnis	3,523	40.72%	-13.29%
New Democratic	Gary Moore	1,369	15.82%	5.54%
Total		8,652	–	
Source(s) Source: Nova Scotia Legislature (2024). "Electoral History for Eastern Shore" (PDF). nslegislature.ca. Nova Scotia, Chief Electoral Officer (1993). Returns of the General Election for the House of Assembly, Thirty-Third General Election (PDF) (Report). Queen's Printer. Archived from the original (PDF) on 18 June 2018.

=== 1988 ===
1988 Nova Scotia general election: Halifax Eastern Shore
Party	Candidate	Votes	%	±%
Progressive Conservative	Tom McInnis	5,762	54.01%	-8.73%
Liberal	Eric Hill	3,810	35.71%	10.70%
New Democratic	David Noseworthy	1,097	10.28%	-1.96%
Total		10,669	–	
Source(s) Source: Nova Scotia Legislature (2024). "Electoral History for Halifax Eastern Shore" (PDF). nslegislature.ca. Nova Scotia, Chief Electoral Officer (1988). Returns of the General Election for the House of Assembly, Thirty-Second General Election (PDF) (Report). Queen's Printer. Archived from the original (PDF) on 7 July 2018.

=== 1984 ===
1984 Nova Scotia general election: Halifax Eastern Shore
Party	Candidate	Votes	%	±%
Progressive Conservative	Tom McInnis	5,395	62.74%	3.42%
Liberal	Paul MacKenzie	2,151	25.01%	0.80%
New Democratic	Kevin Wilson	1,053	12.25%	-4.22%
Total		8,599	–	
Source(s) Source: Nova Scotia Legislature (2024). "Electoral History for Halifax Eastern Shore" (PDF). nslegislature.ca. Nova Scotia, Chief Electoral Officer (1984). Returns of the General Election for the House of Assembly, Thirty-First General Election (PDF) (Report). Queen's Printer. Archived from the original (PDF) on 31 July 2017.

=== 1981 ===
1981 Nova Scotia general election: Halifax Eastern Shore
Party	Candidate	Votes	%	±%
Progressive Conservative	Tom McInnis	5,639	59.32%	5.04%
Liberal	Angus MacNeil	2,302	24.22%	-15.85%
New Democratic	Bruce Beasley	1,565	16.46%	10.81%
Total		9,506	–	
Source(s) Source: Nova Scotia Legislature (2024). "Electoral History for Halifax Eastern Shore" (PDF). nslegislature.ca. Nova Scotia, Chief Electoral Officer (1981). Returns of the General Election for the House of Assembly, Thirtieth General Election (PDF) (Report). Queen's Printer. Archived from the original (PDF) on 31 July 2017.

=== 1978 ===
1978 Nova Scotia general election: Halifax Eastern Shore
Party	Candidate	Votes	%	±%
Progressive Conservative	Tom McInnis	5,298	54.28%	19.72%
Liberal	Alexander Garnet Brown	3,911	40.07%	-12.83%
New Democratic	Daniel Matheson	552	5.66%	-6.89%
Total		9,761	–	
Source(s) Source: Nova Scotia Legislature (2024). "Electoral History for Halifax Eastern Shore" (PDF). nslegislature.ca. Nova Scotia, Chief Electoral Officer (1978). Returns of the General Election for the House of Assembly, Twenty-Ninth General Election (PDF) (Report). Queen's Printer. Archived from the original (PDF) on 18 June 2018.

=== 1974 ===
1974 Nova Scotia general election: Halifax Eastern Shore
Party	Candidate	Votes	%	±%
Liberal	Alexander Garnet Brown	6,437	52.90%	-5.20%
Progressive Conservative	Hanson D. Josey	4,205	34.56%	-7.35%
New Democratic	John T. Kennedy	1,527	12.55%	–
Total		12,169	–	
Source(s) Source: Nova Scotia Legislature (2024). "Electoral History for Halifax Eastern Shore" (PDF). nslegislature.ca. Nova Scotia, Chief Electoral Officer (1974). Returns of the General Election for the House of Assembly, Twenty-Eighth General Election (PDF) (Report). Queen's Printer. Archived from the original (PDF) on 18 June 2018.

=== 1970 ===
1970 Nova Scotia general election: Halifax Eastern Shore
Party	Candidate	Votes	%	±%
Liberal	Alexander Garnet Brown	5,585	58.09%	4.36%
Progressive Conservative	Murray E. Ritcey	4,029	41.91%	0.88%
Total		9,614	–	
Source(s) Source: Nova Scotia Legislature (2024). "Electoral History for Halifax Eastern Shore" (PDF). nslegislature.ca. Nova Scotia, Legislative Assembly (1970). Returns of the General Election for the House of Assembly, 1970 (PDF) (Report). Queen's Printer. Archived from the original (PDF) on 25 July 2018.

=== 1969 ===
Nova Scotia provincial by-election, July 8, 1969: Halifax Eastern Shore Death of Duncan MacMillan on April 10, 1969
Party	Candidate	Votes	%	±%
Liberal	Alexander Garnet Brown	4,026	53.74%	4.26%
Progressive Conservative	Murray S. Prest	3,074	41.03%	-2.33%
New Democratic	Stephen Hart	392	5.23%	-1.93%
Total		7,492	–	
Source(s) Source: Nova Scotia Legislature (2024). "Electoral History for Halifax Eastern Shore" (PDF). nslegislature.ca.

=== 1967 ===
1967 Nova Scotia general election: Halifax Eastern Shore
Party	Candidate	Votes	%	±%
Liberal	Duncan MacMillan	4,201	49.48%	–
Progressive Conservative	Nelson Gaetz	3,682	43.36%	–
New Democratic	James Yetman	608	7.16%	–
Total		8,491	–	
Source(s) Source: Nova Scotia Legislature (2024). "Electoral History for Halifax Eastern Shore" (PDF). nslegislature.ca. Nova Scotia Legislature (1967). Returns of the General Election for the House of Assembly (PDF) (Report). Queen's Printer. Archived from the original (PDF) on 25 July 2018.

== See also ==
- List of Nova Scotia provincial electoral districts
- Canadian provincial electoral districts
