= Keonte Beals =

Canadian musician

- Origin: North Preston, Nova Scotia
- Genres: R&B
- Occupations: Singer, author
- Instruments: Vocals, piano

Keonte Beals is a Canadian R&B singer and author from North Preston, Nova Scotia.

Keonte is best known for his 2020 album KING, which was nominated for eight Music Nova Scotia Awards, winning three. In 2021, he wrote and published the children's book I Am Perfectly Me.

== Discography ==
=== Albums ===
- Keonte (2017)
- King (2020)

== Awards and nominations ==
Year	Award	Category	Nominated	Result	Ref
2015	African Nova Scotian Music Awards	Emerging Artist of the Year	Keonte Beals	Won	
2016	Music Nova Scotia Awards	Inspirational Recording of the Year	Man Down	Won	
2016	African Nova Scotian Music Awards	Rising Star	Keonte Beals	Won	
2017	Best of Halifax Awards	Best R&B Artist/Band	Keonte Beals	Bronze	
2019	Music Nova Scotia Awards	African Nova Scotian Artist of the Year	Keonte Beals	Won	
2020	African Nova Scotian Music Awards	Artist of the Year	Keonte Beals	Won	
2021	East Coast Music Awards	R&B/Soul Recording of the Year	KING	Won	
2021	African Nova Scotian Music Awards	Single of the Year	KING	Won	
2021	Music Nova Scotia Awards	African Nova Scotian Artist of the Year	Keonte Beals	Won	
2021	Music Nova Scotia	Inspirational Recording of the Year	KING	Won	
2021	Music Nova Scotia	R&B/Soul Recording of the Year	KING	Won	
