= Yvonne Atwell =

Canadian politician

Member of the Nova Scotia House of Assembly for Preston
- In office March 24, 1998 – June 18, 1999
- Preceded by: Wayne Adams
- Succeeded by: David Hendsbee

Personal details
- Born: 1943 (age 82–83) East Preston, Nova Scotia, Canada
- Party: NDP

Yvonne Atwell (born 1943) is a Canadian community activist, former provincial politician and former hospital administrator. She is known for being the first Black woman elected to the Nova Scotia House of Assembly.

== Early life and education ==
Yvonne Atwell was born in East Preston, Nova Scotia, in 1943. Frustrated by the discrimination she experienced as a Black Nova Scotian, she left the province in 1960, spending 24 years in Toronto. She studied at Centennial College in Ontario and at Dalhousie University in Nova Scotia.

== Career ==
Atwell worked for 20 years as an administrator at Mount Sinai Hospital in Toronto, Ontario, eventually rising to the position of Head of Patient Services. She returned to Nova Scotia in 1984 after inheriting land from her father.

From 1993-98 she was the first Managing Director of the African-Canadian Employment Clinic in Halifax.

In 1996, Atwell ran unsuccessfully for the leadership of the Nova Scotia New Democratic Party in its 1996 leadership election. She won a seat in the Nova Scotia House of Assembly in 1998 for the riding of Preston, becoming the first Black woman MLA in the province. She represented the district until the 1999 provincial election when she lost her seat to David Hendsbee. During her term in office she served as the Opposition Critic for Status of Women, and Business Consumer Services.

Between 1999-2004, Atwell worked as Policy Advisor and Diversity Officer at the Maritime Centre of Excellence for Women's Health, Dalhousie University.

Atwell has also been Executive Director of Community Justice Society, Executive Director of the Black United Front, President of the African Canadian Caucus of Nova Scotia, Chair of the Indigenous Blacks & Mi’kmaq Initiative at the Schulich School of Law, Dalhousie University, a member of the Metropolitan Board of Trade's small business committee, a member of the George Washington Carver Credit Union executive board, and a member of the Board of Directors of the Canadian Society of Immigration Consultants.

== Honours and legacy ==
In 2002, Atwell was awarded the Queen Elizabeth II Golden Jubilee Medal for her contributions to public life.

In 2004, Atwell was inducted to the Rev Dr William Pearly Oliver Wall of Honour by the Black Cultural Society of Nova Scotia.

On March 1, 2020, the Nova Scotia New Democratic Party renamed their Diversity Fund to be called the Yvonne Atwell Diversity in Leadership Fund in recognition of "Yvonne Atwell's leadership in the legislature and her consistent encouragement of candidates with diverse backgrounds to seek public office".

On February 22, 2022, a portrait of Atwell was unveiled at Province House in Halifax to honour her and commemorate her historic role as the first Black woman to be elected in Nova Scotia. Her portrait is displayed in the Province House lobby alongside the portraits of former premiers of Nova Scotia.
