= 2007 Cole Harbour-Eastern Passage provincial by-election =

Election held in Nova Scotia, Canada

- October 2, 2007

Riding of Cole Harbour-Eastern Passage
	First party	Second party	Third party
	NDP	PC	Lib
Candidate	Becky Kent	Michael Eddy	Kelly Rambeau
Party	New Democratic	Progressive Conservative	Liberal
Popular vote	2,459	1,863	958
Percentage	44.39%	33.63%	17.30%
Swing	▼20.01%	▲14.71%	▲2.07%
MLA before election
Kevin Deveaux
New Democratic
Elected MLA
Becky Kent
New Democratic

A provincial by-election was held in Nova Scotia on 2 October 2007 to fill the vacancy in the House of Assembly riding of Cole Harbour-Eastern Passage. The byelection resulted from the resignation of New Democrat MLA Kevin Deveaux. New Democrat Becky Kent won the byelection by almost 600 votes.

Cole Harbour-Eastern Passage by-election, 2 October 2007
Party	Candidate	Votes	%	±%
New Democratic Party	Becky Kent	2,459	44.39	-20.01
Progressive Conservative Party	Michael Eddy	1,863	33.63	+14.71
Liberal Party	Kelly Rambeau	958	17.30	+2.07
Green	Beverley Woodfield	259	4.68	+2.24
