= Duncan MacMillan (Nova Scotia politician) =

Nova Scotia politician

MLA for Halifax Eastern Shore
- In office 1967 – April 10, 1969
- Preceded by: new riding
- Succeeded by: Alexander Garnet Brown

MLA for Halifax East
- In office 1956–1963
- Preceded by: Geoffrey W. Stevens
- Succeeded by: Nelson Gaetz

Personal details
- Born: July 17, 1897 East Lake Ainslie, Nova Scotia
- Died: April 10, 1969 (aged 71) Halifax, Nova Scotia
- Party: Liberal
- Occupation: physician, surgeon

Duncan MacMillan (July 17, 1897 – April 10, 1969) was a Canadian politician. He represented the electoral district of Halifax East in the Nova Scotia House of Assembly from 1956 to 1963, and Halifax Eastern Shore from 1967 to 1969. He was a member of the Nova Scotia Liberal Party.

Born in 1897 at East Lake Ainslie, Inverness County, Nova Scotia to Hugh and Margaret (MacKinnon) MacMillan, MacMillan was a physician and surgeon. He graduated from Dalhousie University in 1928. He married Lillian Elspeth Campbell in 1941. From 1949 to 1952, MacMillan was a municipal councillor in Halifax, Nova Scotia, and also served as the medical health officer for Halifax County.

MacMillan entered provincial politics in the 1956 election, winning the Halifax East riding. He was re-elected in the 1960 election. In the 1963 election, MacMillan was defeated by Progressive Conservative Nelson Gaetz. MacMillan ran again in the 1967 election, and defeated Gaetz by 519 votes in the new Halifax Eastern Shore riding. MacMillan died in office on April 10, 1969.
