= Kent Smith (Canadian politician) =

Canadian politician

The Honourable Kent Smith ECNS MLA

Member of the Nova Scotia House of Assembly for Eastern Shore
- Incumbent
- Assumed office August 17, 2021
- Preceded by: Kevin Murphy

Personal details
- Born: James Brian Kent Smith; December 27
- Party: Progressive Conservative

James Brian Kent Smith (born December 27) is a Canadian politician who was elected to the Nova Scotia House of Assembly in the 2021 Nova Scotia general election. He represents the riding of Eastern Shore as a member of the Progressive Conservative Association of Nova Scotia.

On September 14, 2023, Smith was appointed to the Executive Council of Nova Scotia as Minister of Fisheries and Aquaculture.

He is an entrepreneur and active community volunteer.

== Electoral record ==
2024 Nova Scotia general election: Eastern Shore
Party	Candidate	Votes	%	±%
Progressive Conservative	Kent Smith	4,690	62.05%	16.22%
Liberal	Doyle Safire	1,441	19.06%	-14.99%
New Democratic	Don Carney	1,231	16.29%	-1.10%
Green	Kevin Conrod	197	2.61%	-0.12%
Total		7,559	100.00	–
Total rejected / Declined ballots		33	1	
Turnout		7,583		
Eligible voters		17,700	42.71%	
Progressive Conservative hold		Swing		
Source: Elections Nova Scotia

2021 Nova Scotia general election: Eastern Shore
Party	Candidate	Votes	%	±%	Expenditures
Progressive Conservative	Kent Smith	4,264	45.82	+14.71	$38,052.56
Liberal	Kevin Murphy	3,169	34.06	-5.69	$45,473.02
New Democratic	Deirdre Dwyer	1,618	17.39	-7.27	$34,745.13
Green	Cheryl Atkinson	254	2.73	-0.04	$200.00
Total valid votes/expense limit		9,305	99.44	–	$94,668.78
Total rejected ballots		52	0.56		
Turnout		9,357	56.92		
Eligible voters		16,438			
Progressive Conservative gain from Liberal		Swing		+10.20	
Source: Elections Nova Scotia
