= Dwayne Provo =

Canadian athlete, school administrator, and politician

Profile
- Position: DB

Personal information
- Born: October 7, 1970 (age 56); North Preston, Nova Scotia, Canada
- Listed height: 5 ft 11 in (1.80 m)
- Listed weight: 185 lb (84 kg)

Career information
- High school: Cole Harbour District High School
- University: Saint Mary's University
- CFL draft: 1995: 1st round, 10th overall pick

Career history
- 1995–1996: Saskatchewan Roughriders
- 1996–1998: Montreal Alouettes
- 1998–2000: Edmonton Eskimos
- 2001: Toronto Argonauts
- 2002: Ottawa Renegades
- 2002: BC Lions

Dwayne Provo (born October 7, 1970) is a Canadian athlete, school administrator, and politician.

== Early life ==
Provo was born in North Preston, Nova Scotia (one of Canada's largest Black communities) and attended university at Saint Mary's University where he played Canadian football and was drafted in 1995 by the Saskatchewan Roughriders.

== Professional football career ==
He went on to play professional football in the Canadian Football League for 8 years (as well as a brief stint in the National Football League). Since retiring from football he has taken further university studies and worked as a school administrator.

== Political career ==
In the 2006 Nova Scotia election, he ran as the Progressive Conservative candidate for the riding of Preston, but finished second to Liberal Keith Colwell. In 2009, he ran again but placed third behind Colwell and New Democrat Janet Sutcliffe. He is a cousin to boxer Kirk Johnson and hockey player Evander Kane.

== Electoral history ==
2009 Nova Scotia general election: Preston
Party	Candidate	Votes	%	±%
Liberal	Keith Colwell	1,908	42.20	+0.07
New Democratic Party	Janet Sutcliffe	1,316	29.11	+9.94
Progressive Conservative	Dwayne Provo	1,240	27.43	-9.40
Green	Sarah Densmore	57	1.26	-0.60

2006 Nova Scotia general election: Preston
Party	Candidate	Votes	%	±%
Liberal	Keith Colwell	1,853	42.13	–
Progressive Conservative	Dwayne Provo	1,610	36.83	–
New Democratic Party	Douglas Sparks	843	19.17	–
Green	David Farrell	82	1.86	–
