= Kevin Murphy (Canadian politician) =

Canadian politician

The Honourable Kevin S. Murphy

Speaker of the House of Assembly of Nova Scotia
- In office October 24, 2013 – July 17, 2021
- Preceded by: Gordie Gosse
- Succeeded by: Keith Bain

Member of the Nova Scotia House of Assembly for Eastern Shore
- In office October 8, 2013 – July 17, 2021
- Preceded by: Sid Prest
- Succeeded by: Kent Smith

Personal details
- Born: 1970 (age 55–56) Dartmouth, Nova Scotia
- Party: Liberal
- Occupation: Publisher

Kevin Scott Murphy (born 1970 in Dartmouth, Nova Scotia) is a Canadian politician, who was elected to the Nova Scotia House of Assembly in the 2013 provincial election. A member of the Nova Scotia Liberal Party, he represented the electoral district of Eastern Shore from 2013 to 2021. On October 24, 2013, Murphy was elected Speaker of the House of Assembly of Nova Scotia.

Murphy owns Shop the Shore, a community and business publication. He was paralyzed during a hockey game when he was 14 years old and became a paraplegic as a result.

== Electoral record ==
2021 Nova Scotia general election: Eastern Shore
Party	Candidate	Votes	%	±%
Progressive Conservative	Kent Smith	4,264	45.82	+14.71
Liberal	Kevin Murphy	3,169	34.06	-5.69
New Democratic	Deirdre Dwyer	1,618	17.39	-7.27
Green	Cheryl Atkinson	254	2.73	-0.04
Total valid votes		9,305	99.44	
Total rejected ballots		52	0.56	
Turnout		9,357	56.92	
Eligible voters		16,438		
Progressive Conservative gain from Liberal		Swing		+10.20
Source: Elections Nova Scotia

2017 Nova Scotia general election
Party	Candidate	Votes	%	±%
Liberal	Kevin Murphy	2,527	37.71	-15.28
Progressive Conservative	Patricia Auchnie	2,024	30.20	+10.20
New Democratic	Devin Ashley	1,780	26.56	-0.45
Green	Andy Berry	221	3.30	
Independent	Randy Carter	149	2.22	
Total valid votes		6,701	100.00	
Total rejected ballots		22	0.33	-0.59
Turnout		6,723	54.20	-5.71
Eligible voters		12,405		
Liberal hold		Swing		-12.74

2013 Nova Scotia general election
Party	Candidate	Votes	%	±%
Liberal	Kevin Murphy	3,770	52.99	
New Democratic Party	Sid Prest	1,922	27.01	
Progressive Conservative	Steve Brine	1,423	20.00	
