= Bill Horne =

Canadian politician (born 1948)

Member of the Nova Scotia House of Assembly for Waverley-Fall River-Beaver Bank
- In office October 8, 2013 – July 17, 2021
- Preceded by: Percy Paris
- Succeeded by: Brian Wong

Personal details
- Born: William Horace Horne; March 28, 1948 (age 78)
- Party: Liberal

William H. Horne (born March 28, 1948) is a Canadian politician. He was elected to the Nova Scotia House of Assembly in the 2013 provincial election. A member of the Nova Scotia Liberal Party, he represented the electoral district of Waverley-Fall River-Beaver Bank.

Horne graduated from Saint Mary's University in 1972 with a Bachelor of Science.

== Electoral record ==
2013 Nova Scotia general election
Party	Candidate	Votes	%	±%
Liberal	Bill Horne	3,588	43.09	
Progressive Conservative	Brian Wong	2,640	31.71	
New Democratic Party	Percy Paris	2,098	25.02	

2009 Nova Scotia general election
Party	Candidate	Votes	%	±%
New Democratic Party	Percy Paris	5,007	54.47	
Liberal	Bill Horne	2,290	24.91	
Progressive Conservative	Gary Hines	1,696	18.45	
Green	Damon Loomer	199	2.16	–
