= Angela Simmonds =

Canadian politician

Angela Simmonds MLA
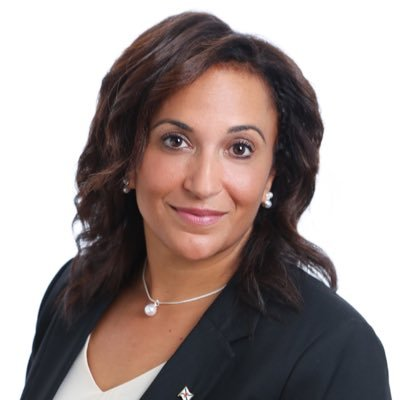

Member of the Nova Scotia House of Assembly for Preston
- In office August 17, 2021 – April 1, 2023
- Preceded by: Riding Established
- Succeeded by: Twila Grosse

Executive Director of the Land Titles Initiative
- In office March 5, 2021 – August 17, 2021

Personal details
- Party: Nova Scotia Liberal Party
- Education: Dalhousie University
- Occupation: Lawyer, politician, social justice advocate, executive
- Website: Nova Scotia Legislature Website: https://nslegislature.ca/members/profiles/angela-simmonds

Angela Eve Simmonds is a Canadian politician and lawyer who was elected to the Nova Scotia House of Assembly in the 2021 Nova Scotia general election. She represented the riding of Preston as a member of the Nova Scotia Liberal Party until April 1, 2023. Prior to her election, she was a lawyer, social justice advocate, and executive director of the Land Titles Initiative.

Simmonds announced on January 25, 2023, that she would step down as MLA for Preston on April 1 of that year.

== Career and land titles initiative ==
Professionally, Simmonds is a lawyer. In 2014, she authored a document titled "This Land is Our Land: African Nova Scotian Voices from the Preston Area Speak Up". The document discussed how African Nova Scotian communities in the Preston area continue to face ongoing concerns regarding the expropriation of land, clarity of land titles and education regarding land ownership and inheritance. Simmonds also writes about the community's challenges with systemic racism, oppression and inequality, and the issues that stem from it. Following the publication of the document, Simmonds continued her advocacy for land titles to be granted to those residing on unregistered land. She was also named executive director of the Land Titles Initiative on March 5, 2021, by the Equity and Anti-Racism Initiatives. Following Simmonds' election in August 2021, she stepped down from the role.

== Political career ==
Simmonds was one of four Black Canadians elected to the Nova Scotia legislature in 2021. On September 24, 2021, Simmonds was elected Deputy Speaker of the House of Assembly, which makes Simmonds the first African Nova Scotian speaker in the province's history. Simmonds is a member of the Law Amendments Committee. She is also a member of the House of Assembly Management Commission.

Simmonds is the Justice Critic within the Nova Scotia Liberal Caucus

On October 29, 2021, the House of Assembly voted to condemn a Justice Ministry staff member who was later fired after making racist comments against Simmonds on social media.

=== 2022 Liberal leadership campaign ===
On February 4, 2022, Simmonds launched her campaign for leader of the Nova Scotia Liberal Party following Iain Rankin's announcement that he would be stepping down. She was the first person to declare their candidacy for Leader of the Nova Scotia Liberal Party. Simmonds' leadership campaign slogan was "New Energy for Nova Scotians". On July 9, 2022, she lost the leadership election to Zach Churchill.

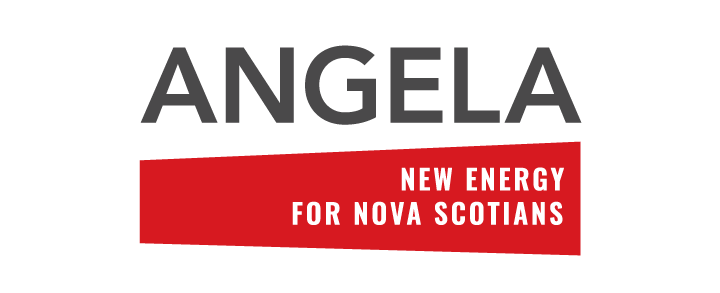
Simmonds' leadership campaign logo

=== Resignation ===
Simmonds announced her resignation as MLA for Preston in January 2023. Her resignation became effective on April 1, 2023. In the 2023 Preston provincial by-election, the seat was taken by Progressive Conservative Twila Grosse with the Liberal candidate being pushed into third place.

== Bills introduced ==
Assembly	Act Title	Date
Assembly 64, Session 1	Dismantling Racism and Hate Act	October 13, 2021

== Electoral record ==
2021 Nova Scotia general election
Party	Candidate	Votes	%	±%
Liberal	Angela Simmonds	2,226	43.38	-5.66
Progressive Conservative	Archy Beals	1,472	28.69	+6.00
New Democratic	Colter C.C. Simmonds	1,433	27.93	+4.36
Total valid votes		5,131	99.21	
Total rejected ballots		41	0.79	
Turnout		5,172	46.78	
Eligible voters		11,055		
Liberal notional hold		Swing		-5.83
Source: Elections Nova Scotia

=== Liberal leadership 2022 results ===
Candidate	Ballot 1	
Name	Votes	Points
Zach Churchill	2,186; 66.50%	3,580.00; 65.09%
Angela Simmonds	1,101; 33.50%	1,920.00; 34.91%
TOTAL	3,287	5,500
