= Gary Hines (politician) =

Canadian politician

MLA for Waverley-Fall River-Beaver Bank
- In office 2003–2006
- Preceded by: Riding established
- Succeeded by: Percy Paris

Personal details
- Born: 1946 (age 79–80) Truro, Nova Scotia
- Party: Progressive Conservative

Gary Hines is a Canadian politician. He represented the electoral district of Waverley-Fall River-Beaver Bank in the Nova Scotia House of Assembly from 2003 to 2006 as a member of the Progressive Conservatives.

Born in Truro, Nova Scotia, Hines was educated at the Nova Scotia Agricultural College. He founded Garrick Construction and was president of Fundy Adventures. In 2000, Hines was elected a municipal councillor in the Halifax Regional Municipality. Hines entered provincial politics in 2003, defeating New Democrat Percy Paris by 363 votes in the newly established Waverley-Fall River-Beaver Bank riding. He was defeated by Paris when he ran for re-election in 2006. Hines ran again in the 2009 election, but finished third behind Paris, and Liberal Bill Horne.
