= East Preston, Nova Scotia =

Community in Nova Scotia, Canada

Coordinates: 44°43′16″N 63°25′0″W

East Preston in Nova Scotia

East Preston is an expansive rural community located in eastern Halifax Regional Municipality, Nova Scotia, in Atlantic Canada. The population at the time of the 2016 census was 869. Like its neighbouring community, North Preston, the community is composed predominantly of Black Nova Scotians.

== Geography ==
East Preston is within the Halifax Regional Municipality. It is located east of another rural area, Preston. East Preston is accessible off Trunk 7 or No 207 on Marine Drive through the Ross Road or the Mineville Road.

== History ==
Historical populations
Year	Pop.	±%
1981	1,020	—
1986	1,210	+18.6%
1996	990	−18.2%
2006	888	−10.3%
2016	869	−2.1%
Source: Statistics Canada (Note: Statistics Canada and City of Halifax planning Data)

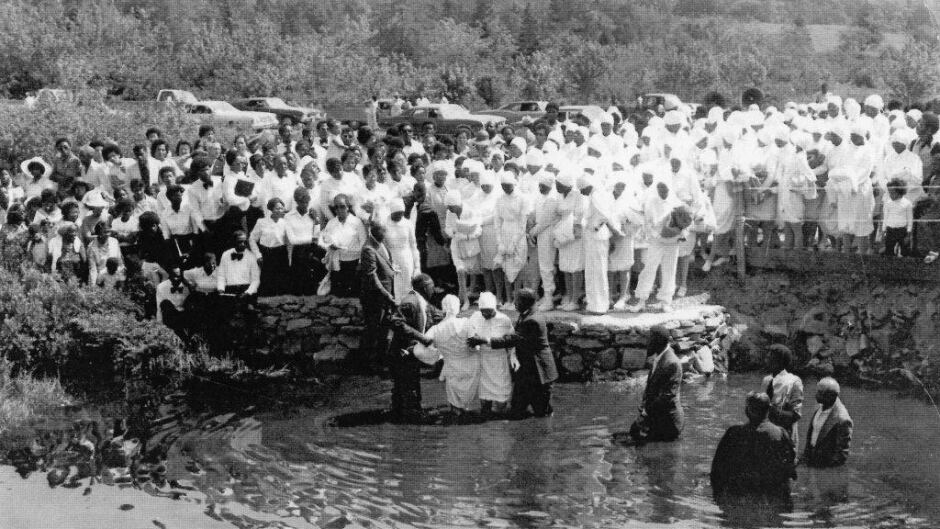
Reverend Dr. Donald D. Skeir leads a mass baptism on the Partridge River in East Preston. (1976)

East Preston was founded in the 19th century. It is believed to have been named after Preston, Lancashire, England or Thomas Preston, a British army officer involved in the Boston Massacre during the American Revolution. While it is often thought that the community is named after Rev. Richard Preston, the famous African Nova Scotia leader and minister, the community was established long before he arrived. Preston arrived after escaping American slavery, in search of his mother. She had escaped earlier and was settled in Preston, living free. He was so impressed that he took the name of her community as his surname. Rev. Preston started the two churches which are still located in this region. At first, the two communities of East and North Preston were a whole. Known simply as Preston, soon the two would identify themselves differently by adding the North and East in front of it. East and North Preston are well known across the Maritimes; together they form the largest indigenous black community in Canada founded before the 20th century.

At one time when Preston was important as the source of market garden produce, East Preston also played an important role in supplying produce from small farm holdings. The area contains a large number of very popular lakes used for recreation. The boundaries of the Prestons have shrunken continually over the years. It once stretched from Porters Lake to the East, to well into the current confines of Dartmouth. Its current boundaries have been established since the mid-1970s.

East Preston was predominantly a Black Canadian community in its early days, descended from Black Loyalists who were relocated here by the Crown following the American Revolutionary War. To a degree the community has retained this traditional culture. But, with the demand for land and the growth of the city of Halifax, many people from other areas have joined the community. The local Recreation Centre and Black Baptist Church provide a focus for the many Black families. Currently, North Preston has a nearly 100% Black population and East Preston has a Black population of about 80%. A road exists that directly connects the two villages.

Just east of East Preston, the area around Porters Lake has had an in-migration of new residents and business. This community serves as a shopping district for East Preston and other surrounding communities.

== Notable people ==
- Yvonne Atwell, politician
- Wanda Thomas Bernard, educator, social worker, Canadian senator
- Richard Preston, founder, East Preston United Baptist Church (took community name as surname after being reunited with his mother in the community)
- Shay Colley, Team Canada olympic basketball player
- Floyd Kane, film director, screenwriter, producer
