= Bill Dooks =

Canadian politician

The Honourable Bill Dooks ECNS

MLA for Eastern Shore
- In office 1999–2009
- Preceded by: Keith Colwell
- Succeeded by: Sid Prest

Personal details
- Born: January 24, 1956 (age 70) Musquodoboit Harbour, Nova Scotia
- Party: Progressive Conservative

Bill Dooks (born January 24, 1956) is a Canadian politician, who served as the Progressive Conservative member for Eastern Shore in the Nova Scotia House of Assembly from 1999 to 2009.

Born in Musquodoboit Harbour, Nova Scotia, Dooks worked in banking before entering politics. He was first elected to Halifax County Council in 1994. He was re-elected in 1996 to sit on the newly formed Halifax Regional Council, when Halifax County was amalgamated with the cities of Halifax, Dartmouth, and the town of Bedford.

Dooks entered provincial politics in the 1999 election, defeating Liberal cabinet minister Keith Colwell in the riding of Eastern Shore. In September 1999, Dooks was appointed Deputy House Leader for the Government. He was re-elected in the 2003 election. In February 2006, he was appointed to the Executive Council of Nova Scotia as Minister of Energy. Dooks was re-elected in the 2006 election, and remained Minister of Energy until October 23, 2007, when he was shuffled to Minister of Tourism, Culture, and Heritage. He was defeated by New Democrat Sid Prest when he ran for re-election in the 2009 election.
