= Nelson Gaetz =

Canadian politician

Nelson E. Gaetz

MLA for Halifax East
- In office 1963–1967
- Preceded by: Duncan MacMillan
- Succeeded by: riding dissolved

Personal details
- Born: March 1, 1907 Chezzetcook, Nova Scotia
- Died: April 26, 1988 (aged 81)
- Party: Progressive Conservative
- Occupation: farmer

Nelson Edward Gaetz (March 1, 1907 – April 26, 1988) was a Canadian politician. He represented the electoral district of Halifax East in the Nova Scotia House of Assembly from 1963 to 1967. He was a member of the Progressive Conservative Party of Nova Scotia.

== Biography ==
Born in 1907 at Chezzetcook, Nova Scotia, Gaetz was a farmer. He married Sadie Theresa Gaetz in 1931. Gaetz first attempted to enter provincial politics in the 1960 election, but was defeated by Liberal incumbent Duncan MacMillan in the Halifax East riding. In May 1962, Gaetz was elected a municipal councillor for Halifax County. He ran again in the 1963 provincial election, and defeated MacMillan by 305 votes. In the 1967 election, Gaetz was defeated by MacMillan in the new Halifax Eastern Shore riding. Gaetz died on April 26, 1988.
