= Waverley-Fall River-Beaver Bank =

Provincial electoral district in Nova Scotia, Canada

Nova Scotia electoral district

Provincial electoral district
- Legislature: Nova Scotia House of Assembly
MLA
Brian Wong
Progressive Conservative
- District created: 2003
- First contested: 2003
- Last contested: 2024

Demographics
- Population (2011): 22,348
- Electors: 13,309
- Area (km²): 299
- Pop. density (per km²): 74.7
- Census division: Halifax County
- Census subdivision: Halifax Regional Municipality

Waverley-Fall River-Beaver Bank is a provincial electoral district in Nova Scotia, Canada, that elects one member of the Nova Scotia House of Assembly.

It was created in 2003 from Bedford-Fall River and Sackville-Beaver Bank. In 2013, it lost a portion of Beaver Bank to Sackville and the Portobello area to Dartmouth East.

== Geography ==
Waverley-Fall River-Beaver Bank covers 299 km^{2} (115 sq mi) of land.

== Members of the Legislative Assembly ==
This riding has elected the following members of the Legislative Assembly:

Waverley-Fall River-Beaver Bank
Legislature	Years	Member	Party
Riding created from Bedford-Fall River and Sackville-Beaver Bank
59th	2003–2006	Gary Hines	Progressive Conservative
60th	2006–2009	Percy Paris	New Democratic
61st	2009–2013	Percy Paris	New Democratic
62nd	2013–2017	Bill Horne	Liberal
63rd	2017–2021	Bill Horne	Liberal
64th	2021–2024	Brian Wong	Progressive Conservative
65th	2024–present	Brian Wong	Progressive Conservative

== Election results ==
=== 2024 ===
2024 Nova Scotia general election
Party	Candidate	Votes	%	±%
Progressive Conservative	Brian Wong	4,653	56.70	+16.32
Liberal	Elizabeth Booth	1,635	19.92	-16.44
New Democratic	Donna McCarthy	1,575	19.19	+2.98
Green	Anthony Edmonds	344	4.19	-2.13
Total valid votes		8,207		
Total rejected ballots		36		
Turnout		8,244	45.20	
Eligible voters		18,237		
Progressive Conservative hold		Swing		
Source: Elections Nova Scotia

=== 2021 ===
2021 Nova Scotia general election
Party	Candidate	Votes	%	±%	Expenditures
Progressive Conservative	Brian Wong	3,938	40.38	+3.02	$33,476.85
Liberal	Marni Tuttle	3,546	36.36	-0.74	$36,707.22
New Democratic	Christina McCarron	1,581	16.21	-2.86	$35,608.26
Green	Anthony Edmonds	617	6.33	-0.06	$5,170.04
Atlantica	Shawn Whitford	71	0.73	+0.63	$200.00
Total valid votes/expense limit		9,753	99.86	–	$98,713.68
Total rejected ballots		14	0.14		
Turnout		9,767	56.55		
Eligible voters		17,272			
Progressive Conservative notional hold		Swing		+1.88	
Source: Elections Nova Scotia

=== 2017 ===
2017 provincial election redistributed results
Party	Vote	%
Progressive Conservative	3,453	37.51
Liberal	3,429	37.26
New Democratic	1,763	19.15
Green	590	5.98
Atlantica	9	0.10

2017 Nova Scotia general election
Party	Candidate	Votes	%	±%
Liberal	Bill Horne	3,160	37.94	-5.15
Progressive Conservative	Dan McNaughton	3,095	37.16	+5.45
New Democratic	Trevor Sanipass	1,567	18.82	-6.20
Green	Anthony Edmonds	506	6.08	
Total valid votes		8,328	100	
Total rejected ballots		43	0.51	
Turnout		8,371	56.02	
Eligible voters		14,944		
Liberal hold		Swing		-5.30
Source: Elections Nova Scotia

=== 2013 ===
2013 Nova Scotia general election
Party	Candidate	Votes	%	±%
Liberal	Bill Horne	3,588	43.09	18.18
Progressive Conservative	Brian Wong	2,640	31.71	13.26
New Democratic	Percy Paris	2,098	25.20	-29.27
Total		8,326	–	
Source(s) Source: Nova Scotia Legislature (2024). "Electoral History for Waverley-Fall River-Beaver Bank" (PDF). nslegislature.ca. Nova Scotia, Chief Electoral Officer (2013). 39th Provincial General Election, October 8, 2013: Volume 1 – Statement of Votes & Statistics (PDF) (Report). Elections Nova Scotia. Archived from the original (PDF) on 10 April 2018.

=== 2009 ===
2009 Nova Scotia general election
Party	Candidate	Votes	%	±%
New Democratic	Percy Paris	5,007	54.47	8.08
Liberal	Bill Horne	2,290	24.91	13.76
Progressive Conservative	Gary Hines	1,696	18.45	-21.72
Green	Damon Loomer	199	2.16	-0.12
Total		9,192	–	
Source(s) Source: Nova Scotia Legislature (2024). "Electoral History for Waverley-Fall River-Beaver Bank" (PDF). nslegislature.ca.

=== 2006 ===
2006 Nova Scotia general election
Party	Candidate	Votes	%	±%
New Democratic	Percy Paris	3,782	46.39	13.08
Progressive Conservative	Gary Hines	3,275	40.17	2.51
Liberal	Thomas Deal	909	11.15	-15.71
Green	William Lang	186	2.28	–
Total		8,152	–	
Source(s) Source: Nova Scotia Legislature (2024). "Electoral History for Waverley-Fall River-Beaver Bank" (PDF). nslegislature.ca.

=== 2003 ===
2003 Nova Scotia general election
Party	Candidate	Votes	%	±%
Progressive Conservative	Gary Hines	3,141	37.67	–
New Democratic	Percy Paris	2,778	33.31	–
Liberal	David E. Merrigan	2,240	26.86	–
Nova Scotia Party	Heather Sawyers	94	1.13	–
Marijuana	Alex Neron	86	1.03	–
Total		8,339	–	
Source(s) Source: Nova Scotia Legislature (2024). "Electoral History for Waverley-Fall River-Beaver Bank" (PDF). nslegislature.ca.

== See also ==
- List of Nova Scotia provincial electoral districts
- Canadian provincial electoral districts
