= Keith Colwell =

Canadian politician

The Honourable Keith Colwell ECNS
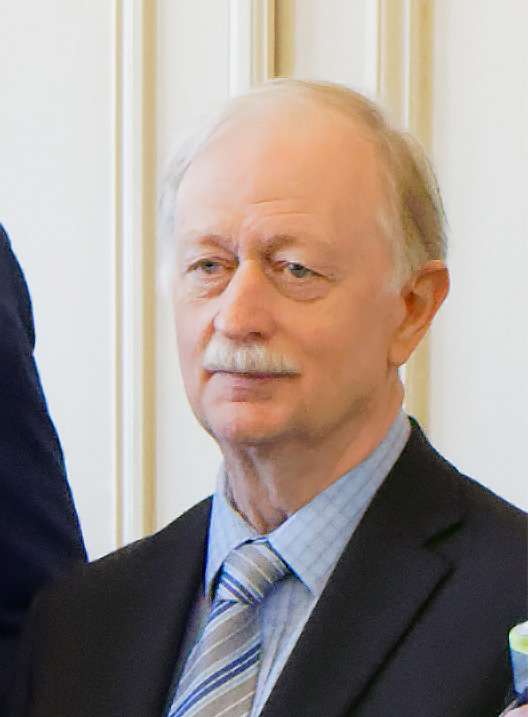
- Keith Colwell

Member of the Nova Scotia House of Assembly for Preston-Dartmouth Preston (2003-2013)
- In office August 5, 2003 – July 17, 2021
- Preceded by: David Hendsbee
- Succeeded by: riding redistributed

Member of the Nova Scotia House of Assembly for Eastern Shore
- In office May 25, 1993 – July 27, 1999
- Preceded by: Riding Established
- Succeeded by: Bill Dooks

Personal details
- Born: October 3, 1947 (age 78) Jemseg, New Brunswick
- Party: Liberal

Keith Wayne Colwell (born October 3, 1947) is a Canadian politician, who served as a member of the Nova Scotia House of Assembly, representing the riding of Preston-Dartmouth for the Nova Scotia Liberal Party, from 1993 to 1999 and from 2003 to 2021.

== Early life ==
Colwell was raised in Jemseg, New Brunswick. Since the 1990s, he has owned and operated a manufacturing company and was one of the founding members of the Enterprise Forum for Nova Scotia.

== Political career ==
Colwell successfully ran for the Liberal nomination in the riding of Eastern Shore in spring 1993. He was elected in the 1993 provincial election and was re-elected in the 1998 provincial election. Following his re-election, Colwell was appointed to the Executive Council of Nova Scotia where he served as Minister for Fisheries and Aquaculture, Minister of Consumer Services, as well as holding other cabinet responsibilities.

Colwell was defeated in the 1999 provincial election by Bill Dooks. Turning to municipal politics, Colwell was elected to Halifax Regional Council on October 30, 1999, in a by-election for the Halifax Regional Municipality where he represented District 3 (Preston/Porters Lake). Colwell was re-elected in District 3 in the 2000 municipal general election.

Colwell successfully ran for the Liberal nomination in the riding of Preston and was elected in the 2003 provincial election. He was re-elected in the 2006 and 2009 provincial elections. The riding name was changed in 2013 to Preston-Dartmouth and he was re-elected in the 2013 provincial election.

Colwell was honoured for his efforts in successfully banning the burning of tires in Nova Scotia and has been a volunteer fireman with 13 years of experience.

In May 2013, Colwell was allegedly the victim of an assault by Percy Paris, a fellow member of the Legislative Assembly of Nova Scotia. "Yesterday in the house of assembly, I was assaulted and threatened by the minister of economic and rural development and tourism," Colwell said in a statement. "This improper behaviour by the minister was quite clearly an execution of a threat and intimidation, an attempt to prevent me from performing my function as a legislator, elected representative for my constituents and member of this assembly." Paris was charged with assault and uttering threats.

On October 22, 2013, Colwell was appointed to the Executive Council of Nova Scotia where he serves as Minister of Fisheries and Aquaculture, Minister of Agriculture, Minister responsible for Part II of the Gaming Control Act, as well as Minister responsible for the Maritime Provinces Harness Racing Commission Act.

== Personal life ==
He and his wife Elizabeth currently live in Porters Lake.

== Electoral record ==
2013 Nova Scotia general election
Party	Candidate	Votes	%	±%
Liberal	Keith Colwell	3,326	58.39	
New Democratic Party	André Cain	1,816	31.88	
Progressive Conservative	Andrew J. Mecke	554	9.73	

2009 Nova Scotia general election
Party	Candidate	Votes	%	±%
Liberal	Keith Colwell	1908	42.20	
New Democratic Party	Janet Sutcliffe	1316	29.11	
Progressive Conservative	Dwayne Provo	1240	27.43	
Green	Sarah Densmore	57	1.26	–

2006 Nova Scotia general election
Party	Candidate	Votes	%	±%
Liberal	Keith Colwell	1853	42.13	
Progressive Conservative	Dwayne Provo	1610	36.83	
New Democratic Party	Douglas Sparks	843	19.17	
Green	David Farrell	82	1.86	–

2003 Nova Scotia general election
Party	Candidate	Votes	%	±%
Liberal	Keith Colwell	1411	33.90	
Progressive Conservative	David Hensbee	1361	32.92	
New Democratic Party	Douglas Sparks	1331	31.97	
Marijuana	Marc-Boris St-Maurice	50	1.21	

1999 Nova Scotia general election
Party	Candidate	Votes	%	±%
Progressive Conservative	Bill Dooks	3637		
Liberal	Keith Colwell	2695		
New Democratic Party	Mary-Alice Tzagarakis	1970		
Nova Scotia Party	Jack Friis	388		

1993 Nova Scotia general election
Party	Candidate	Votes	%	±%
Liberal	Keith Colwell	3,760		
Progressive Conservative	Tom McInnes	3,523		
New Democratic Party	Gary Moore	1,369		
