= Nova Scotians United =

- Defunct provincial party
- Abbreviation: NSU
- Leader: Leigh Baker
- President: Alan Nightingale
- Deputy leader: Emily Clarke-Haughn
- Founded: December 16, 2021
- Dissolved: December 12, 2024
- Ideology: Right-wing populism
- Colours: Blue and yellow
- Seats in House of Assembly: 0 / 55

Website
- Official website

Nova Scotians United (NSU) is a defunct political party in the province of Nova Scotia, Canada.

== History ==
Nova Scotians United started as an anti-protocol group that protested against COVID-19 restrictions.

The party registered with Elections Nova Scotia on December 16, 2021.

During the Canada convoy protest in February 2022, the party was involved with protests in Halifax where party leader Leigh Baker spoke at a rally.

Bobby Taylor was nominated in the 2023 Preston provincial by-election, which served as the first political test for the party. He received 95 votes in the by-election, or 2.20% of the popular vote.

The party did not run any candidates in 2024 election. However, two independent candidates, James Omand (Hants West) and Stemer MacLeod (Victoria-The Lakes) used Nova Scotians United auditors in their campaigns.

The party was deregistered on December 12, 2024 after failing to run candidates in the election.

== Party platform ==
The party focuses on reducing taxes, allowing private healthcare, choice in education, and opposition to COVID-19 protocols.

The party has the following statement on the platform page of their website:

We are building a selfless movement that thinks only about the heart of our province which is the people who live here and our land, Mi'kma'ki. We believe many of the major issues we face in healthcare, housing, education, human trafficking, etc. are because of unending complacency and corruption.

== Election results ==
Results as independent candidates

Party affiliated candidates who ran as independents in the 2024 election because Nova Scotians United did not run any candidates.

General election	Riding	Candidate	Votes	%	Place
2024	Hants West	James Omand	93	1.15	4/4
2024	Victoria-The Lakes	Stemer MacLeod	104	1.85	5/5

=== By-elections ===
By-election	Date	Candidate	Votes	%	Place
Preston	August 8, 2023	Bobby Taylor	95	2.20	5/5
