= Kevin Deveaux =

Canadian politician

MLA for Cole Harbour-Eastern Passage
- In office 1998–2007
- Preceded by: Dennis Richards
- Succeeded by: Becky Kent

Personal details
- Born: September 24, 1966 (age 59) Halifax, Nova Scotia
- Party: NDP
- Occupation: Lawyer

Kevin Eugene Deveaux (born September 24, 1966) is a Canadian lawyer and an international expert on parliaments and political parties who worked for the United Nations as the senior global adviser on parliaments and their development from 2008-2012. He served as the Member of the Legislative Assembly (MLA) for the constituency of Cole Harbour-Eastern Passage in the Nova Scotia House of Assembly. He was first elected in 1998 and was re-elected in 1999, 2003 and 2006. He has also worked for a number of other development organizations in promoting good governance, transparent and accountable parliaments and effective political parties.

== Early life ==
Deveaux was born in Halifax, Nova Scotia. The youngest of five children, he attended school in Eastern Passage, Nova Scotia and Cole Harbour, Nova Scotia, graduating from Cole Harbour District High School in 1984. His Father, Eugene "Jeep" Deveaux was the municipal councillor for the community for 24 years, from 1972 to 1996.

From 1984 to 1986, Deveaux attended St. Mary's University, studying for a Bachelor of Commerce. Prior to finishing his degree, he was accepted at Osgoode Hall Law School and graduated from York University in 1989. Among other noted professors, Deveaux was taught by Louise Arbour.

== Career ==
=== Law ===
In 1989, after completing law school, Deveaux articled with the Ontario Ministry of the Attorney General at the Ministry of Labour Legal Services Branch, between 1989 and 1990 and continued to work at that location until 1992. As a Crown Attorney for the Ontario Ministry of Labour he prosecuted corporations that violated the Occupational Health and Safety Act. He also represented workers before administrative tribunals commissioned under the Employment Standards Act.

In 1992, Deveaux returned to Nova Scotia where he worked first with the City of Halifax, and then with the Nova Scotia Department of Justice as a Crown Attorney. From 1993 to 1996, he worked with the Nova Scotia Department of Labour as a Legislation and Policy Review Officer. In that position, he worked with labour and management in drafting the new Occupational Health and Safety Act.

In 1995, Deveaux was selected to work with the United Nations International Labour Organization in China. He worked in Beijing with the Chinese Government, employers and unions to draft workplace protection legislation. From 1996 until his election in 1998, Deveaux worked with the Nova Scotia Workers' Adviser Program, representing injured workers.

=== Politics ===
In 1998, Deveaux was one of 19 Nova Scotia New Democratic Party (NDP) MLAs elected to the Nova Scotia House of Assembly in the first minority parliament in the history of Nova Scotia. During his second term, Deveaux was appointed Deputy Speaker in the House of Assembly.

In 2000, Deveaux was a candidate in the 2000 Nova Scotia New Democratic Party leadership election to succeed outgoing party leader Robert Chisholm. He placed a close second behind Helen MacDonald.

Deveaux was re-elected in 2003 during the second minority government in Nova Scotia history. He was appointed House Leader for the Official Opposition. During this term Deveaux was the author of the significant amendments to the Nova Scotia Labour Standards Code, ensuring the passage of expanded vacation benefits, access to overtime pay, and the establishment of sick leave. In addition, the amendments adopted a minimum wage review committee that has subsequently resulted in a minimum wage within Nova Scotia that has increased significantly. In 2004 he also worked closely with MLAs from other parties to advocate for the passage of the French-language Services Act, providing for the first time a guarantee of access to provincial services for francophone Nova Scotians.

In 2006, Deveaux was re-elected for the fourth time and continued his role as House Leader for the Official Opposition. Among other legislative initiatives, Deveaux was an advocate for the community safety, directly resulting in the passage of the Safer Communities and Neighbourhoods Act by the Conservative Government of the day.

During his terms in office, Deveaux was the NDP critic (shadow minister) for Justice, Acadian Affairs, Education, Finance and the Treasury and Policy Board.

=== Parliamentary Development ===
In 2001 Deveaux began his first assignment in the field of international democratic governance. Between 2001 and 2006 he worked for the National Democratic Institute for International Affairs (NDI) offices in Kosovo, Cambodia, Egypt and Iraq. There he drafted parliamentary rules of procedure and legislation, including the Kosovo Access to Information Act, and provided consultations and advice to MPs and senior government officials. He was Head of Mission for elections observations in Palestine in 2005.

On January 24, 2007, Deveaux announced he was resigning his position as an NDP MLA to accept an appoint with the United Nations in Vietnam as the Senior Technical Adviser to the National Assembly of Vietnam.

In August 2008, Deveaux was appointed Parliamentary Development Policy Adviser to the United Nations Development Programme based in New York City. He was responsible for the Global Programme for Parliamentary Strengthening (GPPS), a project that provided support to parliaments in Africa and the Arab states. In addition, Deveaux provided technical advice to the more than 70 parliaments in countries where UNDP has projects with those national parliaments, including the parliaments of Guyana, Bangladesh, Pakistan, Bhutan, Cambodia and Turkmenistan.

In 2011, since the Arab Spring, Deveaux worked extensively in the Arab region in support of the development of political parties, constituent assembly and parliaments in Tunisia, Egypt, Libya, Jordan, Lebanon and Iraq. This work resulted in the development of a multimillion-dollar programme in support of parliaments and political parties in the Arab Region, funded by the Government of Belgium.

In 2012 Deveaux was one of the first international experts to assess the Assembly of the Union - the Parliament of Myanmar - meeting with the leaders of all the major parties in the parliament and recommending significant interventions in support of the institution.

Deveaux was also instrumental in the creation of social media portals which promote parliamentary development and the political empowerment of women - namely, Agora, a web portal developed by UNDP, NDI, the World Bank, the European Commission and the International Institute for Democracy and Electoral Assistance (International IDEA); and the International Knowledge Network of Women in Politics (iKNOW Politics) website, which promotes the participation of women in the political process.

In September 2012 Deveaux completed his assignment with the United Nations Development Programme and created Deveaux International Governance (DIG) Consultants Inc., a firm focusing on the provision of technical advice to parliaments, political parties and organizations that work with these political institutions globally.

Since the firm was created, Deveaux has worked with the World Bank, International IDEA, UN Women, UNDP, the European Union, USAID, the Swiss Agency for Development Cooperation and other organizations. From 2013-15 Deveaux was part of team contracted by DFID to conduct a series of evaluations of the Westminster Foundation for Democracy.

Deveaux has worked directly with more than 80 parliaments and MPs from more than 115 countries. He has formulated more than 20 parliamentary development projects including in Serbia, Tanzania, Tunisia, Uzbekistan, and South Sudan. He has provided technical assistance to numerous parliaments, with more recent work including Malaysia, Georgia and Lebanon. In particular he has been engaged since 2013 in re-establishing the Parliament of Fiji, including the writing of the Standing Orders and other relevant legislation and support to the Law, Justice and Human Rights Committee. Through UNDP he has also been engaged in Nepal since 2016, supporting the establishment of seven provincial assemblies after the country adopted a federal political system in 2015.

In addition to his work with parliaments, Deveaux has provided technical assistance to political parties in a number of countries including parties in the Western Balkans, Pacific Island States and Southern Africa. He has also authored a number of practical guides and handbooks for parliamentarians on topics such as renewable energy, the Sustainable Development Goals (SDGs), Climate Finance, Commonwealth Parliamentary Association Benchmarks Self-Assessment Toolkit and the operation of constituency offices.

Deveaux has also conducted independent evaluations of UN global programmes and policy centres. This has included reviews of the global anti-corruption programmes (GAIN; ACPIS) and two UNDP global policy centres in Oslo and Singapore. In 2018 he was the Team Leader for the constitutionally mandated Second Autonomy Review for the Governments of Papua New Guinea and Bougainville. In 2019 he was asked by both governments to mediate the calculation of the Restoration and Development Grant to be paid to Bougainville annually.

Deveaux and his wife live in Eastern Passage. They have two children.

== Election results ==
2006 Nova Scotia general election: Cole Harbour-Eastern Passage
Party	Candidate	Votes	%
New Democratic	Kevin Deveaux	4086	64.4
Progressive Conservative	Don McIver	1201	18.93
Liberal	Brian Churchill	903	14.23
Green	Beverley Woodfield	155	2.44

2003 Nova Scotia general election
Party	Candidate	Votes	%	±%
New Democratic Party	Kevin Deveaux	3,997	58.44	+19.17
Progressive Conservative	Harry McInroy	1,641	23.99	-13.36
Liberal	Brian Churchill	1,121	16.39	-6.99
Nova Scotia Party	Kailee A. McPherson	80	1.17	

1999 Nova Scotia general election
Party	Candidate	Votes	%	±%
New Democratic Party	Kevin Deveaux	3,721	39.27	-
Progressive Conservative	Nadune Cooper Mont	3,539	37.35	-
Liberal	Colin MacEachern	2,216	23.38	-

1998 Nova Scotia general election
Party	Candidate	Votes	%	±%
New Democratic Party	Kevin Deveaux	4,411	45.73	-
Progressive Conservative	Randy Anstey	3,303	34.24	-
Liberal	Linda DeGrace	1,931	20.02	-
