= North Preston =

North Preston Up Home, New Road Settlement
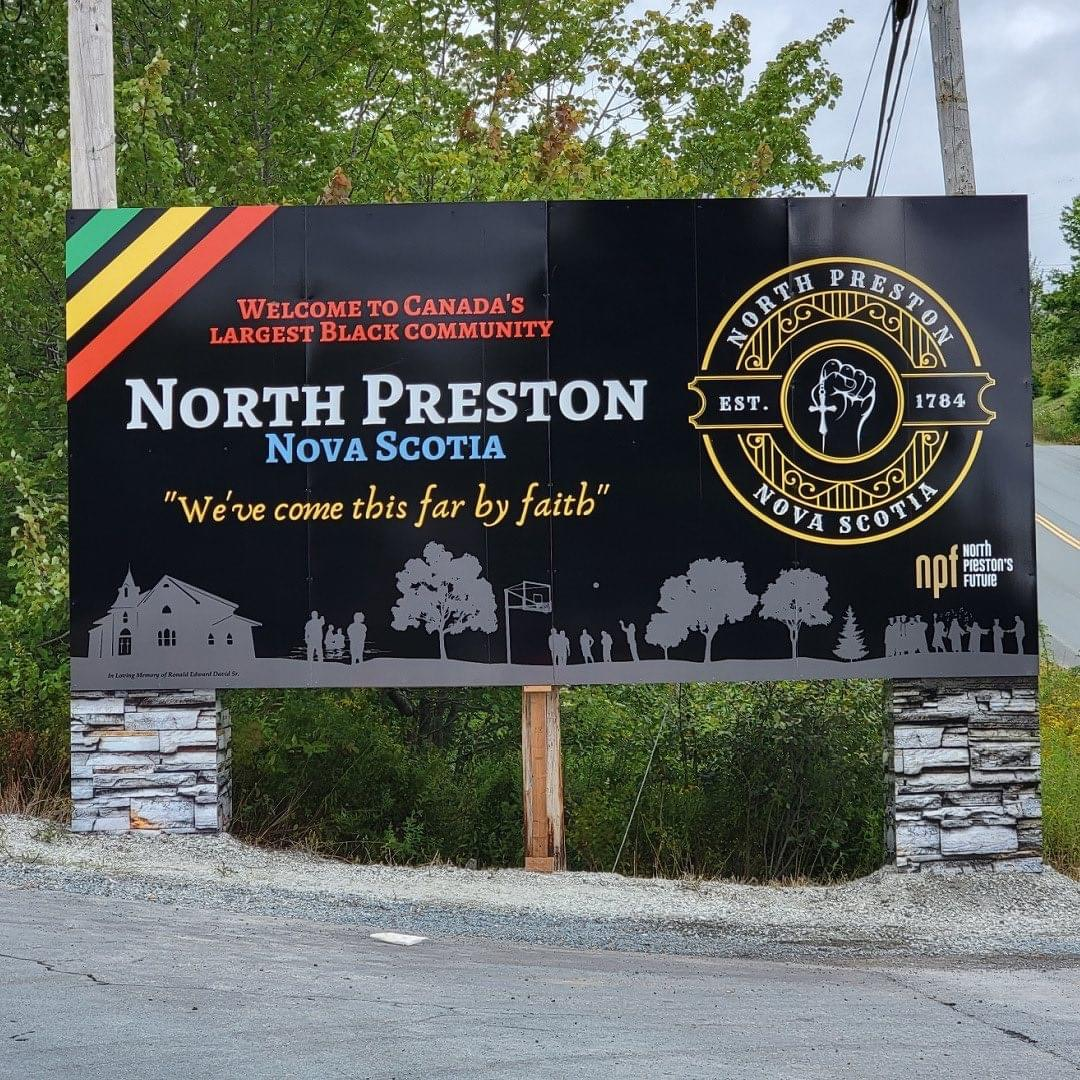
- Entrance to North Preston

- Location within Canada Location within Nova Scotia
- Coordinates: 44°44′46″N 63°27′52″W
- Country: Canada
- Province: Nova Scotia
- Municipality: Halifax Regional Municipality
- Time zone: UTC−4 (AST)
  - Summer (DST): UTC−3 (ADT)
- GNBC Code: CBRDX

North Preston is a community located in Nova Scotia, Canada within the Halifax Regional Municipality.

The community is populated primarily by Black Nova Scotians. North Preston is the largest Black community in Nova Scotia by population, and has the highest concentration of African Canadians in Canada.

== History ==
Historical populations
Year	Pop.	±%
1921	572	—
1931	741	+29.5%
1956	885	+19.4%
1981	1,240	+40.1%
1986	1,230	−0.8%
1996	1,135	−7.7%
2001	950	−16.3%
2006	847	−10.8%
2011	868	+2.5%
2016	903	+4.0%
Source: Statistics Canada (Note: Statistics Canada and City of Halifax planning data)

The community traces its origins from several waves of migration in the 18th and 19th centuries. The American Revolution brought Black Loyalists to the Preston area. The 1790s brought a different group of Black settlers to the regions, the Maroons from Jamaica. While many Maroons later left for Sierra Leone, a number stayed in Preston and Guysborough County. These groups were joined shortly after by a third migration starting in 1813, of Black refugees from the War of 1812. The Black Refugees came to Nova Scotia mostly from the Southern US states, bringing with them a strong Baptist tradition. These three major waves of migrants were also periodically joined by runaway slaves. In recent times, lifelong residents have been joined by small numbers of migrants from Ontario, the Caribbean, Africa, and the United States – many of whom are married into families in North Preston.

In 1842, the First Preston Church was organized for the area. In 1854, the African Baptist Association was organized by Richard Preston and Septimus Clarke to band together the Baptist churches across Nova Scotia, whose members were primarily black. A second church was organized in North Preston in 1856. This second church was called the “South Church” until 1879, when the congregation erected a new building. The church was renamed St. Thomas Church after their first pastor, John R. Thomas.

William Brown Sr. and William Arnold purchased land on the southern shore of Bedford Basin in the City of Halifax. In 1846, people migrated out of Preston (and Hammonds Plains) and began settling in the area, which gradually became known as Africville.

In 2014, a multi-purpose community centre designed to serve 5,000 residents was opened on Simmonds Road. An RCMP detachment was built adjoining the community centre, and serves North Preston, East Preston, Cherry Brook and Lake Loon. A $300,000 olympic-sized basketball court was constructed next to the community centre in 2019, as a result of the fundraising efforts of North Preston resident Shaquille Smith.

== Present day ==
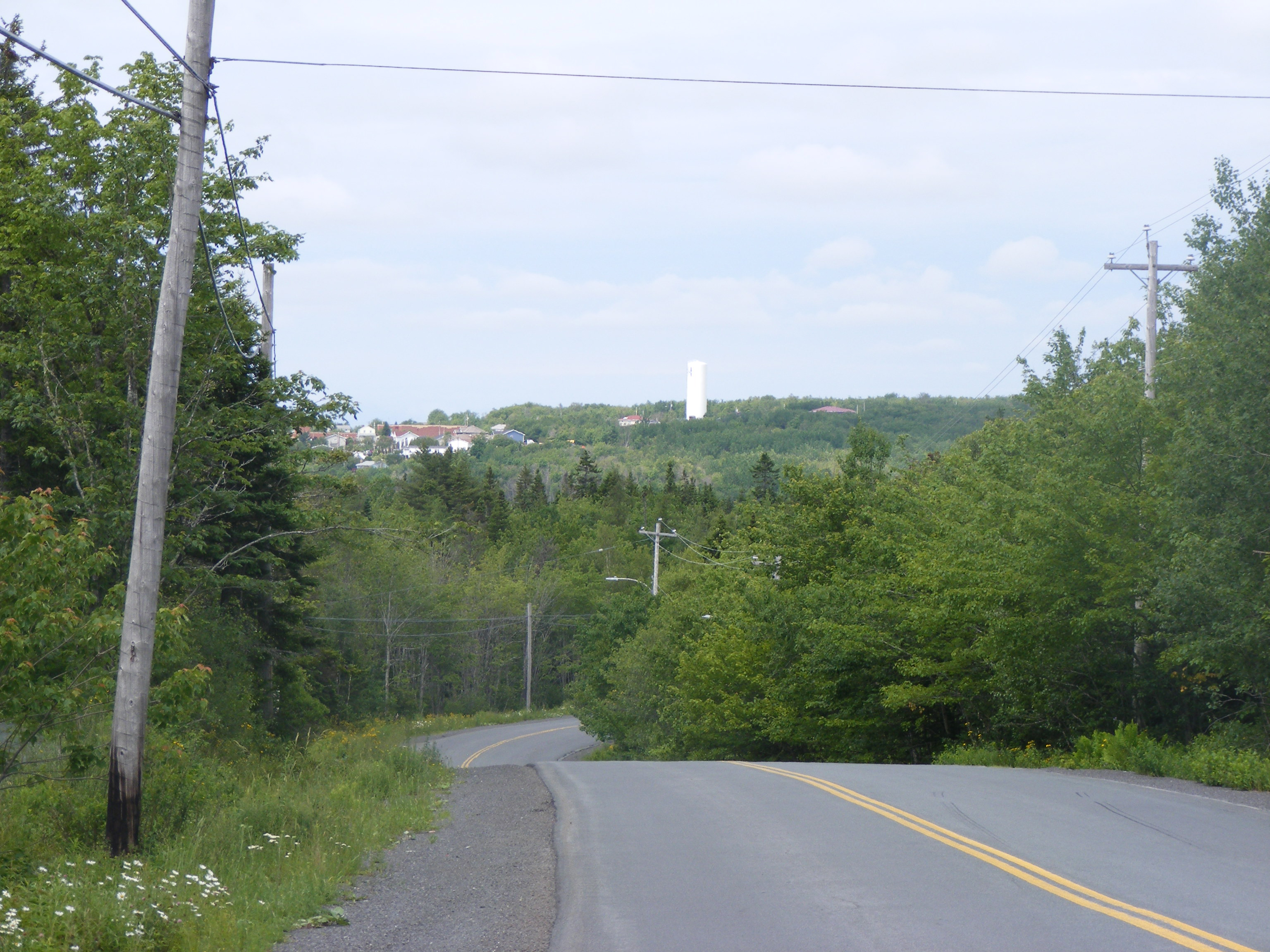
The road to North Preston. The settlement's water tower can be seen.

North Preston has a high home-ownership rate and a stable population, and has resisted gentrification through urban sprawl which has occurred in other Black Nova Scotian settlements. At $33,233, North Preston has a higher average income compared with the average of $31,795 for Nova Scotia. The community remains relatively isolated from the rest of Halifax, in its rural setting.

North Preston Day is an annual community festival and parade occurring each July 4. Many members of the community attend; the event is free and guests from outside of the community attend.

North Preston is served by Nelson Whynder Elementary School. A number of community buildings, a day care, a medical centre, a volunteer fire department and several local businesses are located in North Preston. Saint Thomas United Baptist Church forms the spiritual heart of the community.

There is some discrepancy about how many residents live in the community. The population estimates range from a low of 805 by the area's city Councillor, to a high of 4,100 by The Globe and Mail.

== Notable people ==
- Kirk Johnson, boxer
- Custio Clayton, six-time Canadian amateur champion boxer
- Dwayne Provo, athlete and politician
- Lindell Wigginton, basketball player
- Keonte Beals, singer and author
- Evangeline Cain-Grant, North Preston's First Lawyer.

== Representation in popular culture ==
- The 2008 children's picture book, Up Home, written by Shauntay Grant depicts places and people in the community.
- In 2010, television personality Debbie Travis visited the community on North Preston Day to film an episode for her show All for One on CBC.
- The 2015 Director X directed film, Across the Line, is largely filmed in North Preston. It is loosely based around the events surrounding the 1989 Cole Harbour District High School race riots.
- The legal drama television series Diggstown centres around North Preston, where the show's main character Marcie Diggs is from. The first season premiered on CBC Television on March 6, 2019.
