= 33rd General Assembly of Nova Scotia =

The 33rd General Assembly of Nova Scotia represented Nova Scotia between 1901 and 1906.

The Liberal Party led by George Henry Murray formed the government.

Thomas Robertson was chosen as speaker in 1902. Frederick Andrew Laurence was speaker from 1903 to 1904. Edward Matthew Farrell was named speaker in 1905.

The assembly was dissolved on May 22, 1906.

== List of Members ==
Electoral District	Name	Party	First elected / previously elected
Annapolis County	J. W. Longley	Liberal	1882
Annapolis County	Joseph A. Bancroft	Liberal	1894
Annapolis County	Orlando Daniels (1906)	Liberal	1906
Antigonish County	Angus McGillivray	Liberal	1878, 1887, 1895
Antigonish County	Christopher P. Chisholm	Liberal	1891
Antigonish County	Fred Robert Trotter (1903)	Liberal	1903
County of Cape Breton	Neil J. Gillis	Liberal	1900
County of Cape Breton	D.D. McKenzie	Liberal	1900
County of Cape Breton	Arthur Samuel Kendall (1904)	Liberal	1897, 1904
Colchester County	Frederick Andrew Laurence	Liberal	1886
Colchester County	B.F. Pearson	Liberal	1901
Colchester County	Henry T. Laurence (1904)	Liberal	1904
Cumberland County	Thomas R. Black	Liberal	1884, 1894
Cumberland County	Daniel McLeod	Liberal-Conservative	1901
Cumberland County	Elisha B. Paul (1904)	Liberal	1904
Digby County	Ambrose H. Comeau	Liberal	1890
Digby County	Angus M. Gidney	Liberal	1895
Guysborough County	John H. Sinclair	Liberal	1894
Guysborough County	William Whitman	Liberal	1901
Guysborough County	James F. Ellis (1904)	Liberal	1904
Halifax County	M.E. Keefe	Liberal	1900
Halifax County	David McPherson	Liberal	1897
Halifax County	George Mitchell	Liberal	1897
Hants County	Arthur Drysdale	Liberal	1891
Hants County	F.H. McHeffey	Liberal	1901
Inverness County	Moses J. Doucet	Liberal	1897
Inverness County	James McDonald	Liberal	1897
Kings County	Harry H. Wickwire	Liberal	1894
Kings County	Brenton H. Dodge	Liberal	1894
Lunenburg County	E.D. Davison	Liberal	1901
Lunenburg County	Alexander K. MacLean	Liberal	1901
Lunenburg County	John Drew Sperry (1902)	Liberal	1889, 1897, 1902
Lunenburg County	Charles U. Mader (1904)	Liberal	1904
Pictou County	E.M. MacDonald	Liberal	1897
Pictou County	George Patterson	Liberal	1901
Pictou County	Charles Elliott Tanner	Liberal-Conservative	1894, 1900
Pictou County	Robert M. McGregor (1904)	Liberal	1904
Queens County	Edward M. Farrell	Liberal	1896
Queens County	Charles F. Cooper	Liberal	1901
Richmond County	Duncan Finlayson	Liberal	1897
Richmond County	Simon Joyce	Liberal	1894
Richmond County	Charles P. Bissett (1904)	Liberal	1904
Shelburne County	Thomas Johnston	Liberal	1867, 1882
Shelburne County	Thomas Robertson	Liberal	1894
Shelburne County	Moses H. Nickerson (1902)	Liberal	1902
Shelburne County	George A. Cox (1904)	Liberal	1904
Victoria County	George Henry Murray	Liberal	1896
Victoria County	John G. Morrison	Liberal	1894
Yarmouth County	Augustus F. Stoneman	Liberal	1900
Yarmouth County	Henry S. LeBlanc	Liberal	1897
Yarmouth County	George P. Sanderson (1904)	Liberal	1904

== Notes ==
Preceded by 32nd General Assembly of Nova Scotia	General Assemblies of Nova Scotia; 1901–1906	Succeeded by 34th General Assembly of Nova Scotia
