= 1906 Nova Scotia general election =

Canadian provincial election

- June 20, 1906

38 seats of the Nova Scotia House of Assembly 20 seats needed for a majority
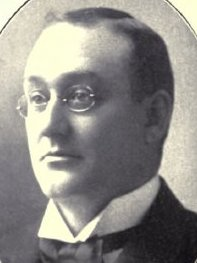

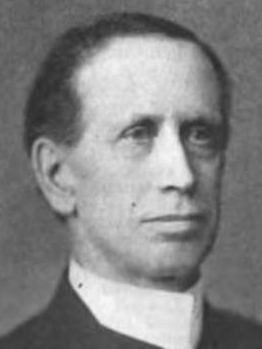
	First party	Second party
Leader	George Henry Murray	Charles Elliott Tanner
Party	Liberal	Liberal-Conservative
Leader since	1896	1901
Leader's seat	Victoria	Pictou
Last election	36	2
Seats won	32	5
Seat change	▼4	▲3
Popular vote	87,267	67,028
Percentage	55.08%	42.32%
Swing	▼3.71pp	▲1.11pp
Premier before election
George Henry Murray
Liberal
Premier after election
George Henry Murray
Liberal

The 1906 Nova Scotia general election was held on 20 June 1906 to elect members of the 34th House of Assembly of the province of Nova Scotia, Canada. It was won by the Liberal party.

== Results ==
=== Results by party ===
↓
32	5	1
Liberal	Liberal-Conservative	Other

Official results
Party	Party leader	# of candidates	Seats				Popular vote		
Party	Party leader	# of candidates	1901	Dissolution	Elected	Change	#	%	Change (pp)
Liberal	George Henry Murray	40	36	36	32	-4	87,267	55.08%	-3.71%
Liberal-Conservative	Charles Elliott Tanner	32	2	2	5	+3	67,028	42.32%	+1.11%
Independent/Other		2	0	0	1	+1	4,125	2.60%	+2.36%
Vacant				0					
Total valid votes							158,420	100.00%	–
Blank and invalid ballots							0	0.00%	–
Total		74	38	38	38	–	158,420	100.00%	–

Popular vote
Liberal	55.09%
Liberal-Conservative	42.32%
Independent/Other	2.60%

Seats summary
Liberal	84.21%
Liberal-Conservative	13.16%
Independent/Other	2.63%

== Retiring incumbents ==
Liberal

- George A. Cox, Shelburne
- Michael Edwin Keefe, Halifax
- Henry T. Laurence, Colchester
- George Mitchell, Halifax
- George G. Sanderson, Yarmouth
- John Drew Sperry, Lunenburg

== Nominated candidates ==
1906 Nova Scotia Provincial Election

Legend
bold denotes party leader
† denotes an incumbent who is not running for re-election or was defeated in nomination contest

=== Valley ===
Electoral district	Candidates			Incumbent
Electoral district	Liberal	Liberal-Conservative	Independent/Other	Incumbent
Annapolis	Orlando Daniels; 2,062; 29.46%	A. L. Davison; 1,674; 23.91%		Orlando Daniels
Annapolis	Joseph A. Bancroft; 1,826; 26.09%	Alfred Wightman; 1,438; 20.54%		Joseph A. Bancroft
Digby	Ambroise-Hilaire Comeau; 1,376; 32.51%	M. H. Marshall; 829; 19.59%		Ambroise-Hilaire Comeau
Digby	Angus Morrison Gidney; 1,253; 29.61%	A. A. Theriault; 774; 18.29%		Angus Morrison Gidney
Hants	Arthur Drysdale; 1,934; 26.19%	E. A. O'Brien; 1,800; 24.37%		Arthur Drysdale
Hants	Francis Parker McHeffey; 1,792; 24.27%	Charles Smith Wilcox; 1,859; 25.17%		Francis Parker McHeffey
Kings	Brenton Dodge; 2,152; 25.83%		E. W. Sawyer; 1,977; 23.72% (Union Reform)	Brenton Dodge
Kings	Harry H. Wickwire; 2,056; 24.67%		Charles Alexander Campbell; 2,148; 25.78% (Union Reform)	Harry H. Wickwire

=== South Shore ===
Electoral district	Candidates			Incumbent
Electoral district	Liberal	Liberal-Conservative	Independent/Other	Incumbent
Lunenburg	Charles Uniacke Mader; 2,274; 26.12%	C. S. Marshall; 2,147; 24.66%		Charles Uniacke Mader
Lunenburg	Henry March; 2,254; 25.89%	C. A. Lander; 2,031; 23.33%		John Drew Sperry†
Queens	Edward Matthew Farrell; 1,008; 31.28%	J. S. Hughes; 754; 23.40%		Edward Matthew Farrell
Queens	Charles F. Cooper; 874; 27.13%	J. C. Pyke; 586; 18.19%		Charles F. Cooper
Shelburne	Moses H. Nickerson; 1,083; 28.08%	N. R. Craig; 930; 24.11%		Moses H. Nickerson
Shelburne	Robert Irwin; 975; 25.28%	T. C. Lockwood; 869; 22.53%		George A. Cox†
Yarmouth	Ernest Howard Armstrong; 1,586; 34.20%	A. M. Perrin; 815; 17.57%		George G. Sanderson†
Yarmouth	Henry S. LeBlanc; 1,425; 30.72%	Raymond Neri d'Entremont; 812; 17.51%		Henry S. LeBlanc

=== Fundy-Northeast ===
Electoral district	Candidates			Incumbent
Electoral district	Liberal	Liberal-Conservative	Independent/Other	Incumbent
Colchester	William Davison Hill; 2,567; 28.76%	J. H. McCleave; 2,177; 24.39%		Henry T. Laurence†
Colchester	Benjamin Franklin Pearson; 2,386; 26.73%	John Suckling; 1,795; 20.11%		Benjamin Franklin Pearson
Cumberland	Elisha B. Paul; 3,619; 26.57%	C. F. Jameison; 2,995; 21.99%		Elisha B. Paul
Cumberland	William Thomas Pipes; 3,587; 26.34%	Daniel J. McLeod; 3,419; 25.10%		Daniel J. McLeod

=== Halifax ===
Electoral district	Candidates			Incumbent
Electoral district	Liberal	Liberal-Conservative	Independent/Other	Incumbent
Halifax	David McPherson; 5,550; 19.23%	G.M. Campbell; 4,423; 15.33%		David McPherson
Halifax	George Everett Faulkner; 5,475; 18.97%	W.M. Sedgewick; 4,093; 14.18%		George Mitchell†
Halifax	Robert Emmett Finn; 5,372; 18.62%	W.F. O'Connor; 3,943; 13.66%		Michael Edwin Keefe†

=== Central Nova ===
Electoral district	Candidates			Incumbent
Electoral district	Liberal	Liberal-Conservative	Independent/Other	Incumbent
Antigonish	Fred Robert Trotter; Acclamation			Fred Robert Trotter
Antigonish	Christopher P. Chisholm; Acclamation			Christopher P. Chisholm
Guysborough	James F. Ellis; 1,705; 29.30%	Simon Osborn Giffin; 1,325; 22.77%		James F. Ellis
Guysborough	William Whitman; 1,634; 28.08%	G.A.R. Rowlings; 1,155; 19.85%		William Whitman
Pictou	Robert M. McGregor; 3,832; 17.50%	George E. Munro; 3,372; 15.40%		Robert M. McGregor
Pictou	George Patterson; 3,546; 16.19%	John M. Baillie; 3,617; 16.52%		George Patterson
Pictou	Robert Hugh MacKay; 3,546; 16.19%	**Charles Elliott Tanner**; 3,983; 18.19%		Charles Elliott Tanner

=== Cape Breton ===
Electoral district	Candidates			Incumbent
Electoral district	Liberal	Liberal-Conservative	Independent/Other	Incumbent
Cape Breton	Arthur Samuel Kendall; 5,225; 26.66%	J. W. Madden; 4,777; 24.37%		Arthur Samuel Kendall
Cape Breton	Neil J. Gillis; 4,897; 24.98%	Robert Hamilton Butts; 4,702; 23.99%		Neil J. Gillis
Inverness	James MacDonald; 2,052; 22.26%	Daniel McNeil; 1,099; 11.92%		James MacDonald
Inverness	H. C. Hache; 1,540; 16.70%	Daniel McNeil; 1,099; 11.92%		James MacDonald
Inverness	Moses J. Doucet; 1,530; 16.59%	Charles Edward McMillan; 1,639; 17.78%		Moses J. Doucet
Inverness	Dougald MacLachan; 1,360; 14.75%	Charles Edward McMillan; 1,639; 17.78%		Moses J. Doucet
Richmond	Charles P. Bissett; 1,140; 36.66%	Edward Doyle; 398; 12.80%		Charles P. Bissett
Richmond	Simon Joyce; 766; 24.63%	Felix Landry; 806; 25.92%		Simon Joyce
Victoria	**George Henry Murray**; Acclamation			George Henry Murray
Victoria	John Gillis Morrison; Acclamation			John Gillis Morrison
