= 32nd General Assembly of Nova Scotia =

The 32nd General Assembly of Nova Scotia represented Nova Scotia between 1897 and 1901.

The Liberal Party led by George Henry Murray formed the government.

Frederick A. Lawrence was chosen as speaker for the house.

The assembly was dissolved on September 3, 1901.

== List of Members ==
Electoral District	Name	Party	First elected / previously elected
Annapolis County	Joseph A. Bancroft	Liberal	1894
Annapolis County	J. W. Longley	Liberal	1882
Antigonish County	Christopher P. Chisholm	Independent	1891 (Note: First elected as Liberal)
Antigonish County	Angus McGillivray	Liberal	1878, 1887, 1895
County of Cape Breton	Alexander Johnston	Liberal	1897
County of Cape Breton	Arthur S. Kendall (Note: elected to federal seat)	Liberal	1897
County of Cape Breton	Neil J. Gillis (1900)	Liberal	1900
County of Cape Breton	A. Daniel McKenzie (1900)	Liberal	1900
Colchester County	Frederick Andrew Laurence	Liberal	1886
Colchester County	Thomas G. McMullen	Liberal-Conservative	1897
Cumberland County	Thomas R. Black	Liberal	1884, 1894
Cumberland County	Alexander E. Fraser	Liberal	1894
Digby County	Ambrose H. Comeau	Liberal	1890
Digby County	Angus M. Gidney	Liberal	1895
Guysborough County	William Akins Fergusson	Liberal	1897
Guysborough County	John H. Sinclair	Liberal	1894
Halifax County	David McPherson	Liberal	1897
Halifax County	George Mitchell	Liberal	1897
Halifax County	William H. Wallace	Liberal	1896
Halifax County	Michael Edwin Keefe (1900)	Liberal	1900
Hants County	Arthur Drysdale	Liberal	1891
Hants County	Charles Smith Wilcox	Liberal-Conservative	1894
Inverness County	Moses J. Doucet	Liberal	1897
Inverness County	James McDonald	Liberal	1897
Kings County	Brenton H. Dodge	Liberal	1894
Kings County	Harry H. Wickwire	Liberal	1894
Lunenburg County	Charles E. Church	Liberal	1882
Lunenburg County	John D. Sperry	Liberal	1889, 1897
Pictou County	M.H. Fitzpatrick	Liberal-Conservative	1897
Pictou County	E.M. MacDonald	Liberal	1897
Pictou County	J.D. McGregor	Liberal	1890, 1897
Pictou County	Charles Elliott Tanner	Liberal-Conservative	1894, 1900
Queens County	Edward M. Farrell	Liberal	1896
Queens County	Thomas Keillor	Liberal	1897
Richmond County	Duncan Finlayson	Liberal	1897
Richmond County	Simon Joyce	Liberal	1894
Shelburne County	Thomas Johnston	Liberal	1867, 1882
Shelburne County	Thomas Robertson	Liberal	1894
Victoria County	George Henry Murray	Liberal	1896
Victoria County	John G. Morrison	Liberal	1894
Yarmouth County	William Law (Note: named to Legislative Council)	Liberal	1886
Yarmouth County	Henry S. LeBlanc	Liberal	1897
Yarmouth County	Augustus F. Stoneman (1900)	Liberal	1900

== Notes ==
Preceded by 31st General Assembly of Nova Scotia	General Assemblies of Nova Scotia; 1897–1901	Succeeded by 33rd General Assembly of Nova Scotia
