= 47th General Assembly of Nova Scotia =

- Majority parliament
- Feb. 8, 1961 – Aug. 29, 1963

Parliament leaders
- Premier: Robert Stanfield; November 20, 1956
- Leader of the Opposition: Earl Wallace Urquhart; February 8, 1961 – October 8, 1963

Party caucuses
- Government: Progressive Conservative Party
- Opposition: Liberal Party
- Crossbench: Co-operative Commonwealth Federation

House of Assembly
- Speaker of the House: Harvey Veniot; February 8, 1961
- Members: 43 MLA seats

Sovereign
- Monarch: Elizabeth II; February 6, 1952
- Lieutenant governor: Edward Chester Plow; January 15, 1958 – March 1, 1963
- Henry Poole MacKeen; March 1, 1963

Sessions
- 1st session February 8, 1961 – March 24, 1961
- 2nd session February 28, 1962 – April 13, 1962
- 3rd session February 20, 1963 – August 29, 1963
← 46th	→ 48th

The 47th General Assembly of Nova Scotia represented Nova Scotia between February 8, 1961 and August 29, 1963.

== Division of seats ==
There were 43 members of the General Assembly, elected in the 1960 Nova Scotia general election.

Leader	Party	# of Seats
Henry D. Hicks	Liberal	15
Robert L. Stanfield	Progressive Conservative	27
Michael James MacDonald	CCF	1
Total		43

== List of members ==
Riding	Name	Party	First elected / previously elected	Position
Annapolis East	Hanson Dowell	Progressive Conservative	1960	
Annapolis West	Peter Murray Nicholson	Liberal	1956	
Antigonish	William F. MacKinnon	Progressive Conservative	1956	
Cape Breton South	Donald C. McNeil	Progressive Conservative	1956	
Cape Breton Centre	Michael MacDonald	CCF	1945	
Cape Breton Centre	Michael MacDonald	New Democratic Party	1945	
Cape Breton North	Tom McKeough	Progressive Conservative	1960	
Cape Breton Nova	Percy Gaum	Progressive Conservative	1956	
Cape Breton East	Layton Fergusson	Progressive Conservative	1956	
Cape Breton West	Edward Manson	Progressive Conservative	1956	
Clare	Pierre E. Belliveau	Liberal	1953	
Colchester	Robert L. Stanfield	Progressive Conservative	1949	Premier
Colchester	G. I. Smith	Progressive Conservative	1949	
Cumberland East	James A. Langille	Progressive Conservative	1953	
Cumberland West	Allison T. Smith	Liberal	1953	
Cumberland Centre	Stephen T. Pyke	Progressive Conservative	1953	Minister of Highways
Digby	Victor Cardoza	Liberal	1953, 1960	
Guysborough	Alex "Tando" MacIsaac	Progressive Conservative	1960	
Halifax South	Richard A.Donahoe	Progressive Conservative	1954	
Halifax Centre	Donald M. Smith	Progressive Conservative	1960	
Halifax North	John E. Ahern	Liberal	1956	
Halifax Northwest	Gordon H. Fitzgerald	Progressive Conservative	1960	
Halifax East	Duncan MacMillan	Liberal	1956	
Halifax West	Charles H. Reardon	Liberal	1956	
Halifax County Dartmouth	Gordon L. S. Hart	Liberal	1960	
Hants East	Ernest M. Ettinger	Progressive Conservative	1949, 1956	
Hants East	Albert J. Ettinger (1962)	Progressive Conservative	1962	
Hants West	George H. Wilson	Progressive Conservative	1950	
Inverness	Joseph Clyde Nunn	Liberal	1954	
Inverness	Roderick MacLean	Liberal	1949	
Inverness	William N. MacLean (1962)	Liberal	1962	
Kings North	Gladys M. Porter	Progressive Conservative	1960	
Kings South	Edward Haliburton	Progressive Conservative	1953	
Kings West	Edward D. MacArthur	Liberal	1960	
Lunenburg Centre	George O. Lohnes	Progressive Conservative	1956	
Lunenburg East	Maurice L. Zinck	Progressive Conservative	1959	
Lunenburg West	Harley J. Spence	Progressive Conservative	1953	
Pictou East	John W. MacDonald	Liberal	1949, 1960	
Pictou West	Harvey Veniot	Progressive Conservative	1956	speaker
Pictou Centre	Donald R. MacLeod	Progressive Conservative	1956	
Queens	W. S. Kennedy Jones	Progressive Conservative	1953	
Richmond	Earl Wallace Urquhart	Liberal	1949	
Shelburne	James M. Harding	Progressive Conservative	1956	
Victoria	Carleton L. MacMillan	Liberal	1949	
Yarmouth	Willard C. O'Brien	Liberal	1956	
Yarmouth	George A. Burridge	Progressive Conservative	1960	

== Former members of the 47th General Assembly ==
Name	Party	Electoral District	Cause of departure	Succeeded by	Elected
Ernest M. Ettinger	Progressive Conservative	Hants East	death	Albert J. Ettinger, PC	September 11, 1962
Roderick MacLean	Liberal	Inverness	death	William N. MacLean, Liberal	September 11, 1962

Preceded by 46th General Assembly of Nova Scotia	General Assemblies of Nova Scotia; 1960–1963	Succeeded by 48th General Assembly of Nova Scotia
