= 48th General Assembly of Nova Scotia =

- Majority parliament
- 6 February 1964 – 20 April 1967

Parliament leaders
- Premier: Robert Stanfield; November 20, 1956
- Leader of the Opposition: Peter M. Nicholson; February 6, 1964 – May 30, 1967

Party caucuses
- Government: Progressive Conservative Party
- Opposition: Liberal Party

House of Assembly
- Speaker of the House: Harvey Veniot; February 8, 1961
- Members: 43 MLA seats

Sovereign
- Monarch: Elizabeth II; February 6, 1952
- Lieutenant Governor: Henry Poole MacKeen; March 1, 1963

Sessions
- 1st session February 6, 1964 – March 18, 1964
- 2nd session February 10, 1965 – March 30, 1965
- 3rd session February 16, 1966 – April 6, 1966
- 4th session September 9, 1966 – December 2, 1966
- 5th session February 9, 1967 – April 20, 1967
← 47th	→ 49th

The 48th General Assembly of Nova Scotia represented Nova Scotia between February 6, 1964 and April 20, 1967.

== Division of seats ==
There were 43 members of the General Assembly, elected in the 1963 Nova Scotia general election.

Leader	Party	# of Seats
Earl Wallace Urquhart	Liberal	4
Robert L. Stanfield	Progressive Conservative	39
Total		43

== List of members ==
Riding	Name	Party	First elected / previously elected	Position
Annapolis East	John I. Marshall	Progressive Conservative	1963	
Annapolis West	Peter Murray Nicholson	Liberal	1956	
Antigonish	William F. MacKinnon	Progressive Conservative	1956	
Cape Breton South	Donald C. McNeil	Progressive Conservative	1956	
Cape Breton Centre	Mike Laffin	Progressive Conservative	1963	
Cape Breton North	Tom McKeough	Progressive Conservative	1960	
Cape Breton Nova	Percy Gaum	Progressive Conservative	1956	
Cape Breton East	Layton Fergusson	Progressive Conservative	1956	
Cape Breton West	Edward Manson	Progressive Conservative	1956	
Clare	Hector J. Pothier	Progressive Conservative	1963	
Colchester	Robert L. Stanfield	Progressive Conservative	1949	Premier
Colchester	G. I. Smith	Progressive Conservative	1949	
Cumberland East	James A. Langille	Progressive Conservative	1953	
Cumberland West	D. L. George Henley	Progressive Conservative	1963	
Cumberland Centre	Stephen T. Pyke	Progressive Conservative	1953	Minister of Highways
Digby	Robert Baden Powell	Progressive Conservative	1963	
Guysborough	Alex "Tando" MacIsaac	Progressive Conservative	1960	
Halifax South	Richard A. Donahoe	Progressive Conservative	1954	
Halifax Centre	Donald M. Smith	Progressive Conservative	1960	
Halifax North	James H. Vaughan	Progressive Conservative	1963	
Halifax Northwest	G. H. Fitzgerald	Progressive Conservative	1960	
Halifax East	Nelson Gaetz	Progressive Conservative	1963	
Halifax West	D. C. McNeil	Progressive Conservative	1963	
Halifax County Dartmouth	Irvin William Akerley	Progressive Conservative	1963	
Hants East	Albert J. Ettinger	Progressive Conservative	1962	
Hants West	Norman T. Spence	Progressive Conservative	1963	
Inverness	Norman J. MacLean	Progressive Conservative	1963	
Inverness	William N. MacLean	Liberal	1962	
Kings North	Gladys M. Porter	Progressive Conservative	1960	
Kings South	Edward Haliburton	Progressive Conservative	1953	
Kings West	Paul Kinsman	Progressive Conservative	1963	
Lunenburg Centre	George O. Lohnes	Progressive Conservative	1956	
Lunenburg East	Maurice L. Zinck	Progressive Conservative	1959	
Lunenburg West	Harley J. Spence	Progressive Conservative	1953	
Pictou East	A. Lloyd MacDonald	Liberal	1963	
Pictou West	Harvey Veniot	Progressive Conservative	1956	speaker
Pictou Centre	Donald R. MacLeod	Progressive Conservative	1956	
Queens	W. S. Kennedy Jones	Progressive Conservative	1953	
Richmond	Gerald Doucet	Progressive Conservative	1963	
Shelburne	James M. Harding	Progressive Conservative	1956	
Victoria	Carleton L. MacMillan	Liberal	1949	
Yarmouth	George A. Snow	Progressive Conservative	1963	
Yarmouth	George A. Burridge	Progressive Conservative	1960	

Preceded by 47th General Assembly of Nova Scotia	General Assemblies of Nova Scotia; 1963–1967	Succeeded by 49th General Assembly of Nova Scotia
