= 1963 Nova Scotia general election =

Canadian provincial election

- October 8, 1963

43 seats of the Nova Scotia House of Assembly 22 seats needed for a majority
- Turnout: 77.87% ▼4.15pp
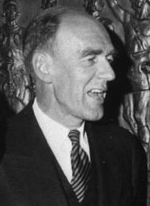
	First party	Second party	Third party
		Lib	NDP
Leader	Robert Stanfield	Earl Wallace Urquhart	James H. Aitchison
Party	Progressive Conservative	Liberal	New Democratic
Leader since	November 10, 1948	November 3, 1962	1963
Leader's seat	Colchester	Richmond (Lost re-election)	Did not run
Last election	27	15	1
Seats won	39	4	0
Seat change	▲12	▼11	▼1
Popular vote	191,128	134,873	14,076
Percentage	55.87%	39.43%	4.11%
Swing	▲7.76pp	▼2.93pp	▼4.78pp
Premier before election
Robert Stanfield
Progressive Conservative
Premier after election
Robert Stanfield
Progressive Conservative

The 1963 Nova Scotia general election was held on 8 October 1963 to elect members of the 48th House of Assembly of the province of Nova Scotia, Canada. It was won by the Progressive Conservatives.

== Results ==
=== Results by party ===
↓
39	4
Progressive Conservative	Liberal

Official results
Party	Party leader	# of candidates	Seats				Popular vote		
Party	Party leader	# of candidates	1960	Dissolution	Elected	Change	#	%	Change (pp)
Progressive Conservative	Robert Stanfield	43	27	26	39	+12	191,128	55.87%	+7.76%
Liberal	Earl Wallace Urquhart	43	15	15	4	-11	134,873	39.43%	-2.93%
New Democratic	James H. Aitchison	20	1	1	0	-1	14,076	4.11%	-4.78%
Vacant				1					
Total valid votes							340,077	99.42%	-0.12%
Blank and invalid ballots							1,997	0.58%	+0.12%
Total		106	43	43	43	–	342,074	100.00%	–
Registered voters / turnout							400,078	77.87%	-4.15%

Popular vote
PC	55.87%
Liberal	39.43%
New Democratic	4.11%

Seats summary
PC	90.70%
Liberal	9.30%

== Retiring incumbents ==
Liberal

- Pierre E. Belliveau, Clare
- John W. MacDonald, Pictou East

Progressive Conservative

- George Henry Wilson, Hants West

== Nominated candidates ==
Legend
bold denotes party leader
† denotes an incumbent who is not running for re-election or was defeated in nomination contest

=== Valley ===
Electoral district	Candidates			Incumbent
Electoral district	PC	Liberal	NDP	Incumbent
Annapolis East	John I. Marshall; 2,962; 56.40%	Melbourne Parker Armstrong; 2,232; 42.50%	Murray Alton Bent; 58; 1.10%	Vacant
Annapolis West	Kenneth E. Green; 2,075; 45.81%	Peter M. Nicholson; 2,386; 52.67%	Dale A. Young; 69; 1.52%	Peter M. Nicholson
Clare	Hector J. Pothier; 2,154; 52.61%	Joseph C. LeBlanc; 1,940; 47.39%		Pierre E. Belliveau†
Digby	Robert Baden Powell; 2,671; 52.23%	Victor Cardoza; 2,378; 46.50%	Louis A. Beeler; 65; 1.27%	Victor Cardoza
Hants West	Norman T. Spence; 4,193; 58.20%	W. Whitney Spicer; 2,840; 39.42%	Arthur Benedict; 171; 2.37%	George Henry Wilson†
Kings North	Gladys Porter; 3,668; 59.43%	David Durell Sutton; 2,405; 38.97%	George Turner; 99; 1.60%	Gladys Porter
Kings South	Edward Haliburton; 2,505; 65.27%	Bruce M. Trenholm; 1,333; 34.73%		Edward Haliburton
Kings West	Paul Kinsman; 3,879; 55.85%	Edward D. MacArthur; 3,067; 44.15%		Edward D. MacArthur

=== South Shore ===
Electoral district	Candidates			Incumbent
Electoral district	PC	Liberal	NDP	Incumbent
Lunenburg Centre	George O. Lohnes; 4,785; 57.06%	Leon J. Iverson; 3,601; 42.94%		George O. Lohnes
Lunenburg East	Maurice L. Zinck; 2,267; 63.17%	Charles E. Harris; 1,322; 36.83%		Maurice L. Zinck
Lunenburg West	Harley J. Spence; 2,937; 58.12%	Joye F. Davison; 2,116; 41.88%		Harley J. Spence
Queens	W. S. Kennedy Jones; 3,833; 65.85%	W. Alton Snow; 1,988; 34.15%		W. S. Kennedy Jones
Shelburne	James McKay Harding; 3,737; 54.40%	Robert Quinlan Hood; 3,133; 45.60%		James McKay Harding
Yarmouth	George A. Burridge; 4,884; 25.20%	Irving Charles Pink; 4,345; 22.42%	Angus Boyd MacGillivary; 358; 1.85%	George A. Burridge
Yarmouth	George A. Snow; 5,077; 26.19%	Willard O'Brien; 4,719; 24.35%		Willard O'Brien

=== Fundy-Northeast ===
Electoral district	Candidates			Incumbent
Electoral district	PC	Liberal	NDP	Incumbent
Colchester	**Robert Stanfield**; 9,606; 32.42%	Gordon T. Purdy; 5,515; 18.61%	Harvey T. Curtis; 382; 1.29%	Robert Stanfield
Colchester	George Isaac Smith; 9,147; 30.87%	Charles K. Sutherland; 4,746; 16.02%	Helen K. Wright; 233; 0.79%	George Isaac Smith
Cumberland Centre	Stephen T. Pyke; 2,545; 66.68%	William Thomas Noiles; 1,272; 33.32%		Stephen T. Pyke
Cumberland East	James A. Langille; 5,226; 63.10%	Norman Willard Noonan; 2,795; 33.75%	Lloyd L. Ayer; 261; 3.15%	James A. Langille
Cumberland West	D. L. George Henley; 2,516; 54.04%	Allison T. Smith; 2,140; 45.96%		Allison T. Smith
Hants East	Albert J. Ettinger; 2,739; 52.86%	George E. Fraser; 2,356; 45.47%	Ralph Loomer; 87; 1.68%	Albert J. Ettinger

=== Halifax/Dartmouth/Eastern Shore ===
Electoral district	Candidates			Incumbent
Electoral district	PC	Liberal	NDP	Incumbent
Halifax Centre	Donald MacKeen Smith; 5,478; 58.57%	Gordon S. Cowan; 3,875; 41.43%		Donald MacKeen Smith
Halifax County-Dartmouth	Irvin William Akerley; 9,884; 52.88%	Gordon L. S. Hart; 8,150; 43.60%	Edward B. Doyle; 657; 3.52%	Gordon L. S. Hart
Halifax East	Nelson Gaetz; 3,061; 52.62%	Duncan MacMillan; 2,756; 47.38%		Duncan MacMillan
Halifax North	James H. Vaughan; 8,602; 52.43%	John E. Ahern; 7,360; 44.86%	Peggy Prowse; 444; 2.71%	John E. Ahern
Halifax Northwest	Gordon H. Fitzgerald; 5,559; 56.07%	George Douglas Burris; 4,027; 40.62%	Gerald A. Guptill; 329; 3.32%	Gordon H. Fitzgerald
Halifax South	Richard Donahoe; 5,986; 63.23%	Merlin Nunn; 3,183; 33.62%	Gordon A. Smith; 298; 3.15%	Richard Donahoe
Halifax West	D. C. McNeil; 8,792; 57.00%	Charles H. Reardon; 6,126; 39.72%	Harold J. Martell; 506; 3.28%	Charles H. Reardon

=== Central Nova ===
Electoral district	Candidates			Incumbent
Electoral district	PC	Liberal	NDP	Incumbent
Antigonish	William F. MacKinnon; 3,334; 54.58%	Ronald Saint John Chisholm; 2,774; 45.42%		William F. MacKinnon
Guysborough	Alexander MacIsaac; 3,229; 52.86%	Thomas Edwin Kirk; 2,880; 47.14%		Alexander MacIsaac
Pictou Centre	Donald R. MacLeod; 5,752; 60.21%	Thomas H. Frazer; 3,801; 39.79%		Donald R. MacLeod
Pictou East	John Andrew McLean; 2,649; 49.90%	A. Lloyd MacDonald; 2,660; 50.10%		John W. MacDonald†
Pictou West	Harvey Veniot; 2,999; 59.54%	Charles Ernest MacCarthy; 2,038; 40.46%		Harvey Veniot

=== Cape Breton ===
Electoral district	Candidates			Incumbent
Electoral district	PC	Liberal	NDP	Incumbent
Cape Breton Centre	Mike Laffin; 3,699; 54.12%	Joseph Flaudio Rizzetto; 939; 13.74%	Michael James MacDonald; 2,197; 32.14%	Michael James MacDonald
Cape Breton East	Layton Fergusson; 5,870; 58.06%	Bernard Currie; 1,359; 13.44%	John L. MacKinnon; 2,881; 28.50%	Layton Fergusson
Cape Breton North	Tom MacKeough; 6,200; 58.71%	Murray J. Ryan; 2,961; 28.04%	John Dolhanty; 1,399; 13.25%	Tom MacKeough
Cape Breton Nova	Percy Gaum; 3,344; 53.37%	Charles Richard Sigut; 1,213; 19.36%	Albert Ollie Wilson; 1,709; 27.27%	Percy Gaum
Cape Breton South	Donald C. MacNeil; 5,283; 49.21%	John F. MacIntosh; 3,579; 33.34%	Edward Johnston; 1,873; 17.45%	Donald C. MacNeil
Cape Breton West	Edward Manson; 4,941; 56.30%	Allan Sullivan; 3,835; 43.70%		Edward Manson
Inverness	Norman J. MacLean; 4,474; 26.78%	Joseph Clyde Nunn; 3,988; 23.87%		Joseph Clyde Nunn
Inverness	Alfred J. Davis; 4,026; 24.10%	William N. MacLean; 4,219; 25.25%		William N. MacLean
Richmond	Gerald Doucet; 2,670; 50.79%	**Earl Wallace Urquhart**; 2,587; 49.21%		Earl Wallace Urquhart
Victoria	Fisher Hudson; 1,890; 49.42%	Carleton L. MacMillan; 1,934; 50.58%		Carleton L. MacMillan
