= 1956 Nova Scotia general election =

Canadian provincial election

- October 30, 1956

43 seats of the Nova Scotia House of Assembly 22 seats needed for a majority
- Turnout: 79.83% ▲4.04pp
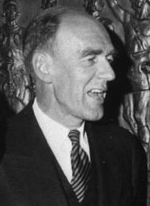
	First party	Second party	Third party
		Lib	CCF
Leader	Robert Stanfield	Henry Hicks	Michael James MacDonald
Party	Progressive Conservative	Liberal	Co-operative Commonwealth
Leader since	November 10, 1948	September 9, 1954	1953
Leader's seat	Colchester	Annapolis ran in Annapolis East (won)	Cape Breton Centre
Last election	12	23	2
Seats won	24	18	1
Seat change	▲12	▼5	▼1
Popular vote	162,678	159,666	9,878
Percentage	48.55%	47.65%	2.95%
Swing	▲5.37pp	▼1.27pp	▼3.87pp
Premier before election
Henry Hicks
Liberal
Premier after election
Robert Stanfield
Progressive Conservative

The 1956 Nova Scotia general election was held on 30 October 1956 to elect members of the 46th House of Assembly of the province of Nova Scotia, Canada. It was won by the Progressive Conservatives led by Robert Stanfield.

This was the first election the Liberals had fought after the death of their longtime charismatic leader, Angus L. Macdonald. Public Health Minister Harold Connolly became interim leader and premier following Macdonald's death in 1954, but was defeated at a leadership convention by Education Minister Henry Hicks. The convention exposed a sharp religious divide in the Liberal Party; Hicks was a Protestant and Connolly was a Catholic. Hicks was unable to heal the breach, and the Liberals were narrowly defeated, ending 23 years of Liberal rule.

== Results ==
=== Results by party ===
↓
24	18	1
Progressive Conservative	Liberal	CCF

Official results
Party	Party leader	# of candidates	Seats				Popular vote		
Party	Party leader	# of candidates	1953	Dissolution	Elected	Change	#	%	Change (pp)
Progressive Conservative	Robert Stanfield	43	12	13	24	+12	160,966	48.58%	+5.19%
Liberal	Henry Hicks	43	23	19	18	-5	159,656	48.18%	-0.98%
Co-operative Commonwealth	Michael James MacDonald	11	2	2	1	-1	9,832	3.00%	-3.85%
Independent		1	0	0	0	0	812	0.25%	-0.35%
Vacant				3					
Total valid votes							331,396	99.39%	-0.13%
Blank and invalid ballots							2,032	0.61%	+0.13%
Total		98	37	37	43	+6	333,428	100.00%	–
Registered voters / turnout							367,474	79.83%	+4.04%

Popular vote
PC	48.58%
Liberal	48.18%
CCF	3.00%
Independent	0.25%

Seats summary
PC	55.81%
Liberal	41.86%
CCF	2.33%

== Retiring incumbents ==
Liberal

- Arthur W. MacKenzie, Guysborough
- James Edward Rutledge, Halifax Centre

== Nominated candidates ==
Legend
bold denotes party leader
† denotes an incumbent who is not running for re-election or was defeated in nomination contest

=== Valley ===
Electoral district	Candidates				Incumbent
Electoral district	Liberal	PC	CCF	Independent	Incumbent
Annapolis East	**Henry Hicks**; 2,830; 54.68%	Harry L. Ritcey; 2,277; 43.99%	Murray Alton Bent; 69; 1.33%		Henry Hicks; Annapolis
Annapolis West	Peter M. Nicholson; 2,523; 53.84%	Leigh Minard Marshall; 2,163; 46.16%			New riding
Clare	Pierre E. Belliveau; 2,046; 52.60%	J. Fred Gaudet; 1,844; 47.40%			Pierre E. Belliveau
Digby	Victor Cardoza; 2,559; 48.65%	Malcolm Stewart Leonard; 2,701; 51.35%			Victor Cardoza
Hants West	Gerald Regan; 3,300; 47.69%	George Henry Wilson; 3,405; 49.21%	Ralph Loomer; 214; 3.09%		George Henry Wilson
Kings North	Eric Balcom; 3,054; 50.37%	George Arthur Boggs; 3,009; 49.63%			George Arthur Boggs; Kings
Kings South	MacIntosh MacLeod; 1,594; 40.23%	Edward Haliburton; 2,368; 59.77%			Edward Haliburton; Kings
Kings West	C.D. McLean; 2,985; 49.97%	Hiram Thomas; 2,988; 50.03%			New riding

=== South Shore ===
Electoral district	Candidates				Incumbent
Electoral district	Liberal	PC	CCF	Independent	Incumbent
Lunenburg Centre	Harold Uhlman; 3,843; 49.03%	George O. Lohnes; 3,995; 50.97%			New riding
Lunenburg East	Kirk S. Hennigar; 1,579; 45.56%	R. Clifford Levy; 1,887; 54.44%			R. Clifford Levy; Lunenburg
Lunenburg West	Frederick E.L. Fowke; 2,500; 49.34%	Harley J. Spence; 2,567; 50.66%			Harley J. Spence; Lunenburg
Queens	Merrill D. Rawding; 2,974; 49.23%	W. S. Kennedy Jones; 3,067; 50.77%			W. S. Kennedy Jones
Shelburne	Wilfred Dauphinee; 3,086; 48.05%	James McKay Harding; 3,337; 51.95%			Wilfred Dauphinee
Yarmouth	Eric Spinney; 4,876; 26.68%	William Heartz Brown; 4,007; 21.93%			William Heartz Brown
Yarmouth	Willard O'Brien; 5,438; 29.76%	Raymond Z. Bourque; 3,953; 21.63%			Raymond Z. Bourque

=== Fundy-Northeast ===
Electoral district	Candidates				Incumbent
Electoral district	Liberal	PC	CCF	Independent	Incumbent
Colchester	Hector Hill; 6,733; 22.13%	**Robert Stanfield**; 8,476; 27.86%	Arnold Lynds; 251; 0.83%		Robert Stanfield
Colchester	Margaret Norrie; 6,664; 21.91%	George Isaac Smith; 8,057; 26.48%	William Wright; 240; 0.79%		George Isaac Smith
Cumberland Centre	Ralph F. Gilroy; 1,803; 39.70%	Stephen T. Pyke; 2,738; 60.30%			Stephen T. Pyke
Cumberland East	Walter Tremaine Purdy; 4,303; 49.41%	James A. Langille; 4,406; 50.59%			James A. Langille
Cumberland West	Allison T. Smith; 2,618; 54.82%	William Harmon Wasson; 2,158; 45.18%			Allison T. Smith
Hants East	Arthur W. MacKenzie; 2,342; 48.91%	Ernest M. Ettinger; 2,392; 49.96%	Malcolm F. Wheadon; 130; 1.13%		Vacant

=== Halifax/Dartmouth/Eastern Shore ===
Electoral district	Candidates				Incumbent
Electoral district	Liberal	PC	CCF	Independent	Incumbent
Halifax Centre	Gordon S. Cowan; 5,642; 52.91%	David Milsom; 5,022; 47.09%			James Edward Rutledge†
Halifax County-Dartmouth	Geoffrey W. Stevens; 7,276; 49.69%	C.J. Creighton; 6,811; 46.51%	Gerald Yetman; 557; 3.80%		New riding
Halifax East	Duncan MacMillan; 3,015; 57.84%	Reid Denton Sangster; 2,198; 42.16%			Geoffrey W. Stevens
Halifax North	John E. Ahern; 8,773; 53.10%	John A. O'Malley; 7,748; 46.90%			Vacant
Halifax Northwest	Ronald Manning Fielding; 3,763; 50.40%	S.E. Haverstock; 3,573; 47.86%	L.C. Wilson; 130; 1.74%		New riding
Halifax South	Edward F. Cragg; 5,171; 46.08%	Richard Donahoe; 6,051; 53.92%			Richard Donahoe
Halifax West	Charles H. Reardon; 6,119; 51.02%	William J. Dalton; 5,875; 48.98%			Ronald Manning Fielding

=== Central Nova ===
Electoral district	Candidates				Incumbent
Electoral district	Liberal	PC	CCF	Independent	Incumbent
Antigonish	Colin H. Chisholm; 2,669; 48.06%	William F. MacKinnon; 2,884; 51.94%			Colin H. Chisholm
Guysborough	Alexander W. Cameron; 3,177; 51.34%	R.S. Kaiser; 3,011; 48.66%			Arthur W. MacKenzie†
Pictou Centre	A.T. Logan; 5,303; 48.46%	Donald R. MacLeod; 5,639; 51.54%			Vacant
Pictou East	John W. MacDonald; 2,749; 49.95%	William A. MacLeod; 2,754; 50.05%			John W. MacDonald
Pictou West	Stewart W. Proudfoot; 2,556; 49.15%	Harvey Veniot; 2,644; 50.85%			Stewart W. Proudfoot

=== Cape Breton ===
Electoral district	Candidates				Incumbent
Electoral district	Liberal	PC	CCF	Independent	Incumbent
Cape Breton Centre	James P. McNeil; 2,569; 37.75%	Charles P. Miller; 1,289; 18.94%	**Michael James MacDonald**; 2,948; 43.31%		Michael James MacDonald
Cape Breton East	C. Roy MacDonald; 3,058; 29.85%	Layton Fergusson; 4,324; 42.20%	Russell Cunningham; 2,864; 27.95%		Russell Cunningham
Cape Breton North	Alexander O'Handley; 4,465; 42.31%	John Michael Macdonald; 6,088; 57.69%			Alexander O'Handley
Cape Breton Nova	Gus Brown; 1,682; 25.68%	Percy Gaum; 2,582; 39.41%	John A. Chisholm; 1,475; 22.52%	Charles O'Connell; 812; 12.40%	New riding
Cape Breton South	John Smith MacIvor; 4,450; 41.66%	Donald C. MacNeil; 5,101; 47.76%	Albert Martin; 1,130; 10.58%		John Smith MacIvor
Cape Breton West	Malcolm A. Patterson; 4,104; 48.03%	Edward Manson; 4,440; 51.97%			Malcolm A. Patterson
Inverness	Joseph Clyde Nunn; 4,415; 27.80%	Archie Neil Chisholm; 3,673; 23.13%			Joseph Clyde Nunn
Inverness	Roderick MacLean; 4,252; 26.78%	A.L. Davis; 3,539; 22.29%			Roderick MacLean
Richmond	Earl Wallace Urquhart; 2,636; 53.82%	William C. Boudreau; 2,262; 46.18%			Earl Wallace Urquhart
Victoria	Carleton L. MacMillan; 2,162; 56.08%	Leonard Walter Jones; 1,693; 43.92%			Carleton L. MacMillan
