= Hugh Tinkham =

Canadian politician

MLA for Yarmouth County (1974-1981) Argyle (1981-1984)
- Preceded by: George A. Snow
- Succeeded by: Neil LeBlanc

Personal details
- Born: April 8, 1946 (age 80) Yarmouth, Nova Scotia
- Party: Liberal
- Occupation: Real estate agent, businessman

George Hugh Tinkham (born April 8, 1946) is a Canadian politician. He represented the electoral districts of Yarmouth County, and Argyle in the Nova Scotia House of Assembly from 1974 to 1984. He was a member of the Nova Scotia Liberal Party.

== Career ==
Born in 1946 at Yarmouth, Nova Scotia, Tinkham entered provincial politics in the 1974 election, winning the dual-member Yarmouth County riding with fellow Liberal Fraser Mooney. He was re-elected along with Mooney in the 1978 election. In the 1981 election, Tinkham was re-elected in the new Argyle riding. He did not seek re-election in 1984. Following his political career, Tinkham worked as a real estate agent.
