= Mike Keith =

Mike Keith may refer to:

- Mike Keith (sportscaster), American sports announcer, University of Tennessee Tennessee Volunteers
- Mike Keith (mathematician) (born 1955), American mathematician and writer

== See also ==
- Michael Keith (disambiguation)
- Michael Edwin Keefe (1844–1933), building contractor and political figure in Nova Scotia, Canada
- Michael O'Keefe (disambiguation)
