= René W.E. Landry =

Canadian politician (1876–1949)

René Landry

MLA for Yarmouth County
- In office 1928–1933
- Preceded by: Raymond Neri d'Entremont
- Succeeded by: Only returned one member after

Personal details
- Born: April 30, 1876 Ste. Anne du Ruisseau, Nova Scotia
- Died: August 22, 1949 (aged 73) Yarmouth, Nova Scotia
- Party: Liberal
- Spouse: Winnifred
- Occupation: politician

René Wilfrid-Émilien Landry (April 30, 1876 – August 22, 1949) was a Canadian political figure in Nova Scotia, representing Yarmouth County in the Nova Scotia House of Assembly from 1928 to 1933 as a Liberal member. He was the first Acadian to practice law in Nova Scotia.

== Early life and education ==
Born in Ste. Anne du Ruisseau, Nova Scotia, he was the son of Dr. Alexandre Pierre Landry and Genevieve Bourque. His father was the first Acadian to receive a medical degree, graduating from Harvard University in 1870. Landry graduated from Dalhousie Law School and was called to the bar in 1910.

== Career ==
Landry served as Deputy Mayor of the Town of Yarmouth from 1912 to 1913.

He was appointed to King's Counsel in 1921.

== Death ==
Landry died on August 22, 1949, at home in Yarmouth after a lengthy illness.
