= Michael Keith =

Michael Keith may refer to:

- Michael Keith, 13th Earl of Kintore (1939–2004), Scottish peer and nobleman
- Michael C. Keith (born 1945), American media historian and author
- Michael Keith, musician in 112

== See also ==
- Mike Keith (disambiguation)
- Michael Keefe (1844–1933), building contractor and political figure in Nova Scotia, Canada
- Michael O'Keefe (disambiguation)
