= Amédée Melanson =

Canadian physician and politician (1882–1930)

MLA for Yarmouth County
- In office 1920–1925
- Preceded by: Henry d'Entremont
- Succeeded by: Raymond Neri d'Entremont

Personal details
- Born: November 9, 1882 Corberrie, Nova Scotia
- Died: May 8, 1930 (aged 47) Eel Brook, Nova Scotia
- Party: Liberal
- Spouse: Marie Julie Hamelin
- Occupation: physician

Amédée Raymond Melanson (November 9, 1882 – May 8, 1930) was a Canadian physician and political figure in Nova Scotia. He represented Yarmouth County in the Nova Scotia House of Assembly from 1920 to 1925 as a Liberal member.

== Early life and education ==
He was born in Corberrie, Digby County, Nova Scotia, the son of Raymond Melanson and Marie LeBlanc. Melanson was educated at St. Anne's College and Dalhousie University.

== Career ==
He set up practice in Sainte-Anne-du-Ruisseau.

== Death ==
He died in Eel Brook, Yarmouth County, Nova Scotia at the age of 47.

== Personal life ==
In 1910, he married Marie Julie Hamelin.
