= 34th Nova Scotia general election =

The 34th Nova Scotia general election may refer to

- the 1906 Nova Scotia general election, the 33rd overall general election for Nova Scotia, for the (due to a counting error in 1859) 34th General Assembly of Nova Scotia,
- the 1911 Nova Scotia general election, the 34th overall general election for Nova Scotia, for the 35th General Assembly of Nova Scotia, but considered the 12th general election for the Canadian province of Nova Scotia, or
- the 1998 Nova Scotia general election, the 56th overall general election for Nova Scotia, for the 57th Legislative Assembly of Nova Scotia, but considered the 34th general election for the Canadian province of Nova Scotia.
