= Benoit Robichaud =

Canadian politician

MLA for Yarmouth
- In office 1967–1970
- Preceded by: George A. Burridge
- Succeeded by: Fraser Mooney

Personal details
- Party: Progressive Conservative
- Occupation: optometrist

Benoit Joseph Robichaud is a Canadian politician. He represented the electoral district of Yarmouth in the Nova Scotia House of Assembly from 1967 to 1970. He was a member of the Progressive Conservative Party of Nova Scotia.

== Before politics ==
Robichaud was an optometrist who operated in Yarmouth, Nova Scotia.

== Political career ==
He entered provincial politics in the 1967 election, winning the dual-member Yarmouth riding with Progressive Conservative George A. Snow. In the 1970 election, Robichaud was defeated when Snow finished 33 votes ahead of him to win the second seat, with Liberal Fraser Mooney winning the first. Robichaud ran again in the 1981 election, but lost to Mooney by 479 votes.
