= 48th Nova Scotia general election =

The 48th Nova Scotia general election may refer to

- the 1963 Nova Scotia general election, the 47th overall general election for Nova Scotia, for the (due to a counting error in 1859) 48th General Assembly of Nova Scotia, or
- the 1967 Nova Scotia general election, the 48th overall general election for Nova Scotia, for the 49th General Assembly of Nova Scotia, but considered the 26th general election for the Canadian province of Nova Scotia.
