= Eric Spinney =

Canadian politician (1886–1972)

Eric H. Spinney

MLA for Yarmouth
- In office 1956–1960
- Preceded by: William H. Brown; Raymond Z. Bourque
- Succeeded by: George A. Burridge

Personal details
- Born: August 10, 1886 Yarmouth, Nova Scotia
- Died: August 2, 1972 (aged 85) Montreal, Quebec
- Party: Nova Scotia Liberal Party
- Occupation: business executive

Eric Harvey Spinney (August 10, 1886 – August 2, 1972) was a Canadian politician. He represented the electoral district of Yarmouth in the Nova Scotia House of Assembly from 1956 to 1960. He was a member of the Nova Scotia Liberal Party.

== Early life and education ==
Spinney was born in 1886 at Yarmouth, Nova Scotia. He was educated at the University of King's College and the University of Toronto, and was a business executive.

== Political career ==
Spinney served as mayor of Yarmouth from 1938 to 1944, and 1946 to 1950.

Spinney entered provincial politics in the 1956 election, winning a seat for the dual-member Yarmouth riding with Liberal Willard O'Brien. He was defeated when he ran for re-election in 1960, losing to O'Brien and Progressive Conservative candidate George A. Burridge.

== Death ==
Spinney died at Montreal on August 2, 1972.

== Personal life ==
He married Flora MacGregor Harding in 1920, and then Eunice Mae Milberry in 1943.
