= Donald J. Fraser =

Canadian politician (1908–1982)

MLA for Yarmouth
- In office 1949–1953
- Preceded by: Henry A. Waterman
- Succeeded by: Raymond Z. Bourque

Personal details
- Born: October 12, 1908 Saint John, New Brunswick
- Died: October 2, 1982 (aged 73) Yarmouth, Nova Scotia
- Party: Nova Scotia Liberal Party
- Occupation: lawyer

Donald Jackson Fraser (October 12, 1908 – October 2, 1982) was a Canadian politician. He represented the electoral district of Yarmouth in the Nova Scotia House of Assembly from 1949 to 1953. He was a member of the Nova Scotia Liberal Party.

Fraser was born in 1908 at Saint John, New Brunswick. He was educated at the University of New Brunswick and Dalhousie University, and was a lawyer by career. Fraser entered provincial politics in the 1949 election, winning the dual-member Yarmouth riding with Progressive Conservative William H. Brown. He was defeated when he ran for re-election in 1953. Fraser died at Yarmouth on October 2, 1982.
