= Lindsay C. Gardner =

Canadian politician (1875–1938)

Lindsay Cann Gardner

MLA for Yarmouth County
- In office 1928–1938
- Preceded by: John Flint Cahan
- Succeeded by: Henry A. Waterman

Speaker of the Nova Scotia House of Assembly
- In office 1934–1938
- Preceded by: Daniel George McKenzie
- Succeeded by: Moses Elijah McGarry

Personal details
- Born: December 27, 1875 Yarmouth, Nova Scotia
- Died: August 23, 1938 (aged 62) Yarmouth, Nova Scotia
- Party: Liberal
- Spouse: Dora Munro
- Occupation: druggist

Lindsay Cann Gardner (December 27, 1875 – August 23, 1938) was a druggist and political figure in Nova Scotia, Canada. He represented Yarmouth County in the Nova Scotia House of Assembly from 1928 to 1938 as a Liberal member.

He was born in Yarmouth, Nova Scotia, the son of George Hunter Gardner and Henrietta Frances Smith. He was educated at the Brooklyn College of Pharmacy in New York state. In 1901, he married Dora A. Munro. Gardner was vice-president and then director for Minard's Liniment Company. Gardner was speaker for the provincial assembly from 1934 to 1938. He died in office at Yarmouth at the age of 62.
