= John Flint Cahan =

Canadian politician (1889–1928)

John Cahan

MLA for Yarmouth County
- In office 1925–1928
- Preceded by: Howard Corning
- Succeeded by: Lindsay C. Gardner

Personal details
- Born: February 1, 1889 Halifax, Nova Scotia, Canada
- Died: November 8, 1928 (aged 39) Halifax, Nova Scotia, Canada
- Party: Liberal-Conservative
- Spouse: Beatrice Eleanor Davies (m. 1912)
- Parent: Charles Cahan (father)

Military service
- Allegiance: Canadian Army
- Unit: 1st Canadian Division
- Battles/wars: World War I

John Flint Cahan (February 1, 1889 – November 8, 1928) was a Canadian engineer and political figure in Nova Scotia, Canada. He represented Yarmouth County in the Nova Scotia House of Assembly from 1925 to 1928 as a Liberal-Conservative member.

== Early life and education ==
He was born in Halifax, the son of Charles Cahan and Mary Chisholm. He was educated at Dalhousie University and McGill University.

== Career ==
Cahan served as a member of the Executive Council of Nova Scotia from 1925 to 1928. He also served as a captain in the 1st Canadian Pioneers during World War I; he was seriously wounded during the war and later died in Halifax at the age of 39 as the result of his wounds.

== Personal life ==
In 1912, Cahan married Beatrice Eleanor Davies.
