= Henry d'Entremont =

Canadian politician (1859–1920)

MLA for Yarmouth County
- In office 1916–1920
- Preceded by: Howard William Corning
- Succeeded by: Amédée Melanson

Personal details
- Born: February 28, 1859 Lower East Pubnico, Nova Scotia
- Died: March 30, 1920 (aged 61) Lower East Pubnico, Nova Scotia
- Party: Liberal
- Occupation: merchant

Henry Thomas d'Entremont (February 28, 1859 – March 30, 1920) was a merchant and political figure in Nova Scotia, Canada. He represented Yarmouth County in the Nova Scotia House of Assembly from 1916 to 1920 as a Liberal member.

== Early life ==
He was born in Lower East Pubnico, Yarmouth County, Nova Scotia, the son of George David d'Entremont and Catherine Murphy. His grandfather was Simon d'Entremont, the first Acadian elected to a legislative assembly in North America.

== Career ==
He opened a general store in Lower East Pubnico in June 1883; he also shipped mackerel, lobster, halibut and blueberries for sale in the United States. D'Entremont married Sophia LeBlanc.

== Death ==
He died in office in Lower East Pubnico at the age of 61.
