= Albert A. Pothier =

Canadian politician (1862–1931)

MLA for Yarmouth County
- In office 1894–1897
- Preceded by: Forman Hatfield
- Succeeded by: Henry S. LeBlanc

Personal details
- Born: July 31, 1862 Wedgeport, Nova Scotia, Canada
- Died: December 31, 1931 (aged 69) Comeau's Hill, Nova Scotia, Canada
- Party: Liberal-Conservative
- Occupation: politician

Albert Agapit Pothier (July 31, 1862 – December 31, 1931) was a Canadian political figure in Nova Scotia. He represented Yarmouth County in the Nova Scotia House of Assembly from 1894 to 1897 as a Liberal-Conservative member.

== Early life ==
He was born in Wedgeport, Nova Scotia, the son of Amand Agapit Pothier and Elizabeth Boudreau.
