= Pierre II Surette =

Acadian man (1709–1789)

- Born: December 9, 1709; Port Royal
- Died: 1789; Ste. Anne du Ruisseau, Nova Scotia
- Known for: British Empire resistance

Pierre II Surette (December 9, 1709 - 1789) was part of the Acadian and Wabanaki Confederacy resistance against the British Empire in Acadia. He was born in Port-Royal in 1709 and married in Grand-Pre, September 30, 1732. After the Treaty of Paris in 1763, he was released from a prison in Halifax and settled in Yarmouth County, Nova Scotia.

== Early life ==
Pierre II Surette's father Pierre was born in the diocese of La Rochelle, France and was a sailor and farmer. He married Jeanne Pellerin at Port Royal (present-day town of Annapolis Royal) in February 1709. They remained at Port Royal and settled in the parish of St.-Laurent on the Haute rivière, now the upper Annapolis River. He was a crew member on Englishman William Winnett's sailing vessel and died at Port Royal in October 1749, age 70. Jeanne died at Québec in January 1758 during Le Grand Dérangement, also at age 70. Their oldest son Pierre II, was born in December 1709 and married Catherine at Grand-Pré in September 1732 and lived at Minas before moving to Petitcoudiac.

== French and Indian War ==
During the French and Indian War, on February 26, 1756, with the Expulsion of the Acadians in full force, Pierre led a daring escape from Fort Cumberland, formerly French Fort Beauséjour, at Chignecto. Eighty Acadians escaped via a tunnel they had dug with discarded horse bones. These families escaped to the woods and managed to elude the British for two years, but they paid a terrible price in doing so, suffering from starvation.

By 1759, they had joined other Acadian refugees at Miramichi, on the Gulf of St. Lawrence shore. There, they suffered almost as much as they had done in the woods north of Chignecto. On November 18, 1759, near Memramcook, Pierre and two other Acadian resistance leaders, Jean and Michel Bourg, surrendered to the British, but, the following spring, Pierre rejoined the resistance movement, at Restigouche on the Baie des Chaleurs. After a British force captured Restigouche in the summer of 1760, Pierre and his family were sent to a prison compound in Nova Scotia, where they were held until the end of the war in 1763.

== After the war ==
After their release, Pierre and his family decided to remain in Nova Scotia, at Chezzetcook near Halifax. Around 1770, Surette and his extended family, along with three of his sons-in-law, Joseph Babin, Jean Bourque and Dominique Pothier, moved to Ste. Anne du Ruisseau, Nova Scotia, present-day Pointe-à-Rocco, northeast of Cap-Sable. These four men are the ancestors of the present-day Acadians of those names in Yarmouth County.

== See also ==
- Military history of the Acadians
