= Cornelius Forman Hatfield =

Canadian politician (1828–1910)

MLA for Yarmouth County
- In office 1890–1894
- Preceded by: Albert Gayton
- Succeeded by: Albert Pothier

Personal details
- Born: December 27, 1828 Tusket, Nova Scotia
- Died: June 13, 1910 (aged 81) Tusket, Nova Scotia
- Party: Liberal
- Spouse(s): Deborah Hatfield; Sarah Bowlby; Marion Anderson
- Occupation: Merchant, shipbuilder, ship owner

Cornelius Forman Hatfield (December 27, 1828 – June 13, 1910) was a merchant, shipbuilder, ship owner and political figure in Nova Scotia, Canada. He represented Yarmouth County in the Nova Scotia House of Assembly from 1890 to 1894 as a Liberal member.

He was born in Tusket, Nova Scotia, the son of Captain James Hatfield and Elizabeth Lent, the daughter of James Lent. Hatfield was married three times: first to Deborah Hatfield, then to Sarah Bowlby in 1844 and finally to Marion Anderson. Forman owned general stores at Tusket and Tusket Wedge. He was a justice of the peace from 1872 to 1910 and served on the municipal council for Argyle township from 1902 to 1910, serving as warden from 1907 to 1910. He also served as coroner. He died in Tusket at the age of 81.

His brother Isaac also served in the provincial assembly.
