= Henry A. Waterman =

Canadian politician (1872–1955)

MLA for Yarmouth
- In office 1938–1949
- Preceded by: Lindsay C. Gardner
- Succeeded by: William Heartz Brown; Donald J. Fraser

Personal details
- Born: June 7, 1872 Yarmouth, Nova Scotia
- Died: October 25, 1955 (aged 83) Yarmouth, Nova Scotia
- Party: Nova Scotia Liberal Party

Henry Arthur Waterman (June 7, 1872 – October 25, 1955) was a Canadian politician. He represented the electoral district of Yarmouth in the Nova Scotia House of Assembly from 1938 to 1949. He was a member of the Nova Scotia Liberal Party.

Waterman was born in 1872 at Yarmouth, Nova Scotia. He was educated at the Massachusetts Institute of Technology, and was a mechanical engineer. He married Coral Davis in 1919, and retired to Yarmouth.

Waterman served as mayor of Yarmouth from 1928 to 1929. Waterman entered provincial politics in 1938, winning a byelection for the Yarmouth riding by acclamation. He was re-elected in the 1941 and 1945 elections. He did not reoffer in the 1949 election. Waterman died at Yarmouth on October 25, 1955.
