= Raymond Z. Bourque =

Canadian politician (1917–1998)

MLA for Yarmouth
- In office 1953–1956
- Preceded by: Donald J. Fraser
- Succeeded by: Willard O'Brien; Eric Spinney

Personal details
- Born: September 11, 1917 Sluice Point, Nova Scotia
- Died: May 31, 1998 (aged 80) Northfield, Ohio
- Party: Progressive Conservative

Raymond Zacharie Bourque (September 11, 1917 – May 31, 1998) was a Canadian politician. He represented the electoral district of Yarmouth in the Nova Scotia House of Assembly from 1953 to 1956. He was a member of the Progressive Conservative Party of Nova Scotia.

Bourque was born in Sluice Point, Nova Scotia, the son of Antoine and Marie Rose (Muise) Bourque. He married Bernadine Mary Belliveau in 1940. Bourque entered provincial politics in 1953 when he was elected in the dual-member Yarmouth County riding with Progressive Conservative William Heartz Brown. Both Bourque and Brown were defeated when they ran for re-election in 1956, losing to Liberals Willard O'Brien and Eric Spinney. Following his political career, Bourque moved to Ohio and was employed at the estate of Cyrus S. Eaton. Bourque died at Northfield, Ohio on May 31, 1998.
