= Cumberland Centre =

Former provincial electoral district in Nova Scotia, Canada

Nova Scotia electoral district

Defunct provincial electoral district
- Legislature: Nova Scotia House of Assembly
- District created: 1949
- District abolished: 1993
- Last contested: 1988

Cumberland Centre was a provincial electoral district in Nova Scotia, Canada, that elected one member of the Nova Scotia House of Assembly. It existed from 1949 to 1993. It was formed in 1949 when Cumberland County was divided into three new districts, the other two being Cumberland West and Cumberland East.

== Members of the Legislative Assembly ==
This electoral district elected the following members of the Legislative Assembly:

Cumberland Centre
| Legislature | Years | Member | Party |
|---|---|---|---|
District created from Cumberland County (1867–1949)
| 44th | 1949–1953 | Archibald J. Mason | Liberal |
| 45th | 1953–1956 | Stephen T. Pyke | Progressive Conservative |
| 46th | 1956–1960 | Stephen T. Pyke | Progressive Conservative |
| 47th | 1960–1963 | Stephen T. Pyke | Progressive Conservative |
| 48th | 1963–1967 | Stephen T. Pyke | Progressive Conservative |
| 49th | 1967–1968 | Stephen T. Pyke | Progressive Conservative |
| 49th | 1968–1970 | Raymond M. Smith | Progressive Conservative |
| 50th | 1970–1974 | Raymond M. Smith | Progressive Conservative |
| 51st | 1974–1978 | Guy Brown | Liberal |
| 52nd | 1978–1981 | Guy Brown | Liberal |
| 53rd | 1981–1984 | Guy Brown | Liberal |
| 54th | 1984–1988 | Guy Brown | Liberal |
| 55th | 1988–1993 | Guy Brown | Liberal |

== Election results ==
=== 1988 ===
1988 Nova Scotia general election
| Party | Candidate | Votes | % | ±% |
|---|---|---|---|---|
| Liberal | Guy Brown | 3,117 | 71.05% | 15.65% |
| Progressive Conservative | Scott Lockart | 1,108 | 25.26% | -15.77% |
| New Democratic | Gary Thomas | 162 | 3.69% | 0.12% |
| Total | | 4,387 | – | |
Source(s) Source: Nova Scotia Legislature (2024). "Electoral History for Cumberland Centre" (PDF). nslegislature.ca. Nova Scotia, Chief Electoral Officer (1988). Returns of the General Election for the House of Assembly, Thirty-Second General Election (PDF) (Report). Queen's Printer. Archived from the original (PDF) on 7 July 2018.

=== 1984 ===
1984 Nova Scotia general election
| Party | Candidate | Votes | % | ±% |
|---|---|---|---|---|
| Liberal | Guy Brown | 2,436 | 55.40% | -4.05% |
| Progressive Conservative | Douglas Marshall | 1,804 | 41.03% | 7.16% |
| New Democratic | Stanley H. McCormick | 157 | 3.57% | -3.11% |
| Total | | 4,397 | – | |
Source(s) Source: Nova Scotia Legislature (2024). "Electoral History for Cumberland Centre" (PDF). nslegislature.ca. Nova Scotia, Chief Electoral Officer (1984). Returns of the General Election for the House of Assembly, Thirty-First General Election (PDF) (Report). Queen's Printer. Archived from the original (PDF) on 31 July 2017.

=== 1981 ===
1981 Nova Scotia general election
| Party | Candidate | Votes | % | ±% |
|---|---|---|---|---|
| Liberal | Guy Brown | 2,579 | 59.45% | 5.70% |
| Progressive Conservative | Arthur L. Brennan | 1,469 | 33.86% | 4.93% |
| New Democratic | Florence Welton | 290 | 6.69% | -10.63% |
| Total | | 4,338 | – | |
Source(s) Source: Nova Scotia Legislature (2024). "Electoral History for Cumberland Centre" (PDF). nslegislature.ca. Nova Scotia, Chief Electoral Officer (1981). Returns of the General Election for the House of Assembly, Thirtieth General Election (PDF) (Report). Queen's Printer. Archived from the original (PDF) on 31 July 2017.

=== 1978 ===
1978 Nova Scotia general election
| Party | Candidate | Votes | % | ±% |
|---|---|---|---|---|
| Liberal | Guy Brown | 2,515 | 53.75% | 1.59% |
| Progressive Conservative | Russell Fisher | 1,354 | 28.94% | -7.64% |
| New Democratic | Dennis R. Calder | 810 | 17.31% | 6.05% |
| Total | | 4,679 | – | |
Source(s) Source: Nova Scotia Legislature (2024). "Electoral History for Cumberland Centre" (PDF). nslegislature.ca. Nova Scotia, Chief Electoral Officer (1978). Returns of the General Election for the House of Assembly, Twenty-Ninth General Election (PDF) (Report). Queen's Printer. Archived from the original (PDF) on 18 June 2018.

=== 1974 ===
1974 Nova Scotia general election
| Party | Candidate | Votes | % | ±% |
|---|---|---|---|---|
| Liberal | Guy Brown | 2,283 | 52.16% | 12.34% |
| Progressive Conservative | Raymond M. Smith | 1,601 | 36.58% | -18.29% |
| New Democratic | Elroy Tabor | 493 | 11.26% | 5.95% |
| Total | | 4,377 | – | |
Source(s) Source: Nova Scotia Legislature (2024). "Electoral History for Cumberland Centre" (PDF). nslegislature.ca. Nova Scotia, Chief Electoral Officer (1974). Returns of the General Election for the House of Assembly, Twenty-Eighth General Election (PDF) (Report). Queen's Printer. Archived from the original (PDF) on 18 June 2018.

=== 1970 ===
1970 Nova Scotia general election
| Party | Candidate | Votes | % | ±% |
|---|---|---|---|---|
| Progressive Conservative | Raymond M. Smith | 2,220 | 54.87% | -2.90% |
| Liberal | William H. Mont | 1,611 | 39.82% | -2.41% |
| New Democratic | John E. Burbine | 215 | 5.31% | – |
| Total | | 4,046 | – | |
Source(s) Source: Nova Scotia Legislature (2024). "Electoral History for Cumberland Centre" (PDF). nslegislature.ca. Nova Scotia, Legislative Assembly (1970). Returns of the General Election for the House of Assembly, 1970 (PDF) (Report). Queen's Printer. Archived from the original (PDF) on 25 July 2018.

=== 1968 by-election ===
Nova Scotia provincial by-election, November 11, 1968 resignation of Stephen T. Pyke
| Party | Candidate | Votes | % | ±% |
|---|---|---|---|---|
| Progressive Conservative | Raymond M. Smith | 2,030 | 57.77% | -9.57% |
| Liberal | William H. Mont | 1,484 | 42.23% | 13.99% |
| Total | | 3,514 | – | |
Source(s) Source: Nova Scotia Legislature (2024). "Electoral History for Cumberland Centre" (PDF). nslegislature.ca.

=== 1967 ===
1967 Nova Scotia general election
| Party | Candidate | Votes | % | ±% |
|---|---|---|---|---|
| Progressive Conservative | Stephen T. Pyke | 2,437 | 67.34% | 0.66% |
| Liberal | Charles H. Sarson | 1,022 | 28.24% | -5.08% |
| New Democratic | J. Reginald Daborn | 160 | 4.42% | – |
| Total | | 3,619 | – | |
Source(s) Source: Nova Scotia Legislature (2024). "Electoral History for Cumberland Centre" (PDF). nslegislature.ca. Nova Scotia Legislature (1967). Returns of the General Election for the House of Assembly (PDF) (Report). Queen's Printer. Archived from the original (PDF) on 25 July 2018.

=== 1963 ===
1963 Nova Scotia general election
| Party | Candidate | Votes | % | ±% |
|---|---|---|---|---|
| Progressive Conservative | Stephen T. Pyke | 2,545 | 66.68% | 13.76% |
| Liberal | William Thomas Noiles | 1,272 | 33.32% | -6.86% |
| Total | | 3,817 | – | |
Source(s) Source: Nova Scotia Legislature (2024). "Electoral History for Cumberland Centre" (PDF). nslegislature.ca. Nova Scotia Legislature (1963). Returns of the General Election for the House of Assembly (PDF) (Report). Queen's Printer. Archived from the original (PDF) on 25 July 2018.

=== 1960 ===
1960 Nova Scotia general election
| Party | Candidate | Votes | % | ±% |
|---|---|---|---|---|
| Progressive Conservative | Stephen T. Pyke | 2,308 | 52.91% | -7.38% |
| Liberal | Ralph F. Gilroy | 1,753 | 40.19% | 0.48% |
| Co-operative Commonwealth | John R. Tabor | 301 | 6.90% | – |
| Total | | 4,362 | – | |
Source(s) Source: Nova Scotia Legislature (2024). "Electoral History for Cumberland Centre" (PDF). nslegislature.ca. Nova Scotia Legislature (1960). Returns of the General Election for the House of Assembly (PDF) (Report). Queen's Printer. Archived from the original (PDF) on 25 July 2018.

=== 1956 ===
1956 Nova Scotia general election
| Party | Candidate | Votes | % | ±% |
|---|---|---|---|---|
| Progressive Conservative | Stephen T. Pyke | 2,738 | 60.30% | 14.60% |
| Liberal | Ralph F. Gilroy | 1,803 | 39.70% | -0.94% |
| Total | | 4,541 | – | |
Source(s) Source: Nova Scotia Legislature (2024). "Electoral History for Cumberland Centre" (PDF). nslegislature.ca. Nova Scotia Legislature (1956). Returns of the General Election for the House of Assembly (PDF) (Report). Queen's Printer. Archived from the original (PDF) on 10 September 2018.

=== 1953 ===
1953 Nova Scotia general election
| Party | Candidate | Votes | % | ±% |
|---|---|---|---|---|
| Progressive Conservative | Stephen T. Pyke | 2,262 | 45.70% | 14.98% |
| Liberal | Archibald J. Mason | 2,012 | 40.65% | -1.77% |
| Co-operative Commonwealth | Florence Welton | 676 | 13.66% | -13.22% |
| Total | | 4,950 | – | |
Source(s) Source: Nova Scotia Legislature (2024). "Electoral History for Cumberland Centre" (PDF). nslegislature.ca. Nova Scotia Legislature (1953). Returns of the General Election for the House of Assembly (PDF) (Report). Queen's Printer. Archived from the original (PDF) on 10 September 2018.

=== 1949 ===
1949 Nova Scotia general election
| Party | Candidate | Votes | % | ±% |
|---|---|---|---|---|
| Liberal | Archibald J. Mason | 2,219 | 42.41% | – |
| Progressive Conservative | Archie B. Smith | 1,607 | 30.71% | – |
| Co-operative Commonwealth | Florence Welton | 1,406 | 26.87% | – |
| Total | | 5,232 | – | |
Source(s) Source: Nova Scotia Legislature (2024). "Electoral History for Cumberland Centre" (PDF). nslegislature.ca. Nova Scotia Legislature (1949). Returns of the General Election for the House of Assembly (PDF) (Report). Queen's Printer. Archived from the original (PDF) on 10 September 2018.

== See also ==
- List of Nova Scotia provincial electoral districts
- Canadian provincial electoral districts
