= Hiram Thomas =

Canadian politician

MLA for Kings West
- In office 1956–1960
- Preceded by: new riding
- Succeeded by: Edward D. MacArthur

Personal details
- Born: March 31, 1889 Rockland, Nova Scotia
- Died: March 24, 1974 (aged 84) Berwick, Nova Scotia
- Party: Progressive Conservative
- Occupation: fruit grower

Hiram Thomas (March 31, 1889 – March 24, 1974) was a Canadian politician. He represented the electoral district of Kings West in the Nova Scotia House of Assembly from 1956 to 1960. He was a member of the Progressive Conservative Party of Nova Scotia.

Born in 1889 at Rockland, Kings County, Nova Scotia, Thomas was a fruit grower by career. He married Frances Evelyn Coldwell in 1940. Thomas served as mayor of Berwick, Nova Scotia. Thomas made two unsuccessful attempts at entering federal politics, finishing second in Digby—Annapolis—Kings in the 1940 and 1945 federal elections. He first attempted to enter provincial politics in the 1949 election, but was defeated in the dual-member Kings riding. Thomas ran again in the 1956 election, winning the new Kings West riding by 3 votes. He was replaced by Liberal Edward D. MacArthur when he chose not to run for re-election in 1960. Thomas died at Berwick on March 24, 1974.
