= Albert Gayton =

Canadian politician (1840–1923)

MLA for Yarmouth
- In office 1871–1890
- Preceded by: John K. Ryerson
- Succeeded by: Forman Hatfield

Personal details
- Born: December 30, 1840 Argyle, Nova Scotia
- Died: March 7, 1923 (aged 82) Yarmouth, Nova Scotia
- Party: Liberal
- Spouse: Helen Hamilton
- Occupation: Merchant

Albert Gayton (December 30, 1840 – March 7, 1923) was a merchant and political figure in Nova Scotia, Canada. He represented Yarmouth County in the Nova Scotia House of Assembly from 1871 to 1890 as a Liberal member.

He was born in Argyle, Nova Scotia, the son of James Gayton and Miriam Hamilton. In 1862, he married Helen Hamilton. He was Commissioner of Public Works and Mines for the province from 1877 to 1878 and was Commissioner of Mines in 1882 to 1884. Gayton also served as chairman of the Board of Public Charities for Nova Scotia. In 1890, he was named registrar of deeds for Yarmouth County and served in that post until one year before his death in Yarmouth on March 7, 1923.

He wrote the booklet The Gayton Genealogy, Descendants of Thomas Gayton of Argyle, Nova Scotia, which was published in 1918. This booklet is very rare, and a PDF copy of it has been sent to the Yarmouth County Museum. Thomas Gayton (the 1st) came from Tipperary, Ireland.
