= Michael O'Keefe (disambiguation) =

Michael O'Keefe (born 1955) is an American film and television actor.

Michael O'Keefe or O'Keeffe may also refer to:

- Michael A. O'Keefe (born 1942), Australian physicist
- Michael Kenny O'Keefe (born 1963), American judge on the D.C. Superior Court
- Michael O'Keeffe (footballer) (born 1990), New Zealand footballer
- Michael O'Keeffe (chemist) (born 1934), American crystallographer
- Michael O'Keefe (Tasmanian politician) (1864–1926), Australian politician in Tasmania
- Michael O'Keefe (American politician) (1932–2021), American politician in Louisiana
- Michael O'Keeffe (Queensland politician) (1854–1941), Australian politician in Queensland
- Michael O'Keeffe, co-founder and first president of First National Stores

== See also ==
- Miles O'Keeffe (born 1954), American movie star of the 1980s
- Michael Edwin Keefe (1844–1933), Nova Scotia politician
- Michael Keith (disambiguation)
