= Howard Corning =

Canadian politician (1879–1924)

Howard William Corning

MLA for Yarmouth County
- In office 1911–1916
- Preceded by: Henry S. LeBlanc
- Succeeded by: Henry d'Entremont

MLA for Yarmouth County
- In office 1920–1924
- Preceded by: Ernest Howard Armstrong
- Succeeded by: John Flint Cahan

Personal details
- Born: April 17, 1879 Chegoggin, Nova Scotia
- Died: September 24, 1924 (aged 45)
- Party: Liberal-Conservative
- Occupation: cattle farmer

Howard William Corning (April 17, 1879 – September 29, 1924) was a cattle farmer and political figure in Nova Scotia, Canada. He represented Yarmouth County in the Nova Scotia House of Assembly from 1911 to 1916 and from 1920 to 1924 as a Liberal-Conservative member. He was house leader of the party from 1921 until his death in 1924.

He was born in Chegoggin, Yarmouth County, Nova Scotia, the son of William Corning and Hannah Hibbard. In 1901, he married Eleanor Gertrude Churchill. He served as president of the Nova Scotia Farmers' Association in 1913 and 1914 and was also secretary for the Guernsey Breeders' Association.
