= Yarmouth (provincial electoral district) =

Provincial electoral district in Nova Scotia, Canada

Nova Scotia electoral district

Provincial electoral district
- Legislature: Nova Scotia House of Assembly
MLA
Nick Hilton
Progressive Conservative
- District created: 1867
- First contested: 1867
- Last contested: 2024

Demographics
- Population (2021): 17,078
- Electors (2024): 14,447
- Area (km²): 784
- Pop. density (per km²): 21.8
- Census division(s): Digby County, Yarmouth County
- Census subdivision(s): Argyle, Clare, Yarmouth (town), Yarmouth (municipal district)

Yarmouth is a provincial electoral district in Nova Scotia, Canada, that elects one member of the Nova Scotia House of Assembly. It consists of the Municipality of the District of Yarmouth and the town of Yarmouth, and small parts of the municipal districts of Argyle and Clare.

From 1867 to 1981, the district included all of Yarmouth County and for most of that time elected two members in order to allow the district to enjoy both Protestant and Catholic representation in the legislature. In 1981, the district was redistributed and reduced to having just one MLA. The Municipality of Argyle received its own electoral district.

== Geography ==
Yarmouth covers 784 km^{2} (303 sq mi) of land area.

== Members of the Legislative Assembly ==
This riding has elected the following members of the Legislative Assembly:

Legislature	Years	Member	Party
64th	2024–present	Nick Hilton	Progressive Conservative
64th	2021–2024	Zach Churchill	Liberal
63rd	2017–2021	Zach Churchill	Liberal
62nd	2013–2017	Zach Churchill	Liberal
61st	2010–2013	Zach Churchill	Liberal
61st	2009–2010	Richard Hurlburt	Progressive Conservative
60th	2006–2009	Richard Hurlburt	Progressive Conservative
59th	2003–2006	Richard Hurlburt	Progressive Conservative
58th	1999–2003	Richard Hurlburt	Progressive Conservative
57th	1998–1999	John Deveau	New Democratic
56th	1993–1998	Richie Hubbard	Liberal
55th	1988–1993	Leroy Legere	Progressive Conservative
54th	1984–1988	Alex McIntosh	Progressive Conservative
53rd	1981–1984	Fraser Mooney	Liberal
Yarmouth returned two members between 1949 and 1981
52nd	1978–1981	Fraser Mooney	Liberal	Hugh Tinkham	Liberal
51st	1974–1978	Fraser Mooney	Liberal	Hugh Tinkham	Liberal
50th	1970–1974	Fraser Mooney	Liberal	George Snow	Progressive Conservative
49th	1967–1970	Benoit Robichaud	Progressive Conservative	George Snow	Progressive Conservative
48th	1963–1967	George Burridge	Progressive Conservative	George Snow	Progressive Conservative
47th	1960–1963	George Burridge	Progressive Conservative	Willard O'Brien	Liberal
46th	1956–1960	Eric Spinney	Liberal	Willard O'Brien	Liberal
45th	1953–1956	William Brown	Progressive Conservative	Raymond Z. Bourque	Progressive Conservative
44th	1949–1953	William Brown	Progressive Conservative	Donald J. Fraser	Liberal
Yarmouth returned one member between 1933 and 1949
43rd	1945–1949	Henry A. Waterman	Liberal
42nd	1941–1945	Henry A. Waterman	Liberal
41st	1937–1941	Lindsay Gardner	Liberal
40th	1933–1937	Lindsay Gardner	Liberal
Yarmouth returned two members before 1933
39th	1928–1933	Lindsay Gardner	Liberal	René W.E. Landry	Liberal
38th	1925–1928	John Flint Cahan	Liberal-Conservative	Raymond Neri d'Entremont	Liberal-Conservative
37th	1920–1925	Howard Corning	Liberal-Conservative	Amédée Melanson	Liberal
36th	1916–1920	Ernest Howard Armstrong	Liberal	Henry Thomas d'Entremont	Liberal
35th	1911–1916	Ernest Howard Armstrong	Liberal	Howard Corning	Liberal-Conservative
34th	1906–1911	Ernest Howard Armstrong	Liberal	Henry S. LeBlanc	Liberal
33rd	1904–1906	George Sanderson	Liberal	Henry S. LeBlanc	Liberal
33rd	1901–1904	Augustus Stoneman	Liberal	Henry S. LeBlanc	Liberal
32nd	1900–1901	Augustus Stoneman	Liberal	Henry S. LeBlanc	Liberal
32nd	1897–1900	William Law	Liberal	Henry S. LeBlanc	Liberal
31st	1894–1897	William Law	Liberal	Albert A. Pothier	Liberal-Conservative
30th	1890–1894	William Law	Liberal	Forman Hatfield	Liberal
30th	1890	William Law	Liberal	Albert Gayton	Liberal
29th	1886–1890	William Law	Liberal	Albert Gayton	Liberal
28th	1882–1886	Thomas Corning	Conservative	Albert Gayton	Liberal
27th	1878–1882	Joseph Robbins Kinney	Conservative	Albert Gayton	Liberal
26th	1874–1878	John Lovitt	Liberal	Albert Gayton	Liberal
25th	1872–1874	John K. Ryerson	Liberal	Albert Gayton	Liberal
25th	1871–1872	William H. Townsend	Liberal	Albert Gayton	Liberal
24th	1867–1871	William H. Townsend	Liberal	John K. Ryerson	Liberal

== Election results ==
=== 2024 ===
2024 Nova Scotia general election
Party	Candidate	Votes	%	±%
Progressive Conservative	Nick Hilton	3,663	48.32	+11.29
Liberal	Zach Churchill	3,647	48.11	-8.21
New Democratic	Gillian Rowley	208	2.74	-1.43
Green	Adam Randall	62	0.82	-1.66
Total valid votes		7,580	99.59	
Total rejected ballots		31	0.41	0.00
Turnout		7,611	52.68	-2.07
Eligible voters		14,447		
Progressive Conservative gain from Liberal		Swing		+9.77
Source: Elections Nova Scotia

=== 2021 ===
2021 Nova Scotia general election
Party	Candidate	Votes	%	±%	Expenditures
Liberal	Zach Churchill	4,344	56.32	-11.83	$58,801.54
Progressive Conservative	Candice Clairmont	2,856	37.03	+11.52	$25,664.36
New Democratic	SJ Rogers	322	4.17	+1.09	$22,219.74
Green	Adam Randall	191	2.48	-0.78	$2,571.40
Total valid votes/expense limit		7,713	99.56	–	$82,204.88
Total rejected ballots		34	0.44		
Turnout		7,747	54.75		
Eligible voters		14,151			
Liberal hold		Swing		-11.68	
Source: Elections Nova Scotia

=== 2017 ===
2017 provincial election redistributed results
Party	Vote	%
Liberal	5,365	68.15
Progressive Conservative	2,008	25.51
Green	256	3.25
New Democratic	243	3.09

2017 Nova Scotia general election
Party	Candidate	Votes	%	±%
Liberal	Zach Churchill	5,364	68.17	-13.91
Progressive Conservative	Mitch Bonnar	2,007	25.50	+11.19
Green	Jim Laverie	255	3.24	+2.26
New Democratic	David Olie	243	3.08	+0.44
Total valid votes		7,869	100	
Total rejected ballots		44	0.56	-0.23
Turnout		7,913	57.66	-7.04
Eligible voters		13,724		
Liberal hold		Swing		-12.55
Source: Elections Nova Scotia

=== 2013 ===
2013 Nova Scotia general election
Party	Candidate	Votes	%	±%
Liberal	Zach Churchill	7,130	82.30	+31.64
Progressive Conservative	John Cunningham	1,233	14.23	-19.17
New Democratic	Charles Webster	217	2.50	-4.02
Green	Vanessa Goodwin-Clairmont	83	0.96	+0.35
Total valid votes		8,663	100.00	
Total rejected ballots		29	0.33	
Turnout		8,692	64.70	
Eligible voters		13,868		
Source(s) Source: Nova Scotia Legislature (2024). "Electoral History for Yarmouth" (PDF). nslegislature.ca. Nova Scotia, Chief Electoral Officer (2013). 39th Provincial General Election, October 8, 2013: Volume 1 – Statement of Votes & Statistics (PDF) (Report). Elections Nova Scotia. Archived from the original (PDF) on 10 April 2018.

=== 2010 by-election ===
Nova Scotia provincial by-election, June 22, 2010
Party	Candidate	Votes	%	±%
Liberal	Zach Churchill	3,986	50.67	+36.59
Progressive Conservative	Charles A. Crosby	2,628	33.41	-27.93
Independent	Belle Hatfield	673	8.55	–
New Democratic	John Deveau	513	6.52	-16.41
Green	John H. Percy	48	0.61	-1.05
Independent (Atlantica)	Jonathan G. Dean	19	0.24	–
Total valid votes		7,867	100.00	
Total rejected ballots		50	0.63	
Turnout		7,917	59.25	
Eligible voters		13,361		
Source(s) Source: Nova Scotia Legislature (2024). "Electoral History for Yarmouth" (PDF). nslegislature.ca.

=== 2009 ===
2009 Nova Scotia general election
Party	Candidate	Votes	%	±%
Progressive Conservative	Richard Hurlburt	4,537	61.34%	-2.97%
New Democratic	David Olie	1,696	22.93%	2.19%
Liberal	David Mooney	1,041	14.07%	1.00%
Green	Ronald Mills	123	1.66%	-0.23%
Total valid votes		7,397	100.00	
Total rejected ballots		38	0.51	
Turnout		7,435	56.34	
Eligible voters		13,197		
Source(s) Source: Nova Scotia Legislature (2021). "Electoral History for Yarmouth" (PDF). nslegislature.ca. Archived from the original (PDF) on 8 November 2018.

=== 2006 ===
2006 Nova Scotia general election
Party	Candidate	Votes	%	±%
Progressive Conservative	Richard Hurlburt	5,170	64.30%	7.83%
New Democratic	John Deveau	1,667	20.73%	6.88%
Liberal	Dolores Atwood	1,051	13.07%	-16.60%
Green	Matthew Granger	152	1.89%	–
Total valid votes		8,040	100.00	
Total rejected ballots		20	0.25	
Turnout		8,060	68.33	
Eligible voters		12,849		
Source(s) Source: Nova Scotia Legislature (2021). "Electoral History for Yarmouth" (PDF). nslegislature.ca. Archived from the original (PDF) on 8 November 2018.

=== 2003 ===
2003 Nova Scotia general election
Party	Candidate	Votes	%	±%
Progressive Conservative	Richard Hurlburt	4,656	56.48%	22.46%
Liberal	Phil DeMille	2,446	29.67%	1.46%
New Democratic	Gillian Rowley	1,142	13.85%	-19.49%
Total valid votes		8,244	100.00	
Total rejected ballots		35	0.42	
Turnout		8,279	70.18	
Eligible voters		11,797		
Source(s) Source: Nova Scotia Legislature (2021). "Electoral History for Yarmouth" (PDF). nslegislature.ca. Archived from the original (PDF) on 8 November 2018.

=== 1999 ===
1999 Nova Scotia general election
Party	Candidate	Votes	%	±%
Progressive Conservative	Richard Hurlburt	3,141	34.02%	4.05%
New Democratic	John Deveau	3,079	33.34%	-11.47%
Liberal	Phil DeMille	2,605	28.21%	2.99%
Nova Scotia Party	Brian W. Hurlburt	409	4.43%	–
Total valid votes		9,234	100.00	
Total rejected ballots		58	0.62	
Turnout		9,292	74.54	
Eligible voters		12,465		
Source(s) Source: Nova Scotia Legislature (2021). "Electoral History for Yarmouth" (PDF). nslegislature.ca. Archived from the original (PDF) on 8 November 2018.

=== 1998 ===
1998 Nova Scotia general election
Party	Candidate	Votes	%	±%
New Democratic	John Deveau	3,931	44.81%	30.02%
Progressive Conservative	Alex McIntosh	2,629	29.97%	-2.11%
Liberal	Richie Hubbard	2,212	25.22%	-27.91%
Total valid votes		8,772	100.00	
Total rejected ballots		53	0.60	
Turnout		8,825	71.16	
Eligible voters		12,402		
Source(s) Source: Nova Scotia Legislature (2021). "Electoral History for Yarmouth" (PDF). nslegislature.ca. Archived from the original (PDF) on 8 November 2018.

=== 1993 ===
1993 Nova Scotia general election
Party	Candidate	Votes	%	±%
Liberal	Richie Hubbard	5,197	53.13%	11.69%
Progressive Conservative	Leroy Legere	3,138	32.08%	-12.78%
New Democratic	Ian MacPherson	1,447	14.79%	1.09%
Total valid votes		9,782	100.00	
Total rejected ballots		88	0.89	
Turnout		9,870	74.47	
Eligible voters		13,253		
Source(s) Source: Nova Scotia Legislature (2021). "Electoral History for Yarmouth" (PDF). nslegislature.ca. Archived from the original (PDF) on 8 November 2018.

=== 1988 ===
1988 Nova Scotia general election
Party	Candidate	Votes	%	±%
Progressive Conservative	Leroy Legere	4,479	44.86%	-4.30%
Liberal	Fraser Mooney	4,138	41.44%	-0.51%
New Democratic	Brian Noble	1,368	13.70%	4.82%
Total		9,985	–	
Source(s) Source: Nova Scotia Legislature (2024). "Electoral History for Yarmouth" (PDF). nslegislature.ca. Nova Scotia Legislature (1988). Returns of the General Election for the House of Assembly, Thirty-Second General Election (PDF). Queen's Printer. Archived from the original (PDF) on 7 July 2018.

=== 1984 ===
1984 Nova Scotia general election
Party	Candidate	Votes	%	±%
Progressive Conservative	Alex McIntosh	4,400	49.16%	8.77%
Liberal	Fraser Mooney	3,755	41.96%	-4.14%
New Democratic	Brian Doucette	795	8.88%	-4.63%
Total		8,950	–	
Source(s) Source: Nova Scotia Legislature (2024). "Electoral History for Yarmouth" (PDF). nslegislature.ca. Nova Scotia Legislature (1984). Returns of the General Election for the House of Assembly, Thirty-First General Election (PDF). Queen's Printer. Archived from the original (PDF) on 31 July 2017.

=== 1981 ===
1981 Nova Scotia general election
Party	Candidate	Votes	%	±%
Liberal	Fraser Mooney	3,868	46.10%	-11.51%
Progressive Conservative	Benoit Robichaud	3,389	40.39%	7.50%
New Democratic	Hartley Wickens	1,134	13.51%	4.02%
Total		8,391	–	
Source(s) Source: Nova Scotia Legislature (2024). "Electoral History for Yarmouth" (PDF). nslegislature.ca. Nova Scotia Legislature (1981). Returns of the General Election for the House of Assembly, Thirteith General Election (PDF). Queen's Printer. Archived from the original (PDF) on 31 July 2017.

=== 1978 ===
1978 Nova Scotia general election
Party	Candidate	Votes	%	Elected
Liberal	Fraser Mooney	7,568	29.25%	✓
Liberal	Hugh Tinkham	7,339	28.36%	✓
Progressive Conservative	Dorothy M. Crosby	4,389	16.96%	
Progressive Conservative	Harold H. Hanf	4,122	15.93%	
New Democratic	Hartley Wickens	1,268	4.90%	
New Democratic	Charles Paddock	1,190	4.60%	
Total		25,876	–	
Source(s) Source: Nova Scotia Legislature (2024). "Electoral History for Yarmouth" (PDF). nslegislature.ca. Nova Scotia Legislature (1978). Returns of the General Election for the House of Assembly, Twenty-Ninth General Election (PDF). Queen's Printer. Archived from the original (PDF) on 18 June 2018.

=== 1974 ===
1974 Nova Scotia general election
Party	Candidate	Votes	%	Elected
Liberal	Fraser Mooney	8,098	32.87%	✓
Liberal	Hugh Tinkham	7,068	28.69%	✓
Progressive Conservative	George A. Snow	4,300	17.45%	
Progressive Conservative	Martin Cottreau	4,029	16.35%	
New Democratic	Lawrence Dukeshire	637	2.59%	
New Democratic	Leslie Babin	504	2.05%	
Total		24,636	–	
Source(s) Source: Nova Scotia Legislature (2024). "Electoral History for Yarmouth" (PDF). nslegislature.ca. Nova Scotia Legislature (1974). Returns of the General Election for the House of Assembly, Twenty-Eighth General Election (PDF). Queen's Printer. Archived from the original (PDF) on 18 June 2018.

=== 1970 ===
1970 Nova Scotia general election
Party	Candidate	Votes	%	Elected
Liberal	Fraser Mooney	5,039	25.90%	✓
Progressive Conservative	George A. Snow	4,929	25.33%	✓
Progressive Conservative	Benoit Robichaud	4,896	25.16%	
Liberal	Jack Rogers	4,592	23.60%	
Total		19,456	–	
Source(s) Source: Nova Scotia Legislature (2024). "Electoral History for Yarmouth" (PDF). nslegislature.ca. Nova Scotia Legislature (1970). Legislature of Nova Scotia Election Returns (PDF). Queen's Printer. Archived from the original (PDF) on 25 July 2018.

=== 1967 ===
1967 Nova Scotia general election
Party	Candidate	Votes	%	Elected
Progressive Conservative	George A. Snow	5,345	28.37%	✓
Progressive Conservative	Benoit Robichaud	5,003	26.56%	✓
Liberal	Fraser Mooney	4,463	23.69%	
Liberal	Earle Maberly	3,699	19.63%	
Independent	Willard Franklyn Allen	329	1.75%	
Total		18,839	–	
Source(s) Source: Nova Scotia Legislature (2024). "Electoral History for Yarmouth" (PDF). nslegislature.ca. Nova Scotia Legislature (1967). Legislature of Nova Scotia Election Returns (PDF). Queen's Printer. Archived from the original (PDF) on 25 July 2018.

=== 1963 ===
1963 Nova Scotia general election
Party	Candidate	Votes	%	Elected
Progressive Conservative	George A. Snow	5,077	26.19%	✓
Progressive Conservative	George A. Burridge	4,884	25.20%	✓
Liberal	Willard O'Brien	4,719	24.35%	
Liberal	Irving Charles Pink	4,345	22.42%	
New Democratic	Angus Boyd MacGillivray	358	1.85%	
Total		19,383	–	
Source(s) Source: Nova Scotia Legislature (2024). "Electoral History for Yarmouth" (PDF). nslegislature.ca. Nova Scotia Legislature (1963). Legislature of Nova Scotia Election Returns (PDF). Queen's Printer. Archived from the original (PDF) on 25 July 2018.

=== 1960 ===
1960 Nova Scotia general election
Party	Candidate	Votes	%	Elected
Liberal	Willard O'Brien	5,037	25.98%	✓
Progressive Conservative	George A. Burridge	4,811	24.82%	✓
Progressive Conservative	George A. Snow	4,578	23.62%	
Liberal	Eric Spinney	4,309	22.23%	
Independent	Willard Franklyn Allen	650	3.35%	
Total		19,385	–	
Source(s) Source: Nova Scotia Legislature (2024). "Electoral History for Yarmouth" (PDF). nslegislature.ca. Nova Scotia Legislature (1960). Legislature of Nova Scotia Election Returns (PDF). Queen's Printer. Archived from the original (PDF) on 25 July 2018.

=== 1956 ===
1956 Nova Scotia general election
Party	Candidate	Votes	%	Elected
Liberal	Willard O'Brien	5,438	29.76%	✓
Liberal	Eric Spinney	4,876	26.68%	✓
Progressive Conservative	William Heartz Brown	4,007	21.93%	
Progressive Conservative	Raymond Z. Bourque	3,953	21.63%	
Total		18,274	–	
Source(s) Source: Nova Scotia Legislature (2024). "Electoral History for Yarmouth" (PDF). nslegislature.ca. Nova Scotia Legislature (1956). Legislature of Nova Scotia Election Returns (PDF). Queen's Printer. Archived from the original (PDF) on 10 September 2018.

=== 1953 ===
1953 Nova Scotia general election
Party	Candidate	Votes	%	Elected
Progressive Conservative	William Heartz Brown	4,859	28.18%	✓
Progressive Conservative	Raymond Z. Bourque	4,524	26.24%	✓
Liberal	Allan d'Entremont	4,067	23.59%	
Liberal	Donald J. Fraser	3,790	21.98%	
Total		17,240	–	
Source(s) Source: Nova Scotia Legislature (2024). "Electoral History for Yarmouth" (PDF). nslegislature.ca. Nova Scotia Legislature (1953). Legislature of Nova Scotia Election Returns (PDF). Queen's Printer. Archived from the original (PDF) on 10 September 2018.

=== 1949 ===
1949 Nova Scotia general election
Party	Candidate	Votes	%	Elected
Progressive Conservative	William Heartz Brown	5,322	28.20%	✓
Liberal	Donald J. Fraser	4,751	25.18%	✓
Liberal	Joseph Israel Pothier	4,601	24.38%	
Progressive Conservative	Alfred B. d'Entremont	4,197	22.24%	
Total		18,871	–	
Source(s) Source: Nova Scotia Legislature (2024). "Electoral History for Yarmouth" (PDF). nslegislature.ca. Nova Scotia Legislature (1949). Legislature of Nova Scotia Election Returns (PDF). Queen's Printer. Archived from the original (PDF) on 10 September 2018.

=== 1945 ===
1945 Nova Scotia general election
Party	Candidate	Votes	%	±%
Liberal	Henry A. Waterman	5,000	55.20%	-7.82%
Liberal-Conservative	Frank Parker Day	4,058	44.80%	7.82%
Total		9,058	–	
Source(s) Source: Nova Scotia Legislature (2021). "Electoral History for Yarmouth" (PDF). nslegislature.ca.

=== 1937 ===
1937 Nova Scotia general election
Party	Candidate	Votes	%	±%
Liberal	Lindsay C. Gardner	5,566	60.11%	-1.40%
Liberal-Conservative	Peter Lorimer Judge	3,694	39.89%	1.40%
Total		9,260	–	
Source(s) Source: Nova Scotia Legislature (2021). "Electoral History for Yarmouth" (PDF). nslegislature.ca.

=== 1941 ===
1941 Nova Scotia general election
Party	Candidate	Votes	%	±%
Liberal	Henry A. Waterman	4,551	63.02%	2.92%
Liberal-Conservative	Peter Lorimer Judge	2,670	36.98%	-2.92%
Total		7,221	–	
Source(s) Source: Nova Scotia Legislature (2021). "Electoral History for Yarmouth" (PDF). nslegislature.ca.

=== 1933 ===
1933 Nova Scotia general election
Party	Candidate	Votes	%
Liberal	Lindsay C. Gardner	5,826	61.51%
Liberal-Conservative	Alvin L. Chipman	3,646	38.49%
Total		9,472	–
Source(s) Source: Nova Scotia Legislature (2021). "Electoral History for Yarmouth" (PDF). nslegislature.ca.

=== 1928 ===
1928 Nova Scotia general election
Party	Candidate	Votes	%	Elected
Liberal	Lindsay C. Gardner	4,141	27.41	✓
Liberal	René W.E. Landry	4,016	26.58	✓
Liberal-Conservative	John Flint Cahan	3,666	24.26	
Liberal-Conservative	Raymond Neri d'Entremont	3,286	21.75	
Total		15,109	–	
Source(s) Source: Nova Scotia Legislature (2024). "Electoral History for Yarmouth" (PDF). nslegislature.ca.

=== 1925 ===
1925 Nova Scotia general election
Party	Candidate	Votes	%	Elected
Liberal-Conservative	John Flint Cahan	3,852	28.79	✓
Liberal-Conservative	Raymond Neri d'Entremont	3,415	25.53	✓
Liberal	René W.E. Landry	3,079	23.02	
Liberal	Lindsay C. Gardner	3,032	22.66	
Total		13,378	–	
Source(s) Source: Nova Scotia Legislature (2024). "Electoral History for Yarmouth" (PDF). nslegislature.ca.

=== 1920 ===
1920 Nova Scotia general election
Party	Candidate	Votes	%	Elected
Liberal-Conservative	Howard Corning	3,416	35.31	✓
Liberal	Amédée Melanson	3,207	33.15	✓
Liberal	Ernest Howard Armstrong	3,052	31.55	
Total		9,675	–	
Source(s) Source: Nova Scotia Legislature (2024). "Electoral History for Yarmouth" (PDF). nslegislature.ca.

=== 1916 ===
1916 Nova Scotia general election
Party	Candidate	Votes	%	Elected
Liberal	Ernest Howard Armstrong	1,931	28.36	✓
Liberal	Henry d'Entremont	1,839	27.00	✓
Liberal-Conservative	Howard Corning	1,736	25.49	
Liberal-Conservative	Joseph O. d'Eon	1,304	19.15	
Total		6,810	–	
Source(s) Source: Nova Scotia Legislature (2024). "Electoral History for Yarmouth" (PDF). nslegislature.ca.

=== 1911 by-election ===
Nova Scotia provincial by-election, 1911-08-16
Party	Candidate	Votes	%	Elected
Liberal	Ernest Howard Armstrong	1,980	61.88	✓
Liberal-Conservative	James G. d'Entremont	1,220	38.13	
Total		3,200	–	
Source(s) Source: Nova Scotia Legislature (2024). "Electoral History for Yarmouth" (PDF). nslegislature.ca.

=== 1911 ===
1911 Nova Scotia general election
Party	Candidate	Votes	%	Elected
Liberal	Ernest Howard Armstrong	1,665	28.02	✓
Liberal-Conservative	Howard Corning	1,583	26.64	✓
Liberal	Henry S. LeBlanc	1,514	25.48	
Liberal-Conservative	James G. d'Entremont	1,180	19.86	
Total		5,942	–	
Source(s) Source: Nova Scotia Legislature (2024). "Electoral History for Yarmouth" (PDF). nslegislature.ca.

=== 1906 ===
1906 Nova Scotia general election
Party	Candidate	Votes	%	Elected
Liberal	Ernest Howard Armstrong	1,586	34.20	✓
Liberal	Henry S. LeBlanc	1,425	30.72	✓
Liberal-Conservative	A. M. Perrin	815	17.57	
Liberal-Conservative	Raymond Neri d'Entremont	812	17.51	
Total		4,638	–	
Source(s) Source: Nova Scotia Legislature (2024). "Electoral History for Yarmouth" (PDF). nslegislature.ca.

=== 1904 by-election ===
Nova Scotia provincial by-election, 1904-01-05
Party	Candidate	Votes	%	Elected
Liberal	George G. Sanderson	Acclaimed	N/A	✓
Total			–	
Source(s) Source: Nova Scotia Legislature (2024). "Electoral History for Yarmouth" (PDF). nslegislature.ca.

=== 1901 ===
1901 Nova Scotia general election
Party	Candidate	Votes	%	Elected
Liberal	Henry S. LeBlanc	Acclaimed	N/A	✓
Liberal	Augustus Stoneman	Acclaimed	N/A	✓
Total			–	
Source(s) Source: Nova Scotia Legislature (2024). "Electoral History for Yarmouth" (PDF). nslegislature.ca.

=== 1900 by-election ===
Nova Scotia provincial by-election, 1900-05-15
Party	Candidate	Votes	%	Elected
Liberal	Augustus Stoneman	Acclaimed	N/A	✓
Total			–	
Source(s) Source: Nova Scotia Legislature (2024). "Electoral History for Yarmouth" (PDF). nslegislature.ca.

=== 1897 ===
1897 Nova Scotia general election
Party	Candidate	Votes	%	Elected
Liberal	William Law	1,501	29.14	✓
Liberal	Henry S. LeBlanc	1,473	28.60	✓
Liberal-Conservative	Joseph R. Wyman	958	18.60	
Liberal-Conservative	Albert A. Pothier	614	11.92	
Prohibitionist-Temperance	E. C. Simonson	605	11.75	
Total		5,151	–	
Source(s) Source: Nova Scotia Legislature (2024). "Electoral History for Yarmouth" (PDF). nslegislature.ca.

=== 1894 ===
1894 Nova Scotia general election
Party	Candidate	Votes	%	Elected
Liberal	William Law	1,464	31.78	✓
Liberal-Conservative	Albert A. Pothier	1,147	24.90	✓
Liberal	Cornelius Forman Hatfield	1,097	23.81	
Prohibitionist-Temperance	E. C. Simonson	899	19.51	
Total		4,607	–	
Source(s) Source: Nova Scotia Legislature (2024). "Electoral History for Yarmouth" (PDF). nslegislature.ca.

=== 1890 by-election ===
Nova Scotia provincial by-election, 1890-12-11
Party	Candidate	Votes	%	Elected
Liberal	Cornelius Forman Hatfield	1,456	71.72	✓
Liberal-Conservative	A. P. Landry	574	28.28	
Total		2,030	–	
Source(s) Source: Nova Scotia Legislature (2024). "Electoral History for Yarmouth" (PDF). nslegislature.ca.

=== 1890 ===
1890 Nova Scotia general election
Party	Candidate	Votes	%	Elected
Liberal	William Law	1,487	31.48	✓
Liberal	Albert Gayton	1,473	31.19	✓
Liberal-Conservative	M. d'Entremont	962	20.37	
Liberal-Conservative	Jacob Bingay	801	16.96	
Total		4,723	–	
Source(s) Source: Nova Scotia Legislature (2024). "Electoral History for Yarmouth" (PDF). nslegislature.ca.

=== 1886 ===
1886 Nova Scotia general election
Party	Candidate	Votes	%	Elected
Liberal	William Law	1,745	41.88	✓
Liberal	Albert Gayton	1,643	39.43	✓
Liberal-Conservative	Thomas Corning	779	18.69	
Total		4,167	–	
Source(s) Source: Nova Scotia Legislature (2024). "Electoral History for Yarmouth" (PDF). nslegislature.ca.

=== 1882 ===
Nova Scotia provincial by-election, 1882-08-22
Party	Candidate	Votes	%	Elected
Liberal	Albert Gayton	Acclaimed	N/A	✓
Total			–	
Source(s) Source: Nova Scotia Legislature (2024). "Electoral History for Yarmouth" (PDF). nslegislature.ca.

=== 1882 ===
1882 Nova Scotia general election
Party	Candidate	Votes	%	Elected
Liberal	Albert Gayton	1,344	39.26	✓
Liberal-Conservative	Thomas Corning	1,203	35.14	✓
Liberal	Thomas Barnard Flint	876	25.59	
Total		3,423	–	
Source(s) Source: Nova Scotia Legislature (2024). "Electoral History for Yarmouth" (PDF). nslegislature.ca.

=== 1878 ===
1878 Nova Scotia general election
Party	Candidate	Votes	%	Elected
Liberal	Albert Gayton	1,086	29.22	✓
Independent	Joseph Robbins Kinney	1,000	26.91	✓
Liberal-Conservative	Bowman Corning	669	18.00	
Liberal	A. S. Lent	491	13.21	
Independent	W. V. Brown	470	12.65	
Total		3,716	–	
Source(s) Source: Nova Scotia Legislature (2024). "Electoral History for Yarmouth" (PDF). nslegislature.ca.

=== 1874 ===
1874 Nova Scotia general election
Party	Candidate	Votes	%	Elected
Liberal	Albert Gayton	1,641	45.70	✓
Liberal	John Lovitt	1,211	33.72	✓
Liberal	John K. Ryerson	739	20.58	
Total		3,591	–	
Source(s) Source: Nova Scotia Legislature (2024). "Electoral History for Yarmouth" (PDF). nslegislature.ca.

=== 1872 by-election ===
Nova Scotia provincial by-election, 1872
Party	Candidate	Votes	%	Elected
Liberal	John K. Ryerson	1,005	50.02	✓
Liberal-Conservative	Thomas Barnard Flint	1,004	49.98	
Total		2,009	–	
Source(s) Source: Nova Scotia Legislature (2024). "Electoral History for Yarmouth" (PDF). nslegislature.ca.

=== 1871 ===
1871 Nova Scotia general election
Party	Candidate	Votes	%	Elected
Liberal	Albert Gayton	714	25.71	✓
Liberal	William H. Townsend	659	23.73	✓
Liberal	John K. Ryerson	636	22.90	
Liberal-Conservative	John Van Norden Hatfield	397	14.30	
Liberal-Conservative	N. Churchill	371	13.36	
Total		2,777	–	
Source(s) Source: Nova Scotia Legislature (2024). "Electoral History for Yarmouth" (PDF). nslegislature.ca.

=== 1867 ===
1867 Nova Scotia general election
Party	Candidate	Votes	%	Elected
Anti-Confederation	John K. Ryerson	1,138	32.53	✓
Anti-Confederation	William H. Townsend	853	24.39	✓
Anti-Confederation	Walter G. Goucher	726	20.75	
Confederation	John Van Norden Hatfield	626	17.90	
Confederation	J. Smith Hatfield	94	2.69	
Confederation	Isaac Hatfield	61	1.74	
Total		3,498	–	
Source(s) Source: Nova Scotia Legislature (2024). "Electoral History for Yarmouth" (PDF). nslegislature.ca.

== See also ==
- List of Nova Scotia provincial electoral districts
- Canadian provincial electoral districts
