= William Heartz Brown =

Canadian politician (1883–1967)

William H. Brown

MLA for Yarmouth
- In office 1949–1956
- Preceded by: Henry A. Waterman
- Succeeded by: Willard O'Brien; Eric Spinney

Personal details
- Born: February 25, 1883 Yarmouth, Nova Scotia
- Died: May 24, 1967 (aged 84) Yarmouth, Nova Scotia
- Party: Progressive Conservative

William Heartz Brown (February 25, 1883 – May 24, 1967) was a Canadian politician. He represented the electoral district of Yarmouth in the Nova Scotia House of Assembly from 1949 to 1956. He was a member of the Progressive Conservative Party of Nova Scotia.

Brown was born in 1883 at Yarmouth, Nova Scotia. He married Etta May, and was employed as a superintendent at a textile plant. He served on town council in Yarmouth from 1948 to 1952. Brown entered provincial politics in the 1949 election, winning the dual-member Yarmouth riding with Liberal Donald J. Fraser. He was re-elected in the 1953 election, serving with Progressive Conservative Raymond Z. Bourque. Both Brown and Bourque were defeated when they ran for re-election in 1956, losing to Liberals Willard O'Brien and Eric Spinney. Brown died at Yarmouth on May 24, 1967.
