= George G. Sanderson =

Canadian politician (1840–1919)

MLA for Yarmouth County
- In office 1904–1906
- Preceded by: Augustus Stoneman
- Succeeded by: Ernest Howard Armstrong

Personal details
- Born: March 5, 1840 Yarmouth, Nova Scotia
- Died: May 27, 1919 (aged 79) Yarmouth, Nova Scotia
- Party: Liberal
- Spouse: Frances Manning
- Occupation: insurance broker, shipowner, politician

George Goudey Sanderson (March 5, 1840 – May 27, 1919) was an insurance broker, prominent shipowner and political figure in Nova Scotia, Canada. He represented Yarmouth County in the Nova Scotia House of Assembly from 1904 to 1906 as a Liberal member. He died on May 27, 1919, from exhaustion following rheumatoid arthritis.
