= William Law (Canadian politician) =

Canadian politician (1833–1901)

MLA for Yarmouth County
- In office 1886–1900
- Preceded by: Thomas Corning
- Succeeded by: Augustus Stoneman

Personal details
- Born: August 5, 1833 Belfast, Ireland
- Died: November 21, 1901 (aged 68) Yarmouth, Nova Scotia
- Party: Liberal
- Spouse: Mary Brown
- Occupation: merchant

William Law (August 5, 1833 – November 21, 1901) was a merchant and political figure in Nova Scotia, Canada. He represented Yarmouth County in the Nova Scotia House of Assembly from 1886 to 1900 as a Liberal member.

He was born in Belfast, Ireland and came to Yarmouth, Nova Scotia in October 1847. Two years later, Law moved to Oxford, Massachusetts; he returned to Yarmouth in 1855. In 1854, he married Mary A. Brown. With Brown he had a son Bowman Brown Law. His firm, William Law and Company was involved in shipping and insurance. Law also served as a justice of the peace. He married Annie T. Gilman in 1900 after the death of his first wife. He was named to the province's Legislative Council in 1901 and served until his death later that year in Yarmouth.
