= Raymond Neri d'Entremont =

Canadian politician (1875–1974)

Raymond d'Entremont

MLA for Yarmouth County
- In office 1925–1928
- Preceded by: Amédée Melanson
- Succeeded by: Rene W. E. Landry

Personal details
- Born: August 29, 1875 West Pubnico, Nova Scotia
- Died: January 26, 1974 (aged 98) Waterville, Nova Scotia
- Party: Liberal-Conservative
- Spouse: Sadie d'Entremont
- Occupation: fish merchant

Raymond Neri d'Entremont (August 29, 1875 – January 26, 1974) was a fish merchant and political figure in Nova Scotia, Canada. He represented Yarmouth County in the Nova Scotia House of Assembly from 1925 to 1928 as a Liberal-Conservative member.

== Early life and education ==
He was born in West Pubnico, Nova Scotia, the son of François Xavier Isaïe d'Entremont and Natalie Pothier, and was educated at St. Anne's College.

== Death ==
He died at Waterville in Kings County at the age of 98.

== Personal life ==
He married Sadie M. d'Entremont in 1907.
