= Hectanooga =

Community in Nova Scotia, Canada

Coordinates: 44°5′34.17″N 66°1′44.06″W

Hectanooga in Nova Scotia

Hectanooga is a community in the Canadian province of Nova Scotia, located in Digby County. The name of the community is derived from a Mi'kmaq word; according to Place-Names and Places of Nova Scotia, this name was given to the area by "the daughter of an ex-Governor".

In 1956, Hectanooga had a population of 118 people.
