= Edward D. MacArthur =

Canadian politician

MLA for Kings West
- In office 1960–1963
- Preceded by: Hiram Thomas
- Succeeded by: Paul Kinsman

Personal details
- Born: February 7, 1920 Pictou, Nova Scotia
- Died: June 29, 1986 (aged 66)
- Party: Liberal
- Occupation: physician

Edward Donald MacArthur (February 7, 1920 – June 29, 1986) was a Canadian politician. He represented the electoral district of Kings West in the Nova Scotia House of Assembly from 1960 to 1963. He was a member of the Nova Scotia Liberal Party.

MacArthur was born in 1920 at Pictou, Nova Scotia. He was educated at Dalhousie University, and was a physician by career. MacArthur entered provincial politics in the 1960 election, winning the Kings West riding by 512 votes. He was defeated by Progressive Conservative Paul Kinsman when he ran for re-election in 1963. MacArthur died in 1986.
