= Fraser Mooney =

Canadian politician

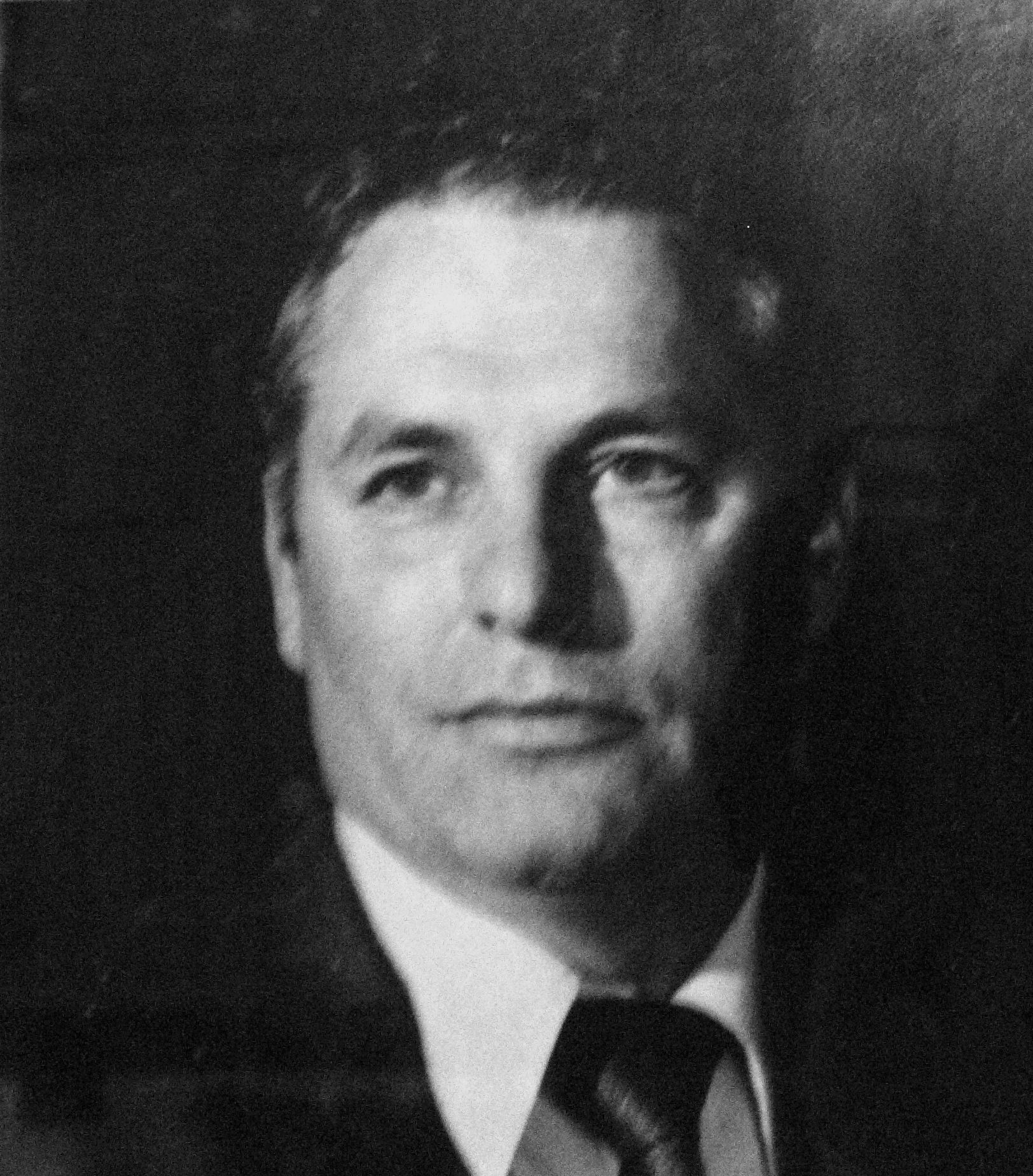

MLA for Yarmouth County (1970-1981) Yarmouth (1981-1984)
- Preceded by: Benoit Robichaud
- Succeeded by: Alex McIntosh

MLA for Yarmouth County

Personal details
- Born: Joseph Fraser Mooney; February 24, 1927 Glace Bay, Nova Scotia
- Died: January 5, 2006 (aged 78) Yarmouth, Nova Scotia
- Party: Liberal
- Occupation: Pharmacist, businessman

Joseph Fraser Mooney (February 24, 1927 – January 5, 2006) was a Canadian politician. He represented the electoral district of Yarmouth in the Nova Scotia House of Assembly from 1970 to 1984. He was a member of the Nova Scotia Liberal Party.

== Early life and education ==
Born in 1927 at Glace Bay, Nova Scotia, Mooney was a graduate of St. Francis Xavier University and Dalhousie University.

== Career ==
A pharmacist by career, Mooney owned and operated City Drug Store in downtown Yarmouth, Nova Scotia for over 50 years.

== Politics ==
Mooney served on Yarmouth town council from 1957 to 1965. He attempted to enter provincial politics in the 1967 election, but was defeated. He ran again in the 1970 election, and was elected with Progressive Conservative George Snow in the dual-member Yarmouth County riding. He was re-elected in the 1974 and 1978 elections.

In November 1971, Mooney was appointed to the Executive Council of Nova Scotia as Minister of Municipal Affairs. In September 1972, he was given additional roles in cabinet as Minister of Tourism, and Minister responsible for the Liquor Control Act. In an August 1973 cabinet shuffle, Mooney left the tourism ministry but kept the Municipal Affairs portfolio, as well as responsibility for the Liquor Control Act.

In February 1976, Mooney was shuffled to Minister of Highways, where he remained until the Liberal government was defeated in 1978. In June 1980, Mooney ran for the leadership of the Nova Scotia Liberal Party, finishing third at the convention that elected Sandy Cameron the new leader.

Mooney was re-elected in the new single-member riding of Yarmouth in the 1981 election, defeating former Progressive Conservative MLA Benoit Robichaud by 479 votes. In the 1984 election, Mooney was defeated by Progressive Conservative Alex McIntosh.

Mooney tried to win back the Yarmouth seat in the 1988 election, but was defeated by Progressive Conservative Leroy Legere. Mooney made another political comeback attempt in 1994, when he challenged incumbent Charles Crosby for the mayor's seat in Yarmouth.

On January 5, 2006, aged 78, Mooney died at his home in Yarmouth.
