= Charles P. Bissett =

Canadian politician

Charles Parker Bissett (June 25, 1866 – November 18, 1916) was a physician and political figure in Nova Scotia, Canada. He represented Richmond County in the Nova Scotia House of Assembly from 1904 to 1916 as a Liberal member.

He was born in River Bourgeois, Richmond County, Nova Scotia, the son of George Henry Bissett and Virginia Boudreau. He was educated at the Pictou Academy and McGill University. In 1896, he married Emma M. Cameron. Bissett was a member of the provincial Medical Board and served as physician to the Department of Marine and Indian Affairs. He was first elected to the provincial assembly in a 1904 by-election held after Duncan Finlayson was elected to the House of Commons. Bissett died in St. Peter's, Nova Scotia at the age of 50.
