= Richard Donahoe =

Canadian politician

The Honourable Richard Alphonsus Donahoe QC

Senator for Halifax, Nova Scotia
- In office 1979–1984
- Appointed by: Joe Clark

Personal details
- Born: September 27, 1909 Halifax, Nova Scotia
- Died: April 25, 2000 (aged 90)
- Party: Progressive Conservative

Richard Alphonsus Donahoe, Q.C., K.S.G. (September 27, 1909 – April 25, 2000) was a Canadian lawyer and politician.

Born in Halifax, Nova Scotia, the son of James Donahoe and Rebecca Duggan, he was educated at Saint Mary's University and Dalhousie University and set up practice in Halifax. In 1936, he married Mary Boyd. Donahoe ran unsuccessfully for the House of Commons of Canada as the National Government candidate in the riding of Halifax in 1940 federal election. In 1951, he was elected an alderman on the Halifax City Council. He was elected mayor in 1952 and was acclaimed in 1953 and 1954.

He was elected to the Nova Scotia House of Assembly in a 1954 by-election held after the death of Angus L. Macdonald and was re-elected four times in 1956, 1960, 1963 and 1967. He was the Attorney General and Minister of Public Health in the cabinets of Robert Stanfield and George Isaac Smith. Donahoe helped implement the Medical Insurance Program in Nova Scotia. He was defeated when he ran for reelection in 1970 and returned to his law practice.

In 1979, he was appointed to the Senate of Canada representing the senatorial division of Halifax, Nova Scotia. A Progressive Conservative, he served until his mandatory retirement at the age of 75 in 1984.

In 1969, Pope Paul VI made him a Knight of the Order of St. Gregory the Great.

His sons, Terry Donahoe and Art Donahoe were also Nova Scotia politicians.

He was president of the Canadian Curling Association from 1955 to 1956.
