= Willard O'Brien =

Canadian politician (1893–1981)

Willard C. O'Brien

MLA for Yarmouth County
- In office October 30, 1956 – October 8, 1963
- Preceded by: William H. Brown; Raymond Z. Bourque
- Succeeded by: George A. Snow

Personal details
- Born: December 15, 1893 Noel, Nova Scotia
- Died: November 6, 1981 (aged 87) Yarmouth, Nova Scotia
- Party: Liberal
- Spouse: Marguerite Murphy
- Occupation: physician, politician

Willard Cleveland O'Brien (December 15, 1893 – November 6, 1981) was a physician and political figure in Nova Scotia, Canada.

== Early life and education ==
Born in Noel, Nova Scotia, he graduated from Dalhousie Medical School in 1919.

== Political career ==
He served as the mayor of Wedgeport, Nova Scotia from 1936 to 1942 and he represented Yarmouth County in the Nova Scotia House of Assembly from 1956 to 1963 as a Liberal member. He ran for reelection in 1963 but lost by 165 votes to George A. Burridge.

== Personal life ==
He was married to Marguerite (Murphy), sister of Walter Murphy, who served as the last mayor of Wedgeport.
