= Augustus Stoneman =

Canadian politician (1832–1905)

MLA for Yarmouth County
- In office 1900–1903
- Preceded by: William Law
- Succeeded by: George Sanderson

Personal details
- Born: April 2, 1832 Yarmouth, Nova Scotia
- Died: April 10, 1905 (aged 73) Yarmouth, Nova Scotia
- Party: Liberal
- Spouse: Maria Richan
- Occupation: Merchant

Augustus Frederick Stoneman (April 2, 1832 – April 10, 1905) was a merchant and political figure in Nova Scotia, Canada. He represented Yarmouth County in the Nova Scotia House of Assembly from 1900 to 1903 as a Liberal member.

He was born in Yarmouth, Nova Scotia, the son of Joseph Stoneman and Mary Lewis. In 1859, he married Maria D. Richan. Stoneman was a justice of the peace and served as mayor of Yarmouth in 1899. Stoneman was elected to the provincial assembly in a 1900 by-election held after William Law resigned his seat. He was named to the province's Legislative Council in 1903 and served until his death in Yarmouth at the age of 73.
