= Charles F. Cooper (politician) =

Canadian politician

Charles Frederick Cooper

MLA for Queens County
- In office 1901 to 1911

Personal details
- Born: January 3, 1852 Birmingham, England
- Died: March 11, 1919 (aged 67) Halifax County, Nova Scotia
- Party: Liberal Party of Nova Scotia

Charles Frederick Cooper (January 3, 1852 – March 11, 1919) was an English-born Free Baptist clergyman and political figure in Nova Scotia, Canada. He represented Queens County in the Nova Scotia House of Assembly from 1901 to 1911 as a Liberal member.

He was born in Birmingham, the son of John Cooper, and educated there and in London. In 1899, he married Alverotta Ophelia Hilton. Cooper lived in Caledonia Corner in Queens County and Halifax. He died in 1919.
