= Ste. Anne du Ruisseau, Nova Scotia =

Community in Nova Scotia, Canada

Coordinates: 43°50′15″N 65°56′3″W

Ste-Anne-du-Ruisseau in Nova Scotia

Ste-Anne-du-Ruisseau is a community in the Canadian province of Nova Scotia, located in Yarmouth County.

== Name ==
Originally known as "Eel Brook", an English translation of the Mi'kmaq name for this place which was "Wiplomesgokum", meaning "place of eels, but they were poor and lean". The name was changed in the 1950s to reflect the name of the local parish, Sainte-Anne. Ruisseau is a French word meaning "a small brook."

== History ==
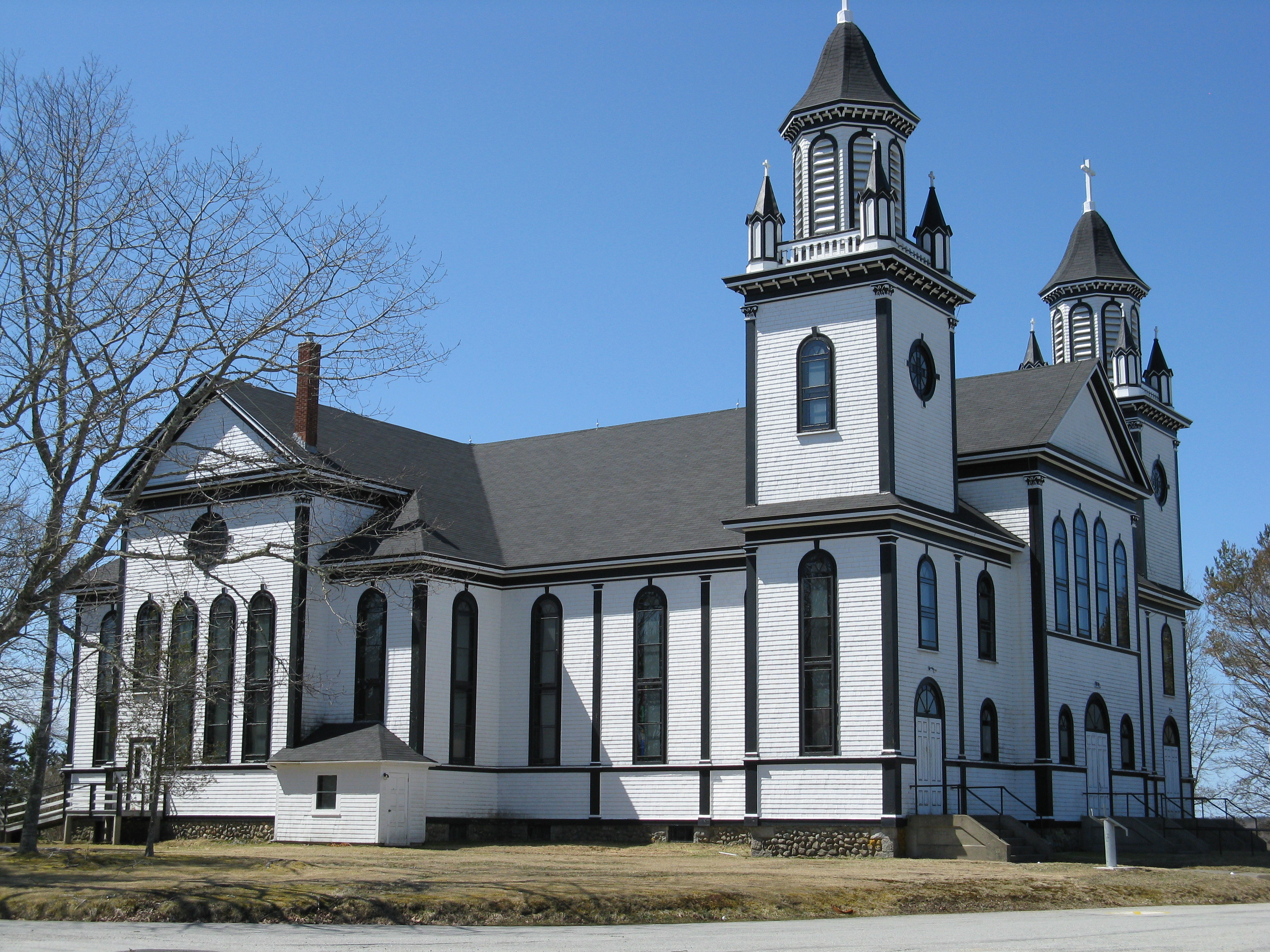
Catholic church in Ste. Anne du Ruisseau

The village was settled in 1767 by Acadians who escaped deportation and those who returned to Nova Scotia from exile. The original settlement was in an area now called Pointe-à-Rocco, where the initial settlers built a chapel and a few homes. The first Roman Catholic church in Yarmouth County was built in the community in 1784. It was replaced by a larger church in 1808, but this church was destroyed by fire on March 23, 1900. A new church was built the same year. A replica of the original chapel was built to commemorate the early settlement. The parish of Sainte-Anne is the oldest Acadian parish in Nova Scotia.

Four families are considered to be the first settlers here, who leased 1,193 acres (483 ha) from a Rev. Breyton in 1773. The families were headed by Pierre LeBlanc (a descendant of Daniel Leblanc), brothers Louis and Pierre Mius (descendants of Philippe Mius d'Entremont), and Pierre II Surette.

The first church built in the community was erected in 1767. Sainte-Anne du Ruisseau became the first Catholic parish in Yarmouth County, founded in 1799 by Father Jean Mandé Sigogne. In 1808, the old church was replaced to serve a growing population. The present church was erected in 1900, replacing the earlier structure which had burned. It is a municipally designated heritage building. Striking in appearance, it was built in Romanesque style and features two towers and original paintings on the ceiling and sanctuary walls.
