= Joseph A. Bancroft =

Canadian politician

Joseph Austin Bancroft (ca 1842 – January 23, 1917) was a farmer and political figure in Nova Scotia, Canada. He represented Annapolis County in the Nova Scotia House of Assembly from 1894 to 1911 as a Liberal member.

He was born in Paradise, Nova Scotia. He served as registrar of deeds from 1911 to 1917. Bancroft died at Round Hill, Nova Scotia.
