= George A. Burridge =

Canadian politician (1883–1969)

Dr. George A. Burridge

MLA for Yarmouth County
- In office 1960–1967
- Preceded by: Eric Spinney
- Succeeded by: Benoit Robichaud

Personal details
- Born: September 20, 1883 Hectanooga, Nova Scotia
- Died: March 11, 1969 (aged 85) Yarmouth, Nova Scotia
- Party: Progressive Conservative
- Spouse: Charlotte
- Occupation: teacher, politician

George Adrien Burridge (September 20, 1883 – March 11, 1969) was a teacher and political figure in Nova Scotia, Canada. He represented Yarmouth County in the Nova Scotia House of Assembly from 1960 to 1967 as a Progressive Conservative member.

== Early life ==
Born in Hectanooga, Nova Scotia, he was the son of Ambroise Burridge and Rosalie Cottreau.

== Before politics ==
He was the first principal of the Yarmouth Vocational School, the original public vocational training school in Nova Scotia.

== Political career ==
In October 1960, he was appointed to the Executive Council of Nova Scotia as Minister without portfolio.

== Posthumous ==
The current NSCC Burridge Campus in Yarmouth is named after him.
