= Moses J. Doucet =

Canadian politician

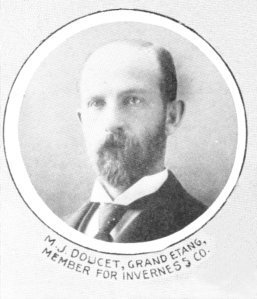
Moses J. Doucet

Moses J. Doucet (February 19, 1862 – July 29, 1906) was a merchant and political figure in Nova Scotia, Canada. He represented Inverness County in the Nova Scotia House of Assembly from 1897 to 1906 as a Liberal member. His surname also appears as Doucette in some sources.

He was of Acadian origin, the son of Magloire Doucet and Sophie Broussard. Doucet was married twice: to Eliza J. Coody in 1885 and to Harriet Ann LeBlanc, the daughter of Anselm LeBlanc, in 1891. He served on the council for Inverness County from 1889 to 1896. Doucet lived in Arichat.
