= Neil J. Gillis =

Canadian politician (1869–1939)

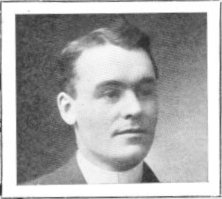
Neil J. Gillis

Neil Joseph Gillis (December 8, 1869 – March 15, 1939) was a merchant, insurance broker and political figure in Nova Scotia, Canada. He represented Cape Breton County in the Nova Scotia House of Assembly from 1900 to 1911 as a Liberal member.

== Biography ==
He was born in Victoria County, Nova Scotia, the son of Hugh Gillis and Mary MacDonald. In 1891, he married Jennie McKinnon. Gillis was a Grand Master in the provincial Workmen's Association. He was named to the Legislative Council of Nova Scotia in 1916 and served until it was abolished in May 1928. Gillis served as a member of the Canadian Farm Loans Board until 1933 and then was a member of the Nova Scotia Land Settlement Board from 1933 to 1939. He died in Glace Bay at the age of 69.
