= Henry S. LeBlanc =

Canadian politician (1865–1946)

Henry LeBlanc
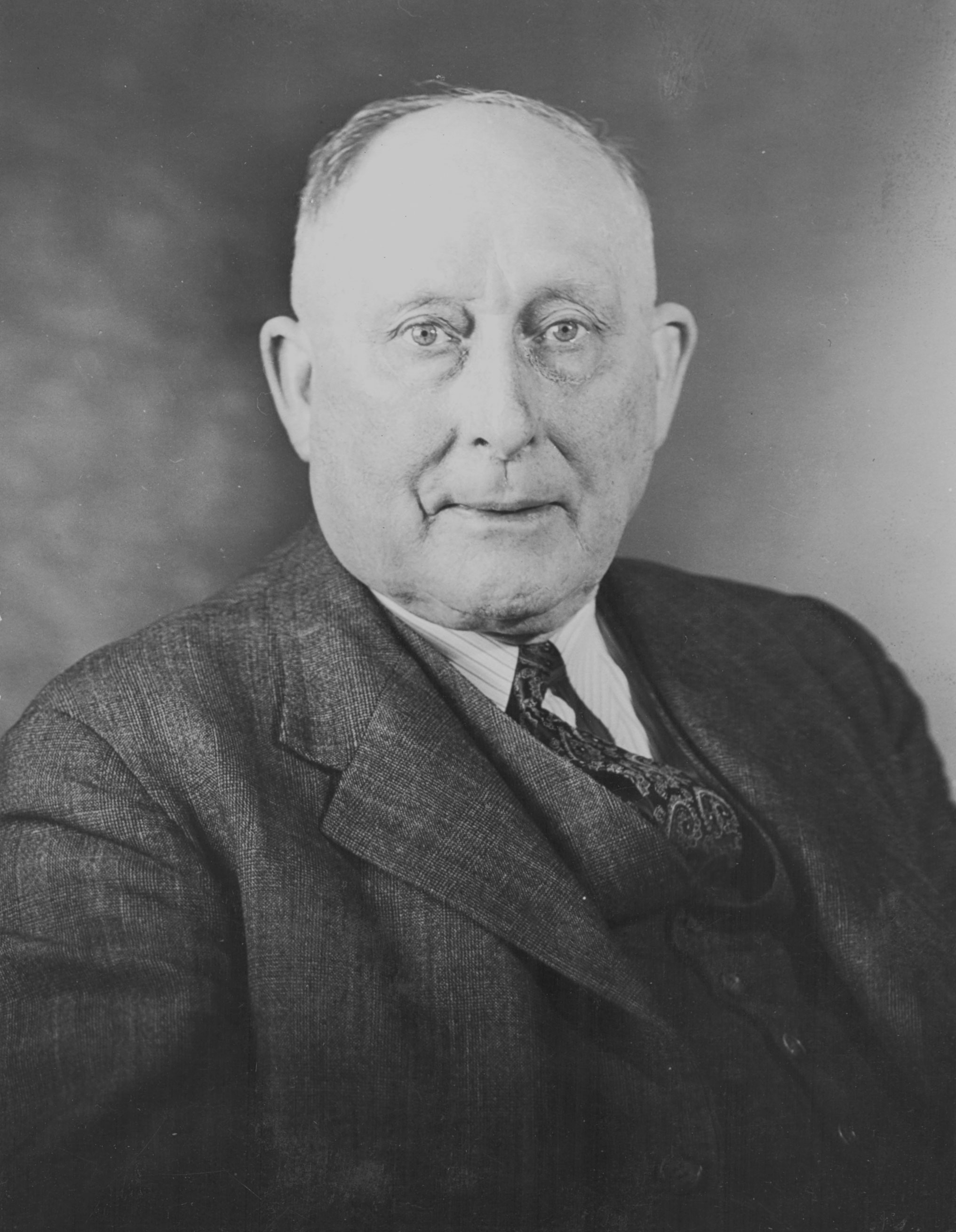

MLA for Yarmouth County
- In office 1897–1911
- Preceded by: Albert A. Pothier
- Succeeded by: Howard Corning

Personal details
- Born: September 4, 1865 East Pubnico, Nova Scotia
- Died: September 4, 1946 (aged 81) Yarmouth, Nova Scotia
- Party: Liberal
- Spouse(s): Agnes d'Entremont; Theresa d'Eon
- Occupation: fish merchant

Henry S. LeBlanc (September 4, 1865 – September 4, 1946) was a merchant and political figure in Nova Scotia, Canada. He represented Yarmouth County in the Nova Scotia House of Assembly from 1897 to 1911 as a Liberal member.

== Early life ==
He was born in East Pubnico, Nova Scotia, the son of Andrew LeBlanc and Marie Ann Pothier.

== Career ==
LeBlanc served as a member of the municipal council for Argyle. He was a member of the province's Executive Council from 1906 to 1911. He was named to the Legislative Council of Nova Scotia in 1920 and served until the Council was abolished in 1928. LeBlanc was Inspector of Old Age Pensions for Yarmouth County from 1933 until his death in 1946.

== Death ==
He died in Yarmouth on September 4, 1946, at the age of 81.

== Personal life ==
He was married twice: to Agnes d'Entremont in 1891 and later to Theresa A. d'Eon.
