= Earl Wallace Urquhart =

Canadian politician

The Honourable Earl Wallace Urquhart

Senator for Inverness-Richmond, Nova Scotia
- In office February 24, 1966 – August 17, 1971
- Appointed by: Lester B. Pearson

Member of the Nova Scotia House of Assembly for Richmond
- In office 1949–1963
- Preceded by: Lauchlin Daniel Currie
- Succeeded by: Gerald Doucet

Nova Scotia Opposition Leader
- In office 1960–1962
- Preceded by: Henry Hicks
- Succeeded by: Peter M. Nicholson

Personal details
- Born: 22 February 1921 West Bay, Nova Scotia, Canada
- Died: 17 August 1971 (aged 50) Canada
- Party: Liberal
- Other political affiliations: Nova Scotia Liberal Party
- Profession: lawyer

Earl Wallace Urquhart (February 22, 1921 – August 17, 1971) was a Canadian politician and lawyer.

== Early life ==
Urquhart was born in West Bay, Inverness County, Nova Scotia, Canada. Urquhart served in the Canadian Infantry Corps and the Royal Canadian Air Force during World War II.

== Political career ==
he was elected to the Nova Scotia House of Assembly for Richmond in a 1949 by-election held after Lauchlin Daniel Currie was named to the bench. He served as a member of the assembly from 1949 to 1963. From 1960 to 1962, he was the House Leader. He was Leader of the Nova Scotia Liberal Party from 1962 to 1965.

He was summoned to the Senate on February 24, 1966 on the recommendation of Lester B. Pearson. A Liberal, he represented the senatorial division of Inverness-Richmond in the province of Nova Scotia until his death at the age of 50.
