= Stephen T. Pyke =

Canadian politician (1916–1985)

Stephen Thomas Pyke (1916–1985) was a political figure in Nova Scotia, Canada. He represented Cumberland Centre in the Nova Scotia House of Assembly as a Progressive Conservative member from 1953 to 1968.

He was born in Springhill, Nova Scotia, the son of Ebenezer Pyke and Millicent Baggs. Pyke served in the Royal Canadian Air Force during World War II. In 1940, he married Eleanor Martin. They had five children: Charles, David, Stephen, Jerry, and Joanne. Pyke served in the province's Executive Council as Minister of Labour from 1956 to 1962 and as Minister of Highways from 1962 to 1968.

Stephen Pyke died in Dartmouth Nova Scotia in 1985.
