= Carleton L. MacMillan =

Canadian physician and politician

Carleton Lamont MacMillan, CM (April 18, 1903 – February 10, 1978) was a physician and political figure in Baddeck, Nova Scotia, Canada. He represented Victoria in the Nova Scotia House of Assembly from 1949 to 1967 as a Liberal member.

MacMillan was born in Goldboro, Nova Scotia. He was educated at Sydney Academy, Acadia University and Dalhousie Medical School. He set up practice in Baddeck. In 1972, he was named to the Order of Canada for a lifetime of service as a general practitioner and as a medical health officer in Nova Scotia.

MacMillan published Memoirs of a Cape Breton doctor in 1975.
