= George A. Snow =

Canadian politician (1923–2020)

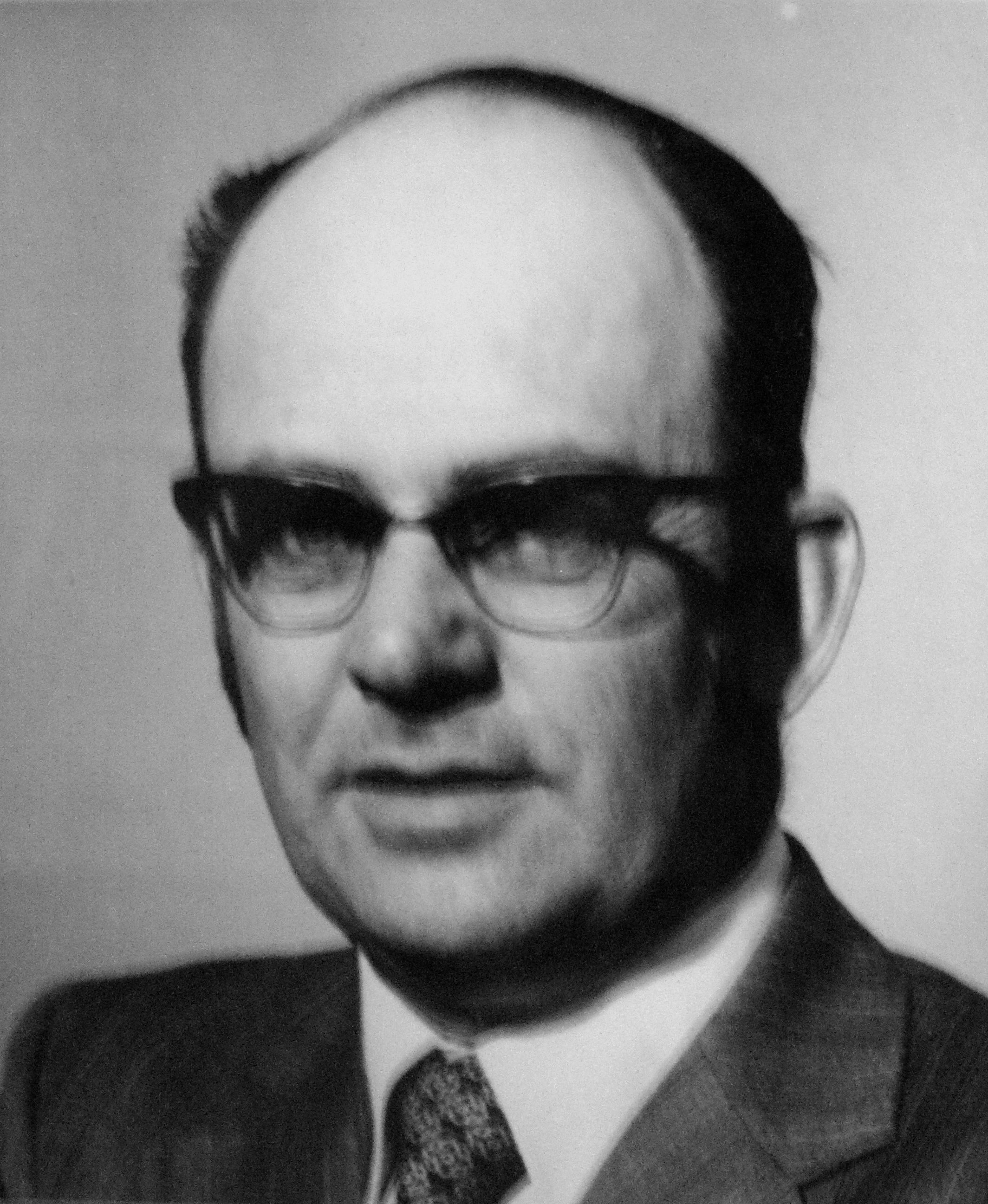

MLA for Yarmouth
- In office 1963–1974

Personal details
- Born: August 1, 1923 Port Maitland, Nova Scotia, Canada
- Died: April 7, 2020 (aged 96) Yarmouth, Nova Scotia, Canada
- Party: Progressive Conservative
- Occupation: lobster fisher

George Albert Snow (August 1, 1923 – April 7, 2020) was a Canadian politician. He represented the electoral district of Yarmouth in the Nova Scotia House of Assembly from 1963 to 1974. He was a member of the Nova Scotia Progressive Conservative Party. Snow was born in Port Maitland, Nova Scotia and was a lobster fisherman. He married Marjorie Louise Harris in 1947. Snow died of pneumonia in Yarmouth, Nova Scotia in 2020.
