= Michael Edwin Keefe =

Canadian politician

Michael Edwin Keefe (April 14, 1844 – June 28, 1933) was a building contractor and political figure in Nova Scotia, Canada. He represented Halifax County in the Nova Scotia House of Assembly from 1900 to 1906.

He was born in Halifax, the son of John Keefe, of Irish descent. Keefe served as mayor of Halifax from 1892 to 1895. He ran unsuccessfully for a seat in the House of Commons in 1896. He was first elected to the provincial assembly in a 1900 by-election and reelected in the general election which followed. He died in Halifax in 1933.

1896 Canadian federal election: Halifax
Party	Candidate	Votes	%	Elected
Conservative	Robert Borden	6,170	26.53	✓
Liberal	Benjamin Russell	5,997	25.79	✓
Conservative	Thomas Edward Kenny	5,616	24.15	
Liberal	Michael Edwin Keefe	5,472	23.53	
Total valid votes		23,255	100.00	
Source(s) "Halifax (1867- )". History of Federal Ridings Since 1867. Library of Parliament. Two members were elected from the district.
