= Bible Hill, Nova Scotia =

Village of Bible Hill Wi'kwampekwitk
- Village
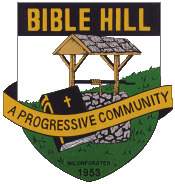
- Coat of arms
- Motto: Plant Your Roots
- Location of Bible Hill Village of Bible Hill (Canada)
- Coordinates: 45°22′32″N 63°15′37″W
- Country: Canada
- Province: Nova Scotia
- Municipality: Colchester County
- Founded: Early 1700s
- Incorporated: 1953

Government
  - Village Chair: Kevin Kennedy
  - Governing Body: Bible Hill Village Commission
  - MLA: David Ritcey
  - MP: Dr. Stephen Ellis (C)
- Highest elevation: 37 m (121 ft)
- Lowest elevation: 11 m (36 ft)

Population (2021)
  - Total: 5,076
- Time zone: UTC−04:00 (AST)
  - Summer (DST): UTC−03:00 (ADT)
- Postal code: B2N
- Area code: 902
- Telephone Exchanges: 893 ,897, 895
- NTS Map: 011E06
- GNBC Code: CACWS
- Website: www.biblehill.ca
- Part of a series about Places in Nova Scotia

Bible Hill (Mi'kmaq: Wi'kwampekwitk; Scottish Gaelic: Cnoc a' Bhìobaill) is a village in Colchester County, Nova Scotia, Canada. It lies on the north bank of the Salmon River, opposite the town of Truro and the community of Salmon River.

The village is home to Bible Hill Junior High School, Bible Hill Consolidated Elementary School, Colchester Christian Academy, and the Dalhousie University Faculty of Agriculture.

The Bible Hill Estates Trailer Park has been used as a filming location for the Trailer Park Boys television series service as the Sunnyvale Trailer Park.

== History ==
The name Bible Hill is derived from a prominent hill which rises above the flood plain on the grounds of the Dalhousie University Faculty of Agriculture (formerly the Nova Scotia Agricultural College) on the northern bank of the Salmon River.

It was believed that the hill took its name from Matthew Archibald (1745–1820), the son of one of the first Irish settlers in the area. He was locally renowned for his piety and extensive use of the Bible. It was thought that the name of the hill on which he lived came from his use of the Bible. It is suggested that name stuck when Joseph Howe coined the term on one of his visits to this house on the hill. Contrary to this long-standing legend, the origin of the name is currently believed to have come from the work of Rev. Dr. William McCullough (1811–1895) several years later.

Coincidentally, McCullough lived in the house built by Matthew Archibald many years earlier. He was the minister of Truro's First Presbyterian church (now First United Church) from 1839 to 1885, and had inherited an interest in Bible distribution from his father, Dr. Thomas McCullough, one of the founders of the Nova Scotia Bible Society. He distributed Bibles, free of charge, to anyone who wanted one. Over the almost 50 years of Rev. McCullough's ministry, the hill on which he lived, where one could obtain a Bible free of charge, became known as Bible Hill.

== Demographics ==
In the 2021 Census of Population conducted by Statistics Canada, Bible Hill had a population of 5,076 living in 2,374 of its 2,472 total private dwellings, a change of 3.7% from its 2016 population of 4,894. With a land area of 9.24 km^{2} (3.57 sq mi), it had a population density of 549.4/km^{2} (1,422.8/sq mi) in 2021.
