= Langille Athletic Centre =

Canadian athletics facility

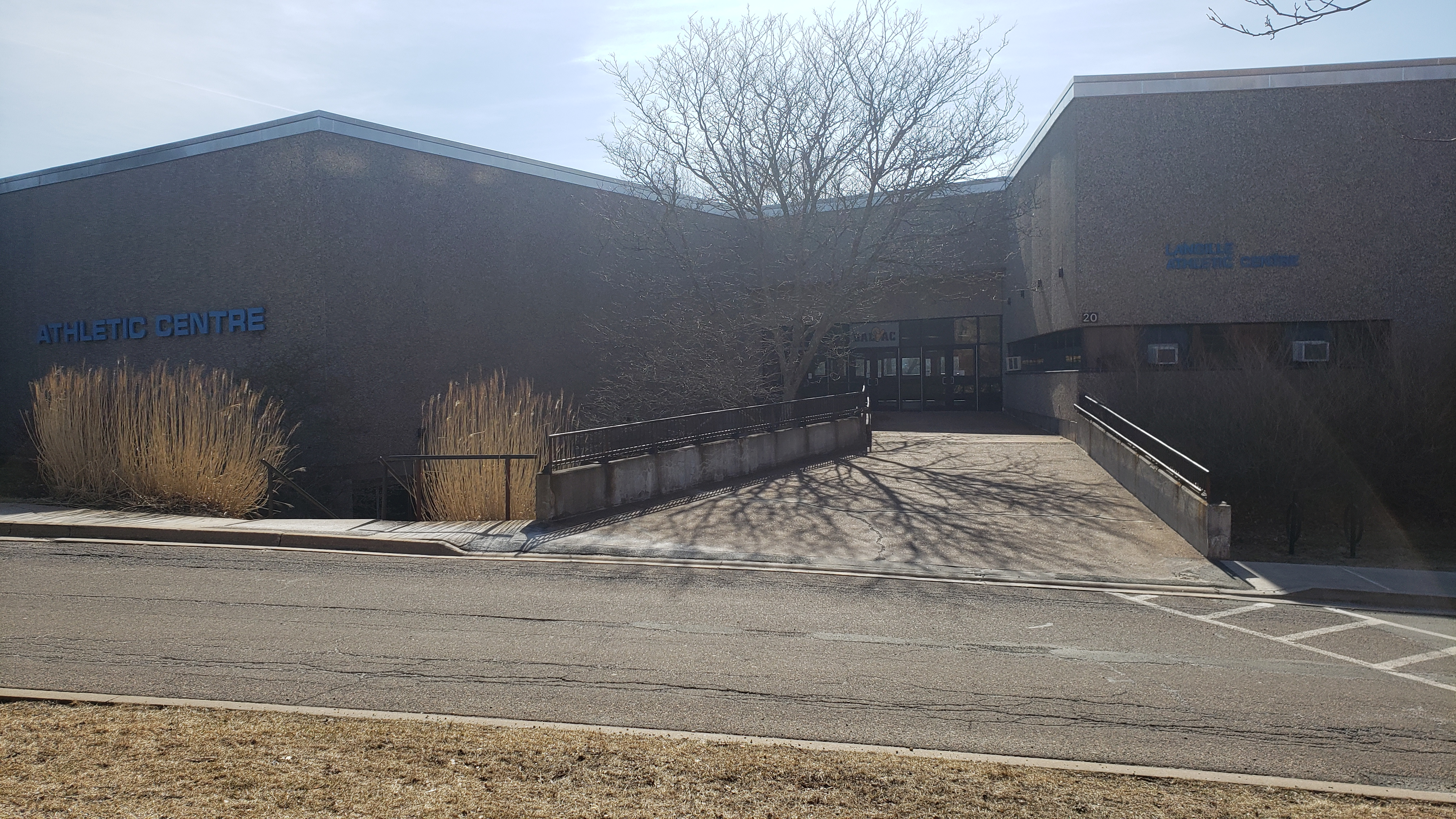

The Langille Athletic Centre, otherwise known as the LAC, is the campus athletic centre/gym for Dalhousie's Agricultural College. It is located at 20 Cumming Drive, Bible Hill, NS. The facility is the hub for athletics on campus, as well as hosts exams and convocation every year. Athletics are an integral part of college life which the campus serves through the Langille Athletic Centre.

== History ==
The Langille Athletic Center was completed in 1977 by Robert J. Flinn (1928-2018) of Halifax and the Robert J. Flinn Design Group. The building is faced with insulated precast concrete panels of aggregate rock which are attached to the walls as exterior cladding. A unique design feature are the two 5' diameter circular bubble windows or plexiglass domes on the northeast facade. These include a 3" deep, 45 degree recessed aluminum frame which prevent water damage and create shadows on the building. These two clear domes are repeated and contrasted in the two circular black ducts on the opposite southwest facade. The building represents a historical context to Truro, Nova Scotia as well as institutional design and campus architecture. The Langille Athletic Center is an excellent example of that short and distinct transitional period between modernist and postmodenist architecture styles.

Originally called the Nova Scotia Agriculture College Athletic Centre, then named in honour of Mr. Winston Langille in 1991. Mr. Langille Studied Chemistry at Acadia University, earning a Bachelor of Science and then going on to earn a Master of Science from McGill University. Later in life he was awarded an Honorary Doctorate of Civil Laws from Acadia University. Mr. Langille taught Chemistry and Soil Science at the Dalhousie's Agricultural College (formerly Nova Scotia Agricultural College) until his retirement and was also heavily involved in coaching varsity teams for the college. Mr. Langille was also an avid athlete himself, playing everything from baseball, hockey, rugby, tennis, golf, and curling. Mr. Langille died in 2018 but will always be remembered at the Langille Athletic Centre for his contribution to the Dal AC campus.

Past and Present Athletic Directors for the Langille Athletic Centre include:

- Ken Marchant (1977- 1994)
- Judy Smith (1994- 2019)
- Andrew Harding (2019 – present)

Other staff members include the program/project assistant, the facility supervisor, custodians, and a team of student staff consisting of Dal AC students.

== Hours of operation ==
	September - April	May - June	July - August
Mon-Fri	7 am - 9:30 pm	7 am - 9:30 pm	6 am - 9 pm
Saturday	10 am - 5 pm	10 am - 5 pm	Closed
Sunday	10 am - 9:30 pm	10 am - 9:30 pm	6 pm - 10 pm

== Varsity Teams ==
The Langille Athletic Centre is home to a number of varsity sports teams which compete in their respective league and have won a number of notable titles since their conception. The mascot for the campus, as well as the Langille Athletic Centre is a ram, otherwise known as Rocky the ram

=== Men's and Women's Soccer ===
Compete in the Atlantic Collegiate Athletic Association

- Men's Soccer Champions 1969/1970
- Men's Soccer Champions 1970/1971
- Men's Soccer Champions 1972/1973
- Women's Soccer Champions 1997/1998

=== Men's and Women's Basketball ===
Compete in the Atlantic Collegiate Athletic Association

- Men's and Women's Basketball Champions 1976/1977
- Men's and Women's Basketball Champions 1977/1978
- Women's Basketball Champions 1979/1980
- Men's Basketball Champions 1980/1981
- Women's Basketball Champions 1982/1983
- Women's Basketball Champions 1995/1996

=== Women's Volleyball ===
Compete in the Atlantic Collegiate Athletic Association

=== Men's and Women's Cross Country ===
Compete in the Atlantic Collegiate Athletic Association

- Men's Cross Country Running Champions 1987/1988
- Men's Cross Country Running Champions 1988/1989
- Men's Cross Country Running Champions 2012/2013
- Women's Cross Country Running Champions 2016/2017
- Men's Cross Country Running Champions 2018/2019

=== Men's and Women's Badminton ===
Compete in the Atlantic Collegiate Athletic Association

- Women's & Men's Badminton Champions 1979/1980
- Badminton Champions 1986/1987

=== Men's and Women's Woodsmen ===
Compete in the Canadian Intercollegiate Lumber-jacking Association

- Women's Woodsmen Champions 2004/2005
- Women's Woodsmen Champions 2005/2006
- Men's and Women's Woodsmen Champions 2011/2012
- Men's and Women's Woodsmen Champions 2012/2013
- Men's and Women's Woodsmen Champions 2015/2016
- Men's Woodsmen Champions 2016/2017
- Women's Woodsmen Champions 2017/2018
- Men's and Women's Woodsmen Champions 2018/2019

=== Equestrian ===
Compete in the Atlantic Intercollegiate Equestrian League * results data only available since the team became varsity in 2015/2016

- Grand Champions 2018/2019
- Grand Champions 2016/2017
- Grand Champions 2015/2016

Additionally, there have been a number of varsity sports team in the past that no longer exist on the Dal AC campus, these include:

=== Women's Field Hockey ===
- Women's Field Hockey Champions 1975/1976
- Women's Field Hockey Champions 1978/1979

=== Men's Volleyball ===
- Men's Volleyball Champions 1980/1981
- Men's Volleyball Champions 1996/1997
- Men's Volleyball Champions 1997/1998
- Men's Volleyball Champions 1998/1999

=== Men's and Women's Golf ===
- Women's Golf Champions 2013/2014
- Women's Golf Champions 2014/2015

=== Women's Rugby ===
- Women's Rugby Champions 2013/2014

The facility has also hosted a number of national championships for the varsity leagues

- National Badminton Host 1994
- National Basketball Host 1995
- National Volleyball Host 1996
- National Badminton Host 1999
- Men's Basketball Host 2002
- Women's Basketball Host 2003
- Women's Volleyball Host 2006
- Men's Basketball Host 2007
- Women's Basketball Host 2008
- Men's Basketball Host 2012
- Women's Basketball Host 2013

== Facility Equipment ==
The Langille Athletic Centre provides an extensive range of equipment and space for use for students and members of the community. The facility includes a full-sized outdoor soccer field, full-sized basketball court, with six retractable basketball nets and room for six badminton/Pickleball nets or two side-by-side volleyball nets, it also has a half-sized court used as a stage which has two basketball nets and room for one badminton/pickleball net or one volleyball net. There is also a free weight area for lifting weights which includes a functional fitness room fitted with various plyometric/calisthenics equipment and a cardio area fitted with treadmills, bikes, ellipticals, a stair mill, rower and assistive weight machines. There are also two squash courts and one racquetball court available for use and all necessary sports equipment is available for loan at the facility. Additionally, there are gendered full-sized locker rooms including washrooms and showers for the facility users.

== Memberships ==
Memberships are available to the community for purchase with many different membership options including discounts for non-Dal AC students, Dal AC faculty, Dal AC alumni and seniors. In addition to regular memberships, there are also 1-month memberships, 10 visit punch passes, and drop in rates available. Memberships for current Dal AC students is included in their college tuition.

== Special Programs and Event ==
=== Programs ===
The Langille Athletic Centre has a number of special programs offered for students and members with many more short-term programs occurring frequently. Established programs include

- The Legge Massage Therapy office which operates out of the facility
- The Free Wheelin’ Program which is a bike rental program free of charge with a required deposit
- Fitness classes (offered based on availability and attendance)
- Intramurals such as PHAT boys basketball and pickleball.

=== Events ===
Special events that are hosted annually are:

- Convocation
- Rocky's Run which is a 5 km run available for not only members and students, but also the broader community, and is the largest fundraiser supporting the facility
- The Christmas Craft Market
- Agri-Golf Classic

The facility also plays host for a number of events such as badminton provincials and other local sporting groups during the year.
