= Jack Hawkins (politician) =

Canadian politician

The Honourable Jack Hawkins ECNS
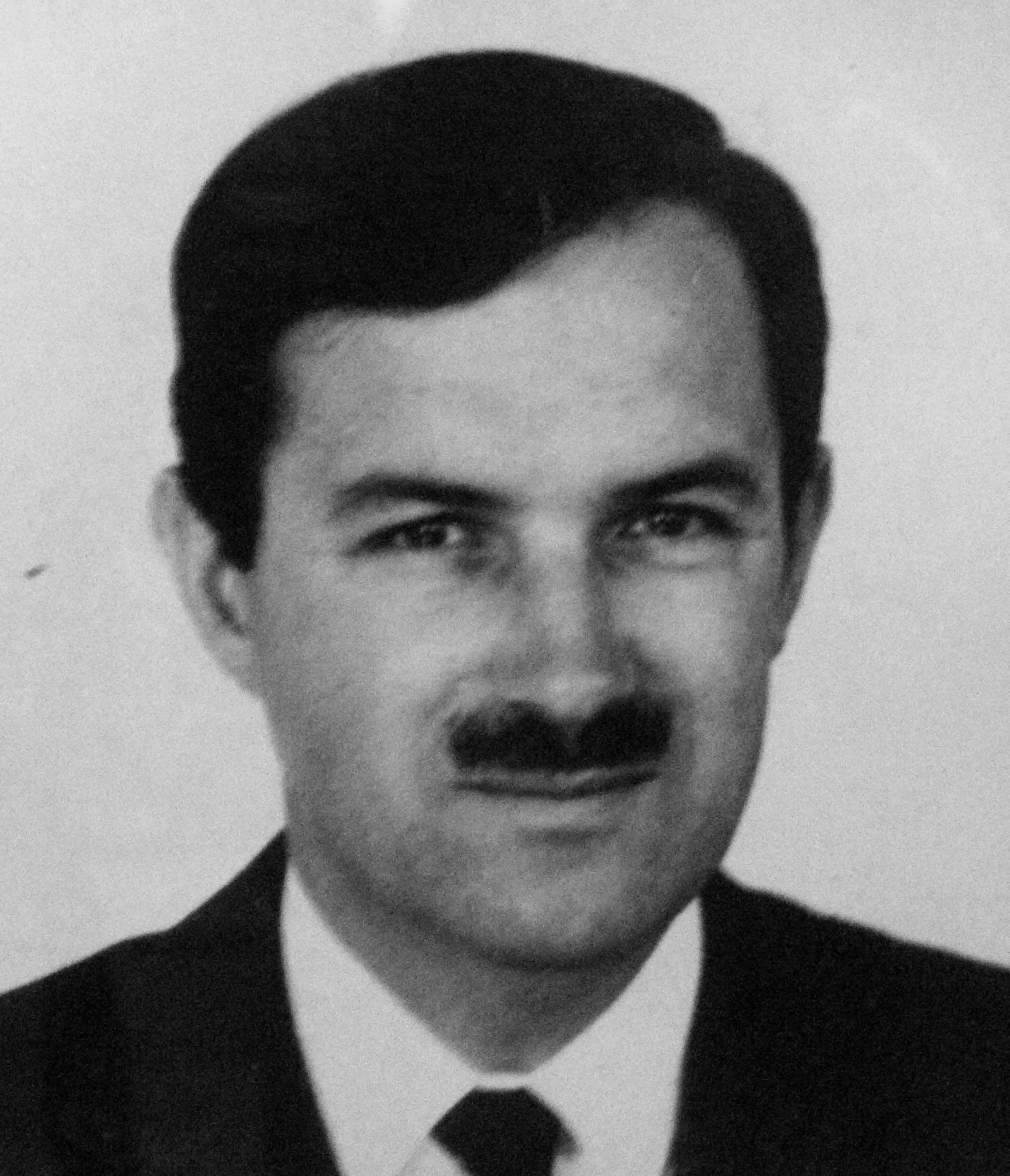
- Hawkins, c. 1973

MLA for Hants East
- In office 1970–1978
- Preceded by: Albert Ettinger
- Succeeded by: G. Patrick Hunt
- In office 1980–1984
- Preceded by: G. Patrick Hunt
- Succeeded by: Cora Etter
- In office 1988–1993
- Preceded by: Cora Etter
- Succeeded by: Bob Carruthers

Personal details
- Born: 5 May 1932 (age 94) Halifax, Nova Scotia
- Party: Nova Scotia Liberal Party
- Occupation: Professor; author

Walter John "Jack" Hawkins (born 5 May 1932) is a Canadian author and politician from Nova Scotia. He served as a Liberal member for Hants East in the Nova Scotia House of Assembly across three non-consecutive terms from 1970 to 1993, holding Executive Council roles such as Minister of Agriculture and Minister of the Environment. Hawkins has authored several books, including the popular Deer Hunting in Eastern Canada (1981) and various historical works about Nova Scotia.

== Early life and education ==
Jack Hawkins was born on 5 May 1932 in Halifax, Nova Scotia, to parents Walter John and Dorothy Marguerite Hawkins (née Hartnett). He was raised in Enfield, and attended the E. H. Horne School. Hawkins graduated from St. Mary's College High School, where he received awards for his academic performance in English, French, and Latin. He was an active sportsman in his youth, playing baseball and ice hockey in senior leagues. After graduating from high school, he earned his Bachelor of Arts from Saint Mary's University and completed Canadian Army officer training. He served in the army as a lieutenant from 1955 to 1960, including a two-year tour in Europe. He went on to earn a Master of Arts in English from the University of New Brunswick before returning to Nova Scotia to continue his studies at Dalhousie University.

== Career ==
After finishing his education, Hawkins became an English professor at the Nova Scotia Agricultural College in Truro. He worked in radio doing commentary for CBC Maritimes and a local station, and wrote a column for the Truro News entitled "Plain Talk". He began his career in politics in 1963, serving as a municipal councillor in East Hants until 1967. In 1970, Hawkins was elected as the Member of the Legislative Assembly (MLA) for Hants East. He served in Executive Council as Minister of Agriculture from 1972 to 1978 and as Minister of the Environment from 1975 to 1976. Hawkins also served as chair of the Nova Scotia Treasury Board from 1975 to 1978 and Chair of the Liberal caucus from 1981 to 1983.

Hawkins wrote two books on the subject of politics, the first of which being The Life and Times of Angus L. (1969), concerning the Nova Scotia politician Angus L. MacDonald. His book Recollections of the Regan Years: A Political Memoir (1990) discusses his political career during the premiership of Gerald Regan. His most popular book is Deer Hunting in Eastern Canada (1981) which has been republished at least 10 times; on account of its positive reception, he subsequently wrote More About Hunting Deer and Rabbits in Eastern Canada (1993). His historical works include Renfrew Gold: the Story of a Nova Scotia Ghost Town (1995), concerning the gold mining town of Renfrew, and Captains, Mansions and Millionaires: The Remarkable Story of Maitland, Nova Scotia (1996), which discusses the history of Maitland.

== Personal life ==
Hawkins married his wife, Monique Marie Roach, in 1956. They had three children together, and live in Enfield. His wife, who goes by Mona, assisted him throughout his political career. Like her husband, she was active in community affairs, serving as president of the Enfield and Hants County Home and School Associations and as honorary president of the Women's Institute of Nova Scotia.

== Publications ==
- — (1965). The Life and Fiction of Thomas H. Raddall (Thesis). University of New Brunswick. OCLC 436382739.
- — (1969). The Life and Times of Angus L.. Windsor, N.S.: Lancelot Press. OCLC 1867550.
- — (1981). Deer Hunting in Eastern Canada. Hantsport, N.S.: Lancelot Press. ISBN 0-8899-9149-9.
- — (1990). Recollections of the Regan Years: a Political Memoir. Hantsport, N.S.: Lancelot Press. ISBN 0-8899-9453-6.
- — (1993). More About Hunting Deer and Rabbits in Eastern Canada. Hantsport, N.S.: Lancelot Press. ISBN 0-8899-9519-2.
- — (1995). Renfrew Gold: the Story of a Nova Scotia Ghost Town. Hantsport, N.S.: Lancelot Press. ISBN 0-8899-9573-7.
- — (1996). Captains, Mansions and Millionaires: The Remarkable Story of Maitland, Nova Scotia. Hantsport, N.S.: Lancelot Press. ISBN 0-8899-9642-3.
- — (1999). The Founding of Halifax. Halifax, N.S.: Goldcloth Publishing. ISBN 0-9685-6890-4.
- — (2000). The Halifax Military Establishment. Halifax, N.S.: Goldcloth Publishing. ISBN 0-9685-6891-2.
- — (2002). Trout Fishing in Nova Scotia. Halifax, N.S.: Goldcloth Publishing. ISBN 978-0-9685-6892-7.
- — (2016). The Name of Horne: Jacob Horn and His Descendents. Enfield, N.S.: [s.n.] ISBN 978-0-9958-0330-5.
- — (2017). Snow: A Book of Verse. Halifax, N.S.: Goldcloth Publishing. ISBN 978-0-9685-6893-4.

== Electoral record ==
1988 Nova Scotia general election
Party	Candidate	Votes	%
Liberal	Jack Hawkins	4,502	47.09
Progressive Conservative	Cora Etter	3,977	41.60
New Democratic	Richard Preeper	1,082	11.32
Total valid votes		9,561	
Total rejected ballots		44	
Turnout		9,605	
Eligible voters		13,047	
Source: Elections Nova Scotia

1984 Nova Scotia general election
Party	Candidate	Votes	%
Progressive Conservative	Cora Etter	3,730	48.57
Liberal	Jack Hawkins	3,192	41.57
New Democratic	Herbert H. Radley	757	9.86
Total valid votes		7,679	
Total rejected ballots		26	
Turnout		7,705	
Eligible voters		11,604	
Source: Elections Nova Scotia

1981 Nova Scotia general election
Party	Candidate	Votes	%
Liberal	Jack Hawkins	3,041	39.13
Progressive Conservative	G. Patrick Hunt	2,983	38.39
New Democratic	Harry McNeil	1,747	22.48
Total valid votes		7,771	
Total rejected ballots		26	
Turnout		7,797	
Eligible voters		10,246	
Source: Elections Nova Scotia

1978 Nova Scotia general election
Party	Candidate	Votes	%
Progressive Conservative	G. Patrick Hunt	4,035	51.63
Liberal	Jack Hawkins	3,294	42.15
New Democratic	Clair White	486	6.22
Total valid votes		7,815	
Total rejected ballots		53	
Turnout		7,868	
Eligible voters		9,657	
Source: Elections Nova Scotia

1974 Nova Scotia general election
Party	Candidate	Votes	%
Liberal	Jack Hawkins	3,322	49.88
Progressive Conservative	Avard Ettinger	2,690	40.39
New Democratic	Clair White	549	8.24
Independent	John G. Stanhope Sr.	99	1.49
Total valid votes		6,660	
Total rejected ballots		57	
Turnout		6,717	81.33
Eligible voters		8,259	
Source: Elections Nova Scotia

1970 Nova Scotia general election
Party	Candidate	Votes	%
Liberal	Jack Hawkins	3,115	52.73
Progressive Conservative	Albert Ettinger	2,793	47.27
Total valid votes		5,908	
Total rejected ballots		39	
Turnout		5,947	
Eligible voters		7,147	
Source: Elections Nova Scotia
