= Cora Etter =

Canadian politician (1924–2020)

MLA for Hants East
- In office 1984–1988
- Preceded by: Jack Hawkins
- Succeeded by: Jack Hawkins

Personal details
- Born: Cora Helena Brown; October 10, 1924 Bishopville, Nova Scotia, Canada
- Died: August 19, 2020 (aged 95) Shubenacadie, Nova Scotia, Canada
- Party: Progressive Conservative
- Occupation: pharmacy, management, business and property development

Cora Helena Etter (née Brown; October 10, 1924 – August 19, 2020) was a Canadian politician in Nova Scotia. She served in the 54th General Assembly of Nova Scotia as a Progressive Conservative member for Hants East. In the 1988 election, she was defeated by Liberal Jack Hawkins.

== Biography ==
Cora Etter was born on October 10, 1924 in Bishopville, Nova Scotia, to parents James and Cora Brown. She attended the Provincial Teachers College in Truro, followed by the Maritime College of Pharmacy. Etter and her husband operated pharmacies in Shubenacadie, Elmsdale, and Stewiacke, and were involved in a variety of other business ventures. She was among the charter members of the East Hants Historical Society, established in 1967. Etter is an inductee of the Atlantic Business Women's Hall of Fame, and received a Canadian Women in Business Lifetime Achievement Award in 1993.

Prior to entering provincial politics, she represented Shubenacadie on the East Hants municipal council for over 20 years, starting in 1960. She was thus nicknamed the "mayor of Shubenacadie". She was elected as the Member of the Legislative Assembly (MLA) for Hants East in 1984, defeating incumbent Liberal MLA Jack Hawkins. At the time, Etter was one of only three women in the Nova Scotia Legislature, alongside cabinet minister Maxine Cochran and the New Democratic Party's leader Alexa McDonough. In the 1988 election, Etter lost her seat to Hawkins in a rematch.

Etter died on August 19, 2020 at the age of 95.

== Electoral record ==
1988 Nova Scotia general election
Party	Candidate	Votes	%
Liberal	Jack Hawkins	4,502	47.09
Progressive Conservative	Cora Etter	3,977	41.60
New Democratic	Richard Preeper	1,082	11.32
Total valid votes		9,561	
Total rejected ballots		44	
Turnout		9,605	
Eligible voters		13,047	
Source: Elections Nova Scotia

1984 Nova Scotia general election
Party	Candidate	Votes	%
Progressive Conservative	Cora Etter	3,730	48.57
Liberal	Jack Hawkins	3,192	41.57
New Democratic	Herbert H. Radley	757	9.86
Total valid votes		7,679	
Total rejected ballots		26	
Turnout		7,705	
Eligible voters		11,604	
Source: Elections Nova Scotia
