= Dalhousie University Faculty of Agriculture =

Agricultural school at Dalhousie University

Faculty of Agriculture Dalhousie University
- Former names: Nova Scotia Agricultural College (1905-2012); The School of Horticulture (1893-1905); The School of Agriculture (1885-1905)
- Type: Public agricultural college
- Established: 1905
- Academic affiliations: ACCC, AUCC, IAU, CBIE, CUP.
- Endowment: $3.049 million
- Dean: Gefu Wang-Pruski
- Students: 961 (2010)
- Location: Bible Hill, Nova Scotia, Canada; 45°22′15″N 63°15′26″W
- Campus: Rural
- Colors: Blue & gold
- Nickname: Rams, Aggies
- Sporting affiliations: CCAA
- Mascot: Rocky
- Website: dal.ca/agriculture

The Faculty of Agriculture at Dalhousie University is a Canadian agricultural college and faculty of Dalhousie University located in Bible Hill, Nova Scotia. The Faculty of Agriculture offers the only university level programs in agriculture in Atlantic Canada. Founded 14 February 1905 as the Nova Scotia Agricultural College within the Nova Scotia Department of Agriculture, it merged with Dalhousie University on 1 September 2012. The campus is referred to as Dalhousie University's "Agricultural Campus" or by its popular sports nickname of "Dal AC" or simply the "AC."

== History ==
The Faculty of Agriculture was officially founded on 1 September 2012 with the merger of the Nova Scotia Agricultural College (NSAC) into Dalhousie University.

The Faculty of Agriculture traces its history to The School of Agriculture, founded in 1885 and located in Truro, as well as The School of Horticulture, founded in 1893 and located in Wolfville. These two institutions merged on 14 February 1905 to form the Nova Scotia Agricultural College (NSAC) and the new institution, managed by the Government of Nova Scotia's Department of Agriculture, relocated to the provincial demonstration farm in Bible Hill.

The Bible Hill campus, located on a bluff along the north bank of the Salmon River, expanded throughout the 20th century to a total area of 442 hectares (1,092 acres).

In the early years, the NSAC and its predecessor institutions focused on educating farmers in aspects of field and animal husbandry. These early graduates often went on to pursue a university degree, usually from Macdonald College at McGill University or the Ontario Agricultural College in Guelph, Ontario.

A disastrous fire in 1946 destroyed the science building and a temporary campus was set up at a former Canadian Army hospital at nearby Camp Debert. This temporary campus served students until the fall of 1953 when the new science building, now known as the Harlow Institute, was opened on the Bible Hill campus.

In 1980 the Government of Nova Scotia passed legislation authorizing the institution to grant undergraduate B.Sc. (Agr.) degrees. The decision was made by the institution to do this in association with Dalhousie University and the first students graduated with the new degree in 1985. An agreement was subsequently made with Dalhousie to provide M.Sc. degrees beginning in 1996. NSAC granted its own diplomas for 2-year technology programs and the institution remained an independent post-secondary research and education institution administered by the Nova Scotia Department of Agriculture.

To commemorate the 100th anniversary of the NSAC, Canada Post issued 'Nova Scotia Agricultural College, 1905-2005' on 14 February 2005 as part of the Canadian Universities series. The stamp was based on a design by Denis L'Allier and a photograph by Guy Lavigueur. The 50¢ stamps are kiss cut and were printed by Lowe-Martin Company Inc.

A fire seriously damaged the main teaching building - the Cox Institute - on 21 June 2018. While repairs were made, the old Sears location in the Truro Mall was turned into teaching and office space for the remainder of the 2018–19 school year.

In December 2023, the Haley Institute was significantly damaged by vandalism and suffered significant water damage. This has resulted in the first floor of the building being closed for an indefinite period of time while repairs are being made.

== Programs ==
The Faculty of Agriculture offers the following academic programs:

Graduate programs

- Master of Science (MSc)
- PhD in Agricultural Sciences

Undergraduate programs

- Agricultural Business
- Agricultural Economics
- Animal Science
- Aquaculture
- Bioveterinary Science
- Engineering (first two years)
- Environmental Sciences
- Integrated Environmental Management
- International Food Business
- Landscape Architecture
- Plant Science
- Pre-Veterinary Medicine
- Small Business Management (B.Tech.)
- Bachelor of Science (first year only)
- Bachelor of Computer Science (first year only)

Diploma and technical programs

- Business Management
- Dairy Business Management
- Managed Landscapes
- Plant Science
- Veterinary Technology

Continuing education certificate programs

- Certificate of Specialization in Organic Agriculture
- Certificate in Animal Welfare
- Certificate in Genetics and Molecular Biology
- Certificate in Integrated Pest Management
- Certificate in International Rural Development
- Certificate in Sustainable Development
- Certificate in Technology Education
- Post-Baccalaureate Certificate in Environmental Biology
- Post-Baccalaureate Certificate in Food Bioscience

== Barley Ring ==
The barley ring is the official ring of the Faculty of Agriculture; the ring was first introduced in 2010. The barley pattern was selected as it is an important crop harvested in Nova Scotia and one of the first crops planted at the Agricultural Campus in 1890. The barley ring is easily recognized by its distinctive barley pattern around the band. Each ring is individually hand made by Donna Hiebert of Truro, N.S.

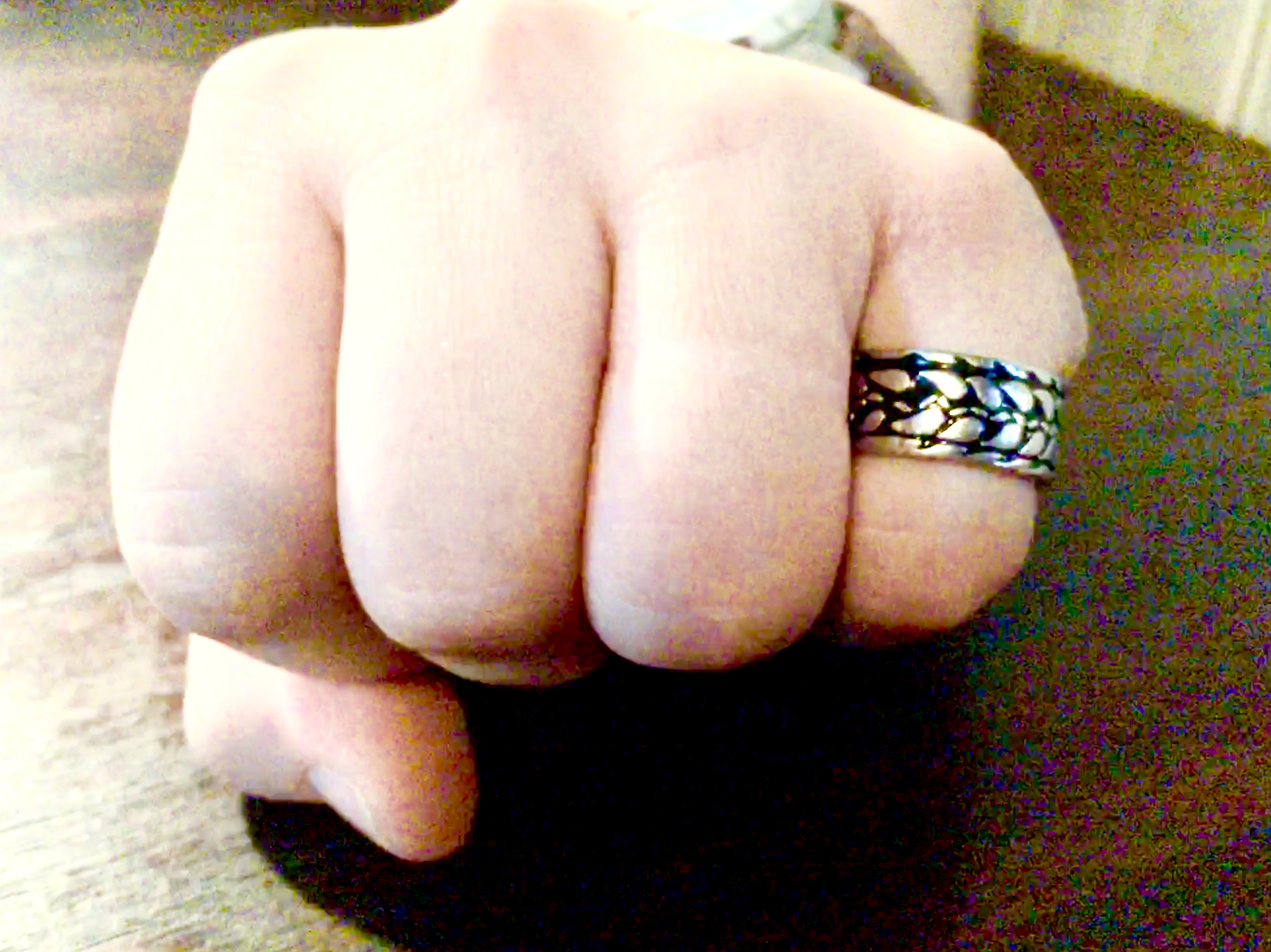
Wide band, stainless steel alumni ring (barley ring) from Dalhousie University's Faculty of Agriculture.

Rings are available with a wide or narrow band, in 14k white and yellow gold or in stainless steel.

== Athletics ==
The Dalhousie Agricultural Campus Rams have teams that compete in the Atlantic College Athletic Association, the Canadian Intercollegiate Lumberjacking Association (CILA) and the Atlantic Intercollegiate Equestrian League. In the 2015–2016 season, both the men's and women's woodsmen teams won the CILA championship. In the 2016 - 2017 season of the ACAA, the women's cross country team won the provincial championship race. The campus has one athletic facility called the Langille Athletic Center, situated beside the Cox Institute of Agricultural Technology on Cumming Drive. As of 2023, there are eight sport teams that include; Badminton, cross country, men's soccer, women's soccer, women's volleyball, men's volleyball, loggersports, and women's rugby that all compete in the ACAA. New in the 2018–2019 school year, Dalhousie Agriculture campus paired with Legge Health Clinic to offer student athletes the opportunity for convenient and affordable therapy. At Dal AC Sports Therapy they offer; Premium sports, therapy, message therapy, osteopathy, chiropractic, naturopathic medicine, acupuncture, low level laser phototherapy, SFMA, cupping and myofascial therapy.

== Housing ==
- Chapman house is a co-ed residence and can hold 125 students. It houses mostly first year students and transfer students.
- Fraser house is co-ed also, with the option of all female or male sections. It holds up to 100 students who are mostly returning students and transfer students.
- Trueman house is the smallest of the three houses, but also boasts rooms devoted only to mature (>23 years of age) and graduate students on the ground floor.

== Farm ==
There is a farm on campus, located on Farm Lane, that consists of:

- Chute Animal Nutrition Center

The centre is named in honour of the late Dr. Harold Chute, a Class of ’44 alumnus, who was the most energetic proponent of the need for the facility and who is the largest single benefactor for the project. Dr. Chute was awarded an Honorary Degree in 1998, the Distinguished Alumnus Award in 1994 and the Honorary Associate Award in 1976.

- Fur Unit

The Fur Unit was developed in 1984 as a teaching and research unit.

- Atlantic Poultry Research Center (APRC) It is also the head office of the Atlantic Poultry Research Institute (APRI), which completes in-depth research that is directed towards all sectors of the Atlantic poultry industry, including eggs, chicken, turkey, hatcheries, processing, and feed manufacturing with the goal to have a positive impact on growth and innovation in the industry.
- Ruminant Animal Center

The Ruminant Animal Centre (RAC) is home to the school's dairy and sheep farms; the dairy farm consists of Holstein cattle and the sheep of various breeds and crosses. These animals are used to conduct research on, and are teaching models for many classes on campus. The centre is a teaching and research facility for ruminant animal production.

- Machinery Shed

The machinery shed is the centre of crop management and provides machinery, seed and fertilizer storage. The shed also offers facilities for machinery repair and maintenance. It is not used by the school for teaching but by the farm itself to ensure operations continue to run smoothly.

- Feed Processing Plant

The feed processing plant is a key component of the Faculty of Agriculture's research and teaching farm. Grinding, extrusion and rolling of raw materials takes place here, as well as micro- and macro ingredient mixing of rations for research for various livestock species on the farms. As well, the plant includes storage and mixing resources, and a small batch mixing room, increased storage area, a steam pelleter, and other resources.

The feed processing plant includes a computerized horizontal mixer, multiple bulk bins, a mezzanine for storage and access to equipment and a pre-mix room. Plans are currently being finalized for the addition of a small batch mixing room, a steam pelleter, an operator station and increased storage area.

== Gardens ==
=== Alumni Garden ===
The Alumni Garden were originally established as a research nursery. The beauty of the garden is highly appreciated by students, staff, and community members alike. Often, it's the setting for graduate or wedding photography. The intriguing landscaping and horticultural selections from beautiful perennial roses to at times banana trees is a widely admired treasure of the Agricultural Campus.

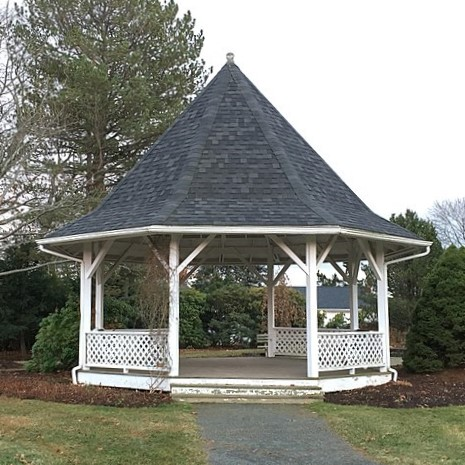

=== Butterfly Garden ===
The Butterfly Garden is located South and South-West of the Hailey Institute. It features a wide range of perennial flowers and shrubs attract butterflies and offer them an optimal habitat.

=== Herb Garden ===
The Herb Garden is located between the Alumni Garden and the International House. The Herb Garden was designed by Carol Goodwin, faculty member, and built in 1994 by student, Leon Verdurmen, and Carol. It features a traditional "four quarter" design which predates medieval gardens. The selection of plants includes a variety of medicinal and culinary plants, as well as some dye plants.

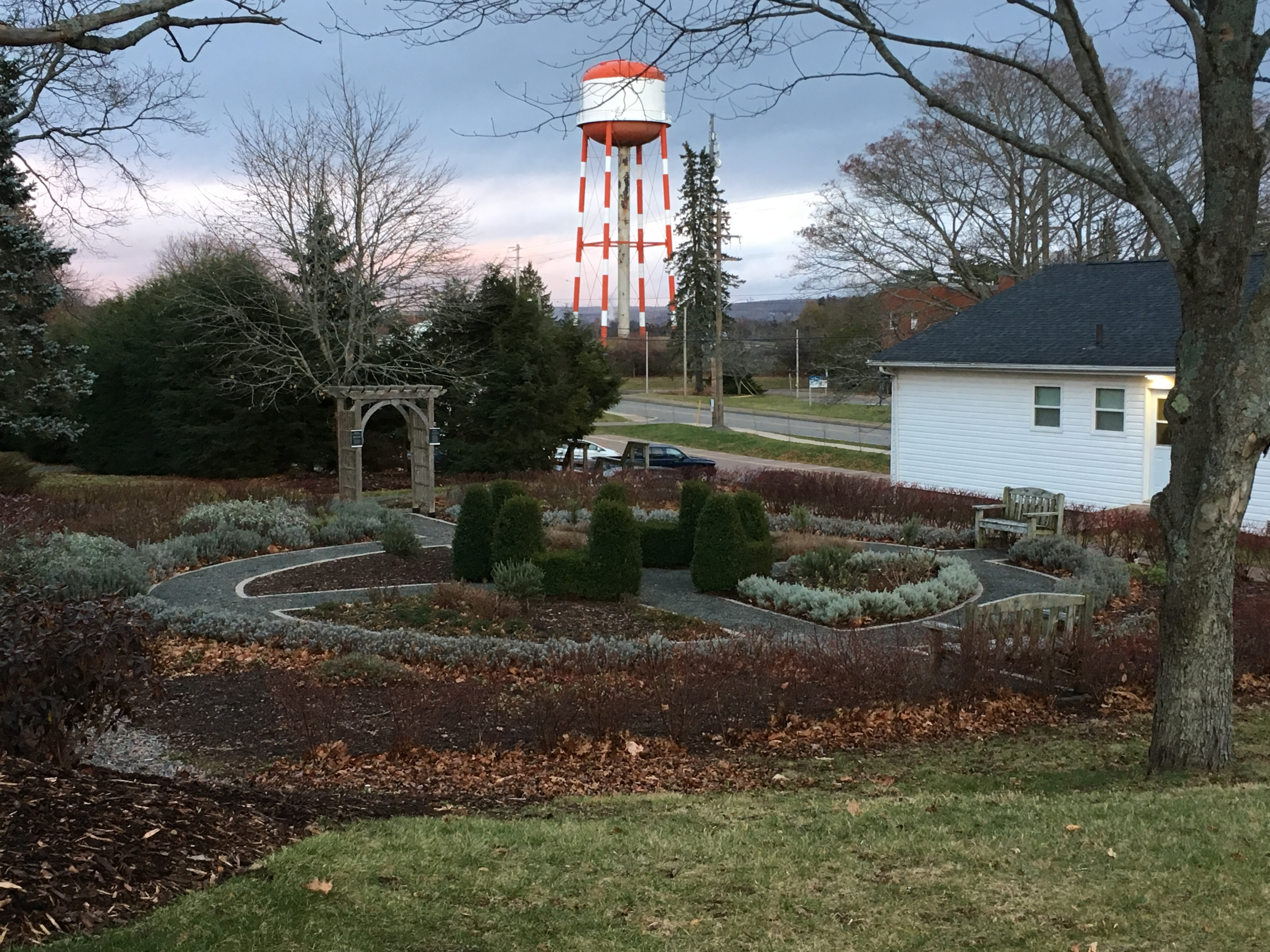

=== Rock Garden ===
The Rock Garden is located centrally on campus between College Road, and Rock Garden Road. It gifted to the Agricultural Campus by the Friends of the Garden. Featuring uncommon plants in a very sophisticated layout, the Rock Garden invites for exploration, relaxation, and offers quiet outdoor study areas (wooden and stone seating). The garden is supported and maintained through the Friends of the Garden and the Nova Scotia Rock Garden Club. 450 tons of local red granite was utilized to create the stunning landscape. Beside more expected rock garden plants, one can find beside many others: Cacti, a Ginkgo biloba tree, and a beautiful Japanese maple tree. Visitors are asked to stay on the graveled and marked walking paths, and dogs are prohibited.

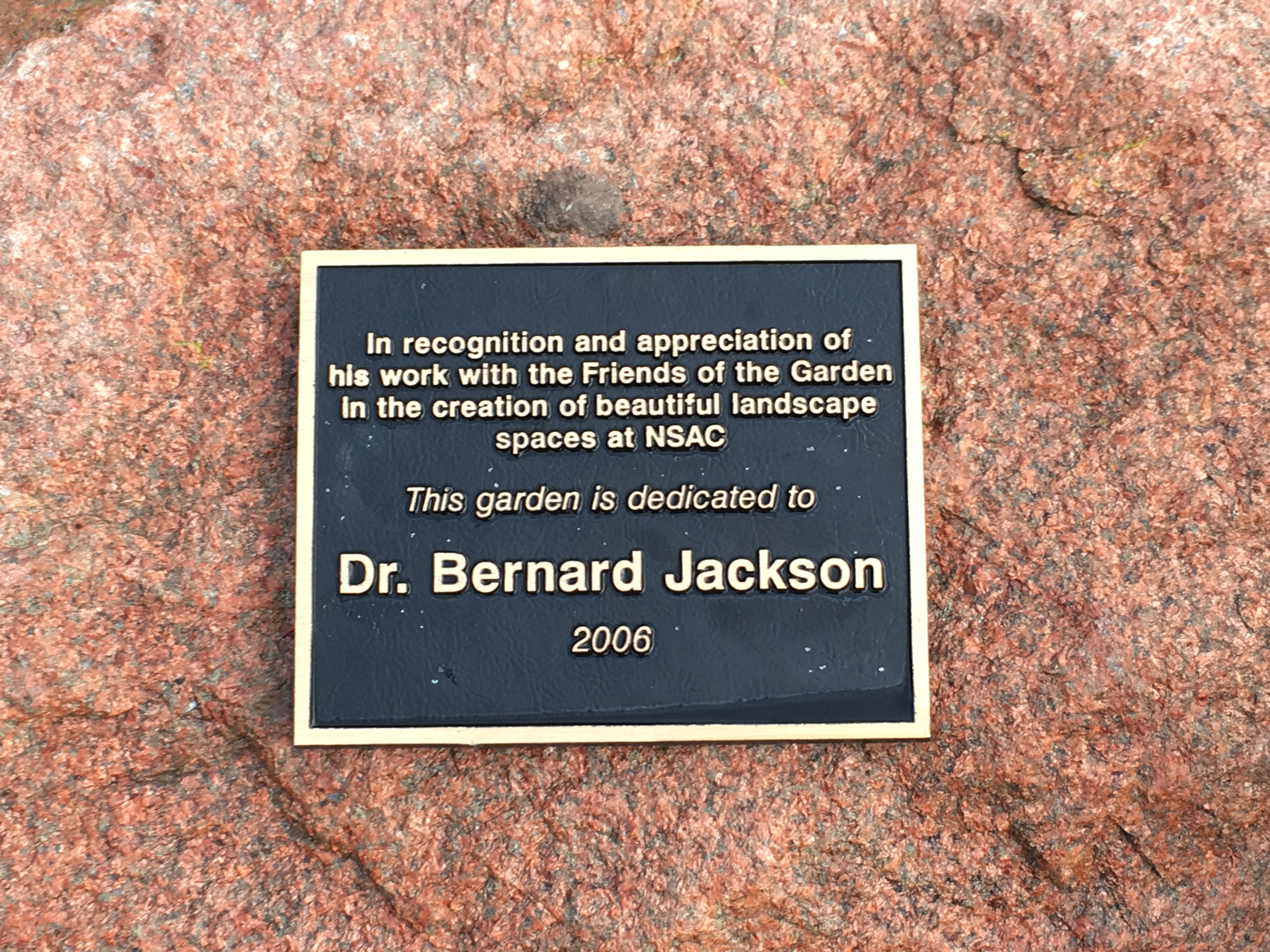

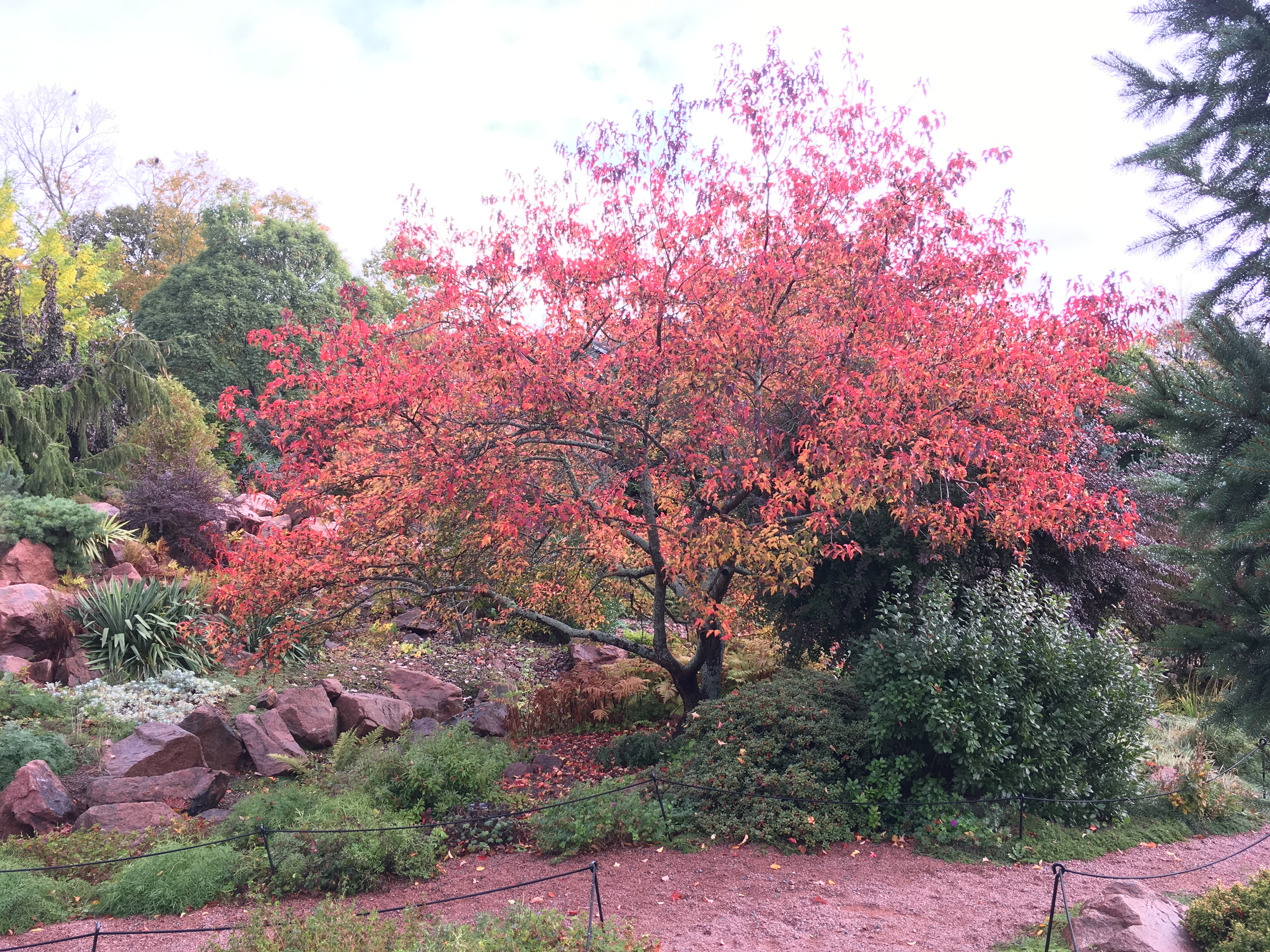

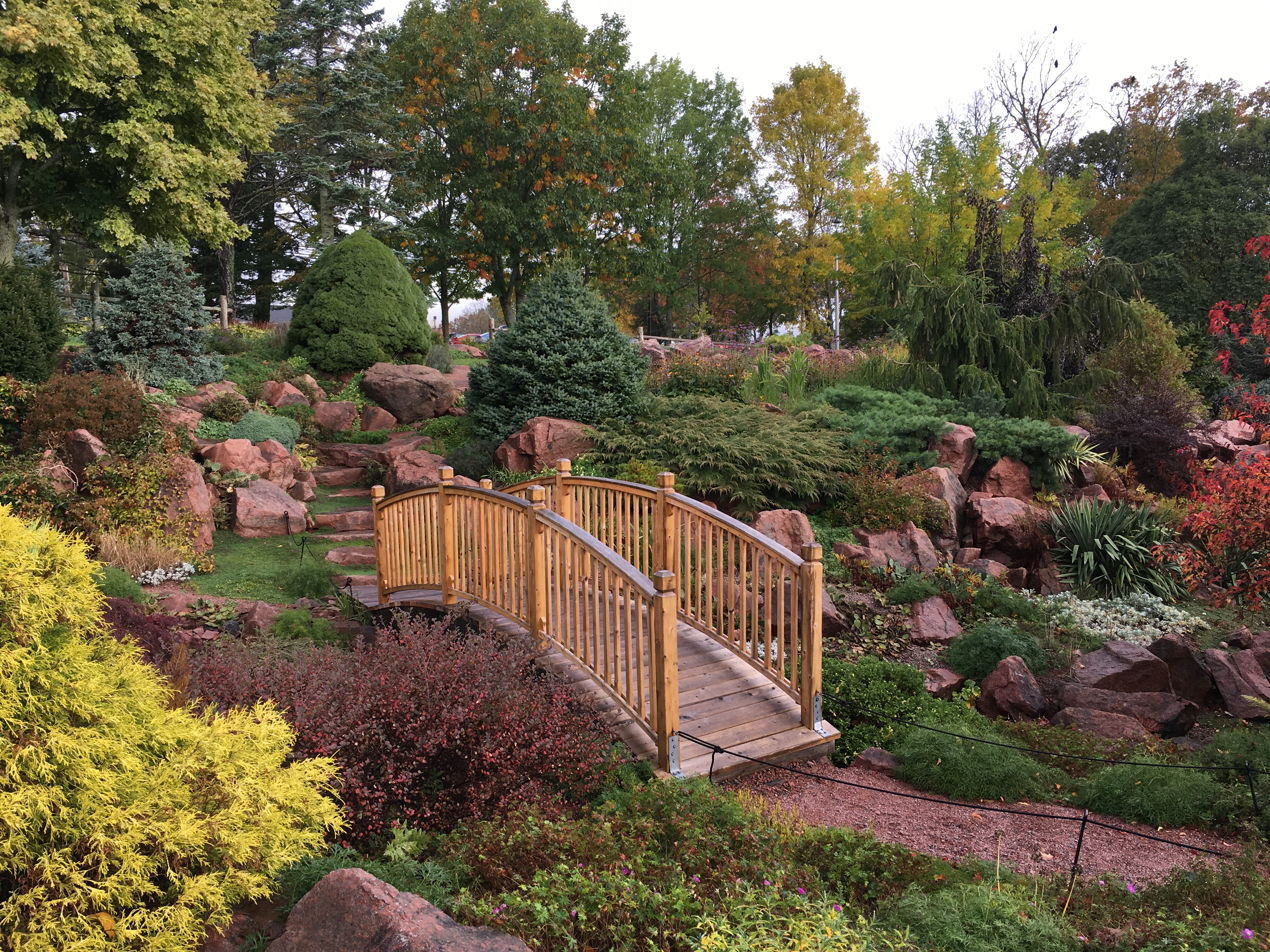

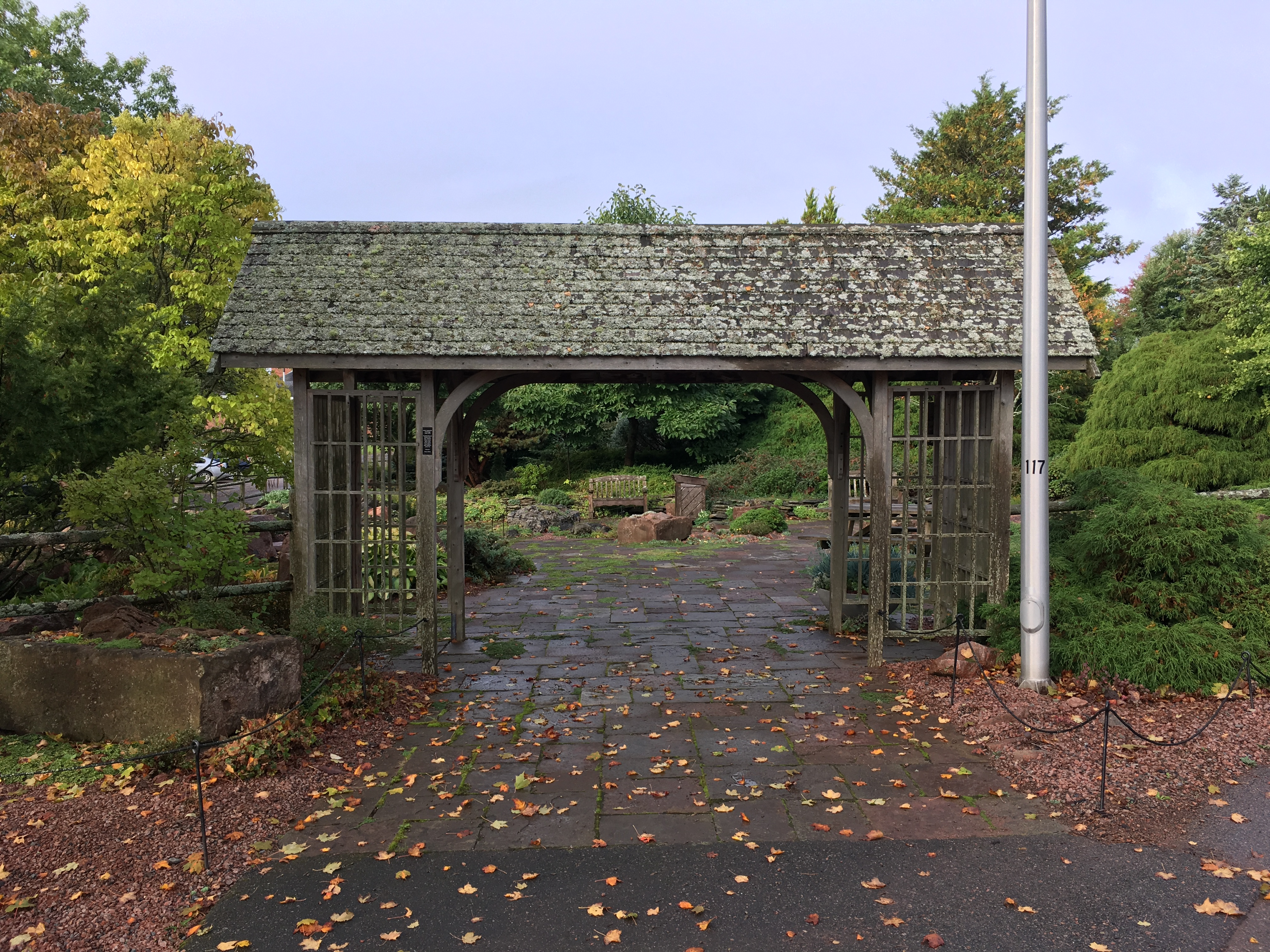

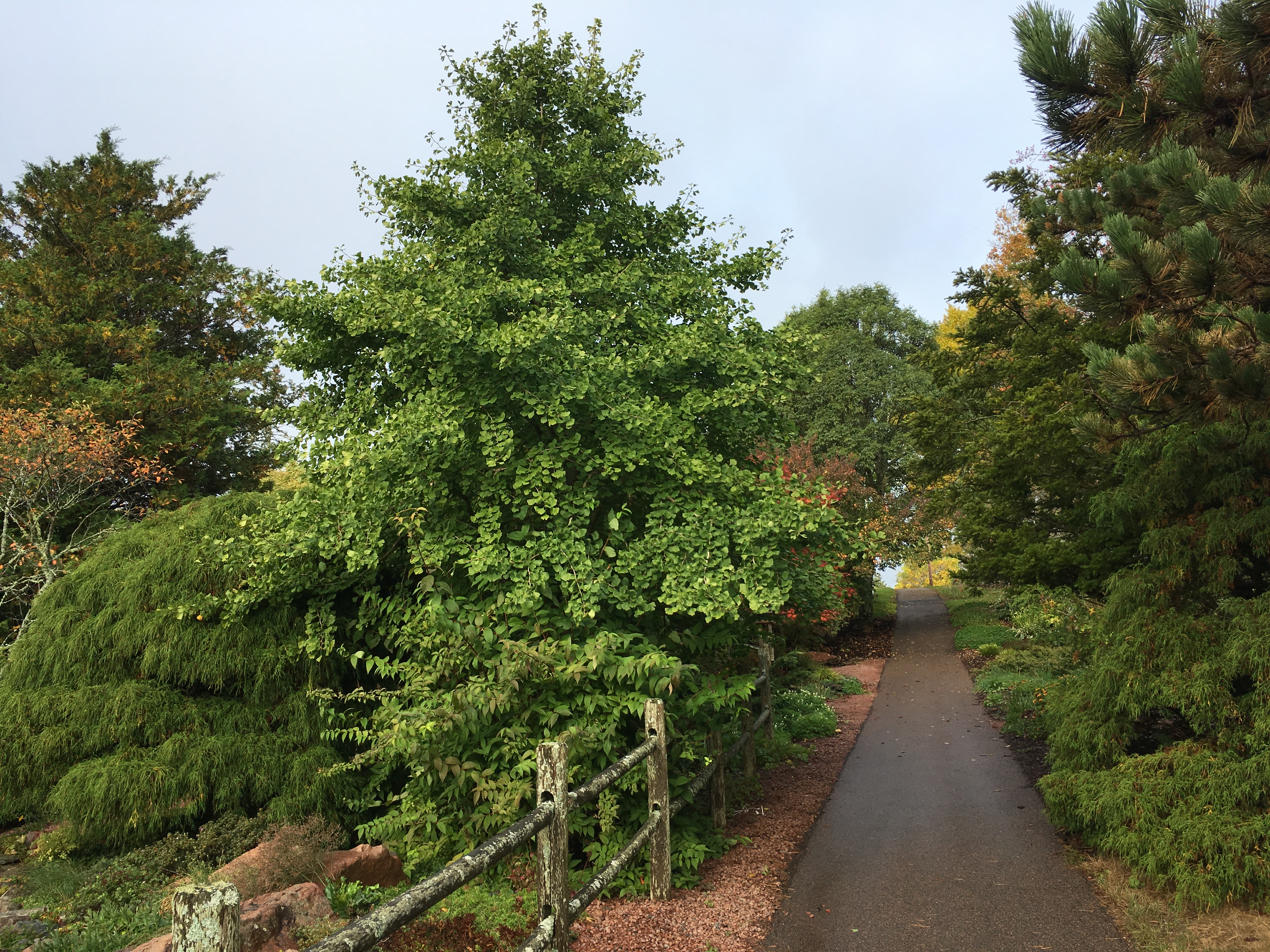

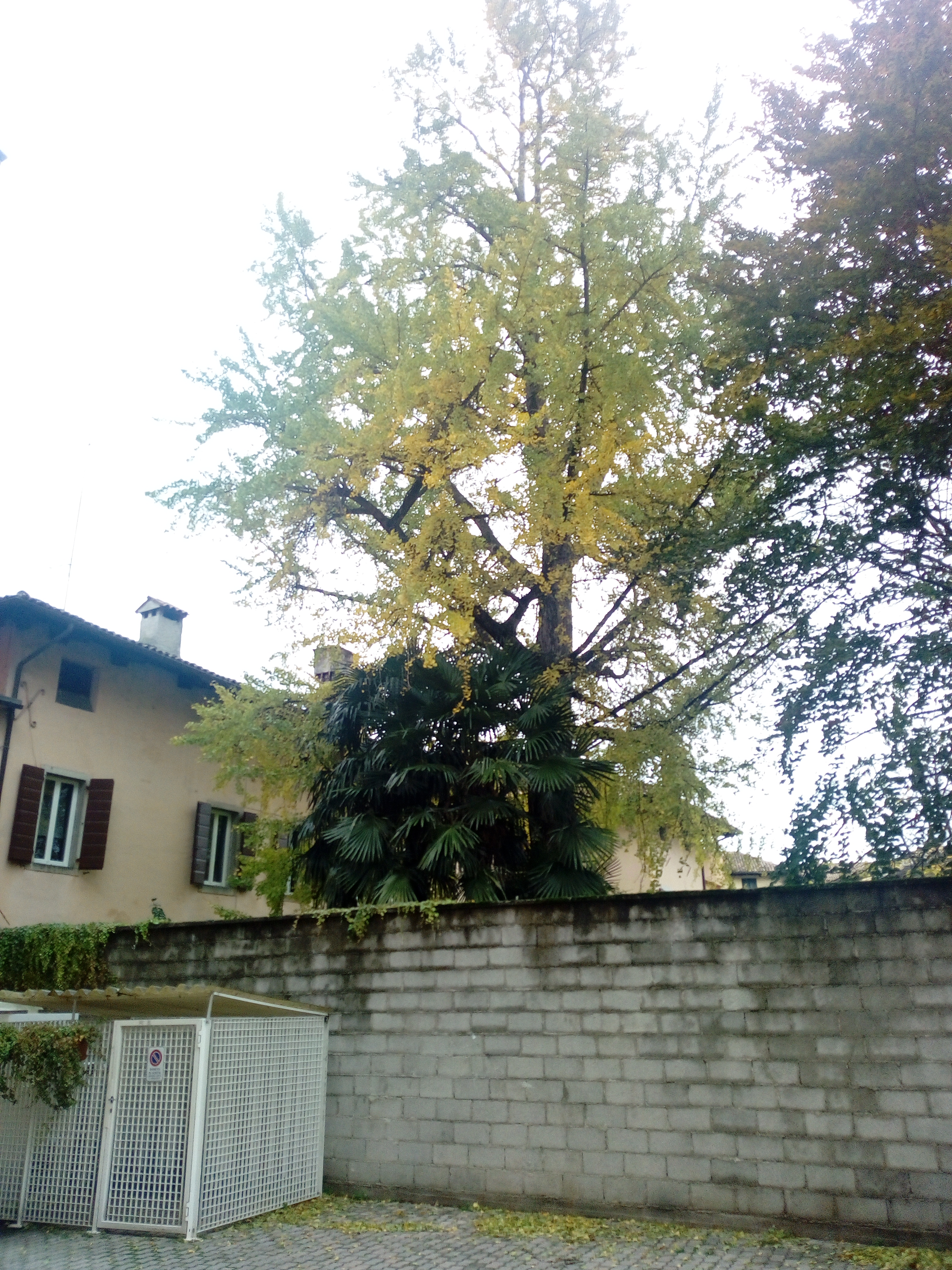

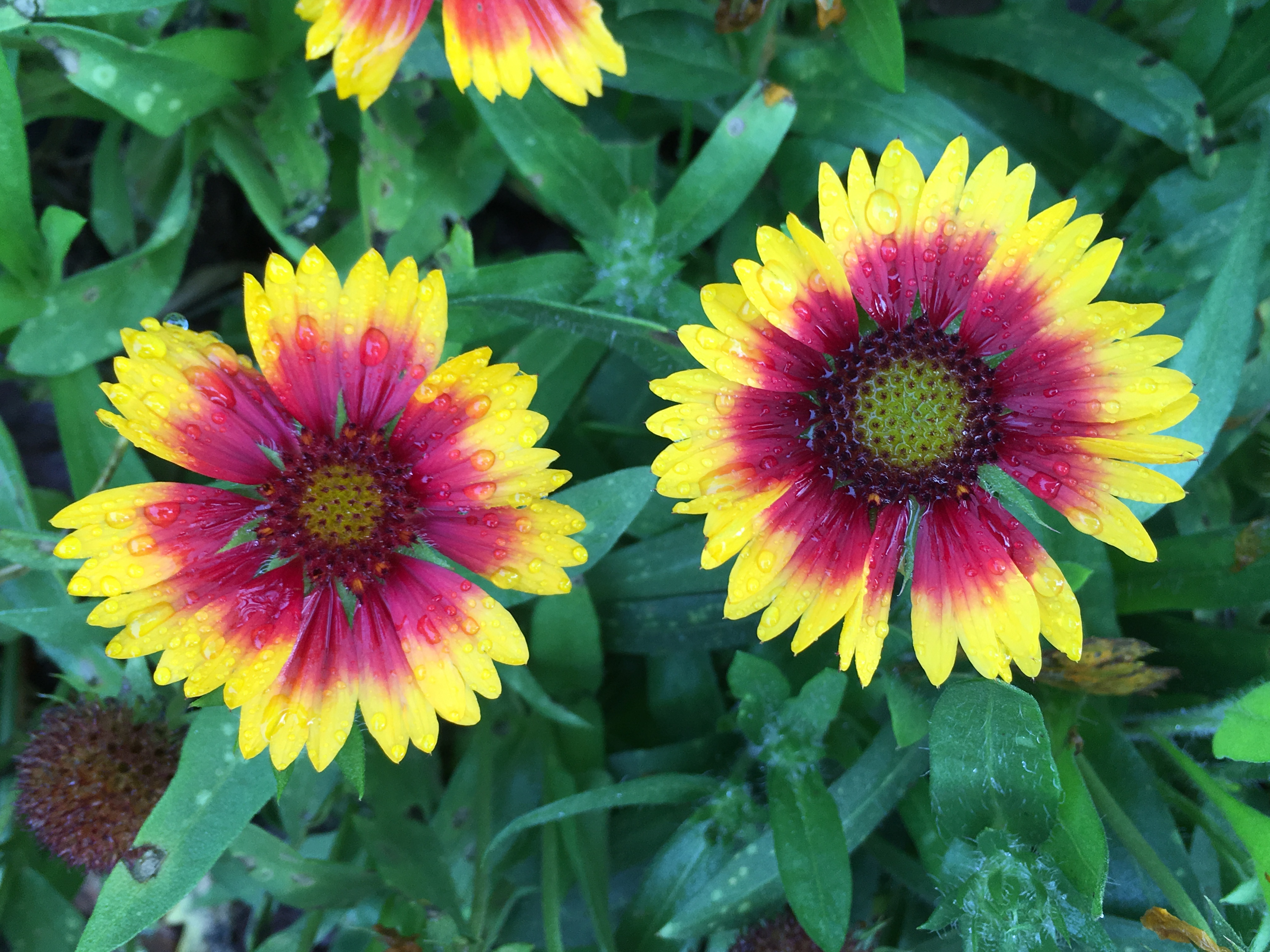

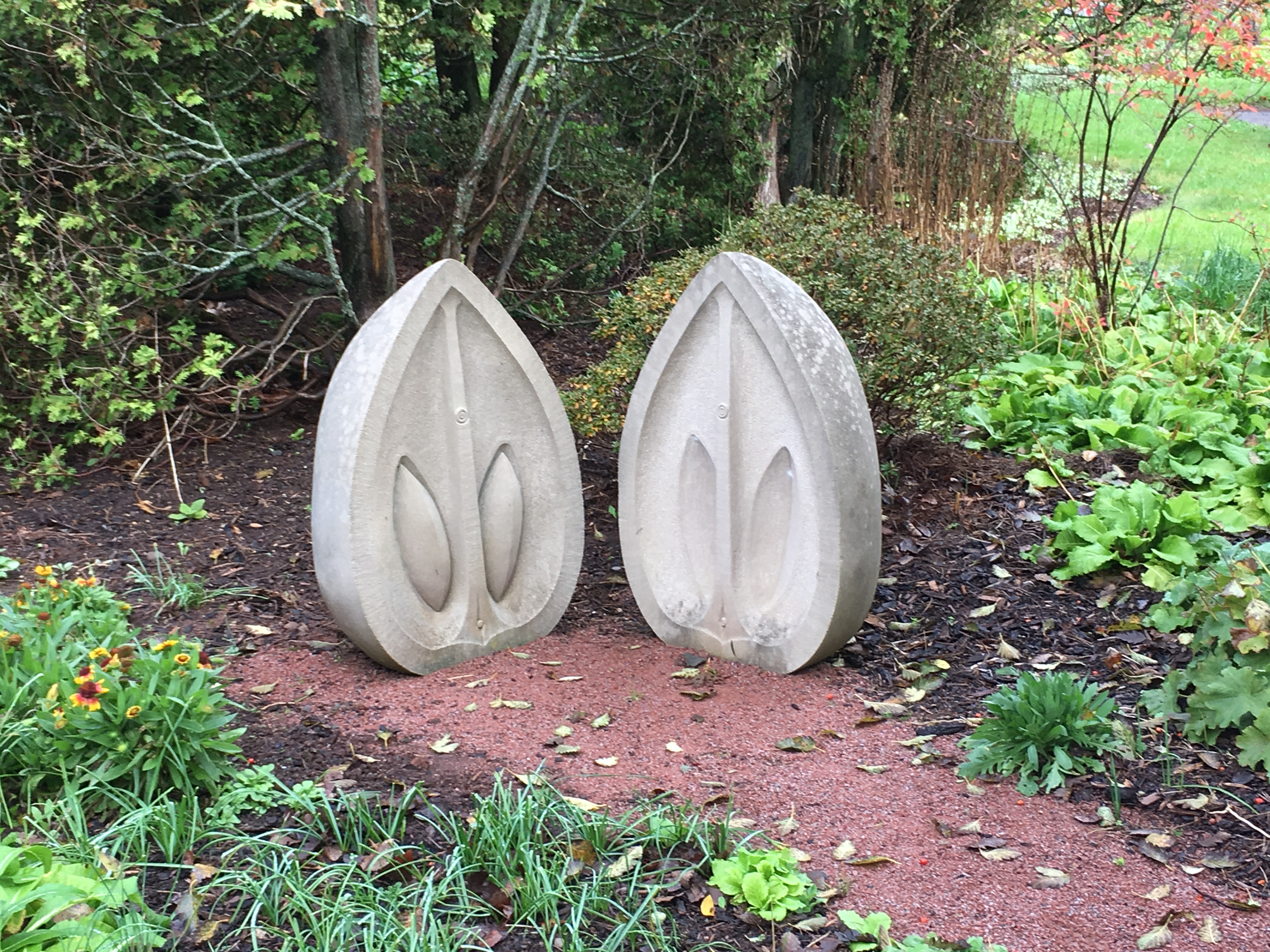

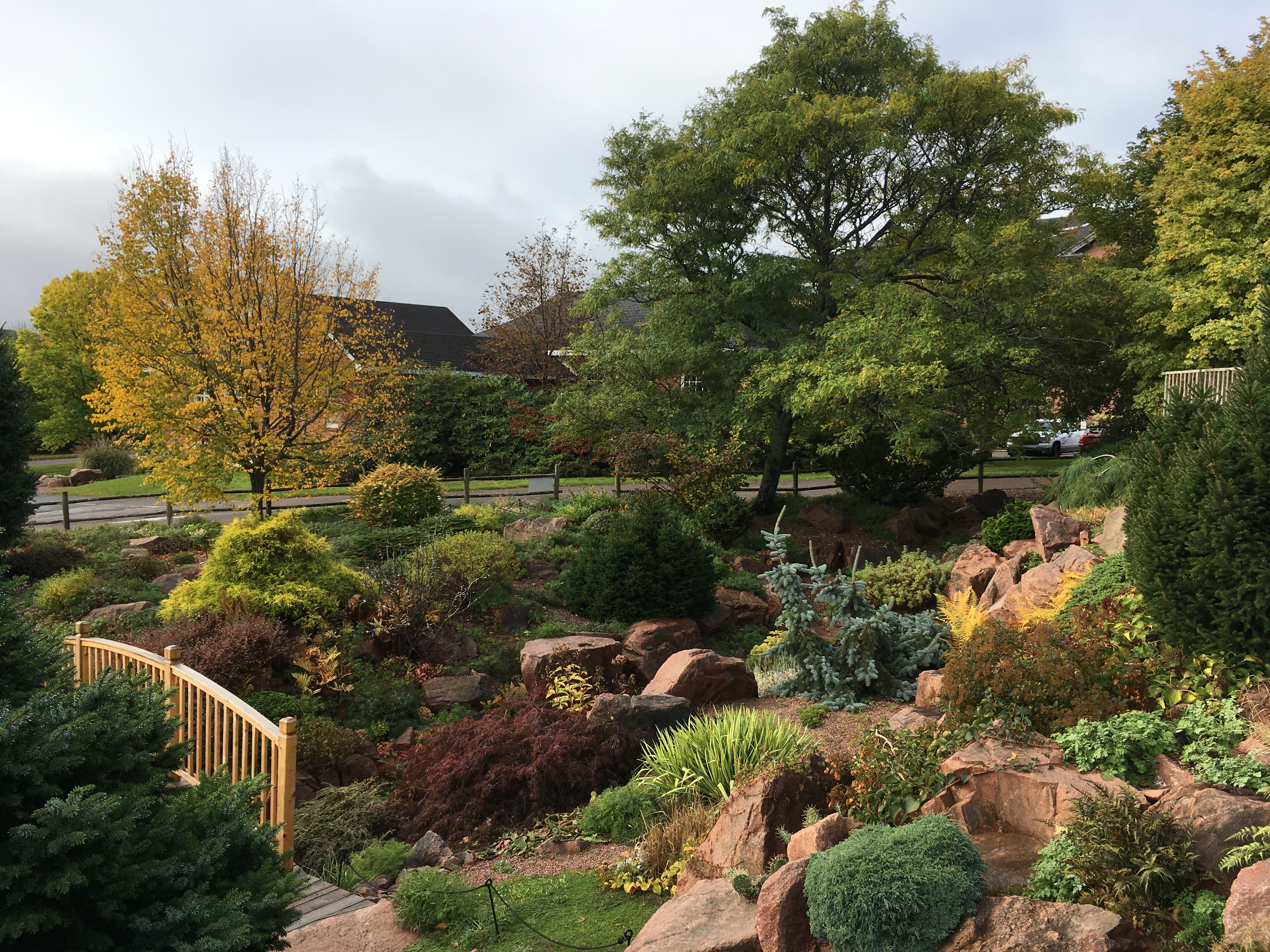

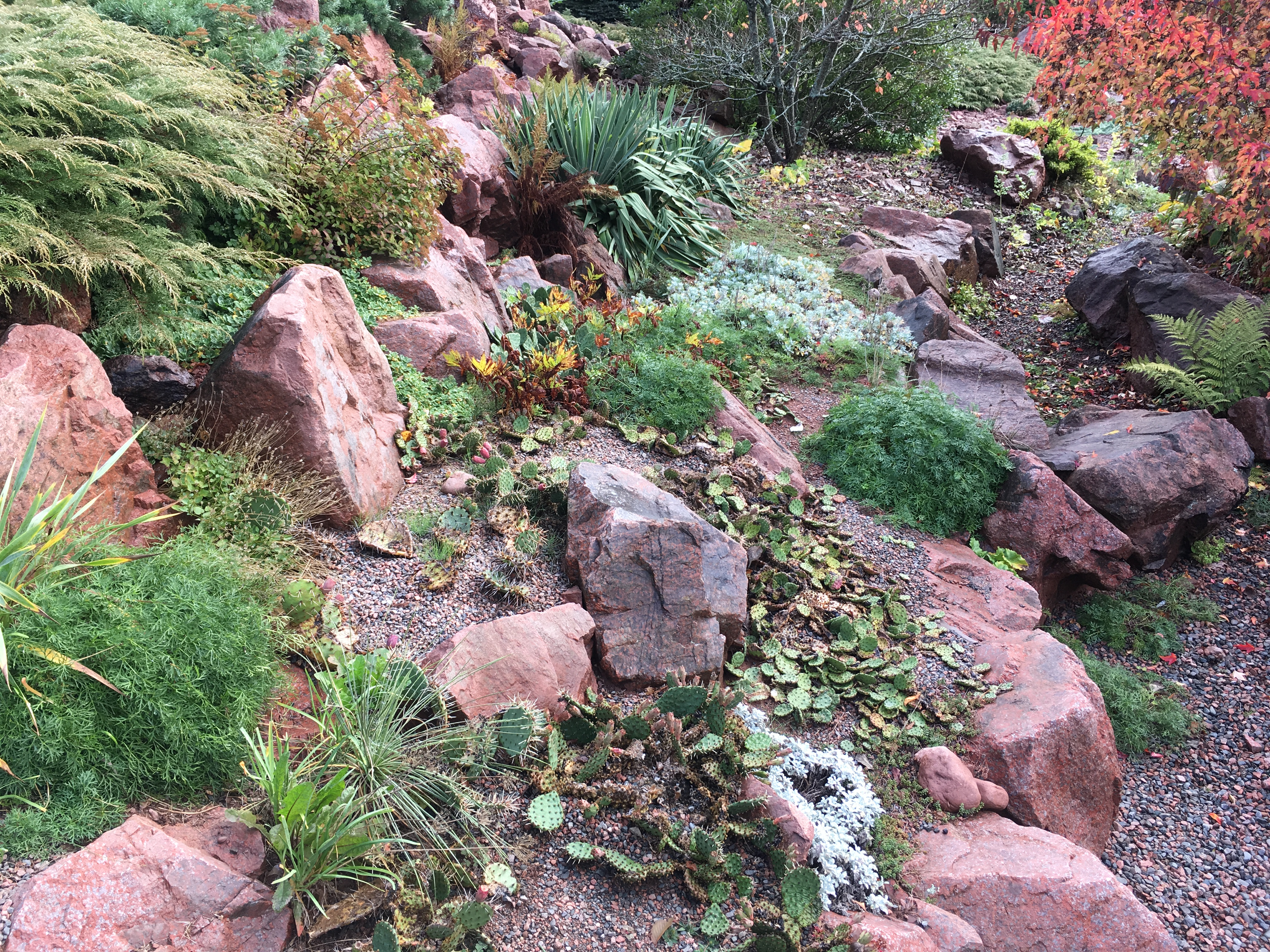

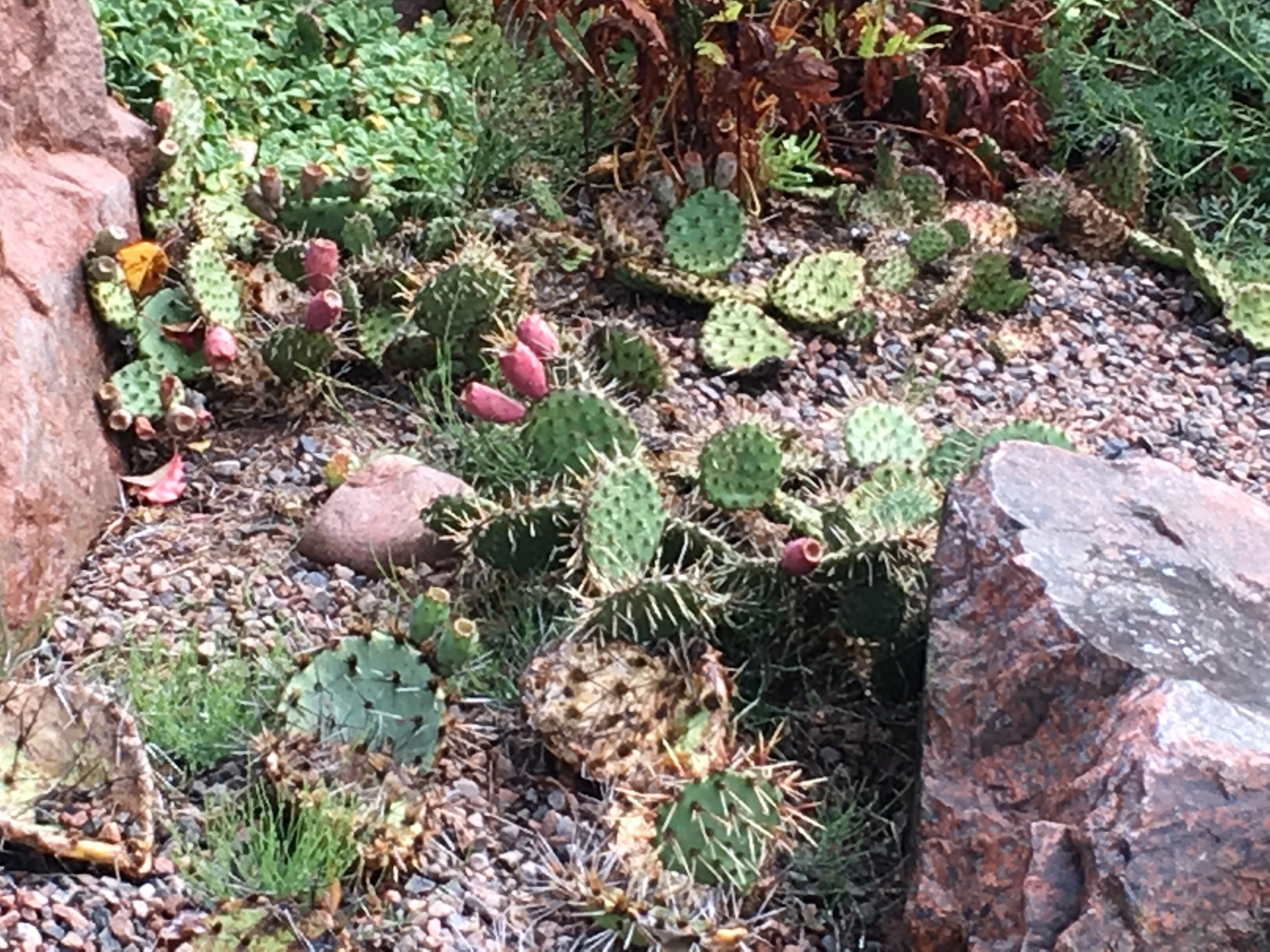

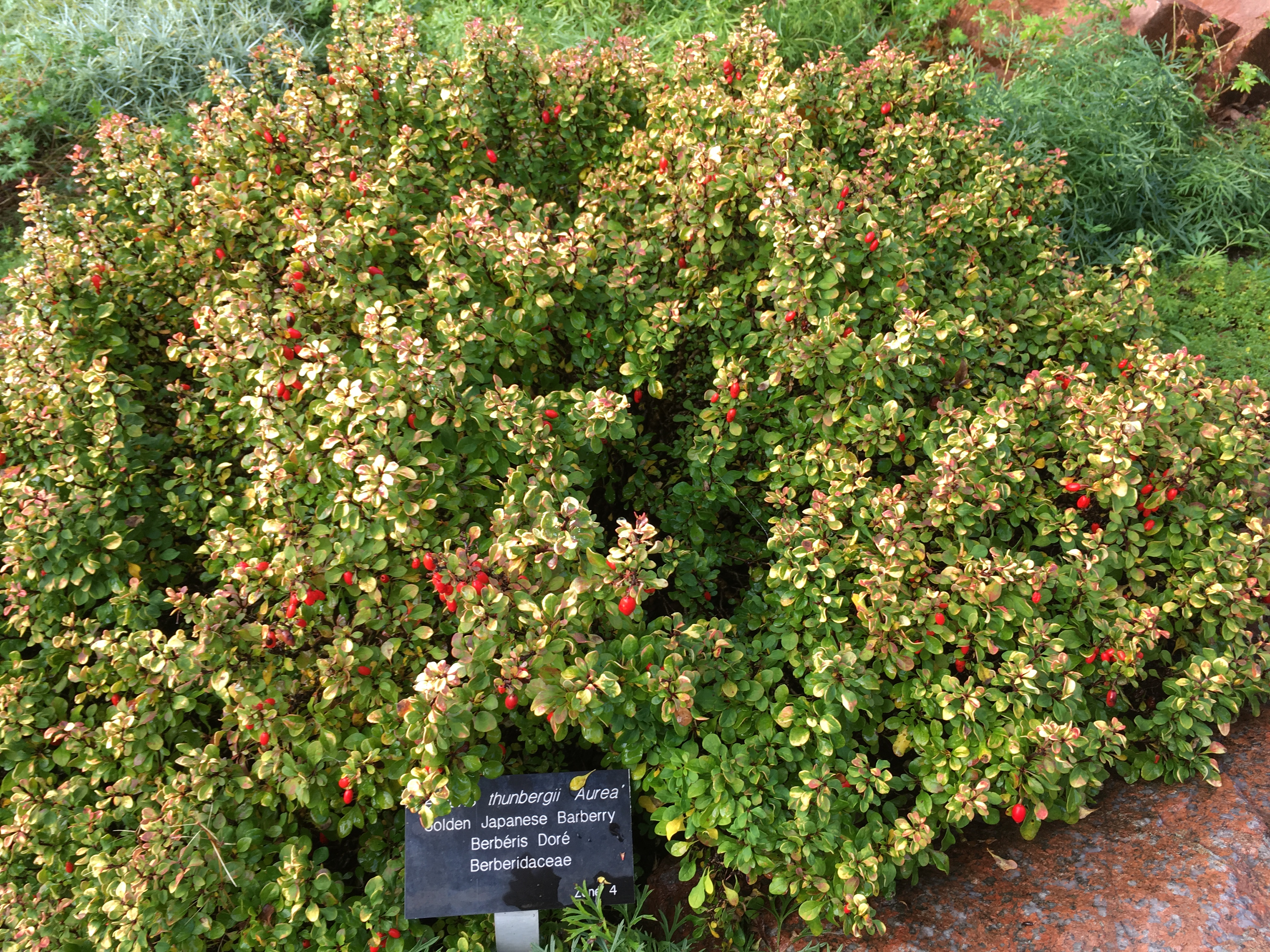

=== Chef's Garden ===
The Chef's Garden was established in 2011 through a student's initiative. It grows a wide variety of vegetable crops using organic agriculture principles. The fields measure in total 121' x 400' (1.1-acre), and are located behind the Banting Building and across the street from the AC Community Garden. In the growing season 2017, the garden offered CSA boxes (Community-supported agriculture) to students for the first time.

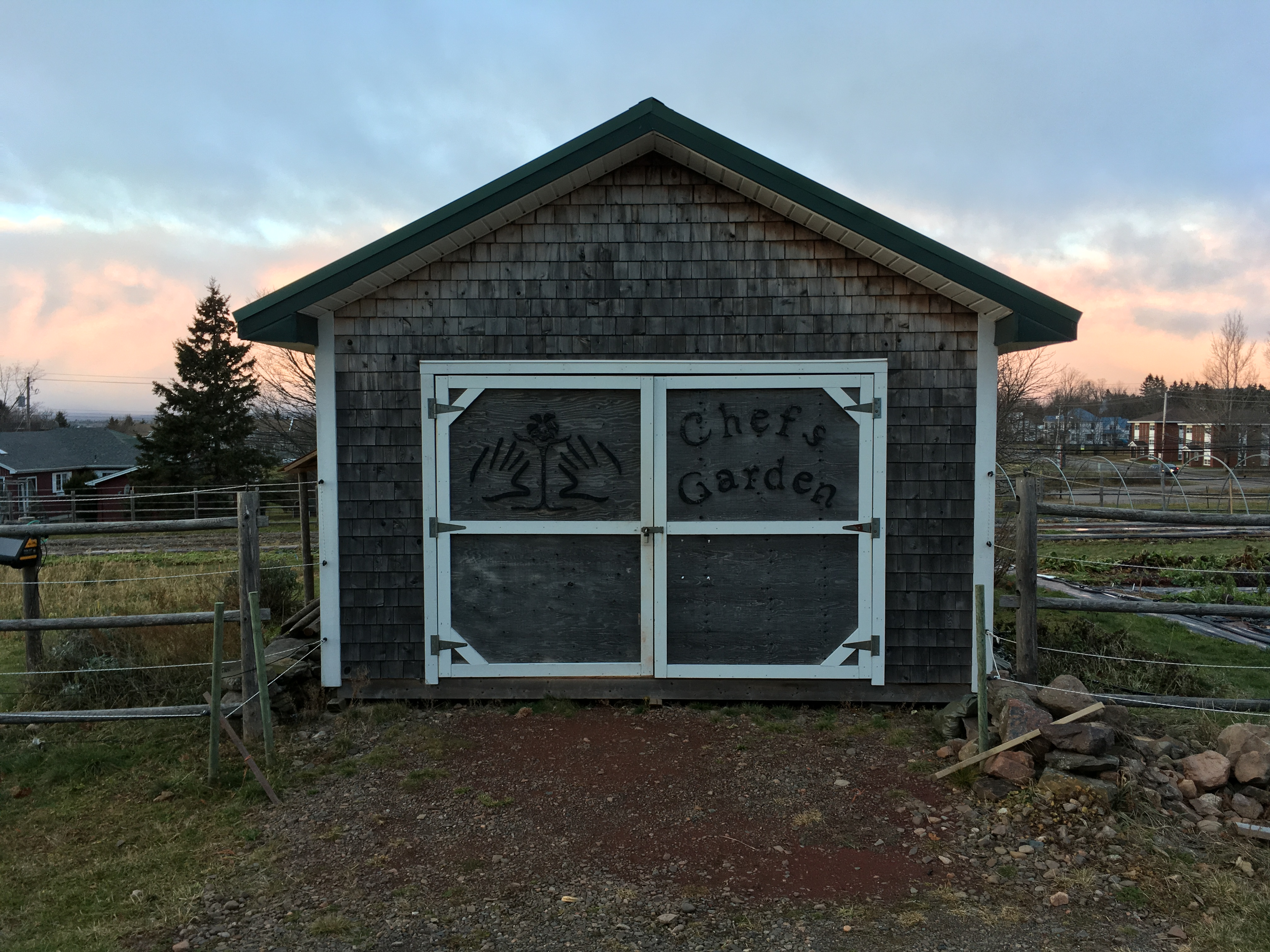

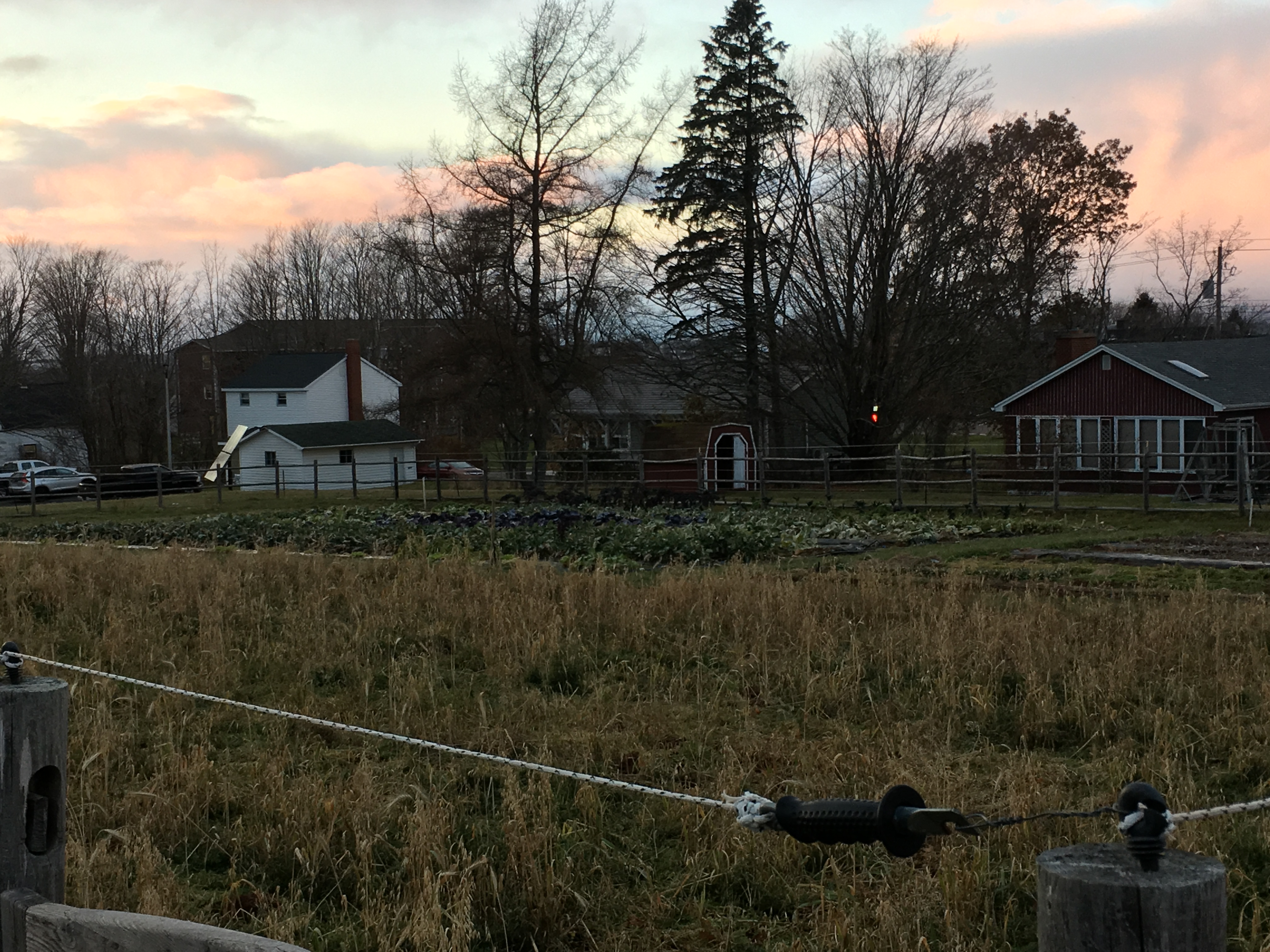

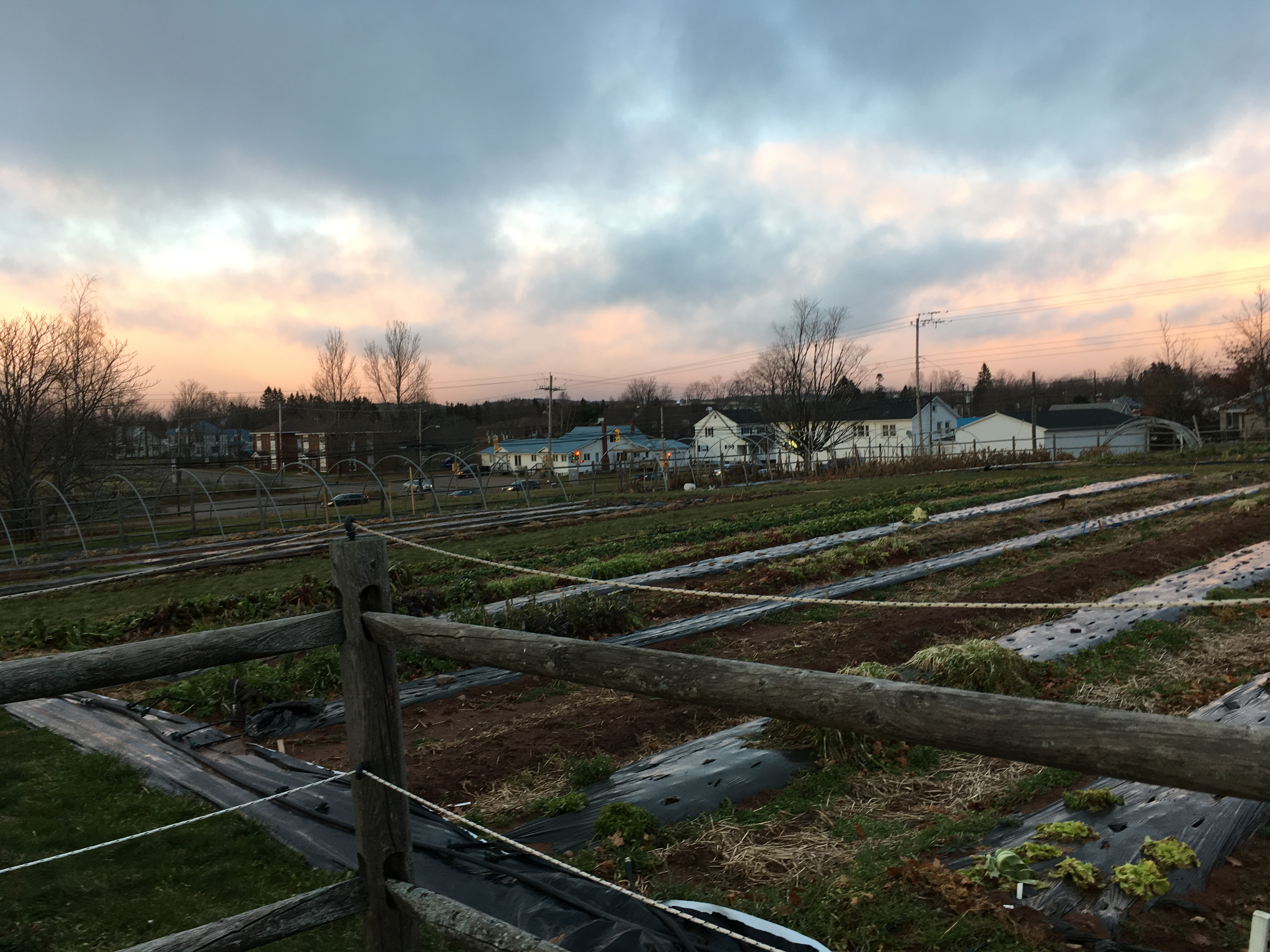

=== AC Community Garden ===
The AC Community Garden is located across the street from the Chef's Garden, and adjacent to the Alumni Garden. It features about 40 plots which are available for rent by students, faculty, and community members.

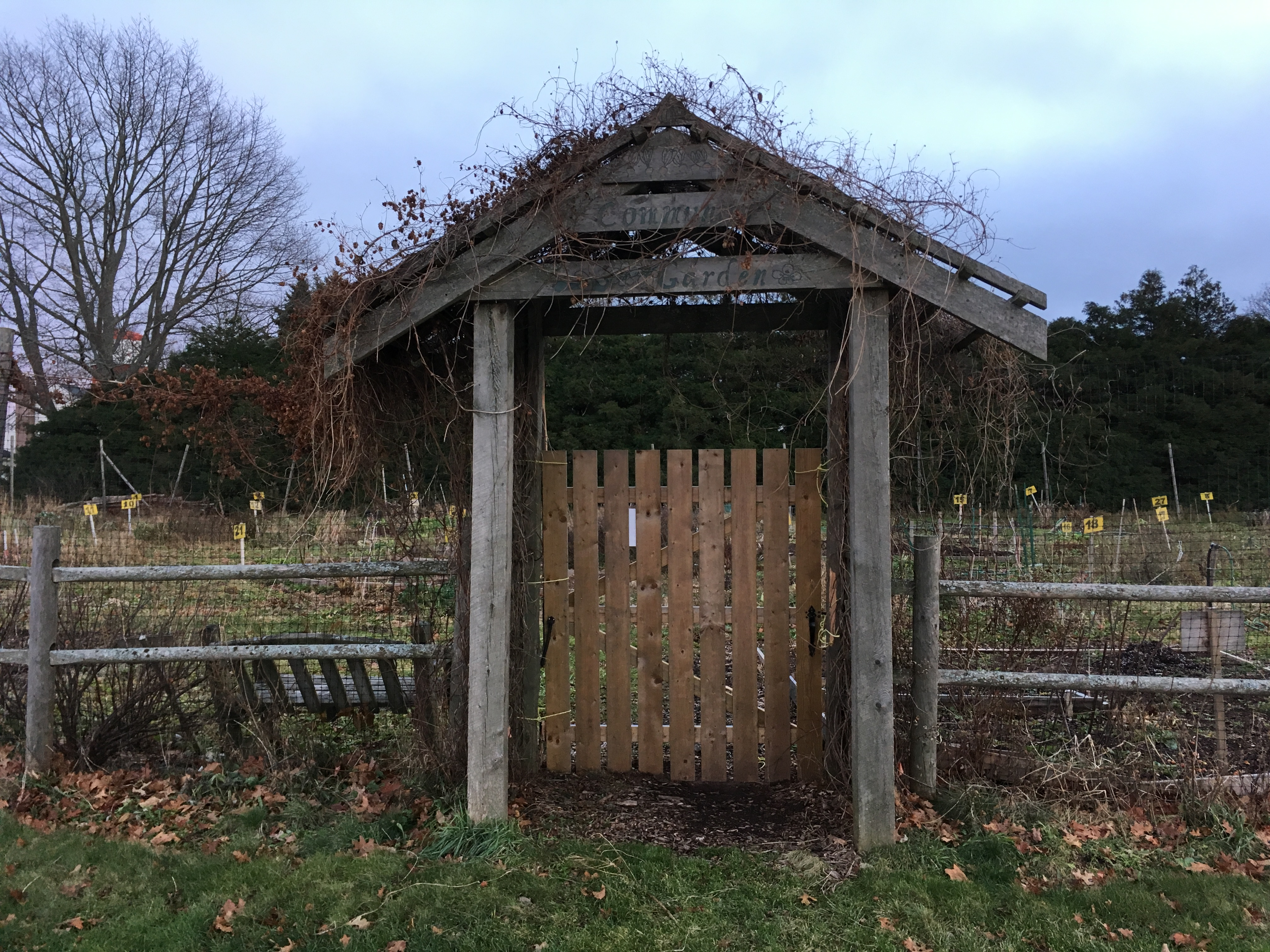

== See also ==
- List of agricultural universities and colleges
- List of universities in Nova Scotia

== Notes ==
^1 Enrollment Statistics 2011–12, NSAC Registry
