= John A. MacDonald (Nova Scotia politician) =

Canadian politician

John A. MacDonald MLA

Member of the Nova Scotia House of Assembly for Hants East
- Incumbent
- Assumed office August 17, 2021
- Preceded by: Margaret Miller

Personal details
- Born: January 25, 1979 (age 47) Halifax, Nova Scotia
- Party: Progressive Conservative
- Occupation: Software Developer

John A. MacDonald (born January 25, 1969) is a Canadian politician who was elected to the Nova Scotia House of Assembly in the 2021 Nova Scotia general election. He represents the riding of Hants East as a member of the Progressive Conservative Association of Nova Scotia.

On October 21, 2025, MacDonald was appointed to the Executive Council of Nova Scotia as Minister of Municipal Affairs.

He is a small business owner and active volunteer.

== Electoral record ==
=== 2017 ===
2017 Nova Scotia general election: Hants East
Party	Candidate	Votes	%	±%
Liberal	Margaret Miller	3,923	43.66	-3.73
Progressive Conservative	John A. MacDonald	3,104	34.55	+17.78
New Democratic	Liam Crouse	1,508	16.79	-19.05
Green	Jenn Kang	449	4.99	
Total valid votes		8,984	100	
Total rejected ballots		42		
Turnout		9,026	48.10	
Eligible voters		18,765		
Liberal hold		Swing		-10.76
Source: Elections Nova Scotia

=== 2021 ===
2021 Nova Scotia general election: Hants East
Party	Candidate	Votes	%	±%	Expenditures
Progressive Conservative	John A. MacDonald	3,328	37.36	+2.92	$28,841.01
Liberal	Michael Blois	3,239	36.36	-7.52	$39,363.22
New Democratic	Abby Cameron	2,142	24.05	+7.18	$33,859.54
Green	Simon Greenough	199	2.23	-2.58	$506.76
Total valid votes/expense limit		8,908	99.64	–	$99,761.07
Total rejected ballots		32	0.36		
Turnout		8,940	51.19		
Eligible voters		17,464			
Progressive Conservative gain from Liberal		Swing		+5.22	
Source: Elections Nova Scotia

=== 2024 ===
2024 Nova Scotia general election: Hants East
Party	Candidate	Votes	%	±%
Progressive Conservative	John A. MacDonald	4,614	62.69	+25.33
New Democratic	Abby Cameron	1,696	23.04	-1.01
Liberal	Shannon MacWilliam	1,050	14.27	-22.09
Total valid votes		7,360	–	
Total rejected ballots		40		
Turnout		7,403	38.66	
Eligible voters		19,148		
Progressive Conservative hold		Swing		
Source: Elections Nova Scotia
