= John MacDonell (Nova Scotia politician) =

Canadian politician

The Honourable John MacDonell ECNS

Member of the Nova Scotia House of Assembly for Hants East
- In office March 24, 1998 – October 8, 2013
- Preceded by: Bob Carruthers
- Succeeded by: Margaret Miller

Minister of Service Nova Scotia and Municipal Relations
- In office January 11, 2011 – October 22, 2013
- Premier: Darrell Dexter
- Preceded by: Ramona Jennex
- Succeeded by: Mark Furey

Minister of Agriculture
- In office January 11, 2011 – October 22, 2013
- Premier: Darrell Dexter
- Preceded by: Mark Parent
- Succeeded by: Keith Colwell

Minister of Natural Resources
- In office June 19, 2009 – January 11, 2011
- Premier: Darrell Dexter
- Preceded by: Carolyn Bolivar-Getson
- Succeeded by: Charlie Parker

Personal details
- Born: April 2, 1956 (age 70) Halifax, Nova Scotia, Canada
- Party: NDP
- Occupation: educator

John MacDonell (born April 2, 1956) is a Canadian retired educator and politician.

== Early life ==
A native of Halifax, MacDonell was educated at Acadia University and Saint Mary's University. MacDonell worked on a dairy farm and taught biology at Hants East Rural High School from 1985 to 1998.

== Political career ==
In 1998, MacDonell successfully ran for the Nova Scotia New Democratic Party nomination in the riding of Hants East. He was elected in the 1998 provincial election and was re-elected in the 1999, 2003, 2006 and 2009 provincial elections.

In 2002, MacDonell was a candidate for the leadership of the Nova Scotia NDP. At the leadership convention in June 2002, MacDonell was defeated by Darrell Dexter.

On June 19, 2009, MacDonell was appointed to the Executive Council of Nova Scotia, where he served first as Minister of Natural Resources until 2011. He then served as Minister of Agriculture. MacDonell was defeated in the 2013 provincial election.
