= Alfred E. Reid =

Canadian politician (1891–1955)

MLA for Hants East
- In office November 16, 1954 – October 7, 1955
- Preceded by: Ernest M. Ettinger
- Succeeded by: Ernest M. Ettinger

Personal details
- Born: November 28, 1891 Musquodoboit, Nova Scotia
- Died: October 7, 1955 (aged 63) Halifax, Nova Scotia
- Party: Nova Scotia Liberal Party
- Occupation: general merchant

Alfred Edward Reid (November 28, 1891 – October 7, 1955) was a Canadian politician. He represented the electoral district of Hants East in the Nova Scotia House of Assembly from 1954 to 1955. He was a member of the Nova Scotia Liberal Party.

Born in 1891 at Musquodoboit, Halifax County, Nova Scotia, Reid was a general merchant by career. He married Ruth Emma Kerr in 1913. Reid attempted to enter provincial politics in the 1953 election, and after trailing on election night, a recount resulted in Reid winning the Hants East riding by one vote over Progressive Conservative incumbent Ernest M. Ettinger. Ettinger appealed to the Supreme Court citing voting irregularities, and the election was voided in February 1954. A byelection was held on November 16, 1954, resulting in a tie between Reid and Ettinger which was broken when the returning officer cast the deciding vote for Reid, declaring him elected by one vote. Reid died in office on October 7, 1955.
