= Bob Carruthers (politician) =

Canadian politician

MLA for Hants East
- In office 1993–1998
- Preceded by: Jack Hawkins
- Succeeded by: John MacDonell

Personal details
- Party: Liberal
- Occupation: lawyer

Robert Arthur Carruthers is a former Canadian politician. He represented the electoral district of Hants East in the Nova Scotia House of Assembly from 1993 to 1998. He was a member of the Nova Scotia Liberal Party.

== Biography ==
A graduate of Saint Mary's University and Dalhousie Law School, Carruthers started his own law firm in 1980. After serving two terms as a municipal councillor, Carruthers entered provincial politics in the 1993 election, winning the Hants East riding by 638 votes. A backbench member of the John Savage government, Carruthers was named caucus whip in 1996. Carruthers did not re-offer in the 1998 election.
