= Margaret Miller (politician) =

Canadian politician

The Honourable Margaret Miller ECNS

Member of the Nova Scotia House of Assembly for Hants East
- In office October 8, 2013 – June 1, 2021
- Preceded by: John MacDonell
- Succeeded by: John A. MacDonald

Personal details
- Party: Liberal

Margaret Miller is a Canadian politician, who was elected to the Nova Scotia House of Assembly in the 2013 provincial election. A member of the Nova Scotia Liberal Party, she represented the electoral district of Hants East until 2021.

== Career ==
On January 12, 2016, Miller was appointed to the Executive Council of Nova Scotia as Minister of Environment.

Miller was re-elected in the 2017 election. On June 15, 2017, premier Stephen McNeil shuffled his cabinet, moving Miller to Minister of Natural Resources. On July 5, 2018, Miller returned to her former position as Minister of Environment in a cabinet shuffle.

On November 29, 2018, Miller announced that she will not run in the next election. On April 24, 2019, she was shuffled out of cabinet.

== Personal life ==
Miller married her husband Robert in 1972. They began farming at Rines Creek, and had three children. She ran a ceramics shop from her home until her dust allergy inhibited her ability to continue. Miller and her husband retired from farming in 1999, with Robert thereafter starting a logging company while Margaret opened a quilt shop out of their home.

In May 2004, Miller's youngest son Bruce was killed by a drunk driver. This lead her to join MADD Canada in Truro, later becoming the National President and spokesperson for the organization.

== Electoral record ==
2013 Nova Scotia general election
Party	Candidate	Votes	%	±%
Liberal	Margaret Miller	4,512	47.39	
New Democratic Party	John MacDonell	3,412	35.84	
Progressive Conservative	Kim Allan Williams	1,597	16.77	
