= G. Patrick Hunt =

Canadian politician

Patrick Hunt

MLA for Hants East
- In office 1978–1981
- Preceded by: Jack Hawkins
- Succeeded by: Jack Hawkins

Personal details
- Born: March 22, 1949 (age 77) Windsor, Nova Scotia
- Party: Progressive Conservative

G. Patrick Hunt (born March 22, 1949) is a Canadian politician, who served in the Nova Scotia House of Assembly from 1978 to 1981.

== Canadian military career ==
He served in the Canadian Navy for eight years, and received a BA in economics and political science from Royal Military College of Canada. During this period he spent two years in Victoria at Royal Roads Military College. He completed an exchange tour of duty in the Royal Navy Submarine Service in Hampshire, England, as well as serving as navigating officer of HMC Submarine Ojibwa in Halifax from 1974 to 1975. Hunt retired from the Canadian Armed Forces with the rank of Captain (Naval Lieutenant) in 1975.

== Nova Scotia MLA ==
Hunt was elected as a Progressive Conservative member of the Nova Scotia House of Assembly in 1978, representing the riding of Hants East, and served until 1981. At the time of his election, he was the youngest member of the government having been elected at the age of 29. He served as chairman of two committees of the legislature: Lands & Forests, and Tourism.

== Victoria life ==
Since 1983, Hunt has lived in Victoria, working in the high technology industry. He founded and continues to operate Compass Solutions, a business and technology consulting firm. He has held executive management and leadership positions in a number of companies. As part of the 1994 Victoria Commonwealth Games, he recruited and project managed a team of 70 workers.

He stood as a Reform Party candidate for Victoria in the 1993 federal election, and was the riding's Conservative Party candidate in the 2011 federal election.
