= Ernest M. Ettinger =

Canadian politician (1888–1962)

MLA for Hants East
- In office 1956–1962
- Preceded by: Alfred E. Reid
- Succeeded by: Albert J. Ettinger
- In office 1949–1953
- Preceded by: new riding
- Succeeded by: Alfred E. Reid

Personal details
- Born: July 30, 1888 Portland, Maine
- Died: May 29, 1962 (aged 73) Shubenacadie, Nova Scotia
- Party: Progressive Conservative
- Occupation: Funeral director

Ernest Milton Ettinger (July 30, 1888 – May 29, 1962) was a Canadian politician. He represented the electoral district of Hants East in the Nova Scotia House of Assembly from 1949 to 1953, and 1956 to 1962. He was a member of the Progressive Conservative Party of Nova Scotia.

Born in 1888 at Portland, Maine, Ettinger was a funeral director. In 1928, he started his own business, Ettinger Funeral Home in Shubenacadie, Nova Scotia. He married Margaret MacKenzie.

Ettinger entered provincial politics in the 1949 election, winning the Hants East riding by 28 votes over Liberal incumbent Robert A. MacLellan. In the 1953 election, after leading on election night, a recount resulted in Ettinger losing by one vote to Liberal Alfred E. Reid. Ettinger appealed to the Supreme Court citing irregularities, and the election was voided in February 1954. A byelection was held on November 16, 1954, resulting in a tie between Ettinger and Reid which was broken when the returning officer cast the deciding vote for Reid, declaring him elected by one vote. Ettinger regained the seat in the 1956 election, defeating the Liberal candidate by 50 votes. He was re-elected in 1960 by 219 votes. Ettinger died in office on May 29, 1962. He was succeeded as MLA by his son, Albert J. Ettinger.
