= Hants East =

Provincial electoral district in Nova Scotia, Canada

Nova Scotia electoral district
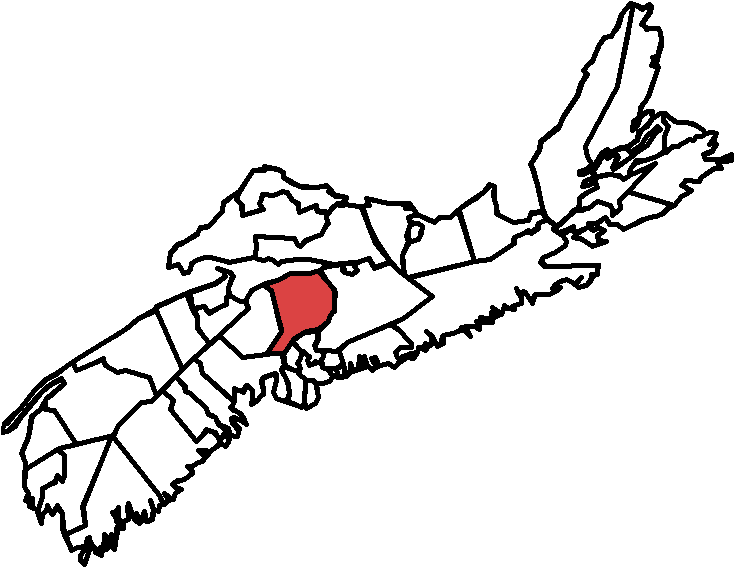

Provincial electoral district
- Legislature: Nova Scotia House of Assembly
MLA
John A. MacDonald
Progressive Conservative
- District created: 1949
- First contested: 1949
- Last contested: 2024

Demographics
- Population (2011): 23,266
- Electors: 17,303
- Area (km²): 1,653
- Pop. density (per km²): 14.1
- Census division: Hants County

Hants East is a provincial electoral district in Nova Scotia, Canada, that elects one member of the Nova Scotia House of Assembly. Its Member of the Legislative Assembly since 2021 has been John A. MacDonald of the Progressive Conservative Party.

The district has existed since 1949. Earlier, it and Hants West were together in Hants.

== Geography ==
The land area of Hants East is 1,653 km^{2} (638 sq mi).

== Members of the Legislative Assembly ==
This riding has elected the following members of the Legislative Assembly:

Hants East
Legislature	Years	Member	Party
Riding created from Hants
44th	1949–1953	Ernest Ettinger	Progressive Conservative
45th	1953–1956	Alfred E. Reid	Liberal
46th	1956–1960	Ernest Ettinger	Progressive Conservative
47th	1960–1962	Ernest Ettinger	Progressive Conservative
47th	1962–1963	Albert Ettinger	Progressive Conservative
48th	1963–1967	Albert Ettinger	Progressive Conservative
49th	1967–1970	Albert Ettinger	Progressive Conservative
50th	1970–1974	Jack Hawkins	Liberal
51st	1974–1978	Jack Hawkins	Liberal
52nd	1978–1981	G. Patrick Hunt	Progressive Conservative
53rd	1981–1984	Jack Hawkins	Liberal
54th	1984–1988	Cora Etter	Progressive Conservative
55th	1988–1993	Jack Hawkins	Liberal
56th	1993–1998	Bob Carruthers	Liberal
57th	1998–1999	John MacDonell	New Democratic
58th	1999–2003	John MacDonell	New Democratic
59th	2003–2006	John MacDonell	New Democratic
60th	2006–2009	John MacDonell	New Democratic
61st	2009–2013	John MacDonell	New Democratic
62nd	2013–2017	Margaret Miller	Liberal
63rd	2017–2021	Margaret Miller	Liberal
64th	2021–2024	John A. MacDonald	Progressive Conservative
65th	2024–present	John A. MacDonald	Progressive Conservative

== Election results ==
=== 2024 ===
2024 Nova Scotia general election
Party	Candidate	Votes	%	±%
Progressive Conservative	John A. MacDonald	4,614	62.69	+25.33
New Democratic	Abby Cameron	1,696	23.04	-1.01
Liberal	Shannon MacWilliam	1,050	14.27	-22.09
Total valid votes		7,360	–	
Total rejected ballots		40		
Turnout		7,403	38.66	
Eligible voters		19,148		
Progressive Conservative hold		Swing		
Source: Elections Nova Scotia

=== 2021 ===
2021 Nova Scotia general election
Party	Candidate	Votes	%	±%	Expenditures
Progressive Conservative	John A. MacDonald	3,328	37.36	+2.92	$28,841.01
Liberal	Michael Blois	3,239	36.36	-7.52	$39,363.22
New Democratic	Abby Cameron	2,142	24.05	+7.18	$33,859.54
Green	Simon Greenough	199	2.23	-2.58	$506.76
Total valid votes/expense limit		8,908	99.64	–	$99,761.07
Total rejected ballots		32	0.36		
Turnout		8,940	51.19		
Eligible voters		17,464			
Progressive Conservative gain from Liberal		Swing		+5.22	
Source: Elections Nova Scotia

=== 2017 ===
2017 provincial election redistributed results
Party	Vote	%
Liberal	3,500	43.88
Progressive Conservative	2,747	34.44
New Democratic	1,345	16.86
Green	384	4.81

2017 Nova Scotia general election
Party	Candidate	Votes	%	±%
Liberal	Margaret Miller	3,923	43.66	-3.73
Progressive Conservative	John A. MacDonald	3,104	34.55	+17.78
New Democratic	Liam Crouse	1,508	16.79	-19.05
Green	Jenn Kang	449	4.99	
Total valid votes		8,984	100	
Total rejected ballots		42		
Turnout		9,026	48.10	
Eligible voters		18,765		
Liberal hold		Swing		-10.76
Source: Elections Nova Scotia

=== 2013 ===
2013 Nova Scotia general election
Party	Candidate	Votes	%	±%
Liberal	Margaret Miller	4,512	47.39	31.64
New Democratic	John MacDonell	3,412	35.84	-29.12
Progressive Conservative	Kim Allan Williams	1,597	16.77	-0.05
Total		9,521	–	
Source(s) Source: Nova Scotia Legislature (2024). "Electoral History for Hants East" (PDF). nslegislature.ca. Nova Scotia, Chief Electoral Officer (2013). 39th Provincial General Election, October 8, 2013: Volume 1 – Statement of Votes & Statistics (PDF) (Report). Elections Nova Scotia. Archived from the original (PDF) on 10 April 2018.

=== 2009 ===
2009 Nova Scotia general election
Party	Candidate	Votes	%	±%
New Democratic	John MacDonell	6,052	64.96	11.82
Progressive Conservative	Todd Williams	1,567	16.82	-13.80
Liberal	Maurice Rees	1,467	15.75	1.80
Green	Emerich Winkler	231	2.48	0.18
Total		9,317	–	
Source(s) Source: Nova Scotia Legislature (2024). "Electoral History for Hants East" (PDF). nslegislature.ca.

=== 2006 ===
2006 Nova Scotia general election
Party	Candidate	Votes	%	±%
New Democratic	John MacDonell	4,712	53.13	-3.84
Progressive Conservative	Wayne Fiander	2,715	30.62	11.08
Liberal	Malcolm MacKay	1,237	13.95	-8.28
Green	Michael Hartlen	204	2.30	–
Total		8,868	–	
Source(s) Source: Nova Scotia Legislature (2024). "Electoral History for Hants East" (PDF). nslegislature.ca.

=== 2003 ===
2003 Nova Scotia general election
Party	Candidate	Votes	%	±%
New Democratic	John MacDonell	4,783	56.97	13.72
Liberal	Larry Matthews	1,866	22.23	-1.11
Progressive Conservative	Mary Lou LeRoy	1,640	19.54	-13.88
Nova Scotia Party	Ken Smith	106	1.26	–
Total		8,395	–	
Source(s) Source: Nova Scotia Legislature (2024). "Electoral History for Hants East" (PDF). nslegislature.ca.

=== 1999 ===
1999 Nova Scotia general election
Party	Candidate	Votes	%	±%
New Democratic	John MacDonell	3,985	43.25	-0.41
Progressive Conservative	Reese Morash	3,079	33.42	12.40
Liberal	Sara Stewart	2,150	23.33	-11.98
Total		9,214	–	
Source(s) Source: Nova Scotia Legislature (2024). "Electoral History for Hants East" (PDF). nslegislature.ca. Nova Scotia, Chief Electoral Officer (1999). Returns of the General Election for the House of Assembly, Thirty-Fifth General Election (Report). Elections Nova Scotia.

=== 1998 ===
1998 Nova Scotia general election
Party	Candidate	Votes	%	±%
New Democratic	John MacDonell	4,175	43.66	25.06
Liberal	Jim W. Smith	3,377	35.32	-8.65
Progressive Conservative	Lawrin Armstrong	2,010	21.02	-16.41
Total		9,562	–	
Source(s) Source: Nova Scotia Legislature (2024). "Electoral History for Hants East" (PDF). nslegislature.ca.

=== 1993 ===
1993 Nova Scotia general election
Party	Candidate	Votes	%	±%
Liberal	Bob Carruthers	4,295	43.97	-3.12
Progressive Conservative	Stephen MacKeil	3,657	37.43	-4.16
New Democratic	Terry MacLean	1,817	18.60	7.28
Total		9,769	–	
Source(s) Source: Nova Scotia Legislature (2024). "Electoral History for Hants East" (PDF). nslegislature.ca. Nova Scotia, Chief Electoral Officer (1993). Returns of the General Election for the House of Assembly, Thirty-Third General Election (PDF) (Report). Queen's Printer. Archived from the original (PDF) on 18 June 2018.

=== 1988 ===
1988 Nova Scotia general election
Party	Candidate	Votes	%	±%
Liberal	Jack Hawkins	4,502	47.09	5.52
Progressive Conservative	Cora Etter	3,977	41.60	-6.98
New Democratic	Richard Preeper	1,082	11.32	1.46
Total		9,561	–	
Source(s) Source: Nova Scotia Legislature (2024). "Electoral History for Hants East" (PDF). nslegislature.ca. Nova Scotia, Chief Electoral Officer (1988). Returns of the General Election for the House of Assembly, Thirty-Second General Election (PDF) (Report). Queen's Printer. Archived from the original (PDF) on 7 July 2018.

=== 1984 ===
1984 Nova Scotia general election
Party	Candidate	Votes	%	±%
Progressive Conservative	Cora Etter	3,730	48.57	10.19
Liberal	Jack Hawkins	3,192	41.57	2.44
New Democratic	Byron Radley	757	9.86	-12.62
Total		7,679	–	
Source(s) Source: Nova Scotia Legislature (2024). "Electoral History for Hants East" (PDF). nslegislature.ca. Nova Scotia, Chief Electoral Officer (1984). Returns of the General Election for the House of Assembly, Thirty-First General Election (PDF) (Report). Queen's Printer. Archived from the original (PDF) on 31 July 2017.

=== 1981 ===
1981 Nova Scotia general election
Party	Candidate	Votes	%	±%
Liberal	Jack Hawkins	3,041	39.13	-3.02
Progressive Conservative	G. Patrick Hunt	2,983	38.39	-13.25
New Democratic	Harry McNeil	1,747	22.48	16.26
Total		7,771	–	
Source(s) Source: Nova Scotia Legislature (2024). "Electoral History for Hants East" (PDF). nslegislature.ca. Nova Scotia, Chief Electoral Officer (1981). Returns of the General Election for the House of Assembly, Thirtieth General Election (PDF) (Report). Queen's Printer. Archived from the original (PDF) on 31 July 2017.

=== 1978 ===
1978 Nova Scotia general election
Party	Candidate	Votes	%	±%
Progressive Conservative	G. Patrick Hunt	4,035	51.63	11.24
Liberal	Jack Hawkins	3,294	42.15	-7.73
New Democratic	Clair White	486	6.22	-2.02
Total		7,815	–	
Source(s) Source: Nova Scotia Legislature (2024). "Electoral History for Hants East" (PDF). nslegislature.ca. Nova Scotia, Chief Electoral Officer (1978). Returns of the General Election for the House of Assembly, Twenty-Ninth General Election (PDF) (Report). Queen's Printer. Archived from the original (PDF) on 18 June 2018.

=== 1974 ===
1974 Nova Scotia general election
Party	Candidate	Votes	%	±%
Liberal	Jack Hawkins	3,322	49.88	-2.85
Progressive Conservative	Avard Ettinger	2,690	40.39	-6.88
New Democratic	Clare White	549	8.24	–
Independent	John G. Stanhope, Sr.	99	1.49	–
Total		6,660	–	
Source(s) Source: Nova Scotia Legislature (2024). "Electoral History for Hants East" (PDF). nslegislature.ca. Nova Scotia, Chief Electoral Officer (1974). Returns of the General Election for the House of Assembly, Twenty-Eighth General Election (PDF) (Report). Queen's Printer. Archived from the original (PDF) on 18 June 2018.

=== 1970 ===
1970 Nova Scotia general election
Party	Candidate	Votes	%	±%
Liberal	Jack Hawkins	3,115	52.73	4.80
Progressive Conservative	J. Albert Ettinger	2,793	47.27	-4.80
Total		5,908	–	
Source(s) Source: Nova Scotia Legislature (2024). "Electoral History for Hants East" (PDF). nslegislature.ca. Nova Scotia, Legislative Assembly (1970). Returns of the General Election for the House of Assembly, 1970 (PDF) (Report). Queen's Printer. Archived from the original (PDF) on 25 July 2018.

=== 1967 ===
1967 Nova Scotia general election
Party	Candidate	Votes	%	±%
Progressive Conservative	J. Albert Ettinger	2,697	52.08	-0.78
Liberal	Norman E. Casey	2,482	47.92	2.46
Total		5,179	–	
Source(s) Source: Nova Scotia Legislature (2024). "Electoral History for Hants East" (PDF). nslegislature.ca. Nova Scotia Legislature (1967). Returns of the General Election for the House of Assembly (PDF) (Report). Queen's Printer. Archived from the original (PDF) on 25 July 2018.

=== 1963 ===
1963 Nova Scotia general election
Party	Candidate	Votes	%	±%
Progressive Conservative	J. Albert Ettinger	2,739	52.86	2.11
Liberal	George E. Fraser	2,356	45.47	-3.79
New Democratic	Ralph Loomer	87	1.68	–
Total		5,182	–	
Source(s) Source: Nova Scotia Legislature (2024). "Electoral History for Hants East" (PDF). nslegislature.ca. Nova Scotia Legislature (1963). Returns of the General Election for the House of Assembly (PDF) (Report). Queen's Printer. Archived from the original (PDF) on 25 July 2018.

=== 1962 ===
Nova Scotia provincial by-election, 1962-08-27
Party	Candidate	Votes	%	±%
Progressive Conservative	J. Albert Ettinger	2,620	50.75	1.25
Liberal	Gerald Regan	2,543	49.25	4.22
Total		5,163	–	
Source(s) Source: Nova Scotia Legislature (2024). "Electoral History for Hants East" (PDF). nslegislature.ca.

=== 1960 ===
1960 Nova Scotia general election
Party	Candidate	Votes	%	±%
Progressive Conservative	Ernest M. Ettinger	2,426	49.50	-0.46
Liberal	Carl Spencer Grant	2,207	45.03	-3.88
Co-operative Commonwealth	Alfred James Scothorn	268	5.47	4.34
Total		4,901	–	
Source(s) Source: Nova Scotia Legislature (2024). "Electoral History for Hants East" (PDF). nslegislature.ca. Nova Scotia Legislature (1960). Returns of the General Election for the House of Assembly (PDF) (Report). Queen's Printer. Archived from the original (PDF) on 25 July 2018.

=== 1956 ===
1956 Nova Scotia general election
Party	Candidate	Votes	%	±%
Progressive Conservative	Ernest M. Ettinger	2,392	49.96	1.37
Liberal	Arthur W. MacKenzie	2,342	48.91	0.30
Co-operative Commonwealth	Malcolm F. Wheadon	54	1.13	-1.67
Total		4,788	–	
Source(s) Source: Nova Scotia Legislature (2024). "Electoral History for Hants East" (PDF). nslegislature.ca. Nova Scotia Legislature (1956). Returns of the General Election for the House of Assembly (PDF) (Report). Queen's Printer. Archived from the original (PDF) on 10 September 2018.

=== 1954 ===
Nova Scotia provincial by-election, 1954-11-16
Party	Candidate	Votes	%	±%
Liberal	Alfred E. Reid	2,257	48.61	-1.40
Progressive Conservative	Ernest M. Ettinger	2,256	48.59	-1.40
Co-operative Commonwealth	Malcolm F. Wheadon	130	2.80	–
Total		4,643	–	
Source(s) Source: Nova Scotia Legislature (2024). "Electoral History for Hants East" (PDF). nslegislature.ca.

=== 1953 ===
1953 Nova Scotia general election
Party	Candidate	Votes	%	±%
Liberal	Alfred E. Reid	2,251	50.01	3.39
Progressive Conservative	Ernest M. Ettinger	2,250	49.99	2.74
Total		4,501	–	
Source(s) Source: Nova Scotia Legislature (2024). "Electoral History for Hants East" (PDF). nslegislature.ca. Nova Scotia Legislature (1953). Returns of the General Election for the House of Assembly (PDF) (Report). Queen's Printer. Archived from the original (PDF) on 10 September 2018.

=== 1949 ===
1949 Nova Scotia general election
Party	Candidate	Votes	%	±%
Progressive Conservative	Ernest M. Ettinger	2,097	47.25	–
Liberal	Robert A. MacLellan	2,069	46.62	–
Co-operative Commonwealth	Johnston B. Hart	272	6.13	–
Total		4,438	–	
Source(s) Source: Nova Scotia Legislature (2024). "Electoral History for Hants East" (PDF). nslegislature.ca. Nova Scotia Legislature (1949). Returns of the General Election for the House of Assembly (PDF) (Report). Queen's Printer. Archived from the original (PDF) on 10 September 2018.

== See also ==
- List of Nova Scotia provincial electoral districts
- Canadian provincial electoral districts
