= J. Albert Ettinger =

Canadian politician (1919–2013)

MLA for Hants East
- In office 1962–1970
- Preceded by: Ernest M. Ettinger
- Succeeded by: Jack Hawkins

Personal details
- Born: April 18, 1919 Shubenacadie, Nova Scotia
- Died: April 23, 2013 (aged 94) Truro, Nova Scotia
- Party: Progressive Conservative
- Occupation: Funeral director

James Albert Ettinger (April 18, 1919 – April 23, 2013) was a Canadian politician. He represented the electoral district of Hants East in the Nova Scotia House of Assembly from 1962 to 1970. He was a member of the Nova Scotia Progressive Conservative Party.

Ettinger was born in Shubenacadie, Nova Scotia. He was a funeral director. In 1964, he married Florence Archibald.
