= Nova Scotia Agricultural College =

College in Nova Scotia, Canada

Coordinates: 45°22′15″N 63°15′26″W

- Former names: School of Agriculture, Truro (1885–1905); The School of Horticulture, Wolfville (1893–1905)
- Motto: Mens Agitat Molem (Latin)
- Motto in English: "Mind over Matter"
- Type: Public Agricultural College/University
- Active: 1905–2012
- Affiliations: CCAA, ACCC, AUCC, IAU, CBIE, CUP.
- Endowment: $3.049 million (as of December 31, 2010)
- Location: Bible Hill, Nova Scotia, Canada
- Campus: Urban
- Colors: Blue & gold
- Nickname: Rams

Nova Scotia Agricultural College (NSAC) was a publicly owned Canadian university college (founded 14 February 1905 and administered within the Nova Scotia Department of Agriculture) located at Bible Hill, Nova Scotia. The Nova Scotia Agricultural College merged with Dalhousie University and became Dalhousie's Faculty of Agriculture on 1 September 2012. The popular nickname remains the "AC".

== History ==
Nova Scotia Agricultural College was officially founded 14 February 1905 by the merger of The School of Agriculture (1885–1905) in Truro and The School of Horticulture (1893–1905) in Wolfville. NSAC was located on the provincial demonstration farm in Bible Hill along a bluff overlooking the north bank of the Salmon River; it expanded throughout the 20th century to a total area of 442 hectares (1,092 acres).

In the early years, NSAC focused on educating farmers in aspects of field and animal husbandry. These early graduates often went on to pursue a university degree, usually from Macdonald College at McGill University or the Ontario Agricultural College in Guelph, Ontario.

A bronze memorial plaque to the memory of former students of the Nova Scotia Agricultural College killed during the First World War was erected in Cumming Hall by their fellow students.

A disastrous fire in 1946 destroyed the science building and a temporary campus was set up in a former Canadian Army hospital at the Debert Military Camp. This temporary campus served students until the fall of 1953 when the new science building, now known as the Harlow Institute, was opened on the Bible Hill campus.

In 1980 the Government of Nova Scotia passed legislation authorizing NSAC to grant undergraduate B.Sc. (Agr.) degrees. The decision was made by the institution to do this in association with Dalhousie University and the first students graduated with the new degree in 1985. An agreement was later signed with Dalhousie University to grant M.Sc. degrees beginning in 1996. NSAC continued to grant its own diplomas for 2-year technology programs.

Throughout its history, the NSAC was an independent post-secondary research and education institution but it was directly funded by and administered by the provincial government's Department of Agriculture. In an op-ed piece on 20 May 2011, then Agriculture Minister John MacDonell announced that the province was exploring a new partnership with Dalhousie University. On 23 March 2012 the Government of Nova Scotia announced that it had reached an agreement with Dalhousie University that would merge NSAC into that institution effective 1 September 2012 to become that institution's Faculty of Agriculture.

== Programs ==
NSAC was the only university in Atlantic Canada that had a specific mandate to offer agricultural education. Throughout its history it offered specialized training at the Technical, Technology, Bachelor (after 1980), and Masters (after 1996) levels. Bachelor's degrees in Agricultural Mechanization, Engineering (with Dalhousie), Animal Science, Plant Science, Soil Science, Environmental Biology, Agricultural Economics, and Aquaculture are offered. Undergraduate degrees — B.Sc.(Agr)— are granted in association with Dalhousie University.

NSAC had also been associated with Brock University whereby NSAC students could receive a B.Sc. with a major in Viticulture & Oenology (granted by Brock).

NSAC offered a wide variety of technology programs, including a Diploma in Business Management with concentrations in Farming, Dairy Farming, Equine, Companion Animal, as well as Greenhouse & Nursery. It trained students in how to operate an agricultural business from both a financial standpoint as well as teaching proper plant growing and animal husbandry techniques.

== Noted alumni ==
- Donald Cameron, former Progressive Conservative Premier of Nova Scotia
- T.J. Harvey, a Canadian Liberal politician, who was elected to represent the riding of Tobique—Mactaquac in the house of commons in 2015
- Tom Dunphy, is a Canadian politician, teacher and realtor. He represented 3rd Queens in the Legislative Assembly of Prince Edward Island from 1986 to 1996 as a Liberal.
- Mark Eyking, a former Canadian politician for the Liberal party, represents the Sydney-Victoria riding in the house of commons.

== See also ==
- List of agricultural universities and colleges
- Higher education in Nova Scotia
- List of universities in Nova Scotia
- Dalhousie University Faculty of Agriculture

== Notes ==
^1 Enrollment Statistics 2011–12, NSAC Registry
