= Salmon River, Colchester County (community) =

Community in Nova Scotia, Canada

Coordinates: 44.050°N 66.167°W

Salmon River (formerly Meadowvale) is an unincorporated community in the Canadian province of Nova Scotia, located in Colchester County. Salmon River is located adjacent to Truro on the south side of the Salmon River, from which it derives its name.

Meadowvale Dairy Limited (1919) had a creamery on the Salmon River Road three miles from Truro. Twin City Dairy of Halifax eventually took over control briefly in the 1960s before becoming part of Farmer's Dairy Ltd. (1970) Farmer's Distribution Centere (Truro) occupied the location last, where they sold ice-cream until the early 2000s. As of 2022, the building has been demolished.

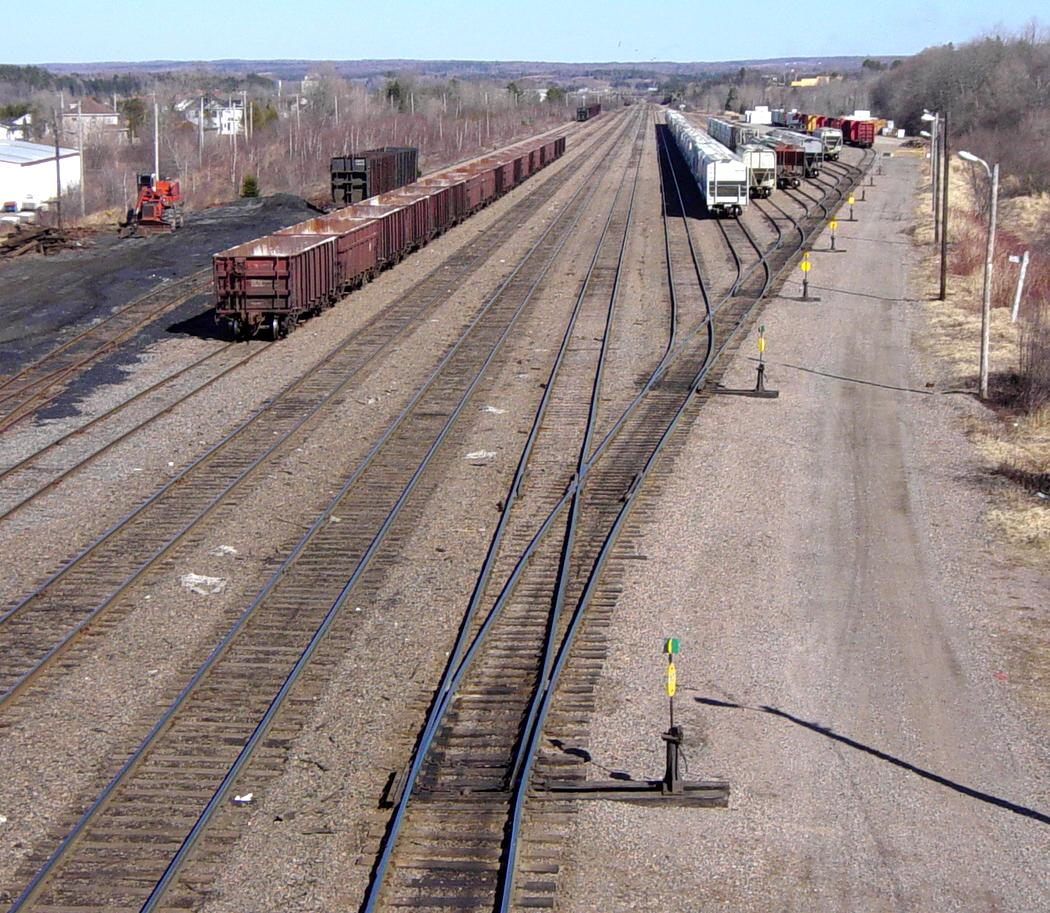
CN's Truro Yard in Salmon River

The defining feature in the community is Canadian National Railway's Truro Yard, located in the river flood plain. Once a large Hill, Andrew Moor'se Hill as it was called, stood just east of the round house and was removed in 1907, the fill used to construct the railyard which contained most of Truro's 19 miles of track.

Newer suburban developments in Salmon River range up the hill along the south side of the valley.

Salmon River was the winning entrant in the nationwide 2006 Hockeyville contest.

== Deuville rink ==
A privately owned outdoor community skating rink was created by local resident Webb Deuville in 1958. The Deuville family subsequently upgraded and covered the rink with a structure in 1989; however, in the mid-1990s the ice was still naturally frozen, limiting the skating season. Artificial icemaking equipment and structural insulation were added in 1997.

=== Hockeyville competition ===
The CBC Television network began advertising its inaugural season for the Hockeyville contest on January 8, 2006 and local residents of Salmon River persuaded the community to enter the Deuville rink into the competition. On March 29, Salmon River succeeded in the first round when the community was selected to be in the top 50 out of 450 initial entries. The list was subsequently narrowed on June 9 when Salmon River was placed in the top 5 communities, competing with Smithers, British Columbia, Airdrie, Alberta, Barry's Bay, Ontario, and Falher, Alberta. Salmon River won the competition during the final episode on June 11. The contest resulted in the local community being awarded the right to host an NHL pre-season exhibition game in fall 2006, $10,000 in hockey equipment, and $50,000 from Home Depot to repair the Deuville rink.
