= Bishopville, Nova Scotia =

Community in Nova Scotia, Canada

Coordinates: 45°1′49.91″N 64°14′38.45″W

Bishopville in Nova Scotia

Bishopville is a community in the Canadian province of Nova Scotia, located in Kings County.
