= Salmon River (Nova Scotia) =

River in Nova Scotia, Canada

Coordinates: 45°22′14.7″N 63°20′19.2″W

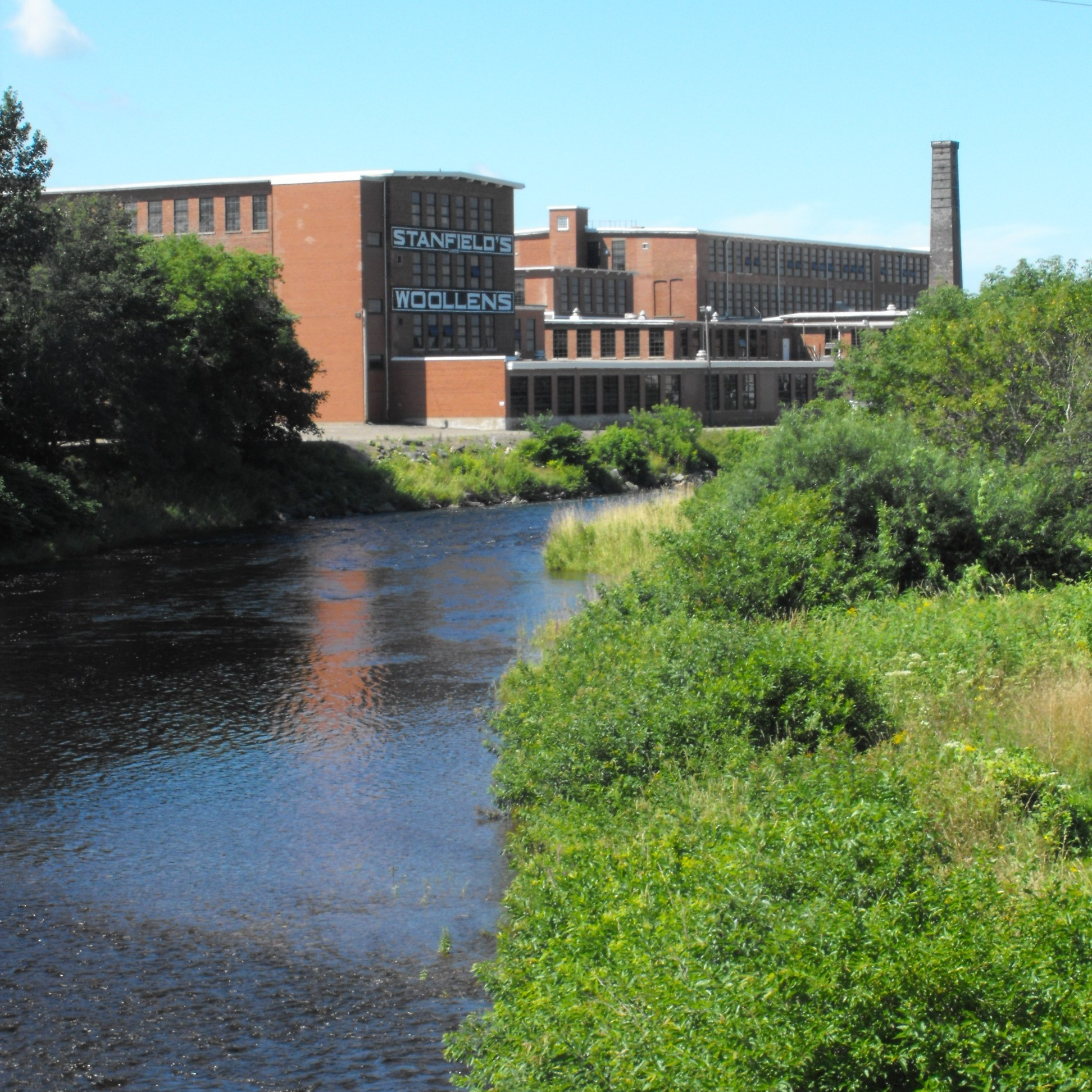
The Salmon River flows past Stanfield's woolen mills in Truro, Nova Scotia

The Salmon River (Mi'kmawi'simk: Plamui-sipu) is a Canadian river in central Nova Scotia's Colchester County.

Rising in the Cobequid Hills in the central-northeastern part of the county, the river descends through a broad glacial valley at the head of Cobequid Bay, the eastern extremity of the Bay of Fundy. The river discharges into the bay at a point between Lower Truro and Lower Onslow, the historic head of navigation.

A tidal bore is observed daily on the lower part of the river to the head of the tide at Truro.

The river is known for ice jams during the spring freshet. Poor planning has led to urban sprawl in Truro and the neighbouring areas of the county impacting the river's floodplain. During the 1869 Saxby Gale, the entire floodplain and significant areas of Truro were inundated by ocean waters.

The community of Salmon River takes its name from the river.

== See also ==
- List of rivers of Nova Scotia
