= Guysborough-Tracadie =

Provincial electoral district in Nova Scotia, Canada

Nova Scotia electoral district

Provincial electoral district
- Legislature: Nova Scotia House of Assembly
MLA
Greg Morrow
Progressive Conservative
- District created: 1867
- First contested: 1867
- Last contested: 2024

Demographics
- Electors: 10,189
- Area (km²): 4,332
- Census division(s): Guysborough County, Antigonish
- Census subdivision(s): Antigonish, Sudb. B, Guysborough, Mulgrave, St. Mary's

Guysborough-Tracadie is a provincial electoral district in Nova Scotia, Canada, that elects one member of the Nova Scotia House of Assembly.

It was created in 1867 as Guysborough. It included all of Guysborough County and elected two members to the House of Assembly. In 1933, the number of members elected was reduced to one. In 1993, the name was changed to Guysborough–Port Hawkesbury as the town of Port Hawkesbury was added to the district. In 2003 it was renamed Guysborough–Sheet Harbour as it gained an eastern area from Eastern Shore and lost Port Hawkesbury to Inverness. In 2013, following the recommendations of the 2012 Electoral Boundaries Commission, the district was renamed Guysborough–Eastern Shore–Tracadie and gained the area east of the Tracadie River from Antigonish. Following the 2019 electoral boundary review, it lost territory to Eastern Shore, and was renamed Guysborough-Tracadie.

== Geography ==
The land area of Guysborough-Tracadie is 4,332 km^{2} (1,673 sq mi).

== Members of the Legislative Assembly ==
This riding has elected the following members of the Legislative Assembly:

Guysborough-Tracadie
Legislature	Years	Member	Party
Guysborough County elects a single member
40th	1933–1937	Clarence W. Anderson	Liberal
41st	1937–1941	Havelock Torrey	Liberal
42nd	1941–1945	Havelock Torrey	Liberal
43rd	1945–1949	Arthur W. MacKenzie	Liberal
44th	1949–1953	Arthur W. MacKenzie	Liberal
45th	1953–1956	Arthur W. MacKenzie	Liberal
46th	1956–1960	Alexander W. Cameron	Liberal
47th	1960–1963	Alexander MacIsaac	Progressive Conservative
48th	1963–1967	Alexander MacIsaac	Progressive Conservative
49th	1967–1969	Alexander MacIsaac	Progressive Conservative
49th	1969–1970	Angus MacIsaac	Progressive Conservative
50th	1970–1973	Angus MacIsaac	Progressive Conservative
50th	1973–1974	Sandy Cameron	Liberal
51st	1974–1978	Sandy Cameron	Liberal
52nd	1978–1981	Sandy Cameron	Liberal
53rd	1981–1984	Sandy Cameron	Liberal
54th	1984–1988	Chuck MacNeil	Progressive Conservative
55th	1988–1993	Chuck MacNeil	Progressive Conservative
District's name is changed to Guysborough–Port Hawkesbury
56th	1993–1998	Ray White	Liberal
57th	1998–1999	Ray White	Liberal
58th	1999–2003	Ron Chisholm	Progressive Conservative
District's name is changed to Guysborough–Sheet Harbour
59th	2003–2006	Ron Chisholm	Progressive Conservative
60th	2006–2009	Ron Chisholm	Progressive Conservative
61st	2009–2013	Jim Boudreau	New Democratic
District's name is changed to Guysborough–Eastern Shore–Tracadie
62nd	2013–2017	Lloyd Hines	Liberal
63rd	2017–2021	Lloyd Hines	Liberal
District's name is changed to Guysborough-Tracadie
64th	2021–2024	Greg Morrow	Progressive Conservative
65th	2024–present	Greg Morrow	Progressive Conservative

== Election results ==
=== 2024 ===
2024 Nova Scotia general election
Party	Candidate	Votes	%	±%
Progressive Conservative	Greg Morrow	3,128	77.46%	+14.08%
Liberal	George Grant	590	14.61%	-15.74%
New Democratic	Deborah Martinello	320	7.92%	+3.15%
Total valid votes		4,078		
Total rejected ballots		37		
Total declined ballots		3		
Turnout		4,078		
Eligible voters		8,018		
Progressive Conservative hold		Swing		
Source: Elections Nova Scotia

=== 2021 ===
2021 Nova Scotia general election
Party	Candidate	Votes	%	±%	Expenditures
Progressive Conservative	Greg Morrow	3,281	63.39	+20.98	$40,621.88
Liberal	Lloyd Hines	1,571	30.35	-12.96	$41,669.45
New Democratic	Matt Stickland	247	4.77	-9.51	$13,174.92
Green	Gabriel Bruce	77	1.49	–	$200.00
Total valid votes/expense limit		5,176	99.75	–	$49,031.47
Total rejected ballots		13	0.25		
Turnout		5,189	66.81		
Eligible voters		7,767			
Progressive Conservative gain from Liberal		Swing		+16.97	
Source: Elections Nova Scotia

=== 2017 ===
2017 provincial election redistributed results
Party	Vote	%
Liberal	2,053	43.31
Progressive Conservative	2,010	42.41
New Democratic	677	14.28

2017 Nova Scotia general election: Guysborough–Eastern Shore–Tracadie
Party	Candidate	Votes	%	±%
Liberal	Lloyd Hines	2,565	43.09%	3.09%
Progressive Conservative	Rob Wolf	2,494	41.89%	14.82%
New Democratic	Marnie J. Simmon	894	15.02%	-17.90%
Total valid votes		5,953	100.0	
Total rejected ballots		65	1.08	
Turnout		6,018	59.05	
Eligible voters		10,189		
Liberal hold		Swing		-5.86
Source: Elections Nova Scotia

=== 2013 ===
2013 Nova Scotia general election: Guysborough-Eastern Shore-Tracadie
Party	Candidate	Votes	%	±%
Liberal	Lloyd Hines	2,876	40.00%	17.78%
New Democratic	Jim Boudreau	2,367	32.92%	-18.72%
Progressive Conservative	Neil F. DeCoff	1,947	27.08%	2.12%
Total		7,190	–	
Source(s) Source: Nova Scotia Legislature (2024). "Electoral History for Guysborough-Eastern Shore-Tracadie" (PDF). nslegislature.ca. Nova Scotia, Chief Electoral Officer (2013). 39th Provincial General Election, October 8, 2013: Volume 1 – Statement of Votes & Statistics (PDF) (Report). Elections Nova Scotia. Archived from the original (PDF) on 10 April 2018.

=== 2009 ===
2009 Nova Scotia general election: Guysborough-Sheet Harbour
Party	Candidate	Votes	%	±%
New Democratic	Jim Boudreau	3,621	51.64%	14.13%
Progressive Conservative	Ron Chisholm	1,750	24.96%	-15.88%
Liberal	Lloyd Hines	1,558	22.22%	1.87%
Green	Amy Florian	83	1.18%	-0.12%
Total		7,012	–	
Source(s) Source: Nova Scotia Legislature (2024). "Electoral History for Guysborough-Sheet Harbour" (PDF). nslegislature.ca.

=== 2006 ===
2006 Nova Scotia general election: Guysborough-Sheet Harbour
Party	Candidate	Votes	%	±%
Progressive Conservative	Ron Chisholm	2,765	40.84%	2.84%
New Democratic	Jim Boudreau	2,540	37.51%	7.80%
Liberal	Dave Horton	1,378	20.35%	-11.94%
Green	Marike Finlay	88	1.30%	–
Total		6,771	–	
Source(s) Source: Nova Scotia Legislature (2024). "Electoral History for Guysborough-Sheet Harbour" (PDF). nslegislature.ca.

=== 2003 ===
2003 Nova Scotia general election: Guysborough-Sheet Harbour
Party	Candidate	Votes	%	±%
Progressive Conservative	Ron Chisholm	2,587	37.99%	-3.90%
Liberal	Gordon MacDonald	2,199	32.30%	-7.89%
New Democratic	Jim Boudreau	2,023	29.71%	13.55%
Total		6,809	–	
Source(s) Source: Nova Scotia Legislature (2024). "Electoral History for Guysborough-Sheet Harbour" (PDF). nslegislature.ca.

=== 1999 ===
1999 Nova Scotia general election: Guysborough-Port Hawkesbury
Party	Candidate	Votes	%	±%
Progressive Conservative	Ron Chisholm	3,285	41.90%	8.06%
Liberal	Ray White	3,151	40.19%	-2.62%
New Democratic	Wendy Panagopoulos	1,267	16.16%	-7.20%
Nova Scotia Party	Courtney Kinney	138	1.76%	–
Total		7,841	–	
Source(s) Source: Nova Scotia Legislature (2024). "Electoral History for Guysborough-Port Hawkesbury" (PDF). nslegislature.ca. Nova Scotia, Chief Electoral Officer (1999). Returns of the General Election for the House of Assembly, Thirty-Fifth General Election (Report). Elections Nova Scotia.

=== 1998 ===
1998 Nova Scotia general election: Guysborough-Port Hawkesbury
Party	Candidate	Votes	%	±%
Liberal	Ray White	3,438	42.81%	-13.74%
Progressive Conservative	Ron Chisholm	2,717	33.83%	0.50%
New Democratic	Wendy Panagopoulos	1,876	23.36%	13.24%
Total		8,031	–	
Source(s) Source: Nova Scotia Legislature (2024). "Electoral History for Guysborough-Port Hawkesbury" (PDF). nslegislature.ca.

=== 1993 ===
1993 Nova Scotia general election: Guysborough-Port Hawkesbury
Party	Candidate	Votes	%	±%
Liberal	Ray White	5,487	56.55%	11.62%
Progressive Conservative	Chuck MacNeil	3,234	33.33%	-15.19%
New Democratic	Frank X. Fraser	982	10.12%	3.58%
Total		9,703	–	
Source(s) Source: Nova Scotia Legislature (2024). "Electoral History for Guysborough-Port Hawkesbury" (PDF). nslegislature.ca. Nova Scotia, Chief Electoral Officer (1993). Returns of the General Election for the House of Assembly, Thirty-Third General Election (PDF) (Report). Queen's Printer. Archived from the original (PDF) on 18 June 2018.

=== 1988 ===
1988 Nova Scotia general election: Guysborough
Party	Candidate	Votes	%	±%
Progressive Conservative	Chuck MacNeil	3,730	48.52%	-2.17%
Liberal	Joe Sullivan	3,454	44.93%	-0.64%
New Democratic	Sarah Wilson	503	6.54%	2.81%
Total		7,687	–	
Source(s) Source: Nova Scotia Legislature (2024). "Electoral History for Guysborough" (PDF). nslegislature.ca. Nova Scotia, Chief Electoral Officer (1988). Returns of the General Election for the House of Assembly, Thirty-Second General Election (PDF) (Report). Queen's Printer. Archived from the original (PDF) on 7 July 2018.

=== 1984 ===
1984 Nova Scotia general election: Guysborough
Party	Candidate	Votes	%	±%
Progressive Conservative	Chuck MacNeil	3,859	50.70%	7.94%
Liberal	Sandy Cameron	3,469	45.57%	-5.46%
New Democratic	Elsie Richard	284	3.73%	-2.48%
Total		7,612	–	
Source(s) Source: Nova Scotia Legislature (2024). "Electoral History for Guysborough" (PDF). nslegislature.ca. Nova Scotia, Chief Electoral Officer (1984). Returns of the General Election for the House of Assembly, Thirty-First General Election (PDF) (Report). Queen's Printer. Archived from the original (PDF) on 31 July 2017.

=== 1981 ===
1981 Nova Scotia general election: Guysborough
Party	Candidate	Votes	%	±%
Liberal	Sandy Cameron	3,723	51.03%	3.16%
Progressive Conservative	Jim Johnson	3,119	42.76%	-4.93%
New Democratic	Art Livingston	453	6.21%	1.76%
Total		7,295	–	
Source(s) Source: Nova Scotia Legislature (2024). "Electoral History for Guysborough" (PDF). nslegislature.ca. Nova Scotia, Chief Electoral Officer (1981). Returns of the General Election for the House of Assembly, Thirtieth General Election (PDF) (Report). Queen's Printer. Archived from the original (PDF) on 31 July 2017.

=== 1978 ===
1978 Nova Scotia general election: Guysborough
Party	Candidate	Votes	%	±%
Liberal	Sandy Cameron	3,306	47.87%	-7.79%
Progressive Conservative	Jim Johnson	3,293	47.68%	7.66%
New Democratic	Kevin Patrick Keeping	307	4.45%	0.13%
Total		6,906	–	
Source(s) Source: Nova Scotia Legislature (2024). "Electoral History for Guysborough" (PDF). nslegislature.ca. Nova Scotia, Chief Electoral Officer (1978). Returns of the General Election for the House of Assembly, Twenty-Ninth General Election (PDF) (Report). Queen's Printer. Archived from the original (PDF) on 18 June 2018.

=== 1974 ===
1974 Nova Scotia general election: Guysborough
Party	Candidate	Votes	%	±%
Liberal	Sandy Cameron	3,688	55.66%	5.59%
Progressive Conservative	Fenwick MacIntosh	2,652	40.02%	-0.09%
New Democratic	William H. (Bill) Sugg	286	4.32%	-5.50%
Total		6,626	–	
Source(s) Source: Nova Scotia Legislature (2024). "Electoral History for Guysborough" (PDF). nslegislature.ca. Nova Scotia, Chief Electoral Officer (1974). Returns of the General Election for the House of Assembly, Twenty-Eighth General Election (PDF) (Report). Queen's Printer. Archived from the original (PDF) on 18 June 2018.

=== 1973 ===
Nova Scotia provincial by-election, 1973-06-05: Guysborough
Party	Candidate	Votes	%	±%
Liberal	Sandy Cameron	3,362	50.07%	6.40%
Progressive Conservative	Donald E. Curtis	2,693	40.11%	-7.75%
New Democratic	William H. (Bill) Sugg	659	9.82%	1.35%
Total		6,714	–	
Source(s) Source: Nova Scotia Legislature (2024). "Electoral History for Guysborough" (PDF). nslegislature.ca.

=== 1970 ===
1970 Nova Scotia general election: Guysborough
Party	Candidate	Votes	%	±%
Progressive Conservative	Angus MacIsaac	3,035	47.86%	-5.23%
Liberal	Russell Pellerin	2,770	43.68%	-3.24%
New Democratic	Allison Newell	537	8.47%	–
Total		6,342	–	
Source(s) Source: Nova Scotia Legislature (2024). "Electoral History for Guysborough" (PDF). nslegislature.ca. Nova Scotia, Legislative Assembly (1970). Returns of the General Election for the House of Assembly, 1970 (PDF) (Report). Queen's Printer. Archived from the original (PDF) on 25 July 2018.

=== 1969 ===
Nova Scotia provincial by-election, 1969-02-11: Guysborough
Party	Candidate	Votes	%	±%
Progressive Conservative	Angus MacIsaac	3,198	53.09%	0.34%
Liberal	Alick G. Anderson	2,826	46.91%	-0.34%
Total		6,024	–	
Source(s) Source: Nova Scotia Legislature (2024). "Electoral History for Guysborough" (PDF). nslegislature.ca.

=== 1967 ===
1967 Nova Scotia general election: Guysborough
Party	Candidate	Votes	%	±%
Progressive Conservative	Alexander MacIsaac	3,154	52.75%	-0.11%
Liberal	Donald J. Gillis	2,825	47.25%	0.11%
Total		5,979	–	
Source(s) Source: Nova Scotia Legislature (2024). "Electoral History for Guysborough" (PDF). nslegislature.ca. Nova Scotia Legislature (1967). Returns of the General Election for the House of Assembly (PDF) (Report). Queen's Printer. Archived from the original (PDF) on 25 July 2018.

=== 1963 ===
1963 Nova Scotia general election: Guysborough
Party	Candidate	Votes	%	±%
Progressive Conservative	Alexander MacIsaac	3,229	52.86%	2.88%
Liberal	Thomas Edwin Kirk	2,880	47.14%	0.19%
Total		6,109	–	
Source(s) Source: Nova Scotia Legislature (2024). "Electoral History for Guysborough" (PDF). nslegislature.ca. Nova Scotia Legislature (1963). Returns of the General Election for the House of Assembly (PDF) (Report). Queen's Printer. Archived from the original (PDF) on 25 July 2018.

=== 1960 ===
1960 Nova Scotia general election: Guysborough
Party	Candidate	Votes	%	±%
Progressive Conservative	Alexander MacIsaac	3,123	49.98%	1.32%
Liberal	Norman Robert Anderson	2,934	46.95%	-4.39%
Co-operative Commonwealth	Leslie Wilfred Myers	192	3.07%	–
Total		6,249	–	
Source(s) Source: Nova Scotia Legislature (2024). "Electoral History for Guysborough" (PDF). nslegislature.ca. Nova Scotia Legislature (1960). Returns of the General Election for the House of Assembly (PDF) (Report). Queen's Printer. Archived from the original (PDF) on 25 July 2018.

=== 1956 ===
1956 Nova Scotia general election: Guysborough
Party	Candidate	Votes	%	±%
Liberal	Alexander W. Cameron	3,177	51.34%	-4.95%
Progressive Conservative	R. S Kaiser	3,011	48.66%	4.95%
Total		6,188	–	
Source(s) Source: Nova Scotia Legislature (2024). "Electoral History for Guysborough" (PDF). nslegislature.ca. Nova Scotia Legislature (1956). Returns of the General Election for the House of Assembly (PDF) (Report). Queen's Printer. Archived from the original (PDF) on 10 September 2018.

=== 1953 ===
1953 Nova Scotia general election: Guysborough
Party	Candidate	Votes	%	±%
Liberal	Arthur W. MacKenzie	3,470	56.29%	-7.90%
Progressive Conservative	A. Grant MacDonald	2,694	43.71%	7.90%
Total		6,164	–	
Source(s) Source: Nova Scotia Legislature (2024). "Electoral History for Guysborough" (PDF). nslegislature.ca. Nova Scotia Legislature (1953). Returns of the General Election for the House of Assembly (PDF) (Report). Queen's Printer. Archived from the original (PDF) on 10 September 2018.

=== 1949 ===
1949 Nova Scotia general election: Guysborough
Party	Candidate	Votes	%	±%
Liberal	Arthur W. MacKenzie	4,041	64.19%	2.12%
Progressive Conservative	Hugh A. K. Forbes	2,254	35.81%	-2.12%
Total		6,295	–	
Source(s) Source: Nova Scotia Legislature (2024). "Electoral History for Guysborough" (PDF). nslegislature.ca. Nova Scotia Legislature (1949). Returns of the General Election for the House of Assembly (PDF) (Report). Queen's Printer. Archived from the original (PDF) on 10 September 2018.

=== 1945 ===
1945 Nova Scotia general election: Guysborough
Party	Candidate	Votes	%	±%
Liberal	Arthur W. MacKenzie	3,456	62.07%	-2.08%
Progressive Conservative	Harold Vana Hudson	2,112	37.93%	2.08%
Total		5,568	–	
Source(s) Source: Nova Scotia Legislature (2024). "Electoral History for Guysborough" (PDF). nslegislature.ca. Nova Scotia Legislature (1945). Returns of the General Election for the House of Assembly (PDF) (Report). Queen's Printer. Archived from the original (PDF) on 10 September 2018.

=== 1941 ===
1941 Nova Scotia general election: Guysborough
Party	Candidate	Votes	%	±%
Liberal	Havelock Torrey	3,759	64.15%	6.34%
Progressive Conservative	John Donald McIntyre	2,101	35.85%	-6.34%
Total		5,860	–	
Source(s) Source: Nova Scotia Legislature (2024). "Electoral History for Guysborough" (PDF). nslegislature.ca. Nova Scotia Legislature (1941). Returns of the General Election for the House of Assembly (PDF) (Report). Queen's Printer. Archived from the original (PDF) on 8 February 2024.

=== 1937 ===
1937 Nova Scotia general election: Guysborough
Party	Candidate	Votes	%	±%
Liberal	Havelock Torrey	4,368	57.81%	1.25%
Progressive Conservative	Howard Amos Rice	3,188	42.19%	–
Total		7,556	–	
Source(s) Source: Nova Scotia Legislature (2024). "Electoral History for Guysborough" (PDF). nslegislature.ca. Nova Scotia Legislature (1937). Returns of the General Election for the House of Assembly (PDF) (Report). Queen's Printer. Archived from the original (PDF) on 1 March 2019.

=== 1933 ===
1933 Nova Scotia general election: Guysborough
Party	Candidate	Votes	%	±%
Liberal	Clarence W. Anderson	4,437	56.56%	4.06%
Liberal-Conservative	Leonard William Fraser	3,408	43.44%	-4.06%
Total		7,845	–	
Source(s) Source: Nova Scotia Legislature (2024). "Electoral History for Guysborough" (PDF). nslegislature.ca. Nova Scotia Legislature (1933). Returns of the General Election for the House of Assembly (PDF) (Report). Queen's Printer. Archived from the original (PDF) on 1 March 2019.

=== 1928 ===
1928 Nova Scotia general election: Guysborough
Party	Candidate	Votes	%	Elected
Liberal	Clarence W. Anderson	3,337	26.43%	✓
Liberal	Michael Edward Morrison	3,293	26.08%	✓
Liberal-Conservative	Howard Amos Rice	3,018	23.90%	
Liberal-Conservative	Simon Osborn Giffin	2,980	23.60%	
Total		12,628	–	
Source(s) Source: Nova Scotia Legislature (2024). "Electoral History for Guysborough" (PDF). nslegislature.ca.

=== 1925 ===
1925 Nova Scotia general election: Guysborough
Party	Candidate	Votes	%	Elected
Liberal-Conservative	Simon Osborn Giffin	2,995	26.61%	✓
Liberal-Conservative	Howard Amos Rice	2,830	25.14%	✓
Liberal	James Cranswick Tory	2,763	24.55%	
Liberal	Clarence W. Anderson	2,668	23.70%	
Total		11,256	–	
Source(s) Source: Nova Scotia Legislature (2024). "Electoral History for Guysborough" (PDF). nslegislature.ca.

=== 1920 ===
1920 Nova Scotia general election: Guysborough
Party	Candidate	Votes	%	Elected
Liberal	James Cranswick Tory	2,619	33.71%	✓
Liberal	Clarence W. Anderson	2,359	30.36%	✓
United Farmers	D. P. Floyd	1,483	19.09%	
United Farmers	J. A. Dillon	1,309	16.85%	
Total		7,770	–	
Source(s) Source: Nova Scotia Legislature (2024). "Electoral History for Guysborough" (PDF). nslegislature.ca.

=== 1916 ===
1916 Nova Scotia general election: Guysborough
Party	Candidate	Votes	%	Elected
Liberal	James Cranswick Tory	1,827	30.92%	✓
Liberal	James F. Ellis	1,752	29.65%	✓
Liberal-Conservative	Duncan S. Chisholm	1,236	20.92%	
Liberal-Conservative	John Bell	1,093	18.50%	
Total		5,908	–	
Source(s) Source: Nova Scotia Legislature (2024). "Electoral History for Guysborough" (PDF). nslegislature.ca.

=== 1911 ===
1911 Nova Scotia general election: Guysborough
Party	Candidate	Votes	%	Elected
Liberal	James Cranswick Tory	1,860	26.97%	✓
Liberal	James F. Ellis	1,794	26.01%	✓
Liberal-Conservative	George Taylor MacNutt	1,625	23.56%	
Liberal-Conservative	J. S. Wells	1,618	23.46%	
Total		6,897	–	
Source(s) Source: Nova Scotia Legislature (2024). "Electoral History for Guysborough" (PDF). nslegislature.ca.

=== 1906 ===
1906 Nova Scotia general election: Guysborough
Party	Candidate	Votes	%	Elected
Liberal	James F. Ellis	1,705	29.30%	✓
Liberal	William Whitman	1,634	28.08%	✓
Liberal-Conservative	Samuel R. Giffin	1,325	22.77%	
Liberal-Conservative	G. A. R. Rowlings	1,155	19.85%	
Total		5,819	–	
Source(s) Source: Nova Scotia Legislature (2024). "Electoral History for Guysborough" (PDF). nslegislature.ca.

=== 1904 ===
Nova Scotia provincial by-election, 1904-12-08: Guysborough
Party	Candidate	Votes	%	Elected
Liberal	James F. Ellis	acclaimed	N/A	✓
Total			–	
Source(s) Source: Nova Scotia Legislature (2024). "Electoral History for Guysborough" (PDF). nslegislature.ca.

=== 1901 ===
1901 Nova Scotia general election: Guysborough
Party	Candidate	Votes	%	Elected
Liberal	John Howard Sinclair	1,511	36.11%	✓
Liberal	William Whitman	1,498	35.79%	✓
Liberal-Conservative	John Keating	620	14.81%	
Liberal-Conservative	H. T. Harding	556	13.29%	
Total		4,185	–	
Source(s) Source: Nova Scotia Legislature (2024). "Electoral History for Guysborough" (PDF). nslegislature.ca.

=== 1897 ===
1897 Nova Scotia general election: Guysborough
Party	Candidate	Votes	%	Elected
Liberal	William Akins Fergusson	1,525	29.90%	✓
Liberal	John Howard Sinclair	1,523	29.86%	✓
Liberal-Conservative	C. Ernest Gregory	1,065	20.88%	
Liberal-Conservative	Charles S. Elliott	987	19.35%	
Total		5,100	–	
Source(s) Source: Nova Scotia Legislature (2024). "Electoral History for Guysborough" (PDF). nslegislature.ca.

=== 1894 ===
1894 Nova Scotia general election: Guysborough
Party	Candidate	Votes	%	Elected
Liberal	Daniel H. MacKinnon	1,240	28.70%	✓
Liberal	John Howard Sinclair	1,216	28.15%	✓
Liberal-Conservative	Hamilton Morrow	979	22.66%	
Liberal-Conservative	A. Whitman	885	20.49%	
Total		4,320	–	
Source(s) Source: Nova Scotia Legislature (2024). "Electoral History for Guysborough" (PDF). nslegislature.ca.

=== 1890 ===
1890 Nova Scotia general election: Guysborough
Party	Candidate	Votes	%	Elected
Liberal-Conservative	Alexander F. Cameron	831	23.78%	✓
Liberal-Conservative	Hamilton Morrow	755	21.61%	✓
Liberal	James A. Fraser	707	20.23%	
Liberal	A. J. O. Maguire	663	18.98%	
Independent Liberal	Otto Schwartz Weeks	538	15.40%	
Total		3,494	–	
Source(s) Source: Nova Scotia Legislature (2024). "Electoral History for Guysborough" (PDF). nslegislature.ca.

=== 1886 ===
1886 Nova Scotia general election: Guysborough
Party	Candidate	Votes	%	Elected
Liberal	James A. Fraser	1,036	33.67%	✓
Liberal	Otto Schwartz Weeks	931	30.26%	✓
Liberal-Conservative	Joseph William Hadley	565	18.36%	
Liberal-Conservative	J. F. L. Parsons	545	17.71%	
Total		3,077	–	
Source(s) Source: Nova Scotia Legislature (2024). "Electoral History for Guysborough" (PDF). nslegislature.ca.

=== 1882 ===
1882 Nova Scotia general election: Guysborough
Party	Candidate	Votes	%	Elected
Liberal	Otto Schwartz Weeks	871	33.31%	✓
Liberal	James A. Fraser	812	31.05%	✓
Liberal-Conservative	Alexander N. McDonald	518	19.81%	
Liberal-Conservative	Joseph William Hadley	414	15.83%	
Total		2,615	–	
Source(s) Source: Nova Scotia Legislature (2024). "Electoral History for Guysborough" (PDF). nslegislature.ca.

=== 1878 ===
1878 Nova Scotia general election: Guysborough
Party	Candidate	Votes	%	Elected
Liberal-Conservative	Joseph William Hadley	803	25.89%	✓
Liberal-Conservative	Alexander N. McDonald	698	22.51%	✓
Liberal	Duncan Cameron Fraser	596	19.22%	
Liberal	H. R. Cunningham	502	16.19%	
Liberal	Otto Schwartz Weeks	502	16.19%	
Total		3,101	–	
Source(s) Source: Nova Scotia Legislature (2024). "Electoral History for Guysborough" (PDF). nslegislature.ca.

=== 1875 ===
Nova Scotia provincial by-election, 1875-12-20: Guysborough
Party	Candidate	Votes	%	Elected
Liberal	Otto Schwartz Weeks	729	50.41%	✓
Liberal-Conservative	Joseph William Hadley	717	49.59%	
Total		1,446	–	
Source(s) Source: Nova Scotia Legislature (2024). "Electoral History for Guysborough" (PDF). nslegislature.ca.

=== 1874 ===
1874 Nova Scotia general election: Guysborough
Party	Candidate	Votes	%	Elected
Liberal-Conservative	Stewart Campbell	440	18.23%	✓
Liberal-Conservative	Alexander N. McDonald	362	15.00%	✓
Liberal-Conservative	Joseph William Hadley	301	12.47%	
Total		1,103	–	
Source(s) Source: Nova Scotia Legislature (2024). "Electoral History for Guysborough" (PDF). nslegislature.ca.

=== 1874 by-election ===
Nova Scotia provincial by-election, 1874-03-04: Guysborough
Party	Candidate	Votes	%	Elected
Liberal-Conservative	Charles M. Franchville	797	58.18%	✓
Liberal-Conservative	Clement Whitman	573	48.82%	
Total		1,370	–	
Source(s) Source: Nova Scotia Legislature (2024). "Electoral History for Guysborough" (PDF). nslegislature.ca.

=== 1871 ===
1871 Nova Scotia general election: Guysborough
Party	Candidate	Votes	%	Elected
Liberal	John Angus Kirk	745	25.86%	✓
Liberal	William Henry Wylde	743	25.79%	✓
Liberal-Conservative	Joseph William Hadley	706	24.51%	
Liberal-Conservative	Alexander N. McDonald	687	23.85%	
Total		2,881	–	
Source(s) Source: Nova Scotia Legislature (2024). "Electoral History for Guysborough" (PDF). nslegislature.ca.

=== 1870 ===
Nova Scotia provincial by-election, 1870-12-30: Guysborough
Party	Candidate	Votes	%	Elected
Liberal	William Henry Wylde	653	57.74%	✓
Liberal-Conservative	J. A. Tory	441	38.99%	
Independent	Abraham Hart	37	3.27%	
Total		1,131	–	
Source(s) Source: Nova Scotia Legislature (2024). "Electoral History for Guysborough" (PDF). nslegislature.ca.

=== 1867 ===
1867 Nova Scotia general election: Guysborough
Party	Candidate	Votes	%	Elected
Anti-Confederation	John Joseph Marshall	730	32.10%	✓
Anti-Confederation	John Angus Kirk	674	29.64%	✓
Confederation	J. A. Tory	443	19.48%	
Confederation	Alexander N. McDonald	427	18.78%	
Total		2,274	–	
Source(s) Source: Nova Scotia Legislature (2024). "Electoral History for Guysborough" (PDF). nslegislature.ca.

== See also ==
- List of Nova Scotia provincial electoral districts
- Canadian provincial electoral districts
