= 1984 Nova Scotia general election =

Canadian provincial election

- November 6, 1984

52 seats of the Nova Scotia House of Assembly 27 seats needed for a majority
- Turnout: 67.52% ▼6.65pp
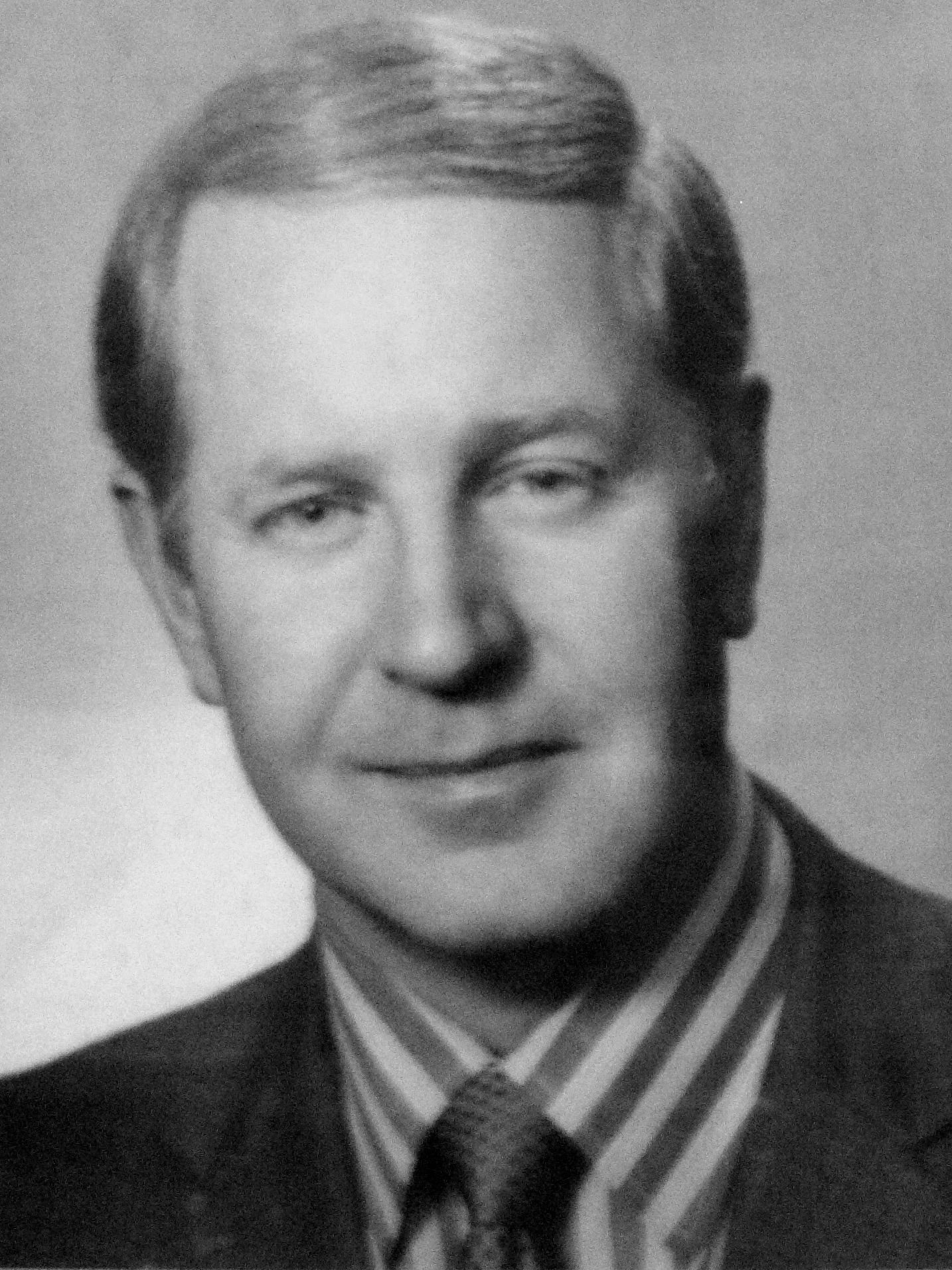

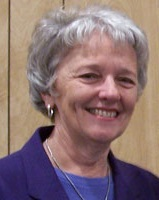

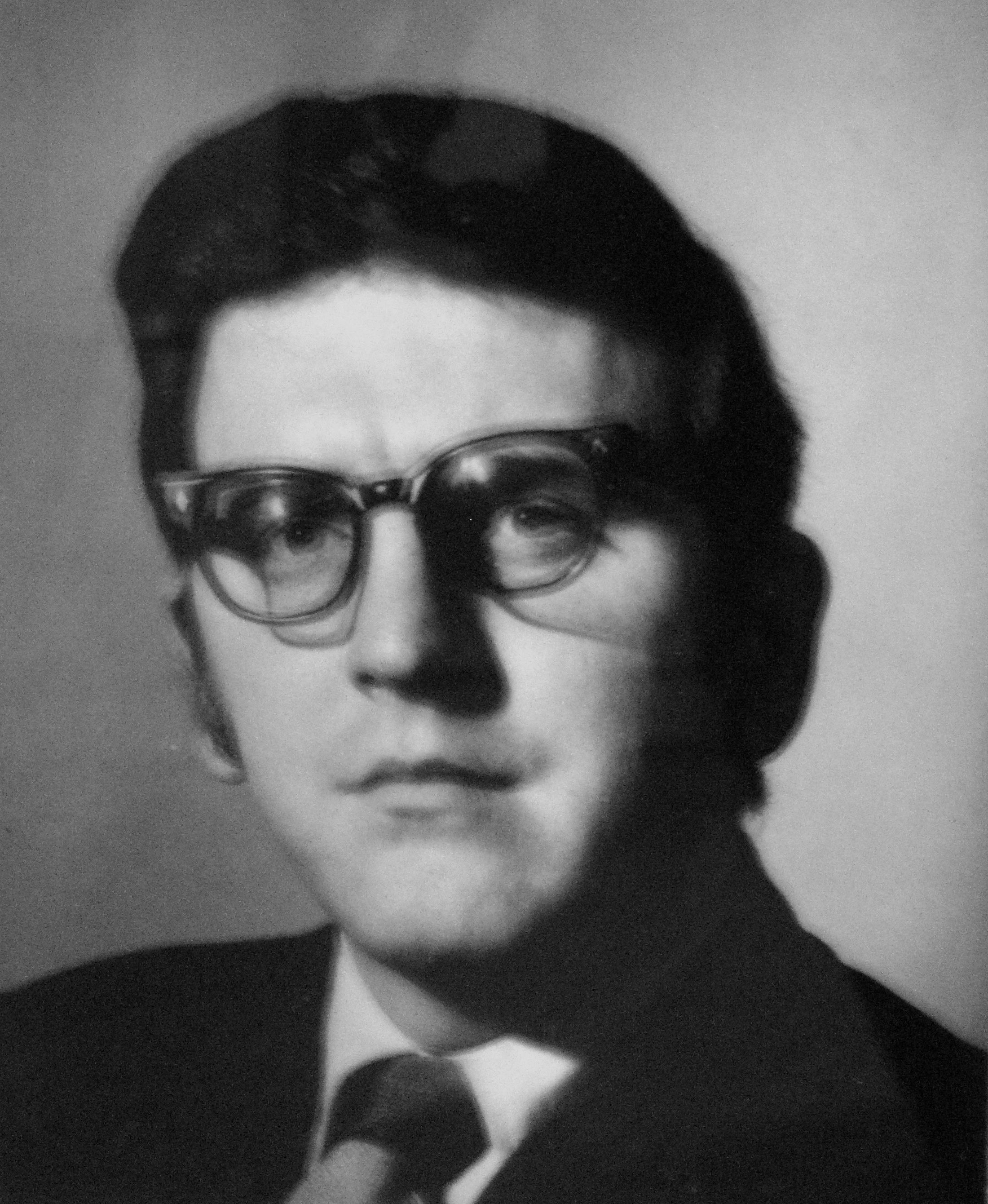
	First party	Second party
		Lib
Leader	John Buchanan	A.M. "Sandy" Cameron
Party	Progressive Conservative	Liberal
Leader since	March 6, 1971	June 8, 1980
Leader's seat	Halifax Atlantic	Guysborough (lost re-election)
Last election	37	13
Seats won	42	6
Seat change	▲5	▼7
Popular vote	209,298	129,310
Percentage	50.41%	31.15%
Swing	▲3.13pp	▼1.81pp
	Third party	Fourth party
Leader	Alexa McDonough	Paul MacEwan
Party	New Democratic	Cape Breton Labour
Leader since	November 16, 1980	1982
Leader's seat	Halifax Chebucto	Cape Breton Nova
Last election	1	New Party
Seats won	3	1
Seat change	▲2	▲1
Popular vote	65,876	8,322
Percentage	15.87%	2.00%
Swing	▼2.14pp	▲2.00pp
Premier before election
John Buchanan
Progressive Conservative
Premier after election
John Buchanan
Progressive Conservative

The 1984 Nova Scotia general election was held on November 6, 1984, to elect members of the 54th House of Assembly of the province of Nova Scotia, Canada. It was won by the Progressive Conservative party.

== Results ==
=== Results by party ===
↓
42	6	3	1
Progressive Conservative	Liberal	New Democratic	Labour

Official results
Party	Party leader	# of candidates	Seats				Popular vote		
Party	Party leader	# of candidates	1981	Dissolution	Elected	Change	#	%	Change (pp)
Progressive Conservative	John Buchanan	52	37	38	42	+5	209,298	50.41%	+3.13%
Liberal	A.M. "Sandy" Cameron	52	13	12	6	-7	129,310	31.15%	-1.81%
New Democratic	Alexa McDonough	52	1	1	3	+2	65,876	15.87%	-2.14%
Cape Breton Labour	Paul MacEwan	14	0	1	1	+1	8,322	2.00%	–
Independent		4	1	0	0	-1	630	0.15%	-1.03%
Vacant				0					
Total valid votes							413,436	99.58%	+0.15%
Blank and invalid ballots							1,724	0.42%	+0.15%
Total		174	52	52	52	–	415,160	100.00%	–
Registered voters / turnout							614,899	67.52%	-6.65%

Popular vote
PC	50.41%
Liberal	31.15%
New Democratic	15.87%
Cape Breton Labour	2.00%
Independent	0.15%

Seats summary
PC	80.77%
Liberal	11.54%
New Democratic	5.77%
Cape Breton Labour	1.92%

== Retiring incumbents ==
Liberal

- Joseph H. Casey, Digby
- Hugh Tinkham, Argyle

Progressive Conservative

- Ron Barkhouse, Lunenburg East
- D. L. George Henley, Cumberland West
- Edward Twohig, Kings North

== Nominated candidates ==
Legend
bold denotes party leader
† denotes an incumbent who is not running for re-election or was defeated in nomination contest

=== Valley ===
Electoral district	Candidates					Incumbent
Electoral district	PC	Liberal	NDP	Cape Breton Labour	Independent	Incumbent
Annapolis East	Gerry Sheehy; 3,736; 56.02%	Nita M. Irvine; 2,011; 30.15%	Joan M. Boutilier; 922; 13.83%			Gerry Sheehy
Annapolis West	Greg Kerr; 2,809; 53.68%	Herb Anderson; 2,019; 38.58%	Howard Langille; 405; 7.74%			Greg Kerr
Clare	Guy LeBlanc; 3,094; 50.33%	Chester Melanson; 2,784; 45.29%	Alain Chabot; 269; 4.38%			Chester Melanson
Digby	Merryl Lawton; 3,451; 60.66%	Paul Scovil; 1,657; 29.13%	Susan Jamieson; 581; 10.21%			Joseph H. Casey†
Hants West	Ron Russell; 4,634; 55.65%	Robert D. Lindsay; 2,535; 30.44%	Alan St. C. Squires; 1,158; 13.91%			Ron Russell
Kings North	George Archibald; 3,655; 49.57%	Bob Wilson; 1,858; 25.20%	Don Fraser; 1,860; 25.23%			Edward Twohig†
Kings South	Paul Kinsman; 3,673; 45.31%	Alan Sponagle; 625; 7.71%	Bob Levy; 3,694; 45.57%		Doug Milligan; 114; 1.41%	Paul Kinsman
Kings West	George Moody; 5,273; 60.45%	Doug McKeil; 2,546; 29.19%	Ted Davis; 904; 10.36%			George Moody

=== South Shore ===
Electoral district	Candidates					Incumbent
Electoral district	PC	Liberal	NDP	Cape Breton Labour	Independent	Incumbent
Argyle	Neil LeBlanc; 2,894; 52.51%	J. Donald Doucette; 2,422; 43.95%	Lawrence Meuse; 195; 3.54%			Hugh Tinkham†
Lunenburg Centre	Maxine Cochran; 5,239; 56.60%	Linton M. Wentzell; 2,669; 28.83%	Angus J. Fields; 1,349; 14.57%			Maxine Cochran
Lunenburg East	David Hatt; 1,764; 32.10%	Jim Barkhouse; 2,696; 49.06%	Janet Mooney; 1,035; 18.84%			Ron Barkhouse†
Lunenburg West	Mel Pickings; 3,435; 51.25%	Caroll W. Young; 2,162; 32.25%	Martha Laurence; 1,106; 16.50%			Mel Pickings
Queens	John Leefe; 3,661; 59.92%	Hugh Mosher; 1,532; 25.07%	Bill Zimmerman; 917; 15.01%			John Leefe
Shelburne	Ron Leary; 3,659; 43.88%	Harold Huskilson; 3,843; 46.09%	Laurie Hitchens; 601; 7.21%		Etheren Goreham; 235; 2.82%	Harold Huskilson
Yarmouth	Alex McIntosh; 4,400; 49.16%	Fraser Mooney; 3,755; 41.96%	Brian Doucette; 795; 8.88%			Fraser Mooney

=== Fundy-Northeast ===
Electoral district	Candidates					Incumbent
Electoral district	PC	Liberal	NDP	Cape Breton Labour	Independent	Incumbent
Colchester North	Jack Coupar; 3,796; 46.65%	Ed Lorraine; 3,636; 44.68%	Alan M. Marchbank; 706; 8.68%			Ed Lorraine
Colchester South	R. Colin Stewart; 3,572; 63.85%	Fred A. Kennedy; 1,530; 27.35%	Bernard A. Gay; 492; 8.80%			R. Colin Stewart
Cumberland Centre	Douglas Marshall; 1,804; 41.03%	Guy Brown; 2,436; 55.40%	Stanley H. McCormick; 157; 3.57%			Guy Brown
Cumberland East	Roger Stuart Bacon; 4,837; 61.35%	Ira Drysdale; 2,349; 29.79%	Barbara Anne Marsden; 698; 8.85%			Roger Stuart Bacon
Cumberland West	Gardner Hurley; 2,503; 51.77%	Gary Gordon; 1,845; 38.16%	Sandy Graham; 487; 10.07%			D. L. George Henley†
Hants East	Cora Etter; 3,730; 48.57%	Jack Hawkins; 3,192; 41.57%	Herbert H. Radley; 757; 9.86%			Jack Hawkins
Truro—Bible Hill	Ron Giffin; 5,008; 61.03%	Kirby Eileen Grant; 2,253; 27.46%	Andy Belliveau; 945; 11.52%			Ron Giffin

=== Central Halifax ===
Electoral district	Candidates					Incumbent
Electoral district	PC	Liberal	NDP	Cape Breton Labour	Independent	Incumbent
Halifax Bedford Basin	Joel Matheson; 5,613; 47.32%	Alan Weeks; 2,224; 18.75%	Paul Fiander; 4,024; 33.93%			Joel Matheson
Halifax Chebucto	Helen Gillis; 2,630; 29.85%	Dan Clarke; 1,806; 20.50%	**Alexa McDonough**; 4,374; 49.65%			Alexa McDonough
Halifax Citadel	Art Donahoe; 3,652; 40.40%	John Godfrey; 2,524; 27.92%	Eileen O'Connell; 2,864; 31.68%			Art Donahoe
Halifax Cornwallis	Terry Donahoe; 5,273; 47.80%	Dale Godsoe; 2,753; 24.96%	Tim Hill; 3,005; 27.24%			Terry Donahoe
Halifax Needham	Edmund L. Morris; 3,173; 39.97%	Walter Fitzgerald; 2,208; 27.81%	Maureen MacDonald; 2,514; 31.67%	Beatrice Kaizer; 44; 0.55%		Edmund L. Morris

=== Suburban Halifax ===
Electoral district	Candidates					Incumbent
Electoral district	PC	Liberal	NDP	Cape Breton Labour	Independent	Incumbent
Bedford-Musquodoboit Valley	Ken Streatch; 4,953; 59.98%	John M. Dillon; 1,755; 21.25%	Susan Coldwell; 1,468; 17.78%	Alfred Nieforth; 82; 0.99%		Ken Streatch
Halifax Atlantic	**John Buchanan**; 5,528; 58.37%	David C. Melnick; 1,888; 19.93%	Rene Quigley; 1,942; 20.50%		Arthur R. Canning; 113; 1.19%	John Buchanan
Halifax-St. Margaret's	Jerry Lawrence; 5,141; 57.39%	Michael N. Kelly; 1,559; 17.40%	Lillian Viau; 2,258; 25.21%			Jerry Lawrence
Sackville	Malcolm A. MacKay; 2,997; 26.49%	Bill MacDonald; 3,763; 33.26%	John Holm; 4,555; 40.26%			Malcolm A. MacKay

=== Dartmouth/Cole Harbour/Eastern Shore ===
Electoral district	Candidates					Incumbent
Electoral district	PC	Liberal	NDP	Cape Breton Labour	Independent	Incumbent
Cole Harbour	David Nantes; 5,283; 61.49%	Dennis F. Cuvelier; 1,614; 18.78%	Les MacDougall; 1,695; 19.73%			David Nantes
Dartmouth East	Richard L. Weldon; 3,101; 33.84%	Jim Smith; 4,004; 43.70%	Gerry Legere; 2,058; 22.46%			Richard L. Weldon
Dartmouth North	Laird Stirling; 3,200; 43.45%	Pat Connolly; 2,150; 29.20%	Chester Sanford; 1,938; 26.32%	Ron Bugbee; 76; 1.03%		Laird Stirling
Dartmouth South	Roland J. Thornhill; 4,534; 58.20%	Don Walker; 1,666; 21.39%	Fred Lutley; 1,590; 20.41%			Roland J. Thornhill
Halifax Eastern Shore	Tom McInnis; 5,395; 62.74%	Paul MacKenzie; 2,151; 25.01%	Kevin Wilson; 1,053; 12.25%			Tom McInnis

=== Central Nova ===
Electoral district	Candidates					Incumbent
Electoral district	PC	Liberal	NDP	Cape Breton Labour	Independent	Incumbent
Antigonish	Liz Chisholm; 4,854; 44.89%	Bill Gillis; 5,167; 47.78%	Bill Woodfine; 793; 7.33%			Bill Gillis
Guysborough	Chuck MacNeil; 3,859; 50.70%	**A.M. "Sandy" Cameron**; 3,469; 45.57%	Elsie Richard; 284; 3.73%			A.M. "Sandy" Cameron
Pictou Centre	Jack MacIsaac; 6,596; 67.11%	Bob Leahy; 2,103; 21.40%	Kim Murray; 1,130; 11.50%			Jack MacIsaac
Pictou East	Donald Cameron; 4,367; 63.75%	Scott Johnston; 1,754; 25.61%	Larry Duchesne; 729; 10.64%			Donald Cameron
Pictou West	Donald P. McInnes; 3,844; 59.78%	Bob Naylor; 1,932; 30.05%	Lynn Curwin-Porteous; 486; 7.56%		Franklin R. Fiske; 168; 2.61%	Donald P. McInnes

=== Cape Breton ===
Electoral district	Candidates					Incumbent
Electoral district	PC	Liberal	NDP	Cape Breton Labour	Independent	Incumbent
Cape Breton Centre	Mike Laffin; 4,586; 58.83%	A. Beaver Parsons; 1,264; 16.22%	Angus Grant; 743; 9.53%	Dan MacKinnon; 1,202; 15.42%		Mike Laffin
Cape Breton East	Donnie MacLeod; 9,822; 96.33%	Cha Keliher; 3,579; 33.62%	Jim Jobe; 555; 5.21%	Blair Matheson; 1,724; 16.20%		Donnie MacLeod
Cape Breton North	Brian Young; 6,431; 70.01%	Hank Lamond; 1,637; 17.82%	Tom Rose; 709; 7.72%	M.J. Julian; 409; 4.45%		Brian Young
Cape Breton Nova	Jim Neville; 1,747; 23.87%	John Ryan; 1,066; 14.56%	Alex MacIsaac; 674; 9.21%	Paul MacEwan; 3,832; 52.36%		Paul MacEwan
Cape Breton South	Murdock Smith; 5,049; 42.04%	Vince MacLean; 5,961; 49.63%	John Chisholm; 633; 5.27%	Kim MacEwan; 367; 3.06%		Vince MacLean
Cape Breton—The Lakes	John Newell; 4,535; 51.29%	John Coady; 3,338; 37.75%	Richard Fogarty; 813; 9.19%	Mary Strickland; 156; 1.76%		John Newell
Cape Breton West	"Big" Donnie MacLeod; 9,822; 96.33%	Russell MacKinnon; 3,925; 40.04%	Terry Crawley; 582; 5.94%	Linda Martin; 261; 2.66%		"Big" Donnie MacLeod
Inverness North	Norman J. MacLean; 3,475; 45.57%	John Archie MacKenzie; 3,209; 42.08%	Ben Boucher; 913; 11.97%	Nancy Thomas; 29; 0.38%		John Archie MacKenzie
Inverness South	Billy Joe MacLean; 3,349; 63.44%	Danny Graham; 1,736; 32.83%	Al MacKinnon; 246; 4.65%	Laddie Golemiec; 33; 0.62%		Billy Joe MacLean
Richmond	Greg MacIsaac; 3,262; 47.20%	Richie Mann; 2,790; 40.37%	Shirley McNamara; 828; 11.98%	Ken Covey; 31; 0.45%		Greg MacIsaac
Victoria	Fisher Hudson; 2,498; 50.76%	Elmourne K. MacKinnon; 1,960; 39.83%	Fraser Patterson; 387; 7.86%	Bernice MacLean; 76; 1.54%		Fisher Hudson
