= Clarence W. Anderson =

Canadian politician

MLA for Guysborough County
- In office 1928–1937
- Preceded by: Simon Osborn Giffin; Howard Amos Rice
- Succeeded by: Havelock Torrey
- In office 1920–1925
- Preceded by: James F. Ellis
- Succeeded by: Simon Osborn Giffin; Howard Amos Rice

Personal details
- Born: February 17, 1871 Sherbrooke, Nova Scotia
- Died: December 16, 1944 (aged 73) Halifax, Nova Scotia
- Party: Nova Scotia Liberal Party
- Occupation: merchant

Clarence Wentworth Anderson (February 17, 1871 – December 16, 1944) was a Canadian politician. He represented the electoral district of Guysborough County in the Nova Scotia House of Assembly from 1920 to 1925, and 1928 to 1937. He was a member of the Nova Scotia Liberal Party.

Born in 1871 at Sherbrooke, Nova Scotia, Anderson was a merchant by career. He married Annie Baker in 1894, and then Katherine Clifford MacLennan. He was a municipal councillor, serving from 1908 to 1920 as warden for the Municipality of the District of St. Mary's.

Anderson entered provincial politics in 1920, when he was elected in the dual-member Guysborough County riding with Liberal James Cranswick Tory. Both Anderson and Tory were defeated when they ran for re-election in 1925, but Anderson regained the seat in the 1928 election, serving with Liberal Michael E. Morrison. In the 1933 election, Anderson was re-elected in the now single-member Guysborough riding. In September 1933, Anderson was appointed to the Executive Council of Nova Scotia, serving until he resigned from cabinet in April 1937. He did not reoffer in the 1937 election. Anderson died at Halifax on December 16, 1944.
