= Alexander W. Cameron =

Canadian politician

A. W. Cameron

MLA for Guysborough
- In office October 30, 1956 – May 12, 1960
- Preceded by: Arthur W. MacKenzie
- Succeeded by: Alexander MacIsaac

Personal details
- Born: December 6, 1905 Sherbrooke, Nova Scotia
- Died: May 12, 1960 (aged 54) Antigonish, Nova Scotia
- Party: Liberal
- Occupation: lawyer

Alexander Whitcomb Cameron (December 6, 1905 – May 12, 1960) was a Canadian politician. He represented the electoral district of Guysborough in the Nova Scotia House of Assembly from 1956 to 1960. He was a member of the Nova Scotia Liberal Party.

Born in 1905 at Sherbrooke, Nova Scotia, Cameron was a lawyer by career. He graduated from Mount Allison University and Dalhousie University. He married Mary Kathryn MacLean in 1936. His father, Alexander, and his son, Sandy, also served as MLAs for Guysborough. From 1940 to 1957, he was employed as a municipal treasurer and clerk. He entered provincial politics in the 1956 election, winning the Guysborough riding by 166 votes. Cameron died at Antigonish on May 12, 1960.
