= William Whitman =

William Whitman may refer to:

- William Whitman (politician) (ca. 1848–1924), Canadian politician from Nova Scotia
- William Francis Whitman Jr. (1914–2007), horticulturist
- William Merrill Whitman (1911–1993), lawyer for the Panama Canal Zone
