= Daniel MacKinnon =

Daniel MacKinnon, Mackinnon, or McKinnon may refer to:

- Daniel Mackinnon (1791–1836), Scottish soldier
- Dan Mackinnon (1903–1983), Australian politician
- Daniel McKinnon (ice hockey) (1927–2017), American ice hockey player
- Daniel MacKinnon (boxer) (born 1983), New Zealand boxer
- Daniel H. MacKinnon (1866–?), lawyer and political figure in Nova Scotia, Canada
- Dan A. McKinnon III (1939–2003), justice of the New Mexico Supreme Court
