= Sandy Cameron =

Canadian politician and businessman (1938–2004)

MLA for Guysborough
- In office June 5, 1973 – November 6, 1984
- Preceded by: Angus MacIsaac
- Succeeded by: Chuck MacNeil

Personal details
- Born: Alexander MacLean Cameron; December 16, 1938 Sherbrooke, Nova Scotia, Canada
- Died: December 25, 2004 (aged 66) Sherbrooke, Nova Scotia, Canada
- Party: Liberal
- Occupation: Businessman

Alexander MacLean "Sandy" Cameron (December 16, 1938 – December 25, 2004) was a Canadian politician and businessman. He represented the electoral district of Guysborough in the Nova Scotia House of Assembly from 1973 to 1984. He was a member of the Nova Scotia Liberal Party.

== Early life and career ==
Born in 1938 at Sherbrooke, Nova Scotia, Cameron was the son of Alexander Whitcomb Cameron and Mary Kathryn (MacLean) Cameron. A businessman by career, Cameron was educated at the Nova Scotia Agricultural College and McGill University. He married Shirley Elaine Vatcher in 1961. Both his father, Alexander W. Cameron, and his grandfather, Alexander F. Cameron served as MLAs for Guysborough County. His son, Alex Cameron (born 1964), became an Anglican Church of Canada priest and was in 2022 elected bishop of the Anglican Diocese of Pittsburgh.

== Political career ==
Cameron entered provincial politics in 1973, winning a byelection in the Guysborough riding. In August 1973, Cameron was appointed to the Executive Council of Nova Scotia as Minister of Fisheries. He was re-elected in the 1974 election, and continued to serve in the fisheries portfolio. In February 1976, he was given an additional role in cabinet as Minister of Lands and Forests. In October 1976, Gerald Regan shuffled his cabinet, moving Cameron to Minister of Development. Cameron was re-elected by 13 votes in the 1978 election, but moved to the opposition benches as Regan's Liberal government was defeated.

=== As leader of the Liberal Party ===
On April 3, 1980, Cameron announced his candidacy for the leadership of the Nova Scotia Liberal Party. At the leadership convention on June 8, Cameron defeated MLA Vince MacLean on the third ballot to win the leadership. In the 1981 election, the Liberals were reduced to 13 seats as John Buchanan's Tories were re-elected with a bigger majority. However, Cameron was re-elected in his own riding by over 600 votes, and continued to serve as party leader. He led the Liberals into the 1984 election, but the party was reduced to 6 seats, while their popular vote dropped to 31 per cent. Cameron was also defeated in his own riding, losing to Progressive Conservative Chuck MacNeil by 390 votes. Cameron announced in December that he would resign as Opposition leader when an interim leader in the legislature was chosen. He was succeeded by Vince MacLean.

== Death ==
Cameron died on December 25, 2004, aged 66, in his hometown of Sherbrooke after a brief battle with cancer.
