= Michael Edward Morrison =

Canadian politician from Nova Scotia (1885–unknown)

Member of the Nova Scotia House of Assembly for Guysborough County
- In office October 1, 1928 – August 21, 1933

Personal details
- Born: February 10, 1885 River Bourgeois, Nova Scotia
- Party: Liberal
- Spouse: Evangeline Martell
- Education: St. Francis Xavier University; Dalhousie University (DDS)
- Occupation: dentist, politician

Michael Edward Morrison (February 10, 1885 – unknown) was a dentist and political figure in Nova Scotia, Canada. He represented Guysborough County in the Nova Scotia House of Assembly from 1928 to 1933 as a Liberal member.

Morrison was born in 1885 at River Bourgeois, Nova Scotia to Archibald Morrison and Margaret McNamara. He was educated at St. Francis Xavier University and Dalhousie University, receiving a Doctor of Dental Surgery degree in 1923. He married Evangeline Martell on June 28, 1927. He served overseas with the Canadian Expeditionary Force during the First World War from 1916 to 1919. He later served as a town councillor in Canso, Nova Scotia from February 10, 1926, to October 10, 1928.

He was elected in the 1928 Nova Scotia general election, and did not contest the 1933 Nova Scotia general election.
