= William Merrill =

William Merrill may refer to:

- William Emery Merrill (1837–1891), American soldier and military engineer
- William Henry Merrill (1868–1923), American electrical engineer and founder of Underwriters Laboratories
- William P. Merrill (1867–1954), American theologian and hymn-writer
- William Stetson Merrill (1886–1969), American librarian

== See also ==
- William Merrill Whitman (1911–1993), American lawyer and officer of the Panama Canal Company
