= Desire J. Comeau =

Canadian politician

MLA for Clare
- In office 1949–1953
- Preceded by: new riding
- Succeeded by: Pierre E. Belliveau

Personal details
- Born: July 23, 1906 Meteghan, Nova Scotia
- Died: October 6, 1972 (aged 66) Arvida, Quebec
- Party: Progressive Conservative
- Occupation: manufacturer

Desire Joseph Comeau (July 23, 1906 – October 6, 1972) was a Canadian politician. He represented the electoral district of Clare in the Nova Scotia House of Assembly from 1949 to 1953. He was a member of the Progressive Conservative Party of Nova Scotia.

Comeau was born at Meteghan, Digby County, Nova Scotia in 1906. A manufacturer by career, he married Antoinette Marie Saulnier in 1928. Comeau entered provincial politics in the 1949 election, defeating Liberal Benoit Comeau by 38 votes in the newly established Clare riding. He was defeated by Liberal Pierre E. Belliveau when he ran for re-election in 1953. Comeau died at Arvida, Quebec on October 6, 1972.
