= 54th Nova Scotia general election =

The 54th Nova Scotia general election may refer to

- the 1984 Nova Scotia general election, the 53rd overall general election for Nova Scotia, for the (due to a counting error in 1859) 54th General Assembly of Nova Scotia, or
- the 1988 Nova Scotia general election, the 54th overall general election for Nova Scotia, for the 55th General Assembly of Nova Scotia, but considered the 32nd general election for the Canadian province of Nova Scotia.
