= 1993 Nova Scotia general election =

Canadian provincial election

- May 25, 1993

52 seats of the Nova Scotia House of Assembly 27 seats needed for a majority
- Turnout: 75.39% ▼0.37 pp
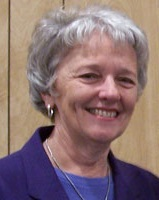
	First party	Second party	Third party
	Lib	PC
Leader	John Savage	Donald W. Cameron	Alexa McDonough
Party	Liberal	Progressive Conservative	New Democratic
Leader since	June 20, 1992	February 9, 1991	November 16, 1980
Leader's seat	Ran in Dartmouth South (won)	Pictou East	Halifax Fairview
Last election	21	28	2
Seats won	40	9	3
Seat change	▲19	▼19	▲1
Popular vote	237,493	150,862	85,946
Percentage	48.96%	31.09%	17.72%
Swing	▲9.59pp	▼12.12pp	▲2.05pp
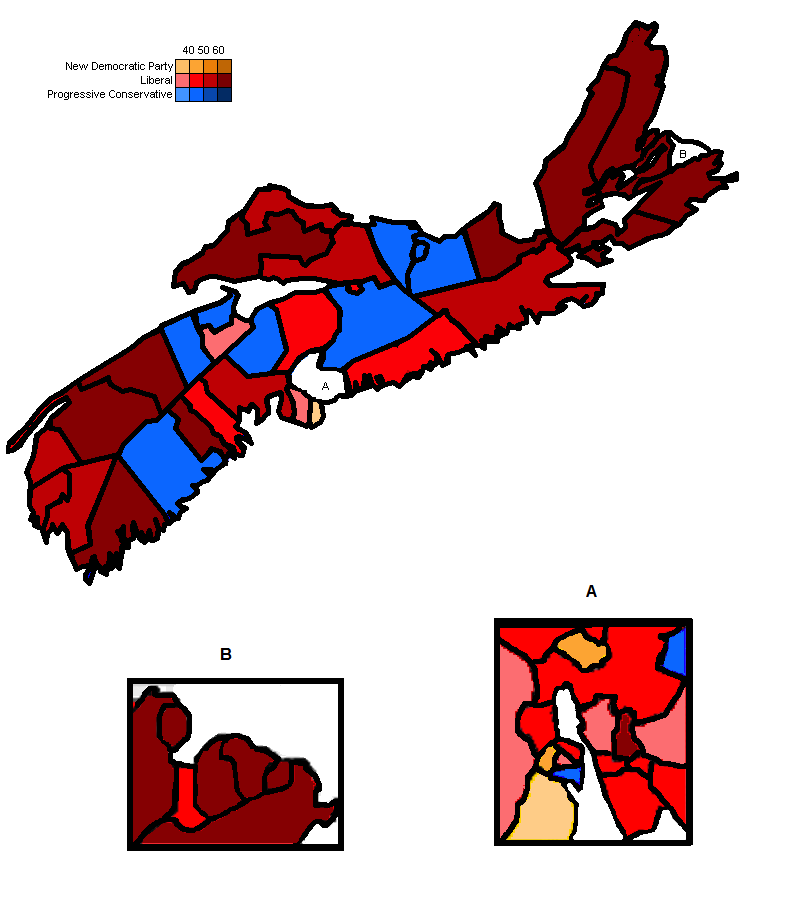
- Riding map of Nova Scotia showing winning parties
Premier before election
Donald W. Cameron
Progressive Conservative
Premier after election
John Savage
Liberal

The 1993 Nova Scotia general election was held on May 25, 1993, to elect members of the 56th House of Assembly of the province of Nova Scotia, Canada. The Liberals under John Savage won a landslide victory over the unpopular Progressive Conservatives under Premier Donald Cameron, while Alexa McDonough's NDP remained a distant third, winning three seats.

== Campaign ==
The Progressive Conservatives, led by Donald Cameron, campaigned on his record of making 152 reforms since assuming office in 1991. Cameron slashed government spending, cutting out free coffee and rented plants in government offices. John Buchanan (served 1978 to 1990) suffered allegations of patronage which Cameron could not overcome during the election campaign. Cameron vowed to end patronage and balance the budget within three years or he would resign. However, Cameron made a controversial move by appointing two unelected women to his cabinet immediately prior to the election campaign.

Liberal leader John Savage promised to end pork-barrel politics and introduce a new style of governing focusing on job creation.

== Opinion polls ==
Evolution of voting intentions at provincial level
Polling firm	Last day of survey	Source	LANS	PCNS	NSNDP	Other	ME	Sample
Election 1993	May 25, 1993		48.96	31.09	17.72	1.53		
Omnifacts	January 1992		54	28	16	2	3.9	645
Omnifacts	December 1992		50	27	23	—N/a	—N/a	550
Corporate Research Associates	December 1992		42	31	23	—N/a	—N/a	—N/a
Omnifacts	January 1992		32	33	35	—N/a	4.0	550
Election 1988	September 6, 1988		39.37	43.21	15.67	1.19		

== Results ==
=== Results by party ===
↓
40	9	3
Liberal	Progressive Conservative	New Democratic

Official results
Party	Party leader	# of candidates	Seats				Popular vote		
Party	Party leader	# of candidates	1988	Dissolution	Elected	Change	#	%	Change (pp)
Liberal	John Savage	52	21	21	40	+19	237,493	48.96%	+9.59%
Progressive Conservative	Donald Cameron	52	28	24	9	−19	150,862	31.09%	-12.12%
New Democratic	Alexa McDonough	52	2	3	3	+1	85,946	17.72%	+2.05%
Natural Law		12	0	0	0	0	1,647	0.34%	–
Independent		12	1	2	0	-1	5,758	1.19%	0.00%
Vacant				2					
Total valid votes							481,706	99.30%	-0.15%
Blank and invalid ballots							3,410	0.70%	+0.15%
Total		180	52	52	52	–	485,116	100.00%	–
Registered voters / turnout							654,280	75.39%	-0.37%

Popular vote
Liberal	48.96%
PC	31.09%
New Democratic	17.72%
Independent	1.19%
Natural Law	0.34%

Seats summary
Liberal	76.92%
PC	17.31%
New Democratic	5.77%

=== Results by region ===
Party name		HRM	C.B.	Valley	S. Shore	Fundy	Central	Total
Parties winning seats in the legislature:
Liberal	Seats:	13	10	4	6	5	2	40
Liberal	Popular vote:	40.99%	65.94%	46.70%	52.22%	50.20%	48.93%	49.67%
Progressive Conservative	Seats:	1	-	3	1	1	3	9
Progressive Conservative	Popular vote:	29.83%	19.74%	36.43%	29.00%	37.21%	39.90%	31.11%
New Democratic Party	Seats:	3	-	-	-	-	-	3
New Democratic Party	Popular vote:	27.77%	13.72%	12.81%	11.91%	13.40%	10.47%	17.55%
Parties not winning seats in the legislature:
Natural Law	Popular vote:	0.52%	N/A	0.43%	N/A	N/A	N/A	0.34%
Independents	Popular vote:	0.89%	0.60%	3.62%	2.24%	0.27%	0.69%	1.18%
Total seats:		17	10	7	7	6	5	52

== Retiring incumbents ==
Liberal

- Jack Hawkins, Hants East
- Harold Huskilson, Shelburne
- Vince MacLean, Cape Breton South

Progressive Conservative

- Roger Stuart Bacon, Cumberland East
- Art Donahoe, Halifax Citadel
- Ron Giffin, Truro-Bible Hill
- Jerry Lawrence, Halifax-St. Margaret's
- Jack MacIsaac, Pictou Centre
- David Nantes, Cole Harbour
- R. Colin Stewart, Colchester South
- Roland J. Thornhill, Dartmouth South

== Nominated candidates ==
Legend
bold denotes party leader
† denotes an incumbent who is not running for re-election or was defeated in nomination contest

=== Valley ===
Electoral district	Candidates					Incumbent
Electoral district	PC	Liberal	NDP	Natural Law	Independent	Incumbent
Annapolis	Greg Kerr; 3,388; 30.34%	Earl Rayfuse; 7,022; 62.89%	Margaret Wolfe; 756; 6.77%			New riding
Clare	Guy LeBlanc; 2,854; 42.87%	Wayne Gaudet; 3,461; 51.99%	Christian Collin; 342; 5.14%			Guy LeBlanc
Digby—Annapolis	Walter MacAlpine; 1,521; 18.72%	Joseph H. Casey; 5,805; 71.46%	Susan Jamieson; 797; 9.81%			Joseph H. Casey; Digby
Hants West	Ron Russell; 4,152; 40.41%	Mike Doyle; 4,106; 39.96%	Dana Harvey; 1,881; 18.31%		Donald L. McKay; 136; 1.32%	Ron Russell
Kings North	George Archibald; 4,137; 42.62%	Jennifer Foster; 3,980; 41.01%	Cameron Jess; 1,505; 15.51%	Anne Dow; 84; 0.87%		George Archibald
Kings South	Harry How; 2,941; 28.24%	Robbie Harrison; 3,069; 29.46%	Steve Mattson; 2,064; 19.82%	Peter Cameron; 102; 0.98%	Derrick Kimball; 2,240; 21.51%	Derrick Kimball
Kings West	George Moody; 4,895; 53.08%	Baden Thurber; 3,178; 34.46%	Jacquie DeMestral; 1,055; 11.44%	Christopher MacLean; 94; 1.02%		George Moody

=== South Shore ===
Electoral district	Candidates					Incumbent
Electoral district	PC	Liberal	NDP	Natural Law	Independent	Incumbent
Argyle	Neil LeBlanc; 2,633; 44.28%	Allister Surette; 3,091; 51.98%	Dee Dee Daigle; 222; 3.73%			Neil LeBlanc
Chester—St. Margaret's	Aileen Heisler; 2,867; 29.49%	Jim Barkhouse; 5,025; 51.69%	Jack Ross; 1,644; 16.91%		Malcolm Callaway; 185; 1.90%	Jim Barkhouse; Lunenburg East
Lunenburg	Al Mosher; 3,709; 38.26%	Lila O'Connor; 3,982; 41.07%	Wade Vernon Garrison; 1,487; 15.34%	Walton Cook; 517; 5.33%		Al Mosher; Lunenburg Centre
Lunenburg West	Marie Dechman; 2,910; 28.09%	Don Downe; 6,276; 60.59%	Karen Reinhardt; 1,172; 11.31%			Marie Dechman
Queens	John Leefe; 3,529; 47.11%	Marilyn Large; 3,266; 43.60%	Anne Corbin; 696; 9.29%			John Leefe
Shelburne	Mary E. Rose; 2,002; 22.71%	Clifford Huskilson; 5,438; 61.70%	Kathleen K. Tudor; 692; 7.85%		Kent A. Blades; 507; 5.75% James M. Harding; 175; 1.99%	Harold Huskilson †
Yarmouth	Leroy Legere; 3,138; 32.08%	Richie Hubbard; 5,197; 53.13%	Ian MacPherson; 1,447; 14.79%			Leroy Legere

=== Fundy-Northeast ===
Electoral district	Candidates					Incumbent
Electoral district	PC	Liberal	NDP	Natural Law	Independent	Incumbent
Colchester—Musquodoboit Valley	Ken Streatch; 4,221; 45.74%	John David Tilley; 3,463; 37.52%	Roger J. Hunka; 1,545; 16.74%			R. Colin Stewart†; Colchester South
Colchester North	Tom Taggart; 3,306; 35.02%	Ed Lorraine; 5,123; 54.27%	Patsy Forrest; 1,010; 10.70%			Ed Lorraine
Cumberland North	Ernie Fage; 4,354; 40.63%	Ross Bragg; 5,605; 52.31%	Curtis Leland Bird; 756; 7.06%			Ross Bragg; Cumberland West
Cumberland South	Mac Bennett; 1,570; 17.69%	Guy Brown; 6,713; 75.63%	Douglas Meekins; 431; 4.86%		Philip T. Donkin; 162; 1.83%	Guy Brown; Cumberland Centre
Hants East	Stephen MacKeil; 3,657; 37.43%	Bob Carruthers; 4,295; 43.97%	Terry MacLean; 1,817; 18.60%			Jack Hawkins †
Truro—Bible Hill	Jack Coupar; 4,134; 38.36%	Eleanor Norrie; 4,321; 40.10%	Rick Bowden; 2,321; 21.54%			Ron Giffin †

=== Central Halifax ===
Electoral district	Candidates					Incumbent
Electoral district	PC	Liberal	NDP	Natural Law	Independent	Incumbent
Halifax Bedford Basin	Joel Matheson; 4,270; 37.63%	Gerry Fogarty; 4,676; 41.21%	Clarrie MacKinnon; 2,323; 20.47%	Pulkesh Lakhanpal; 77; 0.68%		Joel Matheson
Halifax Chebucto	J. Clair Callaghan; 2,903; 27.07%	Jay Abbass; 3,906; 36.42%	Eileen O'Connell; 3,800; 35.43%	Christopher Collrin; 116; 1.08%		Alexa McDonough
Halifax Citadel	Terry Donahoe; 4,584; 39.23%	Liz Crocker; 4,505; 38.55%	Mary Sparling; 2,433; 20.82%	Gilles Bigras; 78; 0.67%	Jan Morrison; 85; 0.73%	Art Donahoe †
Halifax Fairview	Rosanna Liberatore; 2,078; 19.75%	Art Flynn; 3,558; 33.82%	**Alexa McDonough**; 4,789; 45.52%	Mark Hawkins; 96; 0.91%		New riding
Halifax Needham	Ron Walter Milsom; 1,852; 18.48%	Gerry O'Malley; 4,527; 45.18%	Innis MacDonald; 3,555; 35.48%	Ian Temple; 85; 0.85%		Gerry O'Malley

=== Suburban Halifax ===
Electoral district	Candidates					Incumbent
Electoral district	PC	Liberal	NDP	Natural Law	Independent	Incumbent
Bedford—Fall River	Peter J. Kelly; 4,401; 40.57%	Francene Cosman; 4,794; 44.19%	Ryan Kidney; 1,653; 15.24%			Ken Streatch; Bedford-Musquodoboit Valley
Halifax Atlantic	Kevin Umlah; 2,731; 25.16%	Randy Ball; 4,053; 37.34%	Robert Chisholm; 4,071; 37.50%			Robert Chisholm
Sackville—Beaver Bank	Stephen Taylor; 2,353; 26.93%	Bill MacDonald; 3,620; 41.43%	Frank Sutherland; 2,764; 31.64%			New riding
Sackville—Cobequid	George Mansfield; 2,313; 22.00%	Don Boutilier; 3,159; 30.04%	John Holm; 5,044; 47.97%			John Holm; Sackville
Timberlea—Prospect	Debi Forsyth-Smith; 2,744; 30.54%	Bruce Holland; 3,470; 38.62%	Bill Estabrooks; 2,772; 30.85%			Jerry Lawrence †; Halifax-St. Margaret's

=== Dartmouth/Cole Harbour/Eastern Shore ===
Electoral district	Candidates					Incumbent
Electoral district	PC	Liberal	NDP	Natural Law	Independent	Incumbent
Cole Harbour—Eastern Passage	John Gold; 3,409; 34.89%	Dennis Richards; 4,702; 48.13%	Ash Shaikh; 1,501; 15.36%	Helen Creighton; 158; 1.62%		New riding
Dartmouth—Cole Harbour	Michael L. MacDonald; 2,905; 31.31%	Alan Mitchell; 4,079; 43.97%	Gail Cann; 2,293; 24.72%			David Nantes †; Cole Harbour
Dartmouth East	Gwen Haliburton; 2,429; 27.46%	Jim Smith; 4,912; 55.53%	Owen Hertzman; 1,504; 17.00%			Jim Smith
Dartmouth North	Mike Brownlow; 2,327; 27.11%	Sandy Jolly; 3,301; 38.46%	Jerry Pye; 2,878; 33.53%	Monique Poudrette; 77; 0.90%		Sandy Jolly
Dartmouth South	Colin May; 3,091; 31.47%	**John Savage**; 4,346; 44.25%	Don Chard; 2,221; 22.61%	Alexander J. Gillis; 163; 1.66%		Roland J. Thornhill †
Eastern Shore	Tom McInnis; 3,523; 40.72%	Keith Colwell; 3,760; 43.46%	Gary Moore; 1,369; 15.82%			Tom McInnis; Halifax Eastern Shore
Preston	Darryl Gray; 1,016; 20.94%	Wayne Adams; 1,872; 38.57%	Yvonne Atwell; 584; 12.03%		David Hendsbee; 1,381; 28.46%	New riding

=== Central Nova ===
Electoral district	Candidates					Incumbent
Electoral district	PC	Liberal	NDP	Natural Law	Independent	Incumbent
Antigonish	Liz Chisholm; 3,196; 28.26%	Bill Gillis; 7,292; 64.48%	Marion MacDonald; 821; 7.26%			Bill Gillis
Guysborough—Port Hawkesbury	Chuck MacNeil; 4,242; 43.20%	Ray White; 5,487; 56.55%	Frank X. Fraser; 982; 10.12%			Chuck MacNeil; Guysborough
Pictou Centre	John Hamm; 4,840; 47.40%	Mary Daley; 4,364; 42.73%	Cecil MacNeil; 1,008; 9.87%			Jack MacIsaac †
Pictou East	**Donald Cameron**; 4,446; 47.05%	Wayne Fraser; 3,729; 39.46%	Dave Peters; 1,275; 13.49%			Donald Cameron
Pictou West	Donald P. McInnes; 4,032; 45.72%	Rob McDowell; 3,347; 37.95%	Sonny Campbell; 1,097; 12.44%		Edward MacMaster; 343; 3.89%	Donald P. McInnes

=== Cape Breton ===
Electoral district	Candidates					Incumbent
Electoral district	PC	Liberal	NDP	Natural Law	Independent	Incumbent
Cape Breton Centre	Julien Frison; 1,012; 10.99%	Russell MacNeil; 5,644; 61.28%	Victor Tomiczek; 2,554; 27.73%			Russell MacNeil
Cape Breton East	Greg Hicks; 1,069; 10.38%	John MacEachern; 7,566; 73.50%	Terry McVarish; 1,659; 16.12%			John MacEachern
Cape Breton North	Brian Young; 3,911; 36.43%	Ron Stewart; 5,459; 50.85%	Archie MacKinnon; 1,289; 12.01%		Ron Laffin; 76; 0.71%	Brian Young
Cape Breton Nova	Joe Currie; 443; 5.34%	Paul MacEwan; 6,816; 82.22%	Blair Riley; 1,031; 12.44%			Paul MacEwan
Cape Breton South	Norm Ferguson; 2,015; 20.59%	Manning MacDonald; 5,629; 57.52%	Peter Mancini; 2,143; 21.90%			Vince MacLean †
Cape Breton—The Lakes	Lauchie G. Leslie; 1,264; 13.79%	Bernie Boudreau; 6,591; 71.90%	Helen MacDonald; 1,312; 14.31%			Bernie Boudreau
Cape Breton West	Victor Hanham; 2,055; 19.56%	Russell MacKinnon; 7,355; 70.01%	Daniel O'Connor; 777; 7.40%		Wendy MacKenzie; 318; 3.03%	Russell MacKinnon
Inverness	Frank Crowdis; 2,944; 30.51%	Charles MacArthur; 5,804; 60.15%	Mary T. Goodwin; 902; 9.35%			Charles MacArthur; Inverness North
Richmond	Chuck Boudreau; 1,587; 21.70%	Richie Mann; 5,440; 74.40%	Wilf Cude; 285; 3.90%			Richie Mann
Victoria	Walter S. Brett; 1,488; 28.78%	Kennie MacAskill; 3,119; 60.32%	Gerald Yetman; 414; 8.01%		Stemer MacLeod; 150; 2.90%	Kennie MacAskill
