= Pierre E. Belliveau =

Canadian politician

MLA for Clare
- In office 1953–1963
- Preceded by: Desire J. Comeau
- Succeeded by: Hector J. Pothier

Personal details
- Born: May 18, 1896 Belliveau's Cove, Nova Scotia
- Died: September 20, 1966 (aged 70) Yarmouth, Nova Scotia
- Party: Liberal
- Occupation: Physician

Pierre E. Belliveau (May 18, 1896 – September 20, 1966) was a physician and political figure in Nova Scotia, Canada. He represented Clare in the Nova Scotia House of Assembly from 1953 to 1963 as a Liberal member.

He was born in Belliveau's Cove, Nova Scotia, the son of Isaie Beliveau and Alix Lombard. Belliveau was educated at the Collège Sainte-Anne and Dalhousie University. In 1924, he married Angèle Robichaud. He served as a director for Le petit Courrier du Sud-Ouest de la Nouvelle-Écosse, later Le Courrier de la Nouvelle-Écosse, at the time a small newssheet aimed at the local Acadian community. Belliveau died at Yarmouth on September 20, 1966.
