= Alexander MacIsaac =

Canadian politician

Alexander Angus MacIsaac

MLA for Guysborough
- In office June 7, 1960 – October 29, 1968
- Preceded by: Alexander W. Cameron
- Succeeded by: Angus MacIsaac

Personal details
- Born: July 18, 1907
- Died: October 29, 1968 (aged 61) Antigonish, Nova Scotia, Canada
- Party: Progressive Conservative

Alexander Angus "Tando" MacIsaac (July 18, 1907 – October 29, 1968) was a Nova Scotia politician and Member of the Legislature for Guysborough.

MacIsaac was first elected in the June 7, 1960, general election with a 189-vote margin. He was re-elected in the October 8, 1963, general election by 349 votes, and again in the May 30, 1967, general election by 329 votes.

MacIsaac died on October 29, 1968, as a result of a motor vehicle accident. In the subsequent by-election, his son Angus MacIsaac ran and was elected to the Nova Scotia House of Assembly.
