= William Akins Fergusson =

Canadian politician from Nova Scotia (1850–)

William Aikins Fergusson

Member of the Nova Scotia House of Assembly for Guysborough County
- In office April 20, 1897 – October 1, 1901

Personal details
- Born: September 17, 1850
- Died: unknown
- Party: Liberal
- Spouse: Charlotte M. Aikens
- Occupation: politician

William Aikins Fergusson (September 17, 1850 – unknown) was a political figure in Nova Scotia, Canada. He represented Guysborough County in the Nova Scotia House of Assembly from 1897 to 1901 as a Liberal member.

Fergusson was born in 1850 to James A. Fergusson and Sarah Jane Hughes. He was educated at Guysborough Academy and married Charlotte M. Aikens. He served as a councillor for the Municipality of Guysborough for seven years.

He was elected in the 1897 Nova Scotia general election and did not context the 1901 Nova Scotia general election.
