= Richard Hurlburt =

Canadian politician

The Honourable Richard Melbourne Hurlburt ECNS

Member of the Nova Scotia House of Assembly for Yarmouth
- In office August 16, 1999 – February 9, 2010
- Preceded by: John Deveau
- Succeeded by: Zach Churchill

Personal details
- Born: April 25, 1950 (age 76) Carleton, Nova Scotia
- Party: Progressive Conservative
- Spouse: Nancy
- Occupation: construction contractor

Richard Melbourne Hurlburt (born April 25, 1950) is a Canadian politician. He represented the electoral district of Yarmouth in the Nova Scotia House of Assembly from 1999 to 2010.

== Biography ==
In June 1999, he barely escaped with his life when his light plane crashed into a lake in Yarmouth County. He said he would have drowned if it had not been for a passenger who dragged him from the wreckage.

Hurlburt was a councillor for the Municipality of the District of Yarmouth for 11 years and was warden of that municipality for 5 years.

He was a member of the Progressive Conservatives. Until the cabinet of Premier Darrell Dexter was sworn in on June 19, 2009, Hurlburt served as Minister of Service Nova Scotia and Municipal Relations.

=== Expenses scandal ===
Hurlburt resigned from the legislature on February 9, 2010, following revelations that he had spent his constituency allowance on a generator and a 40" television, which together cost over $11,000. He sought sanctuary in Florida citing "severe depression" where he was visited by his son and his lawyer, Martin Pink.

On February 14, 2011, it was announced that Hurlburt was among four people facing criminal charges in connection with the RCMP investigation into 2010s MLA expense scandal. Hurlburt was charged with fraud exceeding $5,000, breach of trust by a public officer, and 3 counts of uttering a forged document.

On February 23, 2012, Hurlburt's lawyer said his client would plead guilty to fraud and breach of trust. In exchange, three charges of uttering forged documents were dropped. On April 12, 2012, Hurlburt pleaded guilty to fraud and breach of trust. On July 27, 2012, Hurlburt was sentenced to 12 months of house arrest, followed by 12 months of probation.
