= 61st Nova Scotia general election =

The 61st Nova Scotia general election may refer to

- the 2009 Nova Scotia general election, the 60th overall general election for Nova Scotia, for the (due to a counting error in 1859) 61st General Assembly of Nova Scotia, or
- the 2013 Nova Scotia general election, the 61st overall general election for Nova Scotia, for the 62nd General Assembly of Nova Scotia, but considered the 39th general election for the Canadian province of Nova Scotia.
