= Leroy Legere =

Canadian politician

The Honourable Leroy Legere ECNS

Member of the Nova Scotia House of Assembly for Yarmouth
- In office 1988–1993
- Preceded by: Alex McIntosh
- Succeeded by: Richie Hubbard

Personal details
- Born: August 24, 1945 (age 80)
- Party: Progressive Conservative

Joseph Leroy Legere (born August 24, 1945) is a Canadian politician. He represented the electoral district of Yarmouth in the Nova Scotia House of Assembly from 1988 to 1993. He was a member of the Progressive Conservative Party of Nova Scotia.

== Early life ==
Legere is the son of Felton Legere, a former Member of Parliament, and Etta Surette.

== Political career ==
Legere was elected in the 1988 election, defeating former Liberal MLA Fraser Mooney by 341 votes in the Yarmouth riding. He served in the Executive Council of Nova Scotia as Minister of Labour and Minister of Fisheries. He was Minister of Labour at the time of the Westray Mine disaster. His department was responsible for safety at the mine, and Legere faced criticism over his handling of the disaster. He was removed as Minister of Labour in November 1992, but kept the fisheries portfolio. In the 1993 election, he was defeated by Liberal Richie Hubbard.

== After politics ==
Following his defeat, he returned to the education field, and served as one of the two directors of schools for the Southwest Regional School Board. In June 2000, the Government of Nova Scotia divided the Southwest Regional School Board into two district boards, and Legere was named the chief executive officer for both the new Tri-County District School Board and the new South Shore District School Board. He also served as Regional Education Officer for the Nova Scotia Department of Education. In April 2013, Legere was appointed to the federal government's Social Security Tribunal, which handles all EI, Social Security and Canada Pension Plan appeals.
