= Chuck MacNeil =

Canadian politician (1944–2022)

The Honourable Chuck MacNeil ECNS

MLA for Guysborough
- In office 1984–1993
- Preceded by: Sandy Cameron
- Succeeded by: riding dissolved

Personal details
- Born: December 2, 1944 New Glasgow, Nova Scotia, Canada
- Died: June 18, 2022 (aged 77) New Glasgow, Nova Scotia, Canada
- Party: Progressive Conservative
- Occupation: Doctor

Charles Wyndham MacNeil (December 2, 1944 – June 18, 2022) was a Canadian politician. He represented the electoral district of Guysborough in the Nova Scotia House of Assembly from 1984 to 1993. He was a member of the Progressive Conservative Party of Nova Scotia.

Born in 1944 at New Glasgow, Nova Scotia, he was the son of Edgar William MacNeil and Elizabeth Adelaide (Weir). A graduate of Mount Allison University and Dalhousie University, MacNeil married Elizabeth Alison Fleming in 1966. He practiced as a family physician in Yarmouth and Sherbrooke, Nova Scotia since 1969.

From 1982 to 1984, MacNeil served as a municipal councillor for the Municipality of the District of St. Mary's. He entered provincial politics in the 1984 election, defeating Liberal leader Sandy Cameron by 390 votes in the Guysborough riding. MacNeil was re-elected in the 1988 election.

On December 23, 1988, MacNeil was appointed to the Executive Council of Nova Scotia as Minister of Lands and Forests. When Donald Cameron took over as premier in February 1991, he named MacNeil Minister of Mines and Energy.

In February 1992, MacNeil was shuffled to Minister of Finance. In the 1993 election, MacNeil was defeated by Liberal Ray White in the new Guysborough-Port Hawkesbury riding.

MacNeil died in New Glasgow, Nova Scotia on June 18, 2022, aged 77.
