= Lloyd Hines =

Canadian politician (1951/1952–2023)

The Honourable Lloyd Hines ECNS

Member of the Nova Scotia House of Assembly for Guysborough–Eastern Shore–Tracadie
- In office October 8, 2013 – July 17, 2021
- Preceded by: Jim Boudreau
- Succeeded by: Greg Morrow

Personal details
- Born: June 19, 1951 Neil's Harbour, Nova Scotia, Canada
- Died: September 11, 2023 (aged 72)
- Party: Liberal

Lloyd Patrick Hines (June 19, 1951 – September 10, 2023) was a Canadian politician. He was a member of the Nova Scotia Liberal Party and represented the electoral district of Guysborough–Eastern Shore–Tracadie from 2013 to 2021.

== Early life and education ==
Born in Neil's Harbour, Hines grew up in Ingonish and Baddeck. He graduated from St. Francis Xavier University with Bachelor of Arts in English Literature.

== Political career ==
Hines served as a Councillor Municipality of the District of Guysborough from 1988 to 2013 and as Warden from 1997 to 2013.

=== As MLA ===
Hines was elected to the Nova Scotia House of Assembly in the 2013 provincial election in the electoral district of Guysborough–Eastern Shore–Tracadie.

On July 24, 2015, Hines was appointed to the Executive Council of Nova Scotia as Minister of Natural Resources.

In April 2017, Nova Scotia's Office of the Ombudsman published a report that criticized senior officials of the Municipality of the District of Guysborough, including former warden Hines, for their "indulgent" spending and "opportunistic" practices. The report noted that Hines had used his corporate credit card for thousands of dollars in personal purchases and cash advances. Although Hines repaid all the charges, the Ombudsman found that he had benefited by essentially using cash advances from the municipality as short-term loans to cover expenses.

The report also noted that there was insufficient documentation of the purpose of expensed meals, which were often above standard per diem rates and included alcohol, even when the only attendees were council members or administrators such as Hines. Hines defended the higher rates and the expensing of alcohol, telling the Ombudsman that the costs and alcohol were often standard when municipality officials hosted guests with more expensive tastes that they wanted to persuade to invest in the community.

Hines was re-elected in the 2017 election, although his margin of victory of 71 votes was thin enough that the Progressive Conservatives sought a judicial recount, which confirmed the result.

On June 15, 2017, premier Stephen McNeil shuffled his cabinet, moving Hines to Minister of Transportation and Infrastructure Renewal. In October 2017, Hines indicated his support for the renewal of Bay Ferries to continue operating "The Cat" ferry between Yarmouth, Nova Scotia and Portland, Maine, citing the ridership increases in the past year despite engine problems.

Hines came under fire in February 2019 after a media scrum where he failed to disclose any information about the Yarmouth-Maine Ferry contract which he was responsible for.

Hines was defeated in the 2021 general election by Greg Morrow of the Progressive Conservatives.

== Death ==
He died on September 10, 2023, at the age of 72.

== Electoral record ==
2021 Nova Scotia general election
Party	Candidate	Votes	%	±%
Progressive Conservative	Greg Morrow	3,281	63.39	+21.49
Liberal	Lloyd Hines	1,571	30.35	-12.74
New Democratic	Matt Stickland	247	4.77	-10.23
Green	Gabriel Bruce	77	1.49	n/a
Total valid votes		5,176	100.0	
Total rejected ballots		13	0.25	
Turnout		5,189	66.81	
Eligible voters		7,767		

2017 Nova Scotia general election
Party	Candidate	Votes	%	±%
Liberal	Lloyd Hines	2,565	43.09	+3.10
Progressive Conservative	Rob Wolf	2,494	41.90	+14.82
New Democratic	Marney Simmons	893	15.00	-17.93
Total valid votes		5,952	100.0	
Total rejected ballots		65	1.08	
Turnout		6,017	59.05	
Eligible voters		10,189		

2013 Nova Scotia general election
Party	Candidate	Votes	%	±%
Liberal	Lloyd Hines	2,876	39.99	N/A
New Democratic Party	Jim Boudreau	2,368	32.93	N/A
Progressive Conservative	Neil Decoff	1,947	27.08	N/A
