= John Deveau =

Canadian politician

Member of the Nova Scotia House of Assembly for Yarmouth
- In office 1998–1999
- Preceded by: Richie Hubbard
- Succeeded by: Richard Hurlburt

Personal details
- Born: John William Deveau; September 2, 1961 Saint John, New Brunswick
- Died: July 31, 2025 (aged 63) Yarmouth, Nova Scotia
- Party: New Democratic Party
- Occupation: Personal-care worker

John William Deveau (September 2, 1961 – July 31, 2025) was a Canadian politician, representing the electoral district of Yarmouth in the Nova Scotia House of Assembly from 1998 to 1999. He was a member of the Nova Scotia New Democratic Party.

He was a personal-care worker, employed at an adult residential centre before entering provincial politics. Deveau defeated incumbent Richie Hubbard and former MLA Alex McIntosh to win the Yarmouth riding for the NDP in the 1998 provincial election, becoming the first New Democrat to ever win a seat in western Nova Scotia. As MLA, he was the NDP critic for Fisheries and Aquaculture. He was defeated by Progressive Conservative Richard Hurlburt when he ran for re-election in 1999.

Deveau attempted to win back the seat in the 2006 election, but was again defeated by Hurlburt. In 2010, Hurlburt resigned as MLA, and Deveau won the NDP nomination for the by-election held to replace him. Deveau's attempt to win a seat in the NDP government was unsuccessful, as Zach Churchill won the seat for the Liberals. Deveau finished the by-election in fourth place, winning 6.5% of the vote.

== Electoral history ==
By-election June 22, 2010
Party	Candidate	Votes	%	±%
Liberal	Zach Churchill	3,986	50.67	+36.60
Progressive Conservative	Charles Crosby	2,628	33.40	-27.94
Independent	Belle Hatfield	673	8.55	Ø
New Democratic Party	John Deveau	513	6.52	-16.41
Green	John Percy	48	0.61	-1.05
Atlantica	Jonathan Dean	19	0.24	Ø
Total valid votes		7,867	100.00	
Total rejected ballots		50	0.63	
Turnout		7,917	59.25	
Eligible voters		13,361		

2006 Nova Scotia general election: Yarmouth
Party	Candidate	Votes	%	±%
Progressive Conservative	Richard Hurlburt	5,170	64.30%	7.83%
New Democratic	John Deveau	1,667	20.73%	6.88%
Liberal	Dolores Atwood	1,051	13.07%	-16.60%
Green	Matthew Granger	152	1.89%	–
Total valid votes		8,040	100.00	
Total rejected ballots		20	0.25	
Turnout		8,060	68.33	
Eligible voters		12,849		
Source(s) Source: Nova Scotia Legislature (2021). "Electoral History for Yarmouth" (PDF). nslegislature.ca.

1999 Nova Scotia general election: Yarmouth
Party	Candidate	Votes	%	±%
Progressive Conservative	Richard Hurlburt	3,141	34.02%	4.05%
New Democratic	John Deveau	3,079	33.34%	-11.47%
Liberal	Phil DeMille	2,605	28.21%	2.99%
Nova Scotia Party	Brian W. Hurlburt	409	4.43%	–
Total valid votes		9,234	100.00	
Total rejected ballots		58	0.62	
Turnout		9,292	74.54	
Eligible voters		12,465		
Source(s) Source: Nova Scotia Legislature (2021). "Electoral History for Yarmouth" (PDF). nslegislature.ca.

1998 Nova Scotia general election: Yarmouth
Party	Candidate	Votes	%	±%
New Democratic	John Deveau	3,931	44.81%	30.02%
Progressive Conservative	Alex McIntosh	2,629	29.97%	-2.11%
Liberal	Richie Hubbard	2,212	25.22%	-27.91%
Total valid votes		8,772	100.00	
Total rejected ballots		53	0.60	
Turnout		8,825	71.16	
Eligible voters		12,402		
Source(s) Source: Nova Scotia Legislature (2021). "Electoral History for Yarmouth" (PDF). nslegislature.ca.
