= Angus MacIsaac =

Canadian politician, educator, and businessman

The Honourable Angus MacIsaac ECNS

Member of the Nova Scotia House of Assembly for Antigonish
- In office July 27, 1999 – September 4, 2009
- Preceded by: Hyland Fraser
- Succeeded by: Maurice Smith

Member of the Nova Scotia House of Assembly for Guysborough
- In office February 11, 1969 – September 17, 1972
- Preceded by: Alexander MacIsaac
- Succeeded by: Sandy Cameron

Personal details
- Born: June 4, 1943 (age 82) London, United Kingdom
- Party: Progressive Conservative

Angus "Tando" MacIsaac (born June 4, 1943) is a politician, educator and businessman in Nova Scotia, Canada.

== Political career ==
Angus MacIsaac's father, Alexander MacIsaac, was MLA of Guysborough prior to October 1968. Upon Alexander MacIsaac's death, a by-election was called. Angus MacIsaac, then 25 years old, ran, and was first elected to the Nova Scotia House of Assembly on February 11, 1969. MacIsaac ran as a Progressive Conservative and obtained a 371-vote margin of victory.

MacIsaac was re-elected with a 265-vote margin on October 13, 1970, in a general election.

On September 17, 1972, MacIsaac resigned his seat to run federally for the Progressive Conservatives in Cape Breton Highlands—Canso. He made two unsuccessful attempts to win the seat in the 1972 and 1974 federal elections.

MacIsaac made a successful return to political office in the 1999 provincial election, running in the electoral district of Antigonish. He won the seat with just 12 votes more than the Liberal incumbent.

In the 2003 provincial election MacIsaac was re-elected, increasing his margin to 606 votes.

He was one of the strongest supporters of Rodney MacDonald in the 2006 Nova Scotia PC leadership election.

MacIsaac received his largest margin of victory in the 2006 general election, achieving 1676 more votes than his nearest challenger.

MacIsaac was re-elected in the 2009 election with a 275-vote margin over the NDP candidate.

On September 4, 2009, MacIsaac resigned his seat, citing family reasons.

During his career in provincial politics, MacIsaac served as Minister of Health, Minister of Education, and Minister of Housing under John Hamm, and during his tenure in Rodney MacDonald's government, served as Deputy Premier, Minister of Transportation and Public Works, Minister of Economic Development, and was the Minister of the then newly formed Department of Gaelic Affairs.

== Teaching career ==
MacIsaac is a graduate of Nova Scotia Teachers College and St. Francis Xavier University where he received a Bachelor of Arts.

When not holding political office, MacIsaac taught at Junior High School and Senior High School levels in Calgary, Canso, Antigonish, and Guysborough.

== Family ==
MacIsaac is married to Mary Ann (née Milner). They have two children.
