= Ron Chisholm =

Canadian politician

The Honourable Ron Chisholm ECNS

Member of the Nova Scotia House of Assembly for Guysborough-Sheet Harbour Guysborough-Port Hawkesbury (1999-2003)
- In office July 27, 1999 – June 9, 2009
- Preceded by: Ray White
- Succeeded by: Jim Boudreau

Personal details
- Born: September 30, 1948 (age 77)
- Party: Progressive Conservative
- Occupation: machinist, advertising manager

Ron Chisholm (born September 30, 1948) is a Canadian politician. He represented the electoral districts of Guysborough-Port Hawkesbury and Guysborough-Sheet Harbour in the Nova Scotia House of Assembly from 1999 to 2009 as a member of the Progressive Conservatives.

Born in 1948 at Goshen, Nova Scotia, Chisholm married Alberta McGrath. From 1969 to 1980, he was employed with Nova Scotia Power, as a machine operator. In 1980, he was elected business manager for the International Brotherhood of Electrical Workers, where he represented 1300 unionized workers. He was later employed with the Nova Scotia Department of Transportation, and the Guysborough Journal as advertising manager.

Chisholm served as a municipal councillor in the District of St. Mary's from 1988 to 1999, serving as Warden from 1994 to 1999. Chisholm first attempted to enter provincial politics in the 1998 election, but was defeated by Liberal incumbent Ray White. Chisholm ran again in 1999, and defeated White by 134 votes. He was re-elected in the newly established Guysborough-Sheet Harbour riding in the 2003 election. When Rodney MacDonald took over as premier in February 2006, Chisholm was appointed to the Executive Council of Nova Scotia, as Minister of Agriculture, and Minister of Fisheries and Aquaculture. He was re-elected in 2006, and retained the fisheries and aquaculture portfolio in a post-election cabinet shuffle. Chisholm was defeated when he ran for re-election in 2009, losing to New Democrat Jim Boudreau by more than 1800 votes.
