= Guy LeBlanc (Nova Scotia politician) =

Canadian politician

The Honourable Guy LeBlanc ECNS

MLA for Clare
- In office 1984–1993
- Preceded by: Chester Melanson
- Succeeded by: Wayne Gaudet

Personal details
- Born: May 2, 1950 (age 75) Saulnierville, Nova Scotia
- Party: Progressive Conservative

Guy Joseph LeBlanc (born May 2, 1950) is a Canadian politician. He represented the electoral district of Clare in the Nova Scotia House of Assembly from 1984 to 1993. He was a member of the Progressive Conservative Party of Nova Scotia.

Born in 1950 at Saulnierville, Nova Scotia, LeBlanc was first elected in the 1984 provincial election, and re-elected in 1988. He was defeated by Liberal Wayne Gaudet when he ran for re-election in 1993. LeBlanc was in the Executive Council of Nova Scotia as minister of environment, minister of transportation, minister of community services and minister of education. LeBlanc attempted a political comeback in the 1998 election, but was again defeated by Gaudet. In October 2000, LeBlanc was named regional education officer responsible for both the Acadian and Annapolis Valley Regional School Boards.
