= Chester Melanson =

Canadian politician

Chester J. Melanson

MLA for Clare
- In office 1981–1984
- Preceded by: Benoit Comeau
- Succeeded by: Guy LeBlanc

Personal details
- Born: June 26, 1940 (age 85) Meteghan Centre, Nova Scotia
- Party: Liberal
- Occupation: Athletic director

Chester Joseph Melanson (born June 26, 1940) is a Canadian politician. He represented the electoral district of Clare in the Nova Scotia House of Assembly from 1981 to 1984 as a member of the Nova Scotia Liberal Party.

Melanson was born in 1940 at Meteghan Centre, Digby County, Nova Scotia. A graduate of the University of New Brunswick, Melanson was an athletic director. He entered provincial politics in the 1981 election, defeating Progressive Conservative Guy LeBlanc by 55 votes in the Clare riding. Melanson was defeated by LeBlanc when he ran for re-election in 1984.

In October 2008, Melanson was awarded the Order of La Pléiade, which was given to honour Acadian and Francophone community leaders, and Members of the Legislative Assembly.
