= Ray White (politician) =

Canadian politician

The Honourable Ray White ECNS

MLA for Guysborough-Port Hawkesbury
- In office 1993–1999
- Preceded by: riding established
- Succeeded by: Ron Chisholm

Personal details
- Party: Liberal

Ray White is a former Canadian politician. He represented the electoral district of Guysborough-Port Hawkesbury in the Nova Scotia House of Assembly from 1993 to 1999. He was a member of the Nova Scotia Liberal Party.

White served five terms as mayor of Canso, Nova Scotia before resigning to enter provincial politics. In the 1993 provincial election, White defeated finance minister Chuck MacNeil to win the Guysborough-Port Hawkesbury riding. He served as a backbench MLA in John Savage's government. He was re-elected in the 1998 election, defeating Progressive Conservative Ron Chisholm by 721 votes.

Following the election, White was named the government's caucus chairman. On December 11, 1998, White was appointed to the Executive Council of Nova Scotia as Minister of Housing and Municipal Affairs. In the 1999 election, White and Chisholm did battle again, with Chisholm winning the seat by 134 votes. White later returned to municipal politics, again becoming mayor of Canso. He did not seek re-election in the 2008 municipal election.

In 2012, White was a recipient of the Queen Elizabeth II Diamond Jubilee Medal.
