= Danny Graham (Cape Breton politician) =

Canadian politician

MLA for Inverness South
- In office 1988–1993
- Preceded by: Billy Joe MacLean
- Succeeded by: riding dissolved

Personal details
- Born: October 26, 1950 (age 75) Sydney, Nova Scotia, Canada
- Party: Liberal

Daniel Graham (born October 26, 1950) is from Judique, Nova Scotia and is a former Member of the Legislative Assembly of Nova Scotia, Canada. He was elected to the Nova Scotia House of Assembly in the 1988 provincial election. He represented the electoral district of Inverness South until 1993 as a Liberal member.

Prior to the 1993 election, Graham was defeated by Inverness North MLA Charlie MacArthur for the Liberal nomination in the redistributed riding of Inverness. Graham ran for the Liberal nomination again in the 1998 election, but was defeated by Charlie MacDonald.
