= Greg Morrow (politician) =

Canadian politician (born 1981)

The Honourable Greg Morrow ECNS MLA

Member of the Nova Scotia House of Assembly for Guysborough-Tracadie
- Incumbent
- Assumed office August 17, 2021
- Preceded by: Lloyd Hines

Personal details
- Born: May 25, 1981 (age 44) Antigonish, Nova Scotia
- Party: Progressive Conservative
- Occupation: journalist

Greg Morrow (born May 25, 1981) is a Canadian politician who was elected to the Nova Scotia House of Assembly in the 2021 Nova Scotia general election. He represents the riding of Guysborough-Tracadie as a member of the Progressive Conservative Association of Nova Scotia.

On August 31, 2021, Morrow was made Minister of Agriculture.

Prior to his election to the legislature, Morrow was a radio journalist and news director for CIGO-FM in Port Hawkesbury.

== Electoral record ==
2024 Nova Scotia general election: Guysborough-Tracadie
Party	Candidate	Votes	%	±%
Progressive Conservative	Greg Morrow	3,128	77.46%	+14.08%
Liberal	George Grant	590	14.61%	-15.74%
New Democratic	Deborah Martinello	320	7.92%	+3.15%
Total valid votes		4,078		
Total rejected ballots		37		
Total declined ballots		3		
Turnout		4,078		
Eligible voters		8,018		
Progressive Conservative hold		Swing		
Source: Elections Nova Scotia

2021 Nova Scotia general election: Guysborough-Tracadie
Party	Candidate	Votes	%	±%	Expenditures
Progressive Conservative	Greg Morrow	3,281	63.39	+20.98	$40,621.88
Liberal	Lloyd Hines	1,571	30.35	-12.96	$41,669.45
New Democratic	Matt Stickland	247	4.77	-9.51	$13,174.92
Green	Gabriel Bruce	77	1.49	–	$200.00
Total valid votes/expense limit		5,176	99.75	–	$49,031.47
Total rejected ballots		13	0.25		
Turnout		5,189	66.81		
Eligible voters		7,767			
Progressive Conservative gain from Liberal		Swing		+16.97	
Source: Elections Nova Scotia
