= Alex McIntosh (politician) =

Canadian politician (1934–2023)

Member of the Nova Scotia House of Assembly for Yarmouth
- In office 1984–1988
- Preceded by: Fraser Mooney
- Succeeded by: Leroy Legere

Personal details
- Born: March 19, 1934 Glace Bay, Nova Scotia, Canada
- Died: September 4, 2023 (aged 89)
- Party: Progressive Conservative
- Spouse: Mary Carmel Chiasson
- Children: three
- Occupation: Station agent

Alexander Joseph McIntosh (March 19, 1934 – September 4, 2023) was a Canadian politician. He represented the electoral district of Yarmouth in the Nova Scotia House of Assembly from 1984 to 1988. He was a member of the Progressive Conservative Party of Nova Scotia.

McIntosh was born in Glace Bay in 1934. He entered provincial politics in the 1984 election, defeating Liberal incumbent Fraser Mooney by 645 votes in the Yarmouth riding. McIntosh did not seek re-election in 1988. In the 1998 election, McIntosh ran again in Yarmouth, but was defeated by New Democrat John Deveau. He finished second in the race, ahead of Liberal incumbent Richie Hubbard.

McIntosh died on September 4, 2023, at the age of 89.
