= Jim Boudreau =

Canadian politician

MLA for Guysborough-Sheet Harbour
- In office June 9, 2009 – October 8, 2013
- Preceded by: Ron Chisholm
- Succeeded by: Lloyd Hines

Personal details
- Party: Nova Scotia New Democratic Party

Jim Boudreau is a Canadian politician, who was elected to the Nova Scotia House of Assembly in the 2009 provincial election. He represented the electoral district of Guysborough-Sheet Harbour as a member of the New Democratic Party.

In June 2009, Boudreau was appointed the Ministerial Assistant for the Department of Fisheries and Aquaculture.

In May 2013, Boudreau's private member bill to officially recognize Nova Scotia's provincial flag passed third reading in the Nova Scotia legislature. It was an 11-year-old constituent of Boudreau's who, while doing research for a school project, discovered that the flag had never been officially recognized, despite being in use since 1858.

Boudreau was defeated when he ran for re-election in 2013.
