= Hector J. Pothier =

Canadian politician

Hector Joseph Pothier

MLA for Clare
- In office 1963–1967
- Preceded by: Pierre E. Belliveau
- Succeeded by: Benoit Comeau

Personal details
- Born: September 26, 1891 Eel Brook, Nova Scotia
- Died: January 7, 1977 (aged 85) Yarmouth, Nova Scotia
- Party: Progressive Conservative
- Occupation: physician

Hector Joseph Pothier CM (September 26, 1891 – January 7, 1977) was a physician and political figure in Nova Scotia, Canada. He represented Clare in the Nova Scotia House of Assembly from 1963 to 1967 as a Progressive Conservative member.

== Early life and education ==
Born in Eel Brook, Yarmouth County, Nova Scotia, he was the son of Sylvain Pothier and Françoise Bourque. Pothier was educated at Saint Anne's College and Dalhousie Medical School, graduating in 1919. A fourth year medical student at the time of the Halifax Explosion, Pothier was called into service to help treat the survivors. Pothier continued his medical studies at Saint Vincent's Hospital in New York City.

== Medical career ==
He returned to Nova Scotia after graduation, setting up practice in Weymouth. After retiring from politics, he returned to practice in Beaver River.

== Death ==
Pothier died in Yarmouth, Nova Scotia on January 7, 1977.

== Posthumous recognition ==
A bursary is offered in his name by the Dalhousie University Faculty of Medicine to assist a student in need who is interested in practising in a rural community.
