= Clare (electoral district) =

Provincial electoral district in Nova Scotia, Canada

Nova Scotia electoral district

Provincial electoral district
- Legislature: Nova Scotia House of Assembly
MLA
Ryan Robicheau
Progressive Conservative
- District created: 1949, 2019
- District abolished: 2013
- Last contested: 2024

Demographics
- Population (2021): 7,687
- Electors (2024): 7,206
- Area (km²): 830
- Pop. density (per km²): 9.3
- Census division: Digby County
- Census subdivision: Municipality of the District of Clare

Clare is a provincial electoral district in Nova Scotia, Canada, which existed between 1949-2013 and since 2021. Prior to 1949, Clare was part of Digby district. It elects one member of the Nova Scotia House of Assembly. The electoral district includes most of the Municipality of the District of Clare, an Acadian area occupying the southwestern half of Digby County. For four consecutive elections from 1988 to 1999, the district had the highest voter turnout in the province.

The electoral district was abolished following the 2012 electoral boundary review and was largely replaced by the new electoral district of Clare-Digby. It was re-created out of Clare-Digby following the 2019 Electoral Boundary Review after a court challenge that also re-instated the province's two other protected Acadians ridings of Argyle and Richmond, and the Black riding of Preston.

== Geography ==
The land area of Clare is 830 km^{2} (320 sq mi).

== Members of the Legislative Assembly ==
The electoral district was represented by the following members of the Legislative Assembly:

Clare
Legislature	Years	Member	Party
Riding created from Digby
44th	1949–1953	Desire Comeau	Progressive Conservative
45th	1953–1956	Pierre Belliveau	Liberal
46th	1956–1960	Pierre Belliveau	Liberal
47th	1960–1963	Pierre Belliveau	Liberal
48th	1963–1967	Hector J. Pothier	Progressive Conservative
49th	1967–1970	Benoit Comeau	Liberal
50th	1970–1974	Benoit Comeau	Liberal
51st	1974–1978	Benoit Comeau	Liberal
52nd	1978–1981	Benoit Comeau	Liberal
53rd	1981–1984	Chester Melanson	Liberal
54th	1984–1988	Guy LeBlanc	Progressive Conservative
55th	1988–1993	Guy LeBlanc	Progressive Conservative
56th	1993–1998	Wayne Gaudet	Liberal
57th	1998–1999	Wayne Gaudet	Liberal
58th	1999–2003	Wayne Gaudet	Liberal
59th	2003–2006	Wayne Gaudet	Liberal
60th	2006–2009	Wayne Gaudet	Liberal
61st	2009–2013	Wayne Gaudet	Liberal
Riding dissolved into Clare-Digby
Riding recreated from Clare-Digby
64th	2021–2024	Ronnie LeBlanc	Liberal
65th	2024–present	Ryan Robicheau	Progressive Conservative

== Election results ==
=== 2024 ===
2024 Nova Scotia general election
Party	Candidate	Votes	%	±%
Progressive Conservative	Ryan Robicheau	2,805	59.71	+16.29
Liberal	Ronnie LeBlanc	1,790	38.10	-11.79
New Democratic	Dre Taylor	103	2.19	-1.10
Total valid votes		4,698	99.22	
Total rejected ballots		51	1.07	+0.22
Turnout		4,749	65.90	-1.19
Eligible voters		7,206		
Progressive Conservative gain from Liberal		Swing		+14.00
Source: Elections Nova Scotia

=== 2021 ===
2021 Nova Scotia general election
Party	Candidate	Votes	%	±%	Expenditures
Liberal	Ronnie LeBlanc	2,322	49.89	-1.34	$37,791.91
Progressive Conservative	Carl Deveau	2,021	43.43	+13.12	$13,595.33
Green	Claire McDonald	158	3.39	–	$200.00
New Democratic	Cameron Pye	153	3.29	-15.17	$10,832.43
Total valid votes/expense limit		4,654	99.15	–	$44,268.32
Total rejected ballots		40	0.85		
Turnout		4,694	67.19		
Eligible voters		6,986			
Liberal notional hold		Swing		-7.23	
Source: Elections Nova Scotia

=== 2017 (transposed) ===
2017 provincial election redistributed results
Party	Vote	%
Liberal	2,059	51.23
Progressive Conservative	1,218	30.31
New Democratic	742	18.46

=== 2009 ===
2009 Nova Scotia general election
Party	Candidate	Votes	%	±%
Liberal	Wayne Gaudet	3,392	64.68%	16.16%
New Democratic	Paul Comeau	1,326	25.29%	3.32%
Progressive Conservative	Jimmy Doucet	459	8.75%	-19.33%
Green	Diane Doucet-Bean	67	1.28%	-0.14%
Total		5,244	–	
Total rejected ballots		53		
Turnout		5,297	76.71	
Eligible voters		6,905		
Source(s) Source: Nova Scotia Legislature (2024). "Electoral History for Clare" (PDF). nslegislature.ca.

=== 2006 ===
2006 Nova Scotia general election
Party	Candidate	Votes	%	±%
Liberal	Wayne Gaudet	2,803	48.53%	-13.02%
Progressive Conservative	Abraham LeBlanc	1,622	28.08%	2.82%
New Democratic	Paul Comeau	1,269	21.97%	8.78%
Green	Diane Doucet-Bean	82	1.42%	–
Total		5,776	–	
Total rejected ballots		50		
Turnout		5,826	82.45	
Eligible voters		7,066		
Source(s) Source: Nova Scotia Legislature (2024). "Electoral History for Clare" (PDF). nslegislature.ca.

=== 2003 ===
2003 Nova Scotia general election
Party	Candidate	Votes	%	±%
Liberal	Wayne Gaudet	3,547	61.55%	17.78%
Progressive Conservative	Marc Boudreau	1,456	25.26%	-12.84%
New Democratic	Don Melanson	760	13.19%	-4.25%
Total		5,763	–	
Total rejected ballots		70		
Turnout		5,833	89.68	
Eligible voters		6,504		
Source(s) Source: Nova Scotia Legislature (2024). "Electoral History for Clare" (PDF). nslegislature.ca.

=== 1999 ===
1999 Nova Scotia general election
Party	Candidate	Votes	%	±%
Liberal	Wayne Gaudet	2,705	43.76%	-3.52%
Progressive Conservative	Paul Comeau	2,355	38.10%	-3.22%
New Democratic	Don Melanson	1,078	17.44%	6.04%
Nova Scotia Party	Anne Marie Boyer	43	0.70%	–
Total		6,181	–	
Total rejected ballots		66		
Turnout		6,247	87.43	
Eligible voters		7,145		
Source(s) Source: Nova Scotia Legislature (2024). "Electoral History for Clare" (PDF). nslegislature.ca. Nova Scotia, Chief Electoral Officer (1999). Returns of the General Election for the House of Assembly, Thirty-Fifth General Election (Report). Elections Nova Scotia.

=== 1998 ===
1998 Nova Scotia general election
Party	Candidate	Votes	%	±%
Liberal	Wayne Gaudet	2,950	47.28%	-4.71%
Progressive Conservative	Guy LeBlanc	2,578	41.32%	-1.55%
New Democratic	Vanessa Paddock	711	11.40%	6.26%
Total		6,239	–	
Total rejected ballots		109		
Turnout		6,348	88.00	
Eligible voters		7,214		
Source(s) Source: Nova Scotia Legislature (2024). "Electoral History for Clare" (PDF). nslegislature.ca.1998 Election Returns: Recapitulation (PDF) (Report). Elections Nova Scotia. 1998. Archived from the original (PDF) on 11 November 2021.

=== 1993 ===
1993 Nova Scotia general election
Party	Candidate	Votes	%	±%
Liberal	Wayne Gaudet	3,461	51.99%	10.23%
Progressive Conservative	Guy LeBlanc	2,854	42.87%	-11.15%
New Democratic	Christian Collin	342	5.14%	0.92%
Total		6,657	–	
Total rejected ballots		83		
Turnout		6,740	91.44	
Eligible voters		7,371		
Source(s) Source: Nova Scotia Legislature (2024). "Electoral History for Clare" (PDF). nslegislature.ca. Nova Scotia, Chief Electoral Officer (1993). Returns of the General Election for the House of Assembly, Thirty-Third General Election (PDF) (Report). Queen's Printer. Archived from the original (PDF) on 18 June 2018.

=== 1988 ===
1988 Nova Scotia general election
Party	Candidate	Votes	%	±%
Progressive Conservative	Guy LeBlanc	3,587	54.02%	3.69%
Liberal	Nadine Boudreau	2,773	41.76%	-3.53%
New Democratic	Jan Slakov-Crombie	280	4.22%	-0.16%
Total		6,640	–	
Source(s) Source: Nova Scotia Legislature (2024). "Electoral History for Clare" (PDF). nslegislature.ca. Nova Scotia, Chief Electoral Officer (1988). Returns of the General Election for the House of Assembly, Thirty-Second General Election (PDF) (Report). Queen's Printer. Archived from the original (PDF) on 7 July 2018.

=== 1984 ===
1984 Nova Scotia general election
Party	Candidate	Votes	%	±%
Progressive Conservative	Guy LeBlanc	3,094	50.33%	12.33%
Liberal	Chester Melanson	2,784	45.29%	6.33%
New Democratic	Alain Chabot	269	4.38%	-18.66%
Total		6,147	–	
Source(s) Source: Nova Scotia Legislature (2024). "Electoral History for Clare" (PDF). nslegislature.ca. Nova Scotia, Chief Electoral Officer (1984). Returns of the General Election for the House of Assembly, Thirty-First General Election (PDF) (Report). Queen's Printer. Archived from the original (PDF) on 31 July 2017.

=== 1981 ===
1981 Nova Scotia general election
Party	Candidate	Votes	%	±%
Liberal	Chester Melanson	2,228	38.96%	-17.51%
Progressive Conservative	Guy LeBlanc	2,173	38.00%	1.87%
New Democratic	Paul Dennis Comeau	1,317	23.03%	15.64%
Total		5,718	–	
Source(s) Source: Nova Scotia Legislature (2024). "Electoral History for Clare" (PDF). nslegislature.ca. Nova Scotia, Chief Electoral Officer (1981). Returns of the General Election for the House of Assembly, Thirtieth General Election (PDF) (Report). Queen's Printer. Archived from the original (PDF) on 31 July 2017.

=== 1978 ===
1978 Nova Scotia general election
Party	Candidate	Votes	%	±%
Liberal	Benoit Comeau	2,963	56.47%	-4.60%
Progressive Conservative	Gerald J. B. Comeau	1,896	36.13%	11.00%
New Democratic	Sylvio Gagnon	388	7.39%	-6.39%
Total		5,247	–	
Source(s) Source: Nova Scotia Legislature (2024). "Electoral History for Clare" (PDF). nslegislature.ca. Nova Scotia, Chief Electoral Officer (1978). Returns of the General Election for the House of Assembly, Twenty-Ninth General Election (PDF) (Report). Queen's Printer. Archived from the original (PDF) on 18 June 2018.

=== 1974 ===
1974 Nova Scotia general election
Party	Candidate	Votes	%	±%
Liberal	Benoit Comeau	2,959	61.07%	1.40%
Progressive Conservative	Vincent L. Doucet	1,218	25.14%	-15.19%
New Democratic	Jean L. Belliveau	668	13.79%	–
Total		4,845	–	
Source(s) Source: Nova Scotia Legislature (2024). "Electoral History for Clare" (PDF). nslegislature.ca. Nova Scotia, Chief Electoral Officer (1974). Returns of the General Election for the House of Assembly, Twenty-Eighth General Election (PDF) (Report). Queen's Printer. Archived from the original (PDF) on 18 June 2018.

=== 1970 ===
1970 Nova Scotia general election
Party	Candidate	Votes	%	±%
Liberal	Benoit Comeau	2,712	59.67%	3.24%
Progressive Conservative	Paul J. Comeau	1,833	40.33%	-3.24%
Total		4,545	–	
Source(s) Source: Nova Scotia Legislature (2024). "Electoral History for Clare" (PDF). nslegislature.ca. Nova Scotia, Legislative Assembly (1970). Returns of the General Election for the House of Assembly, 1970 (PDF) (Report). Queen's Printer. Archived from the original (PDF) on 25 July 2018.

=== 1967 ===
1967 Nova Scotia general election
Party	Candidate	Votes	%	±%
Liberal	Benoit Comeau	2,384	56.43%	9.04%
Progressive Conservative	Hector J. Pothier	1,841	43.57%	-9.04%
Total		4,225	–	
Source(s) Source: Nova Scotia Legislature (2024). "Electoral History for Clare" (PDF). nslegislature.ca. Nova Scotia Legislature (1967). Returns of the General Election for the House of Assembly (PDF) (Report). Queen's Printer. Archived from the original (PDF) on 25 July 2018.

=== 1963 ===
1963 Nova Scotia general election
Party	Candidate	Votes	%	±%
Progressive Conservative	Hector J. Pothier	2,154	52.61%	4.74%
Liberal	Joseph C. LeBlanc	1,940	47.39%	-4.74%
Total		4,094	–	
Source(s) Source: Nova Scotia Legislature (2024). "Electoral History for Clare" (PDF). nslegislature.ca. Nova Scotia Legislature (1963). Returns of the General Election for the House of Assembly (PDF) (Report). Queen's Printer. Archived from the original (PDF) on 25 July 2018.

=== 1960 ===
1960 Nova Scotia general election
Party	Candidate	Votes	%	±%
Liberal	Pierre E. Belliveau	2,215	52.13%	-0.47%
Progressive Conservative	Kenneth Weaver	2,034	47.87%	0.47%
Total		4,249	–	
Source(s) Source: Nova Scotia Legislature (2024). "Electoral History for Clare" (PDF). nslegislature.ca. Nova Scotia Legislature (1960). Returns of the General Election for the House of Assembly (PDF) (Report). Queen's Printer. Archived from the original (PDF) on 25 July 2018.

=== 1956 ===
1956 Nova Scotia general election
Party	Candidate	Votes	%	±%
Liberal	Pierre E. Belliveau	2,046	52.60%	-5.87%
Progressive Conservative	J. Fred Gaudet	1,844	47.40%	5.87%
Total		3,890	–	
Source(s) Source: Nova Scotia Legislature (2024). "Electoral History for Clare" (PDF). nslegislature.ca. Nova Scotia Legislature (1956). Returns of the General Election for the House of Assembly (PDF) (Report). Queen's Printer. Archived from the original (PDF) on 10 September 2018.

=== 1953 ===
1953 Nova Scotia general election
Party	Candidate	Votes	%	±%
Liberal	Pierre E. Belliveau	2,307	58.46%	8.92%
Progressive Conservative	Desire J. Comeau	1,639	41.54%	–
Total		3,946	–	
Source(s) Source: Nova Scotia Legislature (2024). "Electoral History for Clare" (PDF). nslegislature.ca. Nova Scotia Legislature (1953). Returns of the General Election for the House of Assembly (PDF) (Report). Queen's Printer. Archived from the original (PDF) on 10 September 2018.

=== 1949 ===
1949 Nova Scotia general election
Party	Candidate	Votes	%	±%
Liberal-Conservative	Desire J. Comeau	2,116	50.45%	–
Liberal	Benoit Comeau	2,078	49.55%	–
Total		4,194	–	
Source(s) Source: Nova Scotia Legislature (2024). "Electoral History for Clare" (PDF). nslegislature.ca. Nova Scotia Legislature (1949). Returns of the General Election for the House of Assembly (PDF) (Report). Queen's Printer. Archived from the original (PDF) on 10 September 2018.

== See also ==
- List of Nova Scotia provincial electoral districts
- Canadian provincial electoral districts
