= Alexander N. McDonald =

Canadian politician

Alexander Neil McDonald (September 30, 1818 – December 7, 1885) was a businessman and political figure in Nova Scotia, Canada. He represented Guysborough County in the Nova Scotia House of Assembly from 1878 to 1882 as a Liberal-Conservative member.

He was born in Sherbrooke, Nova Scotia, the son of Hugh McDonald (of Harris, Isle of Rum, Argyll, Scotland) and Elizabeth E. Archibald, and was educated there. In 1845, he married Rebecca Archibald, the sister of Adams George Archibald. After his first wife's death he married Sarah Blanchard on 30th Oct 1873 in Truro, Guysborough Co., NS. McDonald was Comptroller of Customs, Collector of Excise and Surveyor of Shipping for several years.

The St Mary's Township Book has him as Alexander Neil McDonald. His birth entry was written this way by his father Hugh McDonald, who was the Town Clerk.
