= Benoit Comeau =

Canadian politician

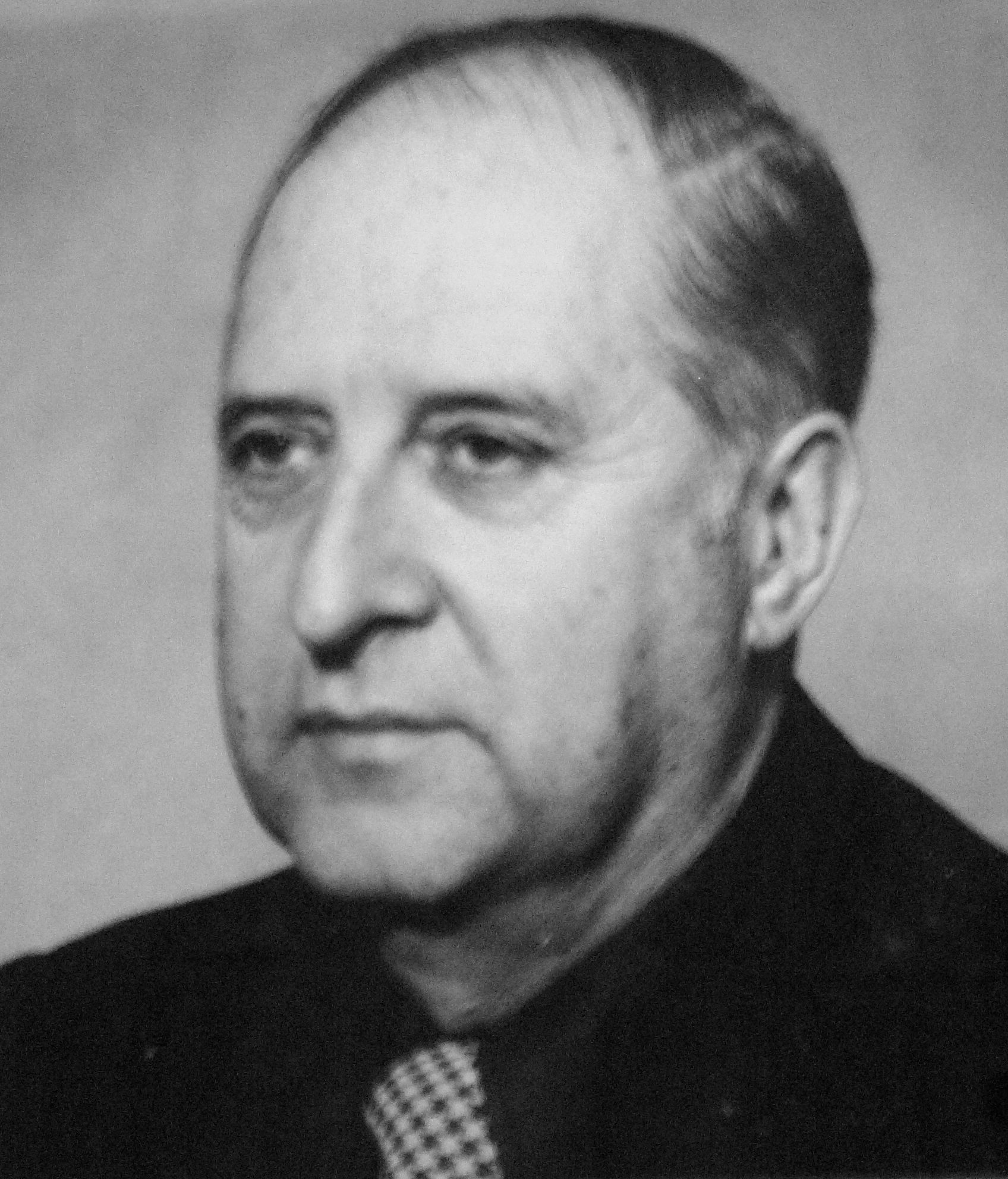
- Comeau, c. 1973

MLA for Clare
- In office 1967–1981
- Preceded by: Hector J. Pothier
- Succeeded by: Chester Melanson

Personal details
- Born: July 23, 1916 Comeauville, Nova Scotia
- Died: December 9, 1995 (aged 79) Digby County, Nova Scotia
- Party: Nova Scotia Liberal Party
- Occupation: mink rancher

Benoit Comeau (July 23, 1916 – December 9, 1995) was a Canadian politician. He represented the electoral district of Clare in the Nova Scotia House of Assembly from 1967 to 1981. He was a member of the Nova Scotia Liberal Party.

== Early life ==
Comeau was born in Comeauville, Nova Scotia; his father was former Nova Scotia MLA and Senator, Joseph William Comeau. Benoit Comeau served in World War II with the Royal Canadian Air Force and was a mink rancher.

== Political career ==
Elected in 1967, Comeau served in the Executive Council of Nova Scotia as Minister of Lands and Forests, Minister of Fisheries, and Minister of Public Works. He did not run for reelection in 1981.

== Death ==
He died on December 9, 1995.

He was married to Marie Antoinette Doucet.
