= William Whitman (politician) =

Canadian politician from Nova Scotia (ca. 1848–1924)

Member of the Nova Scotia House of Assembly for Guysborough County
- In office October 2, 1901 – June 13, 1911

Member of the Legislative Council of Nova Scotia
- In office 1916–1922

Personal details
- Born: 1848 Guysborough, Nova Scotia
- Died: August 28, 1924 Guysborough, Nova Scotia
- Party: Liberal
- Occupation: farmer, trap fisherman, politician

William Whitman (ca. 1848 – August 28, 1924) was a farmer, trap fisherman, and political figure in Nova Scotia, Canada. He represented Guysborough County in the Nova Scotia House of Assembly from 1901 to 1911 as a Liberal member.

Whitman was born around 1848 at Guysborough, Nova Scotia to George Whitman. In 1899, he served as a member of the Lobster Commission under Sir Louis Henry Davies. Whitman was appointed to the Legislative Council of Nova Scotia in 1916 and resigned in 1922. He died in 1924 at Guysborough, Nova Scotia.

He was elected in the 1901 Nova Scotia general election, re-elected in the 1906 Nova Scotia general election, and did not contest the 1911 Nova Scotia general election.
