= Nova Scotia Liberal Party leadership elections =

This page lists the results of leadership elections held by the Nova Scotia Liberal Party. Before 1930 leaders were chosen by the caucus.

== 1930 leadership convention ==
(Held on October 1, 1930)

- Angus Lewis Macdonald 314
- William Duff 110
- John James Kinley 64

(Note: Conflicting accounts exist of Kinley receiving 62 votes)

== Developments 1940–1945 ==
Macdonald resigned in 1940 to enter the federal cabinet and was succeeded as premier and party leader by Alexander S. MacMillan on July 10 of that year. When MacMillan retired in 1945 Macdonald once again resumed the premiership.

== 1945 leadership convention ==
(Held on August 31, 1945)

- Angus Lewis Macdonald acclaimed

Macdonald died on April 13, 1954, and the cabinet chose Harold Connolly to serve as interim leader and premier.

== 1954 leadership convention ==
(Held on September 9, 1954)

First Ballot:

- Harold Connolly 216
- Arthur W. Mackenzie 89
- Henry Hicks 83
- Ronald Fielding 69
- Malcolm Patterson 54
- Hector Hill 36

Second Ballot (Hill eliminated):

- Harold Connolly 238
- Henry Hicks 108
- Arthur W. Mackenzie 106
- Ronald Fielding 56
- Malcolm Patterson 42

Third Ballot (Patterson eliminated):

- Harold Connolly 229
- Henry Hicks 178
- Arthur W. Mackenzie 98
- Ronald Fielding 33

Fourth Ballot (Fielding eliminated):

- Henry Hicks 263
- Harold Connolly 224
- Arthur W. Mackenzie 54

Fifth Ballot (Mackenzie eliminated):

- Henry Hicks 312
- Harold Connolly 229

== 1962 leadership convention ==
(Held on November 3, 1962)

- Earl Urquhart 314
- Gordon S. Cowan 303

== 1965 leadership convention ==
(Held on July 24, 1965)

- Gerald Regan 379
- Robert Matheson 201
- Arthur Yates 8

Colin Chisholm withdrew before balloting.

== 1980 leadership convention ==
(Held on June 8, 1980)

First Ballot:

- Sandy Cameron 340
- Vincent MacLean 244
- Fraser Mooney 192
- Ken MacInnis 138

Second Ballot (MacInnis eliminated):

- Sandy Cameron 412
- Vincent MacLean 317
- Fraser Mooney 187

Third Ballot (Mooney eliminated):

- Sandy Cameron 558
- Vincent MacLean 356

== 1986 leadership convention ==
(Held on February 22, 1986)

- Vincent MacLean 1082
- Jim Cowan 721

== 1992 leadership convention ==
A one member one vote telephone election. The first attempt at voting on June 6, 1992, was canceled when the telephone system crashed during voting and the results were thrown out. The incomplete results of that cancelled ballot were:

- John Savage 1721
- Don Downe 1515
- Ken MacInnis 546
- John Drish 57
- George Hawkins 39

A second, successful, vote was made on June 20, 1992.

First Ballot:

- John Savage 3312
- Don Downe 2832
- Ken MacInnis 755
- John Drish 60
- George Hawkins 39

Second Ballot (Hawkins eliminated. Drish and MacInnis withdrew):

- John Savage 3688
- Don Downe 3311

== 1997 leadership convention ==
(Held on July 12, 1997)

First Ballot:

- Russell MacLellan 4978
- Bernie Boudreau 3235
- Roseanne Skoke 1698
- Bruce Holland 264

Second Ballot (Holland eliminated):

- Russell MacLellan 5539
- Bernie Boudreau 3148
- Roseanne Skoke 1189

== 2002 leadership convention ==
(Held on April 13, 2002)

- Danny Graham 6846
- Francis MacKenzie 3855
- Bruce Graham 835

== 2004 leadership convention ==
(Held on October 23, 2004)

- Francis MacKenzie 5047
- Richie Mann 2389

== 2007 leadership convention ==
(Held April 28, 2007)

First Ballot:

- Stephen McNeil 571
- Diana Whalen 402
- Mike Smith 255
- Kenzie MacKinnon 169

Second Ballot (MacKinnon eliminated and Smith withdrew. Both support Whalen):

- Stephen McNeil 718
- Diana Whalen 650

== 2021 leadership convention ==
(Held February 6, 2021)

The election was conducted on a One Member One Vote basis, weighted so that each electoral district being allocated 100 points, which were distributed proportionally according to each candidate's level of support.

First ballot (points)

- Iain Rankin 2,206.00 (40.11%)
- Labi Kousoulis 2,023.69 (36.79%)
- Randy Delorey 1,270.31 (23.10%)

(Delorey Eliminated)

Second Ballot (points)

- Iain Rankin 2,882.31 (52.41%)
- Labi Kousoulis 2,617.69 (47.59%)

== 2022 leadership convention ==
(Held July 9, 2022)

The election was conducted on a One Member One Vote basis, weighted so that each electoral district being allocated 100 points, which were distributed proportionally according to each candidate's level of support.

First ballot (points)

- Zach Churchill 3,580 (65.09%)
- Angela Simmonds 1,920 (34.91%)

== 2026 leadership convention ==
(Held November 21, 2026)

The election was conducted on a One Member One Vote basis, weighted so that each electoral district being allocated 100 points, which were distributed proportionally according to each candidate's level of support.

First ballot (points)

- Becky Druhan 3,810.94 (68.05%)
- Amanda Mombourquette 1,789.06 (31.95%)

== See also ==
- Leadership convention
- Nova Scotia Liberal Party
