= Richie Mann =

Canadian politician

The Honourable Richie Mann ECNS

MLA for Richmond
- In office 1988–1998
- Preceded by: Greg MacIsaac
- Succeeded by: Michel Samson

Personal details
- Born: 1954 (age 71–72) St. Peter's, Nova Scotia
- Party: Nova Scotia Liberal Party

Richard W. "Richie" Mann (born 1954) is a retired Canadian politician, trades person and current lobbyist/business person in Nova Scotia.

Mann was born and educated in St. Peter's and began a career in 1971 with Swedish pulp and paper company Stora where he worked as an industrial pipefitter/steamfitter from 1971 to 1988 at the pulp and paper mill in Point Tupper. While at Stora, Mann served as a shop steward with Local 972 of the Canadian Paperworkers Union.

Mann holds the Nova Scotia Senior Baseball League record for home runs in a season, set in 1977, for which he was inducted into the NS Baseball Hall of Fame in 1997. Mann is the creator and organizer of the Richie Mann Invitational charity golf tournament, the proceeds of which are donated to the Canadian Breast Cancer Foundation; to date, approximately $780,000 has been raised.

== Political career ==
Mann was elected as a municipal councilor in the 1985 municipal election for the Municipality of Richmond County. During his municipal service from 1985 to 1988, Mann served as Deputy Warden and on various council committees.

In 1988 Mann successfully ran for the Liberal nomination in the riding of Richmond. He was elected in the 1988 provincial election and served as a member of the official opposition where he served in a number of critic responsibilities until 1993. Mann was re-elected in the 1993 provincial election which saw the Liberals receive a majority of seats; Mann's personal election results recorded the largest majority in the history of the riding.

On June 11, 1993, Mann was appointed to the Executive Council of Nova Scotia as Minister of Transportation. He became minister for the new Department of Transportation and Public Works on April 1, 1996. He later served as Minister of Economic Development and Tourism. In addition, he also served as the Government House Leader from 1993 to 1997 and was a member of several committees.

Mann resigned his seat in 1998 in advance of the provincial election. Mann briefly re-entered politics when on July 30, 2004 he announced his candidacy for the leadership of the Nova Scotia Liberal Party. Mann was defeated in his bid for the leadership at the convention that October by Francis MacKenzie.

== Lobbying and business career ==
Mann founded Corporate Strategic Consulting in 1998 as an independent consulting firm specializing in government relations, issues management and research. Mann has also been involved as a lobbyist and investor in the Melford Terminal container terminal project.
