= River Bourgeois, Nova Scotia =

Community in Nova Scotia, Canada

Coordinates: 45°37′57.96″N 60°55′52.34″W

River Bourgeois in Nova Scotia

River Bourgeois is a small community in the Canadian province of Nova Scotia, located in Richmond County on Cape Breton Island. Despite the name, there is a harbour but no river. It is the hometown of former NHL player Mike McPhee.

The talented fiddler Tara Lynne Touesnard was born in River Bourgeois, and is buried there.

River Bourgeois is historically a Catholic Acadian community with a long history of fishing.
