= Alexander F. Cameron =

Canadian politician

Alexander Fisher Cameron

MLA for Guysborough County
- In office 1890–1894
- Preceded by: James A. Fraser; Otto Schwartz Weeks
- Succeeded by: Daniel H. MacKinnon; John Howard Sinclair

Personal details
- Born: October 13, 1860 Aspen, Nova Scotia
- Died: November 24, 1943 (aged 83) Sherbrooke, Nova Scotia
- Party: Liberal-Conservative

Alexander Fisher Cameron (October 13, 1860 – November 24, 1943) was a merchant, lumberman and political figure in Nova Scotia. He represented Guysborough County in the Nova Scotia House of Assembly from 1890 to 1894 as a Liberal-Conservative member.

He was educated at the Commercial College in Halifax. In 1882, he married Edith J. Fraser. He served on the municipal council and was warden for Saint Mary's, Guysborough County. He died due to heart disease in 1943.
