= Havelock Torrey =

Canadian politician (1867–1949)

Havelock L. Torrey (February 13, 1867 – April 1, 1949) was a farmer and political figure in Nova Scotia, Canada. He represented Guysborough in the Nova Scotia House of Assembly from 1937 to 1945 as a Liberal member. His surname also appears as Tory in some sources.

He was born in Guysborough, Nova Scotia, the son of James A. Torrey and Mary Eliza McGregor. Torrey married Maria DesBarres. He was also superintendent of projects for a construction company. Torrey served on the county council for Guysborough County, also serving as warden. He died in Halifax on April 1, 1949, at the age of 82.
