= James A. Fraser =

Canadian politician

James A. Fraser (27 June 1841 – 14 January 1930) was a gold miner and political figure in Nova Scotia, Canada. He represented Guysborough County in the Nova Scotia House of Assembly from 1882 to 1890 as a Liberal member.

He was born in Brookville, Pictou County, Nova Scotia, the son of Donald Fraser and Sophia Fraser, of Scottish descent. In 1871, Fraser married Charlotte M. Fisher. Fraser served as a member of the municipal council for St. Mary's district before being elected to the provincial assembly. He was also editor for the Eastern Chronicle.
