= Arthur W. MacKenzie =

Canadian politician

Arthur Whittier MacKenzie (June 15, 1898 – 1986) was an army officer and political figure in Nova Scotia, Canada. He represented Guysborough in the Nova Scotia House of Assembly from 1945 to 1956 as a Liberal member.

Mackenzie was born at Nine Mile River, Hants County, Nova Scotia, the son of Benjamin MacKenzie and Minnie Scott. In 1926, he married Alice Fisher, with whom he had a daughter. MacKenzie married Jean Maclean (Horton) in 1935 following the death of his first wife. He became step-father to her son, and the couple went on to have another son. After being widowed a second time, MacKenzie married Geneve Forbes (Glennie), a widow with two children.

MacKenzie joined the Army during World War I while still a minor. (See "Old Enough to Fight: Canada's Boy Soldiers During the First World War" By Dan Black and John Boileau). He also served in World War II and became a Lieutenant-Colonel.

After the war MacKenzie served in the province's Executive Council as Minister of Agriculture and Minister of Lands and Forests from 1945 to 1954, and Minister of Highways and Public Works from 1954 to 1956. He was an unsuccessful candidate for a seat in the provincial assembly in 1956.
