= Howard Amos Rice =

Canadian politician (1872–1959)

Howard Amos Rice (May 5, 1872 – February 2, 1959) was a merchant and political figure in Nova Scotia, Canada. He represented Guysborough County in the Nova Scotia House of Assembly from 1925 to 1928 as a Liberal-Conservative member.

He was born at Little Bras d'Or, Nova Scotia, the son of Abner Rice and Augusta Moffatt. In 1898, he married Mary Ida Blenkhorn. Rice was mayor of Canso from 1910 to 1924. He served as cable censor at Canso during World War I. Rice was an unsuccessful candidate for a seat in the House of Commons in 1930. Rice died at Canso on February 2, 1959.
