= William Merrill Whitman =

American lawyer

William Merrill Whitman (January 7, 1911 – November 24, 1993) was born in Omaha, Nebraska and graduated from the Nebraska State Teachers College in Wayne, Nebraska in 1930 with an A.B. degree. From 1930 to 1932, Whitman was a history teacher at Chadron High School in Nebraska. In 1932, Whitman attended the Northwestern University School of Law in Chicago, Illinois. He graduated cum laude from the University of Nebraska College of Law with an L.L.B. degree in 1935. He was admitted to the Nebraska bar that same year.

From 1935 to 1939, Whitman was the legal editor for the West Publishing Company in St. Paul, Minnesota. Whitman began his long relationship (ending in 1972) with the Panama Canal the following year when he was admitted to the Panama Canal Zone Bar and began undertaking legal work for the Panama Railway, the Panama Canal Company, and the government of the Panama Canal Zone.

From 1940 to 1942, Whitman was an associate attorney for the Canal Zone's General Counsel. After his admission to the bar of the Supreme Court of the United States in 1943, he served as the assistant general counsel for the Canal Zone (beginning in 1943) until 1948. Whitman served as the canal's attorney and legal advisor in Washington, D.C., from 1948 to 1952. During that period, Whitman undertook post-graduate study at Georgetown University in Washington, D.C., and served (in 1951) as assistant chief of the Washington, D.C., office and assistant general purchasing officer for the Panama Canal Company.

From 1952 to 1972, Whitman served as secretary and officer in Washington for the Panama Canal Company, assistant to the governor of the Canal Zone, and representative in Washington for the Canal Zone Government.

From 1958 to 1963, Whitman was a member of the Advisory Committee for Revision of Canal Code. In 1970, he was a member of the Atlantic-Pacific Interoceanic Canal Study Commission. From 1972 to 1976, Whitman was a consultant to the Panama Canal Company and from 1977 to 1982 he was a consultant to the Merchant Marine and Fisheries Committee of the United States House of Representatives.
