= Richie Hubbard =

Canadian politician

Member of the Nova Scotia House of Assembly for Yarmouth
- In office 1993–1998
- Preceded by: Leroy Legere
- Succeeded by: John Deveau

Personal details
- Born: June 8, 1932 Yarmouth, Nova Scotia
- Died: May 3, 2011 (age 78)
- Party: Liberal
- Occupation: Air force, recreational director, politician

Walter "Richard" Hubbard (June 8, 1932 – May 3, 2011) was a political figure in Nova Scotia, Canada. He represented Yarmouth in the Nova Scotia House of Assembly from 1993 to 1998 as a Liberal member.

== Before politics ==
Hubbard was born in Yarmouth, the son of Eli and Ann Celina (Thibeault) Hubbard. He served in the Royal Canadian Air Force for 24 years. After that he became the town's first recreation director. He was active in the Roman Catholic church and the Knights of Columbus where he was a Fourth Degree Knight.
