= Simon Osborn Giffin =

Canadian politician (1870–1935)

Simon Osborn Giffin (June 8, 1870 – February 11, 1935) was a merchant and political figure in Nova Scotia, Canada. He represented Guysborough County in the Nova Scotia House of Assembly from 1925 to 1928, as a Liberal-Conservative member.

He was born at East Side, Isaac's Harbour, Guysborough County, Nova Scotia, the son of Samuel R. Giffin and Harriet Jane Reid. In 1894, Giffin married Stella Lee McMillan. He died in Guysborough at the age of 64.
