= Daniel H. MacKinnon =

Canadian politician

Daniel H. MacKinnon (April 14, 1866 – unknown) was a lawyer and political figure in Nova Scotia, Canada. He represented Guysborough County in the Nova Scotia House of Assembly from 1894 to 1897 as a Liberal member.

He was born in Lake Ainslie, Inverness County, Nova Scotia, the son of Neil MacKinnon and Mary McLeod, both of Scottish descent. He was educated there and at the Pictou Academy. In 1891, he married Christiana McPherson. MacKinnon was also a notary public and Crown Prosecutor for Guysborough County.
