= Kings (Nova Scotia provincial electoral district) =

Former provincial electoral district in Nova Scotia, Canada

Nova Scotia electoral district

Defunct provincial electoral district
- Legislature: Nova Scotia House of Assembly
- District created: 1867
- District abolished: 1956
- Last contested: 1953

Kings was a provincial electoral district in Nova Scotia, Canada, that elected two members to the Nova Scotia House of Assembly at the time of its dissolution. It existed from 1867 until 1956, when Kings County was divided into the three electoral districts of Kings North, Kings South, and Kings West. Apart from a brief period between 1933 and 1945, during which one member was elected, Kings always elected two members to the Legislature.

== Members of the Legislative Assembly ==
Kings elected the following members to the legislature:

Legislature	Years	Member	Party	Member	Party
45th	1953–1956	Edward Haliburton	Progressive Conservative	George Arthur Boggs	Progressive Conservative
44th	1949—1953	David Durell Sutton	Liberal	William H. Pipe	Liberal
43rd	1945–1949	David Durell Sutton	Liberal	John Alexander McDonald	Liberal
42nd	1941–1945	seat declared vacant		John Alexander McDonald	Liberal
41st	1937—1941	seat declared vacant		John Alexander McDonald	Liberal
40th	1933–1937	seat declared vacant		John Alexander McDonald	Liberal
39th	1928–1933	George C. Nowlan	Liberal-Conservative	Reginald Tucker Caldwell	Liberal-Conservative
38th	1925–1928	George C. Nowlan	Liberal-Conservative	Reginald Tucker Caldwell	Liberal-Conservative
37th	1923–1925	James Sealy	Liberal	John Alexander McDonald	Liberal
37th	1920–1923	Harry H. Wickwire	Liberal	John Alexander McDonald	Liberal
36th	1916–1920	Harry H. Wickwire	Liberal	James Everett Kinsman	Liberal-Conservative
35th	1911–1916	Harry H. Wickwire	Liberal	Archibald Menzies Covert	Liberal
34th	1911*	Harry H. Wickwire	Liberal	Charles Alexander Campbell	Unity Reform Party
34th	1906–1910	Brenton Dodge	Liberal	Charles Alexander Campbell	Unity Reform Party
33rd	1901–1906	Brenton Dodge	Liberal	Harry H. Wickwire	Liberal
32nd	1897–1901	Brenton Dodge	Liberal	Harry H. Wickwire	Liberal
31st	1894–1897	Brenton Dodge	Liberal	Harry H. Wickwire	Liberal
30th	1890–1894	Alfred Parker Welton	Liberal	Barclay Webster	Liberal-Conservative
29th	1886–1890	Leander Rand	Liberal	William C. Bill	Liberal-Conservative
28th	1882–1886	Thomas R. Harris	Liberal-Conservative	Thomas Lewis Dodge	Liberal
27th	1878–1882	James Stainforth MacDonald	Liberal-Conservative	William C. Bill	Liberal-Conservative
26th	1874–1878	Douglas Benjamin Woodworth	Liberal-Conservative	John Burton North	Independent
25th	1871–1874	Douglas Benjamin Woodworth	Liberal-Conservative	Daniel Charles Moore	Liberal-Conservative
24th	1867–1871	Edward L. Brown	Anti-Confederation Party	David M. Dickie	Anti-Confederation Party

^{*NB} Dodge died in office on December 30, 1910. Wickwire was elected to replace him in a by-election on January 31, 1911. Wickwire was then re-elected in the Nova Scotia general election held on June 14, 1911.

== Election results ==
=== 1953 ===
1953 Nova Scotia general election
Party	Candidate	Votes	%	Elected
Progressive Conservative	Edward Haliburton	7,642	25.98%	✓
Progressive Conservative	George Arthur Boggs	7,481	25.43%	✓
Liberal	David Russell Sutton	7,245	24.63%	
Liberal	William H. Pipe	7,047	23.96%	
Total		29,415	–	
Source(s) Source: Nova Scotia Legislature (2024). "Electoral History for Kings County" (PDF). nslegislature.ca. Nova Scotia Legislature (1953). Returns of the General Election for the House of Assembly (PDF) (Report). Queen's Printer. Archived from the original (PDF) on September 10, 2018.

=== 1949 ===
1949 Nova Scotia general election
Party	Candidate	Votes	%	Elected
Liberal	William H. Pipe	7,369	25.51%	✓
Liberal	David Russell Sutton	7,322	25.34%	✓
Progressive Conservative	Edward Haliburton	7,138	24.71%	
Progressive Conservative	Hiram Thomas	7,061	24.44%	
Total		28,890	–	
Source(s) Source: Nova Scotia Legislature (2024). "Electoral History for Kings County" (PDF). nslegislature.ca. Nova Scotia Legislature (1949). Returns of the General Election for the House of Assembly (PDF) (Report). Queen's Printer. Archived from the original (PDF) on September 10, 2018.

=== 1945 ===
1945 Nova Scotia general election
Party	Candidate	Votes	%	Elected
Liberal	David Russell Sutton	7,027	59.66%	✓
Progressive Conservative	William Lawrence Chisholm	4,751	40.34%	
Total		11,778	–	
Source(s) Source: Nova Scotia Legislature (2024). "Electoral History for Kings County" (PDF). nslegislature.ca. Nova Scotia Legislature (1945). Returns of the General Election for the House of Assembly (PDF) (Report). Queen's Printer. Archived from the original (PDF) on September 10, 2018.

=== 1941 ===
1941 Nova Scotia general election
Party	Candidate	Votes	%	Elected
Liberal	John Alexander McDonald	6,654	62.58%	✓
Progressive Conservative	Raymond Crosby	3,978	37.42%	
Total		10,632	–	
Source(s) Source: Nova Scotia Legislature (2024). "Electoral History for Kings County" (PDF). nslegislature.ca. Nova Scotia Legislature (1941). Returns of the General Election for the House of Assembly (PDF) (Report). Queen's Printer. Archived from the original (PDF) on February 8, 2024.

=== 1937 ===
1937 Nova Scotia general election
Party	Candidate	Votes	%	Elected
Liberal	John Alexander McDonald	7,470	56.33%	✓
Progressive Conservative	George Nowlan	5,790	43.67%	
Total		13,260	–	
Source(s) Source: Nova Scotia Legislature (2024). "Electoral History for Kings County" (PDF). nslegislature.ca. Nova Scotia Legislature (1937). Returns of the General Election for the House of Assembly (PDF) (Report). Queen's Printer. Archived from the original (PDF) on March 1, 2019.

=== 1933 ===
1933 Nova Scotia general election
Party	Candidate	Votes	%	Elected
Liberal	John Alexander McDonald	6,700	52.35%	✓
Liberal-Conservative	George Nowlan	6,098	47.65%	
Total		12,798	–	
Source(s) Source: Nova Scotia Legislature (2024). "Electoral History for Kings County" (PDF). nslegislature.ca. Nova Scotia Legislature (1933). Returns of the General Election for the House of Assembly (PDF) (Report). Queen's Printer. Archived from the original (PDF) on March 1, 2019.

=== 1928 ===
1928 Nova Scotia general election
Party	Candidate	Votes	%	Elected
Liberal-Conservative	Reginald Tucker Caldwell	5,540	26.89%	✓
Liberal-Conservative	George Nowlan	5,452	26.46%	✓
Liberal	James F. Durno	5,003	24.28%	
Liberal	Frederick J. Porter	4,610	22.37%	
Total		20,605	–	
Source(s) Source: Nova Scotia Legislature (2024). "Electoral History for Kings County" (PDF). nslegislature.ca.

=== 1925 ===
1925 Nova Scotia general election
Party	Candidate	Votes	%	Elected
Liberal-Conservative	George Nowlan	5,520	26.95%	✓
Liberal-Conservative	Reginald Tucker Caldwell	5,455	26.63%	✓
Liberal	John Alexander McDonald	4,963	24.23%	
Liberal	Allison H. Borden	4,543	22.18%	
Total		20,481	–	
Source(s) Source: Nova Scotia Legislature (2024). "Electoral History for Kings County" (PDF). nslegislature.ca.

=== 1923 ===
Nova Scotia provincial by-election, 1923-01-16 Death of Harry H. Wickwire
Party	Candidate	Votes	%	Elected
Liberal	James Sealy	acclaimed	N/A	✓
Total			–	
Source(s) Source: Nova Scotia Legislature (2024). "Electoral History for Kings County" (PDF). nslegislature.ca.

=== 1920 ===
1920 Nova Scotia general election
Party	Candidate	Votes	%	Elected
Liberal	Harry H. Wickwire	4,917	29.48%	✓
Liberal	John Alexander McDonald	4,705	28.21%	✓
Liberal-Conservative	James Everett Kinsman	3,622	21.71%	
Liberal-Conservative	C. R. Bill	3,437	20.60%	
Total		16,681	–	
Source(s) Source: Nova Scotia Legislature (2024). "Electoral History for Kings County" (PDF). nslegislature.ca.

=== 1916 ===
1916 Nova Scotia general election
Party	Candidate	Votes	%	Elected
Liberal	Harry H. Wickwire	2,499	26.44%	✓
Liberal-Conservative	James Everett Kinsman	2,421	25.62%	✓
Liberal	Charles Alexander Campbell	2,318	24.53%	
Liberal-Conservative	Joseph D. Spidell	2,212	23.41%	
Total		9,450	–	
Source(s) Source: Nova Scotia Legislature (2024). "Electoral History for Kings County" (PDF). nslegislature.ca.

=== 1911 ===
1911 Nova Scotia general election
Party	Candidate	Votes	%	Elected
Liberal	Harry H. Wickwire	2,413	27.12%	✓
Liberal	Archibald Menzies Covert	2,156	24.24%	✓
Moral Reform	N. W. Eaton	1,893	21.28%	
Liberal-Conservative	S. C. Parker	1,599	17.97%	
Moral Reform	Charles Alexander Campbell	835	9.39%	
Total		8,896	–	
Source(s) Source: Nova Scotia Legislature (2024). "Electoral History for Kings County" (PDF). nslegislature.ca.

=== 1911 ===
Nova Scotia provincial by-election, 1911-01-31
Party	Candidate	Votes	%	Elected
Liberal	Harry H. Wickwire	acclaimed	N/A	✓
Total			–	
Source(s) Source: Nova Scotia Legislature (2024). "Electoral History for Kings County" (PDF). nslegislature.ca.

=== 1906 ===
1906 Nova Scotia general election
Party	Candidate	Votes	%	Elected
Liberal	Brenton Dodge	2,152	25.83%	✓
Unity Reform	Charles Alexander Campbell	2,148	25.78%	✓
Liberal	Harry H. Wickwire	2,056	24.67%	
Liberal-Conservative	E. W. Sawyer	1,977	23.72%	
Total		8,333	–	
Source(s) Source: Nova Scotia Legislature (2024). "Electoral History for Kings County" (PDF). nslegislature.ca.

=== 1901 ===
1901 Nova Scotia general election
Party	Candidate	Votes	%	Elected
Liberal	Brenton Dodge	2,225	33.97%	✓
Liberal	Harry H. Wickwire	2,122	32.40%	✓
Liberal-Conservative	J. W. Ryan	1,116	17.04%	
Liberal-Conservative	Peter Innis	1,087	16.60%	
Total		6,550	–	
Source(s) Source: Nova Scotia Legislature (2024). "Electoral History for Kings County" (PDF). nslegislature.ca.

=== 1897 ===
1897 Nova Scotia general election
Party	Candidate	Votes	%	Elected
Liberal	Brenton Dodge	2,354	33.08%	✓
Liberal	Harry H. Wickwire	2,195	30.85%	✓
Liberal-Conservative	Peter Innis	1,460	20.52%	
Liberal-Conservative	Leander Rand	1,107	15.56%	
Total		7,116	–	
Source(s) Source: Nova Scotia Legislature (2024). "Electoral History for Kings County" (PDF). nslegislature.ca.

=== 1894 ===
1894 Nova Scotia general election
Party	Candidate	Votes	%	Elected
Liberal	Brenton Dodge	2,227	31.00%	✓
Liberal	Harry H. Wickwire	2,081	28.97%	✓
Liberal-Conservative	Barclay Webster	1,580	21.99%	
Liberal-Conservative	R. M. Rand	1,296	18.04%	
Total		7,184	–	
Source(s) Source: Nova Scotia Legislature (2024). "Electoral History for Kings County" (PDF). nslegislature.ca.

=== 1890 ===
1890 Nova Scotia general election
Party	Candidate	Votes	%	Elected
Liberal-Conservative	Barclay Webster	1,741	27.82%	✓
Liberal	Alfred Parker Welton	1,572	25.12%	✓
Liberal-Conservative	Thomas R. Harris	1,540	24.61%	
Liberal	J. E. Starr	1,405	22.45%	
Total		6,258	–	
Source(s) Source: Nova Scotia Legislature (2024). "Electoral History for Kings County" (PDF). nslegislature.ca.

=== 1886 ===
1886 Nova Scotia general election
Party	Candidate	Votes	%	Elected
Liberal	Leander Rand	1,635	26.54%	✓
Liberal-Conservative	William C. Bill	1,560	25.32%	✓
Liberal	Alfred Parker Welton	1,535	24.92%	
Liberal-Conservative	Thomas R. Harris	1,430	23.21%	
Total		6,160	–	
Source(s) Source: Nova Scotia Legislature (2024). "Electoral History for Kings County" (PDF). nslegislature.ca.

=== 1882 ===
1882 Nova Scotia general election
Party	Candidate	Votes	%	Elected
Liberal	Thomas Lewis Dodge	1,437	25.82%	✓
Liberal-Conservative	Thomas R. Harris	1,345	24.17%	✓
Liberal	William C. Bill	1,267	22.77%	
Liberal	C. B. Hickey	1,198	21.53%	
Independent	James Lyons	318	5.71%	
Total		5,565	–	
Source(s) Source: Nova Scotia Legislature (2024). "Electoral History for Kings County" (PDF). nslegislature.ca.

=== 1878 ===
1878 Nova Scotia general election
Party	Candidate	Votes	%	Elected
Liberal-Conservative	William C. Bill	1,601	28.16%	✓
Liberal-Conservative	James S. MacDonald	1,527	26.86%	✓
Liberal	G. W. Fisher	1,414	24.87%	
Liberal	E. A. Forsyth	1,143	20.11%	
Total		5,685	–	
Source(s) Source: Nova Scotia Legislature (2024). "Electoral History for Kings County" (PDF). nslegislature.ca.

=== 1874 ===
1874 Nova Scotia general election
Party	Candidate	Votes	%	Elected
Liberal-Conservative	Douglas Benjamin Woodworth	1,260	28.16%	✓
Independent	John B. North	1,171	26.17%	✓
Liberal	Daniel Charles Moore	1,027	22.95%	
Liberal	Henry Shaw	1,016	22.71%	
Total		4,474	–	
Source(s) Source: Nova Scotia Legislature (2024). "Electoral History for Kings County" (PDF). nslegislature.ca.

=== 1871 ===
1871 Nova Scotia general election
Party	Candidate	Votes	%	Elected
Liberal-Conservative	Daniel Charles Moore	1,094	29.80%	✓
Liberal-Conservative	Douglas Benjamin Woodworth	984	26.80%	✓
Liberal	Edward L. Brown	797	21.71%	
Liberal	David M. Dickie	796	21.68%	
Total		3,671	–	
Source(s) Source: Nova Scotia Legislature (2024). "Electoral History for Kings County" (PDF). nslegislature.ca.

=== 1867 ===
1867 Nova Scotia general election
Party	Candidate	Votes	%	Elected
Anti-Confederation	David M. Dickie	1,393	32.87%	✓
Anti-Confederation	Edward L. Brown	1,280	30.20%	✓
Confederation	T. W. Harris	904	21.33%	
Confederation	R. C. Foster	661	15.60%	
Total		4,238	–	
Source(s) Source: Nova Scotia Legislature (2024). "Electoral History for Kings County" (PDF). nslegislature.ca.

== See also ==
- List of Nova Scotia provincial electoral districts
- Canadian provincial electoral districts
