= 44th General Assembly of Nova Scotia =

The 44th General Assembly of Nova Scotia represented Nova Scotia between March 21, 1950, and April 14, 1953.

== Division of seats ==
There were 37 members of the General Assembly elected in the 1949 Nova Scotia general election.

Leader	Party	# of Seats
Robert L. Stanfield	Conservative	8
Angus L. Macdonald	Liberal	27
Russell Cunningham	CCF	2
Total		37

== List of members ==
Riding	Name	Party	First elected / previously elected	Position
Annapolis County	Henry Davies Hicks	Liberal	1945	Minister of Education
Antigonish	Colin H. Chisholm	Liberal	1949	
Cape Breton South	John Smith MacIvor	Liberal	1945	
Cape Breton Centre	Michael McDonald	CCF	1945	
Cape Breton North	Alexander O'Handley	Liberal	1925, (Note: Cape Breton East (First elected as a Conservative)) 1941	
Cape Breton East	Russell Cunningham	CCF	1945	
Cape Breton West	Malcolm A. Patterson	Liberal	1937	Attorney general
Clare	Desire J. Comeau	Progressive Conservative	1949	
Colchester	Robert L. Stanfield	Progressive Conservative	1949	
Colchester	G. I. Smith	Progressive Conservative	1949	
Cumberland East	Martin J. Kaufman	Liberal	1945	
Cumberland West	Thomas A. Giles	Progressive Conservative	1949	
Cumberland Centre	Archibald J. Mason	Liberal	1949	
Digby	E. Keith Potter	Progressive Conservative	1949	
Guysborough	Arthur Whittier MacKenzie	Liberal	1945	
Halifax South	Angus L.MacDonald	Liberal	1933, 1945	Premier
Halifax Centre	James Edward Rutledge	Liberal	1939	
Halifax North	Harold Connolly	Liberal	1936	
Halifax East	Geoffrey W. Stevens	Liberal	1933	
Halifax West	Ronald Manning Fielding	Liberal	1941	
Hants East	Ernest M. Ettinger	Progressive Conservative	1949	
Hants West	George B. Cole	Liberal	1949	
Hants West	George H. Wilson (1950)	Progressive Conservative	1950	
Inverness	Alexander H. McKinnon	Liberal	1940	
Inverness	Roderick MacLean	Liberal	1949	
Kings	William H. Pipe	Liberal	1949	
Kings	David Durell Sutton	Liberal	1945	
Lunenburg	Gordon E. Romkey	Liberal	1928	speaker
Lunenburg	Arthur L. Thurlow	Liberal	1949	
Pictou East	John W. MacDonald	Liberal	1949	
Pictou West	Stewart W. Proudfoot	Liberal	1949	
Pictou Centre	Alfred B. DeWolfe	Liberal	1945	
Queens	Merrill D. Rawding	Liberal	1945	
Richmond	Lauchlin Daniel Currie	Liberal	1933, (Note: Cape Breton East) 1941	
Richmond	Earle W. Urquhart (1949)	Liberal	1949	
Shelburne	Wilfred Tennyson Dauphinee	Liberal	1941	
Victoria	Carleton L. MacMillan	Liberal	1949	
Yarmouth	William H. Brown	Progressive Conservative	1949	
Yarmouth	Donald J. Fraser	Liberal	1949	

== Former members of the 44th General Assembly ==
Name	Party	Electoral District	Cause of departure	Succeeded by	Elected
Lauchlin Daniel Currie	Liberal	Richmond	named judge	Earle W. Urquhart, Liberal	December 20, 1949
George B. Cole	Liberal	Hants West	election appealed	George H. Wilson, PC	November 27, 1950

== Notes ==
Preceded by 43rd General Assembly of Nova Scotia	General Assemblies of Nova Scotia; 1949–1953	Succeeded by 45th General Assembly of Nova Scotia
