= 45th General Assembly of Nova Scotia =

The 45th General Assembly of Nova Scotia represented Nova Scotia between February 24, 1954, and September 10, 1956.

== Division of seats ==
There were 37 members of the General Assembly, elected in the 1953 Nova Scotia general election.

Leader	Party	# of Seats
Angus L. Macdonald	Liberal	22
Robert L. Stanfield	Progressive Conservative	13
Russell Cunningham	CCF	2
Total		37

== List of members ==
Riding	Name	Party	First elected / previously elected	Position
Annapolis County	Henry Davies Hicks	Liberal	1945	Minister of Education; Premier (1954)
Antigonish	Colin H. Chisholm	Liberal	1949	
Cape Breton South	John Smith MacIvor	Liberal	1945	speaker
Cape Breton Centre	Michael MacDonald	CCF	1945	
Cape Breton North	Alexander O'Handley	Liberal	1925, (Note: Cape Breton East (First elected as a Conservative)) 1941	
Cape Breton East	Russell Cunningham	CCF	1945	
Cape Breton West	Malcolm A. Patterson	Liberal	1937	Attorney general
Clare	Pierre E. Belliveau	Liberal	1953	
Colchester	Robert L. Stanfield	Progressive Conservative	1949	
Colchester	G. I. Smith	Progressive Conservative	1949	
Cumberland East	James A. Langille	Progressive Conservative	1953	
Cumberland West	Allison T. Smith	Liberal	1953	
Cumberland Centre	Stephen T. Pyke	Progressive Conservative	1953	
Digby	Victor George Cardoza	Liberal	1953	
Guysborough	Arthur Whittier MacKenzie	Liberal	1945	
Halifax South	Angus L. MacDonald	Liberal	1933, 1945	Premier
Halifax South	Richard A.Donahoe (1954)	Progressive Conservative	1954	
Halifax Centre	James Edward Rutledge	Liberal	1939	
Halifax North	Harold Connolly	Liberal	1936	Minister of Public Health acting Premier (1954)
Halifax East	Geoffrey W. Stevens	Liberal	1933	
Halifax West	Ronald Manning Fielding	Liberal	1941	
Hants East	Alfred E. Reid	Liberal	1953	
Hants West	George H. Wilson	Progressive Conservative	1950	
Inverness	Alexander H. McKinnon	Liberal	1940	
Inverness	Roderick MacLean	Liberal	1949	
Inverness	Joseph Clyde Nunn (1954)	Liberal	1954	
Kings	Edward Haliburton	Progressive Conservative	1953	
Kings	George Arthur Boggs	Progressive Conservative	1953	
Lunenburg	Harley J. Spence	Progressive Conservative	1953	
Lunenburg	R. Clifford Levy	Progressive Conservative	1953	
Pictou East	John W. MacDonald	Liberal	1949	
Pictou West	Stewart W. Proudfoot	Liberal	1949	
Pictou Centre	Alfred B. DeWolfe	Liberal	1945	
Queens	W. S. Kennedy Jones	Progressive Conservative	1953	
Richmond	Earl Wallace Urquhart	Liberal	1949	
Shelburne	Wilfred Tennyson Dauphinee	Liberal	1941	
Victoria	Carleton L. MacMillan	Liberal	1949	
Yarmouth	William H. Brown	Progressive Conservative	1949	
Yarmouth	Raymond Z. Bourque	Progressive Conservative	1953	

== Former members of the 45th General Assembly ==
Name	Party	Electoral District	Cause of departure	Succeeded by	Elected
Angus L. MacDonald	Liberal	Halifax South	died	Richard A.Donahoe, PC	November 14, 1954
Alexander H. McKinnon	Liberal	Inverness	named judge	Joseph Clyde Nunn, Liberal	November 14, 1954

== Notes ==
Preceded by 44th General Assembly of Nova Scotia	General Assemblies of Nova Scotia; 1953–1956	Succeeded by 46th General Assembly of Nova Scotia
