= George E. Hagen =

Canadian politician

MLA for Halifax West
- In office 1933–1940
- Preceded by: new riding
- Succeeded by: Ronald Manning Fielding

Personal details
- Born: July 1, 1878 Hunt's Point, Nova Scotia
- Died: November 11, 1940 (aged 62) Halifax, Nova Scotia
- Party: Nova Scotia Liberal Party

George E. Hagen (July 1, 1878 – November 11, 1940) was a Canadian politician. He represented the electoral district of Halifax West in the Nova Scotia House of Assembly from 1933 to 1940. He was a member of the Nova Scotia Liberal Party.

Born in 1878 at Hunt's Point, Nova Scotia, Hagen was a plumbing and heating contractor by career. He married Della Dobson. He served as president of the Nova Scotia Liberal Party. Hagen entered provincial politics in the 1933 election, winning the Halifax West riding. He was re-elected in 1937. He served in the Executive Council of Nova Scotia as Minister of Industry. In July 1940, Hagen announced he was resigning from politics, but later changed his mind and was re-nominated as the Liberal candidate for Halifax West. He won the byelection on October 28 by acclamation. Hagen died in office on November 11, 1940.
