= 1890 Nova Scotia general election =

Canadian provincial election

- May 14–21, 1890

38 seats of the Nova Scotia House of Assembly 20 seats needed for a majority
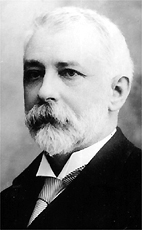
	First party	Second party
		Con
Leader	William Stevens Fielding	William MacKay
Party	Liberal	Liberal-Conservative
Leader since	1884	1887
Leader's seat	Halifax	Cape Breton (Lost re-election)
Last election	29	8
Seats won	28	10
Seat change	▼1	▲2
Popular vote	69,307	63,720
Percentage	50.84%	46.74%
Swing	▼4.04pp	▲2.61pp
Premier before election
William Stevens Fielding
Liberal
Premier after election
William Stevens Fielding
Liberal

The 1890 Nova Scotia general election was held from 14 May to 21 May 1890 to elect members of the 30th House of Assembly of the province of Nova Scotia, Canada. It was won by the Liberal party.

== Results ==
=== Results by party ===
↓
28	10
Liberal	Liberal-Conservative

Official results
Party	Party leader	# of candidates	Seats				Popular vote		
Party	Party leader	# of candidates	1886	Dissolution	Elected	Change	#	%	Change (pp)
Liberal	William Stevens Fielding	40	29	29	28	-1	69,307	50.84%	-4.04%
Liberal-Conservative	William MacKay	38	8	8	10	+2	63,720	46.74%	+2.61%
Independent/Other		2	1	1	0	-1	3,302	2.42%	+1.43%
Vacant				0					
Total valid votes							136,329	100.00%	–
Blank and invalid ballots							0	0.00%	–
Total		80	38	38	38	–	136,329	100.00%	–

Popular vote
Liberal	50.84%
Liberal-Conservative	46.74%
Independent/Other	2.42%

Seats summary
Liberal	73.68%
Liberal-Conservative	26.32%

== Retiring incumbents ==
Liberal

- Joseph H. Cook, Queens
- Jeffrey McColl, Pictou
- John S. McNeill, Digby
- Leander Rand, Kings
- Henri M. Robicheau, Digby

Liberal-Conservative

- Frank Andrews, Annapolis
- William C. Bill, Kings
- Charles H. Munro, Pictou

== Nominated candidates ==
1890 Nova Scotia Provincial Election

Legend
bold denotes party leader
† denotes an incumbent who is not running for re-election or was defeated in nomination contest

=== Valley ===
Electoral district	Candidates			Incumbent
Electoral district	Liberal	Liberal-Conservative	Independent/Other	Incumbent
Annapolis	James Wilberforce Longley; 1,884; 27.33%	C. S. Harrington; 1,622; 23.53%		James Wilberforce Longley
Annapolis	Harris H. Chute; 1,844; 26.75%	B. Starratt; 1,543; 22.39%		Frank Andrews†
Digby	Ambroise-Hilaire Comeau; 1,207; 26.57%	Robert G. Munroe; 708; 15.59%		Henri M. Robicheau†
Digby	William German; 437; 9.62%	Robert G. Munroe; 708; 15.59%		Henri M. Robicheau†
Digby	Eliakim Tupper; 1,179; 25.96%	Daniel LeBlanc; 665; 14.64%		John S. McNeill†
Digby	Edward Hogan; 346; 7.63%	Daniel LeBlanc; 665; 14.64%		John S. McNeill†
Hants	Allen Haley; 1,661; 25.28%	Adam McDougall; 1,660; 25.26%		Allen Haley
Hants	Archibald Frame; 1,552; 23.62%	Thomas Barlow Smith; 1,698; 25.84%		Archibald Frame
Kings	Alfred P. Welton; 1,572; 25.12%	Thomas R. Harris; 1,540; 24.61%		Leander Rand†
Kings	J. E. Starr; 1,405; 22.45%	Barclay Webster; 1,741; 27.82%		William C. Bill†

=== South Shore ===
Electoral district	Candidates			Incumbent
Electoral district	Liberal	Liberal-Conservative	Independent/Other	Incumbent
Lunenburg	John Drew Sperry; 2,091; 26.12%	James A. McLean; 1,960; 24.48%		John Drew Sperry
Lunenburg	Charles Edward Church; 2,033; 25.39%	Charles A. Smith; 1,922; 24.01%		Charles Edward Church
Queens	Richard Hunt; 897; 28.12%	Leander Ford; 722; 22.63%		Joseph H. Cook†
Queens	Albert M. Hemeon; 887; 27.81%	C. A. Bowlley; 684; 21.44%		Albert M. Hemeon
Shelburne	Thomas Johnston; 1,061; 25.85%	Alfred K. Smith; 951; 23.17%		Thomas Johnston
Shelburne	William F. MacCoy; 1,042; 25.38%	Charles Cahan; 1,051; 25.60%		William F. MacCoy
Yarmouth	William Law; 1,487; 31.48%	M. D'Entremont; 962; 20.37%		William Law
Yarmouth	Albert Gayton; 1,473; 31.19%	Jacob Bingay; 801; 16.96%		Albert Gayton

=== Fundy-Northeast ===
Electoral district	Candidates			Incumbent
Electoral district	Liberal	Liberal-Conservative	Independent/Other	Incumbent
Colchester	Frederick Andrew Laurence; 1,904; 25.71%	Israel Longworth; 1,842; 24.87%		Frederick Andrew Laurence
Colchester	George Clarke; 1,868; 25.22%	William Albert Patterson; 1,793; 24.21%		George Clarke
Cumberland	Thomas Reuben Black; 2,537; 24.58%	George W. Forrest; 2,818; 27.30%		Thomas Reuben Black
Cumberland	Richard L. Black; 2,252; 21.82%	William Oxley; 2,715; 26.30%		Richard L. Black

=== Halifax ===
Electoral district	Candidates			Incumbent
Electoral district	Liberal	Liberal-Conservative	Independent/Other	Incumbent
Halifax	**William Stevens Fielding**; 5,036; 18.86%	H. McDonald Henry; 4,219; 15.80%		William Stevens Fielding
Halifax	William Roche; 4,828; 18.08%	P. O'Mullin; 3,946; 14.77%		William Roche
Halifax	Michael Joseph Power; 4,752; 17.79%	J. J. Stewart; 3,928; 14.71%		Michael Joseph Power

=== Central Nova ===
Electoral district	Candidates			Incumbent
Electoral district	Liberal	Liberal-Conservative	Independent/Other	Incumbent
Antigonish	Angus McGillivray; 1,362; 30.68%	J.J. Cameron; 1,003; 22.60%		Angus McGillivray
Antigonish	Colin Francis McIsaac; 1,274; 28.70%	Archibald McPhee; 800; 18.02%		Colin Francis McIsaac
Guysborough	A. J. O. Maguire; 663; 18.98%	Alexander F. Cameron; 831; 23.78%	Otto Schwartz Weeks (Independent Liberal); 538; 15.40%	Otto Schwartz Weeks
Guysborough	James A. Fraser; 707; 20.23%	Hamilton Morrow; 755; 21.61%		James A. Fraser
Pictou	John Yorston; 2,728; 16.05%	William Cameron; 2,897; 17.05%	Robert Drummond; 2,764; 16.27%	William Cameron
Pictou	James Drummond McGregor; 2,885; 16.98%	Charles Elliott Tanner; 2,835; 16.68%		Jeffrey McColl†
Pictou		Alexander Grant; 2,883; 16.97%		Charles H. Munro†

=== Cape Breton ===
Electoral district	Candidates			Incumbent
Electoral district	Liberal	Liberal-Conservative	Independent/Other	Incumbent
Cape Breton	Angus J. MacDonald; 2,681; 28.23%	Colin Chisholm; 2,097; 22.08%		Colin Chisholm
Cape Breton	Joseph McPherson; 2,579; 27.15%	**William MacKay**; 2,141; 22.54%		William MacKay
Inverness	Daniel McNeil; 1,908; 27.76%	John McKeen; 1,602; 23.31%		Daniel McNeil
Inverness	John McKinnon; 1,874; 27.26%	Angus MacLennan; 1,490; 21.68%		John McKinnon
Richmond	Abraham LeBlanc; 865; 28.47%	David A. Hearn; 669; 22.02%		David A. Hearn
Richmond	Joseph Matheson; 859; 28.28%	Roderick Ferguson; 645; 21.23%		Joseph Matheson
Victoria	N. E. Mckay; 630; 19.28%	John Lemuel Bethune; 846; 25.89%		John Lemuel Bethune
Victoria	John J. McCabe; 86; 2.63%	John Lemuel Bethune; 846; 25.89%		John Lemuel Bethune
Victoria	John A. Fraser; 971; 29.71%	Murdoch G. McLeod; 735; 22.49%		John A. Fraser
