= 44th Nova Scotia general election =

The 44th Nova Scotia general election may refer to

- the 1949 Nova Scotia general election, the 43rd overall general election for Nova Scotia, for the (due to a counting error in 1859) 44th General Assembly of Nova Scotia, or
- the 1953 Nova Scotia general election, the 44th overall general election for Nova Scotia, for the 45th General Assembly of Nova Scotia, but considered the 22nd general election for the Canadian province of Nova Scotia.
