= 1953 Nova Scotia general election =

Canadian provincial election

- May 26, 1953

37 seats of the Nova Scotia House of Assembly 19 seats needed for a majority
- Turnout: 75.79% ▼1.88pp
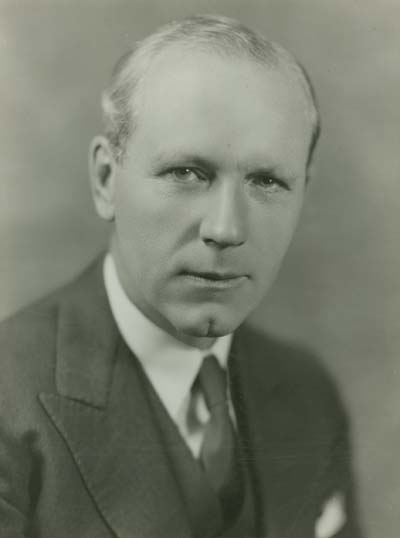

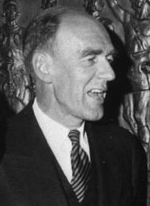

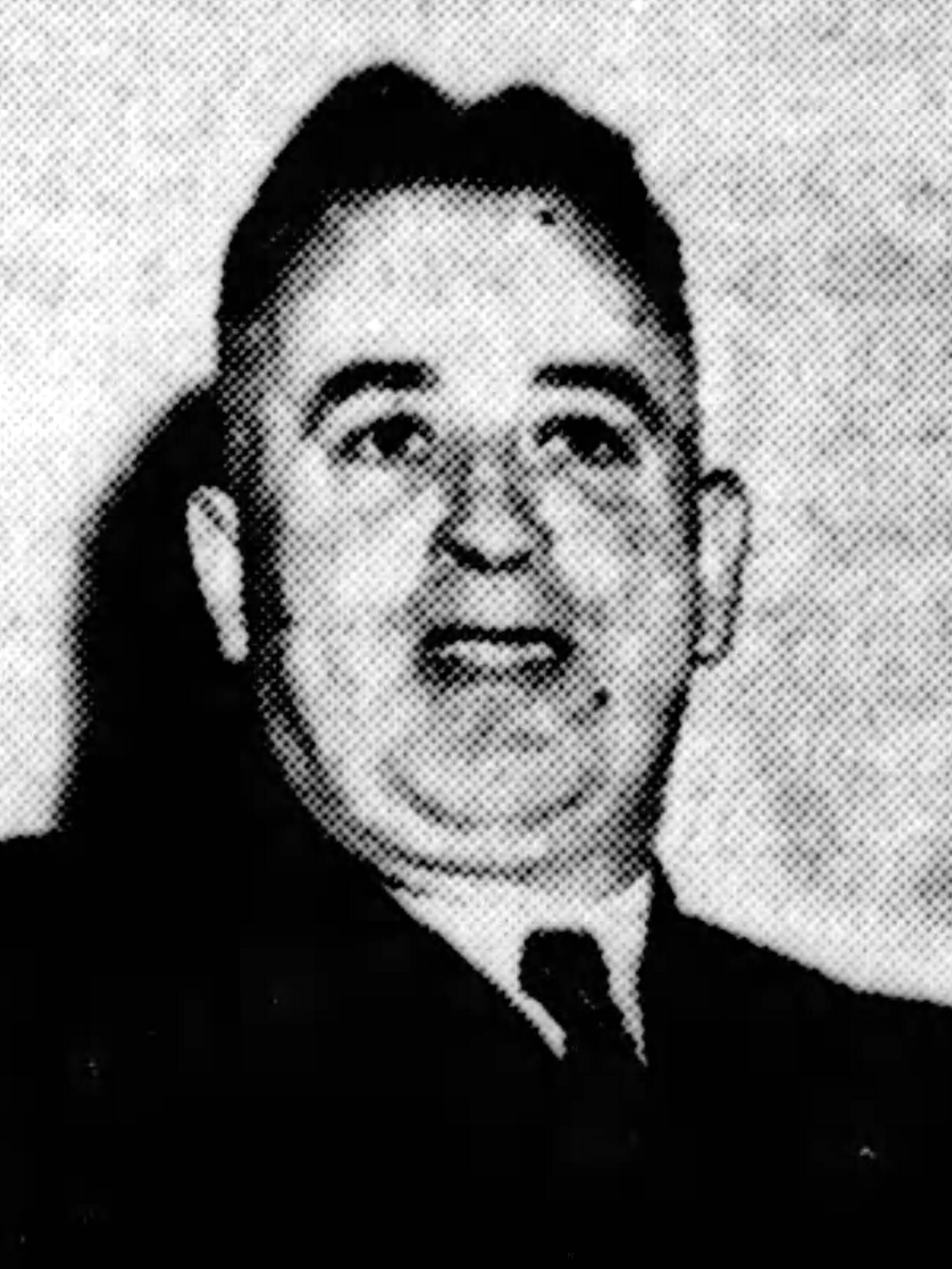
	First party	Second party	Third party
Leader	Angus Lewis Macdonald	Robert Stanfield	Russell Cunningham
Party	Liberal	Progressive Conservative	Co-operative Commonwealth
Leader since	August 31, 1945	November 10, 1948	1945
Leader's seat	Halifax South	Colchester	Cape Breton East
Last election	27	8	2
Seats won	23	12	2
Seat change	▼4	▲4	Steady
Popular vote	169,894	149,973	23,700
Percentage	48.92%	43.18%	6.82%
Swing	▼2.05pp	▲3.97pp	▼2.78pp
Premier before election
Angus Lewis Macdonald
Liberal
Premier after election
Angus Lewis Macdonald
Liberal

The 1953 Nova Scotia general election was held on 26 May 1953 to elect members of the 45th House of Assembly of the province of Nova Scotia, Canada. It was won by the Liberal party.

== Results ==
=== Results by party ===
↓
23	12	2
Liberal	Progressive Conservative	CCF

Official results
Party	Party leader	# of candidates	Seats				Popular vote		
Party	Party leader	# of candidates	1949	Dissolution	Elected	Change	#	%	Change (pp)
Liberal	Angus Lewis Macdonald	37	27	27	23	-4	169,894	48.92%	–2.05%
Progressive Conservative	Robert Stanfield	37	8	8	12	+4	149,973	43.18%	+3.97%
Co-operative Commonwealth	Russell Cunningham	16	2	2	2	0	23,700	6.82%	–2.78%
Independent		1	0	0	0	0	2,065	0.59%	+0.37%
Vacant				0					
Total valid votes							345,632	99.52%	+0.06%
Blank and invalid ballots							1,658	0.48%	–0.06%
Total		91	37	37	37	–	347,290	100.00%	–
Registered voters / turnout							370,293	75.79%	-1.88%

Popular vote
Liberal	48.92%
PC	43.18%
CCF	6.82%
Independent	0.59%

Seats summary
Liberal	62.16%
PC	32.43%
CCF	5.41%

=== Results by region ===
Party name		HRM	Cape Breton	Annapolis Valley	South Shore	Fundy-Northeast	Central Nova	Total
Parties winning seats in the legislature
Liberal	Seats:	5	7	3	1	2	5	23
Liberal	Popular vote:	55.44%	46.98%	49.91%	45.58%	47.95%	49.25%	48.92%
Progressive Conservative	Seats:	0	0	3	5	4	0	12
Progressive Conservative	Popular vote:	40.96%	30.13%	50.09%	53.49%	49.56%	39.00%	43.18%
Co-operative Commonwealth	Seats:	0	2	0	0	0	0	2
Co-operative Commonwealth	Popular vote:	3.60%	22.89%	–	0.93%	2.49%	5.61%	6.82%
Parties not winning seats in the legislature
Independent	Popular vote:	–	–	–	–	–	6.14%	0.59%
Total seats:		5	9	6	6	6	5	37

== Retiring incumbents ==
Progressive Conservative

- E. Keith Potter, Digby

== Nominated candidates ==
Legend
bold denotes party leader
† denotes an incumbent who is not running for re-election or was defeated in nomination contest

=== Valley ===
Electoral district	Candidates				Incumbent
Electoral district	Liberal	PC	CCF	Independent	Incumbent
Annapolis	Henry Hicks; 5,006; 51.55%	Charles F. LeBrun; 4,705; 48.45%			Henry Hicks
Clare	Pierre E. Belliveau; 2,307; 58.46%	Desire J. Comeau; 1,639; 41.54%			Desire J. Comeau
Digby	Victor Cardoza; 2,770; 52.40%	Malcolm Stewart Leonard; 2,516; 47.60%			E. Keith Potter†
Hants West	Ken Eisner; 3,120; 46.37%	George Henry Wilson; 3,608; 53.63%			George Henry Wilson
Kings	David Durell Sutton; 7,245; 24.63%	George Arthur Boggs; 7,481; 25.43%			David Durell Sutton
Kings	William H. Pipe; 7,047; 23.96%	Edward Haliburton; 7,642; 25.98%			William H. Pipe

=== South Shore ===
Electoral district	Candidates				Incumbent
Electoral district	Liberal	PC	CCF	Independent	Incumbent
Lunenburg	Arthur L. Thurlow; 6,940; 21.53%	R. Clifford Levy; 8,727; 27.07%	Winfred Llewellyn; 204; 0.63%		Arthur L. Thurlow
Lunenburg	Gordon E. Romkey; 7,381; 22.90%	Harley J. Spence; 8,741; 27.12%	G. Boyd Crouse; 241; 0.75%		Gordon E. Romkey
Queens	Merrill D. Rawding; 2,838; 45.77%	W. S. Kennedy Jones; 3,230; 52.09%	Claude VanBuskirk; 133; 2.14%		Merrill D. Rawding
Shelburne	Wilfred Dauphinee; 3,256; 51.20%	James McKay Harding; 3,103; 48.80%			Wilfred Dauphinee
Yarmouth	Allan d'Entremont; 4,067; 23.59%	William Heartz Brown; 4,859; 28.18%			William Heartz Brown
Yarmouth	Donald J. Fraser; 3,790; 21.98%	Raymond Z. Bourque; 4,524; 26.24%			Donald J. Fraser

=== Fundy-Northeast ===
Electoral district	Candidates				Incumbent
Electoral district	Liberal	PC	CCF	Independent	Incumbent
Colchester	Gordon Purdy; 7,255; 24.20%	**Robert Stanfield**; 7,677; 25.61%	Harvey Curtis; 324; 1.08%		Robert Stanfield
Colchester	Hector Hill; 6,963; 23.23%	George Isaac Smith; 7,435; 24.80%	Sydney Parker; 326; 1.09%		George Isaac Smith
Cumberland Centre	Archibald J. Mason; 2,012; 40.65%	Stephen T. Pyke; 2,262; 45.70%	Florence Welton; 676; 13.66%		Archibald J. Mason
Cumberland East	Martin J. Kaufman; 4,214; 48.96%	James A. Langille; 4,393; 51.04%			Martin J. Kaufman
Cumberland West	Allison T. Smith; 2,799; 54.55%	Thomas A. Giles; 2,332; 45.45%			Thomas A. Giles
Hants East	Alfred E. Reid; 2,251; 50.01%	Ernest M. Ettinger; 2,250; 49.99%			Ernest M. Ettinger

=== Halifax/Dartmouth/Eastern Shore ===
Electoral district	Candidates				Incumbent
Electoral district	Liberal	PC	CCF	Independent	Incumbent
Halifax Centre	James Edward Rutledge; 5,603; 57.69%	R. Leo Simmonds; 4,109; 42.31%			James Edward Rutledge
Halifax East	Geoffrey W. Stevens; 8,436; 50.83%	Lt. Col. R.D. King; 7,196; 43.36%	Harper Power; 964; 5.81%		Geoffrey W. Stevens
Halifax North	Harold Connolly; 8,148; 61.37%	Harold J. Bartlow; 4,481; 33.75%	Richard J. Hardiman; 648; 4.88%		Harold Connolly
Halifax South	**Angus Lewis Macdonald**; 5,751; 59.68%	John R. Milledge; 3,885; 40.32%			Angus Lewis Macdonald
Halifax West	Ronald Manning Fielding; 8,061; 51.31%	Earle Haverstock; 6,927; 44.09%	L.C. Wilson; 723; 4.60%		Ronald Manning Fielding

=== Central Nova ===
Electoral district	Candidates				Incumbent
Electoral district	Liberal	PC	CCF	Independent	Incumbent
Antigonish	Colin H. Chisholm; 2,624; 48.92%	Terrance Bernard Thompson; 675; 12.58%		Vincent J. MacDonald; 2,065; 38.50%	Colin H. Chisholm
Guysborough	Arthur W. MacKenzie; 3,470; 56.29%	A. Grant MacDonald; 2,694; 43.71%			Arthur W. MacKenzie
Pictou Centre	Alfred B. DeWolfe; 5,155; 45.41%	Robert D. MacDonald; 4,534; 39.94%	Donald Nicholson; 1,662; 14.64%		Alfred B. DeWolfe
Pictou East	John W. MacDonald; 2,681; 48.78%	William A. MacLeod; 2,592; 47.16%	Joseph D. Ryan; 223; 4.06%		John W. MacDonald
Pictou West	Stewart W. Proudfoot; 2,628; 50.09%	Harvey Veniot; 2,619; 49.91%			Stewart W. Proudfoot

=== Cape Breton ===
Electoral district	Candidates				Incumbent
Electoral district	Liberal	PC	CCF	Independent	Incumbent
Cape Breton Centre	Martin MacPherson; 2,816; 30.70%	Charles P. Miller; 1,905; 20.77%	Michael James MacDonald; 4,451; 48.53%		Michael James MacDonald
Cape Breton East	Joseph McIntyre; 3,934; 37.88%	William Wilton; 1,356; 13.06%	**Russell Cunningham**; 5,096; 49.07%		Russell Cunningham
Cape Breton North	Alexander O'Handley; 4,674; 47.45%	John Norman MacAskill; 3,115; 31.62%	Daniel Joseph MacEachern; 2,062; 20.93%		Alexander O'Handley
Cape Breton South	John Smith MacIvor; 6,467; 44.67%	A.O. Gunn; 3,384; 23.38%	Vincent Allan Morrison; 4,625; 31.95%		John Smith MacIvor
Cape Breton West	Malcolm A. Patterson; 3,730; 48.86%	Edward Manson; 2,562; 33.56%	Harry Munroe; 1,342; 17.58%		Malcolm A. Patterson
Inverness	Alexander H. McKinnon; 4,725; 29.17%	Leo P. Boudreau; 3,585; 22.13%			Alexander H. McKinnon
Inverness	Roderick MacLean; 4,513; 27.86%	Alex A. MacInnis; 3,374; 20.83%			Roderick MacLean
Richmond	Earl Wallace Urquhart; 2,970; 58.30%	Francis Whyte; 2,124; 41.70%			Earl Wallace Urquhart
Victoria	Carleton L. MacMillan; 2,247; 56.47%	Joseph L. MacNeil; 1,732; 43.53%			Carleton L. MacMillan
