= 45th Nova Scotia general election =

The 45th Nova Scotia general election may refer to

- the 1953 Nova Scotia general election, the 44th overall general election for Nova Scotia, for the (due to a counting error in 1859) 45th General Assembly of Nova Scotia, or
- the 1956 Nova Scotia general election, the 45th overall general election for Nova Scotia, for the 46th General Assembly of Nova Scotia, but considered the 23rd general election for the Canadian province of Nova Scotia.
