= Halifax Centre =

Former provincial electoral district in Nova Scotia, Canada

Nova Scotia electoral district

Defunct provincial electoral district
- Legislature: Nova Scotia House of Assembly
- District created: 1933
- District abolished: 1967
- Last contested: 1963

Halifax Centre was a provincial electoral district in Nova Scotia, Canada, that elected one member of the Nova Scotia House of Assembly. It existed from 1933 to 1967.

== Members of the Legislative Assembly ==
Halifax Centre elected the following members to the Legislative Assembly:

Halifax Centre
| Legislature | Years | Member | Party |
|---|---|---|---|
District created from Halifax (1867–1933)
| 40th | 1933–1937 | Guy Murray Logan | Liberal |
| 41st | 1937–1939 | William Duff Forrest | Liberal |
| 41st | 1939–1941 | James Edward Rutledge | Liberal |
| 42nd | 1941–1945 | James Edward Rutledge | Liberal |
| 43rd | 1945–1949 | James Edward Rutledge | Liberal |
| 44th | 1949–1953 | James Edward Rutledge | Liberal |
| 45th | 1953–1956 | James Edward Rutledge | Liberal |
| 46th | 1956–1960 | Gordon S. Cowan | Liberal |
| 47th | 1960–1963 | Donald MacKeen Smith | Progressive Conservative |
| 48th | 1963–1967 | Donald MacKeen Smith | Progressive Conservative |
District reformed into Halifax Citadel (1967–2009)

== Election results ==
=== 1963 ===
1963 Nova Scotia general election
| Party | Candidate | Votes | % | ±% |
|---|---|---|---|---|
| Progressive Conservative | Donald MacKeen Smith | 5,478 | 58.57% | 10.56% |
| Liberal | Gordon S. Cowan | 3,875 | 41.43% | -3.95% |
| Total | | 9,353 | – | |
Source(s) Source: Nova Scotia Legislature (2024). "Electoral History for Halifax Centre" (PDF). nslegislature.ca. Nova Scotia Legislature (1963). Returns of the General Election for the House of Assembly (PDF) (Report). Queen's Printer. Archived from the original (PDF) on 25 July 2018.

=== 1960 ===
1960 Nova Scotia general election
| Party | Candidate | Votes | % | ±% |
|---|---|---|---|---|
| Progressive Conservative | Donald MacKeen Smith | 4,921 | 48.01% | 0.92% |
| Liberal | Gordon S. Cowan | 4,651 | 45.38% | -7.53% |
| Co-operative Commonwealth | James M. Murray | 678 | 6.61% | – |
| Total | | 10,250 | – | |
Source(s) Source: Nova Scotia Legislature (2024). "Electoral History for Halifax Centre" (PDF). nslegislature.ca. Nova Scotia Legislature (1960). Returns of the General Election for the House of Assembly (PDF) (Report). Queen's Printer. Archived from the original (PDF) on 25 July 2018.

=== 1956 ===
1956 Nova Scotia general election
| Party | Candidate | Votes | % | ±% |
|---|---|---|---|---|
| Liberal | Gordon S. Cowan | 5,642 | 52.91% | -4.78% |
| Progressive Conservative | David Milsom | 5,022 | 47.09% | 4.78% |
| Total | | 10,664 | – | |
Source(s) Source: Nova Scotia Legislature (2024). "Electoral History for Halifax Centre" (PDF). nslegislature.ca. Nova Scotia Legislature (1956). Returns of the General Election for the House of Assembly (PDF) (Report). Queen's Printer. Archived from the original (PDF) on 10 September 2018.

=== 1953 ===
1953 Nova Scotia general election
| Party | Candidate | Votes | % | ±% |
|---|---|---|---|---|
| Liberal | James Edward Rutledge | 5,603 | 57.69% | 2.99% |
| Progressive Conservative | R. Leo Simmonds | 4,109 | 42.31% | – |
| Total | | 9,712 | – | |
Source(s) Source: Nova Scotia Legislature (2024). "Electoral History for Halifax Centre" (PDF). nslegislature.ca. Nova Scotia Legislature (1953). Returns of the General Election for the House of Assembly (PDF) (Report). Queen's Printer. Archived from the original (PDF) on 10 September 2018.

=== 1949 ===
1949 Nova Scotia general election
| Party | Candidate | Votes | % | ±% |
|---|---|---|---|---|
| Liberal | James Edward Rutledge | 5,725 | 54.71% | -0.52% |
| Liberal-Conservative | Jack L. Dowell | 3,573 | 34.14% | 7.57% |
| Co-operative Commonwealth | Elmore Webber | 1,167 | 11.15% | -7.06% |
| Total | | 10,465 | – | |
Source(s) Source: Nova Scotia Legislature (2024). "Electoral History for Halifax Centre" (PDF). nslegislature.ca. Nova Scotia Legislature (1949). Returns of the General Election for the House of Assembly (PDF) (Report). Queen's Printer. Archived from the original (PDF) on 10 September 2018.

=== 1945 ===
1945 Nova Scotia general election
| Party | Candidate | Votes | % | ±% |
|---|---|---|---|---|
| Liberal | James Edward Rutledge | 4,737 | 55.22% | -4.26% |
| Liberal-Conservative | Carl Palm Bethune | 2,279 | 26.57% | -13.94% |
| Co-operative Commonwealth | R. B. Mitchell | 1,562 | 18.21% | – |
| Total | | 8,578 | – | |
Source(s) Source: Nova Scotia Legislature (2024). "Electoral History for Halifax Centre" (PDF). nslegislature.ca. Nova Scotia Legislature (1945). Returns of the General Election for the House of Assembly (PDF) (Report). Queen's Printer. Archived from the original (PDF) on 10 September 2018.

=== 1941 ===
1941 Nova Scotia general election
| Party | Candidate | Votes | % | ±% |
|---|---|---|---|---|
| Liberal | James Edward Rutledge | 4,226 | 59.49% | 4.88% |
| Liberal-Conservative | Arthur Wilfred Morton | 2,878 | 40.51% | -4.88% |
| Total | | 7,104 | – | |
Source(s) Source: Nova Scotia Legislature (2024). "Electoral History for Halifax Centre" (PDF). nslegislature.ca. Nova Scotia Legislature (1941). Returns of the General Election for the House of Assembly (PDF) (Report). Queen's Printer. Archived from the original (PDF) on 8 February 2024.

=== 1939 ===
Nova Scotia provincial by-election, December 5, 1939
| Party | Candidate | Votes | % | ±% |
|---|---|---|---|---|
| Liberal | James Edward Rutledge | acclaimed | N/A | – |
| Total | | | – | |
Source(s) Source: Nova Scotia Legislature (2024). "Electoral History for Halifax Centre" (PDF). nslegislature.ca.

=== 1937 ===
1937 Nova Scotia general election
| Party | Candidate | Votes | % | ±% |
|---|---|---|---|---|
| Liberal | William Duff Forrest | 5,186 | 54.61% | 0.17% |
| Liberal-Conservative | Arthur Wilfred Morton | 4,310 | 45.39% | 1.45% |
| Total | | 9,496 | – | |
Source(s) Source: Nova Scotia Legislature (2024). "Electoral History for Halifax Centre" (PDF). nslegislature.ca. Nova Scotia Legislature (1937). Returns of the General Election for the House of Assembly (PDF) (Report). Queen's Printer. Archived from the original (PDF) on 1 March 2019.

=== 1933 ===
1933 Nova Scotia general election
| Party | Candidate | Votes | % | ±% |
|---|---|---|---|---|
| Liberal | Guy Murray Logan | 4,915 | 54.44% | – |
| Liberal-Conservative | Russell McInnes | 3,967 | 43.94% | – |
| United Front | Joe Wallace | 146 | 1.62% | – |
| Total | | 9,028 | – | |
Source(s) Source: Nova Scotia Legislature (2024). "Electoral History for Halifax Centre" (PDF). nslegislature.ca. Nova Scotia Legislature (1933). Returns of the General Election for the House of Assembly (PDF) (Report). Queen's Printer. Archived from the original (PDF) on 1 March 2019.

== See also ==
- List of Nova Scotia provincial electoral districts
- Canadian provincial electoral districts
