= 1949 Nova Scotia general election =

Canadian provincial election

- June 9, 1949

37 seats of the Nova Scotia House of Assembly 19 seats needed for a majority
- Turnout: 77.67% ▲12.99pp
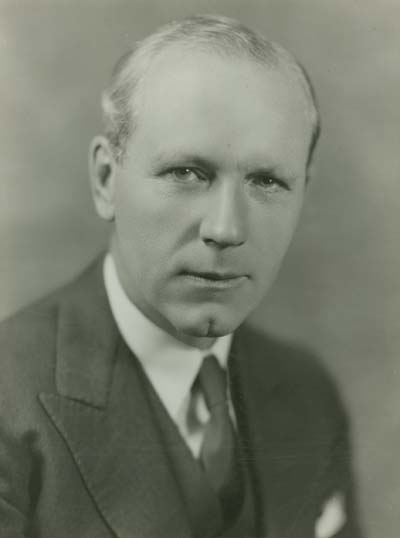

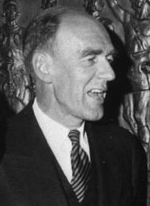

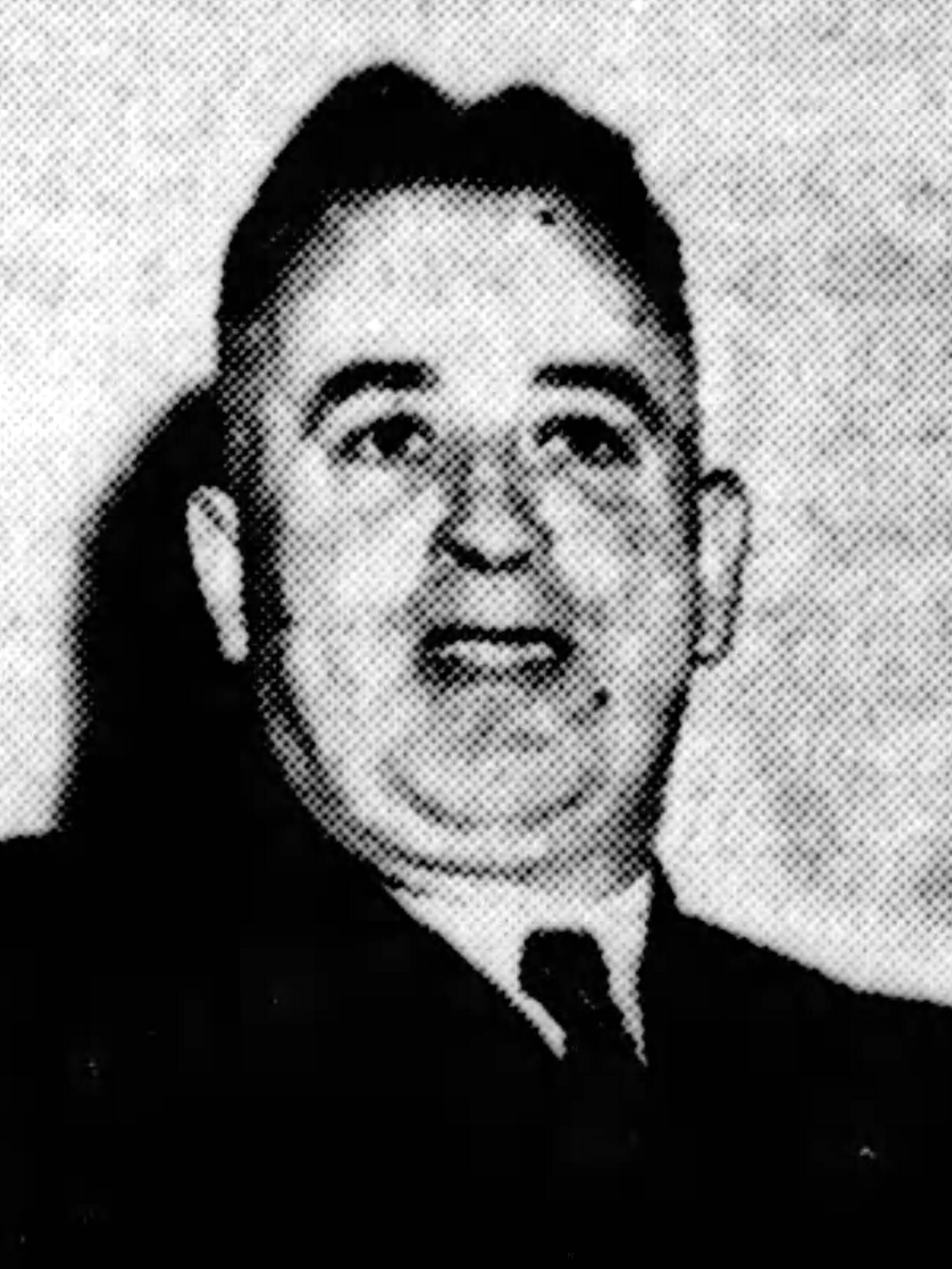
	First party	Second party	Third party
Leader	Angus Lewis Macdonald	Robert Stanfield	Russell Cunningham
Party	Liberal	Progressive Conservative	Co-operative Commonwealth
Leader since	August 31, 1945	November 10, 1948	1945
Leader's seat	Halifax South	Colchester	Cape Breton East
Last election	28	0	2
Seats won	27	8	2
Seat change	▼1	▲8	Steady
Popular vote	178,177	134,311	34,036
Percentage	51.0%	39.2%	9.6%
Swing	▼2.08%	▲6.18%	▼4.10%
Premier before election
Angus Lewis Macdonald
Liberal
Premier after election
Angus Lewis Macdonald
Liberal

The 1949 Nova Scotia general election was held on 9 June 1949 to elect members of the 44th House of Assembly of the province of Nova Scotia, Canada. It was won by the Liberal party. The Progressive Conservatives returned to the legislature after their wipeout in the 1945 general election, but their eight seats put them in a distant second place to the Liberals' 37.

== Results ==
=== Results by party ===
↓
27	8	2
Liberal	Progressive Conservative	CCF

Official results
Party	Party leader	# of candidates	Seats				Popular vote		
Party	Party leader	# of candidates	1945	Dissolution	Elected	Change	#	%	Change (pp)
Liberal	Angus Lewis Macdonald	38	28		28	0	178,177	50.97%	-2.08%
Progressive Conservative	Robert Stanfield	37	0		7	+7	134,311	39.21%	+6.18%
Co-operative Commonwealth	Donald MacDonald	22	2		2	0	34,036	9.60%	-4.10%
Independent/Other		1	0		0	0	749	0.22%	N/A
Vacant									
Total valid votes							342,533	%	–
Blank and invalid ballots							1,857	0.54%	–
Total		96	30	30	37	–	344,390	100.00%	–
Registered voters / turnout							369,117	77.67%	

Popular vote
Liberal	50.97%
PC	39.21%
CCF	9.60%
Others	0.22%

Seats summary
Liberal	72.97%
PC	21.62%
CCF	5.41%

== Retiring incumbents ==
Liberal

- John Malcolm Campbell, Victoria
- John Patrick Gorman, Antigonish
- Gordon Purdy, Colchester
- Henry A. Waterman, Yarmouth

== Nominated candidates ==
Legend

bold denotes party leader
† denotes an incumbent who is not running for re-election or was defeated in nomination contest

=== Valley ===
Electoral district	Candidates				Incumbent
Electoral district	Liberal	CCF	PC	Independent	Incumbent
Annapolis	Henry Hicks; 5,091; 52.29%	Louisa Anna Shaw; 198; 2.03%	Harry Thompson MacKenzie; 4,447; 45.68%		Henry Hicks
Clare	Benoit Comeau; 2,078; 49.55%		Desire J. Comeau; 2,116; 50.45%		New riding
Digby	Blanchard Spring Morrell; 2,748; 49.26%		E. Keith Potter; 2,830; 50.74%		Vacant
Hants West	George B. Cole; 2,530; 39.67%	Ralph Loomer; 569; 8.92%	George Henry Wilson; 2,529; 39.66%	Gordon B. Crossley; 749; 11.75%	New riding
Kings	David Durell Sutton; 7,322; 25.34%		Hiram Thomas; 7,061; 24.44%		David Durell Sutton
Kings	William H. Pipe; 7,369; 25.51%		Edward Haliburton; 7,138; 24.71%		New seat

=== South Shore ===
Electoral district	Candidates				Incumbent
Electoral district	Liberal	CCF	PC	Independent	Incumbent
Lunenburg	Arthur L. Thurlow; 7,145; 23.49%	Orris A. MacLaren; 844; 2.77%	R. Clifford Levy; 6,935; 22.80%		Vacant
Lunenburg	Gordon E. Romkey; 7,814; 25.69%	Lemuel O. Murphy; 871; 2.86%	Fred Rhodenizer; 6,807; 22.38%		Gordon E. Romkey
Queens	Merrill D. Rawding; 3,166; 50.21%	J.N. McIntyre; 299; 4.74%	E.M. More; 2,840; 45.04%		Merrill D. Rawding
Shelburne	Wilfred Dauphinee; 3,436; 53.20%		Reginald Donald Ross; 3,023; 46.80%		Wilfred Dauphinee
Yarmouth	Joseph Israel Pothier; 4,601; 24.38%		William Heartz Brown; 5,322; 28.20%		New seat
Yarmouth	Donald J. Fraser; 4,751; 25.18%		Alfred B. d'Entremont; 4,197; 22.24%		Henry A. Waterman†

=== Fundy-Northeast ===
Electoral district	Candidates				Incumbent
Electoral district	Liberal	CCF	PC	Independent	Incumbent
Colchester	W.J. MacDonald; 6,968; 23.23%	A.L. Lynds; 513; 1.71%	**Robert Stanfield**; 8,081; 26.94%		Gordon Purdy†
Colchester	Robert F. McLellan; 6,857; 22.86%		George Isaac Smith; 7,580; 25.27%		Robert F. McLellan
Cumberland Centre	Archibald J. Mason; 2,219; 42.41%	Florence Welton; 1,406; 26.87%	Archie B. Smith; 1,607; 30.71%		New riding
Cumberland East	Martin J. Kaufman; 4,280; 49.79%	Brenton Garnhum; 697; 8.11%	Arnold G. McLellan; 3,619; 42.10%		Martin J. Kaufman; Cumberland
Cumberland West	Kenneth Judson Cochrane; 2,645; 48.38%		Thomas A. Giles; 2,822; 51.62%		Kenneth Judson Cochrane; Cumberland
Hants East	Robert A. MacLellan; 2,069; 46.62%	Johnston B. Hart; 272; 6.13%	Ernest M. Ettinger; 2,097; 47.25%		Robert A. MacLellan; Hants

=== Halifax/Dartmouth/Eastern Shore ===
Electoral district	Candidates				Incumbent
Electoral district	Liberal	CCF	PC	Independent	Incumbent
Halifax Centre	James Edward Rutledge; 5,725; 54.71%	Elmore Webber; 1,167; 11.15%	Jack L. Dowell; 3,573; 34.14%		James Edward Rutledge
Halifax East	Geoffrey W. Stevens; 7,703; 52.22%	Wallace Mason; 2,773; 18.80%	R. Graham Murray; 4,274; 28.98%		Geoffrey W. Stevens
Halifax North	Harold Connolly; 7,944; 54.79%	Arthur Kenneth Green; 2,066; 14.25%	Richard Donahoe; 4,489; 30.96%		Harold Connolly
Halifax South	**Angus Lewis Macdonald**; 6,097; 59.57%	Edward Coombs; 926; 9.05%	John R. Milledge; 3,212; 31.38%		Angus Lewis Macdonald
Halifax West	Ronald Manning Fielding; 6,788; 49.88%	Fred M. Young; 3,027; 22.24%	Malcolm Edgbert Walker; 3,795; 27.88%		Ronald Manning Fielding

=== Central Nova ===
Electoral district	Candidates				Incumbent
Electoral district	Liberal	CCF	PC	Independent	Incumbent
Antigonish	Colin H. Chisholm; 3,179; 58.23%		Terrance Bernard Thompson; 2,280; 41.77%		John Patrick Gorman†
Guysborough	Arthur W. MacKenzie; 4,041; 64.19%		Hugh A.K. Forbes; 2,254; 35.81%		Arthur W. MacKenzie
Pictou Centre	Alfred B. DeWolfe; 5,283; 47.49%	Alvin M. Stewart; 1,343; 12.07%	John A. MacGregor; 4,499; 40.44%		Alfred B. DeWolfe; Pictou
Pictou East	John W. MacDonald; 2,455; 46.55%	Collie G. Ross; 603; 11.43%	William A. MacLeod; 2,216; 42.02%		Vacant; Pictou
Pictou West	Stewart W. Proudfoot; 2,817; 55.04%		Donald R. Gilchrist; 2,301; 44.96%		New riding

=== Cape Breton ===
Electoral district	Candidates				Incumbent
Electoral district	Liberal	CCF	PC	Independent	Incumbent
Cape Breton Centre	Ronald McIsaac; 3,271; 40.17%	Michael James MacDonald; 3,339; 41.01%	Joseph A. MacDonald; 1,532; 18.82%		Michael James MacDonald
Cape Breton East	Charles Roy MacDonald; 3,829; 36.59%	**Russell Cunningham**; 4,543; 43.41%	Thomas Horace Dickson; 2,093; 20.00%		Russell Cunningham
Cape Breton North	Alexander O'Handley; 4,727; 46.13%	Wendell Coldwell; 2,502; 24.42%	John Michael Macdonald; 3,018; 29.45%		Alexander O'Handley
Cape Breton South	John Smith MacIvor; 6,742; 47.20%	Vincent Allan Morrison; 3,740; 26.18%	Ross Anderson MacKimmie; 3,802; 26.62%		John Smith MacIvor
Cape Breton West	Malcolm A. Patterson; 3,444; 51.14%	Arthur Briggs; 1,171; 17.39%	David McLeod; 2,120; 31.48%		Malcolm A. Patterson
Inverness	Alexander H. McKinnon; 6,168; 37.72%		Alcorn A. Munro; 2,368; 14.48%		Alexander H. McKinnon
Inverness	Roderick MacLean; 5,562; 34.01%		George H. Penny; 2,254; 13.78%		New seat
Richmond	Lauchlin Daniel Currie; 3,254; 66.49%		D.W. Morrison; 1,640; 33.51%		Lauchlin Daniel Currie
Victoria	Carleton L. MacMillan; 2,486; 61.75%		Phillip MacLeod; 1,540; 38.25%		John Malcolm Campbell†
