= James Everett Kinsman =

Canadian politician from Nova Scotia (1855–1924)

Member of the Nova Scotia House of Assembly for Kings County
- In office June 20, 1916 – July 26, 1920

Personal details
- Born: January 20, 1855 Centreville (Kings), Nova Scotia
- Died: February 20, 1924 (aged 69) Cambridge (Kings), Nova Scotia
- Party: Liberal Conservative
- Spouse(s): Clare Rand; Lulu Webster
- Occupation: farmer, politician

James Everett Kinsman (January 20, 1855 – February 20, 1924) was a farmer and political figure in Nova Scotia, Canada. He represented Kings County in the Nova Scotia House of Assembly from 1916 to 1920 as a Liberal Conservative member.

Kinsman was born in 1855 at Centreville, Nova Scotia to Theodore Kinsman and Rosanne Borden. He married Clare Rand, daughter of Leander Rand, and later married Lulu Webster. Kinsman died in 1924 at Cambridge, Nova Scotia.

He was elected in the 1916 Nova Scotia general election but was unsuccessful in the 1920 Nova Scotia general election.
