= Gordon S. Cowan =

Canadian politician

MLA for Halifax Centre
- In office 1956–1960
- Preceded by: James Edward Rutledge
- Succeeded by: Donald MacKeen Smith

Personal details
- Born: May 19, 1911 St. John's, Newfoundland
- Died: June 11, 1988 (aged 77) Halifax, Nova Scotia
- Party: Nova Scotia Liberal Party
- Occupation: lawyer

Gordon Stewart Cowan (May 19, 1911 – June 11, 1988) was a Canadian politician and judge. He represented the electoral district of Halifax Centre in the Nova Scotia House of Assembly from 1956 to 1960. He was a member of the Nova Scotia Liberal Party.

Born in 1911 at St. John's, Newfoundland, Cowan was educated at Memorial University of Newfoundland, Dalhousie University, Exeter College, Oxford, and was a Rhodes Scholar, Newfoundland. He married Jean E. Rettie in 1937, and then Jean C. (MacDaniel) Mann in 1973. Cowan was employed as an assistant professor at Dalhousie Law School from 1936 to 1939, and Manitoba Law School from 1939 to 1941, before practicing law in Halifax from 1941 to 1966.

Cowan entered provincial politics in the 1956 election, winning the Halifax Centre riding by 620 votes. He was defeated by Progressive Conservative Donald MacKeen Smith when he ran for re-election in 1960. In November 1962, Cowan was a candidate for the leadership of the Nova Scotia Liberal Party, but lost by 11 votes to Earl Urquhart. Cowan tried to regain the Halifax Centre seat in the 1963 election, but Smith defeated him by 1603 votes. On August 1, 1966, Cowan was appointed a judge of the Nova Scotia Supreme Court. He served as Chief Justice of the Trial Division from February 16, 1967, until he retired on September 30, 1981. Cowan was appointed an Officer of the Order of Canada in December 1985. Cowan died at Halifax on June 11, 1988.
