= Alfred Parker Welton =

Canadian politician from Nova Scotia (1836–1916/1917)

Member of the Nova Scotia House of Assembly for Kings County
- In office May 21, 1890 – January 24, 1894

Personal details
- Born: July 15, 1836 Kingston, Nova Scotia
- Died: 1916/1917
- Party: Liberal
- Spouse(s): May Pierson; Bessie Young
- Occupation: farmer, politician

Alfred Parker Welton (July 15, 1836 – 1916/1917) was a farmer and political figure in Nova Scotia, Canada. He represented Kings County in the Nova Scotia House of Assembly from 1890 to 1894 as a Liberal member. Welton was born in 1836 at Kingston, Nova Scotia to Sidney Welton and Isabel Morse. He married May Pierson on January 3, 1863, and later married Bessie Young on June 15, 1878. Welton served as a municipal councillor and was appointed to the Legislative Council of Nova Scotia on January 25, 1895, serving until his death. Welton died around 1916 or 1917.

Welton unsuccessfully contested the 1886 Nova Scotia general election, and was successful in the 1890 Nova Scotia general election.
