= 29th Nova Scotia general election =

The 29th Nova Scotia general election may refer to

- the 1886 Nova Scotia general election, the 28th overall general election for Nova Scotia, for the (due to a counting error in 1859) 29th General Assembly of Nova Scotia,
- the 1890 Nova Scotia general election, the 29th overall general election for Nova Scotia, for the 30th General Assembly of Nova Scotia, but considered the 7th general election for the Canadian province of Nova Scotia, or
- the 1978 Nova Scotia general election, the 51st overall general election for Nova Scotia, for the 52nd Legislative Assembly of Nova Scotia, but considered the 29th general election for the Canadian province of Nova Scotia.
