= William H. Pipe =

Canadian politician

MLA for Kings County
- In office 1949–1953
- Preceded by: David Durell Sutton
- Succeeded by: Edward Haliburton; George Arthur Boggs

Personal details
- Born: December 3, 1914 Amherst, Nova Scotia
- Died: December 17, 1987 (aged 73) Amherst, Nova Scotia
- Party: Liberal
- Occupation: lawyer

William Harvey Pipe (December 3, 1914 – December 17, 1987) was a Canadian politician. He represented the electoral district of Kings County in the Nova Scotia House of Assembly from 1949 to 1953. He was a member of the Nova Scotia Liberal Party.

Born in 1914 at Amherst, Nova Scotia, Pipe was educated at the University of King's College and Dalhousie University. He married Frida Flint in 1940, and was a lawyer by career. Pipe entered provincial politics in 1949 when he was elected in the dual-member Kings County riding with Liberal David Durell Sutton. In the 1953 election, both Pipe and Sutton were defeated by Progressive Conservatives Edward Haliburton, and George Arthur Boggs. Following his defeat, Pipe served on the Board of Commissioners of Public Utilities, and in various legal capacities with Toronto General Trusts Company, Canadian General Electric Co., and Bell Telephone Co. of Canada. He died in 1987.
