= James Sealy =

Canadian politician from Nova Scotia (1862–1932)

Member of the Nova Scotia House of Assembly for Kings County
- In office January 16, 1923 – 1925

Personal details
- Born: September 23, 1862 Saint John, New Brunswick
- Died: August 15, 1932 (aged 69) Kentville, Nova Scotia
- Party: Liberal
- Spouse: Susan Orchard
- Occupation: sales representative, dry goods merchant, politician

James Sealy (September 23, 1862 – August 15, 1932) was a sales representative, dry goods merchant, and political figure in Nova Scotia, Canada. He represented Kings County in the Nova Scotia House of Assembly from 1923 to 1925 as a Liberal member.

Sealy was born in 1862 at Saint John, New Brunswick to Thomas Sealy and Mary J. Dean. He married Susan Orchard, of Saint John. He served as a councillor for the Town of Kentville, Nova Scotia. Sealy died in 1932 at Kentville, Nova Scotia.

Sealy was acclaimed in the January 16, 1923, by-election to replace Harry H. Wickwire after his death, and resigned prior to the 1925 Nova Scotia general election. He was also a candidate for the Laurier Liberals in the 1917 Canadian federal election in the district of Kings, where he lost to Prime Minister Robert Borden.

== Election results ==
1917 Canadian federal election: Kings
Party	Candidate	Votes	%	Elected
Government (Unionist)	Robert Borden	3,941	60.96	✓
Opposition (Laurier Liberals)	James Sealy	2,524	39.04	
Total valid votes		6,465	100.0	
Source(s) "Kings, Nova Scotia (1867-08-06 - 1925-09-04)". History of Federal Ridings Since 1867. Library of Parliament.
