= D. L. George Henley =

Canadian politician

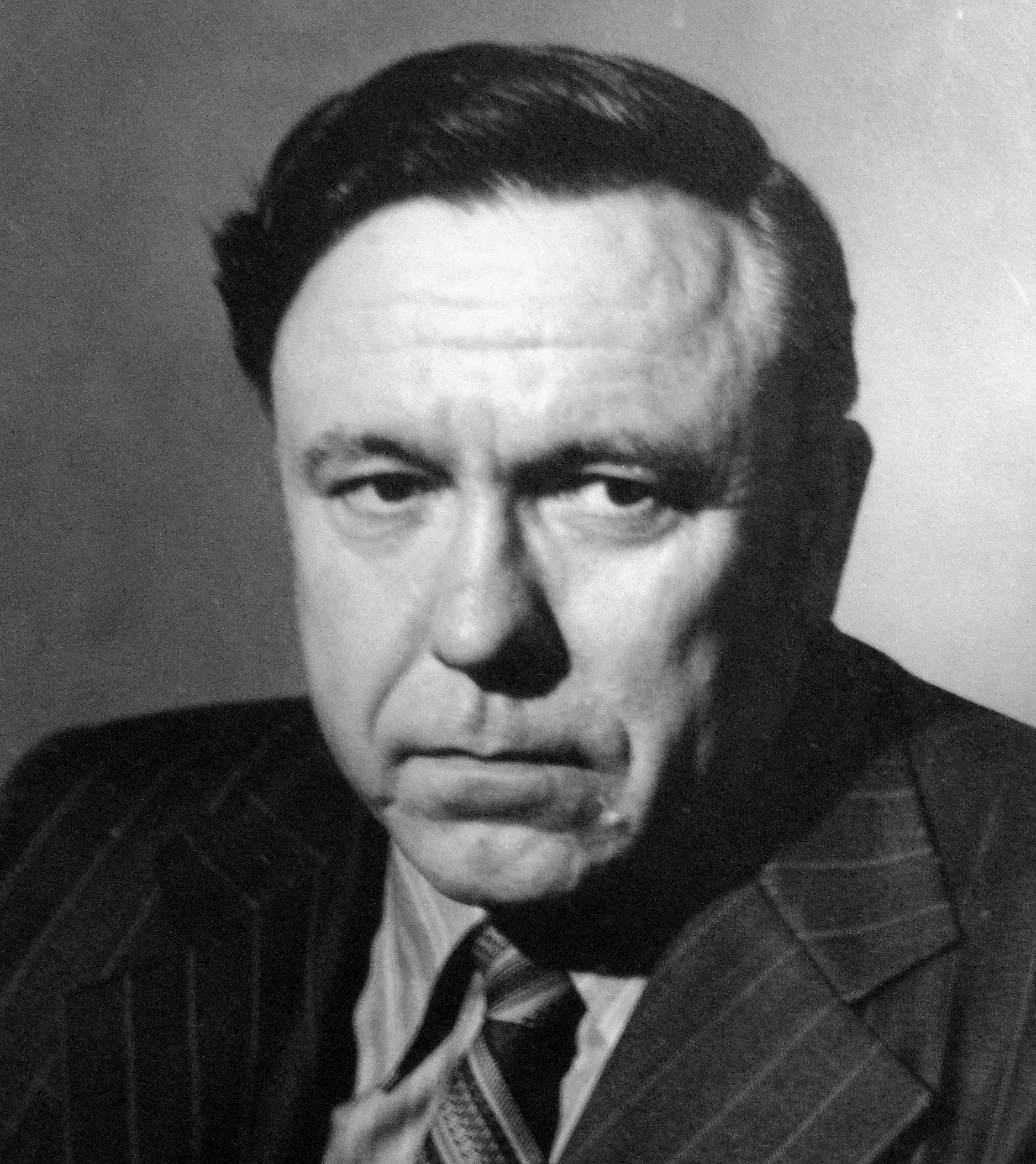
- Henley, c. 1973

MLA for Cumberland West
- In office 1963–1984
- Preceded by: Allison T. Smith
- Succeeded by: Gardner (Bud) Hurley

Personal details
- Born: January 11, 1917; Roslin, Nova Scotia
- Died: May 29, 1996 (aged 79); Halifax, Nova Scotia
- Political party: Progressive Conservative
- Profession: politician

David Lloyd George Henley (January 11, 1917 – May 29, 1996) was a Canadian politician. He represented the electoral district of Cumberland West in the Nova Scotia House of Assembly from Oct. 8 1963 to Nov. 6, 1984. He was a member of the Nova Scotia Progressive Conservative Party.

Henley was born in Roslin, Cumberland County, Nova Scotia, the son of Samuel Bickford and Estella Marie (née Murphy) Henley. He attended Dalhousie University and was a Pharmacist. His early education was in a one-room school house in Roslin, NS. He served in World War II with the Royal Air Force from 1939 to 1945. He was a radar technician, taking his training in Toronto, Ontario before going overseas. During the war he served in Great Britain and Africa. In 1946, he married Muriel Pearl Russell. He graduated from the Dalhousie University School of Pharmacy in 1951. He and his wife Muriel had 8 children: Terrence, Richard, Nancy, Michael, Gregory, Kevin, William and Thomas. He served in the Executive Council of Nova Scotia as Minister of Lands and Forests, and Minister without portfolio. He died in 1996.
