= Halifax West (provincial electoral district) =

Former provincial electoral district in Nova Scotia, Canada

Nova Scotia electoral district

Defunct provincial electoral district
- Legislature: Nova Scotia House of Assembly
- District created: 1933
- District abolished: 1967
- Last contested: 1963

Halifax West was a provincial electoral district in Nova Scotia, Canada, that elected one member to the Nova Scotia House of Assembly. It was formed in 1933 when Halifax County was divided into five distinct electoral districts. In 1955, the district of Halifax Northwest was created from a portion of Halifax West. Following a name change in 1966 to Halifax County West, the district was redistributed entirely to create the current district of Halifax-St. Margaret's in 1967.

== Members of the Legislative Assembly ==
Halifax West elected the following members to the Legislative Assembly.

Halifax West
Legislature	Years	Member	Party
District created from Halifax County (1867–1933)
40th	1933–1937	George E. Hagen	Liberal
41st	1937–1940	George E. Hagen	Liberal
41st	1940–1941	Ronald Manning Fielding	Liberal
42nd	1941–1945	Ronald Manning Fielding	Liberal
43rd	1945–1949	Ronald Manning Fielding	Liberal
44th	1949–1953	Ronald Manning Fielding	Liberal
45th	1953–1956	Ronald Manning Fielding	Liberal
46th	1956–1960	Charles H. Reardon	Liberal
47th	1960–1963	Charles H. Reardon	Liberal
48th	1963–1967	D. C. McNeil	Progressive Conservative
District dissolved into Halifax-St. Margaret's (1967–1993)

== Election results ==
=== 1963 ===
1963 Nova Scotia general election
Party	Candidate	Votes	%	±%
Progressive Conservative	D. C. McNeil	8,792	57.00%	11.94%
Liberal	Charles H. Reardon	6,126	39.72%	-6.97%
New Democratic	Harold J. Martell	506	3.28%	-4.98%
Total		15,424	–	
Source(s) Source: Nova Scotia Legislature (2024). "Electoral History for Halifax West" (PDF). nslegislature.ca. Nova Scotia Legislature (1963). Returns of the General Election for the House of Assembly (PDF) (Report). Queen's Printer. Archived from the original (PDF) on 25 July 2018.

=== 1960 ===
1960 Nova Scotia general election
Party	Candidate	Votes	%	±%
Liberal	Charles H. Reardon	6,925	46.68%	-4.33%
Progressive Conservative	D. C. McNeil	6,684	45.06%	-3.92%
Co-operative Commonwealth	Harold J. Martell	1,225	8.26%	–
Total		14,834	–	
Source(s) Source: Nova Scotia Legislature (2024). "Electoral History for Halifax West" (PDF). nslegislature.ca. Nova Scotia Legislature (1960). Returns of the General Election for the House of Assembly (PDF) (Report). Queen's Printer. Archived from the original (PDF) on 25 July 2018.

=== 1956 ===
1956 Nova Scotia general election
Party	Candidate	Votes	%	±%
Liberal	Charles H. Reardon	6,119	51.02%	-0.29%
Progressive Conservative	William J. Dalton	5,875	48.98%	4.89%
Total		11,994	–	
Source(s) Source: Nova Scotia Legislature (2024). "Electoral History for Halifax West" (PDF). nslegislature.ca. Nova Scotia Legislature (1956). Returns of the General Election for the House of Assembly (PDF) (Report). Queen's Printer. Archived from the original (PDF) on 10 September 2018.

=== 1953 ===
1953 Nova Scotia general election
Party	Candidate	Votes	%	±%
Liberal	Ronald Manning Fielding	8,061	51.31%	1.43%
Progressive Conservative	Earl Haverstock	6,927	44.09%	16.21%
Co-operative Commonwealth	Lloyd C. Wilson	723	4.60%	-17.64%
Total		15,711	–	
Source(s) Source: Nova Scotia Legislature (2024). "Electoral History for Halifax West" (PDF). nslegislature.ca. Nova Scotia Legislature (1953). Returns of the General Election for the House of Assembly (PDF) (Report). Queen's Printer. Archived from the original (PDF) on 10 September 2018.

=== 1949 ===
1949 Nova Scotia general election
Party	Candidate	Votes	%	±%
Liberal	Ronald Manning Fielding	6,788	49.88%	0.76%
Progressive Conservative	Malcolm Edgbert Walker	3,795	27.88%	0.50%
Co-operative Commonwealth	Fred Young	3,027	22.24%	-1.27%
Total		13,610	–	
Source(s) Source: Nova Scotia Legislature (2024). "Electoral History for Halifax West" (PDF). nslegislature.ca. Nova Scotia Legislature (1949). Returns of the General Election for the House of Assembly (PDF) (Report). Queen's Printer. Archived from the original (PDF) on 10 September 2018.

=== 1945 ===
1945 Nova Scotia general election
Party	Candidate	Votes	%	±%
Liberal	Ronald Manning Fielding	4,997	49.11%	-9.26%
Progressive Conservative	Malcolm Edgbert Walker	2,786	27.38%	-14.25%
Co-operative Commonwealth	Fred Young	2,392	23.51%	–
Total		10,175	–	
Source(s) Source: Nova Scotia Legislature (2024). "Electoral History for Halifax West" (PDF). nslegislature.ca. Nova Scotia Legislature (1945). Returns of the General Election for the House of Assembly (PDF) (Report). Queen's Printer. Archived from the original (PDF) on 10 September 2018.

=== 1941 ===
1941 Nova Scotia general election
Party	Candidate	Votes	%	±%
Liberal	Ronald Manning Fielding	4,459	58.37%	4.37%
Progressive Conservative	John Shenstoneq Roper	3,180	41.63%	-4.37%
Total		7,639	–	
Source(s) Source: Nova Scotia Legislature (2024). "Electoral History for Halifax West" (PDF). nslegislature.ca. Nova Scotia Legislature (1941). Returns of the General Election for the House of Assembly (PDF) (Report). Queen's Printer. Archived from the original (PDF) on 8 February 2024.

=== 1940 ===
Nova Scotia provincial by-election, 1940-10-28
Party	Candidate	Votes	%	±%
Liberal	George E. Hagen	acclaimed	N/A	–
Total			–	
Source(s) Source: Nova Scotia Legislature (2024). "Electoral History for Halifax West" (PDF). nslegislature.ca.

=== 1937 ===
1937 Nova Scotia general election
Party	Candidate	Votes	%	±%
Liberal	George E. Hagen	5,034	54.00%	-0.83%
Progressive Conservative	Earle C. Phinney	4,288	46.00%	–
Total		9,322	–	
Source(s) Source: Nova Scotia Legislature (2024). "Electoral History for Halifax West" (PDF). nslegislature.ca. Nova Scotia Legislature (1937). Returns of the General Election for the House of Assembly (PDF) (Report). Queen's Printer. Archived from the original (PDF) on 1 March 2019.

=== 1933 ===
1933 Nova Scotia general election
Party	Candidate	Votes	%	±%
Liberal	George E. Hagen	4,804	54.83%	–
Liberal-Conservative	Angus MacDonald Morton	3,957	45.17%	–
Total		8,761	–	
Source(s) Source: Nova Scotia Legislature (2024). "Electoral History for Halifax West" (PDF). nslegislature.ca. Nova Scotia Legislature (1933). Returns of the General Election for the House of Assembly (PDF) (Report). Queen's Printer. Archived from the original (PDF) on 1 March 2019.

== See also ==
- List of Nova Scotia provincial electoral districts
- Canadian provincial electoral districts
