= Gardner Hurley =

Canadian politician

Gardner "Bud" Hurley

MLA for Cumberland West
- In office 1984–1988
- Preceded by: D. L. George Henley
- Succeeded by: Ross Bragg

Personal details
- Born: June 28, 1932 Maccan, Nova Scotia, Canada
- Died: March 5, 2023 (aged 90) Amherst, Nova Scotia, Canada
- Party: Progressive Conservative

Gardner Payne "Bud" Hurley (June 28, 1932 – March 5, 2023) was a Canadian politician who represented the electoral district of Cumberland West in the Nova Scotia House of Assembly from 1984 to 1988. He was a member of the Progressive Conservative Party of Nova Scotia.

A resident of Maccan, Nova Scotia, Hurley served as Warden of Cumberland County in the early 1980s. He entered provincial politics in the 1984 election, winning the Cumberland West riding by 658 votes. In the 1988 election, he was defeated by Liberal Ross Bragg by 83 votes.
