= Donald MacKeen Smith =

Canadian politician (1923–1998)

MLA for Halifax Citadel
- In office 1967–1970
- Preceded by: new riding
- Succeeded by: Ronald Wallace

MLA for Halifax Centre
- In office 1960–1967
- Preceded by: Gordon S. Cowan
- Succeeded by: riding dissolved

Personal details
- Born: November 26, 1923 Halifax, Nova Scotia
- Died: February 16, 1998 (aged 74) Halifax, Nova Scotia
- Party: Progressive Conservative
- Occupation: business executive

Donald MacKeen Smith (November 26, 1923 – February 16, 1998) was a Canadian politician. He represented the electoral districts of Halifax Centre and Halifax Citadel in the Nova Scotia House of Assembly from 1960 to 1970 as a member of the Progressive Conservatives.

== Biography ==
Born in 1923 at Halifax, Nova Scotia, Smith was educated at the University of King's College and Dalhousie University. He served with the 18th Armoured Car Regiment from 1944 to 1945. He married Helen Elizabeth Guildford in 1949. A business executive by career, Smith was president of J.E. Morse and Co. Ltd.

Smith entered provincial politics in the 1960 election, defeating Liberal incumbent Gordon S. Cowan by 270 votes in the Halifax Centre riding. In December 1961, Smith was appointed to the Executive Council of Nova Scotia as Minister of Mines. He was re-elected in 1963, defeating Cowan by 1603 votes. In the 1967 election, Smith was re-elected in the newly established Halifax Citadel riding. Smith resigned from cabinet in February 1969, and was defeated by Liberal Ron Wallace when he ran for re-election in 1970. In January 1980, Smith was appointed Agent General for the Province of Nova Scotia in London. Smith died at Halifax on February 16, 1998.
