= Archibald Menzies Covert =

Canadian politician from Nova Scotia (1870–1922)

Member of the Nova Scotia House of Assembly for Kings County
- In office June 14, 1911 – July 19, 1916

Member of the Legislative Council of Nova Scotia
- In office May 17, 1917 – September 4, 1922

Personal details
- Born: May 3, 1870 Musquash, New Brunswick
- Died: September 4, 1922 (aged 52) Halifax, Nova Scotia
- Party: Liberal
- Spouse: Minnie Clarke
- Education: McGill University (MDCM)
- Occupation: physician, surgeon, politician

Archibald Menzies Covert (May 3, 1870 – September 4, 1922) was a physician, surgeon, and political figure in Nova Scotia, Canada. He represented Kings County in the Nova Scotia House of Assembly from 1911 to 1916 as a Liberal member.

Covert was born in 1870 at Musquash, New Brunswick to Reverend Walker Covert and Julie Harrington. He was educated at McGill University, earning a Doctor of Medicine in 1898. He married Minnie Clarke of Woodville, Nova Scotia. He served as a councillor for Ward IV in Kings County from 1899 to 1906 and for Ward I from 1906 to 1911. During the First World War, he served overseas with the Canadian Expeditionary Force as part of the Dalhousie No. 7 Stationary Hospital Unit from 1917 to 1919. Covert was appointed to the Legislative Council of Nova Scotia on May 17, 1917, serving until his death in 1922.

He was elected in the 1911 Nova Scotia general election and did not contest the 1916 Nova Scotia general election.
