= Charles Alexander Campbell =

Canadian politician from Nova Scotia (1855–1937)

Member of the Nova Scotia House of Assembly for Kings County
- In office June 20, 1906 – June 13, 1911

Personal details
- Born: October 3, 1855
- Died: May 3, 1937 (aged 81) Port Williams, Nova Scotia
- Party: Unity Reform
- Spouse: Emma M.
- Occupation: dry goods merchant, politician

Charles Alexander Campbell (October 3, 1855 – May 3, 1937) was a dry goods merchant and political figure in Nova Scotia, Canada. He represented Kings County in the Nova Scotia House of Assembly from 1906 to 1911 as an independent member.

Campbell was born in 1855 to Alexander Campbell and Ann Dexter. He was educated at Antigonish High School and married Emma M. He served as a municipal councillor for Kings County for nine years. Campbell was appointed to the Legislative Council of Nova Scotia on June 2, 1925, serving until its abolition on May 31, 1928. He died in 1937 at Port Williams, Nova Scotia.

Campbell was elected in the 1906 Nova Scotia general election, and was unsuccessful in both the 1911 and 1916 Nova Scotia general elections.
