= Ross Bragg =

Canadian politician (1956–1997)

MLA for Cumberland North
- In office 1993–1996
- Preceded by: new riding
- Succeeded by: Ernie Fage

MLA for Cumberland West
- In office 1988–1993
- Preceded by: Gardner Hurley
- Succeeded by: riding dissolved

Personal details
- Born: June 25, 1956 Amherst, Nova Scotia
- Died: March 31, 1997 (aged 40) Seattle, Washington
- Party: Liberal
- Occupation: Realtor

David Ross Bragg (June 25, 1956 – March 31, 1997) was a Canadian politician. He represented the electoral districts of Cumberland West and Cumberland North in the Nova Scotia House of Assembly from 1988 to 1996. He was a member of the Nova Scotia Liberal Party.

== Early life ==
Born in 1956 at Amherst, Nova Scotia, Bragg was a real estate broker by career.

== Political career ==
Bragg entered provincial politics in the 1988 election, defeating Progressive Conservative incumbent Gardner Hurley by 83 votes in the Cumberland West riding. He was re-elected in the 1993 election, defeating Progressive Conservative Ernie Fage by over 1200 votes in Cumberland North. On June 11, 1993, Bragg was appointed to the Executive Council of Nova Scotia as Minister of Economic Development. Bragg resigned from cabinet in February 1995. He remained MLA until resigning for health reasons in November 1996.

== Death ==
Bragg died on March 31, 1997, as a result of leukemia.
