= Caleb Rand Bill =

Canadian politician

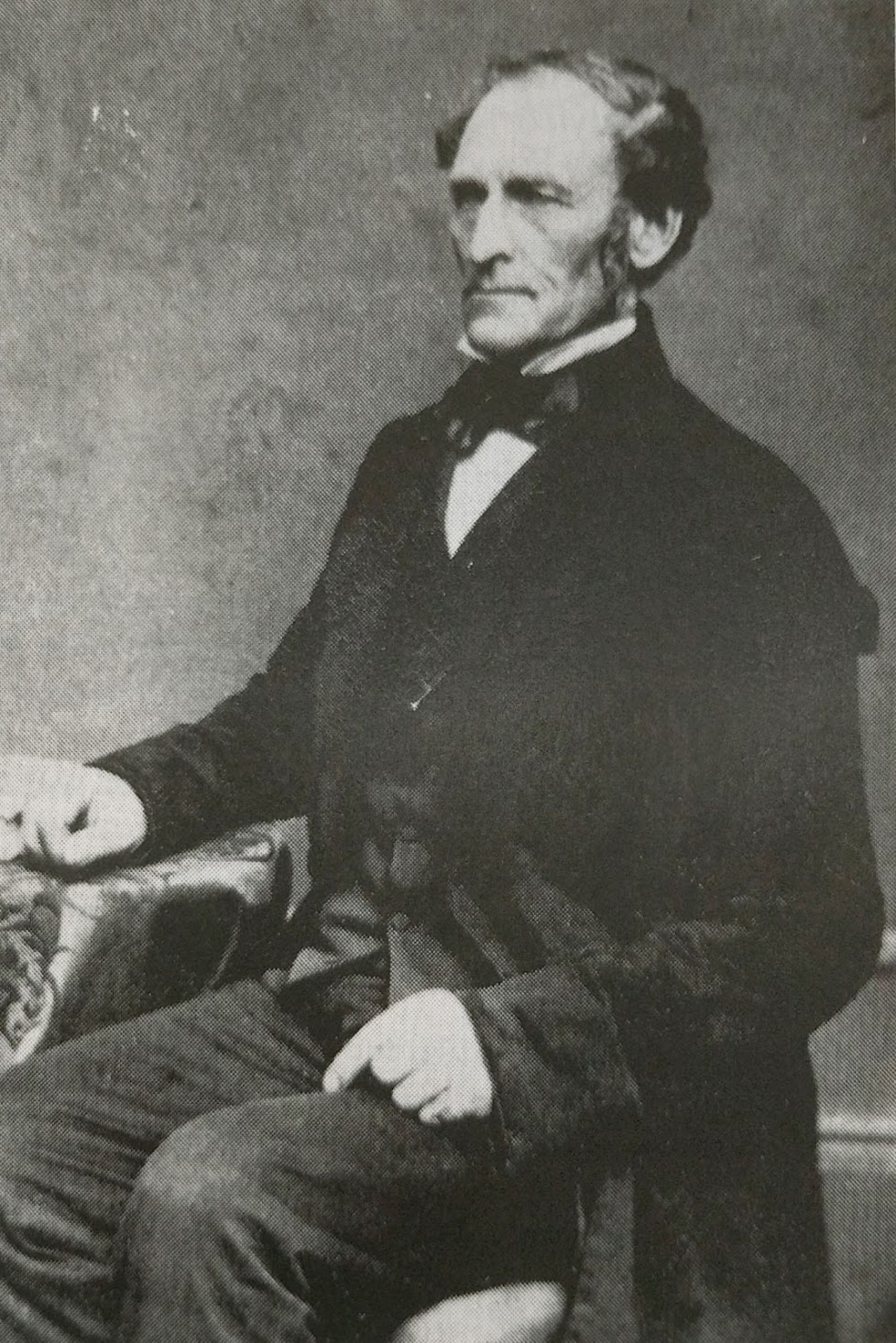
Senator C.R. Bill

Caleb Rand Bill (9 January 1806 – 1 February 1872) was a member of the Canadian Senate.

== Biography ==
Born in Billtown, Nova Scotia, a town founded by his ancestors, he was a farmer before entering politics. In 1828, he married Rebecca Cogswell. He represented Kings County from 1855 to 1859 and the northern region of Kings County from 1863 to 1867 in the Nova Scotia House of Assembly. A Liberal-Conservative, he was appointed to the Senate on 23 October 1867 by a royal proclamation of Queen Victoria following Canadian Confederation earlier that year. He represented the senatorial division of Nova Scotia until his death. He was also governor for Acadia College, president of the county agricultural society and a member of the school commission.

His son William served as a member of the Nova Scotia assembly.
