= Billtown, Nova Scotia =

Community in Nova Scotia, Canada

Billtown
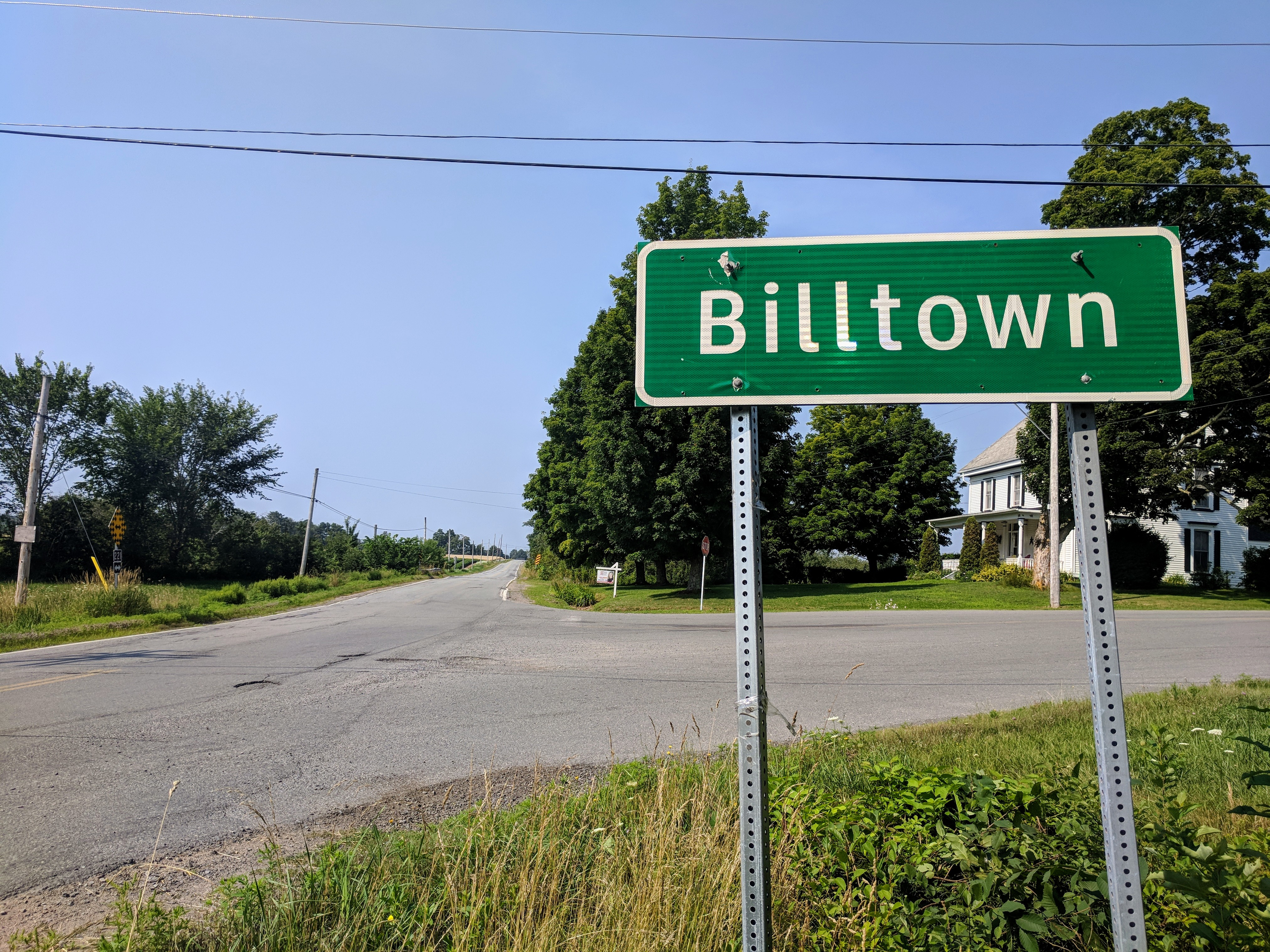
- Corner of 221 and Rockwell Mountain

- Location of Billtown, Nova Scotia
- Coordinates: 45°7′20.48″N 64°34′26.51″W
- Country: Canada
- Province: Nova Scotia
- County: Kings County
- Electoral Districts Federal: Kings-Hants
- Provincial: Kings North
- Elevation: 20 m (66 ft)
- Time zone: UTC-4 (AST)
  - Summer (DST): UTC-3 (ADT)
- Postal code(s): B0P 1J0
- Area code: 902

Billtown is a community in the Canadian province of Nova Scotia, located in Kings County.

== History ==
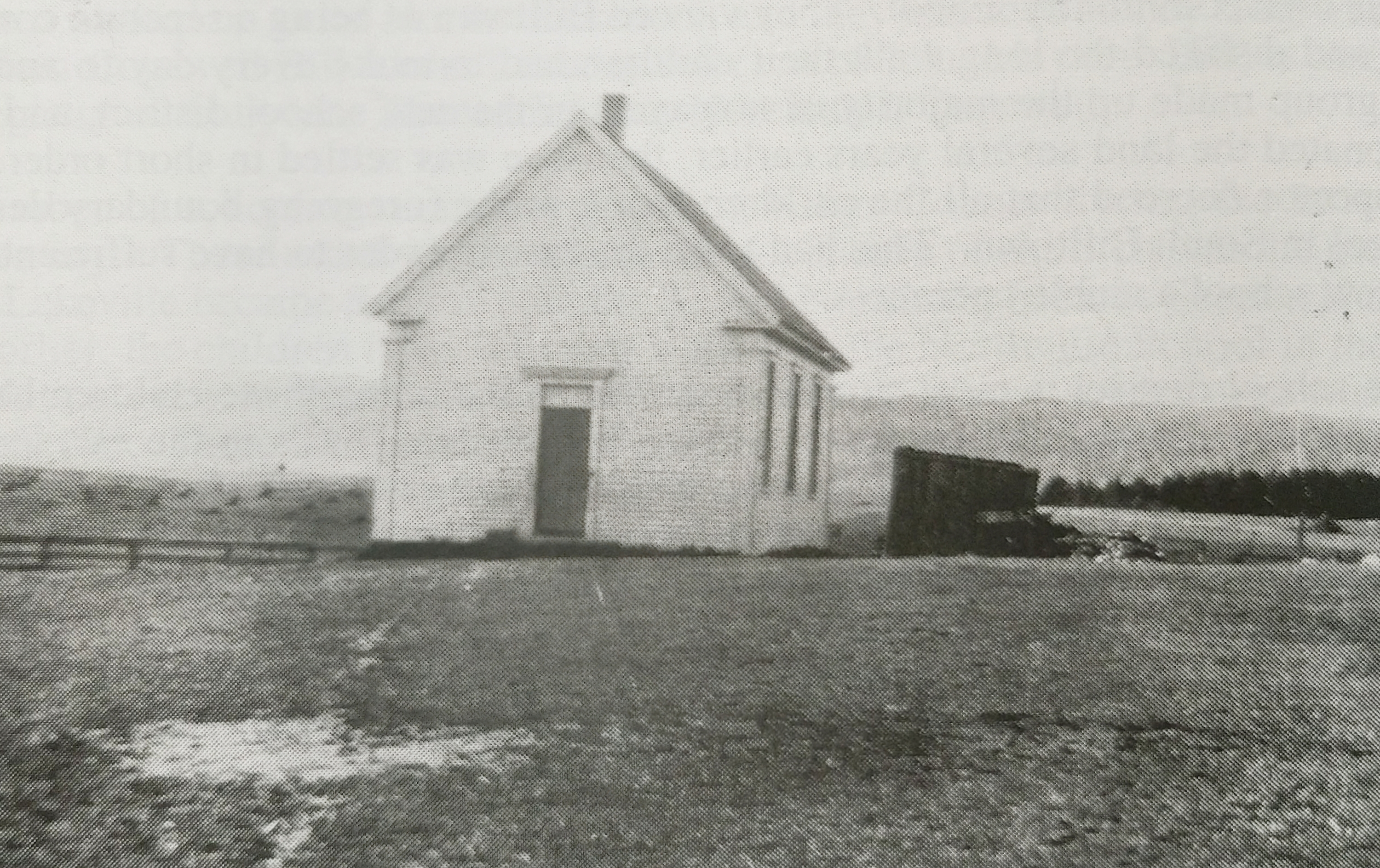
Billtown School in 1915

Ebenezer Bill, a New England Planter, was granted 1000 acres of land on July 21, 1761. According to the grant, a 78-acre plot in the centre of the property was intended to include a commercial area, a town hall, a school, and a church property. From 1829 to 1961 there were schools in Billtown. A community of properties which extended along the road that serviced the area developed. By the early 1900s this included a temperance hall, multiple general stores, a blacksmith, and two schools. On December 1, 1914, the 14.8 mile North Mountain Branch railroad was completed and the Billtown Train Station was opened. This station would continue to be used until 1961. Apple warehouses were built near the station. In the early 1920s telephone was introduced. In 1934 Electricity was brought to the community. As was typical of planter communities in the area, residences and homesteads to farms were built along the roads servicing the area and this type of community remains to today.

== Church ==
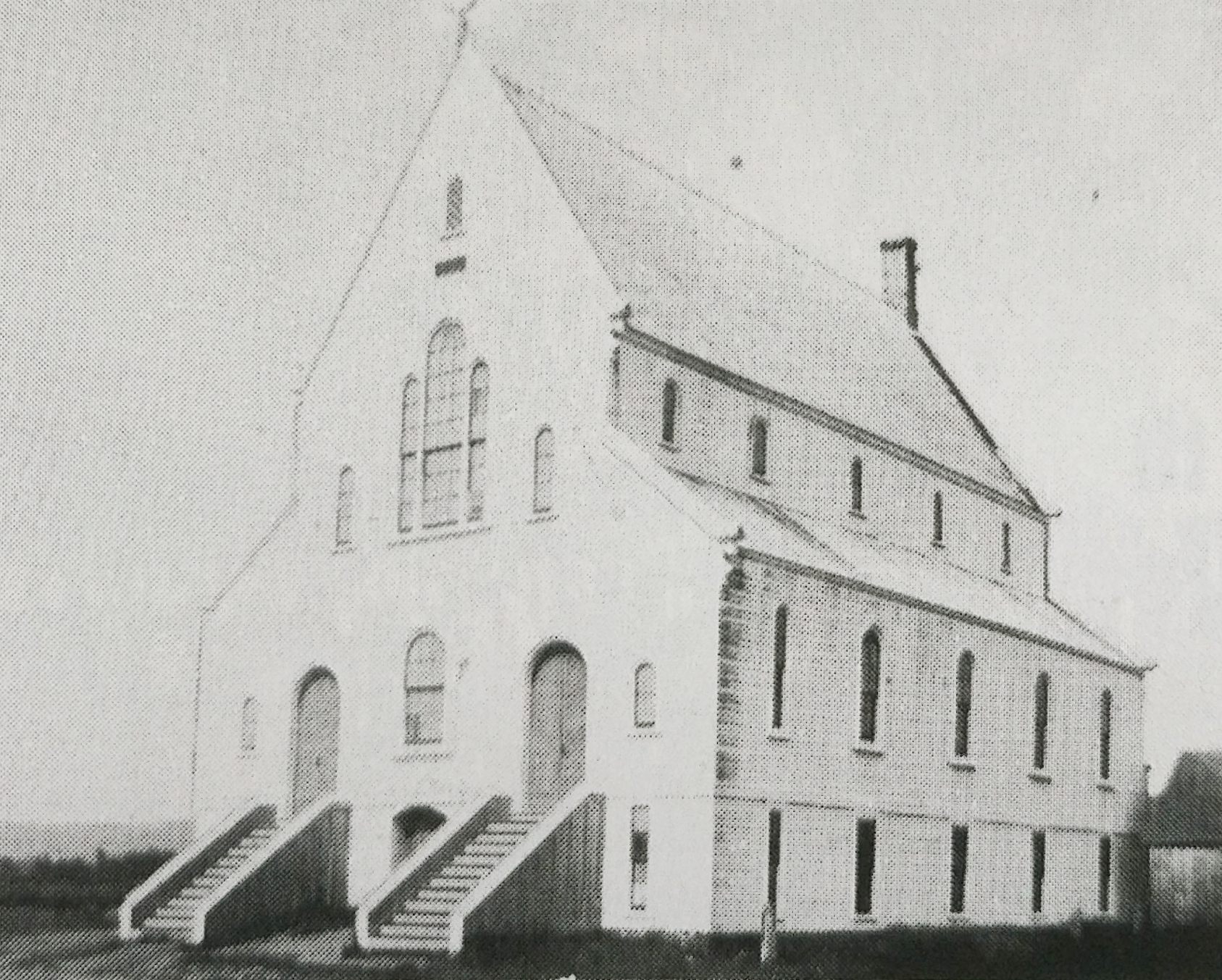
Second Billtown Church

The Cornwallis Church of Billtown's edifice was erected in 1822, was dedicated on August 10, 1823, and held its last service on April 6, 1872. A larger building had been erected for increasing membership and hosted its first service on April 14, 1872. In 1903 this church was torn down and construction began on a third building. On October 25, 1903, the Billtown Baptist Church was dedicated and is still used today.

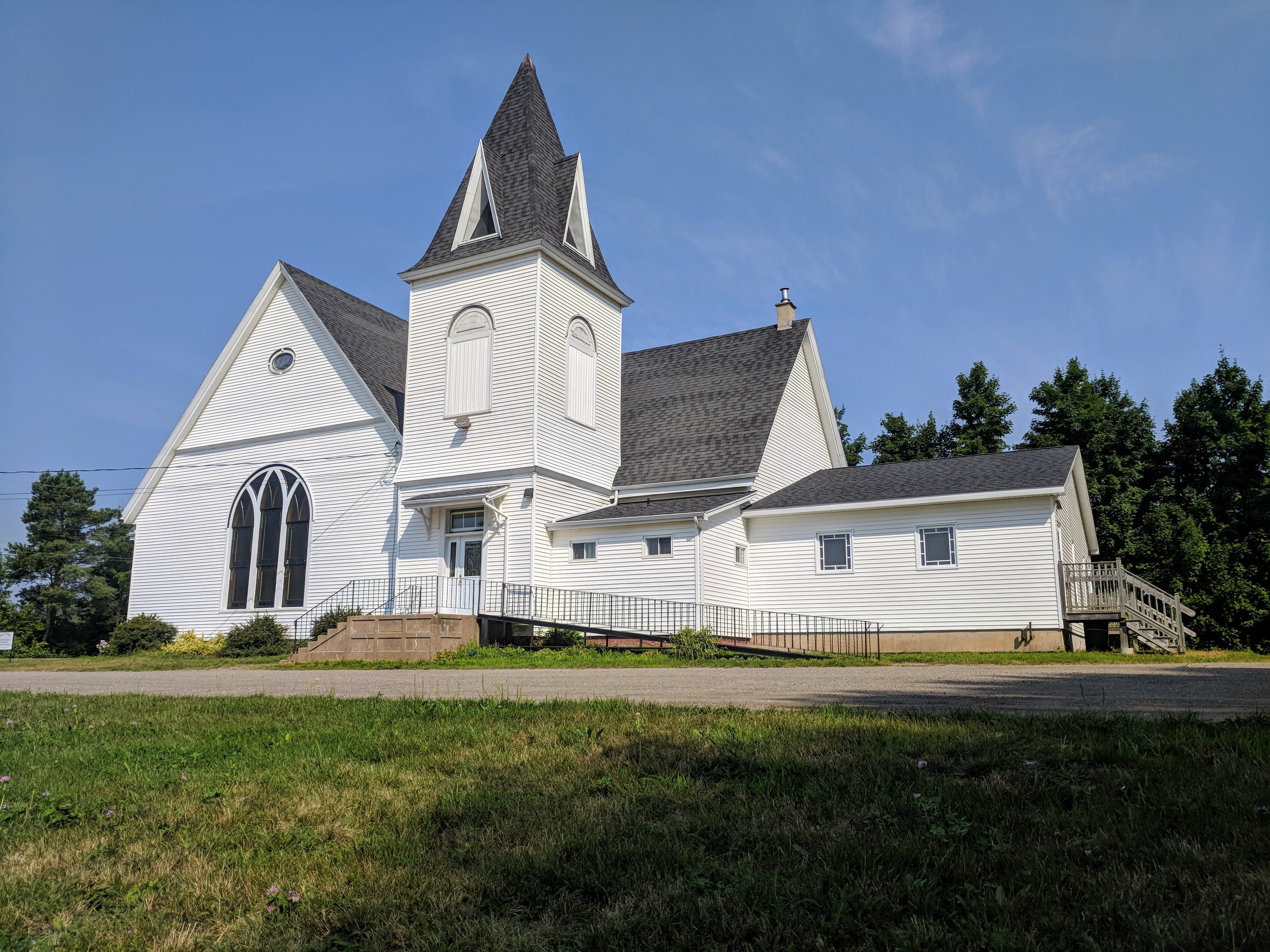
Current Billtown Baptist Church

== Industries ==
Agriculture, especially fruit crops such as strawberries and dairy farming are a prominent industry in Billtown.

== Community events ==
The Billtown Baptist Church hosts an annual Strawberry Supper.

== Notable residents ==
- Senator Caleb Rand Bill
- Political Figure William C. Bill

== Education ==
Education in the area is serviced by Aldershot Elementary in Kentville, serving grades primary through five, then high school at Northeast Kings Education Centre in Canning.
