= Cumberland West =

Former provincial electoral district in Nova Scotia, Canada

Nova Scotia electoral district

Defunct provincial electoral district
- Legislature: Nova Scotia House of Assembly
- District created: 1949
- District abolished: 1993
- Last contested: 1988

Cumberland West was a provincial electoral district in Nova Scotia, Canada, that elected one member to the Nova Scotia House of Assembly. It was formed in 1949 when Cumberland County was divided into three new districts, the other two being Cumberland Centre and Cumberland East. It existed until 1993, when it was redistributed to include all of Cumberland Centre and a portion of Cumberland East, at which point it was renamed Cumberland South.

== Members of the Legislative Assembly ==
Cumberland West elected the following members to the legislature:

Cumberland West
Legislature	Years	Member	Party
District created from Cumberland County (1867–1949)
44th	1949–1953	Thomas A. Giles	Progressive Conservative
45th	1953–1956	Allison T. Smith	Liberal
46th	1956–1960	Allison T. Smith	Liberal
47th	1960–1963	Allison T. Smith	Liberal
48th	1963–1967	D. L. George Henley	Progressive Conservative
49th	1967–1970	D. L. George Henley	Progressive Conservative
50th	1970–1974	D. L. George Henley	Progressive Conservative
51st	1974–1978	D. L. George Henley	Progressive Conservative
52nd	1978–1981	D. L. George Henley	Progressive Conservative
53rd	1981–1984	D. L. George Henley	Progressive Conservative
54th	1984–1988	Gardner Hurley	Progressive Conservative
55th	1988–1993	Ross Bragg	Liberal

== Election results ==
=== 1988 ===
1988 Nova Scotia general election
Party	Candidate	Votes	%	±%
Liberal	Ross Bragg	2,389	45.91%	7.75%
Progressive Conservative	Gardner Hurley	2,306	44.31%	-7.46%
New Democratic	Barbara Jack	509	9.78%	-0.29%
Total		5,204	–	
Source(s) Source: Nova Scotia Legislature (2024). "Electoral History for Cumberland West" (PDF). nslegislature.ca. Nova Scotia, Chief Electoral Officer (1988). Returns of the General Election for the House of Assembly, Thirty-Second General Election (PDF) (Report). Queen's Printer. Archived from the original (PDF) on 7 July 2018.

=== 1984 ===
1984 Nova Scotia general election
Party	Candidate	Votes	%	±%
Progressive Conservative	Gardner Hurley	2,503	51.77%	-2.35%
Liberal	Gary Gordon	1,845	38.16%	4.31%
New Democratic	Alexander Graham	487	10.07%	-1.95%
Total		4,835	–	
Source(s) Source: Nova Scotia Legislature (2024). "Electoral History for Cumberland West" (PDF). nslegislature.ca. Nova Scotia, Chief Electoral Officer (1984). Returns of the General Election for the House of Assembly, Thirty-First General Election (PDF) (Report). Queen's Printer. Archived from the original (PDF) on 31 July 2017.

=== 1981 ===
1981 Nova Scotia general election
Party	Candidate	Votes	%	±%
Progressive Conservative	D. L. George Henley	2,745	54.12%	3.89%
Liberal	Bartley Babineau	1,717	33.85%	-9.87%
New Democratic	Douglas Meekins	610	12.03%	5.98%
Total		5,072	–	
Source(s) Source: Nova Scotia Legislature (2024). "Electoral History for Cumberland West" (PDF). nslegislature.ca. Nova Scotia, Chief Electoral Officer (1981). Returns of the General Election for the House of Assembly, Thirtieth General Election (PDF) (Report). Queen's Printer. Archived from the original (PDF) on 31 July 2017.

=== 1978 ===
1978 Nova Scotia general election
Party	Candidate	Votes	%	±%
Progressive Conservative	D. L. George Henley	2,633	50.23%	1.91%
Liberal	Duncan Lake	2,292	43.72%	-2.14%
New Democratic	John S. Edgecombe	317	6.05%	0.22%
Total		5,242	–	
Source(s) Source: Nova Scotia Legislature (2024). "Electoral History for Cumberland West" (PDF). nslegislature.ca. Nova Scotia, Chief Electoral Officer (1978). Returns of the General Election for the House of Assembly, Twenty-Ninth General Election (PDF) (Report). Queen's Printer. Archived from the original (PDF) on 18 June 2018.

=== 1974 ===
1974 Nova Scotia general election
Party	Candidate	Votes	%	±%
Progressive Conservative	D. L. George Henley	2,323	48.32%	-9.03%
Liberal	W. J. (Bill) Brown	2,205	45.86%	3.21%
New Democratic	A. Bradley Colpitts	280	5.82%	–
Total		4,808	–	
Source(s) Source: Nova Scotia Legislature (2024). "Electoral History for Cumberland West" (PDF). nslegislature.ca. Nova Scotia, Chief Electoral Officer (1974). Returns of the General Election for the House of Assembly, Twenty-Eighth General Election (PDF) (Report). Queen's Printer. Archived from the original (PDF) on 18 June 2018.

=== 1970 ===
1970 Nova Scotia general election
Party	Candidate	Votes	%	±%
Progressive Conservative	D. L. George Henley	2,458	57.35%	-0.46%
Liberal	Thomas H. Tonner	1,828	42.65%	3.48%
Total		4,286	–	
Source(s) Source: Nova Scotia Legislature (2024). "Electoral History for Cumberland West" (PDF). nslegislature.ca. Nova Scotia, Legislative Assembly (1970). Returns of the General Election for the House of Assembly, 1970 (PDF) (Report). Queen's Printer. Archived from the original (PDF) on 25 July 2018.

=== 1967 ===
1967 Nova Scotia general election
Party	Candidate	Votes	%	±%
Progressive Conservative	D. L. George Henley	2,506	57.81%	3.78%
Liberal	Ruth Fullerton	1,698	39.17%	-6.80%
New Democratic	Shirley Spicer	131	3.02%	–
Total		4,335	–	
Source(s) Source: Nova Scotia Legislature (2024). "Electoral History for Cumberland West" (PDF). nslegislature.ca. Nova Scotia Legislature (1967). Returns of the General Election for the House of Assembly (PDF) (Report). Queen's Printer. Archived from the original (PDF) on 25 July 2018.

=== 1963 ===
1963 Nova Scotia general election
Party	Candidate	Votes	%	±%
Progressive Conservative	D. L. George Henley	2,515	54.03%	8.24%
Liberal	Allison T. Smith	2,140	45.97%	-3.92%
Total		4,655	–	
Source(s) Source: Nova Scotia Legislature (2024). "Electoral History for Cumberland West" (PDF). nslegislature.ca. Nova Scotia Legislature (1963). Returns of the General Election for the House of Assembly (PDF) (Report). Queen's Printer. Archived from the original (PDF) on 25 July 2018.

=== 1960 ===
1960 Nova Scotia general election
Party	Candidate	Votes	%	±%
Liberal	Allison T. Smith	2,418	49.90%	-4.92%
Progressive Conservative	George Percy Graham	2,219	45.79%	0.61%
Co-operative Commonwealth	Thomas Alton Johnstone	209	4.31%	–
Total		4,846	–	
Source(s) Source: Nova Scotia Legislature (2024). "Electoral History for Cumberland West" (PDF). nslegislature.ca. Nova Scotia Legislature (1960). Returns of the General Election for the House of Assembly (PDF) (Report). Queen's Printer. Archived from the original (PDF) on 25 July 2018.

=== 1956 ===
1956 Nova Scotia general election
Party	Candidate	Votes	%	±%
Liberal	Allison T. Smith	2,618	54.82%	0.26%
Progressive Conservative	William Harmon Wasson	2,158	45.18%	-0.26%
Total		4,776	–	
Source(s) Source: Nova Scotia Legislature (2024). "Electoral History for Cumberland West" (PDF). nslegislature.ca. Nova Scotia Legislature (1956). Returns of the General Election for the House of Assembly (PDF) (Report). Queen's Printer. Archived from the original (PDF) on 10 September 2018.

=== 1953 ===
1953 Nova Scotia general election
Party	Candidate	Votes	%	±%
Liberal	Allison T. Smith	2,799	54.55%	6.17%
Progressive Conservative	Thomas A. Giles	2,332	45.45%	-6.17%
Total		5,131	–	
Source(s) Source: Nova Scotia Legislature (2024). "Electoral History for Cumberland West" (PDF). nslegislature.ca. Nova Scotia Legislature (1953). Returns of the General Election for the House of Assembly (PDF) (Report). Queen's Printer. Archived from the original (PDF) on 10 September 2018.

=== 1949 ===
1949 Nova Scotia general election
Party	Candidate	Votes	%	±%
Progressive Conservative	Thomas A. Giles	2,822	51.62%	–
Liberal	Kenneth Judson Cochrane	2,645	48.38%	–
Total		5,467	–	
Source(s) Source: Nova Scotia Legislature (2024). "Electoral History for Cumberland West" (PDF). nslegislature.ca. Nova Scotia Legislature (1949). Returns of the General Election for the House of Assembly (PDF) (Report). Queen's Printer. Archived from the original (PDF) on 10 September 2018.

== See also ==
- List of Nova Scotia provincial electoral districts
- Canadian provincial electoral districts
