= John Alexander McDonald (politician) =

Canadian politician

John Alexander Hamilton (September 24, 1889 – April 16, 1962) was a farmer and political figure in Nova Scotia, Canada. He represented Kings County in the Nova Scotia House of Assembly from 1920 to 1925, and again from 1933 to 1945 as a Liberal member. McDonald sat for King's division in the Senate of Canada from 1945 to 1962.

== Career ==
McDonald was minister without portfolio from 1923 to 1925 and Minister of Agriculture from 1933 to 1945 in the province's Executive Council. He was defeated when he ran for reelection to the provincial assembly in 1925.

== Family ==
He was born in Upper Dyke Village, Nova Scotia, the son of Andrew S. McDonald and Clara Kidston. McDonald was educated at the Kentville Academy and Acadia University. In 1912, he married Marguerite Taylor.
