= Reginald Tucker Caldwell =

Canadian politician (1885–1939)

Reginald Tucker Caldwell (June 11, 1885 – March 2, 1939) was a grocer, real estate broker and political figure in Nova Scotia, Canada. He represented Kings County in the Nova Scotia House of Assembly from 1925 to 1933 as a Conservative member.

He was born in Berwick, Nova Scotia, the son of Rupert Caldwell and Eva Crowe. Caldwell was educated at a business college in Truro. In 1912, he married Winnifred Newcombe. Calwell served on the Kentville town council. He was a member of the Nova Scotia Board of Censors from 1933 to 1939. Caldwell died in a hotel fire in Halifax at the age of 53.
