= Thomas A. Giles =

Canadian politician

MLA for Cumberland West
- In office 1949–1953
- Preceded by: new riding
- Succeeded by: Allison T. Smith

Personal details
- Born: November 23, 1916 Victoria, Nova Scotia
- Died: October 23, 1970 (aged 53) Antigonish, Nova Scotia
- Party: Progressive Conservative
- Occupation: lawyer

Thomas Augustine Giles (November 23, 1916 – October 23, 1970) was a Canadian politician. He represented the electoral district of Cumberland West in the Nova Scotia House of Assembly from 1949 to 1953. He was a member of the Progressive Conservative Party of Nova Scotia.

Born in 1916 at Victoria, Cumberland County, Nova Scotia, Giles graduated from St. Francis Xavier University and Dalhousie University, and was a lawyer by career. He married Joan Edwards of Salisbury, England in 1945, and then Sylvia Bowser of Sussex, New Brunswick. Giles entered provincial politics in the 1949 election, defeating Liberal incumbent Kenneth Judson Cochrane by 177 votes in the newly established Cumberland West riding. He was defeated by Liberal Allison T. Smith when he ran for re-election in 1953. In 1967, Giles was appointed a judge of the Provincial Magistrate's Court. He died at Antigonish on October 23, 1970.
