= Thomas Lewis Dodge =

Canadian politician (1816–1893)

Thomas Lewis Dodge (July 19, 1816 – November 2, 1893) was a merchant and political figure in Nova Scotia, Canada. He represented King's County in the Nova Scotia House of Assembly from 1882 to 1886 as a Liberal member.

He was born in Horton, Nova Scotia, the son of David Dodge and Phebe Scott. In 1843, he married Sarah Harrington. Dodge married Harriet Amy Harrington in 1856. He was named to the province's Legislative Council in 1887. Dodge served as treasurer for King's County from 1870 until his death at home in Kentville at the age of 77.

His son Brenton Haliburton served in the provincial assembly and was mayor of Kentville.
