= Brenton Dodge =

Canadian politician (1847–1910)

Brenton Haliburton Dodge (March 4, 1847 – December 30, 1910) was a merchant and political figure in Nova Scotia, Canada. He represented King's County in the Nova Scotia House of Assembly from 1894 to 1910 as a Liberal member.

He was the son of Thomas Lewis Dodge and Sarah Harrington. Dodge married the widow Annie M. Lydiard (née Harrington). He served as treasurer for Kings County in 1893 and 1894. Dodge also served as mayor of Kentville. He died in office in Kentville at the age of 63.
