= Hunts Point, Nova Scotia =

Community in Nova Scotia, Canada

Coordinates: 43°57′8″N 64°47′7″W

Hunts Point in Nova Scotia

Hunts Point is a community in the Canadian province of Nova Scotia, located in the Region of Queens Municipality.
