= Shirley Elliott =

Canadian librarian (1916–2004)

Shirley Elliott ONS
- Born: Shirley Burnham Elliott; 1916
- Died: 2004 (aged 87–88)
- Occupations: Librarian; historian
- Known for: Legislative librarian of Nova Scotia from 1954–1982
- Awards: Order of Nova Scotia

Shirley Burnham Elliott ONS (1916 – 2004) was a Canadian librarian and historian from Nova Scotia. She was the legislative librarian of Nova Scotia from 1954 to 1982, and in 2003 was awarded the Order of Nova Scotia in recognition of her efforts.

== Early life and education ==
Shirley Elliott was born in 1916 to parents Malcolm and Jean Elliott. She graduated with a Bachelor of Arts from Acadia University in 1937, followed by a Master of Arts in 1939. She received her library education from the Simmons College in Boston, graduating in 1940.

Elliott was active in sports while attending school. Her basketball team at Acadia won the Maritime intercollegiate women's basketball title in 1936 and 1937. She was also an accomplished tennis player, and served as president of the Acadia Girls' Amateur Athletic Association during her senior year at the university.

== Career ==
After graduating from Simmons College, Elliott worked as a reference assistant at the Brookline Public Library in Massachusetts between 1940 and 1946. She subsequently worked at the Rhode Island State College as an assistant librarian between 1946 and 1948.

Elliott served as the legislative librarian of Nova Scotia from 1954 to 1982. During this time, she worked to catalogue and preserve the materials at Province House and directed efforts to modernize the legislative library. After Elliott retired, she returned to Wolfville and helped to establish the Wolfville Memorial Library in the town's former train station.

She was a contributor to the Dictionary of Canadian Biography, and wrote a variety of books and articles concerning Nova Scotia across her career.

== Recognition ==
Elliott received honorary degrees from Acadia University and Dalhousie University. She was awarded the Order of Nova Scotia in 2003 in recognition of her efforts as legislative librarian.

== Publications ==
=== Books ===
- Elliott, Shirley B. (1979). Nova Scotia Book of Days: A Calendar of the Provinces's History. Halifax, N.S.: Nova Scotia Communications & Information Centre. ISBN 978-0-8887-1012-3.
- — (1984). The Legislative Assembly of Nova Scotia, 1758–1983: A Biographical Directory. Halifax, N.S.: Public Archives of Nova Scotia. ISBN 978-0-8887-1050-5.
- — (1986). Nova Scotia in Books: A Quarter Century's Gatherings, 1957–1982. Education Resource Services. Halifax, N.S.: Nova Scotia Department of Education. ISBN 978-0-8887-1088-8.
- — (1988). Nova Scotia in London: A History of its Agents General, 1762–1988. London: Office of the Agent General of Nova Scotia. ISBN 978-0-9693-6390-3.

=== Books as editor ===
- Elliott, Shirley B., ed. (1960). Atlantic Provinces Checklist. Vol. 3. Halifax, N.S.: Atlantic Provinces Library Association. Atlantic Provinces Economic Council.

=== Articles ===
- Elliott, Shirley B. (1984). "An Historical Review of Nova Scotia Legal Literature: a select bibliography". DLJ. 8 (3). Halifax, N.S.: Dalhousie University.
