= George Arthur Boggs =

Canadian politician

MLA for Kings County
- In office 1953–1956
- Preceded by: William H. Pipe; David Durell Sutton
- Succeeded by: riding dissolved

Personal details
- Born: August 9, 1891 Chicago, Illinois
- Died: November 9, 1968 (aged 77) Halifax, Nova Scotia
- Party: Progressive Conservative
- Occupation: fruit grower

George Arthur Boggs (August 9, 1891 – November 9, 1968) was a Canadian politician. He represented the electoral district of Kings County in the Nova Scotia House of Assembly from 1953 to 1956. He was a member of the Progressive Conservative Party of Nova Scotia.

Born in 1891 at Chicago, Illinois, Boggs was educated at Dartmouth College, and Magdalen College, Oxford. He married Evelyn Starr, who died in 1923 and then Helen Pipon Starr in February 1925. A fruit grower by career, Boggs moved to Nova Scotia in 1925. He served as president of the Nova Scotia Fruit Growers' Association, and warden of St. John's Anglican Church, Wolfville. Boggs entered provincial politics in 1953, when he was elected in the dual-member riding of Kings County with Progressive Conservative Edward Haliburton. In the 1956 election, Boggs was defeated when he ran for re-election in the newly established Kings North riding, losing to Liberal Eric Balcom by 45 votes. Boggs died at Halifax, Nova Scotia on November 9, 1968.
