= Edward Haliburton =

Canadian politician

Edward D. Haliburton

MLA for Kings South
- In office 1956–1970
- Preceded by: new riding
- Succeeded by: Harry How

MLA for Kings County
- In office 1953–1956
- Preceded by: William H. Pipe; David Durell Sutton
- Succeeded by: riding dissolved

Personal details
- Born: March 28, 1898 St. John's, Newfoundland
- Died: March 12, 1990 (aged 91) Halifax, Nova Scotia
- Party: Progressive Conservative
- Occupation: farmer, journalist

Edward Douglas Haliburton (March 28, 1898 – March 12, 1990) was a Canadian politician. He represented the electoral districts of Kings County and Kings South in the Nova Scotia House of Assembly from 1953 to 1970. He was a member of the Progressive Conservative Party of Nova Scotia.

Born in 1898 at St. John's, Newfoundland, Haliburton was educated at Dalhousie University, and University of King's College. He married Louella Jean Tattrie in March 1926. By career, Haliburton was a farmer, fruit grower, and journalist.

Haliburton first attempted to enter provincial politics in the 1949 election, but was defeated by 184 votes. He ran again in the 1953 election, and was elected in the dual-member riding of Kings County with Progressive Conservative George Arthur Boggs. In the 1956 election, Haliburton was re-elected in the new Kings South riding by 774 votes. In November 1956, Haliburton was appointed to the Executive Council of Nova Scotia as Minister of Agriculture and Marketing. In July 1959, he was given an additional role in cabinet as Minister of Lands and Forests. Haliburton was re-elected in the 1960, and 1963 elections. In July 1964, Haliburton was moved to Minister of Fisheries, while remaining as Minister of Lands and Forests. He was re-elected in the 1967 election. When George Isaac Smith was sworn in as premier in September 1967, Haliburton retained his previous cabinet roles, but was also named Minister of Education. In May 1968, Smith shuffled his cabinet, moving Haliburton to Provincial Secretary. He did not reoffer in the 1970 election.

Haliburton died at Halifax on March 12, 1990.
