= Charles H. Reardon =

Canadian politician

MLA for Halifax West
- In office 1956–1963

Personal details
- Born: January 2, 1916 Halifax, Nova Scotia
- Died: October 13, 1986 (aged 70) Halifax, Nova Scotia
- Party: Liberal
- Occupation: doctor

Charles Henry Reardon (January 2, 1916 – October 13, 1986) was a Canadian politician. He represented the electoral district of Halifax West in the Nova Scotia House of Assembly from 1956 to 1963. He is a member of the Nova Scotia Liberal Party. Reardon was born in Halifax, Nova Scotia. He was a doctor, having received his medical degree at Dalhousie University.

On May 15, 1942, he married Barbara Evelyn McArel. He died on October 13, 1986, at a hospital in Halifax.
