= Allison T. Smith =

Canadian politician (1902–1970)

MLA for Cumberland West
- In office 1953–1963
- Preceded by: Thomas A. Giles
- Succeeded by: D. L. George Henley

Personal details
- Born: Allison Thompson Smith; June 20, 1902 Parrsboro, Nova Scotia, Canada
- Died: February 8, 1970 (aged 67) Truro, Nova Scotia, Canada
- Party: Nova Scotia Liberal Party
- Occupation: Funeral director

Allison Thompson Smith (June 20, 1902 – February 8, 1970) was a Canadian politician. He represented the electoral district of Cumberland West in the Nova Scotia House of Assembly from 1953 to 1963. He was a member of the Nova Scotia Liberal Party.

Born in 1902 at Parrsboro, Nova Scotia, Smith was a funeral director. He was president of S.W. Smith & Son from 1935. He married Mildred Wilson. Smith entered provincial politics in the 1953 election, defeating Progressive Conservative incumbent Thomas Augustine Giles in Cumberland West. He was re-elected in the 1956 and 1960 elections. Smith was defeated by Progressive Conservative D. L. George Henley when he ran for re-election in 1963. Smith died at Truro, Nova Scotia, on February 8, 1970.
