= David Russell Sutton =

Canadian politician

MLA for Kings County
- In office 1945–1953
- Preceded by: John A. McDonald
- Succeeded by: Edward Haliburton; George Arthur Boggs

Personal details
- Born: November 2, 1895 Somerville, Massachusetts
- Died: February 13, 1970 (aged 74)
- Party: Nova Scotia Liberal Party
- Occupation: farmer, fruit grower

David Russell Sutton (November 2, 1895 – February 13, 1970) was a Canadian politician. He represented the electoral district of Kings in the Nova Scotia House of Assembly from 1945 to 1953. He was a member of the Nova Scotia Liberal Party.

Born in 1895 at Somerville, Massachusetts, Sutton's family moved to Canada in 1896. He was educated at the Nova Scotia Agricultural College, and was a farmer and fruit grower in Kings County, Nova Scotia. He married Lulu Marguerite Morine in 1919. Sutton was a municipal councillor in Kings County, and served as president of the Nova Scotia Fruit Growers Association.

Sutton entered provincial politics in the 1945 election, winning the Kings County riding. He was re-elected in the now dual-member Kings County riding in 1949, serving with Liberal William Harvey Pipe. In the 1953 election, both Sutton and Pipe were defeated by Progressive Conservatives Edward Haliburton, and George Arthur Boggs. Sutton died on February 13, 1970.
