= Barclay Webster =

Canadian politician

MLA for King's County
- In office 1890–1894

Personal details
- Born: September 16, 1849 Kentville, Nova Scotia
- Died: February 14, 1928 (aged 78) Kentville, Nova Scotia
- Party: Liberal-Conservative
- Profession: lawyer, judge

Barclay Webster (September 16, 1849 – February 14, 1928) was a lawyer, judge, and political figure in Nova Scotia, Canada. He represented King's County in the Nova Scotia House of Assembly from 1890 to 1894 as a Liberal-Conservative member.

He was born in Kentville, Nova Scotia, the son of Henry Bentley Webster, a lawyer, and Mary Ina Barclay. Webster was educated at Acadia College, Dalhousie University and Harvard University. He was called to the Nova Scotia bar in 1872 and set up practice in Kentville. He married Ethel, the daughter of Leverett de Veber Chipman, in 1877. In 1890, Webster was named King's Counsel. Barclay Webster died in Kentville in 1928 of heart failure.

His son L. Beverley Webster died in London on 22 Mar 1902 after fighting in the Second Boer War and is memorialized on the South African War Memorial (Halifax).

== Sources ==
- Allison, David; Tuck, C.E. (1916). History of Nova Scotia. Vol. III. Halifax: A.W. Bowen & Co. p. 205.
- Elliott, Shirley B., ed. (1984). The Legislative Assembly of Nova Scotia 1758-1983: a biographical directory (PDF). Province of Nova Scotia. p. 229. ISBN 0-88871-050-X.
