= Thomas R. Harris =

Canadian politician (1836–1894)

Thomas Rees Harris (March 24, 1836 – 1894) was a political figure in Nova Scotia, Canada. He represented Kings County in the Nova Scotia House of Assembly from 1882 to 1886 as a Conservative member.

== Biography ==
Harris was born in Aylesford, Nova Scotia, the son of Elisha D. Harris and Elizabeth Ann Rees. In 1864, he married Annie J. Fanscarth. Harris was a captain in the militia, a school commissioner and served on the county council.

In 1864, he was named postmaster for Aylesford, later resigning when he ran for a seat in the assembly. Harris was also a prominent Freemason.
