= William C. Bill =

Canadian politician

William Cogswell Bill (January 10, 1828 – May 13, 1903) was a farmer, conveyancer and political figure in Nova Scotia, Canada. He represented Kings County in the Nova Scotia House of Assembly from 1878 to 1882 and from 1886 to 1890 as a Conservative member.

He was born in Billtown, Nova Scotia, the son of Caleb Rand Bill and Rebecca Cogswell, and educated at the Horton Academy in Wolfville. In 1853, he married Ethelinda A. Dodge; after his first wife's death, he married her sister Arabella in 1864. Bill was also a justice of the peace. He was defeated when he ran for reelection in 1882.
