= Ronald Manning Fielding =

Canadian politician

MLA for Halifax Northwest
- In office 1956–1960
- Preceded by: new riding
- Succeeded by: Gordon H. Fitzgerald

MLA for Halifax West
- In office 1941–1956
- Preceded by: George E. Hagen
- Succeeded by: Charles H. Reardon

Personal details
- Born: October 7, 1896 Rockingham, Nova Scotia
- Died: March 1, 1972 (aged 75) St. Petersburg, Florida
- Party: Nova Scotia Liberal Party
- Occupation: lawyer

Ronald Manning Fielding (October 7, 1896 – March 1, 1972) was a Canadian politician. He represented the electoral districts of Halifax West and Halifax Northwest in the Nova Scotia House of Assembly from 1941 to 1960. He was a member of the Nova Scotia Liberal Party.

Fielding was born in 1896 at Rockingham, Nova Scotia. He was educated at Dalhousie University, and was a lawyer by career. He was a municipal solicitor from 1931–1948, and a county prosecutor from 1933–1946. He married Marion Leck in 1945.

Fielding entered provincial politics in the 1941 election, winning the Halifax West riding. He was re-elected in the 1945 and 1949 elections. In December 1949, Fielding was appointed to the Executive Council of Nova Scotia as Minister of Municipal Affairs. Fielding was re-elected in the 1953 election. In January 1954, Fielding was given an additional role in cabinet as Provincial Treasurer. In June 1956, he was named Minister of Education. In the 1956 election, Fielding was re-elected in the newly established Halifax Northwest riding. Fielding was defeated when he ran for re-election in 1960, losing his seat by 27 votes to Progressive Conservative Gordon H. Fitzgerald.

In 1965, Fielding was appointed to the Nova Scotia Supreme Court, serving until his retirement in 1968. He died at St. Petersburg, Florida on March 1, 1972.
