= Leander Rand =

Canadian politician and farmer

Leander Rand (October 7, 1827 – February 12, 1900) was a farmer and political figure in Nova Scotia, Canada. He represented King's County in the Nova Scotia House of Assembly from 1886 to 1890 as a Liberal member.

He was born in Canning, Nova Scotia, the son of Stephen Strong Rand and Nancy Forsyth. In 1851, Rand married Olivia Ann Borden. He was a major in the local militia and also served on the municipal council for King's County.
