= Archibald J. Mason =

Canadian politician

Archibald Joseph Mason (February 9, 1889 – November 16, 1974) was a theatre owner and political figure in Nova Scotia, Canada. He represented Cumberland Centre in the Nova Scotia House of Assembly from 1950 to 1953 as a Liberal member.

He was born in Birmingham, England, the son of Joseph I. Mason and Isabella Laugher. Mason came to Canada with his family in 1902. In 1908, he married Ethel Morris. Mason was president of the Maritimes Motion Picture Exhibitors Association. He served as mayor of Springhill from 1942 to 1953. He was an unsuccessful candidate for a seat in the provincial assembly in 1937 and 1941 and for a federal seat in 1945.
