= Alexander O'Handley =

Canadian politician

Alexander O'Handley (May 16, 1899 – January 8, 1974) was a teacher, lawyer and political figure in Nova Scotia, Canada. He represented Cape Breton East from 1925 to 1928 as a Conservative member and Cape Breton North from 1941 to 1956 as a Liberal member in the Nova Scotia House of Assembly.

He was born in Sydney Mines, Nova Scotia, the son of John O'Handley and Catherine McIntyre. He was educated at St. Francis Xavier University and later Dalhousie University, receiving an LL.B in 1931. O'Handley taught school for a number of years and was the president of the Nova Scotia Teachers' Union from 1924 to 1925. In 1941, he married Bernette O'Neill.
