= James Edward Rutledge =

Canadian politician (1889–1966)

James Edward Rutledge (August 14, 1889 – August 15, 1966) was a lawyer and political figure in Nova Scotia, Canada. He represented Halifax County in the Nova Scotia House of Assembly from 1939 to 1956 as a Liberal member.

He was born in Sheet Harbour, Halifax County, Nova Scotia, the son of Alexander Cameron Rutledge and Ada Stewart Hartling. He was educated at Dalhousie University. He served as a lieutenant in the Canadian Expeditionary Force during World War I. In 1917, Rutledge married Minnie Etoile Silver. He was named King's Counsel in 1932. He was first elected to the provincial assembly in a 1939 by-election held after the death of William Duff Forrest. Rutledge wrote Sheet Harbour: A local history, published in 1954. Rutledge died at Halifax on August 15, 1966.
