= 62nd General Assembly of Nova Scotia =

2013–2017 House of Assembly session

- Majority parliament
- Oct. 24, 2013 – Apr. 30, 2017

Parliament leaders
- Premier: Stephen McNeil; October 22, 2013
- Leader of the Opposition: Jamie Baillie; October 22, 2013

Party caucuses
- Government: Liberal Party
- Opposition: Progressive Conservative Party
- Recognized: New Democratic Party

House of Assembly
- Speaker of the House: Kevin Murphy; October 24, 2013
- Government House leader: Michel Samson; October 24, 2013 – April 30, 2017
- Opposition House leader: Chris d'Entremont; October 24, 2013
- Members: 51 MLA seats

Sovereign
- Monarch: Elizabeth II; February 6, 1952
- Lieutenant governor: John James Grant; April 12, 2012

Sessions
- 1st session October 24, 2013 – September 25, 2014
- 2nd session September 25, 2014 – October 13, 2016
- 3rd session October 13, 2016 – April 30, 2017
← 61st	→ 63rd

62nd General Assembly of Nova Scotia was the assembly of the Nova Scotia House of Assembly that was determined in the 2013 Nova Scotia election. The assembly opened on October 24, 2013 and was dissolved April 30, 2017.

== List of members ==
Riding	Member	Party	First elected / previously elected	Notes
Annapolis	Stephen McNeil	Liberal	2003	
Antigonish	Randy Delorey	Liberal	2013	
Argyle-Barrington	Chris d'Entremont	Progressive Conservative	2003	
Bedford	Kelly Regan	Liberal	2009	
Cape Breton Centre	Frank Corbett	NDP	1998	Resigned April 2, 2015.
Cape Breton Centre	David Wilton	Liberal	2015	Elected in a by-election on July 14, 2015.
Cape Breton-Richmond	Michel Samson	Liberal	1998	
Chester-St. Margaret's	Denise Peterson-Rafuse	NDP	2009	
Clare-Digby	Gordon Wilson	Liberal	2013	
Clayton Park West	Diana Whalen	Liberal	2003	
Colchester-Musquodoboit Valley	Larry Harrison	Progressive Conservative	2013	
Colchester North	Karen Casey	Liberal	2006 (Note: First elected as a Progressive Conservative)	
Cole Harbour-Eastern Passage	Joyce Treen	Liberal	2013	
Cole Harbour-Portland Valley	Tony Ince	Liberal	2013	
Cumberland North	Terry Farrell	Liberal	2013	
Cumberland South	Jamie Baillie	Progressive Conservative	2010	
Dartmouth East	Andrew Younger	Liberal	2009	Removed from caucus November 5, 2015
Dartmouth East	Andrew Younger	Independent	2009	
Dartmouth North	Joanne Bernard	Liberal	2013	
Dartmouth South	Allan Rowe	Liberal	2013	Died in office on March 16, 2015.
Dartmouth South	Marian Mancini	NDP	2015	Elected in a by-election on July 14, 2015.
Dartmouth South	Vacant		2015	
Eastern Shore	Kevin Murphy	Liberal	2013	
Fairview-Clayton Park	Patricia Arab	Liberal	2013	
Glace Bay	Geoff MacLellan	Liberal	2010	
Guysborough–Eastern Shore–Tracadie	Lloyd Hines	Liberal	2013	
Halifax Armdale	Lena Diab	Liberal	2013	
Halifax Atlantic	Brendan Maguire	Liberal	2013	
Halifax Chebucto	Joachim Stroink	Liberal	2013	
Halifax Citadel-Sable Island	Labi Kousoulis	Liberal	2013	
Halifax Needham	Maureen MacDonald	NDP	1998	Resigned April 12, 2016
Halifax Needham	Lisa Roberts	NDP	2016	Elected in a by-election on August 30, 2016.
Hammonds Plains-Lucasville	Ben Jessome	Liberal	2013	
Hants East	Margaret Miller	Liberal	2013	
Hants West	Chuck Porter	Progressive Conservative	2006	Removed from caucus June 13, 2014
Hants West	Chuck Porter	Independent	2006	
Hants West	Chuck Porter	Liberal	2006	Joined Liberal caucus on February 17, 2016
Inverness	Allan MacMaster	Progressive Conservative	2009	
Kings North	John Lohr	Progressive Conservative	2013	
Kings South	Keith Irving	Liberal	2013	
Kings West	Leo Glavine	Liberal	2003	
Lunenburg	Suzanne Lohnes-Croft	Liberal	2013	
Lunenburg West	Mark Furey	Liberal	2013	
Northside-Westmount	Eddie Orrell	Progressive Conservative	2011	
Pictou Centre	Pat Dunn	Progressive Conservative	2006, 2013	
Pictou East	Tim Houston	Progressive Conservative	2013	
Pictou West	Karla MacFarlane	Progressive Conservative	2013	
Preston-Dartmouth	Keith Colwell	Liberal	1993, (Note: Eastern Shore) 2003	
Queens-Shelburne	Sterling Belliveau	NDP	2006	
Sackville-Beaver Bank	Stephen Gough	Liberal	2013	
Sackville-Cobequid	Dave Wilson	NDP	2003	
Sydney-Whitney Pier	Gordie Gosse	NDP	2003	Resigned on April 2, 2015.
Sydney-Whitney Pier	Derek Mombourquette	Liberal	2015	Elected in a by-election on July 14, 2015.
Sydney River-Mira-Louisbourg	Alfie MacLeod	Progressive Conservative	1995, 2006	
Timberlea-Prospect	Iain Rankin	Liberal	2013	
Truro-Bible Hill-Millbrook-Salmon River	Lenore Zann	NDP	2009	
Victoria-The Lakes	Pam Eyking	Liberal	2013	
Waverley-Fall River-Beaverbank	Bill Horne	Liberal	2013	
Yarmouth	Zach Churchill	Liberal	2010	

== Seating plan ==
Younger	Harrison	Lohr
Mombourquette	Wilson	MacMaster	Houston	MacFarlane	Orrell	Roberts
Wilton	Rankin	MacLeod	Dunn	BAILLIE	d'Entremont	Wilson	Belliveau	Zann	Peterson-Rafuse
Murphy
Churchill	Bernard	Regan	Samson	MCNEIL	Whalen	Glavine	Delorey	Casey	MacLellan	Colwell
Arab	Farrell	Furey	Kousoulis	Ince	Diab	Hines	Miller	Stroink	Horne
Maguire	Porter	Jessome	Lohnes-Croft	Ekying	Irving	Gough	Treen

== Membership changes in the 62nd Assembly ==
Number of members per party by date	2013	2014	2015				2016			2017
Number of members per party by date	Oct 8	Jun 13	Mar 16	Apr 2	Jul 14	Nov 5	Feb 17	Apr 12	Aug 30	Apr 23
Liberal	33		32		34	33	34			
Progressive Conservative	11	10								
NDP	7			5	6			5	6	5
Independent	0	1				2	1			
Total members	51		50	48	51			50	51	50
Vacant	0		1	3	0			1	0	1

Membership changes in the 62nd General Assembly
Date	Name	District	Party	Reason
October 8, 2013	See list of members			Election day of the 39th Nova Scotia general election
June 13, 2014	Chuck Porter	Hants West	Independent	Removed from the Progressive Conservative caucus
March 16, 2015	Allan Rowe	Dartmouth South	Liberal	Death
April 2, 2015	Frank Corbett	Cape Breton Centre	NDP	Resignation
April 2, 2015	Gordie Gosse	Sydney-Whitney Pier	NDP	Resignation
July 14, 2015	Marian Mancini	Dartmouth South	NDP	Elected in a by-election
July 14, 2015	David Wilton	Cape Breton Centre	Liberal	Elected in a by-election
July 14, 2015	Derek Mombourquette	Sydney-Whitney Pier	Liberal	Elected in a by-election
November 5, 2015	Andrew Younger	Dartmouth East	Independent	Removed from the Liberal caucus
February 17, 2016	Chuck Porter	Hants West	Liberal	Joined Liberal caucus
April 12, 2016	Maureen MacDonald	Halifax Needham	NDP	Resignation
August 30, 2016	Lisa Roberts	Halifax Needham	NDP	Elected in a by-election
April 23, 2017	Marian Mancini	Dartmouth South	NDP	Resignation

== Notes ==
Preceded by 61st General Assembly of Nova Scotia	General Assemblies of Nova Scotia; 2013-2017	Succeeded by 63rd General Assembly of Nova Scotia
