= 62nd Nova Scotia general election =

The 62nd Nova Scotia general election may refer to

- the 2013 Nova Scotia general election, the 61st overall general election for Nova Scotia, for the (due to a counting error in 1859) 62nd General Assembly of Nova Scotia, or
- the 2017 Nova Scotia general election, the 62nd overall general election for Nova Scotia, for the 63rd General Assembly of Nova Scotia, but considered the 40th general election for the Canadian province of Nova Scotia.
