= Percy Gaum =

Canadian politician

MLA for Cape Breton Nova
- In office 1956–1970
- Preceded by: new riding
- Succeeded by: Paul MacEwan

Personal details
- Born: October 19, 1915 Sydney, Nova Scotia
- Died: June 2, 1994 (aged 78) Sydney, Nova Scotia
- Party: Progressive Conservative
- Occupation: Merchant, real estate broker

Percy (Pinky) Gaum (October 19, 1915 – June 22, 1994) was a Canadian politician. He represented the electoral district of Cape Breton Nova in the Nova Scotia House of Assembly from 1956 to 1970. He was a member of the Nova Scotia Progressive Conservative Party.

Gaum was born in Sydney, Nova Scotia, part of the Whitney Pier Jewish community which arose mainly from immigration from eastern European countries in the early 1900s. He was one of a number of descendants of those immigrants who rose to positions of prominence in a variety of professional and business fields. He was educated at the Sydney Academy and was a clothing merchant and real estate broker. He married Hannah Mandelbaum in 1948. He died in a hospital at Sydney in 1994.

Gaum entered provincial politics in the 1956 election, winning the new riding of Cape Breton Nova. He was re-elected in the 1960, 1963, and 1967 elections. On July 16, 1968, Gaum was appointed to the Executive Council of Nova Scotia as Minister of Public Welfare. In February 1969, he was named Minister of Mines following the resignation of Donald Smith. Gaum was defeated when he ran for re-election in 1970, losing to New Democrat Paul MacEwan by 61 votes. Gaum made two unsuccessful attempts to regain the seat, finishing second in the 1974 election, and third in 1978.
