= Paul MacEwan =

Canadian politician (1943–2017)

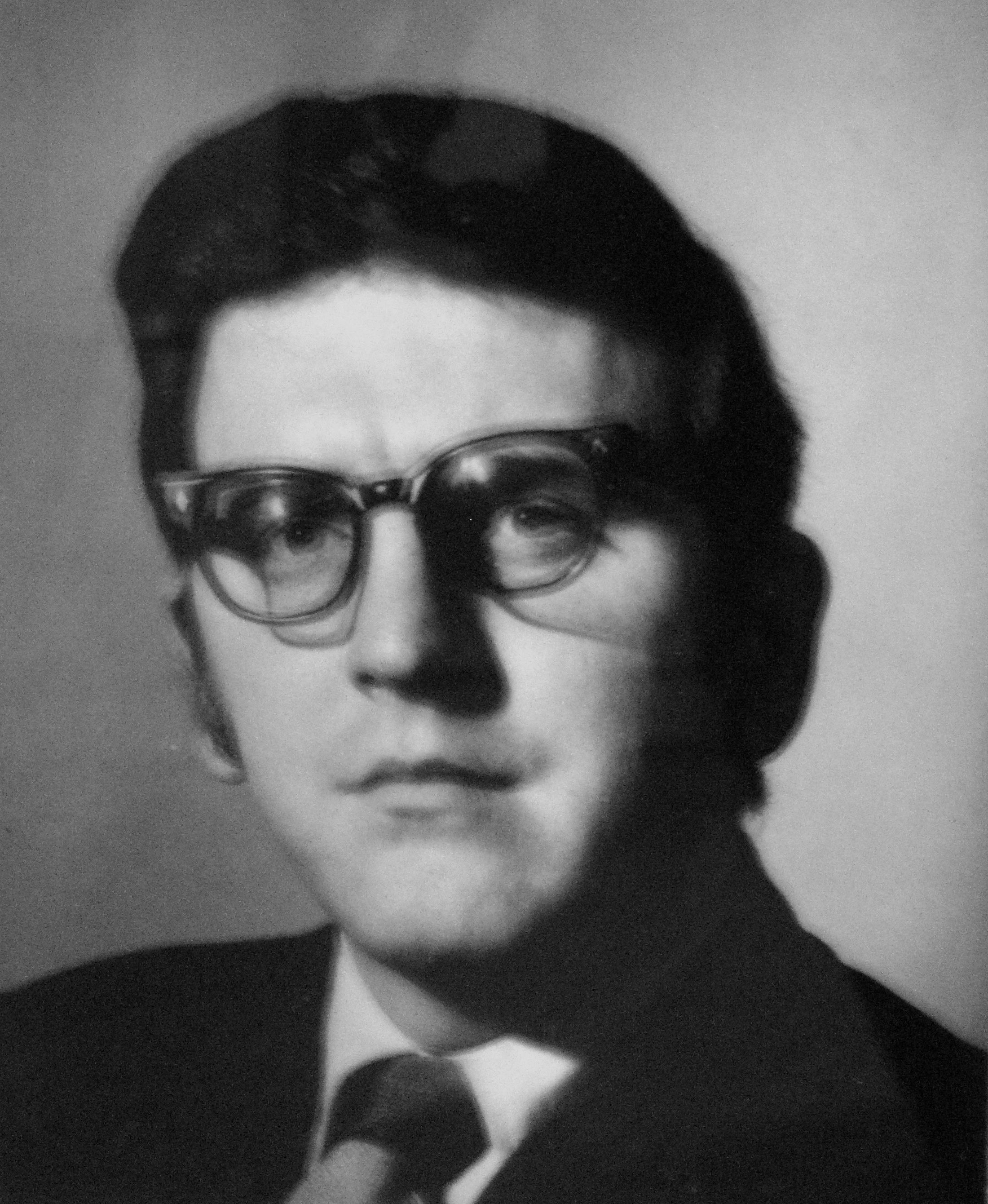

MLA for Cape Breton Nova
- In office 13 October 1970 – 5 August 2003
- Preceded by: Percy Gaum
- Succeeded by: Gordie Gosse

Leader of the Cape Breton Labour Party
- In office 1982–1984

Speaker of the Nova Scotia House of Assembly
- In office 28 June 1993 – 18 November 1996
- Preceded by: Ron Russell
- Succeeded by: Wayne Gaudet

Personal details
- Born: 8 April 1943 Charlottetown, Prince Edward Island
- Died: 2 May 2017 (aged 74) Sydney, Nova Scotia
- Party: Liberal, NDP, Cape Breton Labour Party, Independent
- Occupation: teacher

Paul MacEwan (8 April 1943 – 2 May 2017) was a politician from Cape Breton Island, Nova Scotia, Canada. His 33 years in the Nova Scotia House of Assembly made him the longest continuous serving Member of the Legislative Assembly (MLA) in Nova Scotia history. He was a contentious politician, who seemed to court controversy. So much so, he was kicked out of the Nova Scotia New Democratic Party (NDP) while he was a sitting member of the assembly in 1980 and caused them to lose official party status without him. He formed his own political party, the Cape Breton Labour Party, to contest the 1984 provincial election. He served one-term as its leader, before the party disintegrated because of financial issues. He eventually joined the Liberal Party of Nova Scotia, and became a Liberal member of the legislature. In 1993, he became the Speaker of the House of Assembly. His term as the speaker was marked with many controversies around bias and partisanship. His final years in the legislature saw him take prominent roles as Party Whip for the Liberals. After several health issues, he decided to not run for office again in 2003. He retired and lived another 14 years before finally succumbing to health issues in 2017, at age 74 in Sydney.

== Early life and education ==
He was the son of Horace Frederick MacEwan and was educated at the Sydney Academy, the Nova Scotia Teachers College, Saint Francis Xavier University, Mount Allison University, and Cape Breton University, from which he held a B.A. degree. He then worked as a teacher in Sydney.

== Political career ==
=== As an NDP member ===
MacEwan was elected first as a candidate of the social democratic Nova Scotia New Democratic Party (NDP) in the 1970 provincial election. He ran in Cape Breton Nova, a heavily blue collar riding (electoral district) that was home to the Sydney Steel plant and many coal miners. During his first term as MLA, MacEwan wrote Miners and Steelworkers: Labour in Cape Breton, a history of union activities and political activism in the area, published in 1976. He was also the author of Confederation and the Maritimes which came out later in 1976, and The Akerman Years: Jeremy Akerman and the Nova Scotia NDP, 1965–1980, published in 1980.

MacEwan was closely associated with the work of Jeremy Akerman, who served as the leader of the Nova Scotia NDP from 1968 to 1980. Akerman won the party leadership by four votes in 1968, at a convention where MacEwan persuaded eight uncommitted youth delegates to support Alkerman. On 13 October 1970, he and Akerman were the first two NDP MLAs elected in Nova Scotia's history. The 1970 election saw the ruling Progressive Conservatives (PCs) defeated after 14 years in power. They were replaced by the Liberals headed by Gerald Regan. During the years of Akerman and MacEwan, the NDP advanced by one seat in each election contested, and had four MLAs elected by 1978.

=== Expulsion from the NDP ===
Just after the 1980 federal election, in May, Akerman stepped down as the Nova Scotia NDP's leader. At this time, there was a growing rift between the Cape Breton Island and Mainland wings of the party. This rift exploded in June, when MacEwan, the NDP MLA for Cape Breton Nova, was expelled from the party due to his constant public airing of internal party disputes. His public accusations included the implication that Akerman resigned due to "Trotskyist elements" from the mostly mainland-based provincial council.

To make this situation worse for an incoming leader, the NDP's four MLAs, all from Cape Breton constituencies, voted 3–1 to keep him in the caucus. Len J. Arsenault – the MLA for Cape Breton North – and a leadership candidate, being the only negative vote. MacEwan's expulsion became one of the dominant issues during the leadership race that autumn.

In late September, Akerman was appointed to a top Nova Scotia civil service job that required him to both resign from the Legislature and terminate his membership in the NDP. James 'Buddy' MacEachern, a leadership candidate, and MLA for Cape Breton Centre, was made the interim leader on 2 October.

The newly elected leader, Alexa McDonough, had to settle the Paul MacEwan question. On 9 December 1980, she managed to get her former leadership rivals to vote MacEwan out of the caucus and party. Since she did not have a seat in the Nova Scotia House of Assembly, the party was left with just two seats, because MacEwan was now an independent, and Akerman's seat was left vacant due to his resignation.

For the 1981 Nova Scotia general election, MacEwan ran for re-election in the Cape Breton Nova electoral district as an independent candidate. He was the only independent elected to the legislature that year. As for McDonough's NDP, although she got elected in the Halifax area, the party lost the rest of their Cape Breton seats and official party status in the House of Assembly.

=== Cape Breton Labour Party ===
After MacEwan left the NDP, he established the Cape Breton Labour Party, which presented itself as a rival political party to the others participating in the 1984 provincial election. The main issue separating the Labor Party from the NDP was freedom of speech, which MacEwan maintained the NDP no longer practised, as shown by the party's response to his criticism of Theman's reading recommendations. The party ran three candidates on the Nova Scotian mainland in addition to the eleven seats on Cape Breton Island.

MacEwan was the only one of the party's fourteen candidates to win election in the 1984 provincial election. The Labour Party was the fourth political party in Nova Scotian history to elect someone to the Legislature. Following the 1984 election, however, the party had to cease operations, due to lack of sufficient revenue to carry on its operations.

=== As an independent and a Liberal ===
MacEwan was re-elected as an independent in 1988. After this election, he contested, and won unanimously, the Liberal nomination in Cape Breton Nova, whereupon he was admitted to the Liberal caucus early in 1990. When the Liberals formed the government of Nova Scotia in 1993, he was unanimously elected Speaker of the House. His tenure was often controversial, with accusations of bias lodged by the opposition regarding his policing debates, for creative interpretations of the rules that favour government, and for attending government caucus meetings. He served as speaker until November 1996. He later served as Government House Leader, Chair of the Committee on Private and Local Bills, Deputy Government House Leader, and Caucus Whip. After the Liberals lost power in 1999, he continued to serve as their Deputy House Leader and Whip, and was critic for the Department of Labour and the Workers Compensation Board.

=== Declining health and retirement ===
MacEwan suffered two cerebral aneurisms in 2001 and 2002. He retired in 2003 citing his health as one of the reasons he would not seek re-election. He won nine elections in a row, serving continuously for 33 years in the Nova Scotia Legislature. He holds the record as the Nova Scotia MLA with the longest uninterrupted service in the House of Assembly.

MacEwan was elected three times as a New Democrat: 1970, 1974, and 1978; then, in 1981, as an independent; in 1984, on the Labour Party ticket; in 1988, again as an independent; and in 1993, 1998, and 1999, as a Liberal. He obtained 80 per cent of the vote cast in 1993 and over 50 per cent in 1998 and in 1999. MacEwan's riding was often considered the safest riding in the province, no matter what banner he ran under.

MacEwan was in palliative care in Sydney when he died on 2 May 2017.

== Personal life ==
MacEwan was married to his wife, Carol MacEwan. He had four children.
