= 63rd Nova Scotia general election =

The 63rd Nova Scotia general election may refer to

- the 2017 Nova Scotia general election, the 62nd overall general election for Nova Scotia, for the (due to a counting error in 1859) 63rd General Assembly of Nova Scotia, or
- the 2021 Nova Scotia general election, the 63rd overall general election for Nova Scotia, for the 64th General Assembly of Nova Scotia, but considered the 41st general election for the Canadian province of Nova Scotia.
