= Derek Mombourquette =

Canadian politician

The Honourable Derek Mombourquette ECNS MLA
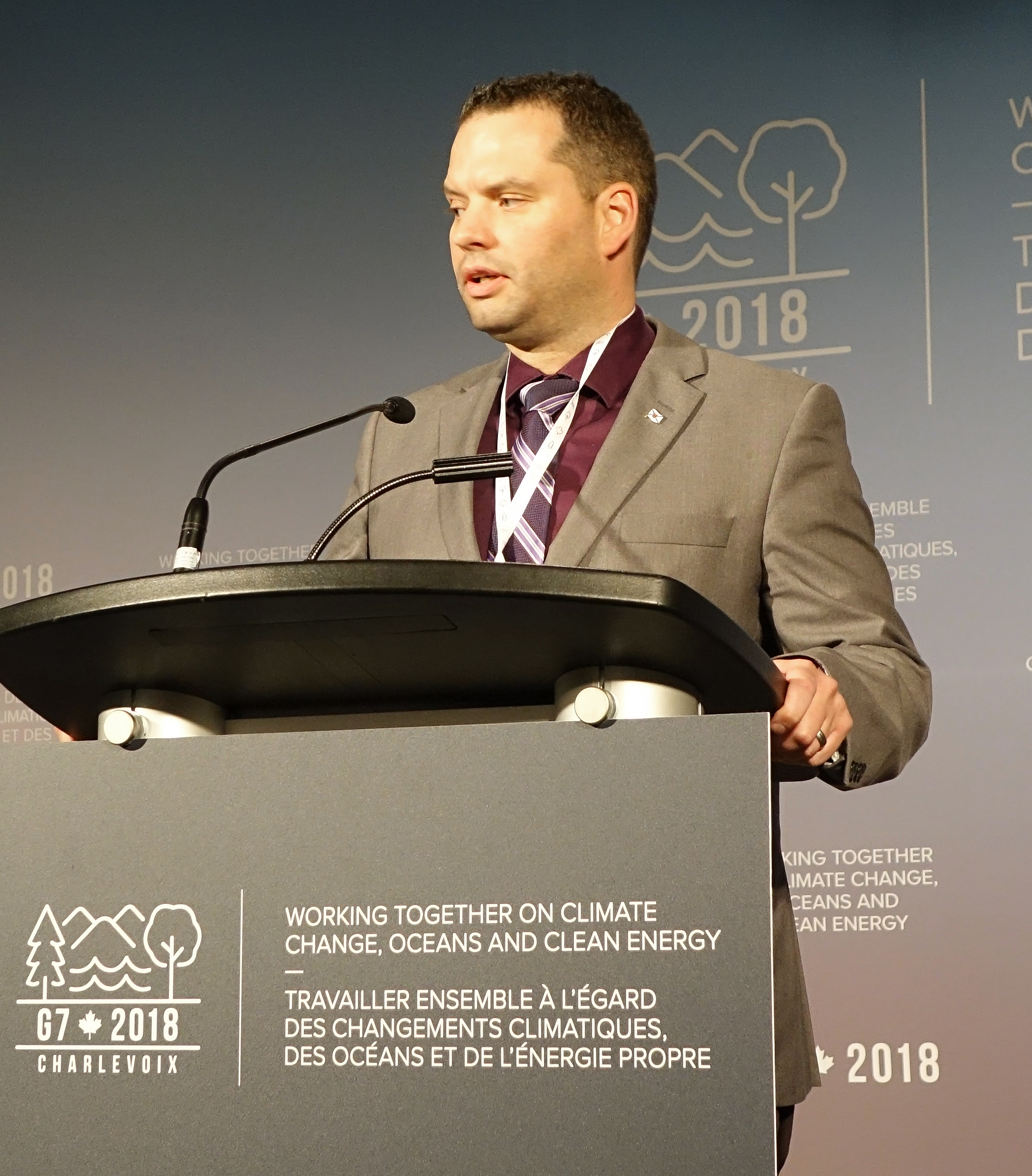

Member of the Nova Scotia House of Assembly for Sydney-Membertou Sydney-Whitney Pier (2015–2021)
- Incumbent
- Assumed office July 14, 2015
- Preceded by: Gordie Gosse

Interim Leader of the Nova Scotia Liberal Party
- In office December 10, 2024 – December 8, 2025
- Preceded by: Zach Churchill
- Succeeded by: Iain Rankin (interim)

Personal details
- Born: 1980 (age 45–46) Sydney, Nova Scotia, Canada
- Party: Liberal

Derek Mombourquette (born 1980) is a Canadian politician who represents the riding of Sydney-Membertou in the Nova Scotia House of Assembly. He served as the interim leader of the Nova Scotia Liberal Party from 2024 to 2025.

== Early life and education ==
Mombourquette was born and raised in Sydney, Nova Scotia, and graduated from Sydney Academy. He attended Cape Breton University, serving as both President and Vice-President of the student union. He also worked as a coordinator for Cape Breton University, and the Nova Scotia Community College.

== Political career ==
Mombourquette served on the municipal council of the Cape Breton Regional Municipality from 2008 to 2012.

In 2013, Mombourquette ran for the Liberals in Sydney-Whitney Pier in the 2013 election, losing to incumbent MLA Gordie Gosse.

He was elected to the Nova Scotia House of Assembly in a by-election on July 14, 2015, for the riding of Sydney-Whitney Pier.

Mombourquette was re-elected in the 2017 election. On June 15, 2017, he was appointed to the Executive Council of Nova Scotia as Minister of Municipal Affairs. On July 5, 2018, Mombourquette was moved to Minister of Energy and Mines in a cabinet shuffle.

Mombourquette was re-elected in the 2021 election, however the Rankin Liberals lost government becoming the Official Opposition.

As of September 22, 2024, Mombourquette serves as the Official Opposition critic for Education and Early Childhood Development as well as for Community Services.

In the 2024 Nova Scotia general election, Mombourquette and Iain Rankin were the only Liberal candidates elected.

On December 10, 2024, Mombourquette was named interim leader of the Nova Scotia Liberal Party. On December 8, 2025, he was succeeded as interim leader by Iain Rankin.

== Election record ==
2024 Nova Scotia general election: Sydney-Membertou
Party	Candidate	Votes	%	±%
Liberal	Derek Mombourquette	3,691	45.05	-9.22
Progressive Conservative	Brian MacArthur	2,905	35.45	+18.00
New Democratic	Alison Aho	1,513	18.46	-9.82
Green	Steven McGrath	85	1.04	–
Total valid votes		8,194		
Total rejected ballots		54		
Turnout		8,248	53.01	
Eligible voters		15,558		
Liberal hold		Swing		
Source: Elections Nova Scotia

2021 Nova Scotia general election: Sydney-Membertou
Party	Candidate	Votes	%	±%
Liberal	Derek Mombourquette	4,561	54.27	+15.55
New Democratic	Madonna Doucette	2,377	28.28	-8.75
Progressive Conservative	Pauline Singer	1,467	17.45	-6.80
Total valid votes		8,405	99.44	
Total rejected ballots		47	0.56	
Turnout		8,452	52.66	
Eligible voters		16,049		
Liberal hold		Swing		+12.15
Source: Elections Nova Scotia

2017 Nova Scotia general election: Sydney-Whitney Pier
Party	Candidate	Votes	%	±%
Liberal	Derek Mombourquette	3,656	38.72	-10.33
New Democratic	Madonna Doucette	3,496	37.03	+6.88
Progressive Conservative	Laurie MacIntosh	2,290	24.25	+3.45
Total valid votes		9,442	100.0	
Total rejected ballots		62	0.65	
Turnout		9,504	52.80	
Eligible voters		18,001		
Liberal hold		Swing		-8.61
Source: Elections Nova Scotia

Nova Scotia provincial by-election, July 14, 2015: Sydney-Whitney Pier On the resignation of Gordie Gosse
Party	Candidate	Votes	%	±%
Liberal	Derek Mombourquette	3,794	49.05	+5.02
New Democratic	Madonna Doucette	2,332	30.15	-19.22
Progressive Conservative	Brian E. MacArthur	1,609	20.80	+14.20
Total valid votes		7,735	99.55	
Total rejected ballots		35	0.45	
Turnout		7,770	42.60	
Electors on the lists		18,238		
Liberal gain from New Democratic		Swing		+12.12
Source: Elections Nova Scotia

2013 Nova Scotia general election: Sydney-Whitney Pier
Party	Candidate	Votes	%	±%
New Democratic	Gordie Gosse	5,084	49.37	−5.25
Liberal	Derek Mombourquette	4,534	44.03	+8.80
Progressive Conservative	Leslie MacPhee	680	6.60	−1.79
Total valid votes		10,298	99.40	
Total rejected ballots		62	0.60	
Turnout		10,360	57.86	
Electors on the lists		17,906	–	
New Democratic hold		Swing		−7.03
Source: Elections Nova Scotia
