= Cape Breton Labour Party =

- Leader: Paul MacEwan (only leader)
- Founded: 1982
- Dissolved: 1984
- Ideology: Social democracy

The Cape Breton Labour Party was a social democratic provincial political party in Nova Scotia, Canada, which drew most of its support from Cape Breton Island, the northern part of the province of Nova Scotia. Founded by Paul MacEwan, it operated from 1982 to 1984.

== Founding ==
The party was founded by Paul MacEwan, who had been an NDP member of the Nova Scotia House of Assembly for ten years, 1970 to 1980. MacEwan was kicked out of the NDP in 1980, after allegedly calling party executive Dennis Theman a Trotskyite. MacEwan ran as an independent in the 1981 election and was re-elected by a strong margin. He took this as a mandate to set up a rival party.

The Cape Breton Labour Party was founded at a convention held in Glace Bay in the fall of 1982. MacEwan was elected its provincial leader. While at first the intent was to run candidates only on Cape Breton Island, the provisions of the Nova Scotia Elections Act forced the party to run candidates also in several mainland ridings to obtain recognition as a registered political party. The party's name was also changed to the Labour Party of Cape Breton and Nova Scotia at this time. In the end, Labour fielded a total of 14 candidates, 11 on Cape Breton and three on the mainland.

In the 1984 election, the 14 Cape Breton Labour candidates obtained a total of 8,322 votes. MacEwan was re-elected, with 3,832 votes. He thus became the first, and so far the only, candidate sponsored by a fourth political party to gain a seat in the Nova Scotia Legislature. Labour candidates managed to retain their deposits in the constituencies of Cape Breton East and Cape Breton Centre, while the NDP vote in those areas plunged to all-time lows. Previously, New Democrats Jeremy Akerman and Buddy MacEachern had led the NDP and served as MLAs for these constituencies.

After the 1984 election, MacEwan felt that the Labour Party could not continue, as it had raised insufficient funds to meet its minimum financial requirements. He ran in the next provincial election, held in 1988, as an independent. He was re-elected and joined the Liberal Party in 1990.

== Issues ==
The main issues in contention between the Labour Party and the NDP centered on how the party was to be run and in what direction. MacEwan maintained that freedom of speech was important in politics and that elected representatives should be free to represent their constituents as they best determined. The Halifax-based NDP, led by Alexa McDonough throughout this period, emphasized established party policy and expected MLAs to subscribe to this first before formulating their opinions on issues.

Much of the tussle was over geography and whether Cape Breton, or downtown Halifax, should be in control of operations. The Halifax NDP claimed that the Labour Party was "separatist" but never identified how. There is no mention found advocating any constitutional change for Cape Breton Island in the advertising run by the Labour Party in the 1984 election. The party issued a multi-point election platform, but its contents were confined to such traditional Cape Breton issues as "proper" levels of government support for the coal and steel industries, a higher minimum wage, reform of workers' compensation, and improvements to highways.

The dispute was accentuated by bad personal relations between MacEwan and McDonough, each viewing the other as unworthy. MacEwan hypothesized that McDonough had encouraged his expulsion from the NDP for political advantage and stated that she had gained the NDP leadership by intrigue. Both criticized the other publicly: McDonough depicted MacEwan as an unrepentant enemy of all the NDP stood for, while MacEwan described McDonough and her father, industrialist Lloyd R. Shaw, as trying to use their wealth to prevent democracy in Nova Scotia politics.

== Election results ==
Election	Leader	Seats	Votes	%	Place	Position
1984	Paul MacEwan	1 / 52	8,322	2.00	4th	Fourth Party

== See also ==
- Cape Breton Island
- List of Nova Scotia political parties
- List of proposed provinces and territories of Canada
