= Preston-Dartmouth =

Canadian provincial electoral district

Nova Scotia electoral district

Defunct provincial electoral district
- Legislature: Nova Scotia House of Assembly
- District created: 2012
- District abolished: 2021
- Last contested: 2017

Demographics
- Electors: 10,720
- Area (km²): 158.00
- Census division: Halifax Regional Municipality

Preston-Dartmouth was a provincial electoral district in Nova Scotia, Canada, that elects one member of the Nova Scotia House of Assembly. The riding was created in 2012 as Dartmouth-Preston, with 100 per cent of the former district of Preston, 10 per cent of the former district of Cole Harbour, 9 per cent of the district of Dartmouth East and 3 per cent of the district of Eastern Shore. A private member's bill in May 2013 changed the name to Preston-Dartmouth. It was redistributed prior to the 2021 election into the re-created Preston district, as well as small parts that went to Colchester-Musquodoboit Valley, Eastern Shore and Cole Harbour.

The district included part of the Westphal area from the former district of Cole Harbour and the Ross Road area from the Eastern Shore district. The western part of the district included the area north of Main Street and east of Caledonia Road, until Geovex Court. The former district of Preston, which took in areas of suburban affluence and rural poverty, was created in 1993 to give black Nova Scotians a better chance of representation in the legislature. Approximately one third of the district's residents were black. It included historically important black communities at North Preston, East Preston and Cherrybrook. Many people in this riding worked in Metro Halifax in the trade and service sectors.

== Members of the Legislative Assembly ==
This riding has elected the following members of the Legislative Assembly:

Preston-Dartmouth
Legislature	Years	Member	Party
62nd	2013–2017	Keith Colwell	Liberal
63rd	2017–2021	Keith Colwell	Liberal

== Election results ==
2017 Nova Scotia general election
Party	Candidate	Votes	%	±%
Liberal	Keith Colwell	2,572	51.33	-7.06
New Democratic	Shelley Fashan	1,113	22.21	-9.67
Progressive Conservative	Irvine Carvery	1,105	22.05	+12.33
Green	Aaron Alexander	221	4.41	
Total valid votes		5,011	99.23	
Total rejected ballots		39	0.77	-0.61
Turnout		5,050	44.28	-8.62
Eligible voters		11,404		
Liberal hold		Swing		+1.30
Source: Elections Nova Scotia

2013 Nova Scotia general election
Party	Candidate	Votes	%	±%
Liberal	Keith Colwell	3,326	58.39	+19.55
New Democratic	André Cain	1,816	31.88	-6.51
Progressive Conservative	Andrew J. Mecke	554	9.73	-11.64
Total valid votes		5,696	98.61	
Total rejected ballots		80	1.39	
Turnout		5,776	52.90	
Eligible voters		10,918		
Liberal hold		Swing		+13.03
Source: Elections Nova Scotia

2009 provincial election redistributed results
Party	Vote	%
Liberal	2,242	38.84
New Democratic	2,216	38.39
Progressive Conservative	1,233	21.36
Green	81	1.40
