= 2017 Nova Scotia general election =

Canadian provincial election

- May 30, 2017

All 51 seats in the Nova Scotia House of Assembly 26 seats needed for a majority
- Turnout: 53.35% ▼5.73 pp
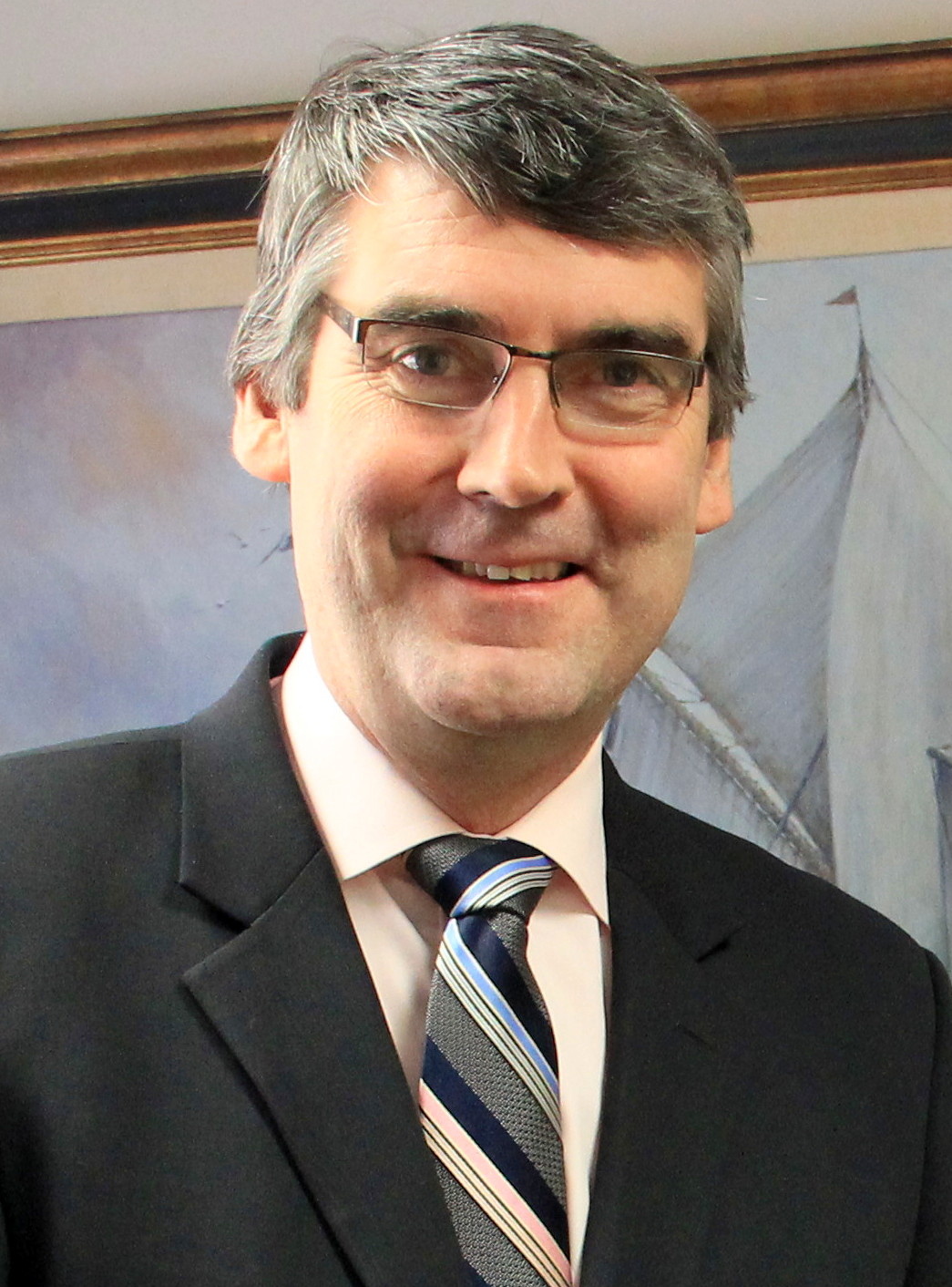

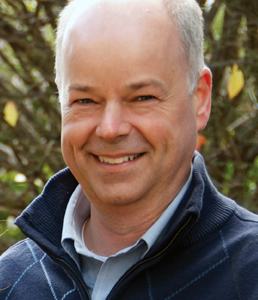

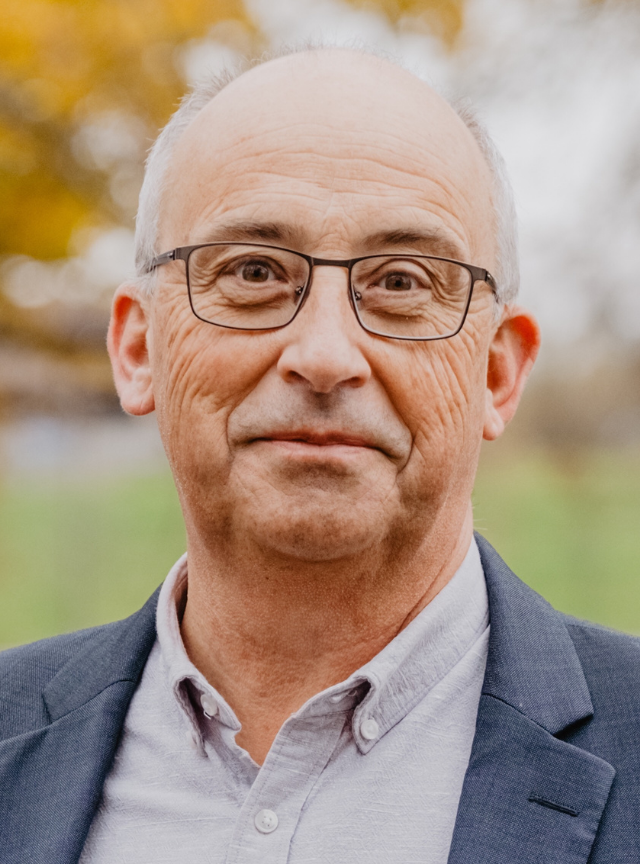
	Majority party	Minority party	Third party
Leader	Stephen McNeil	Jamie Baillie	Gary Burrill
Party	Liberal	Progressive Conservative	New Democratic
Leader since	April 28, 2007	October 26, 2010	February 27, 2016
Leader's seat	Annapolis	Cumberland South	Halifax Chebucto
Last election	33 seats, 45.71%	11 seats, 26.31%	7 seats, 26.84%
Seats before	34	10	5
Seats won	27	17	7
Seat change	▼7	▲7	▲2
Popular vote	158,384	143,353	86,299
Percentage	39.47%	35.73%	21.51%
Swing	▼6.24pp	▲9.42pp	▼5.33pp
- Popular vote by riding. As this is an FPTP election, seat totals are not determined by popular vote, but instead via results by each riding. Riding names are listed at the bottom.
Premier before election
Stephen McNeil
Liberal
Premier after election
Stephen McNeil
Liberal

The 2017 Nova Scotia general election was held on May 30, 2017, to elect members to the Nova Scotia House of Assembly.

The Liberals under Premier Stephen McNeil won re-election with a reduced majority, falling from 34 seats at dissolution to 27 seats.

== Timeline ==
- October 8, 2013 – The Liberal Party, led by Stephen McNeil, wins the 2013 Nova Scotia general election. The Progressive Conservative Association becomes the official opposition, and the governing New Democratic Party is relegated to third party status.
- November 23, 2013 – Darrell Dexter resigns as leader of the New Democratic Party (NDP) and MLA Maureen MacDonald becomes interim leader.
- February 27, 2016 – Gary Burrill is elected leader of the Nova Scotia New Democratic Party.
- June 28, 2016 - The Atlantica Party becomes Nova Scotia's newest registered political party.
- April 30, 2017 – Premier Stephen McNeil calls a general election for May 30, 2017.

Changes in seats held (2014–2017)
Seat	Before				Change		
Seat	Date	Member	Party	Reason	Date	Member	Party
Hants West	June 13, 2014	Chuck Porter	█ PC	Left party			█ Independent
Dartmouth South	March 16, 2015	Allan Rowe	█ Liberal	Died in office	July 14, 2015	Marian Mancini	█ New Democratic
Cape Breton Centre	April 2, 2015	Frank Corbett	█ New Democratic	Resignation	July 14, 2015	David Wilton	█ Liberal
Sydney-Whitney Pier	April 2, 2015	Gordie Gosse	█ New Democratic	Resignation	July 14, 2015	Derek Mombourquette	█ Liberal
Dartmouth East	November 5, 2015	Andrew Younger	█ Liberal	Dismissed from Cabinet and caucus			█ Independent
Hants West	February 17, 2016	Chuck Porter	█ Independent	Joins Liberal caucus			█ Liberal
Halifax Needham	April 12, 2016	Maureen MacDonald	█ New Democratic	Resignation	August 30, 2016	Lisa Roberts	█ New Democratic
Dartmouth South	April 23, 2017	Marian Mancini	█ New Democratic	Resignation			█ Vacant

== Party standings ==
=== Results by party ===
↓
27	17	7
Liberal	Progressive Conservative	New Democratic

Summary of the 2017 Nova Scotia House of Assembly election
Party	Leader	Candidates	Votes				Seats		
Party	Leader	Candidates	#	±	%	Change (pp)	2013	2017	±
Liberal	Stephen McNeil	51	158,383	31,729▼	39.47	-6.23	33	27 / 51	6▼
Progressive Conservative	Jamie Baillie	51	143,354	33,902▲	35.73	9.41	11	17 / 51	6▲
New Democratic	Gary Burrill	51	86,299	25,323▼	21.51	-5.33	7	7 / 51	Steady
Green	Thomas Trappenberg	32	11,127	7,599▲	2.77	1.92			
Atlantica	Jonathan Geoffrey Dean	15	1,632	1,632▲	0.41	New			
Independent		3	447	791▼	0.11	-0.19			
Total		203	401,242		100.00%				
Rejected ballots			2,123	1,016▼					
Turnout			403,365	15,726▼	53.35%	4.85▼			
Registered voters			756,113	36,036▲					

=== Synopsis of results ===
Results by riding - 2017 Nova Scotia general election
Riding	Region	Winning party							Turnout (Note: including spoilt ballots)	Votes						
Riding	Region	2013	1st place	Votes	Share	Margin #	Margin %	2nd place	Turnout	Lib	PC	NDP	Grn	Atl	Ind	Total
Annapolis	Annapolis Valley	Lib	Lib	6,410	64.73%	4,893	49.41%	NDP	58.86%	6,410	1,480	1,517	366	130	–	9,903
Antigonish	Central Nova	Lib	Lib	3,877	43.38%	738	8.26%	PC	62.08%	3,877	3,139	1,815	–	106	–	8,937
Argyle-Barrington	South Shore	PC	PC	4,031	65.07%	2,190	35.35%	Lib	49.76%	1,841	4,031	323	–	–	–	6,195
Bedford	Suburban Halifax	Lib	Lib	5,831	52.69%	2,443	22.08%	PC	51.50%	5,831	3,388	1,362	485	–	–	11,066
Cape Breton Centre	Cape Breton	NDP	NDP	3,419	43.77%	796	10.19%	Lib	59.68%	2,623	1,770	3,419	–	–	–	7,812
Cape Breton-Richmond	Cape Breton	Lib	PC	3,337	43.57%	21	0.27%	Lib	68.56%	3,316	3,337	1,006	–	–	–	7,659
Chester-St. Margaret's	South Shore	NDP	Lib	3,112	35.46%	91	1.04%	NDP	57.03%	3,112	2,230	3,021	413	–	–	8,776
Clare-Digby	Annapolis Valley	Lib	Lib	4,044	50.49%	1,761	21.99%	PC	56.08%	4,044	2,283	1,682	–	–	–	8,009
Clayton Park West	Central Halifax	Lib	Lib	4,035	46.05%	1,731	19.75%	PC	49.64%	4,035	2,304	1,764	506	154	–	8,763
Colchester North	Fundy-Northeast	Lib	Lib	3,654	46.49%	429	5.46%	PC	54.57%	3,654	3,225	980	–	–	–	7,859
Colchester-Musquodoboit Valley	Fundy-Northeast	PC	PC	3,655	50.57%	1,708	23.63%	Lib	51.18%	1,947	3,655	1,625	–	–	–	7,227
Cole Harbour-Eastern Passage	Dartmouth/Cole Harbour/Eastern Shore	Lib	PC	2,682	36.40%	97	1.32%	Lib	48.98%	2,585	2,682	1,759	343	–	–	7,369
Cole Harbour-Portland Valley	Dartmouth/Cole Harbour/Eastern Shore	Lib	Lib	3,583	36.85%	380	3.91%	PC	53.95%	3,583	3,203	2,552	385	–	–	9,723
Cumberland North	Fundy-Northeast	Lib	PC	3,632	51.66%	919	13.07%	Lib	53.30%	2,713	3,632	496	–	84	106	7,031
Cumberland South	Fundy-Northeast	PC	PC	3,536	51.49%	757	11.02%	Lib	62.37%	2,779	3,536	398 (Note: Larry Duchesne was previously a member of the Legislative Assembly of Prince Edward Island and leader of the Prince Edward Island New Democratic Party.)	–	154	–	6,867
Dartmouth East	Dartmouth/Cole Harbour/Eastern Shore	Lib	PC	3,309	41.15%	191	2.38%	Lib	54.31%	3,118	3,309	964	650	–	–	8,041
Dartmouth North	Dartmouth/Cole Harbour/Eastern Shore	Lib	NDP	2,771	39.36%	329	4.67%	Lib	42.65%	2,442	1,384	2,771	318	126	–	7,041
Dartmouth South	Dartmouth/Cole Harbour/Eastern Shore	Lib	NDP	3,545	39.65%	197	2.20%	Lib	50.83%	3,348	1,418	3,545	506	123	–	8,940
Eastern Shore	Dartmouth/Cole Harbour/Eastern Shore	Lib	Lib	2,527	37.71%	503	7.51%	PC	53.67%	2,527	2,024	1,780	221	–	149	6,701
Fairview-Clayton Park	Central Halifax	Lib	Lib	2,925	39.90%	735	10.03%	NDP	41.93%	2,925	1,839	2,190	376	–	–	7,330
Glace Bay	Cape Breton	Lib	Lib	3,317	46.65%	379	5.33%	PC	57.42%	3,317	2,938	718	–	137	–	7,110
Guysborough–Eastern Shore–Tracadie	Central Nova	Lib	Lib	2,565	43.09%	71	1.19%	PC	58.47%	2,565	2,494	894	–	–	–	5,953
Halifax Armdale	Central Halifax	Lib	Lib	2,962	44.58%	864	13.00%	NDP	53.48%	2,962	1,253	2,098	246	85	–	6,644
Halifax Atlantic	Suburban Halifax	Lib	Lib	4,219	55.48%	2,491	32.76%	NDP	50.03%	4,219	1,300	1,728	357	–	–	7,604
Halifax Chebucto	Central Halifax	Lib	NDP	4,197	46.15%	624	6.86%	Lib	51.88%	3,573	963	4,197	361	–	–	9,094
Halifax Citadel-Sable Island	Central Halifax	Lib	Lib	2,419	41.28%	801	13.67%	NDP	39.34%	2,419	1,480	1,618	343	–	–	5,860
Halifax Needham	Central Halifax	NDP	NDP	3,880	51.36%	1,805	23.89%	Lib	45.89%	2,075	1,135	3,880	465	–	–	7,555
Hammonds Plains-Lucasville	Suburban Halifax	Lib	Lib	3,432	46.69%	1,011	13.76%	PC	57.08%	3,432	2,421	1,157	340	–	–	7,350
Hants East	Fundy-Northeast	Lib	Lib	3,923	43.67%	819	9.12%	PC	48.06%	3,923	3,104	1,508	449	–	–	8,984
Hants West	Annapolis Valley	PC	Lib	4,589	54.87%	2,173	25.98%	PC	53.94%	4,589	2,416	1,042	243	73	–	8,363
Inverness	Cape Breton	PC	PC	4,687	61.90%	2,340	30.90%	Lib	66.22%	2,347	4,687	538	–	–	–	7,572
Kings North	Annapolis Valley	PC	PC	3,823	45.94%	1,039	12.49%	Lib	52.19%	2,784	3,823	1,347	295	72	–	8,321
Kings South	Annapolis Valley	Lib	Lib	4,269	46.71%	1,773	19.40%	PC	52.26%	4,269	2,496	1,921	337	116	–	9,139
Kings West	Annapolis Valley	Lib	Lib	4,190	52.45%	1,175	14.71%	PC	52.29%	4,190	3,015	536	247	–	–	7,988
Lunenburg	South Shore	Lib	Lib	3,110	39.45%	673	8.54%	PC	55.47%	3,110	2,437	2,336	–	–	–	7,883
Lunenburg West	South Shore	Lib	Lib	3,839	47.10%	1,578	19.36%	PC	50.51%	3,839	2,261	1,690	361	–	–	8,151
Northside-Westmount	Cape Breton	PC	PC	5,941	63.46%	3,956	42.26%	Lib	56.62%	1,985	5,941	1,436	–	–	–	9,362
Pictou Centre	Central Nova	PC	PC	3,773	52.36%	1,746	24.23%	Lib	55.79%	2,027	3,773	1,406	–	–	–	7,206
Pictou East	Central Nova	PC	PC	5,275	73.88%	3,974	55.66%	Lib	59.90%	1,301	5,275	564	–	–	–	7,140
Pictou West	Central Nova	PC	PC	4,333	62.44%	3,031	43.68%	NDP	62.08%	1,143	4,333	1,302	161	–	–	6,939
Preston-Dartmouth	Dartmouth/Cole Harbour/Eastern Shore	Lib	Lib	2,572	51.33%	1,459	29.12%	NDP	44.28%	2,572	1,105	1,113	221	–	–	5,011
Queens-Shelburne	South Shore	NDP	PC	3,244	43.82%	941	12.71%	Lib	52.70%	2,303	3,244	1,581	275	–	–	7,403
Sackville-Beaver Bank	Suburban Halifax	Lib	PC	2,923	43.58%	768	11.45%	Lib	48.47%	2,155	2,923	1,332	231	66	–	6,707
Sackville-Cobequid	Suburban Halifax	NDP	NDP	3,465	44.17%	1,427	18.19%	Lib	50.95%	2,038	1,991	3,465	262	88	–	7,844
Sydney River-Mira-Louisbourg	Cape Breton	PC	PC	6,370	67.73%	4,149	44.11%	Lib	60.76%	2,221	6,370	814	–	–	–	9,405
Sydney-Whitney Pier	Cape Breton	NDP	Lib	3,656	38.72%	160	1.69%	NDP	52.62%	3,656	2,290	3,496	–	–	–	9,442
Timberlea-Prospect	Suburban Halifax	Lib	Lib	4,272	49.90%	2,242	26.19%	PC	53.58%	4,272	2,030	1,804	337	118	–	8,561
Truro-Bible Hill-Millbrook-Salmon River	Fundy-Northeast	NDP	NDP	3,455	43.95%	943	12.00%	PC	48.43%	1,894	2,512	3,455	–	–	–	7,861
Victoria-The Lakes	Cape Breton	Lib	PC	4,373	59.55%	2,404	32.74%	Lib	58.52%	1,969	4,373	544	265	–	192	7,343
Waverley-Fall River-Beaver Bank	Suburban Halifax	Lib	Lib	3,160	37.94%	65	0.78%	PC	55.47%	3,160	3,095	1,567	506	–	–	8,328
Yarmouth	South Shore	Lib	Lib	5,364	68.16%	3,357	42.66%	PC	57.12%	5,364	2,007	243	256	–	–	7,870

= Open seat
= Turnout is above provincial average
= Winning candidate was in previous Legislature
= Incumbent had switched allegiance
= Previously incumbent in another riding
= Not incumbent; was previously elected to the Legislature
= Incumbency arose from byelection gain
= Other incumbents renominated
= Previously an MP in the House of Commons of Canada
= Multiple candidates

== Retiring incumbents ==
Liberal

- Diana Whalen, Clayton Park West

New Democratic

- Sterling Belliveau, Queens-Shelburne
- Marian Mancini, Dartmouth South

Independent

- Andrew Younger, Dartmouth East

== Nominated candidates ==
=== Annapolis Valley ===
Electoral district	Candidates					Incumbent
Electoral district	Liberal	PC	NDP	Green	Atlantica	Incumbent
Annapolis	Stephen McNeil; 6,410; 64.73%	Ginny Hurlock; 1,480; 14.94%	Colin Sproul; 1,517; 15.32%	Zac Crockatt; 366; 3.70%	Kent Robinson; 130; 1.31%	Stephen McNeil
Clare-Digby	Gordon Wilson; 4,044; 50.49%	Normand Cormier; 2,283; 28.51%	Harold Neil; 1,682; 21.00%			Gordon Wilson
Hants West	Chuck Porter; 4,589; 54.87%	Janice Munroe Dodge; 2,416; 28.89%	Lalia Kerr; 1,042; 12.46%	Torin Buzek; 243; 2.91%	Edward Boucher; 73; 0.87%	Chuck Porter
Kings North	Geof Turner; 2,784; 33.46%	John Lohr; 3,823; 45.94%	Ted Champion; 1,347; 16.19%	Mary Lou Harley; 295; 3.55%	Bryden Deadder; 72; 0.87%	John Lohr
Kings South	Keith Irving; 4,269; 46.71%	Peter Harrison; 2,496; 27.31%	Stephen Schneider; 1,921; 21.02%	Sheila Richardson; 337; 3.69%	Joel Hirtle; 116; 1.27%	Keith Irving
Kings West	Leo Glavine; 4,190; 52.45%	Chris Palmer; 3,015; 37.74%	Cheryl Burbidge; 536; 6.71%	Madeline Taylor; 247; 3.09%		Leo Glavine

=== South Shore ===
Electoral district	Candidates				Incumbent
Electoral district	Liberal	PC	NDP	Green	Incumbent
Argyle-Barrington	Louis d'Entremont; 1,841; 29.72%	Chris d'Entremont; 4,031; 65.07%	Greg Foster; 323; 5.21%		Chris d'Entremont
Chester-St. Margaret's	Hugh MacKay; 3,112; 35.46%	Julie Chaisson; 2,230; 25.41%	Denise Peterson-Rafuse; 3,021; 34.42%	Harry Ward; 413; 4.71%	Denise Peterson-Rafuse
Lunenburg	Suzanne Lohnes-Croft; 3,110; 39.45%	Brian Pickings; 2,437; 30.91%	Marc Breaugh; 2,336; 29.63%		Suzanne Lohnes-Croft
Lunenburg West	Mark Furey; 3,839; 47.10%	Carole Hipwell; 2,261; 27.74%	Lisa Norman; 1,690; 20.73%	Michael Sheppard; 361; 4.43%	Mark Furey
Queens-Shelburne	Vernon Oickle; 2,303; 31.11%	Kim Masland; 3,244; 43.82%	John Davis; 1,581; 21.36%	Kathaleen Milan; 275; 3.71%	Sterling Belliveau†
Yarmouth	Zach Churchill; 5,364; 68.16%	Mitch Bonnar; 2,007; 25.50%	David Olie; 243; 3.09%	Jim Laverie; 256; 3.25%	Zach Churchill

=== Fundy-Northeast ===
Electoral district	Candidates						Incumbent
Electoral district	Liberal	PC	NDP	Green	Atlantica	Independent	Incumbent
Colchester-Musquodoboit Valley	Matthew Rushton; 1,947; 26.94%	Larry Harrison; 3,655; 50.57%	Janet Moulton; 1,625; 22.49%				Larry Harrison
Colchester North	Karen Casey; 3,654; 46.49%	Rebecca Taylor; 3,225; 41.04%	James Finnie; 980; 12.47%				Karen Casey
Cumberland North	Terry Farrell; 2,713; 38.59%	Elizabeth Smith-McCrossin; 3,632; 51.66%	Earl Dow; 496; 7.05%		Bill Archer; 84; 1.19%	Richard Plett; 106; 1.51%	Terry Farrell
Cumberland South	Kenny John Jackson; 2,779; 40.47%	Jamie Baillie; 3,536; 51.49%	Larry Duchesne; 398; 5.80%		Thor Lengies; 154; 2.24%		Jamie Baillie
Hants East	Margaret Miller; 3,923; 43.67%	John A. MacDonald; 3,104; 34.55%	Liam Crouse; 1,508; 16.79%	Jenn Kang; 449; 5.00%			Margaret Miller
Truro-Bible Hill-Millbrook-Salmon River	Craig Johnson; 1,894; 24.09%	Keltie Jones; 2,512; 31.96%	Lenore Zann; 3,455; 43.95%				Lenore Zann

=== Central Halifax ===
Electoral district	Candidates					Incumbent
Electoral district	Liberal	PC	NDP	Green	Atlantica	Incumbent
Clayton Park West	Rafah DiCostanzo; 4,035; 46.05%	Paul Kimball; 2,304; 26.29%	Rana Zaman; 1,764; 20.13%	Thomas Trappenberg; 506; 5.77%	Jonathan Dean; 154; 1.76%	Diana Whalen†
Fairview-Clayton Park	Patricia Arab; 2,925; 39.90%	Paul Beasant; 1,839; 25.09%	Joanne Hussey; 2,190; 29.88%	Charlene Boyce; 376; 5.13%		Patricia Arab
Halifax Armdale	Lena Diab; 2,962; 44.58%	Sylvia Gillard; 1,253; 18.86%	David Wheeler; 2,098; 31.58%	Marc-André Tremblay; 246; 3.70%	Michael McLeod; 85; 1.28%	Lena Diab
Halifax Chebucto	Joachim Stroink; 3,573; 39.29%	John Wesley Chisholm; 963; 10.59%	Gary Burrill; 4,197; 46.15%	Casey Meijer; 361; 3.97%		Joachim Stroink
Halifax Citadel-Sable Island	Labi Kousoulis; 2,419; 41.28%	Rob Batherson; 1,480; 25.26%	Glenn Walton; 1,618; 27.61%	Martin Willison; 343; 5.85%		Labi Kousoulis
Halifax Needham	Melinda Daye; 2,075; 27.47%	Matthew Donahoe; 1,135; 15.02%	Lisa Roberts; 3,880; 51.36%	Andrew Jamieson; 465; 6.15%		Lisa Roberts

=== Suburban Halifax ===
Electoral district	Candidates					Incumbent
Electoral district	Liberal	PC	NDP	Green	Atlantica	Incumbent
Bedford	Kelly Regan; 5,831; 52.69%	Valerie White; 3,388; 30.62%	Blake Wright; 1,362; 12.31%	Michealle Hanshaw; 485; 4.38%		Kelly Regan
Halifax Atlantic	Brendan Maguire; 4,219; 55.48%	Bruce Holland; 1,300; 17.10%	Trish Keeping; 1,728; 22.72%	Chelsey Carter; 357; 4.69%		Brendan Maguire
Hammonds Plains-Lucasville	Ben Jessome; 3,432; 46.69%	Matt Whitman; 2,421; 32.94%	Paul McGuinness; 1,157; 15.74%	Jessica Alexander; 340; 4.63%		Ben Jessome
Sackville-Beaver Bank	Stephen Gough; 2,155; 32.13%	Brad Johns; 2,923; 43.58%	Dennis Kutchera; 1,332; 19.86%	Michael Montgomery; 231; 3.44%	Rita Billington; 66; 0.98%	Stephen Gough
Sackville-Cobequid	Michel Hindlet; 2,038; 25.98%	John Giannakos; 1,991; 25.38%	Dave Wilson; 3,465; 44.17%	Tanner Montgomery; 262; 3.34%	Cathy Morgan; 88; 1.12%	Dave Wilson
Timberlea-Prospect	Iain Rankin; 4,272; 49.90%	Tim Kohoot; 2,030; 23.71%	Linda Moxsom Skinner; 1,804; 21.07%	Kai Trappenberg; 337; 3.94%	Matt Mansfield; 118; 1.38%	Iain Rankin
Waverley-Fall River-Beaver Bank	Bill Horne; 3,160; 37.94%	Dan McNaughton; 3,095; 37.16%	Trevor Sanipass; 1,567; 18.82%	Anthony Edmonds; 506; 6.08%		Bill Horne

=== Dartmouth/Cole Harbour/Eastern Shore ===
Electoral district	Candidates						Incumbent
Electoral district	Liberal	PC	NDP	Green	Atlantica	Independent	Incumbent
Cole Harbour-Eastern Passage	Joyce Treen; 2,585; 35.08%	Barbara Adams; 2,682; 36.40%	Nancy Jakeman; 1,759; 23.87%	Rebecca Mosher; 343; 4.65%			Joyce Treen
Cole Harbour-Portland Valley	Tony Ince; 3,583; 36.85%	Chris Mont; 3,203; 32.94%	Andre Cain; 2,552; 26.25%	Melanie Mulrooney; 385; 3.96%			Tony Ince
Dartmouth East	Edgar Burns; 3,118; 38.78%	Tim Halman; 3,309; 41.15%	Bill McEwen; 964; 11.99%	Matthew Richey; 650; 8.08%			Andrew Younger†
Dartmouth North	Joanne Bernard; 2,442; 34.68%	Melanie Russell; 1,384; 19.66%	Susan Leblanc; 2,771; 39.36%	Tyler Colbourne; 318; 4.52%	David Boyd; 126; 1.79%		Joanne Bernard
Dartmouth South	Vishal Bhardwaj; 3,348; 37.45%	Jad Crnogorac; 1,418; 15.86%	Claudia Chender; 3,545; 39.65%	June Trenholm; 506; 5.66%	Jim Murray; 123; 1.38%		Vacant†
Eastern Shore	Kevin Murphy; 2,527; 37.71%	Patricia Auchnie; 2,024; 30.20%	Devin Ashley; 1,780; 26.56%	Andy Berry; 221; 3.30%		Randy Carter; 149; 2.22%	Kevin Murphy
Preston-Dartmouth	Keith Colwell; 2,572; 51.33%	Irvine Carvery; 1,105; 22.05%	Shelley Fashan; 1,113; 22.21%	Aaron Alexander; 221; 4.41%			Keith Colwell

=== Central Nova ===
Electoral district	Candidates					Incumbent
Electoral district	Liberal	PC	NDP	Green	Atlantica	Incumbent
Antigonish	Randy Delorey; 3,877; 43.38%	Ray Mattie; 3,139; 35.12%	Moraig MacGillivray; 1,815; 20.31%		Ryan Smyth; 106; 1.19%	Randy Delorey
Guysborough–Eastern Shore–Tracadie	Lloyd Hines; 2,565; 43.09%	Rob Wolf; 2,494; 41.89%	Marney Simmons; 894; 15.02%			Lloyd Hines
Pictou Centre	Jeff Davis; 2,027; 28.13%	Pat Dunn; 3,773; 52.36%	Henderson Paris; 1,406; 19.51%			Pat Dunn
Pictou East	John Fraser; 1,30118.22%	Tim Houston; 5,275; 73.88%	Deborah Stiles; 564; 7.90%			Tim Houston
Pictou West	Ben MacLean; 1,143; 16.47%	Karla MacFarlane; 4,333; 62.44%	Shawn McNamara; 1,302; 18.76%	Cecile Vigneault; 161; 2.32%		Karla MacFarlane

=== Cape Breton ===
Electoral district	Candidates						Incumbent
Electoral district	Liberal	PC	NDP	Green	Atlantica	Independent	Incumbent
Cape Breton Centre	David Wilton; 2,623; 33.58%	Louie Piovesan; 1,770; 22.66%	Tammy Martin; 3,419; 43.77%				David Wilton
Cape Breton-Richmond	Michel Samson; 3,316; 43.30%	Alana Paon; 3,337; 43.57%	Larry Keating; 1,006; 13.13%				Michel Samson
Glace Bay	Geoff MacLellan; 3,317; 46.65%	John White; 2,938; 41.32%	Lois MacDougall; 718; 10.10%		Steven MacNeil; 137; 1.93%		Geoff MacLellan
Inverness	Bobby Morris; 2,347; 31.00%	Allan MacMaster; 4,687; 61.90%	Michelle Smith; 538; 7.11%				Allan MacMaster
Northside-Westmount	John Higgins; 1,985; 21.20%	Eddie Orrell; 5,941; 63.46%	Ronald Crowther; 1,436; 15.34%				Eddie Orrell
Sydney River-Mira-Louisbourg	Katherine MacDonald; 2,221; 23.62%	Alfie MacLeod; 6,370; 67.73%	Bill Matheson; 814; 8.65%				Alfie MacLeod
Sydney-Whitney Pier	Derek Mombourquette; 3,656; 38.72%	Laurie MacIntosh; 2,290; 24.25%	Madonna Doucette; 3,496; 37.03%				Derek Mombourquette
Victoria-The Lakes	Pam Eyking; 1,969; 26.81%	Keith Bain; 4,373; 59.55%	Lisa Bond; 544; 7.41%	Adrianna MacKinnon; 265; 3.61%		Stemer MacLeod; 192; 2.61%	Pam Eyking

== Opinion polls ==
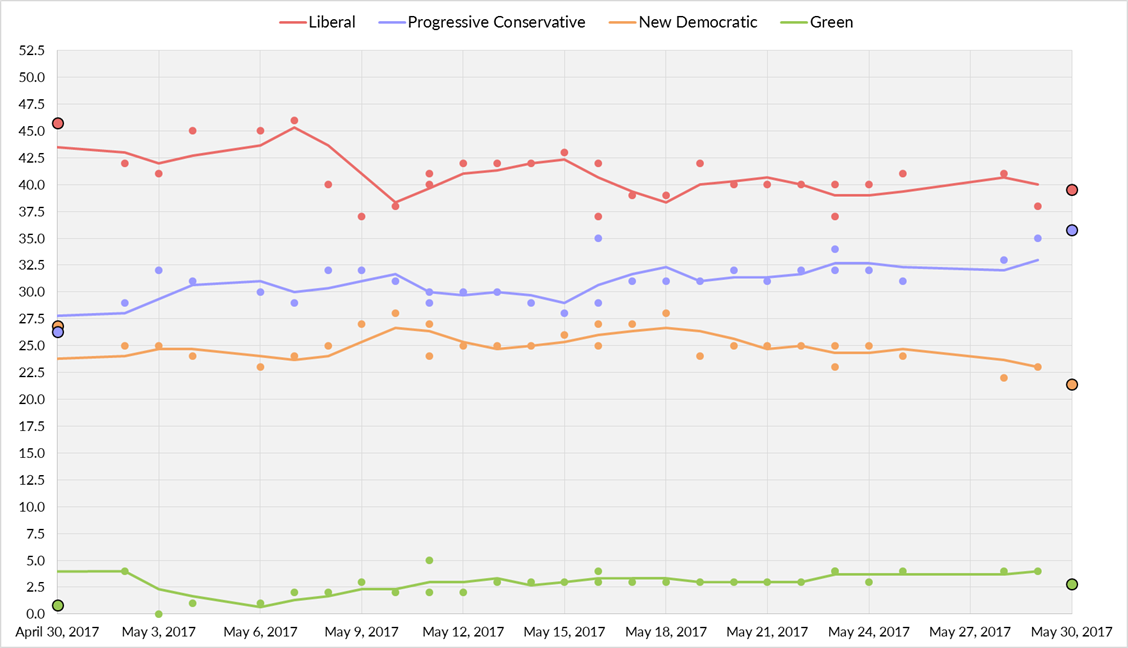

Polling Firm	Last Day of Polling	Link	Liberal	PC	NDP	Green
Forum Research	May 29, 2017		38	35	23	4
Mainstreet Research	May 28, 2017		41	33	22	4
Corporate Research Associates	May 25, 2017		41	31	24	4
Corporate Research Associates	May 24, 2017		40	32	25	3
Mainstreet Research	May 23, 2017		37	34	25	4
Corporate Research Associates	May 23, 2017		40	32	23	4
Corporate Research Associates	May 22, 2017		40	32	25	3
Corporate Research Associates	May 21, 2017		40	31	25	3
Corporate Research Associates	May 20, 2017		40	32	25	3
Corporate Research Associates	May 19, 2017		42	31	24	3
Corporate Research Associates	May 18, 2017		39	31	28	3
Corporate Research Associates	May 17, 2017		39	31	27	3
Forum Research	May 16, 2017		37	35	25	4
Corporate Research Associates	May 16, 2017		42	29	27	3
Corporate Research Associates	May 15, 2017		43	28	26	3
Corporate Research Associates	May 14, 2017		42	29	25	3
Corporate Research Associates	May 13, 2017		42	30	25	3
Corporate Research Associates	May 12, 2017		42	30	25	2
Mainstreet Research	May 11, 2017		40	30	24	5
Corporate Research Associates	May 11, 2017		41	29	27	2
Corporate Research Associates	May 10, 2017		38	31	28	2
Corporate Research Associates	May 9, 2017		37	32	27	3
Corporate Research Associates	May 8, 2017		40	32	25	2
Corporate Research Associates	May 7, 2017		46	29	24	2
Corporate Research Associates	May 6, 2017		45	30	23	1
Corporate Research Associates	May 4, 2017		45	31	24	1
Forum Research	May 3, 2017		41	32	25	
Mainstreet Research	May 2, 2017		42	29	25	4
MQO Research	April 10, 2017		43	27	24	3
Corporate Research Associates	March 1, 2017		44	28	23	5
MQO Research	January 15, 2017		58	21	18	3
Corporate Research Associates	November 29, 2016		56	20	19	4
MQO Research	October 15, 2016		53	25	16	5
Corporate Research Associates	August 31, 2016		56	22	19	2
MQO Research	July 19, 2016		63	17	16	3
Corporate Research Associates	May 31, 2016		59	21	18	2
MQO Research	April 9, 2016		59	17	20	3
Corporate Research Associates	March 1, 2016		56	23	16	5
Corporate Research Associates	December 1, 2015		64	17	17	2
Corporate Research Associates	September 2, 2015		50	20	28	2
Corporate Research Associates	June 1, 2015		50	19	27	3
Corporate Research Associates	February 28, 2015		58	20	18	3
Corporate Research Associates	November 26, 2014		64	18	15	3
Corporate Research Associates	September 1, 2014		62	20	14	3
Corporate Research Associates	May 27, 2014		57	21	19	3
Corporate Research Associates	February 28, 2014		60	20	18	2
Corporate Research Associates	November 28, 2013		58	19	19	3
Election 2013	October 8, 2013	HTML	45.71	26.31	26.84	0.85
