= Sydney-Membertou =

Provincial electoral district in Nova Scotia, Canada

Nova Scotia electoral district

Provincial electoral district
- Legislature: Nova Scotia House of Assembly
MLA
Derek Mombourquette
Liberal
- District created: 2012
- First contested: 2013
- Last contested: 2024

Demographics
- Area (km²): 21
- Census division: Cape Breton County
- Census subdivision(s): Cape Breton Regional Municipality, Membertou 28B

Sydney-Membertou is a provincial electoral district in Nova Scotia, Canada, that elects one member of the Nova Scotia House of Assembly. It was created in 2012 as Sydney-Whtiney Pier from 79% of Cape Breton Nova and 59% of Cape Breton South. Following the 2019 redistribution, the riding lost Whitney Pier to Cape Breton Centre-Whitney Pier, while gaining some territory from Sydney River-Mira-Louisbourg, and was renamed Sydney-Membertou.

The district contains the communities of Sydney, Grand Lake Road, Mira Road, Sydney River, Prime Brook, and the Membertou 28B Indian reserve.

The riding is represented by Derek Mombourquette of the Nova Scotia Liberal Party. He won the seat in a byelection on July 14, 2015, following the resignation of MLA Gordie Gosse.

== Members of the Legislative Assembly ==
This riding has elected the following members of the Legislative Assembly:

Sydney-Membertou
Legislature	Years	Member	Party
Sydney-Whtiney Pier created from Cape Breton Nova and Cape Breton South
62nd	2013–2015	Gordie Gosse	New Democratic
62nd	2015–2017	Derek Mombourquette	Liberal
63rd	2017–2021	Derek Mombourquette	Liberal
Sydney-Membertou
64th	2021–2024	Derek Mombourquette	Liberal
65th	2024–present	Derek Mombourquette	Liberal

== Election results ==
=== 2024 ===
2024 Nova Scotia general election
Party	Candidate	Votes	%	±%
Liberal	Derek Mombourquette	3,691	45.05	-9.22
Progressive Conservative	Brian MacArthur	2,905	35.45	+18.00
New Democratic	Alison Aho	1,513	18.46	-9.82
Green	Steven McGrath	85	1.04	–
Total valid votes		8,194		
Total rejected ballots		54		
Turnout		8,248	53.01	
Eligible voters		15,558		
Liberal hold		Swing		
Source: Elections Nova Scotia

=== 2021 ===
2021 Nova Scotia general election
Party	Candidate	Votes	%	±%	Expenditures
Liberal	Derek Mombourquette	4,561	54.27	+16.85	$56,323.12
New Democratic	Madonna Doucette	2,377	28.28	-4.07	$46,873.89
Progressive Conservative	Pauline Singer	1,467	17.45	-12.78	$39,112.21
Total valid votes/expense limit		8,405	99.44	–	$92,135.10
Total rejected ballots		47	0.56		
Turnout		8,452	52.36		
Eligible voters		16,142			
Liberal hold		Swing		+10.46	
Source: Elections Nova Scotia

2017 provincial election redistributed results
Party	Vote	%
Liberal	3,257	37.42
New Democratic	2,816	32.35
Progressive Conservative	2,632	30.24

=== 2017 ===
2017 Nova Scotia general election
Party	Candidate	Votes	%	±%
Liberal	Derek Mombourquette	3,656	38.72	-10.33
New Democratic	Madonna Doucette	3,496	37.03	+6.88
Progressive Conservative	Laurie MacIntosh	2,290	24.25	+3.45
Total valid votes		9,442	100.0	
Total rejected ballots		62	0.65	
Turnout		9,504	52.80	
Eligible voters		18,001		
Liberal hold		Swing		-8.61
Source: Elections Nova Scotia

=== 2015 by-election ===
Nova Scotia provincial by-election, July 14, 2015: Sydney-Whitney Pier On the resignation of Gordie Gosse
Party	Candidate	Votes	%	±%
Liberal	Derek Mombourquette	3,794	49.05	+5.02
New Democratic	Madonna Doucette	2,332	30.15	-19.22
Progressive Conservative	Brian E. MacArthur	1,609	20.80	+14.20
Total valid votes		7,735	99.55	
Total rejected ballots		35	0.45	
Turnout		7,770	42.60	
Electors on the lists		18,238		
Liberal gain from New Democratic		Swing		+12.12
Source: Elections Nova Scotia

=== 2013 ===
2013 Nova Scotia general election: Sydney-Whitney Pier
Party	Candidate	Votes	%	±%
New Democratic	Gordie Gosse	5,084	49.37	−5.25
Liberal	Derek Mombourquette	4,534	44.03	+8.80
Progressive Conservative	Leslie MacPhee	680	6.60	−1.79
Total valid votes		10,298	99.40	
Total rejected ballots		62	0.60	
Turnout		10,360	57.86	
Electors on the lists		17,906	–	
New Democratic hold		Swing		−7.03
Source: Elections Nova Scotia

2009 Nova Scotia general election redistributed results
Party	Vote	%
New Democratic Party	5,774	54.62
Liberal	3,724	35.23
Progressive Conservative	887	8.39
Green	186	1.76

== See also ==
- List of Nova Scotia provincial electoral districts
- Canadian provincial electoral districts
