= Cape Breton Nova =

Former provincial electoral district in Nova Scotia, Canada

Nova Scotia electoral district

Defunct provincial electoral district
- Legislature: Nova Scotia House of Assembly
- District created: 1956
- District abolished: 2013
- Last contested: 2009

Demographics
- Population (2011): 12,820
- Electors: 10,748
- Census division: Cape Breton Regional Municipality
- Census subdivision: Sydney

Cape Breton Nova is a former provincial electoral district in Nova Scotia, Canada, which existed between 1956 and 2013. It elected one member to the Nova Scotia House of Assembly. In its last configuration, the district included the northern parts of Sydney including Whitney Pier, as well as a small area of Cape Breton County, all within the Cape Breton Regional Municipality.

The district was created in 1956. In 1993, it gained the Ashby area between Welton Street and Ashby Road from Cape Breton South and the Grand Lake Road area from Cape Breton West. It lost the Scotchtown and River Ryan/Lingan areas to Cape Breton Centre. In 2003, it lost the New Victoria area and gained part of northern Sydney. In 2013, Cape Breton Nova was absorbed by Cape Breton Centre, Sydney River-Mira-Louisbourg, and Sydney-Whitney Pier.

== Members of the Legislative Assembly ==
The electoral district was represented by the following members of the Legislative Assembly:

Cape Breton Nova
Legislature	Years	Member	Party
46th	1956–1960	Percy Gaum	Progressive Conservative
47th	1960–1963	Percy Gaum	Progressive Conservative
48th	1963–1967	Percy Gaum	Progressive Conservative
49th	1967–1970	Percy Gaum	Progressive Conservative
50th	1970–1974	Paul MacEwan	New Democratic
51st	1974–1978	Paul MacEwan	New Democratic
52nd	1978–1980	Paul MacEwan	New Democratic
52nd	1980–1981	Paul MacEwan	Labour
53rd	1981–1984	Paul MacEwan	Labour
54th	1984–1988	Paul MacEwan	Labour
55th	1988–1990	Paul MacEwan	Labour
55th	1990–1993	Paul MacEwan	Liberal
56th	1993–1998	Paul MacEwan	Liberal
57th	1998–1999	Paul MacEwan	Liberal
58th	1999–2003	Paul MacEwan	Liberal
59th	2003–2006	Gordie Gosse	New Democratic
60th	2006–2009	Gordie Gosse	New Democratic
61st	2009–2013	Gordie Gosse	New Democratic
District dissolved into Sydney River-Mira-Louisbourg (2013–2021), and Sydney-Whitney Pier (2013-2021)

== Election results ==
=== 2009 ===
2009 Nova Scotia general election
Party	Candidate	Votes	%	±%
New Democratic	Gordie Gosse	4,735	71.07%	10.15%
Liberal	Donnie Morrison	1,549	23.25%	-2.08%
Progressive Conservative	Cory Hann	276	4.14%	-7.93%
Green	Michael P. Milburn	102	1.53%	-0.15%
Total		6,662	–	
Source(s) Source: Nova Scotia Legislature (2024). "Electoral History for Cape Breton Nova" (PDF). nslegislature.ca.

=== 2006 ===
2006 Nova Scotia general election
Party	Candidate	Votes	%	±%
New Democratic	Gordie Gosse	4,315	60.92%	15.31%
Liberal	Mel Crowe	1,794	25.33%	-19.22%
Progressive Conservative	Todd Marsman	855	12.07%	2.22%
Green	Chris Milburn	119	1.68%	–
Total		7,083	–	
Source(s) Source: Nova Scotia Legislature (2024). "Electoral History for Cape Breton Nova" (PDF). nslegislature.ca.

=== 2003 ===
2003 Nova Scotia general election
Party	Candidate	Votes	%	±%
New Democratic	Gordie Gosse	3,168	45.61%	2.19%
Liberal	Mel Crowe	3,094	44.54%	-8.90%
Progressive Conservative	Todd Marsman	684	9.85%	6.71%
Total		6,946	–	
Source(s) Source: Nova Scotia Legislature (2024). "Electoral History for Cape Breton Nova" (PDF). nslegislature.ca.

=== 1999 ===
1999 Nova Scotia general election
Party	Candidate	Votes	%	±%
Liberal	Paul MacEwan	4,004	53.44%	-0.54%
New Democratic	Gordie Gosse	3,253	43.42%	1.67%
Progressive Conservative	Harold Dorrington	235	3.14%	-1.13%
Total		7,492	–	
Source(s) Source: Nova Scotia Legislature (2024). "Electoral History for Cape Breton Nova" (PDF). nslegislature.ca. Nova Scotia, Chief Electoral Officer (1999). Returns of the General Election for the House of Assembly, Thirty-Fifth General Election (Report). Elections Nova Scotia.

=== 1998 ===
1998 Nova Scotia general election
Party	Candidate	Votes	%	±%
Liberal	Paul MacEwan	3,944	53.98%	-28.24%
New Democratic	Lou Surette	3,050	41.75%	29.31%
Progressive Conservative	Walter Hagen	312	4.27%	-1.07%
Total		7,306	–	
Source(s) Source: Nova Scotia Legislature (2024). "Electoral History for Cape Breton Nova" (PDF). nslegislature.ca.

=== 1993 ===
1993 Nova Scotia general election
Party	Candidate	Votes	%	±%
Liberal	Paul MacEwan	6,816	82.22%	47.71%
New Democratic	Blair Riley	1,031	12.44%	3.34%
Progressive Conservative	Joe Currie	443	5.34%	-8.71%
Total		8,290	–	
Source(s) Source: Nova Scotia Legislature (2024). "Electoral History for Cape Breton Nova" (PDF). nslegislature.ca. Nova Scotia, Chief Electoral Officer (1993). Returns of the General Election for the House of Assembly, Thirty-Third General Election (PDF) (Report). Queen's Printer. Archived from the original (PDF) on June 18, 2018.

=== 1988 ===
1988 Nova Scotia general election
Party	Candidate	Votes	%	±%
Labour	Paul MacEwan	3,194	42.34%	-10.01%
Liberal	Dan MacRury	2,603	34.51%	19.94%
Progressive Conservative	Joe Burke	1,060	14.05%	-9.82%
New Democratic	Terry Crawley	686	9.09%	-0.11%
Total		7,543	–	
Source(s) Source: Nova Scotia Legislature (2024). "Electoral History for Cape Breton Nova" (PDF). nslegislature.ca. Nova Scotia, Chief Electoral Officer (1988). Returns of the General Election for the House of Assembly, Thirty-Second General Election (PDF) (Report). Queen's Printer. Archived from the original (PDF) on July 7, 2018.

=== 1984 ===
1984 Nova Scotia general election
Party	Candidate	Votes	%	±%
Labour	Paul MacEwan	3,832	52.36%	4.16%
Progressive Conservative	Jim Neville	1,747	23.87%	4.45%
Liberal	John Ryan	1,066	14.56%	-15.56%
New Democratic	Alex MacIsaac	674	9.21%	6.95%
Total		7,319	–	
Source(s) Source: Nova Scotia Legislature (2024). "Electoral History for Cape Breton Nova" (PDF). nslegislature.ca. Nova Scotia, Chief Electoral Officer (1984). Returns of the General Election for the House of Assembly, Thirty-First General Election (PDF) (Report). Queen's Printer. Archived from the original (PDF) on July 31, 2017.

=== 1981 ===
1981 Nova Scotia general election
Party	Candidate	Votes	%	±%
Labour	Paul MacEwan	3,691	48.20%	–
Liberal	Earle O. Tubrett	2,307	30.13%	-4.47%
Progressive Conservative	Russell Brake	1,487	19.42%	1.29%
New Democratic	Tony Gale	173	2.26%	-45.02%
Total		7,658	–	
Source(s) Source: Nova Scotia Legislature (2024). "Electoral History for Cape Breton Nova" (PDF). nslegislature.ca. Nova Scotia, Chief Electoral Officer (1981). Returns of the General Election for the House of Assembly, Thirtieth General Election (PDF) (Report). Queen's Printer. Archived from the original (PDF) on July 31, 2017.

=== 1978 ===
1978 Nova Scotia general election
Party	Candidate	Votes	%	±%
New Democratic	Paul MacEwan	3,918	47.28%	-4.07%
Liberal	Earle O. Tubrett	2,867	34.60%	17.41%
Progressive Conservative	Percy Gaum	1,502	18.12%	-13.34%
Total		8,287	–	
Source(s) Source: Nova Scotia Legislature (2024). "Electoral History for Cape Breton Nova" (PDF). nslegislature.ca. Nova Scotia, Chief Electoral Officer (1978). Returns of the General Election for the House of Assembly, Twenty-Ninth General Election (PDF) (Report). Queen's Printer. Archived from the original (PDF) on June 18, 2018.

=== 1974 ===
1974 Nova Scotia general election
Party	Candidate	Votes	%	±%
New Democratic	Paul MacEwan	3,809	51.35%	8.00%
Progressive Conservative	Percy Gaum	2,334	31.46%	-10.98%
Liberal	Ronald F. DiPenta	1,275	17.19%	2.98%
Total		7,418	–	
Source(s) Source: Nova Scotia Legislature (2024). "Electoral History for Cape Breton Nova" (PDF). nslegislature.ca. Nova Scotia, Chief Electoral Officer (1974). Returns of the General Election for the House of Assembly, Twenty-Eighth General Election (PDF) (Report). Queen's Printer. Archived from the original (PDF) on June 18, 2018.

=== 1970 ===
1970 Nova Scotia general election
Party	Candidate	Votes	%	±%
New Democratic	Paul MacEwan	2,927	43.35%	20.48%
Progressive Conservative	Percy Gaum	2,866	42.45%	-4.68%
Liberal	Ronald Felix DiPenta	959	14.20%	-15.80%
Total		6,752	–	
Source(s) Source: Nova Scotia Legislature (2024). "Electoral History for Cape Breton Nova" (PDF). nslegislature.ca. Nova Scotia, Legislative Assembly (1970). Returns of the General Election for the House of Assembly, 1970 (PDF) (Report). Queen's Printer. Archived from the original (PDF) on July 25, 2018.

=== 1967 ===
1967 Nova Scotia general election
Party	Candidate	Votes	%	±%
Progressive Conservative	Percy Gaum	2,873	47.13%	-6.24%
Liberal	Tom Miller	1,829	30.00%	10.64%
New Democratic	Paul MacEwan	1,394	22.87%	-4.41%
Total		6,096	–	
Source(s) Source: Nova Scotia Legislature (2024). "Electoral History for Cape Breton Nova" (PDF). nslegislature.ca. Nova Scotia Legislature (1967). Returns of the General Election for the House of Assembly (PDF) (Report). Queen's Printer. Archived from the original (PDF) on July 25, 2018.

=== 1963 ===
1963 Nova Scotia general election
Party	Candidate	Votes	%	±%
Progressive Conservative	Percy Gaum	3,344	53.37%	16.44%
New Democratic	Albert Ollie Wilson	1,709	27.27%	-5.17%
Liberal	Charles Richard Sigut	1,213	19.36%	-11.27%
Total		6,266	–	
Source(s) Source: Nova Scotia Legislature (2024). "Electoral History for Cape Breton Nova" (PDF). nslegislature.ca. Nova Scotia Legislature (1963). Returns of the General Election for the House of Assembly (PDF) (Report). Queen's Printer. Archived from the original (PDF) on July 25, 2018.

=== 1960 ===
1960 Nova Scotia general election
Party	Candidate	Votes	%	±%
Progressive Conservative	Percy Gaum	2,525	36.93%	-2.48%
Co-operative Commonwealth	Albert Ollie Wilson	2,218	32.44%	9.93%
Liberal	Wilfred Gillis	2,094	30.63%	4.95%
Total		6,837	–	
Source(s) Source: Nova Scotia Legislature (2024). "Electoral History for Cape Breton Nova" (PDF). nslegislature.ca. Nova Scotia Legislature (1960). Returns of the General Election for the House of Assembly (PDF) (Report). Queen's Printer. Archived from the original (PDF) on July 25, 2018.

=== 1956 ===
1956 Nova Scotia general election
Party	Candidate	Votes	%	±%
Progressive Conservative	Percy Gaum	2,582	39.41%	–
Liberal	Gus Brown	1,682	25.68%	–
Co-operative Commonwealth	John A. Chisholm	1,475	22.52%	–
Independent Liberal	Charles O'Connell	812	12.40%	–
Total		6,551	–	
Source(s) Source: Nova Scotia Legislature (2024). "Electoral History for Cape Breton Nova" (PDF). nslegislature.ca. Nova Scotia Legislature (1956). Returns of the General Election for the House of Assembly (PDF) (Report). Queen's Printer. Archived from the original (PDF) on September 10, 2018.

== See also ==
- List of Nova Scotia provincial electoral districts
- Canadian provincial electoral districts
