= Gordon Wilson (Nova Scotia politician) =

Canadian politician

The Honourable Gordon Wilson ECNS

Member of the Nova Scotia House of Assembly for Clare-Digby
- In office October 8, 2013 – July 17, 2021
- Preceded by: Riding Established
- Succeeded by: riding redistributed

Personal details
- Born: Gordon Lloyd Wilson; 1955
- Party: Liberal

Gordon Lloyd Wilson (born 1955) is a Canadian politician, who was elected to the Nova Scotia House of Assembly in the 2013 provincial election. A member of the Nova Scotia Liberal Party, he represented the electoral district of Clare-Digby until his retirement from politics in 2021.

On April 24, 2019, Wilson was appointed to the Executive Council of Nova Scotia as Minister of Environment.

== Electoral record ==
2017 Nova Scotia general election: Clare-Digby
Party	Candidate	Votes	%	±%
Liberal	Gordon Wilson	4,044	50.49	-4.19
Progressive Conservative	Normand Cormier	2,283	28.50	-2.58
New Democratic	Harold Neil	1,682	21.00	+12.01

2013 Nova Scotia general election, Clare-Digby
Party	Candidate	Votes	%	±%
Liberal	Gordon Wilson	5,122	54.68	N/A
Progressive Conservative	Paul Emile LeBlanc	2,911	31.08	N/A
New Democratic Party	Dean Kenley	842	8.99	N/A
Independent	Ian Thurber	492	5.25	N/A
