= 2013 Nova Scotia general election =

Canadian provincial election

- October 8, 2013

51 seats in the Nova Scotia House of Assembly 26 seats needed for a majority
- Opinion polls
- Turnout: 59.08%
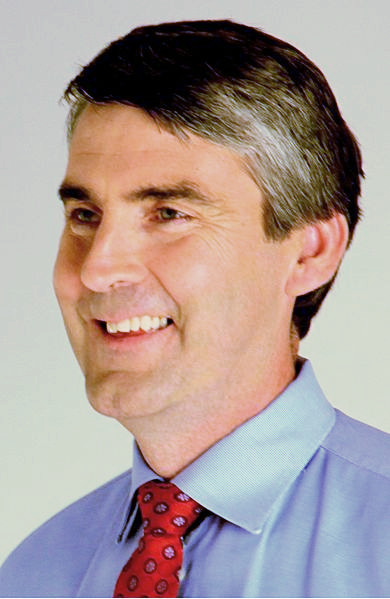

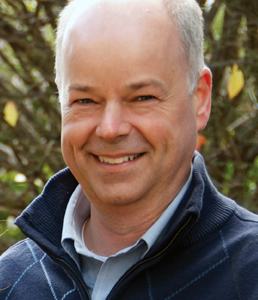

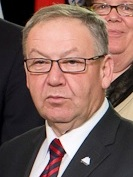
	Majority party	Minority party	Third party
Leader	Stephen McNeil	Jamie Baillie	Darrell Dexter
Party	Liberal	Progressive Conservative	New Democratic
Leader since	April 28, 2007	October 26, 2010	June 2, 2002
Leader's seat	Annapolis	Cumberland South	Cole Harbour ran in Cole Harbour-Portland Valley (lost)
Last election	11 seats, 27.20%	10 seats, 24.54%	31 seats, 45.24%
Seats before	12	7	31
Seats won	33	11	7
Seat change	▲21	▲4	▼24
Popular vote	190,112	109,452	111,622
Percentage	45.71%	26.31%	26.84%
Swing	▲18.51pp	▲1.77pp	▼18.40pp
- Popular vote by riding. As this is an FPTP election, seat totals are not determined by popular vote, but instead via results by each riding. Riding names are listed at the bottom of the map.
Premier before election
Darrell Dexter
New Democratic
Premier after election
Stephen McNeil
Liberal

The 2013 Nova Scotia general election was held on October 8, 2013, to elect members to the Nova Scotia House of Assembly.

The result of the election was a Liberal victory under the leadership of Stephen McNeil, with the party winning its first election since 1998. The Progressive Conservatives, under the leadership of Jamie Baillie, improved on their 2009 results and formed the Official Opposition, despite winning fewer votes than the New Democratic Party (NDP). The NDP, which had won power for the first time in 2009 under the leadership of Darrell Dexter was reduced to third place and became only the second one-term government in the province's history, and the first since 1882. Dexter himself was defeated in Cole Harbour-Portland Valley by Liberal candidate Tony Ince.

== Timeline ==
- June 24, 2009 – The New Democratic Party under Darrell Dexter win 31 out of 52 seats. The Progressive Conservatives are reduced to 10 seats and Rodney MacDonald announces that he will step down as leader. Karen Casey is named as interim leader.
- September 4, 2009 – Antigonish MLA Angus MacIsaac resigns his seat, citing family reasons.
- September 10, 2009 – Former Premier Rodney MacDonald resigns his Inverness seat in the legislature.
- October 20, 2009 – By-elections are held in Inverness and Antigonish. PC candidate Allan MacMaster and NDP candidate Maurice Smith are elected, respectively.
- February 9, 2010 – Richard Hurlburt resigns from the legislature following revelations that he had spent his constituency allowance on a generator and a 40" television, which together cost over $11,000.
- March 11, 2010 – Dave Wilson resigns from the legislature and is later charged and pleaded guilty.
- March 25, 2010 – Trevor Zinck is suspended from the NDP caucus over problems with his constituency expenses.
- June 22, 2010 – Two byelections are held to replace Hurlburt and Wilson in Yarmouth and Glace Bay, respectively. Zach Churchill is elected in Yarmouth and Geoff MacLellan is elected in Glace Bay.
- August 16, 2010 – Karen Casey announces her resignation as interim leader of the Progressive Conservatives.
- August 18, 2010 – Jamie Baillie is chosen as leader of the Progressive Conservative Party.
- October 26, 2010 – Jamie Baillie wins a byelection and represents the constituency of Cumberland South.
- January 10, 2011 – PC MLA Karen Casey crosses the floor to join the Liberal caucus.
- February 14, 2011 – Trevor Zinck is announced as one of four people facing criminal charges in connection with the RCMP investigation into 2010s MLA expense scandal. Zinck is charged with fraud exceeding $5,000, breach of trust by a public officer, and 2 counts of theft over $5,000.
- March 25, 2011 – Cape Breton North PC MLA Cecil Clarke resigns his seat to run in the 2011 federal election.
- June 21, 2011 – PC candidate Eddie Orrell wins the by-election in Cape Breton North.
- April 19, 2012 – Former MLA Dave Wilson is sentenced to 9 months in jail and to a period of 18 months probation for his role in the expenses scandal.
- June 5, 2012 – The Atlantica Party is deregistered by Elections Nova Scotia.
- July 27, 2012 – Former MLA Richard Hurlburt is sentenced to 12 months of house arrest, followed by 12 months of probation for his role in the expenses scandal.
- May 29, 2013 – Manning MacDonald resigns his seat in the legislature as MLA for Cape Breton South.
- June 19, 2013 – Trevor Zinck resigns his seat in the legislature after he pleaded guilty to charges of fraud and breach of trust.
- September 7, 2013 – Premier Darrell Dexter calls a general election for October 8, 2013.

== Redistribution of ridings ==
In September 2012, the Electoral Boundaries Commission released its report which recommended changing the number of electoral districts from 52 to 51, including the abolition of the four protected districts of Argyle, Clare, Preston and Richmond. That move sparked significant controversy and debate. The Nova Scotia Legislature subsequently passed An Act to Amend Chapter 1 (1992 Supplement) of the Revised Statutes, 1989, the House of Assembly Act, SNS 2012, c. 61 , taking effect upon the next election.

Several amendments were passed before the election:

- to make minor boundary adjustments:

- An Act to Make Various Administrative Amendments to the Statutes of Nova Scotia, SNS 2013, c. 10, s. 4

- to rename certain electoral districts:

- An Act to Amend Chapter 61 of the Acts of 2012, An Act to Amend Chapter 1 (1992 Supplement) of the Revised Statutes, 1989, the House of Assembly Act, SNS 2013, c. 19

- An Act to Amend Chapter 61 of the Acts of 2012, An Act to Amend Chapter 1 (1992 Supplement) of the Revised Statutes, 1989, the House of Assembly Act, SNS 2013, c. 20

- An Act to Amend Chapter 61 of the Acts of 2012, An Act to Amend Chapter 1 (1992 Supplement) of the Revised Statutes, 1989, the House of Assembly Act, SNS 2013, c. 21

- An Act to Amend Chapter 61 of the Acts of 2012, An Act to Amend Chapter 1 (1992 Supplement) of the Revised Statutes, 1989, the House of Assembly Act, SNS 2013, c. 22

- An Act to Amend Chapter 61 of the Acts of 2012, An Act to Amend Chapter 1 (1992 Supplement) of the Revised Statutes, 1989, the House of Assembly Act, SNS 2013, c. 23

The net effect of the above changes is summarized thus:

Abolished ridings	New ridings
Renaming of districts
Argyle	Argyle-Barrington
Bedford-Birch Cove	Bedford
Cape Breton North	Northside-Westmount
Cape Breton West	Sydney River-Mira-Louisbourg
Guysborough-Sheet Harbour	Guysborough–Eastern Shore–Tracadie
Halifax Citadel	Halifax Citadel-Sable Island
Halifax Clayton Park	Clayton Park West
Halifax Fairview	Halifax Armdale
Preston	Preston-Dartmouth
Richmond	Cape Breton-Richmond
Truro-Bible Hill	Truro–Bible Hill–Millbrook–Salmon River
New districts
	Fairview-Clayton Park (Note: From parts of Halifax Fairview and Halifax Clayton Park.)
Reorganization of districts
Annapolis; Clare; Digby-Annapolis	Annapolis; Clare-Digby
Cole Harbour; Dartmouth South-Portland Valley	Cole Harbour-Portland Valley; Dartmouth South
Division of districts
Hammonds Plains-Upper Sackville	Hammonds Plains-Lucasville; Sackville-Beaver Bank
Merger of districts
Cape Breton Nova; Cape Breton South	Sydney-Whitney Pier
Queens; Shelburne	Queens-Shelburne

== Campaign ==
The election campaign began the week after Labour Day, when the legislature would normally have been expected to return to work, had there been no election campaign. As criticism or defence of government policy would dominate the agenda, and by convention electoral mandates are understood to last about four years, despite a lack of fixed election dates, the timing was not controversial.

The Muskrat Falls or Lower Churchill Project, its associated Maritime Link, and electricity policy generally, immediately emerged as the key issue in the early campaign. . Liberals emphasized Nova Scotia Power's (NSPI) dominance of power generation, and its ability to exclude alternatives through its near-monopoly ownership of the distribution network, covering 129/130 Nova Scotians. They also promised to remove a conservation charge, named for demand response programs that never materialized (though many passive conservation programs run by Efficiency Nova Scotia did prove effective) – instead proposing that NSPI pay for it from its return. Liberals and Conservatives criticized NSPI's unaccountable 9.2% guaranteed rate of return even for unwise investments. Conservatives acknowledged that it was under pressure to meet a tough renewable standard (which they would relax) but also promised to freeze rates. The NDP government continued to defend Muskrat Falls as the only viable alternative to replace coal-fired power, even though this project was before the Nova Scotia Utilities Review Board as of the election call, remained unchanged and this was reflected in their campaign materials – they criticized the Liberal plan as likely to lead to higher power rates. The basis for these criticisms was unclear. However, a similar attempt to open generation competition in New Brunswick failed, in part because New Brunswick Power retained monopoly control of the distribution and transmission network, which intimidates competitors and makes it easy in practice to exclude them.

Other issues in the campaign:

- A proposed passenger ferry from Yarmouth, Nova Scotia to Portland, Maine, re-instituting summer service that ran for decades until the 1990s, replacing a car-focused service that ran to Bar Harbor, Maine until the NDP government cancelled it. This was of particular interest to South Shore candidates, especially Yarmouth. Associated issues include the collapse of all public transit on the South Shore (with the withdrawal of TryTown from operating public buses from Yarmouth to Halifax) and a general lack of transport strategy, that could leave some of the 130,000 passengers per year stranded. It remained unclear as of election time whether an announced deal to resume service May 1, 2014, had held, and what other transport policy applied Darrell Dexter had referred to stories from Yarmouth about the impact of the loss of ferries a "mythology" which effectively made this a campaign issue before the campaign had begun.

== Results ==
↓
33	11	7
Liberal	Progressive Conservative	New Democratic

Summary of the 2013 Nova Scotia House of Assembly election
Party	Leader	Candidates	Votes				Seats		
Party	Leader	Candidates	#	±	%	Change (pp)	2009	2013	±
Liberal	Stephen McNeil	51	190,112	77,952	45.71	18.51	11	33 / 51	22▲
New Democratic	Darrell Dexter	51	111,622	(74,934)	26.84	-18.41	31	7 / 51	24▼
Progressive Conservative	Jamie Baillie	51	109,452	8,249	26.31	1.77	10	11 / 51	1▲
Green	John Percy	16	3,528	(6,108)	0.85	-1.49			
Independent		7	1,238	(1,558)	0.30	-0.38			
Total		176	415,952		100.00%				
Rejected ballots			3,139	1,619▲					
Turnout			419,091	5,220▲	59.08%	1.17▲			
Registered voters			709,360	5,315▼					

=== Results by region ===
Party name		HRM	C.B.	Valley	S. Shore	Fundy	Central	Total
Parties winning seats in the legislature
New Democratic Party	Seats:	2	2	-	2	1	-	7
New Democratic Party	Popular vote:	31.29%	25.16%	17.40%	24.68%	26.26%	31.51%	26.84%
Liberal	Seats:	18	3	4	3	3	2	33
Liberal	Popular vote:	48.72%	46.89%	52.02%	43.55%	40.68%	28.71%	45.71%
Progressive Conservative	Seats:	-	3	2	1	2	3	11
Progressive Conservative	Popular vote:	18.62%	27.69%	27.58%	30.76%	32.01%	39.78%	26.31%
Parties not winning seats in the legislature
Green	Popular vote:	0.98%	0.00%	2.11%	1.01%	1.05%	0.00%	0.85%
Independents	Popular vote:	0.39%	0.26%	0.89%	0.00%	0.00%	0.00%	0.3%
Total seats:		20	8	6	6	6	5	51

=== Synopsis of results ===
Results by riding - 2013 Nova Scotia general election
Riding	Winning party							Turnout (Note: including spoilt ballots)	Votes					
Riding	2009 (Redist.) (Note: Effect of 2012 restribution on previous election results, per "Transposition of Votes from the 2009 Provincial General Election and Subsequent By-Elections to 2012 Electoral District Boundaries" (PDF). Elections Nova Scotia.)	1st place	Votes	Share	Margin #	Margin %	2nd place	Turnout	Lib	NDP	PC	Grn	Ind	Total
Annapolis	Lib	Lib	7,710	75.88%	6,320	62.20%	PC	65.47%	7,710	834	1,390	227	–	10,161
Antigonish	NDP	Lib	3,882	42.78%	1,014	11.17%	PC	67.05%	3,882	2,324	2,868	–	–	9,074
Argyle-Barrington	PC	PC	3,935	54.69%	1,030	14.32%	Lib	60.00%	2,905	355	3,935	–	–	7,195
Bedford	Lib	Lib	6,081	60.66%	4,055	40.45%	PC	56.92%	6,081	1,701	2,026	217	–	10,025
Cape Breton Centre	NDP	NDP	3,440	45.29%	158	2.08%	Lib	58.99%	3,282	3,440	873	–	–	7,595
Cape Breton-Richmond	Lib	Lib	4,369	56.51%	2,673	34.57%	PC	71.62%	4,369	1,667	1,696	–	–	7,732
Chester-St. Margaret's	NDP	NDP	3,341	35.25%	148	1.56%	PC	65.31%	2,943	3,341	3,193	–	–	9,477
Clare-Digby	Lib	Lib	5,122	54.68%	2,211	23.60%	PC	68.01%	5,122	842	2,911	–	492	9,367
Clayton Park West	Lib	Lib	5,929	67.81%	4,414	50.49%	NDP	53.06%	5,929	1,515	1,299	–	–	8,743
Colchester-Musquodoboit Valley	NDP	PC	3,304	42.27%	1,011	12.93%	NDP	58.45%	2,220	2,293	3,304	–	–	7,817
Colchester North	PC	Lib	5,003	61.00%	2,841	34.64%	PC	59.72%	5,003	1,037	2,162	–	–	8,202
Cole Harbour-Eastern Passage	NDP	Lib	3,057	40.62%	143	1.90%	NDP	54.61%	3,057	2,914	1,555	–	–	7,526
Cole Harbour-Portland Valley	NDP	Lib	4,002	41.04%	21	0.22%	NDP	57.55%	4,002	3,981	1,769	–	–	9,752
Cumberland North	NDP	Lib	2,944	39.74%	732	9.88%	PC	59.33%	2,944	1,974	2,212	279	–	7,409
Cumberland South	PC	PC	3,655	50.96%	771	10.75%	Lib	67.13%	2,884	486 (Note: Larry Duchesne was previously a member of the Legislative Assembly of Prince Edward Island and leader of the Prince Edward Island New Democratic Party.)	3,655	147	–	7,172
Dartmouth East	Lib	Lib	5,469	63.85%	3,540	41.33%	NDP	59.93%	5,469	1,929	1,167	–	–	8,565
Dartmouth North	NDP	Lib	2,953	44.06%	933	13.92%	NDP	45.55%	2,953	2,020	1,729	–	–	6,702
Dartmouth South	NDP	Lib	4,049	46.24%	1,131	12.92%	NDP	55.82%	4,049	2,918	1,612	–	178	8,757
Eastern Shore	NDP	Lib	3,770	52.99%	1,848	25.97%	NDP	60.87%	3,770	1,922	1,423	–	–	7,115
Fairview-Clayton Park	NDP	Lib	3,364	46.43%	1,090	15.04%	NDP	45.98%	3,364	2,274	1,294	177	136	7,245
Glace Bay	Lib	Lib	5,547	80.36%	4,546	65.86%	NDP	56.01%	5,547	1,001	355	–	–	6,903
Guysborough–Eastern Shore–Tracadie	NDP	Lib	2,876	40.00%	509	7.08%	NDP	71.68%	2,876	2,367	1,947	–	–	7,190
Halifax Armdale	NDP	Lib	3,208	49.57%	1,005	15.53%	NDP	56.95%	3,208	2,203	1,061	–	–	6,472
Halifax Atlantic	NDP	Lib	3,244	42.46%	665	8.70%	NDP	54.79%	3,244	2,579	1,817	–	–	7,640
Halifax Chebucto	NDP	Lib	4,352	49.87%	976	11.18%	NDP	56.15%	4,352	3,376	874	–	125	8,727
Halifax Citadel-Sable Island	NDP	Lib	2,966	47.66%	1,032	16.58%	NDP	48.64%	2,966	1,934	1,094	198	31	6,223
Halifax Needham	NDP	NDP	3,392	43.99%	277	3.59%	Lib	51.47%	3,115	3,392	834	369	–	7,710
Hammonds Plains-Lucasville	NDP	Lib	3,402	52.23%	1,818	27.91%	NDP	57.86%	3,402	1,584	1,423	–	104	6,513
Hants East	NDP	Lib	4,512	47.39%	1,100	11.55%	NDP	53.61%	4,512	3,412	1,597	–	–	9,521
Hants West	PC	PC	4,468	50.75%	1,189	13.51%	Lib	60.12%	3,279	888	4,468	169	–	8,804
Inverness	Lib	PC	3,816	49.29%	568	7.34%	Lib	72.36%	3,248	678	3,816	–	–	7,742
Kings North	NDP	PC	2,903	32.49%	21	0.24%	NDP	59.32%	2,787	2,882	2,903	362	–	8,934
Kings South	NDP	Lib	3,878	39.16%	367	3.71%	NDP	59.18%	3,878	3,511	2,263	252	–	9,904
Kings West	Lib	Lib	5,885	74.31%	4,610	58.21%	PC	55.06%	5,885	603	1,275	157	–	7,920
Lunenburg	NDP	Lib	3,182	37.81%	414	4.92%	NDP	63.24%	3,182	2,768	2,465	–	–	8,415
Lunenburg West	NDP	Lib	3,931	43.11%	1,046	11.47%	NDP	58.79%	3,931	2,885	2,143	160	–	9,119
Northside-Westmount	PC	PC	4,179	44.03%	463	4.88%	Lib	58.47%	3,716	1,597	4,179	–	–	9,492
Pictou Centre	NDP	PC	4,147	52.26%	1,774	22.36%	NDP	62.03%	1,415	2,373	4,147	–	–	7,935
Pictou East	NDP	PC	3,714	48.05%	926	11.98%	NDP	67.26%	1,228	2,788	3,714	–	–	7,730
Pictou West	NDP	PC	3,026	40.10%	438	5.80%	NDP	70.77%	1,933	2,588	3,026	–	–	7,547
Preston-Dartmouth	Lib	Lib	3,326	58.39%	1,510	26.51%	NDP	54.10%	3,326	1,816	554	–	–	5,696
Queens-Shelburne	NDP	NDP	3,066	37.10%	381	4.61%	PC	60.78%	2,302	3,066	2,685	211	–	8,264
Sackville-Beaver Bank	NDP	Lib	2,570	40.21%	201	3.15%	NDP	51.83%	2,570	2,369	1,452	–	–	6,391
Sackville-Cobequid	NDP	NDP	2,983	38.45%	85	1.10%	Lib	53.06%	2,898	2,983	1,651	227	–	7,759
Sydney-Whitney Pier	NDP	NDP	5,084	49.37%	550	5.34%	Lib	58.46%	4,534	5,084	680	–	–	10,298
Sydney River-Mira-Louisbourg	PC	PC	4,178	43.75%	380	3.98%	Lib	64.08%	3,798	1,573	4,178	–	–	9,549
Timberlea-Prospect	NDP	Lib	4,492	52.59%	2,324	27.21%	NDP	58.02%	4,492	2,168	1,588	293	–	8,541
Truro–Bible Hill–Millbrook–Salmon River	NDP	NDP	3,165	38.05%	483	5.81%	Lib	54.35%	2,682	3,165	2,470	–	–	8,317
Victoria-The Lakes	PC	Lib	3,150	39.00%	303	3.75%	PC	69.73%	3,150	1,907	2,847	–	172	8,076
Waverley-Fall River-Beaver Bank	NDP	Lib	3,588	43.09%	948	11.39%	PC	60.15%	3,588	2,098	2,640	–	–	8,326
Yarmouth	Lib	Lib	7,130	82.30%	5,897	68.07%	PC	65.41%	7,130	217	1,233	83	–	8,663

= Newly created districts
= Open seat
= Turnout is above provincial average
= Winning candidate was in previous Legislature
= Incumbent had switched allegiance
= Previously incumbent in another riding
= Not incumbent; was previously elected to the Legislature
= Incumbency arose from byelection gain
= Other incumbents renominated
= Previously an MP in the House of Commons of Canada
= Multiple candidates

== Retiring incumbents ==
The following incumbent MLAs did not run for re-election:
Liberal

- Wayne Gaudet, Clare
- Harold "Junior" Theriault, Digby-Annapolis

New Democratic

- Vicki Conrad, Queens
- Howard Epstein, Halifax Chebucto
- Bill Estabrooks, Timberlea-Prospect
- Marilyn More, Dartmouth South-Portland Valley
- Michele Raymond, Halifax Atlantic
- Graham Steele, Halifax Fairview

== Nominated candidates ==
Legend
bold denotes party leader
† denotes an incumbent who is not running for re-election or was defeated in nomination contest

=== Annapolis Valley ===
Electoral district	Candidates					Incumbent
Electoral district	NDP	Liberal	PC	Green	Independent	Incumbent
Annapolis	Henry Spurr; 834; 8.17%	**Stephen McNeil**; 7,710; 75.52%	Ginny Hurlock; 1,390; 13.62%	Ron Neufeld; 227; 2.22%		Stephen McNeil
Clare-Digby	Dean Kenley; 842; 8.90%	Gordon Wilson; 5,122; 54.13%	Paul Emile LeBlanc; 2,911; 30.77%		Ian Thurber; 492; 5.20%	Wayne Gaudet†
Clare-Digby	Dean Kenley; 842; 8.90%	Gordon Wilson; 5,122; 54.13%	Paul Emile LeBlanc; 2,911; 30.77%		Ian Thurber; 492; 5.20%	merged district
Clare-Digby	Dean Kenley; 842; 8.90%	Gordon Wilson; 5,122; 54.13%	Paul Emile LeBlanc; 2,911; 30.77%		Ian Thurber; 492; 5.20%	Harold Theriault†
Hants West	Brian Stephens; 888; 10.03%	Claude O'Hara; 3,279; 37.03%	Chuck Porter; 4,468; 50.46%	Torin Buzek; 169; 1.91%		Chuck Porter
Kings North	Jim Morton; 2,882; 32.09%	Stephen Pearl; 2,787; 31.03%	John Lohr; 2,903; 32.32%	Mary Lou Harley; 362; 4.03%		Jim Morton
Kings South	Ramona Jennex; 3,511; 35.29%	Keith Irving; 3,878; 38.98%	Shane Buchan; 2,263; 22.75%	Sheila Richardson; 252; 2.53%		Ramona Jennex
Kings West	Bob Landry; 603; 7.58%	Leo Glavine; 5,885; 74.01%	Jody Frowley; 1,275; 16.03%	Barbara Lake; 157; 1.97%		Leo Glavine

=== South Shore ===
Electoral district	Candidates					Incumbent
Electoral district	NDP	Liberal	PC	Green	Independent	Incumbent
Argyle-Barrington	Kenn Baynton; 355; 4.89%	Kent Blades; 2,905; 40.05%	Chris d'Entremont; 3,935; 54.25%			Chris d'Entremont
Chester-St. Margaret's	Denise Peterson-Rafuse; 3,341; 35.01%	Tim Harris; 2,943; 30.84%	Janet Irwin; 3,193; 33.46%			Denise Peterson-Rafuse
Lunenburg	Pam Birdsall; 2,768; 32.60%	Suzanne Lohnes-Croft; 3,182; 37.48%	Brian Pickings; 2,465; 29.03%			Pam Birdsall
Lunenburg West	Gary Ramey; 2,885; 31.48%	Mark Furey; 3,931; 42.89%	David Mitchell; 2,143; 23.38%	Robert Pierce; 160; 1.75%		Gary Ramey
Queens-Shelburne	Sterling Belliveau; 3,066; 36.86%	Benson Frail; 2,302; 27.67%	Bruce Inglis; 2,685; 32.28%	Madeline Taylor; 211; 2.54%		Sterling Belliveau
Queens-Shelburne	Sterling Belliveau; 3,066; 36.86%	Benson Frail; 2,302; 27.67%	Bruce Inglis; 2,685; 32.28%	Madeline Taylor; 211; 2.54%		merged district
Queens-Shelburne	Sterling Belliveau; 3,066; 36.86%	Benson Frail; 2,302; 27.67%	Bruce Inglis; 2,685; 32.28%	Madeline Taylor; 211; 2.54%		Vicki Conrad†
Yarmouth	Charles Webster; 217; 2.50%	Zach Churchill; 7,130; 82.03%	John Cunningham; 1,233; 14.19%	Vanessa Goodwin-Clairmont; 83; 0.95%		Zach Churchill

=== Fundy-Northeast ===
Electoral district	Candidates					Incumbent
Electoral district	NDP	Liberal	PC	Green	Independent	Incumbent
Colchester-Musquodoboit Valley	Gary Burrill; 2,293; 29.13%	Tom Martin; 2,220; 28.20%	Larry Harrison; 3,304; 41.97%			Gary Burrill
Colchester North	Jim Wyatt; 1,037; 12.57%	Karen Casey; 5,003; 60.65%	John MacDonald; 2,162; 26.21%			Karen Casey
Cumberland North	Brian Skabar; 1,974; 26.44%	Terry Farrell; 2,944; 39.43%	Judith Giroux; 2,212; 29.62%	Jason Blanch; 279; 3.74%		Brian Skabar
Cumberland South	Larry Duchesne; 486; 6.73%	Kenny Jackson; 2,884; 39.93%	**Jamie Baillie**; 3,655; 50.61%	Bruce McCulloch; 147; 2.04%		Jamie Baillie
Hants East	John MacDonell; 3,412; 35.58%	Margaret Miller; 4,512; 47.05%	Kim Williams; 1,597; 16.65%			John MacDonell
Truro–Bible Hill–Millbrook–Salmon River	Lenore Zann; 3,165; 37.75%	Barry Mellish; 2,682; 31.99%	Charles Cox; 2,470; 29.46%			Lenore Zann

=== Central Halifax ===
Electoral district	Candidates					Incumbent
Electoral district	NDP	Liberal	PC	Green	Independent	Incumbent
Clayton Park West	Blake Wright; 1,515; 17.22%	Diana Whalen; 5,929; 67.40%	Jaime D. Allen; 1,299; 14.77%			Diana Whalen
Fairview-Clayton Park	Abad Khan; 2,274; 31.19%	Patricia Arab; 3,364; 46.15%	Travis Price; 1,294; 17.75%	Raland Kinley; 177; 2.43%	Katie Campbell; 136; 1.87%	New Riding
Halifax Armdale	Drew Moore; 2,203; 33.67%	Lena Diab; 3,208; 49.04%	Irvine Carvery; 1,061; 16.22%			Graham Steele†
Halifax Chebucto	Gregor Ash; 3,376; 38.25%	Joachim Stroink; 4,352; 49.30%	Christine Dewell; 874; 9.90%		Michael Marshall; 125; 1.42%	Howard Epstein†
Halifax Citadel-Sable Island	Leonard Preyra; 1,934; 30.82%	Labi Kousoulis; 2,966; 47.27%	Andrew Black; 1,094; 17.43%	Brynn Horley; 198; 3.16%	Frederic Boileau-Cadieux; 31; 0.49%	Leonard Preyra
Halifax Needham	Maureen MacDonald; 3,392; 43.59%	Chris Poole; 3,115; 40.03%	Mary Hamblin; 834; 10.72%	Kris MacLellan; 369; 4.74%		Maureen MacDonald

=== Suburban Halifax ===
Electoral district	Candidates					Incumbent
Electoral district	NDP	Liberal	PC	Green	Independent	Incumbent
Bedford	Mike Poworoznyk; 1,701; 16.86%	Kelly Regan; 6,081; 60.29%	Joan Christie; 2,026; 20.09%	Ian Charles; 217; 2.15%		Kelly Regan
Halifax Atlantic	Tanis Crosby; 2,579; 33.37%	Brendan Maguire; 3,244; 41.98%	Ryan Brennan; 1,817; 23.51%			Michèle Raymond†
Hammonds Plains-Lucasville	Peter Lund; 1,584; 24.23%	Ben Jessome; 3,402; 52.04%	Gina Byrne; 1,423; 21.77%		Jonathan Dean; 104; 1.59%	New Riding
Sackville-Beaver Bank	Mat Whynott; 2,369; 36.75%	Stephen Gough; 2,570; 39.87%	Sarah Reeves; 1,452; 22.53%			Mat Whynott
Sackville-Cobequid	Dave Wilson; 2,983; 38.16%	Graham Cameron; 2,898; 37.07%	Peter Mac Isaac; 1,651; 21.12%	John Percy; 227; 2.90%		Dave Wilson
Timberlea-Prospect	Linda Moxsom-Skinner; 2,168; 25.23%	Iain Rankin; 4,492; 52.27%	Bruce Pretty; 1,588; 18.48%	Thomas Trappenberg; 293; 3.41%		Bill Estabrooks†
Waverley-Fall River-Beaver Bank	Percy Paris; 2,098; 25.03%	Bill Horne; 3,588; 42.81%	Brian Wong; 2,640; 31.50%			Percy Paris

=== Dartmouth/Cole Harbour/Eastern Shore ===
Electoral district	Candidates					Incumbent
Electoral district	NDP	Liberal	PC	Green	Independent	Incumbent
Cole Harbour-Eastern Passage	Becky Kent; 2,914; 38.41%	Joyce Treen; 3,057; 40.30%	Lloyd Jackson; 1,555; 20.50%			Becky Kent
Cole Harbour-Portland Valley	**Darrell Dexter**; 3,981; 40.51%	Tony Ince; 4,002; 40.72%	Greg Frampton; 1,769; 18.00%			Darrell Dexter
Dartmouth East	Deborah Stover; 1,929; 22.33%	Andrew Younger; 5,469; 63.32%	Mike MacDonell; 1,167; 13.51%			Andrew Younger
Dartmouth North	Steve Estey; 2,020; 29.86%	Joanne Bernard; 2,953; 43.66%	Sean Brownlow; 1,729; 25.56%			Vacant
Dartmouth South	Mary Vingoe; 2,918; 32.99%	Allan Rowe; 4,049; 45.78%	Gord Gamble; 1,612; 18.23%		Jim Murray; 178; 2.01%	Marilyn More†
Eastern Shore	Sid Prest; 1,922; 26.77%	Kevin Murphy; 3,770; 52.50%	Stephen Brine; 1,423; 19.82%			Sid Prest
Preston-Dartmouth	Andre Cain; 1,816; 31.44%	Keith Colwell; 3,326; 57.58%	Andrew Mecke; 554; 9.59%			Keith Colwell

=== Central Nova ===
Electoral district	Candidates					Incumbent
Electoral district	NDP	Liberal	PC	Green	Independent	Incumbent
Antigonish	Maurice Smith; 2,324; 25.39%	Randy Delorey; 3,882; 42.40%	Darren Thompson; 2,868; 31.33%			Maurice Smith
Guysborough–Eastern Shore–Tracadie	Jim Boudreau; 2,367; 32.56%	Lloyd Hines; 2,876; 39.56%	Neil DeCoff; 1,947; 26.78%			Jim Boudreau
Pictou Centre	Ross Landry; 2,373; 29.67%	Bill Muirhead; 1,415; 17.69%	Pat Dunn; 4,147; 51.84%			Ross Landry
Pictou East	Clarrie MacKinnon; 2,788; 35.82%	Francois Rochon; 1,228; 15.78%	Tim Houston; 3,714; 47.71%			Clarrie MacKinnon
Pictou West	Charlie Parker; 2,588; 34.01%	Glennie Langille; 1,933; 25.40%	Karla MacFarlane; 3,026; 39.77%			Charlie Parker

=== Cape Breton ===
Electoral district	Candidates					Incumbent
Electoral district	NDP	Liberal	PC	Green	Independent	Incumbent
Cape Breton Centre	Frank Corbett; 3,440; 45.03%	David Wilton; 3,282; 42.96%	Edna Lee; 873; 11.43%			Frank Corbett
Cape Breton-Richmond	Bert Lewis; 1,667; 21.39%	Michel Samson; 4,369; 56.06%	Joe Janega; 1,696; 21.76%			Michel Samson
Glace Bay	Mary Beth MacDonald; 1,001; 14.37%	Geoff MacLellan; 5,547; 79.61%	Tom Bethell; 355; 5.09%			Geoff MacLellan
Inverness	Michelle Smith; 678; 8.68%	Jackie Rankin; 3,248; 41.58%	Allan MacMaster; 3,816; 48.85%			Allan MacMaster
Northside-Westmount	Cecil Snow; 1,597; 16.69%	John Higgins; 3,716; 38.83%	Eddie Orrell; 4,179; 43.67%			Eddie Orrell
Sydney River-Mira-Louisbourg	Delton McDonald; 1,573; 16.35%	Josephine Kennedy; 3,798; 39.47%	Alfie MacLeod; 4,178; 43.42%			Alfie MacLeod
Sydney-Whitney Pier	Gordie Gosse; 5,084; 49.07%	Derek Mombourquette; 4,534; 43.76%	Leslie MacPhee; 680; 6.56%			Gordie Gosse
Sydney-Whitney Pier	Gordie Gosse; 5,084; 49.07%	Derek Mombourquette; 4,534; 43.76%	Leslie MacPhee; 680; 6.56%			merged district
Sydney-Whitney Pier	Gordie Gosse; 5,084; 49.07%	Derek Mombourquette; 4,534; 43.76%	Leslie MacPhee; 680; 6.56%			Vacant
Victoria-The Lakes	John Frank Toney; 1,907; 23.44%	Pam Eyking; 3,150; 38.71%	Keith Bain; 2,847; 34.99%		Stemer MacLeod; 172; 2.11%	Keith Bain

== Opinion polls ==
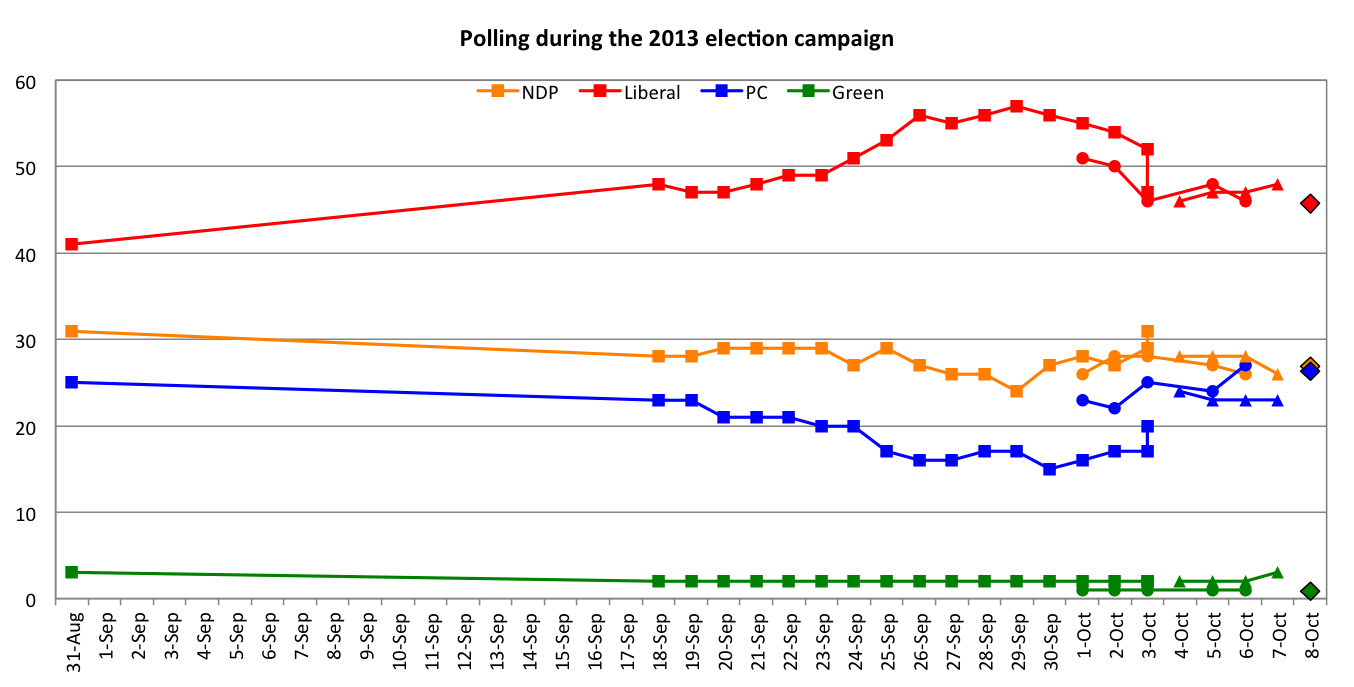
Voting intentions during the 2013 election campaign

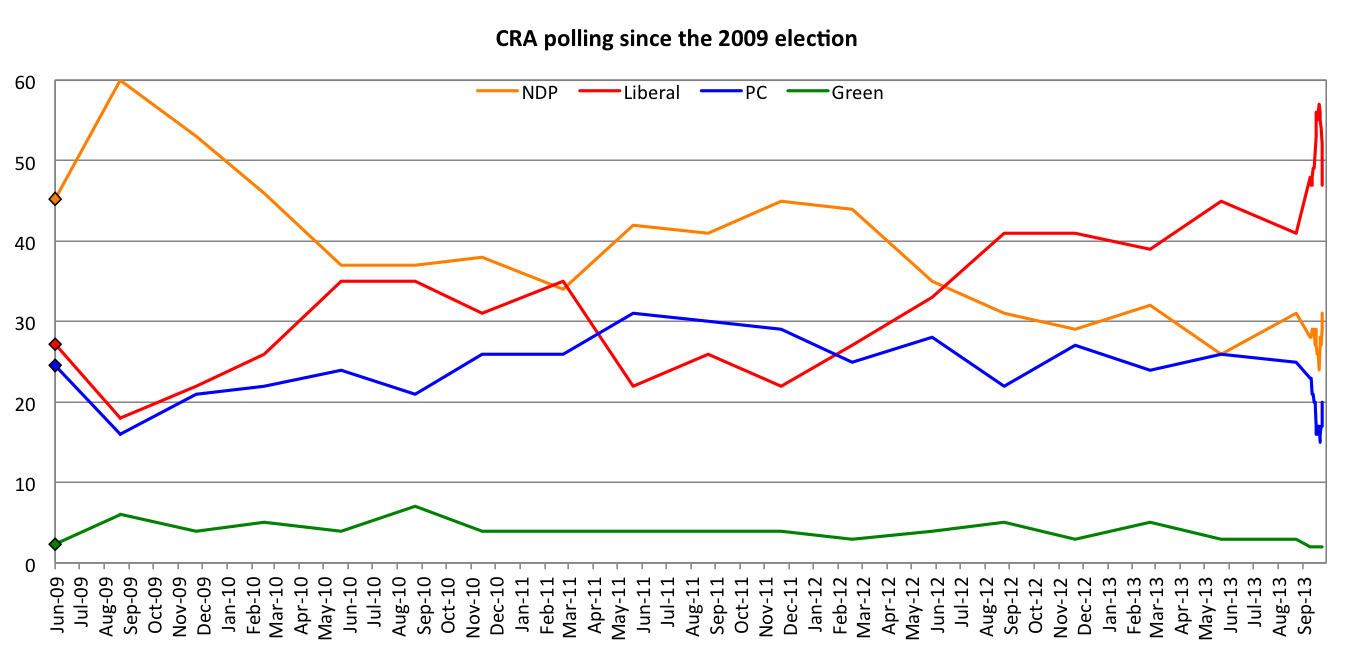
Voting intentions since the 2009 election

Polling Firm	Last Day of Polling	Link	NDP	Liberal	PC	Green
Election 2013	October 8, 2013	HTML	26.84	45.71	26.31	0.85
Forum Research	October 7, 2013	PDF	26	48	23	3
Forum Research	October 6, 2013	PDF	28	47	23	2
Abacus Data	October 6, 2013	PDF	26	46	27	1
Forum Research	October 5, 2013	PDF	28	47	23	2
Abacus Data	October 5, 2013	PDF	27	48	24	1
Forum Research	October 4, 2013	PDF	28	46	24	2
Abacus Data	October 3, 2013	PDF	28	46	25	1
Corporate Research Associates	October 3, 2013	HTML	31	47	20	2
Corporate Research Associates	October 3, 2013	HTML	29	52	17	2
Abacus Data	October 2, 2013	PDF	28	50	22	1
Corporate Research Associates	October 2, 2013	HTML	27	54	17	2
Abacus Data	October 1, 2013	PDF	26	51	23	1
Corporate Research Associates	October 1, 2013	HTML	28	55	16	2
Corporate Research Associates	September 30, 2013	HTML	27	56	15	2
Corporate Research Associates	September 29, 2013	HTML	24	57	17	2
Corporate Research Associates	September 28, 2013	HTML	26	56	17	2
Corporate Research Associates	September 27, 2013	HTML	26	55	16	2
Corporate Research Associates	September 26, 2013	HTML	27	56	16	2
Corporate Research Associates	September 25, 2013	HTML	29	53	17	2
Corporate Research Associates	September 24, 2013	HTML	27	51	20	2
Corporate Research Associates	September 23, 2013	HTML	29	49	20	2
Corporate Research Associates	September 22, 2013	HTML	29	49	21	2
Corporate Research Associates	September 21, 2013	HTML	29	48	21	2
Corporate Research Associates	September 20, 2013	HTML	29	47	21	2
Corporate Research Associates	September 19, 2013	HTML	28	47	23	2
Corporate Research Associates	September 18, 2013	HTML	28	48	23	2
Corporate Research Associates	August 31, 2013	PDF	31	41	25	3
Corporate Research Associates	May 30, 2013	PDF	26	45	26	3
Corporate Research Associates	March 3, 2013	PDF	32	39	24	5
Corporate Research Associates	November 30, 2012	PDF	29	41	27	3
Corporate Research Associates	September 2, 2012	PDF	31	41	22	5
Corporate Research Associates	June 4, 2012	PDF	35	33	28	4
Corporate Research Associates	February 26, 2012	PDF	44	27	25	3
Corporate Research Associates	November 29, 2011	PDF	45	22	29	4
Corporate Research Associates	August 31, 2011	PDF	41	26	30	4
Corporate Research Associates	May 30, 2011	PDF	42	22	31	4
Corporate Research Associates	March 3, 2011	PDF	34	35	26	4
Corporate Research Associates	November 23, 2010	PDF	38	31	26	4
Corporate Research Associates	August 31, 2010	PDF	37	35	21	7
Corporate Research Associates	May 31, 2010	PDF	37	35	24	4
Corporate Research Associates	February 24, 2010	PDF	46	26	22	5
Corporate Research Associates	December 1, 2009	HTML	53	22	21	4
Corporate Research Associates	August 29, 2009	PDF	60	18	16	6
Election 2009	June 9, 2009	PDF	45.24	27.20	24.54	2.34

== Analysis ==
On election night, the Liberal Party formed a majority government by a comfortable margin. This was the first time the Liberals had formed government in Nova Scotia since 1999, and their first majority government victory since the 1993 election. From mid 2012, the Liberals had led every public poll and entered the campaign with a 20-point lead over the New Democratic Party (NDP).

While the Liberals had been relatively successful in the Annapolis Valley and on Cape Breton Island during the 2009 election, they were completely shut out of the South Shore, Fundy, and Central Nova Scotia. More importantly, the NDP had dominated the Halifax metropolitan area, winning 14 out of 20 seats. In 2009, the NDP had been able to count on a large number of ridings in and around Halifax, while achieving historic gains across the province, including in traditionally Progressive Conservative (PC) and Liberal areas of rural Nova Scotia. In 2009, the PCs fell from first place to third place in the Legislature, and were completely shut out of the Halifax metropolitan area.

In the 2013 election, NDP support collapsed across the province, as it lost all of its seats in Central Nova Scotia, three of its seats in Fundy, and three of its seats on the South Shore. However, the most important shift was in the Halifax metropolitan area, where NDP support dropped from 54.07% in 2009 to 31.29% in 2013. The party wound up losing 13 of its seats, as the Liberals won 18 of 20 seats in and around Halifax. Strong NDP areas in 2009, like Dartmouth, Central Halifax, and suburban areas north and east of the Harbour swung from the NDP to the Liberals. Among the casualties was Dexter, who lost his own seat to Liberal challenger Tony Ince by 21 votes. He was the first premier since Ernest Armstrong to be defeated in his own riding.

The NDP had very poor vote concentration in the 2013 election. In Halifax, where it won 31.29% of the vote, it won only two seats. While the party finished second in the popular vote ahead of the PCs, its support was spread out around the province and not concentrated in enough areas to translate into seats. Combined with its collapse in Halifax, this left the NDP with only seven seats to the Tories' 11.
