= Gordie Gosse =

Canadian politician

Speaker of the House of Assembly of Nova Scotia
- In office January 19, 2011 – October 24, 2013
- Preceded by: Charlie Parker
- Succeeded by: Kevin Murphy

Member of the Nova Scotia House of Assembly for Sydney-Whitney Pier Cape Breton Nova (2003-2013)
- In office August 5, 2003 – April 2, 2015
- Preceded by: Paul MacEwan
- Succeeded by: Derek Mombourquette

Personal details
- Born: Gordon Leonard Gosse Jr. August 22, 1955 Sydney, Nova Scotia, Canada
- Died: November 14, 2019 (aged 64) Sydney, Nova Scotia, Canada
- Party: New Democratic Party
- Spouse: Susan Gosse
- Children: 2
- Occupation: Youth worker

Gordon Leonard Gosse Jr. (August 22, 1955 – November 14, 2019) was a Canadian politician. He represented the electoral districts of Cape Breton Nova and Sydney-Whitney Pier in the Nova Scotia House of Assembly from 2003 to 2015. He was a member of the Nova Scotia New Democratic Party.

== Background ==
A native of Sydney's Whitney Pier neighbourhood, Gosse was a third-generation steel worker, having worked for Sydney Steel Corporation for 18 years. An amateur athlete, Gosse also worked as a youth worker and served as Executive Director of the Whitney Pier Youth Club for 10 years.

== Political career ==
In 1999, Gosse successfully ran for the Nova Scotia New Democratic Party nomination in the riding of Cape Breton Nova, but was defeated by incumbent Paul MacEwan in the 1999 provincial election. In 2003, Gosse was again nominated as the NDP candidate in the riding. He was elected in the 2003 provincial election, achieving 44.54% of the vote and winning by a margin of 74 votes. He was re-elected in the 2006 provincial election with 60.92%, an increase of 2521 votes. He was re-elected in the 2009 provincial election with 71.07% and a margin of 3186 votes over his closest challenger. The riding of Cape Breton Nova was abolished following the 2012 electoral boundaries review. Gosse was re-elected in the new riding of Sydney-Whitney Pier in the 2013 provincial election with 49.37% and a margin of 550 votes over his closest challenger.

On January 19, 2011, Gosse was elected Speaker of the House of Assembly of Nova Scotia and held that position until October 24, 2013. While serving as Speaker, Gosse also served as Chair of the House of Assembly Management Commission as well as Chair of the Assembly Matters Committee. In appreciation for his work as Speaker of the House, Gosse was gifted a pair of boxing gloves signed by Canadian heavyweight boxing champ, George Chuvalo from his legislature colleagues in all three political parties. While serving as Speaker, Gosse implemented a strict policy banning the use of mobile devices, including smartphones in the Nova Scotia House of Assembly during Question Period, stating that he would order the Sergeant-at-Arms to confiscate any device should the rule be violated.

On April 2, 2015, Gosse announced his resignation as MLA for health reasons, due to an oropharyngeal cancer diagnosis. He died of cancer on November 14, 2019, in his hometown of Sydney, Nova Scotia at the age of 64.

== Election results ==
2013 Nova Scotia general election: Sydney-Whitney Pier
Party	Candidate	Votes	%	±%
New Democratic	Gordie Gosse	5,084	49.37	−5.25
Liberal	Derek Mombourquette	4,534	44.03	+8.80
Progressive Conservative	Leslie MacPhee	680	6.60	−1.79
Total valid votes		10,298	99.40	
Total rejected ballots		62	0.60	
Turnout		10,360	57.86	
Electors on the lists		17,906	–	
New Democratic hold		Swing		−7.03
Source: Elections Nova Scotia

== See also ==
- Politics of Nova Scotia
