= Sydney Academy =

Location
- 49 Terrace Street; Sydney, Nova Scotia, B1P 2L4; Canada; 46°8′18.1″N 60°10′50.4″W

Information
- School type: Secondary
- Motto: Pro Salute Academiae et Disciplorum (For the good of the Academy and its Students)
- Founded: 1841
- School board: Cape Breton – Victoria Regional School Board
- Principal: Michael McPhee
- Grades: 9-12
- Enrollment: 980
- Language: English
- Colours: Blue and White
- Mascot: Wildcat
- Team name: Wildcats
- Website: sites.google.com/gnspes.ca/sydneyacademy/home

Sydney Academy (often abbreviated as SA and once often referred to as "The Academy") is one of two main secondary schools, along with Riverview Rural High School, that service the city of Sydney, Nova Scotia. Its current building, at 49 Terrace Street, is an educational facility opened in 1959, and is the sixth building to house the school. It is the oldest school in the Sydney area, and once was a private school near the end of the 19th century. The Academy is the Cape Breton Regional Municipality's (CBRM) only school to offer the International Baccalaureate (IB) program, which began in the summer of 1987.

Sydney Academy High School covers grades 9 to 12. It offers an unofficial preparatory program for the IB in grades 9 and 10, with full IB courses available to students in grades 11 and 12. The school offers co-ed classes in all grades. It is estimated that in its first 150 years, Sydney Academy graduated over 25,000 students. In recent years, the school has experienced a lag in numbers, as graduates emigrate and families from Cape Breton move to other parts of Canada in search of employment.

The 2015–2016 school year introduced grades 9-12, as per changes to the middle school model implemented by the Cape Breton-Victoria Regional School board.

== History ==
=== Buildings ===
==== The first building ====
In 1835, an act was passed by the General Assembly of Nova Scotia authorizing the Lieutenant Governor to appoint trustees and to make a grant of land for school purposes in Sydney. In a grant dated 25 October 1836, land located north by DesBarres Street, south by Amelia Street, east by George Street, and west by Charlotte Street was designated for the new Sydney Academy.

The two-storey school was opened on 1 July 1841, with Rev. O.S. Weeks as the first Headmaster. Campbell Street was opened up at that time through the property and the portion not required for school purposes was divided into lots. Some of the lots were sold to provide funds to pay for the new building, which cost $2800.

The original building, a tiny schoolhouse, eventually ceased to be used as a school and was turned into a dwelling. Later, a part of this building was moved to 78 George Street, where it still stands with alterations.

==== The second building ====
Demand for a new building was met in 1864, when the new Education Act provided for the construction of a new school. The Sydney Board selected a site on Pitt Street, where the present telephone office now stands. This building was officially opened on 1 May 1866 and cost $3600. It was used until 1882, at which time larger accommodations for educational work were needed. The second Sydney Academy building was destroyed by fire in 1901.

==== The third building ====
A former building of Sydney Academy, next to Central School.

In 1882, a new eight-room building was erected on the corner of George and Dorchester Streets at a cost of $6000. It was architecturally one of the finest wooden buildings for its purpose in the province. The grounds, containing about three acres, were divided into separate areas for boys and girls.

==== The fourth building ====
Due to the influx of people arriving in Sydney to work at the Steel Plant, a new Academy was built in 1901 to accommodate an increasing number of students. This three-story brick and stone building was located next to the previous Academy and contained modern facilities such as a chemical and physical laboratory as well as an assembly hall capable of seating up to 500 people. The $30,000 building later became Central School. It currently houses senior administration of the Cape Breton Victoria Regional School Board.

==== The fifth building ====
Overcrowding soon resulted in the need for yet another larger building. So, a fifth building was built in 1911 for $53,000 at the corner of Terrace and Park streets. This building later became known as "the Old Academy" and eventually became Park Junior High.

==== The sixth building ====
The present-day steel and glass Sydney Academy was built at 49 Terrace Street and was officially opened on 8 September 1959. The school was experiencing an exponential growth that came from the coal mining boom in Cape Breton. At the time of opening, the gymnasium of the new school was said to be the best in the Maritimes with a seating capacity of 2400. The cost of this building was $1,250,000. A major addition was made to the building in 1968, with sixteen classrooms being added to accommodate the business students. This section is still referred to as the "new wing" today.

=== Timeline ===
==== 1800s ====
In 1884, the Sydney Academy Debating Society was formed. It continues to gain much recognition for the success of its debaters today.

In 1888, the Academy yearbook was established and was given the name "The Record".

In 1891, the first Burchell Gold Medal was awarded to the top senior student. This medal is still awarded today and is one of the oldest continuing prizes for high school students in Canada.

In 1892, the Academy's first Model Parliament was formed, under the direction of E.T. Mosley.

==== 1910s–1920s ====
In 1900, music and painting were added to the school's curriculum.

In 1912, the Sydney Academy hockey club defeated Glace Bay High School, 5–0, on a game played on the frozen Glace Bay harbour. The hockey club went on to win the Cape Breton High School Championship in 1923.

In 1922, the Governor-General's Medal was awarded to the top student in the graduating class for the first time at Sydney Academy.

==== 1930s ====
In 1935, Dr. George Graham Campbell became the principal. Serving from 1935 to 1968, he was the longest-serving principal of Sydney Academy. Under his leadership, Sydney Academy became one of the most outstanding high schools in the Atlantic region.

In 1932, Sydney Academy began to educate senior high students only.

In 1934, three boys from the track team were chosen to compete in the British Empire Trials in Hamilton, Ontario as part of the Maritime Track Team. They traveled there on one of the Dosco coal boats that was headed for Montreal.

In 1935, the Glee Club was formed.

In 1937, a representative of Sydney Academy was selected to attend the coronation of King George VI in London, England.

==== 1940s ====
On 23 December 1942, the Academy Rink opened its doors to students and the public for the first time.

In 1947, a Guidance Counsellor was appointed for Sydney Schools for the first time. He was Don MacAdam.

==== 1950s ====
In 1950, the boys' basketball team won their 6th consecutive Maritime Juvenile Championship, under Pat Paterson and Joseph Chiasson.

In 1959, the first Head Boy and Head Girl from the senior class were elected by the student body. This tradition continues today.

==== 1960s ====
In 1963, the Academy Soccer team played a game with the crew members of the German freighter Klaus Leonhardt. The German team presented an autographed picture of the ship to the school.

In 1968, the girls' basketball team won the provincial title for the first time.

==== 1970s ====
In 1971, the Academy Debating team tied for first place at the Canadian High School Championship held at McGill University.

In 1972, Sydney Academy had its largest-ever graduating class with 394 graduates.

In 1974, a record enrollment occurred as a total of 1,517 students registered for classes at the Academy.

Also, in 1974, the first G. G. Campbell Memorial Medal was awarded to a male and female student of the senior graduating class.

In 1976, the first Shauna MacFadyen Memorial Award was awarded to a senior student of the graduating class.

In 1979, the boys' hockey club won the Cape Breton Metros National Invitational Hockey Tournament for the seventh time in eight years.

==== 1980s–1990s ====
In September 1985, Sydney Academy's first modern Canadian football team was established, playing its first game against its rival, Riverview High School, at the Membertou field. Only one year after being formed, the football team won first place in the Gallivan Bowl.

In 1987, male cheerleading began.

In January 1987, Sydney Academy became only the second public school in this province to be accredited as an IB school by the International Baccalaureate Organization of Geneva, Switzerland.

In 1989, Sydney Academy graduated its first French Immersion class.

In 1991, Sydney Academy celebrated 150 years by holding an all-years reunion.

During the 1998–1999 school year, the Academy debating team won first place in three different tournaments: the Canadian High School Championship held at McGill University, the Queens University High School Nationals, and the Nova Scotia Provincial Championships. The team also took home the prize for top speaker in the latter two tournaments.

==== 2000s ====
In 2011, the debating team placed first in the Provincial Debating Championships.

=== Principals ===
1841-1845 Rev. O.S. Weeks	1845-1847 J. Dunlin Parkinson	1847-1849 Samuel Richardson	2020–2024 Mrs. Kathi McConnell-Hore
1849-1850 G.B. Watson	1850-1865 Isaac McKay	1865-1865 Wm. Street Harvey	
1865-1869 H.C. Creed	1869-1870 John Sievewright	1870-1870 John Harper	
1870-1872 W.T. Pipes	1872-1873 J.A. Gillies	1873-1874 Aenease Cameron	
1874-1875 Lewis MacInnes	1875-1877 Rev. James Christie	1877-1882 Burgess McKittrick	
1882-1883 Hector McInnes	1883-1889 Burgess McKittrick	1889-1898 E.T. MacKeen	
1898-1904 F.I. Stewart	1904-1907 J.A. Armstrong	1907-1909 C.L. Moore	
1909-1910 G.W. MacKenzie	1910-1922 Dr. W.A. Creelman	1922-1935 Russel Ellis	
1935-1968 Dr. George G. Campbell	1968-1984 Dr. Robert Chafe	1984-1989 Edgar MacTavish	
1989-1998 Peter Mombourquette	1998-2006 Brian Dwyer	2006-2020 Mr. Kevin Deveaux	2024–Present Michael McPhee

== Tributes ==
=== Anthem ===
The official Sydney Academy anthem was written by Robert Angel and Leon Dubinsky, members of the 1960 graduating class. It is titled "All Hail Sydney Academy".

(Verse)
All hail, Sydney Academy
The pride and joy of C.B.
All hail, Sydney Academy
For education and fraternity.
All hail, Sydney Academy
The cherished and beloved,
Its history always seems to be
An inspiration to us all,
And its destiny will go on to see
Our answer to its call.
(Chorus)
Beloved Alma Mater
Whose past we hold so dear;
We'll cherish it in years to come
Its memory sharp and clear.
(repeat 1st verse)

=== Ode ===
In 1937, famed Canadian author Hugh MacLennan wrote "Ode to the Academy" which is about the school.

On Park Street did Minvera's Knights
A temple to her fame decree
Where half a thousand souls so wild
Made Satan's angel's works seem mild...,
They reared Academy.
So thirteen rooms, ne'er looking sound
With walls of brick were girded round.
There was the Lab, which sends forth odors queer
And here, the scene of dances gay and free
A place that every student's heart holds dear
This blessed school, our own Academy.

== Alumni ==
=== Notable alumni ===
- Sir John George Bourinot was Clerk of The House of Commons from 1880 to 1902 and author of "Bourinot's Rules of Order" which is still used in Canada and other Commonwealth Countries as the Standard Parliamentary Manuel. Graduated from SA in 1854.
- John Buchanan served as premier of Nova Scotia from 1978 to 1990. Graduated from SA in 1948.
- Nathan Cohen renowned Toronto Star theatre critic, and Canadian Broadcasting Corporation Radio/TV host. Graduated from SA in 1938.
- Kevin Lynch was Clerk of the Privy Council of Canada from 2006 to 2009 and is now vice chairman of the BMO Financial Group. Graduated from SA in 1969.
- Frankie MacDonald is a popular YouTuber with a large social media presence, having amassed nearly 500 thousand followers on Instagram and YouTube combined. Graduated from SA in 2004.
- Dr. Arthur McDonald, 2015 Nobel prize winner in physics and professor emeritus at Queen's University in Kingston. Founder of and former director of Sudbury Neutrino Observatory in Sudbury, Ontario. Graduated from SA in 1960.
- Guy Robertson McLean served as president of Mount Allison University from 1980 to 1986. Graduated from SA in 1948.
