= 49th General Assembly of Nova Scotia =

- Majority parliament
- 1 December 1967 – 5 September 1970

Parliament leaders
- Premier: Robert Stanfield; November 20, 1956 – September 13, 1967
- George Isaac Smith; September 13, 1967 – October 28, 1970
- Leader of the Opposition: Gerald Regan; May 30, 1967 – October 28, 1970

Party caucuses
- Government: Progressive Conservative Party
- Opposition: Liberal Party

House of Assembly
- Speaker of the House: Harvey Veniot; February 8, 1961 – April 11, 1968
- Gordon H. Fitzgerald; February 13, 1969 – September 5, 1970
- Members: 46 MLA seats

Sovereign
- Monarch: Elizabeth II; February 6, 1952
- Lieutenant Governor: Henry Poole MacKeen; March 1, 1963 – July 22, 1968
- Victor de Bedia Oland; July 22, 1968

Sessions
- 1st session December 1, 1967 – December 7, 1967
- 2nd session February 22, 1968 – April 11, 1968
- 3rd session February 13, 1969 – April 25, 1969
- 4th session February 19, 1970 – September 5, 1970
← 48th	→ 50th

The 49th General Assembly of Nova Scotia represented Nova Scotia between December 1, 1967 and September 5, 1970.

== Division of seats ==
There were 46 members of the General Assembly, elected in the 1967 Nova Scotia general election.

Leader	Party	# of Seats
Gerald Regan	Liberal	6
Robert L. Stanfield	Progressive Conservative	40
Total		46

== List of members ==
Riding	Name	Party	First elected / previously elected	Position
Annapolis East	John I. Marshall	Progressive Conservative	1963	
Annapolis West	Peter Murray Nicholson	Liberal	1956	
Antigonish	William F. MacKinnon	Progressive Conservative	1956	
Cape Breton South	Donald C. McNeil	Progressive Conservative	1956	
Cape Breton Centre	Mike Laffin	Progressive Conservative	1963	
Cape Breton North	Tom McKeough	Progressive Conservative	1960	
Cape Breton Nova	Percy Gaum	Progressive Conservative	1956	
Cape Breton East	Layton Fergusson	Progressive Conservative	1956	
Cape Breton West	Edward Manson	Progressive Conservative	1956	
Clare	Benoit Comeau	Liberal	1967	
Colchester	Robert L. Stanfield	Progressive Conservative	1949	Premier
Colchester	G. I. Smith	Progressive Conservative	1949	Premier (1967)
Colchester	Gerald Ritcey (1968)	Progressive Conservative	1968	
Cumberland East	James A. Langille	Progressive Conservative	1953	
Cumberland West	D. L. George Henley	Progressive Conservative	1963	
Cumberland Centre	Stephen T. Pyke	Progressive Conservative	1953	Minister of Highways
Cumberland Centre	Raymond M. Smith (1968)	Progressive Conservative	1968	
Dartmouth North	Gordon L. S. Hart	Liberal	1960, 1967	
Dartmouth North	Gerald G. Wambolt (1968)	Progressive Conservative	1968	
Dartmouth South	I. W. Akerley	Progressive Conservative	1963	
Digby	Robert Baden Powell	Progressive Conservative	1963	
Guysborough	Alex "Tando" MacIsaac	Progressive Conservative	1960	
Guysborough	Angus MacIsaac (1969)	Progressive Conservative	1969	
Halifax Atlantic	John Buchanan	Progressive Conservative	1967	
Halifax Cornwallis	Richard A. Donahoe	Progressive Conservative	1954	
Halifax Citadel	Donald M. Smith	Progressive Conservative	1960	
Halifax Chebucto	James H. Vaughan	Progressive Conservative	1963	
Halifax Cobequid	Gordon H. Fitzgerald	Progressive Conservative	1960	speaker (1969)
Halifax Eastern Shore	Duncan MacMillan	Liberal	1956, 1967	
Halifax Eastern Shore	Alexander Garnet Brown (1969)	Liberal	1969	
Halifax Needham	Gerald Regan	Liberal	1967	
Halifax St. Margarets	D. C. McNeil	Progressive Conservative	1963	
Hants East	Albert J. Ettinger	Progressive Conservative	1962	
Hants West	Norman T. Spence	Progressive Conservative	1963	
Inverness	Norman J. MacLean	Progressive Conservative	1963	
Inverness	William N. MacLean	Liberal	1962	
Kings North	Victor Thorpe	Progressive Conservative	1967	
Kings South	Edward Haliburton	Progressive Conservative	1953	
Kings West	Gordon Tidman	Progressive Conservative	1967	
Lunenburg Centre	George O. Lohnes	Progressive Conservative	1956	
Lunenburg East	Maurice L. Zinck	Progressive Conservative	1959	
Lunenburg West	Harley J. Spence	Progressive Conservative	1953	
Pictou East	Thomas MacQueen	Progressive Conservative	1967	
Pictou West	Harvey Veniot	Progressive Conservative	1956	speaker
Pictou Centre	Donald R. MacLeod	Progressive Conservative	1956	
Queens	W. S. Kennedy Jones	Progressive Conservative	1953	
Richmond	Gerald Doucet	Progressive Conservative	1963	
Shelburne	James M. Harding	Progressive Conservative	1956	
Victoria	Fisher Hudson	Progressive Conservative	1967	
Yarmouth	George A. Snow	Progressive Conservative	1963	
Yarmouth	Benoit Robichaud	Progressive Conservative	1967	

== Former members of the 49th General Assembly ==
Name	Party	Electoral District	Cause of departure	Succeeded by	Elected
Robert L. Stanfield	Progressive Conservative	Colchester	became federal party leader	Gerald Ritcey, PC	February 13, 1968
Stephen T. Pyke	Progressive Conservative	Cumberland Centre		Raymond M. Smith, PC	November 26, 1968
Gordon L. S. Hart	Liberal	Dartmouth North		Gerald G. Wambolt, PC	November 26, 1968
Alex MacIsaac	Progressive Conservative	Guysborough	death	Angus MacIsaac, PC	February 11, 1969
Duncan MacMillan	Liberal	Halifax Eastern Shore	death	Alexander Garnet Brown, Liberal	February 11, 1969

Preceded by 48th General Assembly of Nova Scotia	General Assemblies of Nova Scotia; 1967–1970	Succeeded by 50th General Assembly of Nova Scotia
