= 1970 Nova Scotia general election =

Canadian provincial election

- October 13, 1970

46 seats of the Nova Scotia House of Assembly 24 seats needed for a majority
- Turnout: 77.32% ▲0.32pp
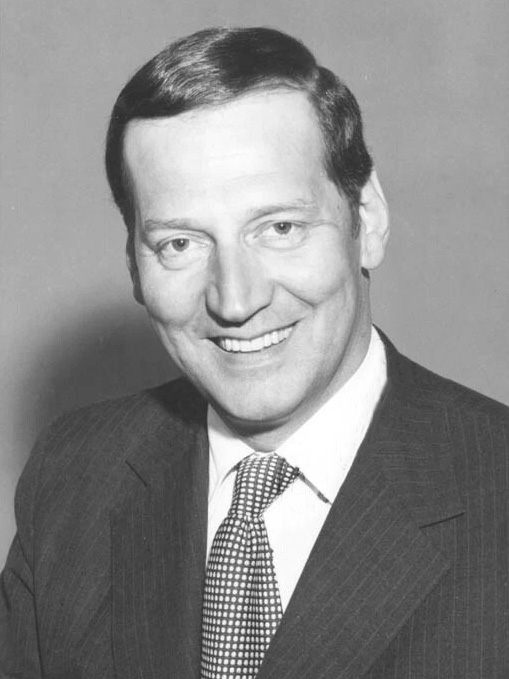

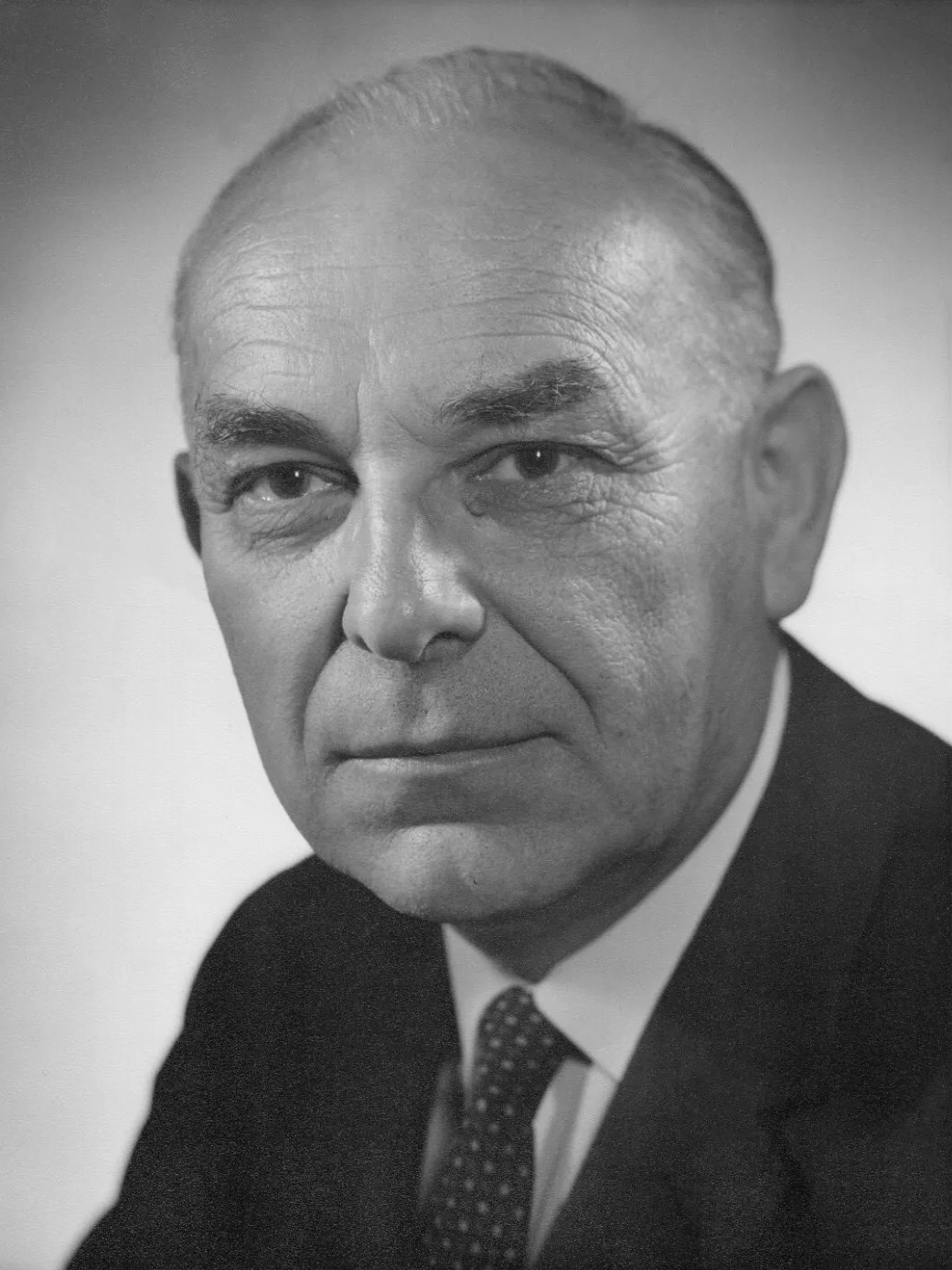

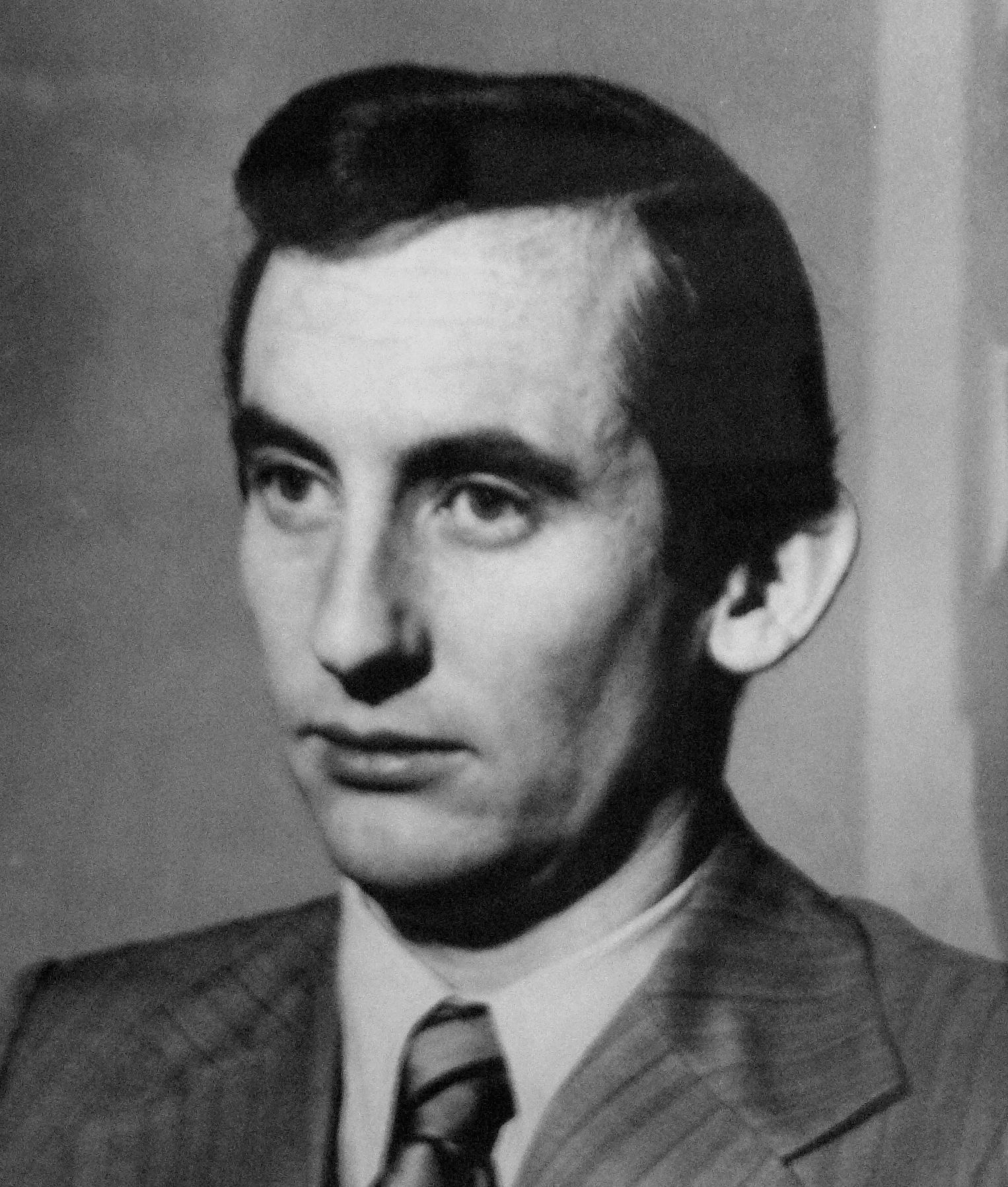
	First party	Second party	Third party
Leader	Gerald Regan	George Isaac Smith	Jeremy Akerman
Party	Liberal	Progressive Conservative	New Democratic
Leader since	July 24, 1965	November 4, 1967	November 9, 1968
Leader's seat	Halifax Needham	Colchester	Ran in Cape Breton East (won)
Last election	6	40	0
Seats won	23	21	2
Seat change	▲17	▼19	▲2
Popular vote	174,943	177,986	25,259
Percentage	45.63%	46.43%	6.59%
Swing	▲4.14pp	▼5.96pp	▲1.40pp
Premier before election
George Isaac Smith
Progressive Conservative
Premier after election
Gerald Regan
Liberal

The 1970 Nova Scotia general election was held on 13 October 1970 to elect members of the 50th House of Assembly of the Province of Nova Scotia, Canada. The Liberal Party of Gerald Regan won the most seats but were one seat short of a majority. It is the only election in Nova Scotia's history in which the party who won the popular vote did not win the most seats.

== Results ==
=== Results by party ===
↓
23	21	2
Liberal	Progressive Conservative	New Democratic

Official results
Party	Party leader	# of candidates	Seats				Popular vote		
Party	Party leader	# of candidates	1967	Dissolution	Elected	Change	#	%	Change (pp)
Liberal	Gerald Regan	46	6	5	23	+17	174,943	45.63%	+4.14%
Progressive Conservative	George Isaac Smith	46	40	41	21	-19	177,986	46.43%	-5.96%
New Democratic	Jeremy Akerman	23	0	0	2	+2	25,259	6.59%	+1.40%
Independent		2	0	0	0	0	1,464	0.38%	+0.24%
Vacant				0					
Total valid votes							379,652	99.03%	-0.19%
Blank and invalid ballots							3,704	0.97%	+0.19%
Total		117	46	46	46	–	383,356	100.00%	–
Registered voters / turnout							453,727	77.32%	+0.32%

Popular vote
PC	46.43%
Liberal	45.63%
New Democratic	6.59%
Independent	0.38%

Seats summary
Liberal	50.00%
PC	45.65%
New Democratic	4.35%

=== Results by region ===
Party name		HRM	Cape Breton	Annapolis Valley	South Shore	Fundy-Northeast	Central Nova	Total
Parties winning seats in the legislature
Liberal	Seats:	9	2	4	4	1	3	23
Liberal	Popular vote:	51.93%	34.59%	50.85%	50.49%	45.08%	46.16%	45.63%
Progressive Conservative	Seats:	1	6	4	3	5	2	21
Progressive Conservative	Popular vote:	42.77%	46.14%	48.80%	48.46%	52.91%	46.50%	46.43%
New Democratic Party	Seats:	0	2	0	0	0	0	2
New Democratic Party	Popular vote:	5.30%	17.76%	–	1.06%	2.01%	7.34%	6.59%
Parties not winning seats in the legislature
Independent	Popular vote:	–	1.50%	0.35%	–	–	–	0.38%
Total seats:		10	10	8	7	6	5	46

== Retiring incumbents ==
Progressive Conservative

- Edward Haliburton, Kings South
- James McKay Harding, Shelburne
- James A. Langille, Cumberland East
- William F. MacKinnon, Antigonish
- Donald C. MacNeil, Cape Breton South
- Edward Manson, Cape Breton West
- John I. Marshall, Annapolis East
- Robert Baden Powell, Digby
- Harley J. Spence, Lunenburg West

== Nominated candidates ==
Legend
bold denotes party leader
† denotes an incumbent who is not running for re-election or was defeated in nomination contest

=== Valley ===
Electoral district	Candidates				Incumbent
Electoral district	PC	Liberal	NDP	Independent	Incumbent
Annapolis East	Gerry Sheehy; 2,836; 54.36%	Lloyd K. Hill; 2,381; 45.64%			John I. Marshall†
Annapolis West	H. Robert Sanford; 2,048; 46.03%	Peter M. Nicholson; 2,401; 53.97%			Peter M. Nicholson
Clare	Paul J. Comeau; 1,833; 40.33%	Benoit Comeau; 2,712; 59.67%			Benoit Comeau
Digby	Gifford W. Lewis; 2,142; 42.46%	Joseph H. Casey; 2,903; 57.54%			Robert Baden Powell†
Hants West	Norman T. Spence; 3,708; 48.27%	Robert D. Lindsay; 3,974; 51.73%			Norman T. Spence
Kings North	Victor Thorpe; 3,234; 51.24%	Glenn Ells; 3,077; 48.76%			Victor Thorpe
Kings South	Harry How; 2,722; 57.55%	Ed Aston; 2,008; 42.45%			Edward Haliburton†
Kings West	Gordon Tidman; 3,736; 48.96%	Frank Bezanson; 3,735; 48.95%		Francis Keith Boates; 160; 2.10%	Gordon Tidman

=== South Shore ===
Electoral district	Candidates				Incumbent
Electoral district	PC	Liberal	NDP	Independent	Incumbent
Lunenburg Centre	George O. Lohnes; 4,040; 45.43%	Walton Cook; 4,852; 54.57%			George O. Lohnes
Lunenburg East	Maurice L. Zinck; 2,092; 51.31%	Eric Hagen; 1,985; 48.69%			Maurice L. Zinck
Lunenburg West	Bob Levy; 2,717; 46.82%	Maurice DeLory; 3,086; 53.18%			Harley J. Spence†
Queens	W. S. Kennedy Jones; 3,068; 51.99%	Harley Umphrey; 2,833; 48.01%			W. S. Kennedy Jones
Shelburne	Bill Cox; 3,321; 43.74%	Harold Huskilson; 3,725; 49.06%	Aubrey Harding; 547; 7.20%		James McKay Harding†
Yarmouth	Benoit Robichaud; 4,896; 25.16%	Fraser Mooney; 5,039; 25.90%			Benoit Robichaud
Yarmouth	George A. Snow; 4,929; 25.33%	Jack Rogers; 4,592; 23.60%			George A. Snow

=== Fundy-Northeast ===
Electoral district	Candidates				Incumbent
Electoral district	PC	Liberal	NDP	Independent	Incumbent
Colchester	Gerald Ritcey; 8,012; 24.56%	Ross Hill; 7,313; 22.42%			Gerald Ritcey
Colchester	**George Isaac Smith**; 9,398; 28.81%	George Norrie; 7,901; 24.22%			George Isaac Smith
Cumberland Centre	Raymond M. Smith; 2,220; 54.87%	Bill H. Mont; 1,611; 39.82%	John E. Burbine; 215; 5.31%		Raymond M. Smith
Cumberland East	Roger Stuart Bacon; 4,355; 51.89%	Leonard J. Dolan; 3,142; 37.44%	James M. MacSwain; 895; 10.66%		James A. Langille†
Cumberland West	D. L. George Henley; 2,458; 57.35%	Thomas H. Tonner; 1,828; 42.65%			D. L. George Henley
Hants East	Albert J. Ettinger; 2,793; 47.27%	Jack Hawkins; 3,115; 52.73%			Albert J. Ettinger

=== Halifax/Dartmouth/Eastern Shore ===
Electoral district	Candidates				Incumbent
Electoral district	PC	Liberal	NDP	Independent	Incumbent
Halifax Atlantic	John Buchanan; 5,284; 54.66%	Bob Hayes; 3,786; 39.16%	Charles Grineault; 597; 6.18%		John Buchanan
Halifax Chebucto	James H. Vaughan; 4,015; 38.34%	James L. Connolly; 5,276; 50.39%	Burris Devanney; 1,180; 11.27%		James H. Vaughan
Halifax Citadel	Donald MacKeen Smith; 3,833; 45.60%	Ronald Wallace; 4,572; 54.40%			Donald MacKeen Smith
Halifax Cobequid	Gordon H. Fitzgerald; 5,427; 42.69%	George Riley; 6,453; 50.76%	Bruno Dombrowski; 833; 6.55%		Gordon H. Fitzgerald
Halifax Cornwallis	Richard Donahoe; 3,891; 39.27%	George M. Mitchell; 5,323; 53.72%	Barrett D. Halderman; 694; 7.00%		Richard Donahoe
Halifax Eastern Shore	Murray Everett Ritcey; 4,029; 41.91%	Alexander Garnet Brown; 5,585; 58.09%			Alexander Garnet Brown
Halifax Needham	David MacKeen; 2,887; 37.05%	**Gerald Regan**; 4,514; 57.92%	Al Sinclair; 392; 5.03%		Gerald Regan
Halifax-St. Margaret's	D. C. McNeil; 4,729; 39.74%	Leonard L. Pace; 6,152; 51.69%	Keith Jobson; 1,020; 8.57%		D. C. McNeil
Dartmouth North	Gerald G. Wambolt; 4,826; 39.59%	Glen M. Bagnell; 6,614; 54.26%	Percy William Dares; 750; 6.15%		Gerald G. Wambolt
Dartmouth South	Irvin William Akerley; 5,213; 49.57%	D. Scott MacNutt; 5,304; 50.43%			Irvin William Akerley

=== Central Nova ===
Electoral district	Candidates				Incumbent
Electoral district	PC	Liberal	NDP	Independent	Incumbent
Antigonish	Bill Shaw; 3,594; 45.72%	Bill Gillis; 4,002; 50.91%	Alex MacPherson; 265; 3.37%		William F. MacKinnon†
Guysborough	Angus MacIsaac; 3,035; 47.86%	Russell Pellerin; 2,770; 43.68%	Al Newell; 537; 8.47%		Angus MacIsaac
Pictou Centre	Donald R. MacLeod; 4,922; 43.75%	Ralph F. Fiske; 5,356; 47.61%	Derrick Peter Kearley; 972; 8.64%		Donald R. MacLeod
Pictou East	Thomas MacQueen; 2,981; 47.18%	A. Lloyd MacDonald; 3,000; 47.48%	Charles E. Arbuckle; 338; 5.35%		Thomas MacQueen
Pictou West	Harvey Veniot; 2,729; 51.00%	Laurence Mawhinney; 2,008; 37.53%	Robert Cormier; 614; 11.47%		Harvey Veniot

=== Cape Breton ===
Electoral district	Candidates				Incumbent
Electoral district	PC	Liberal	NDP	Independent	Incumbent
Cape Breton Centre	Mike Laffin; 3,680; 50.54%	Stewart Marsh; 1,902; 26.12%	Alex MacDonald; 1,700; 23.35%		Mike Laffin
Cape Breton East	Layton Fergusson; 3,807; 34.06%	Bob MacKay; 2,037; 18.22%	**Jeremy Akerman**; 5,334; 47.72%		Layton Fergusson
Cape Breton North	Tom MacKeough; 5,755; 50.04%	Sidney Oram; 2,885; 25.09%	Len J. Arsenault; 2,860; 24.87%		Tom MacKeough
Cape Breton Nova	Percy Gaum; 2,866; 42.45%	Ronald DiPenta; 959; 14.20%	Paul MacEwan; 2,927; 43.35%		Percy Gaum
Cape Breton South	John Francis Burke; 5,234; 44.36%	Vince MacLean; 5,034; 42.66%	Don MacPherson; 1,531; 12.98%		Donald C. MacNeil†
Cape Breton West	Kenneth Andrews; 4,843; 49.08%	Allan Sullivan; 5,024; 50.92%			Edward Manson†
Inverness	Norman J. MacLean; 4,607; 25.23%	William N. MacLean; 3,939; 21.57%	Jerry Yetman; 556; 3.05%	Al Davis; 1,304; 7.14%	Norman J. MacLean
Inverness	Joe Shannon; 3,728; 20.42%	John Archie MacKenzie; 4,124; 22.59%			William N. MacLean
Richmond	Gerald Doucet; 3,439; 55.67%	Melvin J. Burt; 2,411; 39.03%	Charles Joseph Gallant; 327; 5.29%		Gerald Doucet
Victoria	Fisher Hudson; 2,075; 52.53%	W. Harry F. Langley; 1,700; 43.04%	Jessie Stone; 175; 4.43%		Fisher Hudson
