= 49th Nova Scotia general election =

The 49th Nova Scotia general election may refer to

- the 1967 Nova Scotia general election, the 48th overall general election for Nova Scotia, for the (due to a counting error in 1859) 49th General Assembly of Nova Scotia, or
- the 1970 Nova Scotia general election, the 49th overall general election for Nova Scotia, for the 50th General Assembly of Nova Scotia, but considered the 27th general election for the Canadian province of Nova Scotia.
