= 61st General Assembly of Nova Scotia =

- Majority parliament
- June 25, 2009 – September 7, 2013

Parliament leaders
- Premier: Darrell Dexter; June 19, 2009 – October 22, 2013
- Leader of the Opposition: Stephen McNeil; June 19, 2009 – October 22, 2013

Party caucuses
- Government: New Democratic Party
- Opposition: Liberal Party
- Recognized: Progressive Conservative Party

House of Assembly
- Speaker of the House: Charlie Parker; June 25, 2009 – January 11, 2011
- Gordie Gosse; January 19, 2011 – September 7, 2013
- Government House Leader: Frank Corbett; June 25, 2009 – September 7, 2013
- Opposition House Leader: Manning MacDonald; June 25, 2009 – January 27, 2012
- Michel Samson; January 27, 2012 – September 7, 2013
- Members: 52 MLA seats

Sovereign
- Monarch: Elizabeth II; February 6, 1952
- Lieutenant Governor: Mayann Francis; September 7, 2006 – April 12, 2012
- John James Grant; April 12, 2012

Sessions
- 1st session June 25, 2009 – March 25, 2010
- 2nd session March 25, 2010 – March 31, 2011
- 3rd session March 31, 2011 – March 29, 2012
- 4th session March 29, 2012 – March 26, 2013
- 5th session March 26, 2013 – September 7, 2013
← 60th	→ 62nd

61st General Assembly of Nova Scotia was an assembly of the Nova Scotia House of Assembly that was determined in the 2009 Nova Scotia election. The first session of the General Assembly lasted from 25 June 2009 to 25 March 2010. The second session began on 25 March 2010 with a speech from the throne.

== List of members ==
Riding	Member	Party	First elected / previously elected
Annapolis	Stephen McNeil	Liberal	2003
Antigonish	Angus MacIsaac	Progressive Conservative	1969, (Note: Guysborough) 1999
Antigonish	Maurice Smith	NDP	2009
Argyle	Chris d'Entremont	Progressive Conservative	2003
Bedford—Birch Cove	Kelly Regan	Liberal	2009
Cape Breton Centre	Frank Corbett	NDP	1998
Cape Breton North	Cecil Clarke	Progressive Conservative	2001
Cape Breton North	Eddie Orrell (2011)	Progressive Conservative	2011
Cape Breton Nova	Gordie Gosse	NDP	2003
Cape Breton South	Manning MacDonald	Liberal	1993
Cape Breton South	Vacant		1993
Cape Breton West	Alfie MacLeod	Progressive Conservative	1995, 2006
Chester-St. Margaret's	Denise Peterson-Rafuse	NDP	2009
Clare	Wayne Gaudet	Liberal	1993
Colchester-Musquodoboit Valley	Gary Burrill	NDP	2009
Colchester North	Karen Casey	Progressive Conservative	2006
Colchester North	Karen Casey	Liberal	2006
Cole Harbour	Darrell Dexter	NDP	1998
Cole Harbour-Eastern Passage	Becky Kent	NDP	2007
Cumberland North	Brian Skabar	NDP	2009
Cumberland South	Murray Scott	Progressive Conservative	1998
Cumberland South	Jamie Baillie (2010)	Progressive Conservative	2010
Dartmouth East	Andrew Younger	Liberal	2009
Dartmouth North	Trevor Zinck	NDP	2006
Dartmouth North	Trevor Zinck	Independent	2006
Dartmouth North	Vacant		2006
Dartmouth South-Portland Valley	Marilyn More	NDP	2003
Digby-Annapolis	Harold Theriault, Jr.	Liberal	2003
Eastern Shore	Sid Prest	NDP	2009
Glace Bay	David Wilson	Liberal	1999
Glace Bay	Geoff MacLellan (2010)	Liberal	2010
Guysborough-Sheet Harbour	Jim Boudreau	NDP	2009
Halifax Atlantic	Michèle Raymond	NDP	2003
Halifax Chebucto	Howard Epstein	NDP	1998
Halifax Citadel-Sable Island	Leonard Preyra	NDP	2006
Halifax Clayton Park	Diana Whalen	Liberal	2003
Halifax Fairview	Graham Steele	NDP	2001
Halifax Needham	Maureen MacDonald	NDP	1998
Hammonds Plains-Upper Sackville	Mat Whynott	NDP	2009
Hants East	John MacDonell	NDP	1998
Hants West	Chuck Porter	Progressive Conservative	2006
Inverness	Rodney MacDonald	Progressive Conservative	1999
Inverness	Allan MacMaster (2009)	Progressive Conservative	2009
Kings North	Jim Morton	NDP	2009
Kings South	Ramona Jennex	NDP	2009
Kings West	Leo Glavine	Liberal	2003
Lunenburg	Pam Birdsall	NDP	2009
Lunenburg West	Gary Ramey	NDP	2009
Pictou Centre	Ross Landry	NDP	2009
Pictou East	Clarrie MacKinnon	NDP	2006
Pictou West	Charlie Parker	NDP	1998, 2003
Preston	Keith Colwell	Liberal	1993, (Note: Eastern Shore) 2003
Queens	Vicki Conrad	NDP	2006
Richmond	Michel Samson	Liberal	1998
Sackville-Cobequid	Dave Wilson	NDP	2003
Shelburne	Sterling Belliveau	NDP	2006
Timberlea-Prospect	Bill Estabrooks	NDP	1998
Truro-Bible Hill	Lenore Zann	NDP	2009
Victoria-The Lakes	Keith Bain	Progressive Conservative	2006
Waverley-Fall River-Beaverbank	Percy Paris	NDP	2006
Yarmouth	Richard Hurlburt	Progressive Conservative	1999
Yarmouth	Zach Churchill (2010)	Liberal	2010

== Seating plan ==
Churchill	Colwell	Theriault	MacLellan	Regan	Younger	*	MacMaster	Porter	Bain
Gaudet	Samson	Glavine	Whalen	MCNEIL	Casey	*	Orrell	BAILLIE	MacLeod	d'Entremont
****
Parker
****
Belliveau	More	Landry	MacDonald	Steele	****	DEXTER	Corbett	Peterson-Rafuse	Paris	Jennex	MacDonell	Estabrooks
MacKinnon	Wilson	Kent	Gosse	Conrad	****	Epstein	Raymond	Preyra	Skabar	Boudreau	Prest	Smith
****	****	Morton	Burrill	Birdsall	****	Ramey	Zann	Whynott

== Membership changes in the 61st Assembly ==
Number of members per party by date	2009				2010						2011			2013	
Number of members per party by date	Jun 9	Sep 4	Sep 10	Oct 20	Feb 9	Mar 11	Mar 25	Jun 22	Sep 8	Oct 26	Jan 10	Mar 25	Jun 21	May 29	June 19
NDP	31			32			31								
Liberal	11					10		12			13			12	
Progressive Conservative	10	9	8	9	8				7	8	7	6	7		
Independent	0						1								0
Total members	52	51	50	52	51	50		52	51	52		51	52	51	50
Vacant	0	1	2	0	1	2		0	1	0	1	0		1	2
Government majority	10	11	12		13	14	12	10	11	10		11	10	11	12

Membership changes in the 61st General Assembly
Date	Name	District	Party	Reason
June 9, 2009	See list of members			Election day of the 38th Nova Scotia general election
September 4, 2009	Angus MacIsaac	Antigonish	Progressive Conservative	Vacated seat
September 10, 2009	Rodney MacDonald	Inverness	Progressive Conservative	Vacated seat
October 20, 2009	Allan MacMaster	Inverness	Progressive Conservative	Elected in a by-election
October 20, 2009	Maurice Smith	Antigonish	NDP	Elected in a by-election
February 9, 2010	Richard Hurlburt	Yarmouth	Progressive Conservative	Vacated seat due to constituency expense scandal
March 11, 2010	David Wilson	Glace Bay	Liberal	Vacated seat
March 25, 2010	Trevor Zinck	Dartmouth North	Independent	Removed from the NDP caucus over constituency expense irregularities
June 22, 2010	Zach Churchill	Yarmouth	Liberal	Elected in a by-election
June 22, 2010	Geoff MacLellan	Glace Bay	Liberal	Elected in a by-election
September 8, 2010	Murray Scott	Cumberland South	Progressive Conservative	Vacated Seat
October 26, 2010	Jamie Baillie	Cumberland South	Progressive Conservative	Elected in a by-election
January 10, 2011	Karen Casey	Colchester North	Liberal	Crossed the floor from Progressive Conservatives
March 25, 2011	Cecil Clarke	Cape Breton North	Progressive Conservative	Vacated seat to run in the 2011 Canadian federal election
June 21, 2011	Eddie Orrell	Cape Breton North	Progressive Conservative	Elected in a by-election
May 29, 2013	Manning MacDonald	Cape Breton South	Liberal	Vacated Seat
June 19, 2013	Trevor Zinck	Dartmouth North	Independent	Vacated Seat

== Notes ==
Preceded by 60th General Assembly of Nova Scotia	General Assemblies of Nova Scotia; 2009–2013	Succeeded by 62nd General Assembly of Nova Scotia
