= Parliamentary expenses scandal =

Parliamentary expenses scandal may refer to:

- Canadian Senate expenses scandal, 2012
- Nova Scotia parliamentary expenses scandal, 2010
- United Kingdom parliamentary expenses scandal, 2009
