= Jerry Pye =

Canadian politician

MLA for Dartmouth North
- In office 1998–2006
- Preceded by: Sandy Jolly
- Succeeded by: Trevor Zinck

Personal details
- Born: 1947 (age 78–79)
- Party: NDP

Jerry Pye is a Canadian politician and member of the Nova Scotia House of Assembly, representing the riding of Dartmouth North for the Nova Scotia New Democratic Party. He was first elected in the 1998 election, and was re-elected in 1999 and 2003.

Pye chose not to run for re-election in the 2006 election, leaving politics. His successor, Trevor Zinck, won the election.

Pye re-entered politics in September 2012, running for District 6 Councillor in the Halifax Regional Municipality municipal election.

His son, Brad Pye, was the NDP candidate in Dartmouth—Cole Harbour in the 40th Canadian federal election.

In 2025, Pye was awarded the King Charles III Coronation Medal by David McGuinty in recognition of his decades of advocacy for persons with disabilities, among other notable accomplishments.
