= George Doucet =

Canadian politician (1939–2024)

MLA for Halifax Cobequid
- In office 1974–1978
- Preceded by: George Riley
- Succeeded by: riding dissolved

Speaker of the House of Assembly of Nova Scotia
- In office 1977–1978
- Preceded by: Vince MacLean
- Succeeded by: Ron Russell

Personal details
- Born: March 28, 1939 Quebec City, Quebec
- Died: January 23, 2024 (aged 84) Falmouth, Nova Scotia
- Party: Liberal
- Occupation: Principal

George Raymond Doucet (March 28, 1939 – January 23, 2024) was a Canadian educator and political figure in Nova Scotia. He represented Halifax Cobequid in the Nova Scotia House of Assembly from 1974 to 1978 as a Liberal. He was born in Quebec City, Quebec, the son of Herbert Louis Doucet and Agnes Boudreau. He was educated there, at St. Francis Xavier University and at the École Normale in Laval, Quebec. In 1961, he married Virginia Ann McMaster. Doucet entered provincial politics in the 1974 election, winning the Halifax Cobequid riding. He served as Speaker of the House of Assembly of Nova Scotia from 1977 to 1978. In the 1978 election, Doucet ran in the new riding of Sackville, and was defeated by Progressive Conservative Malcolm A. MacKay. Doucet died on January 23, 2024, at the age of 84.
