= Joanne Bernard =

Canadian politician

The Honourable Joanne Bernard ECNS

Member of the Nova Scotia House of Assembly for Dartmouth North
- In office October 8, 2013 – May 30, 2017
- Preceded by: Trevor Zinck
- Succeeded by: Susan Leblanc

Personal details
- Born: October 4, 1963 (age 62)
- Party: Liberal

Joanne Lynn Bernard (born October 4, 1963) is a Canadian politician, who was elected to the Nova Scotia House of Assembly in the 2013 provincial election. As a member of the Nova Scotia Liberal Party, she represented the electoral district of Dartmouth North until her defeat in the 2017 election.

== Early life and education ==
Bernard grew up in Halifax and graduated from Mount Saint Vincent University in 1996 with a Bachelor of Arts degree. She then earned a master's degree in political science from Acadia University. She also received a Certificate of Leadership from Saint Mary's University.

== Political career ==
On October 22, 2013, Bernard was appointed to the Executive Council of Nova Scotia, where she served as Minister of Community Services as well as Minister responsible for the Disabled Persons Commission Act and Minister Responsible for the Status of Women.

== Personal life ==
Bernard is an out lesbian; she was the first openly LGBT person elected to the provincial legislature in Nova Scotia.

== Electoral record ==
2017 Nova Scotia general election: Dartmouth North
Party	Candidate	Votes	%	±%
New Democratic	Susan Leblanc	2,771	39.36	+9.22
Liberal	Joanne Bernard	2,442	34.68	-9.38
Progressive Conservative	Melanie Russell	1,384	19.66	-5.42
Green	Tyler Colburne	318	4.52	
Atlantica	David Boyd	126	1.79	
Total valid votes		7,041	100	
Total rejected ballots		33	0.47	
Turnout		7,074	42.7	
Eligible voters		16,566		
New Democratic gain from Liberal		Swing		+9.30
Source: Elections Nova Scotia

2013 Nova Scotia general election
Party	Candidate	Votes	%	±%
Liberal	Joanne Bernard	2,953	44.06	
New Democratic Party	Steve Estey	2,020	30.14	
Progressive Conservative	Séan G. Brownlow	1,729	25.08	
