= Cumberland East =

Former provincial electoral district in Nova Scotia, Canada

Nova Scotia electoral district

Defunct provincial electoral district
- Legislature: Nova Scotia House of Assembly
- District created: 1949
- District abolished: 1993
- Last contested: 1988

Cumberland East was a provincial electoral district in Nova Scotia, Canada, that elected one member of the Nova Scotia House of Assembly. It existed from 1949 to 1993. It was formed in 1949 when Cumberland County was divided into three new districts, the other two being Cumberland Centre and Cumberland West.

== Members of the Legislative Assembly ==
This electoral district elected the following members of the Legislative Assembly:

Cumberland East
Legislature	Years	Member	Party
District created from Cumberland County (1867–1949)
44th	1949–1953	Martin J. Kaufman	Liberal
45th	1953–1956	James A. Langille	Progressive Conservative
46th	1956–1960	James A. Langille	Progressive Conservative
47th	1960–1963	James A. Langille	Progressive Conservative
48th	1963–1967	James A. Langille	Progressive Conservative
49th	1967–1970	James A. Langille	Progressive Conservative
50th	1970–1974	Roger Stuart Bacon	Progressive Conservative
51st	1974–1978	Roger Stuart Bacon	Progressive Conservative
52nd	1978–1981	Roger Stuart Bacon	Progressive Conservative
53rd	1981–1984	Roger Stuart Bacon	Progressive Conservative
54th	1984–1988	Roger Stuart Bacon	Progressive Conservative
55th	1988–1993	Roger Stuart Bacon	Progressive Conservative

== Election results ==
=== 1988 ===
1988 Nova Scotia general election
Party	Candidate	Votes	%	±%
Progressive Conservative	Roger Stuart Bacon	4,758	52.31%	-9.04%
Liberal	Carolyn Drysdale	3,276	36.02%	6.22%
New Democratic	Jim Mitchell	1,062	11.68%	2.82%
Total		9,096	–	
Source(s) Source: Nova Scotia Legislature (2024). "Electoral History for Cumberland East" (PDF). nslegislature.ca. Nova Scotia, Chief Electoral Officer (1988). Returns of the General Election for the House of Assembly, Thirty-Second General Election (PDF) (Report). Queen's Printer. Archived from the original (PDF) on 7 July 2018.

=== 1984 ===
1984 Nova Scotia general election
Party	Candidate	Votes	%	±%
Progressive Conservative	Roger Stuart Bacon	4,837	61.35%	8.27%
Liberal	Ira Drysdale	2,349	29.79%	10.34%
New Democratic	Barbara Anne Marsden	698	8.85%	-18.61%
Total		7,884	–	
Source(s) Source: Nova Scotia Legislature (2024). "Electoral History for Cumberland East" (PDF). nslegislature.ca. Nova Scotia, Chief Electoral Officer (1984). Returns of the General Election for the House of Assembly, Thirty-First General Election (PDF) (Report). Queen's Printer. Archived from the original (PDF) on 31 July 2017.

=== 1981 ===
1981 Nova Scotia general election
Party	Candidate	Votes	%	±%
Progressive Conservative	Roger Stuart Bacon	4,663	53.08%	0.75%
New Democratic	Hal Davidson	2,413	27.47%	13.95%
Liberal	Shelagh R. Frances	1,709	19.45%	-14.70%
Total		8,785	–	
Source(s) Source: Nova Scotia Legislature (2024). "Electoral History for Cumberland East" (PDF). nslegislature.ca. Nova Scotia, Chief Electoral Officer (1981). Returns of the General Election for the House of Assembly, Thirtieth General Election (PDF) (Report). Queen's Printer. Archived from the original (PDF) on 31 July 2017.

=== 1978 ===
1978 Nova Scotia general election
Party	Candidate	Votes	%	±%
Progressive Conservative	Roger Stuart Bacon	4,955	52.33%	4.08%
Liberal	Norman J. Mansour	3,234	34.15%	-6.67%
New Democratic	Francis Soontiens	1,280	13.52%	2.59%
Total		9,469	–	
Source(s) Source: Nova Scotia Legislature (2024). "Electoral History for Cumberland East" (PDF). nslegislature.ca. Nova Scotia, Chief Electoral Officer (1978). Returns of the General Election for the House of Assembly, Twenty-Ninth General Election (PDF) (Report). Queen's Printer. Archived from the original (PDF) on 18 June 2018.

=== 1974 ===
1974 Nova Scotia general election
Party	Candidate	Votes	%	±%
Progressive Conservative	Roger Stuart Bacon	4,125	48.25%	-3.64%
Liberal	Ronald S. MacNeil	3,490	40.82%	3.38%
New Democratic	David W. D'Aubin	934	10.93%	0.26%
Total		8,549	–	
Source(s) Source: Nova Scotia Legislature (2024). "Electoral History for Cumberland East" (PDF). nslegislature.ca. Nova Scotia, Chief Electoral Officer (1974). Returns of the General Election for the House of Assembly, Twenty-Eighth General Election (PDF) (Report). Queen's Printer. Archived from the original (PDF) on 18 June 2018.

=== 1970 ===
1970 Nova Scotia general election
Party	Candidate	Votes	%	±%
Progressive Conservative	Roger Stuart Bacon	4,355	51.89%	-3.27%
Liberal	Leonard J. Dolan	3,142	37.44%	-0.70%
New Democratic	James M. MacSwain	895	10.66%	3.97%
Total		8,392	–	
Source(s) Source: Nova Scotia Legislature (2024). "Electoral History for Cumberland East" (PDF). nslegislature.ca. Nova Scotia, Legislative Assembly (1970). Returns of the General Election for the House of Assembly, 1970 (PDF) (Report). Queen's Printer. Archived from the original (PDF) on 25 July 2018.

=== 1967 ===
1967 Nova Scotia general election
Party	Candidate	Votes	%	±%
Progressive Conservative	James A. Langille	4,415	55.16%	-7.94%
Liberal	Howard R. Furlong	3,053	38.14%	4.40%
New Democratic	John E. Burbine	536	6.70%	3.55%
Total		8,004	–	
Source(s) Source: Nova Scotia Legislature (2024). "Electoral History for Cumberland East" (PDF). nslegislature.ca. Nova Scotia Legislature (1967). Returns of the General Election for the House of Assembly (PDF) (Report). Queen's Printer. Archived from the original (PDF) on 25 July 2018.

=== 1963 ===
1963 Nova Scotia general election
Party	Candidate	Votes	%	±%
Progressive Conservative	James A. Langille	5,226	63.10%	6.02%
Liberal	Norman Willard Noonan	2,795	33.75%	-5.25%
New Democratic	Lloyd L. Ayer	261	3.15%	-0.87%
Total		8,282	–	
Source(s) Source: Nova Scotia Legislature (2024). "Electoral History for Cumberland East" (PDF). nslegislature.ca. Nova Scotia Legislature (1963). Returns of the General Election for the House of Assembly (PDF) (Report). Queen's Printer. Archived from the original (PDF) on 25 July 2018.

=== 1960 ===
1960 Nova Scotia general election
Party	Candidate	Votes	%	±%
Progressive Conservative	James A. Langille	5,081	57.08%	6.49%
Liberal	Walter Tremaine Purdy	3,471	39.00%	-10.41%
Co-operative Commonwealth	Lloyd L. Ayer	349	3.92%	–
Total		8,901	–	
Source(s) Source: Nova Scotia Legislature (2024). "Electoral History for Cumberland East" (PDF). nslegislature.ca. Nova Scotia Legislature (1960). Returns of the General Election for the House of Assembly (PDF) (Report). Queen's Printer. Archived from the original (PDF) on 25 July 2018.

=== 1956 ===
1956 Nova Scotia general election
Party	Candidate	Votes	%	±%
Progressive Conservative	James A. Langille	4,406	50.59%	-0.45%
Liberal	Walter Tremaine Purdy	4,303	49.41%	0.45%
Total		8,709	–	
Source(s) Source: Nova Scotia Legislature (2024). "Electoral History for Cumberland East" (PDF). nslegislature.ca. Nova Scotia Legislature (1956). Returns of the General Election for the House of Assembly (PDF) (Report). Queen's Printer. Archived from the original (PDF) on 10 September 2018.

=== 1953 ===
1953 Nova Scotia general election
Party	Candidate	Votes	%	±%
Progressive Conservative	James A. Langille	4,393	51.04%	8.94%
Liberal	Martin J. Kaufman	4,214	48.96%	-0.83%
Total		8,607	–	
Source(s) Source: Nova Scotia Legislature (2024). "Electoral History for Cumberland East" (PDF). nslegislature.ca. Nova Scotia Legislature (1953). Returns of the General Election for the House of Assembly (PDF) (Report). Queen's Printer. Archived from the original (PDF) on 10 September 2018.

=== 1949 ===
1949 Nova Scotia general election
Party	Candidate	Votes	%	±%
Liberal	Martin J. Kaufman	4,280	49.79%	–
Progressive Conservative	Arnold G. McLellan	3,619	42.10%	–
Co-operative Commonwealth	Brenton Garnhum	697	8.11%	–
Total		8,596	–	
Source(s) Source: Nova Scotia Legislature (2024). "Electoral History for Cumberland East" (PDF). nslegislature.ca. Nova Scotia Legislature (1949). Returns of the General Election for the House of Assembly (PDF) (Report). Queen's Printer. Archived from the original (PDF) on 10 September 2018.

== See also ==
- List of Nova Scotia provincial electoral districts
- Canadian provincial electoral districts
