= Laird Stirling =

Canadian politician and minister (1938–2020)

The Honourable Reverend Laird Stirling ECNS

MLA for Dartmouth North
- In office 1978–1988
- Preceded by: Glen M. Bagnell
- Succeeded by: Sandy Jolly

Personal details
- Born: August 22, 1938 Noranda, Quebec, Canada
- Died: March 2, 2020 (aged 81) Dartmouth, Nova Scotia, Canada
- Party: Progressive Conservative
- Occupation: Minister

R. Laird Stirling (August 22, 1938 – March 2, 2020) was a Canadian politician and minister. He represented the electoral district of Dartmouth North in the Nova Scotia House of Assembly from 1978 to 1988. He was a member of the Nova Scotia Progressive Conservative Party.

Stirling was born in Noranda, Quebec. He attended Pine Hill Divinity Hall and McMaster University. He was a minister and has also worked as a hospital chaplain. He was married to Carolyn Wilson.

Stirling entered provincial politics in the 1978 election, defeating Liberal cabinet minister Glen Bagnell by over 1,600 votes in Dartmouth North. In June 1979, Stirling was appointed to the Executive Council of Nova Scotia as Minister of Social Services. He was re-elected in the 1981 election, and was moved to Minister of Consumer Affairs in December 1981. Following his re-election in 1984, Stirling continued to serve as Minister of Consumer Affairs until February 1987, when he was moved to Minister of Environment. In November 1987, Stirling was shuffled again, becoming Minister of Municipal Affairs. He was defeated when he ran for re-election in 1988, losing to Liberal Sandy Jolly by 121 votes. Stirling died on March 2, 2020.
