= 1967 Nova Scotia general election =

Canadian provincial election

- May 30, 1967

46 seats of the Nova Scotia House of Assembly 24 seats needed for a majority
- Turnout: 77.00% ▼0.87pp
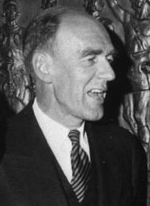

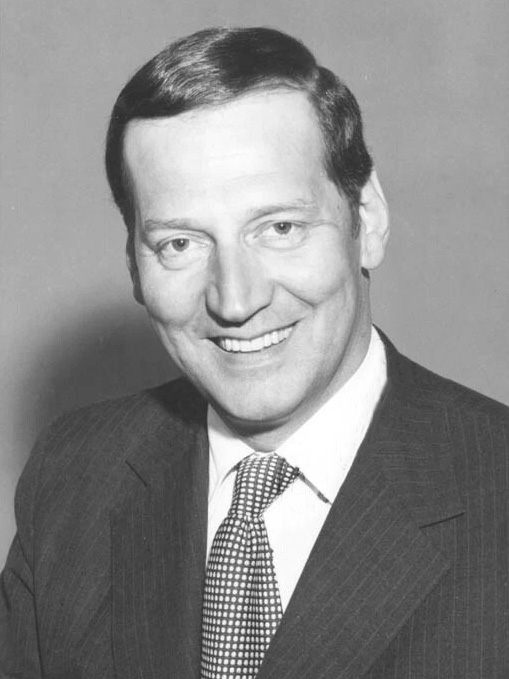
| | First party | Second party | Third party |
|---|---|---|---|
| | | | NDP |
| Leader | Robert Stanfield | Gerald Regan | James H. Aitchison |
| Party | Progressive Conservative | Liberal | New Democratic |
| Leader since | November 10, 1948 | July 24, 1965 | 1963 |
| Leader's seat | Colchester | Ran in Halifax Needham (won) | Ran in Cape Breton East (lost) |
| Last election | 39 | 4 | 0 |
| Seats won | 40 | 6 | 0 |
| Seat change | ▲1 | ▲2 | Steady |
| Popular vote | 180,498 | 142,945 | 17,873 |
| Percentage | 52.39% | 41.49% | 5.19% |
| Swing | ▼3.48pp | ▲2.06pp | ▲1.08pp |
Premier before election
Robert Stanfield
Progressive Conservative
Premier after election
Robert Stanfield
Progressive Conservative

The 1967 Nova Scotia general election was held on 30 May 1967 to elect members of the 49th House of Assembly of the Province of Nova Scotia, Canada. It was won by the Progressive Conservative Party.

== Results ==
=== Results by party ===
↓
| 40 | 6 |
| Progressive Conservative | Liberal |

Official results
| Party | Party leader | # of candidates | Seats | | | | Popular vote | | |
| Party | Party leader | # of candidates | 1963 | Dissolution | Elected | Change | # | % | Change (pp) |
|---|---|---|---|---|---|---|---|---|---|
| Progressive Conservative | Robert Stanfield | 46 | 39 | 39 | 40 | +1 | 180,498 | 52.39% | -3.48% |
| Liberal | Gerald Regan | 46 | 4 | 4 | 6 | +2 | 142,945 | 41.49% | +2.06% |
| New Democratic | James H. Aitchison | 24 | 0 | 0 | 0 | 0 | 17,873 | 5.19% | +1.08% |
| Independent | | 2 | 0 | 0 | 0 | 0 | 498 | 0.14% | +0.14% |
| Vacant | | | | 0 | | | | | |
| Total valid votes | | | | | | | 341,814 | 99.22% | -0.20% |
| Blank and invalid ballots | | | | | | | 2,703 | 0.78% | +0.20% |
| Total | | 118 | 43 | 43 | 46 | +3 | 344,517 | 100.00% | – |
| Registered voters / turnout | | | | | | | 405,714 | 77.00% | -0.87% |

Popular vote
| PC | 52.39% |
| Liberal | 41.49% |
| New Democratic | 5.19% |
| Independent | 0.14% |

Seats summary
| PC | 86.96% |
| Liberal | 13.04% |

=== Results by region ===
| Party name | | HRM | Cape Breton | Annapolis Valley | South Shore | Fundy-Northeast | Central Nova | Total |
Parties winning seats in the legislature
| Progressive Conservative | Seats: | 7 | 9 | 6 | 7 | 6 | 5 | 40 |
| Progressive Conservative | Popular vote: | 50.77% | 51.07% | 51.92% | 53.02% | 58.77% | 54.15% | 52.39% |
| Liberal | Seats: | 3 | 1 | 2 | 0 | 0 | 0 | 6 |
| Liberal | Popular vote: | 44.82% | 35.54% | 47.51% | 44.18% | 37.58% | 43.46% | 41.49% |
Parties not winning seats in the legislature
| New Democratic | Popular vote: | 4.42% | 13.17% | 0.57% | 2.13% | 3.66% | 2.39% | 5.19% |
| Independent | Popular vote: | – | 0.22% | – | 0.68% | – | – | 0.14% |
| Total seats: | | 10 | 10 | 8 | 7 | 6 | 5 | 46 |

== Retiring incumbents ==
Liberal

- Carleton L. MacMillan, Victoria

Progressive Conservative

- George A. Burridge, Yarmouth
- Paul Kinsman, Kings West
- Gladys Porter, Kings North

== Nominated candidates ==
Legend
bold denotes party leader
† denotes an incumbent who is not running for re-election or was defeated in nomination contest

=== Valley ===
| Electoral district | Candidates | | | | Incumbent |
| Electoral district | PC | Liberal | NDP | Independent | Incumbent |
|---|---|---|---|---|---|
| Annapolis East | John I. Marshall; 2,866; 56.13% | Malcolm Balcom; 2,240; 43.87% | | | John I. Marshall |
| Annapolis West | Kenneth Green; 1,981; 45.87% | Peter M. Nicholson; 2,338; 54.13% | | | Peter M. Nicholson |
| Clare | Hector J. Pothier; 1,841; 43.57% | Benoit Comeau; 2,384; 56.43% | | | Hector J. Pothier |
| Digby | Robert Baden Powell; 2,524; 51.31% | Phillip R. Woolaver; 2,395; 48.69% | | | Robert Baden Powell |
| Hants West | Norman T. Spence; 3,765; 51.96% | Robert D. Lindsay; 3,481; 48.04% | | | Norman T. Spence |
| Kings North | Victor Thorpe; 3,407; 55.25% | Victor Cleyle; 2,759; 44.75% | | | Gladys Porter† |
| Kings South | Edward Haliburton; 2,515; 62.89% | Bruce Trenholm; 1,484; 37.11% | | | Edward Haliburton |
| Kings West | Gordon Tidman; 3,619; 48.98% | Frank Bezanson; 3,522; 47.67% | Ralph Loomer; 247; 3.34% | | Paul Kinsman† |

=== South Shore ===
| Electoral district | Candidates | | | | Incumbent |
| Electoral district | PC | Liberal | NDP | Independent | Incumbent |
|---|---|---|---|---|---|
| Lunenburg Centre | George O. Lohnes; 4,229; 51.46% | Walton Cook; 3,760; 45.75% | Earl Croft; 229; 2.79% | | George O. Lohnes |
| Lunenburg East | Maurice L. Zinck; 2,100; 55.87% | Fred Porter Jr. 1,659; 44.13% | | | Maurice L. Zinck |
| Lunenburg West | Harley J. Spence; 2,564; 50.00% | Carroll Young; 2,396; 46.72% | Wilson Touchie; 168; 3.28% | | Harley J. Spence |
| Queens | W. S. Kennedy Jones; 3,290; 57.69% | G. Cecil Day; 2,413; 42.31% | | | W. S. Kennedy Jones |
| Shelburne | James McKay Harding; 3,271; 46.60% | Harold Huskilson; 3,111; 44.32% | Aubrey Harding; 638; 9.09% | | James McKay Harding |
| Yarmouth | Benoit Robichaud; 5,003; 26.56% | Fraser Mooney; 4,463; 23.69% | | Willard F. Allen; 329; 1.75% | George A. Burridge† |
| Yarmouth | George A. Snow; 5,345; 28.37% | Earle Maberley; 3,699; 19.63% | | | George A. Snow |

=== Fundy-Northeast ===
| Electoral district | Candidates | | | | Incumbent |
| Electoral district | PC | Liberal | NDP | Independent | Incumbent |
|---|---|---|---|---|---|
| Colchester | **Robert Stanfield**; 9,091; 31.04% | George Pulsifer; 5,344; 18.25% | Arthur Benedict; 507; 1.73% | | Robert Stanfield |
| Colchester | George Isaac Smith; 8,485; 28.97% | Charles Sutherland; 5,348; 18.26% | Cecil Delaney; 509; 1.74% | | George Isaac Smith |
| Cumberland Centre | Stephen T. Pyke; 2,437; 67.34% | Charles H. Sarson; 1,022; 28.24% | J. Reginald Daborn; 160; 4.42% | | Stephen T. Pyke |
| Cumberland East | James A. Langille; 4,415; 55.16% | Howard R. Furlong; 3,053; 38.14% | John Burbine; 536; 6.70% | | James A. Langille |
| Cumberland West | D. L. George Henley; 2,506; 57.81% | Ruth Fullerton; 1,698; 39.17% | Shirley Spicer; 131; 3.02% | | D. L. George Henley |
| Hants East | Albert J. Ettinger; 2,697; 52.08% | Norman E. Casey; 2,482; 47.92% | | | Albert J. Ettinger |

=== Halifax/Dartmouth/Eastern Shore ===
| Electoral district | Candidates | | | | Incumbent |
| Electoral district | PC | Liberal | NDP | Independent | Incumbent |
|---|---|---|---|---|---|
| Halifax Atlantic | John Buchanan; 4,507; 53.74% | Percy Baker; 3,556; 42.40% | Charles Grineault; 324; 3.86% | | New riding |
| Halifax Chebucto | James H. Vaughan; 5,154; 52.01% | K. Peter Richard; 4,253; 42.92% | Keith Jobson; 503; 5.08% | | James H. Vaughan; Halifax North |
| Halifax Citadel | Donald MacKeen Smith; 4,771; 55.41% | Robert Matheson; 3,522; 40.91% | M. Rae Gillman; 317; 3.68% | | Donald MacKeen Smith; Halifax Centre |
| Halifax Cobequid | Gordon H. Fitzgerald; 5,463; 51.51% | John F. Cruickshank; 5,143; 48.49% | | | Gordon H. Fitzgerald; Halifax Northwest |
| Halifax Cornwallis | Richard Donahoe; 5,458; 56.39% | Clarence L. Gosse; 4,221; 43.61% | | | Richard Donahoe; Halifax South |
| Halifax Eastern Shore | Nelson Gaetz; 3,682; 43.36% | Duncan MacMillan; 4,201; 49.48% | James Yetman; 608; 7.16% | | Nelson Gaetz; Halifax East |
| Halifax Needham | Cecil Moore; 3,252; 46.72% | **Gerald Regan**; 3,354; 48.18% | Buddy Daye; 355; 5.10% | | New riding |
| Halifax-St. Margaret's | D. C. McNeil; 5,030; 53.48% | Alex McNeil; 3,910; 41.57% | Peggy Prowse; 466; 4.95% | | D. C. McNeil; Halifax West |
| Dartmouth North | Charles Clarke; 4,301; 43.62% | Gordon L. S. Hart; 4,906; 49.75% | Perry Ronayne; 654; 6.63% | | New Riding |
| Dartmouth South | Irvin William Akerley; 4,552; 50.37% | Eileen Stubbs; 3,694; 40.88% | Bruce Wallace; 791; 8.75% | | Irvin William Akerley; Halifax County-Dartmouth |

=== Central Nova ===
| Electoral district | Candidates | | | | Incumbent |
| Electoral district | PC | Liberal | NDP | Independent | Incumbent |
|---|---|---|---|---|---|
| Antigonish | William F. MacKinnon; 3,222; 50.20% | Bill Gillis; 3,196; 49.80% | | | William F. MacKinnon |
| Guysborough | Alexander MacIsaac; 3,154; 52.75% | Donald J. Gillis; 2,825; 47.25% | | | Alexander MacIsaac |
| Pictou Centre | Donald R. MacLeod; 5,416; 53.90% | John Brother MacDonald; 3,846; 38.28% | John Markie; 786; 7.82% | | Donald R. MacLeod |
| Pictou East | Thomas MacQueen; 2,876; 51.14% | A. Lloyd MacDonald; 2,748; 48.86% | | | A. Lloyd MacDonald |
| Pictou West | Harvey Veniot; 3,137; 65.20% | Edward Snow; 1,674; 34.80% | | | Harvey Veniot |

=== Cape Breton ===
| Electoral district | Candidates | | | | Incumbent |
| Electoral district | PC | Liberal | NDP | Independent | Incumbent |
|---|---|---|---|---|---|
| Cape Breton Centre | Mike Laffin; 3,565; 55.85% | William J. Boudreau; 1,313; 20.57% | Tom O'Leary; 1,505; 23.58% | | Mike Laffin |
| Cape Breton East | Layton Fergusson; 5,094; 53.29% | William O'Leary; 1,417; 14.82% | **James H. Aitchison**; 3,048; 31.89% | | Layton Fergusson |
| Cape Breton North | Tom MacKeough; 5,574; 53.39% | Alexander O'Handley; 3,318; 31.90% | Gerald Yetman; 1,510; 14.52% | | Tom MacKeough |
| Cape Breton Nova | Percy Gaum; 2,873; 47.13% | Tom Miller; 1,829; 30.00% | Paul MacEwan; 1,394; 22.87% | | Percy Gaum |
| Cape Breton South | Donald C. MacNeil; 4,843; 47.18% | Charles O'Connell; 3,944; 38.42% | Charles Palmer; 1,309; 12.75% | Angus Currie; 169; 1.65% | Donald C. MacNeil |
| Cape Breton West | Edward Manson; 3,862; 43.95% | Allan Sullivan; 3,748; 42.65% | Jeremy Akerman; 1,178; 13.40% | | Edward Manson |
| Inverness | Norman J. MacLean; 3,994; 26.27% | William MacIsaac; 3,571; 23.49% | | | Norman J. MacLean |
| Inverness | Alfred Davis; 3,680; 24.21% | William N. MacLean; 3,956; 26.02% | | | William N. MacLean |
| Richmond | Gerald Doucet; 3,054; 59.42% | Rudolph J. Boudreau; 2,086; 40.58% | | | Gerald Doucet |
| Victoria | Fisher Hudson; 2,033; 55.01% | Duncan F. Buchanan; 1,663; 44.99% | | | Carleton L. MacMillan† |
