= Greg Kerr =

Canadian politician

The Honourable Greg J. Kerr ECNS

MLA for Annapolis West
- In office September 19, 1978 – May 25, 1993
- Preceded by: Peter M. Nicholson
- Succeeded by: Riding Dissolved

MP for West Nova
- In office October 14, 2008 – August 4, 2015
- Preceded by: Robert Thibault
- Succeeded by: Colin Fraser

Personal details
- Born: John Gregory Kerr; October 8, 1947 (age 78) Annapolis Royal, Nova Scotia
- Party: Conservative
- Spouse: Marcia Longmire
- Occupation: Farmer, logger, teacher

John Gregory Kerr (born October 8, 1947) is a Canadian politician. He was the Member of Parliament for West Nova from 2008 to 2015 and a member of the Nova Scotia House of Assembly from 1978 to 1993.

== Early life and education ==
Born in Annapolis Royal, he graduated from Annapolis Royal Regional Academy. He then graduated from Mount Allison University with a B.A. and B.Ed. After graduation, he taught at Bridgetown Regional High School.

== Political career ==
He represented Annapolis West in the Nova Scotia House of Assembly from 1978 to 1993 as a Progressive Conservative member. Kerr served in the Executive Council of Nova Scotia as Minister of Culture, Recreation and Fitness from 1980 to 1981, as Minister of the Environment from 1981 to 1983, as Minister of Finance from 1983 to 1993, as Minister of Housing from 1988 to 1989 and as Minister of Tourism and Culture from 1992 to 1993. Kerr was defeated when he ran for re-election in the 1993 election. He was an unsuccessful candidate for a seat in the House of Commons in 2006.

He was elected as the Conservative Party Member of Parliament for the electoral district of West Nova in the 2008 federal election. He served in the House of Commons as the Parliamentary Secretary to the Minister of Veterans Affairs.

In April 2014, Kerr announced that he is not running in the 2015 federal election.

== Personal life ==
Kerr married his high-school girlfriend, Marica Longmire in 1970. They live in Granville Centre, Nova Scotia and own a beef farm and logging operation. The couple have two children, Gillian and Megan. He is an active warden in the Anglican Church.

In January 2013, Kerr suffered a stroke.

== Electoral record ==
2006 Canadian federal election: West Nova
Party	Candidate	Votes	%	±%	Expenditures
Liberal	Robert Thibault	17,734	39.24	-3.42	$53,606.19
Conservative	Greg Kerr	17,222	38.11	+5.06	$54,945.96
New Democratic	Arthur Bull	8,512	18.84	-2.29	$25,148.83
Green	Matthew Granger	1,040	2.30	-0.92	$74.10
Independent	Ken Griffiths	681	1.51	–	$2,576.48
Total valid votes/expense limit		45,190	100.0		$79,451
Total rejected, unmarked and declined ballots		274	0.60	-0.21	
Turnout		45,464	63.68	-2.26	
Eligible voters		71,393			
Liberal hold		Swing		-4.24	

2008 Canadian federal election: West Nova
Party	Candidate	Votes	%	±%	Expenditures
Conservative	Greg Kerr	16,779	39.94	+1.83	$69,467.56
Liberal	Robert Thibault	15,185	36.15	-3.09	$57,096.02
New Democratic	George Barron	7,097	16.89	-1.95	$12,741.38
Green	Ronald Mills	2,106	5.01	+2.71	$123.04
Independent	Cindy M. Nesbitt	844	2.01	–	$10,570.22
Total valid votes/expense limit		42,011	100.0		$83,932
Total rejected, unmarked and declined ballots		304	0.72	+0.12	
Turnout		42,315	62.48	-1.20	
Eligible voters		67,722			
Conservative gain from Liberal		Swing		+2.46	

2011 Canadian federal election: West Nova
Party	Candidate	Votes	%	±%	Expenditures
Conservative	Greg Kerr	20,204	47.04	+7.10	$82,563.21
Liberal	Robert Thibault	15,632	36.39	+0.24	$62,177.30
New Democratic	George Barron	5,631	13.11	-3.78	$12,244.90
Green	Ross Johnson	1,487	3.46	-1.55	none listed
Total valid votes/expense limit		42,954	100.0		$86,810.95
Total rejected, unmarked and declined ballots		356	0.82	+0.10	
Turnout		43,310	63.75	+1.27	
Eligible voters		67,938			
Conservative hold		Swing		+3.43	
