= Gordon L. S. Hart =

Canadian politician

MLA for Dartmouth North
- In office 1967–1968
- Preceded by: riding established
- Succeeded by: Gerald G. Wambolt

MLA for Halifax County Dartmouth
- In office 1960–1963
- Preceded by: Geoffrey W. Stevens
- Succeeded by: Irvin William Akerley

Personal details
- Born: December 23, 1924 Halifax, Nova Scotia
- Died: September 28, 2010 (aged 85) Dartmouth, Nova Scotia
- Party: Nova Scotia Liberal Party
- Occupation: Lawyer

Gordon Leavitt Shaw Hart (December 23, 1924 – September 28, 2010) was a Canadian politician and judge. He represented the electoral district of Halifax County Dartmouth in the Nova Scotia House of Assembly from 1960 to 1963, and Dartmouth North from 1967 to 1968. He was a member of the Nova Scotia Liberal Party.

Born in 1924 at Halifax, Nova Scotia, Hart was a graduate of the University of King's College and Dalhousie University. A lawyer by career, he served as an alderman in Dartmouth, Nova Scotia from 1956 to 1960.

Hart entered provincial politics in the 1960 election, winning the Halifax County Dartmouth riding by 605 votes. He was defeated by Irvin William Akerley when he ran for re-election in 1963. Hart returned to politics in the 1967 election, winning the new Dartmouth North riding. He resigned on September 30, 1968, when he was appointed to the Trial Division of the Supreme Court of Nova Scotia. In 1978, he was elevated to the Appeals Division, where he served until his retirement in 2000. He died in Dartmouth on September 28, 2010.
