= Nova Scotia parliamentary expenses scandal =

The Nova Scotia parliamentary expenses scandal concerned the excessive expenses of several members of the Nova Scotia legislative assembly and the inadequacy of management processes and rules. Among other consequences of the scandal, 4 MLAs were charged with offences and convicted for fraud or breach of trust.

== Background ==
Part-way through the first session of the 61st General Assembly, the NDP, under Premier Darrell Dexter, announced that it would "eliminate an MLA severance payment as well as their ability to sell their office furniture and equipment." According to a report by the CBC, the MLA severance package alone cost the province over $600,000 after the preceding election. The province did not want MLAs who resigned or were defeated to profit from selling their office furniture, and wanted the furniture to become provincial property when the MLA was finished with it. The report viewed this as the first step in changing the rules regarding expenses of Nova Scotia MLAs.

On February 3, 2010, Nova Scotia's auditor general, Jacques Lapointe, released a 142-page report suggesting that for the period between July 2006 and June 2009, "several politicians had filed 'excessive and unreasonable' claims, in part because of inadequate spending controls." According to the CBC, MLAs in the Nova Scotia Legislature are "entitled to spend $45,000 a year in payments that require no receipts". Lapointe did not name any MLAs in his report and said that he had found no criminal wrongdoing. He hoped that more attention would be focused on repairing the expenses system rather than on assailing legislators individually.

In the wake of the Auditor General's report, Speaker Charlie Parker compiled a full list of "questionable expenses", which was made public on February 8.

On February 9, 2010, the first political casualty of the scandal occurred when Richard Hurlburt, Progressive Conservative MLA for Yarmouth, resigned days after the Auditor General's report had shown he had spent about $8,000 on a generator, for his home. The Speaker's list of expenses also showed that Hurlburt had "bought a 42-inch television worth $2,499, which he paid $579 to have installed" in his constituency office in Yarmouth.

On March 12, 2010, Dave Wilson, Liberal MLA for Glace Bay, unexpectedly resigned. It was later revealed by the CBC that the Auditor General had requested a meeting on February 24, with Wilson to discuss his expenses. On February 27, Wilson hired a lawyer, and did not go to the auditor general's meeting. Wilson was originally mentioned in the Auditor general's report for spending $400 on patio furniture. When the opposition parties released figures on how much their MLAs had spent in regards to pay for employees of their constituency office, it was shown that Wilson had spent the largest amount, paying one staffer $24,000 extra over an 18-month period, and $37,000 to others over a three-year period.

== Criminal charges ==
On February 14, 2011, after an eight-month investigation, Hurlburt, Wilson, NDP/independent MLA Trevor Zinck and former Liberal cabinet minister/independent MLA Russell MacKinnon were all charged with fraud of over $5,000 and breach of trust by a public officer. Zinck was charged with two counts of theft of over $5,000, and Hurlburt, Wilson and MacKinnon were charged with uttering a forged document.

In September 2011, Wilson pleaded guilty to one count each of uttering forged documents, fraud and breach of trust, and was sentenced to 9 months in jail and 18 months of probation in April 2012.

On April 12, 2012, Hurlburt pleaded guilty to fraud and breach of trust. He was sentenced to 1 year of house arrest and 1 year of probation.

MacKinnon planned to fight the charges against him in court. He eventually pleaded guilty to breach of trust and received a 1 year conditional sentence, followed by 1 year of probation.

A preliminary hearing for Zinck had been postponed several times and his trial date was set for June 10, 2013. During his trial, Zinck pleaded guilty to criminal counts of fraud and breach of trust, and was sentenced to imprisonment for 4 months, followed by probation for 1 year.

== Members involved and their claims ==
Note: The table below counts the total amount claimed by the MLA in expenses. However, not all of these claims are for illegitimate purposes.

Name	Party	Riding	Expenses (July 2006 – June 2009)	Repaid	Notes
Darrell Dexter	NDP	Cole Harbour	$19,299.63	$7,600	Premier of Nova Scotia.
Keith Colwell	Liberal	Preston	$15,333.03	$252 for Art bought from his brother	Awaiting Speaker's instructions on what to do with the rest of the money
Ron Chisholm	Progressive Conservative	Formerly Guysborough-Sheet Harbour	$9,708.55		Defeated in 2009
Leonard Preyra	NDP	Halifax Citadel-Sable Island	$25,733.20		
Charlie Parker	NDP	Pictou West	$7,004.65		Speaker of the House
Richard Hurlburt	Progressive Conservative	Formerly Yarmouth	$33,220.18	Generator in home	Resigned after the expenses were made public
Len Goucher	Progressive Conservative	Formerly Bedford	$38,694.14		The highest amount of expenses claimed by an MLA. Defeated in 2009.
Karen Casey	Progressive Conservative	Colchester North	$17,463.23		Interim Leader of the Progressive Conservatives
Wayne Gaudet	Liberal	Clare	$16,067.20		
Howard Epstein	NDP	Halifax Chebucto	$14,206.87		
Rodney MacDonald	Progressive Conservative	Formerly Inverness	$9,558.00		Former Premier of Nova Scotia
John MacDonell	NDP	Hants East	$26,790.75		Minister of Natural Resources
Michel Samson	Liberal	Richmond	$13,150.50		
Dave Wilson	Liberal	Formerly Glace Bay	$13,260.16		Resigned in March 2010
Trevor Zinck	NDP	Dartmouth North	$8,533.24		
H. Dave Wilson	NDP	Sackville-Cobequid	$11,892.98		
Sterling Belliveau	NDP	Shelburne	$15,642.59		Minister of Fisheries and Minister of the Environment
Keith Bain	Progressive Conservative	Victoria-The Lakes	$15,486.29		
Cecil Clarke	Progressive Conservative	Cape Breton North	$20,044.33		
Barry Barnet	Progressive Conservative	Formerly Hammonds Plains-Upper Sackville	$8,616.94		Defeated in 2009
Carolyn Bolivar-Getson	Progressive Conservative	Formerly Lunenburg West	$17,512.32	Returned Generator and Plasma TV	Defeated in 2009
Vicki Conrad	NDP	Queens	$15,830.32		
Bill Estabrooks	NDP	Timberlea-Prospect	$2,043.96		The lowest amount of expenses claimed by an MLA.
Frank Corbett	NDP	Cape Breton Centre	$8,887.15		NDP House Leader, previously apologized for expenses related to celebratory meals.
Chris d'Entremont	Progressive Conservative	Argyle	$14,268.40		Former Minister of Finance
