= Martin J. Kaufman =

Canadian politician

MLA for Cumberland East
- In office 1949–1953
- Preceded by: new riding
- Succeeded by: James A. Langille

MLA for Cumberland
- In office 1945–1949
- Preceded by: Archie B. Smith
- Succeeded by: riding dissolved

Personal details
- Born: 1883 Montreal, Quebec
- Died: May 30, 1961 (aged 77–78) Amherst, Nova Scotia
- Party: Liberal
- Occupation: businessman

Martin James Kaufman (1883 – May 30, 1961) was a Canadian politician and businessman. He represented the electoral districts of Cumberland and Cumberland East in the Nova Scotia House of Assembly from 1945 to 1953. He was a member of the Nova Scotia Liberal Party.

Born in 1883 at Montreal, Kaufman moved to Amherst, Nova Scotia in 1922. In 1923, he established the Maritime Pant Company. Kaufman was elected mayor of Amherst in 1936. He entered provincial politics in the 1945 election, where he was elected in the dual-member Cumberland riding with Liberal Kenneth Judson Cochrane. In the 1949 election, Kaufman was re-elected in the new Cumberland East riding. He was defeated by Progressive Conservative James A. Langille when he ran for re-election in 1953. Kaufman returned to municipal politics and served another term as mayor of Amherst, from 1953 to 1956. Kaufman died in Amherst on May 30, 1961.
