= Susan Leblanc =

Canadian politician and actor

Susan Leblanc MLA

House Leader of the Nova Scotia New Democratic Party
- Incumbent
- Assumed office July 1, 2022
- Leader: Claudia Chender

Critic, Health; Communities, Culture, Tourism & Heritage; Film and the Television
- Incumbent
- Assumed office July 1, 2022
- Leader: Claudia Chender

Member of the Nova Scotia House of Assembly for Dartmouth North
- Incumbent
- Assumed office May 30, 2017
- Preceded by: Joanne Bernard

Personal details
- Born: October 1, 1973 (age 53) Winnipeg, Manitoba, Canada
- Party: New Democratic Party
- Occupation: Actor, artistic director

Susan Leblanc (born October 1, 1973) is a Canadian politician and actor who was elected to the Nova Scotia House of Assembly in the 2017 provincial election. She was re-elected in 2021 and 2024. A member of the Nova Scotia New Democratic Party, she represents the electoral district of Dartmouth North.

As of August 2025, Leblanc serves as the Official Opposition critic for Communities, Culture, Tourism and Heritage, Service Nova Scotia, Status of Women and Energy. Leblanc also serves as the New Democrat Caucus Chair.

== Early life and education ==
Leblanc was born in Winnipeg, Manitoba but grew up in Prospect Bay, Nova Scotia. She graduated from University of King's College in 1998 with a bachelor of arts (honours) in theatre and acting.

== Career ==
For 20 years, Leblanc was an actor on stage and film, most notably as one of the leading members and the artistic director of the Zuppa Theatre Company. In her film career, she was also known as Susan Leblanc-Crawford.

In 2026, Leblanc endorsed Rob Ashton in that year's federal NDP leadership race.

== Filmography ==
=== Film ===
Year	Title	Role	Notes
2002	The Lighter Game	Cara	Short
2004	Table Dancer		Short
2005	The Heavy Breather	Leslie - Script Supervisor/Hailey - T.A.D.	Short
2012	Blackbird	Court Clerk	
2024	Sharp Corner	Mourning mother	

=== Television ===
Year	Title	Role	Notes
2001	A Town Without Christmas	Local Parent	TV movie
2003	Shattered City: The Halifax Explosion	Head Nurse	TV mini-series
2005	Ambulance Girl	Fan at Bus	TV movie
2008	The Memory Keeper's Daughter	Lee	TV movie
2013	Forgive Me	Marguerite-Corrine	TV series
2013	Haven	Haven Cop	TV series

== Electoral record ==
2024 Nova Scotia general election: Dartmouth North
Party	Candidate	Votes	%	±%
New Democratic	Susan Leblanc	3,698	62.92	+13.17
Progressive Conservative	Karina Sanford	1,353	23.02	+5.98
Liberal	Pam Cooley	826	14.05	-17.43
Total		5,877	–	
Total rejected ballots		34		
Turnout		5,912	36.36	
Eligible voters		16,261		
New Democratic hold		Swing		
Source: Elections Nova Scotia

2021 Nova Scotia general election: Dartmouth North
Party	Candidate	Votes	%	±%	Expenditures
New Democratic	Susan Leblanc	3,731	49.75	+10.39	$59,923.85
Liberal	Pam Cooley	2,361	31.48	-3.20	$47,442.64
Progressive Conservative	Lisa Coates	1,278	17.04	-2.62	$22,946.06
Green	Carolyn Marshall	129	1.72	-2.80	$200.00
Total valid votes/expense limit		7,499	99.42	–	$93,790.97
Total rejected ballots		44	0.58		
Turnout		7,543	46.02		
Eligible voters		16,392			
New Democratic hold		Swing		+6.80	
Source: Elections Nova Scotia

2017 Nova Scotia general election: Dartmouth North
Party	Candidate	Votes	%	±%
New Democratic	Susan Leblanc	2,771	39.36	+9.22
Liberal	Joanne Bernard	2,442	34.68	-9.38
Progressive Conservative	Melanie Russell	1,384	19.66	-5.42
Green	Tyler Colburne	318	4.52	
Atlantica	David Boyd	126	1.79	
Total valid votes		7,041	100	
Total rejected ballots		33	0.47	
Turnout		7,074	42.7	
Eligible voters		16,566		
New Democratic gain from Liberal		Swing		+9.30
Source: Elections Nova Scotia
