= Guy Brown (politician) =

Canadian politician

MLA for Cumberland South
- In office 1993–1998
- Preceded by: new riding
- Succeeded by: Murray Scott

MLA for Cumberland Centre
- In office 1974–1993
- Preceded by: Raymond M. Smith
- Succeeded by: riding dissolved

Personal details
- Born: August 24, 1936 Springhill, Nova Scotia
- Died: April 5, 2009 (aged 72) Moncton, New Brunswick
- Party: Liberal

Guy A. C. Brown (August 24, 1936 – April 5, 2009) was a politician in Nova Scotia, Canada. He represented Cumberland Centre, and then Cumberland South in the Nova Scotia House of Assembly, from 1974 to 1998.

He was born in Springhill, Nova Scotia in 1936, and served in the Canadian Army from 1956 to 1962. Brown served in the Executive Council of Nova Scotia as Minister of Consumer Affairs from 1976 to 1978, and Minister of Housing and Consumer Affairs from 1993 to 1996. Brown was mayor of Springhill from 2004 to 2008.

Brown died at the age of 72 on April 5, 2009, in Moncton, New Brunswick, after a lengthy illness.
