= George Riley (Nova Scotia politician) =

Canadian politician

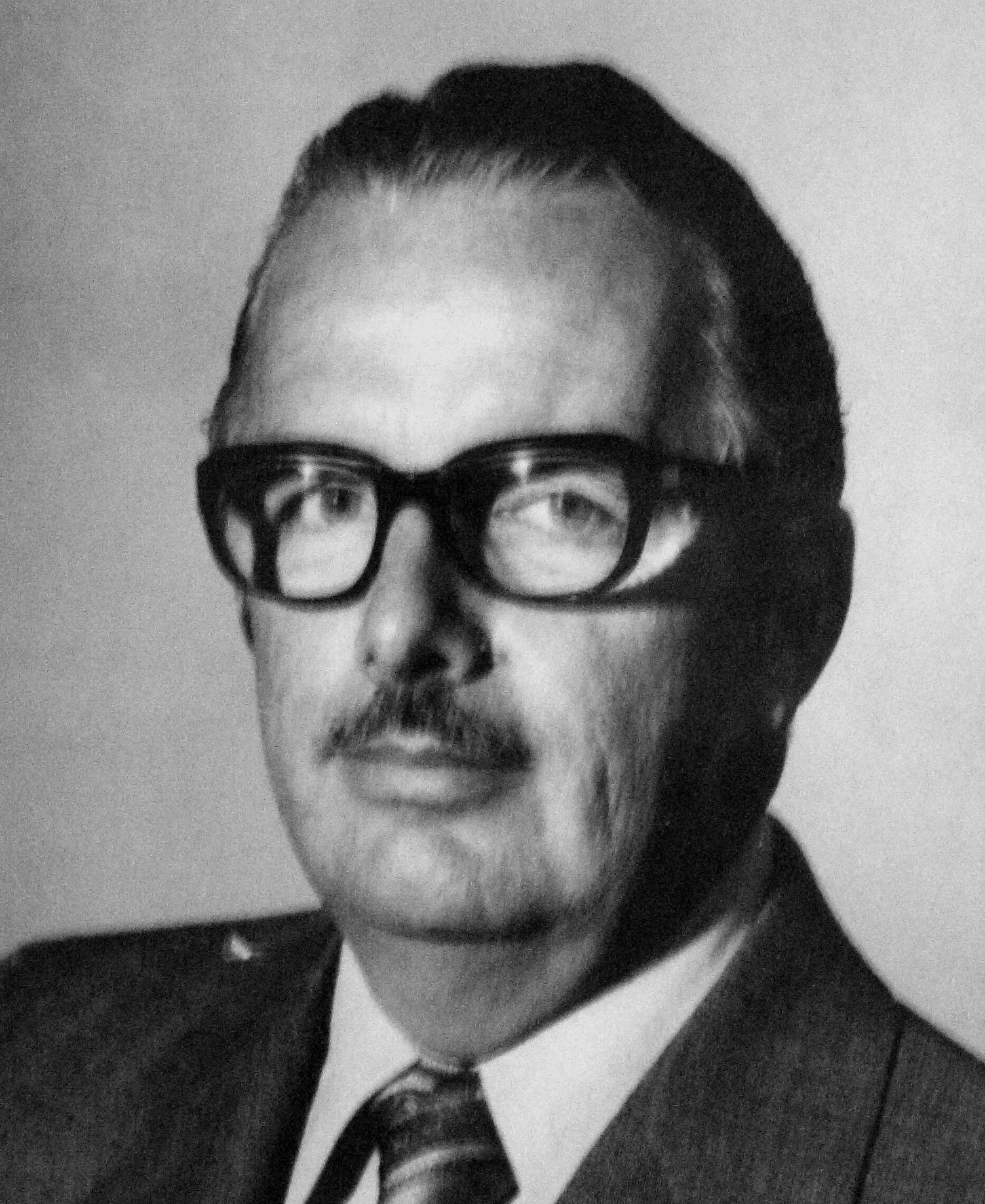

MLA for Halifax Cobequid
- In office 1970–1974
- Preceded by: Gordon H. Fitzgerald
- Succeeded by: George Doucet

Personal details
- Born: November 18, 1922 Vancouver, British Columbia
- Died: August 28, 2002 (aged 79) Halifax, Nova Scotia
- Party: Nova Scotia Liberal Party
- Occupation: Businessman

George Stuart Riley (November 18, 1922 – August 28, 2002) was a Canadian politician. He represented the electoral district of Halifax Cobequid in the Nova Scotia House of Assembly from 1970 to 1974. He was a member of the Nova Scotia Liberal Party.

Riley was born in Vancouver, British Columbia. A businessman, he attended Daniel Mclntyre Collegiate and the University of Manitoba in Winnipeg. In 1944, he married Margaret Jane Abraham.

Riley entered provincial politics in the 1970 election, defeating Progressive Conservative incumbent Gordon H. Fitzgerald by over 1000 votes in Halifax Cobequid. On November 24, 1971, Riley was appointed to the Executive Council of Nova Scotia as Minister of Public Works. He resigned from cabinet on May 16, 1972. Riley died on August 28, 2002, at QEII Health Sciences Centre in Halifax.
