= Glen M. Bagnell =

Canadian politician

The Honourable Glen M. Bagnell ECNS
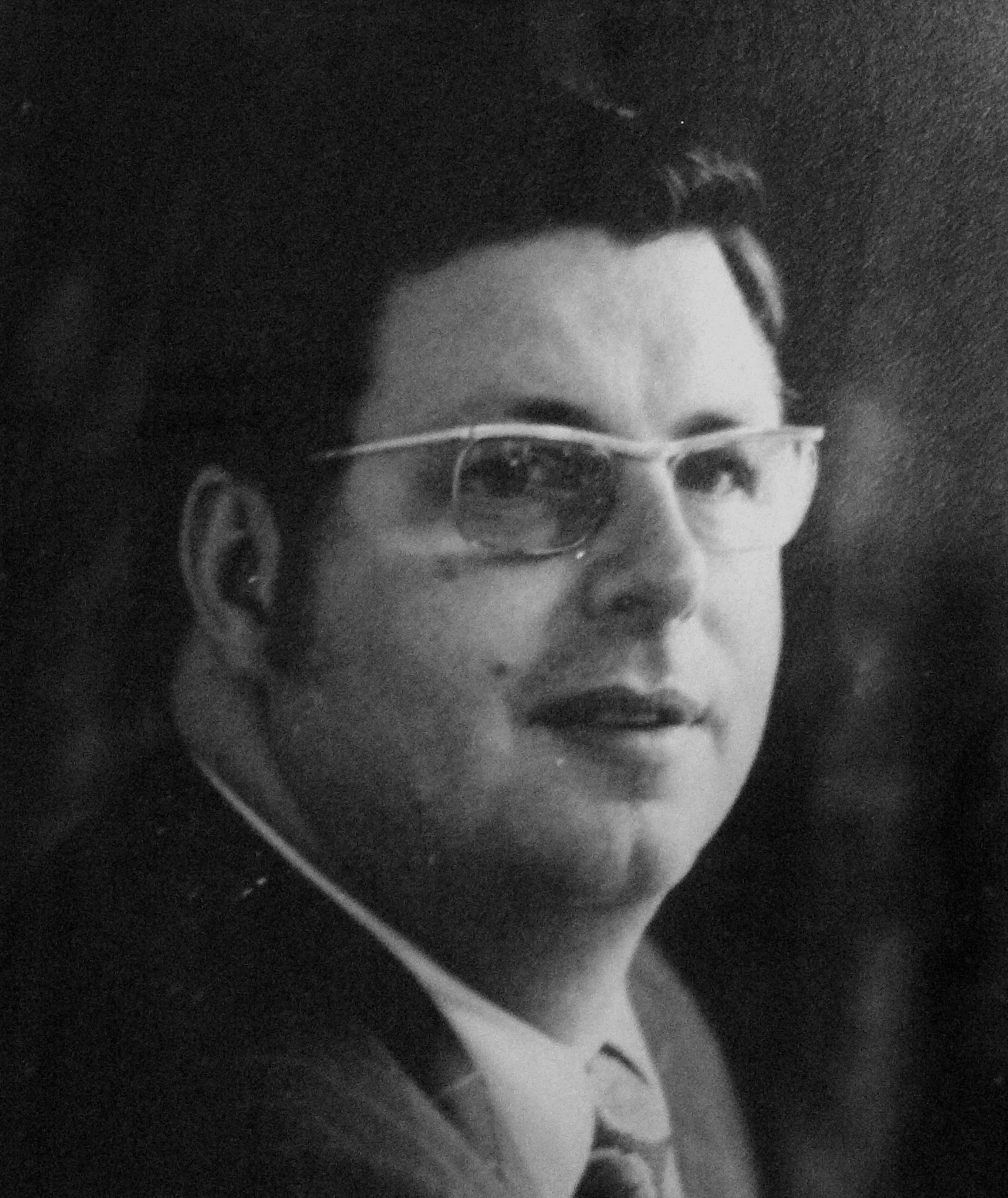
- Bagnell, c. 1973

MLA for Dartmouth North
- In office 1970–1978
- Preceded by: Gerald G. Wambolt
- Succeeded by: Laird Stirling

Personal details
- Born: February 15, 1936 (age 90) Truro, Nova Scotia, Canada
- Party: Nova Scotia Liberal Party
- Occupation: Pharmacist

Glen Merlyn Bagnell (born February 15, 1936) is a Canadian politician. He represented the electoral district of Dartmouth North in the Nova Scotia House of Assembly from 1970 to 1978. He is a member of the Nova Scotia Liberal Party.

Bagnell was born in Truro, Nova Scotia. He attended Acadia University and Dalhousie University and was a pharmacist. He married Shirley Joan Smith in 1957.

Bagnell first attempted to enter provincial politics in a November 1968 by-election in Dartmouth North, but was defeated by Progressive Conservative Gerald Wambolt by 76 votes. He ran again in the 1970 election, and defeated Wambolt by almost 1,800 votes. Bagnell was re-elected in the 1974 election. Bagnell served in the Executive Council of Nova Scotia as Minister of Mines, Minister of Environment, Minister of Tourism, Minister of Consumer Affairs, and Minister of Municipal Affairs. He was defeated by Progressive Conservative Laird Stirling when he ran for re-election in the 1978 election.
