= Annapolis West =

Former provincial electoral district in Nova Scotia, Canada

Nova Scotia electoral district

Defunct provincial electoral district
- Legislature: Nova Scotia House of Assembly
- District created: 1956
- District abolished: 1993
- Last contested: 1988

Annapolis West was a provincial electoral district in Nova Scotia, Canada, that elected one member of the Nova Scotia House of Assembly. It existed from 1956 to 1993. Prior to 1956, it was a part of the district of Annapolis County.

It was abolished when it was merged into Digby-Annapolis.

== Members of the Legislative Assembly ==
The electoral district was represented by the following members of the Legislative Assembly:

Annapolis West
Legislature	Years	Member	Party
Riding created from Annapolis County (1867–1953)
46th	1956–1960	Peter M. Nicholson	Liberal
47th	1960–1963	Peter M. Nicholson	Liberal
48th	1963–1967	Peter M. Nicholson	Liberal
49th	1967–1970	Peter M. Nicholson	Liberal
50th	1970–1974	Peter M. Nicholson	Liberal
51st	1974–1978	Peter M. Nicholson	Liberal
52nd	1978–1981	Greg Kerr	Progressive Conservative
53rd	1981–1984	Greg Kerr	Progressive Conservative
54th	1984–1988	Greg Kerr	Progressive Conservative
55th	1988–1993	Greg Kerr	Progressive Conservative
Riding dissolved into Digby-Annapolis (1993–2013)

== Election results ==
=== 1988 ===
1988 Nova Scotia general election
Party	Candidate	Votes	%	±%
Progressive Conservative	Greg Kerr	3,090	55.78%	2.10%
Liberal	Daurene Lewis	2,068	37.33%	-1.25%
New Democratic	Nancy Onysko	306	5.52%	-2.22%
Independent	Leo E. MacDonald	76	1.37%	–
Total		5,540	–	
Source(s) Source: Nova Scotia Legislature (2024). "Electoral History for Annapolis West" (PDF). nslegislature.ca. Nova Scotia, Chief Electoral Officer (1988). Returns of the General Election for the House of Assembly, Thirty-Second General Election (PDF) (Report). Queen's Printer. Archived from the original (PDF) on 7 July 2018.

=== 1984 ===
1984 Nova Scotia general election
Party	Candidate	Votes	%	±%
Progressive Conservative	Greg Kerr	2,809	53.68%	0.11%
Liberal	Herb Anderson	2,019	38.58%	2.14%
New Democratic	Howard Langille	405	7.74%	-2.25%
Total		5,233	–	
Source(s) Source: Nova Scotia Legislature (2024). "Electoral History for Annapolis West" (PDF). nslegislature.ca. Nova Scotia, Chief Electoral Officer (1984). Returns of the General Election for the House of Assembly, Thirty-First General Election (PDF) (Report). Queen's Printer. Archived from the original (PDF) on 31 July 2017.

=== 1981 ===
1981 Nova Scotia general election
Party	Candidate	Votes	%	±%
Progressive Conservative	Greg Kerr	2,784	53.57%	3.01%
Liberal	Herb Anderson	1,894	36.44%	-7.33%
New Democratic	John R. Taylor	519	9.99%	4.33%
Total		5,197	–	
Source(s) Source: Nova Scotia Legislature (2024). "Electoral History for Annapolis West" (PDF). nslegislature.ca. Nova Scotia, Chief Electoral Officer (1981). Returns of the General Election for the House of Assembly, Thirtieth General Election (PDF) (Report). Queen's Printer. Archived from the original (PDF) on 31 July 2017.

=== 1978 ===
1978 Nova Scotia general election
Party	Candidate	Votes	%	±%
Progressive Conservative	Greg Kerr	2,690	50.56%	7.34%
Liberal	Peter M. Nicholson	2,329	43.78%	-9.22%
New Democratic	Larry Duchesne	301	5.66%	1.88%
Total		5,320	–	
Source(s) Source: Nova Scotia Legislature (2024). "Electoral History for Annapolis West" (PDF). nslegislature.ca. Nova Scotia, Chief Electoral Officer (1978). Returns of the General Election for the House of Assembly, Twenty-Ninth General Election (PDF) (Report). Queen's Printer. Archived from the original (PDF) on 18 June 2018.

=== 1974 ===
1974 Nova Scotia general election
Party	Candidate	Votes	%	±%
Liberal	Peter M. Nicholson	2,636	53.00%	-0.97%
Progressive Conservative	Greg Kerr	2,150	43.22%	-2.81%
New Democratic	David N. Lowe	188	3.78%	–
Total		4,974	–	
Source(s) Source: Nova Scotia Legislature (2024). "Electoral History for Annapolis West" (PDF). nslegislature.ca. Nova Scotia, Chief Electoral Officer (1974). Returns of the General Election for the House of Assembly, Twenty-Eighth General Election (PDF) (Report). Queen's Printer. Archived from the original (PDF) on 18 June 2018.

=== 1970 ===
1970 Nova Scotia general election
Party	Candidate	Votes	%	±%
Liberal	Peter M. Nicholson	2,401	53.97%	-0.17%
Progressive Conservative	H. Robert Sanford	2,048	46.03%	0.17%
Total		4,449	–	
Source(s) Source: Nova Scotia Legislature (2024). "Electoral History for Annapolis West" (PDF). nslegislature.ca. Nova Scotia, Legislative Assembly (1970). Returns of the General Election for the House of Assembly, 1970 (PDF) (Report). Queen's Printer. Archived from the original (PDF) on 25 July 2018.

=== 1967 ===
1967 Nova Scotia general election
Party	Candidate	Votes	%	±%
Liberal	Peter M. Nicholson	2,338	54.13%	1.46%
Progressive Conservative	Kenneth E. Green	1,981	45.87%	0.06%
Total		4,319	–	
Source(s) Source: Nova Scotia Legislature (2024). "Electoral History for Annapolis West" (PDF). nslegislature.ca. Nova Scotia Legislature (1967). Returns of the General Election for the House of Assembly (PDF) (Report). Queen's Printer. Archived from the original (PDF) on 25 July 2018.

=== 1963 ===
1963 Nova Scotia general election
Party	Candidate	Votes	%	±%
Liberal	Peter M. Nicholson	2,386	52.67%	-0.47%
Progressive Conservative	Kenneth E. Green	2,075	45.81%	3.06%
New Democratic	Dale A. Young	69	1.52%	-2.59%
Total		4,530	–	
Source(s) Source: Nova Scotia Legislature (2024). "Electoral History for Annapolis West" (PDF). nslegislature.ca. Nova Scotia Legislature (1963). Returns of the General Election for the House of Assembly (PDF) (Report). Queen's Printer. Archived from the original (PDF) on 25 July 2018.

=== 1960 ===
1960 Nova Scotia general election
Party	Candidate	Votes	%	±%
Liberal	Peter M. Nicholson	2,571	53.14%	-0.70%
Progressive Conservative	Charles T. LeBrun	2,068	42.74%	-3.41%
Co-operative Commonwealth	Louis A. Beeler	199	4.11%	–
Total		4,838	–	
Source(s) Source: Nova Scotia Legislature (2024). "Electoral History for Annapolis West" (PDF). nslegislature.ca. Nova Scotia Legislature (1960). Returns of the General Election for the House of Assembly (PDF) (Report). Queen's Printer. Archived from the original (PDF) on 25 July 2018.

=== 1956 ===
1956 Nova Scotia general election
Party	Candidate	Votes	%	±%
Liberal	Peter M. Nicholson	2,523	53.84%	–
Progressive Conservative	Leigh Minard Marshall	2,163	46.16%	–
Total		4,686	–	
Source(s) Source: Nova Scotia Legislature (2024). "Electoral History for Annapolis West" (PDF). nslegislature.ca. Nova Scotia Legislature (1956). Returns of the General Election for the House of Assembly (PDF) (Report). Queen's Printer. Archived from the original (PDF) on 10 September 2018.

== See also ==
- List of Nova Scotia provincial electoral districts
- Canadian provincial electoral districts
