= Halifax Cobequid =

Former provincial electoral district in Nova Scotia, Canada

Nova Scotia electoral district

Defunct provincial electoral district
- Legislature: Nova Scotia House of Assembly
- District created: 1956
- District abolished: 1978
- Last contested: 1974

Halifax Cobequid was a provincial electoral district in Nova Scotia, Canada, that elected one member of the Nova Scotia House of Assembly. It was formed in 1956 as Halifax Northwest from part of the former district of Halifax West. In 1966, the district was renamed Halifax County North West, and the following year, in 1967 it was renamed Halifax Cobequid. It existed until 1978, when it was redistributed into four new districts: Sackville, Halifax Bedford Basin, Bedford-Musquodoboit Valley, and Cole Harbour.

== Members of the Legislative Assembly ==
The electoral district was represented by the following members of the Legislative Assembly:

Halifax Northwest
Legislature	Years	Member	Party
District formed from Halifax West (1933–1967)
46th	1956–1960	Ronald Manning Fielding	Liberal
47th	1960–1963	Gordon H. Fitzgerald	Progressive Conservative
48th	1963–1967	Gordon H. Fitzgerald	Progressive Conservative
District renamed Halifax Cobequid
49th	1967–1970	Gordon H. Fitzgerald	Progressive Conservative
50th	1970–1974	George Riley	Liberal
51st	1974–1978	George Doucet	Liberal
District distributed into Sackville, Halifax Bedford Basin, Bedford-Musquodoboit Valley, and Cole Harbour

== Election results ==
=== 1974 ===
1974 Nova Scotia general election
Party	Candidate	Votes	%	±%
Liberal	George Doucet	8,691	49.57%	-1.19%
Progressive Conservative	Silvia Hudson	6,878	39.23%	-3.46%
New Democratic	George Clement Cann	1,964	11.20%	4.65%
Total		17,533	–	
Source(s) Source: Nova Scotia Legislature (2024). "Electoral History for Halifax Cobequid" (PDF). nslegislature.ca. Nova Scotia, Chief Electoral Officer (1974). Returns of the General Election for the House of Assembly, Twenty-Eighth General Election (PDF) (Report). Queen's Printer. Archived from the original (PDF) on 18 June 2018.

=== 1970 ===
1970 Nova Scotia general election
Party	Candidate	Votes	%	±%
Liberal	George Riley	6,453	50.76%	2.27%
Progressive Conservative	Gordon H. Fitzgerald	5,427	42.69%	-8.82%
New Democratic	Bruno Dombrowski	833	6.55%	–
Total		12,713	–	
Source(s) Source: Nova Scotia Legislature (2024). "Electoral History for Halifax Cobequid" (PDF). nslegislature.ca. Nova Scotia, Legislative Assembly (1970). Returns of the General Election for the House of Assembly, 1970 (PDF) (Report). Queen's Printer. Archived from the original (PDF) on 25 July 2018.

=== 1967 ===
1967 Nova Scotia general election
Party	Candidate	Votes	%	±%
Progressive Conservative	Gordon H. Fitzgerald	5,463	51.51%	-4.56%
Liberal	John F. Cruickshank	5,143	48.49%	7.88%
Total		10,606	–	
Source(s) Source: Nova Scotia Legislature (2024). "Electoral History for Halifax Cobequid" (PDF). nslegislature.ca. Nova Scotia Legislature (1967). Returns of the General Election for the House of Assembly (PDF) (Report). Queen's Printer. Archived from the original (PDF) on 25 July 2018.

=== 1963 ===
1963 Nova Scotia general election: Halifax Northwest
Party	Candidate	Votes	%	±%
Progressive Conservative	Gordon H. Fitzgerald	5,559	56.07%	9.51%
Liberal	George Douglas Burris	4,027	40.62%	-5.64%
New Democratic	Gerald A. Guptil	329	3.32%	–
Total		9,915	–	
Source(s) Source: Nova Scotia Legislature (2024). "Electoral History for Halifax Northwest" (PDF). nslegislature.ca. Nova Scotia Legislature (1963). Returns of the General Election for the House of Assembly (PDF) (Report). Queen's Printer. Archived from the original (PDF) on 25 July 2018.

=== 1960 ===
1960 Nova Scotia general election: Halifax Northwest
Party	Candidate	Votes	%	±%
Progressive Conservative	Gordon H. Fitzgerald	4,209	46.55%	-1.30%
Liberal	Ronald Manning Fielding	4,182	46.26%	-4.15%
Co-operative Commonwealth	Lloyd Carman Wilson	650	7.19%	5.45%
Total		9,041	–	
Source(s) Source: Nova Scotia Legislature (2024). "Electoral History for Halifax Northwest" (PDF). nslegislature.ca. Nova Scotia Legislature (1960). Returns of the General Election for the House of Assembly (PDF) (Report). Queen's Printer. Archived from the original (PDF) on 25 July 2018.

=== 1956 ===
1956 Nova Scotia general election: Halifax Northwest
Party	Candidate	Votes	%	±%
Liberal	Ronald Manning Fielding	3,763	50.40%	–
Progressive Conservative	Samuel Earl Haverstock	3,573	47.86%	–
Co-operative Commonwealth	Lloyd Carman Wilson	130	1.74%	–
Total		7,466	–	
Source(s) Source: Nova Scotia Legislature (2024). "Electoral History for Halifax Northwest" (PDF). nslegislature.ca. Nova Scotia Legislature (1956). Returns of the General Election for the House of Assembly (PDF) (Report). Queen's Printer. Archived from the original (PDF) on 10 September 2018.

== See also ==
- List of Nova Scotia provincial electoral districts
- Canadian provincial electoral districts
