= Sandy Jolly =

Canadian politician

The Honourable Sandy Jolly ECNS

MLA for Dartmouth North
- In office September 6, 1988 – January 9, 1998
- Preceded by: Laird Stirling
- Succeeded by: Jerry Pye

Personal details
- Born: 1954 (age 71–72) Kentville, Nova Scotia, Canada
- Party: Liberal

Sandra L. "Sandy" Jolly (born 1954) is a former businessperson and politician in Nova Scotia, Canada. She represented Dartmouth North in the Nova Scotia House of Assembly from 1988 to 1998 as a Liberal member.

Jolly was born in Kentville, Nova Scotia and was educated at Kings County Academy and Mount Saint Vincent University. She entered provincial politics in the 1988 election, defeating Progressive Consertvative cabinet minister Laird Stirling by 121 votes in the Dartmouth North riding. Jolly was re-elected in the 1993 election, defeating New Democrat Jerry Pye by 423 votes.

On June 11, 1993, Jolly was appointed to the Executive Council of Nova Scotia as Minister of Municipal Affairs. In June 1996, she was moved to Minister of Business and Consumer Services. Jolly was left out of cabinet when Russell MacLellan took over as premier in July 1997, and resigned as MLA in January 1998.
