= Gordon H. Fitzgerald =

Canadian politician

Gordon Howard Fitzgerald

Speaker of the Nova Scotia House of Assembly
- In office 1969–1970
- Preceded by: Harvey Veniot
- Succeeded by: George M. Mitchell

MLA for Halifax Northwest
- In office 1960–1967
- Preceded by: Ronald Manning Fielding
- Succeeded by: riding abolished

MLA for Halifax Cobequid
- In office 1967–1970
- Preceded by: new riding
- Succeeded by: George Riley

Personal details
- Born: January 19, 1927 Cochrane, Ontario
- Died: May 1, 2014 (aged 87) Halifax, Nova Scotia
- Party: Progressive Conservative
- Occupation: Lawyer

Gordon Howard "Paddy" Fitzgerald (January 19, 1927 – May 1, 2014) was a Canadian politician in the province of Nova Scotia. He was a former Speaker of the Nova Scotia House of Assembly. Fitzgerald was born in Cochrane, Ontario.

== Political career ==
A lawyer by profession, Fitzgerald was first elected to the Nova Scotia House of Assembly in the 1960 provincial election representing Halifax Northwest for the Progressive Conservative and was re-elected in 1963. In 1967 he was elected in the new riding of Halifax Cobequid. In 1969, he was appointed Speaker and served until the 1970 provincial election in which the Conservative government was defeated and Fitzgerald lost his seat.

== Legal career ==
Following his defeat, Fitzgerald returned to his legal practice and was one of the province's top trial lawyers in the 1970s. In 1978, he was convicted for falsifying tax return forms, and was disbarred by the Nova Scotia Barristers Society for fraud. In 1980, he was convicted of raping a female client in his office and sentenced to five years imprisonment. He was paroled in 1981 after serving ten months of his sentence and was pardoned in 1992.

In 1982, Fitzgerald was awarded a five-month $15,000 contract by the Nova Scotia Liquor Commission to study proposed changes to the Liquor Control Act. The appointment was met with outrage by the Opposition in the House of Assembly and he resigned the appointment.

== Attempted political comeback ==
Fitzgerald attempted a political comeback in the 1993 provincial election and contested the Progressive Conservative nomination in Dartmouth South to run against Liberal leader John Savage. He won the nomination by a margin of 29 votes to 25 votes for his opponent, Dartmouth city councillor Colin May but Conservative Premier Donald Cameron refused to sign Fitzgerald's nomination papers due to Fitzgerald's rape conviction. May was awarded the nomination instead.

== Death ==
Fitzgerald died on May 1, 2014, at a hospital in Halifax, Nova Scotia, aged 87.
