= Dartmouth North =

Provincial electoral district in Nova Scotia, Canada

Nova Scotia electoral district

Provincial electoral district
- Legislature: Nova Scotia House of Assembly
MLA
Susan Leblanc
New Democratic
- District created: 1967
- First contested: 1967
- Last contested: 2024

Demographics
- Population (2016): 19,833
- Electors: 15,512
- Area (km²): 31.00
- Pop. density (per km²): 639.8
- Census division: Halifax Regional Municipality

Dartmouth North is a provincial electoral district in Dartmouth, Nova Scotia, Canada, that elects one member of the Nova Scotia House of Assembly.

The district was created, under the name Dartmouth City North, in 1966 when Halifax County Dartmouth was divided into two electoral districts. In 1967, the district was renamed Dartmouth North. In 2003, the district gained the area on its southern boundary along Lake Banook from Dartmouth South.

== Geography ==
The electoral district of Dartmouth North is about 31 km^{2} (12 sq mi) in landmass.

== Members of the Legislative Assembly ==
This riding has elected the following members of the Legislative Assembly:

Dartmouth North
Legislature	Years	Member	Party
Riding created from Halifax County Dartmouth
49th	1967–1968	Gordon L. S. Hart	Liberal
49th	1968–1970	Gerald Wambolt	Progressive Conservative
50th	1970–1974	Glen M. Bagnell	Liberal
51st	1974–1978	Glen M. Bagnell	Liberal
52nd	1978–1981	Laird Stirling	Progressive Conservative
53rd	1981–1984	Laird Stirling	Progressive Conservative
54th	1984–1988	Laird Stirling	Progressive Conservative
55th	1988–1993	Sandy Jolly	Liberal
56th	1993–1998	Sandy Jolly	Liberal
57th	1998–1999	Jerry Pye	New Democratic
58th	1999–2003	Jerry Pye	New Democratic
59th	2003–2006	Jerry Pye	New Democratic
60th	2006–2009	Trevor Zinck	New Democratic
61st	2009–2010	Trevor Zinck	New Democratic
61st	2010–2013	Trevor Zinck	Independent
62nd	2013–2017	Joanne Bernard	Liberal
63rd	2017–2021	Susan Leblanc	New Democratic
64th	2021–2024	Susan Leblanc	New Democratic
65th	2024–present	Susan Leblanc	New Democratic

== Election results ==
=== 2024 ===
2024 Nova Scotia general election
Party	Candidate	Votes	%	±%
New Democratic	Susan Leblanc	3,698	62.92	+13.17
Progressive Conservative	Karina Sanford	1,353	23.02	+5.98
Liberal	Pam Cooley	826	14.05	-17.43
Total		5,877	–	
Total rejected ballots		34		
Turnout		5,912	36.36	
Eligible voters		16,261		
New Democratic hold		Swing		
Source: Elections Nova Scotia

=== 2021 ===
2021 Nova Scotia general election
Party	Candidate	Votes	%	±%	Expenditures
New Democratic	Susan Leblanc	3,731	49.75	+10.39	$59,923.85
Liberal	Pam Cooley	2,361	31.48	-3.20	$47,442.64
Progressive Conservative	Lisa Coates	1,278	17.04	-2.62	$22,946.06
Green	Carolyn Marshall	129	1.72	-2.80	$200.00
Total valid votes/expense limit		7,499	99.42	–	$93,790.97
Total rejected ballots		44	0.58		
Turnout		7,543	46.02		
Eligible voters		16,392			
New Democratic hold		Swing		+6.80	
Source: Elections Nova Scotia

=== 2017 ===
2017 Nova Scotia general election
Party	Candidate	Votes	%	±%
New Democratic	Susan Leblanc	2,771	39.36	+9.22
Liberal	Joanne Bernard	2,442	34.68	-9.38
Progressive Conservative	Melanie Russell	1,384	19.66	-5.42
Green	Tyler Colburne	318	4.52	
Atlantica	David Boyd	126	1.79	
Total valid votes		7,041	100	
Total rejected ballots		33	0.47	
Turnout		7,074	42.7	
Eligible voters		16,566		
New Democratic gain from Liberal		Swing		+9.30
Source: Elections Nova Scotia

=== 2013 ===
2013 Nova Scotia general election
Party	Candidate	Votes	%	±%
Liberal	Joanne Bernard	2,953	44.06%	11.63%
New Democratic	Steve Estey	2,020	30.14%	-26.61%
Progressive Conservative	Séan G. Brownlow	1,729	25.80%	17.85%
Total		6,702	–	
Source(s) Source: Nova Scotia Legislature (2024). "Electoral History for Dartmouth North" (PDF). nslegislature.ca. Nova Scotia, Chief Electoral Officer (2013). 39th Provincial General Election, October 8, 2013: Volume 1 – Statement of Votes & Statistics (PDF) (Report). Elections Nova Scotia. Archived from the original (PDF) on 10 April 2018.

=== 2009 ===
2009 Nova Scotia general election
Party	Candidate	Votes	%	±%
New Democratic	Trevor Zinck	4,053	56.75%	7.50%
Liberal	Jim Smith	2,316	32.43%	12.56%
Progressive Conservative	David Losey	568	7.95%	-19.63%
Green	Alex Donaldson	205	2.87%	-0.43%
Total		7,142	–	
Source(s) Source: Nova Scotia Legislature (2024). "Electoral History for Dartmouth North" (PDF). nslegislature.ca.

=== 2006 ===
2006 Nova Scotia general election
Party	Candidate	Votes	%	±%
New Democratic	Trevor Zinck	3,384	49.25%	-3.81%
Progressive Conservative	Troy Myers	1,895	27.58%	1.04%
Liberal	Ian Murray	1,365	19.87%	1.71%
Green	Alex Donaldson	227	3.30%	–
Total		6,871	–	
Source(s) Source: Nova Scotia Legislature (2024). "Electoral History for Dartmouth North" (PDF). nslegislature.ca.

=== 2003 ===
2003 Nova Scotia general election
Party	Candidate	Votes	%	±%
New Democratic	Jerry Pye	3,799	53.06%	9.05%
Progressive Conservative	Jane MacKay	1,900	26.54%	-2.66%
Liberal	Rosemary Godin	1,300	18.16%	-6.59%
Nova Scotia Party	Pat Gould	86	1.20%	-0.85%
Marijuana	Marc-Andre Roy	75	1.05%	–
Total		7,160	–	
Source(s) Source: Nova Scotia Legislature (2024). "Electoral History for Dartmouth North" (PDF). nslegislature.ca.

=== 1999 ===
1999 Nova Scotia general election
Party	Candidate	Votes	%	±%
New Democratic	Jerry Pye	3,105	44.01%	4.23%
Progressive Conservative	Jane MacKay	2,060	29.20%	2.85%
Liberal	Frank Cameron	1,746	24.74%	-9.13%
Nova Scotia Party	Susan Livingstone	145	2.05%	–
Total		7,056	–	
Source(s) Source: Nova Scotia Legislature (2024). "Electoral History for Dartmouth North" (PDF). nslegislature.ca. Nova Scotia, Chief Electoral Officer (1999). Returns of the General Election for the House of Assembly, Thirty-Fifth General Election (Report). Elections Nova Scotia.

=== 1998 ===
1998 Nova Scotia general election
Party	Candidate	Votes	%	±%
New Democratic	Jerry Pye	3,024	39.78%	6.25%
Liberal	Gloria McCluskey	2,575	33.87%	-4.59%
Progressive Conservative	Mike Brownlow	2,003	26.35%	-0.76%
Total		7,602	–	
Source(s) Source: Nova Scotia Legislature (2024). "Electoral History for Dartmouth North" (PDF). nslegislature.ca.

=== 1993 ===
1993 Nova Scotia general election
Party	Candidate	Votes	%	±%
Liberal	Sandy Jolly	3,301	38.46%	-4.67%
New Democratic	Jerry Pye	2,878	33.53%	18.31%
Progressive Conservative	Mike Brownlow	2,327	27.11%	-14.53%
Natural Law	Monique Poudrette	77	0.90%	–
Total		8,583	–	
Source(s) Source: Nova Scotia Legislature (2024). "Electoral History for Dartmouth North" (PDF). nslegislature.ca. Nova Scotia, Chief Electoral Officer (1993). Returns of the General Election for the House of Assembly, Thirty-Third General Election (PDF) (Report). Queen's Printer. Archived from the original (PDF) on 18 June 2018.

=== 1988 ===
1988 Nova Scotia general election
Party	Candidate	Votes	%	±%
Liberal	Sandy Jolly	3,510	43.13%	13.93%
Progressive Conservative	Laird Stirling	3,389	41.64%	-1.81%
New Democratic	Brenda Thompson	1,239	15.22%	-11.09%
Total		8,138	–	
Source(s) Source: Nova Scotia Legislature (2024). "Electoral History for Dartmouth North" (PDF). nslegislature.ca. Nova Scotia, Chief Electoral Officer (1988). Returns of the General Election for the House of Assembly, Thirty-Second General Election (PDF) (Report). Queen's Printer. Archived from the original (PDF) on 7 July 2018.

=== 1984 ===
1984 Nova Scotia general election
Party	Candidate	Votes	%	±%
Progressive Conservative	Laird Stirling	3,200	43.45%	-2.72%
Liberal	Pat Connolly	2,150	29.20%	0.74%
New Democratic	Chester Sanford	1,938	26.32%	0.94%
Labour	Ron Bugbee	76	1.03%	–
Total		7,364	–	
Source(s) Source: Nova Scotia Legislature (2024). "Electoral History for Dartmouth North" (PDF). nslegislature.ca. Nova Scotia, Chief Electoral Officer (1984). Returns of the General Election for the House of Assembly, Thirty-First General Election (PDF) (Report). Queen's Printer. Archived from the original (PDF) on 31 July 2017.

=== 1981 ===
1981 Nova Scotia general election
Party	Candidate	Votes	%	±%
Progressive Conservative	Laird Stirling	3,925	46.17%	-6.72%
Liberal	Don Valardo	2,419	28.46%	-5.49%
New Democratic	Mark Flannigan	2,157	25.37%	12.21%
Total		8,501	–	
Source(s) Source: Nova Scotia Legislature (2024). "Electoral History for Dartmouth North" (PDF). nslegislature.ca. Nova Scotia, Chief Electoral Officer (1981). Returns of the General Election for the House of Assembly, Thirtieth General Election (PDF) (Report). Queen's Printer. Archived from the original (PDF) on 31 July 2017.

=== 1978 ===
1978 Nova Scotia general election
Party	Candidate	Votes	%	±%
Progressive Conservative	Laird Stirling	4,561	52.89%	17.81%
Liberal	Glen M. Bagnell	2,927	33.94%	-17.47%
New Democratic	Nick Rolls	1,135	13.16%	-0.34%
Total		8,623	–	
Source(s) Source: Nova Scotia Legislature (2024). "Electoral History for Dartmouth North" (PDF). nslegislature.ca. Nova Scotia, Chief Electoral Officer (1978). Returns of the General Election for the House of Assembly, Twenty-Ninth General Election (PDF) (Report). Queen's Printer. Archived from the original (PDF) on 18 June 2018.

=== 1974 ===
1974 Nova Scotia general election
Party	Candidate	Votes	%	±%
Liberal	Glen M. Bagnell	7,091	51.41%	-2.85%
Progressive Conservative	Richard L. Weldon	4,839	35.08%	-4.51%
New Democratic	Joseph Bouchard	1,863	13.51%	7.35%
Total		13,793	–	
Source(s) Source: Nova Scotia Legislature (2024). "Electoral History for Dartmouth North" (PDF). nslegislature.ca. Nova Scotia, Chief Electoral Officer (1974). Returns of the General Election for the House of Assembly, Twenty-Eighth General Election (PDF) (Report). Queen's Printer. Archived from the original (PDF) on 18 June 2018.

=== 1970 ===
1970 Nova Scotia general election
Party	Candidate	Votes	%	±%
Liberal	Glen M. Bagnell	6,614	54.26%	4.93%
Progressive Conservative	Gerald G. Wambolt	4,826	39.59%	-11.09%
New Democratic	Percy W. Dares	750	6.15%	–
Total		12,190	–	
Source(s) Source: Nova Scotia Legislature (2024). "Electoral History for Dartmouth North" (PDF). nslegislature.ca. Nova Scotia, Legislative Assembly (1970). Returns of the General Election for the House of Assembly, 1970 (PDF) (Report). Queen's Printer. Archived from the original (PDF) on 25 July 2018.

=== 1968 by-election ===
Nova Scotia provincial by-election, 1968-11-26
Party	Candidate	Votes	%	±%
Progressive Conservative	Gerald G. Wambolt	2,853	50.67%	7.06%
Liberal	Glen M. Bagnell	2,777	49.33%	-0.43%
Total		5,630	–	
Source(s) Source: Nova Scotia Legislature (2024). "Electoral History for Dartmouth North" (PDF). nslegislature.ca.

=== 1967 ===
1967 Nova Scotia general election
Party	Candidate	Votes	%	±%
Liberal	Gordon L. S. Hart	4,906	49.75%	–
Progressive Conservative	Charles Clarke	4,301	43.62%	–
New Democratic	Perry Ronayne	654	6.63%	–
Total		9,861	–	
Source(s) Source: Nova Scotia Legislature (2024). "Electoral History for Dartmouth North" (PDF). nslegislature.ca. Nova Scotia Legislature (1967). Returns of the General Election for the House of Assembly (PDF) (Report). Queen's Printer. Archived from the original (PDF) on 25 July 2018.

== See also ==
- List of Nova Scotia provincial electoral districts
- Canadian provincial electoral districts
