= Roger Stuart Bacon =

Canadian politician (1926–2021)

The Honourable Roger Stuart Bacon ECNS
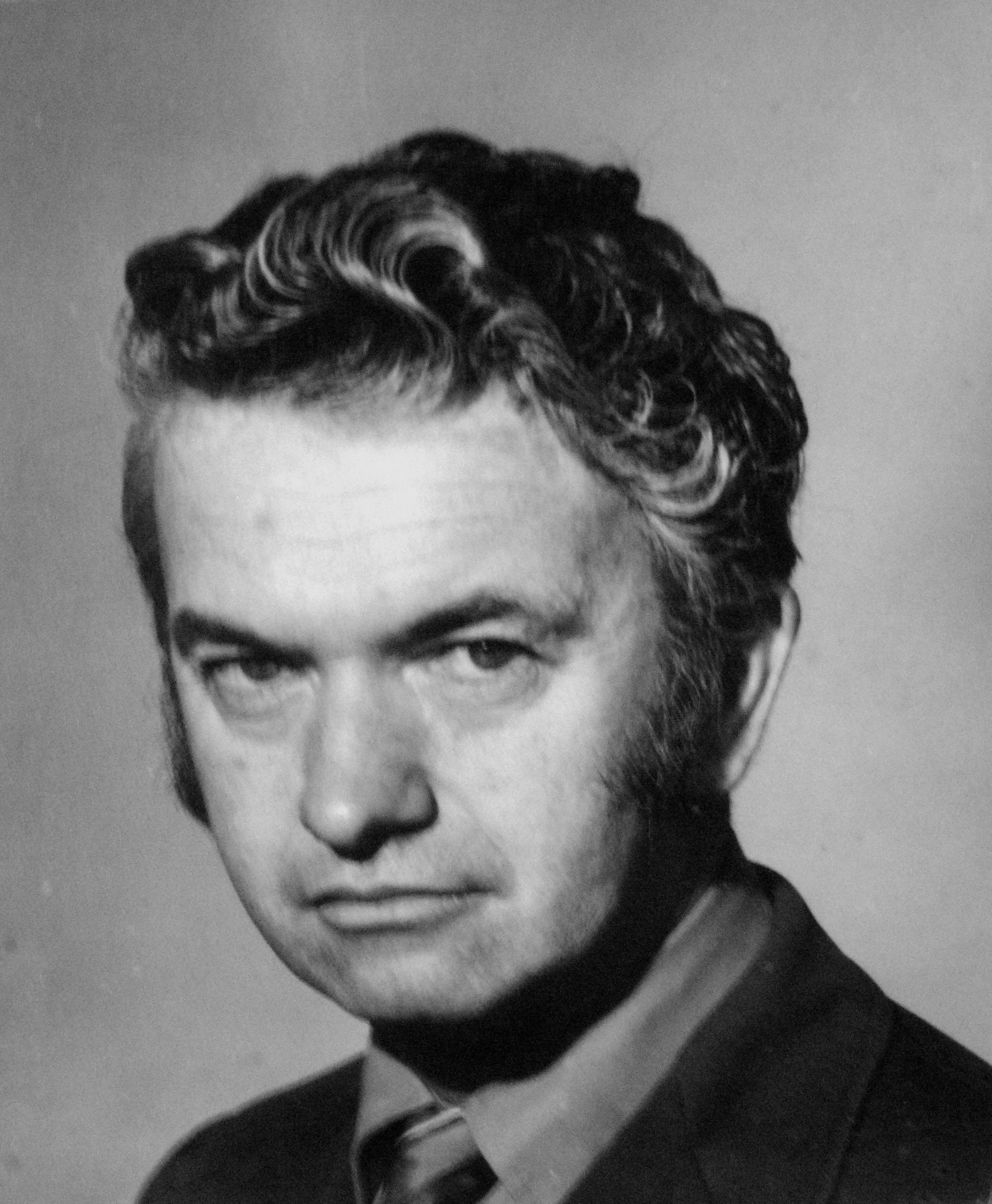
- Bacon, c. 1973

21st Premier of Nova Scotia
- In office September 12, 1990 – February 26, 1991
- Monarch: Elizabeth II
- Lieutenant Governor: Lloyd Crouse
- Preceded by: John Buchanan
- Succeeded by: Donald W. Cameron

MLA for Cumberland East
- In office October 13, 1970 – May 25, 1993
- Preceded by: James A. Langille
- Succeeded by: riding dissolved

Personal details
- Born: June 29, 1926 Upper Nappan, Nova Scotia, Canada
- Died: October 4, 2021 (aged 95) Amherst, Nova Scotia, Canada
- Party: Progressive Conservative
- Spouse: Clara Hawthorne (d. 2013)

Roger Stuart Bacon (June 29, 1926 – October 4, 2021) was a Canadian politician who served as the 21st premier of Nova Scotia from 1990 to 1991.

== Political career ==
He was first elected to the Nova Scotia House of Assembly in 1970 as a Progressive Conservative. When his party won the 1978 election, Bacon was Minister of Tourism before becoming Minister of Agriculture in the cabinet of Premier John Buchanan from 1979 to 1988.

Bacon then became Deputy Premier and Minister of Housing until 1990, when he succeeded Buchanan (who had been appointed to the Canadian Senate) to become interim leader of the party and premier of the province for six months until the party chose Donald W. Cameron as its new leader. He did not run for re-election in 1993.

A book discussing the life and career of Bacon, titled Me and My Team: From Farmer to Premier, was written by the retired lawyer Morris Haugg and published in 2019.

== Personal life ==
Born in Upper Nappan, Nova Scotia in June 1926, Bacon was a dairy farmer and pioneer of the blueberry industry. Bacon died on October 4, 2021, at the age of 95.
