= Gerald G. Wambolt =

Canadian politician

MLA for Dartmouth North
- In office 1968–1970
- Preceded by: Gordon L. S. Hart
- Succeeded by: Glen M. Bagnell

Personal details
- Born: May 12, 1923 Halifax, Nova Scotia
- Died: June 14, 2001 (aged 78) Dartmouth, Nova Scotia
- Party: Progressive Conservative
- Occupation: Accountant

Gerald Graham Wambolt (May 12, 1923 – June 14, 2001) was a Canadian politician. He represented the electoral district of Dartmouth North in the Nova Scotia House of Assembly from 1968 to 1970. He was a member of the Progressive Conservative Party of Nova Scotia.

Born on May 12, 1923, in Halifax, Nova Scotia, he was a son of Howard Henry and Ella Sheppard Wambolt. An accountant by career, Wambolt served three years as alderman in Dartmouth, Nova Scotia. He entered provincial politics in 1968, defeating Liberal Glen M. Bagnell by 76 votes in a by-election for the Dartmouth North riding. Wambolt was defeated by Bagnell when he ran for re-election in the 1970 election. He died on June 14, 2001.
