= Trevor Zinck =

Canadian politician

Trevor John Zinck

MLA for Dartmouth North
- In office June 13, 2006 – June 19, 2013
- Preceded by: Jerry Pye
- Succeeded by: Joanne Bernard

Personal details
- Born: November 12, 1970 (age 55)
- Party: Independent (2010–2013); NDP (2006–2010)

Trevor John Zinck (born November 12, 1970) is a former Canadian politician. He served as the member of the Nova Scotia House of Assembly (MLA) for the riding of Dartmouth North as a New Democrat and also as an independent. He was first elected for the New Democratic Party (NDP) in the 2006 election, succeeding retiring NDP MLA Jerry Pye. He served as the Community Services critic for the NDP and was re-elected in the 2009 election.

In connection with the Nova Scotia parliamentary expenses scandal, Zinck pleaded guilty on June 17, 2013 to charges of fraud over $5,000 and breach of trust by a public officer, and resigned from the Nova Scotia legislature. He was sentenced to 4 months of imprisonment, followed by 1 year of probation.

== Early life and education ==
Zinck attended Sir John A. Macdonald High School.

Prior to entering politics, Zinck was the head of the Dartmouth District 9 Citizens' Association.

== Political career ==
=== Constituency expense issues ===
On March 25, 2010, Zinck was suspended from the Nova Scotia NDP caucus over "persistent" expense irregularities. In making the decision, caucus chair Vicki Conrad stated that the government caucus could no longer trust Zinck, telling reporters "We decided to suspend him because members feel we do not have the necessary trust in his conduct as a member of this caucus." The province's auditor general was subsequently called in to investigate the matter.

On February 14, 2011, it was announced that Zinck was among four people facing criminal charges in connection with the RCMP investigation into 2010s MLA expense scandal. Zinck was charged with fraud exceeding $5,000, breach of trust by a public officer, and two counts of theft over $5,000, after filing fraudulent expense claims totalling $10,060. Among the items was a cheque for $860 intended to sponsor a young hockey player from Zinck's riding, which Zinck subsequently filed an expense claim for. The boy's father testified during the trial that the family never received the money, though Zinck was nonetheless reimbursed for it. A substantial portion of the $10,060 was earmarked for the Boys and Girls Club of Dartmouth, though employees of the Boys and Girls Club testified that Zinck failed to give them the money he had claimed as expenses. The business manager of a non-profit woodworking shop, a man by the name of Gus Brushett, testified that Zinck had paid $660 to participate in a golf tournament in the summer of 2008 and subsequently filed an expense claim for $1,200 in April 2008, for which he was reimbursed. The Crown also introduced Zinck's bank records as evidence which showed a series of late-night withdrawals made from his personal and constituency accounts from automated teller machines inside Casino Nova Scotia in Halifax.

A preliminary hearing for Zinck had been postponed several times and a trial date was set for June 10, 2013. Zinck pleaded guilty on June 17, 2013, to charges of fraud over $5,000 and breach of trust by a public officer. With the guilty plea, the charges of theft over $5,000 were withdrawn. Zinck admitted in an agreed statement of facts that he filed expense claims totalling $10,060 in 2008 and 2009 for which the Speaker's Office reimbursed him, even though the items listed in his claims were never actually purchased.

Despite the guilty pleas and the criminal record, Zinck was reluctant to resign his seat in the legislature, saying "There are bigger crooks in politics."

Leaders of all three major parties, including Progressive Conservative leader Jamie Baillie and Opposition Leader Stephen McNeil, all called for his immediate resignation, saying that Premier Darrell Dexter should recall the house and put forward a motion to expel Zinck. "I think the fair thing is for if this is going to finish on August 7th for the court process to be completed and then for the House to deal with it if that's necessary," said Dexter.

Despite promises not to resign, Zinck resigned as an MLA on June 19, 2013. He made the decision after being informed by a reporter that his severance package, formally called a "transition allowance", would not be available to him should his exit from the legislature come via expulsion. Zinck promptly contacted legislative counsel to confirm that his transition allowance would be in jeopardy, and then immediately announced his resignation.

Two days later, on June 21, 2013, the Nova Scotia government announced that it was holding back Zinck's $51,000 transition allowance until it could ensure Zinck would pay back the money he owes, a move Zinck said was not fair when informed of it. Zinck stated upon his resignation that he didn't want to lose the transition allowance because a single mother employed at his constituency office would then be left with no income. However, Speaker of the Legislature Gordie Gosse said that the employee in question is paid from a separate fund administered by Gosse's office, and would not suffer from the loss of the transition allowance as Zinck had claimed. Gosse said the woman employed at Zinck's office had worked for more than two years and would thus be entitled to twelve weeks' pay as a result of the office closure. Gosse stated that if money is still owed by Zinck, it will be deducted from the transition allowance by the province and whatever remains will be given to Zinck.

On August 7, 2013, Zinck's sentencing hearing was adjourned until September 19, 2013. His lawyer, Lyle Howe, asked Judge Glen McDougall for the delay in order to get a mental health assessment for his client. Zinck had no comment when approached by reporters outside court. On August 16, 2013, Zinck's sentencing hearing was again rescheduled to October 1, 2013, when Howe told the provincial Supreme Court that he required more time to prepare.

Zinck's name was absent from the final list of candidates for the 2013 Nova Scotia provincial election, meaning that he decided not to run for re-election. He had earlier stated in August 2013 that he still planned to run provincially.

On October 9, 2013, Zinck was sentenced to four months in jail followed by one year of probation. He was also ordered to attend counselling regarding alcohol abuse, gambling addiction, and mental health issues.

=== Allegations of fraud ===
On October 8, 2010, the company holding the mortgage on Zinck's Dartmouth house, Credit Union Atlantic, stated that it intended to foreclose after Zinck stopped making payments. At the same time, Scott Marshall, a disabled man suffering from cerebral palsy who had hired Zinck to be his caregiver, alleged that Zinck fraudulently ran up a $9,000 bill on his Visa card playing online poker. Marshall said he was facing bankruptcy as a result. In response to Marshall's accusation, Zinck claimed that he was the victim of a smear campaign organized by the provincial NDP party, alleging that Marshall's mother had received payment from the party to come forward about his gambling issues, an allegation which was never proven. In 2015 Marshall said that Zinck had repaid some of the money but still owed him over $7,000. It was alleged that Zinck told Marshall that he would "make trouble" for him if he spoke publicly about the credit card issue.

Zinck has admitted to drinking and gambling problems in the past, for which he received counselling to "address the issues".

=== Impaired driving charge ===
Following an incident on October 2, 2013, Zinck was charged with impaired driving after registering a breathalyzer reading above the legal limit of 80 milligrams of alcohol in 100 millilitres of blood. At a preliminary hearing on January 27, 2014, Zinck pleaded not guilty in a Dartmouth courtroom to the charge of drunk driving.

On March 27, 2015, Halifax Regional Police officer Dan Kavanaugh told the provincial court that Zinck was belligerent and resistant when he was pulled over for a breathalyzer test on October 2, 2013. Kavanaugh said Zinck initially agreed to the breathalyzer but became increasingly unco-operative and began cursing and shouting, asking the police if they knew who he was. The officer testified that a cell phone Zinck was holding had to be wrestled away and Zinck had to be placed in handcuffs before officers could administer the breathalyzer, adding that Zinck later gave two additional breath samples at a police station which were both also over the legal limit. A day later, Zinck denied much of the testimony brought forward against him in court, claiming among other things that he was not behind the wheel of his car when police arrested him. On April 29, 2015, Zinck was found guilty of impaired driving and ordered to pay a $1,000 fine along with a one-year driving ban.

== Post-politics ==
On April 6, 2018, Halifax Regional Police issued a missing persons' news release seeking the public's help in locating the 47-year-old Zinck, who at that time had reportedly last been seen approximately one month prior in the Parkstone Road area of Dartmouth. Later that same day, police announced that they had located the former MLA but offered no further details regarding his disappearance. Zinck had been reported missing to police by an unknown party two days prior. Halifax police subsequently announced that Zinck had in fact never been missing. The missing person report had been called in by someone who was not a family member, and a member of Zinck's family later confirmed to police that Zinck was "alive and well" and was never missing.
