= Halifax County Dartmouth =

Former provincial electoral district in Nova Scotia, Canada

Nova Scotia electoral district

Defunct provincial electoral district
- Legislature: Nova Scotia House of Assembly
- District created: 1956
- District abolished: 1967
- Last contested: 1963

Halifax County-Dartmouth was a provincial electoral district in Nova Scotia, Canada, that elected one member to the Nova Scotia House of Assembly. It was created in 1956 and included a portion of the Halifax County and the Town of Dartmouth. It was dissolved in 1967 into Dartmouth North and Dartmouth South.

== Members of the Legislative Assembly ==
Halifax County-Dartmouth elected the following members to the Legislative Assembly:

Halifax County-Dartmouth
Legislature	Years	Member	Party
46th	1956–1960	Geoffrey W. Stevens	Liberal
47th	1960–1963	Gordon L. S. Hart	Liberal
48th	1963–1967	Irvin William Akerley	Progressive Conservative
District dissolved into Dartmouth North (1967–Present) and Dartmouth South (1967–2003)

== Election results ==
=== 1963 ===
1963 Nova Scotia general election
Party	Candidate	Votes	%	±%
Progressive Conservative	Irvin William Akerley	9,884	52.88%	9.83%
Liberal	Gordon L. S. Hart	8,150	43.60%	-2.85%
New Democratic	Edward B. Doyle	657	3.52%	-6.97%
Total		18,691	–	
Source(s) Source: Nova Scotia Legislature (2024). "Electoral History for Halifax County-Dartmouth" (PDF). nslegislature.ca. Nova Scotia Legislature (1963). Returns of the General Election for the House of Assembly (PDF) (Report). Queen's Printer. Archived from the original (PDF) on 25 July 2018.

=== 1960 ===
1960 Nova Scotia general election
Party	Candidate	Votes	%	±%
Liberal	Gordon L. S. Hart	8,258	46.46%	-3.23%
Progressive Conservative	Murray Ritcey	7,653	43.05%	-3.46%
Co-operative Commonwealth	Percy W. Dares	1,864	10.49%	6.68%
Total		17,775	–	
Source(s) Source: Nova Scotia Legislature (2024). "Electoral History for Halifax County-Dartmouth" (PDF). nslegislature.ca. Nova Scotia Legislature (1960). Returns of the General Election for the House of Assembly (PDF) (Report). Queen's Printer. Archived from the original (PDF) on 25 July 2018.

=== 1956 ===
1956 Nova Scotia general election
Party	Candidate	Votes	%	±%
Liberal	Geoffrey W. Stevens	7,276	49.69%	–
Progressive Conservative	C. J. Creighton	6,811	46.51%	–
Co-operative Commonwealth	Gerald Yetman	557	3.80%	–
Total		14,644	–	
Source(s) Source: Nova Scotia Legislature (2024). "Electoral History for Halifax County-Dartmouth" (PDF). nslegislature.ca. Nova Scotia Legislature (1956). Returns of the General Election for the House of Assembly (PDF) (Report). Queen's Printer. Archived from the original (PDF) on 10 September 2018.

== See also ==
- List of Nova Scotia provincial electoral districts
- Canadian provincial electoral districts
