= James A. Langille =

Canadian politician

MLA for Cumberland East
- In office 1953–1970
- Preceded by: Martin J. Kaufman
- Succeeded by: Roger Bacon

Personal details
- Born: February 18, 1909 Tatamagouche, Nova Scotia
- Died: April 10, 1979 (aged 70) St. Petersburg, Florida
- Party: Progressive Conservative
- Occupation: physician

James Arnold Langille (February 18, 1909 – April 10, 1979) was a Canadian politician. He represented the electoral district of Cumberland East in the Nova Scotia House of Assembly from 1953 to 1970. He was a member of the Progressive Conservative Party of Nova Scotia.

Born in 1909 at Tatamagouche, Nova Scotia, Langille was a graduate of Dalhousie University. He was a physician, and an eye, ear, nose and throat specialist. Langille married Marjorie Blair in 1934.

Langille entered provincial politics in the 1953 election, defeating Liberal incumbent Martin J. Kaufman by 179 votes in Cumberland East. He was re-elected in the 1956, 1960, 1963, and 1967 elections. He did not reoffer in the 1970 election. Langille died in St. Petersburg, Florida on April 10, 1979.
