= Raymond M. Smith =

Canadian politician

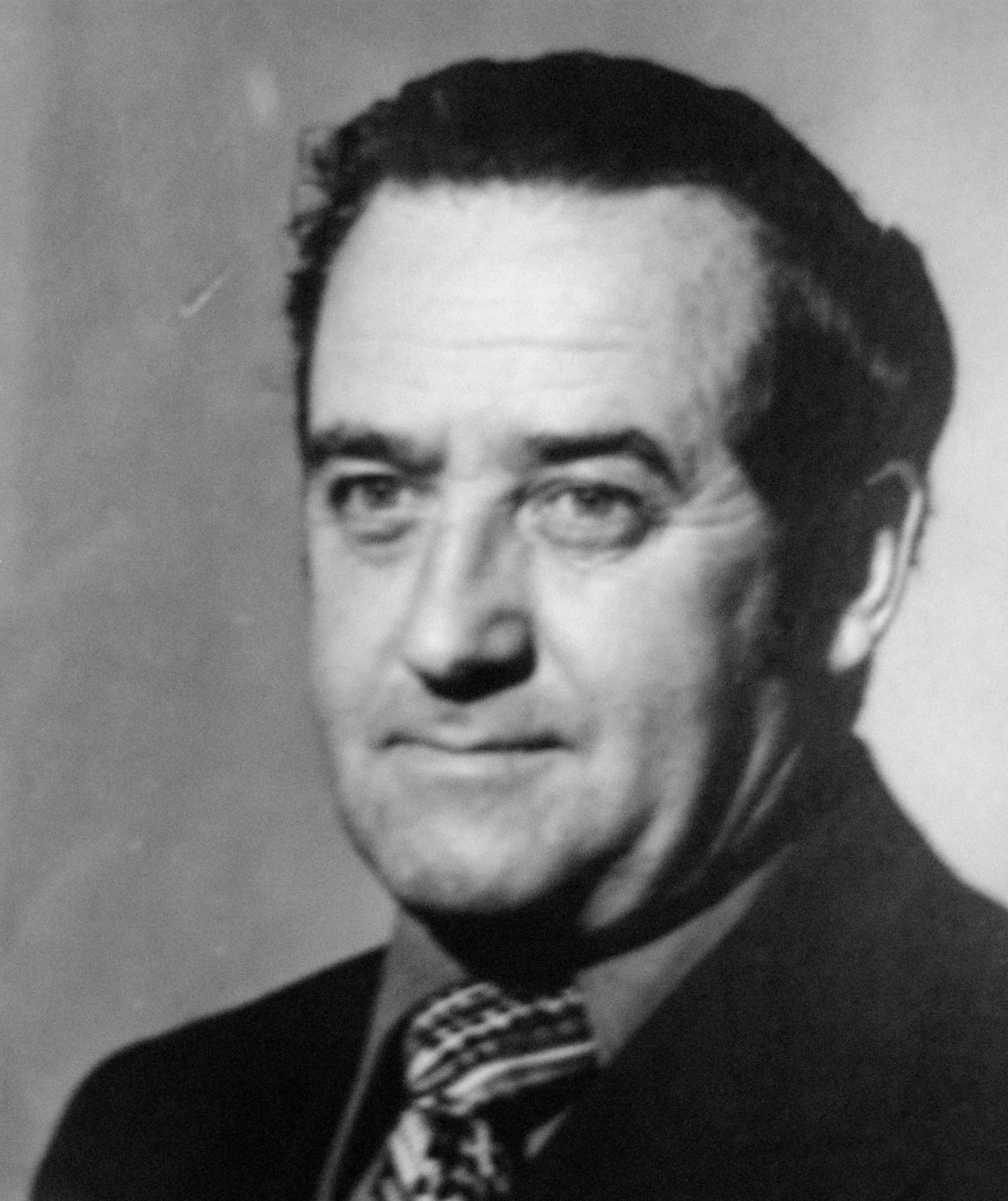

MLA for Cumberland Centre
- In office November 26, 1968 – 1974
- Preceded by: Stephen T. Pyke
- Succeeded by: Guy Brown

Personal details
- Born: August 3, 1924 Springhill, Nova Scotia
- Died: October 15, 1988 (aged 64) Springhill, Nova Scotia
- Party: Progressive Conservative
- Occupation: Sales representative

Raymond Morton Smith (August 3, 1924 – October 13, 1988) was a Canadian politician. He represented the electoral district of Cumberland Centre in the Nova Scotia House of Assembly from 1968 to 1974. He was a member of the Nova Scotia Progressive Conservative Party.

Smith was born in Springhill, Nova Scotia; his father was former Nova Scotia MLA for Cumberland, Archie B. Smith. He was educated at Acadia University and the Maritime College of Forest Technology and worked as a sales representative. In 1950, he married Anna Burden. He died in 1988.
