= Irvin William Akerley =

Canadian politician

Irvin William Akerley, CM (24 November 1904 – 11 March 1995) was a Nova Scotia businessman and politician.

Born in Pugwash, Nova Scotia, the son of Harry and Margaret MacLeod Akerley, he was a businessman in Dartmouth running his own businesses and working for others. In 1955, he was elected the first mayor of Dartmouth. He resigned to run for a seat in the Nova Scotia House of Assembly in the 1963 election and was elected as a Progressive Conservative representative for the district of Halifax County Dartmouth. He served in the Executive Council of Nova Scotia as Minister of Agriculture, and Minister of Highways. He was re-elected in the 1967 election in the new Dartmouth South riding. He was defeated when he ran for re-election in 1970 and later became Chairman of the Dartmouth General Hospital.

In 1978, Akerley was made a Member of the Order of Canada, Canada's highest civilian honour, "for the efforts he has devoted to the improvement of life in Nova Scotia, more especially while holding provincial cabinet posts. Also for contributions to the business and community life of Dartmouth during and after his terms as alderman and mayor".

Akerley Campus of the Nova Scotia Community College is named in his honour.
