= Peter M. Nicholson =

Canadian politician

Peter Nicholson
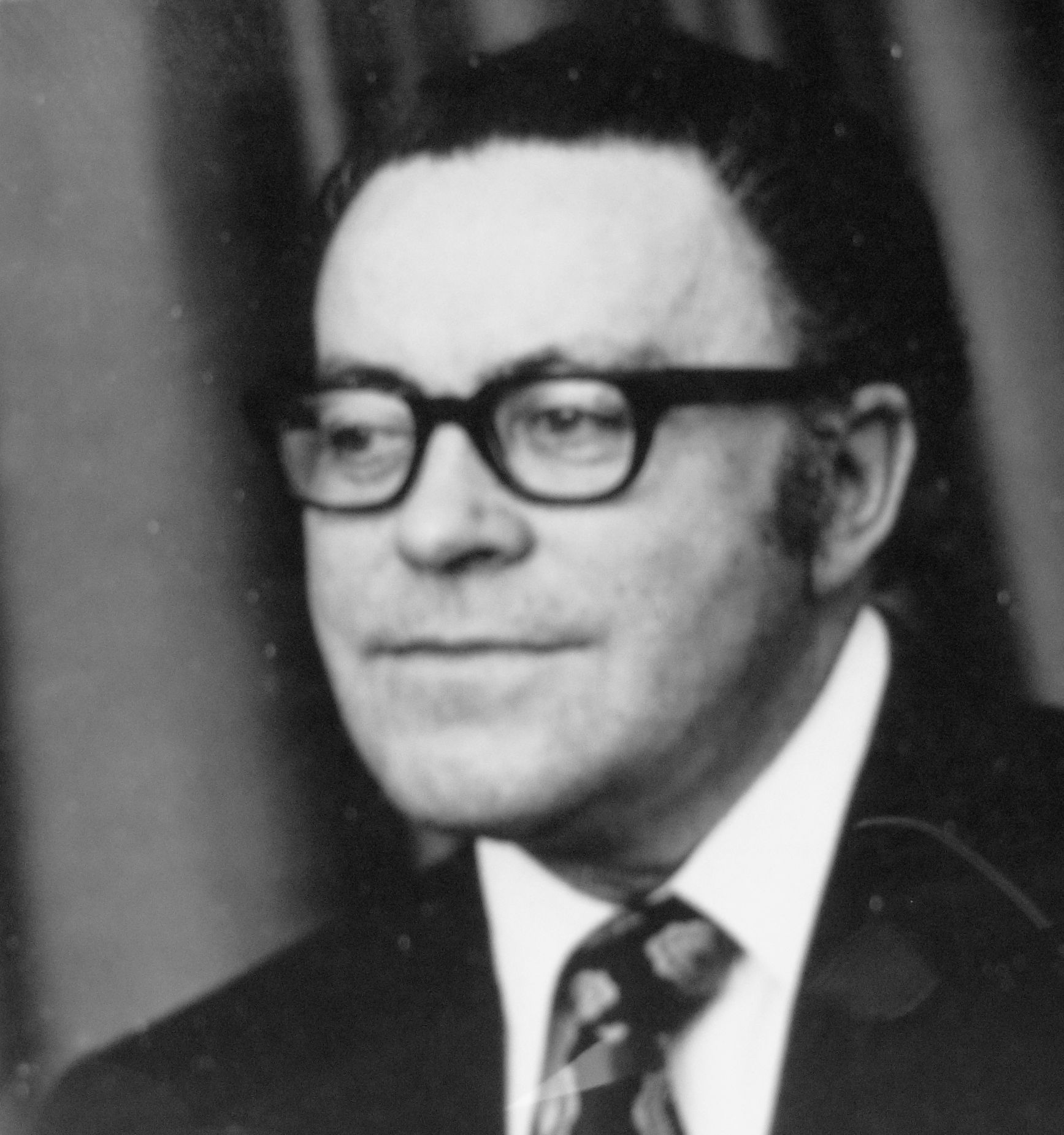

MLA for Annapolis West
- In office 1956–1978
- Preceded by: District created
- Succeeded by: Greg Kerr

Personal details
- Born: March 31, 1919 Springhill, Nova Scotia
- Died: August 17, 1986 (aged 67)
- Party: Liberal
- Occupation: Politician

Peter Murray Nicholson (March 31, 1919 – August 17, 1986) was a political figure in Nova Scotia, Canada. He represented Annapolis West in the Nova Scotia House of Assembly from 1956 to 1978 as a Liberal member.

A graduduate of Dalhousie University, Nicholson served in the Executive Council of Nova Scotia as Minister of Finance, and Deputy Premier.

In 1981, he was appointed a Justice of the Supreme Court of Nova Scotia.

== Personal life ==
His son Peter John Nicholson is also a member of the Nova Scotia Liberal Party and represented the electoral district of Victoria in the Nova Scotia House of Assembly from 1978 to 1980.
