= 2022 Nova Scotia Liberal Party leadership election =

Nova Scotia Liberal Party leadership election

- July 9, 2022
- Turnout: 3,287 Delegates
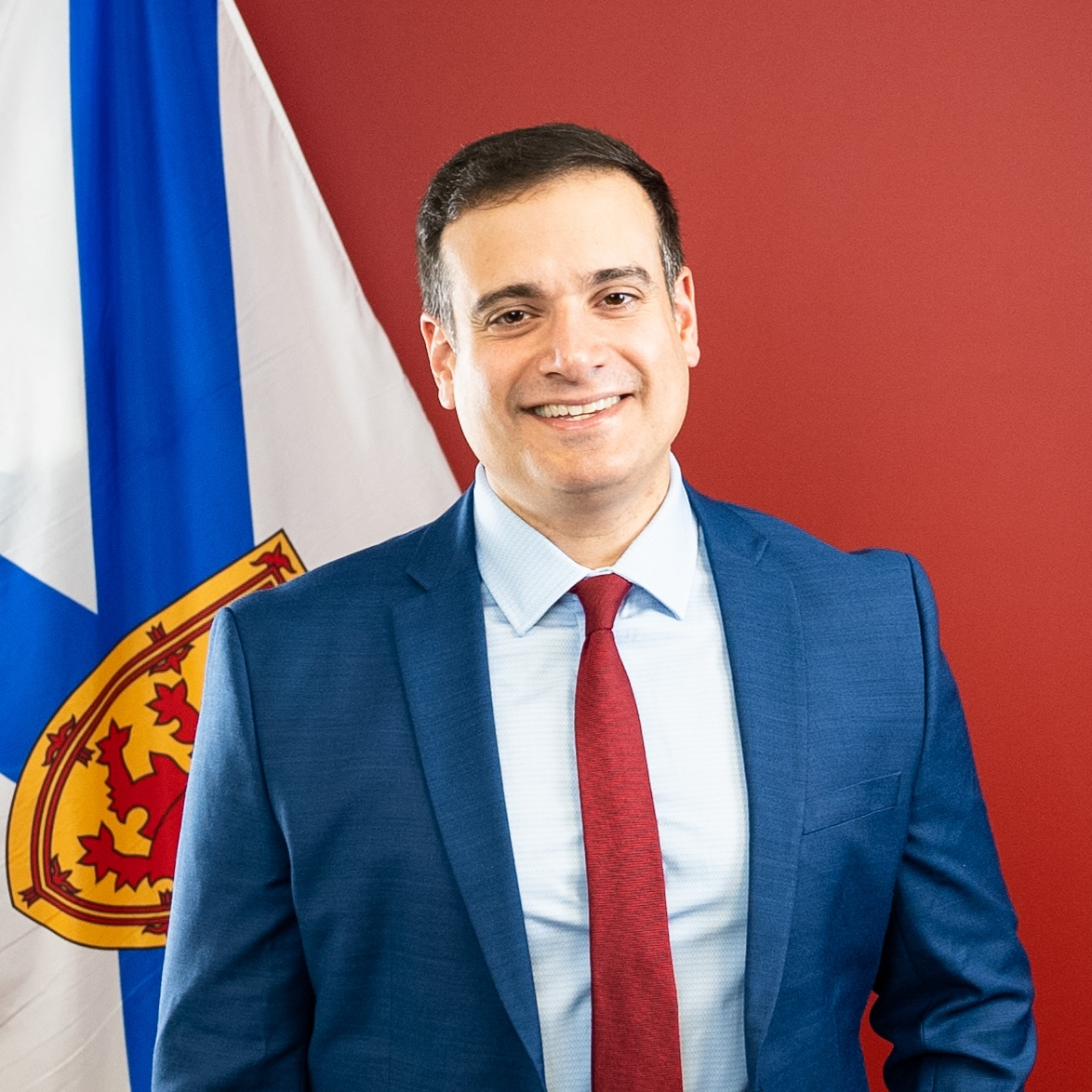

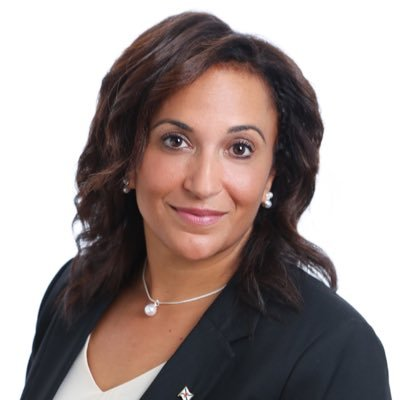
Candidate	Zach Churchill	Angela Simmonds
Riding	Yarmouth	Preston
First Ballot	3,580; 65.09%	1,920; 34.91%
Leader before election
Iain Rankin
Elected Leader
Zach Churchill

2022 Nova Scotia Liberal Party leadership election
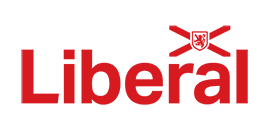
- Date: July 9, 2022
- Convention: Halifax Convention Centre
- Resigning leader: Iain Rankin
- Won by: Zach Churchill
- Ballots: 1
- Candidates: 2
- Entrance fee: $30,000
- Spending limit: $250,000

The 2022 Nova Scotia Liberal Party leadership election took place on July 9, 2022 to elect a leader to replace Iain Rankin, who announced his intent to resign on January 5, 2022 after leading the party since 2021 and following the party's defeat in the 2021 Nova Scotia general election.

== Background ==
Iain Rankin announced that he would be resigning as leader on January 6, 2022, following the party's defeat in the 2021 general election and after consulting with his family. Rankin remained Leader of the Opposition and leader of the Nova Scotia Liberal Party until a successor was chosen.

== Timeline ==
=== 2022 ===
- January 5 – Iain Rankin announces his resignation as leader of the Nova Scotia Liberal Party.
- January 30 – The party unveils the base set of rules for the election.
- February 4 – Angela Simmonds declares her candidacy.
- February 14 – The official rules for the leadership election will be released.
- February 19 – Zach Churchill declares his candidacy.
- March 4–5 – Liberal Party Annual General Meeting is held.
- March 5 – A new Nova Scotia Liberal Party board is elected.
- March 21 – Last day to register as a candidate.
- July 9 – Leadership convention is held.

== Candidates ==
=== Declared ===
==== Zach Churchill ====
Zach Churchill is the MLA for Yarmouth, having served since 2010. In the McNeil and Rankin governments, he served as Minister of Health and Wellness, Natural Resources, Municipal Affairs, Communications Nova Scotia, and Education and Early Childhood Development. Prior to announcing his candidacy, Churchill served as Deputy Leader of the Opposition as well as the critic for Health and Wellness and Health Care Professionals Recruitment.

Candidacy announced: February 19, 2022
Campaign website: www.votezachchurchill.ca

Platform of Zach Churchill

Platform:

- Building stronger links with: Liberal Caucus, Electoral District Associations, and Voters.
- Creation of an Election Readiness Committee
Endorsements of Zach Churchill (31)

MLAs: (7)

- Patricia Arab (MLA for Fairview-Clayton Park, 2013-2024; former Minister of Service Nova Scotia and Internal Services, and Minister of Communications Nova Scotia, 2017-2021)
- Braedon Clark (MLA for Bedford South, 2021-2024)
- Tony Ince (MLA for Cole Harbour, 2013-2024; former Minister of African Nova Scotian Affairs, Communications Nova Scotia, Communities, Culture and Heritage, and the Public Service Commission, 2013-2021)
- Carman Kerr (MLA for Annapolis, 2021-2024)
- Ronnie LeBlanc (MLA for Clare, 2021-2024)
- Rafah DiCostanzo (MLA for Clayton Park West, 2017-2024)
- Derek Mombourquette (MLA for Sydney-Membertou, 2015-Present)

Federal politicians: (1)

- Lena Diab (MP for Halifax West, 2021-Present; former MLA for Halifax Armdale, 2013-2021)

Municipal politicians: (3)

- Shawn Cleary (Councillor for Halifax Regional Council)
- Claude Poirier (Councillor for Inverness County, Nova Scotia)
- Matt Risser (Mayor of Lunenburg, Nova Scotia)

Former MLAs: (8)

- Labi Kousoulis (Former MLA for Halifax Citadel-Sable Island, 2013-2021; former Minister of the Public Service Commission, Internal Services, Labour and Advanced Education, Inclusive Economic Growth, Trade, and Finance and Treasury Board, 2013-2021)
- Margaret Miller (Former MLA for Hants East, 2013-2021; Former Minister of Environment)
- Keith Colwell (Former MLA for Preston-Dartmouth, 2003-2021; former Minister of Fisheries and Aquaculture, 2013-2021)
- David Wilton (Former MLA for Cape Breton Centre, 2015-2017)
- Gordon Wilson (Former MLA for Clare-Digby, 2013-2021; former Minister of Environment)
- Wayne Gaudet (Former MLA for Clare, 1993-2013; former Speaker of the Nova Scotia House of Assembly)
- Pam Eyking (Former MLA for Victoria-The Lakes, 2013-2017)
- Leo Glavine (Former MLA for Kings West, 2003-2021; former Minister of Health, 2013-2017)

Former federal politicians: (1)

- Robert Thibault (Former MP for West Nova, 2000-2008; former Minister of Fisheries and Oceans, 2002-2003)

Former municipal politicians: (1)

- Gloria McCluskey (Former Mayor of Dartmouth, 1992-1996)

Riding Association Executives:
Other prominent individuals: (10)

- Jennifer Naugler (Candidate of record for Lunenburg West, 2021)
- John John McCarthy (Candidate of record for Glace Bay-Dominion, 2021)
- Geof Turner (Candidate of record for Kings North, 2021)
- Kenny John Jackson (Candidate of record for Cumberland South, 2017)
- Martin MacKinnon (Candidate of record for Halifax, 2006)
- Penny Smith (Candidate of record for Shelburne, 2021)
- Paul Ratchford (Candidate of record for Northside-Westmount, 2019)
- Heather Peters (Candidate of record for Cape Breton East, 2021)
- Alxys Chamberlain (Candidate of record for West Nova, 2021)
- Vishal Bhardwaj (Candidate of record for Dartmouth South, 2017)

Total endorsements: 31

==== Angela Simmonds ====
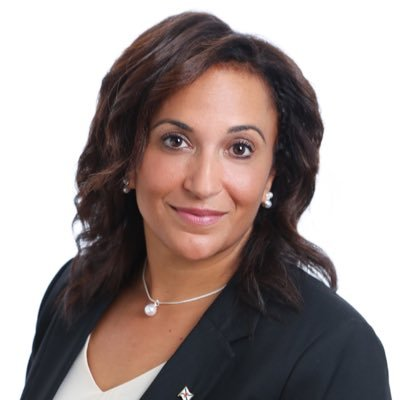
Angela Simmonds

Angela Simmonds is the MLA for Preston, having served since 2021. Prior to announcing her candidacy, Simmonds has been serving as Deputy Speaker of the Nova Scotia House of Assembly and Opposition critic for Justice, Office of Equity and Anti-Racism Initiatives, Human Rights Commission and Accessibility Act.

Candidacy announced: February 4, 2022
Campaign website: www.angelafornovascotia.ca

Platform of Angela Simmonds

Platform:

- Charting a clear path to renewal in the Nova Scotia Liberal Party.
- Increasing support for Liberal Electoral District Associations.
- Creation of an Election Readiness Committee within the Party.
- Increased diversity within the Nova Scotia Liberal Party and the provincial government.
Endorsements of Angela Simmonds (18)

MLAs: (3)

- Ali Duale (MLA for Halifax Armdale, 2021-2024)
- Brendan Maguire (MLA for Halifax Atlantic, 2013-Present; former Minister of Municipal Affairs, 2021)
- Fred Tilley, (MLA for Northside-Westmount, 2021-Present)

Federal politicians: (2)

- Andy Fillmore (MP for Halifax, 2015-2024; Parliamentary Secretary to the Minister of Innovation, Science and Industry, 2021-2023)
- Marci Ien (MP for Toronto Centre, 2020-2025; Minister for Women and Gender Equality and Youth, 2021-2025)

Municipal politicians:
Former MLAs: (4)

- Wayne Adams (Former MLA for Preston, 1993-1998; former Minister of the Environment; former Minister responsible for the Emergency Measures Act; former Minister responsible for the Nova Scotia Boxing Authority; former Deputy Mayor for Halifax, Nova Scotia, 1982-1983)
- Joanne Bernard (Former MLA for Dartmouth North, 2013-2017; former Minister of Community Services, 2013-2017)
- Don Downe (Former MLA for Lunenburg West, 1993-2003; Former President of the Nova Scotia Federation of Agriculture; Minister of Business and Consumer Services, (1993-1996); Minister of Transportation and Public Works, (1996-1998); Minister of Finance, (1998-2003); Minister of Environment, (1998-2003); Minister responsible for Aboriginal Affairs, (1998-2003); Deputy Premier, (1998-2003); Mayor of the Municipality of the District of Lunenburg, (2008-2016)
- Suzanne Lohnes-Croft (Former MLA for Lunenburg, 2013-2021)

Former federal politicians: (1)

- Jim Cowan (Former Senator for Nova Scotia, 2005-2017; Leader of the Senate Liberal Caucus, 2014-2016; Leader of the Opposition in the Senate, 2008-2015)

Former municipal politicians:
Riding Association Executives: (5)

- Sarah Douglas (Vice-President, Nova Scotia Liberal Party)
- Morgan Manzer (Policy Chair, Nova Scotia Liberal Party; former Chair of Halifax Pride, 2016-2022)
- John Robart (President of the Lunenburg Liberal Association)
- Kegan Palmer (President of the St. Francis Xavier University Liberal Association)

Other prominent individuals: (4)

- Nadine Bernard (Candidate of record for Victoria-The Lakes, 2021)
- Susan Holt (Candidate for leader of the New Brunswick Liberal Association, 2022; Candidate of record for Fredericton South, 2020)
- Frank McKenna (Candidate of record for Pictou Centre, 2021; President of Pictou Centre Liberal Association)
- Marni Tuttle (Candidate of record for Waverley-Fall River-Beaver Bank, 2021)

Total endorsements: 18

=== Declined ===
- Patricia Arab, MLA for Fairview-Clayton Park (2013-); former Minister of Service Nova Scotia and Internal Services, and Communications Nova Scotia. (Endorsed Churchill)
- Ali Duale, MLA for Halifax Armdale (2021-) (Endorsed Simmonds)
- Tony Ince, MLA for Cole Harbour (2013-); former Minister of African Nova Scotian Affairs, Communications Nova Scotia, Communities, Culture and Heritage, and the Public Service Commission. (Endorsed Churchill)
- Brendan Maguire, MLA for Halifax Atlantic (2013-); former Minister of Municipal Affairs. (Endorsed Simmonds)
- Kelly Regan, MLA for Bedford Basin (2009-); former Deputy Premier; former Minister of Community Services, Seniors, and Labour and Advanced Education.
- Fred Tilley, MLA for Northside-Westmount (2021-). (Endorsed Simmonds)

== Debates ==
Debates among candidates for the 2022 Liberal Party of Nova Scotia leadership election
No.	Date	Time	Place	Participants	
P Participant N Non-invitee A Absent invitee O Out of race (exploring or withdrawn)				Zach Churchill	Angela Simmonds
Nova Scotia Liberal Party leadership election debates
1	April 28, 2022	7 p.m.	Mount Saint Vincent University, Halifax	P	P
2	May 16, 2022	7 p.m.	Centre 200, Sydney	P	P
3	June 6, 2022	7 p.m.	White Point Beach Resort, White Point	P	P

== Results ==
= Winner

Candidate	Ballot 1	
Name	Votes	Points
Zach Churchill	2,186; 66.50%	3,580.00; 65.09%
Angela Simmonds	1,101; 33.50%	1,920.00; 34.91%
TOTAL	3,287	5,500

	Ballot 1				
Riding	Zach Churchill		Angela Simmonds		Total
Riding	Votes	Points	Votes	Points	Votes
Annapolis	68	75.00	23	25.00	91
Antigonish	46	65.00	25	35.00	71
Argyle	54	100.00	0	0.00	54
Bedford Basin	55	65.00	30	35.00	85
Bedford South	63	72.00	24	28.00	87
Cape Breton Centre-Whitney Pier	38	86.00	6	14.00	44
Cape Breton East	53	70.00	23	30.00	76
Chester-St. Margaret's	45	64.00	25	36.00	70
Clare	55	95.00	3	5.00	58
Clayton Park West	73	70.00	32	30.00	105
Colchester-Musquodoboit Valley	18	78.00	5	22.00	23
Colchester North	19	54.00	6	46.00	35
Cole Harbour	13	39.00	20	61.00	33
Cole Harbour-Dartmouth	56	65.00	30	35.00	86
Cumberland North	26	54.00	22	46.00	48
Cumberland South	23	72.00	9	28.00	32
Dartmouth East	52	54.00	44	46.00	96
Dartmouth North	23	43.00	30	57.00	53
Dartmouth South	22	42.00	30	58.00	52
Digby-Annapolis	30	73.00	11	27.00	41
Eastern Passage	21	75.00	7	25.00	28
Eastern Shore	24	59.00	17	41.00	41
Fairview-Clayton Park	45	70.00	19	30.00	64
Glace Bay-Dominion	61	88.00	8	12.00	69
Guysborough-Tracadie	20	65.00	11	35.00	31
Halifax Armdale	43	70.00	18	30.00	61
Halifax Atlantic	18	35.00	34	65.00	52
Halifax Chebucto	47	49.00	48	51.00	95
Halifax Citadel-Sable Island	81	65.00	43	35.00	124
Halifax Needham	48	44.00	60	56.00	108
Hammonds Plains-Lucasville	26	47.00	29	53.00	55
Hants East	30	71.00	12	29.00	42
Hants West	40	80.00	10	20.00	50
Inverness	55	70.00	24	30.00	79
Kings North	31	63.00	18	37.00	49
Kings South	27	52.00	25	48.00	52
Kings West	38	78.00	11	22.00	49
Lunenburg	24	65.00	13	35.00	37
Lunenburg West	35	64.00	20	36.00	55
Northside-Westmount	19	44.00	24	56.00	43
Pictou Centre	41	61.00	26	39.00	67
Pictou East	26	54.00	22	46.00	48
Pictou West	24	75.00	8	25.00	32
Preston	11	16.00	57	84.00	68
Queens	22	71.00	9	29.00	31
Richmond	80	88.00	11	12.00	91
Sackville-Cobequid	15	47.00	17	53.00	32
Sackville-Uniacke	11	48.00	12	52.00	23
Shelburne	26	96.00	1	4.00	27
Sydney-Membertou	58	87.00	9	13.00	67
Timberlea-Prospect	27	51.00	26	49.00	53
Truro-Bible Hill-Millbrook-Salmon River	27	57.00	20	43.00	47
Victoria-The Lakes	39	78.00	11	22.00	50
Waverley-Fall River-Beaver Bank	16	59.00	11	41.00	27
Yarmouth	198	99.00	2	1.00	200

== See also ==
- Next Nova Scotia general election
- 2021 Nova Scotia Liberal Party leadership election
- 2022 Nova Scotia New Democratic Party leadership election
