= 2021 Nova Scotia Liberal Party leadership election =

Nova Scotia Liberal Party leadership election

- February 6, 2021
- Turnout: 8,132 Delegates
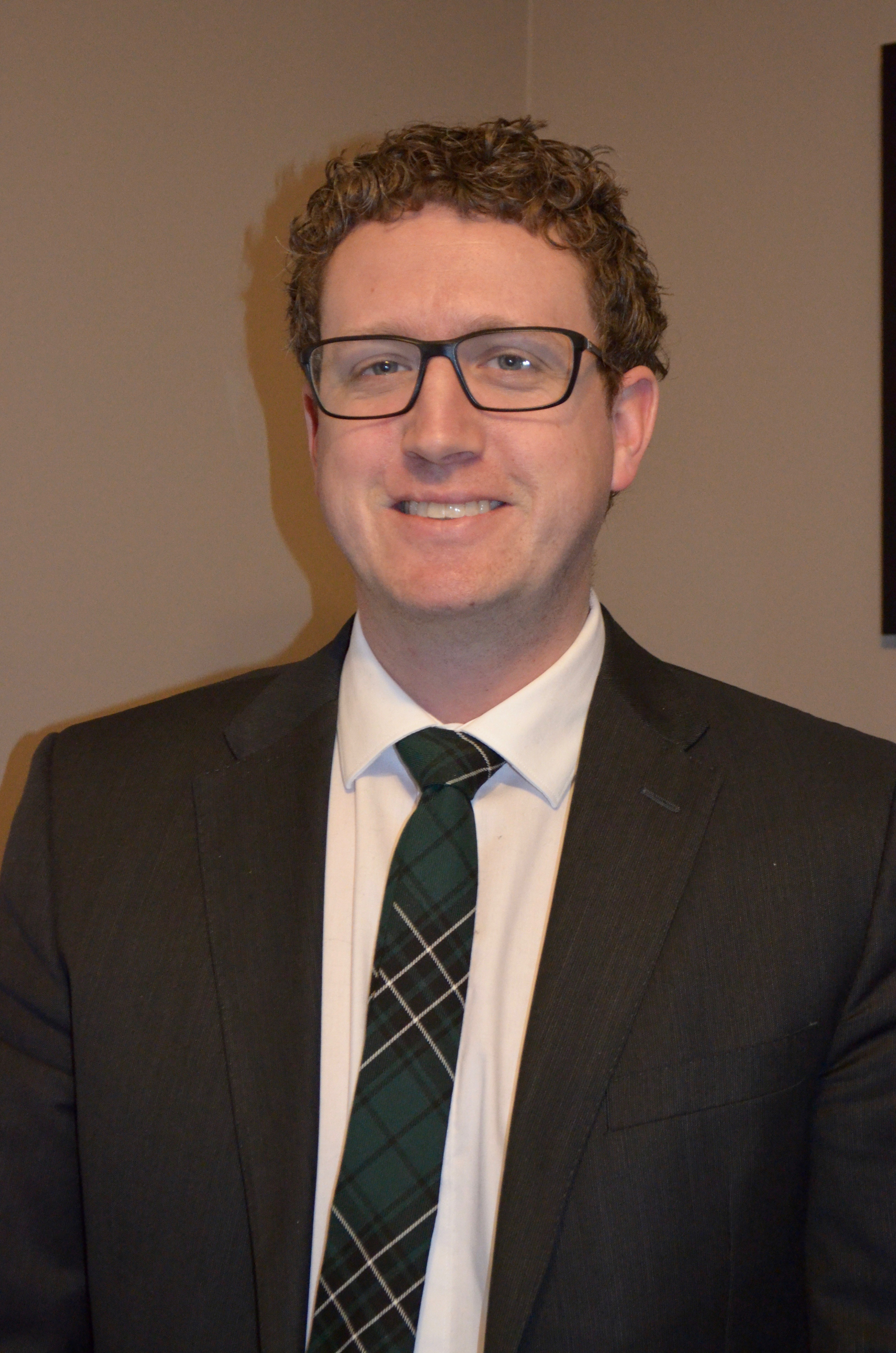

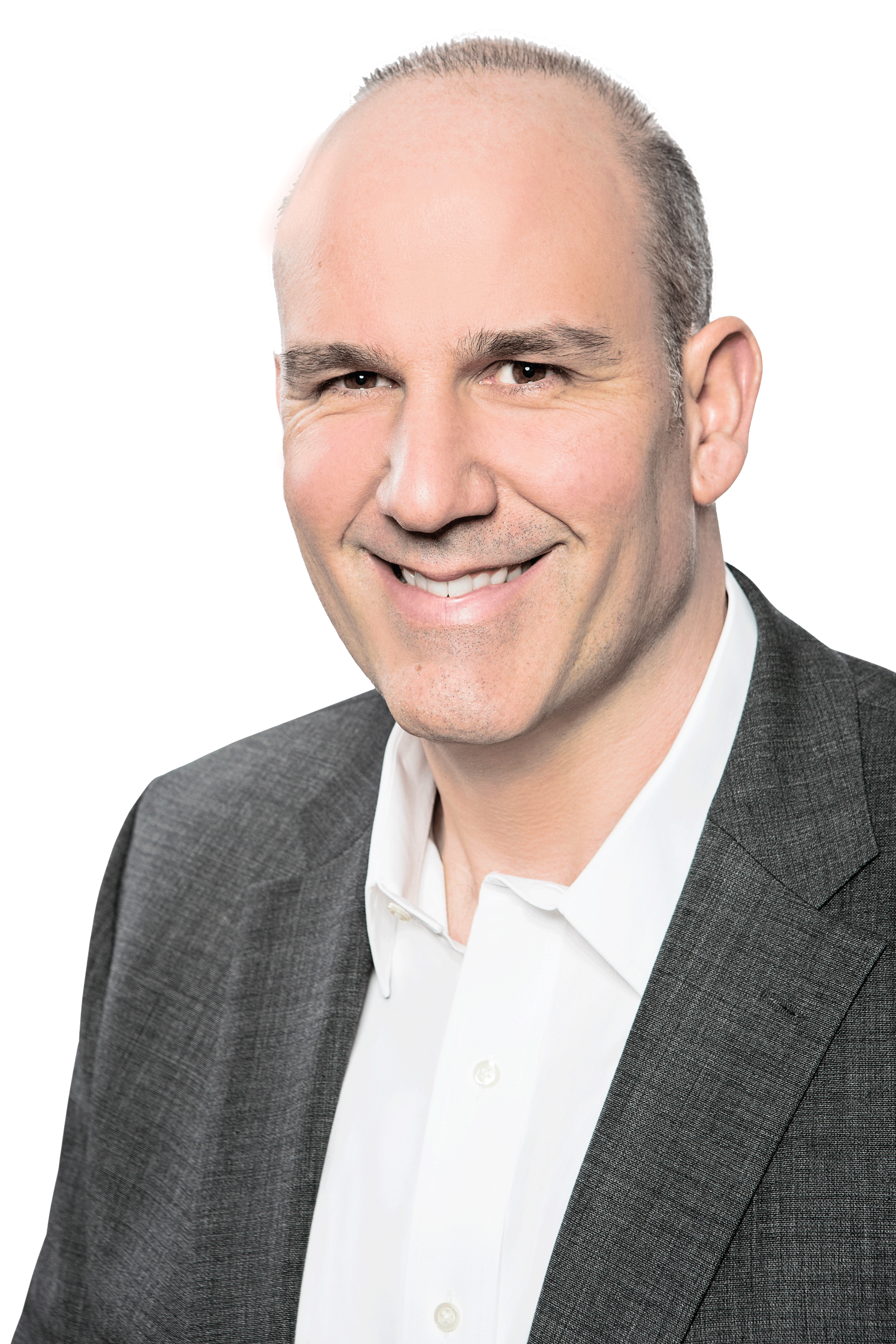

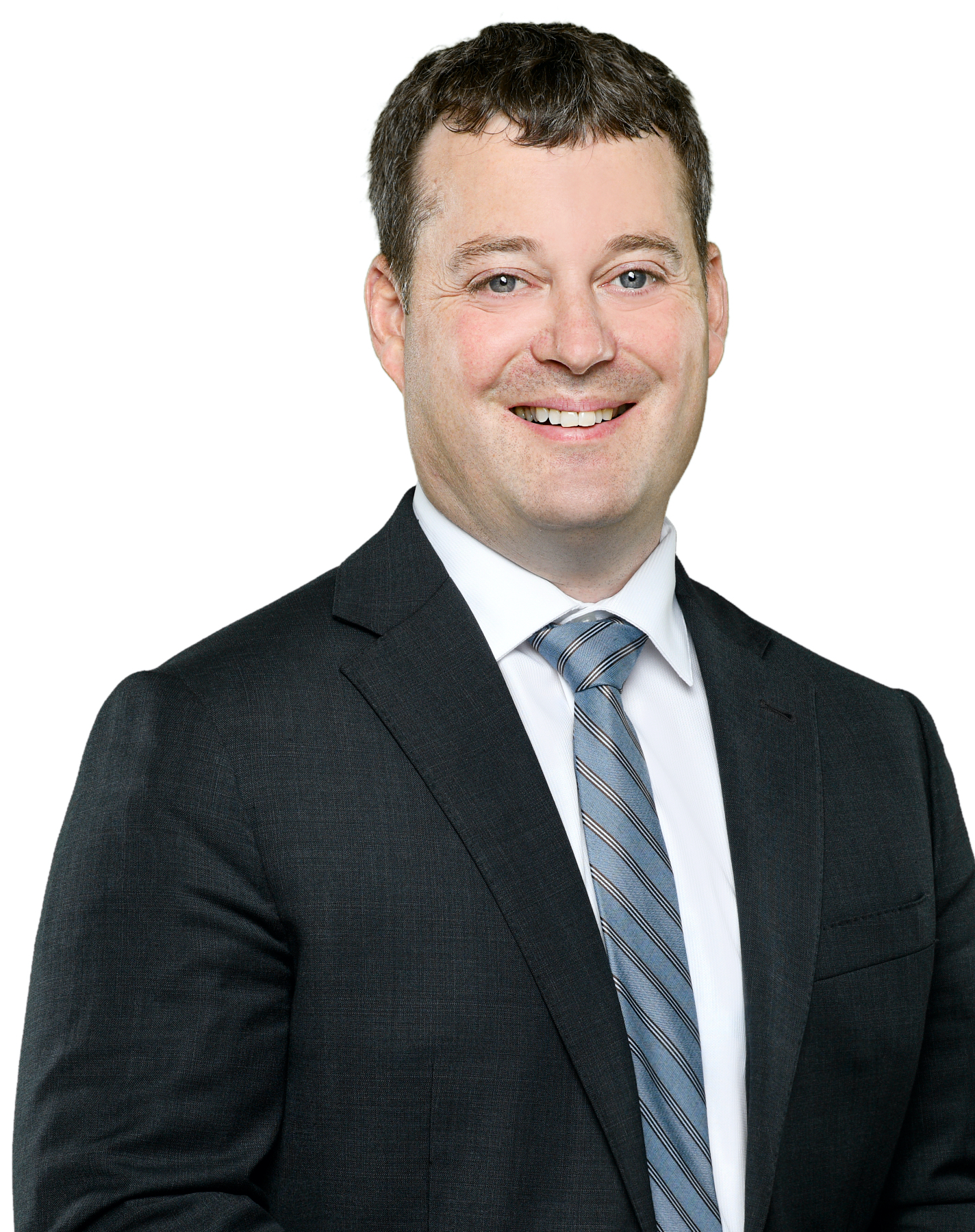
| Candidate | Iain Rankin | Labi Kousoulis | Randy Delorey |
| Riding | Timberlea-Prospect | Halifax Citadel-Sable Island | Antigonish |
| First ballot | 2,206.00; 40.11% | 2,023.69; 36.79% | 1,270.31; 23.10% |
| Second ballot | 2,882.31; 52.41% | 2,617.69; 47.59% | Eliminated |
Leader before election
Stephen McNeil
Elected Leader
Iain Rankin

2021 Nova Scotia Liberal Party leadership election
- Date: February 6, 2021
- Convention: Virtual
- Resigning leader: Stephen McNeil
- Won by: Iain Rankin
- Ballots: 2
- Candidates: 3
- Entrance fee: $60,000
- Spending limit: $350,000

The 2021 Nova Scotia Liberal Party leadership election took place on February 6 to elect a leader to replace Premier Stephen McNeil, who on August 6, 2020, announced his pending resignation after leading the party since 2007 and returning the party to government in 2013 after being out of power for fourteen years.

== Background ==
Stephen McNeil announced on August 6, 2020, pending resignation as party leader and premier, during the COVID-19 pandemic in Nova Scotia. McNeil remained as Premier and leader until the new leader was chosen.

== Timeline ==
=== 2020 ===
- August 6 – Stephen McNeil announces his pending resignation as Premier of Nova Scotia and leader of the Nova Scotia Liberal Party.
- August 22 – The party unveils the base set of rules for the election.
- September 14 – The official rules for the leadership election will be released.
- September 30 – Labi Kousoulis declares his candidacy.
- October 5 – Iain Rankin declares his candidacy.
- October 8 – Randy Delorey declares his candidacy.
- October 9 – Last day to register as a candidate.

=== 2021 ===
- January 7 – Last day to become an eligible party member.

== Candidates ==
=== Declared ===
==== Randy Delorey ====
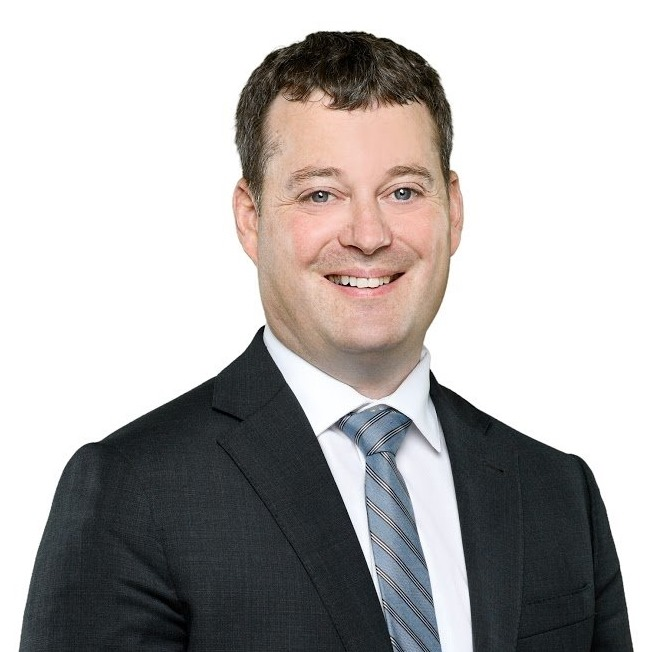
Randy Delorey

Randy Delorey was the MLA for Antigonish, having served since 2013. Prior to announcing his candidacy, Delorey had been serving as Minister of Gaelic Affairs since 2013 and the Minister of Health and Wellness since 2017. Previously, he has served as the Minister of the Environment (2013–2015; 2015–2016) and as Minister of Finance and Treasury Board (2015–2017).

Candidacy announced: October 9, 2020
Date registered with Elections Nova Scotia:
Campaign website: www.votedelorey.com

Policies

Endorsements of Randy Delorey (31)

MLAs: (7)

- Bill Horne (MLA for Waverley-Fall River-Beaver Bank)
- Suzanne Lohnes-Croft (MLA for Lunenburg)
- Margaret Miller (MLA for Hants East; former Minister of Environment, 2016–2017, 2018–2019; former Minister of Natural Resources, 2017–2018)
- Kelly Regan (Minister of Community Services; MLA for Bedford; wife of former Speaker of the House of Commons of Canada Geoff Regan)
- Gordon Wilson (Minister of Environment; MLA for Clare-Digby)
- Rafah DiCostanzo (MLA for Clayton Park West; Liberal Caucus Chair)
- Keith Colwell (MLA for Preston-Dartmouth)

Federal politicians: (2)

- Mike Kelloway (MP for Cape Breton—Canso)
- Geoff Regan (MP for Halifax West)

Municipal politicians:
Former MLAs:
Former federal politicians: (1)

- Rodger Cuzner (Former Chief Opposition Whip, 2008–2010; former MP for Cape Breton—Canso, 2004–2019; former MP for Bras d'Or—Cape Breton, 2000–2004)

Former municipal politicians: (2)

- Phil Mooney (Mayor of Yarmouth, Nova Scotia, 2008–2012)
- Francene Cosman (Mayor of Bedford, Nova Scotia)

Riding Association Executives: (13)

- Kim Robbins (Past President, Fairview-Clayton Park Liberal Association)
- Claude Poirier (President, Inverness Liberal Association)
- Tania Meloni (President, Clayton Park West Liberal Association)
- Burnell Lyons (Past President, Kings—Hants Liberal Association)
- Shawn Nicholson (President, Halifax Needham Liberal Association)
- Paul d'Eon (President, Hammonds Plains-Lucasville Liberal Association)
- Nicholas d'Entremont (Former Youth Chair, Argyle-Barrington Liberal Association)
- Dr. Paul Doucette (President, Bedford Basin Liberal Association)
- Jim McKenna (President, Pictou Centre Liberal Association)
- George Mbamalu (President, Cole Harbour Liberal Association)
- Andi Heffernan (President, Cape Breton Centre Liberal Association)
- Kerry O'Hearn (President, Preston-Dartmouth Liberal Association)
- John Robart (President, Lunenburg Liberal Association)

Other prominent individuals: (7)

- Dr. John Gillis (Former President of the Nova Scotia Liberal Party)
- Janet Becigneul (Secretary of the Nova Scotia Liberal Party)
- Kirby McVicar (Former Chief of Staff to Premier Stephen McNeil)
- Max Taylor (2020 Halifax mayoral candidate)
- Barry Mellish (2013 candidate for Truro-Bible Hill-Millbrook-Salmon River)
- Marc Botte (2019 by-election candidate for Sydney River-Mira-Louisbourg)
- Allan Kennedy (2020 by-election candidate for Truro-Bible Hill-Millbrook-Salmon River)

Organizations:
Media:
Total endorsements: 31

==== Labi Kousoulis ====
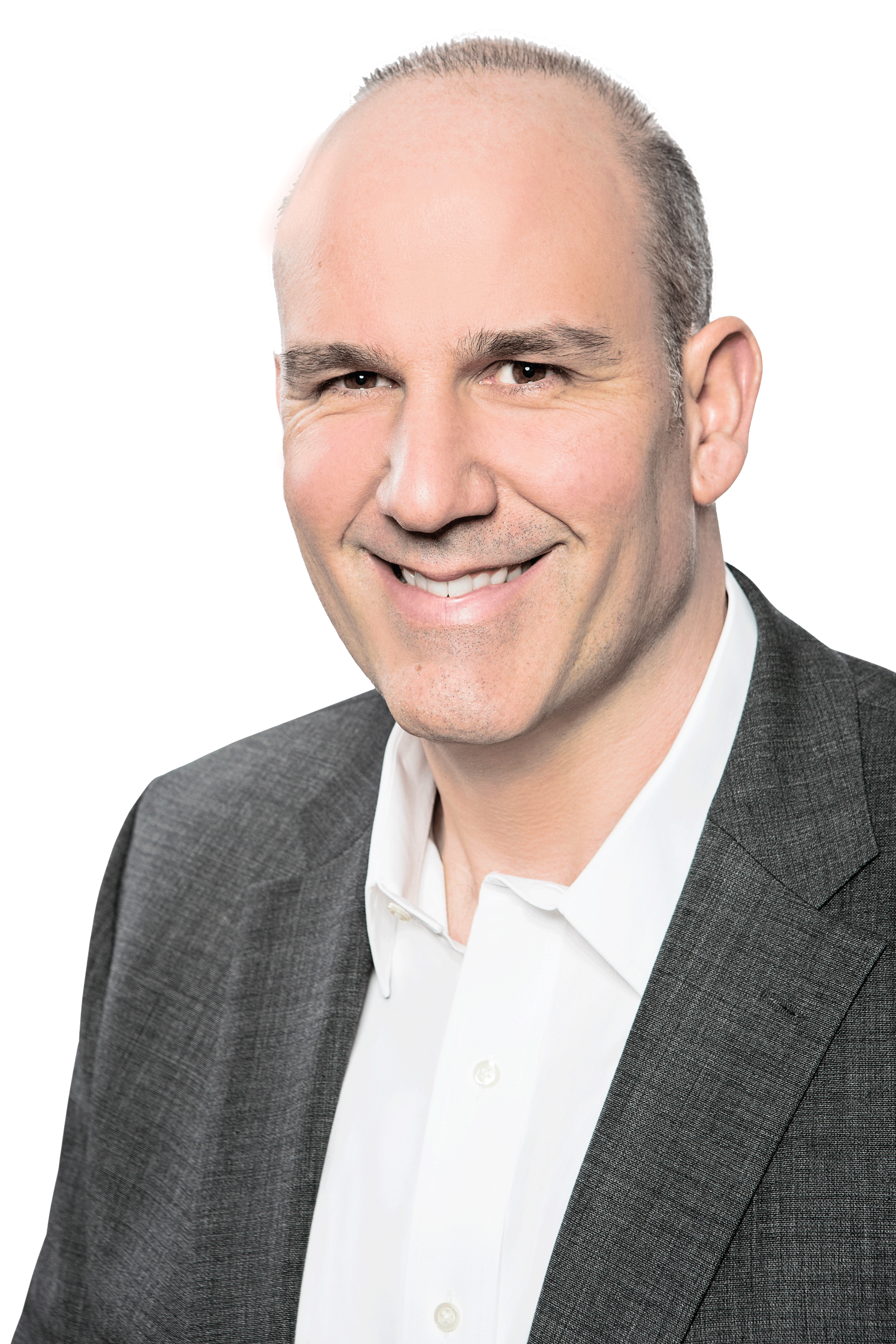
Labi Kousoulis

Labi Kousoulis was the MLA for Halifax Citadel-Sable Island, having served since 2013. Additionally, he was the Minister of Labour and Advanced Education since 2017, having resigned to run in the leadership race. He previously served as the Minister of the Public Service Commission (2013–2017) and Minister of Internal Services (2014–2017).

Candidacy announced: September 30, 2020
Date registered with Elections Nova Scotia:
Campaign website: votelabi.ca

Policies

Endorsements of Labi Kousoulis (13)

MLAs: (3)

- Patricia Arab (MLA for Fairview-Clayton Park)
- Lena Diab (MLA for Halifax Armdale)
- Lloyd Hines (MLA for Guysborough-Eastern Shore-Tracadie)

Federal politicians:
Municipal politicians:
Former MLAs: (1)

- Pam Eyking (Former MLA for Victoria-The Lakes, 2013–2017)
- Joachim Stroink (Former MLA for Halifax Chebucto, 2013–2017)

Former federal politicians: (3)

- Mary Clancy (Former MP for Halifax, 1988–1997)
- Bill Casey (Former MP for Cumberland—Colchester, 1988–1993, 1997–2009, 2015–2019)
- Mark Eyking (Former MP for Sydney—Victoria, 2000 – 2019)

Former municipal politicians:
Riding Association Executives: (1)

- Dominick Desjardins (President, Halifax Citadel-Sable Island Liberal Association)

Other prominent individuals: (3)

- Chief Terry Paul (Chief, Membertou First Nation)
- Melinda Daye (2017 Candidate, Halifax Needham)
- Michel Hindley (2017 Candidate, Sackville-Cobequid)
- Dr. Rodney Wilson (2016 Candidate, Halifax Needham)

Organizations:
Media:
Total endorsements: 13

==== Iain Rankin ====
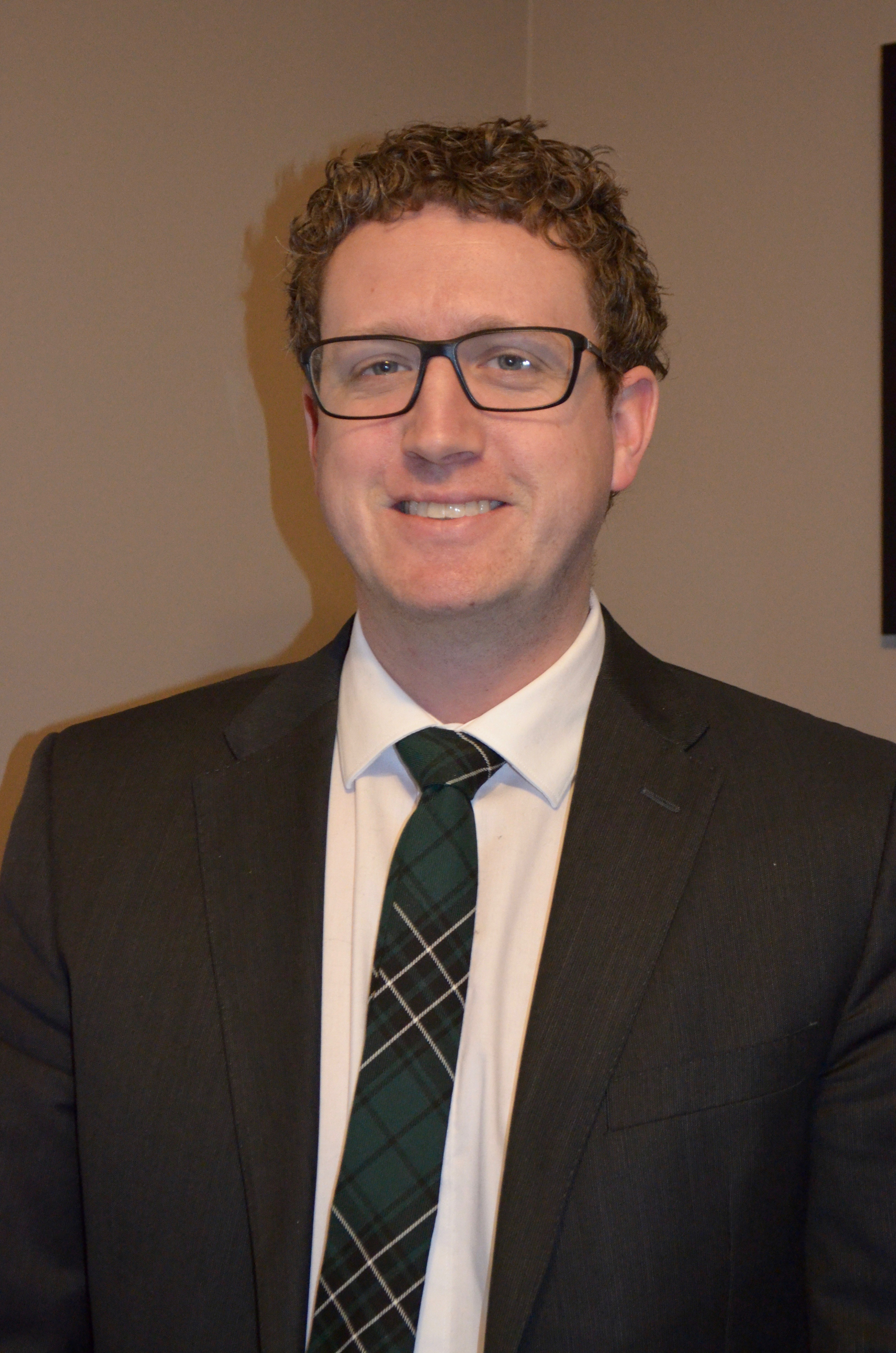
Iain Rankin

Iain Rankin was the MLA for Timberlea-Prospect, having served since 2013. Rankin served in cabinet as the Minister of Lands and Forestry since 2018, having resigned prior to announcing his candidacy. In addition, he previously served as Minister of Environment from 2017 to 2018 and was head of the Nova Scotia francophone parliamentarian association from 2014 to 2017.

Candidacy announced: October 5, 2020
Date registered with Elections Nova Scotia:
Campaign website: voterankin.ca

Policies

Endorsements of Iain Rankin (22)

MLAs: (6)

- Zach Churchill (Minister of Education and Early Childhood Development; MLA for Yarmouth)
- Keith Irving (MLA for Kings South)
- Ben Jessome (MLA for Hammonds Plains-Lucasville)
- Brendan Maguire (MLA for Halifax Atlantic)
- Derek Mombourquette (Minister of Energy and Mines; MLA for Sydney-Whitney Pier)
- Chuck Porter (Minister of Municipal Affairs; MLA for Hants West)

Federal politicians: (1)

- Kody Blois (MP for Kings—Hants)

Municipal politicians: (2)

- Alfred Poirier, (Inverness County Councillor)
- Tony Mancini, Councilor, Harbourview-Burnside-Dartmouth East (Halifax Regional Council)

Former MLAs: (3)

- Joanne Bernard (Former Minister of Community Services, 2013–2017; former MLA for Dartmouth North, 2013–2017)
- Diana Whalen (Former Deputy Premier, 2013–2017; former Minister of Finance, 2013–2015; former Minister of Justice and Attorney General, 2015–2017; former MLA for Clayton Park West, 2003–2017)
- Vince MacLean (Leader of the Nova Scotia Liberal Party, 1988)

Former federal politicians: (1)

- Colin Fraser (Former Member of Parliament for West Nova)

Former municipal politicians:
Riding Association Executives: (7)

- Sonia Dudka (President, Dartmouth North Liberal Association)
- Ryan Donato (President, Sackville-Cobequid and Sackville–Uniacke Liberal Association)
- Patti Simpson (President, Yarmouth Liberal Association)
- Peter DeWolf (President, Sydney–Membertou Liberal Association)
- Bob Prange (President, Kings South Liberal Association)
- Bob Sinden (President, Shelburne Liberal Association)
- Francis MacDonald (Past President, Clayton Park West Liberal Association

Other prominent individuals: (2)

- Geof Turner (2017 Candidate for Kings North)
- Paul Ratchford, 2019 Candidate for Northside–Westmount

Organizations:
Media:
Total endorsements: 22

=== Declined ===
- Joanne Bernard, former Minister of Community Services; former MLA for Dartmouth North
- Scott Brison, former MP for Kings—Hants; former federal Minister of Public Works and Government Services; former federal President of the Treasury Board
- Bill Casey, former MP for Cumberland-Colchester (1988–1993, 1997–2009, 2015–2019), former Chair of the House of Commons Health Committee
- Zach Churchill, Minister of Education and Early Childhood Development; MLA for Yarmouth
- Sean Fraser, MP for Central Nova
- Andy Fillmore, MP for Halifax
- Laurie Graham, chief of staff to Stephen McNeil
- Bernadette Jordan, federal Minister of Fisheries, Oceans, and the Canadian Coast Guard; former federal Minister of Rural Economic Development; MP for South Shore—St. Margarets
- Geoff MacLellan, Minister of Business, Trade, and Service; MLA for Glace Bay
- Lena Metlege Diab, Minister of Immigration; MLA for Halifax Armdale
- Kelly Regan, Minister of Community Services; MLA for Bedford; wife of former Speaker of the House of Commons of Canada Geoff Regan
- Darrell Samson, federal Parliamentary Secretary to the Minister of Veterans Affairs; MP for Sackville-Preston-Chezzetcook
- Mike Savage, Mayor of Halifax; former MP for Dartmouth—Cole Harbour

== Debates ==
Debates among candidates for the 2021 Liberal Party of Nova Scotia leadership election
| No. | Date | Time | Place | Participants | | |
| P Participant N Non-invitee A Absent invitee O Out of race (exploring or withdrawn) | | | | Iain Rankin | Labi Kousoulis | Randy Delorey |
|---|---|---|---|---|---|---|
Nova Scotia Liberal Party leadership election debates
| 1 | December 7, 2020 | 7 p.m. AST | Virtual | P | P | P |
| 2 | December 17, 2020 | 7 p.m. AST | Virtual | P | P | P |
| 3 | January 6, 2021 | 7 p.m. AST | Virtual | P | P | P |

== Results ==
= Eliminated from next round
= Winner

| Candidate | Ballot 1 | | Ballot 2 | |
| Name | Votes | Points | Votes | Points |
|---|---|---|---|---|
| Iain Rankin | 3,075; 39.02% | 2,206.00; 40.11% | 3,988; 52.31% | 2,882.31; 52.41% |
| Labi Kousoulis | 2,904; 35.71% | 2,023.69; 36.79% | 3,636; 47.69% | 2,617.69; 47.59% |
| Randy Delorey | 1,895; 24.05% | 1,270.31; 23.10% | Eliminated | |
| TOTAL | 7,881 | 5,500 | 7,624 | 5,500 |

| | Ballot 1 | | | | | | | Ballot 2 | | | | |
| Riding | Iain Rankin | | Labi Kousoulis | | Randy Delorey | | Total | Iain Rankin | | Labi Kousoulis | | Total |
| Riding | Votes | Points | Votes | Points | Votes | Points | Votes | Votes | Points | Votes | Points | Votes |
|---|---|---|---|---|---|---|---|---|---|---|---|---|
| Annapolis | 52 | 44.44 | 34 | 29.06 | 31 | 26.50 | 117 | 63 | 54.31 | 53 | 45.69 | 116 |
| Antigonish | 121 | 36.45 | 35 | 10.54 | 176 | 53.01 | 332 | 214 | 70.86 | 88 | 29.14 | 302 |
| Argyle | 29 | 32.22 | 24 | 26.67 | 37 | 41.11 | 90 | 40 | 47.06 | 45 | 52.94 | 85 |
| Bedford Basin | 73 | 27.55 | 100 | 37.74 | 92 | 34.72 | 265 | 129 | 50.99 | 124 | 49.01 | 253 |
| Bedford South | 69 | 23.55 | 108 | 36.86 | 116 | 39.59 | 293 | 115 | 44.92 | 141 | 55.08 | 256 |
| Cape Breton Centre-Whitney Pier | 48 | 53.93 | 30 | 33.71 | 11 | 12.36 | 89 | 55 | 62.50 | 33 | 37.50 | 88 |
| Cape Breton East | 59 | 52.21 | 32 | 28.32 | 22 | 19.47 | 113 | 74 | 66.07 | 38 | 33.93 | 112 |
| Chester-St. Margaret's | 77 | 45.56 | 54 | 31.95 | 38 | 22.49 | 169 | 97 | 57.40 | 72 | 42.60 | 169 |
| Clare | 29 | 45.31 | 26 | 40.63 | 9 | 14.06 | 64 | 34 | 54.84 | 28 | 45.16 | 62 |
| Clayton Park West | 97 | 24.74 | 157 | 40.05 | 138 | 35.20 | 392 | 166 | 43.68 | 214 | 56.32 | 380 |
| Colchester-Musquodoboit Valley | 33 | 39.29 | 39 | 46.43 | 12 | 14.29 | 84 | 35 | 42.17 | 48 | 57.83 | 83 |
| Colchester North | 40 | 40.82 | 30 | 30.61 | 28 | 28.57 | 98 | 54 | 56.84 | 41 | 43.16 | 95 |
| Cole Harbour | 16 | 27.59 | 25 | 43.10 | 17 | 29.31 | 58 | 23 | 41.82 | 32 | 58.18 | 55 |
| Cole Harbour-Dartmouth | 42 | 23.33 | 85 | 47.22 | 53 | 29.44 | 180 | 73 | 41.95 | 101 | 58.05 | 174 |
| Cumberland North | 36 | 51.43 | 22 | 31.43 | 12 | 17.14 | 70 | 43 | 61.43 | 27 | 38.57 | 70 |
| Cumberland South | 20 | 30.77 | 40 | 61.54 | 5 | 7.69 | 65 | 24 | 36.92 | 41 | 63.08 | 65 |
| Dartmouth East | 44 | 27.16 | 67 | 41.36 | 51 | 31.48 | 162 | 70 | 44.59 | 87 | 55.41 | 157 |
| Dartmouth North | 34 | 29.31 | 61 | 52.59 | 21 | 18.10 | 116 | 43 | 38.05 | 70 | 61.95 | 113 |
| Dartmouth South | 74 | 47.74 | 55 | 35.48 | 26 | 16.77 | 155 | 86 | 55.84 | 68 | 44.16 | 154 |
| Digby-Annapolis | 13 | 18.31 | 31 | 43.66 | 27 | 38.03 | 71 | 34 | 51.52 | 32 | 48.48 | 66 |
| Eastern Passage | 16 | 16.49 | 27 | 27.84 | 54 | 55.67 | 97 | 32 | 34.04 | 62 | 65.96 | 94 |
| Eastern Shore | 53 | 55.21 | 28 | 29.17 | 15 | 15.63 | 96 | 58 | 61.05 | 37 | 38.95 | 95 |
| Fairview-Clayton Park | 47 | 18.50 | 158 | 62.20 | 49 | 19.29 | 254 | 70 | 28.23 | 178 | 71.77 | 248 |
| Glace Bay-Dominion | 27 | 27.27 | 31 | 31.31 | 41 | 41.41 | 99 | 42 | 47.73 | 46 | 52.27 | 88 |
| Guysborough-Tracadie | 24 | 38.10 | 26 | 41.27 | 13 | 20.63 | 63 | 29 | 47.54 | 32 | 52.46 | 61 |
| Halifax Armdale | 74 | 27.92 | 136 | 51.32 | 55 | 20.75 | 265 | 93 | 36.47 | 162 | 63.53 | 255 |
| Halifax Atlantic | 74 | 48.05 | 55 | 35.71 | 25 | 16.23 | 154 | 86 | 56.95 | 65 | 43.05 | 151 |
| Halifax Chebucto | 75 | 30.12 | 134 | 53.82 | 40 | 16.06 | 249 | 96 | 39.51 | 147 | 60.49 | 243 |
| Halifax Citadel-Sable Island | 102 | 27.57 | 193 | 52.16 | 75 | 20.27 | 370 | 137 | 38.27 | 221 | 61.73 | 358 |
| Halifax Needham | 101 | 41.22 | 112 | 45.71 | 32 | 13.06 | 245 | 119 | 48.97 | 124 | 51.03 | 243 |
| Hammonds Plains-Lucasville | 77 | 48.73 | 34 | 21.52 | 47 | 29.75 | 158 | 106 | 68.83 | 48 | 31.17 | 154 |
| Hants East | 102 | 56.35 | 24 | 13.26 | 55 | 30.39 | 181 | 125 | 71.43 | 50 | 28.57 | 175 |
| Hants West | 59 | 58.42 | 23 | 22.77 | 19 | 18.81 | 101 | 68 | 68.69 | 31 | 31.31 | 99 |
| Inverness | 95 | 62.50 | 19 | 12.50 | 38 | 25.00 | 152 | 121 | 81.21 | 28 | 18.79 | 149 |
| Kings North | 72 | 61.02 | 35 | 29.66 | 11 | 9.32 | 118 | 80 | 68.38 | 37 | 31.62 | 117 |
| Kings South | 104 | 76.47 | 19 | 13.97 | 13 | 9.56 | 136 | 110 | 82.71 | 23 | 17.29 | 133 |
| Kings West | 39 | 42.86 | 28 | 30.77 | 24 | 26.37 | 91 | 48 | 55.17 | 39 | 44.83 | 87 |
| Lunenburg | 31 | 29.81 | 24 | 23.08 | 49 | 47.12 | 104 | 51 | 52.58 | 46 | 47.42 | 97 |
| Lunenburg West | 44 | 51.16 | 29 | 33.72 | 13 | 15.12 | 86 | 47 | 54.65 | 39 | 43.35 | 86 |
| Northside-Westmount | 45 | 49.45 | 38 | 41.76 | 8 | 8.79 | 91 | 49 | 54.44 | 41 | 45.56 | 90 |
| Pictou Centre | 28 | 20.44 | 83 | 60.58 | 26 | 18.98 | 137 | 45 | 33.58 | 89 | 66.42 | 134 |
| Pictou East | 28 | 31.11 | 48 | 53.33 | 14 | 15.56 | 90 | 34 | 38.64 | 54 | 61.36 | 88 |
| Pictou West | 38 | 43.18 | 31 | 35.23 | 19 | 21.59 | 88 | 46 | 53.49 | 40 | 46.51 | 86 |
| Preston | 25 | 31.25 | 43 | 53.75 | 12 | 15.00 | 80 | 28 | 36.36 | 49 | 63.64 | 77 |
| Queens | 22 | 45.83 | 17 | 35.42 | 9 | 18.75 | 48 | 26 | 54.17 | 22 | 45.83 | 48 |
| Richmond | 35 | 30.70 | 47 | 41.23 | 32 | 28.07 | 114 | 49 | 43.36 | 64 | 56.64 | 113 |
| Sackville-Cobequid | 30 | 31.58 | 47 | 49.47 | 18 | 18.95 | 95 | 40 | 43.01 | 53 | 56.99 | 93 |
| Sackville-Uniacke | 15 | 20.55 | 43 | 58.90 | 15 | 20.55 | 73 | 21 | 30.88 | 47 | 69.12 | 68 |
| Shelburne | 28 | 58.33 | 9 | 18.75 | 11 | 22.92 | 48 | 32 | 66.67 | 16 | 33.33 | 48 |
| Sydney-Membertou | 91 | 41.94 | 112 | 51.61 | 14 | 6.45 | 217 | 97 | 45.33 | 117 | 54.67 | 214 |
| Timberlea-Prospect | 239 | 76.60 | 50 | 16.03 | 23 | 7.37 | 312 | 249 | 81.11 | 58 | 18.89 | 307 |
| Truro-Bible Hill-Millbrook-Salmon River | 46 | 34.07 | 62 | 45.93 | 27 | 20.00 | 135 | 57 | 43.51 | 74 | 56.49 | 131 |
| Victoria-The Lakes | 39 | 47.56 | 27 | 32.93 | 16 | 19.5 | 82 | 49 | 61.25 | 31 | 38.75 | 80 |
| Waverley-Fall River-Beaver Bank | 38 | 35.51 | 39 | 36.45 | 30 | 28.04 | 107 | 53 | 50.48 | 52 | 49.52 | 105 |
| Yarmouth | 106 | 68.39 | 18 | 11.61 | 31 | 20.00 | 155 | 123 | 79.87 | 31 | 20.13 | 154 |
