= Leonard L. Pace =

Canadian politician

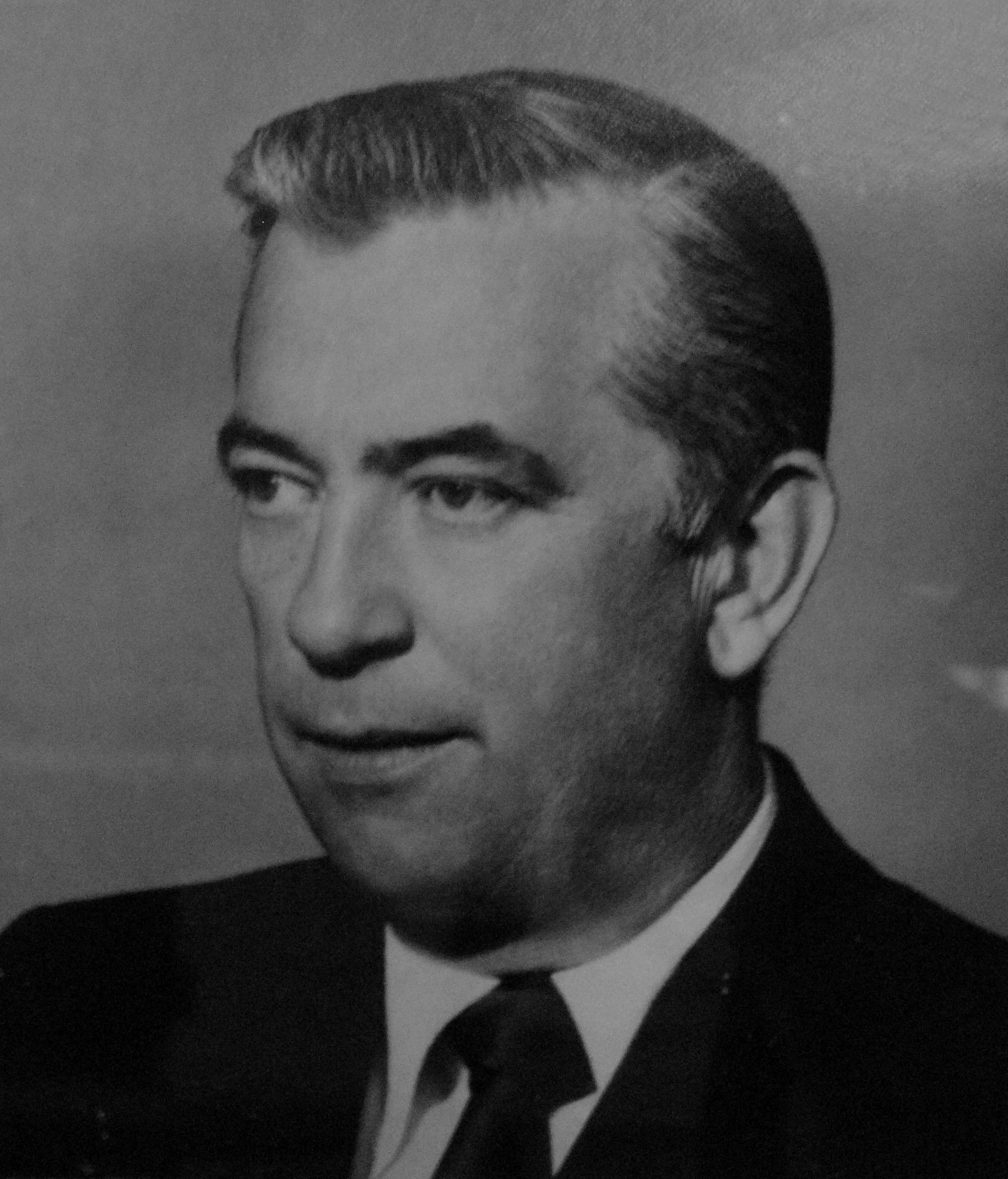

MLA for Halifax St. Margarets
- In office 1970–1978
- Preceded by: D. C. McNeil
- Succeeded by: Jerry Lawrence

Personal details
- Born: April 27, 1928 Halifax, Nova Scotia
- Died: March 23, 1991 (aged 62) Halifax, Nova Scotia
- Party: Liberal
- Occupation: Lawyer

Leonard Lawson Pace, QC (April 27, 1928 – March 23, 1991) was a Canadian politician. He represented the electoral district of Halifax St. Margarets in the Nova Scotia House of Assembly from 1970 to 1978. He was a member of the Nova Scotia Liberal Party.

Pace was born in Halifax, Nova Scotia. He attended Acadia University and Dalhousie University, earning a Bachelor of Laws degree from the latter in 1953. He later entered into law practice and was made a member of the Queen's Counsel. In 1951, he married Jean Shirley McFayden. He died in Halifax on March 23, 1991.

Pace entered provincial politics in the 1970 election, defeating Progressive Conservative incumbent D. C. McNeil in the Halifax St. Margarets riding. He was re-elected in the 1974 election. He served in the Executive Council of Nova Scotia as attorney general, minister of labour, minister of highways, and minister of mines. On April 21, 1978, Pace was appointed to the appeal division of the Supreme Court of Nova Scotia.
