= Zach Churchill =

Canadian politician from Nova Scotia

The Honourable Zach Churchill ECNS
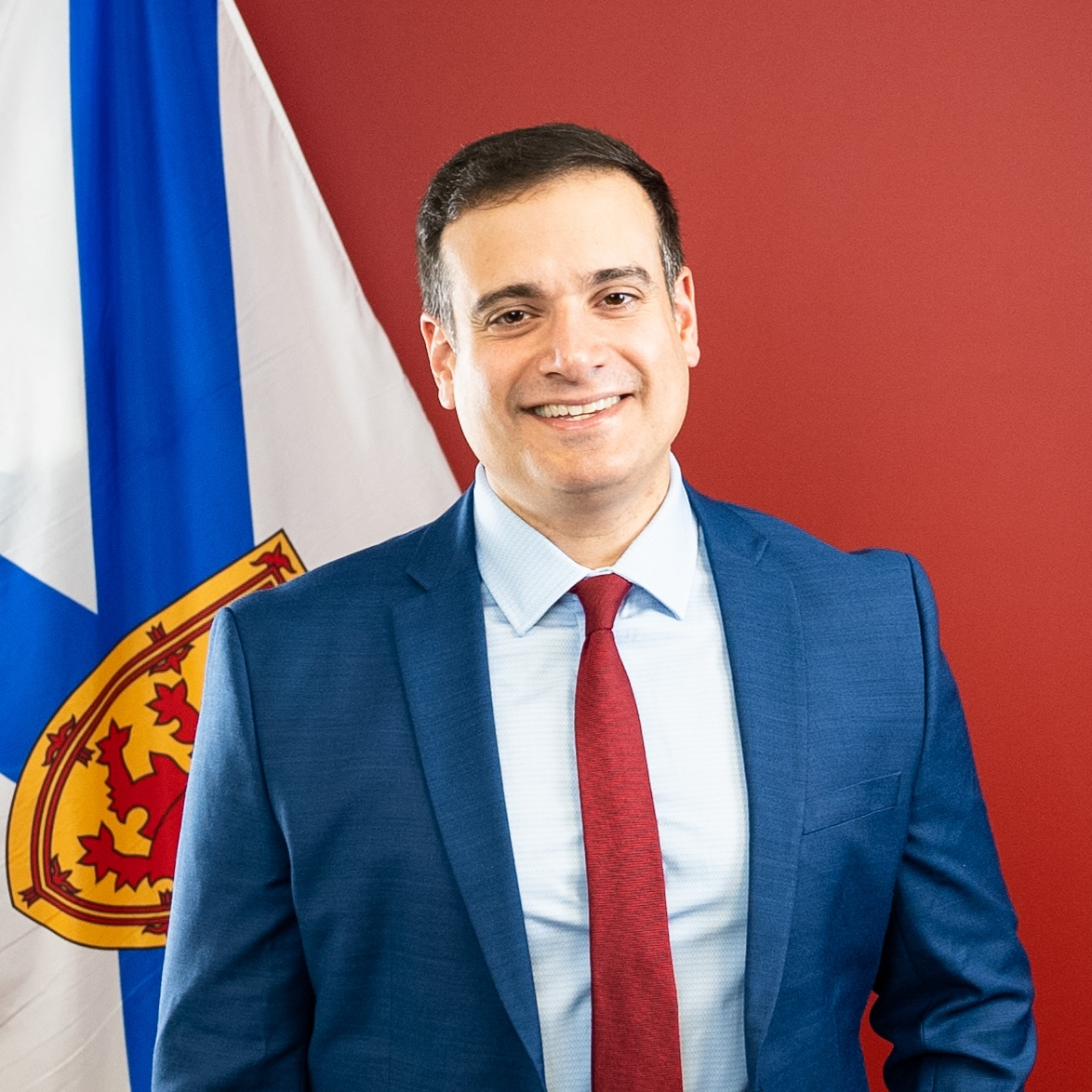

Leader of the Opposition (Nova Scotia)
- In office July 9, 2022 – October 27, 2024
- Preceded by: Iain Rankin
- Succeeded by: Claudia Chender

Leader of the Nova Scotia Liberal Party
- In office July 9, 2022 – December 10, 2024
- Preceded by: Iain Rankin
- Succeeded by: Derek Mombourquette (interim)

Member of the Nova Scotia House of Assembly for Yarmouth
- In office June 22, 2010 – October 27, 2024
- Preceded by: Richard Hurlburt
- Succeeded by: Nick Hilton

Personal details
- Born: Zachariah John Churchill Yarmouth, Nova Scotia
- Party: Liberal
- Education: Saint Mary's University (BA)

Zachariah John Churchill is a Canadian politician and activist from Nova Scotia who served as the leader of the Nova Scotia Liberal Party and the leader of the Opposition from 2022 until 2024. He previously served as the member of the Nova Scotia House of Assembly for Yarmouth, first elected from 2010 until 2024, and as a cabinet minister in various portfolios in the Stephen McNeil and Iain Rankin ministries, most notably as minister of health and wellness.

== Early life and education ==
Churchill graduated from Saint Mary's University in 2007 with a Bachelor of Arts degree. He served as National Director of the Canadian Alliance of Student Associations from 2007 to 2009, representing student organizations across Canada. In 2010, he was serving as policy analyst at the Department of Human Resources and Skills Development for the federal government before taking a leave of absence to run for the Nova Scotia Liberal Party in Yarmouth.

== Political career ==
Churchill was nominated by the Liberal Party in the riding of Yarmouth in May 2010. He won the by-election held on June 22, 2010, which was contested by six high-profile candidates. Churchill garnered over half the popular vote, defeating John Deveau, who had served as MLA for the region, and by Charles Crosby, who served as Mayor of Yarmouth for two decades, and two minor-party leaders.

Churchill was re-elected during the 2013 general election. On October 22, 2013, Premier Stephen McNeil appointed Churchill to the Executive Council of Nova Scotia as Minister of Natural Resources.

On July 24, 2015, McNeil shuffled his cabinet, moving Churchill to Minister of Municipal Affairs and Minister of Communications Nova Scotia. On June 15, 2017, Churchill was shuffled into the Minister of Education and Early Childhood Development portfolio.

As Minister of Education and Early Childhood Development, Churchill introduced major reforms into Nova Scotia's education system. This included the introduction of universal Pre-primary across the province, a Liberal campaign commitment during the 2017 election.

During the 2021 Nova Scotia Liberal Party Leadership Election, Churchill supported Iain Rankin in his bid to become leader. After Rankin became Leader of the Nova Scotia Liberal Party and Premier of Nova Scotia, Churchill became Minister of Health and Wellness, serving in Rankin's cabinet until August 31, 2021. Churchill served as Health Minister during the COVID-19 pandemic, holding the position for six months.

Churchill was re-elected for the fourth time in 2021, winning the riding of Yarmouth with 56% of the vote.

In the wake of the Liberal Party's defeat in the 2021 Nova Scotia general election, Churchill became Deputy Leader of the Official Opposition and Health Critic.

In February 2022, Churchill announced he was running for the leadership of the Nova Scotia Liberal Party. On July 9, 2022, he won the leadership election. In the 2024 Nova Scotia general election, Churchill led the Liberals to a third place finish with two seats, behind the PCs and NDP, one of the worst results in their history. He was unseated himself by 14 votes by Progressive Conservative candidate Nick Hilton.

He resigned as leader of the Nova Scotia Liberal Party party on December 10, 2024.

== Controversy ==
In 2019, PC Leader Tim Houston and another MLA alleged they had been accosted by Churchill. They described the incidents as verbally and physically threatening. Churchill admitted that he could be "confrontational", but denied physical altercations. In 2021, Maureen MacDonald, former NSNDP leader, said that Churchill had become physical with a member of her caucus, an allegation Churchill denied.

== Electoral record ==
2024 Nova Scotia general election: Yarmouth
| Party | Candidate | Votes | % | ±% |
|---|---|---|---|---|
| Progressive Conservative | Nick Hilton | 3,663 | 48.32 | +11.29 |
| Liberal | Zach Churchill | 3,647 | 48.11 | -8.21 |
| New Democratic | Gillian Rowley | 208 | 2.74 | -1.43 |
| Green | Adam Randall | 62 | 0.82 | -1.66 |
| Total valid votes | | 7,580 | 99.59 | |
| Total rejected ballots | | 31 | 0.41 | 0.00 |
| Turnout | | 7,611 | 52.68 | -2.07 |
| Eligible voters | | 14,447 | | |
| Progressive Conservative gain from Liberal | | Swing | | +9.77 |
Source: Elections Nova Scotia

2021 Nova Scotia general election
| Party | Candidate | Votes | % | ±% |
|---|---|---|---|---|
| Liberal | Zach Churchill | 4,344 | 56.32 | -11.85 |
| Progressive Conservative | Candice Clairmont | 2,856 | 37.03 | +11.53 |
| New Democratic | SJ Rogers | 322 | 4.17 | +1.09 |
| Green | Adam Randall | 191 | 2.48 | -0.76 |
| Total valid votes | | 7,713 | 99.56 | |
| Total rejected ballots | | 34 | 0.44 | |
| Turnout | | 7,747 | 55.17 | |
| Eligible voters | | 14,041 | | |
| Liberal hold | | Swing | | -11.69 |

2017 Nova Scotia general election
| Party | Candidate | Votes | % | ±% |
|---|---|---|---|---|
| Liberal | Zach Churchill | 5,364 | 68.17 | -13.91 |
| Progressive Conservative | Mitch Bonnar | 2,007 | 25.50 | +11.19 |
| Green | Jim Laverie | 255 | 3.24 | +2.26 |
| New Democratic | David Olie | 243 | 3.08 | +0.44 |

2013 Nova Scotia general election
| Party | Candidate | Votes | % | ±% |
|---|---|---|---|---|
| Liberal | Zach Churchill | 6,975 | 82.08 | +31.43 |
| Progressive Conservative | John Cunningham | 1,216 | 14.31 | -19.10 |
| New Democratic Party | Charles Webster | 224 | 2.64 | -3.88 |
| Green | Vanessa Goodwin-Clairmont | 83 | 0.98 | -0.36 |

Yarmouth By-election June 22, 2010
| Party | Candidate | Votes | % | ±% |
|---|---|---|---|---|
| Liberal | Zach Churchill | 3,984 | 50.65 | +36.58 |
| Progressive Conservative | Charles Crosby | 2,628 | 33.41 | -27.93 |
| Independent | Belle Hatfield | 673 | 8.56 | Ø |
| New Democratic Party | John Deveau | 513 | 6.52 | -16.41 |
| Green | John Percy | 49 | 0.62 | -1.04 |
| Atlantica | Jonathan Dean | 19 | 0.24 | Ø |
