= Patricia Arab =

Canadian politician

The Honourable Patricia Arab ECNS

Assembly Member for Fairview-Clayton Park
- In office October 8, 2013 – October 27, 2024
- Preceded by: Riding Established
- Succeeded by: Lina Hamid

Personal details
- Born: Patricia Arab Halifax, Nova Scotia, Canada
- Party: Liberal
- Education: Dalhousie University (BA); Mount Saint Vincent University (BEd); Acadia University (MEd)
- Occupation: Teacher/Counsellor

Patricia Arab is a Canadian politician, who was elected to the Nova Scotia House of Assembly in the 2013 provincial election. As a member of the Nova Scotia Liberal Party, she represented the electoral district of Fairview-Clayton Park until 2024.

== Early life ==
Arab was born in Halifax, Nova Scotia, where she was raised. She attended Halifax West High School.

Arab graduated with a Bachelor of Arts from University of Kings College/Dalhousie University, and went on to complete her Bachelor of Education and a Masters of Education in Counselling at Mount Saint Vincent University and Acadia University respectively.

Arab was hired by the South Shore Regional School Board shortly after completing her Masters of Education in Counselling. Arab was a Guidance Counsellor and Teacher at Forest Heights Community School, in Chester Grant, where she had the opportunity to work with Dr. Stan Kutcher, in piloting his Mental Health Curriculum, which has since been released nationally.

During her time at the South Shore Regional School Board, Arab facilitated the implementation of a preventative mental health program called PATHS (promoting alternate thinking strategies), which supported children in identifying, naming, and understanding their feelings as a tool to better handle and overcome moments of crisis in their lives. This program was piloted in three elementary schools just outside of Bridgewater.

== Political career ==
Arab was first elected to the Nova Scotia House of Assembly to represent Fairview-Clayton Park in 2013, making her one of the youngest female MLA ever elected in the province of Nova Scotia at that time. Arab was the Chair of the Community Services Committee, and a member of both the Law Amendments and Veterans Affairs Committees.

In 2014, Arab introduced Bill 44—Victoria Hall Continuation Act— an act supporting one of the oldest charitable organizations in the province of Nova Scotia, which for over 150 years has provided shelter, care and community to elderly women. This act received Royal Assent on November 20, 2014.

Arab is an active member of the Commonwealth Women Parliamentarians (Canada Region), which works for better representation of women in politics. Created in 2005, the Commonwealth Women Parliamentarians (Canada Region) is composed of women parliamentarians of the provincial and territorial legislatures, as well as the federal parliament. The objectives of the organization are to provide opportunities for strategic discussion and development for future and current parliamentarians, act on gender-related issues in Canada and internationally, and increase female representation in Canadian parliaments.

Arab was asked to represent Canada at the International Conference on Women in Politics, held in Amman, Jordan in May 2016. The conference was the first of its kind to be held in a Middle East North African country and united female Parliamentarians from across the world to engage in discussion about the importance of female decision-makers in today's global society.

In 2017, Arab was actively involved in supporting the Equal Voice Initiative-Daughters of the Vote, which invites one young women between the ages of 18 and 23 from every federal riding in Canada to represent their community and communicate their vision for Canada.

Arab was re-elected in the 2017 election.

On June 15, 2017 Patricia Arab was sworn in as the Minister of Internal Services and Minister of Communications Nova Scotia.

In May 2018, under her responsibility, 250 confidential documents were kept freely downloadable from a public server containing non-anonymized sensitive personal data of Canadian citizens and downloaded by a 19-year-old.

In July 2019, shortly after being asked to take on the added portfolio of Service Nova Scotia, Arab introduced changes allowing Nova Scotians the option of "X" or no gender on all government issued IDs

On February 23, 2021 Arab was appointed Minister of Service Nova Scotia and Internal Services in Premier Iain Rankin's newly formed cabinet.

Arab was re-elected in the 2021 election, however the Rankin Liberals lost government becoming the Official Opposition. As of September 22, 2024, Arab serves as the Official Opposition House Leader, and critic for Energy and the Office of Equity and Anti-Racism.

On November 26, 2024 Arab was defeated in the snap election called by Tim Houston.

== Community involvement ==
In 2015, Arab was the Honorary Chairperson for the inaugural Step Up Walk for Your Neighbour, a 3 kilometre walk that aims to raise awareness for those who are most in need in Halifax. In total, the event raised $54,000.

Arab was the Honorary Chairperson for the 11th Annual Lebanese Cedar Festival, an event that brings Lebanese culture to the city of Halifax, featuring authentic music, dance, and food prepared by members of the local community.

== Electoral record ==
2021 Nova Scotia general election
Party	Candidate	Votes	%	±%
Liberal	Patricia Arab	2,892	38.51	-1.39
New Democratic	Joanne Hussey	2,787	37.11	+8.34
Progressive Conservative	Nicole Mosher	1,678	22.34	-2.75
Green	Sheila Richardson	153	2.04	-3.08
Total valid votes		7,510	99.55	
Total rejected ballots		34	0.45	
Turnout		7,544	47.58	
Eligible voters		15,854		
Liberal hold		Swing		-4.87

2017 Nova Scotia general election
Party	Candidate	Votes	%	±%
Liberal	Patricia Arab	2925	39.9	-6.73
New Democratic Party	Joanne Hussey	2190	29.87	-1.27
Progressive Conservative	Paul Beasant	1839	25.08	+7.17
Green	Charlene Boyce	376	5.12	+3.24;

2013 Nova Scotia general election
Party	Candidate	Votes	%	±%
Liberal	Patricia Arab	3369	46.63	
New Democratic Party	Abad Khan	2250	31.14	
Progressive Conservative	Travis Price	1294	17.91	
Green	Raland Kinley	176	2.44	–
Independent	Katie Campbell	136	1.88	
