= Bill Estabrooks =

Canadian educator and politician (1947–2024)

The Honourable Bill Estabrooks ECNS
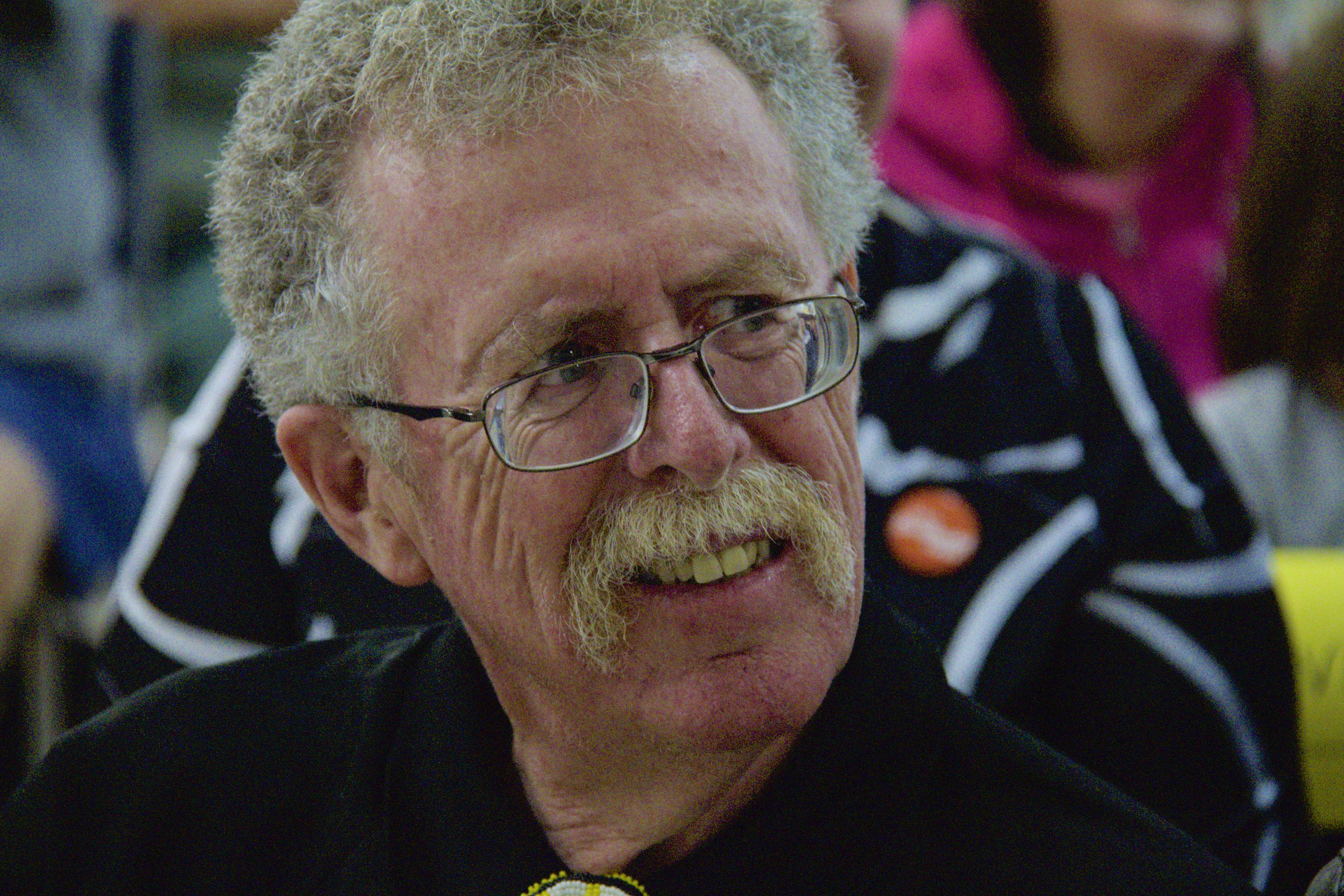
- Estabrooks in 2015

Member of the Nova Scotia House of Assembly for Timberlea-Prospect
- In office March 24, 1998 – October 8, 2013
- Preceded by: Bruce Holland
- Succeeded by: Iain Rankin

Minister of Transportation and Infrastructure Renewal
- In office June 19, 2009 – May 30, 2012
- Preceded by: Brooke Taylor
- Succeeded by: Maurice Smith

Minister of Energy
- In office June 19, 2009 – January 11, 2011
- Preceded by: Barry Barnet
- Succeeded by: Charlie Parker

Personal details
- Born: July 26, 1947 Sackville, New Brunswick, Canada
- Died: June 4, 2024 (aged 76) Edmonton, Alberta, Canada
- Party: NDP
- Occupation: School teacher

William Irvine Estabrooks (July 26, 1947 – June 4, 2024) was a Canadian educator and politician from Nova Scotia.

A native of Sackville, New Brunswick, Estabrooks attended Mount Allison University from which he graduated in 1969. Estabrooks found employment as a teacher in the communities around Halifax, Nova Scotia, residing in the suburban community of Upper Tantallon. Estabrooks taught at various schools in Halifax including Sir John A. Macdonald High, Sackville High and Brookside Junior High. He was involved in local chapters of the Lions Club as well as volunteering with local hockey and football teams. He was also a recipient of the Lions International Presidents' Recognition Award and the Medal of Bravery from the Governor General.

In 2015, the Hubley Community Centre was named the Estabrooks Community Hall in Bill Estabrooks' honour for his years of dedication to the community.

== Political career ==
Estabrooks ran for the nomination of the Nova Scotia New Democratic Party in the riding of Timberlea-Prospect in 1998. He was elected in the 1998 Nova Scotia election and was subsequently re-elected in the 1999, 2003, 2006 and 2009 provincial elections.

Estabrooks was appointed to the Executive Council of Nova Scotia in June 2009 where he served as Minister of Transportation and Infrastructure Renewal and Minister of Energy until his resignation from cabinet in May 2012.

== Later life and death ==
On September 10, 2010, Estabrooks announced that he had been diagnosed with Parkinson's disease in November 2008. He continued to serve in cabinet until his resignation on May 30, 2012. Estabrooks also announced his decision to not seek re-election in the next provincial election due to his health concerns.

Estabrooks later moved to Edmonton around 2019 to be closer to his family, where he resided in a care home. He died there on June 4, 2024, at age 76.
