= Pomegranate (phone) =

Fictional cell phone advertising campaign

The Pomegranate was a 2008 series of advertisements for a fictional mobile phone which was created as a marketing campaign on behalf of the government of Nova Scotia. The website advertising the product has comical features such as a harmonica, a coffee maker, a video projector, live voice translator, and a shaving razor.

The Pomegranate phone was a campaign from Communications Nova Scotia's "Come to Life" initiative, the place branding program of the Government of Nova Scotia. Communications Nova Scotia has been criticized by some for spending $175,000 on the ad campaign, though the website received over three million visits from 195 countries and territories since its launch on September 30, 2008, and they are considering it to be very successful.
