= Jerry Lawrence (politician) =

Canadian politician

The Honourable Jerry Lawrence ECNS CC

MLA for Halifax St. Margarets
- In office 1978–1993
- Preceded by: Leonard Pace
- Succeeded by: riding dissolved

Minister of Government Services
- In office June 22, 1979 – November 26, 1985
- Preceded by: new portfolio
- Succeeded by: Mike Laffin

Personal details
- Born: Gerald A. Lawrence; July 26, 1939 (age 87) Halifax, Nova Scotia
- Party: Progressive Conservative

Gerald A. Lawrence (born July 26, 1939) is a Canadian radio broadcaster and politician. He was the MLA for Halifax St. Margarets in the Nova Scotia House of Assembly from 1978 to 1993, and served in the Executive Council of Nova Scotia.

== Background ==
Due to polio, Lawrence become a paraplegic at the age of 12. He married Shelia Wooden in 1963.

== Employment history ==
Jerry "Jer Bear" Lawrence was a Metro Halifax radio personality on CHNS with his show Hello Metro. First employed in October 1959 as radio operator at CJCH Halifax, Lawrence started his on-air radio career in the summer of 1964. He later became the morning host on CJCH from 1967 to 1976. He then moved to Country 101 CHFX in 1976 but then returned part-time to CJCH. In 1985 he became the morning host at CHNS. Lawrence retired from broadcasting in 1995.

His morning signature show, Hello Metro, ran for over twenty years on three different radio stations in the Halifax metropolitan area.

== Political career ==
In 1974, Lawrence won a seat as Alderman for the city of Halifax, and in 1978 was elected to the Nova Scotia Legislature. He was re-elected in the 1981, 1984, and 1988 elections. On June 22, 1979, Lawrence was appointed to the Executive Council of Nova Scotia as Minister of Government Services. He served in the role until November 26, 1985, when he was replaced by Mike Laffin. Lawrence was to be sworn in as minister without portfolio the same day, but resigned from the cabinet. Lawrence was instrumental in getting the Nova Scotia Government to support handicapped parking and making the Halifax-Dartmouth area and Nova Scotia more "handicapped-friendly" during his time in government in 1978 to 1993. Under his portfolio an elevator was installed in Province House, making the Nova Scotia Legislature accessible for the first time for those who are disabled.

== Honours ==
- 1975: Eric Spicer Award as Halifax/Dartmouth's most outstanding citizen
- 1976: Vanier Award as one of five outstanding young Canadians
- 1980: Stairs Award as Nova Scotia's outstanding paraplegic
- 1988: Ice Capades Good Skate Award for community involvement
- 1995: the Canada Medal awarded by the Governor General
- 2002: Inducted to the Canadian Broadcasting Hall of Fame (CAB)
- 2005: Queen's Golden Jubilee Medal by the Premier of Nova Scotia
- 2007: Inducted into the Maritime Motorsports Hall of Fame Founder and first President of Atlantic Motorsport Karters Association.
- 2009: Lewis Lake Park was renamed Jerry Lawrence Provincial Park
- Honorary member of the International Firefighters Union
- One of the founding members of the Halifax "Flying Wheels" wheelchair basketball team 1958–59.
- Founder and manager of the Championship Bob McDonald "Chevys" baseball team 1967-1972.
- Honorary member of many automobile clubs including the Halifax Antique Car Club.
- Founder of the original IWK "250" stock car race at Riverside Speedway in Antigonish N.S. 1977. The race has contributed over $500,000 to the Children's Hospital since its inception.
- Honorary Chairman of the World Wheelchair basketball championships in Halifax N.S. 1980.
- First paraplegic to be named to the Executive Council of Nova Scotia 1979, Minister of Public Works.
- 2021: Awarded the Order of Canada.
