= Lina Hamid =

Canadian politician

Member of the Nova Scotia House of Assembly for Fairview-Clayton Park
- Incumbent
- Assumed office November 26, 2024
- Preceded by: Patricia Arab

Personal details
- Political party: Nova Scotia New Democratic Party

Lina Hamid is a Canadian politician who was elected in November 2024 to represent the riding of Fairview-Clayton Park as a member of the Nova Scotia New Democratic Party.

She is the first Sudanese Canadian to be elected into any provincial or federal positions. She was a Senior Manager at the United Way.

Lina Hamid is the Nova Scotia NDP critic for Justice, Community Services, Immigration, the Office of Cybersecurity and Digital Solutions, and Youth.
