= Iain Rankin =

Canadian politician

The Honourable Iain Rankin ECNS MLA
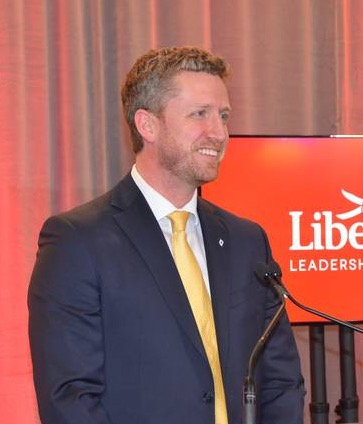
- Rankin in 2021

29th Premier of Nova Scotia
- In office February 23, 2021 – August 31, 2021
- Monarch: Elizabeth II
- Lieutenant Governor: Arthur J. LeBlanc
- Deputy: Kelly Regan
- Preceded by: Stephen McNeil
- Succeeded by: Tim Houston

Leader of the Nova Scotia Liberal Party
- In office Interim; December 8, 2025 – November 21, 2026
- Preceded by: Derek Mombourquette
- Succeeded by: Becky Druhan
- In office February 6, 2021 – July 9, 2022
- Preceded by: Stephen McNeil
- Succeeded by: Zach Churchill

Leader of the Opposition in Nova Scotia
- In office August 31, 2021 – July 9, 2022
- Preceded by: Tim Houston
- Succeeded by: Zach Churchill

Minister of Lands and Forestry
- In office July 5, 2018 – October 5, 2020
- Premier: Stephen McNeil
- Preceded by: Margaret Miller
- Succeeded by: Derek Mombourquette

Minister of Environment
- In office June 15, 2017 – July 5, 2018
- Premier: Stephen McNeil
- Preceded by: Margaret Miller
- Succeeded by: Margaret Miller

Member of the Nova Scotia House of Assembly for Timberlea-Prospect
- Incumbent
- Assumed office October 8, 2013
- Preceded by: Bill Estabrooks

Personal details
- Born: Iain Thomas Rankin; April 9, 1983 (age 43) Inverness, Nova Scotia, Canada
- Party: Liberal
- Spouse: Mary Chisholm
- Children: Freya Rose Rankin
- Education: Holland College; Mount Saint Vincent University (BBA); Université libre de Bruxelles (MA)
- Website: Official website

Iain Thomas Rankin ECNS MLA (born April 9, 1983) is a Canadian politician who served as the 29th premier of Nova Scotia from February 23, 2021, to August 31, 2021. He serves in the Nova Scotia House of Assembly for the Nova Scotia Liberal Party, representing the electoral district of Timberlea-Prospect and is currently the interim leader of the Liberal Party. Rankin was first elected in the 2013 Nova Scotia general election and was re-elected in the 2017, the 2021 and the 2024 general elections. On February 6, 2021, Rankin was announced the Leader of the Nova Scotia Liberal Party after a competitive leadership race.

On February 23, 2021, Rankin became the 29th premier of Nova Scotia. Rankin called an election for August 17, 2021, which his Liberal Party lost to the Progressive Conservative Party of Nova Scotia led by Tim Houston. Rankin left office as Premier on August 31, 2021.

Rankin thereafter served as Leader of the Opposition in the Nova Scotia House of Assembly. On January 5, 2022, Rankin announced that he will resign as leader of the Nova Scotia Liberal Party once a new leader is chosen. He was succeeded as leader by Zach Churchill in the 2022 leadership election.

He, and MLAs John Lohr, Brendan Maguire, and current premier Tim Houston are the longest serving current members of the Legislative Assembly of Nova Scotia, all four having first been elected at the 2013 provincial election.

== Early life and education ==
Iain Thomas Rankin was born in Inverness, Nova Scotia, and grew up in Timberlea. He is the son of long-term Halifax city councillor Reg Rankin. Rankin graduated from Sir John A. Macdonald High School in 2001. He received a diploma in Professional Golf Management from Holland College, a Bachelor of Business Administration from Mount Saint Vincent University in 2006 and a Master of Arts in International Politics at CERIS-ULB Diplomatic School of Brussels.

Before entering politics, Rankin was employed as an operations manager and as a project manager. He was the Director of Operations for Dymon Storage Corporation, in Ottawa, Ontario. After returning to Nova Scotia in 2011, Rankin managed the launch of Premiere Self Storage in Dartmouth as an operating partner. He went on to work as a project manager in the commercial division of Armco Capital.

== Advocacy ==
Rankin, a rescue dog owner, supported the Nova Scotia government's plan to outlaw tying pets up for longer than 12 hours. In 2014 with the support of local residents, Rankin participated in a campaign with lawn signs targeting speeders with a message to slow down. Through a private member's bill and was passed by the legislature, Rankin submitted Bill 176 which will restrict Otter Lake Waste Facility to its current height and size. Rankin advocated for the replacement of the aging Beechville, Lakeside, Timberlea recreation facility for several years. Following the 2020 announcement of federal and provincial funding for the BLT Community Centre, Rankin stated that he had “fought for this for many years” and described the project as one of the proudest achievements of his political career."Governments announce $10M in funding for new Beechville community centre". CityNews Halifax. 15 September 2020.

In 2015, Rankin chaired an all-Party working group established by the Committee on Assembly Matters. He introduced a motion to approve the Nova Scotia House of Assembly policy on prevention and resolution of harassment in the workplace, drafted by the all-Party working group established by this committee on September 28, 2015.

In April 2016, Rankin participated at the Community Services Standing Committee and introduced a motion asking that full funding for the Nova Scotia Association for Community Living (NSACL) be reinstated.

In November 2016, after the submissions were heard at Law Amendments Committee, Rankin proposed a motion to stand The Accessibility Act for further consultation, quoted as saying "We have a moral obligation to get this bill right."

During Rankin's time at Law Amendments Committee, Bill 59 (the Accessibility Act) was amended after witnesses appeared and staff consulted with representatives of persons with disabilities. It was moved to the Department of Justice and passed, in April 2017, with the intent of making the province accessible by 2030.

Rankin participated in a virtual event commemorating the 100th anniversary of the Nova Scotia Home for Colored Children in June 2021, speaking alongside MLA Tony Ince, Senator Wanda Thomas Bernard, Judge Corrine Sparks and Rev. Rhonda Britton.

== Political career ==
Rankin first ran for public office in the 2013 Nova Scotia general election and was elected to the Nova Scotia House of Assembly. During his first term, he served as the Liberal caucus chair. He was vice-chair of the public accounts committee, and a member of the assembly matters and the private and local bills committees. He was also a member of the House of Assembly Management Commission. Rankin announced the Bayers Lake Outpatient Centre in his riding with then premier Stephen McNeil in 2017, and it opened in 2023.

On June 15, 2017, Rankin was appointed to the Executive Council of Nova Scotia as Minister of Environment. Rankin hired the first dedicated crown prosecutor to handle cases related to the Environment Act, food safety, public health, meat inspection, fisheries and aquaculture, animal welfare, natural resources and the fur industry. Rankin passed legislation to introduce a cap and trade system in Nova Scotia. As Minister of Environment, Rankin joined other leaders across the continent agreeing to regional cooperation on carbon pricing in the Americas.

On July 5, 2018, Rankin was moved to Minister of Lands and Forestry in a cabinet shuffle. While Minister of Lands and Forestry, Rankin secured $47.9 million to clean up two former gold mines in what was the beginning of a project to evaluate and clean up all of the abandoned mine sites in Nova Scotia. Rankin signed the first ever Mi'kmaq Forest Initiative giving the Mi’kmaq forest planning and management responsibility on two blocks of Crown land, totalling about twenty-thousand hectares.

Rankin resigned from cabinet in October 2020 and announced his candidacy for the leadership of the Nova Scotia Liberal Party.

=== Premier of Nova Scotia ===
==== 2021 leadership campaign ====
On October 5, 2020, Rankin launched his campaign for leadership of the Nova Scotia Liberal Party, following Premier Stephen McNeil's announcement that he would be stepping down from his office.

On February 6, 2021, Rankin was announced the leader of the Nova Scotia Liberal Party, and premier-designate of Nova Scotia.

==== Tenure ====
On February 23, 2021, Iain Rankin became the 29th Premier of Nova Scotia, succeeding Stephen McNeil following a competitive leadership election. Following his election, he called a legislative session to pursue his legislative agenda, including an increase of $100 a month for all adults on income assistance, the largest single increase in the program's history, and efforts to address systemic racism and advance equality issues. These included passage of the Emancipation Day Act, which formally recognizes the day the British Parliament abolished slavery, and the Land Titles Initiative Acceleration Act, a bill that will help speed up the process of settling land titles for people living in historically Black communities. Rankin also appointed Andrea Anderson as the province's public service commissioner, the first person of colour to head the commission. Rankin created new Offices for Equity and Anti-Racism Initiatives, as well as Mental Health and Addictions. Rankin signed a $605 million agreement with the federal government to establish $10 per day childcare in Nova Scotia, by 2026.

Through the new Office of Equity and Anti-Racism Initiatives, Rankin announced the creation of a working group that would help with race-based data collection. The data would be used to help improve equity, inclusion and diversity in health care and address racism. To help address systemic racism in the justice system Rankin announced $4.8 million to establish the African Nova Scotian Justice Institute.

On his first day in office, Rankin announced incentives for the purchase of new and used electric vehicles as well as energy efficiency support for low-income Nova Scotians. In his throne speech, Rankin announced a commitment to get Nova Scotia off coal by 2030, ten years earlier than previously planned. The Environment Department was renamed Environment and Climate Change to highlight Rankin's commitment to the issue, and all mandate letters to ministers noted the need to consider climate change and for it to factor into their respective policy and program decisions. The Rankin government announced 61 more wilderness areas, nature reserves and provincial parks.

In recognition of Mi'kmaq people, language, and the significant geographical location, Rankin unveiled a new sign in Mi'kmaq, labelled "Pjila'si Unama'kik", at the causeway in Cape Breton, along with Mi'kmaq elders and chiefs.

The Rankin government invested $5 million to help make the sports more inclusive and accessible, the biggest investment in community and amateur sport in recent Nova Scotian history.

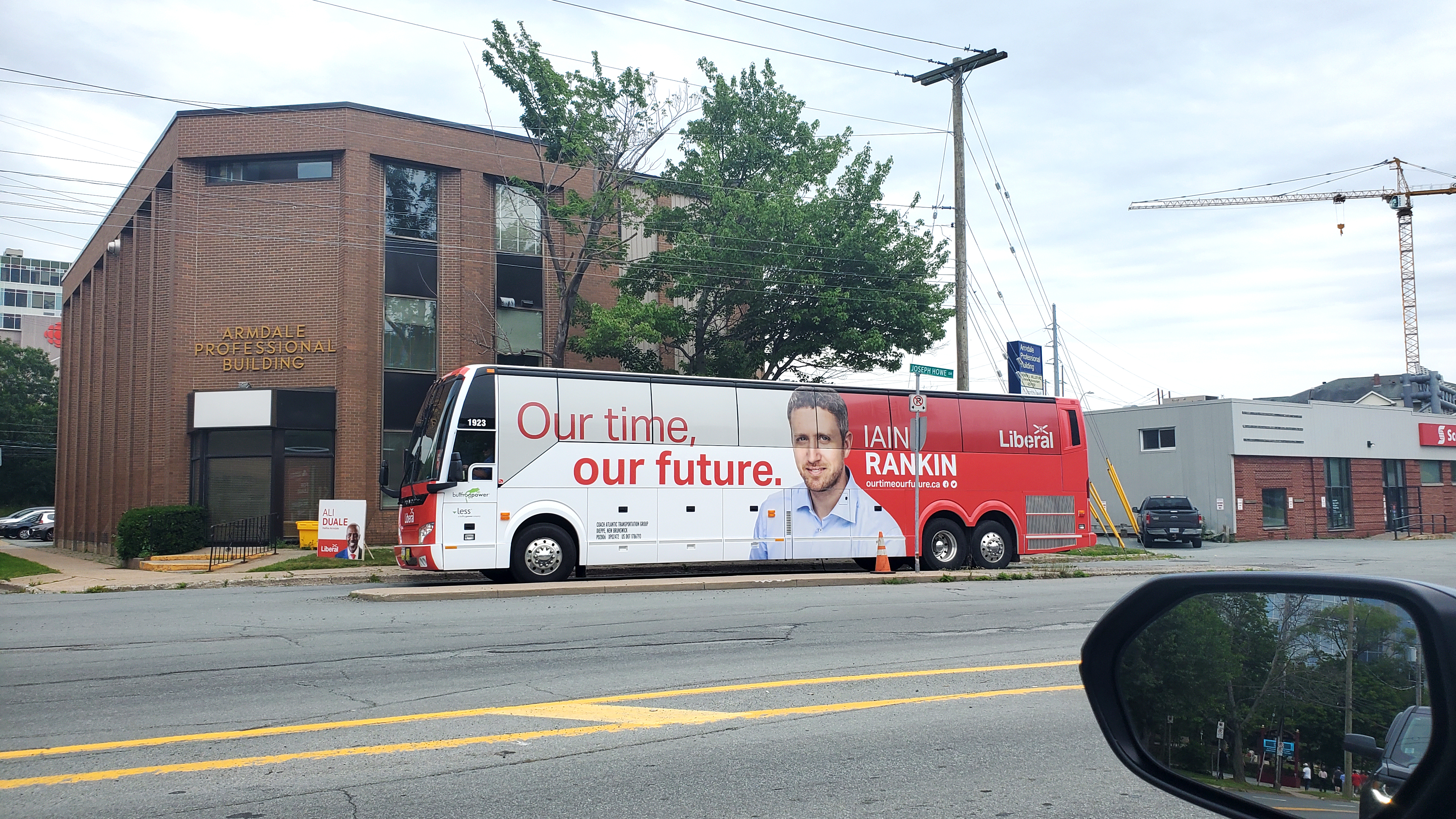
The Liberal Party of Nova Scotia bus in front of Ali Duale's campaign office at Armdale Professional Building (2625 Joseph Howe Drive, Halifax) on July 18, 2021.

Former premier Rodney MacDonald joined Rankin, in Mabou, to announce the creation of a satellite campus in Mabou for the Gaelic College, called Beinn Mhabu. The province invested 1.92 million to renovate St Joseph's convent. It opened in September 2023. Rankin was also responsible for launching a new Forest innovation Centre at the Nova Scotia Community College. The first forestry training facility in the province.

In April 2021, following a spike in COVID-19 cases, Rankin enacted lockdown measures which brought case numbers down, and case numbers remained low for the remainder of his tenure. Nova Scotia maintained the highest vaccination rates in Canada. Rankin launched a plan to add 264 new long-term care beds and replace 1,298 beds at 14 nursing homes and three residential care facilities across the province.

In June 2021, with the Liberal government enjoying a 75% approval rating, Rankin called for an election. While the Liberals focused on their handling of the COVID-19 pandemic, the Progressive Conservatives ran a campaign that was largely focused on health care in Nova Scotia. Despite starting the campaign with a lead of 8 points in the polls, the Progressive Conservatives, led by Tim Houston, won a majority government. This marked the first time since 2006 that the Progressive Conservatives had won an election in Nova Scotia. Rankin claimed full responsibility for the loss. Rankin left office as Premier on August 31, 2021.

=== Post-premiership ===
Rankin thereafter served as Leader of the Opposition. On January 5, 2022, Rankin announced that he will resign as leader of the Nova Scotia Liberal Party once a new leader is chosen. He was succeeded as Liberal leader and Leader of the Opposition by Zach Churchill after the 2022 leadership election.

As of September 22, 2024, Rankin serves as the Official Opposition critic for Environment and Climate Change, Justice, and Gaelic Affairs.

In the 2024 general election, the Liberals lost twelve seats including that of party leader Churchill, as Rankin and Derek Mombourquette were the only Liberal candidates elected.

On December 8, 2025, Rankin returned to leadership, becoming the interim leader of the party.

== Electoral record ==
2024 Nova Scotia general election: Timberlea-Prospect
Party	Candidate	Votes	%	±%
Liberal	Iain Rankin	4,969	54.89	+0.51%
Progressive Conservative	Trish MacDonald	2,890	31.92	+7.57%
New Democratic	Rose Gillam	1,062	11.73	-5.55%
Green	Jane Martheson	132	1.46	-1.17%
Total valid votes		9,016	–	
Total rejected ballots		34	0.38	+0.07
Turnout		9,050	49.71	-5.44
Eligible voters		18,207		
Liberal hold		Swing		-4.04
Source: Elections Nova Scotia

2021 Nova Scotia general election
Party	Candidate	Votes	%	±%
Liberal	Iain Rankin	5,181	54.38	+4.48
Progressive Conservative	Bill Healy	2,320	24.35	+0.64
New Democratic	Raymond Theriault	1,647	17.29	-3.78
Green	Harry Ward	250	2.62	-1.32
Independent	Dawn Edith Penney	90	0.94	
Atlantica	Dessire G. Miari	40	0.42	-0.96
Total valid votes		9,528	99.69	
Total rejected ballots		30	0.31	
Turnout		9,558	55.68	
Eligible voters		17,165		
Liberal hold		Swing		+1.92

2021 Nova Scotia Liberal Party Leadership Election
Candidate	Ballot 1		Ballot 2	
Name	Votes	Points	Votes	Points
Iain Rankin	3,075 39.02%	2,206.00 40.11%	3,988 52.31%	2,882.31 52.41%
Labi Kousoulis	2,904 35.71%	2,023.69 36.79%	3,636 47.69%	2,617.69 47.59%
Randy Delorey	1,895 24.05%	1,270.31 23.10%	Eliminated	
TOTAL	7,881	5,500	7,624	5,500

2017 Nova Scotia general election
Party	Candidate	Votes	%	±%
Liberal	Iain Rankin	4,272	49.90	-2.03
Progressive Conservative	Tim Kohoot	2,030	23.71	+4.85
New Democratic	Linda Moxsom-Skinner	1,804	21.07	-4.83
Green	Kai Trappenberg	337	3.94	+0.44
Atlantica	Matt Mansfield	118	1.38	+1.38
Total valid votes		8,561	100.0	
Total rejected ballots		37	0.43	
Turnout		8,598	53.87	
Eligible voters		15,962		

2013 Nova Scotia general election
Party	Candidate	Votes	%	±%
Liberal	Iain Rankin	4,471	51.93	+33.78
New Democratic	Linda Moxsom-Skinner	2,230	25.90	-44.31
Progressive Conservative	Bruce Pretty	1,608	18.86	+10.17
Green	Thomas Trappenberg	300	3.50	+0.55
