= D. C. McNeil =

Canadian politician

MLA for Halifax St. Margarets
- In office 1967–1970

MLA for Halifax West
- In office 1963–1967

Personal details
- Born: November 7, 1927 Halifax, Nova Scotia
- Died: January 18, 2015 (aged 87) Halifax, Nova Scotia
- Party: Progressive Conservative
- Occupation: businessman

Douglas Charles "Dugger" McNeil (November 7, 1927 – January 18, 2015) was a Canadian politician. He represented the electoral district of Halifax St. Margarets in the Nova Scotia House of Assembly from 1967 to 1970 and Halifax West from 1963 to 1967. He was a member of the Nova Scotia Progressive Conservative Party.

McNeil was born in Halifax, Nova Scotia, and graduated from high school there. He was a businessman, owning a store and restaurant. In 1954, he married Marion Josephine Peckham. McNeil also played ice hockey in the Quebec Senior Hockey League, Pacific Coast Hockey League, Maritime Major Hockey League, and Atlantic Coast Senior League between the years 1948 and 1955. McNeil died after a stroke on January 18, 2015.
