= Fairview-Clayton Park =

Provincial electoral district in Nova Scotia, Canada

Nova Scotia electoral district

Provincial electoral district
- Legislature: Nova Scotia House of Assembly
MLA
Lina Hamid
New Democratic
- District created: 2012
- First contested: 2013
- Last contested: 2024

Demographics
- Electors: 17,380
- Area (km²): 6
- Census division: Halifax Regional Municipality

Fairview-Clayton Park is a provincial electoral district in Nova Scotia, Canada, that elects one member of the Nova Scotia House of Assembly. The riding was created in 2012 with 45 per cent of the former district of Halifax Fairview, 39 per cent of the former district of Halifax Clayton Park and 10 per cent of Halifax Chebucto.

The riding is primarily residential, containing new single-family homes and high-density apartment complexes favoured by people moving into the city for the first time.

== Geography ==
The land area of Fairview-Clayton Park is 6 km^{2} (2.3 sq mi).

== Members of the Legislative Assembly ==
This riding has elected the following members of the Legislative Assembly:

Fairview-Clayton Park
Legislature	Years	Member	Party
Riding created from Halifax Chebucto, Halifax Clayton Park and Halifax Fairview
62nd	2013–2017	Patricia Arab	Liberal
63rd	2017–2021	Patricia Arab	Liberal
64th	2021–2024	Patricia Arab	Liberal
65th	2024–present	Lina Hamid	New Democratic

== Election results ==
=== 2024 ===
2024 Nova Scotia general election
Party	Candidate	Votes	%	±%
New Democratic	Lina Hamid	2,429	38.98	1.87
Progressive Conservative	Nicole Mosher	2,023	32.47	10.12
Liberal	Patricia Arab	1,779	28.55	-9.96
Total		6,231	–	
Total rejected ballots		43		
Turnout		6,281	39.63	
Eligible voters		15,850		
New Democratic gain		Swing		
Source: Elections Nova Scotia

=== 2021 ===
2021 Nova Scotia general election
Party	Candidate	Votes	%	±%	Expenditures
Liberal	Patricia Arab	2,892	38.51	-1.67	$51,400.74
New Democratic	Joanne Hussey	2,787	37.11	+8.00	$56,136.21
Progressive Conservative	Nicole Mosher	1,678	22.34	-3.30	$44,280.70
Green	Sheila Richardson	153	2.04	-3.03	$200.00
Total valid votes/expense limit		7,510	99.55	–	$91,386.96
Total rejected ballots		34	0.45		
Turnout		7,544	47.17		
Eligible voters		15,992			
Liberal hold		Swing		-4.83	
Source: Elections Nova Scotia

=== 2017 ===
2017 provincial election redistributed results
Party	Vote	%
Liberal	2,662	40.18
New Democratic	1,929	29.11
Progressive Conservative	1,699	25.64
Green	336	5.07

2017 Nova Scotia general election
Party	Candidate	Votes	%	±%
Liberal	Patricia Arab	2,925	39.90	-6.73
New Democratic	Joanne Hussey	2,109	28.77	-2.37
Progressive Conservative	Paul Beasant	1,839	25.09	+3.59
Green	Charlene Boyce	376	5.12	+1.34
Total valid votes		7,330	100	
Total rejected ballots		35	0.48	
Turnout		8,793	41.90%	
Eligible voters		20,985		
Liberal hold		Swing		-2.18
Source: Elections Nova Scotia

=== 2013 ===
2013 Nova Scotia general election
Party	Candidate	Votes	%	±%
Liberal	Patricia Arab	3,364	46.43	–
New Democratic	Abad Khan	2,274	31.39	–
Progressive Conservative	Travis Price	1,294	17.86	–
Green	Raland Kinley	177	2.44	–
Independent	Katie Campbell	136	1.88	–
Total		7,245	–	
Source: Elections Nova Scotia

== See also ==
- List of Nova Scotia provincial electoral districts
- Canadian provincial electoral districts
