= Otter Lake Waste Facility =

Waste management facility in Nova Scotia, Canada

Coordinates: 44.617910°N 63.737525°W

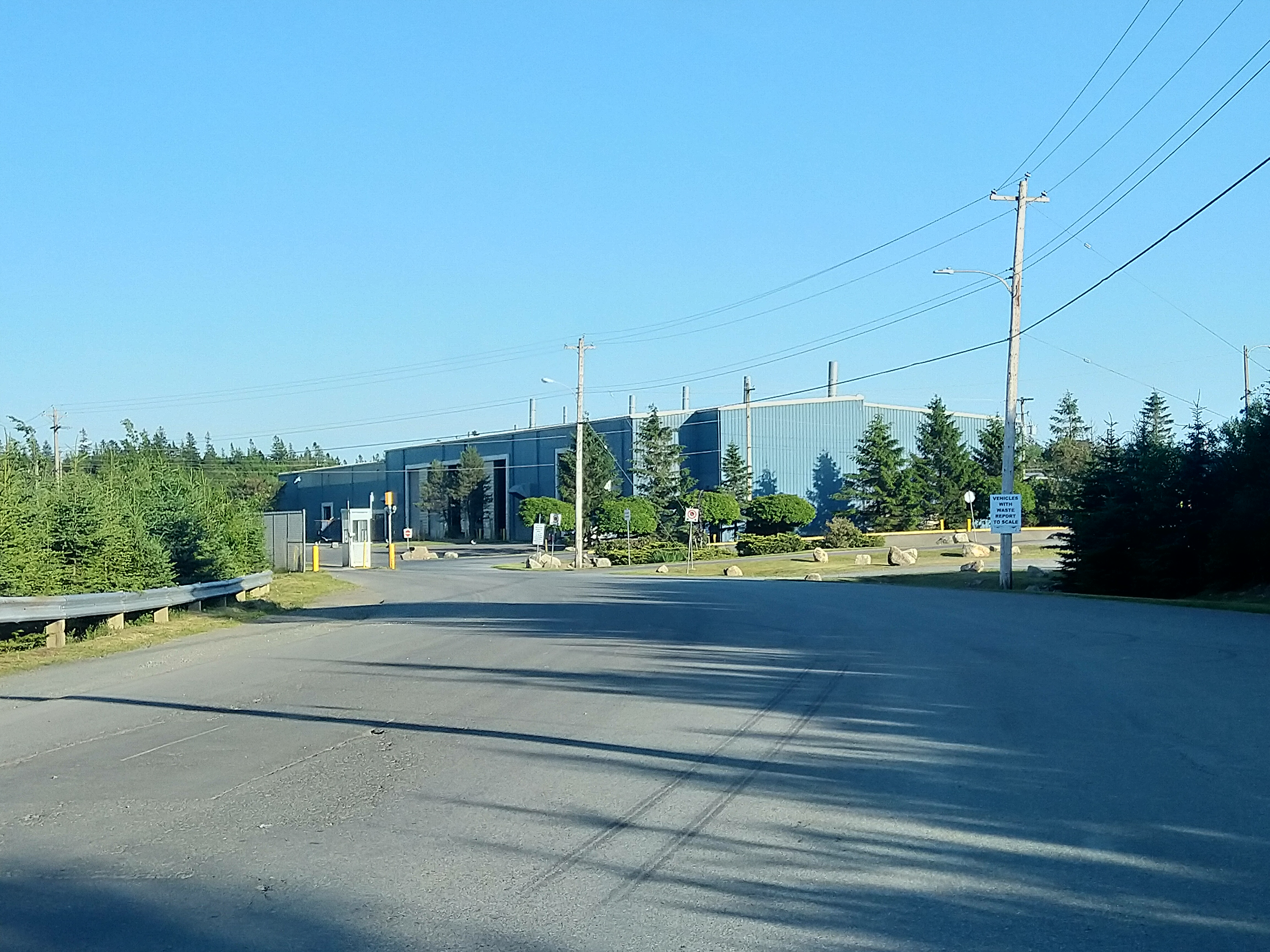
Entrance to the Otter Lake Waste Management Facility

Otter Lake Waste Management Facility is a waste management facility in Otter Lake, Nova Scotia, a community of the Halifax Regional Municipality. The facility was built by the Halifax Regional Municipality in the 1990s to replace an outdated solid waste disposal site in Upper Sackville, Nova Scotia.

== History ==
Built in 1996 after years of planning, the facility was one of the first large projects to be completed in the newly formed Halifax Regional Municipality. The site was designed to last about 66 years and turned in part of the Western Commons Wilderness park area.

In April 2013 NDP Environment Minister Sterling Belliveau, sent a letter to Halifax Regional Council expressing that both the front-end processor (FEP) and the waste stabilization facility (WSF) will continue part of the Department of Energy regulations and a commitment to the local communities. On April 30, Liberal Andrew Younger questioned the Minister's authority to get involved in Halifax Regional Council proposed changes to their waste management strategy.

== Board ==
Under the Agreement the Community Monitoring Committee (CMC) is composed of:

- The Mayor;
- 2 local Councillors;
- 1 other Councillor appointed by Council;
- 2 residents of HRM who do not live in the area, appointed by Council;
- 9 residents of HRM who are elected, with 4 to 6 coming from the local community.·

== Contract ==
A new contract was signed on December 23, 2015, after the December 8th meeting where Councillor Reg Rankin spoke at length in defence of raising the budget for the CMC. However the new contract does not contemplate a larger role, mandate, or further increase in responsibilities from the 1999 agreement signed for Community Monitoring of Solid Waste Facilities. Councillor Bill Karsten, question the need for the increase and asked for a business case to justify the additional cost. Councillor Lorelei Nicoll criticized the job as a “Sweet gig.” February 2016 council approved the funding increase for the committee's total budget, with more than half going towards raising the executive's salary. When retired CAO of the municipality Ken Meech stepped down as the CMC executive director in June 2016, Councillor Reg Rankin took over the position.

== Facility ==
The site sits on 190 acres of land. It plays a major role in Halifax's integrated waste/recourse management strategy which requires several important conditions about materials that can be placed in the site: hazardous waste, recyclable material and unstabilized organic material. The site features a front end processor (FEP) which will sort out unwanted materials. It is located off exit 3 of Nova Scotia Highway 103.
