= Communications Nova Scotia =

Defunct government agency in Canada

Agency overview
- Formed: April 1996
- Dissolved: February 2025
- Jurisdiction: Government of Nova Scotia
- Status: Dissolved
- Employees: 87 (Note: As of 2024, prior to dissolution.)
- Annual budget: CA$6.9 million
- Website: Archived official website

Communications Nova Scotia was a provincial government agency in the Canadian province of Nova Scotia, established in April 1996 to assume the communications functions of the former Department of Supply and Services. It provided centralized, non-partisan communication services to the provincial government of Nova Scotia until its dissolution in February 2025 under Premier Tim Houston.

== History ==
Communications Nova Scotia was established in April 1996 to provide centralized, non-partisan communications to the public from the provincial government of Nova Scotia. This responsibility was previously held by a branch of the Department of Supply and Services, which was broken up into Communications Nova Scotia, the Department of Transportation and Public Works, and the Technology and Science Secretariat. The mandate of Communications Nova Scotia included strategic planning, marketing and advertising, research and evaluation, media relations, graphic design, web strategy and development, photography, videography, writing and editing, and printing. It was also responsible for establishing policies and guidelines surrounding government communications, and was directed to "ensure that government communications are timely, accurate, effective, factual and respectful, objective and non-partisan".

From 2002 to 2012, Communications Nova Scotia had the highest rate of expansion of any provincial government department, with its budget tripling from CA$3 million to $9 million, and total staff growing from 89 to 125 people. The associate deputy minister for the agency affirmed that the budgetary increases reflected its growing role, noting that part of the increase was attributed to a $3.2 million program transferred to it from the Department of Economic Development. Andrew Younger, the Liberal critic for the agency, stated that it "needs a complete overhaul"; while Chris d'Entremont, the Progressive Conservative house leader, argued that Communications Nova Scotia was no longer impartial and was "[running] the political lines of the government in power".

During the COVID-19 pandemic, Communications Nova Scotia played a key role in coordinating news conferences with the Premier and Chief Medical Officer of Health Robert Strang, as well as the dissemination of information relating to vaccines and public health measures. In March 2022, the agency's budget was reduced from $8.2 million to $6.8 million, resulting in 16 employees being laid off and an additional 12 transferred to other departments.

After nearly 30 years of operation, Communications Nova Scotia was dissolved under Premier Tim Houston in February 2025. As of 2024, the agency had a budget of $6.9 million and employed 87 people; most of Communications Nova Scotia's staff were transferred to other departments after it was dissolved. The Nova Scotia NDP leader Claudia Chender stated that the elimination of the agency would have an adverse impact on the public, noting that "it appears that Tim Houston wants to have less scrutiny than he already has." Derek Mombourquette, the interim leader of the Nova Scotia Liberal Party, also expressed concern, stating that "now you're into a situation where all of this is going to be pulled into departments and ultimately the decisions are going to be made by the premier's office". The Houston government affirmed that the decision aligned with communications practices in other jurisdictions, and was intended to provide a more efficient service. The minister responsible for Communications Nova Scotia, Leah Martin, stated that the agency needed to be restructured in response to the rapidly changing media landscape, saying in a statement that "the Communications Nova Scotia model hasn't changed in nearly a decade". The Canadian Taxpayers Federation said in a news release that the decision was "a positive first step in streamlining government operations and ensuring taxpayers get better value for their money".

Following the dissolution of Communications Nova Scotia, provincial communications staff were reassigned to their respective departments, working as part of an Executive Council office instead of an independent agency.

== See also ==
- Pomegranate (phone) – 2008 marketing initiative by Communications Nova Scotia
