= Timberlea-Prospect =

Provincial electoral district in Nova Scotia, Canada

Nova Scotia electoral district

Provincial electoral district
- Legislature: Nova Scotia House of Assembly
MLA
Iain Rankin
Liberal
- District created: 1967
- First contested: 1967
- Last contested: 2024

Demographics
- Population (2011): 22,278
- Electors: 14,854
- Area (km²): 342
- Pop. density (per km²): 65.1
- Census division: Halifax RM

Timberlea—Prospect is a provincial electoral district in Nova Scotia, Canada, that elects one member of the Nova Scotia House of Assembly. Its Member of the Legislative Assembly (MLA) since 2013 has been Iain Rankin of the Nova Scotia Liberal Party.

The district was created in 1967 from the former electoral district of Halifax West, under the name Halifax-St. Margaret's. Upon the recommendations of the 1992 Electoral Boundaries Commission report, it was renamed Timberlea-Prospect. At this same time, it lost the St. Margaret's Bay area to Chester-St. Margaret's, the Hammonds Plains, Lucasville, and Pockwock Road area to Sackville-Beaver Bank, and the Bedford area to Bedford-Fall River. In 2003, it lost the Bayside and West Dover areas to Chester-St. Margaret's. In 2013, on the recommendations of the 2012 Electoral Boundaries Commission, it lost the Stillwater Lake area to Hammonds Plains-Lucasville and a small number of streets in the Williamswood and Harrietsfield areas to Halifax Atlantic. It gained the Susies Lake and Quarrie Lake areas from Halifax Clayton Park.

== Geography ==
Timberlea-Prospect has 342 km^{2} (132 sq mi) of land area.

== Members of the Legislative Assembly ==
This riding has elected the following members of the Legislative Assembly:

Legislature	Years	Member	Party
Halifax St. Margarets; Riding created from Halifax West
49th	1967–1970	D. C. McNeil	Progressive Conservative
50th	1970–1974	Leonard L. Pace	Liberal
51st	1974–1978	Leonard L. Pace	Liberal
52nd	1978–1981	Jerry Lawrence	Progressive Conservative
53rd	1981–1984	Jerry Lawrence	Progressive Conservative
54th	1984–1988	Jerry Lawrence	Progressive Conservative
55th	1988–1993	Jerry Lawrence	Progressive Conservative
Timberlea-Prospect
56th	1993–1998	Bruce Holland	Liberal
57th	1998–1999	Bill Estabrooks	New Democratic
58th	1999–2003	Bill Estabrooks	New Democratic
59th	2003–2005	Bill Estabrooks	New Democratic
60th	2006–2009	Bill Estabrooks	New Democratic
61st	2009–2013	Bill Estabrooks	New Democratic
62nd	2013–2017	Iain Rankin	Liberal
63rd	2017–2021	Iain Rankin	Liberal
64th	2021–2024	Iain Rankin	Liberal
65th	2024–present	Iain Rankin	Liberal

== Election results ==
=== 2024 ===
2024 Nova Scotia general election
Party	Candidate	Votes	%	±%
Liberal	Iain Rankin	4,969	54.89	+0.51%
Progressive Conservative	Trish MacDonald	2,890	31.92	+7.57%
New Democratic	Rose Gillam	1,062	11.73	-5.55%
Green	Jane Martheson	132	1.46	-1.17%
Total valid votes		9,016	–	
Total rejected ballots		34	0.38	+0.07
Turnout		9,050	49.71	-5.44
Eligible voters		18,207		
Liberal hold		Swing		-4.04
Source: Elections Nova Scotia

=== 2021 ===
2021 Nova Scotia general election
Party	Candidate	Votes	%	±%	Expenditures
Liberal	Iain Rankin	5,181	54.38	+4.98	$43,327.12
Progressive Conservative	Bill Healy	2,320	24.35	+0.78	$30,730.87
New Democratic	Raymond Theriault	1,647	17.29	-4.45	$27,578.78
Green	Harry Ward	250	2.62	-1.37	$200.00
Independent	Dawn Edith Penney	90	0.94		$243.25
Atlantica	Dessire G. Miari	40	0.42	-0.89	$200.00
Total valid votes/expense limit		9,528	99.69	–	$98,060.31
Total rejected ballots		30	0.31		
Turnout		9,558	55.15		
Eligible voters		17,330			
Liberal hold		Swing		+2.10	
Source: Elections Nova Scotia

=== 2017 ===
2017 provincial election redistributed results
Party	Vote	%
Liberal	4,450	49.40
Progressive Conservative	2,123	23.57
New Democratic	1,958	21.73
Green	360	4.00
Atlantica	118	1.31

2017 Nova Scotia general election
Party	Candidate	Votes	%	±%
Liberal	Iain Rankin	4,272	49.90	-2.03
Progressive Conservative	Tim Kohoot	2,030	23.71	+4.85
New Democratic	Linda Moxsom-Skinner	1,804	21.07	-4.83
Green	Kai Trappenberg	337	3.94	+0.44
Atlantica	Matt Mansfield	118	1.38	+1.38
Total valid votes		8,561	100.0	
Total rejected ballots		37	0.43	
Turnout		8,598	53.87	
Eligible voters		15,962		
Liberal hold		Swing		+0.31
Source: Elections Nova Scotia

=== 2013 ===
2013 Nova Scotia general election
Party	Candidate	Votes	%	±%
Liberal	Iain Rankin	4,492	52.59%	35.02%
New Democratic	Linda Moxsom-Skinner	2,168	25.38%	-45.31%
Progressive Conservative	Bruce R. Pretty	1,588	18.59%	9.49%
Green	Thomas Trappenberg	293	3.43%	0.81%
Total		8,541	–	
Source(s) Source: Nova Scotia Legislature (2024). "Electoral History for Timberlea-Prospect" (PDF). nslegislature.ca. Nova Scotia, Chief Electoral Officer (2013). 39th Provincial General Election, October 8, 2013: Volume 1 – Statement of Votes & Statistics (PDF) (Report). Elections Nova Scotia. Archived from the original (PDF) on 10 April 2018.

=== 2009 ===
2009 Nova Scotia general election
Party	Candidate	Votes	%	±%
New Democratic	Bill Estabrooks	6,174	70.70%	7.55%
Liberal	Lisa Mullin	1,535	17.58%	7.47%
Progressive Conservative	Gina Byrne	795	9.10%	-15.06%
Green	Thomas Trappenberg	229	2.62%	0.04%
Total		8,733	–	
Source(s) Source: Nova Scotia Legislature (2024). "Electoral History for Timberlea-Prospect" (PDF). nslegislature.ca.

=== 2006 ===
2006 Nova Scotia general election
Party	Candidate	Votes	%	±%
New Democratic	Bill Estabrooks	5,316	63.15%	3.14%
Progressive Conservative	Juanita Cirtwill	2,034	24.16%	5.92%
Liberal	Lisa Mullin	851	10.11%	-11.63%
Green	Thomas Trappenberg	217	2.58%	–
Total		8,418	–	
Source(s) Source: Nova Scotia Legislature (2024). "Electoral History for Timberlea-Prospect" (PDF). nslegislature.ca.

=== 2003 ===
2003 Nova Scotia general election
Party	Candidate	Votes	%	±%
New Democratic	Bill Estabrooks	5,049	60.01%	13.18%
Liberal	Bruce Holland	1,829	21.74%	-1.60%
Progressive Conservative	Barry Fraser	1,535	18.25%	-9.71%
Total		8,413	–	
Source(s) Source: Nova Scotia Legislature (2024). "Electoral History for Timberlea-Prospect" (PDF). nslegislature.ca.

=== 1999 ===
1999 Nova Scotia general election
Party	Candidate	Votes	%	±%
New Democratic	Bill Estabrooks	4,356	46.83%	-1.16%
Progressive Conservative	Ken Fralick	2,600	27.95%	9.29%
Liberal	Vicki Brown	2,171	23.34%	-10.00%
Nova Scotia Party	Ken Bumstead	174	1.87%	–
Total		9,301	–	
Source(s) Source: Nova Scotia Legislature (2024). "Electoral History for Timberlea-Prospect" (PDF). nslegislature.ca. Nova Scotia, Chief Electoral Officer (1999). Returns of the General Election for the House of Assembly, Thirty-Fifth General Election (Report). Elections Nova Scotia.

=== 1998 ===
1998 Nova Scotia general election
Party	Candidate	Votes	%	±%
New Democratic	Bill Estabrooks	4,762	47.99%	17.15%
Liberal	Bruce Holland	3,308	33.34%	-5.28%
Progressive Conservative	Tom Robertson	1,852	18.67%	-11.87%
Total		9,922	–	
Source(s) Source: Nova Scotia Legislature (2024). "Electoral History for Timberlea-Prospect" (PDF). nslegislature.ca.

=== 1993 ===
1993 Nova Scotia general election
Party	Candidate	Votes	%	±%
Liberal	Bruce Holland	3,470	38.62%	5.49%
New Democratic	Bill Estabrooks	2,772	30.85%	1.29%
Progressive Conservative	Debra Ann (Debi) Forsyth-Smith	2,744	30.54%	-6.78%
Total		8,986	–	
Source(s) Source: Nova Scotia Legislature (2024). "Electoral History for Timberlea-Prospect" (PDF). nslegislature.ca. Nova Scotia, Chief Electoral Officer (1993). Returns of the General Election for the House of Assembly, Thirty-Third General Election (PDF) (Report). Queen's Printer. Archived from the original (PDF) on 18 June 2018.

=== 1988 ===
1988 Nova Scotia general election: Halifax St. Margarets
Party	Candidate	Votes	%	±%
Progressive Conservative	Jerry Lawrence	4,574	37.31%	-20.08%
Liberal	Kevin Burke	4,061	33.13%	15.73%
New Democratic	Bill Estabrooks	3,623	29.56%	4.35%
Total		12,258	–	
Source(s) Source: Nova Scotia Legislature (2024). "Electoral History for Halifax St. Margaret's" (PDF). nslegislature.ca. Nova Scotia, Chief Electoral Officer (1988). Returns of the General Election for the House of Assembly, Thirty-Second General Election (PDF) (Report). Queen's Printer. Archived from the original (PDF) on 7 July 2018.

=== 1984 ===
1984 Nova Scotia general election: Halifax St. Margarets
Party	Candidate	Votes	%	±%
Progressive Conservative	Jerry Lawrence	5,141	57.39%	7.13%
New Democratic	Lillian Viau	2,258	25.21%	2.53%
Liberal	Michael N. Kelly	1,559	17.40%	-9.66%
Total		8,958	–	
Source(s) Source: Nova Scotia Legislature (2024). "Electoral History for Halifax St. Margaret's" (PDF). nslegislature.ca. Nova Scotia, Chief Electoral Officer (1984). Returns of the General Election for the House of Assembly, Thirty-First General Election (PDF) (Report). Queen's Printer. Archived from the original (PDF) on 31 July 2017.

=== 1981 ===
1981 Nova Scotia general election: Halifax St. Margarets
Party	Candidate	Votes	%	±%
Progressive Conservative	Jerry Lawrence	4,860	50.26%	-4.12%
Liberal	Helena Poirier	2,617	27.06%	-5.39%
New Democratic	Lillian Viau	2,193	22.68%	9.51%
Total		9,670	–	
Source(s) Source: Nova Scotia Legislature (2024). "Electoral History for Halifax St. Margaret's" (PDF). nslegislature.ca. Nova Scotia, Chief Electoral Officer (1981). Returns of the General Election for the House of Assembly, Thirtieth General Election (PDF) (Report). Queen's Printer. Archived from the original (PDF) on 31 July 2017.

=== 1978 ===
1978 Nova Scotia general election: Halifax St. Margarets
Party	Candidate	Votes	%	±%
Progressive Conservative	Jerry Lawrence	5,277	54.38%	14.14%
Liberal	Terry Tingley	3,149	32.45%	-15.42%
New Democratic	Garry Richard Craig	1,278	13.17%	1.28%
Total		9,704	–	
Source(s) Source: Nova Scotia Legislature (2024). "Electoral History for Halifax St. Margaret's" (PDF). nslegislature.ca. Nova Scotia, Chief Electoral Officer (1978). Returns of the General Election for the House of Assembly, Twenty-Ninth General Election (PDF) (Report). Queen's Printer. Archived from the original (PDF) on 18 June 2018.

=== 1974 ===
1974 Nova Scotia general election: Halifax St. Margarets
Party	Candidate	Votes	%	±%
Liberal	Leonard L. Pace	7,238	47.87%	-3.82%
Progressive Conservative	George C. Piercey	6,084	40.24%	0.50%
New Democratic	Richard Rogers	1,798	11.89%	3.32%
Total		15,120	–	
Source(s) Source: Nova Scotia Legislature (2024). "Electoral History for Halifax St. Margaret's" (PDF). nslegislature.ca. Nova Scotia, Chief Electoral Officer (1974). Returns of the General Election for the House of Assembly, Twenty-Eighth General Election (PDF) (Report). Queen's Printer. Archived from the original (PDF) on 18 June 2018.

=== 1970 ===
1970 Nova Scotia general election: Halifax St. Margarets
Party	Candidate	Votes	%	±%
Liberal	Leonard L. Pace	6,152	51.69%	10.12%
Progressive Conservative	D. C. McNeil	4,729	39.74%	-13.74%
New Democratic	Keith B. Jobson	1,020	8.57%	3.62%
Total		11,901	–	
Source(s) Source: Nova Scotia Legislature (2024). "Electoral History for Halifax St. Margaret's" (PDF). nslegislature.ca. Nova Scotia, Legislative Assembly (1970). Returns of the General Election for the House of Assembly, 1970 (PDF) (Report). Queen's Printer. Archived from the original (PDF) on 25 July 2018.

=== 1967 ===
1967 Nova Scotia general election: Halifax St. Margarets
Party	Candidate	Votes	%	±%
Progressive Conservative	D. C. McNeil	5,030	53.48%	–
Liberal	Alex McKinnon	3,910	41.57%	–
New Democratic	Peggy Prowse	466	4.95%	–
Total		9,406	–	
Source(s) Source: Nova Scotia Legislature (2024). "Electoral History for Halifax St. Margaret's" (PDF). nslegislature.ca. Nova Scotia Legislature (1967). Returns of the General Election for the House of Assembly (PDF) (Report). Queen's Printer. Archived from the original (PDF) on 25 July 2018.

== See also ==
- List of Nova Scotia provincial electoral districts
- Canadian provincial electoral districts
