= Nova Scotia Liberal Party =

Provincial political party in Canada

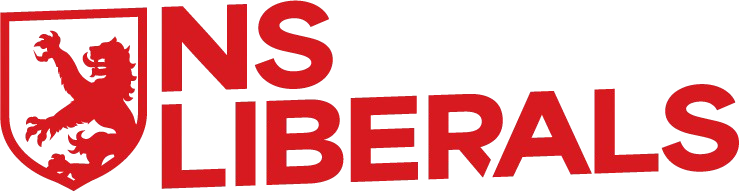
- Leader: Becky Druhan
- President: Margaret Miller
- Secretary: David Mackeigan
- Founded: 1883; 143 years ago
- Headquarters: 5151 George Street; Suite 1400; Halifax, Nova Scotia; B3J 2T3
- Youth wing: Nova Scotia Young Liberals
- Membership (2021): ▲ ~16,000
- Ideology: Liberalism
- Political position: Centre
- National affiliation: Liberal Party of Canada
- Colours: Red
- Seats in House of Assembly: 3 / 56

Website
- Official website

The Nova Scotia Liberal Party (officially the Liberal Association of Nova Scotia) is a centrist provincial political party in Nova Scotia, Canada and the provincial section of the Liberal Party of Canada. The party currently holds three seats in the Legislature, under the interim leadership of Iain Rankin. The party was in power most recently from the 2013 election until the 2021 election.

The party is the only party in the province with uninterrupted presence in the legislature since confederation. It has formed the Government of Nova Scotia for 90 of the approximately 160 years since it became a province of Canada. It won 25 of the province's 42 elections. However, the Liberal party was supplanted by the Nova Scotia New Democratic Party as the official opposition for three consecutive elections in 1999, 2003 and 2006, and again in the most recent election in 2024.

== Origins ==
The Nova Scotia Liberal Party produced 14 of the province's 29 premiers, including:

- William Stevens Fielding - after a 12 year tenure as Premier (1884-96), he went on to become the longest serving federal finance minister
- George Henry Murray - whose premiership between 1896 and 1923 was the longest unbroken tenure for a head of government in Canadian history
- Angus L. MacDonald - the only premier to have occupied the office over two non-consecutive terms; his tenure broken by a stint as the naval services minister in MacKenzie King's wartime cabinet.

The party is descended from the pre-Confederation Reformers in Nova Scotia who coalesced around Joseph Howe demanding the institution of responsible government. The Liberals (Reformers) formed several governments in the colony between 1848 and 1867.

The party split during the debate on Confederation, with Howe and most other Liberals forming an Anti-Confederation Party, while supporters of confederation joined Tory Charles Tupper's Confederation Party. Howe, himself, initially opposed Confederation, but accepted it as a reality after initial attempts to scuttle it failed.

In 1868, Howe joined the pro-Confederation forces, serving for a time in the federal Cabinet of Sir John A. Macdonald.

The Anti-Confederation Party took most of Nova Scotia's seats in the House of Commons of Canada in 1867, as well as forming the government of the new province under William Annand. The new, post-1867 Liberal Party was organised by Annand and his anti-Confederate forces, while the Conservative Party was organised by Tupper and supporters of Sir John A. Macdonald's coalition in the province.

Prior to 1956, the Nova Scotia Liberal Party had ruled the province for 76 of its 89 years, most of that time with fewer than five opposition members. It had also ruled prior to confederation, and was responsible for bringing the first responsible government to North America. From 1882 to 1925, the Liberals held power for an unbroken 43 years; this made them the second longest serving political dynasty in Canadian history, behind the Alberta PCs.

== Recent history ==
From 1956, the Tories gained significant ground with Robert Stanfield's reformation of the "Progressive Conservatives", and have successfully challenged the Liberals for control of the government. The Liberals faltered in the province at the beginning of the 21st century, and for a time were the third-largest party in the House of Assembly, behind the Tories and the Nova Scotia New Democratic Party. After the Nova Scotia Liberal Party's dismal performance in the 2006 election (and failing to win his own seat), leader Francis MacKenzie announced his resignation. He was succeeded by Stephen McNeil. In the 2009 election, the Liberals moved out of third-party status and formed the official opposition once again. In the 2013 election, the Liberals won a majority government, their first since the 1993 election under John Savage, and took office for the first time in 14 years. Under McNeil, a self-described fiscal conservative, the party pushed for balanced provincial budgets and took a firm stance against public sector unions.

In the 2009 election, Stephen McNeil led the Liberals to Official Opposition status, winning 11 seats. In the 2013 election, the McNeil Liberals won a majority government, defeating the NDP government of Darrell Dexter. In the 2017 election, the McNeil Liberals retained a reduced majority of 27 seats in the legislature. On August 6, 2020, McNeil announced he would step down as party leader and that he would continue to act as premier and as the party's leader until a replacement was found. On February 23, 2021, Iain Rankin became the 29th Premier of Nova Scotia, replacing McNeil, following a leadership election. Rankin called a snap election for August 17, 2021, which his Liberal Party lost. Rankin was personally re-elected in Timberlea-Prospect. In the wake of the defeat, Rankin stepped down as leader.

Yarmouth MLA Zach Churchill was elected leader of the Liberal Party in the 2022 leadership election. In the 2024 election, the Liberals suffered their worst defeat in history, winning only two seats total. Leader Zach Churchill lost his own seat, and resigned from his position as leader two weeks later, and Derek Mombourquette became the interim leader. In December 2025, former leader Rankin once again became party leader, taking over the interim role from Mombourquette. Becky Druhan was elected the party's first female leader in November.

== Current elected politicians ==
Name	Riding	Year elected
Becky Druhan	Lunenburg West	2021
Derek Mombourquette	Sydney-Membertou	2015
Iain Rankin	Timberlea-Prospect	2013

== Party leaders ==
- James B. Uniacke (1840–1854)
- William Young (1854–1860)
- Joseph Howe (1860–1864)
- Adams G. Archibald (1864–1867)
- William Annand (1867–1875)
- Philip Carteret Hill (1875–1878)
- William F. McCurdy (1878–1882) (house leader)
- William Thomas Pipes (1882–1884)
- William Stevens Fielding (1884–1896)
- George Henry Murray (1896–1923)
- Ernest Howard Armstrong (1923–1925)
- William Chisholm (1925–1930)
- Angus L. Macdonald (1930–1940)
- A.S. MacMillan (1940–1945)
- Angus L. Macdonald (1945–1954)
- Harold Connolly (1954) (interim)
- Henry Hicks (1954–1961)
- Earl W. Urquhart (1961–1965) (house leader 1961–1962)
- Gerald Regan (1965–1980)
- Benoit Comeau (1980) (interim)
- Sandy Cameron (1980–1985)
- Vince MacLean (1985)
- Bill Gillis (1985–1986) (interim)
- Vince MacLean (1986–1992)
- John Savage (1992–1997)
- Russell MacLellan (1997–2000)
- Wayne Gaudet (2000–2002) (interim)
- Danny Graham (2002–2004)
- Wayne Gaudet (2004) (interim)
- Francis MacKenzie (2004–2006)
- Michel Samson (2006–2007) (interim)
- Stephen McNeil (2007–2021)
- Iain Rankin (2021–2022)
- Zach Churchill (2022–2024)
- Derek Mombourquette (2024–2025) (interim)
- Iain Rankin (2025–2026) (interim)
- Becky Druhan (2026–present)

== Electoral performance ==
Election	Leader	Votes	%	Seats	+/–	Position	Status
1867	William Annand		58.6	36 / 38	▲21	▲1st	Majority
1871	William Annand		52.2	24 / 38	▼12	1st	Majority
1874	Philip Carteret Hill		55.0	22 / 38	▼2	1st	Majority
1878	Philip Carteret Hill		45.1	6 / 38	▼16	▼2nd	Opposition
1882	None		51.8	24 / 38	▲18	▲1st	Majority
1886	William Stevens Fielding		54.7	28 / 38	▲4	1st	Majority
1890	William Stevens Fielding		52.2	29 / 38	▲1	1st	Majority
1894	William Stevens Fielding		51.9	25 / 38	▼4	1st	Majority
1897	George Henry Murray		55.0	34 / 38	▲9	1st	Majority
1901	George Henry Murray		56.7	36 / 38	▲2	1st	Majority
1906	George Henry Murray		53.2	32 / 38	▼4	1st	Majority
1911	George Henry Murray		51.1	26 / 38	▼10	1st	Majority
1916	George Henry Murray		50.4	31 / 43	▲5	1st	Majority
1920	George Henry Murray		44.4	29 / 43	▼2	1st	Majority
1925	Ernest Howard Armstrong		36.3	3 / 43	▼26	▼2nd	Opposition
1928	William Chisholm		47.2	18 / 43	▲15	2nd	Opposition
1933	Angus Lewis Macdonald		52.6	22 / 30	▲4	▲1st	Majority
1937	Angus Lewis Macdonald		51.0	25 / 30	▲3	1st	Majority
1941	Alexander Stirling MacMillan		52.6	22 / 30	▼3	1st	Majority
1945	Angus Lewis Macdonald		52.7	28 / 30	▲6	1st	Majority
1949	Angus Lewis Macdonald		51.0	27 / 37	▼1	1st	Majority
1953	Angus Lewis Macdonald		49.0	22 / 37	▼5	1st	Majority
1956	Henry Hicks	159,666	48.2	18 / 43	▼4	▼2nd	Opposition
1960	Henry Hicks	147,951	42.6	15 / 43	▼3	2nd	Opposition
1963	Earl Wallace Urquhart	134,873	39.7	4 / 43	▼11	2nd	Opposition
1967	Gerald Regan	142,945	41.8	6 / 46	▲2	2nd	Opposition
1970	Gerald Regan	174,943	46.1	23 / 46	▲17	▲1st	Minority
1974	Gerald Regan	206,648	47.9	31 / 46	▲8	1st	Majority
1978	Gerald Regan	175,218	39.4	17 / 52	▼14	▼2nd	Opposition
1981	Sandy Cameron	139,604	33.2	13 / 52	▼4	2nd	Opposition
1984	Sandy Cameron	129,310	31.3	6 / 52	▼7	2nd	Opposition
1988	Vince MacLean	186,007	39.6	21 / 52	▲15	2nd	Opposition
1993	John Savage	243,298	49.7	40 / 52	▲19	▲1st	Majority
1998	Russell MacLellan	158,620	35.3	19 / 52	▼21	1st	Minority
1999	Russell MacLellan	128,795	29.8	11 / 52	▼8	▼3rd	Third party
2003	Danny Graham	128,417	31.5	12 / 52	▲1	3rd	Third party
2006	Francis MacKenzie	94,872	23.4	9 / 52	▼3	3rd	Third party
2009	Stephen McNeil	112,160	27.2	11 / 52	▲2	▲2nd	Opposition
2013	Stephen McNeil	190,112	45.7	33 / 51	▲22	▲1st	Majority
2017	Stephen McNeil	157,541	39.5	27 / 51	▼6	1st	Majority
2021	Iain Rankin	155,026	36.7	17 / 55	▼10	▼2nd	Opposition
2024	Zach Churchill	81,137	22.87	2 / 55	▼14	▼3rd	Third party

== See also ==
- List of Nova Scotia political parties
- List of Nova Scotia premiers
- Nova Scotia Liberal Party leadership elections
