= 52nd General Assembly of Nova Scotia =

Government of Nova Scotia, 1978 to 1981

- Majority parliament
- 7 December 1978 – 28 August 1981

Parliament leaders
- Premier: John Buchanan; October 5, 1978
- Leader of the Opposition: Gerald Regan; October 5, 1978 – January 1, 1980
- Benoit Comeau; January 1, 1980 – June 8, 1980
- A.M. (Sandy) Cameron; June 8, 1980

Party caucuses
- Government: Progressive Conservative Party
- Opposition: Liberal Party
- Recognized: New Democratic Party

House of Assembly
- Speaker of the House: Ron Russell; December 7, 1978 – July 8, 1980
- Art Donahoe; February 19, 1981
- Members: 52 MLA seats

Sovereign
- Monarch: Elizabeth II; February 6, 1952
- Lieutenant Governor: Clarence Gosse; October 1, 1973 – December 23, 1978
- John Elvin Shaffner; December 23, 1978

Sessions
- 1st session December 7, 1978 – December 28, 1979
- 2nd session February 28, 1980 – February 19, 1981
- 3rd session February 19, 1981 – August 28, 1981
← 51st	→ 53rd

The 52nd General Assembly of Nova Scotia represented Nova Scotia between December 7, 1978 and August 28, 1981.

== Division of seats ==
There were 52 members of the General Assembly, elected in the 1978 Nova Scotia general election.

Leader	Party	# of Seats
Gerald Regan	Liberal	17
John Buchanan	Progressive Conservative	31
Jeremy Akerman	NDP	4
Total		52

== List of members ==
Riding	Name	Party	First elected / previously elected	Position
Annapolis East	Gerry Sheehy	Progressive Conservative	1970	
Annapolis West	Greg Kerr	Progressive Conservative	1978	
Antigonish	J. William Gillis	Liberal	1970	
Bedford - Musquodoboit Valley	Ken Streatch	Progressive Conservative	1978	
Cape Breton South	Vincent MacLean	Liberal	1974	
Cape Breton Centre	James 'Buddy' MacEachern	NDP	1974	
Cape Breton North	Len J. Arsenault	NDP	1978	
Cape Breton Nova	Paul MacEwan	NDP	1970	
Cape Breton Nova	Paul MacEwan	Independent	1970	
Cape Breton East	Jeremy Akerman	NDP	1970	
Cape Breton East	Donnie MacLeod (1980)	Progressive Conservative	1980	
Cape Breton West	David N. Muise	Liberal	1978	
Cape Breton The Lakes	Ossie Fraser	Liberal	1976	
Clare	Benoit Comeau	Liberal	1967	
Colchester North	Bill Campbell	Progressive Conservative	1978	
Colchester South	R. Colin Stewart	Progressive Conservative	1978	
Cole Harbour	David Nantes	Progressive Conservative	1978	
Cumberland East	Roger S. Bacon	Progressive Conservative	1970	
Cumberland West	D. L. George Henley	Progressive Conservative	1963	
Cumberland Centre	Guy A. C. Brown	Liberal	1974	
Dartmouth East	Richard L. Weldon	Progressive Conservative	1978	
Dartmouth North	Laird Stirling	Progressive Conservative	1978	
Dartmouth South	Roland J. Thornhill	Progressive Conservative	1974	
Digby	Joseph H. Casey	Liberal	1970	
Guysborough	A. M. "Sandy" Cameron	Liberal	1973	
Halifax Atlantic	John Buchanan	Progressive Conservative	1967	Premier
Halifax Bedford Basin	Joel Matheson	Progressive Conservative	1978	
Halifax Cornwallis	Terry Donahoe	Progressive Conservative	1978	
Halifax Citadel	Arthur R. Donahoe	Progressive Conservative	1978	
Halifax Chebucto	Walter Fitzgerald	Liberal	1974	
Halifax Eastern Shore	Tom McInnis	Progressive Conservative	1978	
Halifax Needham	Gerald Regan	Liberal	1967	
Halifax Needham	Edmund L. Morris (1980)	Progressive Conservative	1980	
Halifax St. Margarets	Gerald A.(Jerry) Lawrence	Progressive Conservative	1978	
Hants East	G. Patrick Hunt	Progressive Conservative	1978	
Hants West	Ron Russell	Progressive Conservative	1978	
Inverness	Bill MacEachern	Liberal	1974	
Inverness	John Archie MacKenzie	Liberal	1970	
Kings North	Edward Twohig	Progressive Conservative	1978	
Kings South	Harry How	Progressive Conservative	1970	
Kings West	George Moody	Progressive Conservative	1978	
Lunenburg Centre	Bruce Cochran	Progressive Conservative	1974	
Lunenburg East	Ron Barkhouse	Progressive Conservative	1974	
Lunenburg West	Mel Pickings	Progressive Conservative	1978	
Pictou East	Donald W. Cameron	Progressive Conservative	1974	
Pictou West	Donald P. McInnes	Progressive Conservative	1978	
Pictou Centre	Jack MacIsaac	Progressive Conservative	1977	
Queens	John Leefe	Progressive Conservative	1978	
Richmond	Gaston LeBlanc	Liberal	1974	
Richmond	John E. LeBrun (1980)	Liberal	1980	
Sackville	Malcolm A. MacKay	Progressive Conservative	1978	
Shelburne	Harold Huskilson	Liberal	1970	
Truro-Bible Hill	Ron Giffin	Progressive Conservative	1978	
Victoria	Peter John Nicholson	Liberal	1978	
Victoria	Fisher Hudson (1980)	Progressive Conservative	1967, 1980	
Yarmouth	Fraser Mooney	Liberal	1970	
Yarmouth	Hugh Tinkham	Liberal	1974	

== Former members of the 52nd General Assembly ==
Name	Party	Electoral District	Cause of departure	Succeeded by	Elected
Gerald Regan	Liberal	Halifax Needham	elected to federal seat	Edmund L. Morris, PC	May 6, 1980
Gaston T. LeBlanc	Liberal	Richmond	death	John E. LeBrun, Liberal	May 6, 1980
Peter John Nicholson	Liberal	Victoria	resigned	Fisher Hudson, PC	May 6, 1980
Jeremy Akerman	NDP	Cape Breton East	resigned	Donnie MacLeod, PC	December 2, 1980

Preceded by 51st General Assembly of Nova Scotia	General Assemblies of Nova Scotia; 1978–1981	Succeeded by 53rd General Assembly of Nova Scotia
