= 51st General Assembly of Nova Scotia =

- Majority parliament
- 23 May 1974 – 12 August 1978

Parliament leaders
- Premier: Gerald Regan; October 28, 1970 – October 5, 1978
- Leader of the Opposition: John Buchanan; March 6, 1971 – October 5, 1978

Party caucuses
- Government: Liberal Party
- Opposition: Progressive Conservative Party
- Recognized: New Democratic Party

House of Assembly
- Speaker of the House: Vincent MacLean; May 23, 1974 – October 27, 1976
- George Doucet; February 22, 1977 – August 12, 1978
- Members: 46 MLA seats

Sovereign
- Monarch: Elizabeth II; February 6, 1952
- Lieutenant Governor: Clarence Gosse; October 1, 1973

Sessions
- 1st session May 23, 1974 – November 27, 1974
- 2nd session February 3, 1975 – February 17, 1976
- 3rd session February 17, 1976 – May 20, 1976
- 4th session February 22, 1977 – February 7, 1978
- 5th session February 7, 1978 – August 12, 1978
← 50th	→ 52nd

The 51st General Assembly of Nova Scotia represented Nova Scotia between May 23, 1974 and August 12, 1978.

== Division of seats ==
There were 46 members of the General Assembly, elected in the 1974 Nova Scotia general election.

Leader	Party	# of Seats
Gerald Regan	Liberal	31
John Buchanan	Progressive Conservative	12
Jeremy Akerman	NDP	3
Total		46

== List of members ==
Riding	Name	Party	First elected / previously elected	Position
Annapolis East	Gerry Sheehy	Progressive Conservative	1970	
Annapolis West	Peter Murray Nicholson	Liberal	1956	
Antigonish	J. William Gillis	Liberal	1970	
Cape Breton South	Vince MacLean	Liberal	1974	speaker Minister of Lands & Forests (1976)
Cape Breton Centre	James 'Buddy' MacEachern	NDP	1974	
Cape Breton North	Tom McKeough	Progressive Conservative	1960	
Cape Breton Nova	Paul MacEwan	NDP	1970	
Cape Breton East	Jeremy Akerman	NDP	1970	
Cape Breton West	Allan Sullivan	Liberal	1970	
Cape Breton West	Osborne Fraser (1976)	Liberal	1976	
Clare	Benoit Comeau	Liberal	1967	
Colchester	Melinda MacLean	Liberal	1974	
Colchester	Floyd Tucker	Liberal	1974	
Cumberland East	Roger S. Bacon	Progressive Conservative	1970	
Cumberland West	D. L. George Henley	Progressive Conservative	1963	
Cumberland Centre	Guy Brown	Liberal	1974	
Dartmouth North	Glen M. Bagnell	Liberal	1970	
Dartmouth South	Roland J. Thornhill	Progressive Conservative	1974	
Digby	Joseph H. Casey	Liberal	1970	
Guysborough	A. M. "Sandy" Cameron	Liberal	1973	
Halifax Atlantic	John Buchanan	Progressive Conservative	1967	
Halifax Cornwallis	George M. Mitchell	Liberal	1970	
Halifax Citadel	Ronald Wallace	Liberal	1970	
Halifax Chebucto	Walter Fitzgerald	Liberal	1974	
Halifax Cobequid	George Doucet	Liberal	1974	speaker (1977)
Halifax Eastern Shore	Alexander Garnet Brown	Liberal	1969	
Halifax Needham	Gerald Regan	Liberal	1967	Premier
Halifax St. Margarets	Leonard L. Pace	Liberal	1970	
Hants East	Jack Hawkins	Liberal	1970	
Hants West	Robert D. Lindsay	Liberal	1970	
Inverness	Bill MacEachern	Liberal	1974	
Inverness	John Archie MacKenzie	Liberal	1970	
Kings North	Glenn Ells	Liberal	1974	
Kings South	Harry How	Progressive Conservative	1970	
Kings West	Frank C. Bezanson	Liberal	1971	
Lunenburg Centre	Bruce Cochran	Progressive Conservative	1974	
Lunenburg East	Ronald T. Barkhouse	Progressive Conservative	1974	
Lunenburg West	Maurice DeLorey	Liberal	1970	
Pictou East	Donald W. Cameron	Progressive Conservative	1974	
Pictou West	Dan Reid	Liberal	1974	
Pictou Centre	Fraser MacLean	Progressive Conservative	1974	
Pictou Centre	Jack MacIsaac (1977)	Progressive Conservative	1977	
Queens	John Wickwire	Progressive Conservative	1974	
Richmond	Gaston LeBlanc	Liberal	1974	
Shelburne	Harold Huskilson	Liberal	1970	
Victoria	Maynard MacAskil	Liberal	1974	
Yarmouth	Fraser Mooney	Liberal	1970	
Yarmouth	Hugh Tinkham	Liberal	1974	

== Former members of the 51st General Assembly ==
Name	Party	Electoral District	Cause of departure	Succeeded by	Elected
Allan Sullivan	Liberal	Cape Breton West	named to bench	Osborne Fraser, Liberal	September 7, 1976
Fraser MacLean	Progressive Conservative	Pictou Centre	resigned	Jack MacIsaac, PC	September 6, 1977

Preceded by 50th General Assembly of Nova Scotia	General Assemblies of Nova Scotia; 1974–1978	Succeeded by 52nd General Assembly of Nova Scotia
