= Malcolm Patterson =

Malcolm Patterson may refer to:

- Malcolm R. Patterson (1861–1935), American politician and jurist
- Malcolm A. Patterson (1890–1965), lawyer and political figure in Nova Scotia
