= 52nd Nova Scotia general election =

The 52nd Nova Scotia general election may refer to

- the 1978 Nova Scotia general election, the 51st overall general election for Nova Scotia, for the (due to a counting error in 1859) 52nd General Assembly of Nova Scotia, or
- the 1981 Nova Scotia general election, the 52nd overall general election for Nova Scotia, for the 53rd General Assembly of Nova Scotia, but considered the 30th general election for the Canadian province of Nova Scotia.
