= Cape Breton South (provincial electoral district) =

Former provincial electoral district in Nova Scotia, Canada

Nova Scotia electoral district

Defunct provincial electoral district
- Legislature: Nova Scotia House of Assembly
- District created: 1933
- District abolished: 2013
- Last contested: 2009

Demographics
- Population (2011): 19,891
- Electors: 16,838
- Census division: Cape Breton Regional Municipality

Cape Breton South is a former provincial electoral district in Nova Scotia, Canada which existed from 1933 to 2013. It elected one member of the Nova Scotia House of Assembly. In its last configuration, the district included Sydney and its western suburbs until the North West Arm and south along the Sydney River until Blacketts Lake.

In 1933, the Cape Breton County was divided into five electoral districts, one of which was named Cape Breton South. In 2003, it lost part of the Ashby area to Cape Breton Nova and gained Balls Creek and the Coxheath area. Following the 2012 electoral boundary review, the district was dissolved into Northside-Westmount, Sydney-Whitney Pier and Sydney River-Mira-Louisbourg.

== Members of the Legislative Assembly ==
The electoral district was represented by the following members of the Legislative Assembly:

Cape Breton South
Legislature	Years	Member	Party
District created from Cape Breton County (1867–1933)
40th	1933–1937	Gordon Sidney Harrington	Liberal-Conservative
41st	1937–1941	George M. Morrison	Liberal
42nd	1941–1945	Donald MacDonald	Co-operative Commonwealth
43rd	1945–1949	John Smith MacIvor	Liberal
44th	1949–1953	John Smith MacIvor	Liberal
45th	1953–1956	John Smith MacIvor	Liberal
46th	1956–1960	Donald C. MacNeil	Progressive Conservative
47th	1960–1963	Donald C. MacNeil	Progressive Conservative
48th	1963–1967	Donald C. MacNeil	Progressive Conservative
49th	1967–1970	Donald C. MacNeil	Progressive Conservative
50th	1970–1974	John Francis Burke	Progressive Conservative
51st	1974–1978	Vince MacLean	Liberal
52nd	1978–1981	Vince MacLean	Liberal
53rd	1981–1984	Vince MacLean	Liberal
54th	1984–1988	Vince MacLean	Liberal
55th	1988–1993	Vince MacLean	Liberal
56th	1993–1998	Manning MacDonald	Liberal
57th	1998–1999	Manning MacDonald	Liberal
58th	1999–2003	Manning MacDonald	Liberal
59th	2003–2006	Manning MacDonald	Liberal
60th	2006–2009	Manning MacDonald	Liberal
61st	2009–2013	Manning MacDonald	Liberal
District dissolved into dissolved into Northside-Westmount (2013–Present), Sydney-Whitney Pier (2013–2021), and Sydney River-Mira-Louisbourg (2013–2021)

== Election results ==
=== 2009 ===
2009 Nova Scotia general election
Party	Candidate	Votes	%	±%
Liberal	Manning MacDonald	4,278	46.65%	3.15%
New Democratic	Wayne McKay	3,332	36.33%	14.89%
Progressive Conservative	Stephen Tobin	1,387	15.12%	-17.23%
Green	Cathy Theriault	174	1.90%	-0.81%
Total		9,171	–	
Source(s) Source: Nova Scotia Legislature (2024). "Electoral History for Cape Breton South" (PDF). nslegislature.ca.

=== 2006 ===
2006 Nova Scotia general election
Party	Candidate	Votes	%	±%
Liberal	Manning MacDonald	4,383	43.50%	-10.82%
Progressive Conservative	Scott Boyd	3,260	32.35%	15.09%
New Democratic	Jamie Crane	2,160	21.44%	-6.97%
Green	Stephen Doucet	273	2.71%	–
Total		10,076	–	
Source(s) Source: Nova Scotia Legislature (2024). "Electoral History for Cape Breton South" (PDF). nslegislature.ca.

=== 2003 ===
2003 Nova Scotia general election
Party	Candidate	Votes	%	±%
Liberal	Manning MacDonald	5,275	54.32%	-8.58%
New Democratic	Mike MacSween	2,759	28.41%	-0.37%
Progressive Conservative	John Morrison	1,677	17.27%	8.95%
Total		9,711	–	
Source(s) Source: Nova Scotia Legislature (2024). "Electoral History for Cape Breton South" (PDF). nslegislature.ca.

=== 1999 ===
1999 Nova Scotia general election
Party	Candidate	Votes	%	±%
Liberal	Manning MacDonald	5,356	62.90%	2.60%
New Democratic	Elizabeth Cusack	2,451	28.78%	-0.77%
Progressive Conservative	Leland Lewis	708	8.31%	-1.83%
Total		8,515	–	
Source(s) Source: Nova Scotia Legislature (2024). "Electoral History for Cape Breton South" (PDF). nslegislature.ca. Nova Scotia, Chief Electoral Officer (1999). Returns of the General Election for the House of Assembly, Thirty-Fifth General Election (Report). Elections Nova Scotia.

=== 1998 ===
1998 Nova Scotia general election
Party	Candidate	Votes	%	±%
Liberal	Manning MacDonald	5,118	60.30%	2.79%
New Democratic	Ed Murphy	2,508	29.55%	7.65%
Progressive Conservative	Anna Steele	861	10.14%	-10.44%
Total		8,487	–	
Source(s) Source: Nova Scotia Legislature (2024). "Electoral History for Cape Breton South" (PDF). nslegislature.ca.

=== 1993 ===
1993 Nova Scotia general election
Party	Candidate	Votes	%	±%
Liberal	Manning MacDonald	5,629	57.52%	-5.25%
New Democratic	Peter Mancini	2,143	21.90%	12.43%
Progressive Conservative	Norm Ferguson	2,015	20.59%	-7.19%
Total		9,787	–	
Source(s) Source: Nova Scotia Legislature (2024). "Electoral History for Cape Breton South" (PDF). nslegislature.ca. Nova Scotia, Chief Electoral Officer (1993). Returns of the General Election for the House of Assembly, Thirty-Third General Election (PDF) (Report). Queen's Printer. Archived from the original (PDF) on June 18, 2018.

=== 1988 ===
1988 Nova Scotia general election
Party	Candidate	Votes	%	±%
Liberal	Vince MacLean	7,820	62.76%	13.13%
Progressive Conservative	Murdock Smith	3,461	27.78%	-14.26%
New Democratic	Ed MacLeod	1,179	9.46%	4.19%
Total		12,460	–	
Source(s) Source: Nova Scotia Legislature (2024). "Electoral History for Cape Breton South" (PDF). nslegislature.ca. Nova Scotia, Chief Electoral Officer (1988). Returns of the General Election for the House of Assembly, Thirty-Second General Election (PDF) (Report). Queen's Printer. Archived from the original (PDF) on July 7, 2018.

=== 1984 ===
1984 Nova Scotia general election
Party	Candidate	Votes	%	±%
Liberal	Vince MacLean	5,961	49.63%	-6.14%
Progressive Conservative	Murdock Smith	5,049	42.04%	9.88%
New Democratic	John Chisholm	633	5.27%	-6.80%
Labour	Kim MacEwan	367	3.06%	–
Total		12,010	–	
Source(s) Source: Nova Scotia Legislature (2024). "Electoral History for Cape Breton South" (PDF). nslegislature.ca. Nova Scotia, Chief Electoral Officer (1984). Returns of the General Election for the House of Assembly, Thirty-First General Election (PDF) (Report). Queen's Printer. Archived from the original (PDF) on July 31, 2017.

=== 1981 ===
1981 Nova Scotia general election
Party	Candidate	Votes	%	±%
Liberal	Vince MacLean	6,633	55.78%	-4.06%
Progressive Conservative	Murray Hannem	3,824	32.16%	8.69%
New Democratic	Linda Gallant	1,435	12.07%	-4.63%
Total		11,892	–	
Source(s) Source: Nova Scotia Legislature (2024). "Electoral History for Cape Breton South" (PDF). nslegislature.ca. Nova Scotia, Chief Electoral Officer (1981). Returns of the General Election for the House of Assembly, Thirtieth General Election (PDF) (Report). Queen's Printer. Archived from the original (PDF) on July 31, 2017.

=== 1978 ===
1978 Nova Scotia general election
Party	Candidate	Votes	%	±%
Liberal	Vince MacLean	7,041	59.84%	8.96%
Progressive Conservative	Donald C. MacNeil	2,761	23.46%	-5.72%
New Democratic	Sandy MacNeil	1,965	16.70%	-2.44%
Total		11,767	–	
Source(s) Source: Nova Scotia Legislature (2024). "Electoral History for Cape Breton South" (PDF). nslegislature.ca. Nova Scotia, Chief Electoral Officer (1978). Returns of the General Election for the House of Assembly, Twenty-Ninth General Election (PDF) (Report). Queen's Printer. Archived from the original (PDF) on June 18, 2018.

=== 1974 ===
1974 Nova Scotia general election
Party	Candidate	Votes	%	±%
Liberal	Vince MacLean	6,487	50.87%	8.21%
Progressive Conservative	John Francis Burke	3,721	29.18%	-15.18%
New Democratic	Earl Johnston	2,441	19.14%	6.17%
Independent	Angus Currie	102	0.80%	–
Total		12,751	–	
Source(s) Source: Nova Scotia Legislature (2024). "Electoral History for Cape Breton South" (PDF). nslegislature.ca. Nova Scotia, Chief Electoral Officer (1974). Returns of the General Election for the House of Assembly, Twenty-Eighth General Election (PDF) (Report). Queen's Printer. Archived from the original (PDF) on June 18, 2018.

=== 1970 ===
1970 Nova Scotia general election
Party	Candidate	Votes	%	±%
Progressive Conservative	John Francis Burke	5,234	44.36%	-2.82%
Liberal	Vince MacLean	5,034	42.66%	4.24%
New Democratic	Don MacPherson	1,531	12.98%	0.22%
Total		11,799	–	
Source(s) Source: Nova Scotia Legislature (2024). "Electoral History for Cape Breton South" (PDF). nslegislature.ca. Nova Scotia, Legislative Assembly (1970). Returns of the General Election for the House of Assembly, 1970 (PDF) (Report). Queen's Printer. Archived from the original (PDF) on July 25, 2018.

=== 1967 ===
1967 Nova Scotia general election
Party	Candidate	Votes	%	±%
Progressive Conservative	Donald C. MacNeil	4,843	47.18%	-2.03%
Liberal	Charles O'Connell	3,944	38.42%	5.08%
New Democratic	Charles Palmer	1,309	12.75%	-4.70%
Independent	Angus Currie	169	1.65%	–
Total		10,265	–	
Source(s) Source: Nova Scotia Legislature (2024). "Electoral History for Cape Breton South" (PDF). nslegislature.ca. Nova Scotia Legislature (1967). Returns of the General Election for the House of Assembly (PDF) (Report). Queen's Printer. Archived from the original (PDF) on July 25, 2018.

=== 1963 ===
1963 Nova Scotia general election
Party	Candidate	Votes	%	±%
Progressive Conservative	Donald C. MacNeil	5,283	49.21%	2.98%
Liberal	John F. MacIntosh	3,579	33.34%	-0.02%
New Democratic	Edward Johnston	1,873	17.45%	-2.96%
Total		10,735	–	
Source(s) Source: Nova Scotia Legislature (2024). "Electoral History for Cape Breton South" (PDF). nslegislature.ca. Nova Scotia Legislature (1963). Returns of the General Election for the House of Assembly (PDF) (Report). Queen's Printer. Archived from the original (PDF) on July 25, 2018.

=== 1960 ===
1960 Nova Scotia general election
Party	Candidate	Votes	%	±%
Progressive Conservative	Donald C. MacNeil	5,153	46.23%	-1.53%
Liberal	Ritchie McCoy	3,718	33.36%	-8.31%
Co-operative Commonwealth	Bernard O'Neil	2,275	20.41%	9.83%
Total		11,146	–	
Source(s) Source: Nova Scotia Legislature (2024). "Electoral History for Cape Breton South" (PDF). nslegislature.ca. Nova Scotia Legislature (1960). Returns of the General Election for the House of Assembly (PDF) (Report). Queen's Printer. Archived from the original (PDF) on July 25, 2018.

=== 1956 ===
1956 Nova Scotia general election
Party	Candidate	Votes	%	±%
Progressive Conservative	Donald C. MacNeil	5,101	47.76%	25.83%
Liberal	John Smith MacIvor	4,450	41.66%	-3.86%
Co-operative Commonwealth	Albert Martin	1,130	10.58%	-21.97%
Total		10,681	–	
Source(s) Source: Nova Scotia Legislature (2024). "Electoral History for Cape Breton South" (PDF). nslegislature.ca. Nova Scotia Legislature (1956). Returns of the General Election for the House of Assembly (PDF) (Report). Queen's Printer. Archived from the original (PDF) on September 10, 2018.

=== 1953 ===
1953 Nova Scotia general election
Party	Candidate	Votes	%	±%
Liberal	John Smith MacIvor	6,467	45.52%	-1.68%
Co-operative Commonwealth	Vincent Allan Morrison	4,625	32.55%	6.37%
Progressive Conservative	A. O. Gunn	3,115	21.93%	-4.69%
Total		14,207	–	
Source(s) Source: Nova Scotia Legislature (2024). "Electoral History for Cape Breton South" (PDF). nslegislature.ca. Nova Scotia Legislature (1953). Returns of the General Election for the House of Assembly (PDF) (Report). Queen's Printer. Archived from the original (PDF) on September 10, 2018.

=== 1949 ===
1949 Nova Scotia general election
Party	Candidate	Votes	%	±%
Liberal	John Smith MacIvor	6,742	47.20%	4.10%
Progressive Conservative	Ross Anderson MacKimmie	3,802	26.62%	9.83%
Co-operative Commonwealth	Vincent Allan Morrison	3,740	26.18%	-13.94%
Total		14,284	–	
Source(s) Source: Nova Scotia Legislature (2024). "Electoral History for Cape Breton South" (PDF). nslegislature.ca. Nova Scotia Legislature (1949). Returns of the General Election for the House of Assembly (PDF) (Report). Queen's Printer. Archived from the original (PDF) on September 10, 2018.

=== 1945 ===
1945 Nova Scotia general election
Party	Candidate	Votes	%	±%
Liberal	John Smith MacIvor	4,778	43.10%	7.13%
Co-operative Commonwealth	Donald MacDonald	4,448	40.12%	3.59%
Progressive Conservative	Malcolm Cameron	1,861	16.79%	-10.73%
Total		11,087	–	
Source(s) Source: Nova Scotia Legislature (2024). "Electoral History for Cape Breton South" (PDF). nslegislature.ca. Nova Scotia Legislature (1945). Returns of the General Election for the House of Assembly (PDF) (Report). Queen's Printer. Archived from the original (PDF) on September 10, 2018.

=== 1941 ===
1941 Nova Scotia general election
Party	Candidate	Votes	%	±%
Co-operative Commonwealth	Donald MacDonald	4,008	36.53%	–
Liberal	George M. Morrison	3,946	35.96%	-16.04%
Progressive Conservative	Donald John McLean	3,019	27.51%	-20.49%
Total		10,973	–	
Source(s) Source: Nova Scotia Legislature (2024). "Electoral History for Cape Breton South" (PDF). nslegislature.ca. Nova Scotia Legislature (1941). Returns of the General Election for the House of Assembly (PDF) (Report). Queen's Printer. Archived from the original (PDF) on February 8, 2024.

=== 1937 ===
1937 Nova Scotia general election
Party	Candidate	Votes	%	±%
Liberal	George M. Morrison	5,879	52.00%	9.17%
Progressive Conservative	Gordon Sidney Harrington	5,427	48.00%	4.19%
Total		11,306	–	
Source(s) Source: Nova Scotia Legislature (2024). "Electoral History for Cape Breton South" (PDF). nslegislature.ca. Nova Scotia Legislature (1937). Returns of the General Election for the House of Assembly (PDF) (Report). Queen's Printer. Archived from the original (PDF) on March 1, 2019.

=== 1933 ===
1933 Nova Scotia general election
Party	Candidate	Votes	%	±%
Liberal-Conservative	Gordon Sidney Harrington	4,757	43.81%	–
Liberal	Malcolm A. Patterson	4,650	42.83%	–
Co-operative Commonwealth	Lauchlin D. Mackay	1,451	13.36%	–
Total		10,858	–	
Source(s) Source: Nova Scotia Legislature (2024). "Electoral History for Cape Breton South" (PDF). nslegislature.ca. Nova Scotia Legislature (1933). Returns of the General Election for the House of Assembly (PDF) (Report). Queen's Printer. Archived from the original (PDF) on March 1, 2019.

== See also ==
- List of Nova Scotia provincial electoral districts
- Canadian provincial electoral districts
