= Edward Manson =

Canadian politician

MLA for Cape Breton West
- In office 1956–1970
- Preceded by: Malcolm A. Patterson
- Succeeded by: Allan Sullivan

Personal details
- Born: October 6, 1906 Sydney, Nova Scotia
- Died: February 17, 1989 (aged 82)
- Party: Progressive Conservative
- Occupation: pharmacist

Edward Alexander Manson (October 6, 1906 – February 17, 1989) was a Canadian politician. He represented the electoral district of Cape Breton West in the Nova Scotia House of Assembly from 1956 to 1970. He was a member of the Nova Scotia Progressive Conservative Party.

Manson was born in Sydney, Nova Scotia. He was educated at the St. Francis Xavier University and Dalhousie University and was a pharmacist. He married Phemie Wilton in 1927. He owned and operated Manson Drugs Ltd. in Sydney for many years until taking over the Woolco pharmacies throughout the Maritimes. Manson died on February 17, 1989.

Manson first attempted to enter provincial politics in the 1953 Nova Scotia election, but lost to Liberal incumbent Malcolm A. Patterson by over 1,100 votes. Manson ran again in the 1956 election, defeating Patterson by 336 votes. Following the election, Manson was appointed to the Executive Council of Nova Scotia as Minister of Trade and Industry, and Minister of Mines. Manson was re-elected in the 1960, and 1963 elections. Manson continued to serve as Minister of Trade and Industry, but also served as Nova Scotia's first Minister of Fisheries until he resigned from cabinet for personal reasons on June 30, 1964. He remained MLA for Cape Breton West, and was re-elected in the 1967 election. Manson retired from politics in 1970.
