= 1978 Nova Scotia general election =

Canadian provincial election

- September 19, 1978

52 seats of the Nova Scotia House of Assembly 27 seats needed for a majority
- Turnout: 78.23% ▲0.34pp
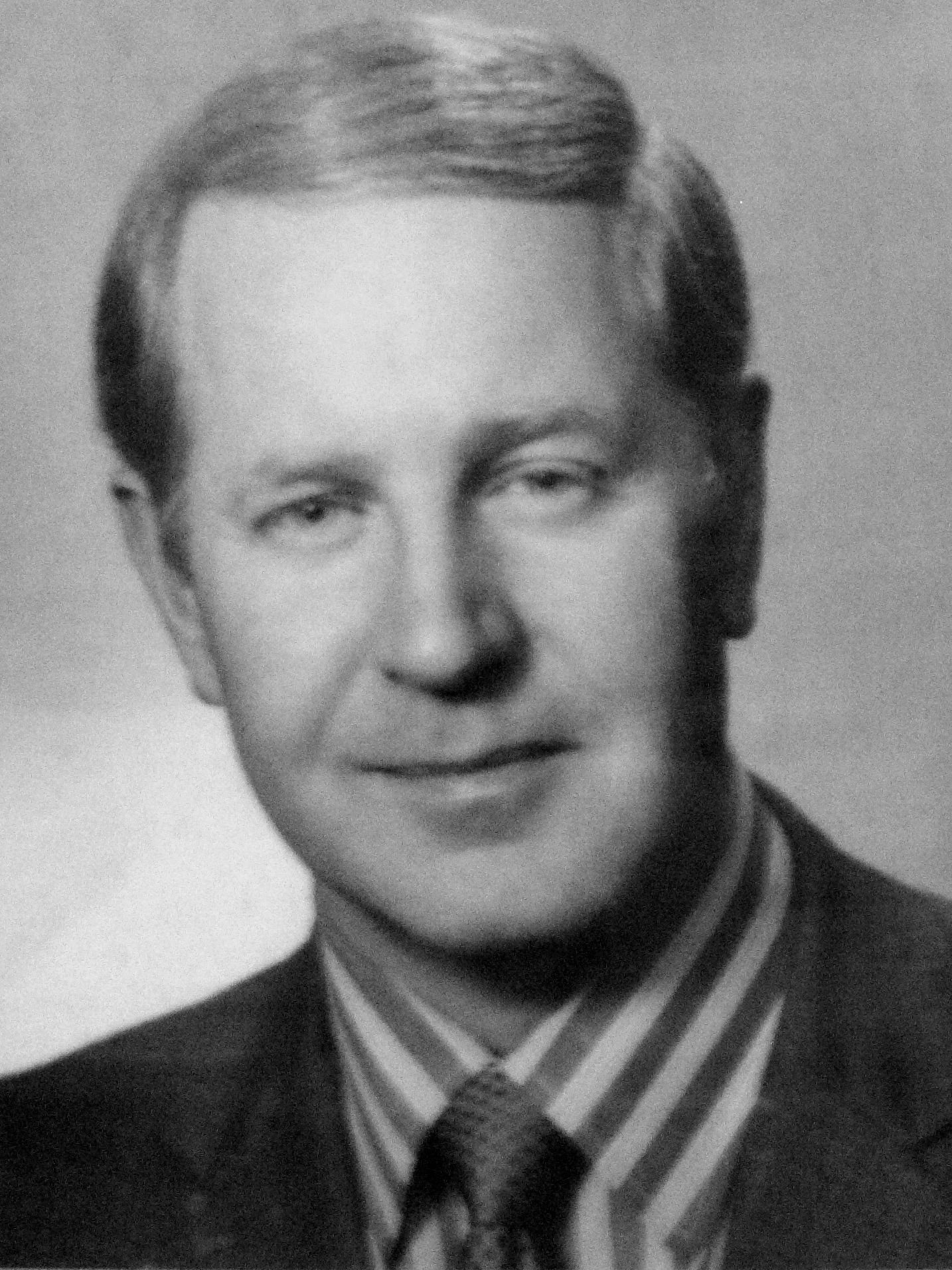

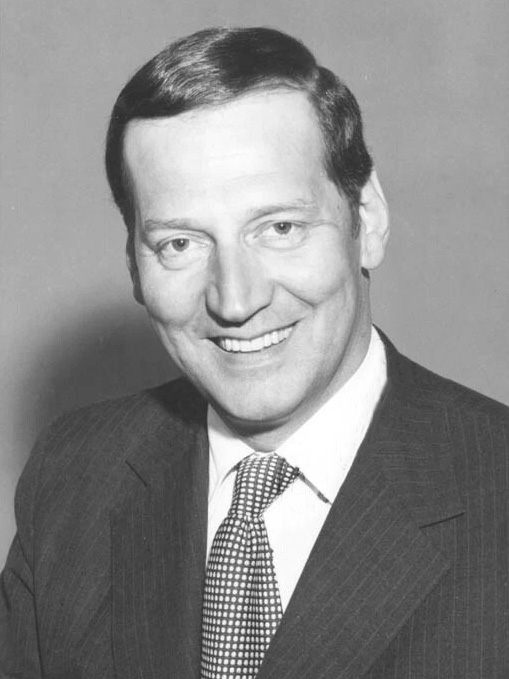

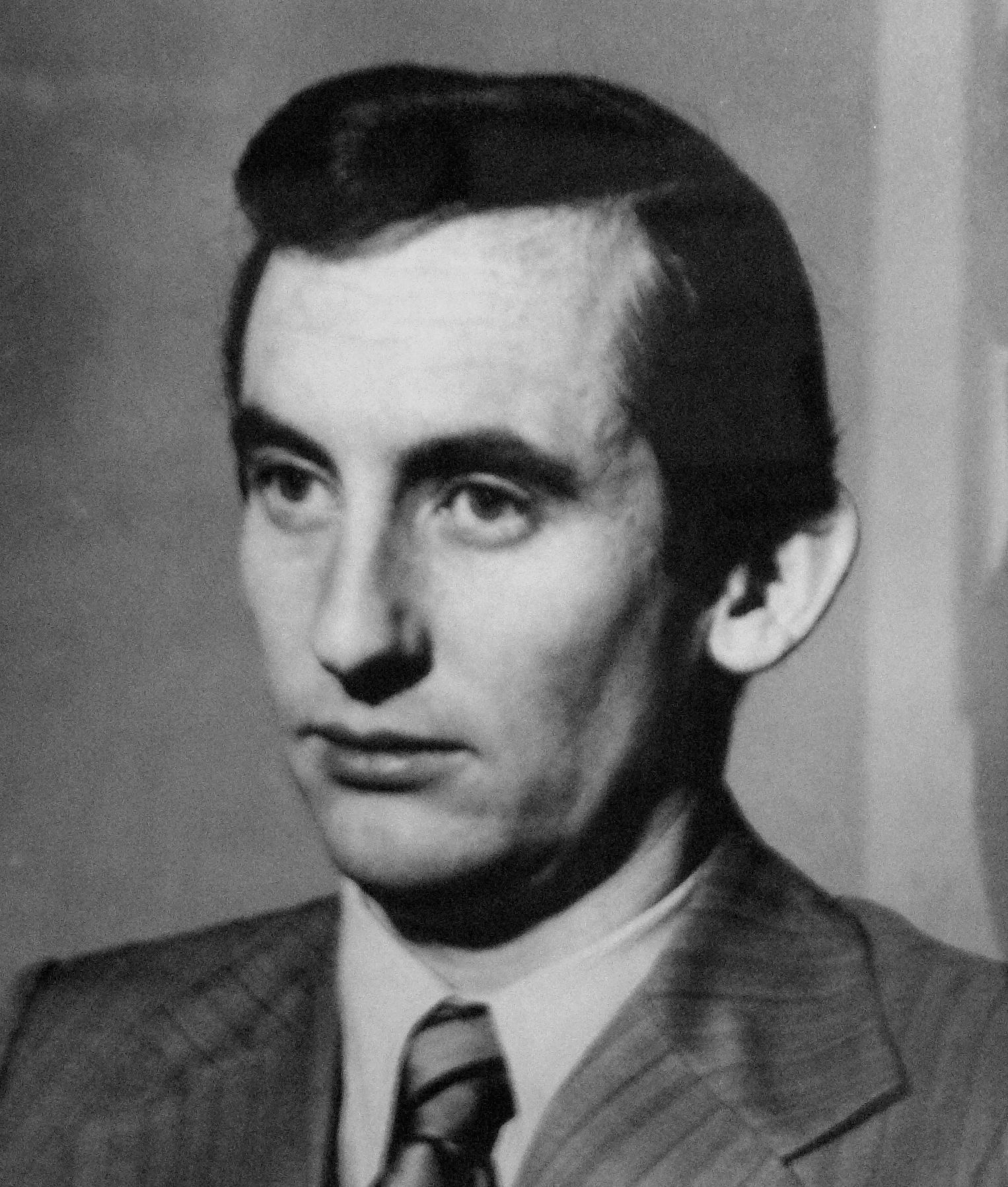
	First party	Second party	Third party
Leader	John Buchanan	Gerald Regan	Jeremy Akerman
Party	Progressive Conservative	Liberal	New Democratic
Leader since	March 6, 1971	July 24, 1965	November 9, 1968
Leader's seat	Halifax Atlantic	Halifax Needham	Cape Breton East
Last election	12	31	3
Seats won	31	17	4
Seat change	▲19	▼14	▲1
Popular vote	203,500	175,218	63,979
Percentage	45.48%	39.16%	14.30%
Swing	▲7.17pp	▼8.41pp	▲1.43pp
Premier before election
Gerald Regan
Liberal
Premier after election
John Buchanan
Progressive Conservative

The 1978 Nova Scotia general election was held on September 19, 1978, to elect members of the 52nd House of Assembly of the Province of Nova Scotia, Canada. It was won by the Progressive Conservative party.

== Results ==
=== Results by party ===
↓
31	17	4
Progressive Conservative	Liberal	New Democratic

Official results
Party	Party leader	# of candidates	Seats				Popular vote		
Party	Party leader	# of candidates	1974	Dissolution	Elected	Change	#	%	Change (pp)
Progressive Conservative	John Buchanan	52	12	12	31	+19	203,500	45.48%	+7.17%
Liberal	Gerald Regan	52	31	30	17	-14	175,218	39.16%	-8.41%
New Democratic	Jeremy Akerman	52	3	3	4	+1	63,979	14.30%	+1.43%
Independent		6	0	0	0	0	2,008	0.45%	-0.06%
Vacant				1					
Total valid votes							444,705	99.39%	+0.13%
Blank and invalid ballots							2,739	0.61%	-0.13%
Total		162	46	46	52	+6	447,444	100.00%	–
Registered voters / turnout							542,547	78.23%	+0.34%

Popular vote
PC	45.48%
Liberal	39.16%
New Democratic	14.30%
Independent	0.45%

Seats summary
PC	59.62%
Liberal	32.69%
New Democratic	7.69%

=== Results by region ===
Party name		HRM	Cape Breton	Annapolis Valley	South Shore	Fundy-Northeast	Central Nova	Total
Parties winning seats in the legislature
Progressive Conservative	Seats:	12	0	6	4	6	3	31
Progressive Conservative	Popular vote:	52.01%	31.95%	51.35%	44.73%	50.28%	48.32%	45.48%
Liberal	Seats:	2	7	2	3	1	2	17
Liberal	Popular vote:	34.50%	42.78%	40.27%	44.10%	40.66%	36.74%	39.16%
New Democratic Party	Seats:	0	4	0	0	0	0	4
New Democratic Party	Popular vote:	12.99%	25.27%	8.38%	9.48%	8.91%	14.48%	14.30%
Parties not winning seats in the legislature
Independent	Popular vote:	0.49%	–	–	1.68%	0.14%	0.46%	0.45%
Total seats:		14	11	8	7	7	5	52

== Retiring incumbents ==
Liberal

- Melinda MacLean, Colchester
- Leonard L. Pace, Halifax-St. Margaret's

Progressive Conservative

- John Wickwire, Queens

== Nominated candidates ==
Legend
bold denotes party leader
† denotes an incumbent who is not running for re-election or was defeated in nomination contest

=== Valley ===
Electoral district	Candidates				Incumbent
Electoral district	Liberal	PC	NDP	Independent	Incumbent
Annapolis East	Carl L. Bruce; 2,470; 36.37%	Gerry Sheehy; 3,863; 56.88%	Roger A. Boutilier; 458; 6.74%		Gerry Sheehy
Annapolis West	Peter M. Nicholson; 2,329; 43.78%	Greg Kerr; 2,690; 50.56%	Larry Duchesne; 301; 5.66%		Peter M. Nicholson
Clare	Benoit Comeau; 2,963; 56.47%	Gerald J.B. Comeau; 1,896; 36.13%	Sylvio Gagnon; 388; 7.39%		Benoit Comeau
Digby	Joseph H. Casey; 3,048; 51.56%	John Comeau; 2,603; 44.03%	John Gray; 261; 4.41%		Joseph H. Casey
Hants West	Robert D. Lindsay; 3,485; 38.08%	Ron Russell; 4,872; 53.23%	Bill Shiers; 795; 8.69%		Robert D. Lindsay
Kings North	Glenn Ells; 3,283; 42.77%	Edward Twohig; 3,744; 48.78%	Donald C. Fraser; 649; 8.45%		Glenn Ells
Kings South	Wilbur H. Starratt; 1,526; 22.66%	Harry How; 4,214; 62.58%	Donald F. Archibald; 994; 14.76%		Harry How
Kings West	Frank Bezanson; 3,559; 37.71%	George Moody; 5,011; 53.09%	William J. Dyer; 869; 9.21%		Frank Bezanson

=== South Shore ===
Electoral district	Candidates				Incumbent
Electoral district	Liberal	PC	NDP	Independent	Incumbent
Lunenburg Centre	Jack Pelley; 3,156; 30.23%	Bruce Cochran; 5,764; 55.22%	Scott D. Miller; 425; 4.07%	Walton Cook; 1,094; 10.48%	Bruce Cochran
Lunenburg East	Wally MacDonald; 1,417; 28.01%	Ron Barkhouse; 3,386; 66.93%	Robert Whiting Sr. 256; 5.06%		Ron Barkhouse
Lunenburg West	Maurice DeLory; 2,791; 36.54%	Mel Pickings; 3,907; 51.15%	G.M. Dean; 941; 12.32%		Maurice DeLory
Queens	Keith Wyer; 2,440; 33.85%	John Leefe; 3,800; 52.72%	A.J. d'Entremont; 968; 13.43%		John Wickwire†
Shelburne	Harold Huskilson; 3,932; 45.06%	A. Etheren Goreham; 3,682; 42.20%	Jane A. Strange; 1,112; 12.74%		Harold Huskilson
Yarmouth	Fraser Mooney; 7,568; 29.25%	Dorothy M. Crosby; 4,389; 16.96%	Hartley Wickens; 1,268; 4.90%		Fraser Mooney
Yarmouth	Hugh Tinkham; 7,339; 28.36%	Harold H. Hanf; 4,122; 15.93%	Charles Paddock; 1,190; 4.60%		Hugh Tinkham

=== Fundy-Northeast ===
Electoral district	Candidates				Incumbent
Electoral district	Liberal	PC	NDP	Independent	Incumbent
Colchester North	Floyd Tucker; 3,023; 43.30%	Bill Campbell; 3,447; 49.37%	Peter Robben; 512; 7.33%		Floyd Tucker; Colchester
Colchester South	Ed Lorraine; 2,187; 38.11%	R. Colin Stewart; 3,230; 56.28%	Chester Rice; 322; 5.61%		Melinda MacLean†; Colchester
Cumberland Centre	Guy Brown; 2,515; 53.75%	Russell Fisher; 1,354; 28.94%	Dennis R. Calder; 810; 17.31%		Guy Brown
Cumberland East	Norman J. Mansour; 3,234; 34.15%	Roger Stuart Bacon; 4,955; 52.33%	Francis Soontiens; 1,280; 13.52%		Roger Stuart Bacon
Cumberland West	Duncan Lake; 2,292; 43.72%	D. L. George Henley; 2,633; 50.23%	John S. Edgecombe; 317; 6.05%		D. L. George Henley
Hants East	Jack Hawkins; 3,294; 42.15%	G. Patrick Hunt; 4,035; 51.63%	Clair White; 486; 6.22%		Jack Hawkins
Truro—Bible Hill	Peter Wilson; 3,160; 37.04%	Ron Giffin; 4,713; 55.24%	Tom Barron; 589; 6.90%	Bob Kirk; 70; 0.82%	New riding

=== Central Halifax ===
Electoral district	Candidates				Incumbent
Electoral district	Liberal	PC	NDP	Independent	Incumbent
Halifax Bedford Basin	Wilfred Moore; 4,081; 35.08%	Joel Matheson; 6,325; 54.36%	Tom Orman; 1,229; 10.56%		New riding
Halifax Chebucto	Walter Fitzgerald; 3,998; 44.28%	Margaret Stanbury; 3,733; 41.34%	Donald F. Mielke; 1,298; 14.38%		Walter Fitzgerald
Halifax Citadel	Ronald Wallace; 3,525; 37.82%	Art Donahoe; 3,780; 40.56%	Michael Bradfield; 2,015; 21.62%		Ronald Wallace
Halifax Cornwallis	George M. Mitchell; 3,104; 31.77%	Terry Donahoe; 4,446; 45.51%	Michael Coyle; 2,220; 22.72%		George M. Mitchell
Halifax Needham	**Gerald Regan**; 3,553; 43.38%	Pat Curran; 3,416; 41.70%	James Miller; 1,222; 14.92%		Gerald Regan

=== Suburban Halifax ===
Electoral district	Candidates				Incumbent
Electoral district	Liberal	PC	NDP	Independent	Incumbent
Bedford-Musquodoboit Valley	Jim MacLean; 2,743; 32.65%	Ken Streatch; 4,951; 58.93%	Gerald B. Hoganson; 708; 8.43%		New riding
Halifax Atlantic	Jerry F. Blom; 2,303; 22.28%	**John Buchanan**; 6,628; 64.13%	Susan Holtz; 1,274; 12.33%	Art Canning; 131; 1.27%	John Buchanan
Halifax-St. Margaret's	Terry Tingley; 3,149; 32.45%	Jerry Lawrence; 5,277; 54.38%	Garry Richard Craig; 1,278; 13.17%		Leonard L. Pace†
Sackville	George Doucet; 3,554; 34.47%	Malcolm A. MacKay; 5,247; 50.89%	Doug MacDonald; 990; 9.60%	Evan Morgan; 519; 5.03%	George Doucet; Halifax Cobequid

=== Dartmouth/Cole Harbour/Eastern Shore ===
Electoral district	Candidates				Incumbent
Electoral district	Liberal	PC	NDP	Independent	Incumbent
Cole Harbour	Peter Sawler; 2,782; 35.59%	David Nantes; 4,278; 54.73%	Daniel laFitte; 757; 9.68%		New riding
Dartmouth East	Barbara Hart; 3,488; 36.27%	Richard L. Weldon; 5,098; 53.02%	Gabriel Des Rochers; 1,030; 10.71%		New riding
Dartmouth North	Glen M. Bagnell; 2,927; 33.94%	Laird Stirling; 4,561; 52.89%	Nick Rolls; 1,135; 13.16%		Glen M. Bagnell
Dartmouth South	Norman Crawford; 2,365; 25.38%	Roland J. Thornhill; 5,530; 59.35%	Mike Marshall; 1,423; 15.27%		Roland J. Thornhill
Halifax Eastern Shore	Alexander Garnet Brown; 3,911; 40.07%	Tom McInnis; 5,298; 54.28%	Daniel Matheson; 552; 5.66%		Alexander Garnet Brown

=== Central Nova ===
Electoral district	Candidates				Incumbent
Electoral district	Liberal	PC	NDP	Independent	Incumbent
Antigonish	Bill Gillis; 4,689; 49.82%	Bill McNeil; 3,713; 39.45%	John Arthur Murphy; 1,010; 10.73%		Bill Gillis
Guysborough	A.M. "Sandy" Cameron; 3,306; 47.87%	Jim Johnson; 3,293; 47.68%	Kevin Patrick Keeping; 307; 4.45%		A.M. "Sandy" Cameron
Pictou Centre	Erskine Cumming; 2,313; 20.00%	Jack MacIsaac; 6,056; 52.36%	Austin Sutton; 3,068; 26.52%	Jim Beck; 130; 1.12%	Jack MacIsaac
Pictou East	W.G. Bill Munro; 2,364; 32.30%	Donald Cameron; 4,315; 58.96%	Bill Mitton; 639; 8.73%		Donald Cameron
Pictou West	Dan Reid; 2,735; 40.61%	Donald P. McInnes; 2,888; 42.89%	John McDonald; 1,047; 15.55%	Lloyd H. MacLellan; 64; 0.95%	Dan Reid

=== Cape Breton ===
Electoral district	Candidates				Incumbent
Electoral district	Liberal	PC	NDP	Independent	Incumbent
Cape Breton Centre	Francis MacLean; 2,993; 36.96%	Peter MacKinnon; 1,510; 18.65%	Buddy MacEachern; 3,594; 44.39%		Buddy MacEachern
Cape Breton East	Vincent Kachafanas; 3,109; 27.21%	Frank Edwards; 3,182; 27.85%	**Jeremy Akerman**; 5,135; 44.94%		Jeremy Akerman
Cape Breton North	Barry LeBlanc; 2,782; 28.17%	Tom MacKeough; 3,215; 32.56%	Len J. Arsenault; 3,878; 39.27%		Tom MacKeough
Cape Breton Nova	Earle Tubrett; 2,867; 34.60%	Percy Gaum; 1,502; 18.12%	Paul MacEwan; 3,918; 47.28%		Paul MacEwan
Cape Breton South	Vince MacLean; 7,041; 59.84%	Donald C. MacNeil; 2,761; 23.46%	Sandy MacNeil; 1,965; 16.70%		Vince MacLean
Cape Breton—The Lakes	Ossie Fraser; 3,473; 46.26%	Jim MacDonald; 2,642; 35.19%	Irene LeBlanc; 1,393; 18.55%		New riding
Cape Breton West	David Muise; 3,664; 36.80%	"Big" Donnie MacLeod; 3,081; 30.95%	Frank Boone; 3,211; 32.25%		Ossie Fraser
Inverness	William MacEachern; 6,270; 27.10%	Bernie MacLean; 5,412; 23.39%	Archie A. Chisholm; 644; 2.78%		William MacEachern
Inverness	John Archie MacKenzie; 5,632; 24.34%	Bill MacIsaac; 4,614; 19.94%	Joyce Campbell; 563; 2.43%		John Archie MacKenzie
Richmond	Gaston LeBlanc; 3,287; 49.39%	Eva Landry; 2,446; 36.75%	Bruce Wright; 922; 13.85%		Gaston LeBlanc
Victoria	Peter John Nicholson; 2,199; 48.29%	Catherine MacNeil Jankowski; 1,992; 43.74%	Steve Lake; 363; 7.97%		Vacant
