= Glavine =

Glavine is a surname. Notable people with the surname include:

- Leo Glavine (born 1948), Canadian politician
- Mike Glavine (born 1973), American baseball player and coach
- Tom Glavine (born 1966), American Major League Baseball pitcher, member of the Baseball Hall of Fame
