= Manning MacDonald =

Canadian politician

The Honourable Manning MacDonald CD ECNS

MLA for Cape Breton South
- In office May 25, 1993 – May 29, 2013
- Preceded by: Vince MacLean
- Succeeded by: riding dissolved

Personal details
- Born: September 18, 1942 (age 83) Sydney, Nova Scotia
- Party: Liberal
- Occupation: Municipal Politician

Manning MacDonald CD, ECNS (born September 18, 1942) is a Canadian politician. He represented the electoral district of Cape Breton South in the Nova Scotia House of Assembly from May 25, 1993 to May 29, 2013. He is a member of the Liberals.

== Early life and education ==
MacDonald attended school at St. Francis Xavier College, the University College of Cape Breton and Dalhousie University.

== Political career ==
MacDonald served as mayor of Sydney, Nova Scotia from 1978 to 1993. He entered provincial politics in the 1993 election, defeating Peter Mancini and Norm Ferguson to win the Cape Breton South riding. MacDonald served as a backbench member of John Savage's government until June 27, 1996, when he was appointed to the Executive Council of Nova Scotia as Minister of Labour.

When Russell MacLellan was sworn-in as premier in July 1997, MacDonald was named Minister of Economic Development and Tourism. In 1997, he also took over as the Liberal House Leader, a position he held until January 2012. In the 1998 election, MacDonald was re-elected by over 2,600 votes. Following the election, MacDonald remained at Economic Development and Tourism, but was given six other portfolios in the minority government, including the Priorities and Planning Secretariat, and responsibility for Sysco. In December 1998, he was given an additional role in cabinet, Minister responsible for the Petroleum Directorate.

The Liberals lost government in the 1999 election, but MacDonald was again re-elected in his riding by over 2,000 votes. Moving to the opposition side for the first time in his career, MacDonald was re-elected in the 2003, 2006, and 2009 elections.

On January 6, 2012, MacDonald announced he would be retiring from politics prior to the next provincial election. In May 2013, MacDonald came under scrutiny for taking a four-week holiday during the spring session of the Nova Scotia Legislature. He resigned his seat on May 29, 2013, one day before a scheduled vote of the legislature on whether to dock his pay for the time he was absent.
