= Kings West (Nova Scotia electoral district) =

Provincial electoral district in Nova Scotia, Canada

Nova Scotia electoral district

Provincial electoral district
- Legislature: Nova Scotia House of Assembly
MLA
Chris Palmer
Progressive Conservative
- District created: 1956
- First contested: 1956
- Last contested: 2024

Demographics
- Population (2011): 19,495
- Electors: 15,019
- Area (km²): 1,143
- Pop. density (per km²): 17.1
- Census division: Kings County

Kings West is a provincial electoral district in Nova Scotia, Canada, that elects one member of the Nova Scotia House of Assembly. It includes the town of Berwick and the villages of Aylesford, Kingston, and Greenwood.

== Geography ==
The electoral district of Kings West has 1,143 km^{2} (441 sq mi) of land area.

== Members of the Legislative Assembly ==
This riding has elected the following members of the Legislative Assembly:

Kings West
Legislature	Years	Member	Party
Riding created from Kings
46th	1956–1960	Hiram Thomas	Progressive Conservative
47th	1960–1963	Edward D. MacArthur	Liberal
48th	1963–1967	Paul Kinsman	Progressive Conservative
49th	1967–1970	Gordon Tidman	Progressive Conservative
50th	1970–1971	Gordon Tidman	Progressive Conservative
50th	1971–1974	Frank Bezanson	Liberal
51st	1974–1978	Frank Bezanson	Liberal
52nd	1978–1981	George Moody	Progressive Conservative
53rd	1981–1984	George Moody	Progressive Conservative
54th	1984–1988	George Moody	Progressive Conservative
55th	1988–1993	George Moody	Progressive Conservative
56th	1993–1998	George Moody	Progressive Conservative
57th	1998–1999	George Moody	Progressive Conservative
58th	1999–2003	Jon Carey	Progressive Conservative
59th	2003–2006	Leo Glavine	Liberal
60th	2006–2009	Leo Glavine	Liberal
61st	2009–2013	Leo Glavine	Liberal
62nd	2013–2017	Leo Glavine	Liberal
63rd	2017–2021	Leo Glavine	Liberal
64th	2021–2024	Chris Palmer	Progressive Conservative
65th	2024–present	Chris Palmer	Progressive Conservative

== Election results ==
=== 2024 ===
2024 Nova Scotia general election: Kings West
Party	Candidate	Votes	%	±%
Progressive Conservative	Chris Palmer	5,226	72.8%	+23.35
Liberal	Brad Beardsley	1,074	15.0%	-26.52
New Democratic	Paul Doerr	714	9.9%	+3.99
Green	Madeline Taylor	167	2.3%	-0.03
Total valid votes				
Total rejected ballots				
Turnout		7,181		
Eligible voters				
Progressive Conservative hold		Swing		
Source: Elections Nova Scotia

=== 2021 ===
2021 Nova Scotia general election
Party	Candidate	Votes	%	±%	Expenditures
Progressive Conservative	Chris Palmer	4,592	49.45	+12.28	$59,202.28
Liberal	Emily Lutz	3,856	41.52	-10.53	$46,726.60
New Democratic	Jason Langille	549	5.91	-1.54	$25,715.69
Green	Sue Earle	216	2.33	-0.76	$460.95
Atlantica	Rick Mehta	74	0.79	+0.55	$200.00
Total valid votes/expense limit		9,287	99.73	–	$95,352.07
Total rejected ballots		25	0.27		
Turnout		9,312	56.65		
Eligible voters		16,439			
Progressive Conservative gain from Liberal		Swing		+11.41	
Source: Elections Nova Scotia

=== 2017 ===
2017 provincial election redistributed results
Party	Vote	%
Liberal	4,559	52.06
Progressive Conservative	3,255	37.17
New Democratic	653	7.46
Green	270	3.08
Atlantica	21	0.24

2017 Nova Scotia general election: Kings West
Party	Candidate	Votes	%	±%
Liberal	Leo Glavine	4,190	52.45	-21.86
Progressive Conservative	Chris Palmer	3,015	37.74	+21.65
New Democratic	Cheryl Burbidge	536	6.71	-0.90
Green	Madeline Taylor	247	3.09	+1.10
Total valid votes		7,988	100	
Total rejected ballots		18	0.22	
Turnout		8,006	53.30	
Eligible voters		15,019		
Liberal hold		Swing		-21.76
Source: Elections Nova Scotia

=== 2013 ===
2013 Nova Scotia general election
Party	Candidate	Votes	%	±%
Liberal	Leo Glavine	5,585	73.29	12.53
Progressive Conservative	Jody A. Frowley	1,275	16.73	-3.47
New Democratic	Robert K. (Bob) Landry	603	7.91	-9.32
Green	Barbera G. Lake	157	2.06	0.25
Total		7,620	–	
Source(s) Source: Nova Scotia Legislature (2024). "Electoral History for Kings West" (PDF). nslegislature.ca. Nova Scotia, Chief Electoral Officer (2013). 39th Provincial General Election, October 8, 2013: Volume 1 – Statement of Votes & Statistics (PDF) (Report). Elections Nova Scotia. Archived from the original (PDF) on 10 April 2018.

=== 2009 ===
2009 Nova Scotia general election
Party	Candidate	Votes	%	±%
Liberal	Leo Glavine	5,015	60.77	14.10
Progressive Conservative	Chris Palmer	1,667	20.20	-12.98
New Democratic	Carol Tobin	1,422	17.23	-1.60
Green	Nistal Prem de Boer	149	1.81	0.48
Total		8,253	–	
Source(s) Source: Nova Scotia Legislature (2024). "Electoral History for Kings West" (PDF). nslegislature.ca.

=== 2006 ===
2006 Nova Scotia general election
Party	Candidate	Votes	%	±%
Liberal	Leo Glavine	3,940	46.67	9.75
Progressive Conservative	John Prall	2,801	33.18	-2.33
New Democratic	Greg Hubbert	1,590	18.83	-8.75
Green	Nistal Prem de Boer	112	1.33	–
Total		8,443	–	
Source(s) Source: Nova Scotia Legislature (2024). "Electoral History for Kings West" (PDF). nslegislature.ca.

=== 2003 ===
2003 Nova Scotia general election
Party	Candidate	Votes	%	±%
Liberal	Leo Glavine	3,045	36.91	8.21
Progressive Conservative	Jon Carey	2,929	35.51	-13.83
New Democratic	Greg Hubbert	2,275	27.58	7.65
Total		8,249	–	
Source(s) Source: Nova Scotia Legislature (2024). "Electoral History for Kings West" (PDF). nslegislature.ca.

=== 1999 ===
1999 Nova Scotia general election
Party	Candidate	Votes	%	±%
Progressive Conservative	Jon Carey	4,033	49.34	-12.76
Liberal	Don Clarke	2,346	28.70	8.10
New Democratic	Jacquie DeMestral	1,629	19.93	2.63
Nova Scotia Party	Frances Adams	166	2.03	–
Total		8,174	–	
Source(s) Source: Nova Scotia Legislature (2024). "Electoral History for Kings West" (PDF). nslegislature.ca. Nova Scotia, Chief Electoral Officer (1999). Returns of the General Election for the House of Assembly, Thirty-Fifth General Election (Report). Elections Nova Scotia.

=== 1998 ===
1998 Nova Scotia general election
Party	Candidate	Votes	%	±%
Progressive Conservative	George Moody	5,075	62.09	9.02
Liberal	Baden Thurber	1,684	20.60	-13.86
New Democratic	Jacquie DeMestral	1,414	17.30	5.86
Total		8,173	–	
Source(s) Source: Nova Scotia Legislature (2024). "Electoral History for Kings West" (PDF). nslegislature.ca.

=== 1993 ===
1993 Nova Scotia general election
Party	Candidate	Votes	%	±%
Progressive Conservative	George Moody	4,895	53.08	-6.53
Liberal	Baden Thurber	3,178	34.46	2.99
New Democratic	Jacquie DeMestral	1,055	11.44	2.52
Natural Law	Christopher MacLean	94	1.02	–
Total		9,222	–	
Source(s) Source: Nova Scotia Legislature (2024). "Electoral History for Kings West" (PDF). nslegislature.ca. Nova Scotia, Chief Electoral Officer (1993). Returns of the General Election for the House of Assembly, Thirty-Third General Election (PDF) (Report). Queen's Printer. Archived from the original (PDF) on 18 June 2018.

=== 1988 ===
1988 Nova Scotia general election
Party	Candidate	Votes	%	±%
Progressive Conservative	George Moody	5,899	59.61	-0.84
Liberal	Frank Bezanson	3,114	31.47	2.28
New Democratic	Ralph Lynch	883	8.92	-1.44
Total		9,896	–	
Source(s) Source: Nova Scotia Legislature (2024). "Electoral History for Kings West" (PDF). nslegislature.ca. Nova Scotia, Chief Electoral Officer (1988). Returns of the General Election for the House of Assembly, Thirty-Second General Election (PDF) (Report). Queen's Printer. Archived from the original (PDF) on 7 July 2018.

=== 1984 ===
1984 Nova Scotia general election
Party	Candidate	Votes	%	±%
Progressive Conservative	George Moody	5,273	60.45	1.02
Liberal	Doug McKeil	2,546	29.19	3.79
New Democratic	Ted Davis	904	10.36	-4.80
Total		8,723	–	
Source(s) Source: Nova Scotia Legislature (2024). "Electoral History for Kings West" (PDF). nslegislature.ca. Nova Scotia, Chief Electoral Officer (1984). Returns of the General Election for the House of Assembly, Thirty-First General Election (PDF) (Report). Queen's Printer. Archived from the original (PDF) on 31 July 2017.

=== 1981 ===
1981 Nova Scotia general election
Party	Candidate	Votes	%	±%
Progressive Conservative	George Moody	5,286	59.43	6.35
Liberal	Dan Weir	2,259	25.40	-12.31
New Democratic	Carolyn Queen	1,349	15.17	5.96
Total		8,894	–	
Source(s) Source: Nova Scotia Legislature (2024). "Electoral History for Kings West" (PDF). nslegislature.ca. Nova Scotia, Chief Electoral Officer (1981). Returns of the General Election for the House of Assembly, Thirtieth General Election (PDF) (Report). Queen's Printer. Archived from the original (PDF) on 31 July 2017.

=== 1978 ===
1978 Nova Scotia general election
Party	Candidate	Votes	%	±%
Progressive Conservative	George Moody	5,011	53.09	15.86
Liberal	Frank Bezanson	3,559	37.71	-20.72
New Democratic	William J. Dyer	869	9.21	4.86
Total		9,439	–	
Source(s) Source: Nova Scotia Legislature (2024). "Electoral History for Kings West" (PDF). nslegislature.ca. Nova Scotia, Chief Electoral Officer (1978). Returns of the General Election for the House of Assembly, Twenty-Ninth General Election (PDF) (Report). Queen's Printer. Archived from the original (PDF) on 18 June 2018.

=== 1974 ===
1974 Nova Scotia general election
Party	Candidate	Votes	%	±%
Liberal	Frank Bezanson	5,031	58.43	6.50
Progressive Conservative	Kathleen E. Howlett	3,206	37.23	-10.84
New Democratic	Donald Wolsey	374	4.34	–
Total		8,611	–	
Source(s) Source: Nova Scotia Legislature (2024). "Electoral History for Kings West" (PDF). nslegislature.ca. Nova Scotia, Chief Electoral Officer (1974). Returns of the General Election for the House of Assembly, Twenty-Eighth General Election (PDF) (Report). Queen's Printer. Archived from the original (PDF) on 18 June 2018.

=== 1971 ===
Nova Scotia provincial by-election, 1971-10-13
Party	Candidate	Votes	%	±%
Liberal	Frank Bezanson	4,350	51.93	2.98
Progressive Conservative	Fred Chisholm	4,027	48.07	-0.88
Total		8,377	–	
Source(s) Source: Nova Scotia Legislature (2024). "Electoral History for Kings West" (PDF). nslegislature.ca.

=== 1970 ===
1970 Nova Scotia general election
Party	Candidate	Votes	%	±%
Liberal	Frank Bezanson	3,735	48.95	1.28
Progressive Conservative	Gordon Tidman	3,735	48.95	-0.03
Independent	F. Keith Boates	160	2.10	–
Total		7,630	–	
Source(s) Source: Nova Scotia Legislature (2024). "Electoral History for Kings West" (PDF). nslegislature.ca. Nova Scotia, Legislative Assembly (1970). Returns of the General Election for the House of Assembly, 1970 (PDF) (Report). Queen's Printer. Archived from the original (PDF) on 25 July 2018.

=== 1967 ===
1967 Nova Scotia general election
Party	Candidate	Votes	%	±%
Progressive Conservative	Gordon Tidman	3,619	48.98	-6.86
Liberal	Frank Bezanson	3,522	47.67	3.52
New Democratic	Ralph Loomer	247	3.34	–
Total		7,388	–	
Source(s) Source: Nova Scotia Legislature (2024). "Electoral History for Kings West" (PDF). nslegislature.ca. Nova Scotia Legislature (1967). Returns of the General Election for the House of Assembly (PDF) (Report). Queen's Printer. Archived from the original (PDF) on 25 July 2018.

=== 1963 ===
1963 Nova Scotia general election
Party	Candidate	Votes	%	±%
Progressive Conservative	Paul Kinsman	3,879	55.85	10.67
Liberal	Edward D. MacArthur	3,067	44.15	-7.78
Total		6,946	–	
Source(s) Source: Nova Scotia Legislature (2024). "Electoral History for Kings West" (PDF). nslegislature.ca. Nova Scotia Legislature (1963). Returns of the General Election for the House of Assembly (PDF) (Report). Queen's Printer. Archived from the original (PDF) on 25 July 2018.

=== 1960 ===
1960 Nova Scotia general election
Party	Candidate	Votes	%	±%
Liberal	Edward D. MacArthur	3,937	51.93	1.96
Progressive Conservative	R. F. Hazel	3,425	45.18	-4.85
Co-operative Commonwealth	George Turner	219	2.89	–
Total		7,581	–	
Source(s) Source: Nova Scotia Legislature (2024). "Electoral History for Kings West" (PDF). nslegislature.ca. Nova Scotia Legislature (1960). Returns of the General Election for the House of Assembly (PDF) (Report). Queen's Printer. Archived from the original (PDF) on 25 July 2018.

=== 1956 ===
1956 Nova Scotia general election
Party	Candidate	Votes	%	±%
Progressive Conservative	Hiram Thomas	2,988	50.03	–
Liberal	C. D. McLean	2,985	49.97	–
Total		5,973	–	
Source(s) Source: Nova Scotia Legislature (2024). "Electoral History for Kings West" (PDF). nslegislature.ca. Nova Scotia Legislature (1956). Returns of the General Election for the House of Assembly (PDF) (Report). Queen's Printer. Archived from the original (PDF) on 10 September 2018.

== See also ==
- List of Nova Scotia provincial electoral districts
- Canadian provincial electoral districts
