= Gordon Tidman =

Canadian politician

The Honourable Gordon Tidman ECNS KC

MLA for Kings West
- In office 1967–1971
- Preceded by: Paul Kinsman
- Succeeded by: Frank Bezanson

Personal details
- Born: August 21, 1932 (age 93) Halifax, Nova Scotia
- Party: Progressive Conservative
- Occupation: lawyer

Gordon Alfred Tidman, KC (born August 21, 1932) is a Canadian lawyer, politician and judge. He represented the electoral district of Kings West in the Nova Scotia House of Assembly from 1967 to 1971. He was a member of the Nova Scotia Progressive Conservative Party.

Tidman was born in Country Harbour, Nova Scotia. He attended King's-Edgehill School, University of King's College and Dalhousie University, earning a Bachelor of Laws degree. In 1957, he married Margaret Sprague. He served in the Executive Council of Nova Scotia as Minister of Public Welfare from 1969 to 1970. He was named a Queen's Counsel in 1974. Tidman was appointed a judge of the Nova Scotia Supreme Court in 1985. He retired from the court in 2007.
