= Russell MacKinnon =

Canadian politician

Member of the Nova Scotia House of Assembly for Cape Breton West
- In office 1998–2006
- Preceded by: Alfie MacLeod
- Succeeded by: Alfie MacLeod
- In office 1988–1995
- Preceded by: Donnie MacLeod
- Succeeded by: Alfie MacLeod

Personal details
- Born: October 4, 1953 (age 72) Grand Mira South, Nova Scotia, Canada
- Party: Nova Scotia Liberal Party (former); Independent (later)
- Spouse: Michèle Raymond

Russell Vincent MacKinnon (born October 4, 1953) is a Canadian politician in Nova Scotia. He represented Cape Breton West in the Nova Scotia House of Assembly from 1988 to 1995 and then from 1998 to 2006 as a Liberal and then Independent member.

== Early life and education ==
MacKinnon was born in Grand Mira South, Nova Scotia, in 1953. He was educated at the Nova Scotia Land Survey Institute.

== Political career ==
First elected in the 1988 Nova Scotia general election from the Cape Breton West seat, MacKinnon later served in the provincial cabinet as Minister of Labour when the Liberal took power in 1993.

In 1994, MacKinnon was suspended from the Liberal caucus for refusing to vote in favor of the government's municipal services exchange bill. MacKinnon sat as an independent until he resigned his seat on April 10, 1995, to make an unsuccessful bid to become mayor of the Cape Breton Regional Municipality. He won his former seat in 1998. He sat as an independent from April 2005 and did not run for reelection in 2006, when he was defeated in a bid to win the Progressive Conservative nomination in Cape Breton West.

== Criminal charges ==
On February 14, 2011, it was announced that MacKinnon was among four people facing criminal charges in connection with the RCMP investigation into 2010s MLA expense scandal. MacKinnon was charged with fraud exceeding $5,000, breach of trust by a public officer, and 8 counts of uttering a forged document.

On May 3, 2012, MacKinnon pleaded not guilty and went to trial on the charges in March 2013. On March 15, 2013, MacKinnon stopped testifying at his trial and pleaded guilty to breach of trust, and was sentenced to an eight-month conditional sentence.
