= John Francis Burke =

Canadian politician (1923–2006)

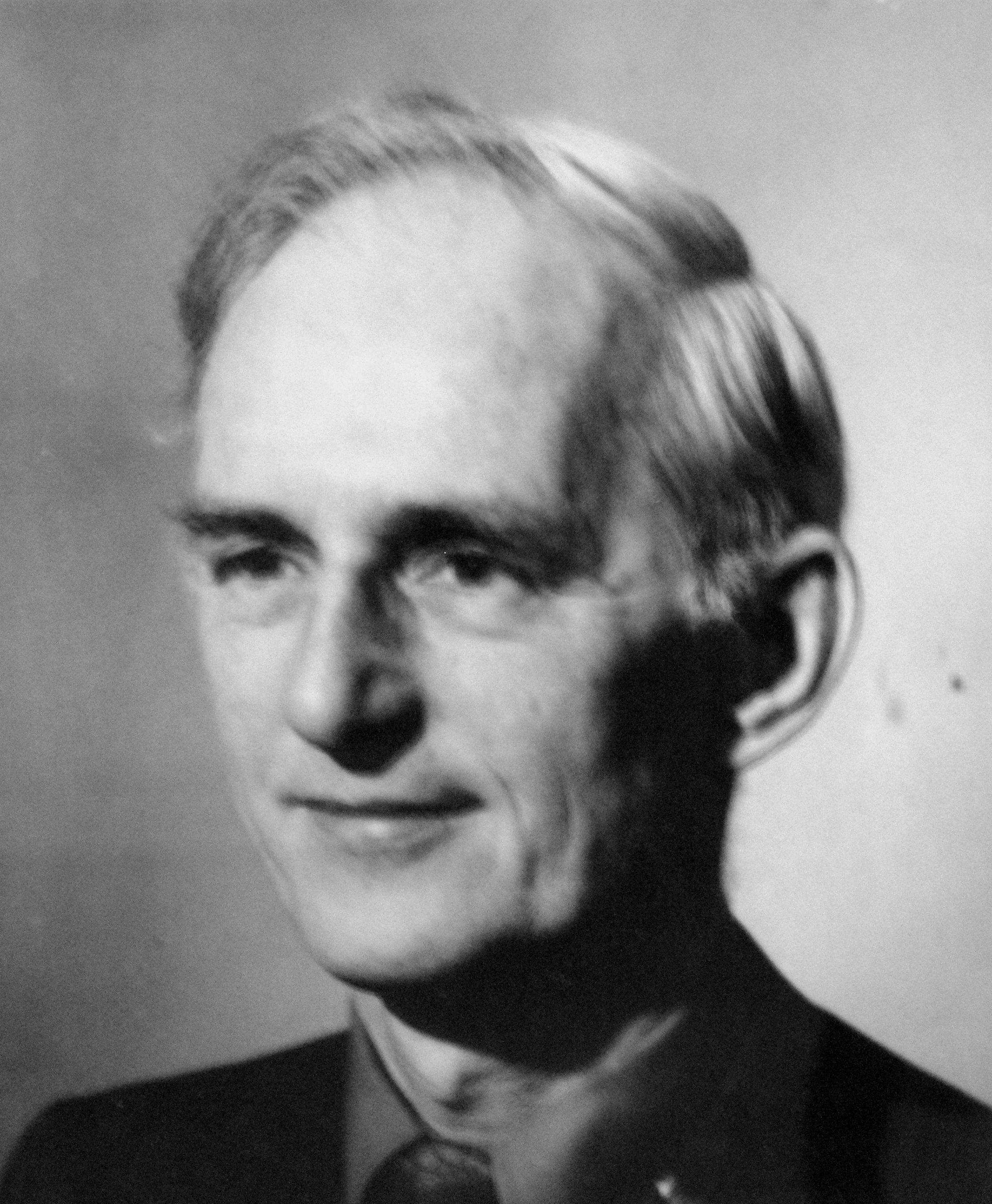
- Burke, c. 1973

MLA for Cape Breton South
- In office 1970–1974
- Preceded by: Donald C. MacNeil
- Succeeded by: Vince MacLean

Personal details
- Born: February 8, 1923 Sydney, Nova Scotia
- Died: August 4, 2006 (aged 83) Sydney, Nova Scotia
- Party: Progressive Conservative
- Occupation: Dentist

John Francis Burke (February 8, 1923 – August 4, 2006) was a Canadian dentist and politician. He represented the electoral district of Cape Breton South in the Nova Scotia House of Assembly from 1970 to 1974. He was a member of the Progressive Conservative Association of Nova Scotia.

Burke was born in Sydney, Nova Scotia. He was educated at St. Francis Xavier University and Dalhousie University, earning his D.D.S. degree at the latter in 1947. He was married to Theresa Carmelita MacLean. She died in 2003. He died at Cape Breton Regional Hospital on August 4, 2006.
