= Halifax Cornwallis =

Former provincial electoral district in Nova Scotia, Canada

Nova Scotia electoral district

Defunct provincial electoral district
- Legislature: Nova Scotia House of Assembly
- District created: 1967
- District abolished: 1993
- Last contested: 1988

Halifax Cornwallis was a provincial electoral district in Nova Scotia, Canada, that elected one member of the Nova Scotia House of Assembly. It existed from 1967 to 1993.

== Members of the Legislative Assembly ==
This electoral district elected the following members of the Legislative Assembly:

Halifax Cornwallis
Legislature	Years	Member	Party
District created from Halifax South (1933–1967)
49th	1967–1970	Richard Donahoe	Progressive Conservative
50th	1970–1974	George M. Mitchell	Liberal
51st	1974–1978	George M. Mitchell	Liberal
52nd	1978–1981	Terry Donahoe	Progressive Conservative
53rd	1981–1984	Terry Donahoe	Progressive Conservative
54th	1984–1988	Terry Donahoe	Progressive Conservative
55th	1988–1993	Terry Donahoe	Progressive Conservative
District renamed to Halifax Citadel (1993–2009)

== Election results ==
=== 1988 ===
1988 Nova Scotia general election
Party	Candidate	Votes	%	±%
Progressive Conservative	Terry Donahoe	4,195	39.91%	-7.89%
Liberal	Liz Crocker	4,013	38.18%	13.22%
New Democratic	Allan O'Brien	2,304	21.92%	-5.32%
Total		10,512	–	
Source(s) Source: Nova Scotia Legislature (2024). "Electoral History for Halifax Cornwallis" (PDF). nslegislature.ca. Nova Scotia, Chief Electoral Officer (1988). Returns of the General Election for the House of Assembly, Thirty-Second General Election (PDF) (Report). Queen's Printer. Archived from the original (PDF) on 7 July 2018.

=== 1984 ===
1984 Nova Scotia general election
Party	Candidate	Votes	%	±%
Progressive Conservative	Terry Donahoe	5,273	47.80%	1.02%
New Democratic	Tim Hill	3,005	27.24%	1.25%
Liberal	Dale Godsoe	2,753	24.96%	-2.27%
Total		11,031	–	
Source(s) Source: Nova Scotia Legislature (2024). "Electoral History for Halifax Cornwallis" (PDF). nslegislature.ca. Nova Scotia, Chief Electoral Officer (1984). Returns of the General Election for the House of Assembly, Thirty-First General Election (PDF) (Report). Queen's Printer. Archived from the original (PDF) on 31 July 2017.

=== 1981 ===
1981 Nova Scotia general election
Party	Candidate	Votes	%	±%
Progressive Conservative	Terry Donahoe	4,927	46.79%	1.28%
Liberal	Dean Salsman	2,867	27.22%	-4.55%
New Democratic	Michael Coyle	2,737	25.99%	3.27%
Total		10,531	–	
Source(s) Source: Nova Scotia Legislature (2024). "Electoral History for Halifax Cornwallis" (PDF). nslegislature.ca. Nova Scotia, Chief Electoral Officer (1981). Returns of the General Election for the House of Assembly, Thirtieth General Election (PDF) (Report). Queen's Printer. Archived from the original (PDF) on 31 July 2017.

=== 1978 ===
1978 Nova Scotia general election
Party	Candidate	Votes	%	±%
Progressive Conservative	Terry Donahoe	4,446	45.51%	11.72%
Liberal	George M. Mitchell	3,104	31.77%	-15.75%
New Democratic	Muriel Duckworth	2,220	22.72%	4.03%
Total		9,770	–	
Source(s) Source: Nova Scotia Legislature (2024). "Electoral History for Halifax Cornwallis" (PDF). nslegislature.ca. Nova Scotia, Chief Electoral Officer (1978). Returns of the General Election for the House of Assembly, Twenty-Ninth General Election (PDF) (Report). Queen's Printer. Archived from the original (PDF) on 18 June 2018.

=== 1974 ===
1974 Nova Scotia general election
Party	Candidate	Votes	%	±%
Liberal	George M. Mitchell	5,391	47.52%	-6.21%
Progressive Conservative	George Cooper	3,833	33.79%	-5.49%
New Democratic	Muriel Duckworth	2,121	18.70%	11.69%
Total		11,345	–	
Source(s) Source: Nova Scotia Legislature (2024). "Electoral History for Halifax Cornwallis" (PDF). nslegislature.ca. Nova Scotia, Chief Electoral Officer (1974). Returns of the General Election for the House of Assembly, Twenty-Eighth General Election (PDF) (Report). Queen's Printer. Archived from the original (PDF) on 18 June 2018.

=== 1970 ===
1970 Nova Scotia general election
Party	Candidate	Votes	%	±%
Liberal	George M. Mitchell	5,323	53.72%	10.11%
Progressive Conservative	Richard Donahoe	3,891	39.27%	-17.12%
New Democratic	Barrett D. Halderman	694	7.00%	–
Total		9,908	–	
Source(s) Source: Nova Scotia Legislature (2024). "Electoral History for Halifax Cornwallis" (PDF). nslegislature.ca. Nova Scotia, Legislative Assembly (1970). Returns of the General Election for the House of Assembly, 1970 (PDF) (Report). Queen's Printer. Archived from the original (PDF) on 25 July 2018.

=== 1967 ===
1967 Nova Scotia general election
Party	Candidate	Votes	%	±%
Progressive Conservative	Richard Donahoe	5,458	56.39%	–
Liberal	Clarence Gosse	4,221	43.61%	–
Total		9,679	–	
Source(s) Source: Nova Scotia Legislature (2024). "Electoral History for Halifax Cornwallis" (PDF). nslegislature.ca. Nova Scotia Legislature (1967). Returns of the General Election for the House of Assembly (PDF) (Report). Queen's Printer. Archived from the original (PDF) on 25 July 2018.

== See also ==
- List of Nova Scotia provincial electoral districts
- Canadian provincial electoral districts
