= Cape Breton East =

Provincial electoral district in Nova Scotia, Canada

Nova Scotia electoral district

Provincial electoral district
- Legislature: Nova Scotia House of Assembly
MLA
Brian Comer
Progressive Conservative
- District created: 1933
- First contested: 1933
- Last contested: 2024

Demographics
- Electors: 15,098
- Area (km²): 1,093
- Census division: Cape Breton County
- Census subdivision: Cape Breton Regional Municipality

Cape Breton East (formerly Sydney River-Mira-Louisbourg) is a provincial electoral district in Nova Scotia, Canada, that elects one member of the Nova Scotia House of Assembly. The riding is represented by Brian Comer of the Progressive Conservative Party.

In 1925, the County of Cape Breton and neighbouring Richmond County were divided into three distinct electoral districts, one of which was named Richmond-West Cape Breton. In 1933, on the recommendations of the 1932 Electoral Boundaries Commission, Richmond-West Cape Breton was dissolved and two new districts were created, one of which was Cape Breton West, which also took in parts of Cape Breton Centre and Cape Breton East. In 2003, this district had minor adjustments to its boundaries with Cape Breton South, Cape Breton Centre, and Glace Bay. It gained the area on the north side of East Bay along highway 216 to include Eskasoni First Nation. In 2013, following the recommendations of the 2012 Electoral Boundaries Commission, the district was renamed Sydney River-Mira-Louisbourg. It gained the Mira Road, Sydney River, Prime Brook, and Coxheath areas from Cape Breton South, as well as a section of Grand Lake Road from Cape Breton Nova. It lost the area northwest of East Bay to Victoria-The Lakes and the area southwest of Portage and Sandfield and west of the Mira River to Cape Breton-Richmond.

The riding was renamed Cape Breton East for the 2021 Nova Scotia general election.

== Members of the Legislative Assembly ==
This riding has elected the following members of the Legislative Assembly:

Legislature	Years	Member	Party
Cape Breton West; Riding created from Cape Breton Centre, Cape Breton East and Richmond and Cape Breton West
40th	1933–1937	Weldon W. Patton	Conservative
41st	1937–1941	Malcolm A. Patterson	Liberal
42nd	1941–1945	Malcolm A. Patterson	Liberal
43rd	1945–1949	Malcolm A. Patterson	Liberal
44th	1949–1953	Malcolm A. Patterson	Liberal
45th	1953–1956	Malcolm A. Patterson	Liberal
46th	1956–1960	Edward Manson	Progressive Conservative
47th	1960–1963	Edward Manson	Progressive Conservative
48th	1963–1967	Edward Manson	Progressive Conservative
49th	1967–1970	Edward Manson	Progressive Conservative
50th	1970–1974	Allan Sullivan	Liberal
51st	1974–1976	Allan Sullivan	Liberal
51st	1976–1978	Ossie Fraser	Liberal
52nd	1978–1981	David Muise	Liberal
53rd	1981–1984	Donnie MacLeod	Progressive Conservative
54th	1984–1988	Donnie MacLeod	Progressive Conservative
55th	1988–1993	Russell MacKinnon	Liberal
56th	1993–1995	Russell MacKinnon	Liberal
56th	1995–1998	Alfie MacLeod	Progressive Conservative
57th	1998–1999	Russell MacKinnon	Liberal
58th	1999–2003	Russell MacKinnon	Liberal
59th	2003–2005	Russell MacKinnon	Liberal
59th	2005–2006	Russell MacKinnon	Independent
60th	2006–2009	Alfie MacLeod	Progressive Conservative
61st	2009–2013	Alfie MacLeod	Progressive Conservative
Sydney River-Mira-Louisbourg
62nd	2013–2017	Alfie MacLeod	Progressive Conservative
63rd	2017–2019	Alfie MacLeod	Progressive Conservative
63rd	2019–2021	Brian Comer	Progressive Conservative
Cape Breton East
64th	2021–2024	Brian Comer	Progressive Conservative
65th	2024–present	Brian Comer	Progressive Conservative

== Election results ==
=== Cape Breton East ===
==== 2024 ====
2024 Nova Scotia general election
Party	Candidate	Votes	%	±%
Progressive Conservative	Brian Comer	4,250	61.34	+15.07
Liberal	Joe Ward	1,737	25.07	-11.66
New Democratic	Isabel Lalonde	942	13.60	-3.41
Total		6,929	–	
Total rejected ballots		50		
Turnout		6,980	48.50	
Eligible voters		14,391		
Progressive Conservative hold		Swing		
Source: Elections Nova Scotia

==== 2021 ====
2021 Nova Scotia general election
Party	Candidate	Votes	%	±%	Expenditures
Progressive Conservative	Brian Comer	3,897	46.27	+2.54	$55,547.93
Liberal	Heather Peters	3,094	36.73	+5.36	$65,200.97
New Democratic	Barbara Beaton	1,432	17.00	+9.32	$24,642.72
Total valid votes/expense limit		8,423	99.37	-0.29	$81,087.67
Total rejected ballots		53	0.63	+0.29	
Turnout		8,476	61.42	+12.56	
Eligible voters		13,801			
Progressive Conservative hold		Swing		-1.41	
Source: Elections Nova Scotia

=== Sydney River-Mira-Louisbourg ===
==== 2019 by-election ====
Nova Scotia provincial by-election, September 3, 2019 Resignation of Alfie MacLeod
Party	Candidate	Votes	%	±%	Expenditures
Progressive Conservative	Brian Comer	3,215	43.73	-24.00	$34,626.70
Liberal	Marc Botte	2,306	31.37	+7.75	$49,500.53
Independent	Russ Green	979	13.32		$3,211.14
New Democratic	Mary Beth MacDonald	565	7.68	-0.97	$2,024.87
Green	Bill Matheson	287	3.90		$0.00
Total valid votes/Expense limit		7,352	99.66	+0.26	$90,230.82
Total rejected ballots		25	0.34	-0.26	
Turnout		7,377	48.86	-11.90	
Eligible voters		15,098			
Progressive Conservative hold		Swing		-15.88	

==== 2017 ====
2017 Nova Scotia general election: Sydney River-Mira-Louisbourg
Party	Candidate	Votes	%	±%
Progressive Conservative	Alfie MacLeod	6,370	67.73	+23.98
Liberal	Katherine MacDonald	2,221	23.62	-16.16
New Democratic	Bill Matheson	814	8.65	-7.82
Total valid votes		9,405	99.40	–
Total rejected ballots		57	0.60	-0.17
Turnout		9,462	60.76	-2.59
Eligible voters		15,572		
Progressive Conservative hold		Swing		+20.07
Source: Elections Nova Scotia

==== 2013 ====
2013 Nova Scotia general election
Party	Candidate	Votes	%	±%
Progressive Conservative	Alfie MacLeod	4,178	43.75	+0.28
Liberal	Josephine Kennedy	3,798	39.78	+15.51
New Democratic	Delton MacDonald	1,573	16.47	-14.22
Total valid votes		9,549	99.23	–
Total rejected ballots		74	0.77	–
Turnout		9,623	63.35	+1.76
Eligible voters		15,190		
Progressive Conservative notional hold		Swing		+7.90
Source: Elections Nova Scotia

=== Cape Breton West ===
2009 Nova Scotia general election
Party	Candidate	Votes	%	±%
Progressive Conservative	Alfie MacLeod	3,962	43.47	-10.29
New Democratic	Delton MacDonald	2,797	30.69	+15.41
Liberal	Josephine Kennedy	2,212	24.27	-4.01
Green	Mike Parsons	143	1.57	-1.11
Total valid votes		9,114	99.70	–
Total rejected ballots		27	0.30	–
Turnout		9,141	61.59	-0.54
Eligible voters		14,843		
Progressive Conservative hold		Swing		-12.85
Source: Elections Nova Scotia; Nova Scotia Legislature (2024). "Electoral History for Cape Breton West" (PDF). nslegislature.ca.

2006 Nova Scotia general election
Party	Candidate	Votes	%	±%
Progressive Conservative	Alfie MacLeod	4,729	53.76	+28.33
Liberal	Dave LeBlanc	2,488	28.28	-24.56
New Democratic	Terry Crawley	1,344	15.28	-6.45
Green	Michael P. Milburn	236	2.68	+2.68
Total valid votes		8,797	99.61	–
Total rejected ballots		34	0.39	–
Turnout		8,831	62.13	-5.36
Eligible voters		14,215		
Progressive Conservative gain from Liberal		Swing		+26.45
Source: Elections Nova Scotia; Nova Scotia Legislature (2024). "Electoral History for Cape Breton West" (PDF). nslegislature.ca.

2003 Nova Scotia general election
Party	Candidate	Votes	%	±%
Liberal	Russell MacKinnon	4,616	52.84	+1.01
Progressive Conservative	Ivan Doncaster	2,221	25.43	+11.44
New Democratic	Douglas MacKinlay	1,898	21.73	-12.45
Total valid votes		8,735	99.50	–
Total rejected ballots		44	0.50	–
Turnout		8,779	67.49	-11.46
Eligible voters		13,007		
Liberal hold		Swing		+6.23
Source: Elections Nova Scotia; Nova Scotia Legislature (2024). "Electoral History for Cape Breton West" (PDF). nslegislature.ca.

1999 Nova Scotia general election
Party	Candidate	Votes	%	±%
Liberal	Russell MacKinnon	5,094	51.83	+7.78
New Democratic	Brian Slaney	3,359	34.18	+5.65
Progressive Conservative	Joe Boudreau	1,375	13.99	-13.43
Total valid votes		9,828	99.34	–
Total rejected ballots		65	0.66	–
Turnout		9,893	78.95	-0.92
Eligible voters		12,531		
Liberal hold		Swing		+6.72
Source: Elections Nova Scotia; Nova Scotia Legislature (2024). "Electoral History for Cape Breton West" (PDF). nslegislature.ca.

1998 Nova Scotia general election
Party	Candidate	Votes	%	±%
Liberal	Russell MacKinnon	4,528	44.05	+10.71
New Democratic	Brian Slaney	2,933	28.53	-1.95
Progressive Conservative	Alfie MacLeod	2,818	27.42	-8.76
Total valid votes		10,279	99.58	–
Total rejected ballots		43	0.42	–
Turnout		10,322	79.87	+15.34
Eligible voters		12,924		
Liberal gain from Progressive Conservative		Swing		+6.33
Source: Elections Nova Scotia; Nova Scotia Legislature (2024). "Electoral History for Cape Breton West" (PDF). nslegislature.ca.

Nova Scotia provincial by-election, October 10, 1995 upon the resignation of Russell MacKinnon
Party	Candidate	Votes	%	±%
Progressive Conservative	Alfie MacLeod	2,824	36.18	+16.62
Liberal	Gerry Delaney	2,603	33.34	-36.67
New Democratic	Brian Slaney	2,379	30.48	+23.08
Total valid votes		7,806	99.33	–
Total rejected ballots		53	0.67	–
Turnout		7,859	64.53	-17.96
Eligible voters		12,179		
Progressive Conservative gain from Liberal		Swing		+26.65
Source: Elections Nova Scotia

1993 Nova Scotia general election
Party	Candidate	Votes	%	±%
Liberal	Russell MacKinnon	7,355	70.01	+15.70
Progressive Conservative	Victor Hanham	2,055	19.56	-16.31
New Democratic	Daniel O'Connor	777	7.40	-2.42
Independent	Wendy MacKenzie	318	3.03	+3.03
Total valid votes		10,505	99.51	–
Total rejected ballots		52	0.49	–
Turnout		10,557	82.49	-0.16
Eligible voters		12,798		
Liberal hold		Swing		+16.01
Source: Elections Nova Scotia; Nova Scotia Legislature (2024). "Electoral History for Cape Breton West" (PDF). nslegislature.ca.

1988 Nova Scotia general election
Party	Candidate	Votes	%	±%
Liberal	Russell MacKinnon	6,133	54.31	+14.27
Progressive Conservative	Donald Archie MacLeod	4,050	35.87	-15.49
New Democratic	Con Mills	1,109	9.82	+3.88
Total valid votes		11,292	99.41	–
Total rejected ballots		67	0.59	–
Turnout		11,359	82.65	+9.37
Eligible voters		13,743		
Liberal gain from Progressive Conservative		Swing		+14.88
Source: Elections Nova Scotia; Nova Scotia Legislature (2024). "Electoral History for Cape Breton West" (PDF). nslegislature.ca.

1984 Nova Scotia general election
Party	Candidate	Votes	%	±%
Progressive Conservative	Donald Archie MacLeod	5,035	51.36	+8.77
Liberal	Russell MacKinnon	3,925	40.04	+1.48
New Democratic	Terry Crawley	582	5.94	-12.91
Cape Breton Labour	Linda Martin	261	2.66	+2.66
Total valid votes		9,803	99.50	–
Total rejected ballots		49	0.50	–
Turnout		9,852	73.28	-4.00
Eligible voters		13,444		
Progressive Conservative hold		Swing		+5.13
Source: Elections Nova Scotia; Nova Scotia Legislature (2024). "Electoral History for Cape Breton West" (PDF). nslegislature.ca.

1981 Nova Scotia general election
Party	Candidate	Votes	%	±%
Progressive Conservative	Donald Archie MacLeod	4,125	42.59	+11.64
Liberal	David Muise	3,735	38.56	+1.76
New Democratic	Elizabeth Cusack Walsh	1,826	18.85	-12.10
Total valid votes		9,686	99.11	–
Total rejected ballots		87	0.89	–
Turnout		9,773	77.28	-6.30
Eligible voters		12,647		
Progressive Conservative gain from Liberal		Swing		+6.70
Source: Elections Nova Scotia; Nova Scotia Legislature (2024). "Electoral History for Cape Breton West" (PDF). nslegislature.ca.

1978 Nova Scotia general election
Party	Candidate	Votes	%	±%
Liberal	David Muise	3,664	36.80	+1.06
New Democratic	Frank Boone	3,211	32.25	-1.00
Progressive Conservative	Donald Archie MacLeod	3,081	30.95	-0.06
Total valid votes		9,956	99.36	–
Total rejected ballots		64	0.64	–
Turnout		10,020	83.58	+5.43
Eligible voters		11,988		
Liberal hold		Swing		+1.03
Source: Elections Nova Scotia; Nova Scotia Legislature (2024). "Electoral History for Cape Breton West" (PDF). nslegislature.ca.

Nova Scotia provincial by-election, September 7, 1976 upon the resignation of Allan Sullivan
Party	Candidate	Votes	%	±%
Liberal	Osborne Fraser	4,236	35.74	-17.72
New Democratic	Frank Boone	3,940	33.25	+13.94
Progressive Conservative	James MacDonald	3,675	31.01	+3.78
Total valid votes		11,851	98.68	–
Total rejected ballots		158	1.32	–
Turnout		12,009	78.15	-3.59
Eligible voters		15,366		
Liberal hold		Swing		-15.83
Source: Elections Nova Scotia

1974 Nova Scotia general election
Party	Candidate	Votes	%	±%
Liberal	Allan Sullivan	6,281	53.46	+2.54
Progressive Conservative	Kenneth Andrews	3,199	27.23	-21.85
New Democratic	Frank Boone	2,269	19.31	+19.31
Total valid votes		11,749	99.03	–
Total rejected ballots		115	0.97	–
Turnout		11,864	81.74	+3.55
Eligible voters		14,515		
Liberal hold		Swing		+12.20
Source: Elections Nova Scotia; Nova Scotia Legislature (2024). "Electoral History for Cape Breton West" (PDF). nslegislature.ca.

1970 Nova Scotia general election
Party	Candidate	Votes	%	±%
Liberal	Allan Sullivan	5,024	50.92	+8.27
Progressive Conservative	Kenneth Andrews	4,843	49.08	+5.13
Total valid votes		9,867	98.84	–
Total rejected ballots		116	1.16	–
Turnout		9,983	78.19	-1.58
Eligible voters		12,768		
Liberal gain from Progressive Conservative		Swing		+6.70
Source: Elections Nova Scotia; Nova Scotia Legislature (2024). "Electoral History for Cape Breton West" (PDF). nslegislature.ca.

1967 Nova Scotia general election
Party	Candidate	Votes	%	±%
Progressive Conservative	Edward Manson	3,862	43.95	-12.35
Liberal	Allan Sullivan	3,748	42.65	-1.05
New Democratic	Jeremy Akerman	1,178	13.40	+13.40
Total valid votes		8,788	99.39	–
Total rejected ballots		54	0.61	–
Turnout		8,842	79.77	-0.32
Eligible voters		11,084		
Progressive Conservative hold		Swing		-6.70
Source: Elections Nova Scotia; Nova Scotia Legislature (2024). "Electoral History for Cape Breton West" (PDF). nslegislature.ca.

1963 Nova Scotia general election
Party	Candidate	Votes	%	±%
Progressive Conservative	Edward Manson	4,941	56.30	+10.93
Liberal	Allan Sullivan	3,835	43.70	+4.17
Total valid votes		8,776	99.31	–
Total rejected ballots		61	0.69	–
Turnout		8,837	80.09	-8.71
Eligible voters		11,034		
Progressive Conservative hold		Swing		+7.55
Source: Elections Nova Scotia; Nova Scotia Legislature (2024). "Electoral History for Cape Breton West" (PDF). nslegislature.ca.

1960 Nova Scotia general election
Party	Candidate	Votes	%	±%
Progressive Conservative	Edward Manson	4,192	45.37	-6.60
Liberal	Herbert Shannon	3,652	39.53	-8.50
Co-operative Commonwealth	John R. Lynk	1,395	15.10	+15.10
Total valid votes		9,239	99.48	–
Total rejected ballots		48	0.52	–
Turnout		9,287	88.80	+1.53
Eligible voters		10,458		
Progressive Conservative hold		Swing		-7.55
Source: Elections Nova Scotia; Nova Scotia Legislature (2024). "Electoral History for Cape Breton West" (PDF). nslegislature.ca.

1956 Nova Scotia general election
Party	Candidate	Votes	%	±%
Progressive Conservative	Edward Manson	4,440	51.97	+18.41
Liberal	Malcolm Alexander Patterson	4,104	48.03	-0.83
Total valid votes		8,544	99.26	–
Total rejected ballots		64	0.74	–
Turnout		8,608	87.27	+2.07
Eligible voters		9,864		
Progressive Conservative gain from Liberal		Swing		+9.62
Source: Elections Nova Scotia; Nova Scotia Legislature (2024). "Electoral History for Cape Breton West" (PDF). nslegislature.ca.

1953 Nova Scotia general election
Party	Candidate	Votes	%	±%
Liberal	Malcolm Alexander Patterson	3,730	48.86	-2.27
Progressive Conservative	Edward Manson	2,562	33.56	+2.08
Co-operative Commonwealth	Harry Munroe	1,342	17.58	+0.19
Total valid votes		7,634	99.76	–
Total rejected ballots		18	0.24	–
Turnout		7,652	85.20	+3.85
Eligible voters		8,981		
Liberal hold		Swing		-2.18
Source: Elections Nova Scotia; Nova Scotia Legislature (2024). "Electoral History for Cape Breton West" (PDF). nslegislature.ca.

1949 Nova Scotia general election
Party	Candidate	Votes	%	±%
Liberal	Malcolm Alexander Patterson	3,444	51.13	+1.31
Progressive Conservative	David R. MacLeod	2,120	31.48	+13.81
Co-operative Commonwealth	Arthur Briggs	1,171	17.39	-15.12
Total valid votes		6,735	99.23	–
Total rejected ballots		53	0.77	–
Turnout		6,787	81.35	+9.99
Eligible voters		8,343		
Liberal hold		Swing		+7.56
Source: Elections Nova Scotia; Nova Scotia Legislature (2024). "Electoral History for Cape Breton West" (PDF). nslegislature.ca.

1945 Nova Scotia general election
Party	Candidate	Votes	%	±%
Liberal	Malcolm Alexander Patterson	2,826	49.82	+8.72
Co-operative Commonwealth	Robert Joseph Orr	1,844	32.51	+5.10
Progressive Conservative	Horace L. Ferguson	1,002	17.67	-13.32
Total valid votes		5,672	99.60	–
Total rejected ballots		23	0.40	–
Turnout		5,695	71.36	-3.59
Eligible voters		7,981		
Liberal hold		Swing		+6.91
Source: Elections Nova Scotia; Nova Scotia Legislature (2024). "Electoral History for Cape Breton West" (PDF). nslegislature.ca.

1941 Nova Scotia general election
Party	Candidate	Votes	%	±%
Liberal	Malcolm Alexander Patterson	2,306	41.10	-9.70
Progressive Conservative	Joseph Alexander MacDonald	1,767	31.49	-17.71
Co-operative Commonwealth	Robert Joseph Orr	1,538	27.41	+27.41
Total valid votes		5,611	99.24	–
Total rejected ballots		43	0.76	–
Turnout		5,654	74.95	-4.07
Eligible voters		7,544		
Liberal hold		Swing		-13.71
Source: Elections Nova Scotia; Nova Scotia Legislature (2024). "Electoral History for Cape Breton West" (PDF). nslegislature.ca.

1937 Nova Scotia general election
Party	Candidate	Votes	%	±%
Liberal	Malcolm Alexander Patterson	2,883	50.80	+4.29
Progressive Conservative	Evan M. Forbes	2,792	49.20	-4.29
Total valid votes		5,675	99.40	–
Total rejected ballots		34	0.60	–
Turnout		5,709	79.02	-0.13
Eligible voters		7,225		
Liberal gain from Progressive Conservative		Swing		+4.29
Source: Elections Nova Scotia; Nova Scotia Legislature (2024). "Electoral History for Cape Breton West" (PDF). nslegislature.ca.

1933 Nova Scotia general election
Party	Candidate	Votes	%	±%
Liberal-Conservative	Weldon W. Patton	3,036	53.49	–
Liberal	Alonzo Martell	2,640	46.51	–
Total valid votes		5,676	99.63	–
Total rejected ballots		21	0.37	–
Turnout		5,697	79.15	–
Eligible voters		7,198		
Progressive Conservative notional gain from Liberal		Swing		–
Source: Elections Nova Scotia; Nova Scotia Legislature (2024). "Electoral History for Cape Breton West" (PDF). nslegislature.ca.

== See also ==
- List of Nova Scotia provincial electoral districts
- Canadian provincial electoral districts
