= John Smith MacIvor =

Lawyer and political figure in Nova Scotia, Canada

MLA for Cape Breton South
- In office 1945–1956
- Preceded by: Donald C. MacDonald
- Succeeded by: Donald C. MacNeil

Speaker of the Nova Scotia House of Assembly
- In office 1954–1956
- Preceded by: W. S. Kennedy Jones
- Succeeded by: Gordon E. Romkey

Personal details
- Born: March 27, 1913 Glace Bay, Nova Scotia, Canada
- Died: June 12, 1957 (aged 44) Sydney River, Nova Scotia, Canada
- Party: Liberal
- Occupation: lawyer

John Smith MacIvor (March 27, 1913 – June 12, 1957) was a lawyer and political figure in Nova Scotia, Canada. He represented Cape Breton South in the Nova Scotia House of Assembly from 1945 to 1956 as a Liberal member.

He was born in Glace Bay, Nova Scotia, the son of Malcolm MacIvor and Catherine Smith. He was educated at Acadia University and Dalhousie University. MacIvor practiced law in Sydney and served as provincial magistrate from 1942 to 1945. He was chosen as speaker for the provincial assembly in 1954.
