= Jon Carey =

Canadian politician

MLA for Kings West
- In office 1999–2003
- Preceded by: George Moody
- Succeeded by: Leo Glavine

Personal details
- Born: Jon Charles Carey; February 19, 1946 (age 80) Aylesford, Nova Scotia
- Party: Progressive Conservative

Jon Charles Carey (born February 19, 1946) is a Canadian politician. He represented the electoral district of Kings West in the Nova Scotia House of Assembly from 1999 to 2003. He was a member of the Progressive Conservative Party of Nova Scotia.

Carey was born in 1946 at Aylesford, Nova Scotia. He is a former teacher, and farm equipment business owner in Aylesford. Prior to entering provincial politics, he spent 21 years as chief of the Aylesford Volunteer Fire Department. In the 1999 election, he was elected MLA for Kings West defeating his closest opponent by almost 1,700 votes. He was defeated by Liberal Leo Glavine when he ran for re-election in 2003.

In the 2004 federal election, Carey attempted a political comeback running for the Conservative Party in the West Nova riding. He was defeated by Liberal incumbent Robert Thibault by more than 4,000 votes.
