= George M. Mitchell =

Canadian politician

The Honourable George M. Mitchell ECNS
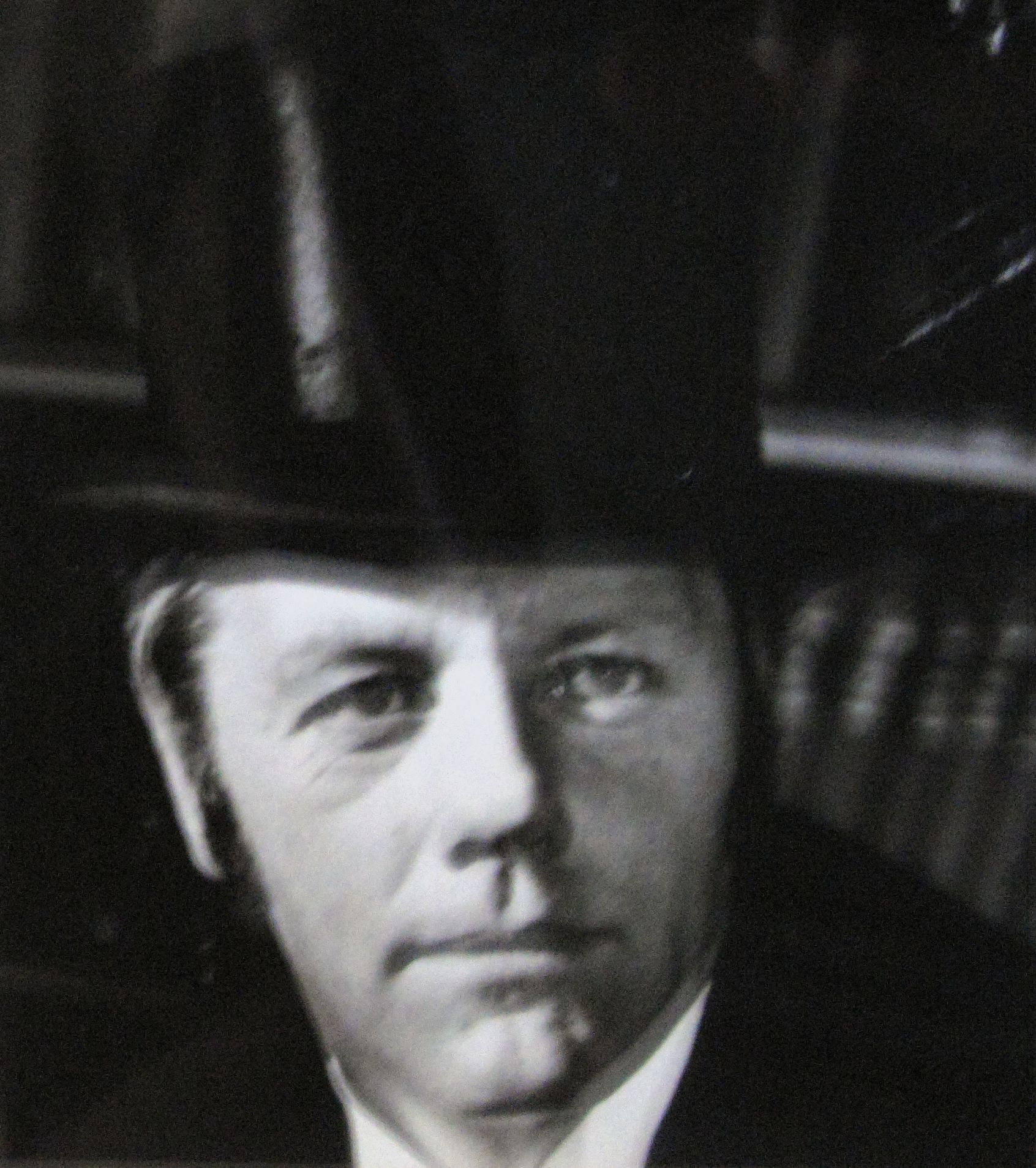
- Mitchell, c. 1973

Halifax Cornwallis
- In office 1970–1978
- Preceded by: Richard Donahoe
- Succeeded by: Terry Donahoe

Speaker of the House of Assembly of Nova Scotia
- In office 1970–1973
- Preceded by: G. H. (Paddy) Fitzgerald
- Succeeded by: James L. Connolly

Personal details
- Born: August 8, 1932 (age 93) Halifax, Nova Scotia
- Party: Liberal
- Occupation: lawyer

George MacGregor Mitchell (born August 8, 1932) is a lawyer and former political figure in Nova Scotia. He represented Halifax Cornwallis in the Nova Scotia House of Assembly from 1970 to 1978 as a Liberal.

He was born in Halifax, Nova Scotia, the son of George M. Mitchell and Jane Graham, and was educated at Dalhousie University and McGill University. In 1956, he married Diane Marion Walker.

Mitchell entered provincial politics in the 1970 election, defeating Progressive Conservative cabinet minister Richard Donahoe by over 1400 votes in Halifax Cornwallis. He was re-elected in the 1974 election, defeating Progressive Conservative George Cooper by over 1500 votes. In the 1978 election, Mitchell was defeated by Progressive Conservative Terry Donahoe. Mitchell served as speaker for the Nova Scotia assembly from 1970 to 1973, when he was appointed to the Executive Council of Nova Scotia as Minister of Development. He was named Minister of Education in 1976.
