= David Muise =

Canadian politician (1949–2017)

Mayor of Cape Breton Regional Municipality, Nova Scotia
- In office 1997–2000
- Preceded by: John Coady
- Succeeded by: John W. Morgan

MLA for Cape Breton West
- In office 1978–1981
- Preceded by: Ossie Fraser
- Succeeded by: "Big" Donnie MacLeod

Personal details
- Born: September 22, 1949 Sydney, Nova Scotia
- Died: November 2, 2017 (aged 68) Sydney, Nova Scotia
- Party: Liberal
- Occupation: Lawyer

David Nelson Muise (September 22, 1949 – November 2, 2017) was a Canadian politician. He was mayor of the Cape Breton Regional Municipality, Nova Scotia from 1997 to 2000. He also represented the electoral district of Cape Breton West in the Nova Scotia House of Assembly from 1978 to 1981. He was a member of the Nova Scotia Liberal Party.

== Early life and education ==
Born in 1949 at Sydney, Nova Scotia, Muise was a graduate of Mount Allison University (B.A.), and Dalhousie University (LL.B).

== Political career ==
He entered provincial politics in the 1978 election, winning the Cape Breton West riding. He was defeated by Progressive Conservative "Big" Donnie MacLeod when he ran for re-election in 1981. Muise served as solicitor and clerk for Cape Breton County prior to municipal amalgamation in 1995. He entered municipal politics in 1997, when he was elected mayor of the Cape Breton Regional Municipality. He served a three-year term as mayor, before being defeated by John W. Morgan in October 2000.

== Death ==
Muise died on November 2, 2017.
