= Allan Sullivan =

Canadian politician

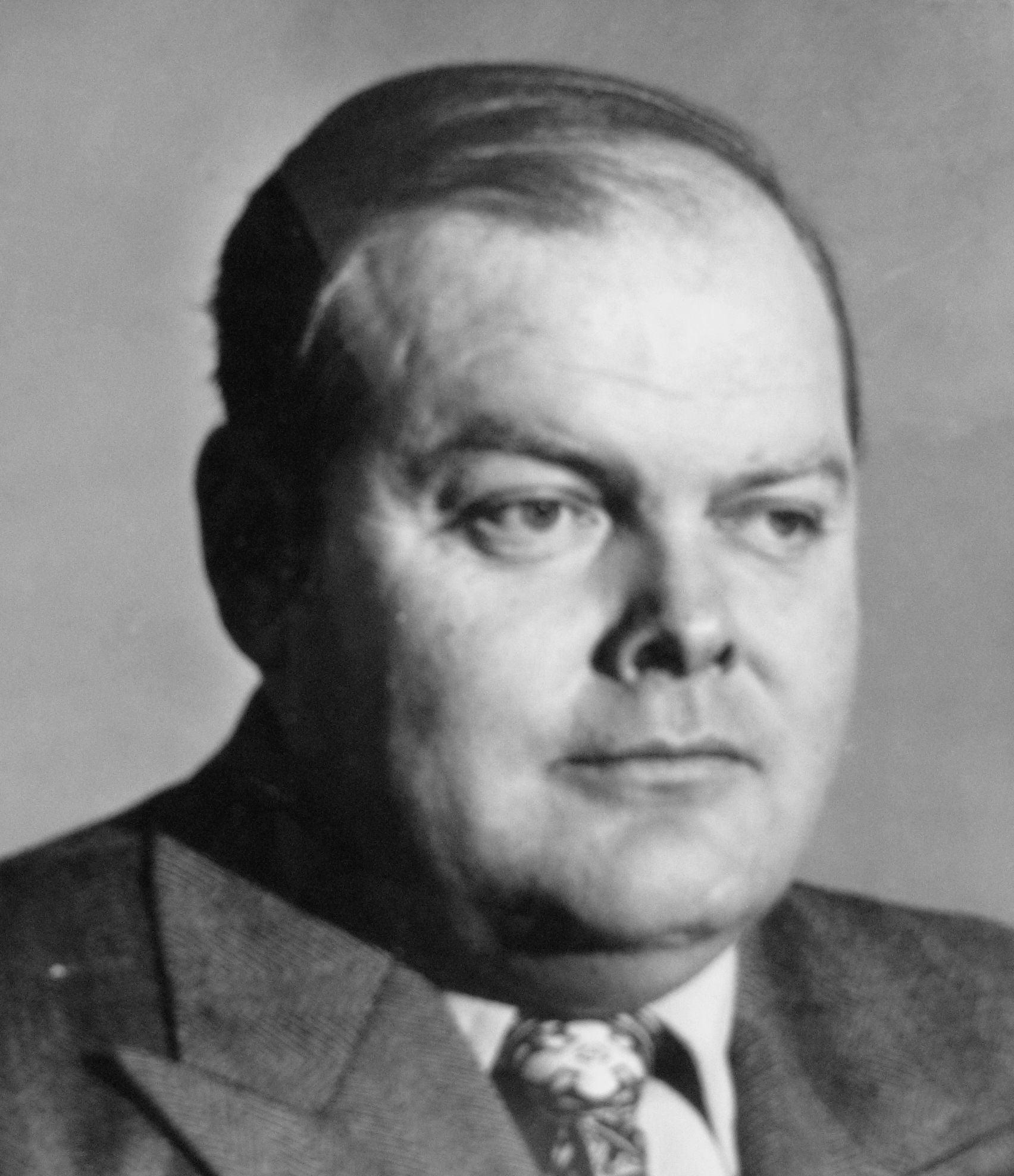

MLA for Cape Breton West
- In office 1970–1976
- Preceded by: Edward Manson
- Succeeded by: Ossie Fraser

Personal details
- Born: June 23, 1932 New Glasgow, Nova Scotia
- Died: June 19, 1982 (aged 49) Sydney, Nova Scotia
- Party: Nova Scotia Liberal Party
- Occupation: lawyer

Allan Edmund Sullivan, QC (June 23, 1932 – June 19, 1982) was a Canadian politician. He represented the electoral district of Cape Breton West in the Nova Scotia House of Assembly from 1970 to 1976. He was a member of the Nova Scotia Liberal Party.

Sullivan was born in New Glasgow, Nova Scotia. He attended Dalhousie University, earning a Bachelor of Laws degree in 1956. He was a lawyer and member of the Queen's Counsel. In 1956, he married Dawn Christina Simpson. He served in the Executive Council of Nova Scotia as Minister of Mines, Minister of Public Welfare, Minister of Education and Attorney General. He resigned his seat in 1976 when he was appointed a judge. Sullivan died in Sydney in 1982.
