= George Moody =

Canadian politician

The Honourable George Moody ECNS

MLA for Kings West
- In office 1978–1999
- Preceded by: Frank Bezanson
- Succeeded by: Jon Carey

Personal details
- Born: August 3, 1942 (age 83) Kentville, Nova Scotia
- Party: Progressive Conservative

George Clifford Moody (born August 3, 1942) is a former Canadian politician. He represented the electoral district of Kings West in the Nova Scotia House of Assembly from 1978 to 1999. He was a member of the Progressive Conservative Party of Nova Scotia.

Born in 1942 at Kentville, Nova Scotia, Moody graduated from the Nova Scotia Teachers College. He was a school principal when he entered provincial politics, defeating Liberal incumbent Frank Bezanson to win the Kings West riding in the 1978 election. He was re-elected in the 1981, 1984, and 1988 elections. Moody served in the Executive Council of Nova Scotia as Minister of Environment, Chairman of the Management Board, Minister of Government Services, Minister of Transportation, and Minister of Health.

In the 1993 election, the Progressive Conservatives were reduced to nine seats, losing government to the Liberals, however in Kings West, Moody was re-elected by over 1,700 votes. Considered a potential leadership candidate, Moody declined to enter the 1995 leadership race. Moody was re-elected in the 1998 election by almost 3,400 votes. On June 19, 1999, Moody announced that he was retiring from politics and not seeking re-election in the 1999 election.
