= Leo Glavine =

Canadian politician

The Honourable Leo Glavine ECNS
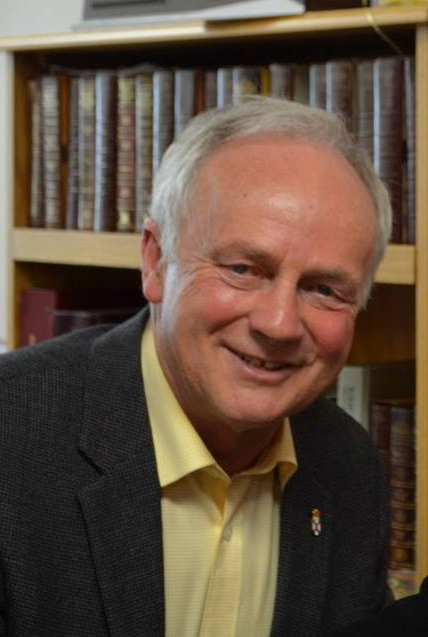
- Leo Glavine, MLA

Member of the Nova Scotia House of Assembly for Kings West
- In office August 5, 2003 – July 17, 2021
- Preceded by: Jon Carey
- Succeeded by: Chris Palmer

Personal details
- Born: 1948 Grand Falls-Windsor, Newfoundland and Labrador
- Party: Liberal
- Spouse: Doris
- Occupation: Teacher, Administrator, Coach, Community Volunteer, Politician

Leo A. Glavine (born 1948) is a Canadian politician, who represented the electoral district of Kings West in the Nova Scotia House of Assembly from 2003 until his retirement from politics in 2021. He is a member of the Nova Scotia Liberal Party.

== Early life ==
Glavine was born in Grand Falls-Windsor, Newfoundland and Labrador. He graduated from St. Francis Xavier University. Spent 30 years working at West Kings District High School in Auburn, Nova Scotia, as a public school teacher and high school administrator.

== Political career ==
Glavine ran for the Liberal nomination in the riding of Kings West in 2003. He was elected in the 2003 provincial election and subsequently re-elected in the 2006, 2009, 2013 and 2017 provincial elections.

On October 22, 2013, Glavine was appointed to the Executive Council of Nova Scotia where he served as Minister of Health and Wellness, Minister of Seniors and the Chair of the Senior Citizens’ Secretariat.

On June 15, 2017, premier Stephen McNeil shuffled his cabinet, moving Glavine to Minister of Communities, Culture and Heritage, Minister of Seniors, and Minister of the Voluntary Sector.

== Electoral record ==
2017 Nova Scotia general election
Party	Candidate	Votes	%	±%
Liberal	Leo Glavine	4,190	52.45	-21.86
Progressive Conservative	Chris Palmer	3,015	37.74	21.65
New Democratic Party	Cheryl Burbidge	536	6.71	-0.9
Green	Madeline Taylor	247	3.09	+2.10

2013 Nova Scotia general election
Party	Candidate	Votes	%	±%
Liberal	Leo Glavine	5,890	74.31	+13.46
Progressive Conservative	Jody Alan Frowley	1,275	16.09	-4.22
New Democratic Party	Robert K. (Bob) Landry	603	7.61	-9.42
Green	Barbara G. Lake	158	1.99	+0.18

2009 Nova Scotia general election
Party	Candidate	Votes	%	±%
Liberal	Leo Glavine	4,996	60.85	
Progressive Conservative	Chris Palmer	1,668	20.31	
New Democratic Party	Carol Tobin	1,398	17.03	
Green	Nistal Prem de Boer	149	1.81	–

2006 Nova Scotia general election
Party	Candidate	Votes	%	±%
Liberal	Leo Glavine	3940	46.67	
Progressive Conservative	John Prall	2801	33.18	
New Democratic Party	Greg Hubbert	1590	18.83	
Green	Nistal Prem de Boer	112	1.33	–

2003 Nova Scotia general election
Party	Candidate	Votes	%	±%
Liberal	Leo Glavine	3045	36.91	
Progressive Conservative	Jon Carey	2935	35.58	
New Democratic Party	Greg Hubbert	2269	27.51	

== Personal life ==
He is married and has three sons.
