= Terry Donahoe =

Canadian politician

MLA for Halifax Cornwallis
- In office 1978–1993
- Preceded by: George M. Mitchell
- Succeeded by: riding dissolved

MLA for Halifax Citadel
- In office 1993–1997
- Preceded by: Art Donahoe
- Succeeded by: Ed Kinley

Personal details
- Born: Terence Richard Boyd Donahoe; October 30, 1944; Halifax, Nova Scotia
- Died: November 29, 2005 (aged 61); Halifax, Nova Scotia
- Political party: Progressive Conservative

Terence Richard Boyd Donahoe (October 30, 1944 – November 29, 2005) was a Nova Scotia opposition leader, cabinet minister, and MLA.

== Early life and education ==
Terry Donahoe was born in Halifax on October 30, 1944. His father Richard was Mayor of Halifax, served in the provincial cabinet as Minister of Public Health and Welfare and Attorney General and was a Senator. Donahoe's older brother Art was also an MLA and served as Speaker of the House of Assembly of Nova Scotia.

Donahoe was educated at St. Mary's High School in Halifax, after which he went to Saint Mary's University. He graduated in 1964 and then attended Dalhousie Law School. After completing his law degree, he joined the Halifax law firm of Blois, Nickerson, Palmeter and Bryson in 1967.

== Political career ==
He was elected to the Nova Scotia House of Assembly in the 1978 provincial election as a Progressive Conservative, serving for 19 years. He represented Halifax Cornwallis from 1978 to 1993, then Halifax Citadel (succeeding his brother Art) until he resigned in 1997 to run federally.

In Cabinet, he served in several posts, including Education, Tourism and Culture, Environment, Labour, Attorney General and Chair of the Management Board. He held the education portfolio for eight years. In that ministry, he was a strong supporter of the public education system, pushing for more money for schools and championing new programs. He also amalgamated the several hundred school boards into just under thirty, and introduced the first Acadian school board, precursor of the present-day Provincial Acadian School Board. The Education Act of 1981 gave legal recognition to the category of "Acadian schools" where French is taught as a first language and where French is used as a language of instruction.

When Premier Donald Cameron stepped down on election night after the Conservatives' were defeated in 1993, Donahoe was named interim leader of the Progressive Conservatives and leader of the official opposition. In this capacity, he was credited with providing direction and holding together a demoralized caucus in disarray. He served for two years before being succeeded by John Hamm who later led the party to power in the 1999 provincial election.

In the 1997 federal election, he ran for the Progressive Conservatives in Halifax. That campaign was a three way race which saw New Democratic Party leader Alexa McDonough get elected, while Donahoe finished second, ahead of Liberal incumbent, Mary Clancy.

=== Electoral record ===
1997 Canadian federal election: Halifax
Party	Candidate	Votes	%	±%
New Democratic	Alexa McDonough	21,837	49.02	+36.80
Progressive Conservative	Terry Donahoe	10,361	23.26	+1.63
Liberal	Mary Clancy	9,638	21.64	-25.78
Reform	Steve Greene	2,422	5.44	-8.31
Natural Law	Gilles Bigras	197	0.44	
Marxist–Leninist	Tony Seed	89	0.20	
Total valid votes		44,544	99.44	
Total rejected, unmarked and declined ballots		252	0.56	
Turnout		44,796	68.85	
Eligible voters		65,061		
New Democratic notional gain from Liberal		Swing		+31.29

== Honours ==
In 1985, Donahoe was awarded an honorary doctorate in education from l'Université Sainte-Anne. In 2001, he received an Honorary Doctor of Laws from Saint Mary's University. Donahoe also donated a plaque commemorating the connection between Saint Mary's and the Charitable Irish Society.

== Death ==
Donahoe died of cancer on November 29, 2005, at the age of 61.
