= Frank Bezanson =

Canadian politician

Frank C. Bezanson
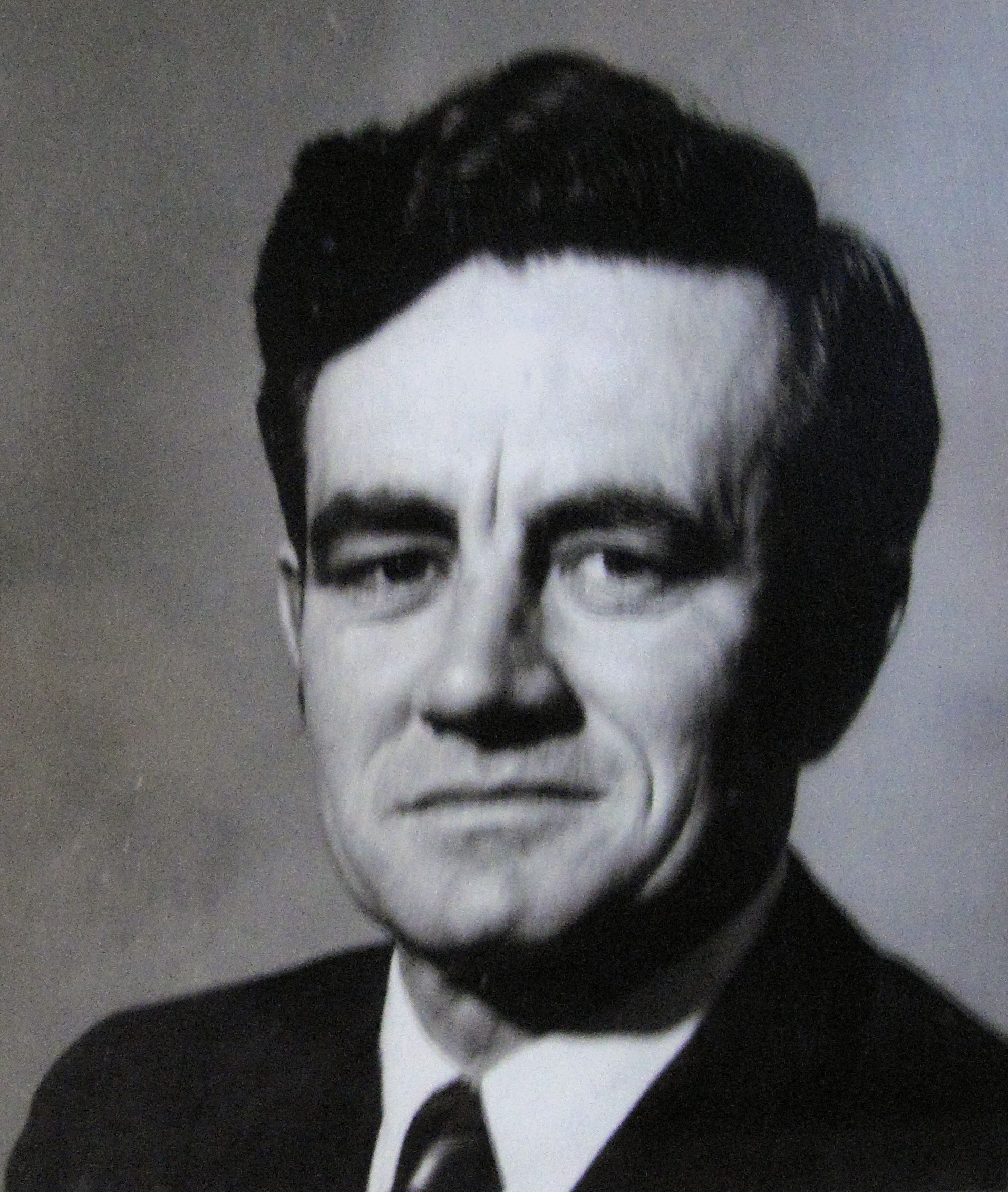
- Bezanson, c. 1973

MLA for Kings West
- In office 1971–1978
- Preceded by: Gordon Tidman
- Succeeded by: George Moody

Personal details
- Born: August 31, 1928 Westville, Nova Scotia, Canada
- Died: November 10, 1993 (aged 65) Toronto, Ontario, Canada
- Party: Liberal
- Occupation: Insurance agent

Frank Curwin Bezanson (August 31, 1928 – November 10, 1993) was a Canadian politician. He represented the electoral district of Kings West in the Nova Scotia House of Assembly from 1971 to 1978. He was a member of the Nova Scotia Liberal Party.

Bezanson was born in Westville, Nova Scotia and was educated there. He was an insurance agent. In 1948, he married Wanda Alice Banks. Bezanson made his first attempt at entering provincial politics in the 1967 election, but lost to Progressive Conservative Gordon Tidman by 97 votes. He ran again in the 1970 election, with Tidman winning the seat on election night by 16 votes. However a recount resulted in a tie with both Bezanson and Tidman receiving 3735 votes. The returning officer cast the deciding vote for Tidman, declaring him the winner. The Liberals appealed the result and a judge declared the vote null and void and ordered a by-election. On November 16, 1971, Bezanson won the by-election, defeating Progressive Conservative Fred Chisholm by 323 votes. Bezanson was re-elected in the 1974 election. He was defeated by Progressive Conservative George Moody when he ran for re-election in the 1978 election. He died in Toronto, Ontario on November 10, 1993.
