= Grand Mira South =

Community in Nova Scotia, Canada

Coordinates: 45°53′18.87″N 60°17′22.33″W

Grand Mira South, in Nova Scotia

Grand Mira South is a community in the Canadian province of Nova Scotia, located in the Cape Breton Regional Municipality on Cape Breton Island.

Grand Mira South was hit by a tornado on August 7, 2016.
