= Donald C. MacNeil =

Canadian politician

MLA for Cape Breton South
- In office 1956–1970
- Preceded by: John Smith MacIvor
- Succeeded by: John Francis Burke

Personal details
- Born: January 4, 1924 Sydney, Nova Scotia
- Died: October 24, 1978 (aged 54) Sydney, Nova Scotia
- Party: Progressive Conservative
- Occupation: Lawyer

Donald Campbell MacNeil (January 4, 1924 – October 24, 1978) was a Canadian politician. He represented the electoral district of Cape Breton South in the Nova Scotia House of Assembly from 1956 to 1970. He is a member of the Nova Scotia Progressive Conservative Party.

MacNeil was born in Sydney, Nova Scotia. He attended Acadia University, St. Francis Xavier University, and Dalhousie University. He earned a Bachelor of Laws from Dalhousie in 1948 and went into law practice. In 1948, he married Marguerite Shirley Cameron. He served in the Executive Council of Nova Scotia as Minister of Municipal Affairs.
