= Ossie Fraser =

Canadian politician

Osborne Fraser

MLA for Cape Breton West
- In office September 7, 1976 – September 19, 1978
- Preceded by: Allan Sullivan
- Succeeded by: David Muise

MLA for Cape Breton The Lakes
- In office September 19, 1978 – October 29, 1982
- Preceded by: new riding
- Succeeded by: John Newell

Personal details
- Born: November 7, 1923 Edwardsville, Nova Scotia
- Died: October 29, 1982 (aged 58) Sydney, Nova Scotia
- Party: Liberal
- Occupation: Steelworker

Osborne 'Ossie' McKenzie Fraser, (November 7, 1923 – October 29, 1982) was a politician in Nova Scotia, Canada. Born in Edwardsville, he was the son of Ernest Osborne and Mary Catherine Fraser.

Fraser worked as a steel worker with Sydney Steel Corporation (SYSCO) for 35 years. He was elected to the Cape Breton County Council in 1964 before moving into provincial politics. He was first elected to the Nova Scotia House of Assembly in a 1976 byelection in the Cape Breton West riding. He was re-elected in the new riding of Cape Breton The Lakes in the 1978 and 1981 provincial elections. He served as a member of the Nova Scotia Liberal Party until he died suddenly on October 29, 1982. Fraser was also a veteran of World War II. He was married to Mary Ruth Briscoe.
