= Gaston LeBlanc =

Canadian politician

Gaston T. LeBlanc

MLA for Richmond
- In office 1974–1980
- Preceded by: Gerald Doucet
- Succeeded by: John E. LeBrun

Personal details
- Born: August 1, 1941 West Arichat, Nova Scotia
- Died: February 15, 1980 (aged 38)
- Party: Liberal
- Occupation: Engineer

Gaston Thomas LeBlanc (August 1, 1941 – February 15, 1980) was a Canadian politician. He represented the electoral district of Richmond in the Nova Scotia House of Assembly from 1974 to 1980. He was a member of the Nova Scotia Liberal Party.

Born in 1941 in West Arichat, Nova Scotia, LeBlanc graduated from the Nova Scotia Technical College with an engineering degree. LeBlanc entered provincial politics in the 1974 election, winning the Richmond riding by over 1500 votes. He was re-elected in 1978. LeBlanc died in office on February 15, 1980.
