= Malcolm A. Patterson =

Canadian politician

Malcolm Alexander Patterson (January 18, 1890 – January 21, 1965) was a lawyer and political figure in Nova Scotia, Canada. He represented Cape Breton West in the Nova Scotia House of Assembly from 1937 to 1956 as a Liberal member.

He was born in Sydney, Nova Scotia, the son of Alexander Patterson and Jeanie McKenzie. He was educated at the Sydney Academy and Dalhousie University, where he studied law. Patterson set up practice in Sydney. In 1920, he married Georgina Isabel Ross. Patterson served as Crown Prosecutor for Cape Breton County from 1921 to 1925 and from 1935 to 1952. He was a member of the province's Executive Council, serving as provincial secretary from 1947 to 1951, as Minister of Mines from 1947 to 1949, as Minister of Municipal Affairs in 1949 and as Attorney General from 1949 to 1953. Patterson was defeated when he ran for reelection in 1956.

Patterson died at Sydney on January 21, 1965.
