= Vince MacLean =

Canadian politician

The Honourable Vincent MacLean ECNS

Cape Breton South
- In office 1974–1993
- Preceded by: John Burke
- Succeeded by: Manning MacDonald

Speaker of the House of Assembly of Nova Scotia
- In office 1974–1976
- Preceded by: James L. Connolly
- Succeeded by: George Doucet

Personal details
- Born: December 8, 1944 (age 81) Sydney, Nova Scotia
- Party: Liberal
- Occupation: teacher

Vincent James MacLean (born December 8, 1944) was leader of the Nova Scotia Liberal Party in 1985 and again from 1986 to 1992. He was replaced by John Savage.

He was born in Sydney, Nova Scotia on Cape Breton Island, the son of Joseph W. MacLean and Marguerite MacNeil. MacLean grew up and lives in Sydney. He was educated at Sydney Academy, St. Francis Xavier University, the University of New Brunswick and Saint Mary's University. He served in the Canadian Officers' Training Corps at CFB Shilo in Manitoba from 1964 to 1966. In 1968, he married Natalie Furdas. He was a high school teacher at Sydney Academy before being elected as a Member of the Legislative Assembly (MLA) in 1974.

He represented the riding of Cape Breton South from 1974 until 1993. MacLean was speaker for the assembly from 1974 to 1976, when he was named to the cabinet as Minister of Lands and Forests and Minister of Environment. He later served as mayor of Sydney. In 1997, MacLean sought election to Parliament as a Liberal candidate in the newly created federal riding of Sydney—Victoria, but was defeated by Peter Mancini of the New Democratic Party.

== Electoral record ==
1997 Canadian federal election: Sydney—Victoria
| Party | Candidate | Votes | % |
|---|---|---|---|
| New Democratic | Peter Mancini | 22,455 | 51.1 |
| Liberal | Vince MacLean | 11,569 | 26.3 |
| Progressive Conservative | Cecil Clarke | 9,920 | 22.6 |
| Total valid votes | | 43,944 | 100.0 |
