= List of premiers of Nova Scotia =

Premier of Nova Scotia
- Coat of arms of Nova Scotia
- Incumbent; Tim Houston since August 31, 2021
- Seat: Halifax
- Formation: 1867

The Canadian province of Nova Scotia was a British colony with a system of responsible government since 1848, before it joined Canadian Confederation in 1867. Since Confederation, the province has been a part of the Canadian federation and has kept its own legislature to deal with provincial matters.

Nova Scotia has a unicameral Westminster-style parliamentary government, in which the premier is the leader of the party that controls the most seats in the House of Assembly. The premier is Nova Scotia's head of government, and the king in right of Nova Scotia is its head of state and is represented by the lieutenant governor of Nova Scotia. The premier picks a cabinet from the elected members to form the Executive Council of Nova Scotia, and presides over that body.

Members are first elected to the House during general elections. General elections must be conducted every five years from the date of the last election, but the premier may ask for early dissolution of the Legislative Assembly. An election may also occur if the governing party loses the confidence of the legislature by the defeat of a supply bill or tabling of a confidence motion. Nova Scotia has had 27 individuals serve as premier since Confederation, of which 12 were Conservatives, 14 were Liberals, and one New Democrat.

Two premiers of Nova Scotia later became prime minister of Canada, John Sparrow David Thompson and Charles Tupper.

== Premiers of Nova Scotia ==
No.	Portrait	Name (Birth–Death)	Term of office	Electoral mandates (Assembly)	Political party	Parliamentary seat
Premiers of the pre-Confederation period
1		James Boyle Uniacke (1799–1858)	2 February 1848 – 4 April 1854	1847 election (18th Leg.) 1851 election (19th Leg.)	Liberal	MLA for Cape Breton County
2 (1 of 2)		William Young (1799–1887)	4 April 1854 – 24 February 1857	Appointment (19th Leg.) 1855 election (20th Leg.)	Liberal	MLA for Inverness County
3 (1 of 2)		James William Johnston (1792–1873)	24 February 1857 – 10 February 1860	1859 election (22nd Leg.)	Conservative	MLA for Annapolis County
4 (2 of 2)		William Young (1799–1887)	10 February 1860 – 3 August 1860	Appointment (22nd Leg.)	Liberal	MLA for Inverness County
5		Joseph Howe (1804–1873)	3 August 1860 – 11 June 1863	Appointment (22nd Leg.)	Liberal	MLA for Hants County, South Division
6 (2 of 2)		James William Johnston (1792–1873)	11 June 1863 – 11 May 1864	1863 election (23rd Leg.)	Conservative	MLA for Annapolis County
7		Charles Tupper (1821–1915)	11 May 1864 – 4 July 1867	Appointment (23rd Leg.)	Confederation	MLA for Cumberland County
Premiers of the post-Confederation period
1		Hiram Blanchard (1820–1874)	4 July 1867 – 7 November 1867	Appointment (caretaker government)	Conservative (Ldr. 1867)	MLA for Inverness County
2		William Annand (1808–1887)	7 November 1867 – 11 May 1875	1867 election (24th Leg.) 1871 election (25th Leg.) 1874 election (26th Leg.)	Anti-Confederation (Ldr. 1867)	Councillor for province-at-large
3		Philip Carteret Hill (1821–1894)	11 May 1875 – 22 October 1878	Appointment (26th Leg.)	Liberal (Ldr. 1875)	MLA for Halifax County
4		Simon Hugh Holmes (1831–1919)	22 October 1878 – 25 May 1882	1878 election (27th Leg.)	Conservative (Ldr. 1874)	MLA for Pictou County
5		John Sparrow David Thompson (1845–1894)	25 May 1882 – 3 August 1882	Appointment (caretaker government)	Conservative (Ldr. 1882)	MLA for Antigonish County
6		William Thomas Pipes (1850–1909)	3 August 1882 – 28 July 1884	1882 election (28th Leg.)	Liberal (Ldr. 1882)	MLA for Cumberland County
7		William Stevens Fielding (1848–1929)	28 July 1884 – 20 July 1896	Appointment (28th Leg.) 1886 election (29th Leg.) 1890 election (30th Leg.) 1894 election (31st Leg.)	Liberal (Ldr. 1883)	MLA for Halifax County
8		George Henry Murray (1861–1929)	20 July 1896 – 24 January 1923	Appointment (31st Leg.) 1897 election (32nd Leg.) 1901 election (33rd Leg.) 1906 election (34th Leg.) 1911 election (35th Leg.) 1916 election (36th Leg.) 1920 election (37th Leg.)	Liberal (Ldr. 1896)	MLA for Victoria County
9		Ernest Howard Armstrong (1864–1946)	24 January 1923 – 16 July 1925	Appointment (37th Leg.)	Liberal (Ldr. 1923)	MLA for Shelburne County
10		Edgar Nelson Rhodes (1877–1942)	16 July 1925 – 11 August 1930	1925 election (38th Leg.) 1928 election (39th Leg.)	Conservative (Ldr. 1925)	MLA for Hants County
11		Gordon Sidney Harrington (1883–1943)	11 August 1930 – 5 September 1933	Appointment (39th Leg.)	Conservative (Ldr. 1930)	MLA for Cape Breton Centre
12 (1 of 2)		Angus L. Macdonald (1890–1954)	5 September 1933 – 10 July 1940	1933 election (40th Leg.) 1937 election (41st Leg.)	Liberal (Ldr. 1930)	MLA for Halifax South
13		Alexander Stirling MacMillan (1871–1955)	10 July 1940 – 8 September 1945	Appointment (41st Leg.) 1941 election (42nd Leg.)	Liberal (Ldr. 1940)	MLA for Hants
14 (2 of 2)		Angus L. Macdonald (1890–1954)	8 September 1945 – 13 April 1954	Appointment (42nd Leg.) 1945 election (43rd Leg.) 1949 election (44th Leg.) 1953 election (45th Leg.)	Liberal (Ldr. 1945)	MLA for Halifax South
15		Harold Connolly (1901–1980)	13 April 1954 – 30 September 1954	Appointment (45th Leg.)	Liberal (Ldr. 1954)	MLA for Halifax North
16		Henry Hicks (1915–1990)	30 September 1954 – 20 November 1956	Appointment (45th Leg.)	Liberal (Ldr. 1954)	MLA for Annapolis
17		Robert Stanfield (1914–2003)	20 November 1956 – 13 September 1967	1956 election (46th Leg.) 1960 election (47th Leg.) 1963 election (48th Leg.) 1967 election (49th Leg.)	Progressive Conservative (Ldr. 1948)	MLA for Colchester
18		George Isaac Smith (1909–1982)	13 September 1967 – 28 October 1970	Appointment (49th Leg.)	Progressive Conservative (Ldr. 1967)	MLA for Colchester
19		Gerald Regan (1928–2019)	28 October 1970 – 5 October 1978	1970 election (50th Leg.) 1974 election (51st Leg.)	Liberal (Ldr. 1965)	MLA for Halifax Needham
20		John Buchanan (1931–2019)	5 October 1978 – 12 September 1990	1978 election (52nd Leg.) 1981 election (53rd Leg.) 1984 election (54th Leg.) 1988 election (55th Leg.)	Progressive Conservative (Ldr. 1971)	MLA for Halifax Atlantic
21		Roger Stuart Bacon (1926–2021)	12 September 1990 – 26 February 1991	Appointment (55th Leg.)	Progressive Conservative (Ldr. 1990)	MLA for Cumberland East
22		Donald William Cameron (1946–2021)	26 February 1991 – 11 June 1993	Appointment (55th Leg.)	Progressive Conservative (Ldr. 1991)	MLA for Pictou East
23		John Savage (1932–2003)	11 June 1993 – 18 July 1997	1993 election (56th Leg.)	Liberal (Ldr. 1992)	MLA for Dartmouth South
24		Russell MacLellan (b. 1940)	18 July 1997 – 16 August 1999	Appointment (56th Leg.) 1998 election (57th Leg.)	Liberal (Ldr. 1997)	MLA for Cape Breton North
25		John F. Hamm (1938–2026)	16 August 1999 – 24 February 2006	1999 election (58th Leg.) 2003 election (59th Leg.)	Progressive Conservative (Ldr. 1995)	MLA for Pictou Centre
26		Rodney MacDonald (b. 1972)	24 February 2006 – 19 June 2009	Appointment (59th Leg.) 2006 election (60th Leg.)	Progressive Conservative (Ldr. 2006)	MLA for Inverness
27		Darrell Dexter (b. 1957)	19 June 2009 – 22 October 2013	2009 election (61st Leg.)	New Democratic (Ldr. 2001)	MLA for Cole Harbour
28		Stephen McNeil (b. 1964)	22 October 2013 – 23 February 2021	2013 election (62nd Leg.) 2017 election (63rd Leg.)	Liberal (Ldr. 2007)	MLA for Annapolis
29		Iain Rankin (b. 1983)	23 February 2021 – 31 August 2021	Appointment (63rd Leg.)	Liberal (Ldr. 2021)	MLA for Timberlea-Prospect
30		Tim Houston (b. 1970)	31 August 2021 – incumbent	2021 election (64th Leg.) 2024 election (65th Leg.)	Progressive Conservative (Ldr. 2018)	MLA for Pictou East
