= Pictou (provincial electoral district) =

Former provincial electoral district in Nova Scotia, Canada

Nova Scotia electoral district

Defunct provincial electoral district
- Legislature: Nova Scotia House of Assembly
- District created: 1867
- District abolished: 1949
- Last contested: 1945

Pictou was a provincial electoral district in Nova Scotia, Canada, that, at the time of its dissolution, elected two members to the Nova Scotia House of Assembly. It existed from 1867 to 1949, at which time Pictou County was divided into the three electoral districts of: Pictou East, Pictou West, and Pictou Centre.

Prior to 1933, Pictou elected three members to the Nova Scotia Legislature.

== Members of the Legislative Assembly ==
Pictou elected the following members to the Legislature:

Legislature	Years	Member	Party	Member	Party
43rd	1947–1949	seat declared vacant		Alfred B. DeWolfe	Liberal
43rd	1945–1947	Josiah H. MacQuarrie	Liberal	Alfred B. DeWolfe	Liberal
42nd	1941–1945	Josiah H. MacQuarrie	Liberal	Ernest G. Irish	Progressive Conservative
41st	1937–1941	Josiah H. MacQuarrie	Liberal	Newton G. Munro	Liberal
40th	1933–1937	Josiah H. MacQuarrie	Liberal	Donald F. Fraser	Liberal

Prior to 1933, Pictou elected three members to the Nova Scotia Legislature:

Legislature	Years	Member	Party	Member	Party	Member	Party
39th	1928–1933	John Doull	Liberal Conservative	Hugh A. MacQuarrie	Liberal Conservative	Robert A. Douglas	Liberal Conservative
38th	1925–1928	John Doull	Liberal Conservative	Hugh A. MacQuarrie	Liberal Conservative	Robert A. Douglas	Liberal Conservative
37th	1920–1925	Robert M. McGregor	Liberal	John Welsford Macdonald	Liberal	Robert Henry Graham	Liberal
36th	1916–1920	Robert M. McGregor	Liberal	Robert Hugh MacKay	Liberal	Robert Henry Graham	Liberal
35th	1911–1916	Robert M. McGregor	Liberal	Robert Hugh MacKay	Liberal	Charles E. Tanner	Liberal Conservative
34th	1909–1911	Robert M. McGregor	Liberal	Robert Hugh MacKay	Liberal	John M. Baillie	Liberal Conservative
34th	1906–1909	Robert M. McGregor	Liberal	Charles E. Tanner	Liberal Conservative	John M. Baillie	Liberal Conservative
33rd	1904–1906	Robert M. McGregor	Liberal	Charles E. Tanner	Liberal Conservative	Edward M. Macdonald	Liberal
33rd	1901–1904	George Patterson	Liberal	Charles E. Tanner	Liberal Conservative	Edward M. Macdonald	Liberal
32nd	1900–1901	Matthew Henry Fitzpatrick	Liberal Conservative	Charles E. Tanner	Liberal Conservative	Edward M. Macdonald	Liberal
32nd	1897–1900	Matthew Henry Fitzpatrick	Liberal Conservative	James D. McGregor	Liberal	Edward M. Macdonald	Liberal
31st	1894–1897	William Cameron	Liberal Conservative	Charles E. Tanner	Liberal Conservative	Alexander Grant	Liberal Conservative
30th	1890–1894	William Cameron	Liberal Conservative	James D. McGregor	Liberal	Alexander Grant	Liberal Conservative
29th	1887–1890	William Cameron	Liberal Conservative	Jeffrey McColl	Liberal	Charles H. Munro	Liberal Conservative
29th	1886–1887	Adam Carr Bell	Liberal Conservative	Jeffrey McColl	Liberal	Charles H. Munro	Liberal Conservative
28th	1882–1886	Adam Carr Bell	Liberal Conservative	Robert Hockin	Liberal Conservative	Charles H. Munro	Liberal Conservative
27th	1878–1882	Adam Carr Bell	Liberal Conservative	Simon Hugh Holmes	Liberal Conservative	Alexander MacKay	Liberal Conservative
26th	1874–1878	Hugh J. Cameron	Liberal Conservative	Simon Hugh Holmes	Liberal Conservative	Alexander MacKay	Liberal Conservative
25th	1872–1874	Hugh J. Cameron	Liberal Conservative	Simon Hugh Holmes	Liberal Conservative	Alexander MacKay	Liberal Conservative
25th	1871–1872	Hugh J. Cameron	Liberal Conservative	Simon Hugh Holmes	Liberal Conservative	James McDonald	Liberal Conservative
24th	1867–1871	Robert S. Copeland	Anti-Confederation	George Murray	Anti-Confederation	Martin Isaac Wilkins	Anti-Confederation

== Election results ==
=== 1933–1949: two members ===
1945 Nova Scotia general election
Party	Candidate	Votes	%	Elected
Liberal	Josiah H. MacQuarrie	10,031	27.61%	✓
Liberal	Alfred B. DeWolfe	9,020	24.83%	✓
Progressive Conservative	Ernest G. Irish	7,061	19.44%	
Progressive Conservative	John A. MacGregor	6,704	18.46%	
Co-operative Commonwealth	Donald L. Nicholson	1,688	4.65%	
Co-operative Commonwealth	G. Miller Dick	1,576	4.34%	
Labour	George J. White	245	0.67%	
Total		36,325	–	
Source(s) Source: Nova Scotia Legislature (2024). "Electoral History for Pictou County" (PDF). nslegislature.ca. Nova Scotia Legislature (1945). Returns of the General Election for the House of Assembly (PDF) (Report). Queen's Printer. Archived from the original (PDF) on 10 September 2018.

1941 Nova Scotia general election
Party	Candidate	Votes	%	Elected
Liberal	Josiah H. MacQuarrie	8,780	26.89%	✓
Progressive Conservative	Ernest G. Irish	8,256	25.28%	✓
Progressive Conservative	W. Thomas Hayden	8,055	24.67%	
Liberal	Newton G. Munro	7,562	23.16%	
Total		32,653	–	
Source(s) Source: Nova Scotia Legislature (2024). "Electoral History for Pictou County" (PDF). nslegislature.ca. Nova Scotia Legislature (1941). Returns of the General Election for the House of Assembly (PDF) (Report). Queen's Printer. Archived from the original (PDF) on 8 February 2024.

1937 Nova Scotia general election
Party	Candidate	Votes	%	Elected
Liberal	Josiah H. MacQuarrie	10,149	27.34%	✓
Liberal	Newton G. Munro	9,637	25.96%	✓
Progressive Conservative	John A. MacGregor	8,890	23.95%	
Progressive Conservative	Rod H. MacLeod	8,441	22.74%	
Total		37,117	–	
Source(s) Source: Nova Scotia Legislature (2024). "Electoral History for Pictou County" (PDF). nslegislature.ca. Nova Scotia Legislature (1937). Returns of the General Election for the House of Assembly (PDF) (Report). Queen's Printer. Archived from the original (PDF) on 1 March 2019.

1933 Nova Scotia general election
Party	Candidate	Votes	%	Elected
Liberal	Josiah H. MacQuarrie	10,887	28.15%	✓
Liberal	Donald F. Fraser	10,377	26.83%	✓
Liberal-Conservative	John W. McLeod	8,861	22.91%	
Liberal-Conservative	John Doull	8,546	22.10%	
Total		38,671	–	
Source(s) Source: Nova Scotia Legislature (2024). "Electoral History for Pictou County" (PDF). nslegislature.ca. Nova Scotia Legislature (1933). Returns of the General Election for the House of Assembly (PDF) (Report). Queen's Printer. Archived from the original (PDF) on 1 March 2019.

=== 1867–1933: three members ===
1928 Nova Scotia general election
Party	Candidate	Votes	%	Elected
Liberal-Conservative	John Doull	7,836	18.21%	✓
Liberal-Conservative	Robert Albert Douglas	7,572	17.59%	✓
Liberal-Conservative	Hugh Allan MacQuarrie	7,249	16.84%	✓
Liberal	Donald F. Fraser	7,052	16.38%	
Liberal	A. T. Logan	6,836	15.88%	
Liberal	Clifford E. Carruthers	6,498	15.10%	
Total		43,043	–	
Source(s) Source: Nova Scotia Legislature (2024). "Electoral History for Pictou County" (PDF). nslegislature.ca.

1925 Nova Scotia general election
Party	Candidate	Votes	%	Elected
Liberal-Conservative	John Doull	9,432	20.55%	✓
Liberal-Conservative	Robert Albert Douglas	9,053	19.73%	✓
Liberal-Conservative	Hugh Allan MacQuarrie	9,043	19.71%	✓
Liberal	Archibald McColl	5,591	12.18%	
Liberal	John Welsford Macdonald	5,464	11.91%	
Liberal	George W. Whitman	5,332	11.62%	
Labour	William Murray	695	1.51%	
Labour	J. G. Calkin	668	1.46%	
Labour	Joseph White	610	1.33%	
Total		45,888	–	
Source(s) Source: Nova Scotia Legislature (2024). "Electoral History for Pictou County" (PDF). nslegislature.ca.

1920 Nova Scotia general election
Party	Candidate	Votes	%	Elected
Liberal	Robert Henry Graham	6,696	17.45%	✓
Liberal	John Welsford Macdonald	6,287	16.38%	✓
Liberal	Robert M. McGregor	6,056	15.78%	✓
Labour	Henry D. Fraser	6,012	15.66%	
United Farmers	Alexander D. MacKay	5,984	15.59%	
Liberal-Conservative	John Bell	4,416	11.51%	
Labour	Bertha A. Donaldson	2,930	7.63%	
Total		38,381	–	
Source(s) Source: Nova Scotia Legislature (2024). "Electoral History for Pictou County" (PDF). nslegislature.ca.

1916 Nova Scotia general election
Party	Candidate	Votes	%	Elected
Liberal	Robert M. McGregor	4,555	17.68%	✓
Liberal	Robert Henry Graham	4,512	17.52%	✓
Liberal	Robert Hugh MacKay	4,309	16.73%	✓
Liberal-Conservative	John W. McKay	4,210	16.34%	
Liberal-Conservative	Charles Elliott Tanner	4,165	16.17%	
Liberal-Conservative	J. William Sutherland	3,557	13.81%	
Labour	John B. Strickland	450	1.75%	
Total		25,758	–	
Source(s) Source: Nova Scotia Legislature (2024). "Electoral History for Pictou County" (PDF). nslegislature.ca.

1911 Nova Scotia general election
Party	Candidate	Votes	%	Elected
Liberal	Robert M. McGregor	3,929	17.39%	✓
Liberal-Conservative	Charles Elliott Tanner	3,788	16.76%	✓
Liberal	Robert Hugh MacKay	3,725	16.49%	✓
Liberal-Conservative	John M. Baillie	3,591	15.89%	
Liberal-Conservative	S. G. Robertson	3,428	15.17%	
Liberal	Archibald MacKenzie	3,299	14.60%	
Labour	P. P. Cosgrove	835	3.70%	
Total		22,595	–	
Source(s) Source: Nova Scotia Legislature (2024). "Electoral History for Pictou County" (PDF). nslegislature.ca.

Nova Scotia provincial by-election, 1909-02-16
Party	Candidate	Votes	%	Elected
Liberal	Robert Hugh MacKay	3,828	51.03%	✓
Liberal-Conservative	Charles Elliott Tanner	3,673	48.97%	
Total		7,501	–	
Source(s) Source: Nova Scotia Legislature (2024). "Electoral History for Pictou County" (PDF). nslegislature.ca.

1906 Nova Scotia general election
Party	Candidate	Votes	%	Elected
Liberal-Conservative	Charles Elliott Tanner	3,983	18.19%	✓
Liberal	Robert M. McGregor	3,832	17.50%	✓
Liberal-Conservative	John M. Baillie	3,617	16.52%	✓
Liberal	Robert Hugh MacKay	3,546	16.19%	
Liberal	George Geddie Patterson	3,546	16.19%	
Liberal-Conservative	George E. Munro	3,372	15.40%	
Total		21,896	–	
Source(s) Source: Nova Scotia Legislature (2024). "Electoral History for Pictou County" (PDF). nslegislature.ca.

Nova Scotia provincial by-election, 1904-12-15
Party	Candidate	Votes	%	Elected
Liberal	Robert M. McGregor	3,517	51.61%	✓
Liberal-Conservative	Adam Carr Bell	3,298	48.39%	
Total		6,815	–	
Source(s) Source: Nova Scotia Legislature (2024). "Electoral History for Pictou County" (PDF). nslegislature.ca.

1901 Nova Scotia general election
Party	Candidate	Votes	%	Elected
Liberal	Edward Mortimer Macdonald	3,703	20.61%	✓
Liberal	George Geddie Patterson	3,534	19.67%	✓
Liberal-Conservative	Charles Elliott Tanner	3,186	17.73%	✓
Liberal	Robert Dewar	3,157	17.57%	
Liberal-Conservative	George E. Munro	3,011	16.76%	
Liberal-Conservative	William Cameron	1,377	7.66%	
Total		17,968	–	
Source(s) Source: Nova Scotia Legislature (2024). "Electoral History for Pictou County" (PDF). nslegislature.ca.

Nova Scotia provincial by-election, 1900-12-12
Party	Candidate	Votes	%	Elected
Liberal	Edward Mortimer Macdonald	acclaimed	N/A	✓
Liberal-Conservative	Charles Elliott Tanner	acclaimed	N/A	✓
Total			–	
Source(s) Source: Nova Scotia Legislature (2024). "Electoral History for Pictou County" (PDF). nslegislature.ca.

1897 Nova Scotia general election
Party	Candidate	Votes	%	Elected
Liberal	James Drummond McGregor	3,456	17.24%	✓
Liberal	Edward Mortimer Macdonald	3,422	17.07%	✓
Liberal-Conservative	Matthew Henry Fitzpatrick	3,314	16.54%	✓
Liberal	John McIntosh	3,299	16.46%	
Liberal-Conservative	Charles Elliott Tanner	3,289	16.41%	
Liberal-Conservative	William Cameron	3,262	16.28%	
Total		20,042	–	
Source(s) Source: Nova Scotia Legislature (2024). "Electoral History for Pictou County" (PDF). nslegislature.ca.

1894 Nova Scotia general election
Party	Candidate	Votes	%	Elected
Liberal-Conservative	William Cameron	3,254	17.93%	✓
Liberal-Conservative	Charles Elliott Tanner	3,236	17.83%	✓
Liberal-Conservative	Alexander Grant	3,109	17.13%	✓
Liberal	James Drummond McGregor	2,992	16.49%	
Liberal	Edward Mortimer Macdonald	2,797	15.41%	
Liberal	J. F. Oliver	2,759	15.20%	
Total		18,147	–	
Source(s) Source: Nova Scotia Legislature (2024). "Electoral History for Pictou County" (PDF). nslegislature.ca.

1890 Nova Scotia general election
Party	Candidate	Votes	%	Elected
Liberal-Conservative	William Cameron	2,897	17.05%	✓
Liberal	James Drummond McGregor	2,885	16.98%	✓
Liberal-Conservative	Alexander Grant	2,883	16.97%	✓
Liberal-Conservative	Charles Elliott Tanner	2,835	16.68%	
Independent	Robert Drummond	2,764	16.27%	
Liberal	John Yorston	2,728	16.05%	
Total		16,992	–	
Source(s) Source: Nova Scotia Legislature (2024). "Electoral History for Pictou County" (PDF). nslegislature.ca.

Nova Scotia provincial by-election, 1887-03-08
Party	Candidate	Votes	%	Elected
Liberal-Conservative	William Cameron	acclaimed	N/A	✓
Total			–	
Source(s) Source: Nova Scotia Legislature (2024). "Electoral History for Pictou County" (PDF). nslegislature.ca.

1886 Nova Scotia general election
Party	Candidate	Votes	%	Elected
Liberal-Conservative	Adam Carr Bell	2,844	18.22%	✓
Liberal	Jeffrey McColl	2,606	16.70%	✓
Liberal-Conservative	Charles H. Munro	2,578	16.52%	✓
Liberal-Conservative	Robert Hockin	2,565	16.44%	
Liberal	John D. McLeod	2,514	16.11%	
Liberal	Robert Drummond	2,498	16.01%	
Total		15,605	–	
Source(s) Source: Nova Scotia Legislature (2024). "Electoral History for Pictou County" (PDF). nslegislature.ca.

1882 Nova Scotia general election
Party	Candidate	Votes	%	Elected
Liberal-Conservative	Robert Hockin	2,492	17.41%	✓
Liberal-Conservative	Charles H. Munro	2,489	17.39%	✓
Liberal-Conservative	Adam Carr Bell	2,473	17.28%	✓
Liberal	Jeffrey McColl	2,411	16.84%	
Liberal	Edward Mortimer Macdonald	2,250	15.72%	
Liberal	Cornelius Dwyer	2,200	15.37%	
Total		14,315	–	
Source(s) Source: Nova Scotia Legislature (2024). "Electoral History for Pictou County" (PDF). nslegislature.ca.

1878 Nova Scotia general election
Party	Candidate	Votes	%	Elected
Liberal-Conservative	Simon Hugh Holmes	2,752	18.57%	✓
Liberal-Conservative	Adam Carr Bell	2,694	18.18%	✓
Liberal-Conservative	Alexander MacKay	2,592	17.49%	✓
Liberal	George Murray	2,349	15.85%	
Liberal	J. D. McLeod	2,250	15.18%	
Liberal	Robert McNeil	2,183	14.73%	
Total		14,820	–	
Source(s) Source: Nova Scotia Legislature (2024). "Electoral History for Pictou County" (PDF). nslegislature.ca.

1874 Nova Scotia general election
Party	Candidate	Votes	%	Elected
Liberal-Conservative	Hugh J. Cameron		N/A	✓
Liberal-Conservative	Simon Hugh Holmes		N/A	✓
Liberal-Conservative	Alexander MacKay		N/A	✓
Total			–	
Source(s) Source: Nova Scotia Legislature (2024). "Electoral History for Pictou County" (PDF). nslegislature.ca.

Nova Scotia provincial by-election, 1872-10-16
Party	Candidate	Votes	%	Elected
Liberal-Conservative	Alexander MacKay	2,322	59.22%	✓
Liberal	Marshall	1,599	40.78%	
Total		3,921	–	
Source(s) Source: Nova Scotia Legislature (2024). "Electoral History for Pictou County" (PDF). nslegislature.ca.

1871 Nova Scotia general election
Party	Candidate	Votes	%	Elected
Liberal-Conservative	James McDonald	2,270	18.21%	✓
Liberal-Conservative	Simon Hugh Holmes	2,242	17.98%	✓
Liberal-Conservative	Hugh J. Cameron	2,188	17.55%	✓
Liberal	George Murray	1,955	15.68%	
Liberal	J. D. McLeod	1,927	15.46%	
Liberal	Robert S. Copeland	1,884	15.11%	
Total		12,466	–	
Source(s) Source: Nova Scotia Legislature (2024). "Electoral History for Pictou County" (PDF). nslegislature.ca.

Nova Scotia provincial by-election, 1867-12-05
Party	Candidate	Votes	%	Elected
Anti-Confederation	Martin Isaac Wilkins	acclaimed	N/A	✓
Total			–	
Source(s) Source: Nova Scotia Legislature (2024). "Electoral History for Pictou County" (PDF). nslegislature.ca.

1867 Nova Scotia general election
Party	Candidate	Votes	%	Elected
Anti-Confederation	George Murray	2,019	18.45%	✓
Anti-Confederation	Robert S. Copeland	1,977	18.06%	✓
Anti-Confederation	Martin Isaac Wilkins	1,968	17.98%	✓
Confederation	Simon Hugh Holmes	1,684	15.38%	
Confederation	Donald Fraser	1,649	15.06%	
Confederation	Alexander McKay	1,649	15.06%	
Total		10,946	–	
Source(s) Source: Nova Scotia Legislature (2024). "Electoral History for Pictou County" (PDF). nslegislature.ca.

== See also ==
- List of Nova Scotia provincial electoral districts
- Canadian provincial electoral districts
