= 30th General Assembly of Nova Scotia =

The 30th General Assembly of Nova Scotia represented Nova Scotia between 1890 and 1894.

The Liberal Party led by William Stevens Fielding formed the government.

Michael J. Power was chosen as speaker for the house.

The assembly was dissolved on February 14, 1894.

== List of Members ==
Electoral District	Name	Party	First elected / previously elected
Annapolis County	Henry H. Chute	Liberal	1890
Annapolis County	J. W. Longley	Liberal	1882
Antigonish County	Angus McGillivray (Note: ran for federal seat)	Liberal	1878
Antigonish County	Colin F. McIsaac	Liberal	1886
Antigonish County	Christopher P. Chisholm (1891)	Liberal	1891
County of Cape Breton	Angus J. McDonald	Liberal	1890
County of Cape Breton	Joseph McPherson	Liberal	1890
County of Cape Breton	Joseph McPherson (1891)	Liberal	1891
Colchester County	George Clarke	Liberal	1886
Colchester County	Frederick Andrew Laurence	Liberal	1886
Cumberland County	George W. Forrest	Liberal-Conservative	1890
Cumberland County	William Oxley	Liberal-Conservative	1890
Digby County	Ambrose H. Comeau	Liberal	1890
Digby County	Eliakim E. Tupper	Liberal	1890
Guysborough County	Alexander F. Cameron	Liberal-Conservative	1890
Guysborough County	Hamilton Morrow	Liberal-Conservative	1890
Halifax County	William S. Fielding	Liberal	1882
Halifax County	Michael Joseph Power	Liberal	1882
Halifax County	William Roche, Jr.	Liberal	1886
Hants County	Allen Haley	Liberal	1882
Hants County	Thomas B. Smith	Liberal-Conservative	1874, (Note: First elected as a Liberal) 1878, (Note: Re-elected as a Liberal) 1890
Hants County	Arthur Drysdale (1891)	Liberal	1891
Inverness County	John McKinnon	Liberal	1874, 1886
Inverness County	Daniel McNeil	Liberal	1886
Kings County	Barclay Webster	Liberal-Conservative	1890
Kings County	Alfred P. Welton	Liberal	1890
Lunenburg County	Charles E. Church	Liberal	1882
Lunenburg County	John D. Sperry	Liberal	1889
Pictou County	William Cameron	Liberal-Conservative	1887
Pictou County	Alexander Grant	Liberal-Conservative	1890
Pictou County	James D. McGregor	Liberal	1890
Queens County	Albert M. Hemeon	Liberal	1887
Queens County	Richard Hunt	Liberal	1890
Richmond County	Abraham LeBlanc	Liberal	1890
Richmond County	Joseph Matheson	Liberal	1886
Shelburne County	Thomas Johnston	Liberal	1867, 1882
Shelburne County	Charles H. Cahan	Liberal-Conservative	1890
Victoria County	John L. Bethune	Conservative	1886
Victoria County	John A. Fraser	Liberal	1874, 1886
Yarmouth County	Albert Gayton (Note: named registrar of deeds)	Liberal	1871
Yarmouth County	William Law	Liberal	1886
Yarmouth County	Forman Hatfield (1890)	Liberal	1890

== Notes ==
Preceded by 29th General Assembly of Nova Scotia	General Assemblies of Nova Scotia; 1890–1894	Succeeded by 31st General Assembly of Nova Scotia
