= 1894 Nova Scotia general election =

Canadian provincial election

- March 8–15, 1894

38 seats of the Nova Scotia House of Assembly 20 seats needed for a majority
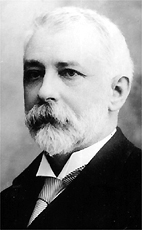
	First party	Second party
		Con
Leader	William Stevens Fielding	William MacKay
Party	Liberal	Liberal-Conservative
Leader since	1884	1894
Leader's seat	Halifax	Ran in Cape Breton (Won)
Last election	28	10
Seats won	26	12
Seat change	▼2	▲2
Popular vote	75,295	68,455
Percentage	52.05%	47.33%
Swing	▲1.21pp	▲0.59pp
Premier before election
William Stevens Fielding
Liberal
Premier after election
William Stevens Fielding
Liberal

The 1894 Nova Scotia general election was held from 8 March to 15 March 1894 to elect members of the 31st House of Assembly of the province of Nova Scotia, Canada. It was won by the Liberal party.

== Results ==
=== Results by party ===
↓
26	12
Liberal	Liberal-Conservative

Official results
Party	Party leader	# of candidates	Seats				Popular vote		
Party	Party leader	# of candidates	1890	Dissolution	Elected	Change	#	%	Change (pp)
Liberal	William Stevens Fielding	39	28	27	26	-2	75,295	52.05%	+1.21%
Liberal-Conservative	William MacKay	37	10	10	12	+2	68,455	47.33%	+0.59%
Independent/Other		1	0	0	0	0	899	0.62%	-1.80%
Vacant				1					
Total valid votes							144,649	100.00%	–
Blank and invalid ballots							0	0.00%	–
Total		77	38	38	38	–	144,649	100.00%	–

Popular vote
Liberal	52.05%
Liberal-Conservative	47.33%
Independent/Other	0.62%

Seats summary
Liberal	68.42%
Liberal-Conservative	31.58%

== Retiring incumbents ==
Liberal

- George Clarke, Colchester
- Daniel McNeil, Inverness
- Henry M. Munro, Annapolis

Liberal-Conservative

- Alexander F. Cameron, Guysborough
- Thomas Barlow Smith, Hants

== Nominated candidates ==
1894 Nova Scotia Provincial Election

Legend
bold denotes party leader
† denotes an incumbent who is not running for re-election or was defeated in nomination contest

=== Valley ===
Electoral district	Candidates			Incumbent
Electoral district	Liberal	Liberal-Conservative	Independent/Other	Incumbent
Annapolis	James Wilberforce Longley; 1,808; 27.18%	Thomas R. Jones; 1,555; 23.38%		James Wilberforce Longley
Annapolis	Joseph A. Bancroft; 1,793; 26.95%	Hugh E. Gillis; 1,496; 22.49%		Henry M. Munro†
Digby	Ambroise-Hilaire Comeau; 1,228; 27.54%	Louis Dugan; 1,018; 22.83%		Ambroise-Hilaire Comeau
Digby	Eliakim Tupper; 1,245; 27.92%	M. R. Timpany; 968; 21.71%		Eliakim Tupper
Hants	Arthur Drysdale; 1,706; 25.19%	James A. Thompson; 1,689; 24.94%		Arthur Drysdale
Hants	W. H. Guild; 1,644; 24.28%	Charles Smith Wilcox; 1,733; 25.59%		Thomas Barlow Smith†
Kings	Brenton Dodge; 2,227; 31.%	Barclay Webster; 1,580; 21.99%		Barclay Webster
Kings	Harry H. Wickwire; 2,081; 28.97%	R. M. Rand; 1,296; 18.04%		Vacant

=== South Shore ===
Electoral district	Candidates			Incumbent
Electoral district	Liberal	Liberal-Conservative	Independent/Other	Incumbent
Lunenburg	John Drew Sperry; 2,648; 27.92%	James A. McLean; 2,133; 22.49%		John Drew Sperry
Lunenburg	Charles Edward Church; 2,602; 27.44%	J. A. Hirtle; 2,101; 22.15%		Charles Edward Church
Queens	Albert M. Hemeon; 913; 28.83%	John Hutt; 703; 22.20%		Albert M. Hemeon
Queens	Richard Hunt; 912; 28.79%	O.L. Patch; 639; 20.18%		Richard Hunt
Shelburne	Thomas Johnston; 1,282; 26.31%	R. W. Freeman; 1,059; 21.74%		Thomas Johnston
Shelburne	Thomas Robertson; 1,319; 27.07%	Charles Cahan; 1,212; 24.88%		Charles Cahan
Yarmouth	William Law; 1,464; 31.78%		E.C. Simonson (Prohibitionist-Temperance); 899; 19.51%	William Law
Yarmouth	Cornelius Forman Hatfield; 1,097; 23.81%	Albert A. Pothier; 1,147; 24.90%		Cornelius Forman Hatfield

=== Fundy-Northeast ===
Electoral district	Candidates			Incumbent
Electoral district	Liberal	Liberal-Conservative	Independent/Other	Incumbent
Colchester	Frederick Andrew Laurence; 1,896; 25.09%	Israel Longworth; 1,890; 25.02%		Frederick Andrew Laurence
Colchester	Alfred Dickie; 1,814; 24.01%	Wilbert David Dimock; 1,955; 25.88%		George Clarke†
Cumberland	Thomas Reuben Black; 3,109; 28.47%	George W. Forrest; 2,498; 22.87%		George W. Forrest
Cumberland	Alexander E. Fraser; 2,902; 26.58%	William Oxley; 2,411; 22.08%		William Oxley

=== Halifax ===
Electoral district	Candidates			Incumbent
Electoral district	Liberal	Liberal-Conservative	Independent/Other	Incumbent
Halifax	**William Stevens Fielding**; 4,795; 17.88%	T. W. Walsh; 4,019; 14.99%		William Stevens Fielding
Halifax	William Roche; 4,651; 17.35%	James Morrow; 4,406; 16.43%		William Roche
Halifax	Michael Joseph Power; 4,373; 16.31%	William Anderson Black; 4,570; 17.04%		Michael Joseph Power

=== Central Nova ===
Electoral district	Candidates			Incumbent
Electoral district	Liberal	Liberal-Conservative	Independent/Other	Incumbent
Antigonish	Colin Francis McIsaac; 1,333; 27.99%	J.J. Cameron; 1,141; 23.95%		Colin Francis McIsaac
Antigonish	Christopher P. Chisholm; 1,225; 25.72%	C. Ernest Gregory; 1,064; 22.34%		Christopher P. Chisholm
Guysborough	Daniel H. McKinnon; 1,240; 28.70%	Hamilton Morrow; 979; 22.66%		Hamilton Morrow
Guysborough	John Howard Sinclair; 1,216; 28.15%	A. Whitman; 885; 20.49%		Alexander F. Cameron†
Pictou	Edward Mortimer Macdonald; 2,797; 15.41%	William Cameron; 3,254; 17.93%		William Cameron
Pictou	James Drummond McGregor; 2,992; 16.49%	Charles Elliott Tanner; 3,236; 17.83%		James Drummond McGregor
Pictou	J. F. Oliver; 2,759; 15.20%	Alexander Grant; 3,109; 17.13%		Alexander Grant

=== Cape Breton ===
Electoral district	Candidates			Incumbent
Electoral district	Liberal	Liberal-Conservative	Independent/Other	Incumbent
Cape Breton	Joseph McPherson; 2,592; 23.89%	**William MacKay**; 2,885; 26.59%		Joseph McPherson
Cape Breton	Angus J. MacDonald; 2,552; 23.52%	John McCormick; 2,822; 26.01%		Angus J. MacDonald
Inverness	John McKinnon; 1,746; 24.87%	John H. Jameison; 1,857; 26.45%		John McKinnon
Inverness	Samuel McDonnell; 1,658; 23.61%	Alexander Campbell; 1,760; 25.07%		Daniel McNeil†
Richmond	Simon Joyce; 996; 25.89%	Abraham LeBlanc; 883; 22.95%		Abraham LeBlanc
Richmond	Joseph Matheson; 974; 25.32%	John Morrison; 994; 25.84%		Joseph Matheson
Victoria	John Gillis Morrison; 784; 24.39%	John J. McCabe; 597; 18.57%		John A. Fraser
Victoria	John A. Fraser; 748; 23.27%	John Lemuel Bethune; 911; 28.34%		John Lemuel Bethune
Victoria	M. H. MacKenzie; 174; 5.41%	John Lemuel Bethune; 911; 28.34%		John Lemuel Bethune
