= Hugh J. Cameron =

Canadian politician from Nova Scotia (?-1908)

Member of the Nova Scotia House of Assembly for Pictou County
- In office May 16, 1871 – September 16, 1878 Serving with James McDonald, Alexander MacKay, Simon Hugh Holmes, Adam C. Bell
- Preceded by: George Murray; Robert S. Copeland; Martin I. Wilkins
- Succeeded by: Robert Hockin; Charles H. Munro; Adam C. Bell

Personal details
- Died: 1908 New Glasgow, Nova Scotia
- Party: Liberal Conservative
- Spouse: Margaret MacGillivray ()
- Occupation: merchant
- Profession: Politician

Hugh J. Cameron (unknown – 1908) was a merchant and political figure in Nova Scotia, Canada. He represented Pictou County in the Nova Scotia House of Assembly from 1871 to 1878 as a Liberal Conservative member. He died in 1908 in New Glasgow, Nova Scotia. He was elected in the 1871 and acclaimed in the 1874 Nova Scotia general election.
