= Simon Hugh Holmes =

Premier of Nova Scotia from 1878 to 1882

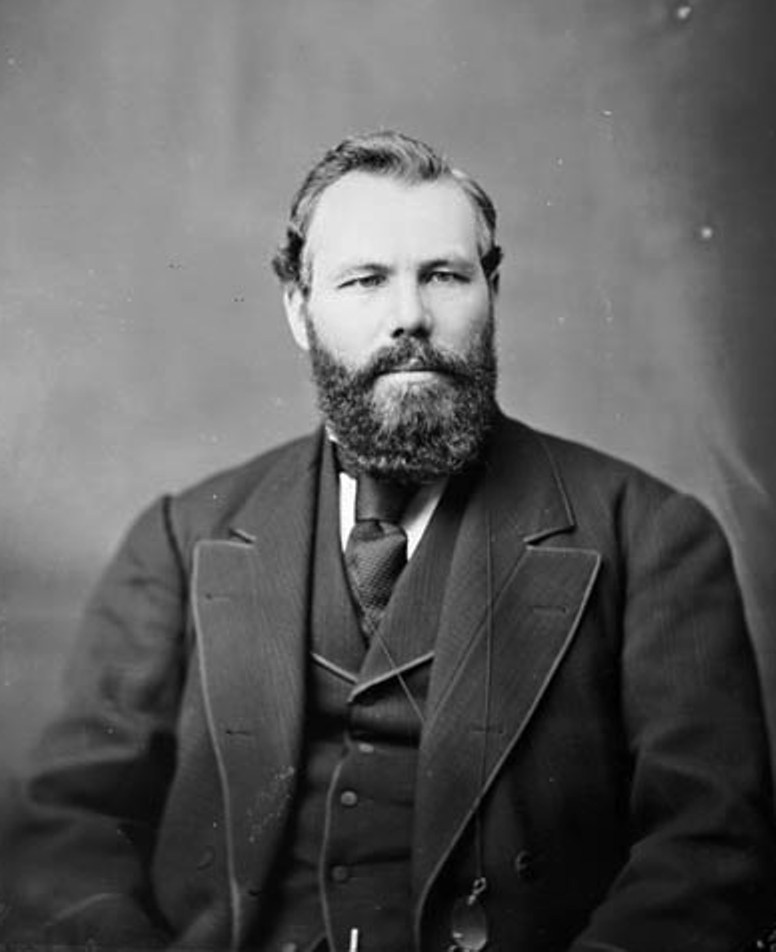

4th Premier of Nova Scotia
- In office October 22, 1878 – May 23, 1882
- Monarch: Victoria
- Lieutenant Governor: Adams George Archibald
- Preceded by: Philip Carteret Hill
- Succeeded by: John Sparrow David Thompson

MLA for Pictou County
- In office May 16, 1871 – May 23, 1882 Serving with James McDonald, Alexander MacKay, Hugh J. Cameron, Adam C. Bell
- Preceded by: George Murray; Robert S. Copeland; Martin I. Wilkins
- Succeeded by: Robert Hockin; Charles H. Munro; Adam C. Bell

Personal details
- Born: July 30, 1831 Springville, Nova Scotia
- Died: October 14, 1919 (aged 88) Halifax, Nova Scotia
- Party: Conservative
- Spouse: Isabella Jane Little (m. 1874)
- Relations: John Holmes, father
- Children: 4 daughters
- Education: Pictou Academy
- Occupation: Lawyer, journalist
- Profession: Politician

Simon Hugh Holmes (July 30, 1831 – October 14, 1919) was a Nova Scotia politician, publisher and lawyer. He was the fourth premier of Nova Scotia from 1878 to 1882.

Holmes was born in Springville, Nova Scotia, in Pictou County. The son of Nova Scotia politician and Canadian senator John Holmes, Holmes in 1858 founded and edited the Pictou Colonial Standard as “a dedicated advocate of the principles of true Conservatism.” The paper and Holmes were advocates of Canadian Confederation. Holmes remained editor until 1878 when he became Premier.

Holmes attempted to win a seat in the Nova Scotia House of Assembly in 1867 but was defeated in a wave of anti-Confederation sentiment. He won a seat in 1871 and soon became de facto leader of the Conservative opposition. The Tories won the 1878 election and Holmes became Premier of the province to find the treasury depleted and the Legislative Council in the hands of the Liberals.

The Tory government passed legislation to create county government, lengthened the training period for teachers, subsidized education for blind children and attempted to improve mine safety. The Liberal-dominated Upper House frustrated much of Holmes' program and he attempted three times to abolish the Legislative Council, but failed.

Holmes' personal style tended to be authoritarian and this factor, along with the political impasse, led to a caucus revolt that resulted in his resignation in 1882 to accept a lucrative position as crown clerk for Halifax County. He died in Halifax.

== Bibliography ==
- "Simon Hugh Holmes". Dictionary of Canadian Biography (online ed.). University of Toronto Press. 1979–2016.
