= Donald F. Fraser =

Canadian politician

MLA for Pictou County
- In office 1933–1937
- Preceded by: John Doull; Robert Albert Douglas; Hugh Allan MacQuarrie
- Succeeded by: Newton G. Munro

Personal details
- Born: August 16, 1872 Goldenville, Nova Scotia
- Died: March 13, 1946 (aged 73) New Glasgow, Nova Scotia
- Party: Nova Scotia Liberal Party
- Occupation: editor, publisher

Donald Fisher Fraser (August 16, 1872 – March 13, 1946) was a Canadian politician. He represented the electoral district of Pictou County in the Nova Scotia House of Assembly from 1933 to 1937. He was a member of the Nova Scotia Liberal Party.

Fraser was born in 1872 at Goldenville, Nova Scotia. He married Evelyn Woodman in 1926, and was the editor and publisher of the Eastern Chronicle newspaper. Fraser first attempted to enter provincial politics in the 1928 election, but was defeated. He ran again in 1933, and was elected in the dual-member Pictou County riding with Liberal Josiah H. MacQuarrie. Fraser resigned his seat on April 23, 1937. Following his resignation, he was elected a municipal councillor, and served as the registrar of deeds for Pictou County. Fraser died at New Glasgow on March 13, 1946.
