= 1911 Nova Scotia general election =

Canadian provincial election

- June 14, 1911

38 seats of the Nova Scotia House of Assembly 20 seats needed for a majority
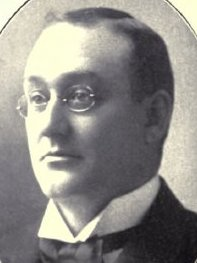
	First party	Second party
		Con
Leader	George Henry Murray	John M. Baillie
Party	Liberal	Liberal-Conservative
Leader since	1896	1909
Leader's seat	Victoria	Pictou (Lost re-election)
Last election	32	5
Seats won	27	11
Seat change	▼5	▲6
Popular vote	99,192	88,114
Percentage	51.09%	45.38%
Swing	▼3.99pp	▲3.06pp
Premier before election
George Henry Murray
Liberal
Premier after election
George Henry Murray
Liberal

The 1911 Nova Scotia general election was held on 14 June 1911 to elect members of the 35th House of Assembly of the province of Nova Scotia, Canada. It was won by the Liberal party.

== Results ==
=== Results by party ===
↓
27	11
Liberal	Liberal-Conservative

Official results
Party	Party leader	# of candidates	Seats				Popular vote		
Party	Party leader	# of candidates	1906	Dissolution	Elected	Change	#	%	Change (pp)
Liberal	George Henry Murray	38	32	32	27	-5	99,192	51.09%	-3.99%
Liberal-Conservative	John M. Baillie	37	5	5	11	+6	88,114	45.38%	+3.06%
Independent/Other		3	1	1	0	-1	3,441	1.77%	-0.83%
Labour	None	2	0	0	0	0	3,410	1.76%	+1.76%
Vacant				0					
Total valid votes							194,157	100.00%	–
Blank and invalid ballots							0	0.00%	–
Total		78	38	38	38	–	194,157	100.00%	–

Popular vote
Liberal	51.09%
Liberal-Conservative	45.38%
Independent/Other	1.77%
Labour	1.76%

Seats summary
Liberal	71.05%
Liberal-Conservative	28.95%

== Retiring incumbents ==
Liberal

- Joseph A. Bancroft, Annapolis
- Charles F. Cooper, Queens
- Neil J. Gillis, Cape Breton
- Joshua H. Livingstone, Cumberland
- David McPherson, Halifax
- Moses H. Nickerson, Shelburne
- James O'Brien, Hants
- Elisha B. Paul, Cumberland
- William Whitman, Guysborough

== Nominated candidates ==
1911 Nova Scotia Provincial Election

Legend
bold denotes party leader
† denotes an incumbent who is not running for re-election or was defeated in nomination contest

=== Valley ===
Electoral district	Candidates				Incumbent
Electoral district	Liberal	Liberal-Conservative	Labour	Independent/Other	Incumbent
Annapolis	Orlando Daniels; 2,092; 26.74%	A. L. Davison; 1,931; 24.68%			Orlando Daniels
Annapolis	J. R. Hall; 1,863; 23.81%	Norman Phinney; 1,938; 24.77%			Joseph A. Bancroft†
Digby	Joseph William Comeau; 1,892; 28.09%	Harry Hatheway Marshall; 1,599; 23.74%			Joseph William Comeau
Digby	Allen Ellsworth Wall; 1,855; 27.54%	F. P. Deveau; 1,389; 20.62%			Allen Ellsworth Wall
Hants	James William Reid; 2,066; 25.24%	P. M. Feilding; 2,006; 24.51%			James O'Brien†
Hants	George Wilson; 1,809; 22.10%	Albert Parsons; 2,303; 28.14%			Albert Parsons
Kings	Harry H. Wickwire; 2,413; 27.12%	S. C. Parker; 1,599; 17.97%		N. W. Eaton; 1,893; 21.28% (Moral Reform)	Harry H. Wickwire
Kings	Archibald Menzies Covert; 2,156; 24.24%			Charles Alexander Campbell; 835; 9.39% (Moral Reform)	Charles Alexander Campbell

=== South Shore ===
Electoral district	Candidates				Incumbent
Electoral district	Liberal	Liberal-Conservative	Labour	Independent/Other	Incumbent
Lunenburg	Alexander Kenneth Maclean; 3,136; 27.98%	Alfred Clairmonte Zwicker; 2,405; 21.46%			Alexander Kenneth Maclean
Lunenburg	Charles Uniacke Mader; 2,679; 23.90%	Joseph Willis Margeson; 2,987; 26.65%			Charles Uniacke Mader
Queens	Jordan W. Smith; 1,047; 26.42%	Philson Kempton; 953; 24.05%			Charles F. Cooper†
Queens	W. P. Purney; 884; 22.31%	William Lorimer Hall; 1,079; 27.23%			William Lorimer Hall
Shelburne	Robert Irwin; 1,245; 26.64%	R. Ward Fisher; 1,120; 23.97%			Robert Irwin
Shelburne	Smith Nickerson; 1,202; 25.72%	George Phillips; 1,106; 23.67%			Moses H. Nickerson†
Yarmouth	Ernest Howard Armstrong; 1,665; 28.02%	James G. d'Entremont; 1,180; 19.86%			Ernest Howard Armstrong
Yarmouth	Henry S. LeBlanc; 1,514; 25.48%	Howard Corning; 1,583; 26.64%			Henry S. LeBlanc

=== Fundy-Northeast ===
Electoral district	Candidates				Incumbent
Electoral district	Liberal	Liberal-Conservative	Labour	Independent/Other	Incumbent
Colchester	William Davison Hill; 2,449; 25.07%	Frank Stanfield; 2,592; 26.53%			William Davison Hill
Colchester	Benjamin Franklin Pearson; 2,206; 22.58%	Robert H. Kennedy; 2,522; 25.82%			Benjamin Franklin Pearson
Cumberland	James Ralston; 4,168; 26.10%	J. Flemming Gilroy; 4,030; 25.24%			Elisha B. Paul†
Cumberland	Rufus Carter; 4,154; 26.01%	C. R. Smith; 3,617; 22.65%			Joshua H. Livingstone†

=== Halifax ===
Electoral district	Candidates				Incumbent
Electoral district	Liberal	Liberal-Conservative	Labour	Independent/Other	Incumbent
Halifax	F. J. Logan; 6,142; 17.74%	Frederick P. Bligh; 5,187; 14.98%	John T. Joy; 2,575; 7.44%		David McPherson†
Halifax	George Everett Faulkner; 6,120; 17.68%	Nelson R. Smith; 4,825; 13.94%			George Everett Faulkner
Halifax	Robert Emmett Finn; 5,836; 16.86%	J. C. O'Mullin; 3,937; 11.37%			Robert Emmett Finn

=== Central Nova ===
Electoral district	Candidates				Incumbent
Electoral district	Liberal	Liberal-Conservative	Labour	Independent/Other	Incumbent
Antigonish	Fred Robert Trotter; 1,267; 27.24%	Hugh MacDougall; 1,016; 21.84%			Fred Robert Trotter
Antigonish	Christopher P. Chisholm; 1,070; 23.00%	Edward Lavin Girroir; 1,299; 27.92%			Christopher P. Chisholm
Guysborough	James Cranswick Tory; 1,860; 26.97%	G. T. MacNeil; 1,625; 23.56%			William Whitman†
Guysborough	James F. Ellis; 1,794; 26.01%	J. S. Wells; 1,618; 23.46%			James F. Ellis
Pictou	Robert M. McGregor; 3,929; 17.39%	Charles Elliott Tanner; 3,788; 16.76%	P. P. Foxgrove; 835; 3.70%		Robert M. McGregor
Pictou	Robert Hugh MacKay; 3,725; 16.49%	S. G. Robertson; 3,428; 15.17%			Robert Hugh MacKay
Pictou	Archibald MacKenzie; 3,299; 14.60%	**John M. Baillie**; 3,591; 15.89%			John M. Baillie

=== Cape Breton ===
Electoral district	Candidates				Incumbent
Electoral district	Liberal	Liberal-Conservative	Labour	Independent/Other	Incumbent
Cape Breton	Arthur Samuel Kendall; 5,987; 23.99%	John Carey Douglas; 6,252; 25.05%			Arthur Samuel Kendall
Cape Breton	W. F. Carroll; 5,756; 23.07%	Robert Hamilton Butts; 6,246; 25.03%		Alex McKinnon; 713; 2.86% (Socialist)	Neil J. Gillis†
Inverness	Donald MacLennan; 2,723; 27.92%	C.E MacMillan; 2,143; 21.97%			C.E. MacMillan
Inverness	James MacDonald; 2,613; 26.79%	Thomas Gallant; 2,274; 23.32%			James MacDonald
Richmond	Simon Joyce; 1,108; 28.94%	Felix Landry; 821; 21.45%			Felix Landry
Richmond	Charles P. Bissett; 1,097; 28.66%	James McVicar; 802; 20.95%			Charles P. Bissett
Victoria	**George Henry Murray**; 1,247; 33.76%	John Lemuel Bethune; 696; 18.84%			George Henry Murray
Victoria	Angus A. Buchanan; 1,124; 30.43%	Duncan McDonald; 627; 16.97%			Angus A. Buchanan
