= 1897 Nova Scotia general election =

Canadian provincial election

- April 13–20, 1897

38 seats of the Nova Scotia House of Assembly 20 seats needed for a majority
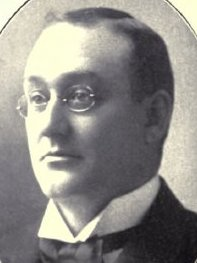
	First party	Second party
		Con
Leader	George Henry Murray	William MacKay
Party	Liberal	Liberal-Conservative
Leader since	1896	1894
Leader's seat	Victoria	Cape Breton (Lost re-election)
Last election	26	12
Seats won	35	3
Seat change	▲9	▼9
Popular vote	84,888	67,254
Percentage	55.57%	44.03%
Swing	▲3.52pp	▼3.30pp
Premier before election
George Henry Murray
Liberal
Premier after election
George Henry Murray
Liberal

The 1897 Nova Scotia general election was held from 13 April to 20 April 1897 to elect members of the 32nd House of Assembly of the province of Nova Scotia, Canada. It was won by the Liberal party.

== Results ==
=== Results by party ===
↓
35	3
Liberal	Liberal-Conservative

Official results
Party	Party leader	# of candidates	Seats				Popular vote		
Party	Party leader	# of candidates	1894	Dissolution	Elected	Change	#	%	Change (pp)
Liberal	George Henry Murray	40	26	28	35	+9	84,888	55.57%	+3.52%
Liberal-Conservative	William MacKay	36	12	10	3	-9	67,254	44.03%	-3.30%
Independent/Other		1	0	0	0	0	605	0.40%	-0.22%
Vacant				0					
Total valid votes							152,747	100.00%	–
Blank and invalid ballots							0	0.00%	–
Total		77	38	38	38	–	152,747	100.00%	–

Popular vote
Liberal	55.57%
Liberal-Conservative	44.03%
Independent/Other	0.40%

Seats summary
Liberal	92.11%
Liberal-Conservative	7.89%

== Retiring incumbents ==
Liberal

- Richard Hunt, Queens
- Daniel H. MacKinnon, Guysborough
- Joseph Matheson, Richmond
- Firman McClure, Colchester
- Allan Moreash, Lunenburg
- William Roche, Halifax

Liberal-Conservative

- William Anderson Black, Halifax
- Alexander Grant, Pictou

== Nominated candidates ==
1897 Nova Scotia Provincial Election

Legend
bold denotes party leader
† denotes an incumbent who is not running for re-election or was defeated in nomination contest

=== Valley ===
Electoral district	Candidates			Incumbent
Electoral district	Liberal	Liberal-Conservative	Independent/Other	Incumbent
Annapolis	James Wilberforce Longley; 1,871; 26.38%	Thomas R. Jones; 1,680; 23.69%		James Wilberforce Longley
Annapolis	Joseph A. Bancroft; 1,878; 26.48%	C. S. Harrington; 1,664; 23.46%		Joseph A. Bancroft
Digby	Angus Morrison Gidney; 1,498; 31.14%	Frank E. Comeau; 940; 19.54%		Angus Morrison Gidney
Digby	Ambroise-Hilaire Comeau; 1,512; 31.43%	M.R. Timpany; 860; 17.88%		Ambroise-Hilaire Comeau
Hants	William McDonald Douglas; 1,707; 24.35%	Charles Smith Wilcox; 1,746; 24.91%		Charles Smith Wilcox
Hants	Arthur Drysdale; 1,839; 26.24%	James A. Thompson; 1,717; 24.50%		Arthur Drysdale
Kings	Brenton Dodge; 2,354; 33.08%	Peter Innis; 1,460; 20.52%		Brenton Dodge
Kings	Harry H. Wickwire; 2,195; 30.85%	Leander Rand; 1,107; 15.56%		Harry H. Wickwire

=== South Shore ===
Electoral district	Candidates			Incumbent
Electoral district	Liberal	Liberal-Conservative	Independent/Other	Incumbent
Lunenburg	John Drew Sperry; 2,581; 25.52%	A.J. Wolff; 2,512; 24.84%		Allan Moreash†
Lunenburg	Charles Edward Church; 2,514; 24.86%	Emanuel Hebb; 2,507; 24.78%		Charles Edward Church
Queens	Edward Matthew Farrell; 876; 26.38%	John Hutt; 666; 20.05%		Edward Matthew Farrell
Queens	R. R. McLeod; 184; 5.54%	John Hutt; 666; 20.05%		Edward Matthew Farrell
Queens	Thomas Keillor; 712; 21.44%	T. H. Siddell; 179; 5.39%		Richard Hunt†
Queens	John Millard; 704; 21.20%	T. H. Siddell; 179; 5.39%		Richard Hunt†
Shelburne	Thomas Johnston; Acclaimed			Thomas Robertson
Shelburne	Thomas Robertson; Acclaimed			Thomas Johnston
Yarmouth	William Law; 1,501; 29.14%	Joseph R. Wyman; 958; 18.60%	E. C. Simonson (Prohibitionist-Temperance); 605; 11.74%	William Law
Yarmouth	Henry S. LeBlanc; 1,473; 28.60%	Albert A. Pothier; 614; 11.92%		Albert A. Pothier

=== Fundy-Northeast ===
Electoral district	Candidates			Incumbent
Electoral district	Liberal	Liberal-Conservative	Independent/Other	Incumbent
Colchester	Alfred Dickie; 2,240; 24.22%	Thomas McMullen; 2,363; 25.55%		Firman McClure†
Colchester	Frederick Andrew Laurence; 2,358; 25.50%	Wilbert David Dimock; 2,286; 24.72%		Frederick Andrew Laurence
Cumberland	Thomas Reuben Black; 3,487; 29.14%	A.A. McKinnon; 2,689; 22.47%		Thomas Reuben Black
Cumberland	Alexander E. Fraser; 3,251; 27.16%	J. C. McDougall; 2,541; 21.23%		Alexander E. Fraser

=== Halifax ===
Electoral district	Candidates			Incumbent
Electoral district	Liberal	Liberal-Conservative	Independent/Other	Incumbent
Halifax	William Bernard Wallace; 5,101; 17.36%	Miner T. Foster; 4,754; 16.18%		William Bernard Wallace
Halifax	David McPherson; 5,307; 18.06%	John Fitzwilliam Stairs; 4,563; 15.53%		William Roche†
Halifax	George Mitchell; 5,312; 18.07%	T. W. Walsh; 4,350; 14.80%		William Anderson Black†

=== Central Nova ===
Electoral district	Candidates			Incumbent
Electoral district	Liberal	Liberal-Conservative	Independent/Other	Incumbent
Antigonish	Angus McGillivray; 1,263; 27.77%	Charles B. Whidden; 1,123; 24.69%		Angus McGillivray
Antigonish	Christopher P. Chisholm; 1,176; 25.86%	Hugh MacDonald; 986; 21.68%		Christopher P. Chisholm
Guysborough	William Akins Fergusson; 1,525; 29.90%	C. Ernest Gregory; 1,065; 20.88%		Daniel H. MacKinnon†
Guysborough	John Howard Sinclair; 1,523; 29.86%	Charles S. Elliott; 987; 19.35%		John Howard Sinclair
Pictou	James Drummond McGregor; 3,456; 17.24%	William Cameron; 3,262; 16.28%		William Cameron
Pictou	Edward Mortimer Macdonald; 3,422; 17.07%	Charles Elliott Tanner; 3,289; 16.41%		Charles Elliott Tanner
Pictou	John McIntosh; 3,299; 16.46%	Matthew Henry Fitzpatrick; 3,314; 16.54%		Alexander Grant†

=== Cape Breton ===
Electoral district	Candidates			Incumbent
Electoral district	Liberal	Liberal-Conservative	Independent/Other	Incumbent
Cape Breton	Arthur Samuel Kendall; 3,705; 29.35%	**William MacKay**; 2,669; 21.14%		William MacKay
Cape Breton	Alexander Johnston; 3,559; 28.19%	John McCormick; 2,691; 21.32%		John McCormick
Inverness	James MacDonald; 2,646; 32.94%	John H. Jameison; 1,537; 19.13%		John H. Jameison
Inverness	Moses J. Doucet; 2,501; 31.13%	Alexander Campbell; 1,350; 16.80%		Alexander Campbell
Richmond	Simon Joyce; 958; 25.86%	John Morrison; 910; 24.57%		Simon Joyce
Richmond	Duncan Finlayson; 1,034; 27.92%	Remi Benoit; 802; 21.65%		Joseph Matheson†
Victoria	**George Henry Murray**; 1,273; 36.59%	John A. McDonald; 651; 18.71%		George Henry Murray
Victoria	John Gillis Morrison; 1,093; 31.42%	A. G. McLeod; 462; 13.28%		John Gillis Morrison
