= 35th General Assembly of Nova Scotia =

The 35th General Assembly of Nova Scotia represented Nova Scotia between 1911 and 1916.

The Liberal Party led by George Henry Murray formed the government.

James F. Ellis was named speaker in 1912.

The assembly was dissolved on May 22, 1916.

== List of Members ==
Electoral District	Name	Party	First elected / previously elected
Annapolis County	O. T. Daniels	Liberal	1906
Annapolis County	Norman H. Phinney	Liberal-Conservative	1911
Antigonish County	E. L. Girroir (Note: named to Senate)	Liberal-Conservative	1911
Antigonish County	Fred Robert Trotter	Liberal	1903
Antigonish County	John Stanfield O'Brien (1913)	Liberal-Conservative	1913
County of Cape Breton	John C. Douglas	Liberal-Conservative	1911
County of Cape Breton	Robert H. Butts	Liberal-Conservative	1911
Colchester County	Frank Stanfield	Liberal-Conservative	1911
Colchester County	Robert H. Kennedy	Liberal-Conservative	1911
Cumberland County	James L. Ralston	Liberal	1911
Cumberland County	Rufus S. Carter	Liberal	1911
Digby County	Joseph Willie Comeau	Liberal	1907
Digby County	Harry Hatheway Marshall	Liberal	1911
Guysborough County	James C. Tory	Liberal	1911
Guysborough County	James F. Ellis	Liberal	1904
Halifax County	F. J. Logan	Liberal	1911
Halifax County	George Everett Faulkner	Liberal	1906
Halifax County	Robert E. Finn	Liberal	1906
Hants County	Albert Parsons	Liberal-Conservative	1909
Hants County	James W. Reid	Liberal	1911
Inverness County	Donald MacLennan	Liberal	1911
Inverness County	James MacDonald	Liberal	1897
Kings County	Harry H. Wickwire	Liberal	1894, 1910
Kings County	A. M. Covert	Liberal	1911
Lunenburg County	Alexander K. MacLean	Liberal	1901, 1909
Lunenburg County	Joseph Willis Margeson	Liberal-Conservative	1911
Pictou County	Robert M. McGregor	Liberal	1904
Pictou County	Charles Elliott Tanner	Liberal-Conservative	1894, 1900
Pictou County	Robert Hugh MacKay	Liberal	1909
Queens County	William Lorimer Hall	Liberal-Conservative	1910
Queens County	Jordan W. Smith	Liberal	1911
Richmond County	Simon Joyce	Liberal	1894, 1911
Richmond County	Charles P. Bissett	Liberal	1904
Shelburne County	Robert Irwin	Liberal	1906
Shelburne County	Smith A. Nickerson	Liberal	1902
Victoria County	George Henry Murray	Liberal	1896
Victoria County	Angus A. Buchanan (Note: died in 1914)	Liberal	1909
Victoria County	Philip McLeod (1914)	Liberal-Conservative	1914
Yarmouth County	Ernest H. Armstrong	Liberal	1906
Yarmouth County	H. W. Corning	Liberal-Conservative	1911

== Notes ==
Preceded by 34th General Assembly of Nova Scotia	General Assemblies of Nova Scotia; 1911–1916	Succeeded by 36th General Assembly of Nova Scotia
