= 34th General Assembly of Nova Scotia =

1906–1911 meeting of Nova Scotia legislature

The 34th General Assembly of Nova Scotia represented Nova Scotia between 1906 and 1911.

The Liberal Party led by George Henry Murray formed the government.

Edward Matthew Farrell was named speaker.

The assembly was dissolved on May 15, 1911.

== List of Members ==
Electoral District	Name	Party	First elected / previously elected
Annapolis County	O. T. Daniels	Liberal	1906
Annapolis County	Joseph A. Bancroft	Liberal	1894
Antigonish County	Christopher P. Chisholm	Liberal	1891
Antigonish County	Fred Robert Trotter	Liberal	1903
County of Cape Breton	Arthur Samuel Kendall	Liberal	1897, 1904
County of Cape Breton	Neil J. Gillis	Liberal	1900
Colchester County	William D. Hill	Liberal	1906
Colchester County	B.F. Pearson	Liberal	1901
Cumberland County	Elisha B. Paul	Liberal	1904
Cumberland County	W. T. Pipes	Liberal	1882, 1906
Cumberland County	Joshua H. Livingston (1909)	Liberal	1909
Digby County	Ambrose H. Comeau	Liberal	1890
Digby County	Angus M. Gidney	Liberal	1895
Digby County	Joseph Willie Comeau (1907)	Liberal	1907
Digby County	Allen Ellsworth Wall (1910)	Liberal	1910
Digby County	Harry Hatheway Marshall (1911)	Liberal	1911
Guysborough County	James F. Ellis	Liberal	1904
Guysborough County	William Whitman	Liberal	1901
Halifax County	David McPherson	Liberal	1897
Halifax County	George Everett Faulkner	Liberal	1906
Halifax County	Robert E. Finn	Liberal	1906
Hants County	Arthur Drysdale	Liberal	1891
Hants County	Charles S. Wilcox	Liberal-Conservative	1894, 1906
Hants County	James O'Brien (1907)	Liberal	1907
Hants County	Albert Parsons (1909)	Liberal-Conservative	1909
Inverness County	James McDonald	Liberal	1897
Inverness County	C. E. MacMillan	Liberal-Conservative	1906
Kings County	Brenton H. Dodge	Liberal	1894
Kings County	C. A. Campbell	Independent	1906
Kings County	Harry H. Wickwire (1910)	Liberal	1894, 1910
Lunenburg County	Charles U. Mader	Liberal	1904
Lunenburg County	Henry A. March	Liberal	1906
Lunenburg County	Alexander K. MacLean (1909)	Liberal	1901, 1909
Lunenburg County	Alfred Clairmonte Zwicker (1911)	Liberal	1911
Pictou County	Robert M. McGregor	Liberal	1904
Pictou County	Charles Elliott Tanner	Liberal-Conservative	1894, 1900
Pictou County	Robert Hugh MacKay (1909)	Liberal	1909
Pictou County	J. M. Baillie	Liberal-Conservative	1906
Queens County	Edward M. Farrell	Liberal	1896
Queens County	Charles F. Cooper	Liberal	1901
Queens County	William Lorimer Hall (1910)	Liberal-Conservative	1910
Richmond County	Charles P. Bissett	Liberal	1904
Richmond County	Felix Landry	Liberal-Conservative	1906
Shelburne County	Moses H. Nickerson	Liberal	1902
Shelburne County	Robert Irwin	Liberal	1906
Victoria County	George Henry Murray	Liberal	1896
Victoria County	John G. Morrison	Liberal	1894
Victoria County	Angus A. Buchanan (1909)	Liberal	1909
Yarmouth County	Ernest H. Armstrong	Liberal	1906
Yarmouth County	Henry S. LeBlanc	Liberal	1897

== Notes ==
Preceded by 33rd General Assembly of Nova Scotia	General Assemblies of Nova Scotia; 1906–1911	Succeeded by 35th General Assembly of Nova Scotia
