= 31st Nova Scotia general election =

The 31st Nova Scotia general election may refer to

- the 1894 Nova Scotia general election, the 30th overall general election for Nova Scotia, for the (due to a counting error in 1859) 31st General Assembly of Nova Scotia,
- the 1897 Nova Scotia general election, the 31st overall general election for Nova Scotia, for the 32nd General Assembly of Nova Scotia, but considered the 9th general election for the Canadian province of Nova Scotia, or
- the 1984 Nova Scotia general election, the 53rd overall general election for Nova Scotia, for the 54th Legislative Assembly of Nova Scotia, but considered the 31st general election for the Canadian province of Nova Scotia.
