= 42nd General Assembly of Nova Scotia =

The 42nd General Assembly of Nova Scotia represented Nova Scotia between February 19, 1942, and September 12, 1945.

== Division of seats ==
There were 30 members of the General Assembly, elected in the 1941 Nova Scotia general election.

Leader	Party	# of Seats
Alexander S. MacMillan	Liberal	22
Frederick Murray Blois	Conservative	4
Donald MacDonald	CCF	3
Total		30

== List of members ==
Riding	Name	Party	First elected / previously elected	Position
Annapolis County	John D. McKenzie	Liberal	1933	Minister of Highways and Public Works
Antigonish	John A. MacIsaac	Liberal	1941	
Antigonish	John Patrick Gorman (1942)	Liberal	1942	
Cape Breton South	Donald MacDonald	CCF	1941	
Cape Breton Centre	Douglas MacDonald	CCF	1939	
Cape Breton North	Alexander O'Handley	Liberal	1925, (Note: Cape Breton East (First elected as a Conservative)) 1941	
Cape Breton East	Douglas Neil Brodie	CCF	1941	
Cape Breton West	Malcolm A. Patterson	Liberal	1937	
Colchester	Fred Murray Blois	Conservative/ Prog. Conservative	1937	
Colchester	George Scott Dickey	Conservative/ Prog. Conservative	1940	
Cumberland	Kenneth Judson Cochrane	Liberal	1941	
Cumberland	Archie B. Smith	Conservative/ Prog. Conservative	1937	
Digby	J. Willie Comeau	Liberal	1907, 1920, 1928	
Guysborough	Havelock Torrey	Liberal	1937	
Halifax South	Joseph Richard Murphy	Liberal	1940	
Halifax Centre	James Edward Rutledge	Liberal	1939	
Halifax North	Harold Connolly	Liberal	1936	Minister of Industry
Halifax East	Geoffrey W. Stevens	Liberal	1933	
Halifax West	Ronald Manning Fielding	Liberal	1941	
Hants	Alexander S. MacMillan	Liberal	1928	Premier
Inverness	Alexander H. McKinnon	Liberal	1940	
Kings	John A. McDonald	Liberal	1920, 1933	Minister of Agriculture
Lunenburg	Frank R. Davis	Liberal	1933	
Lunenburg	Gordon E. Romkey	Liberal	1928	speaker
Pictou	Josiah H. MacQuarrie	Liberal	1933	Attorney General
Pictou	Ernest G. Irish	Conservative/ Prog. Conservative	1941	
Queens	Harry Dennis Madden	Liberal	1941	
Richmond	Donald David Boyd	Liberal	1937	
Richmond	Lauchlin Daniel Currie (1941)	Liberal	1933, (Note: Cape Breton East) 1941	
Shelburne	Wilfred Tennyson Dauphinee	Liberal	1941	
Victoria	John M. Campbell	Liberal	1937	
Yarmouth	Henry A. Waterman	Liberal	1938	

== Former members of the 42nd General Assembly ==
Name	Party	Electoral District	Cause of departure	Succeeded by	Elected
Donald David Boyd	Conservative	Richmond	resigned	Lauchlin Daniel Currie, Liberal	December 15, 1941
John A. MacIsaac	Liberal	Antigonish	died	John Patrick Gorman, Liberal	October 19, 1942

== Notes ==
Preceded by 41st General Assembly of Nova Scotia	General Assemblies of Nova Scotia; 1941–1945	Succeeded by 43rd General Assembly of Nova Scotia
