= 31st General Assembly of Nova Scotia =

The 31st General Assembly of Nova Scotia represented Nova Scotia between 1894 and 1897.

The Liberal Party led by William Stevens Fielding formed the government. George Henry Murray replaced Fielding as party leader and premier when Fielding entered federal politics in 1896.

Frederick A. Lawrence was chosen as speaker for the house.

The assembly was dissolved on March 20, 1897.

== List of Members ==
Electoral District	Name	Party	First elected / previously elected
Annapolis County	Joseph A. Bancroft	Liberal	1894
Annapolis County	J. W. Longley	Liberal	1882
Annapolis County	J.W. Longley (1896)	Liberal	1896
Antigonish County	Christopher P. Chisholm	Liberal	1891
Antigonish County	Colin F. McIsaac	Liberal	1886
Antigonish County	Angus McGillivray (1895)	Liberal	1878, 1887, 1895
County of Cape Breton	John McCormick	Liberal-Conservative	1894
County of Cape Breton	William McKay	Liberal-Conservative	1886, 1894
Colchester County	Wilbert D. Dimock	Liberal-Conservative	1894
Colchester County	Frederick Andrew Laurence	Liberal	1886
Colchester County	Firman McClure (1895)	Liberal	1895
Cumberland County	Thomas R. Black	Liberal	1884, 1894
Cumberland County	Alexander E. Fraser	Liberal	1894
Digby County	Ambrose H. Comeau	Liberal	1890
Digby County	Eliakim E. Tupper	Liberal	1890
Digby County	Angus M. Gidney (1895)	Liberal-Conservative	1895
Guysborough County	Daniel H. MacKinnon	Liberal	1894
Guysborough County	John H. Sinclair	Liberal	1894
Halifax County	William A. Black	Liberal-Conservative	1894
Halifax County	William S. Fielding	Liberal	1882
Halifax County	William Roche, Jr.	Liberal	1886
Halifax County	William B. Wallace (1896)	Liberal	1896
Hants County	Arthur Drysdale	Liberal	1891
Hants County	Charles Smith Wilcox	Liberal-Conservative	1894
Inverness County	Alexander Campbell	Liberal-Conservative	1867, 1878, 1894
Inverness County	John H. Jamieson	Liberal-Conservative	1894
Kings County	Brenton H. Dodge	Liberal	1894
Kings County	Harry H. Wickwire	Liberal	1894
Lunenburg County	Charles E. Church	Liberal	1882
Lunenburg County	John D. Sperry	Liberal	1889
Lunenburg County	Allan R. Moreash (1896)	Liberal	1896
Pictou County	William Cameron	Liberal-Conservative	1887
Pictou County	Alexander Grant	Liberal-Conservative	1890
Pictou County	Charles E. Tanner	Liberal-Conservative	1894
Queens County	Albert M. Hemeon	Liberal	1887
Queens County	Richard Hunt	Liberal	1890
Queens County	Edward M. Farrell (1896)	Liberal	1896
Richmond County	Simon Joyce	Liberal	1894
Richmond County	John Morrison	Liberal-Conservative	1894
Richmond County	Joseph Matheson (1894)	Liberal	1886, 1894
Shelburne County	Thomas Johnston	Liberal	1867, 1882
Shelburne County	Thomas Robertson	Liberal	1894
Victoria County	John L. Bethune	Conservative	1886
Victoria County	John G. Morrison	Liberal	1894
Victoria County	George Henry Murray (1896)	Liberal	1896
Yarmouth County	William Law	Liberal	1886
Yarmouth County	Albert A. Pothier	Liberal-Conservative	1894

== Notes ==
Preceded by 30th General Assembly of Nova Scotia	General Assemblies of Nova Scotia; 1894–1897	Succeeded by 32nd General Assembly of Nova Scotia
