= 43rd General Assembly of Nova Scotia =

The 43rd General Assembly of Nova Scotia represented Nova Scotia between March 14, 1946, and April 27, 1949.

== Division of seats ==
There were 30 members of the General Assembly, elected in the 1945 Nova Scotia general election.

| Leader | Party | # of Seats |
|---|---|---|
| Frederick Murray Blois | Conservative | 0 |
| Angus L. Macdonald | Liberal | 28 |
| Donald MacDonald | CCF | 2 |
| Total | | 30 |

== List of members ==
| Riding | Name | Party | First elected / previously elected | Position |
|---|---|---|---|---|
| Annapolis County | Henry Davies Hicks | Liberal | 1945 | |
| Antigonish | John Patrick Gorman | Liberal | 1942 | |
| Cape Breton South | John Smith MacIvor | Liberal | 1945 | |
| Cape Breton Centre | Michael McDonald | CCF | 1945 | |
| Cape Breton North | Alexander O'Handley | Liberal | 1925, (Note: Cape Breton East (First elected as a Conservative)) 1941 | |
| Cape Breton East | Russell Cunningham | CCF | 1945 | |
| Cape Breton West | Malcolm A. Patterson | Liberal | 1937 | Provincial secretary (1947) |
| Colchester | Gordon T. Purdy | Liberal | 1945 | |
| Colchester | Robert F. McLellan | Liberal | 1945 | |
| Cumberland | Kenneth Judson Cochrane | Liberal | 1941 | |
| Cumberland | Martin J. Kaufman | Liberal | 1945 | |
| Digby | J. Willie Comeau | Liberal | 1907, 1920, 1928 | |
| Guysborough | Arthur Whittier MacKenzie | Liberal | 1945 | Minister of Agriculture |
| Halifax South | Angus L.MacDonald | Liberal | 1933, 1945 | Premier |
| Halifax Centre | James Edward Rutledge | Liberal | 1939 | |
| Halifax North | Harold Connolly | Liberal | 1936 | Minister of Industry |
| Halifax East | Geoffrey W. Stevens | Liberal | 1933 | |
| Halifax West | Ronald Manning Fielding | Liberal | 1941 | |
| Hants | Robert A. MacLellan | Liberal | 1945 | |
| Inverness | Alexander H. McKinnon | Liberal | 1940 | |
| Kings | David Durell Sutton | Liberal | 1945 | |
| Lunenburg | Frank R. Davis | Liberal | 1933 | |
| Lunenburg | Gordon E. Romkey | Liberal | 1928 | speaker |
| Pictou | Josiah H. MacQuarrie | Liberal | 1933 | Attorney General |
| Pictou | Alfred B. DeWolfe | Liberal | 1945 | |
| Queens | Merrill D. Rawding | Liberal | 1945 | |
| Richmond | Lauchlin Daniel Currie | Liberal | 1933, (Note: Cape Breton East) 1941 | |
| Shelburne | Wilfred Tennyson Dauphinee | Liberal | 1941 | |
| Victoria | John M. Campbell | Liberal | 1937 | |
| Yarmouth | Henry A. Waterman | Liberal | 1938 | |

== Former members of the 43rd General Assembly ==
| Name | Party | Electoral District | Cause of departure | Succeeded by | Elected |
|---|---|---|---|---|---|
| Josiah H. MacQuarrie | Liberal | Pictou | named judge | | 1947 |

== Notes ==
| Preceded by 42nd General Assembly of Nova Scotia | General Assemblies of Nova Scotia; 1945–1949 | Succeeded by 44th General Assembly of Nova Scotia |
