= 32nd Nova Scotia general election =

The 32nd Nova Scotia general election may refer to

- the 1897 Nova Scotia general election, the 31st overall general election for Nova Scotia, for the (due to a counting error in 1859) 32nd General Assembly of Nova Scotia,
- the 1901 Nova Scotia general election, the 32nd overall general election for Nova Scotia, for the 33rd General Assembly of Nova Scotia, but considered the 10th general election for the Canadian province of Nova Scotia, or
- the 1988 Nova Scotia general election, the 54th overall general election for Nova Scotia, for the 55th Legislative Assembly of Nova Scotia, but considered the 32nd general election for the Canadian province of Nova Scotia.
