= Leader of the Opposition (Nova Scotia) =

The leader of the Opposition (French: Chef de l'Opposition) in Nova Scotia is the MLA in the Nova Scotia House of Assembly who leads the political party recognized as the Official Opposition. This status generally goes to the leader of the second largest party in the Legislative Assembly. Claudia Chender, the leader of the Nova Scotia New Democratic Party, is the current leader of the opposition.

Since 1928, when its upper house, the Legislative Council of Nova Scotia was abolished, the province has had a unicameral parliamentary government. From Confederation, however, Nova Scotia has exclusively followed the modern Westminster convention whereby the leader of the opposition is the leader of the party that controls the second most seats in the House of Assembly.

== Leaders of the opposition of the colony of Nova Scotia (1847–1866) ==
Picture	Name	Party	Term
	James W. Johnston	Conservative	1848–1857
	William Young	Liberal	1857–1860
	James W. Johnston	Conservative	1860–1864
	A.G. Archibald	Liberal	1864–1867

== Leaders of the opposition of the Province of Nova Scotia, since Confederation (1867–present) ==
Picture	Name	Party	Term
	Hiram Blanchard	Liberal Conservative	1867–1874
	Simon H. Holmes	Conservative	1875–1878
	N/A	Liberal	1879–1882
	Adam C. Bell	Liberal Conservative	1883–1886
	William McKay	Liberal Conservative	1887–1890
	C.H. Cahan	Liberal Conservative	1891–1894
	William McKay	Liberal Conservative	1895–1897
	Charles S. Wilcox	Liberal Conservative	1898–1901
	Charles E. Tanner	Liberal Conservative	1902–1908
	Charles S. Wilcox	Liberal Conservative	1909
	John M. Baillie	Liberal Conservative	1910–1911
	Charles E. Tanner	Liberal Conservative	1912–1916
	W.L. Hall	Liberal Conservative	1917–1920
	Daniel G. McKenzie	United Farmers/Labour	1921–1925
	William Chisholm	Liberal	1926–1930
	Alexander S. MacMillan	Liberal	1931–1933
	Gordon S. Harrington	Conservative	1934–1937
	Percy C. Black	Conservative	1938–1939
	Fred M. Blois	Conservative	1940
	Leonard W. Fraser	Conservative	1941
	Fred M. Blois	Conservative	1942–1945
	Russell Cunningham	CCF	1946–1949
	Robert L. Stanfield	Progressive Conservative	1950–1956
	Henry D. Hicks	Liberal	1957–1960
	Earl W. Urquhart	Liberal	1961–1963
	Peter M. Nicholson	Liberal	1964–1967
	Gerald A. Regan	Liberal	1968–1970
	George I. Smith	Progressive Conservative	1970–1971
	John Buchanan	Progressive Conservative	1971–1978
	Gerald A. Regan	Liberal	1978–1979
	Benoit Comeau	Liberal	1980
	A.M. (Sandy) Cameron	Liberal	1980–1984
	Vincent MacLean	Liberal	1985
	Bill Gillis	Liberal	1985–1986
	Vincent MacLean	Liberal	1986–1992
	Bill Gillis	Liberal	1992–1993
	Terrence Donahoe	Progressive Conservative	1993–1995
	John Hamm	Progressive Conservative	1995–1998
	Robert Chisholm	New Democratic Party	1998–1999
	Robert Chisholm (NDP), Russell MacLellan (Liberal), Wayne Gaudet (Liberal)	Duties shared between Liberals and NDP	1999–2001
	John MacDonell	New Democratic Party	2001
	Darrell Dexter	New Democratic Party	2001–2009
	Stephen McNeil	Liberal	2009–2013
	Jamie Baillie	Progressive Conservative	2013–2018
	Karla MacFarlane	Progressive Conservative	2018
	Tim Houston	Progressive Conservative	2018–2021
	Iain Rankin	Liberal	2021–2022
	Zach Churchill	Liberal	2022–2024
	Claudia Chender	New Democratic Party	2024–present
