= 30th Nova Scotia general election =

The 30th Nova Scotia general election may refer to

- the 1890 Nova Scotia general election, the 29th overall general election for Nova Scotia, for the (due to a counting error in 1859) 30th General Assembly of Nova Scotia,
- the 1894 Nova Scotia general election, the 30th overall general election for Nova Scotia, for the 31st General Assembly of Nova Scotia, but considered the 8th general election for the Canadian province of Nova Scotia, or
- the 1981 Nova Scotia general election, the 52nd overall general election for Nova Scotia, for the 53rd Legislative Assembly of Nova Scotia, but considered the 30th general election for the Canadian province of Nova Scotia.
