= 35th Nova Scotia general election =

The 35th Nova Scotia general election may refer to

- the 1911 Nova Scotia general election, the 34th overall general election for Nova Scotia, for the (due to a counting error in 1859) 35th General Assembly of Nova Scotia,
- the 1916 Nova Scotia general election, the 35th overall general election for Nova Scotia, for the 36th General Assembly of Nova Scotia, but considered the 13th general election for the Canadian province of Nova Scotia, or
- the 1999 Nova Scotia general election, the 57th overall general election for Nova Scotia, for the 58th Legislative Assembly of Nova Scotia, but considered the 35th general election for the Canadian province of Nova Scotia.
