= Matthew Henry Fitzpatrick =

Canadian politician from Nova Scotia (1845–1905)

Member of the Nova Scotia House of Assembly for Pictou County
- In office April 20, 1897 – October 1, 1901

Personal details
- Born: February 15, 1845 Fitzpatrick's Mountain, Nova Scotia
- Died: February 16, 1905 (aged 60) London, England
- Party: Liberal Conservative
- Spouse: Margaret Steele
- Occupation: farmer, manufacturer, railway construction contractor, politician

Matthew Henry Fitzpatrick (February 15, 1845 – February 16, 1905) was a farmer, manufacturer, and political figure in Nova Scotia, Canada. He represented Pictou County in the Nova Scotia House of Assembly from 1897 to 1901 as a Liberal Conservative member.

Fitzpatrick was born in 1845 at Fitzpatrick's Mountain, Nova Scotia to James Fitzpatrick and Margaret Henry. He married Margaret Steele. He was involved in railway construction and was associated with business activities connected to the Nova Scotia Eastern Railway Company. Fitzpatrick died in 1905 in London, England.

He was elected in the 1897 Nova Scotia general election and did not contest the 1901 Nova Scotia general election.
