= 43rd Nova Scotia general election =

The 43rd Nova Scotia general election may refer to

- the 1945 Nova Scotia general election, the 42nd overall general election for Nova Scotia, for the (due to a counting error in 1859) 43rd General Assembly of Nova Scotia, or
- the 1949 Nova Scotia general election, the 43rd overall general election for Nova Scotia, for the 44th General Assembly of Nova Scotia, but considered the 21st general election for the Canadian province of Nova Scotia.
