= Ernest G. Irish =

Canadian politician (1894–1955)

MLA for Pictou County
- In office 1941–1945
- Preceded by: Newton G. Munro
- Succeeded by: Alfred B. DeWolfe

Personal details
- Born: November 27, 1894 Afton, Nova Scotia
- Died: June 27, 1955 (aged 60) Pictou, Nova Scotia
- Party: Progressive Conservative
- Occupation: hotel owner

Ernest George Irish (November 27, 1894 – June 27, 1955) was a Canadian politician. He represented the electoral district of Pictou County in the Nova Scotia House of Assembly from 1941 to 1945. He was a member of the Progressive Conservative Party of Nova Scotia.

Born in 1894 at Afton, Antigonish County, Nova Scotia, Irish was a hotel owner and manager. He married Margaret Mare Wilkes in 1920. Irish entered provincial politics in 1941, when he was elected in the dual-member Pictou County riding with Liberal Josiah H. MacQuarrie. In the 1945 election, Irish was defeated by both Liberal candidates, MacQuarrie and Alfred B. DeWolfe. Irish attempted to enter federal politics in the 1949 federal election, but was defeated as the Progressive Conservative candidate by Liberal incumbent Henry Byron McCulloch in the Pictou riding. Irish died at Pictou on June 27, 1955.
