= 1945 Nova Scotia general election =

Canadian provincial election

- October 23, 1945

30 seats of the Nova Scotia House of Assembly 16 seats needed for a majority
- Turnout: 64.68% ▲1.63pp
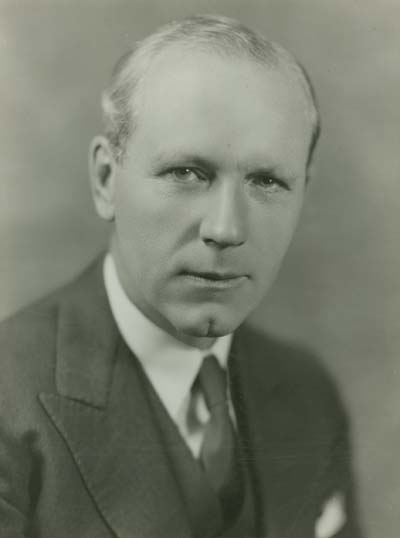

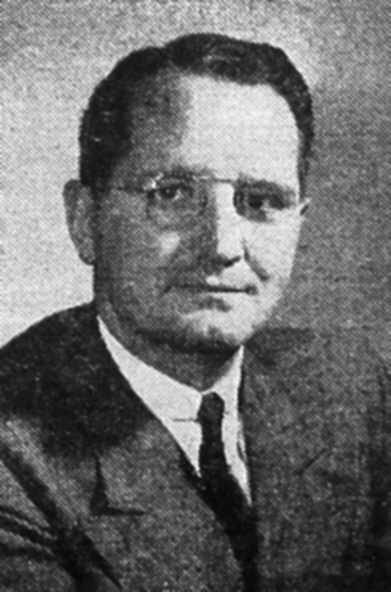
	First party	Second party	Third party
			PC
Leader	Angus Lewis Macdonald	Donald MacDonald	Frederick Murray Blois
Party	Liberal	Co-operative Commonwealth	Progressive Conservative
Leader since	August 31, 1945	1941	1940
Leader's seat	Halifax South	Cape Breton South (Lost re-election)	Colchester (Lost re-election)
Last election	23	3	4
Seats won	28	2	0
Seat change	▲5	▼1	▼4
Popular vote	153,493	39,637	95,573
Percentage	53.1%	13.6%	33.5%
Swing	▲0.5pp	▲6.6pp	▼7.8pp
Premier before election
Angus Lewis Macdonald
Liberal
Premier after election
Angus Lewis Macdonald
Liberal

The 1945 Nova Scotia general election was held on 23 October 1945 to elect members of the 43rd House of Assembly of the province of Nova Scotia, Canada. It was won by the Liberal party. The Progressive Conservatives were entirely shut out of the Assembly, making the CCF's two MLAs the only opposition members.

== Results ==
=== Results by party ===
↓
28	2
Liberal	CCF

Official results
Party	Party leader	# of candidates	Seats				Popular vote		
Party	Party leader	# of candidates	1941	Dissolution	Elected	Change	#	%	Change (pp)
Liberal	Angus Lewis Macdonald	30	22		28	+6	153,493	53.05%	+0.14%
Co-operative Commonwealth	Donald MacDonald	20	3		2	-1	39,637	13.70%	+6.57%
Progressive Conservative	Frederick Murray Blois	29	5		0	-5	95,573	33.03%	-6.93%
Independent/Other		3	0		0	0	634	0.22%	N/A
Vacant									
Total valid votes							289,337	99.37%	–
Blank and invalid ballots							1,697	0.58%	–
Total		82	30	30	30	–	291,034	100.00%	–
Registered voters / turnout							370,945	64.68%	

Popular vote
Liberal	53.05%
PC	33.03%
CCF	13.70%
Others	0.22%

Seats summary
Liberal	93.33%
CCF	6.67%

== Retiring incumbents ==
Co-operative Commonwealth

- Douglas Neil Brodie, Cape Breton East
- Douglas MacDonald, Cape Breton Centre

Liberal

- Alexander Stirling MacMillan, Hants
- Harry Dennis Madden, Queens
- John McDonald, Kings
- John D. McKenzie, Annapolis
- Havelock Torrey, Guysborough

Progressive Conservative

- George Scott Dickey, Colchester

== Nominated candidates ==
Legend
bold denotes party leader
† denotes an incumbent who is not running for re-election or was defeated in nomination contest

=== Valley ===
Electoral district	Candidates				Incumbent
Electoral district	Liberal	PC	CCF	Independent	Incumbent
Annapolis	Henry Hicks; 4,880; 59.06%	Horton Wheelock Phinney; 3,383; 40.94%			John D. McKenzie†
Digby	Joseph William Comeau; 4,714; 59.13%	Kenneth Earl Smith; 2,706; 33.94%	Edgar Lawrence Outhouse; 552; 6.92%		Joseph William Comeau
Hants	Robert A. MacLellan; 4,951; 52.66%	Norman Dudley Murray; 3,194; 33.98%	Frederick Charles Gilmore Scott; 1,256; 13.36%		Alexander Stirling MacMillan†
Kings	David Durell Sutton; 7,027; 59.66%	William Lawrence Chisholm; 4,751; 40.34%			John Alexander McDonald†

=== South Shore ===
Electoral district	Candidates				Incumbent
Electoral district	Liberal	PC	CCF	Independent	Incumbent
Lunenburg	Frank R. Davis; 6,867; 27.31%	R. Clifford Levy; 5,854; 23.28%			Frank R. Davis
Lunenburg	Gordon E. Romkey; 6,839; 27.20%	James A. MacLeod; 5,585; 22.21%			Gordon E. Romkey
Queens	Merrill D. Rawding; 2,844; 48.17%	Leonard William Fraser; 2,503; 42.39%	Clarence Webber; 557; 9.43%		Harry Dennis Madden†
Shelburne	Wilfred Dauphinee; 3,214; 55.85%	Frederick William Bower; 2,203; 38.28%	Cecil James O'Donnell; 338; 5.87%		Wilfred Dauphinee
Yarmouth	Henry A. Waterman; 5,000; 55.20%	Frank Parker Day; 4,058; 44.80%			Henry A. Waterman

=== Fundy-Northeast ===
Electoral district	Candidates				Incumbent
Electoral district	Liberal	PC	CCF	Independent	Incumbent
Colchester	Gordon Purdy; 7,714; 29.18%	**Frederick Murray Blois**; 5,515; 20.86%	Clarence Vincent Fleury; 547; 2.07%		Frederick Murray Blois
Colchester	Robert F. McLellan; 6,631; 25.09%	William A. Flemming; 5,383; 20.37%	Sidney Mansfield Parker; 642; 2.43%		George Scott Dickey†
Cumberland	Martin J. Kaufman; 6,540; 21.67%	Archie B. Smith; 6,271; 20.77%	John James Crummey; 2,867; 9.50%		Archie B. Smith
Cumberland	Kenneth Judson Cochrane; 6,995; 23.17%	Norman Shaw Sanford; 5,807; 19.24%	Joseph Bernard Murray; 1,706; 5.65%		Kenneth Judson Cochrane

=== Halifax/Dartmouth/Eastern Shore ===
Electoral district	Candidates				Incumbent
Electoral district	Liberal	PC	CCF	Independent	Incumbent
Halifax Centre	James Edward Rutledge; 4,737; 55.22%	Carl Palm Bethune; 2,279; 26.57%	R.B. Mitchell; 1,562; 18.21%		James Edward Rutledge
Halifax East	Geoffrey W. Stevens; 6,206; 53.48%	A.L. Mattatall; 3,033; 26.14%	Cecil Clyde Russell; 2,366; 20.39%		Geoffrey W. Stevens
Halifax North	Harold Connolly; 6,089; 59.43%	Bernard Joseph Vaughan; 1,777; 17.34%	Thomas Burgess; 2,120; 20.69%	Alexander Munro; 260; 2.54%	Harold Connolly
Halifax South	**Angus Lewis Macdonald**; 5,181; 61.26%	Arthur John Haliburton; 2,067; 24.44%	Richard Leo Rooney; 1,080; 12.77%	Andrew Matthews; 129; 1.53%	Vacant
Halifax West	Ronald Manning Fielding; 4,997; 49.11%	Malcolm Edgbert Walker; 2,786; 27.38%	Fred Young; 2,392; 23.51%		Ronald Manning Fielding

=== Central Nova ===
Electoral district	Candidates				Incumbent
Electoral district	Liberal	PC	CCF	Independent	Incumbent
Antigonish	John Patrick Gorman; 2,650; 61.83%	Douglas MacDonald; 1,636; 38.17%			John Patrick Gorman
Guysborough	Arthur W. MacKenzie; 3,456; 62.07%	Harold Vans Hudson; 2,112; 37.93%			Havelock Torrey†
Pictou	Alfred B. DeWolfe; 9,020; 24.83%	Ernest G. Irish; 7,061; 19.44%	G. Miller Dick; 1,576; 4.34%	George J. White; 245; 0.67%	Ernest G. Irish
Pictou	Josiah H. MacQuarrie; 10,031; 27.61%	John A. MacGregor; 6,704; 18.46%	Donald L. Nicholson; 1,688; 4.65%		Josiah H. MacQuarrie

=== Cape Breton ===
Electoral district	Candidates				Incumbent
Electoral district	Liberal	PC	CCF	Independent	Incumbent
Cape Breton Centre	Ronald McIsaac; 2,726; 38.37%	Frank Doucette; 518; 7.29%	Michael James MacDonald; 3,860; 54.34%		Douglas MacDonald†
Cape Breton East	Gus McGillivray; 2,719; 30.03%	Kenneth Daniel Beaton; 1,002; 11.07%	Russell Cunningham; 5,332; 58.90%		Douglas Neil Brodie†
Cape Breton North	Alexander O'Handley; 3,328; 38.48%	Malcolm McDonald; 2,416; 27.94%	Wendell Coldwell; 2,904; 33.58%		Alexander O'Handley
Cape Breton South	John Smith MacIvor; 4,778; 43.10%	Malcolm Cameron; 1,861; 16.79%	**Donald MacDonald**; 4,448; 40.12%		Donald MacDonald
Cape Breton West	Malcolm A. Patterson; 2,826; 49.82%	Horace L. Ferguson; 1,002; 17.67%	Robert Orr; 1,844; 32.51%		Malcolm A. Patterson
Inverness	Alexander H. McKinnon; 5,283; 70.59%	Alexander Angus MacInnes; 2,201; 29.41%			Alexander H. McKinnon
Richmond	Lauchlin Daniel Currie; 3,149; 76.66%	Frederick Albert Thurgood; 959; 23.34%			Lauchlin Daniel Currie
Victoria	John Malcolm Campbell; 2,101; 64.69%	William Ross MacAulay; 1,147; 35.31%			John Malcolm Campbell
