= Jeffrey McColl =

Canadian politician from Nova Scotia (1833-1900

Member of the Nova Scotia House of Assembly for Pictou County
- In office June 20, 1882 – May 20, 1890

Personal details
- Born: June 16, 1833 Guysborough, Nova Scotia
- Died: March 3, 1900 (aged 66) New Glasgow, Nova Scotia
- Party: Liberal
- Spouse: Ann McGregor ()
- Occupation: shipbuilder, businessman, politician

Jeffrey McColl (June 16, 1833 – March 3, 1900) was a shipbuilder, businessman, and political figure in Nova Scotia, Canada. He represented Pictou County in the Nova Scotia House of Assembly from 1886 to 1890 as a Liberal member. He married Ann McGregor, the sister of James Drummond McGregor. McColl died in 1900 in New Glasgow, Nova Scotia. He was elected in the 1882 and the 1886 Nova Scotia general election.
