= James Drummond McGregor =

Canadian politician (1838–1918)

The Honourable James Drummond McGregor
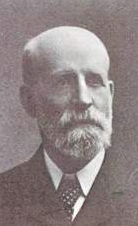

10th Lieutenant Governor of Nova Scotia
- In office October 18, 1910 – October 19, 1915
- Monarch: George V
- Governors General: The Earl Grey; The Duke of Connaught and Strathearn
- Premier: George Henry Murray
- Preceded by: Duncan Cameron Fraser
- Succeeded by: David MacKeen

Senator for New Glasgow, Nova Scotia
- In office April 24, 1903 – October 1910
- Appointed by: Wilfrid Laurier

Member of the Nova Scotia House of Assembly for Pictou County
- In office May 21, 1890 – March 15, 1894 Serving with William Cameron, Alexander Grant
- Preceded by: Adam C. Bell; William Cameron; Jeffrey McColl; Charles H. Munro
- Succeeded by: William Cameron; Alexander Grant; Charles E. Tanner
- In office April 20, 1897 – October 9, 1900 Serving with M.H. Fitzpatrick, E.M. MacDonald
- Preceded by: William Cameron; Alexander Grant; Charles E. Tanner
- Succeeded by: E.M. MacDonald; George Patterson; Charles E. Tanner

Personal details
- Born: 1 September 1838 New Glasgow, Nova Scotia
- Died: 4 March 1918 (aged 79) New Glasgow, Nova Scotia
- Party: Liberal
- Spouses: Elizabeth A. McColl (m. 1867) Roberta Ridley (m. 1894)
- Children: 3
- Occupation: Businessman
- Profession: Politician

James Drummond McGregor (1 September 1838 – 4 March 1918) was a Canadian businessman, politician, and the tenth Lieutenant Governor of Nova Scotia.

Born in New Glasgow, Nova Scotia, the son of Roderick MacGregor and Janet Chisholm, both of Scottish descent, he was mayor of New Glasgow from 1879 to 1880. In 1867, MacGregor married Elizabeth McColl. He represented Pictou County in the Nova Scotia House of Assembly from 1890 to 1894 and from 1897 to 1900. MacGregor married Roberta Ridley in 1894. In 1900, he ran unsuccessfully for the House of Commons of Canada in the riding of Pictou. MacGregor was appointed to the Senate of Canada in 1903 representing the senatorial division of New Glasgow, Nova Scotia. A Liberal, he resigned in 1910 when he was appointed lieutenant governor of Nova Scotia. He served until 1915. MacGregor died in New Glasgow at the age of 79.

His son Robert also represented Pictou County in the provincial assembly.
