= John Welsford Macdonald =

Canadian politician and judge from Nova Scotia (1890–1976)

Member of the Nova Scotia House of Assembly for Pictou County
- In office July 27, 1920 – June 24, 1925

Judge of the County Court of Nova Scotia
- In office June 29, 1939 – January 1964

Personal details
- Born: July 23, 1890 Pictou, Nova Scotia
- Died: October 10, 1976 (aged 86) Pictou, Nova Scotia
- Party: Liberal
- Spouse: Mary Blanche Graham
- Parent: Edward Mortimer Macdonald (father)
- Education: University of Toronto (BA); Dalhousie University (LLB)
- Occupation: barrister, politician, judge

John Welsford Macdonald (July 23, 1890 – October 10, 1976) was a barrister, judge, and political figure in Nova Scotia, Canada. He represented Pictou County in the Nova Scotia House of Assembly from 1920 to 1925 as a Liberal member.

Macdonald was born in 1890 at Pictou, Nova Scotia to Edward Mortimer Macdonald and Edith Lilian Ives. He was educated at Pictou Academy, the University of Toronto completing a Bachelor of Arts in 1911, and Dalhousie University completing a Bachelor of Law in 1914. Macdonald was appointed King's Counsel in 1925. He married Mary Blanche Graham on December 17, 1924. During the First World War, he served overseas with the Canadian Expeditionary Force as a major in the 85th, the Nova Scotia Highlanders (193rd), and 185th Battalions. He was wounded at the Battle of Amiens, and was awarded the Military Cross. In 1931, he served as colonel of the 18th Infantry Brigade. Macdonald was appointed judge of the County Court for District 5 on June 29, 1939, serving until January 1964. He died in 1976 at Pictou, Nova Scotia.

He was elected in the 1920 Nova Scotia general election but was unsuccessful in the 1925 Nova Scotia general election.
