= Newton G. Munro =

Canadian politician

MLA for Pictou
- In office 1937–1941
- Preceded by: Donald F. Fraser
- Succeeded by: Ernest G. Irish

Personal details
- Born: June 13, 1870 Hopewell, Nova Scotia
- Died: July 21, 1949 (aged 79) Wolfville, Nova Scotia
- Party: Liberal

Newton Goodwill Munro (June 13, 1870 – July 21, 1949) was a Canadian politician. He represented the electoral district of Pictou in the Nova Scotia House of Assembly from 1937 to 1941. He was a member of the Nova Scotia Liberal Party.

Born in 1870 in Hopewell, Nova Scotia, Munro was a railway agent and stationmaster by career. He married Mary E. Shaw in 1895, and then Sylvia Keith. Munro served as mayor of Stellarton, Nova Scotia, from 1923 to 1931. Munro entered provincial politics in 1937 when he was elected in the dual-member Pictou County riding with Liberal Josiah H. MacQuarrie. In the 1941 election, Munro was defeated by MacQuarrie and Conservative Ernest G. Irish. Munro died in Wolfville on July 21, 1949.
