= Robert Henry Graham =

Canadian politician and judge from Nova Scotia (1870–1956)

Member of the Nova Scotia House of Assembly for Pictou County
- In office June 20, 1916 – June 24, 1925

Justice of the Supreme Court of Nova Scotia
- In office May 25, 1925 – 1949

Personal details
- Born: November 30, 1870 New Glasgow, Nova Scotia
- Died: May 28, 1956 (aged 85) Halifax, Nova Scotia
- Party: Liberal
- Spouse: Maud Mary Johnston
- Education: Dalhousie University (BA; LLB)
- Occupation: barrister, politician, judge

Robert Henry Graham (November 30, 1870 – May 28, 1956) was a barrister, political figure, and judge in Nova Scotia, Canada. He represented Pictou County in the Nova Scotia House of Assembly from 1916 to 1925 as a Liberal member.

Graham was born in 1870 at New Glasgow, Nova Scotia to John Graham and Jane Marshall. He was educated at Dalhousie University, earning a Bachelor of Arts in 1892 and an Bachelor of Law in 1894, and was appointed King's Counsel in 1913. He married Maud Mary Johnston on December 4, 1901. He served as a town councillor in New Glasgow in 1896 and as mayor from 1899 to 1900, and later served as a stipendiary magistrate from 1906 to 1910. Graham was appointed a justice of the Supreme Court of Nova Scotia on May 25, 1925, serving until his retirement in 1949, including acting chief justice. Graham died in 1956 at Halifax, Nova Scotia.

He was elected in the 1916 Nova Scotia general election and re-elected in the 1920 Nova Scotia general election, and did not contest the 1925 Nova Scotia general election.
