= 1941 Nova Scotia general election =

Canadian provincial election

- October 28, 1941

30 seats of the Nova Scotia House of Assembly 16 seats needed for a majority
- Turnout: 63.05% ▼16.62pp
	First party	Second party	Third party
	Lib	PC	CCF
Leader	Alexander Stirling MacMillan	Frederick Murray Blois	No leader
Party	Liberal	Progressive Conservative	Co-operative Commonwealth
Leader since	July 10, 1940	1940
Leader's seat	Hants	Colchester
Last election	25	5	Did not contest
Seats won	23	4	3
Seat change	▼2	▼1	▲3
Popular vote	137,884	104,123	18,583
Percentage	52.7%	40.3%	7.0%
Swing	0.0pp	▼5.5pp	▲7.0pp
Premier before election
Alexander Stirling MacMillan
Liberal
Premier after election
Alexander Stirling MacMillan
Liberal

The 1941 Nova Scotia general election was held on 28 October 1941 to elect members of the 42nd House of Assembly of the province of Nova Scotia, Canada. It was won by the Liberal party.

== Results ==
=== Results by party ===
↓
23	4	3
Liberal	Progressive Conservative	CCF

Official results
Party	Party leader	# of candidates	Seats				Popular vote		
Party	Party leader	# of candidates	1937	Dissolution	Elected	Change	#	%	Change (pp)
Liberal	Angus Lewis Macdonald	30	24		22	-2	137,884	52.91%	-0.02%
Progressive Conservative	Frederick Murray Blois	28	5		5	0	104,123	39.96%	-6.02%
Co-operative Commonwealth		6	0	0	3	+3	18,583	7.13%	N/A
Vacant									
Total valid votes							260,590	99.37%	–
Blank and invalid ballots							1,651	0.63%	–
Total		64	30	30	30	–	262,241	100.00%	–
Registered voters / turnout							341,788	63.05%	-6.23%

* The CCF ran in the 1933 election but did not run any candidates in 1937. The party elected 1 MLA in the 1939 Cape Breton East by-election.

Popular vote
Liberal	52.70%
PC	40.30%
CCF	7.00%

Seats summary
Liberal	73.33%
PC	16.67%
CCF	10.00%

== Retiring incumbents ==
Liberal

- Henry R. L. Bill, Shelburne
- George Belcher Murray, Cape Breton North

== Nominated candidates ==
Legend
bold denotes party leader
† denotes an incumbent who is not running for re-election or was defeated in nomination contest

=== Valley ===
Electoral district	Candidates			Incumbent
Electoral district	Liberal	PC	CCF	Incumbent
Annapolis	John D. McKenzie; 4,292; 60.60%	Hanson Taylor Dowell; 2,790; 39.40%		John D. McKenzie
Digby	Joseph William Comeau; 4,818; 62.34%	James John Wallis; 2,910; 37.66%		Joseph William Comeau
Hants	**Alexander Stirling MacMillan**; 4,871; 57.56%	Norman Dexter Blanchard; 3,592; 42.44%		Alexander Stirling MacMillan
Kings	John Alexander McDonald; 6,654; 62.58%	Raymond Crosby; 3,978; 37.42%		John Alexander McDonald

=== South Shore ===
Electoral district	Candidates			Incumbent
Electoral district	Liberal	PC	CCF	Incumbent
Lunenburg	Frank R. Davis; 6,366; 29.39%	R. Clifford Levy; 4,601; 21.24%		Frank R. Davis
Lunenburg	Gordon E. Romkey; 6,288; 29.03%	Angus J. Walters; 4,404; 20.33%		Gordon E. Romkey
Queens	Harry Dennis Madden; 2,461; 50.13%	John J. Cameron; 2,448; 49.87%		John J. Cameron
Shelburne	Wilfred Dauphinee; 2,422; 50.73%	Frederick William Bower; 2,352; 49.27%		Henry R. L. Bill†
Yarmouth	Henry A. Waterman; 4,551; 63.02%	Peter Lorimer Judge; 2,670; 36.98%		Henry A. Waterman

=== Fundy-Northeast ===
Electoral district	Candidates			Incumbent
Electoral district	Liberal	PC	CCF	Incumbent
Colchester	Alexander Murdoch Sutherland; 5,160; 23.74%	**Frederick Murray Blois**; 5,842; 26.88%		Frederick Murray Blois
Colchester	Robert F. McLellan; 5,301; 24.39%	George Scott Dickey; 5,432; 24.99%		George Scott Dickey
Cumberland	Archibald J. Mason; 7,040; 22.87%	Archie B. Smith; 7,954; 25.84%		Archie B. Smith
Cumberland	Kenneth Judson Cochrane; 7,970; 25.90%	Leonard William Fraser; 7,814; 25.39%		Leonard William Fraser

=== Halifax/Dartmouth/Eastern Shore ===
Electoral district	Candidates			Incumbent
Electoral district	Liberal	PC	CCF	Incumbent
Halifax Centre	James Edward Rutledge; 4,226; 59.49%	Arthur Wilfred Morton; 2,878; 40.51%		James Edward Rutledge
Halifax East	Geoffrey W. Stevens; 5,094; 60.39%	Norman Dudley Murray; 3,341; 39.61%		Geoffrey W. Stevens
Halifax North	Harold Connolly; 4,124; 64.98%	Helen Macdonald Lownds; 1,962; 30.91%	James Ronald Clark; 261; 4.11%	Harold Connolly
Halifax South	Joseph Richard Murphy; 4,381; 58.75%	Arthur James Haliburton; 3,076; 41.25%		Joseph Richard Murphy
Halifax West	Ronald Manning Fielding; 4,459; 58.37%	John Shenstone Roper; 3,180; 41.63%		Vacant

=== Central Nova ===
Electoral district	Candidates			Incumbent
Electoral district	Liberal	PC	CCF	Incumbent
Antigonish	John A. MacIsaac; 2,759; 61.49%	Michael Ignatius Webb; 1,728; 38.51%		Vacant
Guysborough	Havelock Torrey; 3,759; 64.15%	John Donald McIntyre; 2,101; 35.85%		Havelock Torrey
Pictou	Newton G. Munro; 7,562; 23.16%	Ernest G. Irish; 8,256; 25.28%		Newton G. Munro
Pictou	Josiah H. MacQuarrie; 8,780; 26.89%	W. Thomas Hayden; 8,055; 24.67%		Josiah H. MacQuarrie

=== Cape Breton ===
Electoral district	Candidates			Incumbent
Electoral district	Liberal	PC	CCF	Incumbent
Cape Breton Centre	Gus Brown; 2,275; 30.96%	John Clifford Gregor; 1,155; 15.72%	Douglas MacDonald; 3,918; 53.32%	Douglas MacDonald
Cape Breton East	Lauchlin Daniel Currie; 4,052; 39.44%		Douglas Neil Brodie; 6,222; 60.56%	Lauchlin Daniel Currie
Cape Breton North	Alexander O'Handley; 3,344; 39.97%	Joseph Angus MacDougall; 2,387; 28.53%	Robert Silas Bartlett; 2,636; 31.50%	George Belcher Murray†
Cape Breton South	George M. Morrison; 3,946; 35.96%	Donald John MacLean; 3,019; 27.51%	Donald MacDonald; 4,008; 36.53%	George M. Morrison
Cape Breton West	Malcolm A. Patterson; 2,306; 41.10%	John Alexander MacDonald; 1,767; 31.49%	Robert Joseph Orr; 1,538; 27.41%	Malcolm A. Patterson
Inverness	Alexander H. McKinnon; 5,302; 63.54%	Alexander Daniel McInnis; 3,043; 36.46%		Alexander H. McKinnon
Richmond	Donald David Boyd; 2,176; 50.59%	Benjamin Amedeé LeBlanc; 2,125; 49.41%		Donald David Boyd
Victoria	John Malcolm Campbell; 2,176; 63.05%	John Roderick Fraser; 1,275; 36.95%		John Malcolm Campbell
