= Edward Mortimer Macdonald =

Canadian politician (1865–1940)

The Hon. Edward Mortimer Macdonald
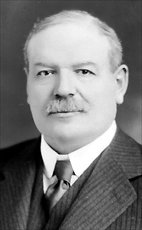

Member of the Canadian Parliament for Antigonish—Guysborough
- In office 1925–1926
- Preceded by: Colin Francis McIsaac
- Succeeded by: John Carey Douglas

Member of the Canadian Parliament for Pictou
- In office 1904–1925
- Preceded by: Adam Carr Bell
- Succeeded by: Alexander McGregor

Member of the Nova Scotia House of Assembly for Pictou
- In office 1897–1904

Personal details
- Born: August 16, 1865 Pictou, Nova Scotia
- Died: May 25, 1940 (aged 74)
- Party: Liberal
- Children: John Welsford Macdonald
- Cabinet: Minister Without Portfolio (1923); Minister of National Defence (1923-1926)

Edward Mortimer Macdonald, PC KC (August 16, 1865 – May 25, 1940) was a Canadian politician.

Born in Pictou, Nova Scotia, the son of John D. and Mary Isabel Macdonald, Macdonald was educated at the Pictou Academy and Dalhousie College where he received a Bachelor of Law in 1887. He was admitted to the Nova Scotia bar in 1887 and the Bar of Quebec in 1918. He was created a King's Counsel in 1904.

He first ran for House of Commons of Canada in the riding of Pictou in the 1896 federal election. Defeated, he lost again in 1900. From 1897 to 1904, he was the Nova Scotia Liberal member of the Nova Scotia House of Assembly for the electoral district of Pictou.

He was elected in the 1904 federal election. A Liberal, he was re-elected in 1908 and 1911. He did not run in 1917, but was elected again in 1921. In April 1923, he was appointed Minister without Portfolio and Minister of National Defence (Acting). From August 1923 to 1926, he was the Minister of National Defence.

== Electoral record ==
1925 Canadian federal election: Antigonish—Guysborough
Party	Candidate	Votes
Liberal	Edward Mortimer Macdonald	6,135
Conservative	Duncan Stewart Chisholm	5,545

1921 Canadian federal election: Pictou
Party	Candidate	Votes
Liberal	Edward Mortimer Macdonald	11,125
Conservative	Thomas Cantley	7,567
Labour	Robert McDonald Reid	1,271

By-election on 6 September 1923 On Mr. MacDonald's acceptance of an office of emolument under the Crown, 15 August 1923
Party	Candidate	Votes
Liberal	Edward Mortimer MacDonald	acclaimed

1917 Canadian federal election: Pictou
Party	Candidate	Votes
Government (Unionist)	Alexander McGregor	6,800
Opposition (Laurier Liberals)	Robert Hugh MacKay	6,043

1911 Canadian federal election: Pictou
Party	Candidate	Votes
Liberal	Edward Mortimer Macdonald	4,221
Conservative	Adam Carr Bell	3,937

1908 Canadian federal election: Pictou
Party	Candidate	Votes
Liberal	Edward Mortimer Macdonald	4,336
Conservative	Charles Elliott Tanner	4,037

1904 Canadian federal election: Pictou
Party	Candidate	Votes
Liberal	Edward Mortimer Macdonald	4,148
Conservative	Adam Carr Bell	3,716

1900 Canadian federal election: Pictou
Party	Candidate	Votes	Elected
Conservative	Charles Hibbert Tupper	3,624	✓
Conservative	Adam Carr Bell	3,615	✓
Liberal	Edward Mortimer Macdonald	3,523	
Liberal	James Drummond McGregor	3,438	
