= Alfred B. DeWolfe =

Canadian politician

MLA for Pictou Centre
- In office 1949–1954
- Preceded by: new riding
- Succeeded by: Donald R. MacLeod

MLA for Pictou
- In office 1945–1949
- Preceded by: Ernest G. Irish
- Succeeded by: riding dissolved

Personal details
- Born: August 18, 1895 Marble Mountain, Nova Scotia
- Died: November 18, 1954 (aged 59) New Glasgow, Nova Scotia
- Party: Liberal
- Occupation: automobile dealer

Alfred Bert DeWolfe (August 18, 1895 – November 18, 1954) was a Canadian politician. He represented the electoral districts of Pictou and Pictou Centre in the Nova Scotia House of Assembly from 1945 to 1954. He was a member of the Nova Scotia Liberal Party.

Born in 1895 at Marble Mountain, Inverness County, Nova Scotia, DeWolfe was an automobile dealer by career. He was educated at the Nova Scotia Technical College. He married Ina Crossan of Scotland.

DeWolfe entered provincial politics in the 1945 election, winning a seat for the dual-member Pictou riding with Liberal Josiah H. MacQuarrie. In 1949, he was re-elected in the new Pictou Centre riding. In August 1950, DeWolfe was appointed to the Executive Council of Nova Scotia as Minister without portfolio. In July 1951, he was shuffled to Provincial Secretary, and also served as Minister of Civil Defence. He was re-elected in the 1953 election. In January 1954, DeWolfe was re-appointed a minister without portfolio, but also took over as chairman of the Nova Scotia Power Commission. DeWolfe died in office on November 18, 1954.
