= Geoffrey W. Stevens =

Canadian politician

MLA for Halifax County Dartmouth
- In office 1956–1960
- Preceded by: new riding
- Succeeded by: Gordon L. S. Hart

MLA for Halifax East
- In office 1933–1956
- Preceded by: new riding
- Succeeded by: Duncan MacMillan

Personal details
- Born: January 16, 1891 Dartmouth, Nova Scotia
- Died: February 7, 1963 (aged 72) Dartmouth, Nova Scotia
- Party: Nova Scotia Liberal Party
- Occupation: pharmacist

Geoffrey W. Stevens (January 16, 1891 – February 7, 1963) was a Canadian politician. He represented the electoral districts of Halifax East and Halifax County Dartmouth in the Nova Scotia House of Assembly from 1933 to 1960. He was a member of the Nova Scotia Liberal Party.

Stevens was born in 1891 in Dartmouth, Nova Scotia. He was educated at Dalhousie University and was a pharmacist by career. He married Helen Lithgow Bauld in 1914.

Stevens entered provincial politics in the 1933 election, defeating Conservative incumbent Josiah Frederick Fraser in the newly established Halifax East riding. He was re-elected in the 1937, 1941, and 1945 elections. In April 1946, Stevens was appointed to the Executive Council of Nova Scotia as Minister for the Nova Scotia Liquor Control Act. He retained the portfolio through re-elections in 1949 and 1953. In the 1956 election, Stevens was re-elected in the new Halifax County Dartmouth riding. He did not reoffer in the 1960 election. Stevens died at Dartmouth on February 7, 1963.
