= Robert Hockin =

Canadian politician

Robert Hockin (1846 – May 1, 1925) was a Canadian politician in Nova Scotia. He represented Pictou County, Nova Scotia in the Nova Scotia House of Assembly from 1882 to 1886 as a Liberal-Conservative member.

He was born in Pictou, Nova Scotia, the son of Daniel Hockin and Elizabeth Milnes, and educated at the Pictou Academy. In 1873, he married Jean, the daughter of Andrew McKinlay, former mayor of Halifax. Hockin served as a member of Pictou city council. After retiring from politics, he was a fisheries inspector. Hockin died in Pictou.
