= Allan Moreash =

Canadian politician (1857–1928)

Allan Rupert Moreash (January 29, 1857 – May 17, 1928) was a merchant and political figure in Nova Scotia, Canada. He represented Lunenburg County in the Nova Scotia House of Assembly from 1896 to 1897 as a Liberal member. His surname also appears as Morash.

== Early life ==
He was the son of Charles Moreash and Sophia Eisenhauer.

== Career ==
He was involved in trade with the West Indies. He was elected to the provincial assembly in an 1896 by-election held after John Drew Sperry resigned his seat to run for a seat in the House of Commons. Moreash was mayor of Lunenburg from 1907 to 1908. He died in Lunenburg at the age of 71.

== Legacy ==
His former home, built by his cousins John and Joseph Morash in 1888, is now designated as a heritage property by the town of Lunenburg.
