= Robert M. McGregor =

Canadian politician

Robert Malcolm McGregor (January 9, 1876 – September 9, 1924) was a wholesale grocer, lumber merchant and political figure in Nova Scotia, Canada. He represented Pictou County in the Nova Scotia House of Assembly from 1904 to 1924 as a Liberal member.

He was born in New Glasgow, Nova Scotia, the son of James Drummond McGregor and Elizabeth McColl, and was educated at Dalhousie University. In 1905, he married Laura McNeil. McGregor served on the board of directors for the Bank of Nova Scotia and the Nova Scotia Steel and Coal Company. He was first elected to the provincial assembly in a 1904 by-election held after Edward Mortimer Macdonald was elected to the House of Commons. McGregor served as a member of the province's Executive Council from 1911 to 1920. He died in office in New Glasgow at the age of 48.
