= George Murray (Nova Scotia politician) =

Canadian politician

George Murray (November 2, 1828 – February 12, 1888) was a medical doctor and political figure in Nova Scotia, Canada. He represented Pictou County in the Nova Scotia House of Assembly from 1867 to 1871 as an Anti-Confederation Party member.

He was born at Barneys River, Pictou County, Nova Scotia, and educated at the Pictou Academy. He received a M.D. in Pennsylvania in 1850. In 1854, he married Mary Patterson. Murray died in New Glasgow, Nova Scotia at the age of 59.
