= George W. Forrest =

Canadian politician

George W. Forrest (1838 – May 11, 1909) was a farmer and political figure. He represented Cumberland County in the Nova Scotia House of Assembly from 1890 to 1894 as a Liberal-Conservative member.

He was born in River Herbert, Cumberland County, Nova Scotia, of Irish descent, and was educated in Amherst. Forrest served as a captain in the militia and as a member of the Municipal Council. He was a valuator for the Intercolonial Railway.

Forrest died on May 11, 1909, in Amherst Point, Nova Scotia.
