= Hugh Allan MacQuarrie =

Canadian politician

Hugh Allan MacQuarrie (November 25, 1874 – February 26, 1942) was an undertaker, furniture dealer and political figure in Nova Scotia, Canada. He represented Pictou County in the Nova Scotia House of Assembly from 1928 to 1933 as a Liberal-Conservative member.

He was born in Stellarton, Nova Scotia, the son of John MacQuarrie and Margaret MacGregor. MacQuarrie married Minnie Elizabeth Walters. He was mayor of Westville in 1920. He died in Westville at the age of 67.
