= George Clarke (Canadian politician) =

Canadian politician

George Clarke (born 1827) was a Canadian merchant and political figure in Nova Scotia, Canada. He represented Colchester County in the Nova Scotia House of Assembly from 1886 to 1894 as a Liberal member.

He was born in Aberdeenshire, Scotland and came to Nova Scotia in 1847. In 1856, he married Agnes Aitcheson. In 1873, Clarke married Elizabeth Bell. Clarke lived in Tatamagouche.
