= Robert Albert Douglas =

Canadian politician

Robert Albert Douglas (June 22, 1887 – January 4, 1959) was a contractor and political figure in Nova Scotia, Canada. He represented Pictou County in the Nova Scotia House of Assembly from 1925 to 1933 as a Liberal-Conservative member.

He was born in Alma, Nova Scotia, the son of John Alexander Douglas and Mary L. Henderson. He married Isa Christine Read. Douglas served on the municipal council for Pictou County from 1922 to 1931. He lived in New Glasgow.
