= Norman Phinney =

Canadian politician

Norman H. Phinney (August 7, 1860 – December 11, 1919) was a Canadian businessman and politician. He represented Annapolis County in the Nova Scotia House of Assembly from 1911 to 1916 as a Liberal member.

== Career ==
He was born in Lawrencetown, Annapolis County, Nova Scotia, the son of Elijah Phinney. He established a company there which sold pianos, organs, phonographs and sewing machines, among other things.

== Family ==
In 1874, he married Jesse Wheelock. Phinney married Emma M. Bishop (née Fitzrandolph) in 1901 after the death of his first wife.
