= Hamilton Morrow =

Canadian politician

MLA for Guysborough County
- In office 1890–1894

Personal details
- Born: June 17, 1846 St. Peter's Bay, Prince Edward Island
- Died: August 6, 1922 (aged 76) Mulgrave, Nova Scotia
- Party: Liberal-Conservative

Hamilton Lane Morrow (June 17, 1846 – August 6, 1922) was a farmer and political figure in Nova Scotia, Canada. He represented Guysborough County in the Nova Scotia House of Assembly from 1890 to 1894 as a Liberal-Conservative member.

He was born in St. Peter's Bay, Prince Edward Island and educated there and at the normal school in Charlottetown. In 1873, he married Mary A. Harty. Morrow taught school in Prince Edward Island for several years. He served as secretary for the Milford Haven Agricultural Society. He died in 1922 of cancer.
