= Angus J. MacDonald =

Canadian politician

Angus John MacDonald (January 17, 1848 – January 13, 1914) was a merchant and political figure in Nova Scotia, Canada. He represented Cape Breton County in the Nova Scotia House of Assembly from 1890 to 1894 as a Liberal member.

Of Scottish descent, MacDonald also served as warden for Cape Breton.
