= Robert S. Copeland =

Canadian politician

Robert S. Copeland (1800 – February 5, 1885) was a merchant, shipbuilder and political figure in Nova Scotia, Canada. He represented Pictou County in the Nova Scotia House of Assembly from 1867 to 1871 as a Reformer.

He was born in Pictou, Nova Scotia, the son of Samuel Copeland. He married Jane Smith. Copeland was a justice of the peace. He lived in Merigomish, Nova Scotia and died there in 1885.
