= Charles H. Munro =

Canadian politician (1837–1908)

Charles Henry Munro (November 18, 1837 – February 6, 1908) was a physician and political figure in Nova Scotia, Canada. He represented Pictou County in the Nova Scotia House of Assembly from 1882 to 1890 as a Liberal-Conservative member.

He was born in West River, Pictou County, Nova Scotia, the son of William Munro and Helen Henderson, and educated at Harvard University. In 1861, he married Annie Hamilton. He died in Westville, Pictou County at the age of 70.
