= Alexander MacKay (politician) =

Canadian politician

Alexander MacKay (April 3, 1818 – February 16, 1882) was a merchant, farmer and political figure in Nova Scotia, Canada. He represented Pictou County in the Nova Scotia House of Assembly from 1862 to 1867 and from 1872 to 1882 as a Conservative member.

He was born in West River, Nova Scotia, the son of John MacKay, a Scottish immigrant. He was educated at Pictou. MacKay first worked as a stone-cutter and builder. He was named a justice of the peace in 1853. MacKay supported Confederation and was defeated when he ran for reelection in 1867. He was elected again in an 1872 by-election held after James McDonald was elected to the House of Commons. MacKay was an elder of the Church of Scotland. In 1851, he married Margaret Mackay. MacKay was elected to the council for Pictou County in 1879.

His son Neil Franklin later served in the legislative assembly for British Columbia.
