= Harry Hatheway Marshall =

Canadian politician (1873–1950)

Harry Hatheway Marshall (November 27, 1873 – August 3, 1950) was an American-born lumberman and political figure in Nova Scotia, Canada. He represented Digby County in the Nova Scotia House of Assembly from 1911 to 1916 as a Liberal-Conservative member.

He was born in Portland, Maine, the son of Richard Marshall and Emily Hunt, and came to Nova Scotia with his family in 1873. He married Lillian Bell. Marshall served as a member of the municipal council. Marshall was elected to the provincial assembly in a 1911 by-election held after Allen Ellsworth Wall resigned his seat to run for a seat in the House of Commons. He was Supervisor of Fisheries from 1916 to 1942. Marshall lived in Digby and died there at the age of 76.
