= Adam Carr Bell =

Canadian politician (1847–1912)

The Hon. Adam Carr Bell

Senator for Pictou, Nova Scotia
- In office October 23, 1911 – October 30, 1912
- Appointed by: Robert Borden

Member of the Canadian Parliament for Pictou
- In office 1896–1904
- Preceded by: Charles Hibbert Tupper
- Succeeded by: Edward Mortimer Macdonald

Member of the Nova Scotia House of Assembly for Pictou
- In office 1878–1887

Personal details
- Born: November 11, 1847 Pictou, Nova Scotia
- Died: October 30, 1912 (aged 64) Montreal, Quebec, Canada
- Party: Conservative
- Other political affiliations: Nova Scotia Conservative
- Cabinet: Provincial Secretary (1882)

Adam Carr Bell (November 11, 1847 – October 30, 1912) was a Canadian politician.

Born in Pictou, Nova Scotia, the son of Basil Bell and Mary Carr, Bell was educated in New Glasgow, Sackville Academy, and Glasgow University. From 1876 to 1877, he was the first mayor of New Glasgow, Nova Scotia (he was mayor again from 1884 to 1885). He was elected to the Nova Scotia House of Assembly in 1878. In 1882, he was Provincial Secretary in the cabinet of John Thompson. From 1882 to 1887 he was the Conservative Party leader and Leader of the Opposition.

In 1896, he was elected to the House of Commons of Canada for the electoral district of Pictou. A Conservative, he was re-elected in 1900. He was defeated in 1904 and 1911.

In 1911, he was summoned to the Senate of Canada on the advice of Robert Borden representing the senatorial division of Pictou, Nova Scotia. He died in office the following year in 1912.

== Electoral history ==
1887 Canadian federal election: Pictou
Party	Candidate	Votes	Elected
Liberal–Conservative	John McDougald	3,413	✓
Conservative	Charles Hibbert Tupper	3,334	✓
Conservative	Adam Carr Bell	2,923	
Independent	John D. McLeod	2,739	

1896 Canadian federal election: Pictou
Party	Candidate	Votes	Elected
Conservative	Charles Hibbert Tupper	3,577	✓
Conservative	Adam Carr Bell	3,503	✓
Liberal	Edward Mortimer Macdonald	3,349	
Liberal	James William Carmichael	3,337	

1900 Canadian federal election: Pictou
Party	Candidate	Votes	Elected
Conservative	Charles Hibbert Tupper	3,624	✓
Conservative	Adam Carr Bell	3,615	✓
Liberal	Edward Mortimer Macdonald	3,523	
Liberal	James Drummond McGregor	3,438	

1904 Canadian federal election: Pictou
Party	Candidate	Votes
Liberal	Edward Mortimer Macdonald	4,148
Conservative	Adam Carr Bell	3,716

1911 Canadian federal election: Pictou
Party	Candidate	Votes
Liberal	Edward Mortimer Macdonald	4,221
Conservative	Adam Carr Bell	3,937

Political offices
Preceded by N/A	Leader of the Opposition of the Province of Nova Scotia; 1882-1887	Succeeded by William McKay
