= Alexander Grant (Nova Scotia politician) =

Canadian politician (1830–1900)

Alexander Grant (1830 – April 30, 1900) was a merchant and political figure in Nova Scotia, Canada. He represented Pictou County in the Nova Scotia House of Assembly from 1890 to 1897 as a Liberal-Conservative member.

He was born in Pictou County, Nova Scotia, the son of Hugh Grant, a Scottish immigrant, and was educated at the Academy there. Grant was a school commissioner, municipal councillor and mayor of Stellarton.
