= William Cameron (Canadian politician) =

Canadian politician (1847–1920)

MLA for Pictou County
- In office 1887 to 1897

Personal details
- Born: September 25, 1847 Sutherland's River, Pictou County, Nova Scotia
- Died: December 11, 1920 (aged 73) Pictou, Nova Scotia
- Party: Conservative Party of Nova Scotia

William Cameron (September 25, 1847 – December 11, 1920) was an educator, farmer and political figure in Nova Scotia, Canada. He represented Pictou County in the Nova Scotia House of Assembly from 1887 to 1897 as a Conservative member.

He was born in Sutherland's River, Pictou County, Nova Scotia, a descendant of Scottish immigrants, and was educated at Dalhousie College. In 1882, he married Mary Catherine Dawson. Cameron taught school and was also a high school principal. He was first elected to the provincial assembly in an 1887 by-election held after Adam Carr Bell resigned his seat to run unsuccessfully for a federal seat.

William Cameron died in 1920. At the time of his death he was serving as county clerk of Pictou County.
