= Robert Hugh MacKay =

Canadian politician

Robert Hugh MacKay (June 30, 1868 – February 18, 1941) was a businessman and political figure in Nova Scotia, Canada. He represented Pictou County in the Nova Scotia House of Assembly from 1909 to 1917 as a Liberal member.

He was born in Riverton, Nova Scotia, the son of Daniel MacKay and Christy Ann Robertson. MacKay was educated in Stellarton. In 1897, he married Margaret Fraser. MacKay was mayor of Westville in 1907. He ran unsuccessfully for a seat in the provincial assembly in 1906. MacKay was an unsuccessful candidate for a seat in the House of Commons in 1917 and 1925.
