= Pictou Academy =

Location
- 200 Louise Street; Pictou, Nova Scotia, B0K 1H0; Canada
- Coordinates: 45°40′50.9″N 62°42′39.9″W

Information
- School type: Secondary School
- Motto: Concordia Salus ((Harmony and Good Health))
- Founded: 1815
- School board: Chignecto - Central Regional School Board
- Superintendent: Dr. Noel Hurley
- Area trustee: Vivian Farrell
- Administrator: Blair MacDonald
- Principal: Starr Pettipas
- Grades: 7-12
- Enrollment: 156 (September 2008)
- Language: English
- Colours: Red and White
- Mascot: Pit bull
- Team name: Pictou Academy Pitbulls
- Website: pa.ccrce.ca
- Last updated: December 12, 2022

Pictou Academy (PA), founded in 1815 by Dr. Thomas McCulloch, is a secondary school in Pictou, Nova Scotia. Prior to the twentieth century, it was a grammar school; a liberal, nonsectarian degree-granting college; and then a secondary school. Pictou Academy's current principal is Starr Pettipas. The Pictou Academy Educational Foundation provides additional funds to the school.

The original site of the academy was designated a National Historic Site of Canada in 1937, as it symbolized the introduction of nonsectarian education to The Maritimes in the early 19th century.

In 2017 the CCRSB elected a board of supervisors to survey the three schools in the town of Pictou. After a vote in the end process of the surveying the board decided upon closing the building constructed in the 1940s and moving Pictou Academy to the building beside what was formerly known as Dr. Thomas McCulloch Middle School.

== History ==
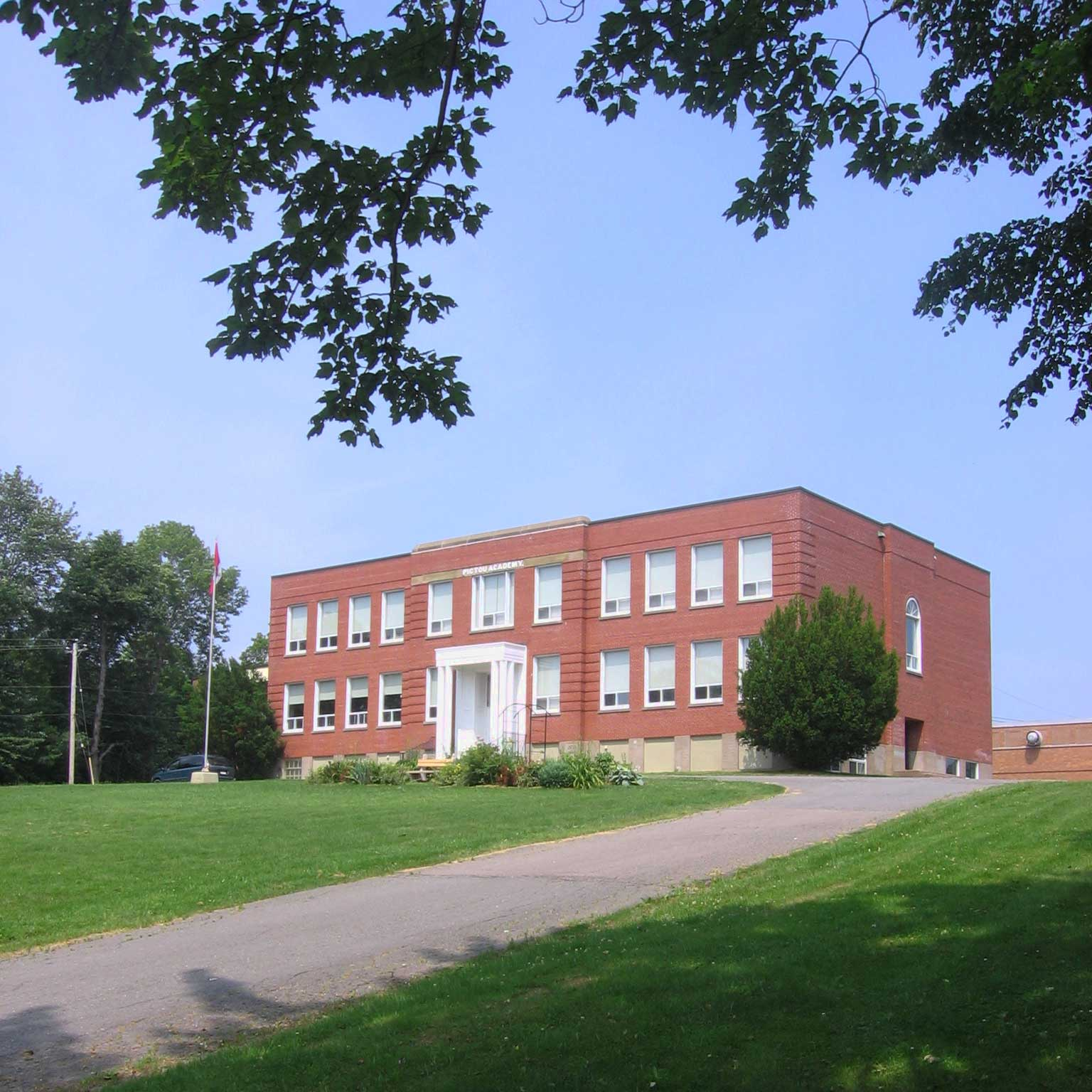
Pictou Academy

In 1808, Thomas McCulloch (1776 – 1843), the academy's founder and first principal (1816 – 1837), established a grammar school at Pictou in his home. The school quickly outgrew the home, as it became popular with families outside of Pictou, attracting students from neighbouring PEI and Cape Breton Island, as well as from British colonies in the Caribbean Islands. This led to its expansion, and a separate log building was constructed as the school building. The school was granted government funding only in 1811; prior to this, its operation relied on subscriptions from local residents. In 1814, with an student body of 30–40 students, the log building was destroyed by fire. McCulloch then turned to the lieutenant governor in Halifax, who provided £100 to rebuild.

In 1815, McCulloch formally established the Pictou Academy, which "on 25 March 1816 the House passed an 'Act for founding, establishing and maintaining an Academy at Pictou'" in Nova Scotia, receiving royal assent. This act provided for the initial financial viability of the academy. In 1831, Pictou Academy became the second degree-granting institution in the British North American colonies.

McCulloch was a Presbyterian minister ordained in the Secessionist church in Scotland. He arrived in Pictou in 1803 and by 1806, he had written about the need for a college because King's, the only degree-granting college in Nova Scotia at that time, was open to only 20% of the population, due to its Anglican and Oxfordian precepts. McCulloch wanted a nonsectarian college that would train local ministers and offer to all a liberal scientific curriculum modelled on the University of Glasgow.

At Pictou, McCulloch began to build up its library and collected insect and bird specimens for a natural history museum. This collection was so extensive that John James Audubon, in a visit in 1833, called it "The finest private collection in North America."

Throughout his years as principal, McCulloch had a constant struggle with government funding, trustees, the status of the academy, and religious groups, both in Pictou and the province. For many years, the Legislative Assembly approved a grant for the academy but the Council rejected or reduced the grant. McCulloch fought vigorously for his ideas, but by 1837, he was in a very difficult position and left the academy to become the first principal of the new Dalhousie College in Halifax. McCulloch remained at Pictou for 35 years.

The academy went through several phases. To 1831 it was a college but after this, a grammar school was added to the college. By 1842, the school had female students and had its college status taken away making it a grammar school only. The school's enrollment ranged widely over the years but by the 1870s, with the changes in school policies in Nova Scotia, the academy was flourishing and became a model secondary institution with excellent facilities and higher grants. Students passed exams to enter the academy which was free to county students. From the beginning, the plan was to keep fees low, and some students did attend for free during the early years.

The emphasis on an academic curriculum with competition and examinations led to Pictou Academy students taking a larger proportion of prizes and bursaries than any other academy in the province. By 1885 it was the largest secondary school in Nova Scotia with students coming from across the province as well as from other countries. As a result, the academy has a long list of famous graduates in all walks of life.

Many gifts and prizes were left to Pictou Academy by its students and others and in 1916, the centenary committee took on a role of continuing support. In 1919, the committee incorporated itself into the PA Augmentation Fund. Later on, it became The Pictou Academy Educational Foundation.

The first building was constructed in 1818 and was used until 1879. A second, larger building opened in 1880 but burned in 1895. The third building also burned and Pictou Academy's current building opened in 1940.

Not only was Pictou Academy an important educational institution, but "Over it was fought the battle of the nineteenth century against unconstitutional government and religious intolerance. It was largely over the rights and wrongs of the Academy more than any other question that the fight was waged and won for responsible government in Nova Scotia." (MacPhie, 1914, p. 135)

== Traditions ==
- The Breakup: One of Pictou Academy's oldest traditions is The Breakup. It is essentially a prom, but is rarely referred to as such; instead, students use the traditional title of Breakup. It's a time when all the graduates come together for their final dance as a class. Although other grade levels (nine, ten and eleven) are allowed to attend, the night is designed for the graduates.
- The Grand March: Closely tied to The Breakup is The Grand March. All of those couples who will be attending The Breakup arrive in the late afternoon, early evening and line up outside the school . They all move down the walkway arm in arm down the driveway and up the pathway through the lawn and eventually into the school. It's a large event, drawing quite a crowd every year.

== Sports ==
Some of the students at Pictou Academy are sports enthusiasts. The school has been known to produce a variety of sport teams who have competed up to the provincial level. Some years the school has over twenty different teams with some funding provided by the school. Among the sports regularly available are:

- Badminton
- Baseball
- Basketball
- Cross-country
- Dragon boat
- Golf
- Hockey
- Rugby
- Soccer
- Softball
- Table tennis
- Track and field

The Pictou Academy sports teams had a successful year in 2010–2011, making it to provincials in golf, basketball, hockey and softball. In the 2012-2013 year, the Senior Girls Basketball team reached the Division 3 provincials for the first time in seven years.

== Notable graduates ==
- Ada Brownrigg received the first Arts degree awarded to a woman in Canada
- Alexander Cameron (1834-1917), medical doctor and politician in Quebec
- Sir John William Dawson was a notable geologist and educator
- Frank Parker Day sportsman, soldier, naturalist, and was a well-known Canadian author and English Professor. He became the academy's first Rhodes Scholar
- John Geddie (missionary)
- Dr Donald L. Grant was a Health Evaluation Division director at Health Canada, and an advisor to the World Health Organization.
- Dr Katharine Joane Mackay (d. 1925) (married name MacKenzie) was second woman to graduate from Dalhousie medical school(1895) and the first woman graduate of Pictou Academy to do so.
- Reverend John Norman Maclean, born in Pictou in 1862; later attended Dalhousie University, the University of Manitoba and the San Francisco Theological Seminary; father of celebrated author Norman Fitzroy Maclean (A River Runs Through It, Young Men and Fire)
- George Monro (1812-1896), born in West River, Nova Scotia. Died in Pine Hill, New York, USA. Publisher and Philanthropist. Known for publishing Seaside Library, a weekly journal covering history, biography, travel and religious works. Munro made substantial gifts to Dalhousie University, starting at a time when there was talk of Dalhousie closing due to financial challenges. Over the course of his life Munro established Chairs in a variety of departments and totaled donations of $500,000. Dalhousie annually celebrates "Monro Day" on the first Friday of February.
- Rear Admiral Leonard Murray was Canada's most important commander during the Battle of the Atlantic
- Dr M. Clara Olding (1869-1921) (married name Hebb) was third woman to graduate from Dalhousie medical school (1896) and the second woman graduate of Pictou Academy to do so.
- Charles B. Patterson, author and leader of the Canadian therapeutic movement.
- Sir W. J. Ritchie later became Chief Justice of the Supreme Court of Canada
- James McGregor Stewart, prominent corporate lawyer, coal administrator during the Second World War, and founder of the Halifax law firm, Stewart McKelvey.
- Jeremy MacKenzie, founder of the alt-right organization Diagolon

== See also ==
- Harris, Robin S. (1976). A History of Higher Education in Canada, 1663-1960. Toronto: University of Toronto Press.
- McCulloch, Thomas (1821-1823). Letters of Mephibosheth Stepsure (Stepsure Letters)
- List of National Historic Sites of Canada in Nova Scotia
- McCulloch, William (1920). Life of Thomas McCulloch, D.D. Truro. p. 7.
- McCulloch, Thomas. (1808). Popery condemned by scripture and the fathers : being a refutation of the principal popish doctrines and assertions maintained in the remarks on the Rev. Mr. Stanser's examination of the Rev. Mr. Burke's letters of instruction ... Edinburgh: J. Pillans and Sons.
- Rev. Thomas McCulloch, D.D., McCulloch Genealogy Centre
- Buggey, Susan; Davies, Gwendolyn (1988). "McCulloch, Thomas". In Halpenny, Francess G. (ed.). Dictionary of Canadian Biography. Vol. VII (1836–1850) (online ed.). University of Toronto Press.
- Wood, B. Anne (1987). "Thomas McCulloch's use of science in promoting a liberal education". Acadiensis. 17 (1): 56–73. ISSN 0044-5851. JSTOR 30302722.
