= Charles Elliott Tanner =

Canadian politician (1857–1946)

The Hon. Charles Elliott Tanner
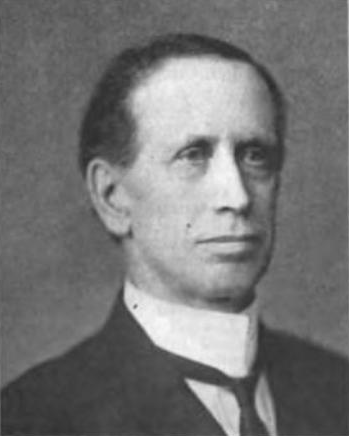

Senator for Pictou, Nova Scotia
- In office 1917–1946
- Appointed by: Robert Borden

Member of the Nova Scotia House of Assembly for Pictou
- In office 1894–1897
- In office 1900–1908
- In office 1911–1916

Nova Scotia Opposition Leader
- In office 1902–1908
- Preceded by: Charles Smith Wilcox
- Succeeded by: Charles Smith Wilcox
- In office 1912–1916
- Preceded by: John M. Baillie
- Succeeded by: William Lorimer Hall

Personal details
- Born: October 7, 1857 Pictou, Nova Scotia
- Died: January 13, 1946 (aged 88)
- Party: Liberal-Conservative
- Other political affiliations: Progressive Conservative Association of Nova Scotia
- Committees: Chair, Special Committee on Development and Improvement of the St. Lawrence River (1928); Chair, Special Committee on Beauharnois Power Project (1932)

Charles Elliott Tanner, KC (October 7, 1857 – January 13, 1946) was a Canadian politician.

Born in Pictou, Nova Scotia, the son of Richard Tanner and Janet Brown, Tanner was educated in the public schools of Pictou and Pictou Academy before being called to the bar and practicing law. He was created a King's Counsel in 1889. He was first elected to the Nova Scotia House of Assembly in 1894 and was defeated in 1897. A Conservative, he was re-elected in a 1900 by-election and again in 1901, 1906 and 1911. He resigned in 1908 to contest the 1908 federal election for the electoral district of Pictou and was defeated. From 1902 to 1908 and from 1912 to 1916, he was the Leader of the Opposition. From 1909 to 1916, he was the Leader of the Conservative Party. He was summoned to the Senate of Canada representing the senatorial division of Pictou on the advice of Robert Borden in 1917. He served until his death in 1946.
