= Josiah H. MacQuarrie =

Canadian politician

Josiah H. MacQuarrie (November 12, 1897 – April 7, 1971) was a lawyer, judge and political figure in Nova Scotia, Canada. He represented Pictou County in the Nova Scotia House of Assembly from 1933 to 1947 as a Liberal member.

He was born in Westville, Nova Scotia, the son of James MacQuarrie and Agnes MacWhinney. MacQuarrie was educated at Pictou Academy, Acadia University and Dalhousie University. In 1921, he married Mattie Atkinson. MacQuarrie ran unsuccessfully for a seat in the House of Commons in 1930. He served in the province's Executive Council as Attorney General from 1933 to 1947 and Minister of Lands and Forests and Municipal Affairs from 1938 to 1947. MacQuarrie was named to the Supreme Court of Nova Scotia in 1947, serving until 1968. He died in Halifax.
