= 1878 Nova Scotia general election =

Canadian provincial election

- September 17, 1878

38 seats of the Nova Scotia House of Assembly 20 seats needed for a majority
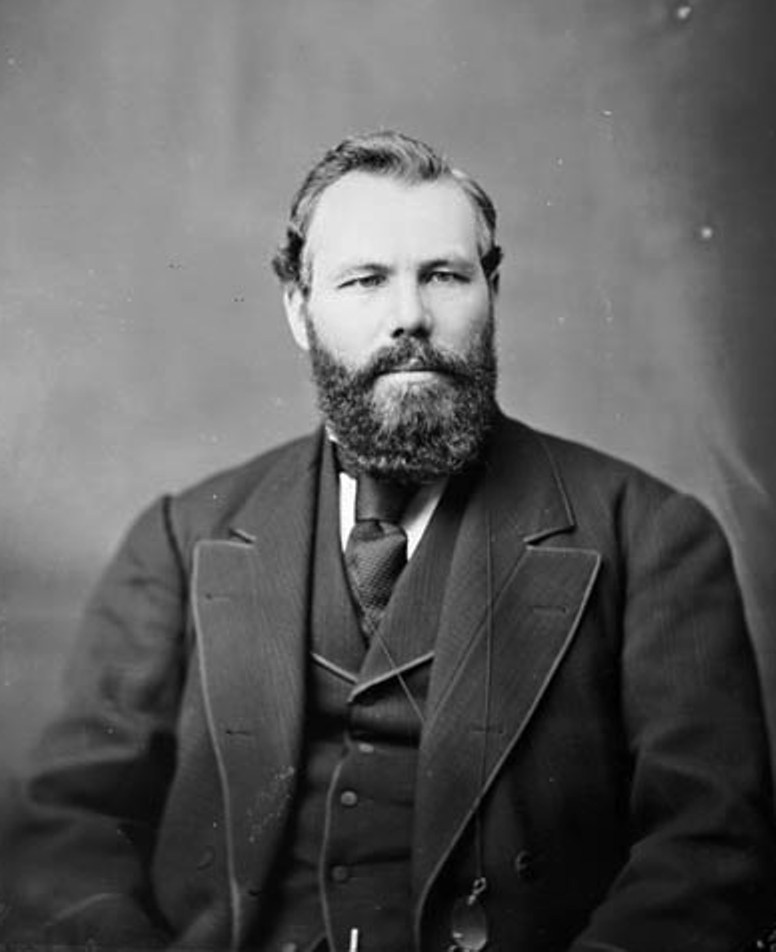
	First party	Second party
		Lib
Leader	Simon Hugh Holmes	Philip Carteret Hill
Party	Liberal-Conservative	Liberal
Leader since	1874	1875
Leader's seat	Pictou	Halifax (Lost re-election)
Last election	11	20
Seats won	30	8
Seat change	▲19	▼12
Popular vote	52,517	47,388
Percentage	51.85%	46.78%
Swing	▲18.18pp	▼7.61pp
Premier before election
Philip Carteret Hill
Liberal
Premier after election
Simon Hugh Holmes
Liberal-Conservative

The 1878 Nova Scotia general election was held on 17 September 1878 to elect members of the 27th House of Assembly of the province of Nova Scotia, Canada. It was won by the Liberal-Conservative Party.

== Results ==
=== Results by party ===
↓
30	8
Liberal-Conservative	Liberal

Official results
Party	Party leader	# of candidates	Seats				Popular vote		
Party	Party leader	# of candidates	1874	Dissolution	Elected	Change	#	%	Change (pp)
Liberal-Conservative	Simon Hugh Holmes	38	11	13	30	+19	52,517	51.85%	+18.18%
Liberal	Philip Carteret Hill	41	20	17	8	-12	47,388	46.78%	-7.61%
Independent/Other		3	7	7	0	-7	1,388	1.37%	-10.57%
Vacant				1					
Total valid votes							101,293	100.00%	–
Blank and invalid ballots							0	0.00%	–
Total		82	38	38	38	–	101,293	100.00%	–

Popular vote
Liberal-Conservative	51.85%
Liberal	46.78%
Independent/Other	1.37%

Seats summary
Liberal-Conservative	78.95%
Liberal	21.05%

== Retiring incumbents ==
Independent/Other

- Hiram Black, Cumberland
- Charles Boudroit, Richmond
- John J. McKinnon, Inverness
- John B. North, Kings

Liberal

- Charles Henry Davison, Lunenburg
- Edward Farrell, Halifax
- Charles M. Franchville, Guysborough
- John A. Fraser, Victoria
- Thomas Johnston, Shelburne
- John Lovitt, Yarmouth
- Daniel MacDonald, Antigonish
- David McCurdy, Victoria

Liberal-Conservative

- William Henry Allison, Hants
- Hugh J. Cameron, Pictou
- Avard Longley, Annapolis
- Murdoch McRae, Richmond
- Alfred Putnam, Hants
- Douglas Benjamin Woodworth, Kings

== Nominated candidates ==
1878 Nova Scotia Provincial Election

Legend
bold denotes party leader
† denotes an incumbent who is not running for re-election or was defeated in nomination contest

=== Valley ===
Electoral district	Candidates			Incumbent
Electoral district	Liberal	Liberal-Conservative	Independent/Other	Incumbent
Annapolis	O. M. Taylor; 1,235; 24.49%	William Botsford Troop; 1,350; 26.77%		William Botsford Troop
Annapolis	E. Bent; 1,163; 23.06%	Caleb Shaffner; 1,295; 25.68%		Avard Longley†
Digby	Urbine Doucette; 738; 20.20%	Benjamin Van Blarcom; 833; 22.80%	Colin Campbell; 725; 19.85%	Colin Campbell
Digby	John S. McNeill; 527; 14.43%	Benjamin Van Blarcom; 833; 22.80%	Colin Campbell; 725; 19.85%	Colin Campbell
Digby	Henri M. Robicheau; 830; 22.72%			Henri M. Robicheau
Hants	Thomas Barlow Smith; 1,507; 25.58%	F. S. Creelman; 1,465; 24.87%		William Henry Allison†
Hants	William Dawson Laurence; 1,298; 22.03%	Nathaniel Spence; 1,621; 27.52%		Alfred Putnam†
Kings	G. W. Fisher; 1,414; 24.87%	William C. Bill; 1,601; 28.16%		Douglas Benjamin Woodworth†
Kings	E. A. Forsyth; 1,143; 20.11%	James S. MacDonald; 1,527; 26.86%		John B. North†

=== South Shore ===
Electoral district	Candidates			Incumbent
Electoral district	Liberal	Liberal-Conservative	Independent/Other	Incumbent
Lunenburg	James Daniel Eisenhauer; 1,263; 21.98%	Charles A. Smith; 1,719; 29.91%		James Daniel Eisenhauer
Lunenburg	F. B. Wade; 1,286; 22.38%	Edward James; 1,479; 25.74%		Charles Henry Davison†
Queens	Samuel Freeman; 531; 21.33%	Leander Ford; 607; 24.38%		Samuel Freeman
Queens	Jason M. Mack; 503; 20.20%	James C. Bartling; 534; 21.45%		Jason M. Mack
Queens	Albert M. Hemeon; 315; 12.65%	James C. Bartling; 534; 21.45%		Jason M. Mack
Shelburne	William F. MacCoy; 892; 22.92%	Nathaniel Whitworth White; 1,140; 29.29%		Nathaniel Whitworth White
Shelburne	M. Nickerson; 871; 22.38%	Nehemiah McGray; 989; 25.41%		Thomas Johnston†
Yarmouth	Albert Gayton; 1,086; 29.22%		W. V. Brown; 470; 12.65%	Albert Gayton
Yarmouth	Joseph Robbins Kinney; 1,000; 26.91%	Bowman Corning; 669; 18.%		John Lovitt†
Yarmouth	A. S. Lent; 491; 13.21%	Bowman Corning; 669; 18.%		John Lovitt†

=== Fundy-Northeast ===
Electoral district	Candidates			Incumbent
Electoral district	Liberal	Liberal-Conservative	Independent/Other	Incumbent
Colchester	C. N. Cummings; 1,402; 21.77%	William Albert Patterson; 1,846; 28.66%		William Albert Patterson
Colchester	Fred Tupper; 1,308; 20.31%	William Blair; 1,885; 29.27%		Vacant
Cumberland	William Oxley; 1,657; 25.78%	Charles James Townshend; 1,792; 27.88%		Hiram Black†
Cumberland	C. Lewis; 1,311; 20.40%	Edward Vickery; 1,667; 25.94%		Edward Vickery

=== Halifax ===
Electoral district	Candidates			Incumbent
Electoral district	Liberal	Liberal-Conservative	Independent/Other	Incumbent
Halifax	**Philip Carteret Hill**; 2,866; 15.76%	Charles James MacDonald; 3,375; 18.55%		Philip Carteret Hill
Halifax	Donald Archibald; 2,722; 14.96%	William D. Harrington; 3,353; 18.43%		Donald Archibald
Halifax	Michael Joseph Power; 2,739; 15.06%	John Pugh; 3,135; 17.23%		Edward Farrell†

=== Central Nova ===
Electoral district	Candidates			Incumbent
Electoral district	Liberal	Liberal-Conservative	Independent/Other	Incumbent
Antigonish		John Sparrow David Thompson; Acclamation		John Sparrow David Thompson
Antigonish	Angus McGillivray; Acclamation			Daniel MacDonald†
Guysborough	D. C. Fraser; 596; 19.22%	Joseph William Hadley; 803; 25.89%		Charles M. Franchville†
Guysborough	Otto Schwartz Weeks; 502; 16.19%	Alexander N. McDonald; 698; 22.51%		Otto Schwartz Weeks
Guysborough	H. R. Cunningham; 502; 16.19%	Alexander N. McDonald; 698; 22.51%		Otto Schwartz Weeks
Pictou	George Murray; 2,349; 15.85%	**Simon Hugh Holmes**; 2,752; 18.57%		Simon Hugh Holmes
Pictou	John D. McLeod; 2,250; 15.18%	Adam Carr Bell; 2,694; 18.18%		Hugh J. Cameron†
Pictou	Robert McNeil; 2,183; 14.73%	Alexander MacKay; 2,592; 17.49%		Alexander MacKay

=== Cape Breton ===
Electoral district	Candidates			Incumbent
Electoral district	Liberal	Liberal-Conservative	Independent/Other	Incumbent
Cape Breton	Alonzo J. White; 930; 16.82%	Hector Francis McDougall; 1,027; 18.57%		Alonzo J. White
Cape Breton	Alonzo J. White; 930; 16.82%	J. H. Hearn; 716; 12.95%		Alonzo J. White
Cape Breton	Alonzo J. White; 930; 16.82%	Joseph McVarish; 371; 6.71%		Alonzo J. White
Cape Breton	D. McKenzie; 614; 11.10%	Ebenezer Tilton Moseley; 1,523; 27.54%		Ebenezer Tilton Moseley
Cape Breton	D. McKenzie; 614; 11.10%	Michael McKinnon; 349; 6.31%		Ebenezer Tilton Moseley
Inverness	Duncan J. Campbell; 1,650; 27.36%	D. Gillies; 1,393; 23.10%		Duncan J. Campbell
Inverness	John McKinnon; 1,440; 23.88%	Alexander Campbell; 1,548; 25.67%		John J. McKinnon†
Richmond	Isidore LeBlanc; 599; 26.11%	Edward Gagnon; 551; 24.02%		Charles Boudroit†
Richmond	Joseph Matheson; 501; 21.84%	Alexander McCuish; 643; 28.03%		Murdoch McRae†
Victoria	William F. McCurdy; 594; 25.36%	J. S. McLean; 368; 15.71%	William Kidston; 193; 8.24%	David McCurdy†
Victoria	John Ross; 580; 24.77%	John Angus Morrison; 607; 25.92%		John A. Fraser†
