= 1882 Nova Scotia general election =

Canadian provincial election

- June 20, 1882

38 seats of the Nova Scotia House of Assembly 20 seats needed for a majority
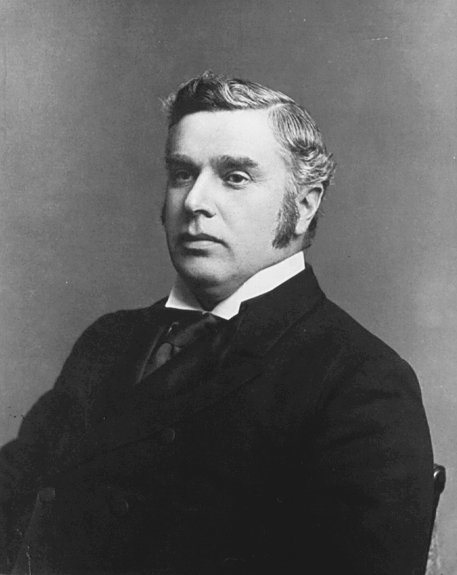
	First party	Second party
	Lib
Leader	None	John Sparrow David Thompson
Party	Liberal	Liberal-Conservative
Leader since		1882
Leader's seat		Antigonish
Last election	8	30
Seats won	24	14
Seat change	▲16	▼16
Popular vote	50,206	45,779
Percentage	51.74%	47.18%
Swing	▲4.96pp	▼4.67pp
Premier before election
John Sparrow David Thompson
Liberal-Conservative
Premier after election
William Thomas Pipes
Liberal

The 1882 Nova Scotia general election was held on 20 June 1882 to elect members of the 28th House of Assembly of the province of Nova Scotia, Canada. It was won by the Liberal Party, their first of ten consecutive wins that would see them retain power until 1925. The Conservatives were the only one-term government in Nova Scotia until 2013 when the NDP lost.

The Liberals did not have a formal leader at the time of the election. After their victory, the newly elected caucus selected William Thomas Pipes to be Premier.

== Results ==
=== Results by party ===
↓
24	14
Liberal	Liberal-Conservative

Official results
Party	Party leader	# of candidates	Seats				Popular vote		
Party	Party leader	# of candidates	1878	Dissolution	Elected	Change	#	%	Change (pp)
Liberal	None	38	8	8	24	+16	50,206	51.74%	+4.96%
Liberal-Conservative	John Sparrow David Thompson	37	30	29	14	-16	45,779	47.18%	-4.67%
Independent/Other		4	0	0	0	0	1,043	1.08%	-0.29%
Vacant				1					
Total valid votes							97,028	100.00%	–
Blank and invalid ballots							0	0.00%	–
Total		79	38	38	38	–	97,028	100.00%	–

Popular vote
Liberal	51.74%
Liberal-Conservative	47.18%
Independent/Other	1.08%

Seats summary
Liberal	63.16%
Liberal-Conservative	36.84%

== Retiring incumbents ==
Liberal

- Joseph Robbins Kinney, Yarmouth
- Thomas Barlow Smith, Hants

Liberal-Conservative

- Benjamin Van Blarcom, Digby
- Simon Hugh Holmes, Pictou
- Edward James, Lunenburg
- James S. MacDonald, Kings
- Hector Francis McDougall, Cape Breton
- John Fitzwilliam Stairs, Halifax
- Nathaniel Whitworth White, Shelburne

== Nominated candidates ==
1882 Nova Scotia Provincial Election

Legend
bold denotes party leader
† denotes an incumbent who is not running for re-election or was defeated in nomination contest

=== Valley ===
Electoral district	Candidates			Incumbent
Electoral district	Liberal-Conservative	Liberal	Independent/Other	Incumbent
Annapolis	William Botsford Troop; 1,212; 23.57%	James Wilberforce Longley; 1,340; 26.06%		William Botsford Troop
Annapolis	Caleb Shaffner; 1,261; 24.52%	Henry M. Munro; 1,329; 25.85%		Caleb Shaffner
Digby	George Taylor; 752; 21.23%	Henri M. Robicheau; 1,048; 29.59%	William Lent; 92; 2.60%	Henri M. Robicheau
Digby	Urbine Doucette; 664; 18.75%	John S. McNeill; 986; 27.84%		Benjamin Van Blarcom†
Hants	Nathaniel Spence; 1,236; 25.05%	Archibald Frame; 1,209; 24.50%		Nathaniel Spence
Hants	F. S. Creelman; 1,229; 24.90%	Allen Haley; 1,261; 25.55%		Thomas Barlow Smith†
Kings	Thomas R. Harris; 1,345; 24.17%	C. B. Hickey; 1,198; 21.53%	James Lyons; 318; 5.71%	James S. MacDonald†
Kings	William C. Bill; 1,267; 22.77%	Thomas Lewis Dodge; 1,437; 25.82%		William C. Bill

=== South Shore ===
Electoral district	Candidates			Incumbent
Electoral district	Liberal-Conservative	Liberal	Independent/Other	Incumbent
Lunenburg	Charles A. Smith; 1,195; 22.78%	Charles Edward Church; 1,539; 29.34%		Charles A. Smith
Lunenburg	W. R. Calder; 1,075; 20.50%	George A. Ross; 1,436; 27.38%		Edward James†
Queens	Leander Ford; 548; 22.50%	Joseph H. Cook; 689; 28.28%		Leander Ford
Queens	James C. Bartling; 555; 22.78%	Jason M. Mack; 644; 26.44%		James C. Bartling
Shelburne	John Allan; 547; 17.51%	Thomas Johnston; 947; 30.31%		Nathaniel Whitworth White†
Shelburne	Nehemiah McGray; 692; 22.15%	William F. MacCoy; 938; 30.03%		Nehemiah McGray
Yarmouth		Albert Gayton; 1,344; 39.26%		Albert Gayton
Yarmouth	Thomas Corning; 1,203; 35.14%	T. B. Flint; 876; 25.59%		Joseph Robbins Kinney†

=== Fundy-Northeast ===
Electoral district	Candidates			Incumbent
Electoral district	Liberal-Conservative	Liberal	Independent/Other	Incumbent
Colchester	William Blair; 1,507; 24.64%	S. D. McLellan; 1,387; 22.68%	Samuel Rettie; 474; 7.75%	William Blair
Colchester	William Albert Patterson; 1,497; 24.48%	W. H. Guild; 1,251; 20.45%		William Albert Patterson
Cumberland	Charles James Townshend; 1,690; 24.98%	Charles Smith; 1,682; 24.86%		Charles James Townshend
Cumberland	Edward Vickery; 1,519; 22.45%	William Thomas Pipes; 1,875; 27.71%		Edward Vickery

=== Halifax ===
Electoral district	Candidates			Incumbent
Electoral district	Liberal-Conservative	Liberal	Independent/Other	Incumbent
Halifax	J. F. L. Parsons; 2,475; 16.06%	Michael Joseph Power; 2,591; 16.82%		John Fitzwilliam Stairs†
Halifax	William D. Harrington; 2,737; 17.76%	J. G. Foster; 2,543; 16.50%		William D. Harrington
Halifax	John Pugh; 2,508; 16.28%	William Stevens Fielding; 2,554; 16.58%		John Pugh

=== Central Nova ===
Electoral district	Candidates			Incumbent
Electoral district	Liberal-Conservative	Liberal	Independent/Other	Incumbent
Antigonish	**John Sparrow David Thompson**; 1,166; 41.60%	Joseph McDonald; 543; 19.37%		John Sparrow David Thompson
Antigonish		Angus McGillivray; 1,094; 39.03%		Angus McGillivray
Guysborough	Alexander N. McDonald; 518; 19.81%	Otto Schwartz Weeks; 871; 33.31%		Alexander N. McDonald
Guysborough	Joseph William Hadley; 414; 15.83%	John A. Fraser; 812; 31.05%		Joseph William Hadley
Pictou	Robert Hockin; 2,492; 17.41%	Jeffrey McColl; 2,411; 16.84%		Simon Hugh Holmes†
Pictou	Charles H. Munro; 2,489; 17.39%	Edward Mortimer MacDonald; 2,250; 15.72%		Vacant
Pictou	Adam Carr Bell; 2,473; 17.28%	Cornelius Dwyer; 2,200; 15.37%		Adam Carr Bell

=== Cape Breton ===
Electoral district	Candidates			Incumbent
Electoral district	Liberal-Conservative	Liberal	Independent/Other	Incumbent
Cape Breton	Ebenezer Tilton Moseley; 1,192; 21.48%	Alonzo J. White; 1,600; 28.83%		Ebenezer Tilton Moseley
Cape Breton	Colin Chisholm; 1,178; 21.23%	William Buchanan; 1,579; 28.46%		Hector Francis McDougall†
Inverness	Angus MacLennan; 1,387; 24.70%	Duncan J. Campbell; 1,435; 25.55%		Duncan J. Campbell
Inverness	Alexander Campbell; 1,477; 26.30%	John McKinnon; 1,317; 23.45%		Alexander Campbell
Richmond	Neil L. McNeil; 150; 8.45%	Isidore LeBlanc; 538; 30.31%		Isidore LeBlanc
Richmond	Murdoch McRae; 407; 22.93%	Joseph Matheson; 354; 19.94%		Alexander McCuish
Richmond	Alexander McCuish; 326; 18.37%	Joseph Matheson; 354; 19.94%		Alexander McCuish
Victoria	John Archibald McDonald; 874; 32.94%	D.J. McLeod; 498; 18.77%	John Munroe; 159; 5.99%	John Morrison
Victoria	John Morrison; 522; 19.68%	William F. McCurdy; 600; 22.62%		William F. McCurdy
