= 1886 Nova Scotia general election =

Canadian provincial election

- June 8–15, 1886

38 seats of the Nova Scotia House of Assembly 20 seats needed for a majority
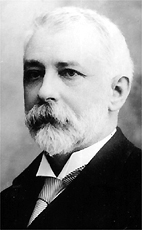
	First party	Second party
		Con
Leader	William Stevens Fielding	Adam Carr Bell
Party	Liberal	Liberal-Conservative
Leader since	1884	1882
Leader's seat	Halifax	Pictou
Last election	24	14
Seats won	29	8
Seat change	▲5	▼6
Popular vote	62,361	50,149
Percentage	54.88%	44.13%
Swing	▲3.14pp	▼3.05pp
Premier before election
William Stevens Fielding
Liberal
Premier after election
William Stevens Fielding
Liberal

The 1886 Nova Scotia general election was held from 8 June to 15 June 1886 to elect members of the 29th House of Assembly of the province of Nova Scotia, Canada. It was won by the Liberal party.

== Results ==
=== Results by party ===
↓
29	8	1
Liberal	Liberal-Conservative	Independent

Official results
Party	Party leader	# of candidates	Seats				Popular vote		
Party	Party leader	# of candidates	1882	Dissolution	Elected	Change	#	%	Change (pp)
Liberal	William Stevens Fielding	39	24	24	29	+5	62,361	54.88%	+3.14%
Liberal-Conservative	Adam Carr Bell	37	14	14	8	-6	50,149	44.13%	-3.05%
Independent/Other		2	0	0	1	+1	1,120	0.99%	-0.09%
Vacant				0					
Total valid votes							113,630	100.00%	–
Blank and invalid ballots							0	0.00%	–
Total		78	38	38	38	–	113,630	100.00%	–

Popular vote
Liberal	54.88%
Liberal-Conservative	44.13%
Independent/Other	0.99%

Seats summary
Liberal	76.32%
Liberal-Conservative	21.05%
Independent/Other	2.63%

== Retiring incumbents ==
Liberal

- William Buchanan, Cape Breton
- Thomas Lewis Dodge, Kings
- Isidore LeBlanc, Richmond
- William F. McCurdy, Victoria
- William Thomas Pipes, Cumberland
- Alonzo J. White, Cape Breton

Liberal-Conservative

- William Blair, Colchester
- John Archibald McDonald, Victoria

== Nominated candidates ==
1886 Nova Scotia Provincial Election

Legend
bold denotes party leader
† denotes an incumbent who is not running for re-election or was defeated in nomination contest

=== Valley ===
Electoral district	Candidates			Incumbent
Electoral district	Liberal	Liberal-Conservative	Independent/Other	Incumbent
Annapolis	James Wilberforce Longley; 1,556; 25.25%	R. J. Ellison; 1,531; 24.85%		James Wilberforce Longley
Annapolis	Henry M. Munro; 1,535; 24.91%	Frank Andrews; 1,540; 24.99%		Henry M. Munro
Digby	Henri M. Robicheau; 1,108; 42.35%	Robert G. Munroe; 522; 19.95%		Henri M. Robicheau
Digby	John S. McNeill; 986; 37.69%			John S. McNeill
Hants	Allen Haley; 1,552; 25.50%	Allan MacDougall; 1,508; 24.77%		Allen Haley
Hants	Archibald Frame; 1,522; 25.00%	Nathaniel Spence; 1,505; 24.72%		Nathaniel Spence
Kings	Alfred P. Welton; 1,535; 24.92%	William C. Bill; 1,560; 25.32%		Thomas Lewis Dodge†
Kings	Leander Rand; 1,635; 26.54%	Thomas R. Harris; 1,430; 23.21%		Thomas R. Harris

=== South Shore ===
Electoral district	Candidates			Incumbent
Electoral district	Liberal	Liberal-Conservative	Independent/Other	Incumbent
Lunenburg	Charles Edward Church; 1,924; 29.13%	Charles A. Smith; 1,475; 22.33%		Charles Edward Church
Lunenburg	George A. Ross; 1,798; 27.22%	Aubrey B. Caldwell; 1,408; 21.32%		George A. Ross
Queens	Jason M. Mack; 787; 29.25%	Leander Ford; 622; 23.11%		Jason M. Mack
Queens	Joseph H. Cook; 762; 28.32%	James C. Bartling; 520; 19.32%		Joseph H. Cook
Shelburne	Thomas Johnston; 1,188; 30.97%	Alfred K. Smith; 860; 22.42%		Thomas Johnston
Shelburne	William F. MacCoy; 1,063; 27.71%	Charles Cahan; 725; 18.90%		William F. MacCoy
Yarmouth	Albert Gayton; 1,643; 39.43%			Albert Gayton
Yarmouth	William Law; 1,745; 41.88%	Thomas Corning; 779; 18.69%		Thomas Corning

=== Fundy-Northeast ===
Electoral district	Candidates			Incumbent
Electoral district	Liberal	Liberal-Conservative	Independent/Other	Incumbent
Colchester	George Clarke; 2,053; 27.47%	S. E. Gourley; 1,700; 22.75%		William Blair†
Colchester	Frederick Andrew Laurence; 1,938; 25.93%	William Albert Patterson; 1,782; 23.85%		William Albert Patterson
Cumberland	Thomas Reuben Black; 2,083; 25.15%	C. J. Macfarlane; 1,855; 22.40%	James B. Wilson; 341; 4.12%	Thomas Reuben Black
Cumberland	George W. Forrest; 1,939; 23.41%	Richard L. Black; 2,064; 24.92%		William Thomas Pipes†

=== Halifax ===
Electoral district	Candidates			Incumbent
Electoral district	Liberal	Liberal-Conservative	Independent/Other	Incumbent
Halifax	**William Stevens Fielding**; 4,042; 19.76%	John Y. Payzant; 2,816; 13.76%		William Stevens Fielding
Halifax	Michael Joseph Power; 3,822; 18.68%	J. N. Lyons; 2,866; 14.01%		Michael Joseph Power
Halifax	William Roche; 3,931; 19.21%	William D. Harrington; 2,981; 14.57%		William D. Harrington

=== Central Nova ===
Electoral district	Candidates			Incumbent
Electoral district	Liberal	Liberal-Conservative	Independent/Other	Incumbent
Antigonish	Angus McGillivray; 1,384; 34.30%	Rod K. McDonald; 482; 11.95%		Angus McGillivray
Antigonish	Colin Francis McIsaac; 1,269; 31.45%	Charles B. Whidden; 900; 22.30%		Charles B. Whidden
Guysborough	James A. Fraser; 1,036; 33.67%	Joseph William Hadley; 565; 18.36%		John A. Fraser
Guysborough	Otto Schwartz Weeks; 931; 30.26%	J. F. L. Parsons; 545; 17.71%		Otto Schwartz Weeks
Pictou	Jeffrey McColl; 2,606; 16.70%	Robert Hockin; 2,565; 16.44%		Robert Hockin
Pictou	John D. McLeod; 2,514; 16.11%	Charles H. Munro; 2,578; 16.52%		Charles H. Munro
Pictou	Robert Drummond; 2,498; 16.01%	**Adam Carr Bell**; 2,844; 18.22%		Adam Carr Bell

=== Cape Breton ===
Electoral district	Candidates			Incumbent
Electoral district	Liberal	Liberal-Conservative	Independent/Other	Incumbent
Cape Breton	George Henry Murray; 1,253; 24.13%	Colin Chisholm; 1,633; 31.44%		Alonzo J. White†
Cape Breton	Ronald Gillies; 745; 14.35%	William MacKay; 1,562; 30.08%		William Buchanan†
Inverness	John McKinnon; 1,854; 31.13%	Angus MacLennan; 1,363; 22.89%		Angus MacLennan
Inverness	Daniel McNeil; 1,764; 29.62%	Alexander Campbell; 974; 16.36%		Alexander Campbell
Richmond	Angus S. McLean; 455; 19.65%	David A. Hearn; 534; 23.07%		Isidore LeBlanc†
Richmond	Joseph Matheson; 616; 26.61%	Murdoch McRae; 316; 13.65%		Murdoch McRae
Richmond	Charles LeNoir; 394; 17.02%	Murdoch McRae; 316; 13.65%		Murdoch McRae
Victoria	John J. McCabe; 385; 13.21%	Murdoch G. McLeod; 463; 15.89%	John Lemuel Bethune; 779; 26.74%	John Archibald McDonald†
Victoria	John A. Fraser; 510; 17.51%	John Morrison; 408; 14.01%		William F. McCurdy†
Victoria	John A. Fraser; 510; 17.51%	John Munroe; 368; 12.63%		William F. McCurdy†
