= 27th General Assembly of Nova Scotia =

The 27th General Assembly of Nova Scotia represented Nova Scotia between 1878 and 1882.

E.T. Moseley was chosen as speaker for the house.

The assembly was dissolved on May 23, 1882.

== List of Members ==
Electoral District	Name	Party	First elected / previously elected
Annapolis County	William Botsford Troop	Conservative	1874
Annapolis County	Caleb W. Shaffner	Conservative	1878
Antigonish County	John Sparrow David Thompson	Conservative	1877
Antigonish County	Angus McGillivray	Conservative	1878
County of Cape Breton	Ebenezer T. Moseley	Conservative	1874
County of Cape Breton	Hector F. McDougall	Conservative	1878
Colchester County	William M. Blair	Conservative	1878
Colchester County	William A. Patterson	Conservative	1874
Cumberland County	Charles J. Townshend	Conservative	1878
Cumberland County	Edward S. Vickery	Conservative	1871, 1874
Digby County	Benjamin Van Blarcom	Conservative	1878
Digby County	Henri M. Robicheau	Liberal	1878
Guysborough County	Joseph W. Hadley	Conservative	1878
Guysborough County	Alexander W. McDonald	Conservative	1878
Halifax County	Charles J. MacDonald (Note: resigned)	Conservative	1878
Halifax County	William D. Harrington	Conservative	1878
Halifax County	John Pugh	Conservative	1878
Halifax County	John F. Stairs	Conservative	1879
Hants County	Nathaniel Spence	Conservative	1878
Hants County	Thomas B. Smith	Liberal	1874, 1878
Inverness County	Duncan J. Campbell	Liberal	1872
Inverness County	Alexander Campbell	Conservative	1867, 1878
Kings County	William C. Bill	Conservative	1878
Kings County	James S. McDonald	Conservative	1878
Lunenburg County	Charles A. Smith	Conservative	1878
Lunenburg County	Edward James	Conservative	1878
Pictou County	Simon H. Holmes	Conservative	1871
Pictou County	Adam C. Bell	Conservative	1878
Pictou County	Alexander MacKay	Conservative	1872
Queens County	Leander S. Ford	Conservative	1878
Queens County	James C. Bartling	Conservative	1878
Richmond County	Alexander McCuish	Conservative	1878
Richmond County	Isidore LeBlanc	Liberal	1878
Shelburne County	Nathaniel W. White	Conservative	1878
Shelburne County	Nehemiah McGray	Conservative	1878
Victoria County	John A. Morrison	Conservative	1878
Victoria County	William F. McCurdy	Liberal	1878
Yarmouth County	Albert Gayton	Liberal	1871
Yarmouth County	Joseph R. Kinney	Conservative	1878

== Notes ==
Preceded by 26th General Assembly of Nova Scotia	General Assemblies of Nova Scotia; 1878–1882	Succeeded by 28th General Assembly of Nova Scotia
