= 28th General Assembly of Nova Scotia =

The 28th General Assembly of Nova Scotia represented Nova Scotia between 1882 and 1886.

Angus McGillivray was chosen as speaker for the house.

The assembly was dissolved on May 20, 1886.

== List of Members ==
Electoral District	Name	Party	First elected / previously elected
Annapolis County	J. W. Longley	Liberal	1882
Annapolis County	Henry M. Munro	Liberal	1882
Antigonish County	John S.D. Thompson	Conservative	1877
Antigonish County	Angus McGillivray	Liberal	1878
Antigonish County	Charles B. Whidden (1882)	Conservative	1882
County of Cape Breton	Alonza J. White	Liberal	1867, 1882
County of Cape Breton	William Buchanan	Liberal	1882
Colchester County	William M. Blair	Conservative	1878
Colchester County	William A. Patterson	Conservative	1874
Cumberland County	William T. Pipes	Liberal	1882
Cumberland County	Charles J. Townshend	Conservative	1878
Cumberland County	Thomas Reuben Black (1884)	Liberal	1884
Digby County	Henri M. Robicheau	Liberal	1878
Digby County	John S. McNeill	Liberal	1882
Guysborough County	Otto Schwartz Weeks	Liberal	1875, 1882
Guysborough County	James A. Fraser	Liberal	1882
Halifax County	William D. Harrington	Conservative	1878
Halifax County	Michael Joseph Power	Liberal	1882
Halifax County	William S. Fielding	Liberal	1882
Hants County	Allen Haley	Liberal	1882
Hants County	Nathaniel Spence	Conservative	1878
Inverness County	Alexander Campbell	Conservative	1867, 1878
Inverness County	Duncan J. Campbell	Liberal	1872
Inverness County	Angus MacLennan (1883)	Conservative	1883
Kings County	Thomas L. Dodge	Liberal	1882
Kings County	Thomas R. Harris	Conservative	1882
Lunenburg County	Charles E. Church	Liberal	1882
Lunenburg County	George A. Ross	Liberal	1882
Pictou County	Robert Hockin	Conservative	1882
Pictou County	Charles H. Munro	Conservative	1882
Pictou County	Adam C. Bell	Conservative	1878
Queens County	Jason M. Mack	Liberal	1882
Queens County	Joseph H. Cook	Liberal	1882
Richmond County	Isidore LeBlanc	Liberal	1878
Richmond County	Murdoch McRae	Conservative	1867, 1882
Shelburne County	Thomas Johnston	Liberal	1867, 1882
Shelburne County	William F. McCoy	Liberal	1882
Victoria County	John A. McDonald	Conservative	1882
Victoria County	William F. McCurdy	Liberal	1878
Yarmouth County	Albert Gayton	Liberal	1871
Yarmouth County	Thomas Corning	Conservative	1882

== Notes ==
Preceded by 27th General Assembly of Nova Scotia	General Assemblies of Nova Scotia; 1882–1886	Succeeded by 29th General Assembly of Nova Scotia
