= 26th General Assembly of Nova Scotia =

The 26th General Assembly of Nova Scotia represented Nova Scotia between 1874 and 1878.

John B. Dickie was chosen as speaker for the house in 1875. Mather Byles DesBrisay served as speaker from May 1875 to 1876, when he was named county judge. Isaac N. Mack became speaker in 1877.

The assembly was dissolved on September 21, 1878.

== List of Members ==
Electoral District	Name	Party	First elected / previously elected
Annapolis County	Avard Longley	Conservative	1859, 1874
Annapolis County	William Botsford Troop	Conservative	1874
Antigonish County	John J. McKinnon (Note: resigned)	Independent	1874
Antigonish County	Daniel MacDonald	Liberal	1867
Antigonish County	John Sparrow David Thompson (1877)	Conservative	1877
County of Cape Breton	Alonza J. White	Liberal	1867
County of Cape Breton	Ebenezer T. Moseley	Conservative	1874
Colchester County	William A. Patterson	Conservative	1874
Colchester County	John B. Dickie	Liberal	1874
Cumberland County	Hiram Black	Liberal	1874
Cumberland County	Amos Purdy	Liberal	1867, 1874
Cumberland County	Edward Vickery (1875)	Conservative	1871, 1875
Digby County	Colin Campbell	Independent	1874
Digby County	Henri M. Robicheau	Liberal	1874
Guysborough County	Charles M. Franchville	Liberal	1874
Guysborough County	William H. Wylde	Liberal	1870
Guysborough County	Otto Schwartz Weeks (1875)	Liberal	1875
Halifax County	Philip Carteret Hill	Liberal	1870, 1874
Halifax County	Donald Archibald	Liberal	1871
Halifax County	Edward Farrell	Liberal	1874
Hants County	William Henry Allison	Conservative	1871, 1874
Hants County	Alfred Putnam	Liberal	1874
Inverness County	Duncan J. Campbell	Conservative	1872
Inverness County	John McKinnon	Liberal	1874
Kings County	Douglas B. Woodworth	Conservative	1871
Kings County	John B. North	Independent	1874
Lunenburg County	James Eisenhauer	Liberal	1867
Lunenburg County	Mather Byles DesBrisay (Note: named judge)	Liberal	1867
Lunenburg County	Charles Henry Davison (1876)	Liberal	1876
Pictou County	Hugh J. Cameron	Conservative	1871
Pictou County	Simon H. Holmes	Conservative	1871
Pictou County	Alexander MacKay	Conservative	1872
Queens County	Isaac N. Mack	Liberal	1874
Queens County	Samuel Freeman	Liberal	1867
Richmond County	Charles Boudroit	Independent	1874
Richmond County	Murdoch McRae	Conservative	1871
Shelburne County	Thomas Johnston	Liberal	1867
Shelburne County	Robert Robertson	Liberal	1867
Shelburne County	Nathaniel Whitworth White (1878)	Conservative	1878
Victoria County	David McCurdy	Liberal	1873
Victoria County	John A. Fraser	Liberal	1874
Yarmouth County	Albert Gayton	Liberal	1871
Yarmouth County	John Lovitt	Liberal	1874

== Notes ==
Preceded by 25th General Assembly of Nova Scotia	General Assemblies of Nova Scotia; 1874–1878	Succeeded by 27th General Assembly of Nova Scotia
