= 29th General Assembly of Nova Scotia =

The 29th General Assembly of Nova Scotia represented Nova Scotia between 1886 and 1890.

The Liberal Party led by William Stevens Fielding formed the government.

Michael J. Power was chosen as speaker for the house.

The assembly was dissolved on April 21, 1890.

== List of Members ==
Electoral District	Name	Party	First elected / previously elected
Annapolis County	J. W. Longley	Liberal	1882
Annapolis County	Frank Andrews	Liberal-Conservative	1886
Antigonish County	Angus McGillivray	Liberal	1878
Antigonish County	Colin F. McIsaac	Liberal	1886
County of Cape Breton	Colin Chisholm	Liberal-Conservative	1886
County of Cape Breton	William McKay	Liberal-Conservative	1886
Colchester County	George Clarke	Liberal	1886
Colchester County	Frederick Andrew Laurence	Liberal	1886
Cumberland County	Thomas R. Black	Liberal	1886
Cumberland County	Richard L. Black	Conservative	1886
Digby County	Henri M. Robicheau	Liberal	1878
Digby County	John S. McNeill	Liberal	1882
Guysborough County	James A. Fraser	Liberal	1882
Guysborough County	Otto Schwartz Weeks	Liberal	1875, 1882
Halifax County	William S. Fielding	Liberal	1882
Halifax County	William Roche, Jr.	Liberal-Conservative	1886
Halifax County	Michael Joseph Power	Liberal	1882
Hants County	Allen Haley	Liberal	1882
Hants County	Archibald Frame	Liberal	1886
Inverness County	John McKinnon	Liberal	1874, 1886
Inverness County	Daniel McNeil	Liberal	1886
Kings County	Leander Rand	Liberal	1886
Kings County	William C. Bill	Liberal-Conservative	1878, 1886
Lunenburg County	Charles E. Church	Liberal	1882
Lunenburg County	George A. Ross	Liberal	1882
Lunenburg County	John D. Sperry (1889)	Liberal	1889
Pictou County	Adam C. Bell	Liberal-Conservative	1878
Pictou County	Jeffrey McColl	Liberal	1886
Pictou County	Charles H. Munro	Liberal-Conservative	1882
Pictou County	William Cameron (1887)	Liberal-Conservative	1887
Queens County	Jason M. Mack	Liberal	1882
Queens County	Joseph H. Cook	Liberal	1882
Queens County	Albert M. Hemeon (1887)	Liberal	1887
Richmond County	Joseph Matheson	Liberal	1886
Richmond County	David A. Hearn	Liberal-Conservative	1886
Shelburne County	Thomas Johnston	Liberal	1867, 1882
Shelburne County	William F. McCoy	Liberal	1882
Victoria County	John L. Bethune	Conservative	1886
Victoria County	John A. Fraser	Liberal	1874, 1886
Yarmouth County	William Law	Liberal	1886
Yarmouth County	Albert Gayton	Liberal	1871

== Notes ==
Preceded by 28th General Assembly of Nova Scotia	General Assemblies of Nova Scotia; 1886–1890	Succeeded by 30th General Assembly of Nova Scotia
