= Queens (Nova Scotia provincial electoral district) =

Provincial electoral district in Nova Scotia, Canada

Nova Scotia electoral district

Provincial electoral district
- Legislature: Nova Scotia House of Assembly
MLA
Kim Masland
Progressive Conservative
- District created: 1867, 2019
- District abolished: 2013
- District re-created: 2019
- Last contested: 2024

Demographics
- Population (2011): 12,294
- Electors: 9,974
- Area (km²): 3,087
- Pop. density (per km²): 4
- Census division(s): Annapolis, Queens County
- Census subdivision(s): Annapolis, Subd. D, Ponhook Lake 10, Region of Queens Municipality, Wildcat 12

Queens is a provincial electoral district in Nova Scotia, Canada which existed between 1867 and 2013 and since 2021. It elects one member to the Nova Scotia House of Assembly. The electoral district includes the entirety of Queens County and a small part of Annapolis.

The electoral district was abolished following the 2012 electoral boundary review and was largely replaced by the new electoral district of Queens-Shelburne. Following the 2019 electoral boundary review, the electoral district was re-created out of Queens-Shelburne.

== Geography ==
Queens covers 3,087 km^{2} (1,192 sq mi) of land area.

== Demographics ==
- Unemployment: 11%
- Population: 13,750
- Average income: $22,610
- University educated: 7%

== Members of the Legislative Assembly ==
The electoral district was represented by the following members of the Legislative Assembly:

Queens
Legislature	Years	Member	Party
40th	1933–1937	Seth M. Bartling	Liberal-Conservative
41st	1937–1941	John J. Cameron	Progressive Conservative
42nd	1941–1945	Harry Dennis Madden	Liberal
43rd	1945–1949	Merrill D. Rawding	Liberal
44th	1949–1953	Merrill D. Rawding	Liberal
45th	1953–1956	W. S. Kennedy Jones	Progressive Conservative
46th	1956–1960	W. S. Kennedy Jones	Progressive Conservative
47th	1960–1963	W. S. Kennedy Jones	Progressive Conservative
48th	1963–1967	W. S. Kennedy Jones	Progressive Conservative
49th	1967–1970	W. S. Kennedy Jones	Progressive Conservative
50th	1970–1971	W. S. Kennedy Jones	Progressive Conservative
50th	1971–1974	Floyd MacDonald	Progressive Conservative
51st	1974–1978	John Wickwire	Progressive Conservative
52nd	1978–1981	John Leefe	Progressive Conservative
53rd	1981–1984	John Leefe	Progressive Conservative
54th	1984–1988	John Leefe	Progressive Conservative
55th	1988–1993	John Leefe	Progressive Conservative
56th	1993–1998	John Leefe	Progressive Conservative
57th	1998–1999	John Leefe	Progressive Conservative
58th	1999–2003	Kerry Morash	Progressive Conservative
59th	2003–2006	Kerry Morash	Progressive Conservative
60th	2006–2009	Vicki Conrad	New Democratic
61st	2009–2013	Vicki Conrad	New Democratic
District dissolved into Queens-Shelburne in 2013, reformed in 2021
64th	2021–2024	Kim Masland	Progressive Conservative
65th	2024–present	Kim Masland	Progressive Conservative

Legislature	Years	Member	Party
Queens returned two members before 1933
39th	1928–1933	Donald W. MacKay	Liberal-Conservative	William Lorimer Hall	Liberal-Conservative
38th	1925–1928	Frank J.D. Barnjum	Conservative	William Lorimer Hall	Liberal-Conservative
37th	1920–1925	Jordan W. Smith	Liberal	George Spurr McClearn	Liberal
36th	1916–1920	Jordan W. Smith	Liberal	William Lorimer Hall	Liberal-Conservative
35th	1911–1916	Jordan W. Smith	Liberal	William Lorimer Hall	Liberal-Conservative
34th	1910–1911	Charles F. Cooper	Liberal	William Lorimer Hall	Liberal-Conservative
34th	1906–1910	Charles F. Cooper	Liberal	Edward Matthew Farrell	Liberal
33rd	1901–1906	Charles F. Cooper	Liberal	Edward Matthew Farrell	Liberal
32nd	1897–1901	Thomas Keillor	Liberal	Edward Matthew Farrell	Liberal
31st	1896–1897	Richard Hunt	Liberal	Edward Matthew Farrell	Liberal
31st	1894–1896	Richard Hunt	Liberal	Albert M. Hemeon	Liberal
30th	1890–1894	Richard Hunt	Liberal	Albert M. Hemeon	Liberal
29th	1887–1890	Joseph H. Cook	Liberal	Albert M. Hemeon	Liberal
29th	1886–1887	Joseph H. Cook	Liberal	Jason M. Mack	Liberal
28th	1882–1886	Joseph H. Cook	Liberal	Jason M. Mack	Liberal
27th	1878–1882	Leander Ford	Conservative	James C. Bartling	Conservative
26th	1874–1878	Isaac N. Mack	Liberal	Samuel Freeman	Liberal
25th	1871–1874	William Henry Smith	Liberal	Samuel Freeman	Liberal
24th	1867–1871	William Henry Smith	Liberal	Samuel Freeman	Liberal

== Election results ==
=== 2024 ===
2024 Nova Scotia general election
Party	Candidate	Votes	%	±%
Progressive Conservative	Kim Masland	3,461	79.93	+9.56
Liberal	Cathy DeRome	487	11.25	-9.14
New Democratic	Brian Skabar	382	8.82	+2.56
Total		4,330	–	
Total rejected ballots		21		
Turnout		4,354	46.65	
Eligible voters		9,333		
Progressive Conservative hold		Swing		
Source: Elections Nova Scotia

=== 2021 ===
2021 Nova Scotia general election
Party	Candidate	Votes	%	±%	Expenditures
Progressive Conservative	Kim Masland	3,627	70.37	+19.96	$29,760.72
Liberal	Susan McLeod	1,051	20.39	-7.04	$22,417.23
New Democratic	Mary Dahr	323	6.27	-12.28	$15,298.95
Green	Brian Muldoon	153	2.97	-0.64	$1,774.58
Total valid votes/expense limit		5,154	99.59	–	$55,342.78
Total rejected ballots		21	0.41		
Turnout		5,175	58.36		
Eligible voters		8,868			
Progressive Conservative notional hold		Swing		+13.50	
Source: Elections Nova Scotia

=== 2017 (transposed) ===
2017 provincial election redistributed results
Party	Vote	%
Progressive Conservative	2,332	50.41
Liberal	1,269	27.43
New Democratic	858	18.55
Green	167	3.61

=== 2009 ===
2009 Nova Scotia general election
Party	Candidate	Votes	%	±%
New Democratic	Vicki Conrad	4,012	59.82%	10.33%
Progressive Conservative	Kerry Morash	1,936	28.87%	-19.72%
Liberal	Wayne Henley	674	10.05%	–
Green	Stuart Simpson	85	1.27%	-0.66%
Total		6,707	–	
Source(s) Source: Nova Scotia Legislature (2024). "Electoral History for Queens County" (PDF). nslegislature.ca.

=== 2006 ===
2006 Nova Scotia general election
Party	Candidate	Votes	%	±%
New Democratic	Vicki Conrad	3,054	49.49%	12.14%
Progressive Conservative	Kerry Morash	2,998	48.58%	4.40%
Green	Margaret Witney	119	1.93%	–
Total		6,171	–	
Source(s) Source: Nova Scotia Legislature (2024). "Electoral History for Queens County" (PDF). nslegislature.ca.

=== 2003 ===
2003 Nova Scotia general election
Party	Candidate	Votes	%	±%
Progressive Conservative	Kerry Morash	2,721	44.19%	-11.05%
New Democratic	Vicki Conrad	2,300	37.35%	13.35%
Liberal	Win Seaton	1,137	18.46%	-2.30%
Total		6,158	–	
Source(s) Source: Nova Scotia Legislature (2024). "Electoral History for Queens County" (PDF). nslegislature.ca.

=== 1999 ===
1999 Nova Scotia general election
Party	Candidate	Votes	%	±%
Progressive Conservative	Kerry Morash	3,447	55.23%	0.91%
New Democratic	John Wiles	1,498	24.00%	9.75%
Liberal	Eddie Whitty	1,296	20.77%	-10.66%
Total		6,241	–	
Source(s) Source: Nova Scotia Legislature (2024). "Electoral History for Queens County" (PDF). nslegislature.ca. Nova Scotia, Chief Electoral Officer (1999). Returns of the General Election for the House of Assembly, Thirty-Fifth General Election (Report). Elections Nova Scotia.

=== 1998 ===
1998 Nova Scotia general election
Party	Candidate	Votes	%	±%
Progressive Conservative	John Leefe	3,582	54.32%	7.21%
Liberal	Terry Doucette	2,072	31.42%	-12.18%
New Democratic	Basil L. Griffin	940	14.26%	4.96%
Total		6,594	–	
Source(s) Source: Nova Scotia Legislature (2024). "Electoral History for Queens County" (PDF). nslegislature.ca.

=== 1993 ===
1993 Nova Scotia general election
Party	Candidate	Votes	%	±%
Progressive Conservative	John Leefe	3,529	47.11%	-8.93%
Liberal	Marilyn Large	3,266	43.60%	13.14%
New Democratic	Anne Corbin	696	9.29%	-4.22%
Total		7,491	–	
Source(s) Source: Nova Scotia Legislature (2024). "Electoral History for Queens County" (PDF). nslegislature.ca. Nova Scotia, Chief Electoral Officer (1993). Returns of the General Election for the House of Assembly, Thirty-Third General Election (PDF) (Report). Queen's Printer. Archived from the original (PDF) on 18 June 2018.

=== 1988 ===
1988 Nova Scotia general election
Party	Candidate	Votes	%	±%
Progressive Conservative	John Leefe	4,099	56.04%	-3.88%
Liberal	Dave Randall	2,228	30.46%	5.38%
New Democratic	Margo Kleiker	988	13.51%	-1.50%
Total		7,315	–	
Source(s) Source: Nova Scotia Legislature (2024). "Electoral History for Queens County" (PDF). nslegislature.ca. Nova Scotia, Chief Electoral Officer (1988). Returns of the General Election for the House of Assembly, Thirty-Second General Election (PDF) (Report). Queen's Printer. Archived from the original (PDF) on 7 July 2018.

=== 1984 ===
1984 Nova Scotia general election
Party	Candidate	Votes	%	±%
Progressive Conservative	John Leefe	3,661	59.92%	-5.27%
Liberal	Hugh Mosher	1,532	25.07%	1.13%
New Democratic	Bill Zimmerman	917	15.01%	4.14%
Total		6,110	–	
Source(s) Source: Nova Scotia Legislature (2024). "Electoral History for Queens County" (PDF). nslegislature.ca. Nova Scotia, Chief Electoral Officer (1984). Returns of the General Election for the House of Assembly, Thirty-First General Election (PDF) (Report). Queen's Printer. Archived from the original (PDF) on 31 July 2017.

=== 1981 ===
1981 Nova Scotia general election
Party	Candidate	Votes	%	±%
Progressive Conservative	John Leefe	4,114	65.19%	12.47%
Liberal	Mervin W. Hartlen	1,511	23.94%	-9.91%
New Democratic	David K. Sampson	686	10.87%	-2.56%
Total		6,311	–	
Source(s) Source: Nova Scotia Legislature (2024). "Electoral History for Queens County" (PDF). nslegislature.ca. Nova Scotia, Chief Electoral Officer (1981). Returns of the General Election for the House of Assembly, Thirtieth General Election (PDF) (Report). Queen's Printer. Archived from the original (PDF) on 31 July 2017.

=== 1978 ===
1978 Nova Scotia general election
Party	Candidate	Votes	%	±%
Progressive Conservative	John Leefe	3,800	52.72%	8.22%
Liberal	R. Keith Wyer	2,440	33.85%	-6.73%
New Democratic	A. J. D'Entremont	968	13.43%	-1.49%
Total		7,208	–	
Source(s) Source: Nova Scotia Legislature (2024). "Electoral History for Queens County" (PDF). nslegislature.ca. Nova Scotia, Chief Electoral Officer (1978). Returns of the General Election for the House of Assembly, Twenty-Ninth General Election (PDF) (Report). Queen's Printer. Archived from the original (PDF) on 18 June 2018.

=== 1974 ===
1974 Nova Scotia general election
Party	Candidate	Votes	%	±%
Progressive Conservative	John Wickwire	2,905	44.50%	-8.79%
Liberal	R. Keith Wyer	2,649	40.58%	-0.17%
New Democratic	A. J. D'Entremont	974	14.92%	8.96%
Total		6,528	–	
Source(s) Source: Nova Scotia Legislature (2024). "Electoral History for Queens County" (PDF). nslegislature.ca. Nova Scotia, Chief Electoral Officer (1974). Returns of the General Election for the House of Assembly, Twenty-Eighth General Election (PDF) (Report). Queen's Printer. Archived from the original (PDF) on 18 June 2018.

=== 1971 ===
Nova Scotia provincial by-election, 1971-11-16
Party	Candidate	Votes	%	±%
Progressive Conservative	Floyd MacDonald	3,434	53.29%	1.30%
Liberal	Harley Umphrey	2,626	40.75%	-7.26%
New Democratic	Albert Roy	384	5.96%	–
Total		6,444	–	
Source(s) Source: Nova Scotia Legislature (2024). "Electoral History for Queens County" (PDF). nslegislature.ca.

=== 1970 ===
1970 Nova Scotia general election
Party	Candidate	Votes	%	±%
Progressive Conservative	W. S. Kennedy Jones	3,068	51.99%	-5.70%
Liberal	Harley Umphrey	2,833	48.01%	5.70%
Total		5,901	–	
Source(s) Source: Nova Scotia Legislature (2024). "Electoral History for Queens County" (PDF). nslegislature.ca. Nova Scotia, Legislative Assembly (1970). Returns of the General Election for the House of Assembly, 1970 (PDF) (Report). Queen's Printer. Archived from the original (PDF) on 25 July 2018.

=== 1967 ===
1967 Nova Scotia general election
Party	Candidate	Votes	%	±%
Progressive Conservative	W. S. Kennedy Jones	3,290	57.69%	-8.16%
Liberal	G. Cecil Day	2,413	42.31%	8.16%
Total		5,703	–	
Source(s) Source: Nova Scotia Legislature (2024). "Electoral History for Queens County" (PDF). nslegislature.ca. Nova Scotia Legislature (1967). Returns of the General Election for the House of Assembly (PDF) (Report). Queen's Printer. Archived from the original (PDF) on 25 July 2018.

=== 1963 ===
1963 Nova Scotia general election
Party	Candidate	Votes	%	±%
Progressive Conservative	W. S. Kennedy Jones	3,833	65.85%	6.81%
Liberal	W. Alton Snow	1,988	34.15%	-6.81%
Total		5,821	–	
Source(s) Source: Nova Scotia Legislature (2024). "Electoral History for Queens County" (PDF). nslegislature.ca. Nova Scotia Legislature (1963). Returns of the General Election for the House of Assembly (PDF) (Report). Queen's Printer. Archived from the original (PDF) on 25 July 2018.

=== 1960 ===
1960 Nova Scotia general election
Party	Candidate	Votes	%	±%
Progressive Conservative	W. S. Kennedy Jones	3,770	59.04%	8.27%
Liberal	Della P. Richardson	2,616	40.96%	-8.27%
Total		6,386	–	
Source(s) Source: Nova Scotia Legislature (2024). "Electoral History for Queens County" (PDF). nslegislature.ca. Nova Scotia Legislature (1960). Returns of the General Election for the House of Assembly (PDF) (Report). Queen's Printer. Archived from the original (PDF) on 25 July 2018.

=== 1956 ===
1956 Nova Scotia general election
Party	Candidate	Votes	%	±%
Progressive Conservative	W. S. Kennedy Jones	3,067	50.77%	-1.32%
Liberal	Merrill D. Rawding	2,974	49.23%	3.46%
Total		6,041	–	
Source(s) Source: Nova Scotia Legislature (2024). "Electoral History for Queens County" (PDF). nslegislature.ca. Nova Scotia Legislature (1956). Returns of the General Election for the House of Assembly (PDF) (Report). Queen's Printer. Archived from the original (PDF) on 10 September 2018.

=== 1953 ===
1953 Nova Scotia general election
Party	Candidate	Votes	%	±%
Progressive Conservative	W. S. Kennedy Jones	3,230	52.09%	7.04%
Liberal	Merrill D. Rawding	2,838	45.77%	-4.45%
Co-operative Commonwealth	Claude Vanbuskirk	133	2.14%	-2.60%
Total		6,201	–	
Source(s) Source: Nova Scotia Legislature (2024). "Electoral History for Queens County" (PDF). nslegislature.ca. Nova Scotia Legislature (1953). Returns of the General Election for the House of Assembly (PDF) (Report). Queen's Printer. Archived from the original (PDF) on 10 September 2018.

=== 1949 ===
1949 Nova Scotia general election
Party	Candidate	Votes	%	±%
Liberal	Merrill D. Rawding	3,166	50.21%	2.04%
Progressive Conservative	E. M. More	2,840	45.04%	2.65%
Co-operative Commonwealth	J. N. McIntyre	299	4.74%	-4.69%
Total		6,305	–	
Source(s) Source: Nova Scotia Legislature (2024). "Electoral History for Queens County" (PDF). nslegislature.ca. Nova Scotia Legislature (1949). Returns of the General Election for the House of Assembly (PDF) (Report). Queen's Printer. Archived from the original (PDF) on 10 September 2018.

=== 1945 ===
1945 Nova Scotia general election
Party	Candidate	Votes	%	±%
Liberal	Merrill D. Rawding	2,844	48.17%	-1.96%
Progressive Conservative	L. W. Fraser	2,503	42.39%	-7.47%
Co-operative Commonwealth	C. Webber	557	9.43%	–
Total		5,904	–	
Source(s) Source: Nova Scotia Legislature (2024). "Electoral History for Queens County" (PDF). nslegislature.ca. Nova Scotia Legislature (1945). Returns of the General Election for the House of Assembly (PDF) (Report). Queen's Printer. Archived from the original (PDF) on 10 September 2018.

=== 1941 ===
1941 Nova Scotia general election
Party	Candidate	Votes	%	±%
Liberal	Harry Dennis Madden	2,461	50.13%	2.05%
Progressive Conservative	John J. Cameron	2,448	49.87%	-2.05%
Total		4,909	–	
Source(s) Source: Nova Scotia Legislature (2024). "Electoral History for Queens County" (PDF). nslegislature.ca. Nova Scotia Legislature (1941). Returns of the General Election for the House of Assembly (PDF) (Report). Queen's Printer. Archived from the original (PDF) on 8 February 2024.

=== 1937 ===
1937 Nova Scotia general election
Party	Candidate	Votes	%	±%
Progressive Conservative	John J. Cameron	2,931	51.91%	1.00%
Liberal	J. Ross Byrne	2,715	48.09%	-1.00%
Total		5,646	–	
Source(s) Source: Nova Scotia Legislature (2024). "Electoral History for Queens County" (PDF). nslegislature.ca. Nova Scotia Legislature (1937). Returns of the General Election for the House of Assembly (PDF) (Report). Queen's Printer. Archived from the original (PDF) on 1 March 2019.

=== 1933 ===
1933 Nova Scotia general election
Party	Candidate	Votes	%	±%
Liberal-Conservative	Seth M. Bartling	2,880	50.91%	-4.23%
Liberal	Roland M. Irving	2,777	49.09%	4.23%
Total		5,657	–	
Source(s) Source: Nova Scotia Legislature (2024). "Electoral History for Queens County" (PDF). nslegislature.ca. Nova Scotia Legislature (1933). Returns of the General Election for the House of Assembly (PDF) (Report). Queen's Printer. Archived from the original (PDF) on 1 March 2019.

=== 1928 ===
1928 Nova Scotia general election
Party	Candidate	Votes	%	Elected
Liberal-Conservative	William Lorimer Hall	2,206	29.36%	✓
Liberal-Conservative	Donald W. MacKay	1,937	25.78%	✓
Liberal	Roland M. Irving	1,721	22.91%	
Liberal	Frederick Dickie	1,649	21.95%	
Total		7,513	–	
Source(s) Source: Nova Scotia Legislature (2024). "Electoral History for Queens County" (PDF). nslegislature.ca.

=== 1926 ===
Nova Scotia provincial by-election, 1926-08-30
Party	Candidate	Votes	%	Elected
Liberal-Conservative	William Lorimer Hall	acclaimed	N/A	✓
Total			–	
Source(s) Source: Nova Scotia Legislature (2024). "Electoral History for Queens County" (PDF). nslegislature.ca.

=== 1925 ===
1925 Nova Scotia general election
Party	Candidate	Votes	%	Elected
Liberal-Conservative	Frank J.D. Barnjum	1,982	26.34%	✓
Liberal-Conservative	William Lorimer Hall	1,934	25.70%	✓
Liberal	Jordan W. Smith	1,874	24.90%	
Liberal	George Spurr McClearn	1,735	23.06%	
Total		7,525	–	
Source(s) Source: Nova Scotia Legislature (2024). "Electoral History for Queens County" (PDF). nslegislature.ca.

=== 1920 ===
1920 Nova Scotia general election
Party	Candidate	Votes	%	Elected
Liberal	Jordan W. Smith	1,737	28.27%	✓
Liberal	George Spurr McClearn	1,607	26.15%	✓
Liberal-Conservative	William Lorimer Hall	1,485	24.17%	
Liberal-Conservative	Robert Smith	1,316	21.42%	
Total		6,145	–	
Source(s) Source: Nova Scotia Legislature (2024). "Electoral History for Queens County" (PDF). nslegislature.ca.

=== 1916 ===
1916 Nova Scotia general election
Party	Candidate	Votes	%	Elected
Liberal-Conservative	William Lorimer Hall	1,116	26.65%	✓
Liberal	Jordan W. Smith	1,098	26.22%	✓
Liberal-Conservative	D. C. Mulhall	997	23.81%	
Liberal	Frederick R. Freeman	977	23.33%	
Total		4,188	–	
Source(s) Source: Nova Scotia Legislature (2024). "Electoral History for Queens County" (PDF). nslegislature.ca.

=== 1911 ===
1911 Nova Scotia general election
Party	Candidate	Votes	%	Elected
Liberal-Conservative	William Lorimer Hall	1,079	27.23%	✓
Liberal	Jordan W. Smith	1,047	26.42%	✓
Liberal-Conservative	Philson Kempton	953	24.05%	
Liberal	W. P. Purney	884	22.31%	
Total		3,963	–	
Source(s) Source: Nova Scotia Legislature (2024). "Electoral History for Queens County" (PDF). nslegislature.ca.

=== 1909 ===
Nova Scotia provincial by-election, 1909-11-16
Party	Candidate	Votes	%	Elected
Liberal-Conservative	William Lorimer Hall	1,123	55.68%	✓
Liberal	A. W. Hendry	894	44.32%	
Total		2,017	–	
Source(s) Source: Nova Scotia Legislature (2024). "Electoral History for Queens County" (PDF). nslegislature.ca.

=== 1906 ===
1906 Nova Scotia general election
Party	Candidate	Votes	%	Elected
Liberal	Edward Matthew Farrell	1,008	31.28%	✓
Liberal	Charles F. Cooper	874	27.13%	✓
Liberal-Conservative	J. S. Hughes	754	23.40%	
Liberal-Conservative	J. G. Pyke	586	18.19%	
Total		3,222	–	
Source(s) Source: Nova Scotia Legislature (2024). "Electoral History for Queens County" (PDF). nslegislature.ca.

=== 1901 ===
1901 Nova Scotia general election
Party	Candidate	Votes	%	Elected
Liberal	Edward Matthew Farrell	925	27.95%	✓
Liberal	Charles F. Cooper	843	25.48%	✓
Liberal-Conservative	John Hutt	783	23.66%	
Liberal-Conservative	W. L. Libbey	758	22.91%	
Total		3,309	–	
Source(s) Source: Nova Scotia Legislature (2024). "Electoral History for Queens County" (PDF). nslegislature.ca.

=== 1897 ===
1897 Nova Scotia general election
Party	Candidate	Votes	%	Elected
Liberal	Edward Matthew Farrell	876	26.38%	✓
Liberal	Thomas Keillor	712	21.44%	✓
Liberal	John Millard	704	21.20%	
Liberal-Conservative	John Hutt	666	20.05%	
Liberal	R. R. McLeod	184	5.54%	
Liberal-Conservative	T. H. Siddell	179	5.39%	
Total		3,321	–	
Source(s) Source: Nova Scotia Legislature (2024). "Electoral History for Queens County" (PDF). nslegislature.ca.

=== 1896 ===
Nova Scotia provincial by-election, 1896-08-15
Party	Candidate	Votes	%	Elected
Liberal	Edward Matthew Farrell	acclaimed	N/A	✓
Total			–	
Source(s) Source: Nova Scotia Legislature (2024). "Electoral History for Queens County" (PDF). nslegislature.ca.

=== 1894 ===
1894 Nova Scotia general election
Party	Candidate	Votes	%	Elected
Liberal	Albert M. Hemeon	913	28.83%	✓
Liberal	Richard Hunt	912	28.80%	✓
Liberal-Conservative	John Hutt	703	22.20%	
Liberal-Conservative	O. L. Patch	639	20.18%	
Total		3,167	–	
Source(s) Source: Nova Scotia Legislature (2024). "Electoral History for Queens County" (PDF). nslegislature.ca.

=== 1890 ===
1890 Nova Scotia general election
Party	Candidate	Votes	%	Elected
Liberal	Richard Hunt	897	28.12%	✓
Liberal	Albert M. Hemeon	887	27.81%	✓
Liberal-Conservative	Leander Ford	722	22.63%	
Liberal-Conservative	C. A. Bowlby	684	21.44%	
Total		3,190	–	
Source(s) Source: Nova Scotia Legislature (2024). "Electoral History for Queens County" (PDF). nslegislature.ca.

=== 1887 ===
Nova Scotia provincial by-election, 1887-03-08
Party	Candidate	Votes	%	Elected
Liberal	Albert M. Hemeon	857	66.80%	✓
Liberal-Conservative	James Coles	426	33.20%	
Total		1,283	–	
Source(s) Source: Nova Scotia Legislature (2024). "Electoral History for Queens County" (PDF). nslegislature.ca.

=== 1886 ===
1886 Nova Scotia general election
Party	Candidate	Votes	%	Elected
Liberal	Jason M. Mack	787	29.25%	✓
Liberal	Joseph H. Cook	762	28.32%	✓
Liberal-Conservative	Leander Ford	622	23.11%	
Liberal-Conservative	James C. Bartling	520	19.32%	
Total		2,691	–	
Source(s) Source: Nova Scotia Legislature (2024). "Electoral History for Queens County" (PDF). nslegislature.ca.

=== 1882 ===
1882 Nova Scotia general election
Party	Candidate	Votes	%	Elected
Liberal	Joseph H. Cook	689	28.28%	✓
Liberal	Jason M. Mack	644	26.44%	✓
Liberal-Conservative	James C. Bartling	555	22.78%	
Liberal-Conservative	Leander Ford	548	22.50%	
Total		2,436	–	
Source(s) Source: Nova Scotia Legislature (2024). "Electoral History for Queens County" (PDF). nslegislature.ca.

=== 1878 ===
1878 Nova Scotia general election
Party	Candidate	Votes	%	Elected
Liberal-Conservative	Leander Ford	607	24.38%	✓
Liberal-Conservative	James C. Bartling	534	21.45%	✓
Liberal	Samuel Freeman	531	21.33%	
Liberal	Jason M. Mack	503	20.20%	
Liberal	Albert M. Hemeon	315	12.65%	
Total		2,490	–	
Source(s) Source: Nova Scotia Legislature (2024). "Electoral History for Queens County" (PDF). nslegislature.ca.

=== 1874 ===
1874 Nova Scotia general election
Party	Candidate	Votes	%	Elected
Liberal	Isaac N. Mack	740	32.46%	✓
Liberal	Samuel Freeman	705	30.92%	✓
Liberal-Conservative	Charles Allison	441	19.34%	
Liberal-Conservative	George Starrat Parker	394	17.28%	
Total		2,280	–	
Source(s) Source: Nova Scotia Legislature (2024). "Electoral History for Queens County" (PDF). nslegislature.ca.

=== 1871 ===
1871 Nova Scotia general election
Party	Candidate	Votes	%	Elected
Liberal	Samuel Freeman	829	33.71%	✓
Liberal	William Henry Smith	826	33.59%	✓
Liberal-Conservative	Thomas Patillo	465	18.91%	
Liberal-Conservative	Will Hendry	339	13.79%	
Total		2,459	–	
Source(s) Source: Nova Scotia Legislature (2024). "Electoral History for Queens County" (PDF). nslegislature.ca.

=== 1867 ===
1867 Nova Scotia general election
Party	Candidate	Votes	%	Elected
Anti-Confederation	William Henry Smith	792	36.65%	✓
Anti-Confederation	Samuel Freeman	785	36.33%	✓
Confederation	Allison	310	14.35%	
Confederation	A. J. Campbell	274	12.68%	
Total		2,161	–	
Source(s) Source: Nova Scotia Legislature (2024). "Electoral History for Queens County" (PDF). nslegislature.ca.

== See also ==
- List of Nova Scotia provincial electoral districts
- Canadian provincial electoral districts
