= Speaker of the Nova Scotia House of Assembly =

Canadian provincial legislative officer

The Speaker for the House of Assembly of Nova Scotia is the presiding Officer of the House of Assembly. Danielle Barkhouse is the current Speaker of the 64th General Assembly of Nova Scotia.

The Speaker presides over the proceedings of the Assembly, maintains order, regulates debate in accordance with the rules and practices of the House, and ensures that all viewpoints have the opportunity of a hearing.

The Speaker does not take part in the debates of the Assembly and only takes part in a vote to cast the deciding vote in the event of a tie. They are the guardian of the privileges of the Assembly and protects the rights of its Members.

The Speaker is the only representative of the House of Assembly. The Speaker has jurisdiction and day to day control over all matters concerning Province House, including operations, maintenance and restoration, and administration of the adjacent office complexes at One Government Place, the George Building, and the Provincial Building. The Speaker is the Chair of the Legislature Internal Economy Board, the body responsible for regulating services to Members.

In the House, Speaker decides questions of order and rules on questions of privilege after allowing appropriate debate. Decisions of the Speaker are not debatable or subject to appeal except by a substantive motion after proper notice has been given.

== Speakers of the House of Assembly ==
No.	Portrait	Name Electoral district (Birth–Death)	Term of office	Party	General Assembly
1		Robert Sanderson; MLA (1696–after 1761)	1758–1759	Independent	1st
2		William Nesbitt; MLA for Halifax County (1707–1784)	1759–1783	Independent	2nd
2		William Nesbitt; MLA for Halifax County (1707–1784)	1759–1783	Independent	3rd
2		William Nesbitt; MLA for Halifax County (1707–1784)	1759–1783	Independent	4th
2		William Nesbitt; MLA for Halifax County (1707–1784)	1759–1783	Independent	5th
3		Thomas Cochran; MLA for Liverpool Township (1733–1801)	1784–1785	Independent	5th
4		Sampson Salter Blowers; MLA for Halifax County (1742–1842)	1785–1789	Independent	6th
5		Richard John Uniacke; MLA for Halifax County (1753–1830)	1789–1793	Independent	6th
6		Thomas Henry Barclay; MLA for Halifax County (1753–1830)	1793–1799	Independent	7th
(5)		Richard John Uniacke; MLA for Queens County (1753–1830)	1799–1805	Independent	7th
(5)		Richard John Uniacke; MLA for Queens County (1753–1830)	1799–1805	Independent	8th
7		William Cottnam Tonge; MLA for Newport Township (1764–1832)	1805–1806	Independent	8th
8		Lewis Morris Wilkins; MLA for Lunenburg County (1768–1848)	1806–1817	Conservative	9th
8		Lewis Morris Wilkins; MLA for Lunenburg County (1768–1848)	1806–1817	Conservative	10th
9		Simon Bradstreet Robie; MLA for Halifax County (1770–1858)	1817–1824	Conservative	10th
9		Simon Bradstreet Robie; MLA for Halifax County (1770–1858)	1817–1824	Conservative	11th
9		Simon Bradstreet Robie; MLA for Halifax County (1770–1858)	1817–1824	Conservative	12th
10		Samuel George William Archibald; MLA for Halifax County (until 1836); MLA for Colchester County (from 1836) (1777–1846)	1824–1840	Reformer	12th
10		Samuel George William Archibald; MLA for Halifax County (until 1836); MLA for Colchester County (from 1836) (1777–1846)	1824–1840	Reformer	13th
10		Samuel George William Archibald; MLA for Halifax County (until 1836); MLA for Colchester County (from 1836) (1777–1846)	1824–1840	Reformer	14th
10		Samuel George William Archibald; MLA for Halifax County (until 1836); MLA for Colchester County (from 1836) (1777–1846)	1824–1840	Reformer	15th
11		Joseph Howe; MLA for Halifax County (1804–1873)	1840–1843	Reformer	16th
12		William Young; MLA for Inverness County (1799–1887)	1843–1855	Reformer	17th
12		William Young; MLA for Inverness County (1799–1887)	1843–1855	Reformer	18th
12		William Young; MLA for Inverness County (1799–1887)	1843–1855	Reformer	19th
13		Stewart Campbell; MLA for Guysborough County (1812–1885)	1855–1863	Liberal	20th
13		Stewart Campbell; MLA for Guysborough County (1812–1885)	1855–1863	Liberal	22nd
14		John Chipman Wade; MLA for Digby County (1817–1892)	1863–1867	Conservative	23rd
15		John Joseph Marshall; MLA for Guysborough (1807–1870)	1867–1870	Anti-Confederation	24th
16		Jared C. Troop; MLA for Annapolis (1837–1876)	1870–1874	Anti-Confederation	24th
16		Jared C. Troop; MLA for Annapolis (1837–1876)	1870–1874	Liberal	25th
17		John Barnhill Dickie; MLA for Colchester (1829–1886)	1874–1875	Liberal	26th
18		Mather Byles DesBrisay; MLA for Lunenburg (1828–1900)	1875–1876	Liberal	26th
19		Isaac N. Mack; MLA for Queens (1838–1925)	1877–1878	Liberal	26th
20		Ebenezer Tilton Moseley; MLA for Cape Breton (1844–1898)	1878–1882	Liberal-Conservative	27th
21		Angus McGillivray; MLA for Antigonish (1842–1917)	1882–1886	Liberal	28th
22		Michael Joseph Power; MLA for Halifax (1834–1895)	1886–1894	Liberal	29th
22		Michael Joseph Power; MLA for Halifax (1834–1895)	1886–1894	Liberal	30th
23		Frederick Andrew Laurence; MLA for Colchester (1843–1912)	1894–1901	Liberal	31st
23		Frederick Andrew Laurence; MLA for Colchester (1843–1912)	1894–1901	Liberal	32nd
24		Thomas Robertson; MLA for Shelburne (1852–1902)	1902	Liberal	33rd
(23)		Frederick Andrew Laurence; MLA for Colchester (1843–1912)	1903–1904	Liberal	33rd
25		Edward Matthew Farrell; MLA for Queens (1854–1931)	1905–1910	Liberal	33rd
25		Edward Matthew Farrell; MLA for Queens (1854–1931)	1905–1910	Liberal	34th
26		George Everett Faulkner; MLA for Halifax (1855–1931)	1910–1911	Liberal	34th
27		James F. Ellis; MLA for Guysborough (1869–1937)	1912–1916	Liberal	35th
27		James F. Ellis; MLA for Guysborough (1869–1937)	1912–1916	Liberal	36th
28		Robert Irwin; MLA for Shelburne (1865–1941)	1917–1925	Liberal	36th
28		Robert Irwin; MLA for Shelburne (1865–1941)	1917–1925	Liberal	37th
29		Albert Parsons; MLA for Hants (1869–1948)	1926–1928	Liberal-Conservative	38th
30		Daniel George McKenzie; MLA for Hants (1860–1940)	1929–1933	Liberal-Conservative	39th
31		Lindsay C. Gardner; MLA for Yarmouth (1875–1938)	1934–1938	Liberal	40th
31		Lindsay C. Gardner; MLA for Yarmouth (1875–1938)	1934–1938	Liberal	41st
32		Moses Elijah McGarry; MLA for Inverness (1878–1949)	1939–1940	Liberal	41st
33		Gordon E. Romkey; MLA for Lunenburg (1885–1977)	1940–1953	Liberal	41st
33		Gordon E. Romkey; MLA for Lunenburg (1885–1977)	1940–1953	Liberal	42nd
33		Gordon E. Romkey; MLA for Lunenburg (1885–1977)	1940–1953	Liberal	43rd
33		Gordon E. Romkey; MLA for Lunenburg (1885–1977)	1940–1953	Liberal	44th
34		John Smith MacIvor; MLA for Cape Breton South (1913–1957)	1954–1956	Liberal	45th
35		W. S. Kennedy Jones; MLA for Queens (1919–1978)	1957–1960	Progressive Conservative	46th
36		Harvey Veniot; MLA for Pictou West (1915–2009)	1961–1968	Progressive Conservative	47th
36		Harvey Veniot; MLA for Pictou West (1915–2009)	1961–1968	Progressive Conservative	48th
36		Harvey Veniot; MLA for Pictou West (1915–2009)	1961–1968	Progressive Conservative	49th
37		Gordon H. Fitzgerald; MLA for Halifax Cobequid (1927–2014)	1969–1970	Progressive Conservative	49th
38		George M. Mitchell; MLA for Halifax Cornwallis (born 1932)	1970–1973	Liberal	50th
39		James L. Connolly; MLA for Halifax Chebucto (1909–1982)	1973–1974	Liberal	50th
40		Vince MacLean; MLA for Cape Breton South (born 1944)	1974–1976	Liberal	51st
41		George Doucet; MLA for Halifax Cobequid (1939–2024)	1977–1978	Liberal	51st
42		Ron Russell; MLA for Hants West (1926–2019)	1978–1981	Progressive Conservative	52nd
43		Art Donahoe; MLA for Halifax Citadel (born 1940)	1981–1991	Progressive Conservative	52nd
43		Art Donahoe; MLA for Halifax Citadel (born 1940)	1981–1991	Progressive Conservative	53rd
43		Art Donahoe; MLA for Halifax Citadel (born 1940)	1981–1991	Progressive Conservative	54th
43		Art Donahoe; MLA for Halifax Citadel (born 1940)	1981–1991	Progressive Conservative	55th
(42)		Ron Russell; MLA for Hants West (1926–2019)	1991–1993	Progressive Conservative	55th
44		Paul MacEwan; MLA for Cape Breton Nova (1943–2017)	1993–1996	Liberal	56th
45		Wayne Gaudet; MLA for Clare (born 1955)	1996–1997	Liberal	56th
46		Gerry Fogarty; MLA for Halifax Bedford Basin (born TBA)	1997–1998	Liberal	56th
(42)		Ron Russell; MLA for Hants West (1926–2019)	1998–1999	Progressive Conservative	57th
47		Murray Scott; MLA for Cumberland South (born 1953)	1999–2006	Progressive Conservative	58th
47		Murray Scott; MLA for Cumberland South (born 1953)	1999–2006	Progressive Conservative	59th
48		Cecil Clarke; MLA for Cape Breton North (born 1968)	2006–2007	Progressive Conservative	60th
49		Alfie MacLeod; MLA for Cape Breton West (1956–2025)	2007–2009	Progressive Conservative	60th
50		Charlie Parker; MLA for Pictou West (born 1951)	2009–2011	New Democratic	61st
51		Gordie Gosse; MLA for Cape Breton Nova (1955–2019)	2011–2013	New Democratic	61st
52		Kevin Murphy; MLA for Eastern Shore (born 1970)	2013–2021	Liberal	62nd
52		Kevin Murphy; MLA for Eastern Shore (born 1970)	2013–2021	Liberal	63rd
53		Keith Bain; MLA for Victoria-The Lakes (born 1952)	2021–2023	Progressive Conservative	64th
54		Karla MacFarlane; MLA for Pictou West (born 1969)	2023–2024	Progressive Conservative	64th
55		Danielle Barkhouse; MLA for Chester-St. Margaret's (born 1976)	2024–present	Progressive Conservative	64th

== See also ==
- Mace of Nova Scotia
- List of premiers of Nova Scotia
