= Bartling =

Bartling is a surname that may refer to

- Charlie Bartling (1912–1998), Australian rules football player
- Doby Bartling (1913–1992), American football player and coach
- Friedrich Gottlieb Bartling (1798–1875), German botanist
- Irv Bartling (1914–1973), American baseball infielder
- James C. Bartling (1819–1906), Canadian sailor, merchant and politician
- Julie Bartling (born 1958), American politician
- Seth M. Bartling (1886–1954), Canadian politician
