= Donald W. MacKay =

Canadian politician

MLA for Queens
- In office 1928–1933
- Preceded by: Frank J.D. Barnjum
- Succeeded by: Seth M. Bartling

Personal details
- Born: January 3, 1874 Santa Rosa, California
- Died: January 26, 1952 (aged 78) Liverpool, Nova Scotia
- Party: Liberal-Conservative
- Occupation: tailor

Donald Willard MacKay (January 3, 1874 – January 26, 1952) was a Canadian politician. He represented the electoral district of Queens in the Nova Scotia House of Assembly from 1928 to 1933. He was a Liberal-Conservative member.

MacKay was born in 1874 at Santa Rosa, California, and moved to Nova Scotia in 1877. He married Reta Cook, and was a tailor by career. MacKay served as mayor and town councillor in Liverpool, Nova Scotia. MacKay entered provincial politics in 1928 when he was elected in the dual-member Queens County riding with William Lorimer Hall. He did not reoffer in the 1933 election. MacKay died at Liverpool on January 26, 1952.
