= 28th Nova Scotia general election =

The 28th Nova Scotia general election may refer to

- the 1882 Nova Scotia general election, the 27th overall general election for Nova Scotia, for the (due to a counting error in 1859) 28th General Assembly of Nova Scotia,
- the 1886 Nova Scotia general election, the 28th overall general election for Nova Scotia, for the 29th General Assembly of Nova Scotia, but considered the 6th general election for the Canadian province of Nova Scotia, or
- the 1974 Nova Scotia general election, the 50th overall general election for Nova Scotia, for the 51st Legislative Assembly of Nova Scotia, but considered the 28th general election for the Canadian province of Nova Scotia.
