= 27th Nova Scotia general election =

The 27th Nova Scotia general election may refer to

- the 1878 Nova Scotia general election, the 26th overall general election for Nova Scotia, for the (due to a counting error in 1859) 27th General Assembly of Nova Scotia,
- the 1882 Nova Scotia general election, the 27th overall general election for Nova Scotia, for the 28th General Assembly of Nova Scotia, but considered the 5th general election for the Canadian province of Nova Scotia, or
- the 1970 Nova Scotia general election, the 49th overall general election for Nova Scotia, for the 50th Legislative Assembly of Nova Scotia, but considered the 27th general election for the Canadian province of Nova Scotia.
