= Edward Farrell =

Edward Farrell may refer to:

- Edward Farrell (athlete) (1885–1953), American track and field athlete
- Edward Farrell (Medal of Honor) (1833–?), American Civil War sailor and Medal of Honor recipient
- Edward Farrell (physician) (1842–1901), physician and political figure in Nova Scotia, Canada
- Edward Matthew Farrell (1854–1931), Canadian printer, publisher, and politician from the province of Nova Scotia
- Doc Farrell (1901–1966), baseball player
- Edward Shea Farrell (born 1957), American actor and producer
- Ed Farrell, American football, see List of Pittsburgh Steelers players
- Ted Farrell (Coronation Street), fictional character in Coronation Street
- Ted Farrell (1889–1960), Australian footballer for Fitzroy and Richmond
