= 50th General Assembly of Nova Scotia =

1970–1974 House of Assembly session

- Minority parliament
- Dec. 10, 1970 – Feb. 23, 1974

Parliament leaders
- Premier: Gerald Regan; October 28, 1970
- Leader of the Opposition: George Isaac Smith; October 28, 1970 – March 6, 1971
- John Buchanan; March 6, 1971

Party caucuses
- Government: Liberal Party
- Opposition: Progressive Conservative Party
- Recognized: New Democratic Party

House of Assembly
- Speaker of the House: George M. Mitchell; December 10, 1970 – April 6, 1973
- James L. Connolly; November 27, 1973 – February 23, 1974
- Members: 46 MLA seats

Sovereign
- Monarch: Elizabeth II; February 6, 1952
- Lieutenant governor: Victor de Bedia Oland; July 22, 1968 – October 1, 1973
- Clarence Gosse; October 1, 1973

Sessions
- 1st session December 10, 1970 – April 8, 1971
- 2nd session June 28, 1971 – July 8, 1971
- 3rd session February 9, 1972 – May 15, 1972
- 4th session January 25, 1973 – April 6, 1973
- 5th session November 27, 1973 – February 23, 1974
← 49th	→ 51st

The 50th General Assembly of Nova Scotia represented Nova Scotia between December 10, 1970, and February 23, 1974.

== Division of seats ==
There were 46 members of the General Assembly, elected in the 1970 Nova Scotia general election.

Leader	Party	# of Seats
Gerald Regan	Liberal	23
George Isaac Smith	Progressive Conservative	21
Jeremy Akerman	NDP	2
Total		46

== List of members ==
Riding	Name	Party	First elected / previously elected	Position
Annapolis East	Gerry Sheehy	Progressive Conservative	1970	
Annapolis West	Peter Murray Nicholson	Liberal	1956	
Antigonish	J. William Gillis	Liberal	1970	
Cape Breton South	John Francis Burke	Progressive Conservative	1970	
Cape Breton Centre	Mike Laffin	Progressive Conservative	1963	
Cape Breton North	Tom McKeough	Progressive Conservative	1960	
Cape Breton Nova	Paul MacEwan	New Democratic Party	1970	
Cape Breton East	Jeremy Akerman	New Democratic Party	1970	
Cape Breton West	Allan Sullivan	Liberal	1970	
Clare	Benoit Comeau	Liberal	1967	
Colchester	G. I. Smith	Progressive Conservative	1949	
Colchester	Gerald Ritcey	Progressive Conservative	1968	
Cumberland East	Roger S. Bacon	Progressive Conservative	1970	
Cumberland West	D. L. George Henley	Progressive Conservative	1963	
Cumberland Centre	Raymond M. Smith	Progressive Conservative	1968	
Dartmouth North	Glen M. Bagnell	Liberal	1970	
Dartmouth South	D. Scott MacNutt	Liberal	1970	
Digby	Joseph H. Casey	Liberal	1970	
Guysborough	Angus MacIsaac	Progressive Conservative	1969	
Guysborough	A. M. Cameron (1973)	Liberal	1973	
Halifax Atlantic	John Buchanan	Progressive Conservative	1967	
Halifax Cornwallis	George M. Mitchell	Liberal	1970	speaker Minister of Development (1973)
Halifax Citadel	Ronald Wallace	Liberal	1970	
Halifax Chebucto	James L. Connolly	Liberal	1970	speaker (1973)
Halifax Cobequid	George Riley	Liberal	1970	
Halifax Eastern Shore	Alexander Garnet Brown	Liberal	1969	
Halifax Needham	Gerald Regan	Liberal	1967	Premier
Halifax St. Margarets	Leonard L. Pace	Liberal	1970	
Hants East	Jack Hawkins	Liberal	1970	
Hants West	Robert D. Lindsay	Liberal	1970	
Inverness	Norman J. MacLean	Progressive Conservative	1963	
Inverness	John Archie MacKenzie	Liberal	1970	
Kings North	Victor Thorpe	Progressive Conservative	1967	
Kings South	Harry How	Progressive Conservative	1970	
Kings West	Gordon Tidman	Progressive Conservative	1967	
Kings West	Frank Bezanson (1971)	Liberal	1971	
Lunenburg Centre	Walton Cook	Liberal	1970	
Lunenburg East	Maurice L. Zinck	Progressive Conservative	1959	
Lunenburg West	Maurice DeLory	Liberal	1970	
Pictou East	A. Lloyd MacDonald	Liberal	1963, 1970	
Pictou West	Harvey Veniot	Progressive Conservative	1956	
Pictou Centre	Ralph F. Fiske	Liberal	1970	
Queens	W. S. Kennedy Jones	Progressive Conservative	1953	
Queens	Floyd MacDonald (1971)	Progressive Conservative	1971	
Richmond	Gerald Doucet	Progressive Conservative	1963	
Shelburne	Harold Huskilson	Liberal	1970	
Victoria	Fisher Hudson	Progressive Conservative	1967	
Yarmouth	Fraser Mooney	Liberal	1970	
Yarmouth	George A. Snow	Progressive Conservative	1963	

== Former members of the 50th General Assembly ==
Name	Party	Electoral District	Cause of departure	Succeeded by	Elected
Gordon A. Tidman	Progressive Conservative	Kings West	seat declared vacant	Frank Bezanson, Liberal	November 16, 1971
W. S. Kennedy Jones	Progressive Conservative	Queens	resigned	Floyd MacDonald, PC	November 16, 1971
Angus MacIsaac	Progressive Conservative	Guysborough	ran for federal seat	A. M. Cameron, Liberal	June 5, 1973

Preceded by 49th General Assembly of Nova Scotia	General Assemblies of Nova Scotia; 1970–1974	Succeeded by 51st General Assembly of Nova Scotia
