= Matthew Farrell =

Matthew Farrell may refer to:

== People ==
- Matthew Farrell, pseudonym of writer Stephen Leigh
- Matt Farrell (born 1996), American basketball player

== Fictional characters ==
- Matthew Farrell, character in Live Free or Die Hard
- Matthew Farrell, character in The Black Donnellys

== See also ==
- Edward Matthew Farrell, Canadian senator
