= Kerry Morash =

Canadian politician

The Honourable Kerry Morash ECNS

Member of the Nova Scotia House of Assembly for Queens
- In office July 27, 1999 – June 13, 2006
- Preceded by: John Leefe
- Succeeded by: Vicki Conrad

Personal details
- Born: Liverpool, Nova Scotia
- Party: Progressive Conservative

Kerry Morash is a Canadian former safety co-ordinator and political figure in Nova Scotia.

== Early life and education ==
He was born in Liverpool, Nova Scotia, and was educated at Acadia University.

== Provincial politics ==
He represented Queens in the Nova Scotia House of Assembly from 1999 to 2006 as a Progressive Conservative member.

He served as Environment and Labour Minister in the government of Rodney MacDonald. Though the programs did not begin on his watch, independent auditors GPI Atlantic praised the solid waste recycling programs in the province. The extension of this to e-waste occurred largely during Morash's term.

Morash served in the province's Executive Council as Minister of Environment and Labour and Minister of Economic Development. He was defeated by New Democrat Vicki Conrad when he ran for reelection in 2006. In 2007, he was named to the National Round Table on the Environment and Economy, later disbanded by the same Harper government. Morash sought election again in the 2009 election, but lost to Conrad by a larger margin. In 2013, Morash was a candidate for the Progressive Conservative nomination in Queens-Shelburne, but was defeated.

== Federal politics ==
In January 2015, Morash announced he was entering the Conservative Party of Canada nomination race for the new South Shore—St. Margaret's district long held by the retiring Gerald Keddy. In April 2015, Morash was defeated in his bid for the nomination by Richard Clark.
