= McClearn =

McClearn is a surname. Notable people with the surname include:

- Gerald E. McClearn (1927–2017), American behavior geneticist
- Matthew McClearn (1802–1865), Nova Scotia merchant, ship owner, and politician

== See also ==
- McClean
- McCleary
