= George Spurr McClearn =

Canadian politician from Nova Scotia (1873–1952)

Member of the Nova Scotia House of Assembly for Queens County
- In office July 27, 1920 – June 24, 1925

Personal details
- Born: August 28, 1873 Liverpool, Nova Scotia
- Died: March 11, 1952 (aged 78) Liverpool, Nova Scotia
- Party: Liberal
- Spouse: May Winnifred Davison
- Relations: Matthew McClearn (grandfather)
- Occupation: merchant, politician

George Spurr McClearn (August 28, 1873 – March 11, 1952) was a merchant and political figure in Nova Scotia, Canada. He represented Queens County in the Nova Scotia House of Assembly from 1920 to 1925 as a Liberal member.

McClearn was born in 1873 at Liverpool, Nova Scotia to Captain John D. McClearn and Anna M. Spurr, and was a grandson of Matthew McClearn. He married May Winnifred Davison, daughter of Charles Henry Davison, on January 25, 1905. He served as mayor of Liverpool for four years. McClearn died in 1952 at Liverpool.

He was elected in the 1920 Nova Scotia general election but was unsuccessful in the 1925 Nova Scotia general election.
