= 26th Nova Scotia general election =

The 26th Nova Scotia general election may refer to

- the 1874 Nova Scotia general election, the 25th overall general election for Nova Scotia, for the (due to a counting error in 1859) 26th General Assembly of Nova Scotia,
- the 1878 Nova Scotia general election, the 26th overall general election for Nova Scotia, for the 27th General Assembly of Nova Scotia, but considered the 4th general election for the Canadian province of Nova Scotia, or
- the 1967 Nova Scotia general election, the 48th overall general election for Nova Scotia, for the 49th Legislative Assembly of Nova Scotia, but considered the 26th general election for the Canadian province of Nova Scotia.
