= Seth M. Bartling =

Canadian politician

MLA for Queens
- In office 1933–1937
- Preceded by: William Lorimer Hall; Donald W. MacKay
- Succeeded by: John J. Cameron

Personal details
- Born: July 12, 1886 Liverpool, Nova Scotia
- Died: September 13, 1954 (aged 68) Liverpool, Nova Scotia
- Party: Conservative
- Occupation: insurance broker

Seth M. Bartling (July 12, 1886 – September 13, 1954) was a Canadian politician. He represented the electoral district of Queens in the Nova Scotia House of Assembly from 1933 to 1937. He was a member of the Conservative Party of Nova Scotia.

Bartling was born in 1886 at Liverpool, Nova Scotia. He married Margaret Day in 1907, and was an insurance broker by career. Bartling was the town clerk for Liverpool from 1918 to 1939, and also served as stipendiary magistrate. Bartling entered provincial politics in the 1933 election, winning the Queens riding by 103 votes. He did not reoffer in the 1937 election. Bartling died at Liverpool on September 13, 1954.
