= Arthur Williams McCurdy =

Canadian businessman, inventor and astronomer

Arthur Williams McCurdy (April 13, 1856 – 1923) was a Canadian businessman, inventor and astronomer.

He was born in Truro, Nova Scotia, the son of David McCurdy and Mary Archibald. He moved to Baddeck, where his father took over the store established by his son-in-law Angus Tupper, with his family at the age of nine and was educated there and at Whitby, Ontario. He returned to Baddeck, where he entered business with his father and brother William. In 1881, he married Lucy O'Brien. The following year, he bought his father's share in the business. The business failed in 1887 and McCurdy became private secretary to Alexander Graham Bell, who he had met in Baddeck. In 1889, he became an assistant in Bell's lab in Washington, D.C..

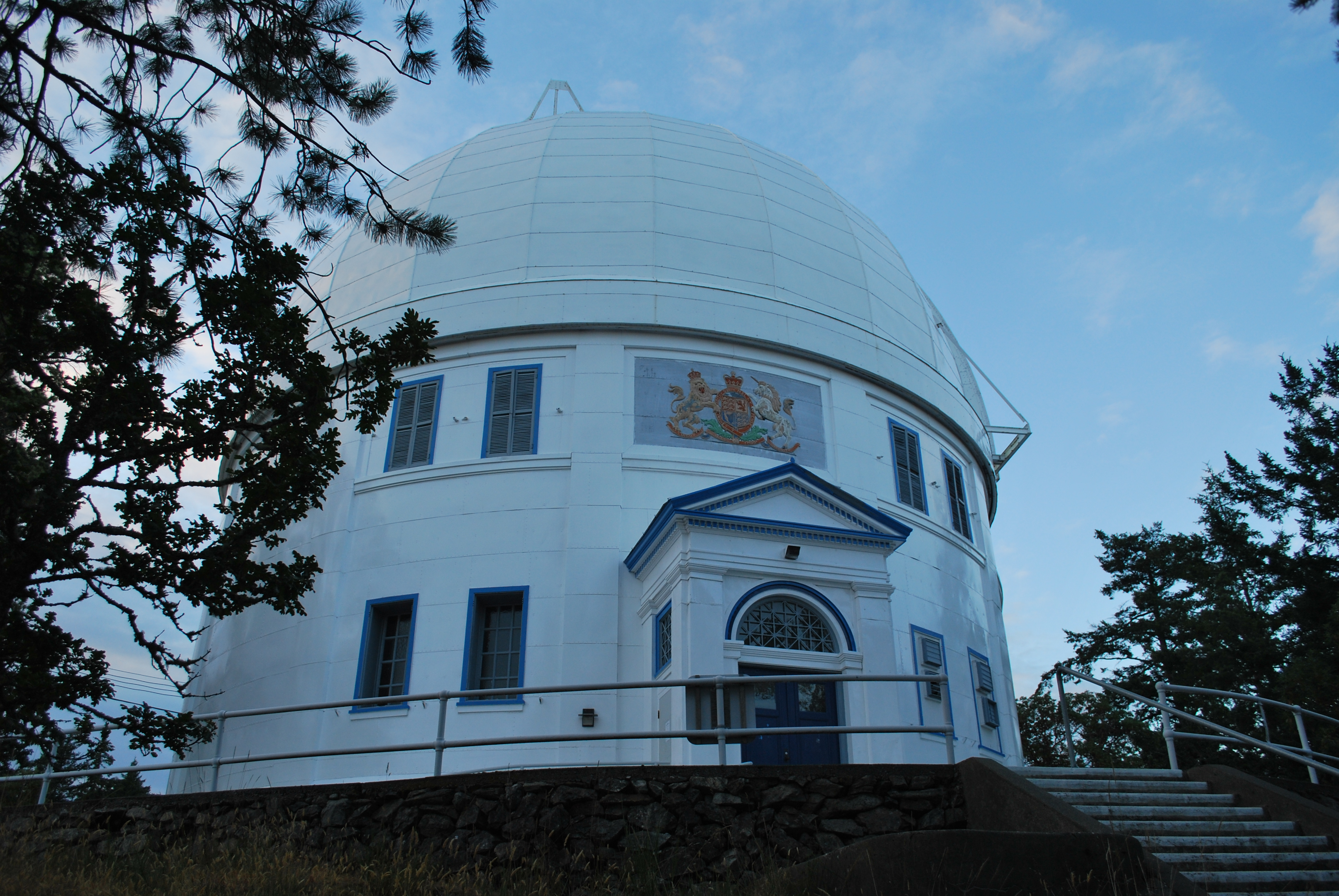
Dominion astrophysical observatory

In 1899, he developed a portable tank for developing film, later selling the patent to Eastman Kodak. He married Hattie Maria Mace in 1902 after the death of his first wife. After leaving Bell's employ to pursue his own inventions, McCurdy moved to Toronto in 1903. A few years later, he moved to Victoria, British Columbia. He was president of the British Columbia Natural History Society and contributed an article about Victoria to the National Geographic Magazine. McCurdy helped establish the Victoria centre of the Royal Astronomical Society of Canada and served as its vice-president; McCurdy lobbied for the establishment of the Dominion Dominion Astrophysical Observatory on Vancouver Island, for a brief time the site of the largest telescope in the world. In 1916, he ran for the Esquimalt seat in the Legislative Assembly of British Columbia; although he was at first declared elected, Robert Henry Pooley was declared elected after a recount. McCurdy died of heart failure in Washington, D.C.

He was the father of the pioneering aviator John Alexander Douglas McCurdy.
