= Vicki Conrad =

Canadian politician

MLA for Queens
- In office June 13, 2006 – October 8, 2013
- Preceded by: Kerry Morash
- Succeeded by: riding dissolved

Personal details
- Party: NDP

Vicki Conrad is a Canadian politician and former member of the Nova Scotia House of Assembly, representing the riding of Queens for the Nova Scotia New Democratic Party. She was first elected in the 2006 election.

In June 2009, Conrad was appointed Ministerial Assistant for the Department of Transportation and Infrastructure Renewal.

Prior to June 2009, she was the critic for Transportation and Public Works.

On April 26, 2013, Conrad announced that she would not be reoffering in the next election in 2013.
