= Harry Dennis Madden =

Canadian politician

MLA for Queens
- In office 1941–1945
- Preceded by: John J. Cameron
- Succeeded by: Merrill D. Rawding

Personal details
- Born: January 23, 1895 Amherst, Nova Scotia
- Died: November 28, 1945 (aged 50) Liverpool, Nova Scotia
- Party: Nova Scotia Liberal Party
- Occupation: druggist

Harry Dennis Madden (January 23, 1895 – November 28, 1945) was a Canadian politician. He represented the electoral district of Queens in the Nova Scotia House of Assembly from 1941 to 1945. He was a member of the Nova Scotia Liberal Party.

== Life ==
Madden was born in 1895 at Amherst, Nova Scotia. He was educated at St. Francis Xavier University and Dalhousie University, and was a druggist by career. He married Marion Campbell in 1924. Madden served as mayor of Liverpool for four years. Madden entered provincial politics in the 1941 election, defeating Conservative incumbent John J. Cameron by 13 votes in the Queens riding. He did not reoffer in the 1945 election. Madden died at Liverpool on November 28, 1945.
