= John Leefe =

Canadian politician (1942–2022)

The Honourable John Leefe ECNS

Mayor of Region of Queens Municipality, Nova Scotia
- In office 2000–2012
- Preceded by: Christopher Clarke
- Succeeded by: Christopher Clarke

MLA for Queens
- In office September 19, 1978 – July 27, 1999
- Preceded by: John Wickwire
- Succeeded by: Kerry Morash

Personal details
- Born: March 21, 1942 Saint John, New Brunswick
- Died: June 25, 2022 (aged 80)
- Party: Progressive Conservative
- Occupation: teacher

John Gordon Leefe (March 21, 1942 – June 25, 2022) was a Canadian author, educator and political figure in Nova Scotia, Canada. He represented Queens in the Nova Scotia House of Assembly from 1978 to 1999 as a Progressive Conservative member. He was also mayor of Region of Queens Municipality 2000-2012.

== Early life and education ==
He was born in Saint John, New Brunswick, the son of James G. Leefe CD (Canadian Forces' Decoration) and Helen G. Sancton, and was educated at University of King's College (BA), the University of New Brunswick (BEd) and Dalhousie University (MA). Leefe taught school in Saint John, Halifax and Liverpool, NS where he was Head of the Social Studies Department and later Assistant Director of Curriculum with the Queens District School Board.

== Political career ==
First elected in 1978, he served on the province's Executive Council of Nova Scotia (ECNS) as Minister of Fisheries from 1983 to 1989, Minister of the Environment from 1989 to 1992 and Minister of Natural Resources from 1992 to 1993. Leefe also served as Government House Leader 1991-1993. While a member of Her Majesty's Loyal Opposition he served as Chair of the Public Accounts Committee of the Legislature. During his time in the Legislature and municipal government, he was a strong advocate for setting aside lands for preservation and the protection of species-at-risk and played a pivotal role in the creation of Thomas Raddall Provincial Park, Kejimkujik Seaside (Parks Canada) and nomination of Shelburne River as a Canadian Heritage River. He retired from provincial politics in 1999.

He was elected Mayor of the Region of Queens Municipality in 2000 and re-elected in 2004 and 2008. For 2010-2012 he was elected to the Board of Directors of the Union of Nova Scotia Municipalities. He has served as President of the Canadian Council Ministers of the Environment, on the National and Provincial Round Tables on the Environment and Economy and in 2011 was appointed to the Nova Scotia Round Table on the Environment and Sustainable Prosperity. In March 2014 he was appointed Transition Co-ordinator by the provincial government to oversee the dissolution of Springhill and its merger into Cumberland Municipality. In October 2015 he was similarly appointed for the dissolution of Parrsboro and its merger with Cumberland. He served on the Board of the Queens Refugee Care Committee 2016-2018. In 2019 he was elected a warden of the Anglican Parish of South Queens,

== Awards and honours ==
In February 2012 Leefe was appointed Honorary Colonel of the West Nova Scotia Regiment. Leefe is the recipient of the Canada 125, Queen's Golden Jubilee and Queens Diamond Jubilee decorations. In 2002 he was granted the degree of Doctor of Civil Law by the University of King's College. Leefe was formerly a member of the Board of Governors of the University of King's College. In 2010 the Tourism Industry of Nova Scotia presented Leefe with the Ambassador Award for support of the tourism industry.

== Personal life and death ==
Leefe was married to the former Nancy Morrison. They had two children, Philip and Sarah and five grandchildren. He died on June 25, 2022, at the age of 80.

== Writing career ==
Leefe is the author of several articles written for professional and trade publications and of the following books:

- Atlantic Privateers (1978)
- Kejimkujik National Park (1981) - co-author with James Morrison, Millie Evans, Eric Mullen
- A History of Early Nova Scotia (1983) - co-author with Peter L. McCreath
