= John J. Cameron =

Canadian politician

MLA for Queens
- In office 1937–1941
- Preceded by: Seth M. Bartling
- Succeeded by: Harry Dennis Madden

Personal details
- Born: December 13, 1876 Heatherton, Nova Scotia
- Died: August 18, 1957 (aged 80) Liverpool, Nova Scotia
- Party: Conservative
- Occupation: lawyer

John Joseph Cameron (December 13, 1876 – August 18, 1957) was a Canadian politician. He represented the electoral district of Queens in the Nova Scotia House of Assembly from 1937 to 1941. He was a member of the Conservative Party of Nova Scotia.

Cameron was born in 1876 at Heatherton, Antigonish County, Nova Scotia. He was educated at St. Francis Xavier University and Dalhousie Law School, and was a lawyer by career. He married Joanne Edgar in 1918. He was the stipendiary magistrate and town solicitor of Liverpool from 1926 to 1957. Cameron entered provincial politics in the 1937 election, winning the Queens riding by 216 votes. He was defeated when he ran for re-election in 1941, losing to Liberal Harry Dennis Madden by 13 votes. Cameron died at Liverpool on August 18, 1957.
