= Merrill D. Rawding =

Canadian politician

MLA for Queens
- In office 1945–1953
- Preceded by: Harry Dennis Madden
- Succeeded by: W. S. Kennedy Jones

Personal details
- Born: May 8, 1905 East Jordan, Nova Scotia
- Died: June 13, 2004 (aged 99)
- Party: Nova Scotia Liberal Party

Merrill Denzil Rawding (May 8, 1905 – June 13, 2004) was a Canadian politician. He represented the electoral district of Queens in the Nova Scotia House of Assembly from 1945 to 1953. He was a member of the Nova Scotia Liberal Party.

Born in 1905 at East Jordan, Nova Scotia, Rawding was the son of Thomas Melbourne and Sara Jane Whitman (Cameron) Rawding. He married Elizabeth Spurr. He entered provincial politics in the 1945 election, winning the Queens riding by 341 votes. In July 1947, Rawding was appointed to the Executive Council of Nova Scotia as Minister of Highways and Public Works. He was re-elected in the 1949 election. Rawding was defeated by Progressive Conservative W. S. Kennedy Jones when he ran for re-election in 1953. Rawding ran again in the 1956 election, but Jones was re-elected by 93 votes. Rawding died on June 13, 2004.
