= John Wickwire =

Canadian politician

MLA for Queens
- In office 1974–1978
- Preceded by: Floyd MacDonald
- Succeeded by: John Leefe

Personal details
- Born: December 21, 1899 Milford, Nova Scotia
- Died: August 20, 1994 (aged 94) Liverpool, Nova Scotia
- Party: Progressive Conservative
- Occupation: physician, cardiologist

John Cox Wickwire (December 21, 1899 – August 20, 1994) was a Canadian politician. He represented the electoral district of Queens in the Nova Scotia House of Assembly from 1974 to 1978. He was a member of the Progressive Conservative Party of Nova Scotia.

Born in 1899 at Milford, Nova Scotia, Wickwire was a graduate of Dalhousie University, and Harvard Medical School. He married Dorothy Charlotte Fraser in 1929. Dr. John C. Wickwire Academy in Liverpool, Nova Scotia is named in his honour.

A member of Liverpool Town Council for five years, Wickwire entered provincial politics in the 1974 election, winning the Queens riding by 256 votes. He served one term, and did not reoffer in the 1978 election. Wickwire died on August 20, 1994, in Liverpool.
