= Richard Hunt (Nova Scotia politician) =

Canadian politician

Richard Hunt (December 15, 1832 – September 8, 1915) was a farmer, merchant and political figure in Nova Scotia, Canada. He represented Queens County in the Nova Scotia House of Assembly from 1890 to 1897 as a Liberal member.

He was born in Westfield, Queens County, Nova Scotia, the son of Ephraim Hunt and Olivia Smith. In 1856, he married Mary Morse. He died in South Brookfield at the age of 82.
