= Isaac N. Mack =

Canadian politician (1838–1925)

Isaac Newton Mack

MLA for Queen's County
- In office 1874–1878

Speaker of the Nova Scotia House of Assembly
- In office 1877–1878
- Preceded by: Mather Byles DesBrisay
- Succeeded by: Ebenezer Tilton Moseley

Personal details
- Born: September 1, 1838 Mill Village, Nova Scotia
- Died: June 3, 1925 (aged 86)
- Party: Liberal
- Occupation: merchant

Isaac Newton Mack (September 1, 1838 – June 3, 1925) was a merchant and political figure in Nova Scotia, Canada. He represented Queen's County in the Nova Scotia House of Assembly from 1874 to 1878 as a Liberal member.

He was born in Mill Village, Nova Scotia, of United Empire Loyalist descent, and was educated there and at Sackville. In 1872, he married Rachel Vaughan. Mack was chosen as speaker for the provincial assembly in 1877.
