= W. S. Kennedy Jones =

Canadian politician and lawyer

MLA for Queens
- In office 1953–1971
- Preceded by: Merrill D. Rawding
- Succeeded by: Floyd MacDonald

Speaker of the Nova Scotia House of Assembly
- In office 1957–1960
- Preceded by: John Smith MacIvor
- Succeeded by: Harvey Veniot

Personal details
- Born: July 24, 1919 Sault Ste. Marie, Ontario
- Died: June 5, 1978 (aged 58) Halifax, Nova Scotia
- Party: Progressive Conservative
- Occupation: lawyer

Walter Selby Kennedy Jones (July 24, 1919 – June 5, 1978) was a lawyer and political figure in Nova Scotia. He represented Queens in the Nova Scotia House of Assembly from 1953 to 1971 as a Progressive Conservative member.

He was born in Sault Ste. Marie, Ontario, the son of Charles H. L. Jones and Elizabeth Kennedy, and was educated at King's College and Dalhousie University. In 1942, he married Anne Seaborne. He was named Speaker of the House of Assembly of Nova Scotia in 1957. Jones served in the Executive Council of Nova Scotia as Minister of Public Welfare, Provincial Secretary, Minister of Trade and Industry, Minister of Finance, and Minister of Municipal Affairs. He died in 1978.
