= Frederick Andrew Laurence =

Canadian politician (1843–1912)

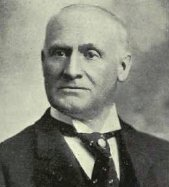

Member of the Canadian Parliament for Colchester
- In office 1904–1907
- Preceded by: Seymour Eugene Gourley
- Succeeded by: John Stanfield

MLA for Colchester County
- In office 1886–1904

Speaker of the Nova Scotia House of Assembly
- In office 1903–1904
- Preceded by: Thomas Robertson
- Succeeded by: Edward Matthew Farrell
- In office 1894–1901
- Preceded by: Michael Joseph Power
- Succeeded by: Thomas Robertson

Personal details
- Born: April 23, 1843 Port Hood, Nova Scotia
- Died: February 13, 1912 (aged 68)
- Party: Nova Scotia Liberal Party
- Other political affiliations: Liberal

Frederick Andrew Laurence (April 23, 1843 – February 13, 1912) was a Canadian politician.

Born in Port Hood, Nova Scotia, Laurence was educated at the Provincial Normal School of Nova Scotia and at Dalhousie University. A lawyer, he ran unsuccessfully as the Liberal candidate for the House of Commons of Canada for the electoral district of Colchester in the 1882 federal election. He was elected to the Nova Scotia House of Assembly for Colchester in 1886 and was re-elected in 1890, 1894, 1897 and 1901. A Nova Scotia Liberal, he was Speaker of the House of Assembly from 1895 to 1901 and from 1903 to 1904. He was elected to the Canadian House of Commons in the 1904 federal election. He resigned in 1907 when he was appointed a judge.

== Electoral record ==
1904 Canadian federal election: Colchester
Party	Candidate	Votes	%	±%
Liberal	Frederick Andrew Laurence	2,610	51.90	+4.92
Conservative	Seymour Eugene Gourley	2,419	48.10	-4.92
Total valid votes		5,029	–	
Source: Library of Parliament

Political offices
Preceded by Michael Joseph Power	Speaker of the House of Assembly; 1895–1901	Succeeded by Thomas Robertson
Preceded by Thomas Robertson	Speaker of the House of Assembly; 1903–1904	Succeeded by Edward Matthew Farrell
