= Floyd MacDonald =

Canadian politician (1934–2023)

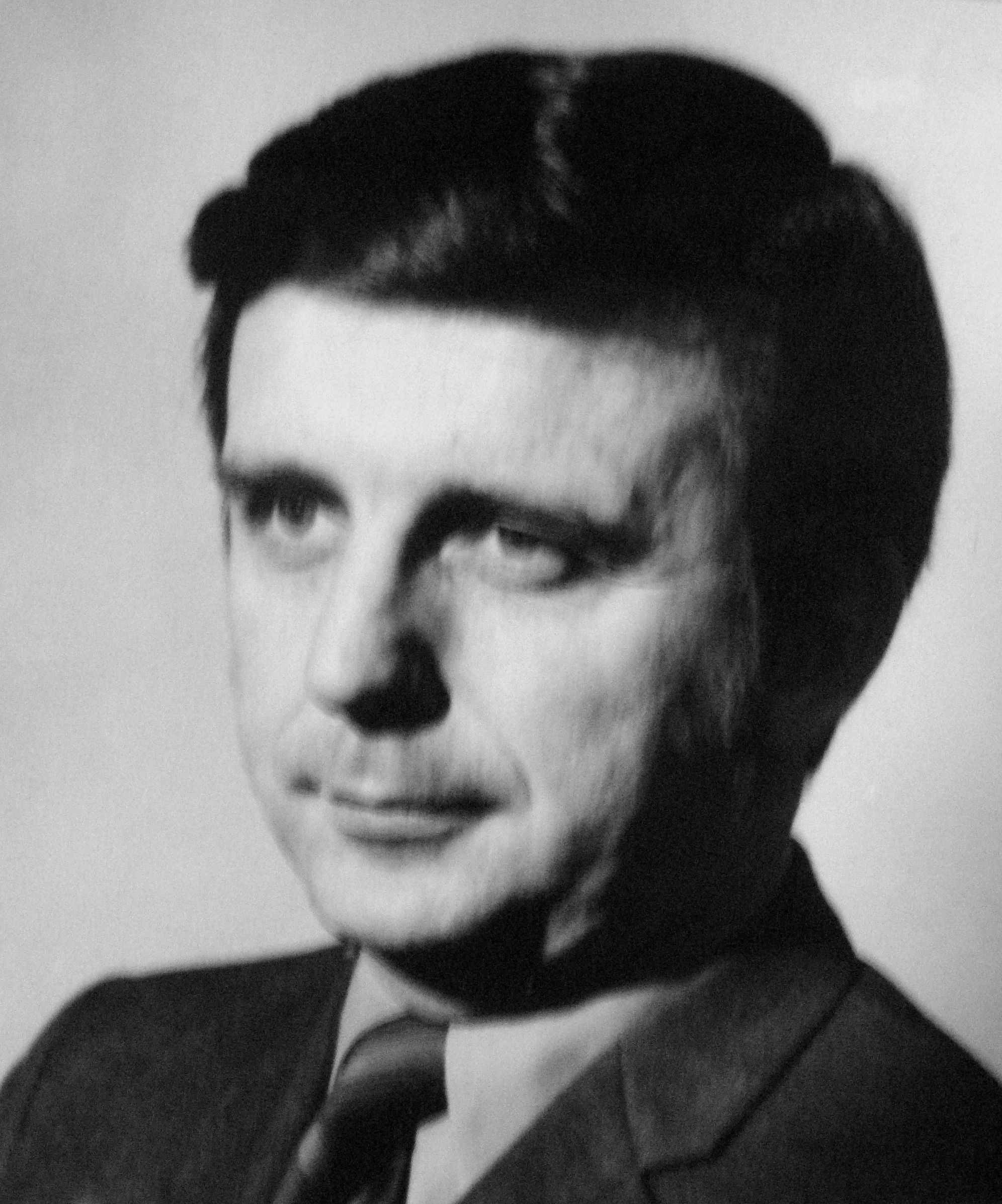
- MacDonald, c. 1973

MLA for Queens
- In office November 1971 – 1974
- Preceded by: W. S. Kennedy Jones
- Succeeded by: John Wickwire

Personal details
- Born: November 6, 1934 Fredericton Junction, New Brunswick, Canada
- Died: April 15, 2023 (aged 88) Hartland, New Brunswick, Canada
- Party: Progressive Conservative
- Occupation: physician

Floyd Duncan MacDonald (November 6, 1934 – April 15, 2023) was a Canadian doctor and politician. He represented the electoral district of Queens in the Nova Scotia House of Assembly from 1971 to 1974. He was a member of the Nova Scotia Progressive Conservative Party.

== Life and career ==
MacDonald was born at Fredericton Junction, New Brunswick on November 6, 1934. He attended Acadia University and Dalhousie University, earning a M.D. degree from the latter. He resides in Hartland, New Brunswick.

MacDonald entered provincial politics in November 1971, winning a byelection for the Queens riding by 808 votes. He served one term and did not reoffer in the 1974 election.

MacDonald died in Hartland, New Brunswick on April 15, 2023, at the age of 88.
