= Charlie Bartling =

Australian rules footballer

Personal information
- Full name: Charles Frederick Ernest Bartling
- Born: 3 June 1912; Northcote, Victoria
- Died: 30 January 1998 (aged 85); Chelsea, Victoria
- Original team: Aspendale / St Kilda Reserves
- Height: 183 cm (6 ft 0 in)
- Weight: 76 kg (168 lb)

Playing career^{1}
Years	Club	Games (Goals)
1935–1936	North Melbourne	13 (1)
1937	Fitzroy	2 (0)
Total		15 (1)
- ^{1} Playing statistics correct to the end of 1937.

Charles Frederick Ernest Bartling (3 June 1912 – 30 January 1998) was an Australian rules footballer who played with North Melbourne and Fitzroy in the Victorian Football League (VFL).

He later served in the Australian Army in World War II, spending a year in New Guinea before fracturing his wrist and being declared unfit for rifle duty. He was discharged in November 1945.
