= Queens-Shelburne (provincial electoral district) =

Nova Scotia electoral district

Defunct provincial electoral district
- Legislature: Nova Scotia House of Assembly
- District created: 2012
- District abolished: 2021
- Last contested: 2017

Demographics
- Population (2016): 17,479
- Electors (2017): 14,099
- Area (km²): 4,518.00
- Census division(s): Shelburne County, Queens County
- Census subdivision(s): The Town of Lockeport, Town of Shelburne, Municipality of the District of Shelburne, Region of Queens Municipality

Queens-Shelburne was a provincial electoral district in Nova Scotia, Canada, that elects one member of the Nova Scotia House of Assembly. The riding was created in 2012 with 89 per cent of the former district of Queens, 46 per cent of the former district of Shelburne and 1 per cent of the former district of Digby-Annapolis. It consists of the towns of Lockeport and Shelburne, the Municipality of the District of Shelburne, and the Region of Queens Municipality.

== Members of the Legislative Assembly ==
This riding has elected the following members of the Legislative Assembly:

Queens-Shelburne
| Legislature | Years | Member | Party |
|---|---|---|---|
| 62nd | 2013–2017 | Sterling Belliveau | New Democratic |
| 63rd | 2017–2021 | Kim Masland | Progressive Conservative |

== Election results ==
=== 2017 ===
2017 Nova Scotia general election
| Party | Candidate | Votes | % | ±% |
|---|---|---|---|---|
| Progressive Conservative | Kim Masland | 3,244 | 43.82 | +11.33 |
| Liberal | Vernon Oickle | 2,303 | 31.11 | +3.25 |
| New Democratic | John Davis | 1,581 | 21.36 | -15.74 |
| Green | Kathleen Milan | 275 | 3.71 | +1.16 |
| Total valid votes | | 7,403 | 100 | |
| Total rejected ballots | | 25 | 0.34 | -0.31 |
| Turnout | | 7,428 | 53.20 | -6.78 |
| Eligible voters | | 13,961 | | |
| Progressive Conservative gain from New Democratic | | Swing | | +4.04 |
Source: Elections Nova Scotia

=== 2013 ===
2013 Nova Scotia general election
| Party | Candidate | Votes | % |
|---|---|---|---|
| New Democratic | Sterling Belliveau | 3,066 | 37.10 |
| Progressive Conservative | Bruce Inglis | 2,685 | 32.49 |
| Liberal | Benson Frail | 2,302 | 27.86 |
| Green | Madeleine Taylor | 211 | 2.55 |
| Total valid votes | | 8,264 | 100.0 |
| Total rejected ballots | | 54 | 0.65 |
| Turnout | | 8,318 | 59.98 |
| Eligible voters | | 13,868 | |
Source: Elections Nova Scotia
