= John B. North =

Canadian politician

John Burton North (November 2, 1825 – February 27, 1907) was a shipbuilder and political figure in Nova Scotia, Canada. He represented Kings County in the Nova Scotia House of Assembly from 1874 to 1878 as an independent member.

He was born in Cornwallis, Nova Scotia. In 1855, he married Elizabeth Esther Ells. He built 54 ships between 1853 and 1904. He died in Hantsport, Nova Scotia at the age of 81.
