= Albert M. Hemeon =

Canadian politician

Albert M. Hemeon (1843 – April 26, 1896) was a merchant and political figure in Nova Scotia, Canada. He represented Queen's County in the Nova Scotia House of Assembly from 1887 to 1896 as a Liberal member.

He was born in Shelburne, Nova Scotia, of United Empire Loyalist descent, and educated at Truro. In 1864, he married L.W. McVicar. Hemeon was a school trustee, a justice of the peace and warden for Queen's County. He was first elected in an 1887 by-election held after Jason M. Mack resigned his seat. Hemeon died in office.
