= Matthew McClearn =

Canadian merchant and politician

Matthew McClearn (April 8, 1802 – January 18, 1865) was a merchant, ship owner and politician in Nova Scotia. He represented Liverpool township in the Nova Scotia House of Assembly from 1855 to 1859.

He was born in Port Mouton, Nova Scotia, the son of Robert McClearn and Sarah West. McClearn captained ships in the trade with the West Indies for his uncle Joseph Freeman. In 1830, he married Sophia Darrow. He acquired his own schooner in 1843 and used it to transport goods between Liverpool, Nova Scotia and Halifax. He died of yellow fever in Tobago.
