= Frank J.D. Barnjum =

Canadian politician and merchant

Frank John Dixie Barnjum (April 26, 1858 – February 18, 1933) was a merchant and political figure in Nova Scotia, Canada. He represented Queens County in the Nova Scotia House of Assembly from 1925 to 1926 as a Conservative member.

== Biography ==
Barnjum was born in Montreal, Canada East, the son of Francis Barnum and Leonora Pryor. Barnjum married Bertha L. Clement. He was extensively involved in lumbering in Nova Scotia and became a millionaire. Barnjum, a proponent of forest conservation and reforestation known as the "Canadian Forestry Crusader", opposed the export of pulpwood to the United States. However, an embargo on exports of pulpwood would also benefit Barnjum's business interests. He helped have Otto Schierbeck named as Nova Scotia's first Chief Forester in 1926; in 1923, Barnjum had hired Schierbeck as forester for his own timber holdings in Nova Scotia. Barnjum resigned his seat in the provincial assembly in 1926 because he had made a campaign promise to have a paper mill built on the Mersey River; however, it was built by others first. In 1932, he purchased one of the last remaining large stands of virgin timber on Vancouver Island to preserve it for future generations. Barnjum died in Paris at the age of 74 during a visit to Europe to study forest conservation; he was buried in Lynnfield, Massachusetts.
