= Hiram Black =

Canadian politician (1837–1897)

Hiram Black (October 9, 1837 – October 19, 1897) was a political figure in Nova Scotia, Canada. He represented Cumberland County in the Nova Scotia House of Assembly from 1874 to 1878 as an independent member supporting the Liberal Conservatives.

He was born in Amherst, Nova Scotia, the son of Joshua Black and Amy Bent, and was educated at Mount Allison Academy. He was a prominent member in the local chapter of the Sons of Temperance. In 1874, he married Libbie Smith. Black served as a member of the province's Board of Agriculture. In 1879, he was named to the province's Legislative Council. He died in Amherst at the age of 60.

His son Percy Chapman served in the province's assembly and the Canadian House of Commons.
