= David McCurdy =

Canadian politician

David McCurdy (July 29, 1810 – June 10, 1905) was a merchant and political figure in Nova Scotia, Canada. He represented Victoria County in the Nova Scotia House of Assembly from 1873 to 1878 as a Liberal member.

He was born in Onslow, Nova Scotia, the son of James McCurdy and Agnes Archibald. His mother was the daughter of Matthew Archibald, who had earlier served in the provincial assembly. McCurdy married Mary Archibald in 1832. He moved to Baddeck in 1865. McCurdy ran unsuccessfully for a seat in the provincial assembly in 1871 and was then elected in an 1873 by-election held after Charles James Campbell was named to the Legislative Council. He was elected again in the general election that followed in 1874. In 1878, McCurdy was named to the province's Legislative Council. He died in Baddeck at the age of 94.

His son William also served in the provincial assembly and his son Arthur became an inventor and astronomer.
