= Edward Matthew Farrell =

Canadian politician (1854–1931)

The Honourable Edward Matthew Farrell

Senator for Liverpool, Nova Scotia
- In office January 12, 1910 – August 6, 1931
- Appointed by: Wilfrid Laurier

Speaker of the House of Assembly of Nova Scotia
- In office February 9, 1905 – January 10, 1910
- Preceded by: Frederick Andrew Laurence
- Succeeded by: James F. Ellis

Member of the Nova Scotia House of Assembly for Queen's County
- In office August 15, 1896 – January 10, 1910

Personal details
- Born: March 31, 1854 Liverpool, Nova Scotia
- Died: August 6, 1931 (aged 77)
- Party: Liberal
- Occupation: Printer, publisher

Edward Matthew Farrell (March 31, 1854 – August 6, 1931) was a Canadian printer, publisher, and politician from the province of Nova Scotia.

Born in Liverpool, Nova Scotia, the son of Patrick Farrell and Mary Ann (Shea) Farrell, Farrell was educated in public schools in Liverpool. From 1888 to 1896, he was the Chief Deputy Sheriff in Queens County, Nova Scotia. In 1896, he was acclaimed to the Nova Scotia House of Assembly for the electoral district of Queen's County. A Nova Scotia Liberal, he was re-elected in 1897, 1901, and 1906. From 1905 to 1910, he was the Speaker of the House of Assembly of Nova Scotia. A Roman Catholic, he was summoned to the Senate of Canada on the advice of Prime Minister Wilfrid Laurier for the senatorial division of Liverpool, Nova Scotia. A Liberal, he served until his death in 1931.
