= William Lorimer Hall =

Canadian politician (1876–1958)

- Born: 1876; Melvern Square, Nova Scotia
- Died: 1958 (aged 81–82); Halifax, Nova Scotia
- Education: Acadia University (B.A., 1898); Dalhousie University (LL.B., 1900)
- Occupations: Lawyer, politician, judge.
- Years active: 1900–1958
- Relatives: Robert Stanfield (son-in-law)

William Lorimer Hall (July 28, 1876 – May 26, 1958) was a lawyer, judge and political figure in Nova Scotia, Canada.

== Early life and education ==
He was born in Melvern Square, Nova Scotia, the son of Reverend William Hall and Margaret Barss. Hall was educated at Acadia University and Dalhousie University.

== Career ==
He was called to the Nova Scotia bar in 1900 and set up practice in Halifax.

He presided over Viola Desmond's appeal. He represented Queen's County in the Nova Scotia House of Assembly as a Conservative member from 1910 to 1920 and from 1925 to 1931.

He served as Attorney General in the province's Executive Council from 1926 to 1931. In 1931, Hall was named a judge in the Supreme Court of Nova Scotia. He served on the bench until his death in Halifax.

== Family ==
In 1907, Hall married Edith Hamm.

His daughter Mary married Robert Stanfield, the 17th Premier of Nova Scotia.
