= James S. MacDonald =

Canadian politician

James Stainforth MacDonald (October 3, 1839 – after 1882) was a political figure in Nova Scotia, Canada. He represented Kings County in the Nova Scotia House of Assembly from 1878 to 1882 as a Liberal-Conservative member.

He was born at East Point, Prince Edward Island and educated on Prince Edward Island. McDonald married Alice Sarah Young in 1870. He served as a member of Nova Scotia's Executive Council from 1878 to 1882. He lived in Horton (later Wolfville).
