= Henry M. Munro =

Canadian politician

- Born: May 17, 1840; Kings County, Nova Scotia, Canada
- Died: December 28, 1915 (aged 75); Kingston Station, Annapolis County, Nova Scotia, Canada
- Occupations: farmer, politician
- Years active: 1882–1886
- Known for: represented Annapolis County in the Nova Scotia House of Assembly
- Political party: Nova Scotia Liberal Party
- Spouses: Margaret Spinney (m. 1868)

Henry M. Munro (May 17, 1840 – December 28, 1915) was a farmer and political figure in Nova Scotia, Canada. He represented Annapolis County in the Nova Scotia House of Assembly from 1882 to 1886 as a Liberal member.

He was born in Kings County, Nova Scotia and was self-educated. In 1868, he married Margaret Spinney. Munro was principal of a public school for five years. Munro died at Kingston Station in Annapolis County, Nova Scotia.
