= Alexander McCuish =

Canadian politician

MLA for Richmond County
- In office 1878–1882

Personal details
- Born: January 3, 1843 Loch Lomond, Nova Scotia
- Died: July 1, 1919 (aged 76) Arichat, Nova Scotia
- Party: Conservative Party of Nova Scotia

Alexander McCuish (January 3, 1843 – July 1, 1919) was a merchant and political figure in Nova Scotia, Canada. He represented Richmond County in the Nova Scotia House of Assembly as a Conservative member from 1878 to 1882.

He was born in Loch Lomond, Nova Scotia, the son of Archibald McCuish and Jane McDonald, both Scottish immigrants. He first farmed and was involved in mining before establishing himself in business, mainly trading in fishing supplies. McCuish was a justice of the peace. In 1872, he married Jessie Ann McPhee. McCuish was a member of the Freemasons. He died in 1919.
