= Benjamin Van Blarcom =

Canadian politician

Benjamin Weatherspoon Van Blarcom (April 4, 1823 – c. 1901) was a manufacturer and political figure in Nova Scotia, Canada. He represented Digby County in the Nova Scotia House of Assembly from 1878 to 1882.

He was born in Granville, Nova Scotia, the son of Martin Van Blarcom and Sarah Leonard. Van Blarcom married Catherine Nickerson. He was involved in the production of shingles. Van Blarcom served as a justice of the peace. He was sheriff for Digby County from 1882 to 1886. He lived in Brighton.
