= Edward Farrell (physician) =

Canadian politician

Edward Farrell (September 25, 1842 – January 1, 1901) was a physician and political figure in Nova Scotia, Canada. He represented Halifax County from 1874 to 1878 as a Liberal member.

He was born in Dartmouth, Nova Scotia, the son of Dominick Farrell, an Irish immigrant, and Mary Gorman. He was educated at Saint Mary's College and received his M.D. from the College of Physicians and Surgeons in New York City. He worked at Bellevue Hospital for two years before returning to set up practice in Halifax. He was professor of surgery at Dalhousie College and then the Halifax Medical College. Farrell also served as surgeon at the Provincial and City Hospital, physician at the Halifax Visiting Dispensary, coroner for Halifax County and a member of the provincial Board of Health. In 1870, he married Mary Walsh. He served in the province's Executive Council as minister without portfolio. He ran unsuccessfully for a federal seat in 1891 and 1892. Farrell died in Halifax of pneumonia at the age of 58.
