= William Botsford Troop =

Canadian politician

William Botsford Troop (April 13, 1824 – c. 1905) was a merchant, ship owner and political figure in Nova Scotia. He represented Annapolis County in the Nova Scotia House of Assembly from 1874 to 1882 as a Conservative member.

He was born in Granville, Nova Scotia, the son of Israel Troop and a descendant of Amos Botsford. In 1872, Troop married Elizabeth Ann Magee. He was named to the province's Executive Council in 1878.
