= Joseph William Hadley =

Canadian politician

Joseph William Hadley (November 27, 1819 – November 24, 1898) was a merchant, ship's captain and political figure in Nova Scotia, Canada. He represented Guysborough County in the Nova Scotia House of Assembly from 1878 to 1882.

He was born in Manchester, Nova Scotia, the son of William Hadley and Sarah Hart. Hadley was in command of a ship involved in the coastal trade for more than 30 years. In 1844, he married Isabella Logan Harty. He was named a magistrate in 1857. Hadley ran unsuccessfully for a seat in the provincial assembly in 1871 and 1874 before he was elected in 1878. He was a freemason. Hadley died in Guysborough at the age of 78.
