= Ebenezer Tilton Moseley =

Canadian politician (1844–1989)

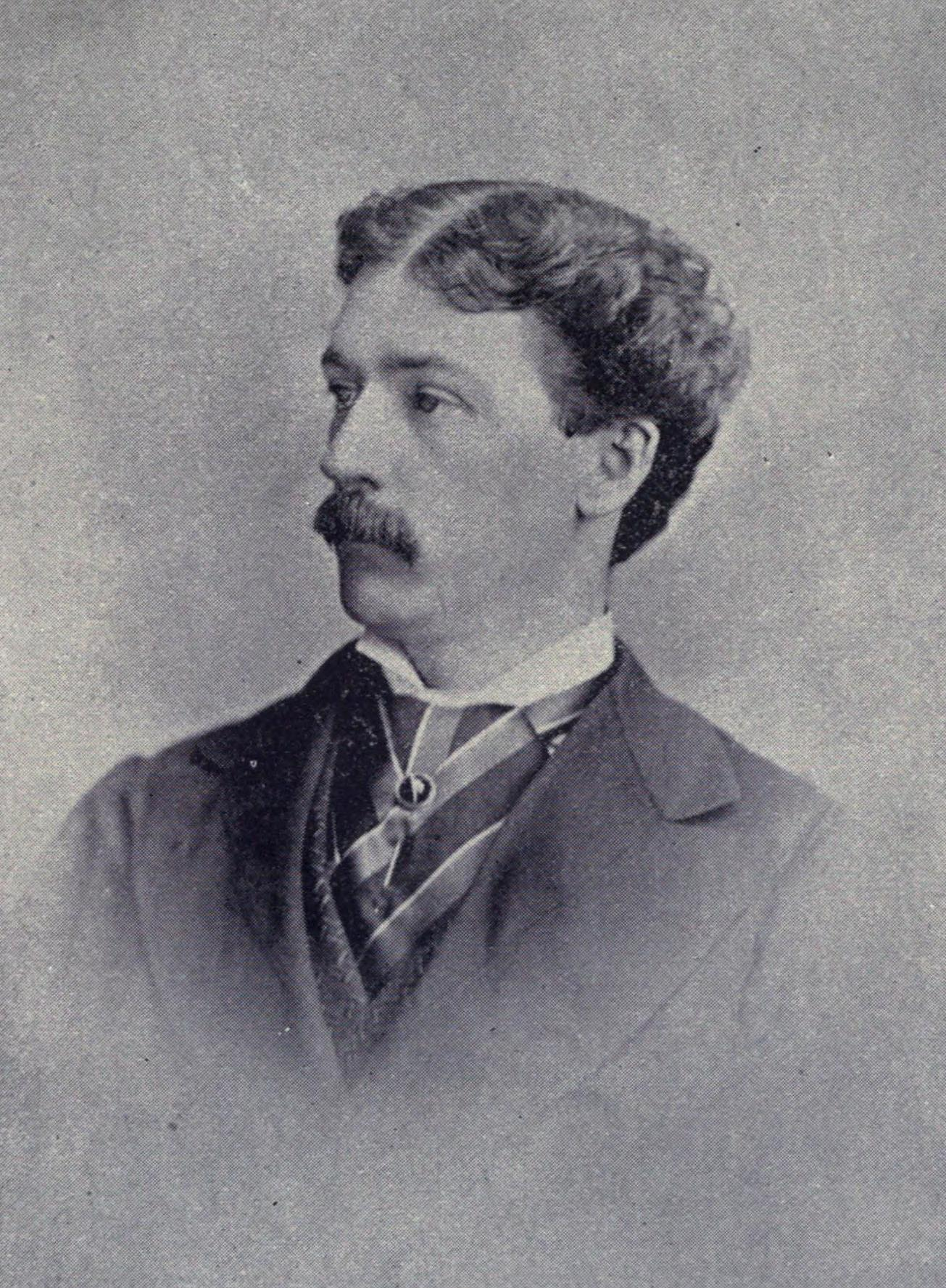
- Ebenezer Tilton Moseley c. 1896

MLA for Cape Breton County
- In office 1874–1882

Speaker of the Nova Scotia House of Assembly
- In office 1878–1882
- Preceded by: Isaac N. Mack
- Succeeded by: Angus McGillivray

Personal details
- Born: June 2, 1844 Halifax, Nova Scotia
- Died: June 18, 1898 (aged 54) Sydney, Nova Scotia
- Party: Liberal-Conservative
- Occupation: lawyer

Ebenezer Tilton Moseley (June 2, 1844 – June 18, 1898) was a lawyer and political figure in Nova Scotia, Canada. He represented Cape Breton County in the Nova Scotia House of Assembly from 1874 to 1882 as a Liberal-Conservative member.

He was born in Halifax, the son of Ebenezer Moseley and Anne Jane Cummings. He was educated at St. John and Dalhousie colleges, was admitted to the bar in 1868 and set up practice in Sydney. Moseley married Isabel Brookman. He served as a member of the municipal council, also serving as mayor of Sydney, and as commissioner of schools for the county. He was chosen as speaker for the provincial assembly in 1878. Moseley was defeated when he ran for reelection in 1882. He ran unsuccessfully for a seat in the House of Commons in 1887. Moseley died in Sydney at the age of 54.
