= Charles A. Smith (Canadian politician) =

Canadian politician

Charles Arnold Smith (born May 18, 1845 – October 1905) was a merchant and political figure in Nova Scotia, Canada. He represented Lunenburg County in the Nova Scotia House of Assembly from 1878 to 1882 as a Liberal-Conservative member.

He was born in Chester, Nova Scotia. In 1870, Smith married Eleanor Campbell. He lived in Chester. He was named a sub-collector of customs in 1887.

He died in October 1905.
