= Joseph H. Cook =

Canadian politician

Joseph Henry Cook (November 11, 1829 – March 7, 1921) was a merchant and political figure in Nova Scotia, Canada. He represented Queen's County in the Nova Scotia House of Assembly from 1882 to 1890 as a Liberal member.

He was born in Guysborough County, Nova Scotia, the son of Benjamin Cook and Lucy Maria Cameron, and was educated in Queens County. Cook was a justice of the peace, a member of the county council and a captain in the militia. He married Sophia Freeman in 1853. He died in Milton, Nova Scotia.
