= John S. McNeill =

Canadian politician

John Sears McNeill (June 15, 1829 – October 9, 1924) was a merchant and political figure in Nova Scotia, Canada. He represented Digby County in the Nova Scotia House of Assembly from 1882 to 1890 as a Liberal member.

He was born in St. Mary's Bay, Digby County, Nova Scotia, the son of John McNeill and Freelove Sabean, and was educated there. In 1852, he married Mary Eliza Thomas. Munro married Alice Maria Jones in 1870 after the death of his first wife. He was a justice of the peace, a stipendiary magistrate, town clerk for Weymouth and county treasurer. McNeill died in Barton, Digby County, Nova Scotia at the age of 95.
