= William F. McCurdy =

Canadian politician

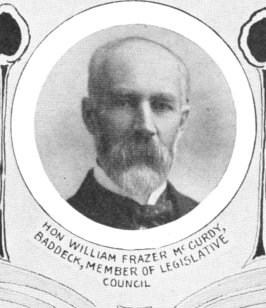
William Fraser McCurdy

William Fraser McCurdy (December 5, 1844 – June 5, 1923) was a merchant and political figure in Nova Scotia, Canada. He represented Victoria County in the Nova Scotia House of Assembly from 1878 to 1886 as a Liberal member.

He was born in Onslow, Nova Scotia, the son of David McCurdy, a member of the province's Legislative Council, and Mary Archibald. McCurdy was educated in Truro. In 1877, he married Mary Randick. McCurdy lived in Baddeck. He founded the Victoria Gypsum Mining and Manufacturing Company and served as its president and general manager.

His brother Arthur was a Canadian inventor and astronomer.
