= Michael Joseph Power =

Canadian politician (1834–1895)

MLA for Halifax County
- In office 1882–1894

Speaker of the Nova Scotia House of Assembly
- In office 1886–1894
- Preceded by: Angus McGillivray
- Succeeded by: Frederick Andrew Laurence

Personal details
- Born: February 23, 1834 Halifax, Nova Scotia
- Died: January 11, 1895 (aged 60)
- Party: Liberal
- Occupation: businessman

Michael Joseph Power (February 23, 1834 – January 11, 1895) was a businessman and political figure in Nova Scotia, Canada. He represented Halifax County in the Nova Scotia House of Assembly from 1882 to 1894 as a Liberal member.

He was born in Halifax, Nova Scotia, the son of Michael Power and Anne Lonergan. After studying at the Union Academy in Halifax, he apprenticed as a printer with the Acadian Recorder. Power worked in Boston for a time before returning to Halifax. In 1860, he married Ann Sophia Kent. He opened a liquor retail business and then was a grocer. Power was a captain in the militia and served as a member of the Halifax city council and chairman of the board of works. He ran unsuccessfully for a seat in the provincial assembly in 1878. Power served as speaker for the provincial assembly from 1887 to 1894. He was defeated when he ran for reelection in 1894. Power died in Halifax at the age of 60 after suffering from Bright's disease for some time.
