= Leander Ford =

Canadian politician

Leander Starr Ford (December 25, 1836 – May 19, 1905) was a carriage manufacturer and political figure in Nova Scotia, Canada. He represented Queen's County in the Nova Scotia House of Assembly from 1878 to 1882 as a Liberal-Conservative member.

He was born in Milton, Nova Scotia and educated there. In 1860, he married Mary Ellen Freeman. Ford was major in the Queen's County militia. He later served as fisheries inspector for the province.
