= Nathaniel Spence =

Canadian politician

Nathaniel David Spence (January 1, 1834 – February 6, 1914) was a farmer and political figure in Nova Scotia, Canada. He represented Hants County in the Nova Scotia House of Assembly from 1878 to 1886 as a Conservative member.

He was born in Saint Croix, Nova Scotia, the son of Andrew Inglis Spence also born in Saint Croix, Nova Scotia (whose father William Spence was born in Aberdeenshire, Scotland) and Margaret Smith. He was the second of eight children - Ann (29/02/1832), Patience (14/04/1836), Susan (18/04/1841), Emily (10/01/1844), Robie James Rae (10/08/1847), Ernest (about 1850) and Cecilea (10/06/1851). On September 29, 1859, he married Mary Ann Cochrane. Together they had nine children, James Cochrane (10/07/1860), David Nathaniel (18/04/1862), Andrew Herbert (9/9/1864), Robie Edward (19/02/1867), William Arthur (5/10/1869), Maurice Grant (4/3/1872), Ernest Allison (9/6/1874), George Marshall (9/6/1877), and Mabel Susan (12/03/1880). Spence was also involved in the trade in lumber. He died in Saint Croix.
