= William Blair (Nova Scotia politician) =

Canadian politician

MLA for Colchester County
- In office 1878 to 1886

Personal details
- Born: May 25, 1836 Onslow, Nova Scotia
- Died: June 17, 1919 (aged 83) Windsor, Nova Scotia
- Party: Liberal-Conservative

William M. Blair (May 25, 1836 – June 17, 1919) was a farmer and political figure in Nova Scotia, Canada. He represented Colchester County in the Nova Scotia House of Assembly from 1878 to 1886 as a Liberal-Conservative member.

He was born in Onslow, Nova Scotia and educated there. In 1864, he married Harriet Blair. He was lieutenant-colonel in the militia, commanding a Highlanders battalion from Pictou, Hants and Colchester. Blair was an ardent promoter of modern farming, and was deeply involved in agricultural reform efforts in Nova Scotia. He was president of the Onslow Agricultural Society and chairman of the Agricultural Exhibition Committee, was a prominent member of the Nova Scotia Farmers' Association from its inception in 1895 until his death, and participated in lobbying the provincial government for the creation of a provincial School of Agriculture in 1885 (which became the Nova Scotia Agricultural College in 1905). Most substantively, Blair was the first supervisor of the federally funded Experimental Farm in Nappan, Nova Scotia, heading it from its creation in 1887 until his retirement in 1896. He died in 1919.

His son was William Saxby Blair who followed in his father's footsteps in agricultural promotion, being the first supervisor of the Experimental Farm in Kentville, Nova Scotia from its creation in 1912 until his retirement in 1938.
