= William F. MacCoy =

Canadian politician

William Frederick MacCoy, KC (May 15, 1840 – December 17, 1914) was an Irish-born lawyer and political figure in Nova Scotia, Canada. He represented Shelburne County in the Nova Scotia House of Assembly from 1882 to 1890 as a Liberal member.

He was born in Lysrian, County Longford and came to Nova Scotia at the age of eight. McCoy was educated at the Sackville Academy. He was called to the bar in 1864. In 1868, he married Maude L. Woodill. He ran unsuccessfully for a seat in the provincial assembly in 1878. In 1881, McCoy was named Queen's Counsel. In the same year, he was elected an alderman for the City of Halifax. McCoy also served as a recorder for the town of Shelburne and a captain in the militia. He died in Brighton, England at the age of 74.
