= John A. Fraser (politician) =

Canadian politician

John A. Fraser (November 6, 1840 – May 4, 1908) was a political figure in Nova Scotia. He represented Victoria County in the Nova Scotia House of Assembly from 1874 to 1878 and from 1886 to 1894 as a Liberal member.

He was born on Boularderie Island, Nova Scotia, the only surviving son of the Reverend James Fraser, a missionary for the Church of Scotland. Fraser was educated in Halifax. He was postmaster for Big Bras D'Or and served as a member of the municipal council. In 1865, he married Frances Helen Plant. Fraser did not run for reelection in 1878 and 1882.
