= Isidore LeBlanc =

Canadian politician

Isidore LeBlanc (November 30, 1837 – June 26, 1919) was a merchant and political figure in Nova Scotia, Canada. He represented Richmond County in the Nova Scotia House of Assembly from 1878 to 1886 as a Liberal member.

He was born in Arichat, Nova Scotia, of Acadian origin, and educated there. LeBlanc married Seraphine Babin on January 9, 1860 at Notre Dame de L'Assomption Church in Arichat. He was a ship broker, a notary public and an insurance agent. He ran unsuccessfully for a seat in the provincial assembly in 1871. In 1883, LeBlanc was named to the province's Executive Council.
