= Murdoch McRae =

Canadian politician

Murdoch McRae (November 4, 1846 – March 9, 1909) was a merchant and political figure in Nova Scotia, Canada. He represented Richmond County in the Nova Scotia House of Assembly from 1871 to 1878 and from 1882 to 1886 as a Liberal-Conservative member.

He was born in Nest Bay, Richmond County, Nova Scotia, the son of Donald McRae, and educated there. In 1872, he married Mary Euphemia McDougall. McRae served as a member of the county council. He supported the development of a railroad for Cape Breton Island from Canso to Louisbourg. In 1886, he was employed by the federal Post Office Department. He died in St. Peter's, Nova Scotia.
