= Angus McGillivray =

Canadian politician (1842–1917)

MLA for Antigonish County
- In office 1876–1891
- Preceded by: Daniel MacDonald
- Succeeded by: Christopher P. Chisholm
- In office 1895–1902
- Preceded by: Colin Francis McIsaac
- Succeeded by: Fred Robert Trotter

Speaker of the Nova Scotia House of Assembly
- In office 1882–1886
- Preceded by: Ebenezer Tilton Moseley
- Succeeded by: Michael Joseph Power

Personal details
- Born: January 22, 1842 Bailey's Brook, Nova Scotia
- Died: May 4, 1917 (aged 75)
- Party: Liberal
- Occupation: lawyer

Angus McGillivray (January 22, 1842 – May 4, 1917) was a lawyer and political figure in Nova Scotia, Canada. He represented Antigonish County in the Nova Scotia House of Assembly as a Liberal member from 1878 to 1891 and from 1895 to 1902.

He was born in Bailey's Brook, Pictou County, Nova Scotia, the son of John McGillivray of Scottish descent, and moved to Antigonish with his parents while still young. He was educated at Saint Francis Xavier University. McGillivray was called to the Nova Scotia bar in 1874. In 1878, he married Maggie McIntosh. He served as speaker for the assembly from 1883 to 1886. McGillivray was defeated when he ran for election in 1894. He was elected in an 1895 by-election held after Colin Francis McIsaac was elected to the House of Commons. McGillivray ran unsuccessfully for a seat in the House of Commons in 1887 and 1891.
