= Otto Schwartz Weeks =

Canadian politician

Otto Schwartz Weeks, QC was a lawyer and political figure in Nova Scotia, Canada. He represented Guysborough County in the Nova Scotia House of Assembly from 1874 to 1878 and from 1882 to 1890 as a Liberal member.

== Early years ==
He was born in Halifax, Nova Scotia, the son of Otto Richard Schwartz Weeks and Maria Morris. He was admitted to the Nova Scotia bar in 1853, later setting up practice in Windsor.

== Career ==
He was first elected to the provincial assembly in an 1875 by-election, after having been selected as attorney general. Weeks was named Queen's Counsel in 1876. Later that year, he was dismissed from the province's Executive Council by an order in council after having been requested to resign. Weeks was defeated when he ran for reelection in 1878 and 1890, having lost the Liberal nomination but still choosing to run as a Liberal and diverting enough Liberal votes so that Conservatives were elected instead.

== Family ==
Weeks married Seraph Cutler Ruggles in 1865.

== Death ==
He died in Halifax.
