= James C. Bartling =

Canadian politician

James Christian Bartling (c. 1819 – February 28, 1906) was a ship's captain, merchant and political figure in Nova Scotia, Canada. He was born in Port Mouton, Nova Scotia, the son of James Christian Bartling and Mary Irwin. He married Elizabeth McClearn.

He represented Queens County in the Nova Scotia House of Assembly from 1878 to 1882 as a Liberal-Conservative member. Bartling died in Liverpool, Nova Scotia.
