= Henri M. Robicheau =

Canadian politician

Henri M. Robicheau (September 12, 1838 – May 4, 1923) was a farmer and political figure in Nova Scotia, Canada. He represented Digby County in the Nova Scotia House of Assembly from 1874 to 1890 as a Liberal member.

== Early life ==
He was born in Meteghan, Nova Scotia, the son of Bonaventure Robicheau, of Acadian origin, and Celeste Leblanc, and was educated in Clare.

== Career ==
He was involved in the lumber business. He served as a captain in the militia. In 1891, he was named to the province's Legislative Council.

== Death ==
Robicheau died in Maxwellton in Digby County, Nova Scotia.

== Personal life ==
In 1866, he married Madeline Leblanc in 1866. Robicheau married Chantal Robicheau in 1875 several months after the death of his first wife.
