= Jason M. Mack =

Canadian politician

Jason Miller Mack (March 17, 1843 – January 18, 1927) was a lawyer and political figure in Nova Scotia, Canada. He represented Queen's County in the Nova Scotia House of Assembly from 1882 to 1886 as a Liberal member.

He was born in Mill Village, Queens County, Nova Scotia, the son of Jason Mack and Augusta Miller of United Empire Loyalist descent, and was educated at King's College in Windsor. He was called to the bar in 1869. In 1878, he married Minnie Kellaher. Mack was the first warden for Queen's County. He served as stipendiary magistrate for the Liverpool police district. In 1889, he was named to the province's Legislative Council. He died in Liverpool.
