= 38th General Assembly of Nova Scotia =

The 38th General Assembly of Nova Scotia represented Nova Scotia between June 25, 1925, through September 5, 1928. The first session of this assembly was convened on February 9, 1926. There were three sessions of the assembly during this period.

The election of 1925 represented a shift in Nova Scotia politics as the 37th General Assembly would mark the return of the Conservatives to government after a forty-three year absence.

One of the most significant pieces of legislation to come out of this General Assembly is that of An Act Abolishing the Legislative Council and Amending the Constitution of the Province, in 1928. This act abolished the Legislative Council, the General Assembly's upper house. When Edgar Rhodes became premier in 1925, the Legislative Council had only one Conservative member and 17 Liberal members, with three vacancies; Rhodes ultimately had 15 new councillors appointed in order to pack the Council for means of abolition, while dismissing all but a handful of Liberal councillors.

== Division of seats ==
There were 42 members of this General Assembly, elected in the 1925 Nova Scotia general election.

Leader	Party	# of Seats
Edgar Nelson Rhodes	Liberal-Conservative	38
Ernest Howard Armstrong	Liberal	3
Archibald Terris	Labour-Conservative	1
Total		42

== List of members ==
Riding	Name	Party	First elected / previously elected	Position
Annapolis County	Obediah Parker Goucher	Conservative	1925	
Annapolis County	Harry Thompson MacKenzie	Conservative	1925	
Antigonish County	William Chisholm	Liberal	1916	
Antigonish County	John Laughlin McIsaac	Liberal	1925	
Cape Breton Centre	Gordon Sidney Harrington	Conservative	1925	Minister of Public Works & Mines
Cape Breton Centre	Joseph Macdonald	Conservative	1925	
Cape Breton East	John Carey Douglas	Conservative	1911, 1925	Attorney General (1925-6)
Cape Breton East	Alexander O'Handley	Conservative	1925	
Colchester County	William Boardman Armstrong	Conservative	1925	
Colchester County	Frank Stanfield	Conservative	1911, 1925	
Cumberland County	Percy Chapman Black	Conservative	1925	Minister of Highways
Cumberland County	Daniel George McKenzie	Conservative	1920	Speaker (1925-6)
Cumberland County	Archibald Terris	Labour	1920	
Digby County	William Hudson Farnham	Conservative	1925	
Digby County	John Louis Philip Robicheau	Conservative	1925	
Guysborough County	Simon Osborn Giffin	Conservative	1925	
Guysborough County	Howard Amos Rice	Conservative	1925	
Halifax County	Josiah Frederick Fraser	Conservative	1925	
Halifax County	Alexander Montgomerie	Conservative	1925	
Halifax County	John Francis Mahoney	Conservative	1925	
Halifax County	John Archibald Walker	Conservative	1925	Minister of Natural Resources & Provincial Development
Halifax County	William Drysdale Piercey	Conservative	1925	
Hants County	Albert E. Parsons	Conservative	1909, 1925	Speaker (1926-8)
Hants County	Edgar Nelson Rhodes	Conservative	1925	Provincial Secretary & Premier
Inverness County	Hubert Meen Aucoin	Conservative	1925	
Inverness County	Malcolm McKay	Conservative	1925	
Kings County	George Clyde Nowlan	Conservative	1925	
Kings County	Reginald Tucker Caldwell	Conservative	1925	
Lunenburg County	Wallace Norman Rehfuss	Conservative	1925	
Lunenburg County	William Haslam Smith	Conservative	1925	
Pictou County	John Doull	Conservative	1925	
Pictou County	Robert Albert Douglas	Conservative	1925	
Pictou County	Hugh Allan MacQuarrie	Conservative	1925	
Queens County	Frank J.D. Barnjum	Conservative	1925	
Queens County	William Lorimer Hall	Conservative	1910, 1925	Attorney General (1926–1928)
Richmond County & Cape Breton West	Benjamin Amedeé LeBlanc	Conservative	1916	
Richmond County & Cape Breton West	John Alexander MacDonald	Conservative	1916	
Richmond County & Cape Breton West	John Angus Stewart (1926)	Conservative	1926	
Shelburne County	Norman Emmons Smith	Conservative	1925	
Shelburne County	Ernest Reginald Nickerson	Conservative	1925	
Victoria County	Donald Buchanan McLeod	Liberal	1925	
Victoria County	Philip McLeod	Conservative	1914, 1925	
Yarmouth County	John Flint Cahan	Conservative	1925	
Yarmouth County	Raymond Neri d'Entremont	Conservative	1925	

== Former members of the 37th General Assembly ==
Name	Party	Electoral District	Cause of departure	Succeeded by	Elected
John Alexander MacDonald	Conservatives	Cape Breton West	resigned to run federally	John Angus Stewart, Con.	February 24, 1926
Frank J.D. Barnjum	Conservatives	Queens County	resigned March 16, 1926 (Note: Upon being nominated Barnjum promised a mill project for Queens County. By 1928 this had not happened and Barnjum resigned due to the failed promise.)	N/A	N/A
John Carey Douglas	Conservatives	Cape Breton East	resigned to run federally	N/A	N/A

== Notes ==
Preceded by 37th General Assembly of Nova Scotia	General Assemblies of Nova Scotia; 1925–1928	Succeeded by 39th General Assembly of Nova Scotia
