= Halifax (provincial electoral district) =

Former provincial electoral district in Nova Scotia, Canada

Coordinates: 44.649°N 63.605°W

Nova Scotia electoral district

Defunct provincial electoral district
- Legislature: Nova Scotia House of Assembly
- District created: 1867
- District abolished: 1933
- Last contested: 1928

Halifax was a provincial electoral district in Nova Scotia, Canada, that elected three, and then five members to the Nova Scotia House of Assembly. It existed from 1867 to 1933, at which point Halifax County was divided into five separate electoral districts: Halifax South, Halifax Centre, Halifax North, Halifax East, and Halifax West.

== Members of the Legislative Assembly ==
From 1867 to 1916, Halifax elected three members to the Legislative Assembly. From 1916 to 1933, it elected five members.

Halifax County elected the following members to the Legislative Assembly.

Legislature	Years	Member	Party	Member	Party
39th	1930–1933	George Henry Murphy	Liberal-Conservative	Angus MacDonald Morton	Liberal-Conservative
39th	1928–1930	John Francis Mahoney	Liberal-Conservative	Gordon B. Isnor	Liberal
39th	1928–1930	John Francis Mahoney	Liberal-Conservative	Edward Joseph Cragg	Liberal
39th	1928–1930	John Francis Mahoney	Liberal-Conservative	Josiah Frederick Fraser	Liberal-Conservative
38th	1925–1928	John Francis Mahoney	Liberal-Conservative	Josiah Frederick Fraser	Liberal-Conservative
38th	1925–1928	John Archibald Walker	Liberal-Conservative	William Drysdale Piercey	Liberal-Conservative
38th	1925–1928	John Archibald Walker	Liberal-Conservative	Alexander Montgomerie	Liberal-Conservative
37th	1923–1925	Walter J. A. O'Hearn	Liberal	John Brown Douglas	Liberal
37th	1920–1923	Robert Emmett Finn	Liberal	John Brown Douglas	Liberal
37th	1920–1923	Robert Emmett Finn	Liberal	Adam Dunlap Burris	Liberal
37th	1920–1923	Robert Emmett Finn	Liberal	Henry Gibson Bauld	Liberal
37th	1920–1923	Robert Emmett Finn	Liberal	John L. Connolly	Liberal
36th	1916–1920	Robert Emmett Finn	Liberal	John L. Connolly	Liberal
36th	1916–1920	Robert Emmett Finn	Liberal	Henry Gibson Bauld	Liberal
36th	1916–1920	Robert Emmett Finn	Liberal	Hector McInnes	Liberal-Conservative
36th	1916–1920	Robert Emmett Finn	Liberal	George Everett Faulkner	Liberal

Legislature	Years	Member	Party	Member	Party	Member	Party
35th	1911–1916	Robert Emmett Finn	Liberal	George Everett Faulkner	Liberal	Fulton Johnson Logan	Liberal
34th	1906–1911	Robert Emmett Finn	Liberal	George Everett Faulkner	Liberal	David McPherson	Liberal
33rd	1901–1906	Michael Edwin Keefe	Liberal	George Mitchell	Liberal	David McPherson	Liberal
32nd	1900–1901	Michael Edwin Keefe	Liberal	George Mitchell	Liberal	David McPherson	Liberal
32nd	1897–1900	William Bernard Wallace	Liberal	George Mitchell	Liberal	David McPherson	Liberal
31st	1896–1897	William Bernard Wallace	Liberal	William Anderson Black	Liberal-Conservative	William Roche	Liberal
31st	1894–1896	William Stevens Fielding	Liberal	William Anderson Black	Liberal-Conservative	William Roche	Liberal
30th	1890–1894	William Stevens Fielding	Liberal	Michael Joseph Power	Liberal	William Roche	Liberal
29th	1886–1890	William Stevens Fielding	Liberal	Michael Joseph Power	Liberal	William Roche	Liberal
28th	1882–1886	William Stevens Fielding	Liberal	Michael Joseph Power	Liberal	William D. Harrington	Liberal-Conservative
27th	1879–1882	John F. Stairs	Liberal-Conservative	John Pugh	Liberal-Conservative	William D. Harrington	Liberal-Conservative
27th	1878–1879	Charles J. Macdonald	Liberal-Conservative	John Pugh	Liberal-Conservative	William D. Harrington	Liberal-Conservative
26th	1874–1878	Philip Carteret Hill	Liberal	Edward Farrell	Liberal	Donald Archibald	Liberal
25th	1873–1874	John Taylor	Liberal	John Flinn	Liberal	Donald Archibald	Liberal
25th	1871–1873	William Garvie	Liberal	John Flinn	Liberal	Donald Archibald	Liberal
24th	1870–1871	Philip Carteret Hill	Confederation Party	James Cochran	Anti-Confederation Party	Henry Balcom	Anti-Confederation Party
24th	1867–1870	Jeremiah Northup	Anti-Confederation Party	James Cochran	Anti-Confederation Party	Henry Balcom	Anti-Confederation Party

== Election results ==
=== 1916–1933: five members ===
Nova Scotia provincial by-election, 1930-01-21
Party	Candidate	Votes	%	Elected
Liberal–Conservative	George Henry Murphy	17,954	58.33%	✓
Liberal	Robert Emmett Finn	12,826	41.67%	
Total		30,780	–	
Source(s) Source: Nova Scotia Legislature (2024). "Electoral History for Halifax County" (PDF). nslegislature.ca.

1928 Nova Scotia general election
Party	Candidate	Votes	%	Elected
Liberal–Conservative	John Francis Mahoney	11,589	10.41%	✓
Liberal	Gordon Benjamin Isnor	11,357	10.21%	✓
Liberal–Conservative	Josiah Frederick Fraser	11,298	10.15%	✓
Liberal–Conservative	Angus MacDonald Morton	11,273	10.13%	✓
Liberal	Edward Joseph Cragg	11,215	10.08%	✓
Liberal–Conservative	Frederick P. Bligh	11,082	9.96%	
Liberal–Conservative	John Archibald Walker	11,076	9.95%	
Liberal	Thomas J. Byrne	10,939	9.83%	
Liberal	Bernard W. Russell	10,855	9.76%	
Liberal	William J. Kennedy	10,591	9.52%	
Total		111,275	–	
Source(s) Source: Nova Scotia Legislature (2024). "Electoral History for Halifax County" (PDF). nslegislature.ca.

Nova Scotia provincial by-election, 1925-08-01
Party	Candidate	Votes	%	Elected
Liberal–Conservative	John Archibald Walker	acclaimed	N/A	✓
Total			–	
Source(s) Source: Nova Scotia Legislature (2024). "Electoral History for Halifax County" (PDF). nslegislature.ca.

1925 Nova Scotia general election
Party	Candidate	Votes	%	Elected
Liberal–Conservative	Josiah Frederick Fraser	15,985	13.23%	✓
Liberal–Conservative	Alexander Montgomerie	15,952	13.20%	✓
Liberal–Conservative	John Francis Mahoney	15,899	13.16%	✓
Liberal–Conservative	John Archibald Walker	15,679	12.97%	✓
Liberal–Conservative	William Drysdale Piercey	15,672	12.97%	✓
Liberal	John Murphy	8,291	6.86%	
Liberal	John G. MacDougall	8,256	6.83%	
Liberal	John Brown Douglas	7,905	6.54%	
Liberal	Henry Bauld	7,900	6.54%	
Liberal	Walter J. A. O'Hearn	7,872	6.51%	
Labour	Walter Mosher	571	0.47%	
Labour	Robert Daw	480	0.40%	
Labour	Alban L. Breen	392	0.32%	
Total		120,854	–	
Source(s) Source: Nova Scotia Legislature (2024). "Electoral History for Halifax County" (PDF). nslegislature.ca.

Nova Scotia provincial by-election, 1923-01-16
Party	Candidate	Votes	%	Elected
Liberal	Walter J. A. O'Hearn	acclaimed	N/A	✓
Total			–	
Source(s) Source: Nova Scotia Legislature (2024). "Electoral History for Halifax County" (PDF). nslegislature.ca.

1920 Nova Scotia general election
Party	Candidate	Votes	%	Elected
Liberal	Henry Bauld	6,554	10.01%	✓
Liberal	Robert Emmett Finn	6,285	9.60%	✓
Liberal	John Brown Douglas	6,057	9.25%	✓
Liberal	Adam Dunlap Burris	5,936	9.07%	✓
Liberal	John L. Connolly	5,817	8.89%	✓
Liberal–Conservative	John B. Archibald	4,045	6.18%	
Liberal–Conservative	Robert A. Brenton	3,860	5.90%	
Liberal–Conservative	Frederick W. Stevens	3,642	5.56%	
Liberal–Conservative	Francis A. Gillis	3,595	5.49%	
United Farmers	Joe Wallace	3,409	5.21%	
Labour	Ronald A. McDonald	3,369	5.15%	
Labour	Patrick J. Healy	3,336	5.07%	
Liberal–Conservative	Edward L. Power	3,236	4.94%	
United Farmers	Peter McN. Kuhn	3,165	4.83%	
Labour	Joseph H. McKenzie	3,157	4.23%	
Total		65,463	–	
Source(s) Source: Nova Scotia Legislature (2024). "Electoral History for Halifax County" (PDF). nslegislature.ca.

1916 Nova Scotia general election
Party	Candidate	Votes	%	Elected
Liberal	Henry Bauld	6,855	10.54%	✓
Liberal–Conservative	Hector McInnes	6,735	10.36%	✓
Liberal	Robert Emmett Finn	6,703	10.31%	✓
Liberal	George Everett Faulkner	6,606	10.16%	✓
Liberal	John L. Connolly	6,545	10.06%	✓
Liberal–Conservative	John W. Regan	6,387	9.82%	
Liberal–Conservative	Felix Patrick Quinn	6,370	9.79%	
Liberal	John Brown Douglas	6,359	9.78%	
Liberal–Conservative	E. F. Williams	6,266	9.63%	
Liberal–Conservative	Frederick P. Bligh	6,213	9.55%	
Total		65,039	–	
Source(s) Source: Nova Scotia Legislature (2024). "Electoral History for Halifax County" (PDF). nslegislature.ca.

=== 1867–1911: three members ===
1911 Nova Scotia general election
Party	Candidate	Votes	%	Elected
Liberal	Fulton Johnson Logan	6,142	17.74%	✓
Liberal	George Everett Faulkner	6,120	17.68%	✓
Liberal	Robert Emmett Finn	5,836	16.86%	✓
Liberal–Conservative	F. P. Bligh	5,187	14.98%	
Liberal–Conservative	Nelson R. Smith	4,825	13.94%	
Liberal–Conservative	J. C. O'Mullin	3,937	11.37%	
Labour	John T. Joy	2,575	7.44%	
Total		34,622	–	
Source(s) Source: Nova Scotia Legislature (2024). "Electoral History for Halifax County" (PDF). nslegislature.ca.

1906 Nova Scotia general election
Party	Candidate	Votes	%	Elected
Liberal	David McPherson	5,550	19.23%	✓
Liberal	George Everett Faulkner	5,475	18.97%	✓
Liberal	Robert Emmett Finn	5,372	18.62%	✓
Liberal–Conservative	G. M. Campbell	4,423	15.33%	
Liberal–Conservative	W. M. Sedgewick	4,093	14.18%	
Liberal–Conservative	W. F. O'Connor	3,943	13.66%	
Total		28,856	–	
Source(s) Source: Nova Scotia Legislature (2024). "Electoral History for Halifax County" (PDF). nslegislature.ca.

1901 Nova Scotia general election
Party	Candidate	Votes	%	Elected
Liberal	David McPherson	5,049	17.89%	✓
Liberal	George Mitchell	4,955	17.56%	✓
Liberal	Michael Edwin Keefe	4,840	17.15%	✓
Liberal–Conservative	Adam Brown Crosby	4,707	16.68%	
Liberal–Conservative	G. M. Campbell	4,487	15.90%	
Liberal–Conservative	J. J. Stewart	4,185	14.83%	
Total		28,223	–	
Source(s) Source: Nova Scotia Legislature (2024). "Electoral History for Halifax County" (PDF). nslegislature.ca.

Nova Scotia provincial by-election, 1900-12-12
Party	Candidate	Votes	%	Elected
Liberal	Michael Edwin Keefe	4,400	53.29%	✓
Liberal–Conservative	Adam Brown Crosby	3,856	46.71%	
Total		8,256	–	
Source(s) Source: Nova Scotia Legislature (2024). "Electoral History for Halifax County" (PDF). nslegislature.ca.

1897 Nova Scotia general election
Party	Candidate	Votes	%	Elected
Liberal	George Mitchell	5,312	18.08%	✓
Liberal	David McPherson	5,307	18.06%	✓
Liberal	William Bernard Wallace	5,101	17.36%	✓
Liberal–Conservative	Miner T. Foster	4,754	16.18%	
Liberal–Conservative	John Fitzwilliam Stairs	4,563	15.53%	
Liberal–Conservative	T. W. Walsh	4,350	14.80%	
Total		29,387	–	
Source(s) Source: Nova Scotia Legislature (2024). "Electoral History for Halifax County" (PDF). nslegislature.ca.

Nova Scotia provincial by-election, 1896-08-15
Party	Candidate	Votes	%	Elected
Liberal	William Bernard Wallace	acclaimed	N/A	✓
Total			–	
Source(s) Source: Nova Scotia Legislature (2024). "Electoral History for Halifax County" (PDF). nslegislature.ca.

1894 Nova Scotia general election
Party	Candidate	Votes	%	Elected
Liberal	William Stevens Fielding	4,795	17.88%	✓
Liberal	William Roche	4,651	17.35%	✓
Liberal–Conservative	William Anderson Black	4,570	17.04%	✓
Liberal–Conservative	James Morrow	4,406	16.43%	
Liberal	Michael Joseph Power	4,373	16.31%	
Liberal–Conservative	T. W. Walsh	4,019	14.99%	
Total		26,814	–	
Source(s) Source: Nova Scotia Legislature (2024). "Electoral History for Halifax County" (PDF). nslegislature.ca.

1890 Nova Scotia general election
Party	Candidate	Votes	%	Elected
Liberal	William Stevens Fielding	5,036	18.86%	✓
Liberal	William Roche	4,828	18.08%	✓
Liberal	Michael Joseph Power	4,752	17.79%	✓
Liberal–Conservative	H. McD Henry	4,219	15.80%	
Liberal–Conservative	P O'Mullin	3,946	14.77%	
Liberal–Conservative	J. J. Stewart	3,928	14.71%	
Total		26,709	–	
Source(s) Source: Nova Scotia Legislature (2024). "Electoral History for Halifax County" (PDF). nslegislature.ca.

1886 Nova Scotia general election
Party	Candidate	Votes	%	Elected
Liberal	William Stevens Fielding	4,042	19.76%	✓
Liberal	William Roche	3,931	19.21%	✓
Liberal	Michael Joseph Power	3,822	18.68%	✓
Liberal–Conservative	William D. Harrington	2,981	14.57%	
Liberal–Conservative	J. N. Lyons	2,866	14.01%	
Liberal–Conservative	John Young Payzant	2,816	13.76%	
Total		20,458	–	
Source(s) Source: Nova Scotia Legislature (2024). "Electoral History for Halifax County" (PDF). nslegislature.ca.

Nova Scotia provincial by-election, 1884-08-20
Party	Candidate	Votes	%	Elected
Liberal	William Stevens Fielding	2,355	50.42%	✓
Liberal–Conservative	John Young Payzant	2,316	49.58%	
Total		4,671	–	
Source(s) Source: Nova Scotia Legislature (2024). "Electoral History for Halifax County" (PDF). nslegislature.ca.

1882 Nova Scotia general election
Party	Candidate	Votes	%	Elected
Liberal–Conservative	William D. Harrington	2,737	17.76%	✓
Liberal	Michael Joseph Power	2,591	16.82%	✓
Liberal	William Stevens Fielding	2,554	16.58%	✓
Liberal	J. G. Foster	2,543	16.50%	
Liberal–Conservative	John Pugh	2,508	16.28%	
Liberal–Conservative	J. F. L. Parsons	2,475	16.06%	
Total		15,408	–	
Source(s) Source: Nova Scotia Legislature (2024). "Electoral History for Halifax County" (PDF). nslegislature.ca.

Nova Scotia provincial by-election, 1879-11-25
Party	Candidate	Votes	%	Elected
Liberal–Conservative	John Fitzwilliam Stairs	2,414	54.71%	✓
Liberal	Donald Archibald	1,998	45.29%	
Total		4,412	–	
Source(s) Source: Nova Scotia Legislature (2024). "Electoral History for Halifax County" (PDF). nslegislature.ca.

1878 Nova Scotia general election
Party	Candidate	Votes	%	Elected
Liberal–Conservative	Charles James MacDonald	3,375	18.55%	✓
Liberal–Conservative	William D. Harrington	3,353	18.43%	✓
Liberal–Conservative	John Pugh	3,135	17.23%	✓
Liberal	Philip Carteret Hill	2,866	15.76%	
Liberal	Michael Joseph Power	2,739	15.06%	
Liberal	Donald Archibald	2,722	14.96%	
Total		18,190	–	
Source(s) Source: Nova Scotia Legislature (2024). "Electoral History for Halifax County" (PDF). nslegislature.ca.

1874 Nova Scotia general election
Party	Candidate	Votes	%	Elected
Liberal	Philip Carteret Hill	2,862	20.88%	✓
Liberal	Donald Archibald	2,853	20.81%	✓
Liberal	Edward Farrell	2,709	19.76%	✓
Liberal–Conservative	Robert Sedgewick	1,837	13.40%	
Liberal–Conservative	William Johnston Almon	1,818	13.26%	
Liberal–Conservative	M. J. Griffin	1,630	11.89%	
Total		13,709	–	
Source(s) Source: Nova Scotia Legislature (2024). "Electoral History for Halifax County" (PDF). nslegislature.ca.

Nova Scotia provincial by-election, 1873-02-11
Party	Candidate	Votes	%	Elected
Liberal	John Taylor	2,142	74.79%	✓
Independent	Robert Motton	722	25.21%	
Total		2,864	–	
Source(s) Source: Nova Scotia Legislature (2024). "Electoral History for Halifax County" (PDF). nslegislature.ca.

1871 Nova Scotia general election
Party	Candidate	Votes	%	Elected
Liberal	William Garvie	2,752	17.66%	✓
Liberal	John Flinn	2,704	17.35%	✓
Liberal	Donald Archibald	2,693	17.28%	✓
Liberal–Conservative	Philip Carteret Hill	2,497	16.02%	
Liberal–Conservative	Malachy Bowes Daly	2,492	15.99%	
Liberal–Conservative	J. Geddes	2,448	15.71%	
Total		15,586	–	
Source(s) Source: Nova Scotia Legislature (2024). "Electoral History for Halifax County" (PDF). nslegislature.ca.

Nova Scotia provincial by-election, 1870-11-17
Party	Candidate	Votes	%	Elected
Confederation	Philip Carteret Hill	2,150	50.16%	✓
Reformer	William Garvie	2,136	49.84%	
Total		4,286	–	
Source(s) Source: Nova Scotia Legislature (2024). "Electoral History for Halifax County" (PDF). nslegislature.ca.

1867 Nova Scotia general election
Party	Candidate	Votes	%	Elected
Anti-Confederation	Jeremiah Northup	2,386	17.64%	✓
Anti-Confederation	James Cochran	2,366	17.49%	✓
Anti-Confederation	Henry Balcom	2,364	17.48%	✓
Confederation	Philip Carteret Hill	2,152	15.91%	
Confederation	G. McLeod	2,129	15.74%	
Confederation	Stephen Tobin	2,129	15.74%	
Total		13,526	–	
Source(s) Source: Nova Scotia Legislature (2024). "Electoral History for Halifax County" (PDF). nslegislature.ca.

== See also ==
- List of Nova Scotia provincial electoral districts
- Canadian provincial electoral districts
