= 37th General Assembly of Nova Scotia =

The 37th General Assembly of Nova Scotia represented Nova Scotia between 1920 and 1925.

The Liberal Party led by George Henry Murray formed the government. Ernest Howard Armstrong succeeded Murray as premier in 1923.

Robert Irwin served as speaker for the assembly.

The assembly was dissolved on June 2, 1925.

== List of Members ==
Electoral District	Name	Party	First elected / previously elected
Annapolis County	O. T. Daniels	Liberal	1906
Annapolis County	Frank R. Elliott	Liberal	1916
Antigonish County	William Chisholm	Liberal	1916
Antigonish County	Angus J. MacGillivray	United Farmers	1920
County of Cape Breton	J.W.Morrison	Labour	1920
County of Cape Breton	Joseph Steele	Labour	1920
County of Cape Breton	Arthur Forman Waye	Labour	1920
County of Cape Breton	Arthur R. Richardson	Farmer-Labour	1920
Colchester County	Robert H. Smith	United Farmers	1920
Colchester County	Harry L. Taggart	United Farmers	1920
Cumberland County	Gilbert N. Allen	United Farmers	1920
Cumberland County	Daniel G. McKenzie	United Farmers	1920
Cumberland County	Archibald Terris	Labour	1920
Digby County	Joseph Willie Comeau	Liberal	1907, 1920
Digby County	Henry W. R. Warner	Liberal	1916
Guysborough County	James C. Tory	Liberal	1911
Guysborough County	Clarence W. Anderson	Liberal	1920
Halifax County	Henry G. Bauld	Liberal	1916
Halifax County	Robert E. Finn (Note: elected to federal seat)	Liberal	1916
Halifax County	John B. Douglas	Liberal	1920
Halifax County	Adam D. Burris	Liberal	1920
Halifax County	John L. Connolly	Liberal	1916
Halifax County	Walter Joseph O'Hearn (1922)	Liberal	1922
Hants County	James W. Reid	Liberal	1911
Hants County	John A. MacDonald	United Farmers	1920
Inverness County	Donald MacLennan	Liberal	1911
Inverness County	John C. Bourinot	Liberal	1916
Kings County	Harry H. Wickwire (Note: died in 1922)	Liberal	1894, 1910
Kings County	John A. MacDonald	Liberal	1920
Kings County	James Sealy (1922)	Liberal	1922
Lunenburg County	John James Kinley	Liberal	1916
Lunenburg County	Aubrey H. Sperry	Liberal	1920
Pictou County	R. Henry Graham	Liberal	1916
Pictou County	J. Welsford MacDonald	Liberal	1920
Pictou County	Robert M. McGregor (Note: died in 1924)	Liberal	1904
Queens County	Jordan W. Smith	Liberal	1911
Queens County	George S. McClearn	Liberal	1920
Richmond County	John Alexander Macdonald	Liberal-Conservative	1916
Richmond County	Benjamin A. LeBlanc	Liberal-Conservative	1916
Shelburne County	Robert Irwin	Liberal	1906
Shelburne County	Frank E. Smith	Liberal	1920
Shelburne County	Ernest H. Armstrong	Liberal	1906
Victoria County	George Henry Murray (Note: resigned seat)	Liberal	1896
Victoria County	Daniel Alexander Cameron (1923)	Liberal	1916, (Note: Cape Breton County) 1923
Victoria County	A. Gladstone Buchanan	Liberal	1920
Yarmouth County	H. W. Corning	Liberal-Conservative	1911, 1920
Yarmouth County	A. R. Melanson	Liberal	1920

== Notes ==
Preceded by 36th General Assembly of Nova Scotia	General Assemblies of Nova Scotia; 1920–1925	Succeeded by 38th General Assembly of Nova Scotia
