= 36th General Assembly of Nova Scotia =

The 36th General Assembly of Nova Scotia represented Nova Scotia between 1916 and 1920.

The Liberal Party led by George Henry Murray formed the government.

James F. Ellis was speaker in 1916. Robert Irwin was named speaker in 1917 because Ellis was serving overseas.

The assembly was dissolved on June 28, 1920.

== List of Members ==
| Electoral District | Name | Party | First elected / previously elected |
|---|---|---|---|
| Annapolis County | O. T. Daniels | Liberal | 1906 |
| Annapolis County | Frank R. Elliott | Liberal | 1916 |
| Antigonish County | William Chisholm | Liberal | 1916 |
| Antigonish County | Fred Robert Trotter | Liberal | 1903 |
| County of Cape Breton | John C. Douglas | Liberal-Conservative | 1911 |
| County of Cape Breton | Daniel A. Cameron | Liberal | 1916 |
| County of Cape Breton | Robert H. Butts | Liberal-Conservative | 1911 |
| County of Cape Breton | Neil Ferguson | Liberal-Conservative | 1916 |
| Colchester County | Frank Stanfield | Liberal-Conservative | 1911 |
| Colchester County | Robert H. Kennedy | Liberal-Conservative | 1911 |
| Cumberland County | Rufus S. Carter | Liberal | 1911 |
| Cumberland County | James L. Ralston | Liberal | 1911 |
| Cumberland County | James W. Kirkpatrick | Liberal-Conservative | 1916 |
| Digby County | Joseph Willie Comeau | Liberal | 1907 |
| Digby County | Henry W. R. Warner | Liberal | 1916 |
| Guysborough County | James C. Tory | Liberal | 1911 |
| Guysborough County | James F. Ellis | Liberal | 1904 |
| Halifax County | Henry G. Bauld | Liberal | 1916 |
| Halifax County | Hector McInnes | Liberal-Conservative | 1916 |
| Halifax County | Robert E. Finn | Liberal | 1916 |
| Halifax County | George Everett Faulkner | Liberal | 1906 |
| Halifax County | John L. Connolly | Liberal | 1916 |
| Hants County | Albert Parsons | Liberal-Conservative | 1909 |
| Hants County | James W. Reid | Liberal | 1911 |
| Inverness County | Donald MacLennan | Liberal | 1911 |
| Inverness County | John C. Bourinot | Liberal | 1916 |
| Kings County | Harry H. Wickwire | Liberal | 1894, 1910 |
| Kings County | James E. Kinsman | Liberal-Conservative | 1916 |
| Lunenburg County | Joseph Willis Margeson | Liberal | 1911 |
| Lunenburg County | John James Kinley | Liberal | 1916 |
| Pictou County | Robert M. McGregor | Liberal | 1904 |
| Pictou County | R. Henry Graham | Liberal-Conservative | 1916 |
| Pictou County | Robert Hugh MacKay | Liberal | 1909 |
| Queens County | William Lorimer Hall | Liberal-Conservative | 1910 |
| Queens County | Jordan W. Smith | Liberal | 1911 |
| Richmond County | Benjamin A. LeBlanc | Liberal-Conservative | 1916 |
| Richmond County | John Alexander Macdonald | Liberal-Conservative | 1916 |
| Shelburne County | Robert Irwin | Liberal | 1906 |
| Shelburne County | M. A. Nickerson | Liberal | 1902 |
| Victoria County | George Henry Murray | Liberal | 1896 |
| Victoria County | John G. Morrison | Liberal | 1894, 1916 |
| Yarmouth County | Ernest H. Armstrong | Liberal | 1906 |
| Yarmouth County | Henry T. d'Entremont | Liberal | 1916 |

== Notes ==
| Preceded by 35th General Assembly of Nova Scotia | General Assemblies of Nova Scotia; 1916–1920 | Succeeded by 37th General Assembly of Nova Scotia |
