= 1920 Nova Scotia general election =

Canadian provincial election

- July 27, 1920

43 seats of the Nova Scotia House of Assembly 22 seats needed for a majority
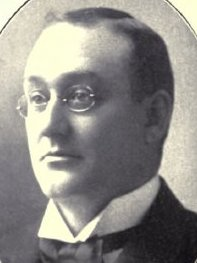
	First party	Second party
		UF
Leader	George Henry Murray	Daniel George McKenzie
Party	Liberal	United Farmers
Leader since	1896	January 20, 1920
Leader's seat	Victoria	Ran in Cumberland (Won)
Last election	30	New party
Seats won	29	6
Seat change	▼1	▲6
Popular vote	154,627	47,798
Percentage	44.4%	14.0%
Swing	▼6.0pp	New party
	Third party	Fourth party
	Lab	Con
Leader	No leader	William Lorimer Hall
Party	Labour	Liberal-Conservative
Leader since		June 29, 1922
Leader's seat		Queens (Lost re-election)
Last election	0	13
Seats won	5	3
Seat change	▲5	▼10
Popular vote	64,495	81,044
Percentage	16.9%	24.7%
Swing	▲16.5pp	▼24.1pp
Premier before election
George Henry Murray
Liberal
Premier after election
George Henry Murray
Liberal

The 1920 Nova Scotia general election was held on 27 July 1920 to elect members of the 37th House of Assembly of the province of Nova Scotia, Canada. The Liberal party won a majority of seats in the Legislaure with only 44 per cent of the vote.

This was the first general election in which women could vote and run for office.

Members were elected in multi-member districts electing from two to five members each, through plurality block voting.

== Results ==
=== Results by party ===
↓
29	6	5	3
Liberal	United Farmers	Labour	Liberal-Conservative

Official results
Party	Party leader	# of candidates	Seats				Popular vote		
Party	Party leader	# of candidates	1916	Dissolution	Elected	Change	#	%	Change (pp)
Liberal	George Henry Murray	40	30		29	-1	154,627	44.44%	-6.34%
Liberal-Conservative	William Lorimer Hall	31	13		3	-10	81,044	23.29%	-25.11%
United Farmers (Note: The United Farmers, Labour (the Independent Labour Party) and War Veterans co-operated with each other to run candidates. Candidates for the coalition were selected on the basis of which group was best represented in a riding.)	Daniel George McKenzie	17	0		6	+6	47,798	13.74%	N/A
Labour (Note: 5 elected candidates includes one Farmer-Labour candidate which is listed here with the Labour tally.)	None	12	0		5	+5	64,495	18.54%	+18.14%
Vacant									
Total valid votes							347,964	100.00%	–
Blank and invalid ballots							0	0.00%	–
Total		100	43	43	43	–	347,964	100.00%	–

Popular vote
Liberal	44.44%
Liberal-Conservative	23.29%
Labour	18.54%
United Farmers	13.74%

Seats summary
Liberal	67.44%
United Farmers	13.95%
Labour	11.63%
Liberal-Conservative	6.98%

== Retiring incumbents ==
Liberal

- James F. Ellis, Guysborough
- George Everett Faulkner, Halifax
- Robert Hugh MacKay, Pictou
- Fred Robert Trotter, Antigonish

Liberal-Conservative

- Neil Ferguson, Cape Breton
- James W. Kirkpatrick, Cumberland
- Hector MacInnes, Halifax
- Frank Stanfield, Colchester

== Nominated candidates ==
Legend
bold denotes party leader
† denotes an incumbent who is not running for re-election or was defeated in nomination contest

=== Valley ===
Electoral district	Candidates				Incumbent
Electoral district	Liberal	Liberal-Conservative	United Farmers	Labour	Incumbent
Annapolis	Frank R. Elliott; 3,330; 27.90%		Vernon B. Leonard; 2,512; 21.05%		Frank R. Elliott
Annapolis	Orlando Daniels; 3,630; 30.41%		Edgar C. Shaffner; 2,463; 20.64%		Orlando Daniels
Digby	Henry W.B. Warner; 2,997; 30.93%		Glidden Campbell; 1,835; 18.94%		Henry W.B. Warner
Digby	Joseph William Comeau; 3,165; 32.67%		Emede Robicheau; 1,692; 17.46%		Joseph William Comeau
Hants		Albert Parsons; 2,083; 21.06%	John Alexander MacDonald; 2,179; 22.03%	Wiley V. Davison; 998; 10.09%	Albert Parsons
Hants	James William Reid; 3,035; 30.69%		Walter J. Aylword; 1,594; 16.12%		James William Reid
Kings	John Alexander McDonald; 4,705; 28.21%	James E. Kinsman; 3,622; 21.71%			James E. Kinsman
Kings	Harry H. Wickwire; 4,917; 29.48%	C.R. Bill; 3,437; 20.60%			Harry H. Wickwire

=== South Shore ===
Electoral district	Candidates				Incumbent
Electoral district	Liberal	Liberal-Conservative	United Farmers	Labour	Incumbent
Lunenburg	John James Kinley; 4,900; 30.24%	Lemeau J. Hebb; 3,237; 19.98%			John James Kinley
Lunenburg	Aubrey Sperry; 4,795; 29.60%	Foster W. Verge; 3,270; 20.18%			Vacant
Queens	George S. McClearn; 1,607; 26.15%	**William Lorimer Hall**; 1,485; 24.17%			William Lorimer Hall
Queens	Jordan W. Smith; 1,737; 28.27%	Robert Smith; 1,316; 21.42%			Jordan W. Smith
Shelburne	Robert Irwin; 1,917; 28.64%	William T. Brannen; 1,623; 24.25%			Robert Irwin
Shelburne	Frank E. Smith; 1,774; 26.51%	Wendell H. Currie; 1,379; 20.60%			Frank E. Smith
Yarmouth	Ernest Howard Armstrong; 3,052; 31.55%	Howard Corning; 3,416; 35.31%			Ernest Howard Armstrong
Yarmouth	Amédée Melanson; 3,207; 33.15%				Vacant

=== Fundy-Northeast ===
Electoral district	Candidates				Incumbent
Electoral district	Liberal	Liberal-Conservative	United Farmers	Labour	Incumbent
Colchester		Robert H. Kennedy; 3,096; 23.33%	Harry L. Taggart; 3,430; 25.84%		Robert H. Kennedy
Colchester		William R. Dunbar; 3,213; 24.21%	Robert Hunter Smith; 3,533; 26.62%		Frank Stanfield†
Cumberland	James Ralston; 4,486; 14.55%	Grace McLeod Rogers; 2,470; 8.01%		Archibald Terris; 4,716; 15.30%	James Ralston
Cumberland	Varley B. Fullerton; 2,659; 8.63%	Percy L. Spicer; 1,864; 6.05%	Gilbert Nelson Allen; 4,934; 16.01%		James W. Kirkpatrick†
Cumberland	Rufus Carter; 3,215; 10.43%	Everett C. Leslie; 1,714; 5.56%	**Daniel George McKenzie**; 4,766; 15.46%		Rufus Carter

=== Halifax ===
Electoral district	Candidates				Incumbent
Electoral district	Liberal	Liberal-Conservative	United Farmers	Labour	Incumbent
Halifax	Adam Dunlap Burris; 5,936; 9.07%	John B. Archibald; 4,045; 6.18%	Joseph S. Wallace; 3,409; 5.21%	Ronald A. McDonald; 3,369; 5.15%	Hector MacInnes†
Halifax	John L. Connolly; 5,817; 8.89%	Robert A. Brenton; 3,860; 5.90%	Peter McN. Kuhn; 3,165; 4.83%	Patrick J. Healy; 3,336; 5.10%	John L. Connolly
Halifax	John Brown Douglas; 6,057; 9.25%	Frederick W. Stevens; 3,642; 5.56%		Joseph H. McKenzie; 3,157; 4.82%	George Everett Faulkner†
Halifax	Henry Bauld; 6,554; 10.01%	Francis A. Gillis; 3,595; 5.49%			Henry Bauld
Halifax	Robert Emmett Finn; 6,285; 9.60%	Edward L. Power; 3,236; 4.94%			Robert Emmett Finn

=== Central Nova ===
Electoral district	Candidates				Incumbent
Electoral district	Liberal	Liberal-Conservative	United Farmers	Labour	Incumbent
Antigonish	Alexander Stirling MacMillan; 1,725; 23.65%		Angus J. MacGillivray; 1,804; 24.73%		Fred Robert Trotter†
Antigonish	William Chisholm; 2,059; 28.23%		Fred R. Irish; 1,706; 23.39%		William Chisholm
Guysborough	Clarence W. Anderson; 2,359; 30.36%		D.P. Floyd; 1,483; 19.09%		James F. Ellis†
Guysborough	James Cranswick Tory; 2,619; 33.71%		J.A. Dillon; 1,309; 16.85%		James Cranswick Tory
Pictou	Robert M. McGregor; 6,056; 15.78%	John Bell; 4,416; 11.51%	Alexander D. MacKay; 5,984; 15.59%	Henry D. Fraser; 6,012; 15.66%	Robert M. McGregor
Pictou	John Welsford MacDonald; 6,287; 16.38%			Bertha A. Donaldson; 2,930; 7.63%	Robert Hugh MacKay†
Pictou	Robert Henry Graham; 6,696; 17.45%				Robert Henry Graham

=== Cape Breton ===
Electoral district	Candidates				Incumbent
Electoral district	Liberal	Liberal-Conservative	United Farmers	Labour	Incumbent
Cape Breton	W.F. Carroll; 6,471; 9.08%	Neil R. McArthur; 2,809; 3.94%		Joseph Steele; 9,800; 13.75%	Neil Ferguson†
Cape Breton	A.B. MacGillivray; 5,334; 7.49%	A.C. MacCormick; 2,749; 3.86%		Arthur R. Richardson; 9,177; 12.88%	Vacant
Cape Breton	Daniel Alexander Cameron; 5,729; 8.04%	Ewen MacKay Forbes; 2,343; 3.29%		Forman Waye; 9,407; 13.20%	Daniel Alexander Cameron
Cape Breton	N. MacDonald; 5,270; 7.40%	Charles B. Smith; 2,338; 3.28%		D. W. Morrison; 9,830; 13.80%	Vacant
Inverness	Donald MacLennan; 3,461; 26.32%	Moses Elijah McGarry; 2,643; 20.10%		John J. McNeil; 1,763; 13.40%	Donald MacLennan
Inverness	John C. Bourinot; 3,204; 24.36%	Malcolm McKay; 2,081; 15.82%			John C. Bourinot
Richmond	G.H. Murray; 1,761; 24.35%	Benjamin Amedeé LeBlanc; 1,823; 25.20%			Benjamin Amedeé LeBlanc
Richmond	George R. Deveau; 1,728; 23.89%	John Alexander MacDonald; 1,921; 26.56%			John Alexander MacDonald
Victoria	**George Henry Murray**; 2,078; 32.42%	Guy McL. Matheson; 1,109; 17.30%			George Henry Murray
Victoria	Angus Gladstone Buchanan; 2,013; 31.41%	Phillip McLeod; 1,209; 18.86%			Vacant
