= 1933 Nova Scotia general election =

Canadian provincial election

- August 22, 1933

30 seats of the Nova Scotia House of Assembly 16 seats needed for a majority
- Turnout: 85.90%
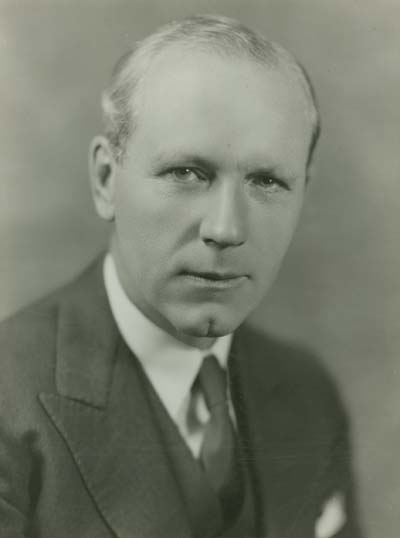

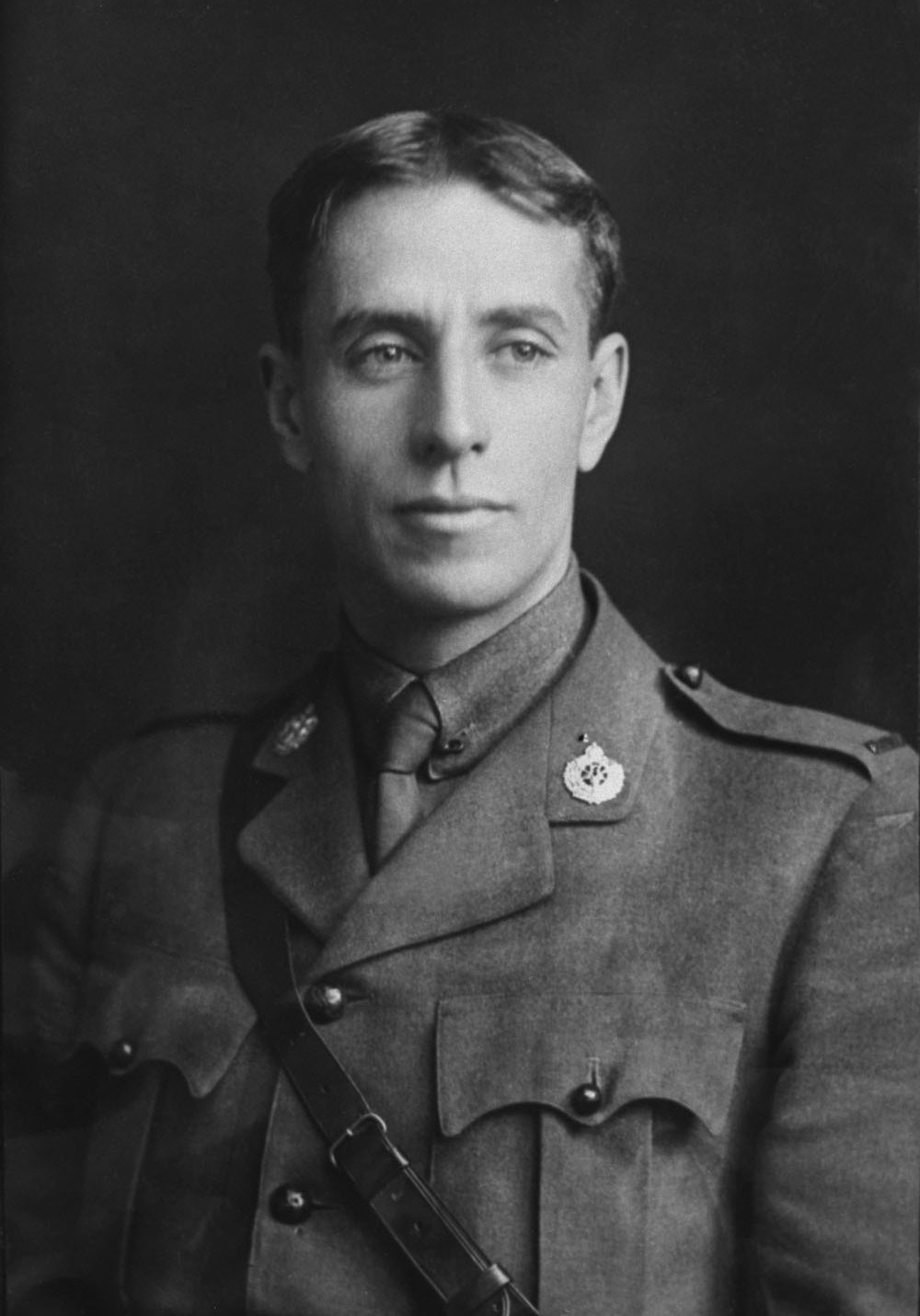
	First party	Second party
Leader	Angus Lewis Macdonald	Gordon Sidney Harrington
Party	Liberal	Liberal-Conservative
Leader since	October 1, 1930	1930
Leader's seat	Halifax South	Cape Breton Centre ran in Cape Breton South (Won)
Last election	20	22
Seats won	22	8
Seat change	▲2	▼14
Popular vote	166,170	145,107
Percentage	52.34%	45.71%
Swing	▲4.37pp	▼3.20pp
Premier before election
Gordon Sidney Harrington
Liberal-Conservative
Premier after election
Angus Lewis Macdonald
Liberal

The 1933 Nova Scotia general election was held on 22 August 1933 to elect members of the 40th House of Assembly of the province of Nova Scotia, Canada. It was won by the Liberal party.

== Results ==
=== Results by party ===
↓
22	8
Liberal	Liberal-Conservative

Official results
Party	Party leader	# of candidates	Seats				Popular vote		
Party	Party leader	# of candidates	1928	Dissolution	Elected	Change	#	%	Change (pp)
Liberal	Angus Lewis Macdonald	30	20	15	22	+2	166,170	52.34%	+4.37%
Liberal-Conservative	Gordon Sidney Harrington	30	22	20	8	-14	145,107	45.71%	-3.20%
Labour (Note: Candidates ran under the "United Front" banner)		3	1	1	0	-1	2,469	0.78%	-1.91%
Co-operative Commonwealth		3	0	0	0	0	2,336	0.74%	–
Vacant				7					
Total valid votes							316,082	99.56%	–
Blank and invalid ballots							1,403	0.44%	–
Total		66	43	43	30	-13	317,485	100.00%	–
Registered voters / turnout							295,957	85.90% (Note: While 317,485 votes were cast, only 254,233 electors voted as electors in several districts voted for two candidates.)	–

Popular vote
Liberal	52.34%
Liberal-Conservative	45.71%
Labour	0.78%
CCF	0.74%

Seats summary
Liberal	73.33%
Liberal-Conservative	26.67%

== Retiring incumbents ==
Liberal

- William Chisholm, Antigonish
- René W.E. Landry, Yarmouth
- Michael M. Morrison, Guysborough
- Wishart McLea Robertson, Shelburne

Liberal-Conservative

- Robert Hamilton Butts, Cape Breton East
- Reginald Tucker Caldwell, Kings
- Robert Albert Douglas, Pictou
- Donald W. MacKay, Queens
- Harry Thompson MacKenzie, Annapolis
- Hugh Allan MacQuarrie, Pictou
- Daniel George McKenzie, Cumberland
- James A. Proudfoot, Inverness

== Nominated candidates ==
Legend
bold denotes party leader
† denotes an incumbent who is not running for re-election or was defeated in nomination contest

=== Valley ===
Electoral district	Candidates				Incumbent
Electoral district	Liberal-Conservative	Liberal	Labour	CCF	Incumbent
Annapolis	Obediah Parker Goucher; 3,967; 44.65%	John D. McKenzie; 4,917; 55.35%			Obediah Parker Goucher
Annapolis	Obediah Parker Goucher; 3,967; 44.65%	John D. McKenzie; 4,917; 55.35%			Harry Thompson MacKenzie†
Digby	Jean-Louis Philippe Robicheau; 3,703; 40.80%	Joseph William Comeau; 5,372; 59.20%			Joseph William Comeau
Digby	Jean-Louis Philippe Robicheau; 3,703; 40.80%	Joseph William Comeau; 5,372; 59.20%			Alexander Stirling MacMillan
Hants	Albert Parsons; 4,603; 46.35%	Alexander Stirling MacMillan; 5,328; 53.65%			Albert Parsons
Hants	Albert Parsons; 4,603; 46.35%	Alexander Stirling MacMillan; 5,328; 53.65%			Vacant
Kings	George Nowlan; 6,098; 47.65%	John Alexander McDonald; 6,700; 52.35%			George Nowlan
Kings	George Nowlan; 6,098; 47.65%	John Alexander McDonald; 6,700; 52.35%			Reginald Tucker Caldwell†

=== South Shore ===
Electoral district	Candidates				Incumbent
Electoral district	Liberal-Conservative	Liberal	Labour	CCF	Incumbent
Lunenburg	Wallace Norman Rehfuss; 6,744; 21.78%	Frank R. Davis; 8,369; 27.03%			Vacant
Lunenburg	Melbourne M. Gardner; 7,049; 22.77%	Gordon E. Romkey; 8,799; 28.42%			Gordon E. Romkey
Queens	Seth M. Bartling; 2,880; 50.91%	Roland M. Irving; 2,777; 49.09%			Donald W. MacKay†
Queens	Seth M. Bartling; 2,880; 50.91%	Roland M. Irving; 2,777; 49.09%			Vacant
Shelburne	James W. Maddin; 2,500; 43.46%	Henry R. L. Bill; 3,252; 56.54%			Henry R. L. Bill
Shelburne	James W. Maddin; 2,500; 43.46%	Henry R. L. Bill; 3,252; 56.54%			Wishart McLea Robertson†
Yarmouth	Alvin L. Chipman; 3,646; 38.49%	Lindsay C. Gardner; 5,826; 61.51%			Lindsay C. Gardner
Yarmouth	Alvin L. Chipman; 3,646; 38.49%	Lindsay C. Gardner; 5,826; 61.51%			René W.E. Landry†

=== Fundy-Northeast ===
Electoral district	Candidates				Incumbent
Electoral district	Liberal-Conservative	Liberal	Labour	CCF	Incumbent
Colchester	William A. Flemming; 6,748; 27.04%	Thomas R. Johnson; 6,043; 24.21%			William A. Flemming
Colchester	George Y. Thomas; 6,398; 25.64%	R. Edgar McLeod; 5,769; 23.11%			Vacant
Cumberland	Archibald Terris; 8,291; 22.73%	John S. Smiley; 9,540; 26.15%			Archibald Terris
Cumberland	Percy Chapman Black; 9,406; 25.78%	Earle B. Paul; 9,242; 25.34%			Percy Chapman Black
Cumberland	Percy Chapman Black; 9,406; 25.78%	Earle B. Paul; 9,242; 25.34%			Daniel George McKenzie†

=== Halifax/Dartmouth/Eastern Shore ===
Electoral district	Candidates				Incumbent
Electoral district	Liberal-Conservative	Liberal	Labour	CCF	Incumbent
Halifax Centre	Russell McInnes; 3,967; 43.94%	Guy Murray Logan; 4,915; 54.44%	Joseph S. Wallace; 146; 1.62%		Vacant; Halifax
Halifax East	Josiah Frederick Fraser; 5,595; 47.14%	Geoffrey W. Stevens; 6,273; 52.86%			Josiah Frederick Fraser; Halifax
Halifax North	Gerald P. Flavin; 3,410; 38.48%	Gordon Benjamin Isnor; 5,452; 61.52%			Gordon Benjamin Isnor; Halifax
Halifax South	George Henry Murphy; 4,325; 46.66%	**Angus Lewis Macdonald**; 4,945; 53.34%			George Henry Murphy; Halifax
Halifax West	Angus MacDonald Morton; 3,957; 45.17%	George E. Hagen; 4,804; 54.83%			Angus MacDonald Morton; Halifax

=== Central Nova ===
Electoral district	Candidates				Incumbent
Electoral district	Liberal-Conservative	Liberal	Labour	CCF	Incumbent
Antigonish	John A. Walker; 2,482; 45.68%	John L. MacIsaac; 2,951; 54.32%			John L. MacIsaac
Antigonish	John A. Walker; 2,482; 45.68%	John L. MacIsaac; 2,951; 54.32%			William Chisholm†
Guysborough	Leonard W. Fraser; 3,408; 43.44%	Clarence W. Anderson; 4,437; 56.56%			Clarence W. Anderson
Guysborough	Leonard W. Fraser; 3,408; 43.44%	Clarence W. Anderson; 4,437; 56.56%			Michael E. Morrison†
Pictou	John Doull; 8,546; 22.10%	Donald F. Fraser; 10,377; 26.83%			John Doull
Pictou	John W. MacLeod; 8,861; 22.91%	Josiah H. MacQuarrie; 10,887; 28.15%			Hugh Allan MacQuarrie†
Pictou	John W. MacLeod; 8,861; 22.91%	Josiah H. MacQuarrie; 10,887; 28.15%			Robert Albert Douglas†

=== Cape Breton ===
Electoral district	Candidates				Incumbent
Electoral district	Liberal-Conservative	Liberal	Labour	CCF	Incumbent
Cape Breton Centre	Neil R. McArthur; 2,969; 43.53%	Michael Dwyer; 3,263; 47.84%		Thomas Ling; 588; 8.62%	Gordon Sidney Harrington
Cape Breton Centre	Neil R. McArthur; 2,969; 43.53%	Michael Dwyer; 3,263; 47.84%		Thomas Ling; 588; 8.62%	Joseph Macdonald
Cape Breton East	Daniel R. Cameron; 3,632; 38.97%	Lauchlin Daniel Currie; 3,655; 39.21%	James B. McLachlan; 1,737; 18.64%	Donald O. Fraser; 297; 3.19%	Daniel R. Cameron
Cape Breton East	Daniel R. Cameron; 3,632; 38.97%	Lauchlin Daniel Currie; 3,655; 39.21%	James B. McLachlan; 1,737; 18.64%	Donald O. Fraser; 297; 3.19%	Robert Hamilton Butts†
Cape Breton North	Joseph Macdonald; 4,448; 47.50%	Luke Daye; 4,330; 46.24%	John McDonald; 586; 6.26%		New riding
Cape Breton South	**Gordon Sidney Harrington**; 4,757; 43.81%	Malcolm A. Patterson; 4,650; 42.83%		Lauchlin D. McKay; 1,451; 13.36%	New riding
Cape Breton West	Weldon W. Patton; 3,036; 53.49%	Alonzo Martell; 2,640; 46.51%			Alonzo Martell; Richmond-West Cape Breton
Inverness	Hubert Meen Aucoin; 4,862; 46.36%	Moses Elijah McGarry; 5,626; 53.64%			Moses Elijah McGarry
Inverness	Hubert Meen Aucoin; 4,862; 46.36%	Moses Elijah McGarry; 5,626; 53.64%			James A. Proudfoot†
Richmond	Benjamin A. LeBlanc; 2,603; 46.46%	George R. Deveau; 3,000; 53.54%			Vacant; Richmond-West Cape Breton
Victoria	Frederick Walker Baldwin; 2,216; 52.18%	Donald Buchanan McLeod; 2,031; 47.82%			Donald Buchanan McLeod
Victoria	Frederick Walker Baldwin; 2,216; 52.18%	Donald Buchanan McLeod; 2,031; 47.82%			Vacant
