= 1925 Nova Scotia general election =

Canadian provincial election

- June 25, 1925

43 seats of the Nova Scotia House of Assembly 22 seats needed for a majority
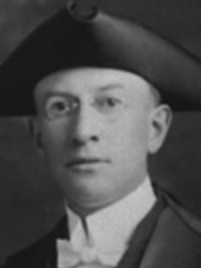

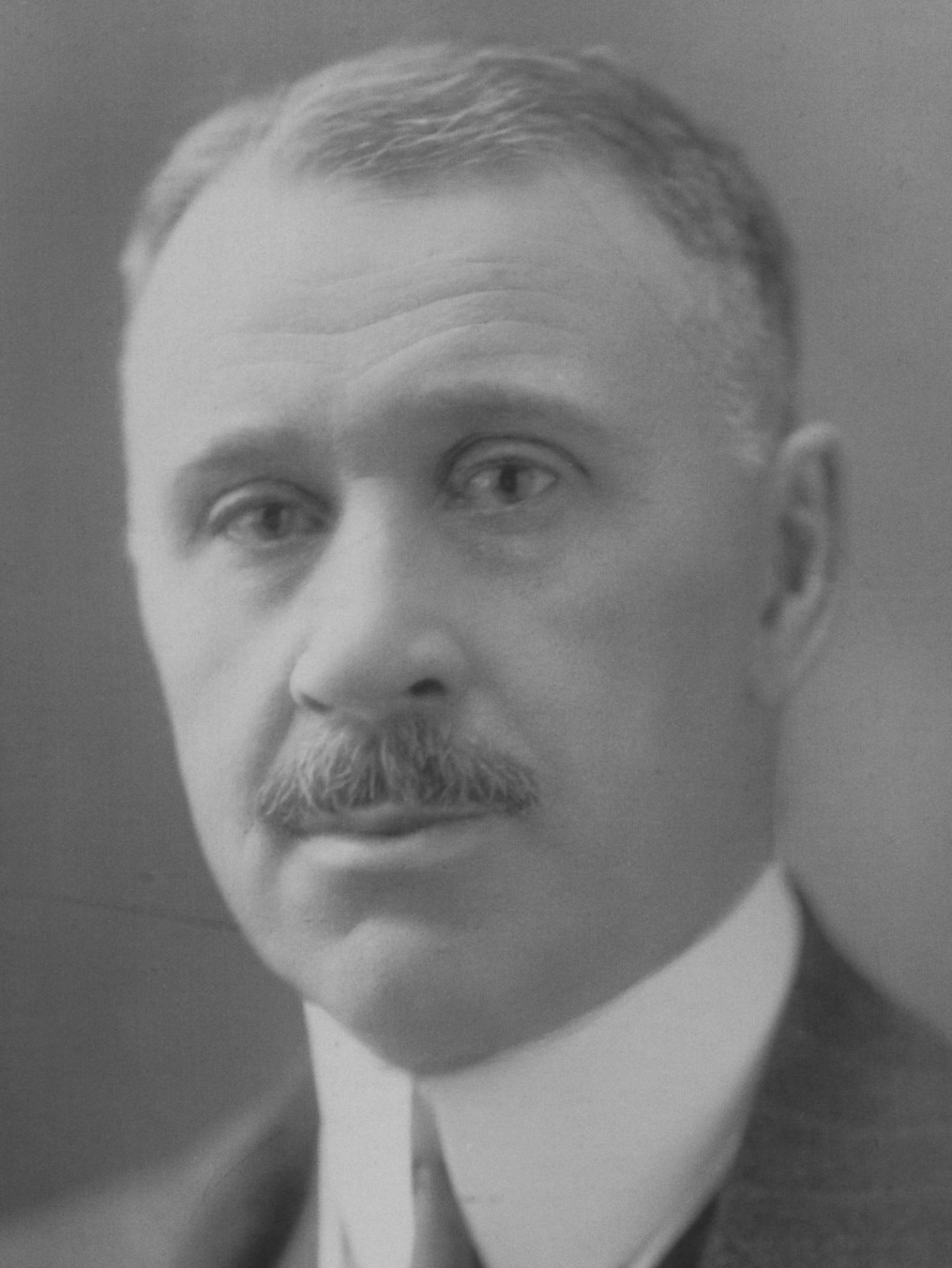
	First party	Second party	Third party
			Lab
Leader	Edgar Nelson Rhodes	Ernest Howard Armstrong	No leader
Party	Liberal-Conservative	Liberal	Labour
Leader since	May 21, 1925	1923
Leader's seat	Ran in Hants (Won)	Shelburne (Lost re-election)
Last election	3	29	5
Seats won	39	3	1
Seat change	▲36	▼26	▼4
Popular vote	262,277	161,158	20,527
Percentage	60.9%	36.3%	2.8%
Swing	▲36.24pp	▼8.14pp	▼11.27pp
Premier before election
Ernest Howard Armstrong
Liberal
Premier after election
Edgar Nelson Rhodes
Liberal-Conservative

The 1925 Nova Scotia general election was held on 25 June 1925 to elect members of the 38th House of Assembly of the province of Nova Scotia, Canada. It was won by the Liberal-Conservative party.

== Results ==
=== Results by party ===
↓
39	3	1
Liberal-Conservative	Liberal	Labour

Official results
Party	Party leader	# of candidates	Seats				Popular vote		
Party	Party leader	# of candidates	1920	Dissolution	Elected	Change	#	%	Change (pp)
Liberal-Conservative	Edgar Nelson Rhodes	42	3		39	+36	262,277	59.07%	+36.24%
Liberal	Ernest Howard Armstrong	43	29		3	-26	161,158	36.30%	-8.14%
Labour	None	11	0		1	-4	20,527	4.62%	-11.27%
Vacant									
Total valid votes							443,962	100.00%	–
Blank and invalid ballots							0	0.00%	–
Total		96	43	43	43	–	443,962	100.00%	–

Popular vote
Liberal-Conservative	59.08%
Liberal	36.30%
Labour	4.62%

Seats summary
Liberal-Conservative	90.69%
Liberal	6.98%
Labour	2.33%

== Retiring incumbents ==
Labour

- Arthur R. Richardson, Cape Breton Centre

Liberal

- Angus Gladstone Buchanan, Victoria
- Adam Dunlap Burris, Halifax
- Daniel Alexander Cameron, Victoria
- Joseph William Comeau, Digby
- John L. Connolly, Halifax
- Orlando Daniels, Annapolis
- Robert Henry Graham, Pictou
- Donald MacLennan, Inverness
- Amédée Melanson, Yarmouth
- James Sealy, Kings

United Farmers

- Gilbert Nelson Allen, Cumberland
- John Alexander MacDonald, Hants
- Angus J. MacGillivray, Antigonish
- Robert Hunter Smith, Colchester
- Harry L. Taggart, Colchester

== Nominated candidates ==
Legend
bold denotes party leader
† denotes an incumbent who is not running for re-election or was defeated in nomination contest The band that is coloured shows which candidates were successful in 1925.

=== Valley ===
Electoral district	Candidates			Incumbent
Electoral district	Liberal	Labour	Liberal-Conservative	Incumbent
Annapolis	Frank R. Elliott; 3,165; 21.53%		Obediah Parker Goucher; 4,331; 29.46%	Frank R. Elliott
Annapolis	Kenneth L. Crowell; 3,071; 20.89%		Harry Thompson MacKenzie; 4,133; 28.12%	Orlando Daniels†
Digby	Henry W.B. Warner; 2,545; 19.95%		Jean-Louis Philippe Robicheau; 3,827; 30.00%	Henry W.B. Warner
Digby	Gilbert J. Belliveau; 2,524; 19.78%		William Hudson Farnham; 3,862; 30.27%	Joseph William Comeau†
Hants	James William Reid; 3,075; 20.08%		Albert Parsons; 4,806; 31.38%	James William Reid
Hants	Lionel A. Forsyth; 2,860; 18.68%		**Edgar Nelson Rhodes**; 4,573; 29.86%	John Alexander MacDonald†
Kings	John A. McDonald; 4,963; 24.23%		George Nowlan; 5,520; 26.95%	John A. McDonald
Kings	Allison H. Borden; 4,543; 22.18%		Reginald Tucker Caldwell; 5,455; 26.63%	James Sealy†

=== South Shore ===
Electoral district	Candidates			Incumbent
Electoral district	Liberal	Labour	Liberal-Conservative	Incumbent
Lunenburg	John James Kinley; 4,528; 19.82%		Wallace Norman Rehfuss; 7,159; 31.34%	John James Kinley
Lunenburg	Aubrey Sperry; 4,254; 18.62%		William Haslam Smith; 6,902; 30.21%	Aubrey Sperry
Queens	George S. McClearn; 1,735; 23.06%		William Lorimer Hall; 1,934; 25.70%	George S. McClearn
Queens	Jordan W. Smith; 1,874; 24.90%		Frank J.D. Barnjum; 1,982; 26.34%	Jordan W. Smith
Shelburne	Robert Irwin; 2,001; 21.90%		Ernest Reginald Nickerson; 2,596; 28.42%	Robert Irwin
Shelburne	**Ernest Howard Armstrong**; 2,087; 22.84%		Norman Emmons Smith; 2,452; 26.84%	Ernest Howard Armstrong
Yarmouth	Lindsay C. Gardner; 3,032; 22.66%		John Flint Cahan; 3,852; 28.79%	Vacant
Yarmouth	René W.E. Landry; 3,079; 23.02%		Raymond Neri d'Entremont; 3,415; 25.53%	Amédée Melanson†

=== Fundy-Northeast ===
Electoral district	Candidates			Incumbent
Electoral district	Liberal	Labour	Liberal-Conservative	Incumbent
Colchester	Maynard B. Archibald; 2,634; 14.42%		William Boardman Armstrong; 6,733; 36.86%	Harry L. Taggart†
Colchester	Frank A. Reynolds; 2,461; 13.47%		Frank Stanfield; 6,439; 35.25%	Robert Hunter Smith†
Cumberland	James Ralston; 5,508; 13.45%	Archibald Terris; 8,267; 20.18%		Archibald Terris
Cumberland	Charles H. Read; 4,797; 11.71%		Percy Chapman Black; 9,057; 22.11%	Gilbert Nelson Allen†
Cumberland	James M. Wardrope; 4,754; 11.61%		Daniel George McKenzie; 8,580; 20.95%	Daniel George McKenzie

=== Halifax ===
Electoral district	Candidates			Incumbent
Electoral district	Liberal	Labour	Liberal-Conservative	Incumbent
Halifax	John Murphy; 8,291; 6.86%	Walter Mosher; 571; 0.47%	John Archibald Walker; 15,679; 12.97%	Adam Dunlap Burris†
Halifax	John G. MacDougall; 8,256; 6.83%	Robert Daw; 480; 0.40%	William Drysdale Piercey; 15,672; 12.97%	John L. Connolly†
Halifax	John Brown Douglas; 7,905; 6.54%	Alban L. Breen; 392; 0.32%	Josiah Frederick Fraser; 15,985; 13.23%	John Brown Douglas
Halifax	Henry Bauld; 7,900; 6.54%		John Francis Mahoney; 15,899; 13.16%	Henry Bauld
Halifax	Walter J.A. O'Hearn; 7,872; 6.51%		Alexander Montgomerie; 15,952; 13.20%	Walter J.A. O'Hearn

=== Central Nova ===
Electoral district	Candidates			Incumbent
Electoral district	Liberal	Labour	Liberal-Conservative	Incumbent
Antigonish	John L. MacIsaac; 2,393; 27.74%		Duncan S. Chisholm; 2,095; 24.29%	Angus J. MacGillivray†
Antigonish	William Chisholm; 2,267; 26.28%		Fred R. Irish; 1,871; 21.69%	William Chisholm
Guysborough	Clarence W. Anderson; 2,668; 23.70%		Simon Osborn Giffin; 2,995; 26.61%	Clarence W. Anderson
Guysborough	James Cranswick Tory; 2,763; 24.55%		Howard Amos Rice; 2,830; 25.14%	James Cranswick Tory
Pictou	Archibald McColl; 5,591; 12.18%	William Murray; 695; 1.51%	John Doull; 9,432; 20.55%	Vacant
Pictou	John Welsford MacDonald; 5,464; 11.91%	J. Gordon Calkin; 668; 1.46%	Hugh Allan MacQuarrie; 9,043; 19.71%	John Welsford MacDonald
Pictou	George W. Whitman; 5,332; 11.62%	Joseph White; 610; 1.33%	Robert Albert Douglas; 9,053; 19.73%	Robert Henry Graham†

=== Cape Breton ===
Electoral district	Candidates			Incumbent
Electoral district	Liberal	Labour	Liberal-Conservative	Incumbent
Cape Breton Centre	Daniel McDonald; 3,277; 14.68%	Joseph Steele; 313; 1.40%	Gordon Sidney Harrington; 7,621; 34.13%	Joseph Steele; Cape Breton
Cape Breton Centre	James McConnell; 3,210; 14.38%	Emerson Campbell; 295; 1.32%	Joseph Macdonald; 7,611; 34.09%	Arthur R. Richardson†; Cape Breton
Cape Breton East	Dan C. McDonald; 933; 3.82%	Forman Waye; 4,051; 16.57%	John Carey Douglas; 7,276; 29.77%	Forman Waye; Cape Breton
Cape Breton East	James L. McKinnon; 928; 3.80%	D. W. Morrison; 4,185; 17.12%	Alexander O'Handley; 7,071; 28.93%	D. W. Morrison; Cape Breton
Inverness	Moses Elijah McGarry; 3,906; 24.46%		Hubert Meen Aucoin; 4,019; 25.17%	Donald MacLennan†
Inverness	John C. Bourinot; 3,862; 24.19%		Malcolm McKay; 4,180; 26.18%	John C. Bourinot
Richmond-West Cape Breton	Donald D. Boyd; 2,667; 21.67%		Benjamin Amedeé LeBlanc; 3,500; 28.44%	Benjamin Amedeé LeBlanc; Richmond
Richmond-West Cape Breton	George R. Deveau; 2,637; 21.43%		John Alexander MacDonald; 8,466; 52.70%	John Alexander MacDonald; Richmond
Victoria	Donald Buchanan McLeod; 1,874; 27.05%		Hector A. McLeod; 1,622; 23.41%	Angus Gladstone Buchanan†
Victoria	Alexander K. McKenzie; 1,672; 24.13%		Phillip McLeod; 1,760; 25.40%	Daniel Alexander Cameron†
