= 1928 Nova Scotia general election =

Canadian provincial election

- October 1, 1928

43 seats of the Nova Scotia House of Assembly 22 seats needed for a majority
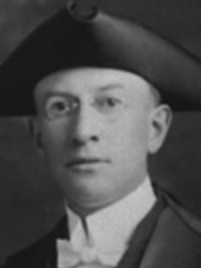

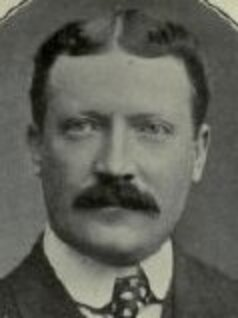
| | First party | Second party | Third party |
|---|---|---|---|
| | | | Lab |
| Leader | Edgar Nelson Rhodes | William Chisholm | No leader |
| Party | Liberal-Conservative | Liberal | Labour |
| Leader since | May 21, 1925 | 1925 |
| Leader's seat | Hants | Antigonish |
| Last election | 39 | 3 | 1 |
| Seats won | 22 | 20 | 1 |
| Seat change | ▼17 | ▲17 | Steady |
| Popular vote | 210,442 | 206,541 | 11,529 |
| Percentage | 51.7% | 47.2% | 1.1% |
| Swing | ▼9.97pp | ▲11.90pp | ▼1.93pp |
Premier before election
Edgar Nelson Rhodes
Liberal-Conservative
Premier after election
Edgar Nelson Rhodes
Liberal-Conservative

The 1928 Nova Scotia general election was held on 1 October 1928 to elect members of the 39th House of Assembly of the province of Nova Scotia, Canada. It was won by the Liberal-Conservative party.

== Results ==
=== Results by party ===
↓
| 22 | 20 | 1 |
| Liberal-Conservative | Liberal | Labour |

Official results
| Party | Party leader | # of candidates | Seats | | | | Popular vote | | |
| Party | Party leader | # of candidates | 1925 | Dissolution | Elected | Change | # | % | Change (pp) |
|---|---|---|---|---|---|---|---|---|---|
| Liberal-Conservative | Edgar Nelson Rhodes | 42 | 39 | | 22 | -17 | 210,442 | 49.11% | -9.97% |
| Liberal | William Chisholm | 43 | 3 | | 20 | +17 | 206,541 | 48.20% | +11.90% |
| Labour | None | 3 | 1 | | 1 | 0 | 11,529 | 4.62% | -1.93% |
| Vacant | | | | | | | | | |
| Total valid votes | | | | | | | 428,512 | 100.00% | – |
| Blank and invalid ballots | | | | | | | 0 | 0.00% | – |
| Total | | 88 | 43 | 43 | 43 | – | 428,512 | 100.00% | – |

Popular vote
| Liberal-Conservative | 49.11% |
| Liberal | 48.20% |
| Labour | 4.62% |

Seats summary
| Liberal-Conservative | 51.16% |
| Liberal | 46.51% |
| Labour | 2.33% |

== Retiring incumbents ==
Liberal-Conservative

- William Boardman Armstrong, Colchester
- William Hudson Farnham, Digby
- Alexander Montgomerie, Halifax
- Alexander O'Handley, Cape Breton East
- William Drysdale Piercey, Halifax

== Nominated candidates ==
Legend
bold denotes party leader
† denotes an incumbent who is not running for re-election or was defeated in nomination contest 0

=== Valley ===
| Electoral district | Candidates | | | Incumbent |
| Electoral district | Liberal-Conservative | Liberal | Labour | Incumbent |
|---|---|---|---|---|
| Annapolis | Obediah Parker Goucher; 3,689; 25.90% | John D. McKenzie; 3,450; 24.22% | | Obediah Parker Goucher |
| Annapolis | Harry Thompson MacKenzie; 3,645; 25.59% | Daniel Owen; 3,461; 24.30% | | Harry Thompson MacKenzie |
| Digby | Jean-Louis Philippe Robicheau; 3,125; 22.88% | Joseph William Comeau; 3,763; 27.55% | | Jean-Louis Philippe Robicheau |
| Digby | H.E. Wagner; 3,213; 23.52% | Alexander Stirling MacMillan; 3,557; 26.04% | | William Hudson Farnham† |
| Hants | Albert Parsons; 4,087; 26.46% | James William Reid; 3,823; 24.75% | | Albert Parsons |
| Hants | **Edgar Nelson Rhodes**; 4,008; 25.95% | Robert Gass; 3,528; 22.84% | | Edgar Nelson Rhodes |
| Kings | George Nowlan; 5,452; 27.25% | James F. Durno; 5,003; 25.01% | | George Nowlan |
| Kings | Reginald Tucker Caldwell; 5,540; 27.69% | Frederick J. Porter; 4,010; 20.04% | | Reginald Tucker Caldwell |

=== South Shore ===
| Electoral district | Candidates | | | Incumbent |
| Electoral district | Liberal-Conservative | Liberal | Labour | Incumbent |
|---|---|---|---|---|
| Lunenburg | Wallace Norman Rehfuss; 5,709; 23.71% | John James Kinley; 6,533; 27.13% | | Wallace Norman Rehfuss |
| Lunenburg | William Haslam Smith; 5,535; 22.98% | Gordon E. Romkey; 6,304; 26.18% | | William Haslam Smith |
| Queens | William Lorimer Hall; 2,206; 29.36% | Frederick Dickie; 1,649; 21.95% | | William Lorimer Hall |
| Queens | Donald W. MacKay; 1,937; 25.78% | Roland M. Irving; 1,721; 22.91% | | Vacant |
| Shelburne | Ernest Reginald Nickerson; 2,121; 23.26% | Henry R. L. Bill; 2,474; 27.13% | | Ernest Reginald Nickerson |
| Shelburne | Norman Emmons Smith; 2,052; 22.50% | Wishart McLea Robertson; 2,473; 27.12% | | Norman Emmons Smith |
| Yarmouth | John Flint Cahan; 3,666; 24.26% | Lindsay C. Gardner; 4,141; 27.41% | | John Flint Cahan |
| Yarmouth | Raymond Neri d'Entremont; 3,286; 21.75% | René W.E. Landry; 4,016; 26.58% | | Raymond Neri d'Entremont |

=== Fundy-Northeast ===
| Electoral district | Candidates | | | Incumbent |
| Electoral district | Liberal-Conservative | Liberal | Labour | Incumbent |
|---|---|---|---|---|
| Colchester | William A. Flemming; 4,882; 27.74% | William R. Dunbar; 3,583; 20.36% | | William Boardman Armstrong† |
| Colchester | Frank Stanfield; 5,298; 30.10% | Donald L. MacKinnon; 3,839; 21.81% | | Frank Stanfield |
| Cumberland | | John S. Smiley; 6,230; 15.99% | Archibald Terris; 6,667; 17.11% | Archibald Terris |
| Cumberland | Percy Chapman Black; 7,710; 19.78% | Charles H. Read; 5,758; 14.78% | | Percy Chapman Black |
| Cumberland | Daniel George McKenzie; 6,605; 16.95% | Kenneth Judson Cochrane; 5,999; 15.39% | | Daniel George McKenzie |

=== Halifax ===
| Electoral district | Candidates | | | Incumbent |
| Electoral district | Liberal-Conservative | Liberal | Labour | Incumbent |
|---|---|---|---|---|
| Halifax | John Archibald Walker; 11,076; 9.95% | Edward Joseph Cragg; 11,215; 10.08% | | John Archibald Walker |
| Halifax | Frederick P. Bligh; 11,082; 9.96% | Gordon Benjamin Isnor; 11,357; 10.21% | | William Drysdale Piercey† |
| Halifax | Josiah Frederick Fraser; 11,298; 10.15% | Thomas J. Byrne; 10,939; 9.83% | | Josiah Frederick Fraser |
| Halifax | John Francis Mahoney; 11,589; 10.41% | Bernard W. Russell; 10,855; 9.76% | | John Francis Mahoney |
| Halifax | Angus MacDonald Morton; 11,273; 10.13% | William J. Kennedy; 10,591; 9.52% | | Alexander Montgomerie† |

=== Central Nova ===
| Electoral district | Candidates | | | Incumbent |
| Electoral district | Liberal-Conservative | Liberal | Labour | Incumbent |
|---|---|---|---|---|
| Antigonish | John D. MacIntyre; 1,792; 20.95% | John L. MacIsaac; 2,431; 28.42% | | John L. MacIsaac |
| Antigonish | John F. McLellan; 1,925; 22.50% | **William Chisholm**; 2,407; 28.14% | | William Chisholm |
| Guysborough | Simon Osborn Giffin; 2,980; 23.60% | Clarence W. Anderson; 3,337; 26.43% | | Simon Osborn Giffin |
| Guysborough | Howard Amos Rice; 3,018; 23.90% | Michael E. Morrison; 3,293; 26.08% | | Howard Amos Rice |
| Pictou | John Doull; 7,836; 18.21% | Donald F. Fraser; 7,052; 16.38% | | John Doull |
| Pictou | Hugh Allan MacQuarrie; 7,249; 16.84% | A.T. Logan; 6,836; 15.88% | | Hugh Allan MacQuarrie |
| Pictou | Robert Albert Douglas; 7,572; 17.59% | Clifford E. Carruthers; 6,498; 15.10% | | Robert Albert Douglas |

=== Cape Breton ===
| Electoral district | Candidates | | | Incumbent |
| Electoral district | Liberal-Conservative | Liberal | Labour | Incumbent |
|---|---|---|---|---|
| Cape Breton Centre | Gordon Sidney Harrington; 5,949; 29.22% | Malcolm A. Patterson; 4,384; 21.54% | | Gordon Sidney Harrington |
| Cape Breton Centre | Joseph Macdonald; 5,762; 28.31% | Luke Daye; 4,261; 20.93% | | Joseph Macdonald |
| Cape Breton East | Daniel R. Cameron; 5,541; 21.98% | Lauchlin Daniel Currie; 4,724; 18.73% | Forman Waye; 2,273; 9.01% | Vacant |
| Cape Breton East | Robert Hamilton Butts; 5,568; 22.08% | Dan C. McDonald; 4,520; 17.93% | James B. McLachlan; 2,589; 10.27% | Alexander O'Handley† |
| Inverness | Hubert Meen Aucoin; 3,865; 23.37% | Moses Elijah McGarry; 4,318; 26.11% | | Hubert Meen Aucoin |
| Inverness | Malcolm McKay; 3,930; 23.77% | James A. Proudfoot; 4,422; 26.74% | | Malcolm McKay |
| Richmond-West Cape Breton | Benjamin Amedeé LeBlanc; 2,044; 24.77% | Alonzo Martell; 2,055; 24.90% | | Benjamin Amedeé LeBlanc |
| Richmond-West Cape Breton | John Angus Stewart; 2,035; 24.66% | Edward C. Doyle; 2,118; 25.67% | | John Angus Stewart |
| Victoria | H.A. Grant; 1,640; 23.75% | Donald Buchanan McLeod; 1,840; 26.65% | | Donald Buchanan McLeod |
| Victoria | Phillip McLeod; 1,652; 23.92% | Daniel Alexander Cameron; 1,773; 25.68% | | Phillip McLeod |
