= 1916 Nova Scotia general election =

Canadian provincial election

- June 20, 1916

43 seats of the Nova Scotia House of Assembly 22 seats needed for a majority
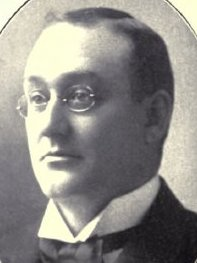

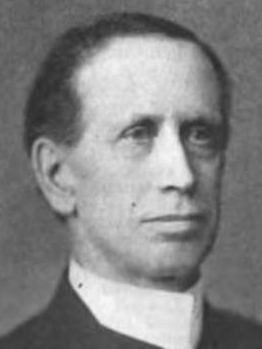
	First party	Second party
Leader	George Henry Murray	Charles Elliott Tanner
Party	Liberal	Liberal-Conservative
Leader since	1896	1912
Leader's seat	Victoria	Pictou (Lost re-election)
Last election	27	11
Seats won	30	13
Seat change	▲3	▲2
Popular vote	136,829	130,430
Percentage	50.4%	48.8%
Swing	▼0.7pp	▲3.4pp
- Results by riding
Premier before election
George Henry Murray
Liberal
Premier after election
George Henry Murray
Liberal

The 1916 Nova Scotia general election was held on 20 June 1916 to elect members of the 36th House of Assembly of the province of Nova Scotia, Canada. It was won by the Liberal party.

== Results ==
=== Results by party ===
↓
30	13
Liberal	Liberal-Conservative

Official results
Party	Party leader	# of candidates	Seats				Popular vote		
Party	Party leader	# of candidates	1911	Dissolution	Elected	Change	#	%	Change (pp)
Liberal	George Henry Murray	43	27		30	+3	136,829	50.77%	-0.32%
Liberal-Conservative	Charles Elliott Tanner	43	11		13	+2	130,430	48.40%	+3.02%
Independent/Other		1	0		0	0	1,038	0.38%	-1.39%
Labour	None	2	0		0	0	1,117	0.43%	-1.34%
Vacant									
Total valid votes							269,474	100.00%	–
Blank and invalid ballots							0	0.00%	–
Total		89	38	38	43	–	269,474	100.00%	–

Popular vote
Liberal	50.77%
Liberal-Conservative	48.40%
Other	0.81%

Seats summary
Liberal	67.77%
Liberal-Conservative	30.23%

== Retiring incumbents ==
Liberal

- Charles P. Bissett, Richmond
- Archibald M. Covert, Kings
- Fullton Johnson Logan, Halifax
- James MacDonald, Inverness
- Smith Nickerson, Shelburne

Liberal-Conservative

- Harry Hatheway Marshall, Digby
- Norman Phinney, Annapolis

== Nominated candidates ==
Legend
bold denotes party leader
† denotes an incumbent who is not running for re-election or was defeated in nomination contest

=== Valley ===
Electoral district	Candidates				Incumbent
Electoral district	Liberal	Liberal-Conservative	Labour	Other	Incumbent
Annapolis	Orlando Daniels; 2,149; 26.34%	Obediah Parker Goucher; 2,020; 24.76%			Orlando Daniels
Annapolis	Frank R. Elliott; 2,077; 25.46%	Earle C. Phinney; 1,912; 23.44%			Norman Phinney†
Digby	Henry W.B. Warner; 1,903; 26.81%	Felix M. Gaudet; 1,604; 22.59%			Harry Hatheway Marshall†
Digby	Joseph William Comeau; 2,002; 28.20%	Walton K. Tibert; 1,590; 22.40%			Joseph William Comeau
Hants	Burchill R. Fulmer; 1,929; 23.63%	Albert Parsons; 2,142; 26.24%			Albert Parsons
Hants	James William Reid; 2,051; 25.13%	Herbert W. Sangster; 2,041; 25.00%			James William Reid
Kings	Charles Alexander Campbell; 2,318; 24.53%	James E. Kinsman; 2,421; 25.62%			Archibald M. Covert†
Kings	Harry H. Wickwire; 2,499; 26.44%	Joseph D. Spidell; 2,212; 23.41%			Harry H. Wickwire

=== South Shore ===
Electoral district	Candidates				Incumbent
Electoral district	Liberal	Liberal-Conservative	Labour	Other	Incumbent
Lunenburg	John James Kinley; 2,992; 26.90%	Alfred Clairmonte Zwicker; 2,082; 18.72%			Alfred Clairmonte Zwicker
Lunenburg	Oscar G. Donovan; 2,768; 24.88%	Joseph Willis Margeson; 3,282; 29.50%			Joseph Willis Margeson
Queens	Frederick R. Freeman; 977; 23.33%	William Lorimer Hall; 1,116; 26.65%			William Lorimer Hall
Queens	Jordan W. Smith; 1,098; 26.22%	D.C. Mulhall; 997; 23.81%			Jordan W. Smith
Shelburne	Robert Irwin; 1,442; 27.82%	Wendell H. Currie; 1,205; 23.24%			Robert Irwin
Shelburne	Maurice Nickerson; 1,424; 27.47%	W.C. Hall; 1,113; 21.47%			Smith Nickerson†
Yarmouth	Ernest Howard Armstrong; 1,931; 28.36%	Joseph O. Difon; 1,304; 19.15%			Ernest Howard Armstrong
Yarmouth	Henry d'Entremont; 1,839; 27.00%	Howard Corning; 1,736; 25.49%			Howard Corning

=== Fundy-Northeast ===
Electoral district	Candidates				Incumbent
Electoral district	Liberal	Liberal-Conservative	Labour	Other	Incumbent
Colchester	Gilbert H. Vernon; 2,212; 22.62%	Robert H. Kennedy; 2,665; 27.25%			Robert H. Kennedy
Colchester	Frederick B. Schurman; 2,158; 22.07%	Frank Stanfield; 2,745; 28.07%			Frank Stanfield
Cumberland	James Ralston; 3,951; 17.05%	Daniel A. Morrison; 3,620; 15.62%	James B. Nelson; 727; 3.14%		James Ralston
Cumberland	Joshua H. Livingstone; 3,554; 15.33%	James W. Kirkpatrick; 3,791; 16.36%			New seat
Cumberland	Rufus Carter; 3,962; 17.09%	J. Flemming Gilroy; 3,572; 15.41%			Rufus Carter

=== Halifax ===
Electoral district	Candidates				Incumbent
Electoral district	Liberal	Liberal-Conservative	Labour	Other	Incumbent
Halifax	John Brown Douglas; 6,359; 9.78%	Hector MacInnes; 6,735; 10.36%			New seat
Halifax	John L. Connolly; 6,545; 10.06%	John W. Regan; 6,387; 9.82%			New seat
Halifax	George Everett Faulkner; 6,606; 10.16%	Felix P. Quinn; 6,370; 9.79%			George Everett Faulkner
Halifax	Henry Bauld; 6,855; 10.54%	E.F. Williams; 6,266; 9.63%			Fullton Johnson Logan†
Halifax	Robert Emmett Finn; 6,703; 10.31%	F.P. Bligh; 6,213; 9.55%			Robert Emmett Finn

=== Central Nova ===
Electoral district	Candidates				Incumbent
Electoral district	Liberal	Liberal-Conservative	Labour	Other	Incumbent
Antigonish	Fred Robert Trotter; 1,300; 27.16%	Allan MacDonald; 953; 19.91%			Fred Robert Trotter
Antigonish	William Chisholm; 1,366; 28.54%	John Stanfield O'Brien; 1,167; 24.38%			John Stanfield O'Brien
Guysborough	James F. Ellis; 1,752; 29.65%	John Bell; 1,093; 18.50%			James F. Ellis
Guysborough	James Cranswick Tory; 1,827; 30.92%	Duncan S. Chisholm; 1,236; 20.92%			James Cranswick Tory
Pictou	Robert M. McGregor; 4,555; 17.68%	John W. McKay; 4,210; 16.34%	John B. Strickland; 450; 1.75%		Robert M. McGregor
Pictou	Robert Hugh MacKay; 4,309; 16.73%	J. William Sutherland; 3,557; 13.81%			Robert Hugh MacKay
Pictou	Robert Henry Graham; 4,512; 17.52%	**Charles Elliott Tanner**; 4,165; 16.17%			Charles Elliott Tanner

=== Cape Breton ===
Electoral district	Candidates				Incumbent
Electoral district	Liberal	Liberal-Conservative	Labour	Other	Incumbent
Cape Breton	D.J. Hartigan; 6,764; 12.11%	Neil Ferguson; 6,885; 12.33%		J. B. McLachlan (Socialist); 1,038; 1.86%	New seat
Cape Breton	D.C. McDonald; 6,692; 11.98%	Robert Hamilton Butts; 6,935; 12.42%			Robert Hamilton Butts
Cape Breton	Daniel Alexander Cameron; 7,036; 12.60%	Finlay McDonald; 6,721; 12.04%			New seat
Cape Breton	Michael T. Sullivan; 6,390; 11.44%	John Carey Douglas; 7,381; 13.22%			John Carey Douglas
Inverness	Donald MacLennan; 2,655; 26.65%	Thomas Gallant; 2,531; 25.40%			Donald MacLennan
Inverness	John C. Bourinot; 2,540; 25.49%	Duncan F. MacLean; 2,238; 22.46%			James MacDonald†
Richmond	Simon Joyce; 918; 19.60%	Benjamin Amedeé LeBlanc; 1,388; 29.63%			Simon Joyce
Richmond	Alexander Finlayson; 994; 21.22%	John Alexander MacDonald; 1,384; 29.55%			Charles P. Bissett†
Victoria	**George Henry Murray**; 1,212; 27.80%	Joseph Hays; 886; 20.32%			George Henry Murray
Victoria	John Gillis Morrison; 1,189; 27.27%	Phillip McLeod; 1,073; 24.61%			Vacant
