= John Brown Douglas =

Canadian politician from Nova Scotia (1871–1933)

Member of the Nova Scotia House of Assembly for Halifax County
- In office June 19, 1920 – June 24, 1925

Personal details
- Born: February 14, 1871 Masstown, Nova Scotia
- Died: November 17, 1933 (aged 62) Halifax, Nova Scotia
- Party: Liberal
- Spouse: Julia Fordham
- Occupation: merchant, politician

John Brown Douglas (February 14, 1871 – November 17, 1933) was a merchant and political figure in Nova Scotia, Canada. He represented Halifax County in the Nova Scotia House of Assembly from 1920 to 1925 as a Liberal member.

Douglas was born in 1871 at Masstown, Nova Scotia to John Brown Douglas and Jane Faulkner. He was educated at Pictou Academy and married Julia Fordham on June 1, 1897. He served as an alderman in Halifax in 1906–1907, 1909–1910, and 1919, and was president of the Halifax Fire Insurance Company from 1926 to 1933. Douglas died in 1933 at Halifax, Nova Scotia.

Douglas was unsuccessful in the 1916 Nova Scotia general election, was elected in the 1920 Nova Scotia general election, and was unsuccessful in the 1925 Nova Scotia general election.
