= Philip Carteret Hill =

Premier of Nova Scotia from 1875 to 1878

3rd Premier of Nova Scotia
- In office May 11, 1875 – October 15, 1878
- Monarch: Victoria
- Lieutenant Governor: Adams George Archibald
- Preceded by: William Annand
- Succeeded by: Simon Hugh Holmes

17th Mayor of Halifax
- In office 1861–1864
- Preceded by: Samuel Richard Caldwell
- Succeeded by: Matthew Henry Richey

MLA for Halifax County
- In office November 17, 1870 – May 16, 1871 Serving with James Cochran, Henry Balcom, Hugh J. Cameron, Adam C. Bell
- Preceded by: Jeremiah Northup
- Succeeded by: William Garvie; John Taylor; John Flinn; Donald Archibald
- In office December 17, 1874 – September 17, 1878 Serving with Donald Archibald, Edward Farrell
- Preceded by: William Garvie; John Taylor; John Flinn; Donald Archibald
- Succeeded by: Charles J. MacDonald; John Fitzwilliam Stairs; William D. Harrington; John Pugh

Personal details
- Born: August 13, 1821 Halifax, Nova Scotia, Canada
- Died: September 15, 1894 (aged 73) Tunbridge Wells, England, UK
- Party: Liberal
- Spouse: Margaretta Rhoda Collins (m. 1850)
- Education: King's College
- Occupation: Lawyer and writer
- Profession: Politician
- Cabinet: Provincial Secretary (1867) (1874–1878)

Philip Carteret Hill (August 13, 1821 – September 15, 1894) was a Nova Scotia politician who served as the Premier of Nova Scotia. Born in Halifax, he was mayor of Halifax from 1861 to 1864 before entering provincial politics as a supporter of Canadian Confederation in 1867 serving as Provincial Secretary in the Conservative cabinet of Hiram Blanchard but lost his seat in the fall 1867 election that defeated the government.

Hill returned to the legislature in 1870 by winning a by-election as a Liberal-Conservative. He again lost his seat in 1871 but returned in 1874 and served in the Liberal government of William Annand as provincial secretary. Feelings against confederation had abated and Hill was well placed to put forward a compromise position that enabled him to succeed Annand as premier in 1875. However, Hill took over the Liberal government at a time that the federal Liberals were in power under Prime Minister Alexander Mackenzie and becoming increasingly unpopular in Nova Scotia. That, and the failure of the Annand and Hill governments to make progress on railway construction, led to the Liberals' defeat in the 1878 election after which Hill retired from politics. He moved to England in 1882 and published a series theological pamphlets. He died in Tunbridge Wells.
