= 38th Nova Scotia general election =

The 38th Nova Scotia general election may refer to

- the 1925 Nova Scotia general election, the 37th overall general election for Nova Scotia, for the (due to a counting error in 1859) 38th General Assembly of Nova Scotia,
- the 1928 Nova Scotia general election, the 38th overall general election for Nova Scotia, for the 39th General Assembly of Nova Scotia, but considered the 16th general election for the Canadian province of Nova Scotia, or
- the 2009 Nova Scotia general election, the 60th overall general election for Nova Scotia, for the 61st Legislative Assembly of Nova Scotia, but considered the 38th general election for the Canadian province of Nova Scotia.
