= 36th Nova Scotia general election =

The 36th Nova Scotia general election may refer to

- the 1916 Nova Scotia general election, the 35th overall general election for Nova Scotia, for the (due to a counting error in 1859) 36th General Assembly of Nova Scotia,
- the 1920 Nova Scotia general election, the 36th overall general election for Nova Scotia, for the 37th General Assembly of Nova Scotia, but considered the 14th general election for the Canadian province of Nova Scotia, or
- the 2003 Nova Scotia general election, the 58th overall general election for Nova Scotia, for the 58th Legislative Assembly of Nova Scotia, but considered the 36th general election for the Canadian province of Nova Scotia.
