= 37th Nova Scotia general election =

The 37th Nova Scotia general election may refer to

- the 1920 Nova Scotia general election, the 36th overall general election for Nova Scotia, for the (due to a counting error in 1859) 37th General Assembly of Nova Scotia,
- the 1925 Nova Scotia general election, the 37th overall general election for Nova Scotia, for the 38th General Assembly of Nova Scotia, but considered the 15th general election for the Canadian province of Nova Scotia, or
- the 2006 Nova Scotia general election, the 59th overall general election for Nova Scotia, for the 60th Legislative Assembly of Nova Scotia, but considered the 37th general election for the Canadian province of Nova Scotia.
