= William Stevens Fielding =

Canadian politician (1848–1929)

The Right Honourable William Stevens Fielding PC
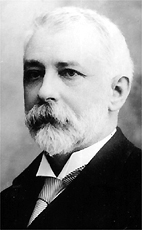

7th Premier of Nova Scotia
- In office 28 July 1884 – 18 July 1896
- Monarch: Victoria
- Lieutenant Governor: Matthew Henry Richey; Archibald McLelan; Malachy Bowes Daly
- Preceded by: William Thomas Pipes
- Succeeded by: George Henry Murray

MLA for Halifax County
- In office 20 June 1882 – 18 July 1896 Serving with William D. Harrington, Angus A. Buchanan, William Roche, Jr., Michael Joseph Power, William A. Black
- Preceded by: Charles J. MacDonald; John F. Stairs; William D. Harrington; John Pugh
- Succeeded by: William Bernard Wallace

Member of the Canadian Parliament for Shelburne and Queen's
- In office 5 August 1896 – 21 September 1911
- Preceded by: Francis Gordon Forbes
- Succeeded by: Fleming Blanchard McCurdy
- In office 17 December 1917 – 29 October 1925
- Preceded by: Fleming Blanchard McCurdy
- Succeeded by: District abolished

Personal details
- Born: 24 November 1848 Halifax, Nova Scotia
- Died: 23 June 1929 (aged 80) Ottawa
- Party: Nova Scotia Liberal Party
- Other political affiliations: Liberal; Unionist Party
- Spouse: Hester Rankine (m. 1876)
- Children: 4 daughters and 1 son
- Education: Dalhousie University
- Occupation: Journalist
- Profession: Politician
- Cabinet: Minister of Finance (1896–1911) (1921–1925); Minister of Railways and Canals (acting) (1903–1904) (1907)

William Stevens Fielding, PC (24 November 1848 – 23 June 1929) was a Canadian Liberal politician, the seventh premier of Nova Scotia (1884–96), and the federal Minister of Finance from 1896 to 1911 and again from 1921 to 1925.

== Early life ==
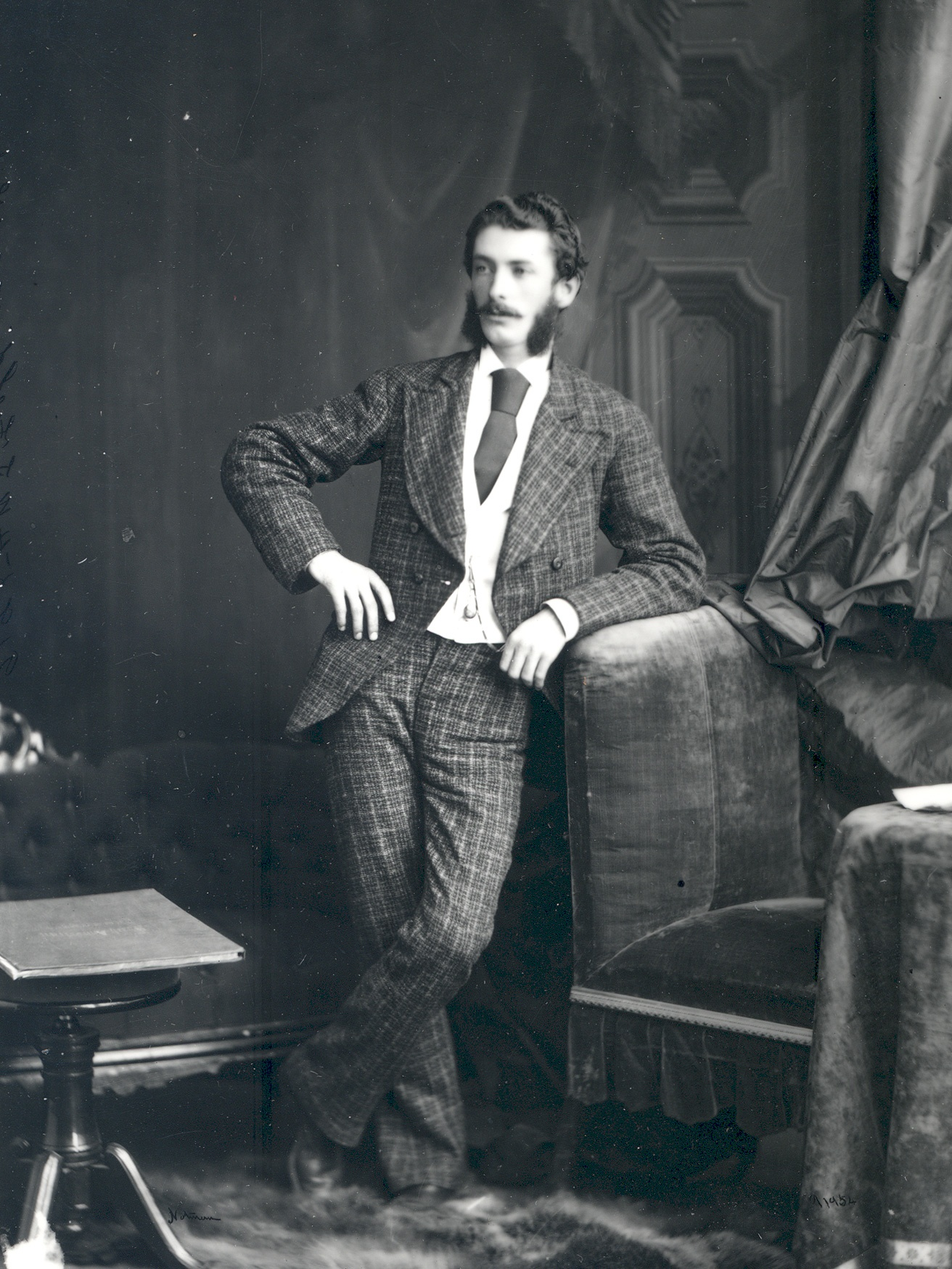
Fielding as Halifax Morning Chronicle reporter, around the time he reported on the SS Atlantic disaster, 1873

He was born in Halifax, Nova Scotia. Fielding became leader of the Anti-Confederation Party (Nova Scotia Liberal Party). In 1884, he became Premier and won the 1886 election on a pledge to remove Nova Scotia from confederation. When he failed to do this, he turned to economic matters including developing the coal industry.

The Liberal Party of Nova Scotia fared poorly in national elections during the 1880s and early 1890s. The national party advocated policies that would discontinue the national coal subsidy and, for all practical purposes, eliminate Catholic schools in Manitoba, policies disliked by provincial coal miners and Catholics respectively. Fielding forged a more moderate coal policy and defused the school issue, winning back Catholics. Thus in 1896 the provincial Liberals improved their showing in the national election.

== Federal politics ==
In 1896, he left provincial politics to become Minister of Finance in the Liberal government of Sir Wilfrid Laurier. In 1910, he negotiated a reciprocity or free trade agreement with the United States which led to the government's defeat in the 1911 general election. Fielding lost his seat, and became editor of the Daily Telegraph of Montreal.

== First World War ==
Fielding supported the Unionist government of Sir Robert Borden during the Conscription Crisis of 1917 and returned to the House of Commons as a Liberal-Unionist member.

== Liberal leadership convention, 1919 ==
Fielding had widely been seen as Laurier's successor but his split with the party over the conscription issue cost him the 1919 Liberal leadership convention where he lost to William Lyon Mackenzie King by 38 votes.

== Service in Mackenzie King's first Administration ==
He served again as Minister of Finance in King's first government formed after the 1921 election. Fielding's health began to deteriorate in the years after the election, and while he nominally remained as Finance Minister through King's first parliamentary term, Minister of Trade and Commerce James Robb effectively took over the role from late 1923 onwards. King's government fell in September 1925 when parliament unexpectedly voted to reject that year's budget. Fielding, recognising that he would likely not survive another full parliamentary term and that his political career was at its end, publicly took responsibility for the rejection of the budget, announcing his resignation as Finance Minister and that he would not seek re-election, saving Robb (who had actually been responsible for getting the budget passed) from having to resign.

== Later life ==
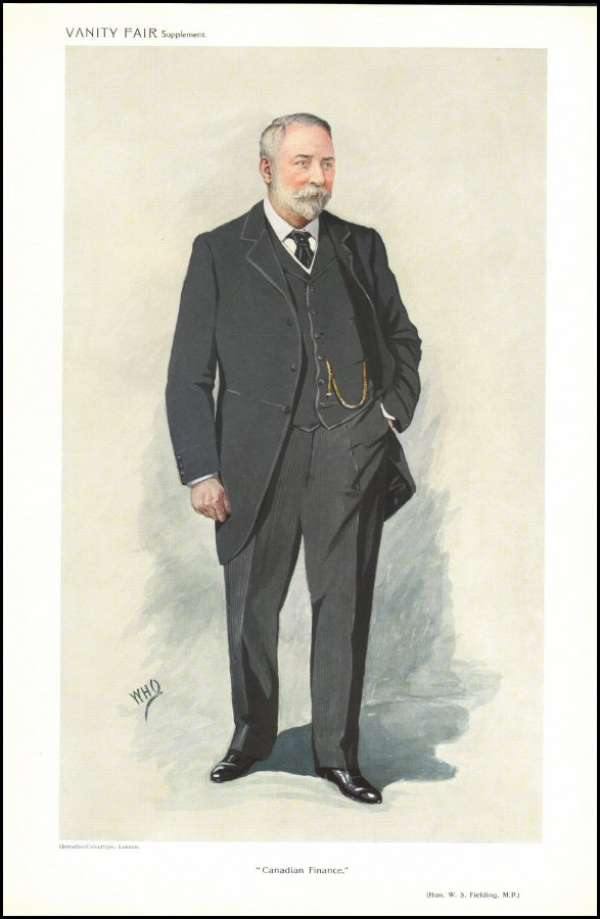
Fielding caricatured by WHO for Vanity Fair, 1909

In the 1923 Birthday Honours, Fielding was sworn into the Privy Council of the United Kingdom allowing him to be styled as Right Honourable, a rare privilege among Canadians who have not served as Prime Minister, Governor-General, or Chief Justice of Canada.

He died in Ottawa.
