= 39th Nova Scotia general election =

The 39th Nova Scotia general election may refer to

- the 1928 Nova Scotia general election, the 38th overall general election for Nova Scotia, for the (due to a counting error in 1859) 39th General Assembly of Nova Scotia,
- the 1933 Nova Scotia general election, the 39th overall general election for Nova Scotia, for the 40th General Assembly of Nova Scotia, but considered the 17th general election for the Canadian province of Nova Scotia, or
- the 2013 Nova Scotia general election, the 61st overall general election for Nova Scotia, for the 62nd Legislative Assembly of Nova Scotia, but considered the 39th general election for the Canadian province of Nova Scotia.
