= George Mitchell =

George Mitchell may refer to:

== Entertainment ==
- George Mitchell (jazz musician) (1899–1972), American jazz cornet player of the 1920s
- George Mitchell (actor) (1905–1972), American film and television actor
- George Mitchell (Scottish musician) (1917–2002), Scottish singer, 1950s–1970s
- George Mitchell (music historian) (born 1944), American record producer, blues

== Sports ==
- George Mitchell (cricketer) (1897–?), English cricketer
- George Mitchell (baseball) (1900–1953), American Negro league baseball player
- George Mitchell (water polo) (1901–1988), American water polo player
- George Mitchell (referee) (1912–?), Scottish football referee

== Politics ==
=== United States ===
- George Edward Mitchell (1781–1832), Congressman from Maryland
- George Mitchell (Wisconsin politician) (1822–1908), member of the Wisconsin State Senate
- George A. Mitchell (1824–1878), American politician and businessman
- George Edwin Mitchell (1844–1911), mayor of Chelsea, Massachusetts
- George J. Mitchell (born 1933), United States senator from Maine and United States Special Envoy for Northern Ireland

=== Elsewhere ===
- George Mitchell (Canadian politician) (1846–1908), Canadian politician from Nova Scotia
- George Mitchell (Rhodesian politician) (1867–1937), Prime Minister of Southern Rhodesia
- George Mitchell (New Zealand politician) (1877–1939), New Zealand politician
- George Herbert Mitchell (1888 or 1889–1980), Canadian politician in the Ontario legislature
- George Mitchell (Australian politician) (1894–1961), member of the New South Wales Legislative Assembly
- George M. Mitchell (born 1932), lawyer and former political figure in Nova Scotia

== Other ==
- George Mitchell (trade unionist) (1827–1901), leader of the National Agricultural Labourers' Union in England
- George Mitchell (priest) (1835–?), missionary priest of the Anglican Church serving in the South Africa
- George Arthur Mitchell (1860–1948), Scottish businessman
- George W. Mitchell (1904–1997), American economist, former Federal Reserve Vice Chairman
- George Hoole Mitchell (1902–1976), British geologist
- George Francis Mitchell (1912–1997), Irish geologist and naturalist
- George Allan Mitchell (1911–1944), English recipient of the Victoria Cross
  - George Mitchell School, school in London named after George Allan Mitchell V.C.
- George P. Mitchell (1919–2013), American businessman, real estate developer, and pioneer of shale gas technology
- George Mitchell (criminal) (fl. 1980s–2020s), Irish criminal nicknamed "The Penguin"
