= Adam Dunlap Burris =

Canadian politician from Nova Scotia (1887–1950)

Member of the Nova Scotia House of Assembly for Halifax County
- In office July 27, 1920 – June 24, 1925

Personal details
- Born: February 28, 1887 Upper Musquodoboit, Nova Scotia
- Died: February 21, 1950 (aged 62) Upper Musquodoboit, Nova Scotia
- Party: Liberal
- Spouse(s): Jean Archibald; Mary Jane McCurdy
- Occupation: farmer, stipendiary magistrate, politician

Adam Dunlap Burris (February 28, 1887 – February 21, 1950) was a farmer and political figure in Nova Scotia, Canada. He represented Halifax County in the Nova Scotia House of Assembly from 1920 to 1925 as a Liberal member.

Burris was born in 1887 at Upper Musquodoboit, Nova Scotia to George Burris and Jane Dean. He married Jean Archibald on December 27, 1911, and later married Mary Jane McCurdy on January 23, 1918. He served as a stipendiary magistrate. Burris died in 1950 at Upper Musquodoboit.

He was elected in the 1920 Nova Scotia general election and did not contest the 1925 Nova Scotia general election.
