= Walter J. A. O'Hearn =

Canadian politician from Nova Scotia (1879–1933)

Walter Joseph Aloysius O'Hearn KC

Member of the Nova Scotia House of Assembly for Halifax County
- In office January 16, 1923 – June 24, 1925

Attorney General of Nova Scotia
- In office December 21, 1922 – 1925

Judge of the County Court for Halifax County
- In office April 26, 1928 – May 3, 1933

Personal details
- Born: October 31, 1879 Dartmouth, Nova Scotia
- Died: May 3, 1933 (aged 53) Halifax, Nova Scotia
- Party: Liberal
- Spouse: Catherine Mahoney
- Education: Dalhousie University (LLB)
- Occupation: barrister, politician, judge

Walter Joseph Aloysius O'Hearn KC (October 31, 1879 – May 3, 1933) was a barrister and political figure in Nova Scotia, Canada. He served as Attorney General of Nova Scotia from 1923 to 1925, and represented Halifax County in the Nova Scotia House of Assembly from 1923 to 1925 as a Liberal member.

O'Hearn was born in 1879 at Dartmouth, Nova Scotia to Peter O'Hearn and Mary Chisholm. He was educated at Dalhousie University, receiving an Bachelor of Laws in 1900, and was appointed King's Counsel. He married Catherine Mahoney, daughter of William B. Mahoney of Halifax, Nova Scotia, on October 13, 1909. O'Hearn was appointed Attorney General of Nova Scotia in December 1922 and Commissioner of Crown Lands in January 1923. In 1928, he was appointed judge of the County Court for Halifax County, serving until his death in 1933.

O'Hearn was elected by acclamation in a by-election on January 16, 1923, when Robert Emmett Finn resigned to contest a federal by-election. O'Hearn was unsuccessful in the 1925 Nova Scotia general election.
