= William Drysdale Piercey =

Canadian politician from Nova Scotia (1877–1964)

Member of the Nova Scotia House of Assembly for Halifax County
- In office June 25, 1925 – September 30, 1928

Personal details
- Born: June 9, 1877 Halifax, Nova Scotia
- Died: January 22, 1964 (aged 86) Halifax, Nova Scotia
- Party: Liberal Conservative
- Spouse(s): Annie Margaret Forbes; Elsie MacPeart
- Occupation: lumber merchant, real estate dealer, politician

William Drysdale Piercey (June 9, 1877 – January 22, 1964) was a lumber merchant, real estate dealer, and political figure in Nova Scotia, Canada. He represented Halifax County in the Nova Scotia House of Assembly from 1925 to 1928 as a Liberal Conservative member.

Piercey was born in 1877 at Halifax, Nova Scotia to Charles Edward Piercey and Eleanor Jane Drysdale. He was educated at the Maritime Business College. He married Annie Margaret Forbes on September 16, 1903, in Halifax, and later married Elsie MacPeart. Piercey served as manager and director of the Halifax branch of Rhodes Curry & Company from 1895 to 1915 and established Piercey Supply Ltd. in 1915. He was appointed a justice of the peace in 1921 and later served as a commissioner of the Supreme Court of Nova Scotia. Piercey died in 1964 at Halifax.

He was elected in the 1925 Nova Scotia general election and did not contest the 1928 Nova Scotia general election.
