= George Henry Murphy =

Canadian politician from Nova Scotia (1875–1958)

Member of the Nova Scotia House of Assembly for Halifax County
- In office January 21, 1930 – August 21, 1933

Minister without portfolio
- In office 1929–1930

Minister of Health (Nova Scotia)
- In office August 11, 1930 – September 5, 1933

Personal details
- Born: December 10, 1875 Ohio, Antigonish County, Nova Scotia
- Died: March 7, 1958 (aged 82) Halifax, Nova Scotia
- Party: Liberal Conservative
- Spouse: Helene Josephine Macneil
- Education: St. Francis Xavier University (BA); Dalhousie University (MD)
- Occupation: physician, surgeon, politician

George Henry Murphy (December 10, 1875 – March 7, 1958) was a physician, surgeon, and political figure in Nova Scotia, Canada. He represented Halifax County in the Nova Scotia House of Assembly from 1930 to 1933 as a Liberal Conservative member.

Murphy was born in 1875 at Ohio, Antigonish County to Peter William Murphy and Bridget Carter. He was educated at St. Francis Xavier University completing a Bachelor of Arts, and Dalhousie University with a Doctor of Medicine, completing postgraduate work in London, England from 1908 to 1909. He married Helene Josephine Macneil on January 7, 1904. He served as professor of clinical surgery at the Dalhousie Medical School from 1916 to 1949. Murphy served as Minister without portfolio from 1929 to 1930 and as Minister of Health from 1930 to 1933. He died in 1958 at Halifax, Nova Scotia.

Murphy was elected in a by-election on January 21, 1930, after the death of John Francis Mahoney, but was unsuccessful in the 1933 Nova Scotia general election.
