= Edward Cragg =

Edward Cragg may refer to:

- Edward Cragg (pilot) (1918–1943), American fighter ace of World War II
- Edward Joseph Cragg (1887–1953), civil servant, businessman and political figure in Nova Scotia, Canada
