= Angus MacDonald Morton =

Canadian politician and physician from Nova Scotia (1871–1944)

Member of the Nova Scotia House of Assembly for Halifax County
- In office October 1, 1928 – August 21, 1933

Personal details
- Born: November 14, 1871 Middlefield, Nova Scotia
- Died: October 26, 1944 (aged 72) Halifax, Nova Scotia
- Party: Liberal Conservative
- Spouse: Bessie Amelia Reid
- Education: Dalhousie University (MD)
- Occupation: physician, surgeon, politician

Angus MacDonald Morton (November 14, 1871 – October 26, 1944) was a physician, surgeon, and political figure in Nova Scotia, Canada. He represented Halifax County in the Nova Scotia House of Assembly from 1928 to 1933 as a Liberal Conservative member.

Morton was born in 1871 at Middlefield, Nova Scotia to Allan Morton and Lydia Anne Blenus. He was educated at Dalhousie University, completing an Doctor of Medicine in 1898. He married Bessie Amelia Reid on September 25, 1900. He served as a Halifax County councillor from 1914 to 1919. Morton died in 1944 at Halifax, Nova Scotia.

He was elected in the 1928 Nova Scotia general election and was unsuccessful in the 1933 Nova Scotia general election in Halifax West.
