= Alexander Montgomerie (politician) =

Scottish-Canadian politician from Nova Scotia (1882–1932)

Alexander Montgomerie CBE

Member of the Nova Scotia House of Assembly for Halifax County
- In office June 25, 1925 – September 30, 1928

Personal details
- Born: November 4, 1882 Greenock, Scotland
- Died: June 3, 1932 (aged 49) Halifax, Nova Scotia
- Party: Liberal Conservative
- Spouse: Willena MacKay
- Occupation: shipping executive, politician

Alexander Montgomerie CBE (November 4, 1882 – June 3, 1932) was a shipping executive and political figure in Nova Scotia, Canada. He represented Halifax County in the Nova Scotia House of Assembly from 1925 to 1928 as a Liberal Conservative member.

Montgomerie was born in 1882 at Greenock, Scotland, to Hugh Montgomerie and Janet Maitland, who immigrated to Canada in 1883. He married Willena MacKay on June 1, 1910. During the First World War, he served as a lieutenant-colonel in the Royal Newfoundland Regiment from 1916 to 1919 as a district officer commanding Newfoundland. He later served as manager of Furness Withy & Co. Montgomerie was appointed an Officer of the Order of the British Empire in 1918 and a Commander of the Order of the British Empire in 1919. He died in 1932 at Halifax, Nova Scotia.

He was elected in the 1925 Nova Scotia general election but was unsuccessful in the 1928 Nova Scotia general election.
