= George Everett Faulkner =

Canadian politician

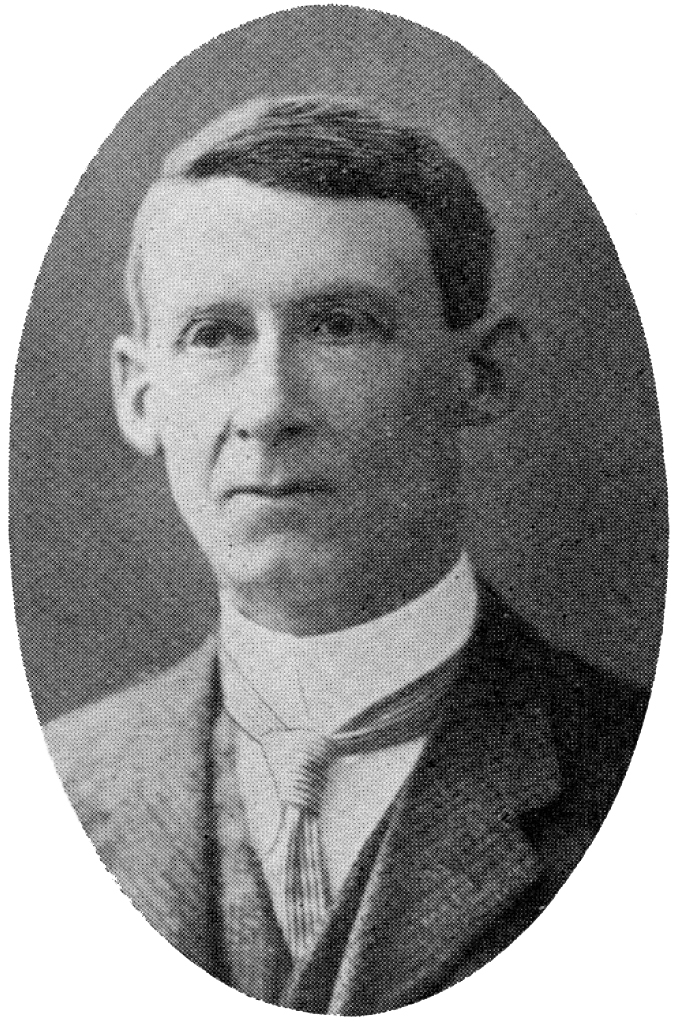
- Faulkner in 1909

Speaker of the House of Assembly of Nova Scotia
- In office February 24, 1910 – May 15, 1911
- Preceded by: Edward Matthew Farrell
- Succeeded by: James F. Ellis

Minister Without Portfolio
- In office 1911–1920
- Appointed by: George Henry Murray

Member of the Nova Scotia House of Assembly for Halifax
- In office 1906–1920

Personal details
- Born: January 31, 1855 Glenholme, Nova Scotia
- Died: May 2, 1931 (aged 76) Halifax, Nova Scotia
- Party: Liberal
- Spouse: Laura Guille (m. 1883)
- Occupation: businessman

George Everett Faulkner (January 31, 1855 – May 2, 1931) was a Canadian businessman, accountant and politician from the province of Nova Scotia. He served as a member of the Nova Scotia House of Assembly, including as Speaker of the Nova Scotia House of Assembly and a member of cabinet in the George Henry Murray government.

== Early life ==
Faulkner was born January 31, 1855, in Folly Village, Glenholme, Nova Scotia to Thomas Faulkner and Arabella Morrison. Faulkner began working for the Dun, Wiman and Company in 1876, and started his own business Faulkner and Company in the 1890s.

== Political life ==
Faulkner served as an alderman on Halifax Council from 1896–1901.

Faulkner was elected as a Liberal to the Nova Scotia House of Assembly in the district of Halifax in the 1906 Nova Scotia general election. Faulkner served as Speaker of the Nova Scotia House of Assembly from February 24, 1910 to May 15, 1911 after Speaker Edward Matthew Farrell was appointed to the Senate.

Faulkner was reelected to the Assembly in the 1911 and 1916 general elections. After the 1911 election, he was named minister without portfolio in the George Henry Murray government.

In the run up to the 1920 Nova Scotia general election, Faulkner failed to gain the nomination of the Liberal Party for Halifax, finishing 7 out of 8 on the party ballot, ending his political career. Historian Barry Cahill was unable to find a definitive reason for Faulkner's failure to gain the nomination, but noted his popularity was likely diminished from his support of Robert Borden's Unionist government, and his opposition to Irish Home Rule movement, which was popular in the province.

== Later life ==
After politics, Faulkner returned to his business. His health began to fail due to heart disease, and he died on May 2, 1931, at the age of 76.
