= Fulton Johnson Logan =

Canadian politician from Nova Scotia (1857–1939)

Member of the Nova Scotia House of Assembly for Halifax County
- In office June 14, 1911 – May 16, 1916

Member of the Legislative Council of Nova Scotia
- In office May 17, 1916 – May 31, 1928

Personal details
- Born: November 5, 1857 Upper Stewiacke, Nova Scotia
- Died: February 9, 1939 (aged 81) Halifax, Nova Scotia
- Party: Liberal
- Spouse: Annie M. Sutherland
- Occupation: lumberman, farmer, politician

Fulton Johnson Logan (November 5, 1857 – February 9, 1939) was a lumberman, farmer, and political figure in Nova Scotia, Canada. He represented Halifax County in the Nova Scotia House of Assembly from 1911 to 1916 as a Liberal member.

Logan was born in 1857 at Upper Stewiacke, Nova Scotia to William Logan and Mary Archibald. He married Annie M. Sutherland on September 15, 1892. He served as a councillor for Colchester County from 1891 to 1892. Logan was appointed to the Legislative Council of Nova Scotia on May 17, 1916, serving until its abolition on May 31, 1928. He died in 1939 at Halifax, Nova Scotia.

He was elected in the 1911 Nova Scotia general election but did not contest the 1916 Nova Scotia general election.
