= George Mitchell (cricketer) =

English cricketer

Personal information
- Full name: George Frederick Mitchell
- Born: 8 February 1897; Canning Town, Essex, England
- Batting: Left-handed
- Bowling: Unknown

Domestic team information
- Years: Team
- 1926: Essex

Career statistics
| Competition | First-class |
|---|---|
| Matches | 1 |
| Runs scored | 4 |
| Batting average | 4.00 |
| 100s/50s | –/– |
| Top score | 4 |
| Balls bowled | 102 |
| Wickets | 1 |
| Bowling average | 45.00 |
| 5 wickets in innings | – |
| 10 wickets in match | – |
| Best bowling | 1/25 |
| Catches/stumpings | –/– |
- Source: Cricinfo, 28 October 2011

George Frederick Mitchell (18 February 1897 – date of death unknown) was an English cricketer. Mitchell was a left-handed batsman, though his bowling style is unknown. He was born at Canning Town, Essex.

Mitchell made a single first-class appearance for Essex against Oxford University in 1926. He took a single wicket in the match, that of George Newman. He batted once, batting at number eleven he scored 4 runs before being dismissed by John Greenstock.
