= George Mitchell (Canadian politician) =

Canadian politician from Nova Scotia (1846–1908)

Member of the Nova Scotia House of Assembly for Halifax County
- In office April 20, 1897 – June 19, 1906

Personal details
- Born: June 13, 1846 Halifax, Nova Scotia
- Died: September 1, 1908 (aged 62) Halifax, Nova Scotia
- Party: Liberal
- Spouse(s): Christian MacGregor; Ida May Bowes
- Occupation: merchant, politician

George Mitchell (June 13, 1846 – September 1, 1908) was amerchant and political figure in Nova Scotia, Canada. He represented Halifax County in the Nova Scotia House of Assembly from 1897 to 1906 as a Liberal member.

Mitchell was born in 1846 at Halifax, Nova Scotia to George P. Mitchell and Anna McColl. He was educated at Halifax Grammar School. He married Christian MacGregor, and later married Ida May Bowes on September 15, 1891. He served as president of the Acadia Fire Insurance Company, a director of the Union Bank, and president of the Halifax Board of Trade. Mitchell died in 1908 at Halifax.

He was elected in the 1897 Nova Scotia general election and re-elected in the 1901 Nova Scotia general election, and did not contest the 1906 Nova Scotia general election.
