= Walter Mosher =

Canadian politician (1871–1955)

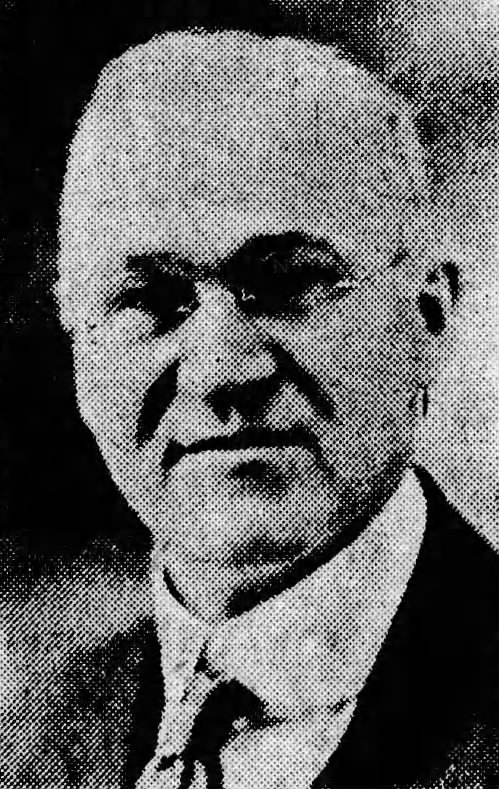

20th Mayor of Dartmouth
- In office 1922–1925
- Preceded by: I.W. Vidito
- Succeeded by: Charles A. McLean

22nd Mayor of Dartmouth
- In office 1928–1933
- Preceded by: Charles A. McLean
- Succeeded by: Walter A. Topple

24th Mayor of Dartmouth
- In office 1936–1937
- Preceded by: Walter A. Topple
- Succeeded by: L.J. Isnor

Personal details
- Born: Walter Mosher; May 19, 1871 Nova Scotia, Canada
- Died: June 27, 1955 (aged 84) Halifax, Nova Scotia
- Party: Halifax Labor Party
- Profession: Politician

Walter Mosher (May 19, 1871 – June 27, 1955) was a Canadian politician and retired building contractor.

== Early life ==
Walter Mosher was born on May 19, 1871, in the Canadian province of Nova Scotia.

== Politics ==
=== Councillor ===
Mosher started his career in municipal politics in 1910, serving as Dartmouth's Ward 1 councillor until 1913. In 1914, he was re-elected to represent Ward 1 until 1915, when he lost to Harold A. Russell. He was elected again in 1916 and served as a member of Dartmouth Town Council until 1920.

=== Mayor ===
Mosher was first elected mayor of the town of Dartmouth, Nova Scotia, on February 7, 1922, and held the position until 1925. He defeated Colonel I.V. Vidito, who was reoffering for a second term.

In 1925, Mosher was the president of the Halifax Labor Party.

By a majority of 1,385 votes, he was re-elected as the 22nd mayor of the Town of Dartmouth on February 7, 1928. He served from 1928 to 1933. Elected February 5, 1936, Mosher was once again the Mayor of Dartmouth.

== Death ==
Mosher died on June 27, 1955, in Halifax, Nova Scotia at the age of 84.
