= Donald Archibald =

Canadian politician

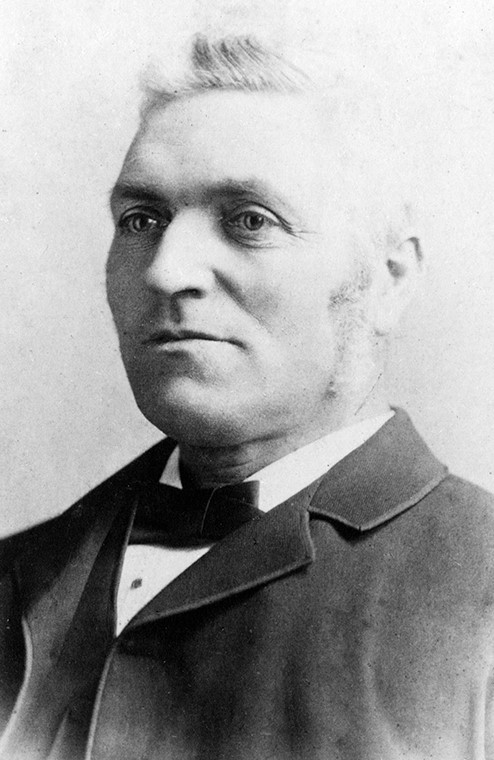

MLA for Halifax County
- In office 1871–1878

Personal details
- Born: August 16, 1840 Musquodoboit, Nova Scotia
- Died: September 9, 1908 (aged 68) Halifax, Nova Scotia
- Party: Nova Scotia Liberal Party
- Occupation: farmer

Donald Archibald (August 16, 1840 – September 1908) was a politician and farmer in Nova Scotia. He represented Halifax County in the Nova Scotia House of Assembly from 1871 to 1878 as a Liberal member.

He was born in Musquodoboit, Nova Scotia, the son of Matthew Archibald and Jane Grant, and worked on the family farm for seven years after leaving school at the age of thirteen. Archibald spent two years prospecting for gold in the province before purchasing his own farm. In 1865, he married Grizell McLachlan. He was named a justice of the peace and served on the council for Halifax County, being chosen as county warden in 1881. He was unsuccessful in a bid for reelection to the provincial assembly in 1878. He died in Halifax at the age of 68. He was high sheriff at the time of his death.
