= William D. Harrington =

Canadian politician

William D. Harrington (June 22, 1832 – April 15, 1904) was a merchant and political figure in Nova Scotia, Canada. He represented Halifax County in the Nova Scotia House of Assembly from 1878 to 1886 as a Liberal-Conservative member.

He was born in Antigonish, Nova Scotia, the son of Aaron DeWolf Harrington and Rebecca Purcell. Harrington was married three times: first to Amy Northrop, then to Jean Lydiard and finally to his cousin Elizabeth Harrington Wadsworth. He was a grocer. Harrington served as customs collector from 1888 to 1904. He died in Halifax at the age of 71.
