= John Pugh (Canadian politician) =

Canadian politician

John Pugh (August 1821 – September 23, 1900) was an Irish-born merchant and politician in Nova Scotia, Canada. He represented Halifax County in the Nova Scotia House of Assembly as a Conservative member from 1878 to 1882.

He was born in Dublin, the son of Thomas Pugh and Ann Burns, and was educated there. Pugh went to sea at the age of 13 and was a ship's captain from 1843 to 1857. In 1850, he married Alice Saunders. Pugh served as a member of the province's Board of Works from 1864 to 1867. He served on the school board for Halifax. He ran unsuccessfully for reelection to the provincial assembly in 1882. He died in Halifax.
