= Edward Joseph Cragg =

Canadian politician (1887–1953)

Edward Joseph Cragg (March 19, 1887 – January 22, 1953) was a civil servant, businessman and political figure in Nova Scotia, Canada. He represented Halifax County in the Nova Scotia House of Assembly from 1928 to 1930 as a Liberal member.

He was the son of Francis J. Cragg and Rose Cornelia Patton. Cragg was educated at the La Salle Academy in Halifax. He married Loretta Ethel Donahoe. Cragg worked with the federal Geological Department, then worked as a clerk and later established his own business. In 1930, he resigned as a member of the provincial assembly to run (unsuccessfully) for a federal seat. Cragg was mayor of Halifax from 1934 to 1937. He was manager of the Nova Scotia Power Commission from 1938 to 1953, when he died in Halifax at the age of 65.
