= Harry H. Wickwire =

Canadian politician

Harry Hamm Wickwire (June 21, 1868 – November 26, 1922) was a lawyer and political figure in Nova Scotia, Canada. He represented Kings County in the Nova Scotia House of Assembly from 1894 to 1922 as a Liberal member.

He was born in Canning, Nova Scotia, the son of J. L. Wickwire and a descendant of Planter's, and was educated at Acadia College and Dalhousie College. In 1895, he married Sarah J. Lovitt. Wickwire served as Crown attorney for Kings County.
