= John Archibald Walker =

Canadian politician (1890–1977)

John Archibald Walker (February 8, 1890 – November 22, 1977) was a lawyer and political figure in Nova Scotia, Canada. He represented Halifax County in the Nova Scotia House of Assembly from 1925 to 1928 as a Liberal-Conservative member.

He was born in West Lake Ainslie, Inverness County, Nova Scotia, the son of John Walker and Anne Walker. He was educated at St. Francis Xavier University, the Catholic University of America and Dalhousie University. In 1922, he married Josephine McLennan. Walker was named King's Counsel in 1932. He lived in Halifax and served as a director for several companies. Walker was Minister of Natural Resources and Provincial Development from 1925 to 1928 in the Executive Council of Nova Scotia. In 1958, he was named a Knight of Saint Gregory.

He was president of the Boys Scouts Association of Nova Scotia and was presented with the Silver Acorn by the Governor General. He was the recipient of honorary degrees from Saint Mary's University and St. Francis Xavier University.

Walker died in Halifax on November 22, 1977.
