= John Doull =

Canadian politician

The Honourable John Doull (November 1, 1878 – October 27, 1969) was a lawyer, judge, and politician. He represented Pictou County in the Nova Scotia House of Assembly as a Conservative member from 1925 to 1933.

He was born in New Glasgow, Nova Scotia, the son of James Forbes Doull (of the North British Society and the son of a Scottish immigrant whose name was also John Doull), and Christina McLellan. He was educated in New Glasgow and at Dalhousie University (LLB 1910), on the Board of Governors of which he was later to serve. He worked in his father's grocery business and then as a bookkeeper before returning to Dalhousie to study law. Doull was admitted to the Nova Scotia bar in 1910 and went on to practice in Glace Bay and New Glasgow. From 1914 to 1925, he was solicitor for the town of Trenton. He served in the province's Executive Council as minister without portfolio from 1928 to 1931 and Attorney General from 1931 to 1933. He was a judge in the Supreme Court of Nova Scotia from 1933 to 1961. He was also president of the Nova Scotia Historical Society.

He married Irene McGregor in 1916. Their children were the naval engineer John Doull, the musician and scholar in French Mary Doull, and the philosopher James Doull. He died in Halifax.

He published the following historical books:

- Angus McGillivray, D.D. (1938)
- A History of the Bible Society in Nova Scotia, 1813-1963 (1963)
- Sketches of the Attorney Generals of Nova Scotia, 1750-1926 (1964)

== Bibliography ==
- Marble, AE Nova Scotians at home and abroad: biographical sketches ... (1977) pp. 145-6 ISBN 0-88999-074-3
- Allison, D & Tuck, CE History of Nova Scotia, Vol. 3 (1916) pp. 669-70
