= James F. Ellis =

Canadian politician (1869–1937)

James Fraser Ellis

MLA for Guysborough County
- In office 1904–1920

Speaker of the Nova Scotia House of Assembly
- In office 1912–1916
- Preceded by: Edward Matthew Farrell
- Succeeded by: Robert Irwin

Personal details
- Born: June 11, 1869 Upper Stewiacke, Nova Scotia
- Died: April 3, 1937 (aged 67) Ottawa, Ontario
- Party: Liberal
- Occupation: physician

James Fraser Ellis (June 11, 1869 – April 3, 1937) was a physician and political figure in Nova Scotia, Canada. He represented Guysborough County in the Nova Scotia House of Assembly from 1904 to 1920 as a Liberal member.

He was born in Upper Stewiacke, Nova Scotia, the son of William Ellis and Margaret Fraser. He was educated at the Pictou Academy and Western University. Ellis set up practice at Sherbrooke. In 1901, he married Alice L. Stewart. He was first elected to the provincial assembly in a 1904 by-election held after John Howard Sinclair was elected to the House of Commons. Ellis married Ethel Anderson in 1907, after the death of his first wife. He was named speaker for the provincial assembly in February, 1912, serving until 1916. Ellis served in the army medical corps during World War I. He was named to the Federal Pensions Board in 1920 and moved to Ottawa. He died there are the age of 66.
