= John L. MacIsaac =

Canadian politician (1870–1941)

John Laughlin MacIsaac (June 3, 1870 – March 24, 1941) was a Canadian physician and political figure in Nova Scotia. He represented Antigonish County in the Nova Scotia House of Assembly from 1925 to 1941. He was a member of the Nova Scotia Liberal Party.

He was born in Dunmore, Antigonish County, Nova Scotia, the son of Laughlin MacIsaac and Mary MacIsaac. He was educated at St. Francis Xavier University and the University of Maryland, College Park. MacIsaac was a fellow of the American College of Physicians and Surgeons. He practised in Antigonish and died in office there at the age of 70.
