= John Francis Mahoney =

Canadian politician (1894–1929)

John Francis Mahoney (December 17, 1894 – September 2, 1929) was a lawyer and political figure in Nova Scotia, Canada. He represented Halifax County in the Nova Scotia House of Assembly from 1925 to 1929 as a Liberal-Conservative member.

He was the son of Dennis Mahoney and Mary Nelligan. Mahoney was educated at Dalhousie University. He served overseas during World War I. Mahoney served in the province's Executive Council as Minister of Natural Resources and Provincial Development from 1928 to 1929. He died in office in a motor vehicle accident in Halifax.
