= George Henry Murray =

Premier of Nova Scotia from 1896 to 1923

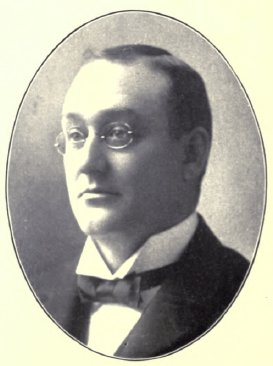
- Murray in 1901

8th Premier of Nova Scotia
- In office July 20, 1896 – January 24, 1923
- Monarchs: Victoria; Edward VII; George V
- Lieutenant Governor: Malachy Bowes Daly; Alfred Gilpin Jones; Duncan C. Fraser; James D. McGregor; David MacKeen; MacCallum Grant
- Preceded by: William Stevens Fielding
- Succeeded by: Ernest Howard Armstrong

MLA for Victoria County
- In office August 15, 1896 – January 24, 1923 Serving with John G. Morrison, Angus A. Buchanan, Angus G. Buchanan
- Preceded by: John Lemuel Bethune
- Succeeded by: Daniel Alexander Cameron

Personal details
- Born: June 7, 1861 Grand Narrows, Nova Scotia
- Died: January 6, 1929 (aged 67) Montreal, Quebec
- Party: Liberal
- Spouse: Grace Elizabeth Moore (m. 1889)
- Children: George Belcher Murray
- Education: Boston University
- Occupation: teacher, lawyer
- Profession: politician

George Henry Murray (June 7, 1861 – January 6, 1929) was a Nova Scotia politician who served as the eighth premier of Nova Scotia for 26 years and 188 days, the longest unbroken tenure for a head of government in Canadian history.

== Early life and career ==
Murray was born in Grand Narrows, Nova Scotia. He was a member of the North British Society.

Despite his later political longevity, Murray's early political career was marked by inability to get elected. He lost five consecutive elections at the federal and provincial level before he finally won a seat. Despite his electoral failures he was highly regarded within the Nova Scotia Liberal Party and was nominated by Nova Scotia Premier William Stevens Fielding as his successor after Fielding left provincial politics in 1896 to join the federal cabinet of Prime Minister Sir Wilfrid Laurier. Murray was sworn in as premier and took a seat in the Nova Scotia House of Assembly when he was acclaimed as a candidate in Victoria County.

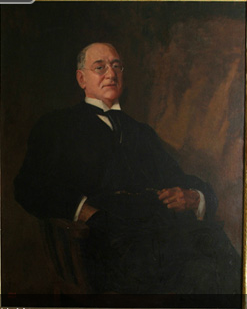
George Henry Murray by Edmund Wyly Grier, Province House (Nova Scotia)

== Premier of Nova Scotia ==
As premier, Murray was a practitioner of brokerage politics. His government continued the public works projects of his predecessor, particularly in the area of railways by doubling the province's track mileage within a decade, as well as road and bridge construction. His government was instrumental in improving the province's postsecondary education system, particularly in agricultural and vocational education by the founding of the Nova Scotia Agricultural College at Bible Hill as well as the Nova Scotia Technical College in Halifax.

In 1906, the Liberals instituted prohibition. The Murray government also introduced workers' compensation in 1916 and instituted women's suffrage in 1918.

The Murray government also introduced progressive labour legislation such as the Factories Act in 1908 and the act for workman's compensation for injuries on the job in 1915. In the area of public health, that appointed public health officers, established county health clinics, and founded a research hospital for tuberculosis patients.

After almost three decades in power, Murray retired from politics in January 1923. He twice declined the offer of knighthood and twice refused earlier offers to join the federal cabinet of Prime Minister Wilfrid Laurier. He died in Montreal.

Murray's son George Belcher Murray later served in the provincial assembly.

== See also ==
- Edith Archibald
