= Jordan W. Smith =

Canadian physician and politician

Jordan Wesley Smith (May 24, 1864 – May 6, 1948) was a physician and political figure in Nova Scotia, Canada. He represented Queen's County in the Nova Scotia House of Assembly from 1911 to 1920 as a Liberal member.

He was born in Selma, Hants County, Nova Scotia, the son of Richard Morris Smith and Sarah Ann Gaetz. After studying at the normal school in Truro, Smith taught school for five years. He then studied at the College of Physicians and Surgeons in Baltimore, Maryland as well as Johns Hopkins University. He practiced at the Hebrew Hospital in Baltimore for a year before returning to Nova Scotia, setting up practice at Liverpool in 1895. In 1902, Smith married Alma E. Hunt. He was a member of the Freemasons and also of the Independent Order of Oddfellows and Independent Order of Foresters. He died in Liverpool.
