= Josiah Frederick Fraser =

Canadian politician

Josiah Frederick Fraser (August 11, 1870 – November 4, 1942) was a businessman and political figure in Nova Scotia, Canada. He represented Halifax County in the Nova Scotia House of Assembly from 1925 to 1933 as a Liberal-Conservative member.

He was born in North Lake, Prince Edward Island, the son of Robert Fraser and Elizabeth Stewart. Fraser was educated at a business college in Charlottetown. In 1899, he married Carrie Merrill Stills. He was co-owner of a meat packing company. Fraser also served as a director of the Bank of Nova Scotia and the Mutual Life Insurance Company of Canada. He served in the province's Executive Council as a minister without portfolio from 1925 to 1931 and as Provincial Secretary from 1931 to 1933. He died in Halifax at the age of 72.
