= Daniel George McKenzie =

Canadian politician (1860–1940)

MLA for Cumberland County
- In office 1920–1933

Speaker of the Nova Scotia House of Assembly
- In office 1929–1933
- Preceded by: Albert Parsons
- Succeeded by: Lindsay C. Gardner

Personal details
- Born: June 24, 1860 Yarmouth, Nova Scotia
- Died: February 4, 1940 (aged 79) Malagash, Nova Scotia
- Party: United Farmers and Liberal-Conservative
- Occupation: farmer

Daniel George McKenzie (June 24, 1860 – February 4, 1940) was a farmer and political figure in Nova Scotia, Canada. He represented Cumberland County in the Nova Scotia House of Assembly from 1920 to 1933 as a United Farmers and then Liberal-Conservative member.

He was born in Malagash, Nova Scotia, the son of Donald McKenzie. McKenzie was married twice: to Mary McKenzie in 1884 and then to Julia Cameron. McKenzie served as Speaker of the House of Assembly of Nova Scotia from 1929 to 1933. He was party leader for the United Farmers of Nova Scotia and leader of the opposition in 1920. McKenzie died in Malagash at the age of 79.
