= Henry Bauld =

Canadian politician

Henry Gibson Bauld (July 26, 1859 – February 3, 1948) was a merchant and political figure in Nova Scotia, Canada. He represented Halifax County in the Nova Scotia House of Assembly from 1916 to 1925 as a Liberal member.

He was born in Halifax, the son of William Bauld and Emily Grey. In 1882, he married Margaret Edith Duncan. Bauld was a director of Halifax Fire Insurance Company and the Merchants' Bank of Halifax (now Royal Bank of Canada). He was also president of the Nova Scotia Home for Colored Children in Preston. Bauld died in Halifax on February 3, 1948 at the age of 88.
