= James William Reid =

Canadian politician

James William Reid (May 30, 1859 – October 30, 1933) was a physician and political figure in Nova Scotia, Canada. He represented Hants County in the Nova Scotia House of Assembly from 1911 to 1925 as a Liberal member.

He was born in Musquodoboit, Nova Scotia, the son of Robert Reid and Mary A. Archibald, of United Empire Loyalist descent. He was educated at Dalhousie University and set up practice in Hants County. In 1891, Reid married Mary Falconer. He served on the town council. Reid was also president of the Colchester-Hants Counties Medical Society and of the Hants County Temperance Alliance. He died at Windsor in 1933.
