= Archibald Terris =

Canadian politician

Archibald Terris (November 30, 1873 – February 14, 1938) was a coal miner and political figure in Nova Scotia. He represented Cumberland County in the Nova Scotia House of Assembly from 1920 to 1925 and 1928 to 1933 as an Independent Labour member. Terris was a Labour-Conservative member from 1925 to 1928.

He was born in Hillsboro, Albert County, New Brunswick, the son of Asa Terris and Mary Giles, and was educated in Springhill, Nova Scotia. In 1895, he married Annie McDonald. Terris served as treasurer for a United Mine Workers local from 1922 to 1929. He died in Springhill at the age of 64.
