= John L. Connolly =

Canadian politician

John Lane Connolly (August 10, 1871 – December 9, 1933) was a merchant and political figure in Nova Scotia, Canada. He represented Halifax County in the Nova Scotia House of Assembly from 1916 to 1925 as a Liberal.

He was the son of Thomas G. Connolly and Mary E. Lane. Connolly sold stationery supplies. He lived in Halifax. Connolly died there at the age of 62 and was buried in Holy Cross Cemetery.
