= Benjamin Amedeé LeBlanc =

Canadian politician

Benjamin Amedeé LeBlanc (February 4, 1879 – June 29, 1946) was a physician and political figure in Nova Scotia, Canada. He represented Richmond County from 1916 to 1925 and Richmond County & Cape Breton West from 1925 to 1928 as a Liberal-Conservative member.

He was born in Arichat, Nova Scotia, the son of Benjamin LeBlanc and Virginia Landry. LeBlanc was educated at St. Francis Xavier University and Dalhousie University. In 1922, he married Euphemia Brown MacMillan. LeBlanc served as a captain in the Canadian Army medical corps during World War I. He was a minister without portfolio in the province's Executive Council from 1925 to 1928. LeBlanc was physician for the port of Arichat from 1931 to 1946. He died in Arichat at the age of 67.
