= Richmond (Nova Scotia provincial electoral district) =

Provincial electoral district in Nova Scotia, Canada

Nova Scotia electoral district

Provincial electoral district
- Legislature: Nova Scotia House of Assembly
MLA
Trevor Boudreau
Progressive Conservative
- District created: 1867, 1933
- District abolished: 1925
- Last contested: 2024

Demographics
- Area (km²): 1,308
- Census division: Richmond County
- Census subdivision(s): Chapel Island 5, Richmond, Subd. A, Richmond, Subd. B, Richmond, Subd. C

Richmond is a provincial electoral district in Nova Scotia, Canada, that elects one member of the Nova Scotia House of Assembly.

Replacing the former district of Richmond-Cape Breton West, it was created in 1933 when the counties of Cape Breton and Richmond were divided into three new electoral districts. In 1992, it was renamed Richmond. In 2013, at the recommendation of the Electoral Boundaries Commission, the district was renamed Cape Breton-Richmond, gained the town of Port Hawkesbury from Inverness and expanded northeast to include the area east of East Bay and west of the Mira River to Morley Road from Cape Breton West. Following the 2019 electoral boundary review, it lost Port Hawkesbury to Inverness and some territory to Cape Breton East, and reverted to the name Richmond. The riding was reinstated after a court challenge that also re-instated the province's two other protected Acadians ridings of Argyle and Clare, and the Black riding of Preston.

A provincial district of Richmond existed from 1867 to 1925. It elected two members, through Block Voting, in this period.

== Geography ==
The land area of Richmond is 1,308 km^{2} (505 sq mi).

== Members of the Legislative Assembly ==
Prior to dissolution of the Legislative Assembly, the electoral district was represented by the following members of the Legislative Assembly:

Richmond
| Legislature | Years | Member | Party |
|---|---|---|---|
| 40th | 1933–1937 | George R. Deveau | Liberal |
| 41st | 1937–1941 | Donald David Boyd | Liberal |
| 42nd | 1941–1941 | Donald David Boyd | Liberal |
| 42nd | 1941–1945 | Lauchlin Daniel Currie | Liberal |
| 43rd | 1945–1949 | Lauchlin Daniel Currie | Liberal |
| 44th | 1949–1949 | Lauchlin Daniel Currie | Liberal |
| 44th | 1949–1953 | Earl Wallace Urquhart | Liberal |
| 45th | 1953–1956 | Earl Wallace Urquhart | Liberal |
| 46th | 1956–1960 | Earl Wallace Urquhart | Liberal |
| 47th | 1960–1963 | Earl Wallace Urquhart | Liberal |
| 48th | 1963–1967 | Gerald Doucet | Progressive Conservative |
| 49th | 1967–1970 | Gerald Doucet | Progressive Conservative |
| 50th | 1970–1974 | Gerald Doucet | Progressive Conservative |
| 51st | 1974–1978 | Gaston LeBlanc | Liberal |
| 52nd | 1978–1980 | Gaston LeBlanc | Liberal |
| 52nd | 1980–1981 | John E. LeBrun | Liberal |
| 53rd | 1981–1984 | Greg MacIsaac | Progressive Conservative |
| 54th | 1984–1988 | Greg MacIsaac | Progressive Conservative |
| 55th | 1988–1993 | Richie Mann | Liberal |
| 56th | 1993–1998 | Richie Mann | Liberal |
| 57th | 1998–1999 | Michel Samson | Liberal |
| 58th | 1999–2003 | Michel Samson | Liberal |
| 59th | 2003–2006 | Michel Samson | Liberal |
| 60th | 2006–2009 | Michel Samson | Liberal |
| 61st | 2009–2013 | Michel Samson | Liberal |
District renamed Cape Breton-Richmond
| 62nd | 2013–2017 | Michel Samson | Liberal |
| 63rd | 2017–2019 | Alana Paon | Progressive Conservative |
| 63rd | 2019–2021 | Alana Paon | Independent |
District renamed Richmond
| 64th | 2021–2024 | Trevor Boudreau | Progressive Conservative |
| 65th | 2024–present | Trevor Boudreau | Progressive Conservative |

== Election results ==
=== 2024 ===
2024 Nova Scotia general election
| Party | Candidate | Votes | % | ±% |
|---|---|---|---|---|
| Progressive Conservative | Trevor Boudreau | 3,496 | 70.84 | +19.98 |
| Liberal | Rochelle Heudes | 1,221 | 24.74 | -12.11 |
| New Democratic | Marc Currie | 218 | 4.42 | -0.61 |
| Total | | 4,935 | – | |
| Total rejected ballots | | 36 | | |
| Turnout | | 4,975 | 61.13 | |
| Eligible voters | | 8,138 | | |
| Progressive Conservative hold | | Swing | | |
Source: Elections Nova Scotia

=== 2021 ===
2021 Nova Scotia general election
| Party | Candidate | Votes | % | ±% | Expenditures |
|---|---|---|---|---|---|
| Progressive Conservative | Trevor Boudreau | 2,773 | 50.86 | +7.47* | $29,831.36 |
| Liberal | Matt Haley | 2,009 | 36.85 | -7.97 | $33,861.12 |
| Independent | Alana Paon | 396 | 7.26 | -36.13* | $8,167.83 |
| New Democratic | Bryson Syliboy | 274 | 5.03 | -6.76 | $13,450.85 |
| Total valid votes/expense limit | | 5,452 | 99.42 | – | $48,330.84 |
| Total rejected ballots | | 32 | 0.58 | | |
| Turnout | | 5,484 | 71.61 | | |
| Eligible voters | | 7,658 | | | |
| Progressive Conservative notional gain from Liberal | | Swing | | +7.72 | |
Source: Elections Nova Scotia

* vote share change compared to the 2017 result for the Progressive Conservative candidate.

=== 2017 ===
2017 provincial election redistributed results
| Party | Vote | % |
|---|---|---|
| Liberal | 2,547 | 44.82 |
| Progressive Conservative | 2,466 | 43.39 |
| New Democratic | 670 | 11.79 |

2017 Nova Scotia general election: Cape Breton-Richmond
| Party | Candidate | Votes | % | ±% |
|---|---|---|---|---|
| Progressive Conservative | Alana Paon | 3,337 | 43.57 | +21.64 |
| Liberal | Michel Samson | 3,316 | 43.30 | -13.21 |
| New Democratic | Larry Keating | 1,006 | 13.13 | -8.43 |
| Total valid votes | | 7,659 | 100 | |
| Total rejected ballots | | 42 | 0.54 | |
| Turnout | | 7,701 | 69.92 | |
| Eligible voters | | 11,014 | | |
| Progressive Conservative gain from Liberal | | Swing | | +17.43 |
Source: Elections Nova Scotia

=== 2013 ===
2013 Nova Scotia general election: Cape Breton-Richmond
| Party | Candidate | Votes | % | ±% |
|---|---|---|---|---|
| Liberal | Michel Samson | 4,369 | 56.51% | 1.15% |
| Progressive Conservative | Joe Janega | 1,696 | 21.93% | 4.01% |
| New Democratic | Bert Lewis | 1,667 | 21.56% | -3.77% |
| Total | | 7,732 | – | |
Source(s) Source: Nova Scotia Legislature (2024). "Electoral History for Cape Breton-Richmond" (PDF). nslegislature.ca. Nova Scotia, Chief Electoral Officer (2013). 39th Provincial General Election, October 8, 2013: Volume 1 – Statement of Votes & Statistics (PDF) (Report). Elections Nova Scotia. Archived from the original (PDF) on 10 April 2018.

=== 2009 ===
2009 Nova Scotia general election
| Party | Candidate | Votes | % | ±% |
|---|---|---|---|---|
| Liberal | Michel Samson | 3,228 | 55.36% | 6.81% |
| New Democratic | Clair Rankin | 1,477 | 25.33% | 15.90% |
| Progressive Conservative | John Greene | 1,045 | 17.92% | -22.53% |
| Green | John H. Percy | 81 | 1.39% | -0.18% |
| Total | | 5,831 | – | |
Source(s) Source: Nova Scotia Legislature (2024). "Electoral History for Richmond" (PDF). nslegislature.ca.

=== 2006 ===
2006 Nova Scotia general election
| Party | Candidate | Votes | % | ±% |
|---|---|---|---|---|
| Liberal | Michel Samson | 2,722 | 48.55% | -2.81% |
| Progressive Conservative | John Greene | 2,268 | 40.45% | 9.27% |
| New Democratic | Mary Cude | 529 | 9.43% | -8.03% |
| Green | Noreen Hartlen | 88 | 1.57% | – |
| Total | | 5,607 | – | |
Source(s) Source: Nova Scotia Legislature (2024). "Electoral History for Richmond" (PDF). nslegislature.ca.

=== 2003 ===
2003 Nova Scotia general election
| Party | Candidate | Votes | % | ±% |
|---|---|---|---|---|
| Liberal | Michel Samson | 3,047 | 51.36% | 4.35% |
| Progressive Conservative | Richie Cotton | 1,850 | 31.18% | 2.34% |
| New Democratic | Clair Rankin | 1,036 | 17.46% | -6.69% |
| Total | | 5,933 | – | |
Source(s) Source: Nova Scotia Legislature (2024). "Electoral History for Richmond" (PDF). nslegislature.ca.

=== 1999 ===
1999 Nova Scotia general election
| Party | Candidate | Votes | % | ±% |
|---|---|---|---|---|
| Liberal | Michel Samson | 3,105 | 47.01% | -1.39% |
| Progressive Conservative | Joseph MacPhee | 1,905 | 28.84% | 7.98% |
| New Democratic | Wilma Conrod | 1,595 | 24.15% | -6.59% |
| Total | | 6,605 | – | |
Source(s) Source: Nova Scotia Legislature (2024). "Electoral History for Richmond" (PDF). nslegislature.ca. Nova Scotia, Chief Electoral Officer (1999). Returns of the General Election for the House of Assembly, Thirty-Fifth General Election (Report). Elections Nova Scotia.

=== 1998 ===
1998 Nova Scotia general election
| Party | Candidate | Votes | % | ±% |
|---|---|---|---|---|
| Liberal | Michel Samson | 3,230 | 48.40% | -25.99% |
| New Democratic | Wilma Conrod | 2,051 | 30.74% | 26.84% |
| Progressive Conservative | Frank Sutherland | 1,392 | 20.86% | -0.84% |
| Total | | 6,673 | – | |
Source(s) Source: Nova Scotia Legislature (2024). "Electoral History for Richmond" (PDF). nslegislature.ca.

=== 1993 ===
1993 Nova Scotia general election
| Party | Candidate | Votes | % | ±% |
|---|---|---|---|---|
| Liberal | Richie Mann | 5,440 | 74.40% | 27.47% |
| Progressive Conservative | Chuck Boudreau | 1,587 | 21.70% | -20.00% |
| New Democratic | Wilf Cude | 285 | 3.90% | -7.48% |
| Total | | 7,312 | – | |
Source(s) Source: Nova Scotia Legislature (2024). "Electoral History for Richmond" (PDF). nslegislature.ca. Nova Scotia, Chief Electoral Officer (1993). Returns of the General Election for the House of Assembly, Thirty-Third General Election (PDF) (Report). Queen's Printer. Archived from the original (PDF) on 18 June 2018.

=== 1988 ===
1988 Nova Scotia general election
| Party | Candidate | Votes | % | ±% |
|---|---|---|---|---|
| Liberal | Richie Mann | 3,528 | 46.93% | 6.56% |
| Progressive Conservative | Robert F. Martel | 3,135 | 41.70% | -5.50% |
| New Democratic | Clair Rankin | 855 | 11.37% | -0.61% |
| Total | | 7,518 | – | |
Source(s) Source: Nova Scotia Legislature (2024). "Electoral History for Richmond" (PDF). nslegislature.ca. Nova Scotia, Chief Electoral Officer (1988). Returns of the General Election for the House of Assembly, Thirty-Second General Election (PDF) (Report). Queen's Printer. Archived from the original (PDF) on 7 July 2018.

=== 1984 ===
1984 Nova Scotia general election
| Party | Candidate | Votes | % | ±% |
|---|---|---|---|---|
| Progressive Conservative | Greg MacIsaac | 3,262 | 47.20% | 1.17% |
| Liberal | Richie Mann | 2,790 | 40.37% | -0.56% |
| New Democratic | Shirley McNamara | 828 | 11.98% | -1.06% |
| Labour | Ken Covey | 31 | 0.45% | – |
| Total | | 6,911 | – | |
Source(s) Source: Nova Scotia Legislature (2024). "Electoral History for Richmond" (PDF). nslegislature.ca. Nova Scotia, Chief Electoral Officer (1984). Returns of the General Election for the House of Assembly, Thirty-First General Election (PDF) (Report). Queen's Printer. Archived from the original (PDF) on 31 July 2017.

=== 1981 ===
1981 Nova Scotia general election
| Party | Candidate | Votes | % | ±% |
|---|---|---|---|---|
| Progressive Conservative | Greg MacIsaac | 3,173 | 46.03% | -1.30% |
| Liberal | John E. LeBrun | 2,821 | 40.93% | -7.34% |
| New Democratic | Shirley McNamara | 899 | 13.04% | 8.64% |
| Total | | 6,893 | – | |
Source(s) Source: Nova Scotia Legislature (2024). "Electoral History for Richmond" (PDF). nslegislature.ca. Nova Scotia, Chief Electoral Officer (1981). Returns of the General Election for the House of Assembly, Thirtieth General Election (PDF) (Report). Queen's Printer. Archived from the original (PDF) on 31 July 2017.

=== 1980 ===
Nova Scotia provincial by-election, 1980-05-06
| Party | Candidate | Votes | % | ±% |
|---|---|---|---|---|
| Liberal | John E. LeBrun | 3,124 | 48.26% | -1.13% |
| Progressive Conservative | Eva Landry | 3,064 | 47.34% | 10.58% |
| New Democratic | Henry Martell | 285 | 4.40% | -9.45% |
| Total | | 6,473 | – | |
Source(s) Source: Nova Scotia Legislature (2024). "Electoral History for Richmond" (PDF). nslegislature.ca.

=== 1978 ===
1978 Nova Scotia general election
| Party | Candidate | Votes | % | ±% |
|---|---|---|---|---|
| Liberal | Gaston LeBlanc | 3,287 | 49.39% | -8.23% |
| Progressive Conservative | Eva Landry | 2,446 | 36.75% | 3.43% |
| New Democratic | Bruce Wright | 922 | 13.85% | 4.80% |
| Total | | 6,655 | – | |
Source(s) Source: Nova Scotia Legislature (2024). "Electoral History for Richmond" (PDF). nslegislature.ca. Nova Scotia, Chief Electoral Officer (1978). Returns of the General Election for the House of Assembly, Twenty-Ninth General Election (PDF) (Report). Queen's Printer. Archived from the original (PDF) on 18 June 2018.

=== 1974 ===
1974 Nova Scotia general election
| Party | Candidate | Votes | % | ±% |
|---|---|---|---|---|
| Liberal | Gaston LeBlanc | 3,697 | 57.62% | 18.59% |
| Progressive Conservative | Joseph Stewart | 2,138 | 33.32% | -22.35% |
| New Democratic | Stanley Pashkoski | 581 | 9.06% | 3.76% |
| Total | | 6,416 | – | |
Source(s) Source: Nova Scotia Legislature (2024). "Electoral History for Richmond" (PDF). nslegislature.ca. Nova Scotia, Chief Electoral Officer (1974). Returns of the General Election for the House of Assembly, Twenty-Eighth General Election (PDF) (Report). Queen's Printer. Archived from the original (PDF) on 18 June 2018.

=== 1970 ===
1970 Nova Scotia general election
| Party | Candidate | Votes | % | ±% |
|---|---|---|---|---|
| Progressive Conservative | Gerald Doucet | 3,439 | 55.67% | -3.74% |
| Liberal | Melvin J. Burt | 2,411 | 39.03% | -1.55% |
| New Democratic | Charles J. Gallant | 327 | 5.29% | – |
| Total | | 6,177 | – | |
Source(s) Source: Nova Scotia Legislature (2024). "Electoral History for Richmond" (PDF). nslegislature.ca. Nova Scotia, Legislative Assembly (1970). Returns of the General Election for the House of Assembly, 1970 (PDF) (Report). Queen's Printer. Archived from the original (PDF) on 25 July 2018.

=== 1967 ===
1967 Nova Scotia general election
| Party | Candidate | Votes | % | ±% |
|---|---|---|---|---|
| Progressive Conservative | Gerald Doucet | 3,054 | 59.42% | 8.63% |
| Liberal | Rudolph J. Boudreau | 2,086 | 40.58% | -8.63% |
| Total | | 5,140 | – | |
Source(s) Source: Nova Scotia Legislature (2024). "Electoral History for Richmond" (PDF). nslegislature.ca. Nova Scotia Legislature (1967). Returns of the General Election for the House of Assembly (PDF) (Report). Queen's Printer. Archived from the original (PDF) on 25 July 2018.

=== 1963 ===
1963 Nova Scotia general election
| Party | Candidate | Votes | % | ±% |
|---|---|---|---|---|
| Progressive Conservative | Gerald Doucet | 2,670 | 50.79% | 1.90% |
| Liberal | Earl Wallace Urquhart | 2,587 | 49.21% | -1.90% |
| Total | | 5,257 | – | |
Source(s) Source: Nova Scotia Legislature (2024). "Electoral History for Richmond" (PDF). nslegislature.ca. Nova Scotia Legislature (1963). Returns of the General Election for the House of Assembly (PDF) (Report). Queen's Printer. Archived from the original (PDF) on 25 July 2018.

=== 1960 ===
1960 Nova Scotia general election
| Party | Candidate | Votes | % | ±% |
|---|---|---|---|---|
| Liberal | Earl Wallace Urquhart | 2,604 | 51.11% | -2.71% |
| Progressive Conservative | Byron Seymour Langley | 2,491 | 48.89% | 2.71% |
| Total | | 5,095 | – | |
Source(s) Source: Nova Scotia Legislature (2024). "Electoral History for Richmond" (PDF). nslegislature.ca. Nova Scotia Legislature (1960). Returns of the General Election for the House of Assembly (PDF) (Report). Queen's Printer. Archived from the original (PDF) on 25 July 2018.

=== 1956 ===
1956 Nova Scotia general election
| Party | Candidate | Votes | % | ±% |
|---|---|---|---|---|
| Liberal | Earl Wallace Urquhart | 2,636 | 53.82% | -4.49% |
| Progressive Conservative | William C. Boudreau | 2,262 | 46.18% | 4.49% |
| Total | | 4,898 | – | |
Source(s) Source: Nova Scotia Legislature (2024). "Electoral History for Richmond" (PDF). nslegislature.ca. Nova Scotia Legislature (1956). Returns of the General Election for the House of Assembly (PDF) (Report). Queen's Printer. Archived from the original (PDF) on 10 September 2018.

=== 1953 ===
1953 Nova Scotia general election
| Party | Candidate | Votes | % | ±% |
|---|---|---|---|---|
| Liberal | Earl Wallace Urquhart | 2,970 | 58.30% | -1.63% |
| Progressive Conservative | Francis Whyte | 2,124 | 41.70% | 1.63% |
| Total | | 5,094 | – | |
Source(s) Source: Nova Scotia Legislature (2024). "Electoral History for Richmond" (PDF). nslegislature.ca. Nova Scotia Legislature (1953). Returns of the General Election for the House of Assembly (PDF) (Report). Queen's Printer. Archived from the original (PDF) on 10 September 2018.

=== 1949 ===
Nova Scotia provincial by-election, 1949-12-20
| Party | Candidate | Votes | % | ±% |
|---|---|---|---|---|
| Liberal | Earl Wallace Urquhart | 2,708 | 59.94% | -6.55% |
| Progressive Conservative | A. A. Baccardax | 1,810 | 40.06% | 6.55% |
| Total | | 4,518 | – | |
Source(s) Source: Nova Scotia Legislature (2024). "Electoral History for Richmond" (PDF). nslegislature.ca. Nova Scotia Legislature (1949). Returns of the General Election for the House of Assembly (PDF) (Report). Queen's Printer. Archived from the original (PDF) on 10 September 2018.

=== 1949 ===
1949 Nova Scotia general election
| Party | Candidate | Votes | % | ±% |
|---|---|---|---|---|
| Liberal | Lauchlin Daniel Currie | 3,254 | 66.49% | -10.17% |
| Progressive Conservative | Donald W. Morrison | 1,640 | 33.51% | 10.17% |
| Total | | 4,894 | – | |
Source(s) Source: Nova Scotia Legislature (2024). "Electoral History for Richmond" (PDF). nslegislature.ca. Nova Scotia Legislature (1949). Returns of the General Election for the House of Assembly (PDF) (Report). Queen's Printer. Archived from the original (PDF) on 10 September 2018.

=== 1945 ===
1945 Nova Scotia general election
| Party | Candidate | Votes | % | ±% |
|---|---|---|---|---|
| Liberal | Lauchlin Daniel Currie | 3,149 | 76.66% | – |
| Progressive Conservative | Frederick Albert Thurgood | 959 | 23.34% | – |
| Total | | 4,108 | – | |
Source(s) Source: Nova Scotia Legislature (2024). "Electoral History for Richmond" (PDF). nslegislature.ca. Nova Scotia Legislature (1945). Returns of the General Election for the House of Assembly (PDF) (Report). Queen's Printer. Archived from the original (PDF) on 10 September 2018.

=== 1941 by-election ===
Nova Scotia provincial by-election, 1941-12-15
| Party | Candidate | Votes | % | ±% |
|---|---|---|---|---|
| Liberal | Lauchlin Daniel Currie | acclaimed | N/A | – |
| Total | | | – | |
Source(s) Source: Nova Scotia Legislature (2024). "Electoral History for Richmond" (PDF). nslegislature.ca. Nova Scotia Legislature (1941). Returns of the General Election for the House of Assembly (PDF) (Report). Queen's Printer. Archived from the original (PDF) on 8 February 2024.

=== 1941 ===
1941 Nova Scotia general election
| Party | Candidate | Votes | % | ±% |
|---|---|---|---|---|
| Liberal | Donald David Boyd | 2,176 | 50.59% | -2.79% |
| Progressive Conservative | Benjamin Amedeé LeBlanc | 2,125 | 49.41% | 2.79% |
| Total | | 4,301 | – | |
Source(s) Source: Nova Scotia Legislature (2024). "Electoral History for Richmond" (PDF). nslegislature.ca. Nova Scotia Legislature (1941). Returns of the General Election for the House of Assembly (PDF) (Report). Queen's Printer. Archived from the original (PDF) on 8 February 2024.

=== 1937 ===
1937 Nova Scotia general election
| Party | Candidate | Votes | % | ±% |
|---|---|---|---|---|
| Liberal | Donald David Boyd | 2,888 | 53.38% | -0.16% |
| Progressive Conservative | Benjamin Amedeé LeBlanc | 2,522 | 46.62% | – |
| Total | | 5,410 | – | |
Source(s) Source: Nova Scotia Legislature (2024). "Electoral History for Richmond" (PDF). nslegislature.ca. Nova Scotia Legislature (1937). Returns of the General Election for the House of Assembly (PDF) (Report). Queen's Printer. Archived from the original (PDF) on 1 March 2019.

=== 1933 ===
1933 Nova Scotia general election
| Party | Candidate | Votes | % | ±% |
|---|---|---|---|---|
| Liberal | George R. Deveau | 3,000 | 53.54% | – |
| Liberal-Conservative | Benjamin Amedeé LeBlanc | 2,603 | 46.46% | – |
| Total | | 5,603 | – | |
Source(s) Source: Nova Scotia Legislature (2024). "Electoral History for Richmond" (PDF). nslegislature.ca. Nova Scotia Legislature (1933). Returns of the General Election for the House of Assembly (PDF) (Report). Queen's Printer. Archived from the original (PDF) on 1 March 2019.

=== 1920 ===
1920 Nova Scotia general election: Richmond County
| Party | Candidate | Votes | % | Elected |
|---|---|---|---|---|
| Liberal-Conservative | John Alexander Macdonald | 1,921 | 26.56% | ✓ |
| Liberal-Conservative | Benjamin Amedeé LeBlanc | 1,823 | 25.20% | ✓ |
| Liberal | G. H. Murray | 1,761 | 24.35% | |
| Liberal | George R. Deveau | 1,728 | 23.89% | |
| Total | | 7,233 | – | |
Source(s) Source: Nova Scotia Legislature (2024). "Electoral History for Richmond" (PDF). nslegislature.ca.

=== 1916 ===
1916 Nova Scotia general election: Richmond County
| Party | Candidate | Votes | % | Elected |
|---|---|---|---|---|
| Liberal-Conservative | Benjamin Amedeé LeBlanc | 1,388 | 29.63% | ✓ |
| Liberal-Conservative | John Alexander Macdonald | 1,384 | 29.55% | ✓ |
| Liberal | Alexander Finlayson | 994 | 21.22% | |
| Liberal | Simon Joyce | 918 | 19.60% | |
| Total | | 4,684 | – | |
Source(s) Source: Nova Scotia Legislature (2024). "Electoral History for Richmond" (PDF). nslegislature.ca.

=== 1911 ===
1911 Nova Scotia general election: Richmond County
| Party | Candidate | Votes | % | Elected |
|---|---|---|---|---|
| Liberal | Simon Joyce | 1,108 | 28.94% | ✓ |
| Liberal | Charles P. Bissett | 1,097 | 28.66% | ✓ |
| Liberal-Conservative | Felix Landry | 821 | 21.45% | |
| Liberal-Conservative | James McVicar | 802 | 20.95% | |
| Total | | 3,828 | – | |
Source(s) Source: Nova Scotia Legislature (2024). "Electoral History for Richmond" (PDF). nslegislature.ca.

=== 1906 ===
1906 Nova Scotia general election: Richmond County
| Party | Candidate | Votes | % | Elected |
|---|---|---|---|---|
| Liberal | Charles P. Bissett | 1,140 | 36.66% | ✓ |
| Liberal-Conservative | Felix Landry | 806 | 25.92% | ✓ |
| Liberal | Simon Joyce | 766 | 24.63% | |
| Liberal-Conservative | Edward Doyle | 398 | 12.80% | |
| Total | | 3,110 | – | |
Source(s) Source: Nova Scotia Legislature (2024). "Electoral History for Richmond" (PDF). nslegislature.ca.

=== 1904 ===
Nova Scotia provincial by-election, 1904-12-15: Richmond County
| Party | Candidate | Votes | % | Elected |
|---|---|---|---|---|
| Liberal | Charles P. Bissett | 1,077 | 55.86% | ✓ |
| Liberal-Conservative | A. J. Boyd | 851 | 44.14% | |
| Total | | 1,928 | – | |
Source(s) Source: Nova Scotia Legislature (2024). "Electoral History for Richmond" (PDF). nslegislature.ca.

=== 1901 ===
1901 Nova Scotia general election: Richmond County
| Party | Candidate | Votes | % | Elected |
|---|---|---|---|---|
| Liberal | Duncan Finlayson | 1,090 | 34.64% | ✓ |
| Liberal | Simon Joyce | 994 | 31.59% | ✓ |
| Liberal-Conservative | D. G. Stewart | 562 | 17.86% | |
| Liberal-Conservative | Felix Landry | 501 | 15.92% | |
| Total | | 3,147 | – | |
Source(s) Source: Nova Scotia Legislature (2024). "Electoral History for Richmond" (PDF). nslegislature.ca.

=== 1897 ===
1897 Nova Scotia general election: Richmond County
| Party | Candidate | Votes | % | Elected |
|---|---|---|---|---|
| Liberal | Duncan Finlayson | 1,034 | 27.92% | ✓ |
| Liberal | Simon Joyce | 958 | 25.86% | ✓ |
| Liberal-Conservative | John Morrison | 910 | 24.57% | |
| Liberal-Conservative | Remi Benoit | 802 | 21.65% | |
| Total | | 3,704 | – | |
Source(s) Source: Nova Scotia Legislature (2024). "Electoral History for Richmond" (PDF). nslegislature.ca.

=== 1894 ===
Nova Scotia provincial by-election, 1894-12-27: Richmond County
| Party | Candidate | Votes | % | Elected |
|---|---|---|---|---|
| Liberal | Joseph Matheson | 1,055 | 52.70% | ✓ |
| Liberal-Conservative | John Morrison | 947 | 47.30% | |
| Total | | 2,002 | – | |
Source(s) Source: Nova Scotia Legislature (2024). "Electoral History for Richmond" (PDF). nslegislature.ca.

=== 1894 ===
1894 Nova Scotia general election: Richmond County
| Party | Candidate | Votes | % | Elected |
|---|---|---|---|---|
| Liberal | Simon Joyce | 996 | 25.89% | ✓ |
| Liberal-Conservative | John Morrison | 994 | 25.84% | ✓ |
| Liberal | Joseph Matheson | 974 | 25.32% | |
| Liberal-Conservative | Abraham LeBlanc | 883 | 22.95% | |
| Total | | 3,847 | – | |
Source(s) Source: Nova Scotia Legislature (2024). "Electoral History for Richmond" (PDF). nslegislature.ca.

=== 1890 ===
1890 Nova Scotia general election: Richmond County
| Party | Candidate | Votes | % | Elected |
|---|---|---|---|---|
| Liberal | Abraham LeBlanc | 865 | 28.47% | ✓ |
| Liberal | Joseph Matheson | 859 | 28.28% | ✓ |
| Liberal-Conservative | David A. Hearn | 669 | 22.02% | |
| Liberal-Conservative | Roderick Ferguson | 645 | 21.23% | |
| Total | | 3,038 | – | |
Source(s) Source: Nova Scotia Legislature (2024). "Electoral History for Richmond" (PDF). nslegislature.ca.

=== 1886 ===
1886 Nova Scotia general election: Richmond County
| Party | Candidate | Votes | % | Elected |
|---|---|---|---|---|
| Liberal | Joseph Matheson | 616 | 26.61% | ✓ |
| Liberal-Conservative | David A. Hearn | 534 | 23.07% | ✓ |
| Liberal | Angus S. McLean | 455 | 19.65% | |
| Liberal | Charles LeNoir | 394 | 17.02% | |
| Liberal-Conservative | Murdoch McRae | 316 | 13.65% | |
| Total | | 2,315 | – | |
Source(s) Source: Nova Scotia Legislature (2024). "Electoral History for Richmond" (PDF). nslegislature.ca.

=== 1882 ===
1882 Nova Scotia general election: Richmond County
| Party | Candidate | Votes | % | Elected |
|---|---|---|---|---|
| Liberal | Isidore LeBlanc | 538 | 30.31% | ✓ |
| Liberal-Conservative | Murdoch McRae | 407 | 22.93% | ✓ |
| Liberal | Joseph Matheson | 354 | 19.94% | |
| Liberal-Conservative | Alexander McCuish | 326 | 18.37% | |
| Liberal-Conservative | Neil McNeil | 150 | 8.45% | |
| Total | | 1,775 | – | |
Source(s) Source: Nova Scotia Legislature (2024). "Electoral History for Richmond" (PDF). nslegislature.ca.

=== 1878 ===
1878 Nova Scotia general election: Richmond County
| Party | Candidate | Votes | % | Elected |
|---|---|---|---|---|
| Liberal-Conservative | Alexander McCuish | 643 | 28.03% | ✓ |
| Liberal | Isidore LeBlanc | 599 | 26.11% | ✓ |
| Liberal-Conservative | Ed Gagnon | 551 | 24.02% | |
| Liberal | Joseph Matheson | 501 | 21.84% | |
| Total | | 2,294 | – | |
Source(s) Source: Nova Scotia Legislature (2024). "Electoral History for Richmond" (PDF). nslegislature.ca.

=== 1874 ===
1874 Nova Scotia general election: Richmond County
| Party | Candidate | Votes | % | Elected |
|---|---|---|---|---|
| Independent | Charles Boudroit | acclaimed | N/A | ✓ |
| Liberal-Conservative | Murdoch McRae | acclaimed | N/A | ✓ |
| Total | | | – | |
Source(s) Source: Nova Scotia Legislature (2024). "Electoral History for Richmond" (PDF). nslegislature.ca.

=== 1874 ===
Nova Scotia provincial by-election, 1874-03-04: Richmond County
| Party | Candidate | Votes | % | Elected |
|---|---|---|---|---|
| Independent | Charles Boudroit | 416 | 78.79% | ✓ |
| Independent | John Freehill | 112 | 21.21% | |
| Total | | 528 | – | |
Source(s) Source: Nova Scotia Legislature (2024). "Electoral History for Richmond" (PDF). nslegislature.ca.

=== 1871 ===
1871 Nova Scotia general election: Richmond County
| Party | Candidate | Votes | % | Elected |
|---|---|---|---|---|
| Liberal | Edmund Power Flynn | 492 | 39.17% | ✓ |
| Liberal-Conservative | Murdoch McRae | 447 | 35.59% | ✓ |
| Liberal | Isidore LeBlanc | 317 | 25.24% | |
| Total | | 1,256 | – | |
Source(s) Source: Nova Scotia Legislature (2024). "Electoral History for Richmond" (PDF). nslegislature.ca.

=== 1867 ===
1867 Nova Scotia general election: Richmond County
| Party | Candidate | Votes | % | Elected |
|---|---|---|---|---|
| Anti-Confederation | Edmund Power Flynn | 583 | 39.85% | ✓ |
| Anti-Confederation | Josiah Hooper | 518 | 35.41% | ✓ |
| Confederation | J. H. Hearn | 362 | 24.74% | |
| Total | | 1,463 | – | |
Source(s) Source: Nova Scotia Legislature (2024). "Electoral History for Richmond" (PDF). nslegislature.ca.

== See also ==
- List of Nova Scotia provincial electoral districts
- Canadian provincial electoral districts
