= Richmond and Cape Breton West =

Former provincial electoral district in Nova Scotia, Canada

Nova Scotia electoral district

Defunct provincial electoral district
- Legislature: Nova Scotia House of Assembly
- District created: 1925
- District abolished: 1933
- Last contested: 1928

Richmond-Cape Breton West was a provincial electoral district in Nova Scotia, Canada, that elected two members to the Nova Scotia House of Assembly. It existed from 1925 to 1933, at which point the district was divided into two distinct electoral districts: Richmond and Cape Breton West.

It elected two members through Plurality block voting.

== Members of the Legislative Assembly ==
Legislature	Years	Member	Party	Member	Party
39th	1930–1933	Alonzo Martell	Liberal	seat declared vacant
39th	1928–1930	Alonzo Martell	Liberal	Edward C. Doyle	Liberal
38th	1926–1928	Benjamin Amedeé LeBlanc	Liberal-Conservative	John Angus Stewart	Liberal-Conservative
38th	1925–1926	Benjamin Amedeé LeBlanc	Liberal-Conservative	John Alexander Macdonald	Liberal-Conservative

== Election results ==
1928 Nova Scotia general election
Party	Candidate	Votes	%	Elected
Liberal	Alonzo Martell	3,262	26.40%	✓
Liberal	Edward C. Doyle	3,150	25.49%	✓
Liberal–Conservative	Benjamin Amedeé LeBlanc	2,993	24.22%	
Liberal–Conservative	John Angus Stewart	2,951	23.88%	
Total		12,356	–	
Source(s) Source: Nova Scotia Legislature (2024). "Electoral History for Richmond-West Cape Breton" (PDF). nslegislature.ca.

Nova Scotia provincial by-election, 1926-02-24
Party	Candidate	Votes	%	Elected
Liberal–Conservative	John Angus Stewart	acclaimed	N/A	✓
Total			–	
Source(s) Source: Nova Scotia Legislature (2024). "Electoral History for Richmond-West Cape Breton" (PDF). nslegislature.ca.

1925 Nova Scotia general election
Party	Candidate	Votes	%	Elected
Liberal–Conservative	John Alexander Macdonald	3,503	28.46%	✓
Liberal–Conservative	Benjamin Amedeé LeBlanc	3,500	28.44%	✓
Liberal	Donald David Boyd	2,667	21.67%	
Liberal	George R. Deveau	2,637	21.43%	
Total		12,307	–	
Source(s) Source: Nova Scotia Legislature (2024). "Electoral History for Richmond-West Cape Breton" (PDF). nslegislature.ca.

== See also ==
- List of Nova Scotia provincial electoral districts
- Canadian provincial electoral districts
