= 39th General Assembly of Nova Scotia =

Political Gathering

The 39th General Assembly of Nova Scotia represented Nova Scotia between October 1, 1928, to July 13, 1933.

Gordon Sidney Harrington became premier in 1930 after E. N. Rhodes entered the federal cabinet.

== Division of seats ==
There were 43 members of the General Assembly, elected in the 1928 Nova Scotia general election.

Leader	Party	# of Seats
Edgar Nelson Rhodes	Conservative	24
William Chisholm	Liberal	18
N/A	CCF/United Farmer/Labour	1
Total		43

== List of members ==
Riding	Name	Party	First elected / previously elected	Position
Annapolis County	Obediah Parker Goucher	Conservative	1925	Minister of Agriculture (1930)
Annapolis County	Harry Thompson MacKenzie	Conservative	1925	
Antigonish County	John Laughlin McIsaac	Liberal	1925	
Antigonish County	William Chisholm	Liberal	1916	
Cape Breton Centre	Gordon Sidney Harrington	Conservative	1925	Premier (1930)
Cape Breton Centre	Joseph Macdonald	Conservative	1925	
Cape Breton East	Robert H. Butts	Conservative	1911, 1928	
Cape Breton East	Daniel R. Cameron	Conservative	1928	
Colchester County	Frank Stanfield	Conservative	1911, 1925	
Colchester County	William A. Flemming	Conservative	1928	
Cumberland County	Percy Chapman Black	Conservative	1925	Minister of Highways
Cumberland County	Archibald Terris	Labour	1920	
Cumberland County	Daniel George McKenzie	Conservative	1920	
Digby County	Joseph Willie Comeau	Liberal	1907, 1920, 1928	
Digby County	Alexander S. MacMillan	Liberal	1928	
Guysborough County	Clarence W. Anderson	Liberal	1920, 1928	
Guysborough County	M. E. Morrison	Liberal	1928	
Halifax County	John Francis Mahoney	Conservative	1925	
Halifax County	Gordon Benjamin Isnor	Liberal	1928	
Halifax County	Josiah Frederick Fraser	Conservative	1925	Provincial Secretary (1931)
Halifax County	Angus McDonald Morton	Conservative	1928	
Halifax County	Edward Joseph Cragg	Liberal	1928	
Halifax County	George H. Murphy (1930)	Conservative	1930	
Hants County	Albert E. Parsons	Conservative	1909, 1925	
Hants County	Edgar Nelson Rhodes	Conservative	1925	Premier
Inverness County	James A.Proudfoot	Liberal	1928	
Inverness County	Moses E. McGarry	Liberal	1928	
Kings County	Reginald Tucker Caldwell	Conservative	1925	
Kings County	George Clyde Nowlan	Conservative	1925	
Lunenburg County	John James Kinley	Liberal	1916, 1928	
Lunenburg County	Gordon E. Romkey	Liberal	1928	
Pictou County	John Doull	Conservative	1925	
Pictou County	Robert Albert Douglas	Conservative	1925	
Pictou County	Hugh Allan MacQuarrie	Conservative	1925	
Queens County	William Lorimer Hall	Conservative	1910, 1925	
Queens County	Donald W. MacKay	Conservative	1928	
Richmond County & Cape Breton West	Edward C. Doyle	Liberal	1928	
Richmond County & Cape Breton West	Alonzo A. Martell	Liberal	1928	
Shelburne County	Henry R. L. Bill	Liberal	1928	
Shelburne County	Wishart McLea Robertson	Liberal	1928	
Victoria County	Donald Buchanan McLeod	Liberal	1928	
Victoria County	Daniel Alexander Cameron	Liberal	1916, (Note: Cape Breton County) 1923, 1928	
Yarmouth County	Lindsay C. Gardner	Liberal	1928	
Yarmouth County	René W.E. Landry	Liberal	1928	

== Former members of the 39th General Assembly ==
Name	Party	Electoral District	Cause of departure	Succeeded by	Elected
Edward Joseph Cragg	Liberal	Halifax County	resigned to run federally	n/a	
John James Kinley	Liberal	Lunenburg County	resigned to run federally	n/a	
Edward C. Doyle	Liberal	Richmond County & Cape Breton West	resigned to run federally	seat abolished	
Daniel Alexander Cameron	Liberal	Victoria County	resigned to run federally	seat abolished	
John Francis Mahoney	Conservative	Halifax County	death	George H. Murphy, Conservative	January 21, 1930
Edgar Nelson Rhodes	Conservative	Hants County	named to federal cabinet	n/a	
Frank Stanfield	Conservative	Colchester County	appointed Lieutenant Governor	n/a	
William Lorimer Hall	Conservative	Queens County	appointed to Supreme Court of Nova Scotia	seat abolished	

== Notes ==
Preceded by 38th General Assembly of Nova Scotia	General Assemblies of Nova Scotia; 1928–1933	Succeeded by 40th General Assembly of Nova Scotia
