= Edward C. Doyle =

Canadian politician

MLA for Richmond and Cape Breton West
- In office 1928–1930
- Preceded by: Benjamin Amedeé LeBlanc; John Angus Stewart
- Succeeded by: riding dissolved

Personal details
- Born: October 12, 1882 Poulamon, Nova Scotia
- Died: January 2, 1972 (aged 89) Sydney, Nova Scotia
- Party: Nova Scotia Liberal Party
- Occupation: carpenter

Edward Charles Doyle (October 12, 1882 – January 2, 1972) was a Canadian politician. He represented the electoral district of Richmond and Cape Breton West in the Nova Scotia House of Assembly from 1928 to 1930. He was a member of the Nova Scotia Liberal Party.

Born in 1882 at Poulamon, Richmond County, Nova Scotia, Doyle was a carpenter and building contractor by career. He was educated at St. Francis Xavier University, and the Maritime Business College. He married Florence Alice Boutin, and then Evangeline Ganong. Doyle entered provincial politics in 1928, when he was elected in the dual-member Richmond and Cape Breton West riding with Liberal Alonzo Martell. Doyle resigned his seat to run in the 1930 federal election. Running as the Liberal candidate for Richmond—West Cape Breton, Doyle was defeated by Conservative John Alexander Macdonald. From 1935 to 1960, Doyle was the municipal clerk and treasurer for Richmond County. He died at Sydney, Nova Scotia, on January 2, 1972.
