= John Angus Stewart =

Canadian politician from Nova Scotia (1877–unknown)

Member of the Nova Scotia House of Assembly for Richmond and Cape Breton West
- In office February 24, 1926 – September 30, 1928

Personal details
- Born: October 15, 1877 L'Archeveque, Nova Scotia
- Party: Liberal Conservative
- Spouse(s): Elizabeth Morrison; Gladys Smith
- Occupation: merchant, politician

John Angus Stewart (October 15, 1877 – unknown) was a general merchant and political figure in Nova Scotia, Canada. He represented Richmond and Cape Breton West in the Nova Scotia House of Assembly from 1926 to 1928 as a Liberal Conservative member.

Stewart was born in 1877 at L'Archeveque, Nova Scotia to Duncan Young Stewart and Isabel McLeod. He married Elizabeth Morrison, and later married Gladys Smith.

He was acclaimed in a February 24, 1926, by-election after John Alexander Macdonald resigned to contest the 1925 Canadian federal election. Stewart was unsuccessful in the 1928 Nova Scotia general election.
