= Felix Landry =

Canadian politician from Nova Scotia (1864–1923)

Member of the Nova Scotia House of Assembly for Richmond County
- In office June 20, 1906 – June 13, 1911

Personal details
- Born: December 10, 1864 D'Escousse, Nova Scotia
- Died: March 3, 1923 (aged 58) D'Escousse, Nova Scotia
- Party: Liberal Conservative
- Spouse: Julia Poirier
- Occupation: mariner, postmaster, politician

Felix Landry (December 10, 1864 – March 3, 1923) was a mariner and political figure in Nova Scotia, Canada. He represented Richmond County in the Nova Scotia House of Assembly from 1906 to 1911 as a Liberal Conservative member.

Landry was born in 1864 at D'Escousse, Nova Scotia to Felix Landry and Virginia Belfontaine. He married Julia Poirier. He served as a customs officer at D'Escousse from 1912 to 1923 and also held the position of postmaster. Landry died in 1923 at D'Escousse, Nova Scotia.

Landry was initially unsuccessful in the 1901 Nova Scotia general election, and was elected in the 1906 Nova Scotia general election; but was again unsuccessful in the 1911 Nova Scotia general election.
