= George R. Deveau =

Canadian politician

MLA for Richmond
- In office 1933–1937
- Preceded by: new riding
- Succeeded by: Donald David Boyd

Personal details
- Born: October 14, 1891 Mavillette, Nova Scotia, Canada
- Died: November 4, 1983 (aged 92) Halifax, Nova Scotia, Canada
- Party: Nova Scotia Liberal Party
- Occupation: physician

George Raymond Deveau (October 14, 1891 – November 4, 1983) was a Canadian politician. He represented the electoral district of Richmond in the Nova Scotia House of Assembly from 1933 to 1937. He was a member of the Nova Scotia Liberal Party.

== Biography ==
Deveau was born in 1891 at Mavillette, Digby County, Nova Scotia. He was educated at Saint Mary's University and Laval University. He married Marie Marguerite Fortier in 1919. He was employed as a port physician and medical officer at Arichat, Nova Scotia. Deveau made two unsuccessful attempts at entering provincial politics, losing the 1920 election in the Richmond riding, and the 1925 election in the Richmond and Cape Breton West riding. He ran again in the 1933 election, winning the new Richmond riding by 397 votes. Deveau did not reoffer in the 1937 election. Deveau died at Halifax, Nova Scotia on November 4, 1983.
