= Lauchlin Daniel Currie =

Canadian politician

Lauchlin Daniel Currie (March 28, 1893 – February 4, 1969) was a lawyer, judge and political figure in Nova Scotia, Canada. He represented Cape Breton East from 1933 to 1941 and Richmond from 1941 to 1949 in the Nova Scotia House of Assembly as a Liberal member.

He was born in North Sydney, Nova Scotia, the son of Joseph Currie and Elizabeth Morrison. Currie was educated at Ste. Anne's College, St. Francis Xavier University and Dalhousie University. Currie was solicitor for the United Mine Workers in Glace Bay. He married Margaret Curry in 1923. He served in the province's Executive Council as Minister of Mines from 1940 to 1947, Attorney General from 1947 to 1949 and Minister of Public Welfare from 1948 to 1949. In 1949, he was named to the Supreme Court of Nova Scotia. Currie was Chief Justice of Nova Scotia from 1967 until he retired from the bench in March 1968. He died in Halifax at the age of 75.
