= Michel Samson =

Canadian politician (born 1972)

The Honourable Michel Samson ECNS

Member of the Nova Scotia House of Assembly for Cape Breton-Richmond Richmond (1998-2013)
- In office 24 March 1998 – 30 May 2017
- Preceded by: Richie Mann
- Succeeded by: Alana Paon

Minister of Economic and Rural Development and Tourism
- In office 22 October 2013 – 30 May 2017
- Premier: Stephen McNeil
- Preceded by: Graham Steele

Leader of the Nova Scotia Liberal Party interim
- In office 20 June 2006 – 27 April 2007
- Preceded by: Francis MacKenzie
- Succeeded by: Stephen McNeil

Minister of the Environment
- In office 16 December 1998 – 16 August 1999
- Premier: Russell MacLellan
- Preceded by: Don Downe
- Succeeded by: Kerry Morash

Personal details
- Born: 1972 Sydney, Nova Scotia
- Party: Nova Scotia Liberal Party
- Occupation: Lawyer

Michel P. Samson (born 1972) is a Canadian politician, who represented the electoral district of Cape Breton-Richmond, formerly Richmond in the Nova Scotia House of Assembly from 1998 to 2017. He was a member of the Nova Scotia Liberal Party.

Samson attended Isle Madame District High School and graduated with a B.A. from Dalhousie University in 1994 and a LL.B. from Dalhousie Law School in 1997. Samson articled with the Halifax law firm of Blois, Nickerson & Bryson and he was admitted to the Nova Scotia in 1998 before working as an associate at the Port Hawkesbury law firm of Macdonald, Boudrot & Doucet.

== Political career ==
In 1998 Samson successfully ran for the Nova Scotia Liberal Party nomination in the riding of Richmond. He was elected in the 1998 provincial election. In December 1998, Samson was appointed to the Executive Council of Nova Scotia where he served as Minister of the Environment as well as Minister responsible for administration of the Youth Secretariat Act. At the time, he was the youngest person ever to be appointed to the Executive Council of Nova Scotia.

Samson was re-elected in the 1999, 2003, 2006, and 2013 provincial elections.

Samson served as interim leader of the Nova Scotia Liberal Party from 2006-2007 following the resignation of Francis MacKenzie until Stephen McNeil was elected leader; Samson having decided not to pursue the leadership.

On 22 October 2013, Samson was appointed to the Executive Council of Nova Scotia to serve as Minister of Economic and Rural Development and Tourism as well as Minister of Acadian Affairs. In March 2015, Samson was sworn-in as Minister of Energy following the resignation from cabinet of Andrew Younger.

In the 2017 election, Samson was defeated by Progressive Conservative candidate Alana Paon.

=== Electoral record ===
2017 Nova Scotia general election
Party	Candidate	Votes	%	±%
Progressive Conservative	Alana Paon	3,337	43.57	
Liberal	Michel Samson	3,316	43.30	
New Democratic	Larry Keating	1,006	13.13	
Total valid votes		7,659	100.0	
Total rejected ballots		42	0.54	
Turnout		7,701	69.92	
Eligible voters		11,014		

2013 Nova Scotia general election
Party	Candidate	Votes	%	±%
Liberal	Michel Samson	4369	56.51	
Progressive Conservative	Joe Janega	1696	21.93	
New Democratic Party	Bert Lewis	1667	21.56	

2009 Nova Scotia general election
Party	Candidate	Votes	%	±%
Liberal	Michel Samson	3228	55.31	+6.76
New Democratic Party	Clair Rankin	1477	25.31	+15.88
Progressive Conservative	John Greene	1045	17.91	-22.65
Green	John Percy	86	1.47	-0.1

2006 Nova Scotia general election
Party	Candidate	Votes	%	±%
Liberal	Michel Samson	2722	48.55	
Progressive Conservative	John Greene	2268	40.56	
New Democratic Party	Mary Pat Cude	529	9.43	
Green	Noreen Hartlen	88	1.57	–

2003 Nova Scotia general election
Party	Candidate	Votes	%	±%
Liberal	Michel Samson	3047	51.36	
Progressive Conservative	Richie Cotton	1850	31.18	
New Democratic Party	Clair Rankin	1036	17.46	

1999 Nova Scotia general election
Party	Candidate	Votes	%	±%
Liberal	Michel Samson	3105		
Progressive Conservative	Joseph MacPhee	1905		
New Democratic Party	Wilma Conrod	1595		

1998 Nova Scotia general election
Party	Candidate	Votes	%	±%
Liberal	Michel Samson	3,105		
Progressive Conservative	Joseph MacPhee	1,905		
New Democratic Party	Wilma Conrod	1,595		

== See also ==
- 2007 Nova Scotia Liberal Party leadership election
