= Trevor Boudreau =

Canadian politician

The Honourable Trevor Boudreau ECNS MLA

Member of the Nova Scotia House of Assembly for Richmond
- Incumbent
- Assumed office August 17, 2021
- Preceded by: Alana Paon

Personal details
- Born: 1979/1980
- Party: Progressive Conservative
- Occupation: chiropractor

Trevor Boudreau (born 1979 or 1980) is a Canadian politician who was elected to the Nova Scotia House of Assembly in the 2021 Nova Scotia general election. He represents the riding of Richmond as a member of the Progressive Conservative Association of Nova Scotia.

On September 14, 2023, Boudreau was appointed to the Executive Council of Nova Scotia as community services minister and minister responsible for L'nu affairs. He resigned from cabinet on February 22, 2024, for health reasons. Following his re-election in the 2024 election, Boudreau was re-appointed to cabinet as energy minister. Boudreau was moved out of cabinet on October 21, 2025.

Boudreau, a chiropractor, previously served as a municipal councillor and deputy mayor in Port Hawkesbury.

== Electoral record ==
=== 2024 ===
2024 Nova Scotia general election: Richmond
Party	Candidate	Votes	%	±%
Progressive Conservative	Trevor Boudreau	3,496	70.84	+19.98
Liberal	Rochelle Heudes	1,221	24.74	-12.11
New Democratic	Marc Currie	218	4.42	-0.61
Total		4,935	–	
Total rejected ballots		36		
Turnout		4,975	61.13	
Eligible voters		8,138		
Progressive Conservative hold		Swing		
Source: Elections Nova Scotia

=== 2021 ===
2021 Nova Scotia general election: Richmond
Party	Candidate	Votes	%	±%	Expenditures
Progressive Conservative	Trevor Boudreau	2,773	50.86	+7.47*	$29,831.36
Liberal	Matt Haley	2,009	36.85	-7.97	$33,861.12
Independent	Alana Paon	396	7.26	-36.13*	$8,167.83
New Democratic	Bryson Syliboy	274	5.03	-6.76	$13,450.85
Total valid votes/expense limit		5,452	99.42	–	$48,330.84
Total rejected ballots		32	0.58		
Turnout		5,484	71.61		
Eligible voters		7,658			
Progressive Conservative notional gain from Liberal		Swing		+7.72	
Source: Elections Nova Scotia

* vote share change compared to the 2017 result for the Progressive Conservative candidate.
