= Abraham LeBlanc =

Canadian politician (1840–1913)

Abraham LeBlanc (January 17, 1840 – October 24, 1913) was a merchant and political figure in Nova Scotia, Canada. He represented Richmond County in the Nova Scotia House of Assembly from 1890 to 1894 as a Liberal member.

He was born in Port Royal, Nova Scotia. LeBlanc married Zebine Forrest. He died in Arichat, Nova Scotia at the age of 73.
