= Alana Paon =

Canadian politician

Member of the Nova Scotia House of Assembly for Cape Breton-Richmond
- In office May 30, 2017 – July 17, 2021
- Preceded by: Michel Samson
- Succeeded by: Trevor Boudreau

Personal details
- Born: June 26, 1971 (age 55)
- Party: Independent (2019–)
- Other political affiliations: Progressive Conservative (until 2019)

Alana Paon (born June 26, 1971) is a Canadian politician. She was elected to the Nova Scotia House of Assembly in the 2017 provincial election representing the electoral district of Cape Breton-Richmond. She was a member of the Progressive Conservative Association of Nova Scotia until ousted from Caucus on June 24, 2019, amid a long-standing dispute over accessibility to her constituency office in St. Peter's. Paon had threatened to fight a House of Assembly Management Commission order to pave the gravel lot near her office, saying it made her feel "bullied and harassed." Nova Scotia Tory leader Tim Houston called Paon's remarks "unfounded and mean-spirited".

== Early life and education ==
Paon attended North Isle Madame Elementary and Isle Madame District High School. She then attended Dalhousie University studying Arts and Social Science, Adult Education and Architecture. She then graduated from Saint Mary's University with a degree in Community Economic Development. She graduated from Henson College with a certificate in Negotiation and Dispute Resolution.

== Personal life ==
Paon is the mother of Canadian actor and film producer Gharrett Patrick Paon.

== Electoral record ==
2017 Nova Scotia general election
Party	Candidate	Votes	%	±%
Progressive Conservative	Alana Paon	3,337	43.57	
Liberal	Michel Samson	3,316	43.30	
New Democratic	Larry Keating	1,006	13.13	
Total valid votes		7,659	100.0	
Total rejected ballots		42	0.54	
Turnout		7,701	69.92	
Eligible voters		11,014		
