= Rémi Benoît =

- Born: January 3, 1842
- Died: June 19, 1919 (aged 77)
- Occupations: Teacher, office holder, newspaper editor
- Known for: Acadian nationalist; Convention Nationale des Acadiens; Société l'Assomption

Rémi Benoît (January 3, 1842 – June 19, 1919) was a man of a number of vocations from D'Escousse, Nova Scotia.

Benoît, at various times, was a teacher, an office holder, a newspaper editor. He was a French-speaking Acadian who received a great deal of his education in English, resulting in his being fluently bi-lingual. He is important to Canadian history because of his support of the Acadian nationalist cause. This support was most evident in his work involving a mutual benefit society. In 1881 he helped organize the Convention Nationale des Acadiens and also on three subsequent occasions. This culminated in 1902 with the formation of the Société l'Assomption, a mutual benefit society. This became the most important Acadian financial institution of the 20th century and Benoît served as president, chancellor, and a director.

Benoît devoted much energy to Acadian causes and founding an institution that, in an altered form, still exists today.
