= Poulamon =

Community in Nova Scotia, Canada

Coordinates: 45°34′58.98″N 61°0′39.08″W

Poulamon in Nova Scotia

Poulamon is a community in the Canadian province of Nova Scotia, located on Isle Madame in Richmond County. On the Western side of Poulamon is Martinique and on the Eastern side is D'Escousse

Poulamon or "Poulamond" translated from French means tomcod, also commonly known as frostfish in reference to the Microgadus tomcod that was once swam abundant around Isle Madame.

Poulamon, like the rest of Isle Madame has many historic (status and non-status) building stock including the Former "Beaton's General Store" which once served as the location for a blacksmith shop, barber shop and fish processing facility among other businesses.

In the 1800s and early 1900s Poulamon had a strong agricultural base with cattle and sheep grazing occurring on Eagle Island and Crow Island brought there by boat from Poulamon.
