= Simon Joyce =

Canadian politician

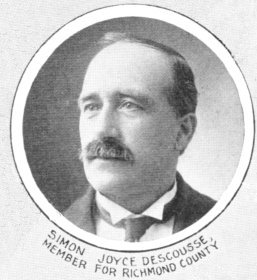
Simon Joyce

Simon Joyce (September 13, 1848 – October 1, 1922) was a farmer, sailor, ship owner and political figure in Nova Scotia, Canada. He represented Richmond County in the Nova Scotia House of Assembly from 1894 to 1906 and from 1911 to 1916 as a Liberal member.

He was born in D'Escousse, Nova Scotia, the son of Simon Joyce and Margaret Langlois. Joyce married Harriet Boudret. He taught school for a time. He was named a member of the Legislative Council of Nova Scotia in 1921 and served until his death in Halifax at the age of 74.
