= D'Escousse =

Community in Nova Scotia, Canada

Coordinates: 45°36′39.49″N 61°3′53.64″W

Grande Anse in Nova Scotia

D'Escousse (English: /dɛsˈkuːs/) is a community in the Canadian province of Nova Scotia, situated on the north-eastern side of Isle Madame. It is on Nova Scotia Route 320. It has had a church since 1845, which was destroyed as a result of a fire on July 20, 1954 and rebuilt in 1955, and closed for church services in 2014.

It was a settlement in the early 18th century. Ships would enter the D'Escousse harbour from the Grandique Ferry and Lennox Passage.

D'Escousse has an active social community, centred around its community hall with distinctive sloped roof, built in 1992 after the previous community hall was destroyed by fire in 1990. The community centre is managed by the D'Escousse Civic Improvement Society. Since it is the largest hall in the area, it is a hub for social activity for the whole of Isle Madame and surrounding area.

Well-known yachtsman and author Silver Donald Cameron was a resident.

The village, like others on Isle Madame, is intrinsically linked to Acadian history in North America.

== Notable residents ==
- Rémi Benoît, Acadian nationalist
- Silver Donald Cameron, Canadian journalist and author
- Simon Joyce, Canadian politician
