= L'Archeveque, Nova Scotia =

Community in Nova Scotia, Canada

Coordinates: 45°37′58″N 60°35′6″W

L'Archeveque in Nova Scotia

L'Archeveque is a small community in the Canadian province of Nova Scotia, located in Richmond County.
