= Port Royal, Richmond County, Nova Scotia =

Community in Nova Scotia, Canada

Coordinates: 45°32′14.56″N 61°5′17.18″W

Port Royal in Nova Scotia

Port Royal is a community in the Canadian province of Nova Scotia, located in Richmond County.

It is situated on the southwestern shore of Isle Madame and fronts Chedabucto Bay.
