= Alonzo Martell =

Canadian politician (1881–1942)

Alonzo Archibald Martell (October 20, 1881 – September 13, 1942) was a real estate agent, insurance broker, notary public and political figure in Nova Scotia, Canada. He represented Richmond-West Cape Breton in the Nova Scotia House of Assembly from 1928 to 1933 as a Liberal member.

He was born in Main-à-Dieu, Cape Breton Island, the son of Charles A. Martell and Margaret Firby Roberts. In 1919, he married Katherine Weir. Martell was mayor of Louisbourg from 1920 to 1926. He served as deputy clerk for the provincial legislature from 1934 to 1942. Martell also served as United States consul at Sydney, Nova Scotia. He died in Louisbourg at the age of 60.
