= Donald David Boyd =

Canadian politician

Donald David Boyd (June 29, 1883 – August 20, 1956) was a lawyer, civil servant and political figure in Nova Scotia, Canada. He represented Richmond County in the Nova Scotia House of Assembly from 1937 to 1941 as a Liberal member.

He was born in River Bourgeois, Nova Scotia, the son of Angus A. Boyd and Mary Fraser. Boyd was educated at St. Francis Xavier University and Dalhousie University. He married Katherine McIsaac. Boyd worked in the Department of Mines and Labour from 1941 to 1948 and the Department of the Attorney General from 1948 to 1956. He died at Prospect, Halifax County, Nova Scotia.
