= John Alexander Macdonald (Nova Scotia politician) =

Canadian politician

John Alexander Macdonald (January 3, 1883 – June 11, 1945) was a physician and political figure in Nova Scotia, Canada. He represented Richmond—West Cape Breton in the House of Commons of Canada from 1925 to 1930 as a Conservative member. He sat for Richmond—West Cape Breton division as a member of the Senate of Canada from 1932 to 1945.

He was born in Havre Boucher, Nova Scotia, the son of Hugh Macdonald, and was educated at Saint Francis Xavier University and Dalhousie University. In 1912, Macdonald married Margaret Lola Maxwell. He represented Richmond County in the Nova Scotia House of Assembly from 1916 to 1925, when he resigned to run for a federal seat. Macdonald resigned his seat in the Commons in 1930 to allow Edgar Nelson Rhodes to be elected there. He was a member of the Knights of Columbus. He died in office as a member of the Senate at the age of 62.
